= Timeline of the Mahsa Amini protests =

Chronology of the Iranian protests in 2022 sparked by the death of Mahsa Amini

This is a broad timeline of the ongoing series of protests against the government of Iran, sparked by the death of 22-year-old Mahsa Amini (Persian: مهسا امینی) on 16 September 2022. Amini had fallen into a coma after having been detained by the Guidance Patrol, allegedly for wearing an "improper" hijab—in violation of Iran's mandatory hijab law—while visiting Tehran from Saqqez.

Protests have largely subsided since Spring 2023, with sporadic protests and gatherings occurring since, notably the stripping of the Science and Research Girl in November 2024.

== 2022 ==
=== 16 September ===
According to MEMRI, protesters chanted "I will kill whoever killed my sister!" According to human rights groups cited by The Guardian, security forces used pepper spray and arrested several of the protestors gathered outside Kasra hospital, where Amini had been pronounced dead.

=== 17 September ===
Amini was buried in the morning of 17 September in her hometown, Saqqez. According to The Guardian, hundreds of people reportedly gathered at the funeral in defiance of official warnings. Some yelled anti-government slogans such as "death to the dictator" and "woman, life, freedom". According to the BBC, some women at the funeral removed their hijabs in protest. When protesters marched toward the local governor's office, security forces opened fire on protesters. Protests spread to the provincial capital, Sanandaj. Unverified social media posts showed crowds chanting "Saqez is not alone, it's supported by Sanandaj"; youths setting fire to tires; and protesters throwing rocks at riot police across clouds of tear gas. One man appeared to have a head injury, possibly caused by birdshot. Protesters in Saqqez tore down posters of Iran's supreme leader, Ayatollah Khamenei. The Guardian reported that Iran was curtailing Internet access following Amini's death, and also that Kurdish organizations were calling for a general strike.

The inscription on Amini's tombstone became a slogan of the protests:

Persian: ژینا جان تو نمی‌میری. نامت یک نماد می‌شود
romanized: Žīnā Ǧān to ne-mī-mīrī. Nām-at Yek Namād mī-šavad
"Beloved Žina [Mahsa], you will not die. Your name will become a code [rallying call]."

=== 18 September ===
The people of Sanandaj continued protesting, chanting the slogans "death to the dictator", "our shame, our shame / our bastard leader", and "death to Khamenei". Female protesters continued to take off their hijabs. According to unconfirmed sources quoted by the BBC, security forces fired on the demonstrators. A number of students from Tehran University held a protest rally with placards in their hands.

=== 19 September ===
The government cut off mobile internet service in central Tehran. According to videos on social media, protests continued in downtown Tehran, Rasht and Isfahan, as well as in Western Kurdish territory. According to Hengaw, a Nordic organization that monitors human rights in Iran, three protesters were killed by security forces in Kurdistan province.

A 23-year-old man named Farjad Darvishi was killed by police while protesting in Urmia. He was allegedly shot by police security agents during the demonstration, and died from his wounds on his way to the hospital.

=== 20 September ===
According to the Voice of America, unconfirmed social media videos showed anti-government protests in at least 16 of Iran's 31 provinces, including "Alborz, East Azerbaijan, Fars, Gilan, Golestan, Hormozgan, Ilam, Isfahan, Kerman, Kermanshah, Kurdistan, Mazandaran, Qazvin, Razavi Khorasan, Tehran, and West Azerbaijan." Iranian state media reported that three people had been killed in Kurdistan protests. According to Hengaw, two male protesters, one of them sixteen years old, were killed by security forces in West Azerbaijan, and a female protester was similarly killed in Kermanshah. The prosecutor in Kermanshah denied state responsibility, stating that people were being killed by "anti-revolutionary elements". Iranian state media reported a police assistant's death from protesters in Shiraz. In Kerman, a woman was filmed removing her hijab and cutting off her ponytail during a protest. Some witnesses interviewed by CNN characterized the day's protests as "flash protests" that sought to form and then to disperse quickly before security forces could intervene.

=== 21 September ===
According to an alleged leaked document later obtained by Amnesty International, the General Headquarters of the Armed Forces ordered commanders to "severely confront troublemakers and anti-revolutionaries".

According to Hengaw, a man allegedly shot by security forces two days earlier died from his injuries. Hengaw stated that a total of ten demonstrators had been killed by security forces; Amnesty International said it had confirmed eight of those deaths. Amnesty International also condemned what it called the "unlawful use of birdshot and other munitions" against the protesters. WhatsApp and Instagram, the only mainstream social media and messaging apps permitted in Iran, were restricted by the government; in addition, there was a widespread internet shutdown, especially on mobile networks. Iran's Basij, a state militia, held pro-government counter-rallies in Tehran. Demonstrations of solidarity with the protesters were held in other countries; including Canada, Italy, Sweden, Turkey, and the United States.

According to Iran International, there was a brief exchange of fire between the Iran Army Ground Forces and the Islamic Revolutionary Guard Corps (IRGC) in Saqqez. According to two semi-official Iranian news agencies, a member of the Basij was stabbed to death in Mashhad. According to a later Amnesty International report, 34 people were killed across Iran on 21 September.

Starting on 21 September, Iranian mobile operators regularly shut down their users' Internet access every day from 4 pm local time until about midnight. As of 30 September, this pattern was still continuing.

=== 22 September ===
Protesters in Tehran and other cities burned police stations and cars. The protests continued despite widespread internet outages throughout Iran. Iranian state media stated that at least 17 people had been killed to date, while the Oslo-based Iran Human Rights NGO counted at least 31 civilians dead.

The international Anonymous hacktivist collective claimed it had hacked at least 100 Iranian websites (including several belonging to the Iranian government) and compromised over 300 CCTV cameras by exploiting a vulnerability.

Intelligence agents raided the home of Iranian journalist Niloofar Hamedi for photographing and posting a photo of Amini's parents hugging each other at the hospital where their daughter was lying in a coma.

=== 23 September ===
Heavy fighting was reported in Isfahan at dusk. Universities were closed, and shifted to virtual teaching mode. It was reported that in Oshnavieh, after days of very heavy protesting and clashing, protestors took control of the city; however the Iranian government denied this.

The same day, people in several cities across Iran participated in state-organised pro-government rallies in support of the hijab and the government. The rally in Tehran was attended by thousands. According to a live state television broadcast, demonstrators chanted "Death to America" and "Death to Israel", reflecting Iran's clerical rulers' usual narrative of putting the blame of the unrest on foreign countries. The pro-government demonstrators also vocally expressed their desire for the anti-government protesters to be executed, and referred to the anti-government protesters as "Israel's soldiers". The government claimed that the rallies were spontaneous. Security forces in Iran always support state-organised gatherings, which are widely covered by Iran's state television and media; anti-government protests on the other hand, in which demonstrators chant against the establishment, are not sanctioned and are dispersed by security forces.

According to an alleged document later leaked to Amnesty International, the commander of Mazandran province gave orders to "confront mercilessly, going as far as causing deaths, any unrest by rioters and anti-Revolutionaries".

The United States Department of State issued a general license allowing US corporations access to the Iranian internet market. In response, American entrepreneur Elon Musk said that he would activate his satellite internet firm, Starlink, to provide internet services to Iran. Although the updated license did not cover hardware supplied by Starlink, the firm and other similar companies can apply for permission to the US Treasury.

=== 24 September ===
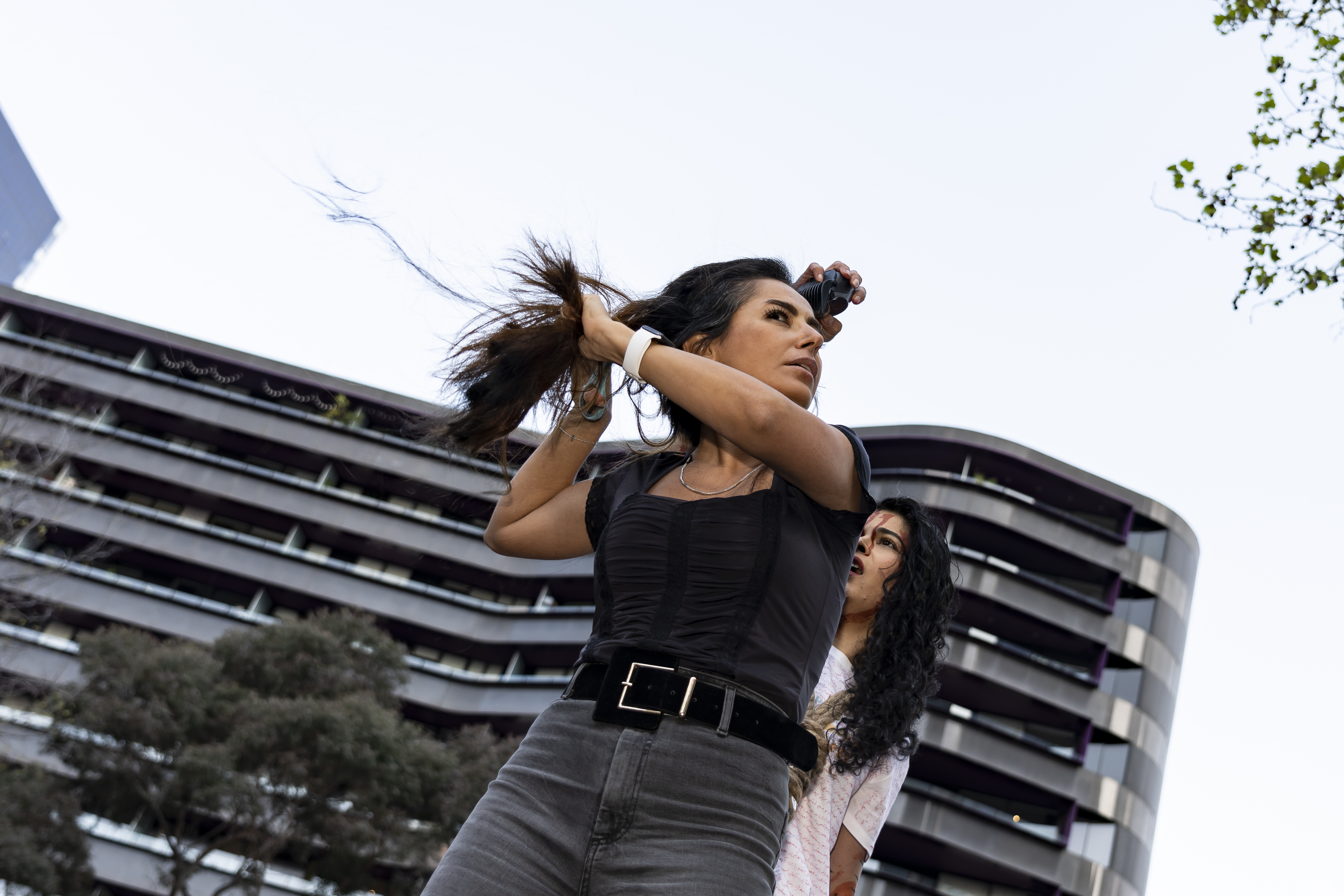
A woman in Melbourne, Australia, cutting off her hair in solidarity (24 September)

Heavy protests in the contested city of Oshnavieh continued. Protests also continued in front of Tehran University and in Shiraz. Iranians living abroad marched in support of the Iranian people in various cities, including Erbil, Berlin, Stuttgart, and Melbourne.

Inside Gilan province, police and Iran's Revolutionary Guard arrested 739 people, including at least 60 women. 88 guns were found and confiscated in Khuzestan province. The IRGC made multiple arrests in Kerman.

A 22-year-old woman, Hadis Najafi, who took part in the protest action in the city of Karaj, died from six bullet wounds in the chest, face and neck. Before her death, she appeared in a video showing her standing without a headscarf in front of a protest.

The New York Times reported that security forces were "opening fire on the crowds" in multiple cities, and stated "The videos posted online and the scale of the response from the authorities are difficult to independently verify, but video and photographs sent by witnesses known to The New York Times were broadly in line with the images being posted widely online." The Committee to Protect Journalists reported at least 11 journalists arrested, including Niloofar Hamedi, the reporter who originally broke Amini's story.

Mahsa Amini solidarity protests in Stuttgart, Germany
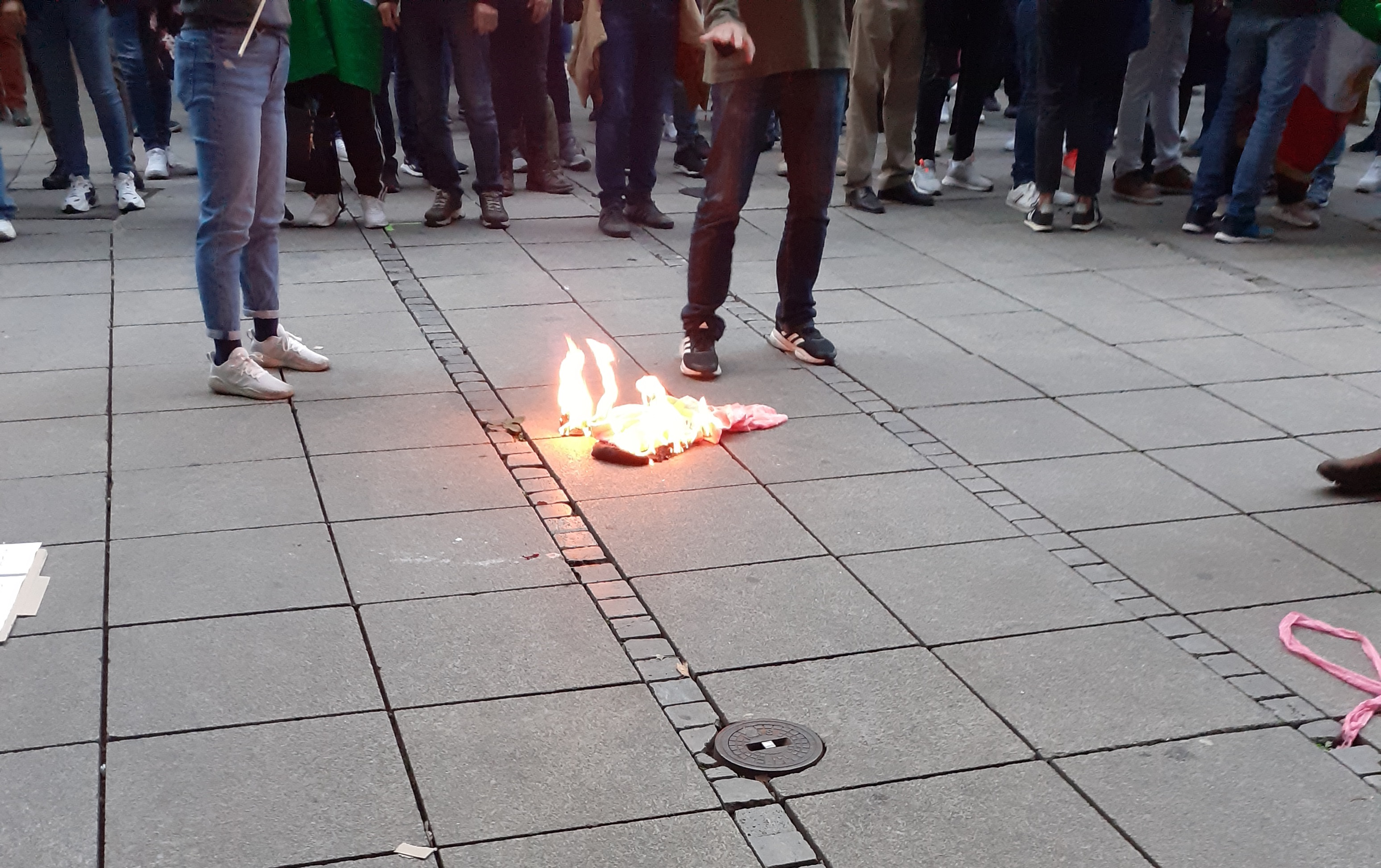

=== 25 September ===
Protests continued in various parts of Tehran (Narmak, Ekbatan, Valiasr, Aryashahr), Karaj (Mehrshahr and Gohardasht), Sanandaj, Qaen, Kashmar, and Babol despite the widespread outage of the internet network in Iran. Also, protests against the Iranian government continued in different cities of the world such as London, Brussels, and New York City. A Basij paramilitary member died of injuries he had sustained in Urmia on 22 September, one of several Basijis to have been killed in the demonstrations.

Despite the gathering of Iranian government supporters in Tehran's Revolution Square and the threat of violent confrontation against the protesters, people came to the streets at night in different areas of Tehran, Bushehr, Sanandaj, Qazvin, Yazd, Urmia, Shiraz, and Mashhad. The police attempted to halt the protests again. Iranians residing in Canada, France, United Kingdom, Norway, and Austria marched in support of the protests. A total of 1,200 people have reportedly been arrested.

Hacktivist collective Anonymous broke in to Iran's Supreme Audit Court database, releasing information and phone numbers about all members of the Iranian Parliament. In a video message announcing the hack, Anonymous said "The Iranian parliament supports the dictator when it should support the people, so we are releasing the personal information of all [lawmakers]".

=== 26 September ===
Solidarity protest in Qamishli, Syria (26 September)

The protests continued in cities such as Tehran, Tabriz, Yazd, Ghorveh, Sanandaj, Borazjan and Karaj. Students of Tabriz University protested the arrest of students by Iran's government police. Iranians abroad in countries like Canada, Spain and France rallied in support. The Organizing Council of Oil Contract Workers spoke in support of protestors. Iranian Chief Justice Gholamhossein Mohseni Ejei spoke in support of police officers.

=== 27 September ===
Clashes between riot police and security forces and demonstrators continued in a number of cities. Ravina Shamdasani, the spokesperson for the UN High Commission for Human Rights, urged Iran's clerical leadership to "fully respect the rights to freedom of opinion, expression, peaceful assembly, and association". Shamdasani added that reports specify that "hundreds have also been arrested, including human rights defenders, lawyers, civil society activists, and at least 18 journalists", and "Thousands have joined anti-government demonstrations throughout the country over the past 11 days. Security forces have responded at times with live ammunition". The Organizing Council of Oil Contract Workers warned the government that if the crackdown on protestors continues, they will strike, a move which could cripple Iran's oil sector which is a major part of the economy.

Iran Human Rights said that security forces were firing live ammunition directly at protesters. Iran reported the arrest of Faezeh Hashemi, the daughter of Akbar Hashemi Rafsanjani, who was the President of Iran from 1989 to 1997.

=== 28 September ===
Iranian riot police were deployed in Tehran's main squares to confront people chanting "death to the dictator". A solidarity protest at the Brandenburger Tor in Berlin was attended by around 1,800 people, including CSU politician Dorothee Bär, and Iranian-German actress Pegah Ferydoni.

=== 29 September ===
Protests continued in several cities throughout Iran. Police arrested Iranian songwriter Shervin Hajipour in Tehran, whose viral song "Baraye" had gained over 40 million Instagram views in a single day.

=== 30 September ===
In Zahedan, in "probably the single most violent incident of the protests", the Iranian police fired on civilians during Friday prayers. Up to forty people were killed and many wounded in Zahedan after protests that were sparked by reports about a police chief who had raped a 15-year-old girl in Chahbahar. Three days prior, the Friday Imam of Rask, Molavi Abdul Ghaffar Naghshbandi, had disclosed the identity of the police chief. Naghshbandi said that he had also spoken to the teenager in person as well as her family. He added "I know it is my duty, in both faith and conscience, to break this deadly silence so that this aggressor will be punished for his shameful actions."

People who gathered at the police station to demand punishment of the offender were targeted by security and military forces on the ground and by a helicopter in the air. The police station was torched during the rioting, which continued overnight. Several IRGC members were killed during the incident, including a senior IRGC commander who died after a shot to the chest by "anti-regime gunmen", according to Iranian state media. Iranian state media reported that 19 had died and 32 IRGC members were wounded, including volunteer Basijis. Iranian state media identified the personnel that had been killed as Hamidreza Hashemi, an IRGC colonel; Mohammad Amin Azarshokr, an IRGC member; Mohammad Amin Arefi, a Basiji; and Saeed Borhan Rigi, also a Basiji. According to Iranian state-controlled news agency IRNA, "armed separatists" were the culprit. The opposition Human Rights Activist News Agency estimated that at least 40 protesters were killed. On 4 October, the number of confirmed casualties in the Zahedan attack had risen to at least 63. A 6 October Amnesty International report found that government forces had "unlawfully fired live ammunition, metal pellets and teargas" directly into the vicinity of the Great Mosalla of Zahedan prayer site, a large prayer site across the road from the police station, "where hundreds of people, including children and older people, were still performing Friday prayers." Amnesty International acknowledged "a minority of protesters throwing stones towards the police station", but found no evidence that "would justify the use of lethal force". Amnesty International further stated that "many victims killed (were) facing away from the security forces and posed no imminent threat". The assault was widely dubbed "Bloody Friday".

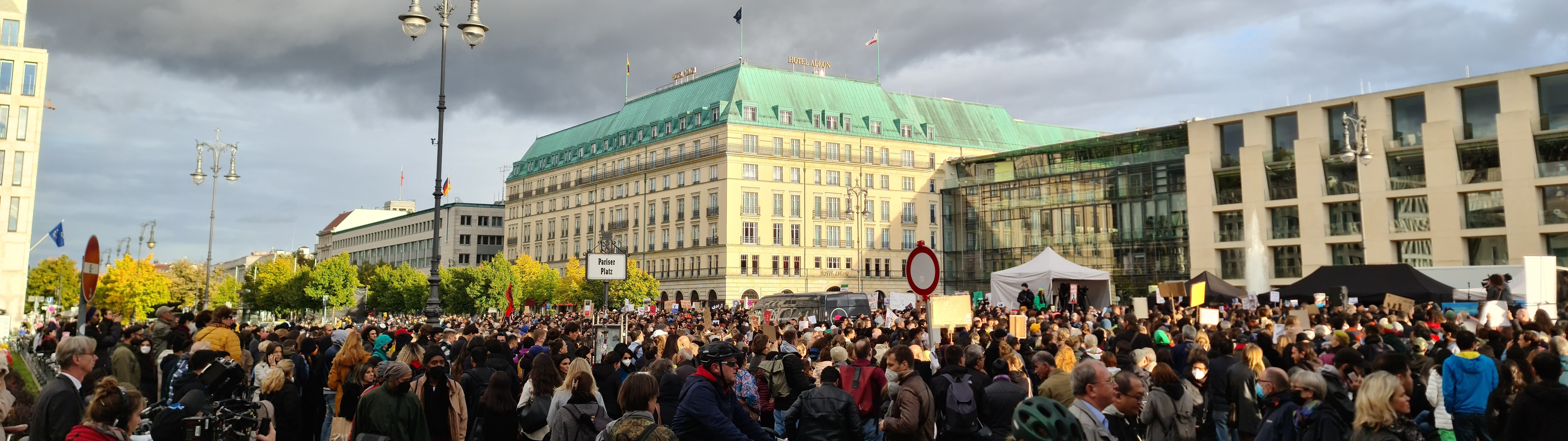
Protesters in Berlin in the rally, organized by Hamed Esmaeilion.

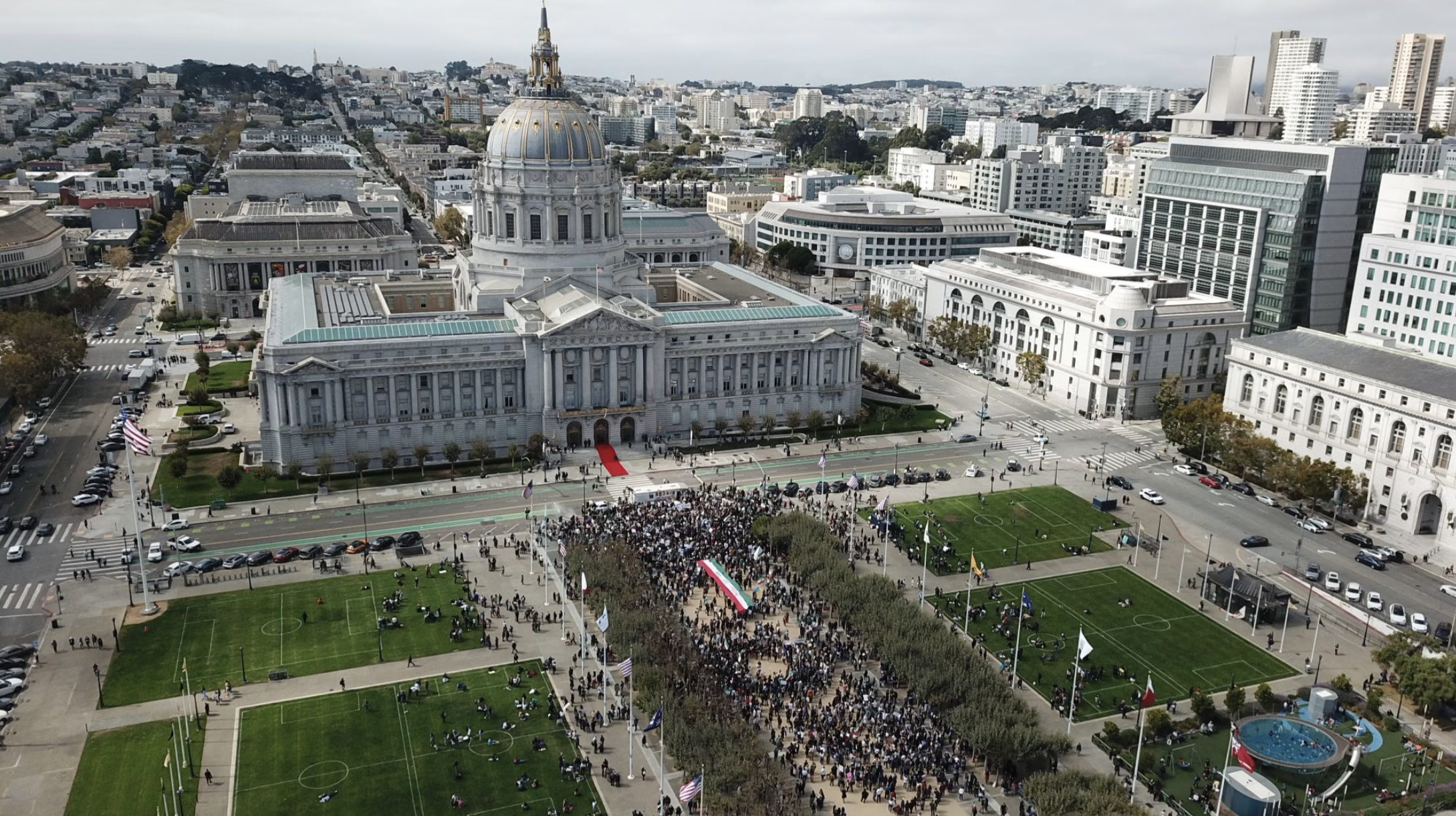
Protesters in a San Francisco rally on 1 October 2022

=== 1 October ===
Worldwide protests were held in solidarity with the uprising in Iran. Under the slogan "women, life, liberty" demonstrations took place in many major cities, including Auckland, London, Melbourne, New York, Los Angeles, Paris, Ottawa, San Francisco, St. John's, Montreal, Rome, Seoul, Stockholm, Sydney, Melbourne and Zurich. According to the York Regional Police, over 50,000 people attended the solidarity protest in Richmond Hill near Toronto. In Tehran, Iranian authorities fired bullets into the air to disperse protestors at Islamic Azad University.

Iran released Iranian-Americans Baquer Namazi and his son Siamak Namazi in a bid to unlock financial resources from American sanctions; however the United States refuted any connection between the hostages and sanctions.

=== 2 October ===
Protests continued with police reportedly shooting at students on the campus of Sharif University of Technology. Iranian Minister of Science, Research, and Technology Mohammad Ali Zolfigol successfully intervened and escorted some of the students out, but others were trapped and detained by law enforcement. The Islamic Association of Sharif University of Technology released a statement immediately vehemently condemning the attack, demanding a strike by both students and professors at the university until release of the protesters, compensation for damages, and an official apology.

Supporters of the Iranian protests also continued to demonstrate in cities worldwide.

=== 3 October ===
In his first statement since the outbreak of the widespread protests, Supreme Leader Ali Khamenei dismissed the widespread unrest as "riots" and suggested that a plot by Iran's foreign enemies was the cause. Khamenei called protest actions such as burning Qurans and mosques and removing hijabs "not normal, natural reaction[s]". Regarding tensions in the Kurdish and Baluch regions of Iran, he said: "I have lived among ethnic Baluchis and they are deeply loyal to the Islamic Republic", and "The ethnic Kurds are also among one of the most advanced groups in Iran who love their homeland, Islam and the establishment". The clerical leadership of Iran tries to cast the protests as having secessionist objectives and it being a foreign plot.

In what BBC News called an "unprecedented show of support", videos released on 4 October showed teenage schoolgirls in multiple cities joining the protests, removing their headscarves and chanting antigovernment slogans. Video shared on social media showed a group of schoolgirls in Karaj forcing an education official out of their school, chanting "shame on you" and throwing what appeared to be empty water bottles at him. Elsewhere in Karaj, and in Sanandaj, schoolgirls marched in the streets without their hijabs, chanting the popular Kurdish slogan, "Woman, Life, Freedom". In Shiraz, schoolgirls blocked traffic on a main road while chanting "death to the dictator", referring to Khamenei. Schoolgirls also protested in Saqqez. One image shared on social media showed a group of schoolgirls raising their middle finger at a portrait of Khamenei and Khomeini.

The schoolgirl protests followed the death of 16-year-old protester Nika Shakarami, who had disappeared at a protest 10 days earlier. According to a report by BBC Persian, Shakarami's family alleged that she had gone missing for 10 days following a protest in Tehran on 20 September. In her last message, Shakarami told a friend she was being pursued by security forces. On 30 September, Shakarami's family found her body in a detention center morgue in Tehran. The family was only briefly permitted to see Shakarami's face, but saw that her nose and skull had been broken. Shakarami's body was transferred to Khorramabad, her father's hometown, on 2 October, which would have been her 17th birthday. Under pressure from authorities, her family agreed not to hold a funeral. Shakarami's aunt, who posted about her niece on social media, was also arrested on Sunday after security forces raided her house and threatened to kill her if anyone in the family participated in the protests, according to BBC Persian. Shakarami's aunt said she had been told that her niece was in the Revolutionary Guard's custody and had briefly been imprisoned at Evin prison. On 3 October, the family told BBC Persian that authorities had stolen Shakarami's body and buried it in the village of Veysian, approximately 40 kilometres (25 mi) from Khorramabad.

=== 4 October ===
President Ebrahim Raisi gave a speech calling for unity while repeating Khamenei's earlier claim of foreign interference. Opposition singer Shervin Hajipour was released on bail.

=== 5 October ===
Iranian security forces deployed at universities in several cities, including Urmia, Tabriz, Rasht and Tehran.

French actresses including Juliette Binoche, Marion Cotillard, Isabelle Adjani and Isabelle Huppert cut locks of their hair in protest over Amini's death in a video shared on social media with the hashtag #HairForFreedom.

=== 8 October ===
Nationwide protests commenced before noon. At al-Zahra University, President Raisi posed for a group photo at one location on campus, while women protestors elsewhere on the campus shouted "Death to the oppressor". Protests took place in Saqqez and Sanandaj. A video of a woman shot dead in Mashhad circulated; the killing was compared to the 2009 killing of Neda Agha-Soltan. Protests also took place in Tehran, Isfahan, Karaj, Shiraz and Tabriz. Strikes were held in Saqqez, Sanandaj, Divandarreh and Mahabad. With the protests having entered a fourth week, the governments semi-official news agencies tried to play down the protests in Tehran, by saying there were only "limited" demonstrations, and said that the Bazaaris had closed their shops out of fear of damage, denying that there was a strike. A man was killed behind his steering wheel in Sanandaj; state news agency IRNA blamed it on "counter-revolutionaries" and denied security forces had used live rounds. A state-run live-television broadcast was hacked by a group of protesters calling themselves Persian: عدالت علی, romanized: ʿEdālat-e ʿAlī, lit. 'Ali's Justice' at around 18:00 local time. The disruption showed an image of Khamenei being targeted by a set of superimposed crosshairs while being surrounded by flames, captioned with various agitative slogans directed at the television audience and the verse "The Blood of Our Youths Is on Your Hands" accompanied by audio recordings of the chant "Woman, Life, Freedom". The Guardian characterized Tehran protests on 8 October as "large, but not huge".

=== 9 October ===
Recordings of the hacktivist intervention in 8 October state TV news broadcast were spread widely online on 9 October. Schoolchildren were arrested inside school by security forces and put inside vans without license plates according to social media reports from inside the country. All schools and higher education institutions were also closed in Iran's Kurdish regions, signifying the government's concern about the ongoing dissent according to The Guardian. Protests continued in dozens of cities across the country. Hundreds of high-school girls and university students participated, and were met with tear gas and many cases of live ammunition by security forces according to rights groups. The Iranian government denied using live rounds.

=== 10 October ===
Protests continued throughout the country against the government, across dozens of cities. According to The Guardian, government officials are struggling to put a halt to them. Over 1,000 workers at Iran's petrochemical plants at Bushehr and Damavand threatened the government to go on strike, and chanted "death to the dictator", which The Guardian described as "an ominous development for the regime". A Twitter video was published which depicted dozens of oil workers blocking the road to the Bushehr petrochemical plant, whilst chanting "Death to the Dictator". Iran's oil ministry has not yet commented.

As Iran is heavily dependent on its oil exports, the government will try to make sure that the oil production keeps on going, and to prevent such protests amongst oil workers from spreading throughout the rest of the oil industry. For the third time since the unrest started, members of Iran's medical community issued a statement demanding security forces to show greater restraint. They asserted that protesters have been taken out of ambulances and beaten up by security forces with batons. The governor of Kurdistan province, Esmail Zarei Kousha, alleged without providing evidence, that unknown groups "plotted to kill young people on the streets" (reported by semi-official Fars news agency). According to Iran's official press, twenty-four security officials have been killed since the start of the protests by what they claim were "rioters". According to human rights group Hengaw, security forces are located in large quantities in Sanandaj, Saqqez, and Divandarreh. Hengaw also said that at least five Kurdish residents were killed and over 150 injured since Saturday 8 October.

=== 11 October ===
Clashes between protesters and government security forces continued, with the latter waging "a deadly crackdown" according to Reuters. Social media showed tanks being moved to Iran's Kurdish areas, although Reuters said it could not verify the video footage. Energy installations were hit by strikes for the second day. Videos posted by the widely followed Tasvir1500 Twitter account showed workers protesting at the Abadan oil refinery, Kangan and the Bushehr petrochemical plant. Videos posted by Tasvir1500 showed a few dozen oil workers chanting "Death to the dictator". Iran's regional government official tried to deny the ongoing unrest at the energy sector, and said that the workers at the Assaluye plant "were angered by a dispute over wages and were not protesting over Amini's death". Likewise, Iran's state news agency IRNA reported that the Abadan refinery was working normally and denied that strikes had been staged at the facility. Dozens of universities continued their strikes. According to a video posted by Tasvir1500, in Fuladshahr in Isfahan province, protesters set ablaze to the office of a prayer leader.

Reuters explains that it was a combination of mass protests and strikes by oil workers and bazaaris that helped the Shia clergy of Iran into power in 1979.

=== 12 October ===
Human rights groups cited by CBS News charged that hundreds of children were being detained, mostly in prisons, without access to lawyers and without properly notifying their parents. Yousof Nouri, Iran's Education Minister, stated that the arrested schoolchildren were being held in "psychological centers", and would be discharged once they had been "reformed".

Chief of Police Hossein Ashtari admitted that protesters were being shot at, but did not attribute them to government forces but rather to "counterrevolutionary groups" wearing police uniforms.

Protesters called for a mass rally in Tehran following violence the night earlier in the capital as well as in Sanandaj, Saqez, Bukan and Dehgolan. Many of Tehran's shops remained closed in protest, while a demonstration led by Tehran's bar association was broken up by security forces.

At a news conference in Washington, U.S. State Department spokesperson Ned Price said that reviving the JCPOA is "not our focus right now," and that the United States was concentrating on how to support Iranian protesters in their peaceful demonstrations.

Senior conservative politician Ali Larijani, in response to excessive state enforcement of hijab laws, called for a "re-examination" of the enforcement of mandatory hijab, and acknowledged that the protests have deep political roots, and are not simply the result of a US or Israeli plot. According to The Guardian, Larijani's statement signifies the "first cracks" amongst Iran's political elite regarding the unrest, with his tone contrasting with that of Khamenei, Iranian parliament and security forces, and the persistent efforts to sabotage the credibility of Amini's family. Larijani told Ettela'at: "if 50% of our country's women do not practice wearing a full hijab, then the police should not be involved ... The question here is this: Should the government interfere in all matters such as this one?"

Security forces continued the crackdown in Iran's Kurdish regions, with 7 protesters killed overnight. According to human rights group Hengaw, protesters clashed with "security forces' intense violence" on Wednesday night, with direct fire from security forces being responsible for the death of two people in Kermanshah. Hengaw added that three members of the security forces were killed in Kermanshah, with some 40 more injured. Reuters added that it was unable to independently verify the report. The Iranian government denied firing on protesters.

=== 13 October ===
In Ardabil, students at the Shahed Girls High School were compelled to join a pro-government demonstration where they were to perform the song "Salam Farmandeh". When a group of schoolgirls refused to participate, security forces were summoned to the school. The students were beaten and 10 of the girls were arrested. Another 12 girls had to be taken to Fatemi Hospital and one, Asra Panahi, died from her injuries.

=== 14 October ===
EU diplomat Josep Borrell called for Iran to stop repressing protesters, and wrote in a Twitter post that "people in Iran have the right to peaceful protest." Khamenei on state TV compared the Iranian Republic to a "mighty tree" and said that "no one should dare think they can uproot it", in what Parisa Hafezi of Reuters called his "toughest warning" to protesters to date. Protests took place in Ahvaz and Zahedan. CNN reported that according to Amnesty International, at least 23 children had been killed since the beginning of the protests.

A video appeared in which anti-riot forces sexually assaulted a female protester, causing further outrage on social media. The video was verified by BBC's Persian service. Tehran's police, according to state news agency IRNA, said that the incident was being investigated. Tehran police refrained from publishing details of the incident and only stated that "enemies using psychological warfare tried to cause public anxiety and incite violence". Given that the incident happened in broad daylight, human rights groups questioned what security forces might have been doing behind closed doors. BBC Persian stated that "mistreatment, including sexual and psychological abuse, has been reported by many inmates, especially political prisoners, for years", and that many Iranian social media users reacted by saying that the incident had made them even more determined to protest on the streets.

Patrick Wintour, in The Guardian, suggested the Iranian political elite was divided in how to frame the ongoing unrest: either as a covert foreign intelligence plot, or as "a dangerous warning that the values of the Islamic Revolution have lost sway over a new generation infected by a western controlled internet".

The Iranian government hung up a giant billboard in Tehran showing about 50 prominent Iranian women with hijabs, under the slogan "women of my land". However, within 24 hours, it was forced to take the billboard down due to complaints by the women in the poster or their relatives as they objected to being depicted as government supporters and proponents of the compulsory hijab. The billboard was owned by the IRGC. The Guardian labelled it as a "[public relations] fiasco".

=== 15 October ===
Footage of Evin prison, where many of the protestors, journalists, and other political prisoners are detained, has been shared online showing the facility on fire. The Islamic Republic's state media agency IRNA reported that inmates had set storage rooms ablaze, but no independent witness report could be obtained to confirm this statement. Gunshots, sirens and protesters' chanting against the government could be heard in the background, with families of the prisoners having gathered in front of the main gate. Riot police and firefighters were also seen entering the prison. At least one prisoner, who was currently under temporary release on license, was warned not to return to the prison on the day before the riot broke out.

Protestors called for demonstrations to be held in Ardabil in protest against the 12 October 2022 death of Asra Panahi, which resulted from her being attacked by plainclothes security forces at Shahed Girls High School. Other pupils had also been attacked by the security forces.

=== 16 October ===
According to the Jerusalem Post, forces belonging to Hezbollah (from Lebanon) and Hashd al-Shaabi (from Iraq) were assisting in the crackdown. The Reuters chief Iran correspondent Parisa Hafezi assessed that ongoing unrest "does not seem close to toppling the system".

=== 17 October ===
On 17 October, the EU sanctioned eleven individuals and four entities in Iran, including the Basij and the morality police. Protests by high school and university students and other people took place in at least 10 cities in 9 provinces. Protestors were beaten by security forces in the Ardabil protests.

=== 18 October ===
High school and university students and others held protests in at least 9 cities in 8 provinces. Retired IRGC general Hossein Alaei "expressed sympathy for some protester grievances and suggested abolishing the morality patrol".

=== 20 October ===
The Coordinating Council of Teachers Syndicates, a teachers' union, announced two days of public mourning over the "unjustly shed blood of justice seekers and the heinous killing of Iranian students." They called for a nationwide teachers' strike and a two-day "sit-in" on 23 and 24 October.

Researcher Mark Pyruz was quoted by AFP as stating that protests appeared to have peaked on 21 September, and afterwards continued at a sustained level, in contrast to the 2019 protests. Henry Rome of The Washington Institute described the situation as an unstable equilibrium, where in the face of demonstrations, Iran actively attempted to prevent the opposition from organizing. Rome predicted that "current protests and violence could persist for an extended period".

=== 22 October ===
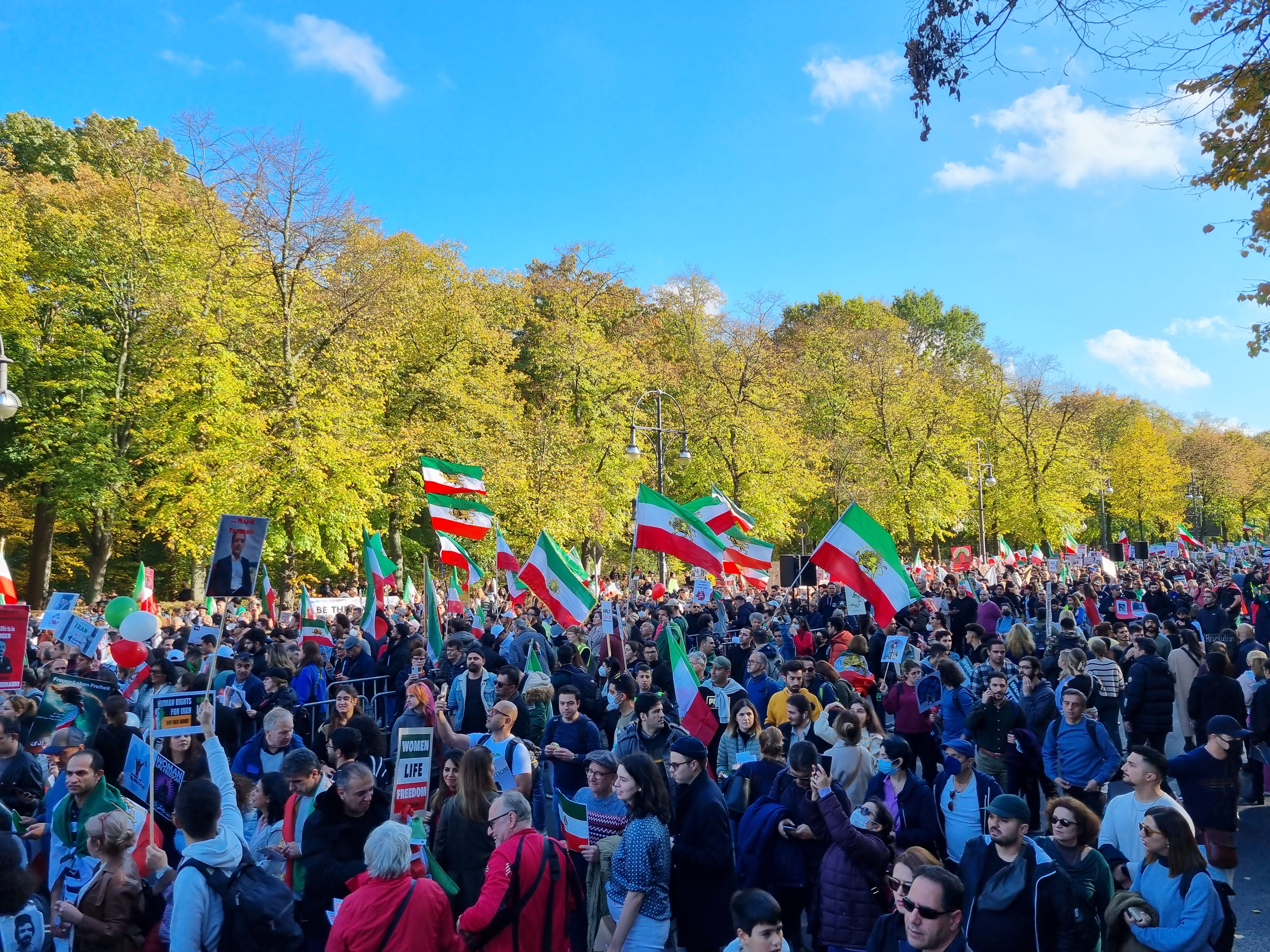
A view of the Iran solidarity protest in Berlin on 22 October 2022 organized by Hamed Esmaeilion.

Anti-government protests took place in 24 cities in 18 provinces around Iran. Anti-government strikes by merchants and other workers were held in ten cities in seven provinces.

Internationally, between 80,000 and 100,000 people marched in Berlin in solidarity with the Iranian women's rights movement. Thousands also marched in Los Angeles, Washington D.C., London, Paris, Tokyo, Sydney, Istanbul, and in cities across Europe.

Several intra-elite public statements were made. Mohsen Hashemi Rafsanjani suggested modifying the Constitution of Iran in response to the protests. Abbas Ahmad Akhoundi called for clerics to support the protestors. Clerics Mostafa Mohaghegh Damad and Asadollah Bayat-Zanjani criticised security services for Amini's death.

The grey hat security hacker group Black Reward published 50 gigabytes of files related to the nuclear program of Iran, including a video filmed inside Bushehr Nuclear Power Plant, and planning, financial and other documents of the program.

=== 23 October ===
University protests continued to spread in Iranian universities. At Sharif University of Technology, female students tried to enter the dining hall together with male students, contrary to segregation rules. Basij members tried to use tables to prevent the mixed entry to the dining hall. The male and female students overcame the blockade, entered the hall, and chanted in celebration.

=== 24 October ===
Students at K. N. Toosi University of Technology refused to pay any attention to a speech by Ali Bahadori Jahromi, a spokesperson for president Raisi, chanting and shouting at him instead of listening to his message.

=== 26 October ===
Protests expanded on 26 October, with protests held in 33 cities, including Tehran, Isfahan and Mashhad, in 23 provinces. As many as ten thousand mourners headed to Amini's gravesite in Saqqez on foot, by car and automobile to commemorate 40 days since her death, which traditionally marks the end of mourning in Iran. Protesters headed towards Saqqez despite warnings by the security forces not to hold the ceremony. According to Hengaw and eyewitnesses, security forces shot with teargas and opened fire on people. According to Hengaw, more than fifty civilians were injured by direct fire in cities in the region. The Iranian government said that the security forces were forced to respond to "riots". It also tried to block internet use in the region. Images shared by Hengaw showed that the government had dispatched heavy presence of security forces overnight in order to block entrance to Saqqez and to close roads leading to Amini's gravesite.

One group of students at Amirkabir University in Tehran chanted "We are the free women, you are the whores" at the police. Substantial groups gathered at Isfahan, Ahvaz, Azad and Shahid Beheshti universities and a massive poster depicting Ali Khamenei was burned down at Mashhad.

An IRGC member was shot dead in Malayer. According to Islamic Republic News Agency, the government's official news agency, he was killed "by rioters", which according to the Institute for the Study of War marked the 33rd member of the security forces to be killed during the protests.

That day, Islamic State – Khorasan Province declared support for the protesters. According to the Institute for the Study of War, these statements were "likely [intended] to further stoke sectarian divides" in the country. According to the same institute, it is likely that the government will exploit the Shah Cheragh massacre to deflate the protests, and use it to redirect "public attention away from the protests and channel anger toward foreign adversaries such as the Islamic State and Saudi Arabia".

In Germany, TV hosts Joko Winterscheidt and Klaas Heufer-Umlauf gave their Instagram accounts, which had about 2 million followers between them, to Azam Jangravi and Sarah Ramani, two Iranian women's rights activists, in order to raise awareness of the protests. By the next day, both accounts had gained hundreds of thousands of new followers.

=== 29 October ===
Speaking at the funeral of victims of the 26 October Islamic State attack, IRGC head Hossein Salami stated, "Today is the last day of the riots. Do not come to the streets again."

There were protests in 22 cities in 14 provinces. Protestors blamed the government for the 26 October Shah Cheragh massacre, and compared it to the 1978 Cinema Rex fire.

=== 30 October ===
A Tehran court held the first hearings for the people it accuses of being "rioters"; several individuals were charged with "corruption on Earth" and "waging war against God", which carries the death penalty in accordance with post-1979 Iranian law. According to the Iranian judiciary, more than 1,000 indictments have been issued for people it accuses of participating in "riots". Thousands demonstrated in defiance of IRGC head Salami's threat a day earlier. Rallies continued on the streets.

University students also continued to protest, particularly at the central and northern Tehran campuses of Islamic Azad University. Governmental security forces responded with teargas and pellet guns. Some students were sent text messages with statements saying that they were banned indefinitely from campus. At some universities, students demolished walls that existed to separate men and women in public areas.

=== 31 October ===
Protests continued throughout various cities, including Tehran and Sanandaj. The opposition group 1500tasvir reported Iranian use of sound grenades against residents protesting from their apartments in Ekbatan, Tehran.

Tehran's chief prosecutor announced that about 1,000 people have been charged in connection with the anti government protests.

=== 1 November ===
IRGC head Salami had issued multiple warnings to Saudi Arabia in October 2022, including a warning that "You are involved in this matter and know that you are vulnerable, it is better to be careful". Iran-backed proxies had attacked Saudi Arabia in previous years. On 1 November 2022, the Wall Street Journal reported that Saudi Arabian officials claimed intelligence of a possible imminent attack by Iran.

=== 2 November ===
Iran's Supreme Leader Ali Khamenei said the government had "no dispute" with young people on the streets, but asserted that U.S. and other foreign powers were orchestrating the unrest.

Reacting to a recently posted video of a prone protestor being beaten, run over by a motorcycle, beaten again, and then shot at close range by police, the Iranian police stated they were launching an investigation and said "the offending police officers will certainly be dealt with according to the law".

=== 3 November ===
Mourning ceremonies for Iranians who died in the protests turned into large demonstrations in cities including Karaj and Shabad. In Karaj, near Tehran, protesters filmed burning and ripping up an abah, a long robe traditionally worn by Shi'ite clerics. A Basiji militiaman was killed and five police officers wounded during a "riot" in Karaj, according to Iran's semi-official news agency Tasnim News.

In a wide-ranging campaign speech in California, U.S. President Joe Biden vowed to "free Iran" and stated that demonstrators would soon succeed in freeing themselves. During the speech dozens of demonstrators gathered outside and held banners in support of the protesters in Iran.

A cleric at a Shi'ite mosque in Zahedan was shot dead according to Islamic Republic News Agency, the government's official news agency. Germany's foreign ministry urged its citizens to leave Iran or risk arbitrary arrest and prison terms. It stipulated that dual nationals are particularly at risk.

Human Rights Watch reported that Iranian authorities have stepped up assault against the widespread unrest and dissent "by filing dubious national security charges against detained activists and staging grossly unfair trials." They add: "Iran's vicious security apparatus is using every tactic in its book, including lethal force against protesters, arresting and slandering human rights defenders and journalists, and sham trials to crush widespread dissent. Yet every new atrocity only reinforces why Iranians are demanding fundamental changes to a corrupt autocracy."

According to rights group Hengaw, a 27-year old rapper named Saman Yasin from Kermanshah was accused by Iran's judiciary of being an "enemy of God", which, under post-1979 Iranian law is a capital offence. According to Hengaw, Yasin had sung protest songs in Kurdish and was tortured during the first few weeks of his detention. Iran's government continues to deny allegations by human rights group about the abuse of prisoners.

Videos on social media showed the electricity in the Chaharbagh neighborhood of Isfahan being cut off by the government in response to the protests. People continued to chant slogans against the Islamic government in the dark.

=== 4 November ===
Iran's president Ebrahim Raisi responded in a live televised speech to Biden's statement of 3 November, saying that "Iran was freed 43 years ago". He also said that the protesters are "deceived traitors". Despite the protests, state-sponsored annual demonstrations were held for the "National Day of Fighting Global Arrogance", in commemoration of the 1979 seizure of the US embassy. Broadcasts on government television stations showed large numbers of attendees.

1500Tasvir showed protests in Zahedan, Khash and Saravan in Sistan and Baluchestan province. The videos showed protesters carrying their injured fellow protesters. Other videos showed police shooting from the rooftops; Reuters said it was unable to verify the videos.

According to the semi-official Tasnim News, an unspecified number of people were injured during clashes whilst putting the blame on protesters. According to Tasnim, in Khash, people attacked a government building and destroyed vehicles which resulted in security forces opening fire. According to Amnesty International, up to ten people may have been killed. It stated: "The crackdown is feared to have left up to 10 people including children dead and dozens more injured," Amnesty said on Twitter. "@amnesty is gravely concerned about further bloodshed amid internet disruptions and reports of authorities bringing more security forces to Khash from Zahedan."

Abdolhamid Ismaeelzahi, a high-ranking Sunni cleric, known to have criticized Iran's Shi'ite clerical rulership in the past, called on the leadership to hold a referendum in order to deal with Iran's crisis. He stated: "You should resolve your problem with this nation which once gave you your legitimacy. The majority of people are dissatisfied now. If you disagree, then hold a just referendum with international observers."

=== 6 November ===
Protests continued in Tehran, at universities and in Iran's Kurdish region, as well as Yazd, and Rasht, despite crackdowns. According to Hengaw, security forces started to shoot at protesters in Marivan, wounding 35 people. The Guardian notes that it was not immediately able to verify the toll.

The protests in Marivan were ignited by Nasrin Ghadri's death, a student in Tehran of Kurdish origins from Marivan. Hengaw reported that she died on Saturday 5 November as a result of police brutality. Iran's government has not released a statement over Ghadri's death. Hengaw added that Ghadri was buried without the permission of a funeral ceremony, reportedly fearing it could become yet another powder keg leading to further protests. The government dispatched further security personnel to the region of Marivan according to Hengaw.

Students at Sharif University in Tehran held a sit-in in solidarity of their arrested associates.

Iranian lawmakers considered to be part of the hardline spectrum within Iran's government urged Iran's judiciary to "deal decisively" with those creating and assisting the "riots". According to state media, 227 out of 290 lawmakers supported the statement.

Iran's hardliners have put the blame on Ali Shamkhani (the secretary of Iran's Supreme National Security Council) for being unable to suppress the protests. According to Hamid Rasaei, a cleric and former lawmaker, Iran's security organs all point to Shamkhani as the main culprit for the leadership's failure in quelling the protests. Rasaei also blamed President Raisi for not having postponed the replacement of Shamkhani.

=== 8 November ===
On 8 November 2022, Human Rights Activists in Iran announced a tally of 321 protester deaths while the Islamic Republic's courts promised harsh sentences to convicted demonstrators. The AFP reported the Asvaran, Iran's mounted police which are rarely deployed during protests, were patrolling in the streets of Tehran. Iran's team abstained from singing along with the Iranian national anthem at an Asian Water Polo Championship match in Bangkok.

=== 9 November ===
Ahmad Taheri, the chief of police of Sistan and Baluchestan province, was dismissed and replaced by Mohammad Ghanbari on the order of Hossein Ashtari (Iran's chief of police). Taheri had been the commander of the province's police forces during the 2022 Zahedan massacre.

The pro-government Khabar Online quoted the head of the Iranian army's ground forces, Kiumars Heydari, as saying "If these flies (protesters) are not dealt with today as the revolutionary society expects, it is the will of the supreme leader of the revolution. But the day he issues an order to deal with them, they will definitely have no place in the country."

=== 11 November ===
On 11 November, protesters in southeastern Iran marked the 2022 Zahedan massacre with "Death to Khamenei" chants.

The Iranian national basketball team refrained from singing the national anthem during a match against China in Tehran. The act was widely interpreted as a show of support for the protests.

According to a video on 1500tasvir, depicting the overnight protests at Babolsar, petrol bombs were thrown at a Basij base.

A cleric from Urmia stated during prayers that Iranian athletes who refrain from singing the national anthem should be punished.

=== 12 November ===
According to state news agency IRNA, the judiciary indicted eleven people over the killing of a Basij member on 3 November in Karaj; some of the indicted were charged with Mofsed-e-filarz ("corruption on earth"), which, as per post-1979 Iranian law, could result in a death penalty.

Iran Human Rights showed videos depicting student sit-ins at the campuses of universities in Tehran and Karaj.

During an awards ceremony in Tehran, Iranian archer Parmida Ghasemi, whose headscarf had been removed, said she had not noticed it falling off. It was widely interpreted as being a show of support for the protests.

French president Emmanuel Macron met with Iranian women activists in Paris. Iran's government responded by calling the meeting "shameful" and claiming it constituted a breach of the French government's responsibilities in curbing terrorism.

=== 13 November ===
Iran's courts passed down the first known death sentence related to the protests, against a defendant accused of setting fire to a government building.

=== 15 November ===
15 November was the first of three days of protests and strikes which were called online to mark the third anniversary of the Bloody Aban protests in 2019. It saw the largest number of protests since the beginning of the protest wave. Over 50 protests in over 30 cities were reported. Strikes were held in several cities to commemorate the 2019 protests, which resulted in one of the bloodiest crackdowns in the history of the Islamic Republic according to Reuters. The Esfahan Steel Company (one of Iran's largest steel producers) joined the strike, as did the shops located in the Tehran Grand Bazaar, the Azad University of Karaj, as well as the Kurdish-populated cities in the western part of the country, amongst others.

Four protesters were reportedly sentenced to death in Iran.

=== 16 November ===
The deadliest incidents of the three days marking the anniversary of the 2019 protests occurred on 16 November in the city of Izeh during the attack on Izeh market where at least seven people died, including two boys aged 9 and 13. Iranian authorities said two teams of "terrorists" armed with assault rifles opened fire on a crowd killing and injuring civilians and security force members. Anti-government Iranians have blamed the authorities.

=== 17 November ===
Protestors in the city of Khomeyn set fire to the home-turned-museum of the founder of the Islamic Republic of Iran Ayatollah Ruhollah Khomeini, as confirmed by social media verified by the AFP. The extent of damage to the museum was unclear. Tasnim News Agency, a semi-official news agency of the Iranian government with links to the IRGC, denied the fire occurred and stated the museum remained open to the public.

=== 18 November ===
On 18 November, Iranian security forces, including the IRGC, the police, and the Ministry of Intelligence took military action in Mahabad, Bukan, Piranshahr, Divandarreh, and Sanandaj, sending in helicopters and armoured military vehicles. They fired with live ammunition, used machine guns, and raided private homes. Major protests took place in Mahabad on the same day. Protestors set up barricades. Photos and audio recordings of heavy gunfire and screams circulated on online social media on the evening of 19 November. Iran Human Rights and Hengaw stated there was a lot of gunfire in Mahabad and loud explosions in Mahabad and the other cities on the evening from 18 to 19 November. Electricity was cut from areas of Mahabad where barricades had been erected. The Democratic Party of Iranian Kurdistan (PDKI) claimed that martial law was imposed on Mahabad on the evening of 19 November. Hengaw said on 18 November that three civilians had been shot by security forces in Divandarreh. Hengaw stated its concern that the military forces could carry out a massacre.

=== 19 November ===
Iran's state television aired several state-sponsored funerals which were attended by thousands in commemoration of three members of Iran's Basij security forces who were recently killed.

=== 20 November ===
A protester who allegedly blocked traffic and clashed with the Basij became the sixth demonstrator to be sentenced to death since the start of the protests.

=== 22 November ===
The Islamic Republic stated 40 foreign nationals had been arrested. The government described them as "terrorists."

The Office of the High Commissioner for Human Rights of the United Nations stated that more than 300 people including 40 minors have been killed so far by the Iranian government since the start of the protests, throughout the country and in 25 out of 31 of its provinces. They also expressed worries over the major crackdown in the Kurdish-populated western part of the country during the past week in which so far more than 40 people were killed by the government's security forces. Iran Human Rights published a figure of more than 72 killed in the past week, including 56 in Kurdish areas.

In the Kurdish city Javanrud, Bahman Reyhani's Kermanshah Nebi Akram Corps caused an outrage after their soldiers recorded themselves throwing tear gas and firing guns in an attempt to disperse protesters while shouting "Allahu Akbar." Kurdish community angered due to the fact that the Nebi Akram Corps soldiers were also ethnic Kurds themselves.

=== 25 November ===
Farideh Moradkhani, a niece of supreme leader Ali Khameni and a prominent dissident, was arrested after recording a video condemning the Iranian government.

=== 26 November ===
In the first official Iranian government casualty declaration since September, Iranian General Amir Ali Hajizadeh was quoted as stating over 300 Iranians, including security forces, had been killed since the start of the protests. Hajizadeh continued to echo the Iranian state narrative that many of those dead were uninvolved civilians killed by anti-government groups. The figure of 300 is smaller than independent estimates.

Supreme leader Ali Khamenei stated that the Basij forces had sacrificed their lives in what he and the government continued to refer as "riots". In a televised speech he said: "They have sacrificed their lives to protect people from rioters ... the presence of Basij shows that the Islamic Revolution is alive". Videos on social media showed protests continued at several universities in Tehran and Isfahan. Reuters was unable to verify the footage.

=== 28 November ===
Iran's foreign ministry spokesman Nasser Kanaani stated that the Iranian government rejects cooperation with the probe voted for at the U.N. Rights Council, that aimed to investigate the Iranian government's deadly crackdown and human rights abuses during the nationwide unrest. Kanaani added: "We have specific information proving that the U.S., Western countries and some of the American allies have had a role in the protests". However Kanaani did not provide any details. Iran's government continued to refer to the unrest as "riots" fomented by adversaries of the Iranian government.

=== 29 November ===
Iran Human Rights reported that, of the 448 people they had verified killed by security forces, over half had been killed in Kurdish or Baloch areas, including 128 killed in the Baloch-majority Sistan-Baluchistan province.

=== 30 November ===
18 students from the Nour Technical School in Qom were taken to hospital, the first of the alleged Iranian schoolgirl mass poisonings.

=== 3 December ===
Prosecutor General Mohammad Jafar Montazeri was reported as having announced the dissolution of the Guidance Patrol, whose treatment of Mahsa Amini started the ongoing protests. Some have suggested his remarks were misinterpreted. At the same time, it was announced the mandatory hijab legislation would be reviewed. The moves were seen as attempts to quell the ongoing unrest.

=== 4 December ===
On 4 December, IRNA confirmed and the Associated Press reported the executions of 4 men, who had been convicted by the Islamic Republic courts of having cooperated with the Intelligence agency of Israel.

==== Hijab double-down ====
Top Iranian government officials announced again that they will not change the Islamic Republic's mandatory hijab policy.

=== 5 December ===
A three-day shopkeeper and truck-driver strike took place as scheduled from 5 December to 7 December.

Witnesses interviewed by The Guardian reported that "guidance patrols" seemed to have stepped down their policing of hijab in recent months, possibly due to security forces being tied up with the suppression of protests.

=== 6 December ===
During a meeting with a state security council, Supreme leader Ali Khamenei commanded for "revolutionary reconstruction of the country's cultural system", according to Iranian state media. During the same meeting, he said: "It is necessary to revolutionise the country's cultural structure ... the supreme council should observe the weaknesses of culture in different fields of the country".

A 6 December BBC report independently verified the identities of more than 75 killed since the start of protests, including some who were not attending protests when killed. One verified victim was 7-year-old Hasti Narouei, who attended Friday prayers on 30 September with her grandmother, and allegedly suffocated after being hit by a tear gas canister during the subsequent Zahedan massacre.

=== 7 December ===
Iranian authorities have sentenced five people to death for allegedly killing a member of a paramilitary force affiliated with Iran's Islamic Revolutionary Guard.

=== 8 December ===
The first execution of the Mahsa Amini protests was on 8 December 2022, when Iran executed 23-year-old Mohsen Shekari, accused of blocking a road and using a machete to wound a police officer, on charges of moharebeh. Iran Human Rights director Mahmood Amiry-Moghaddam called Shekari's trial a "show trial without any due process". After Shekari's execution, Amnesty International warned that there were at least 12 other death row inmates at imminent risk of execution for similar crimes, while Iranian officials including Iran's chief of police, Hossein Ashtari, said that "[T]he police will not show restraint in dealing with security threats".

After Shekari's execution, Amnesty International revealed that a senior Iranian police commander had signed a document requesting the public execution of one prisoner connected with the protests "in the shortest time possible," specifically requesting that the execution be public "as a heart-warming gesture towards the security forces."

=== 11 December ===
On 11 December, the Neighbourhood Youth Alliance of Iran published a 43-point manifesto calling for the creation of a democratic government, supporting ethnic, gender, political and religious diversity, promoting cooperation among commercial organisations, trade unions, political groups and activists in and outside of Iran, calling for a secular state, and calling for the post-revolutionary government of Iran to be committed to the Universal Declaration of Human Rights, the International Covenant on Civil and Political Rights, the International Covenant on Economic, Social and Cultural Rights, the Convention on the Elimination of All Forms of Discrimination Against Women and the Convention on the Rights of the Child.

=== 12 December ===
The second execution of a protestor from the Mahsa Amini protests, which was the first that was held publicly, took place in Mashhad, when Majidreza Rahnavard was hanged from a crane by Iranian authorities for his participation in the protests.

=== 13 December ===
In response to the executions of Shekari and Rahnavard, the Neighbourhood Youth Alliance of Iran called for national level protests on 20–21 December.

=== 14 December ===
The UN Economic and Social Council expelled Iran from the UN Commission on the Status of Women, following a vote in which 29 Council member states voted to expel Iran and 16 members abstained. Eight Council members voted against the expulsion: Bolivia, China, Kazakhstan, Nicaragua, Nigeria, Oman, Russia, and Zimbabwe. Part of the reason for Russia's vote was its increased dependence on Iranian military support as it was carrying out its war in Ukraine.

=== 15 December ===
The UN General Assembly voted to condemn human rights violations in Iran.

=== 16 December ===
As the protests entered their fourth month, hundreds of protesters marched in Zahedan.

Actress Taraneh Alidoosti was arrested a week after a 9 December Instagram post in which she condemned Iran's execution of Mohsen Shekari.

=== 17 December ===
Oil workers in southern Iran protested, demanding higher wages and retirement bonuses.

=== 23 December ===
In response to the Iranian government's crackdown, Germany announced the halt of government-approved measures originally aimed at promoting trade with Iran.

The Iranian currency neared its record low; one US dollar sold for as much as 400,500 rials on the unofficial foreign exchange market on 23 December. The Iranian currency had lost as much as 23% of its value since the start of the widespread protests in September 2022. During Friday prayers in Zahedan, the Sunni cleric Molavi Abdolhamid denounced the government's crackdown. He stated: "My advice is not to beat up citizens. No government shoots its own citizens like this one… Let soldiers stay in their barracks".

=== 26–28 December ===
26 December was the 100th day of protests. The BBC called the protests "the longest-running anti-government protests in Iran" since 1979, and also stated that, unlike previous protests against the Islamic Republic, there was "emerging use" of Molotov cocktails against the government militia and against Hawza school.

According to retired Iranian footballer Ali Daei, Iran re-routed a plane heading from Tehran to Dubai to prevent Daei's wife and daughter from leaving the country. Iran later cited Daei and his wife's alleged "association with the groups against the Islamic revolution" as the reason for re-routing the plane.

Petrochemical workers held anti-government strikes in Abadan during 26–28 December. Protests took place in Kohgiluyeh and Boyer-Ahmad province, West Azerbaijan Province, Razavi Khorasan Province and Kurdistan Province on 28 December. Protest organisers called for protests and strikes to be held on 29 December and on 6–8 January 2023.

=== 30–31 December ===
On 31 December, protests took place in six provinces and industrial and merchant strikes took place in three provinces.

Mehdi Bahman, an Iranian illustrator, is sentenced to death for giving an interview with an Israeli news outlet.

== 2023 ==
=== 1 January ===
Authorities detained two French nationals and a Belgian who were indicted. They were accused of espionage and having fomented the unrest in Iran.

Sara Khadem was warned against returning to Iran because she may be arrested for not covering her hair in Spain.

Iranian citizen Arshia Takdastan was sentenced to death, bringing the number of Iranians sentenced to death over the ongoing protests up to twelve (not including the two individuals already executed).

=== 7 January ===
The Islamic Republic authorities executed two other protestors, Mohammad Mehdi Karami and Mohammad Hosseini for allegations directly linked to Mahsa Amini protests.

=== 9 January ===
Hundreds of protesters gathered at the Rajayi-shahr Prison in Karaj when word circulated that protesters Mohammad Ghobadloo and Mohammad Boroughani had been transferred to solitary confinement ahead of their scheduled execution.

=== 11 January ===
After protests on 9 January, the Islamic Republic judicial officials announced that the Mohammad Boroughani's execution was suspended for a retrial.

=== 13 January ===
Shohreh Bayat was removed from the International Chess Federation (FIDE) commission of chess arbiters, in relation to her wearing of a "Women, Life, Freedom" T-shirt at a chess competition held in Iceland in October 2022. Her removal was attributed by a senior FIDE official to the commission's president, Arkady Dvorkovich, being "furious", while FIDE's official statement was that the reason was related to "activism" and that Bayat had disobeyed "direct instructions given to her to stop wearing slogans or mottos". Bayat interpreted the dismissal as being geopolitical solidarity of Dvorkovich, a former Russian deputy prime minister, with the Iranian government.

=== 16 January ===
12,000 people marched to the European Parliament in Strasbourg, France in solidarity with Iranian anti-government protesters.

=== 21 January ===
By 21 January the Iranian rial was around 450,000 rials to one US dollar, about 30% lower than its value before the Mahsa Amini protests began. The Voice of America estimated the Iranian inflation rate to be around 50%.

=== 23 January ===
On 23 January 2023, the U.S. Department of the Treasury's Office of Foreign Assets Control (OFAC) rolled out a new slate of sanctions: it designated Iran's Islamic Revolutionary Guard Corps Cooperative Foundation and five of its board members, the Deputy Minister of Intelligence and Security Naser Rashedi, and four senior IRGC commanders in Iran under human rights authorities. Brian E. Nelson, the US Terrorism Under-Secretary of Treasury, announced, "The United States remains committed to supporting the Iranian people in their demands for human rights and other fundamental freedoms." The US State Department posted the same announcement stating, "Today's actions are being taken pursuant to Executive Order 13553."

=== 26 January ===
U.S. Representative Claudia Tenney introduced "H.Con.Res.7 - Condemning the Iranian regime's human rights abuses against the brave women and men of Iran peacefully demonstrating in more than 133 cities," into the 118th Congress's House Foreign Affairs Committee on 01/09/2023. This Resolution passed the House on 25 January 2023 and was referred to the Senate Committee on Foreign Relations on 26 January 2023. The resolution condemned the Iranian regime for "misogynistic criminal statutes." 420 members of the House voted in favor of the Resolution. Thomas Massie (R-KY) was the lone "nay" voter.

=== 5 February ===
The President of Iran reduced the sentences (including early releases) of at least 1,000 protestors.

Shervin Hajipour was rewarded the Special Merit Award for Best Song for Social Change by First Lady Jill Biden at the 2023 Grammys.

=== 10 February ===
Around 10 February, eight prominent exiled dissidents from different factions agreed to unify against the Iranian regime: Crown Prince Reza Pahlavi, Masih Alinejad, Nazanin Boniadi, Hamed Esmaeilion, Shirin Ebadi, Abdullah Mohtadi, Golshifteh Farahani, and Ali Karimi. This constituted the most diverse opposition group since the 1979 Iranian Revolution.

=== 11 February ===
Iran celebrated the anniversary of the revolution. 20,000 protestors were still in prison.

=== 14 February ===
Around 14 February, Iran offered a limited amnesty to over 50 political prisoners, including Mohammad Rasoulof. The Times of Israel reported that protests had decreased over the winter.

Armed clashes erupted in Dehloran as security forces opened fire at the protesters. Protesters then returned fire injuring two security forces.

=== 15 February ===
The BBC reported that chess player Sara Khadem had been effectively forced into exile, following the release of arrest papers in Iran over her hijab-less appearance while playing chess at the December 2022 FIDE World Rapid and Blitz Chess Championships in Kazakhstan.

=== 17 February ===
Protesters took to the streets of several neighborhoods in Tehran as well as in the cities of Karaj, Isfahan, Qazvin, Rasht, Arak, Mashhad, Sanandaj, Qorveh, and Izeh in Khuzestan province, calling for regime change. These protests marked 40 days since the execution of Mohammad Mehdi Karami and Seyyed Mohammad Hosseini. DW characterized the protests as "the most widespread demonstrations in recent weeks".

=== 18 February ===
Kristen Stewart called for regime change in Iran at the Berlin International Film Festival.

=== 21 February ===
A CNN report identified dozens of alleged clandestine jails ("black sites") in which some detainees testified to being systematically tortured.

=== 26 February ===
The Iranian rial reached a new low, with a market exchange rate of 600,000 rials to one US dollar.

=== 5 March ===
Iran arrested journalist Ali Purtabatabaei, a prominent critic of Iran's response to the alleged mass poisonings of schoolgirls.

=== 6 March ===
The Ayatollah Khamenei publicly addressed for the first time the alleged mass poisonings that started on 30 November 2022 and which had recently grown in frequency. He acknowledged that hundreds had been admitted to hospital; another official disclosed a cumulative count of 1,104 schoolgirls admitted just in Khuzestan province. Subsequent reports from Iranian government officials were conflicting and opaque, including reports of arrests of unspecified suspects. As of 13 March, the Iranian government has not released data that would allow outside observers to assess the situation.

=== 8 March ===
UNESCO urged "thorough investigations and immediate actions" in reference to the reports of poisoning.

=== 10 March ===
Iranian opposition leaders that formed a coalition known as the Alliance for Democracy and Freedom in Iran on 10 February announced the release of the Masha Charter.

=== 13 March ===
Shiite Chief Justice Gholam-Hossein Mohseni-Eje'i announced 22,000 protesters have been pardoned ahead of the Muslim holy month of Ramadan.

A 13 March NPR article reported that a proportion of women in major urban cities continued to go hijab-less in public, and that the government had not generally been enforcing hijab laws on the street since the start of the Mahsa Amini protests.

=== 16 March ===
A 16 March France 24 article assessed that "protests have dwindled in many parts of Iran", but that hundreds continued to protest every week in the Sunni Baloch province of Sistan and Baluchestan.

=== 18 March ===
The CBC reported that "Protests continue in pockets of the country — most prominently in the southeast province of Sistan and Baluchestan." The Kurdistan Human Rights Network stated 121 or more Iranian Kurds had been killed since the start of the protest. HRANA stated the total number or Iranian protesters killed was 530 or more.

=== 24 March ===
RFE/RL reported "the protests have largely subsided across most of Iran", with the continued exception of the province of Sistan and Baluchestan.

== See also ==
- 2019–2020 Iranian protests § Timeline
- Iranian protests against compulsory hijab § Timeline
- Timeline of the 2009 Iranian election protests
- 2025 Iranian protests
