= Mahsa =

Mahsa or Mahsā (Persian: مهسا, lit. 'moon-like', pronounced [mæhˈsɒː]) is a feminine given name of Persian origin. The name has the meaning "like the moon". Mah (𐎶𐏃) is the Old Persian word for "moon", and -sā (ـسا), as a suffix, means "representing, alike, as".

Notable people with the name include:

- Mahsa Abdolzadeh (born 1985), Austrian politician, political scientist and women's rights and LGBT activist
- Mahsa Amini (1999–2022), Iranian-Kurdish woman whose death in the Islamic Republic of Iran's police custody sparked protests in Iran and in the world
- Mahsa Amrabadi (born 1984), Iranian journalist
- Mahsa Javar (born 1994), Iranian rower
- Mahsa Kadkhoda (born 1993), Iranian volleyball player
- Mahsa Mohaghegh, Iranian-born New Zealand computer engineer
- Mahsa Saberi (born 1993), Iranian volleyball player
- Mahsa Shahbazian (born 1984), Iranian musician, composer and Qanun player
- Mahsa Vahdat (born 1973), Persian classical and world music vocalist

== See also ==
- Mahsa (disambiguation)
