= Execution of Mohammad Ghobadlou =

Iranian prisoner (2000–2024)

Mohammad Ghobadlou
- محمد قبادلو
- Born: 2000
- Died: 23 January 2024 (aged 23)
- Cause of death: Execution by hanging
- Known for: Eighth execution related to the Mahsa Amini protests
- Criminal charges: Moharebeh ("waging war against God") and Murder
- Penalty: Death

Mohammed Ghobadlou (Persian: محمد قبادلو; 2000 – 23 January 2024) was an Iranian man executed for his participation in the 2022 Mahsa Amini protests. He was charged with murder and moharebeh, which translates to "waging war against God", and was sentenced to death. He was accused of running over Iranian special police units in Parand city with a car, killing Farid Karampour Hassanvand and injuring five of police units.

Ghobadlou and another prisoner sentenced to death, Mohammad Boroughani, emerged as new faces of outrage in Iran against political executions of Mahsa Amini protestors. On 9 January 2023, hundreds of protesters gathered at the Rajayi-shahr Prison in Karaj when word circulated that Ghobadlou and Boroughani had been transferred to solitary confinement ahead of their scheduled execution. In this gathering, Ghobadlou's mother made a speech and she was embraced by the crowd who supported her.

Boroughani's execution was halted on 11 January 2023, but Ghobadlou's execution was rescheduled to, and carried out on, 23 January 2024.

== Background ==
Thousands of protesters were detained as a result of the Mahsa Amini protests, and dozens were charged with offenses such as Moharebeh ("waging war against God") or Mofsed-e-filarz ("corruption on Earth"), which are punishable by death in the Islamic Republic of Iran. Iranian authorities executed four protestors, Mohsen Shekari, Majidreza Rahnavard, Mohammad Mehdi Karami, and Seyyed Mohammad Hosseini, in December 2022 and January 2023 for alleged crimes linked to the Mahsa Amini protests. In May 2023, Iran executed three more protestors who were convicted of Baghy ("rebellion against the Islamic government"): Saleh Mirhashemi, Majid Kazemi, and Saeed Yaghoobi.

Human rights groups monitoring Iranian authorities' responses to the Mahsa Amini protests accused the Iranian ruling regime of using executions as an intimidation tactic to "instill fear" in protestors, noting that in the aftermath of the protests, Iran saw an 83% rise in executions. Iran carried out more confirmed executions in 2022 than any other country, and in the first half of 2023, Iran carried out 36% more executions than they had in the first half of 2022.

=== Personal life ===
Ghobadlou was known to have bipolar disorder. Amnesty International reported that a psychiatric hospital had supervised Ghobadlou's condition since he was 15 years old, and the organisation also noted that people with mental disabilities are generally precluded from the death penalty under international law. Amnesty also accused Iranian officials of not carrying out "rigorous mental health assessments" despite the knowledge that Ghobadlou was mentally disabled. Human rights groups also accused officials of withholding Ghobadlou's bipolar medications from him and forbidding him from seeing his attorney during the first month of his imprisonment.

=== Reported crime ===
Ghobadlou was accused of running over a group of "government forces" during a Woman, Life, Freedom protest that took place in Robat Karim in September 2022; the crime allegedly resulted in the death of Farid Karampour Hassanvand, a police officer, as well as the injury of five other officers.

== Trial and appeal ==
On 29 October 2022, Ghobadlou faced trial before Judge Abolqasem Salavati. The court rejected the two lawyers of Ghobadlou and ordered a lawyer from the judicial system of the Islamic Republic's counselling centre. His own attorney strongly objected to Ghobadlou's proceeding in the trial. From the first day of his detention until court day, his attorney had no access to his case's documents. There were no photos of the charge, no records of medical jurisprudence, and other common documents of accidents.

On 24 December 2022, the Islamic Regime's Supreme Court announced it had upheld Ghobadlou's death sentence after rejecting his appeal.

Ghobadlou's lawyer announced on 26 August 2023 that following the confirmation of 50 psychiatrists in Iran regarding the necessity of a more thorough reexamination of Ghobadlou's case due to his mental illness, Branch 1 of the Supreme Court had annulled the death sentence and would refer the case to one of the branches of the Criminal Court 1 of Tehran.

Despite the ruling of Branch 1 of the Supreme Court, Ghobadlou's execution was carried out on 23 January 2024. Ghobadlou was executed alongside Farhad Salimi, a man described by the Death Penalty Information Center as a "Kurdish-Sunni political prisoner" who had been in custody since his 2010 arrest along six other political prisoners and had been on a hunger strike when he was executed. Salimi was the fourth of his group of seven to be executed, with two of his co-defendants being executed in November 2023, and one (Davoud Abdollahi) being executed on 2 January 2024, despite allegations that they, like Ghobadlou, were subjected to physical and psychological torture and intimidation to extract forced confessions.

== Responses ==
Ghobadlou's mother and lawyer were strongly opposed to the court's procedure.

Amir Raeisian, his attorney, asserted that the accusations of running over IR's guards were too suspicious. Also, his mother complained: "They have found my child helpless; they interrogated and trialled my boy with no lawyer and they sentenced him to death in his court's first session."

Amnesty International reacted in a tweet: "The head of the judiciary must STOP the arbitrary execution of Mohamed Ghobadlou, suddenly & unlawfully scheduled for tomorrow. The case of this young man with a disability arrested in connection with the 2022 protests has been marred by torture and secretive proceedings."

== See also ==
- Death sentences during the Mahsa Amini protests
