= Mahsa (disambiguation) =

Mahsa or Mahsā (Persian: مهسا, lit. 'like the moon', pronounced [mæhˈsɒː]) is a feminine given name of Persian origin. It is also a name commonly used for the following:

== Name ==
- Mahsa (name)

== Mahsa Amini-related ==
- Deaths during the Mahsa Amini protests
- Death sentences during the Mahsa Amini protests
- Detainees of the Mahsa Amini protests
- Timeline of the Mahsa Amini protests

== Other uses ==
- MAHSA University, medical university in Petaling Jaya, Malaysia

== See also ==
- Mahsas (disambiguation)
