= Death sentences during the Mahsa Amini protests =

Death sentences during the Mahsa Amini protests is a list of Iranian citizens sentenced to death or charged with crimes punishable by death in the Islamic Republic of Iran during the Mahsa Amini protests. Following rushed trials that were widely criticized by human rights organizations, the Islamic Republic has executed eight protestors, Mohsen Shekari, Majidreza Rahnavard, Mohammad Mehdi Karami, Seyyed Mohammad Hosseini, Saleh Mirhashemi, Majid Kazemi, Saeed Yaghoobi and Mohammad Ghobadloo. Dozens of protesters have been charged with offenses that are punishable by death in Iran.

The list does not include demonstrators who have been killed by police during the protests, and it does not include people who received death sentences for convictions unrelated to the protests.

== Overview ==
Thousands of protesters have been detained as a result of the Mahsa Amini protests, and dozens have been charged with offenses such as Moharebeh ("Waging War Against God") or Mofsed-e-filarz ("Corruption on Earth"), which are punishable by death under the Islamic Republic of Iran.

Analysts have warned that the Islamic Republic is "determined to carry out mass executions," and "keeps the execution cases as vague as possible to 'confuse' domestic and international reactions until the last minute," said Hossein Bastani, a prominent political analyst for BBC Persian. He continued that "worldwide, practical reactions might still prevent a human disaster."

Many of the trials have taken place in Iran's Islamic Revolutionary Court system. The system has received international criticism for holding trials behind closed doors and often not allowing defendants to review the evidence used against them. In Tehran, most trials have been presided over by Judge Abolqasem Salavati, who faces U.S. sanctions for meting out harsh punishments. A statement by the United States Department of the Treasury criticized Salvati for handing down more than 100 death sentences and lengthy prison sentences to political prisoners, human rights activists, media workers, and "others seeking to exercise freedom of assembly."

== Executions ==
On 8 December 2022, Iran executed Mohsen Shekari for Moharebeh related to allegations that he blocked a road and stabbed a Basij militiaman during a protest of Amini's death. Shekari's execution was the first to be carried out as a direct result of the protests. Four days later, on 12 December, Iran publicly executed Majidreza Rahnavard by hanging him from a crane after he was convicted of Moharebeh following allegations that he murdered two Basij militiamen. Rahnavard's execution was the first public execution related to the Mahsa Amini protests. Both Shekari and Rahnavard were allegedly subjected to torture to extract coerced and false confessions.

After nearly a month, on 7 January 2023, Iran carried out the executions of Mohammad Mehdi Karami and Seyyed Mohammad Hosseini, who, like Shekari and Rahnavard, were accused of crimes involving alleged attacks on Basij militiamen; they were convicted of Mofsed-e-filarz. Both were also allegedly subjected to torture, and Karami was allegedly subjected to sexual violence at the hands of his jailers; both asserted their innocence of the charges that led to their executions. Human rights organizations accused Iranian authorities of using "shoddy evidence" to convict both men.

After a hiatus lasting over four months, Iran carried out the executions of three men – Saleh Mirhashemi, Majid Kazemi, and Saeed Yaghoobi – on 19 May 2023. Like Shekari and Rahnavard, the three men were convicted of Moharebeh despite allegations that Iranian authorities subjected them to torture to extract forced confessions. One of Kazemi's family members accused Iranian agents of visiting the family two days after Kazemi's execution, assaulting his brothers and parents, and arresting three of his siblings.

Human rights groups have criticized Iran for their elevated rate of executions in the face of the protests, even for crimes unrelated to the protests, like drug offenses. Human rights groups have accused Iranian officials of using capital punishment as a tool to intimidate the public and quell dissent.

== Responses ==
Iranian citizens, human rights groups, and the international community have put immense pressure on the Islamic Republic government to discontinue political executions. Human rights organizations have condemned the use of "sham trials designed to intimidate protestors" and the "chilling use of the death penalty in rush trials." United Nations human rights experts have "raised alarm over detained protesters" and condemned death sentences "following unfair trials" resulting in "arbitrary deprivation of life." According to Amnesty International, "several defendants were tortured, and their torture-tainted 'confessions' were used as evidence. State media broadcast forced 'confessions' of at least nine defendants prior to trial."

Numerous members of parliament in European countries, including those in Germany, Sweden, France, and Netherlands have taken on the political sponsorship of protesters who are currently facing the death penalty.

Following pressure from both inside and outside the country, on December 16, 2022, the Islamic Republic let 17-year-old Sonia Sharifi out on bail. She had been reportedly charged with Moharebeh ("waging war against God"), but just before her release, the prosecutor stated that she has not yet been formally charged.

The death sentences against co-accused Hamid Ghare-Hasanlou, Hossein Mohammadi, and Reza Aria were overturned on January 3, 2023, "due to the existence of defects in the proceedings," and retrial was ordered by the Supreme Court of Iran.

The U.S. envoy for Iran, Robert Malley, tweeted that Iran's executions of protesters are "an affront to the human rights and basic dignity of all Iranians." The European Union has demanded that Iran abolish the death penalty.

== List of people currently facing the death penalty ==
The following list contains information on many of those currently facing death sentences in Iran directly for their involvement in the 2022 Mahsa Amini protests, triggered by the death of Mahsa Amini.

Name	Age	Details of the arrest	Charge	Description by the prosecutor	Judge	Trial	Sentence	Appeal	Further information	Ref.
Mohsen Shekari (Persian: محسن شکاری)	22	Tehran protests	Moharebeh ("Waging War Against God")	Blocked a street in Tehran	Abolqasem Salavati	November 1, 2022	Death	Failed	Executed by hanging on December 8, 2022	
Majidreza Rahnavard (Persian: مجیدرضا رهنورد)	23	Mashhad	Moharebeh ("Waging War Against God")	Allegedly killed two Basij militia forces	Hadi Mansouri	November 29, 2022	Death	Unknown	Executed by public hanging on December 12, 2022	
Mohammad Mehdi Karami (Persian: محمد مهدی کرمی)	21	Hadis Najafi's 40th day memorial	Mofsed-e-filarz ("Corruption on Earth")	Allegedly involved in attacking a Basij militia by the name of Ajamian	Moosa Asefolhosseini	November 30, 2022	Death	Failed	Executed by hanging on January 7, 2023	
Seyyed Mohammad Hosseini (Persian: سیدمحمد حسینی)	39	Hadis Najafi's 40th day memorial	Mofsed-e-filarz ("Corruption on Earth")	Allegedly involved in attacking a Basij militia by the name of Ajamian	Moosa Asefolhosseini	November 30, 2022	Death	Failed	Executed by hanging on January 7, 2023	
Saleh Mirhashemi (Persian: صالح میرهاشمی)	37	Isfahan	Baghy ("Rebellion against the Islamic government")	Allegedly involved in attacking Basij militia	Morteza Barati		Death	Unknown	Executed by hanging on May 19, 2023	
Majid Kazemi (Persian: مجید کاظمی)		Isfahan	Baghy ("Rebellion against the Islamic government")	Allegedly involved in attacking Basij militia	Morteza Barati		Death	Unknown	Executed by hanging on May 19, 2023	
Saeed Yaghoobi (Persian: سعید یعقوبی)		Isfahan	Baghy ("Rebellion against the Islamic government")	Allegedly involved in attacking Basij militia	Morteza Barati		Death	Unknown	Executed by hanging on May 19, 2023	
Mohammad Ghobadloo (Persian: محمد قبادلو)	22	Tehran protests	Moharebeh ("Waging War Against God"), Mofsed-e-filarz ("Corruption on Earth")	Allegedly involved in the death of a security force	Abolqasem Salavati	October 29, 2022	Death	Failed (December 24, 2022)	Prohibited from selecting their own lawyer. Trial was held in secret; his defense attorney was barred from attending Clara Bünger, a member of the German parliament, sponsored him on December 12, 2022; and Caroline Lucas, a member of the British parliament, sponsored him in January 2023 Executed on January 23, 2024	
Mohammad Boroughani (Persian: محمد بروغنی)	18	Tehran protests	Moharebeh ("Waging War Against God")	Setting fire to the office of the governor of Pakdasht	Abolqasem Salavati	October 29, 2022	Death	Failed but execution is temporarily suspended	Prohibited from selecting their own lawyer, Martin Diedenhofen, a member of the German parliament, sponsored him on December 9, 2022	
Shoaib Mirblouchezhi Rigi (Persian: شعیب میربلوچزهی ریگی)	18	Zahedan	Mofsed-e-filarz ("Corruption on Earth")			December 19, 2022	Death		Prohibited from selecting his own lawyer, Confessions extracted through torture	
Manouchehr Mehman Navaz (Persian: منوچهر مهمان‌نواز)	45	Tehran protests	Moharebeh ("Waging War Against God")	Disturbing public order and participating in illegal demonstrations	Mohammadreza Amoozad	October 30, 2022	Death	Unknown	Prohibited from selecting their own lawyer	
Kambiz Khorvat (Persian: کامبیز خروت)	20	Zahedan	Moharebeh ("Waging War Against God"), Mofsed-e-filarz ("Corruption on Earth")				Death		Prohibited from selecting his own lawyer	
Mehdi Bahman (Persian: مهدی بهمن)		Tehran					Death			
Mehdi Mohammadi Fard (Persian: مهدی محمدی‌فرد)	19	Sari					Death (twice)			
Arshia Takdastan (Persian: عرشیا تک‌دستان)	18	Nowshahr					Death			
Javad Roohi (Persian: جواد روحی)	35	Nowshahr	Moharebeh ("Waging War Against God"), Mofsed-e-filarz ("Corruption on Earth"), Apostasy				Death			
Mansoor Dehmardeh (Persian: منصور دهمرده)	22	Zahedan	Mofsed-e-filarz ("Corruption on Earth")				Death			
Ebrahim Naroyi (Persian: ابراهیم نارویی)	25	Zahedan	Moharebeh ("Waging War Against God")				Death			
Mahan Sadrat Marani (Persian: ماهان صدرات مرنی)	24	Tehran protests	Moharebeh ("Waging War Against God")	Blocked the street and set fire; destroyed the plaintiff's phone and injured him with a knife	Iman Afshari	November 3, 2022	Death	Accepted	Prohibited from selecting his own lawyer The plaintiff withdrew his lawsuit and the execution has been temporarily suspended	
Mohsen Rezazadeh Gharaghloo (Persian: محسن رضازاده قراقلو)		Tehran protests	Moharebeh ("Waging War Against God")	Participated in creating a fire, colluded for crimes against the national security	Abolqasem Salavati	October 29, 2022			Prohibited from selecting their own lawyer	
Saeed Shirazi (Persian: سعید شیرازی)		Tehran protests	Mofsed-e-filarz ("Corruption on Earth")	Incitement to crimes against the security, disturbing public order	Abolqasem Salavati	October 29, 2022			Prohibited from selecting their own lawyer	
Saman Seydi (Persian: سامان صیدی) also known as Saman Yasin	24	Tehran protests	Moharebeh ("Waging War Against God")	Shooting three times with a handgun	Abolqasem Salavati	October 29, 2022	Death	Accepted	Prohibited from selecting their own lawyer The state-appointed public defender did not have access to the evidence presented by the prosecutor Carlos Kasper, a member of the German parliament, sponsored him on December 9, 2022	
Abolfazl Mehri Hossein Hajilou (Persian: ابوالفضل مهری حسین حاجیلو)		Tehran protests	Confronting the Islamic government	Set fire	Abolqasem Salavati	October 29, 2022			Prohibited from selecting their own lawyer	
Sahand Nourmohammad-Zadeh (Persian: سهند نورمحمدزاده)	26	Tehran protests	Moharebeh ("Waging War Against God")	Blocked a highway in Tehran and set a trash bin on fire		November 7, 2022	Death	Accepted	Colum Eastwood, a member of the British parliament, sponsored him in January 2023	
Akbar Ghaffari (Persian: اکبر غفاری)		Tehran protests	Moharebeh ("Waging War Against God")							
Hamid Ghare Hasanlou (Persian: حمید قره‌حسنلو)	53	Hadis Najafi's 40th day memorial	Mofsed-e-filarz ("Corruption on Earth")	Involved in attacking a Basij militia by the name of Ajamian	Moosa Asefolhosseini	November 30, 2022	Death in the lower court, but overturned by the supreme court		Prohibited from selecting their own lawyer	
Hossein Mohammadi (Persian: حسین محمدی)	26	Hadis Najafi's 40th day memorial	Mofsed-e-filarz ("Corruption on Earth")	Involved in attacking a Basij militia by the name of Ajamian	Moosa Asefolhosseini	November 30, 2022	Death in the lower court, but overturned by the supreme court		Prohibited from selecting their own lawyer	
Reza Aria (Persian: رضا آریا)	43	Hadis Najafi's 40th day memorial	Mofsed-e-filarz ("Corruption on Earth")	Involved in attacking a Basij militia by the name of Ajamian	Moosa Asefolhosseini	November 30, 2022	Death in the lower court, but overturned by the supreme court		Prohibited from selecting their own lawyer	
Milad Armoon (Persian: میلاد آرمون)		Tehran, Ekbatan	Assault resulting in murder	Involved in attacking a Basij militia by the name of Arman Alivardi					He denied attacking the militiaman on the Iran's state TV, Jytte Guteland, a member of Sweden parliament, sponsored him on December 14, 2022	
Behzad Hesari (Persian: بهزاد حصاری)		Tehran, Ekbatan	Assault resulting in murder	Involved in attacking a Basij militia by the name of Arman Alivardi						
Nastooh Nikkhah (Persian: نستوه نیکخواه)		Tehran, Ekbatan	Assault resulting in murder	Involved in attacking a Basij militia by the name of Arman Alivardi						
Mehdi Jahani (Persian: مهدی جهانی)		Tehran, Ekbatan	Assault resulting in murder	Involved in attacking a Basij militia by the name of Arman Alivardi						
Mohammad Pasandian (Persian: محمد پسندیان)		Tehran, Ekbatan	Assault resulting in murder	Involved in attacking a Basij militia by the name of Arman Alivardi						
Amir Reza Nasr Azadani (Persian: امیررضا نصرآزادانی)	26	Isfahan	Baghy ("Rebellion against the Islamic government"), Moharebeh ("Waging War Against God")	Involved in attacking two Basij militia and a police officer					Andrew Western, a member of the British parliament, sponsored him in January 2023	
Abolfazl Badi-elah (Persian: ابوالفضل بادی‌اله)		Isfahan	Baghy ("Rebellion against the Islamic government")	Involved in attacking two Basij militia and a police officer						
Soheil Jahangiri (Persian: سهیل جهانگیری)		Isfahan	Baghy ("Rebellion against the Islamic government")	Involved in attacking two Basij militia and a police officer						
Hossein Kazemi (Persian: حسین کاظمی)		Isfahan	Baghy ("Rebellion against the Islamic government")	Involved in attacking two Basij militia and a police officer						
Mehdi Mashayekhi (Persian: مهدی مشایخی)		Isfahan	Baghy ("Rebellion against the Islamic government")	Involved in attacking two Basij militia and a police officer						
Faramarz Salehi (Persian: فرامرز صالحی)		Isfahan	Baghy ("Rebellion against the Islamic government")	Involved in attacking two Basij militia and a police officer						
Jaber Mirhashemi (Persian: جابر میرهاشمی)		Isfahan	Baghy ("Rebellion against the Islamic government")	Involved in attacking two Basij militia and a police officer						
Parham Parvari (Persian: پرهام پروری)	25	Tehran protests	Moharebeh ("Waging War Against God")							
Ebrahim Rigi (Persian: ابراهیم ریگی)	24	Zahedan	Moharebeh ("Waging War Against God")						Richard Thomson, a member of the British parliament, sponsored him in January 2023	
Abdoldoostar Zolfaghari (Persian: عبدالدوستار ذوالفقاری)		Zahedan	Moharebeh ("Waging War Against God")						More information is needed	
Mahsa Mohammadi (Persian: مهسا محمدی)			Sabbe Nabi (Insulting Prophet Muhammad)	She is charged based on only a tweet						
Makan Davari (Persian: ماکان داوری)		Langarud	Moharebeh ("Waging War Against God")						More information is needed	
Dena Sheybani (Persian: دنا شیبانی)	34	Shiraz	Moharebeh ("Waging War Against God")	Attempted to detonate a bomb in Shiraz					Confessions extracted through torture Rachel Hopkins, a member of the British parliament, sponsored her in January 2023	
Eshraq Najadabadi (Persian: اشراق نجف‌آبادی)		Shiraz	Moharebeh ("Waging War Against God")	Attempted to detonate a bomb in Shiraz					Confessions extracted through torture	
Mohammad Khiveh (Persian: محمد خیوه)		Shiraz	Moharebeh ("Waging War Against God")	Attempted to detonate a bomb in Shiraz					Confessions extracted through torture	
Hesam Mousavi (Persian: حسام موسوی)		Shiraz	Moharebeh ("Waging War Against God")	Attempted to detonate a bomb in Shiraz					Confessions extracted through torture	
Amir Arsalan Mahdavi (Persian: امیرارسلان مهدوی)		Shiraz	Moharebeh ("Waging War Against God")	Attempted to detonate a bomb in Shiraz					Confessions extracted through torture	
Karvan Shahi Parvaneh (Persian: کاروان شاهی‌پروانه)		Oshnavieh	Moharebeh ("Waging War Against God")				Death (in absentia)			
Reza Eslamdoost (Persian: رضا اسلام‌دوست)		Oshnavieh	Moharebeh ("Waging War Against God")				Death		More information is needed	
Hazhar Ahmadi (Persian: هژار احمدی)		Oshnavieh	Moharebeh ("Waging War Against God")				Death		More information is needed	
Shahram Maroof Mola (Persian: شهرام معروف مولا)		Oshnavieh	Moharebeh ("Waging War Against God")				Death		More information is needed	
Ayoob Aghliani (Persian: ایوب آغلیانی)		Oshnavieh							More information is needed	
Mansoor Hout (Persian: منصور حوت)		Zahedan	Moharebeh ("Waging War Against God"), Mofsed-e-filarz ("Corruption on Earth")						Prohibited from selecting their own lawyer	
Nezam Hout (Persian: نظام حوت)		Zahedan	Moharebeh ("Waging War Against God"), Mofsed-e-filarz ("Corruption on Earth")						Prohibited from selecting their own lawyer	
Toomaj Salehi (Persian: توماج صالحی)		Isfahan	Moharebeh ("Waging War Against God"), Mofsed-e-filarz ("Corruption on Earth")	Propagandizing activities against the state, forming illegal groups, cooperating with the hostile governments			Death		Ye-One Rhie, a member of the German parliament, sponsored him on December 9, 2022	

== See also ==
- Deaths during the Mahsa Amini protests
- Political repression in the Islamic Republic of Iran
