= Abolqasem Salavati =

Iranian judge

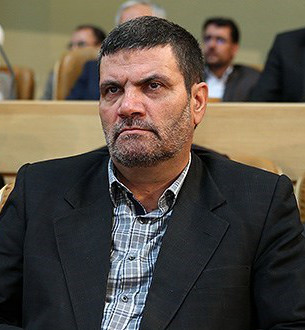

Head of the 15th branch of the Islamic Revolutionary Court
- Incumbent
- Assumed office 5 December 2009
- Appointed by: Sadeq Larijani
- Preceded by: Mohammad Moghiseh

Judge of the Islamic Revolutionary Court
- Incumbent
- Assumed office 1 July 2002
- Appointed by: Mahmoud Hashemi Shahroudi

Personal details
- Born: 16 July 1967 (age 59) Tuyserkan, Iran
- Spouse: Parvin Shiri (died 2023)
- Children: 2
- Education: University of Judicial Sciences and Administrative Services; University of Tehran
- Nickname(s): Judge Salavati; Iran's Hanging Judge

Abolqasem Salavati (Persian: ابوالقاسم صلواتی) (born 16 July 1967) is an Iranian judge and former head of the 15th branch of the Islamic Revolutionary Court in Tehran, Iran. In recent years, he had been the judge of numerous controversial cases. He has been sanctioned by the United States and the European Union.

He is one of the judges whom human rights organizations have highlighted as being the instruments of a crackdown on journalists and political activists under the influence of Iran's intelligence and security apparatus. Besides Salavati, the other revolutionary court judges include Mohammad Moghiseh, former justices Yahya Pirabbasi and Hassan Zare Dehnavi (known as judge Haddad), judge of Court of Media, Bijan Ghasemzadeh, and appeal judges Hassan Babaee, Ahmad Zargar and Qazi Sadat. These judges are accused of overseeing miscarriages of justice in trials in which journalists, lawyers, political activists, and members of Iran's ethnic and religious minorities have been condemned to lengthy prison terms, lashes, and even execution.

== Career ==
Iranian human rights and political activists call him Iran's Hanging Judge along with Mohammad Moghiseh and Yahya Pirabbasi.

In September 2014 he presided over the case of a man, Mohsen Amiraslani, executed for heresy for describing Jonah and the Whale as an allegory.

On 1 June 2015, judge Salavati convicted the cartoonist Atena Farghadani to 12 years and nine months in prison on the charges of colluding against national security, spreading propaganda against the system, and insulting members of the parliament through her artwork. She had depicted Iranian government officials as monkeys and goats in protest of a draft law that would outlaw voluntary sterilization and restrict access to measures of birth control.

In November 2022, Salavati presided over the trial of Mohsen Shekari. Shekari was convicted of injuring a member of Iran's Basij militia during the Mahsa Amini protests. He was found guilty of drawing a weapon, with the intention of killing, causing terror and disturbing the order and security of society, as well as of Moharebeh (waging war against God). Shekari was sentenced to death despite Salavati having the choice to impose a lighter sentence, such as deportation. Mohsen was 22 years old when he was executed by hanging on 8 December 2022.

=== Judicial rulings ===
- Mohammad Gholamzadeh sentenced to 5 years imprisonment, charged with conspiring by participating in student assemblies.
- Supervised a preliminary session for several detainees of the Mahsa Amini protests, issuing charges for 315 people, including:
  - Mohammad Ghobadlou and Saeed Shirazi charged with Efsad-E-Fel Arz, or loosely translated, as Corruption on Earth.
  - Saman Seyyedi charged with assembly and conspiring to act against national security.
  - Mohammad Boroughani charged with moharebeh.
  - Abdolfazl Mehri-Hossein Hajilou charged with opposing the Islamic government by setting a public transport vehicle ablaze.
  - Mohsen Rezazadeh Gharogholou charged with moharebeh, assembly, and conspiring to act against national security.
- Mostafa Tajzadeh sentenced to a total of 8 years imprisonment, charged with assembly and conspiring to act against national security (5 years), distribution of false information (2 years), and advertising against the government (1 year). Tajzadeh's lawyer, Houshang Pourbabaee, tweeted that his client did not appeal the sentence and will be serving 5 years per law.
- Erfan Mobaraki was accused of espionage, collaborating with hostile governments and Efsad-E-Fel Arz, or corruption on earth, sentenced to 10 years imprisonment and execution. According to Tasnim News, he has been providing classified documents to European countries.
- Reza Eslami, professor of human rights at Shahid Beheshti University, sentenced to 7 years imprisonment and banned from teaching and leaving the country. Eslami had previously been accused of cooperating with the US against the Islamic Republic by hosting a workshop in the Czech Republic. He denies having any involvement with the US government, stating that the American party was an NGO and he was unaware of any affiliations between the NGO and the US government. 14 of his 15 students were pardoned; however, one person was referred to the general parquet on the basis of removing the mandatory hijab in Turkey.
- Kameel Ahmady, sentenced to 9 years imprisonment and a 60,000€ fine, charged with cooperation with the government of the enemy. He has allegedly been pushing for socio-cultural reforms, such as raising the minimum age requirement for marriage. According to Tasnim News, Ahmady had been in contact with several European embassies in Iran, had submitted a falsified report to the United Nations special rapporteur against the Islamic Republic, and traveled to Israel disguised as a BBC reporter.
- Hoda Amid, women's rights activist, sentenced to 8 years imprisonment, a 2 year limitation imposed on her social rights, and a 2 year ban from practicing law. She was charged with cooperating with the US government against the Islamic Republic on affairs pertaining to women and the family, according to section 508 of the Islamic Prosecution Laws.
- Najme Vahedi, women's right activist, sentenced to 7 years imprisonment, and a 2 year limitation imposed on her social rights. She was similarly charged as Hoda Amid, during the same court session, with cooperation with the US against the Islamic Republic.
- Emad Sharghi, an Iranian-American, sentenced to 10 years imprisonment, charged with espionage.

=== Controversy ===
Salavati is among the 32 officials sanctioned by the European Union in April 2011 who have committed human rights abuses after the 2009 disputed election.

In December 2019, the U.S. Treasury Department sanctioned Salavati for "censorship or other activities that prohibit, limit, or penalize the exercise of freedom of expression or assembly by citizens of Iran".

A political prisoner's remark on Salavati

He [Salavati] is an awfully calm person and issues serious rulings, such as death sentences with a smile on his lips. His court sessions are very short, at times, as short as five minutes.

— Ramin Chavoshi, Source
