= Harabah =

Harabah may refer to:

- haraba, the Arabic root verb of Hirabah, a category of crimes in Islamic law
- harabah, a type of head covering for Oriental Orthodox Christian women (See also burqa.)
