= Mohammad Boroughani =

Iranian prisoner

- Born: March 29, 2003 (age 23)
- Known for: Death sentence related to the Mahsa Amini protests
- Criminal charges: Moharebeh ("Waging War Against God")
- Penalty: Death

Mohammad Boroughani (Persian: محمد بروغنی; born 29 March 2003) is an Iranian man facing a death sentence for his participation in the Mahsa Amini protests. He was found guilty of Moharebeh, which translates to "Waging War Against God," and was sentenced to death. Boroughani and another death-row inmate, Mohammad Ghobadloo, have emerged as new faces of outrage in Iran in response to the political executions of Mahsa Amini protestors. Hundreds of demonstrators gathered at Karaj's Rajayi-shahr Prison on January 9, 2023, when word spread that Boroughani and Ghobadloo had been sent to solitary confinement before of their scheduled execution. Boroughani's execution was temporarily halted two days later. Boroughani's trial on October 29, 2022, was also notable because it was the first trial directly linked to the Mahsa Amini protests, which drew widespread condemnation from human rights organizations and the international community.

== Arrest and allegations by Iranian officials ==
In late September or early October 2022, Boroughani was one of the protesters detained by Iranian officials during the Pakdasht demonstrations. Iranian officials accused him of deliberately setting fire to the Pakdasht governor's office. He was charged with Moharebeh, which translates to "Waging War Against God," because he allegedly brandished a machete while leading a mob in an assault on the Pakdasht governor's office, set fire to the building, and attacked and injured a government official. Officials have also accused him, based on the content of his postings on social media, of inciting the participation of his fellow citizens in the protests.

== Trial, appeals, and criticism ==
The court hearing for Boroughani took place on 29 October 2022, in Tehran's Islamic Revolutionary Court, with Judge Abolqasem Salavati presiding over the proceedings. According to Sharia law, he was judged guilty of the crime of Moharebeh, which carries the death penalty. The court did not let Boroughani choose his own attorney to represent him. (The Inquisitorial system in Iran is in accordance with Islamic law.) Boroughani was tried with five other protestors who were all charged with crimes punishable by death, most notably Moharebeh ("Waging War Against God") and Mofsed-e-filarz ("Corruption on Earth"). Judge Salavati had the ability to impose a lesser punishment, which may have included deportation of the defendant, but he chose not to do so.

Judge Salavati faces U.S. sanctions for meting out harsh punishments. In a statement, the United States Department of the Treasury criticized Salavati for handing down more than one hundred death sentences and lengthy prison sentences to political prisoners, human rights activists, media workers, and "others seeking to exercise their freedom of assembly".

Boroughani filed an appeal against the decision, and on 11 December 2022, the Supreme Court of Iran affirmed the verdict, despite the fact that Boroughani was not represented by his lawyer at the time of the appeal.

== Responses ==
=== Iranian citizens ===
Several activists, lawyers, and Iranian citizens have condemned Boroughani's death sentence on social media. Hundreds of protesters gathered at the Rajayi-shahr Prison in Karaj on January 9, 2023, when word circulated that Boroughani and another death-row prisoner, Mohammad Ghobadloo, had been transferred to solitary confinement ahead of their scheduled execution. Boroughani's execution was temporarily halted two days later.

=== Activists and human rights organizations ===
Amnesty International called on Iranian officials to "stop using the death penalty as a tool of political repression against protesters in their desperate attempt to end the popular uprising." On 14 December 2022, Amnesty warned that Boroughani's execution might be imminent, noting that he "[had] been moved to Rajai Shahr prison in Karaj, Alborz province".

=== International officials ===
Martin Diedenhofen, a member of the German parliament, announced on 9 December 2022, that he would take "political sponsorship" of Boroughani. Political patronage or sponsorship in Germany is a mechanism that allows members of parliament to pick a particular political prisoner for the purpose of using their political influence to advocate for the prisoner's release. Generally speaking, this is accomplished through addressing the ambassador as well as the appropriate governmental and international agencies that are concerned with human rights.

== See also ==
- Death sentences during the Mahsa Amini protests
- Mohammad Ghobadloo
- Execution of Mohsen Shekari
- Execution of Majidreza Rahnavard
- Execution of Mohammad Mehdi Karami
- Execution of Mohammad Hosseini
