= Masoud Bastani =

Iranian journalist

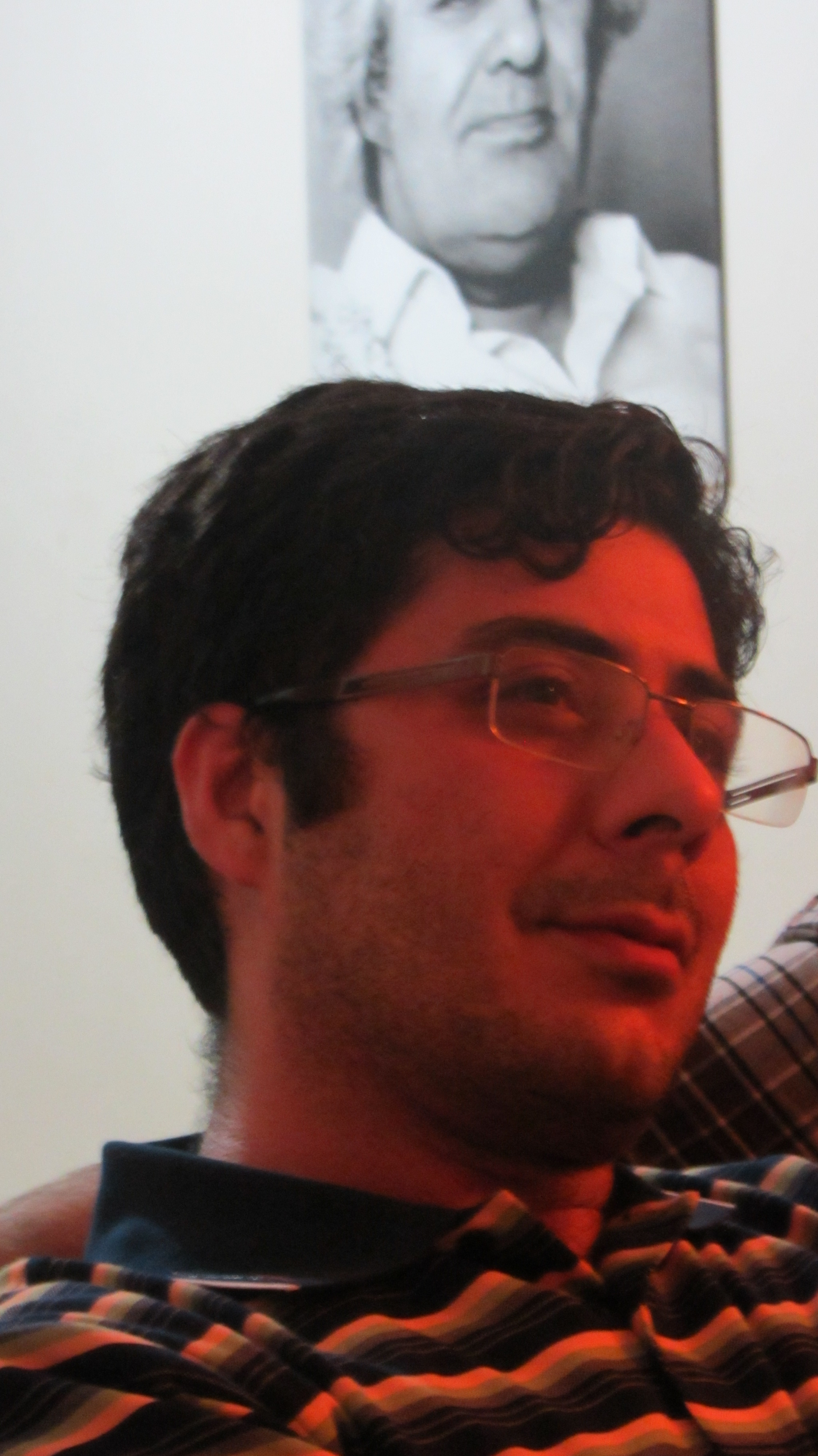
- Born: Masoud Moradi Bastani; 12 May 1978; Arak, Iran
- Notable credit: Editor-in-chief Jomhouriat Website
- Spouse: Mahsa Amrabadi

Masoud Moradi Bastani (born 12 May 1978 in Arak) is an Iranian reformist journalist. Throughout his career, he was arrested several times, the last of which was on July 5, 2009, during protests after the disputed Iranian presidential election. He was then given a six-year prison term. Since his arrest, he has never been allowed to leave the prison and there are serious concerns about his health.

== See also ==
- Human rights in Iran
