= Mohammad Amin Valian =

Iranian student (born 1989)

Mohammad Amin Valian (born March, 31 1989) is an Iranian student who was sentenced to death for participating in a 28 December 2009 demonstration protesting the 2009 presidential election in Iran. According to elple.net, charges listed against him were "Moharebeh, conspiracy to undermine national security, spreading propaganda, insulting high government officials." Among his crimes are

chanting "Death to the dictator;" statements released by the Central Council of Islamic Association of Damghan Science University, of which he is a member; and arranging debates between two marginal election candidates at the university. The evidence used against him included pictures of him throwing rocks at an Ashura protest

He was convicted of Moharebeh, or defiance of God, under Iranian Islamic law. Valian was an electoral campaigner in the town of Damghan for 2009 presidential candidate Mir-Hossein Mousavi, and is also a member of reformist student group called Office for Strengthening Unity and studied at Damaghan Science University.

Valian is one of 11 people sentenced to death so far for taking part in opposition protests challenging the legitimacy of the re-election of Mahmoud Ahmadinejad. As of March 2010, two of the eleven have been executed.

Iranian opposition leaders and some Islamic scholars have criticised the use of moharabeh and the death penalty against street protests, and in a 5 March 2010 statement the US government criticized his sentence as "disproportionate."

== See also ==
- Timeline of December 2009 Iranian election protests
