= Abdolreza Ghanbari =

Iranian convicted for waging war against God

Abdolreza Ghanbari (born c. 1968) is an Iranian university lecturer convicted of moharebeh (waging war against God). Initially condemned to death, he had his sentence commuted to 15 years in 2013.

Ghanbari is a lecturer at Payam e Nour University and a married father of two. In 2007, he was detained for 120 days and sentenced to a six-month suspension from teaching and exiled from Sari to Pakdasht. He was arrested at his home in Pakdasht (southwest of the capital of Tehran) on January 4, 2010, in the wake of Ashura (December 27, 2009) protest against the election of President Ahmadinejad. He was held at Evin Prison and confessed under duress to charges. He was sentenced to death by Judge Salavati in branch 15 of the Islamic Revolutionary Court on the charge of "moharebeh through ties with hostile groups [against] the regime". Possession of suspicious e-mails and contact with a TV station outside Iran were cited as reasons to justify the charges.

His death sentence was confirmed by Tehran's Appeal Court, Branch 36, in April 2010. His death sentence was commuted to imprisonment in September 2010, but this seems to have been overturned, and a request for pardon of the death sentence was rejected on February 28, 2012, by the Commission of Justice in Tehran, clearing the way for authorities to proceed with his execution. Complicating his situation is the fact that his lawyer Nasrin Sotoudeh was herself condemned to a six-year sentence in Evin Prison for "propaganda against the regime" and "acting against national security". In June 2023, the Tehran Revolutionary Court commuted Ghanbari's sentence to 15 years in prison and internal exile to Borazjan in southern Iran.

Abdolreza Ghanbari's wife and mother of two, Sakineh Habibi, is fighting his conviction and sentence and is quoted as saying:

The fate of my husband is not important to anybody, because he is not a member of any political party or organization. He is on death row and no individual, political, or cultural institution is following up on his case, and no action is being taken to stop his death sentence. Even though nobody replies to our inquiries, I have no choice but to keep my hope alive and try to save the life of my husband and loving father for the sake of my children; for the sake of my ten year old daughter. I request from everyone to not allow a cultural activist and an unknown teacher be executed for the crime of being alone and not having anyone [of influence around].

== See also ==
- Human rights in Iran
- Moharebeh
