= Mohsen Amiraslani =

Persian psychoanalyst (1977–2014)

- Born: 1977; Abadan, Iran
- Died: 24 September 2014 (aged 36–37); Karaj, Tehran, Iran
- Occupation: Psychoanalyst
- Known for: Execution for blasphemy and heresy in religion and corruption on earth

Mohsen Amiraslani Zanjani (Persian: محسن امیراصلانی زنجانی) (1977 - September 24, 2014) was an Iranian psychoanalyst, who was executed for blasphemy and insulting to prophet Jonah. He was 37 years old and had a two-year old child when he was executed.

Aslani had spent eight years in prison before being executed. His conviction was for the religious crime of "heresy because he rejected the tale of Jonah and the Whale", which did not itself carry a death sentence. Iranian authorities stated that his execution was instead related to "accusations of rape." According to attorney Hossein Raeesi, the minimal evidentiary requirements for the case were not met and the case also violated numerous violations of Iran's own code of Criminal Procedure.
