= Mahsas (disambiguation) =

Mahsas may refer to:

- Ahmed Mahsas, an Algerian militant in the nationalist movement against French colonization
- Mahsas, a village in Boumerdès Province within Algeria
- Salim Mahsas, an Algerian footballer

== See also ==
- Mahsa (disambiguation)
