= Execution of Mohsen Shekari =

Iranian man executed by the state due to Mahsa Amini protests

Mohsen Shekari
- Born: 24 February 2000
- Died: 8 December 2022 (aged 22)
- Cause of death: Execution by hanging
- Known for: First execution in Iran as a direct result of the Mahsa Amini protests
- Status: Executed
- Criminal charge: Moharebeh ("waging war against God")
- Penalty: Death

Mohsen Shekari (Persian: محسن شکاری; 24 February 2000 – 8 December 2022) was a 22-year-old Iranian man who was executed by the state of Iran after being convicted of injuring a member of Iran's Basij militia and being accused of Moharebeh, a Persian word translating to "waging war against God".

Shekari's death was the first known state-sanctioned execution to have occurred as a direct result of the 2022 Mahsa Amini protests. His execution drew immediate condemnation from human rights organizations who expressed concerns that Shekari's execution, as well as the subsequent execution of Majidreza Rahnavard four days later, would catalyze a rash of state executions of protesters.

== Reported crime ==
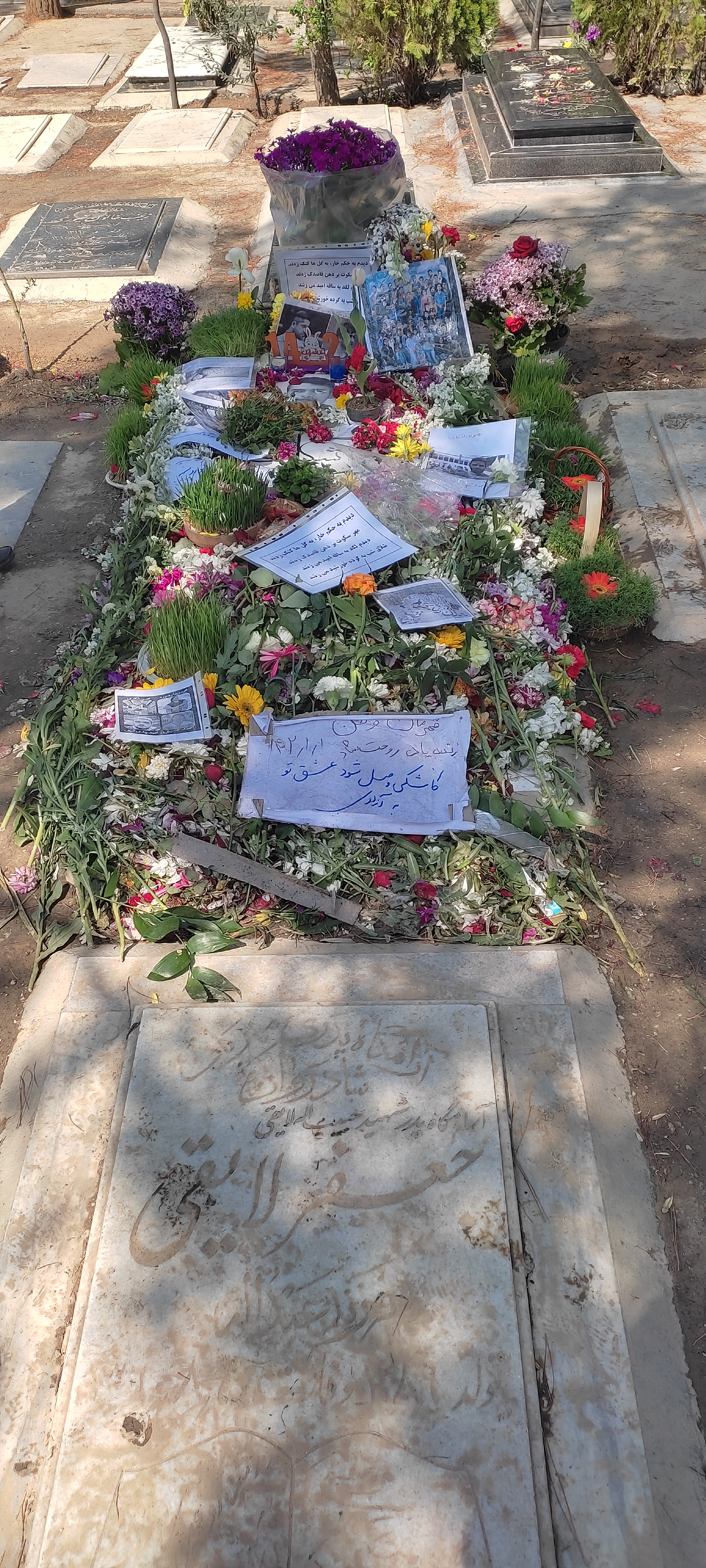
The grave of Mohsen Shekhari

On 25 September 2022, Shekari attended a protest against the death of Mahsa Amini in Tehran, Iran's capital city. During the protest, Iranian authorities asserted that he blocked or closed off a main road in Tehran, Sattar Khan Street, and wounded a member of the Basij militia, which had been sent in to quell the protests, with a machete. The militiaman required 13 stitches in his left shoulder as a result of the injury, according to the Iranian Student News Agency.

Shekari's family has disputed the Iranian authorities' version of events and claimed that Shekari used non-violent means to separate protestors and security forces. Shekari's uncle, Mahmoud Shekari, told reporters that after having witnessed security forces attacking protestors, Shekari had removed a guardrail and placed it in the middle of the street to block off the area.

The Iranian judiciary's news agency Mizan reported on Shekari's charges following the execution; he was also accused of being a "rioter". Mashregh News Agency, which is linked to the state military of Iran, published a video reportedly showing Shekari confessing, although his family doubted the validity of the confession and due to his facial injuries raised claims that he had been tortured. The video showed Shekari confessing that a friend encouraged him to attend the protests and offered him a bribe to assault a police officer.

== Legal ==
Shekari's trial took place on 1 November 2022, presided over by Judge Abolqasem Salavati. Shekari was found guilty of drawing a weapon "with the intention of killing, causing terror and disturbing the order and security of society," as well as moharebeh, or "enmity against God" under Sharia, the latter of which carries an automatic death sentence. Shekari's judge had the choice to impose a lighter sentence, including deportation, but he did not opt to do so. Shekari appealed the verdict. The Supreme Court of Iran upheld the verdict on 20 November 2022, despite the fact that Shekari was not represented by his lawyer at the time of the appeal.

== Execution ==
Shekari was executed by hanging on the morning of 8 December 2022. He was 22 years old. His family waited outside the jail awaiting updates on his fate while the execution took place. The Tasnim News Agency, which has connections with Iran's Revolutionary Guard Corps, confirmed that Shekari's execution had taken place, but did not provide any other information. While at least 459 protesters have been killed by police since the Mahsa Amini protests began in September 2022, Shekari's execution made him the first person confirmed to have been judicially executed for his alleged role in the protests.

After Shekari's execution, his uncle criticized Iranian officials for not having given his family possession of Shekari's body for burial. He accused Iranian officials of having sent the family to two separate cemeteries, neither of which contained Shekari's remains. Multiple families of other protesters killed by police during the Mahsa Amini protests have made similar complaints.

== Aftermath ==
Following the execution, Iranian state television aired portions of Shekari's detention and trial. The footage showed Shekari limping down a hallway and offered excerpts from his testimony wherein he was wielding a knife and reenacting the attack. A video was posted to TikTok by an Iranian protest monitor, which depicted a woman, reportedly Shekari's mother, crying in the street with a caption claiming her emotional reaction after his mother was told that Shekari had been executed while the family was still waiting on an appeal.

On 6 December, a spokesperson for the Iranian judiciary announced that five people reportedly involved in the killing of Rouhollah Ajamian, a member of the Basij, were sentenced to death, but could appeal their verdicts.

Amnesty International reported after Shekari's execution that a senior Iranian police commander had signed a document requesting the public execution of one prisoner connected with the protests "in the shortest time possible", specifically requesting that the execution be public "as a heart-warming gesture towards the security forces." On 12 December, four days after Shekari's execution, Iran carried out the execution of Majidreza Rahnavard in public.

== Response ==
=== Domestic ===
Several activists, lawyers, and Iranian citizens condemned the execution on social media. They claimed that Shekari was denied access to a lawyer during his interrogations and other legal proceedings leading up to his death. Many highlighted the fact that there had only been 74 days between Shekari's arrest and execution, which is an abnormally short period in comparison to similar trials. They also brought awareness that there were other detainees besides Shekari who were at imminent risk of execution.

Even Iranian clerics and legal experts that are seen close to the government, including Ayatollah Morteza Moghtadai, the former head of Iran's Supreme Court, have voiced their opposition to the use of the death penalty in connection with the enmity against God charge that was brought against him. Mohsen Borhani, an assistant professor of criminal law at University of Tehran, has strongly condemned Shekari's execution in a debate in Imam Sadiq University, a religious institution founded by the conservative politician, Mohammad-Reza Mahdavi Kani, that has been instrumental in the recruitment of hardliner politicians in the Islamic Republic.

Iranian actor Navid Mohammadzadeh made a post on Instagram reading, "Nothing washes off blood." The post tagged Shekari's name. Another Iranian actor, Taraneh Alidoosti, made an Instagram post following Shekari's execution reading, "Your silence means supporting oppression and oppressors." She added, "Every international organization who is watching this bloodshed and not taking action, is a disgrace to humanity." Many other celebrities have condemned Shakeri's execution and the government's use of sham trials and death sentences, including prominent Iranian footballer Ali Karimi, well-known actresses Golshifteh Farahani and Nazanin Boniadi, and Iranian rapper Hichkas.

Sharyar, a protester who was held in prison before being released, tweeted that he and Shekari had crossed paths during their incarceration and that "Mohsen Shekari loved life — he was waiting for his freedom." He said Shekari was a "quiet young man" who had worked at a Tehran café before deciding to join the protests, and that Shekari held hope that his death sentence would be commuted to 10 years in prison.

==== Iranian officials ====
On 5 December 2022, three days before Shekari's execution, the Islamic Revolutionary Guard Corps praised Iran's judiciary for its hardline stance against the protesters and encouraged quick and decisive judgments for defendants accused of crimes related to the protests, including "crimes against the security of the nation and Islam."

The deputy director of Chatham House's Middle East and North Africa Program, Sanam Vakil, noted that Shekari's execution sent a message to protestors that the state was "[signifying] the apogee of its toleration. Up until now, the system sees itself as having shown restraint, but this execution could be the endpoint to that." Likewise, Iran's police chief, Hossein Ashtari, stated on Thursday, "[T]he police will not show restraint in dealing with security threats."

=== Human rights advocates ===
Some human rights groups, primarily based in European countries or the US, condemned Shekari's execution immediately. Iran Human Rights director Mahmood Amiry-Moghaddam wrote after the execution that it "must be [met] with STRONG reactions," or "we will be facing daily executions of prisoners. This execution must have rapid practical consequences internationally." Amiry-Moghaddam also called Shekari's trial a "show trial without any due process" in Iran's Islamic Revolutionary Court, criticizing The Revolutionary Court's tradition of holding trials behind closed doors, not allowing accused parties to pick their own lawyers, and not allowing accused parties to review the evidence that will be used against them.

In an interview featured in the reformist newspaper Etemad, sociology professor Taghi Azadarmaki warned that the judicial system's punishment of protesters would backfire: "If the system punishes the protesters, people's behavior will become radical, and their patience will end. The news of issuing death sentences and long-term prisons is dangerous. If this trend continues, people will tend towards fundamentalist changes."

Amnesty International said they were "horrified" at the execution, saying it had only been three weeks between Shekari's "grossly unfair sham trial" and his death. Amnesty called Shekari's execution "yet another illustration of the fact that the authorities are resorting to the death penalty as a weapon of political oppression. . . . [and] to instill fear among the public," and called on Iranian officials to "stop using the death penalty as a tool of political repression against protesters in their desperate attempt to end the popular uprising."

Amnesty also reported that Iranian authorities are pursuing death sentences against at least 18 people, 12 of whom were at imminent risk of execution at the time of their report, while 6 were facing trial for crimes that carry the death penalty as the maximum sentence. Amnesty criticized the judiciary for conducting "sham trials designed to intimidate those participating in the popular uprising that has rocked Iran" and called for Iranian authorities to "immediately quash all death sentences, refrain from seeking the imposition of the death penalty and drop all charges against those arrested in connection with their peaceful participation in protests."

=== International officials ===
- United States Secretary of State Antony Blinken said America was "appalled" by Shekari's execution. "Our message to Iran's leadership is clear: End this brutal crackdown," Blinken tweeted. "We will continue to hold the Iranian regime accountable";
- Foreign Minister of Germany Annalena Baerbock tweeted that Shekari "was tried and executed in a perfidious rushed trial for disagreeing with the regime. The Iranian regime's contempt for humanity is limitless. But the threat of execution will not stifle people's will for freedom";
- Foreign Secretary of the United Kingdom James Cleverly said he was "outraged by the tragic news of the first execution of a protester in Iran."
- The Czech Republic's Ministry of Foreign Affairs, which currently holds the rotating presidency of the European Union, called the execution "appalling" and criticized the Iranian government for using "outrageously disproportionate penalties to instill terror in its population";
- Anne-Claire Legendre, the spokeswoman for the Ministry for Europe and Foreign Affairs based in France, announced that France condemned the execution in the "strongest terms" and "reiterated its strong commitment to the right to peaceful protest." They also called the execution "yet another instance of the serious, unacceptable violations of fundamental rights and freedoms committed by the Iranian authorities";
- Prime Minister of Italy Giorgia Meloni condemned the execution and declared that Italy was "outraged" at the action. Italian Foreign Minister Antonio Tajani stated that Iran had "passed the point of no return";
- The European Union said it "condemns his execution in the strongest possible terms". An Italian vice president at the European Parliament, Pina Picierno, called Shekari's execution "the first insane death sentence carried out on a protester in Iran." She defended the Iranian protesters, saying, "You will find us on the side of freedom, on the side of the protesters. Always."

== See also ==
- Capital punishment in Iran
- Political repression in the Islamic Republic of Iran
- Death of Mahsa Amini
- Death sentences during the Mahsa Amini protests
- Execution of Majidreza Rahnavard, the second person executed for involvement in the Mahsa Amini protests
- Mohammad Boroughani
- Amir Reza Nasr Azadani
- Public executions in Iran
- Timeline of the Mahsa Amini protests
