= Mahsa Amrabadi =

Iranian journalist

- Born: 3 July 1984 (age 41); Tehran, Tehran
- Spouse: Masoud Bastani

Mahsa Amrabadi (Persian: مهسا امرآبادی; born July 3, 1984, in Rasht, Gilan) is an Iranian journalist.

Amrabadi, along with her husband and reformist journalist Masoud Bastani, was arrested after the disputed presidential election of June 2009. She was sentenced to 2 years in prison. She was released from prison in 2013.

== See also ==
- Human rights in Iran
