= Mahsa Abdolzadeh =

Austrian politician, women's rights and LGBT activist

- Born: 22 September 1985 (age 41); Tabriz, Iran
- Education: University of Vienna
- Occupations: Politician, Activist, Author
- Political party: Green Party

Mahsa Abdolzadeh (Persian: مهسا عبداله زاده; born 22 September 1985) is an Austrian politician for the Green Party in Vienna and a political scientist. She is a feminist and an activist for women, LGBTQ, and minority rights.

== Early life and career ==
Abdolzadeh was born during the Iran-Iraq War in Tabriz, Iran, and grew up in both Tehran and Vienna. She later moved to live solely in Vienna, in 2004. She has earned a master's degree in political science from the University of Vienna in 2013 whilst studying child social work in a private college in Vienna.

After completing her studies, she published a book depicting women movements in Iran. This text has been one of the most notable works in German academia concerning women's rights in Iran. In 2017, Abdolzadeh opened the first gender-neutral and religion-neutral kindergarten in Austria, based on her concept from her doctoral thesis. Like many other pioneers of alternative education, she faced massive attacks between 2022 and 2023 from right-wing politicians in Austria, who accused her of misusing funding. It wasn't until the summer of 2023 that the Vienna Public Prosecutor's Office proved her innocence and dropped the charges. Currently, investigations are ongoing against those who sought to discredit Abdolzadeh's forward-thinking ideas. She has published numerous articles in the German and Persian languages, primarily about feminism in Europe and the Middle East, European immigration politics, and the negative effects of fundamentalist Islamic education among the Jihad.

She initially started her work in sales management, later becoming a social worker. After her studies, she became a women's adviser for the Green Party in Vienna. As of 2015, she is an elected politician for the Green Party in the 19th district of Vienna.

== Publications ==
- (2014) German: Demokratieversuche der Frauenbewegung im Iran: Eine historische Analyse mit Beispielen aus dem 20. Jahrhundert (Hamburg Kovac)
