= Mahsa Shahbazian =

Iranian musician, composer and Qanun player

Mahsa Shahbazian (born 1984 in Tehran) is an Iranian musician, composer and Qanun player.

She played in many albums and worked with some musicians like Alireza Mashayekhi, Rastak Ensemble and Mojtaba Asgari. Shahbazian was one of those Iranian musicians who signed a letter of protest to the Ministry of Culture and Islamic Guidance about concerts cancellations in Iran.
