= Hirabah =

Arabic term for highway robbery and piracy

In Islamic law, ḥirabah (Arabic: حرابة) is a legal category that comprises highway robbery (traditionally understood as aggravated robbery or grand larceny, unlike theft, which has a different punishment), rape, and terrorism. Ḥirābah means piracy or unlawful warfare. It comes from the triliteral root ḥrb, which means “to become angry and enraged”. The noun ḥarb (حَرْب, pl. ḥurūb حُروب) means 'war' or 'wars'.

Moharebeh (Persian: محاربه, also spelled muharebeh) is a Persian language term that is treated as interchangeable with ḥirabah in Arabic lexicons. The related term muḥārib (Arabic: محارب, lit. 'perpetrator of muḥāribah') has been translated by English-language Iranian media as "enemy of God". In English-language media sources, moḥarebeh in Iran has been translated variously as "waging war against God," "war against God and the state," "enmity against God."

It is a capital crime in Saudi Arabia and Iran.

== Scriptural basis ==
A verse from the Quran, surah al-Ma'idah 5:33, is known as "the ḥirāba verse" (āyat al-ḥirāba), specifies punishment for "those who wage war against God and His Messenger and strive to spread disorder in the land":

The punishment of those who wage war against God and His Messenger, and strive with might and main for mischief through the land is: execution, or crucifixion, or the cutting off of hands and feet from opposite sides, or exile from the land: that is their disgrace in this world, and a heavy punishment is theirs in the Hereafter; ^{[Quran 5:33]}

Although the verse gives punishments for waging war against God and His Messenger, it does not include the word ḥirābah, nor its meaning, nor the crime's "constituent elements, modes of crime and conditions".

The verbal noun form (i.e. ḥirāba) is frequently used in classical and modern books of Islamic jurisprudence, but neither the word ḥirāba nor the root verb ḥaraba occurs in the Quran. (Yuḥāribūna is the form used in Quran 5:33-4.)

According to early Islamic sources, the verse was revealed after the expedition of Kurz bin Jabir Al-Fihri: some members of the Arabian tribe of the Banu Urayna feigned conversion to Islam to steal Muslims' possessions and killed a young shepherd sent to teach them about the faith. Given the broad and strong language of the verse, however, various state representatives beginning with the Umayyad Caliphate have asserted that it applied to rebels in general.

The original meanings of the triliteral root ḥrb are to despoil someones wealth or property, and also fighting or committing sinful act. The Quran "refers to both meanings" in al-Baqara 2:279 and Al-Ma'ida 5:33-34.

== Crime ==
According to Islamic scholar Khaled Abou El Fadl, ḥirāba means "waging war against society" and in Islamic jurisprudence traditionally referred to acts such as killing noncombatants ("the resident and wayfarer"), "assassinations, setting fires, or poisoning water wells," crimes "so serious and repugnant" that their perpetrators were "not to be given quarter or sanctuary anywhere."

Another source (Brian Murphy) states, "many Islamic scholars interpret the references to acts that defy universal codes such as intentionally killing civilians during warfare or causing random destruction." According to the author Sadakat Kadri, "Most classical jurists" had established "a thousand or so years ago" that ḥirāba "referred specifically to banditry in open country: a uniquely destabilizing threat to civil order in a premodern society."

The crime is sometimes lumped together with fasād fil-ʾarḍ "spreading corruption in the land", which is mentioned alongside waging "war against Allah and His Prophet" in 5:33-34.

=== Rape ===
The inclusion of rape within the purview of ḥirāba has had support throughout history. The medieval Zahiri jurist ibn Hazm defined ḥirāba:

One who puts people in fear on the road, whether or not with a weapon, at night or day, in urban areas or in open spaces, in the palace of a caliph or a mosque, with or without accomplices, in the desert or in the village, in a large or small city, with one or more people… making people fear that they’ll be killed, or have money taken, or be raped (hatk al ‘arad)… whether the attackers are one or many.'

It had significant support from the Maliki school.

Al-Dasuqi, for example, a Maliki jurist, held that if a person forced a woman to have sex, his actions would be deemed committing hiraba.

In addition, the Maliki judge Ibn 'Arabi, relates a story in which a group was attacked and a woman in their party raped. Responding to the argument that the crime did not constitute hiraba because no money was taken and no weapons used, Ibn 'Arabi replied indignantly that "hirabah with the private parts" is much worse than hiraba involving the taking of money, and that anyone would rather be subjected to the latter than the former.

In the Hanafi school, the term zina is taken to refer to illegal sexual intercourse, where rape is distinguished as zina bil-jabr to indicate its forced and non-consensual nature, whereas fornication and adultery fit zina bil-ridha, which indicates consent. Though the terminology uses the term zina, nonetheless, they are two categorically different crimes as rape is treated as a hirāba crime by the judge and prosecuted based on circumstantial evidence (medical evidence, any number of witnesses, and other forensic evidence). In other words, very similar to how it is treated in contemporary Western law. It is fornication and adultery by mutual consent, or zina bil-ridha, which retain their classical hadd punishments from the Qur'an and sunnah, provided there are four witnesses (absent which they too default to tazir, subject to discretionary punishments such as fining, imprisonment, or lashes). Nonetheless, gang rape or public rape, such as the sort that occurs during war, is still traditionally considered ḥirāba as that is more in line with its classical definition as a war crime or crime against civilization and society.

== Punishment ==
In keeping with the Quranic verse 5:33 quoted above, "most classical [Islamic] jurists" held that the penalty for muḥāribah was crucifixion (تصليب), cross-amputation (amputation of right hand and left foot) or being banished from the land. (نفى).

According to Sadakat Kadri the crimes of waging `war against God and His apostle` (Muḥāribah) and spreading `disorder in the land` (fasad fi-l-ard) were originally punished either by exile or some combination of double amputation, beheading, and crucifixion (what Kadri calls "Islam's equivalent of the hanging, drawing and quartering that medieval Europeans inflicted on traitors"). This was the only capital penalty permitted rulers by the Quran (in the case of murder the killer's fate was in the hands of the victim's next of kin not the judge) during the early years of Islam "when enemies of the faith and political rebels often looked frighteningly similar" the crime had broader application including apostasy from Islam but was "gradually narrowed" to apply only to "highway robbery in the open county."

The choice of crucifixion and its method is subject to "complex and contested rules" in classical jurisprudence. Most scholars required crucifixion for highway robbery combined with murder, while others allowed execution by other methods. The main methods of crucifixion are:

- Exposure of the culprit's body after execution by another method, ascribed to "most scholars" and in particular to Ibn Hanbal and Al-Shafi'i; or Hanbalis and Shafi'is.
- Crucifying the culprit alive, then executing him with a lance thrust or another method, ascribed to Malikis, most Hanafis and most Twelver Shi'is; the majority of the Malikis; Malik, Abu Hanifa, and al-Awza'i; or Malikis, Hanafis, and Shafi'is.
- Crucifying the culprit alive and sparing his life if he survives for three days, ascribed to Shiites.

Most scholars limit the period of crucifixion to three days.

== In current legal systems ==
=== Iran ===
In Iran, hirabah is known as moharebeh and is translated variously in English-language media as "waging war against God," "war against God and the state," or "enmity against God." The charge is levied against people who commit acts against the government. Another related crime is Mofsede-fel-arz, which is "spreading corruption on the earth", which can be applied for political crimes such as treason. Iran's judiciary system has also used another related crime, baghi, which is translated to "armed rebellion against the Islamic government", especially against protesters during the 2022 Mahsa Amini protests.

In 2022, dozens were charged with moharabeh for their involvement in the Mahsa Amini protests, and at least four people have been executed. Human rights organizations have condemned the use of "sham trials designed to intimidate protestors" and the "chilling use of the death penalty in rushed trials."

The term is widely used by Iran's Islamic Judiciary, citing Sharia law, and is "usually used against those who take up arms against the state," and usually carries the death penalty. The term is used in articles 183 to 196 of Iran's criminal law. The cases that fall under this term typically require involvement in armed criminal activities, e.g: taking up arms for terrorism and disruption of public safety (article 183), membership in groups conducting armed uprising (article 186), supporting groups planning to overthrow the government by force using weapons and explosives (article 187), accepting critical posts in a Coup d'etat government. Articles 190-191 state that a judge can give a person convicted under one of these crimes capital punishment. Peaceful and unarmed opposition to government does not fall under this term. Typical convicts under the term are members of armed ethnic separatist groups, members of armed drug trafficking groups, and people involved in armed robbery.

According to Human Rights Watch, "at least nine people" convicted of moharebeh by Islamic Revolutionary Courts for "their alleged ties to armed opposition groups" were executed in 2014.

Between the end of early days of the 1979 Islamic Revolution, when scores of former officials of the Shah and others were arrested and executed for moharebeh, and the beginning of the 2009 election protests, executions for moharebeh were rare, and usually applied against members of armed opposition/terrorist groups, Kurdish separatists, or common criminals.

In recent years, Iranians executed after being charged with Moharebeh include Majidreza Rahnavard (2022), Mohsen Shekari (2022), Mohammad-Reza Ali-Zamani (2010), Arash Rahmanipour (2010), and Ehsan Fatahian (2009). Others accused, charged or convicted of Moharebeh include Adnan Hassanpour, whose death sentence for Moharebeh was overturned in 2008 on appeal, and Zeynab Jalalian, whose death sentence was commuted to life in prison. Shia cleric Hossein Kazemeyni Boroujerdi, known for preaching that religion is separate from politics, was reportedly charged with Moharebeh in 2007 by Iran's Special Court for the Clergy, but had his sentence reduced to 11 years in prison after an appeal.

Student demonstrator Mohammad Amin Valian was sentenced to death for Moharebeh in 2009, a sentence overturned by an appeals court in March 2010. In March 2010, the 76-year-old former dean of Tehran University, Mohammad Maleki, was charged with it for alleged "contact with unspecified foreign groups and working to undermine the Islamic system." He was later convicted of lesser charges. Abdolreza Ghanbari, a university lecturer living in Pakdasht, was arrested in the wake of 2009 Ashura protests and convicted in 2010 of “Moharebeh through ties with hostile groups [against] the regime”. A request for pardon of the death sentence was rejected on 28 February 2012.

In a February 2011 televised address before a group of clerics in the city of Qom, hard-liner cleric Ahmad Khatami accused reformist presidential candidates Mir Hossein Mousavi and Mahdi Karroubi of Moharebeh as "leaders of sedition." This was not followed up with any charges against the two by the Iranian judiciary.

Abdolfattah Soltani, an Iranian attorney and member of Center for Defense of Human Rights has argued that under Articles 86 and 89 of the Islamic Punitive Laws of the Islamic Republic of Iran, the accused must "either have engaged in armed confrontation or he must have been a supporter or a member of an armed group and must have committed effective [deliberate] actions on behalf of that organization.", conditions that have not been met by defendants such as Valian, who threw stones at militia members.

According to journalist Brian Murphy, the Iranian Islamic regime's use of moharebeh against 2009 election protesters has "opened deep rifts between ruling clerics and Islamic scholars questioning how an idea about safeguarding Muslims can be transformed into a tool to punish political protesters." Ayatollah Mostafa Mohaghegh Damad has reportedly sought to "rally clerics to oppose the use of moharebeh charges against political protesters."

In 2019, an Iranian Quran interpreter has called for the punishment of those protesting, based on Quran Surah 5:33.

In December 2022, Iranian football player Amir Reza Nasr Azadani was reported to be facing possible execution, the world footballers' union expresses 'shock' and 'sadness'. Nasr-Azadani was accused of being a member of an "armed group" involved in the killing of three security officers during protests in the central Iranian city of Esfahan, the city's Chief Justice Asadullah Jafari said, as reported by the state agency IRNA.

In the report, Jafari said Nasr-Azadani had been charged with baghi, or rioting against the authorities, and has been in custody since November 27, but no sentence has yet been issued.

By late 2022, at least 43 Iranians had been sentenced to death for moharebeh or mofsed-e-filarz due to their purported involvement in the Mahsa Amini protests. The first of their executions occurred on 8 December, when Mohsen Shekari was hanged after being convicted of moharebeh due to allegations that he nonfatally injured a Basij militiaman. Four days later, Majidreza Rahnavard was publicly executed after being convicted of moharebeh due to allegations that he was involved in two murders of two "volunteer" Basij militiamen during a protest. On 7 January 2023, Iran executed Mohammad Mehdi Karami and Seyyed Mohammad Hosseini after they were convicted of mofsed-e-filarz, in connection to their alleged involvement in the protests. Amnesty International accused Iran of extracting false confessions from those condemned to death for moharebeh or mofsed-e-filarz in connection with the protests, subjecting them to torture, and depriving them of their right to a fair trial.

=== Nigeria ===
The penalty for hirabah in Nigeria is death if a life is taken during the offense. Additionally, the Zamfara penal code provides that if life and property are taken during the commission of hirabah, the penalty is crucifixion.

=== Saudi Arabia ===
In Saudi Arabia, Hirabah is defined as "Armed Robbery". To prove hirabah, two witnesses must testify or there must be a confession. In addition, an offender can still escape the death penalty if he "repents before he is arrested and willingly places himself in the hands of the authorities."

== See also ==
- Fasad
- Jihad
- Judicial system of Iran
- Mofsed-e-filarz
- Muslim attitudes towards terrorism

== Sources ==
- Amin, ElSayed (2014). Reclaiming Jihad: A Qur'anic Critique of Terrorism. Kube Publishing. ISBN 9780860375982.
- Kadri, Sadakat (2012). Heaven on Earth: A Journey Through Shari'a Law from the Deserts of Ancient Arabia ... Macmillan. ISBN 9780099523277.
- PEIFFER, ELIZABETH (2005). "THE DEATH PENALTY IN TRADITIONAL ISLAMIC LAW AND AS INTERPRETED IN SAUDI ARABIA AND NIGERIA". William & Mary Journal of Women and the Law. 11 (3): 507–539.
