= Mofsed-e-filarz =

Capital crime in Iran

Mofsed-e-filarz (Persian: مفسد فی الارض, Arabic: المفسد في الأرض Al-Mufsid fi al-Arḍ, also Mofsed fel-arz, Afsad-i fil Arz, fasad-fel-arz, or fasad fi 'l-ard; lit. 'Corruption on the Earth ') is the title of capital crimes, or the person guilty of them, in Iran, which has been translated in English-language sources variously as "spreading corruption on Earth", "spreading corruption that threatens social and political well-being", "corrupt of the Earth; one who is charged with spreading corruption", "gross offenders of the moral order", and "enemies of God on Earth".

== Quran, Shariah ==
In classical sharia law and a Quranic context fasad fi 'l-ard has been described as the "antithesis" of the "political prosperity" that is "God's order for mankind".

According to scholar John Esposito, the term is used in the Quran to refer to “corrupt conditions, caused by unbelievers and unjust people, that threaten social and political well-being". It is found in Quran, in which Allah narrates:

They said, "O Zul-Qarnain, Gog and Magog are corruptors of the Earth. Can we pay you to create a barrier between us and them?"^{[Quran 18:94]}

And also Quran 2:27 and Quran 13:25.

The crime is similar to and sometimes lumped together with "moharebeh" (civil unrest/waging war on God and people), and people have been charged with both crimes.

== Iran ==
The NYTimes describes the charge, as enforced by Iran, "a catchall indictment of political dissent." It carries the death sentence.

According to at least one source, Mofsed-e-filarz was first introduced as a crime in Iran by Ayatollah Khomeini. It was used by Islamic Republican judicial authorities in the early days of the Iranian Revolution, resulting in many imprisonments and executions. Possibly more than 8,000 people suffered that fate, ranging from former members of the Shah's government, leaders of opposition or terrorist groups, or simply opponents of the regime. It was used against leaders of the Baháʼí Faith on a number of occasions, and in February 2011 a large majority of members of the Iranian parliament called for the prosecution and execution of Iranian opposition leaders Mehdi Karroubi and Mir-Hossein Mousavi on the charge of mofsed-e-filarz.

=== Criminal Code ===
The Criminal Codes of the Islamic Republic of Iran (IRI) that include Mofsed-e-filarz were adopted in 1996 by the Islamic Consultative Assembly; some changes were made in 2012. Muhareb and Mufsid-i fil Arz are defined as persons drawing weapons with intent to threaten or cause fear and security risk in society in Article 190 of the Codes. Article 284 of the Codes is dedicated to Baghi [armed rebellion], and Afsad-i fil Arz, and was revised with a broadening of who may be punished by execution. Article 284 states that those subject to execution include, “Whosoever engages extensively in:

- commission of widespread crime against masses;
- crimes against homeland or external security;
- spreading rumors and/or uttering slander;
- financial malfeasance in the affairs of the State;
- spreading hazardous and poisonous substances;
- establishing brothels or involvement in their operation, causing extensive disturbance in public order;
- causing security risks or inflicting substantial physical harm to individuals or damage to public or private properties;
- widespread moral corruption and offenses".

== See also ==
- Moharebeh
- Judicial system of Iran
- Ruhollah Zam
