= Iran internal crisis (2025–present) =

Political crisis in Iran

- Date: 13 June 2025 – present (1 year, 5 months and 4 days)
- Location: Iran

Following the 2025 Twelve-Day War, a domestic crisis began in Iran. The period is characterized by domestic unrest, political instability, protests (including their suppression) and economic decline within the country, to which the government of Iran responded with government crackdowns, mass executions, arrests and militarization in an effort to maintain control.

As a result of the Twelve-Day War, internal tension within the Islamic Republic worsened. Various reports highlighted the government's weaknesses in security and management ability, and has chosen to engage in internal disputes rather than promote unity or initiate reforms to avoid accountability. Amnesty International's Karg observes that, in response to growing international isolation, the government is tightening domestic control through intensified repression and likely a rise in executions. In addition, the war's aftermath has pushed Iran's already struggling economy into an even more unstable and vulnerable state.

In late 2025, mass protests erupted across Iran, driven by public anger over the deepening economic crisis. Initially led by bazaar merchants and shopkeepers in Tehran, the demonstrations quickly expanded beyond economic demands to include chants of anti-government slogans such as "Death to the Dictator".

== Background ==
On 13 June 2025, the Twelve-Day War broke out when Israeli forces launched attacks targeting Iranian military, nuclear and government sites, along with assassinations of IRGC leadership. Iran retaliated with extensive missile and drone barrages against Israeli and allied targets, including a strike on a US base in Qatar. The war ended with a US and Qatar-brokered ceasefire on 24 June.

=== Economic instability ===
In the aftermath of the Twelve-Day War, Iran's internal economy has entered a phase of heightened instability and fragility. The conflict delivered a sudden shock to a system already weakened by years of sanctions, mismanagement, and infrastructural decay. The displacement of nearly seven million people from urban centers during the war disrupted commerce, transportation, and local economies. Though many residents have returned, the economic rhythm has not fully recovered, and business continuity remains strained in key sectors.

Post-war, Iran faces the dual challenge of physical and institutional recovery. Power shortages, already critical before the conflict, have worsened significantly. Industrial zones now experience unscheduled and prolonged blackouts of up to five hours daily, severely undermining manufacturing output and supply chains. Compounded by logistical breakdowns and reduced fuel availability, basic services are under pressure, and small businesses face renewed uncertainty. If the Israeli strikes damaged refining capacity or disrupted distribution channels for industrial inputs, the recovery trajectory will be even more arduous.

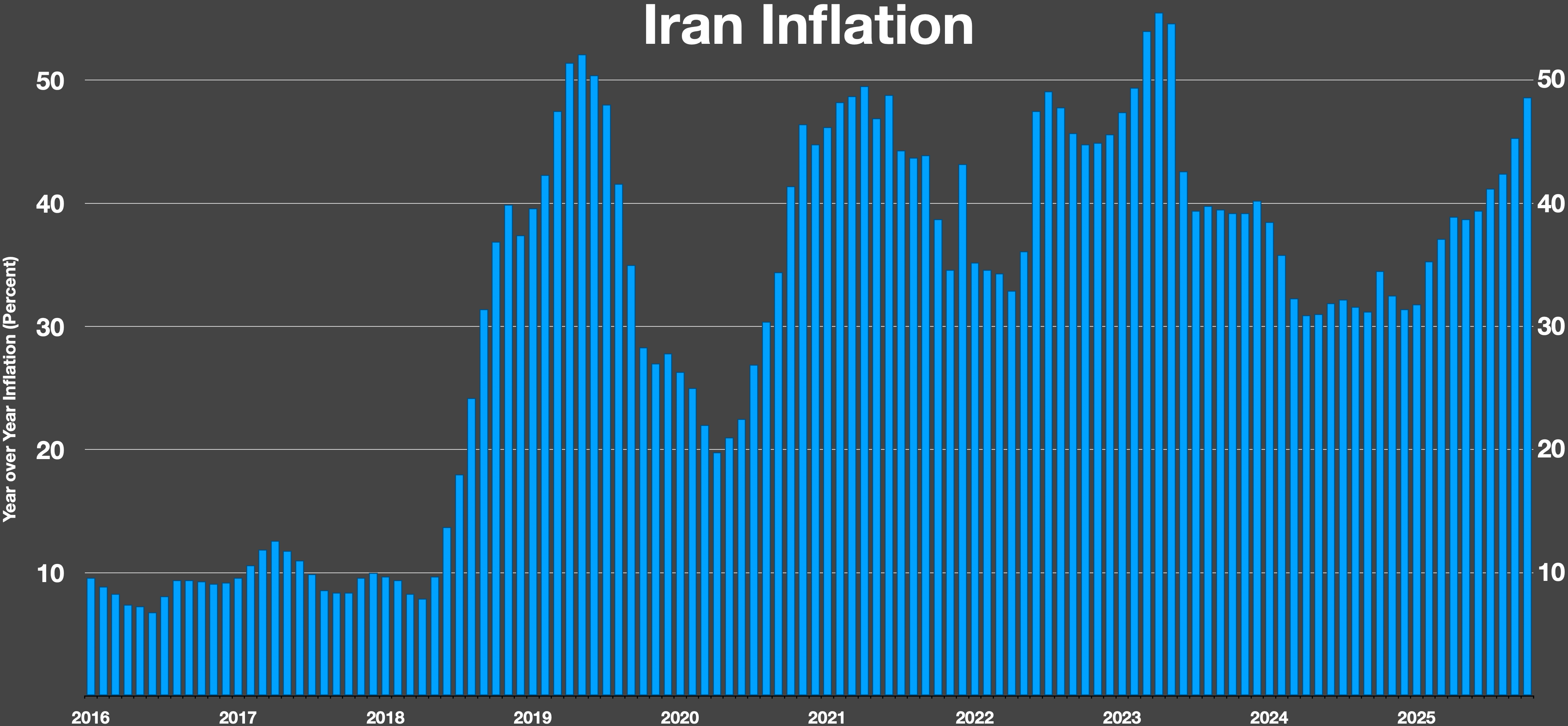
Iran inflation

The post-war economic outlook is further complicated by Iran's political response to the strikes. The government's move to suspend cooperation with the International Atomic Energy Agency signals a confrontational stance that risks triggering new European sanctions under the nuclear agreement's enforcement mechanisms. This has alarmed many inside Iran who fear deepening isolation and economic suffocation. Sanctions could tighten access to foreign currency, limit imports of essential goods, and further erode public purchasing power, outcomes that would disproportionately affect ordinary Iranians already burdened by inflation and unemployment.

== Domestic dissent ==
=== During Twelve-Day War ===
Following the initial strikes on 13 June, Iranian opposition leader Reza Pahlavi told Iranians that the time has come to "overthrow the Islamic Republic through street protests and nationwide strikes". Speaking of the government of Iran, he claimed that "it could fall. As I have told my compatriots: Iran is yours and yours to reclaim. I am with you. Stay strong and we will win. ... I have told the military, police, and security forces: break from the regime. Honor the oath of any honorable serviceman. Join the people."

On 17 June, hackers reportedly hijacked the Iranian state broadcaster during a live broadcast, and broadcast messages critical of the government and footage from anti-government protests. The footage was mostly from the Mahsa Amini protests in 2022, and included the message "Rise up! This is your moment. Go out into the streets. Take control of your future."

On 20 June 2025, Maryam Rajavi, president-elect of the National Council of Resistance of Iran, spoke at a rally in Berlin: "No to appeasement and saving the mullahs’ regime, and no to war. There is a Third Option: regime change by the people of Iran and the Iranian resistance. Democratic change is the will of the Iranian people and the verdict of history.” Her guiding principle is "No to the Shah and no to the Mullahs".

On 23 June, two days after American strikes on Iranian nuclear sites, Reza Pahlavi self-declared himself a "servant of the people", held a bilingual press conference which detailed a plan for democratic transition. He announced that he was convening a summit of social, political, and business leaders ideologically diverse perspectives who can agree on the three principles:

1. Ensuring Iran's territorial integrity,
2. Equal opportunity for all,
3. Separation of religion and State.

He called on Ali Khamenei to step down with a promise of a fair trial, and also called on members of the Iranian security apparatus to abandon the Islamic Republic and initiate regime change.

=== Post-ceasefire ===
Following the end of the conflict, there were intensifying demands domestically for economic and political change. This reformist push comes amid a deepening internal crisis in Iran, marked by public disillusionment, years of sanctions, mismanagement, and isolation have strained the economy, while widespread corruption and lack of accountability have eroded trust in the ruling system. Reformists see this moment as critical: either the Islamic Republic opens up politically and economically, or it risks further instability and collapse. The recent war with Israel, exposed the vulnerability of Iran's security and diplomatic isolation.

On 2 July, former president Hassan Rouhani publicly described the crisis, including the June 24 ceasefire, as a unique opportunity to "rebuild the foundations of governance". Rouhani stressed that national security requires not just military deterrence but also a "resilient economy, wise diplomacy, and mutual trust between state and society".

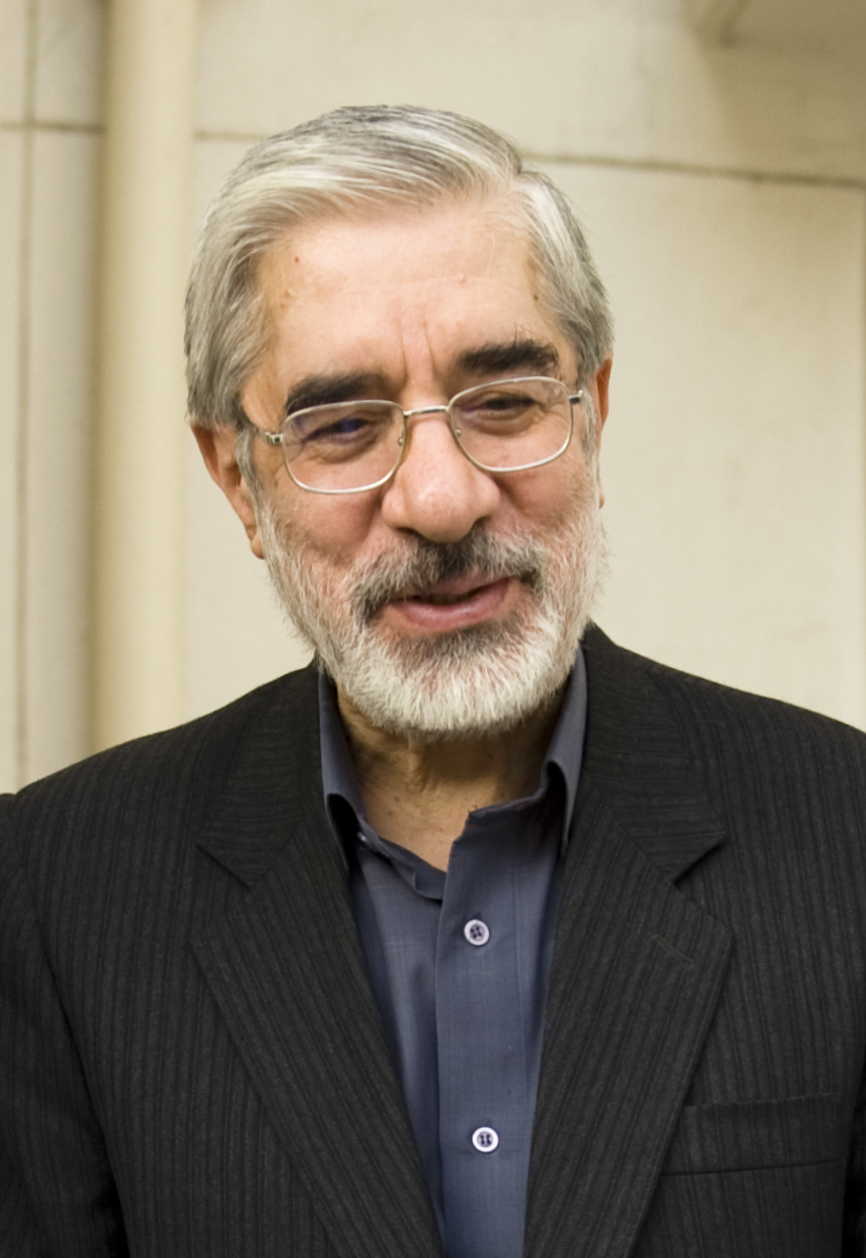
Mir Hossein Mousavi, an Iranian reformist and leader of the Iranian Green Movement in 2009

On 11 July, Mir-Hossein Mousavi, reformist leader who led the Iranian Green Movement in 2009, renewed his call for a referendum to establish a constitutional assembly, framing it as the only path to "save" Iran. He emphasized the war was born from grave political missteps and warned that public unity should not be mistaken for endorsement of the existing government.

Around 200 economists and former officials have publicly called for a "shift in the paradigm of governance", urging diplomacy with the U.S. and Europe, financial restructuring, and stronger anti-corruption measures. However, the conservative power structure, particularly the Islamic Revolutionary Guard Corps, shows no sign of yielding ground, and key reformist voices continue to face repression, including extended prison sentences for political dissidents. Activists and protesters claim they have remained quiet, fearful and confused by the war, expressing anger at both Iran and Israel.

=== Role of Israeli leadership ===
On 13 June 2025, the day the Twelve-Day War broke out, Israeli Prime Minister Benjamin Netanyahu addressed the people of Iran: "The time has come for you to unite around your flag and your historic legacy by standing up for your freedom from an evil and oppressive regime" and that "this is your opportunity to stand up and let your voices be heard".

The Israeli Defense Forces Farsi language spokesperson claimed to have received messages from Iranians, including from individuals identifying themselves as members of Iranian security institutions. According to the spokesperson, these messages expressed opposition to the Iranian government. The spokesperson directed those seeking to contact Israel to use an external VPN and visit the Mossad's website. The same day, IDF announced that it had struck several military targets in Iran. They include the IRGC's Thar-Allah Headquarters, its Sayyid al-Shuhada Corps, the headquarters of the information security unit of Iran's internal security forces, the Basij headquarters, missile production and storage sites, and radars. Hundreds of IRGC fighters were killed in the attacks, according to an Israeli official. Other strikes hit the entrance of Evin Prison and the Palestine Square Countdown Clock, which had marked the Iranian government's countdown to the destruction of Israel and the "liberation of Palestine from the Zionists".

=== 2025–2026 protests ===
In late 2025, mass protests erupted across Iran, driven by public anger over the deepening economic crisis. Initially led by bazaar merchants and shopkeepers in Tehran, the demonstrations quickly spread to universities and major cities such as Isfahan, Shiraz, and Mashhad, becoming the largest unrest since the 2022 Mahsa Amini protests. Security forces responded with measures such as tear gas. Over time, the movement expanded beyond economic demands to include calls for freedom and, in some cases, the overthrow of the Islamic Republic. Protesters chanted anti-government slogans such as "Death to the Dictator".

== Shutdown attack drills ==
In 2026 October 18 Islamic regime odered Sari to be shutdown for exercise of militia Janfida amidst national diesel fuel shortage.

== The six committee ==
In September 2026 in his interview Pezeshkian revealed a new secretive unannounced council of six persons run the entire decision making in the country. Unofficially its membership reportedly includes since the 2026 war

Minister of Foreign	Abas Aaraghchi	President	Masoud Pezeshkian
Islamic Cunsultative assembly chief	MohammadBagher Ghalibaf	Chief of SNSC	Mohsen Rezaei
IRGC commander in chief	Ahmad Vahidi	Joint chairman of joint Chiefs of armed forces staff	Ali Abdollahi

== Government response ==
Following the Twelve-Day War ceasefire in June 2025, the Iranian government began a broad campaign of internal repression. These measures, encompassing mass arrests, forced deportations, accelerated executions, expanded surveillance, and intensified restrictions on civilians, have been labeled by news outlets such as France 24, The Wall Street Journal and more, as indicative of heightened government paranoia and a perceived threat of domestic unrest or infiltration.

Despite the short duration of the war, the psychological and political impact on Iran was substantial, media using words such as "paranoia" and "unrest", highlighting the crisis. The Iranian government's limited ability to prevent or retaliate against the precision strikes, despite its claims of regional deterrence, shattered public confidence in its security doctrine. The war exacerbated existing socio-economic pressures and ignited widespread public anger, laying the foundation for the domestic crisis.

As Iran lost influence abroad and its regional proxies, including Hamas and Hezbollah, were weakened, the government tightened control domestically. Amnesty International's Karg said that, facing isolation, Tehran is reinforcing its grip at home through increased repression and likely more executions under vague foreign collaboration laws. Information access is limited due to internet blackouts, but there are growing fears for political prisoners. Political scientist Mirzaei said that hope in Western intervention has faded, making internal resistance even harder. Both experts stress that while outside pressure such as economic sanctions and diplomatic negotiation, can influence human rights, real change must come from within Iran.

Mahmood Amiry-Moghaddam, director of the Norway-based Iran Human Rights Organization, said in late June 2025 that the Islamic Republic is likely to ramp up repression in the wake of the ceasefire with Israel in order to "cover up military failures, prevent protests, and ensure its continued survival." Meanwhile, Iranian officials defended the government's approach. Esmail Baghaei, spokesperson for the Foreign Ministry, told Al Jazeera English, "Our people showed that they are resolute in their defense of national security and sovereignty."

=== Financial control ===
In September Islamic regime banned buying and selling Tether as well as banning banks loaning out money in Gold purchases . It unbanned import of Samsung and LG products amidst soaring prices, it also banned trading and buying and selling bank loans. In poll by Amarfact more than 85% of Iranians said they would be possibly leaving the country.

=== Crackdowns and arrests ===
In the days following the ceasefire, Iranian authorities shifted focus to intensifying internal security. Widespread arrests, executions, and military deployments were reported. By late June, more than 700 individuals had reportedly been arrested across various provinces, with particular focus on Tehran, Kurdish-majority areas, and other border regions. The arrestees were accused of espionage, collaboration with foreign intelligence services, or other national security offenses. Among those detained were political activists, minority community members, dual nationals, and individuals with no prior record of political dissent. In several cases, defendants were denied legal representation, tried in closed proceedings, and subjected to expedited sentencing, including capital punishment.

These actions have been framed by Iranian authorities as preemptive security measures in response to possible infiltration by Israeli intelligence agencies during the conflict. International human rights organizations have criticized the operations as violations of due process and indicative of repressive state behavior under crisis conditions. Nooshin, a 44-year-old housewife from Tehran, said the government had already begun its usual pattern of crackdowns in response to pressure, "Basically, after every crisis, the Iranian regime has a habit of punishing its own people, and this time, it will probably get many dissidents into trouble".

The Iranian parliament has concurrently proposed legislation to mandate capital punishment for all individuals convicted of espionage, effectively removing judicial discretion and codifying severe punitive measures into law. Legal experts and human rights monitors have expressed concern that such legislation would further curtail civil liberties and judicial independence, enabling the regime to suppress political opposition under the guise of national security enforcement.

=== Deportation of Afghan nationals ===
In parallel with arrests, the Iranian government significantly increased the rate of deportation of Afghan nationals residing in the country. Prior to the war, deportations averaged approximately 5,000 per day. This figure rose to as high as 30,000 daily deportations by early July 2025.

According to United Nations and humanitarian reports, over 1.1 million Afghans were forcibly returned between March and early July. Many of those deported had resided in Iran for extended periods and were expelled without legal recourse or adequate warning. The official justification for these expulsions cited national security concerns, espionage, with allegations that Afghan migrants could be used as vectors for foreign infiltration.

The mass deportations have created a humanitarian crisis along Iran's eastern borders, particularly around Herat in Afghanistan, where thousands of returnees have faced severe shortages of shelter, water, and medical aid.

=== Increased security presence ===
Increased security measures have included the proliferation of checkpoints in urban and rural areas, particularly in provinces with high levels of ethnic and political dissent. These checkpoints have been used to stop and search vehicles, inspect mobile phones, and question civilians without warrants. Simultaneously, the IRGC and Basij militia units have expanded their operations, especially in Kurdish, Baluchi, and Arab-majority regions. These forces have reportedly conducted warrantless raids, home searches, and mass detentions. The heightened paramilitary presence is viewed by analysts as a preventative measure aimed at deterring unrest and reinforcing government control in regions considered politically volatile.

The recent fatal shootings in the city of Khomein mark a growing series of violent encounters at checkpoints operated by Iran's IRGC and its affiliated Basij paramilitary units. On July 2, Fars News Agency, which is affiliated with the IRGC, reported that security forces had fatally shot two young men, Mehdi Abaei and Alireza Karbasi, near the city of Hamedan in western Iran. The victims, who were reportedly on a hiking trip, were killed under still-unexplained circumstances. On July 19, members of the Basij paramilitary force shot and killed a family driving past a checkpoint, including a baby, Raha. The exiled crown prince, Reza Pahlavi, expressed on X that these actions by Iran's own leaders show the desperate nature of the regime "taking revenge for its humiliation by murdering children".

=== Internal tension and paranoia ===
In June, the government's inner circle appeared to be entering a phase of acute paranoia. In the wake of Israel's initial strikes, the leadership amplified a climate of suspicion at the highest levels. The leadership, worried by the risks of both external subversion and internal betrayal, was predicted to be likely to retreat even further from the public sphere. According to one observer, appearances by the Supreme Leader were expected to become increasingly rare and limited to tightly stage-managed events, carefully insulated from any spontaneous interaction.

The possibility of fear spreading to the wider Iranian population was predicted. Iranians expressed their concern that the government could "take out all [its] anger" on civilians. In such a scenario, the people would no longer be seen merely as passive subjects, but as potential adversaries. The government, in its heightened state of insecurity, could come to view society as an internal threat, one to be monitored, contained, and, if necessary, repressed.

=== Censorship ===
On 17–18 June 2025, there was a widespread internet blackout, which slashed traffic by around 97%. In early July, the Iranian government again implemented nationwide internet shutdowns, including a blackout beginning on July 6, which dropped connectivity to roughly 20% of normal levels. Government messaging framed this as a cybersecurity defense against Israeli attacks, while observers highlighted the economic damage (estimated at $1.5 million/hour loss) and the tightening reliance on the Air‑gapped "National Information Network".

=== Defection of Iranian diplomats ===
In January 2026, a senior official at Iran's permanent mission to the UN, Alireza Jeyrani Hokmabad, requested asylum from Switzerland, deciding not to return to Iran out of fear of the social upheaval there. Hokmabad is reportedly one of several Iranian diplomats who requested asylum from European countries due to the protests. On 3 February 2026, it was reported that a second diplomat, Gholam-Reza Derikvand, Chargé d'affaires of the Iranian embassy in Vienna, also had applied for asylum from Switzerland.

=== Plan to Counter the Influence of Foreign Intelligence Services and Governments or Entities ===
In August 2026 to protect state infrastructure and public institutions from multi-dimensional foreign interference, Iranian regime passed law establishing strict restriction on people's relations with overseas, viceversa as well as imposing 15/20 year jail sentences for unwarranted teaching classes of juveniles.

=== The Cyberspace Regulation Plan ===
In September 2026 Iranian regime introduced new bill called Cyberspace Regulation that gives gateways authority to the Supreme Cyberspace Council strengthening government control over domestic platforms.

=== Party of Hezbollah, Iran ===
Ayatallah Mohamedbaqer Kharazi Hezbollah chief was arrested after calling for coup toppling government and nuclear weaponization.

=== Ayatallah Hamid Resai ===
In September 2026 his op-ed on 9-dey magazine Ayatallah Hamid Resaei criticized Ghalibaf calling him a parliamentary dictator, he was shortly after jailed for 9 month afterward.

== See also ==
- May 2025 Iranian protests
- 2026 United States military buildup in the Middle East
- Water scarcity in Iran
- Reactions to the Twelve-Day War
- Censorship in Iran
- 2023–2024 European Union farmers' protests
