= Execution of Seyyed Mohammad Hosseini =

Iranian protestor (1983–2023)

Seyyed Mohammad Hosseini
- Born: 21 February 1983
- Died: 7 January 2023 (aged 39)
- Cause of death: Execution by hanging
- Known for: Fourth execution related to the Mahsa Amini protests
- Criminal charges: Mofsed-e-filarz ("corruption on Earth")
- Penalty: Death

Seyyed Mohammad Hosseini (Persian: سید محمد حسینی; 21 February 1983 – 7 January 2023) was a 39-year-old Iranian man who was executed by Iran's Islamic Republic for his participation in the Mahsa Amini protests. He was also known as Kian Hosseini. He was found guilty of Fisad-e-filarz (an Arabic term translating to "corruption on Earth") for his alleged involvement in the murder of a Basij militiaman during demonstrations in Karaj during the 40th-day memorial of Hadis Najafi. Hosseini was hanged with Mohammad Mehdi Karami, a 21-year-old sportsman who was also convicted of Fisad-e-filarz for his alleged role in the same killing. Hosseini maintained his innocence throughout his detention and trial.

== Background ==
=== Mahsa Amini protests ===
Thousands of protesters were detained as a result of the Mahsa Amini protests, and dozens were charged with offenses such as Moharebeh ("waging war against God") or Fisad-e-filarz ("corruption on Earth"), which are punishable by death in the Islamic Republic of Iran. Prior to Hosseini and Karami's executions, Iranian authorities executed Mohsen Shekari and Majidreza Rahnavard, both of whom were convicted of Moharebeh for different claimed acts related to the Mahsa Amini protests.

=== Personal life ===
Seyyed Mohammad Hosseini was an Iranian martial arts athlete and Kickboxing champion in 2003. People who knew him well said the swords and knives discovered in his house were his martial arts equipment. He himself stated in both the short film of "Court" and "Reconstruction of the site of Ajmian's murder" released by the state media that those equipment were "for exercising." He used to coach teenagers in martial arts for free.

Every Thursday, Hosseini would pay his respects at his parents' graves. He was detained on Hadis Najafi's 40th memorial day, while on his way to pay his respects at his parents' graves, who are buried in the same cemetery as Hadis Najafi. He consistently said that he had no involvement in the alleged crime and had not even attended the demonstrations.

== Allegations, arrest, and trial ==
Hosseini was arrested in relation to the killing of a Basij Militiaman by the name of Roohollah Ajamian. According to Masoud Setayeshi, spokesperson for the Iranian judiciary, a gang of individuals referred to as "rioters" followed Ajamian with knives and stones, stripped him naked, and murdered him during a rally commemorating the anniversary of Hadis Najafi's death. Protesters and anti-government demonstrators were regularly referred to as "rioters" by the Iranian regime. On the day of the alleged crime, videos appeared on social media showing a major highway closed off with Ajamian's corpse laying on the ground, clothed in a Basij outfit (despite the allegation that Ajamian had been stripped nude). In connection with Ajamian's death, Iranian officials apprehended sixteen people: thirteen adult males, including Seyyed Mohammad Hosseini, and three juvenile boys. Setayeshi's investigation provided no proof to back up the allegations that Karami and Hosseini were engaged in the purported crime.

On 3 November 2022, Hosseini was charged with "corruption on earth by committing crimes against the security of the country," "attacking police officers and Basij," and "gathering and conspiring against the security of the country" in a session of the Karaj Revolutionary Court presided over by Judge Moosa Asefolhosseini. During the court hearing, he said in his defense, "I do not accept the claims brought against me." Neither Hosseini nor Karami were formally charged with first-degree murder but rather with vague accusations that the Islamic Republic authorities often employ against political detainees.

The Islamic Revolutionary Court tried the case of Hosseini and the other accused adults. The trial of Hosseini lasted less than a week. He was denied the ability to pick his own lawyer and was instead represented by a government-appointed attorney. His state-appointed lawyer's identity has not been published in any of the court reports or news articles on him in any of the official media. He had only seen his state-appointed lawyer in court and didn't know his name. Ali Sharifzadeh Ardakani, a Tehran-based lawyer, sought to defend him in court, but the judge refused. Hosseini consistently rejected the claims brought against him.

Hosseini was sentenced to death on 5 December 2022, alongside Mohammad Mehdi Karami and three other men. The remaining eleven inmates, including three adolescents, received hefty prison sentences. On 3 January 2023, the Iranian Supreme Court accepted petitions from three protestors due to insufficient investigations. However, Hosseini and Karami death sentences were maintained.

In another video released by state media, he said that he was among the last people to reach the scene of the incident: "The whole time I was there was less than 10 seconds. There was a woman in that place, and there were five men, one of whom had a knife in his hand and was insulting the martyr [Ajamian]. After seeing these scenes, I left the place and did not stay there." According to the prosecutor's representative and the judge, Seyyed Mohammad Hosseini, the second-tier defendant in Ajamian's case, confessed that he "pressed the knife into Ajamian's body two times with the size of two knuckles, and on the third time he inserted it a little into Ajamian's body." In the state-media video from the court, however, this sentence was only said by another defendant, while Seyyed Mohammad Hosseini strongly maintained his innocence.

On 19 December 2022, Ali Sharifzadeh Ardakani, a human rights advocate, revealed that Hosseini had been tortured, saying that he "got to meet with Seyyed Mohammad Hosseini in the prison." According to Mr. Sharifzadeh: "I met Seyyed Mohammad Hosseini in Karaj prison. His narrative was full with tears. Torture, beating with the eyes, wrists, and feet tied, kicking the head and knocking unconscious, an iron rod to the soles of the feet and shocks throughout the body, a man whose confessions were obtained through torture and have no legal basis."

== Responses ==
Following the killings of Hosseini and Karami, the UN High Commissioner for Human Rights (OHCHR) asked Iran to "halt all executions." "We deplore the execution of two more protestors, #MohammadMehdiKarami & #SeyyedMohammadHosseini, following unfair trials based on forced confessions," the OHCHR tweeted on 7 January 2023. The OHCHR condemned Iran's death of protesters as "shocking," despite worldwide outrage.

In a statement, Iran Human Rights director Mahmoud Amiry-Moghaddam said, "The executions are an extension of the killing of defenceless protesters in prison and have no legal basis."

According to a spokesman for the European Union's top diplomat, Josep Borrell, the killings have "appalled" the EU. It urged Iranian authorities to "immediately put an end to the highly reprehensible practice of... carrying out death sentences" and to "cancel without delay" any scheduled executions.

== See also ==
- Mahsa Amini protests
- Death sentences during the Mahsa Amini protests
- Execution of Mohsen Shekari
- Execution of Majidreza Rahnavard
- Execution of Mohammad Mehdi Karami
