= Execution of Mohammad Mehdi Karami =

2023 punishment of an Iranian protestor

Mohammad Mehdi Karami
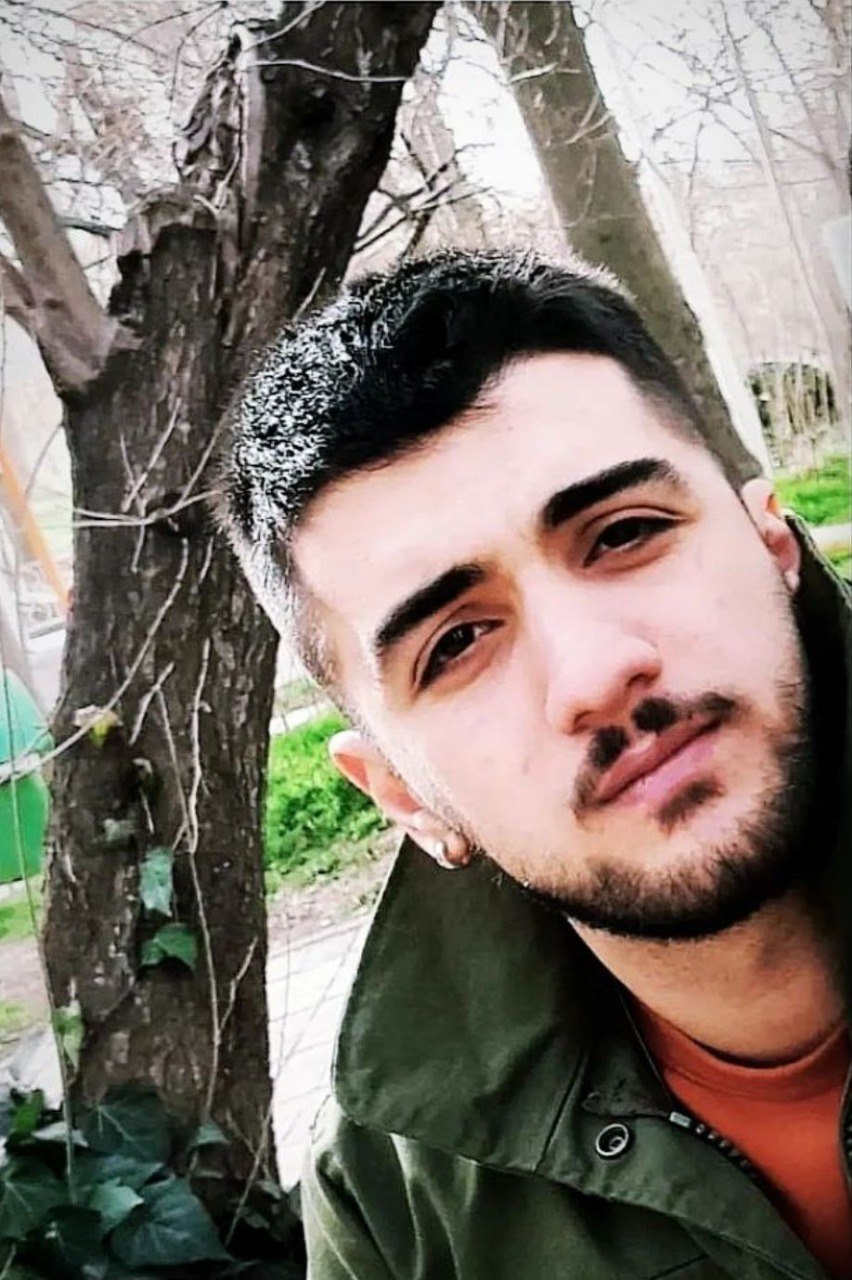
- Born: c. 1 November 2001
- Died: 7 January 2023 (aged 21)
- Cause of death: Execution by hanging
- Known for: Third execution related to the Mahsa Amini protests
- Criminal charges: Mofsed-e-filarz ("corruption on Earth")
- Penalty: Death

Mohammad Mehdi Karami (Persian: محمدمهدی کرمی; c. 1 November 2001 – 7 January 2023) was a 21-year-old Iranian-Kurdish man who was executed by the Islamic Republic of Iran for his involvement in the Mahsa Amini protests. He was convicted of Fisad-e-filarz (an Arabic term translating to "corruption on Earth") for allegedly being involved in the killing of a Basij militiaman during protests in Karaj commemorating the 40-day anniversary of Hadis Najafi's death. Karami was executed alongside 39-year-old volunteer children's coach Seyyed Mohammad Hosseini, another man who was also convicted of Fisad-e-filarz for his alleged involvement in the same killing. Both Karami and Hosseini asserted their innocence, and human rights organizations have accused Iranian authorities of using "shoddy evidence" to convict them.

== Background ==
=== Mahsa Amini protests ===
Thousands of protesters were detained as a result of the Mahsa Amini protests, and dozens were charged with offenses such as Moharebeh ("waging war against God") or Mofsed-e-filarz ("corruption on Earth"), which are punishable by death in the Islamic Republic of Iran. Prior to the executions of Karami and Hosseini, Iranian authorities executed Mohsen Shekari and Majidreza Rahnavard, who were both convicted of Moharebeh due to separate alleged crimes connected to the Mahsa Amini protests.

Most trials have taken place in Iran's Islamic Revolutionary Court system. The system has received international criticism for holding trials behind closed doors and often not allowing defendants to review the evidence against them. In Tehran, most trials have been presided over by Judge Abolqasem Salavati, who faces U.S. sanctions for meting out harsh punishments. A statement by the United States Department of the Treasury criticized Salavati for handing down more than 100 death sentences and lengthy prison sentences to political prisoners, human rights activists, media workers, and "others seeking to exercise freedom of assembly."

Analysts have warned that the Islamic Republic is "determined to carry out mass executions," and "keeps the execution cases as vague as possible to 'confuse' domestic and international reactions until the last minute." Hossein Bastani, a prominent political analyst for BBC Persian, said that "worldwide, practical reactions might still prevent a human disaster." CNN independently confirmed in late December 2022 that there were 43 people under death sentences for crimes related to their involvement in the protests.

=== Mohammad Mehdi Karami's early life ===
Prior to his execution, Karami was a karate champion. He had a tattoo of the Olympic rings on his arm. Karami's cousin described him as "a brave, intelligent boy" who became interested in karate when he was 11 years old. He joined the Iranian youth national team and won at the national championships. In a video begging Iranian authorities not to execute his son, his father said Karami was "the fourth ranked member on Iran's national team."

== Allegations, arrest, and trial ==
Iranian Judiciary spokesman Masoud Setayeshi was cited in a report alleging that a group of men, therein referred to as "rioters," chased Ajamian with knives and stones, stripped him naked, and killed him during a demonstration to honor the 40-day anniversary of the death of Hadis Najafi. The Iranian government frequently referred to protesters and anti-government demonstrators as "rioters." On the day of the alleged crime, videos circulated on social media showing a prominent highway cordoned off with Ajamian's body, clad in a Basij uniform (despite the report claiming Ajamian had been stripped naked), lying lifeless on the ground. Iranian authorities detained sixteen people – thirteen adult men, including Mohammad Mehdi Karami and Seyyed Mohammad Hosseini, and three juvenile boys – in connection with Ajamian's killing. Setayeshi's report did not provide evidence to support the accusations that Karami and Hosseini were involved in the alleged crime.

During his arrest, Karami said that he was beaten severely and subjected to "severe physical and mental abuse by government agents," alleging that security forces beat him "so hard [during his arrest], that he lost consciousness," leading arresting officers to believe he was dead; they then "threw his body near a courthouse," but before they left, "they realized he was still alive." Seyyed Mohammad Hosseini and his lawyer also accused authorities of using torture to extract his own confession; Hosseini's lawyer told Iran International that his confession was not legally valid because it was obtained "under torture," and that Hosseini recited his confession while "full of tears," alleging that authorities blindfolded him, bound his hands and feet, kicked him in the head "until he fainted," struck the soles of his feet with an iron rod, and electrically shocked different parts of his body. Amnesty International similarly alleged that Karami's confession was extracted through torture as well and that authorities relied on those forced confessions and "shoddy evidence" when convicting Karami and Hosseini.

=== Trial ===
The juveniles were tried in Iran's Criminal Courts, while Karami, Hosseini, and the other accused adults were tried in the Islamic Revolutionary Court. Karami and Hosseini's trials, before Judge Moosa Asefolhosseini, lasted for less than one week. According to Karami's family and human rights groups, the two were denied the right to choose their own attorneys; the government appointed attorneys to represent them instead. At trial, both men denied the allegations made against them. On 5 December 2022, Karami and Hosseini were sentenced to death alongside three other men. The remaining eleven detainees, including the three juveniles, were sentenced to lengthy prison terms. The Supreme Court of Iran accepted appeals from three demonstrators, claiming inadequate investigations, on 3 January 2023. However, the death sentences of Karami and Hosseini were upheld.

== Imprisonment and execution ==
Weeks before Karami's execution, his parents appeared in a video posted on social media begging Iranian authorities not to execute their son. His parents also alleged that Iranian authorities had tortured Karami during his time in detention. Karami's parents insisted that despite his mistreatment behind bars, he was in "good spirits," but "physically damaged" from the torture he had suffered. While Karami awaited execution, jailers also allegedly subjected him to rape threats and sexual assault.

The day before Karami's execution, Iranian authorities arrested Mehdi Beik, the political editor of Etemad, who had conducted interviews with the family members of condemned Iranian protesters, including Karami's father.

Mohammad Mehdi Karami and Seyyed Mohammad Hosseini were hanged early on 7 January 2023, state-affiliated Fars News Agency reported. The executions brought the total number of anti-regime protesters executed as a result of their alleged involvement in the Mahsa Amini protests to four.

Mohammad Hossein Aghasi, a lawyer advocating for Karami, said on Twitter that Karami was not granted the last chance to talk to his family before his execution. Aghasi also stated that Karami began a dry food hunger strike three days before his execution to protest Iranian authorities' refusal to allow Aghasi to represent him.

== Responses ==
=== Human rights organizations ===
Following the hangings of Karami and Hosseini, the Office of the United Nations High Commissioner for Human Rights (OHCHR) urged Iran to halt all executions. The OHCHR tweeted on 7 January 2023, "We deplore the execution of two more protesters, #MohammadMehdiKarami & #MohammadHosseini, following unfair trials based on forced confessions." The OHCHR described Iran's execution of protestors despite international outcry as "shocking."

In a statement, Iran Human Rights director Mahmoud Amiry-Moghaddam said, "The executions are an extension of the killing of defenceless protesters in prison and have no legal basis."

Hadi Ghaemi, the director of the Center for Human Rights in Iran, condemned the executions, stating, "The Islamic Republic has demonstrated yet again that it has no policy but reliance on maximum violence to address ongoing and growing opposition to its rule."

=== International groups and figures ===
The European Union released a statement saying that it was "appalled" by the executions and described the killings as "yet another sign of the Iranian authorities' violent repression of civilian demonstrations."

Robert Malley, the United States Special Envoy for Iran, tweeted that he was "[a]ppalled by the regime's execution of two more young Iranians after sham trials. These executions must stop. We and others across the globe will continue to hold Iran's leadership accountable."

=== Public figures ===
Following Karami and Hosseini's executions, over 50 American celebrities, including Cate Blanchett, Jason Momoa, Bryan Cranston, and Olivia Wilde, participated in a campaign calling for Iran to stop executing protesters. The campaign was organized by Iranian-American screenwriter Nicole Najafi, Iranian-American director/writer/producer Ana Lily Amirpour, and Iranian-American actress Mozhan Marnò. The campaign featured the celebrities holding up a piece of paper with the caption "#StopExecutionsInIran" written across it, with a textual message onscreen reading, "We stand with the people of Iran in their fight for freedom. Thousands of protesters have been arrested. Some have already been executed. Many more are in danger. But the world is watching."

== See also ==
- Mahsa Amini protests
- Death sentences during the Mahsa Amini protests
- Political repression in the Islamic Republic of Iran
- Execution of Mohsen Shekari
- Execution of Majidreza Rahnavard
- Execution of Mohammad Hosseini
