= Imprisonment of Ali Younesi =

Iranian political prisoner

Ali Younesi
- علی یونسی
- Born: Ali Younesi; September 22, 2000 (age 26)
- Education: Computer engineering (Sharif University of Technology)
- Notable work: Gold Medal at the 2018 International Olympiad on Astronomy and Astrophysics

The imprisonment of Ali Younesi refers to the ongoing imprisonment of Ali Younesi, a computer engineering student at Sharif University of Technology. He is a silver medalist at the 2016 National Astronomy Olympiad, a gold medalist at the 2017 National Astronomy Olympiad, a member of the 12th Iranian World Astronomy Olympiad team, and a gold medalist at the 2018 International Olympiad on Astronomy and Astrophysics.

Younesi was arrested on the evening of April 20, 2020, by plainclothes officers from the Intelligence Organization of the Islamic Revolutionary Guard Corps. On May 5, 2020, Gholam-Hossein Esmaeili, a spokesman for the Judicial system of the Islamic Republic of Iran, accused him and another detained student of having ties to the People's Mujahideen and attempting to carry out subversive activities, without mentioning his name. Younesi and Amirhossein Moradi were sentenced to 16 years in prison on April 25, 2022.

== Arrest ==
Younesi was arrested by security forces on the evening of Friday, March 20, 2020. Younesi's brother, Reza Younesi, wrote on his personal X account on April 21, 2020, that 12 plainclothes officers came to their home, beat and injured Ali's forehead, arrested him, and confiscated his personal belongings. Reza Younesi also stated that the officers also took his parents with them, despite their poor health, and they were released after five hours. According to Reza Younesi, the officers did not have any warrants with them when they arrested him.

Regarding the arrest of Ali Younesi and Amirhossein Moradi, the Iranian Students' Union stated that plainclothes officers arrested the two students without a warrant and by beating them.

On May 3, 2020, Reza Younesi announced that after 24 days of Ali Younesi's arrest, his brother was not allowed to contact his family. He also stated that his parents had gone to the Evin Prison Prosecutor's Office on the May 3 and 4, 2020, but they were not allowed inside. He wrote on his X page: "Ali, we hope they did not commit suicide."

On Thursday, June 11, 2020, Reza Younesi, Ali Younesi's brother, announced that he had been transferred to a collective prison after two months of solitary confinement and had contracted COVID-19 in solitary confinement.

Five months after the arrest, Aida Younesi, Ali Younesi's sister, wrote on her X page that after five months, the case was still in the hands of the Ministry of Intelligence. On September 21, 2020, Ali Younesi's lawyer, Mostafa Nili, announced on X that the temporary detention order had expired on September 15, 2020, and according to Ali Younesi, no new detention order had been issued for him and he had not been interrogated for two weeks. However, he has not been released yet.

On June 18, 2025, Younesi's family announced his sudden and forced transfer from Evin Prison to an unknown location.

=== Yousef Younesi ===
Plain-clothed officers arrested Yousef Younesi, his father, in Shahroud on December 22, 2022, without a warrant. On Monday, January 2, 2022, the Iranian Ministry of Intelligence announced in a statement that a group of arrests had been made in several provinces in connection with the "network of financing and equipping the operational teams of the MEK." The statement confirmed Yousef Younesi's arrest, without naming him. Yousef Younesi was sentenced to five years in prison on charges of collaborating with the MEK.

== Accusations ==
On Tuesday, April 21, 2022, Gholam-Hossein Esmaeili, a spokesman for the Judicial system of the Islamic Republic of Iran, accused the two arrested students of being linked to the counter-revolution and the People's Mojaheedin Organization (PMOI), claiming: "They were affiliated with groups opposed to the Islamic Republic and intended to cause sabotage." Esmaeili stated that they had been trained by the PMOI and had failed to cause sabotage in Tehran. He stated that the arrests were carried out by the Ministry of Intelligence's Soldiers of the Time; and he also claimed that explosive devices had been discovered in their homes. He also stated that family members of one of the two students are members of the PMOI. However, Esmaeili did not name the two arrested students.

On April 11, 2023, Mostafa Nili, Ali Younesi's lawyer, said that Amirhossein Moradi and Ali Younesi had been accused of "corruption on earth."

== Confessions ==
After 3 months of Amirhossein Moradi and Ali Younesi's arrest, a meeting was held at the request of Sharif University of Technology on Monday, June 22, 2023, with the presence of representatives of student organizations, university officials, and the judiciary. According to BBC Persian, the meeting turned into an interrogation and forced confession. Ali Younesi stated in the meeting that he was not interested in attending the meeting and requested that he be allowed to go to court with a lawyer to defend himself. He also said: "I am also worried about my family right now, lest they face problems."

== Confession video ==
On November 22, 2021, media outlets and social media outlets close to the IRGC, including Fars News Agency, released a short video of the confessions of Ali Younesi and Amirhossein Moradi, along with images of how to make bombs and mortars. The Iran Human Rights subsequently expressed concern over the broadcast of a video file of forced confessions attributed to Ali Younesi and Amirhossein Moradi by the Islamic Republic's media, and warned of the possibility of severe sentences being issued against the two imprisoned students.

Mahmood Amiry-Moghaddam, director of the Iranian Human Rights Organization, said in this regard: "The accusations of the judiciary against Ali Younesi and Amirhossein Moradi are without any credibility. We are concerned that these case-making will pave the way for a widespread and brutal crackdown on the regime's opponents, especially the student movement, and we warn of a human rights catastrophe in the months following the coronavirus pandemic."

== Conviction ==
The first court hearing of Ali Younesi and Amirhossein Moradi was held on June 26, 2021, after 450 days of detention. In the final court hearing on April 25, 2022, Ali Younesi and Amirhossein Moradi, both 22 years old, were sentenced to 16 years in prison on charges of "Mofsed-e-filarz," "gathering and colluding against the regime," and "propaganda against the regime."

== Reactions ==
- Firouz Naderi, a former senior administrator at NASA, tweeted about the arrest of Ali Younesi: "This regime, which has a history of chaining its scientists, is asking those educated abroad to return to Iran and serve their country, while arresting and imprisoning senior Iranian students on fabricated pretexts."
- House of Commons of the United Kingdom and House of Lords, in a press statement, condemned the arrest of elite students by the Iranian regime, especially amid the coronavirus outbreak, and called on the British government to increase international pressure on the Iranian regime to release these prisoners.
- United States calls for Tehran to release two Iranian college students arrested during COVID-19 pandemic.
- Human Rights Watch condemned the arrest of Ali Younesi and Amirhossein Moradi without any credible or reasonable evidence, as well as their detention in solitary confinement for two months. The organization stressed that the authorities of the must immediately release the two students.
- Iranian Human Rights called for the international community to respond to the arrest of the two students.
- Amnesty International called for his release in a statement, citing the risk of "torture and other ill-treatment."
- Gabi Rolland, a representative of the Social Democratic Party of Germany, took on the role of "political adoption" and provided political support to Ali Younesi. She undertakes the responsibility to consistently call for the respect of the prisoner's rights and ultimate release through direct contact, telephone and correspondence with embassies and government officials in the prisoner's hometown.
- Sharif University of Technology's students and graduates wrote a letter to Ali Khamenei, emphasizing the unnatural nature of this case and the psychological pressure on Amirhossein Moradi and Ali Younesi, calling for their release.
- Sharif University of Technology's professors wrote a letter to the authorities of the Islamic Republic calling for the release of Ali Younesi and Amirhossein Moradi on the occasion of Eid al-Fitr and their return to their families and academic community.
- Nobel Prize winners and academic researchers wrote a letter to UN Secretary-General Antonio Guterres calling for the release of Ali Younesi and Amirhossein Moradi. Barry Barish and Randy Schekman were among the signatories to the letter.
