= Hassan Afshar =

Iranian teenager executed for rape

- حسن افشار
- Born: Hassan Afshar; 1996 or 1997; Iran
- Died: 18 July 2016 (aged 19); Arak Prison, Arak, Markazi province, Iran
- Cause of death: Execution by hanging
- Status: Executed
- Convictions: Rape, sodomy
- Criminal charges: Rape, sodomy
- Penalty: Death

Details
- Date apprehended: December 2014

Hassan Afshar (1996/1997 – 18 July 2016) was a 19-year-old Iranian man executed on 18 July 2016 at the Arak Prison in Arak, Markazi province, Iran, for allegedly raping a teenage boy in December 2014 when he was 17 years old.

The case sparked debate and condemnation for Iran's execution of juveniles and the persecution of homosexuals, after Afshar denied raping the boy and said that the intercourse had been consensual.

== Background ==
Following the Iranian Revolution in 1979, the Islamic government took a proactive role in persecuting LGBTQ people, especially gay men. While the government denied the existence of homosexuals in Iran, as president Mahmoud Ahmadinejad said before an auditorium of students at Columbia University in New York in 2007, there have been multiple instances of prosecution of men accused of "sodomy" under the country's Sharia.

In July 2005, two teenagers –Mahmoud Asgari and Ayaz Marhoni– were publicly hanged in Mashhad following a conviction of rape of a 13-year-old boy. However, LGBTQ rights activist Peter Tatchell denounced on OutRage! that Asgari and Marhoni had been, in fact, executed for consensual homosexual relations between them. In 2007, Makwan Moloudzadeh, another young man, was executed after being convicted on three counts of rape, with Tatchell accusing the Iranian government of killing gay men. However, some other LGBTQ+ rights activists, like Scott Long, have questioned Tatchell's approach to the issue of homophobia in Iran.

In 2012, Iran adopted a new penal code which modified the distinction between two men engaged in a homosexual relationship. The new law found mitigation in the man exercising as a top or active and aggravating factors in the one being the bottom or passive in sex. While the active man faces 100 lashes for the sodomy charge, the passive partner is liable to the death sentence. Mehri Jafari, a lawyer who has taken up cases of homosexual men in Iran, has said that the new code increased the probability of crossed confessions, with a passive partner saying that he was raped, the active one would be executed, while those accused of rape usually claim that the act was consensual, which would make the accuser eligible for execution.

== Afshar case ==
In December 2014, 17-year-old Afshar was arrested along with two other youths, accused of raping another teenage boy in unrelated and separate occasions. According to rights group, including Amnesty International, Afshar was denied a lawyer and was quickly sentenced to death after a two-month investigation. He was convicted of lavat beh onf, which translates as a forced homosexual anal intercourse. IranWire reported in August 2016 that due to Afshar being 17 at the time of the offense, the Iranian judiciary waited for him to turn 19 to put him to death.

Afshar maintained his innocence until his death, denying that he had raped the adolescent, and alleged that they had consented to have sex. The complaint was issued by the teenage boy's parents, with the alleged victim not testifying.

In March 2016, the Supreme Court confirmed the lower court's ruling and upheld Afshar's death sentence. The judiciary had nonetheless promised his family that a new investigation would begin on 15 September. However, on 18 July 2016, Afshar was executed by hanging at Arak Prison in Arak, without receiving a prior notification, allegedly to spare him psychological distress.

== Reactions ==
The execution of Ashraf was part of a wave of at least 10 Sunni prisoners put to death in July 2016.

Mahmood Amiry-Moghaddam, the spokesperon for Iran Human Rights, a Norway-based NGO, condemned the executions and said that "many if not all" of the prisoners had been subjected to unfair trials and torture. The regional office of Amnesty International strongly condemned Afshar's execution, with its deputy Magdalena Mughrabi, saying that the Iranian government showed a "sickening enthusiasm" for putting juveniles to death, adding that the criminalization of consensual gay sex violates international law.

Zeid bin Ra'ad, the UN High Commissioner for Human Rights, also condemned the execution of Afshar, calling the death penalty on juveniles "particularly abhorrent", and labelling the trial as part of "vague criminal charges" against mostly Kurdish or Sunni prisoners.

Afshar's execution was not well received by many Iranians, forcing the judiciary to postpone the scheduled hanging of another juvenile offender due to public outcry amid an increasing campaign against the overuse of the death penalty in the country.
