= Reactions to the Twelve-Day War =

Countries which condemned the Israeli strikes on Iran Countries which expressed concern and/or called for restraint Countries which expressed support for Israel

On 13 June 2025, Israel launched a surprise attack on Iran by bombing several military and nuclear facilities, beginning the Twelve-Day War and drawing varied reactions across governments and non-governmental entities. The majority of reactions within the Iranian government and public were negative, although some in the Iranian diaspora called for an overthrow of the government. Israeli Prime Minister Benjamin Netanyahu issued a statement addressing the citizens of Iran.

Countries across the world issued their own statements in regards to their stance on the conflict, predominately expressing condemnation of Israeli strikes on Iran or calling on the two countries to de-escalate tensions, and more broadly to de-escalate tensions within the scope of the Middle East. Among Israeli allies, several expressed support for the strikes on Iran, while others issued no official statement. There were also some demonstrations in response to the war.

== Iran ==
=== Government ===
The spokesman of the Iranian Armed Forces, Abolfazl Shekarchi, vowed to retaliate against Israel and the United States. Supreme Leader Ali Khamenei released a statement following the strikes, calling the attacks a "crime" and warned that the "Zionist regime prepared for itself a bitter and painful fate". The Iranian Foreign Ministry stated that Iran has the "legal and legitimate" right to respond to Israeli attacks under the UN Charter, also stating that the US will also be responsible for the "dangerous effects and consequences of the Zionist regime's adventure". The IRGC stated that it is ready to respond even after the death of its chief, Hossein Salami. Ahmad Vahidi was appointed as a temporary IRGC commander until Ali Khamenei appointed Major General Mohammad Pakpour. MP Alaeddin Boroujerdi said that "Iran will not participate in the sixth round of nuclear talks with the United States on [15 June] and until further notice." Former President Mohammad Khatami called for condemnation of this "criminal act" and said that the UN should be at the "forefront" in the effort "to prevent further tragedies by seriously and comprehensively" condemning Israel. Iran warned the United States, United Kingdom, and France that any assistance to Israel will result in their regional bases and ships being targeted, and one of the Iranian missiles has caused damage to the US consulate in Tel Aviv. On 13 June, the head of the Islamic Consultative Assembly's Councils Committee declared that "the Zionist regime and the United States should know that they will receive a swift, decisive, and shattering response." The following day, Mohammad-Reza Bahonar, a member of the Expediency Council, called for targeting U.S. positions in the region, accusing Washington of deceit and urging it to reconsider its support for Israel. Iran's communications ministry announced nationwide internet restrictions. On 19 June 2025, senior official Mohsen Rezaee said that the Israeli attacks was aimed to create chaos in the country by killing top military leaders, but the plan was repelled, saying that Israel's goals is to turn Iran into Syria and plunge it into a 10-year insecurity.

On 24 June 2025, President Masoud Pezeshkian gave a televised address describing the ceasefire as a "great victory". Iranian media claimed that the truce had been imposed on "the enemy" after four waves of attacks on "Israeli-occupied territories", and its National Security Council that it had "shattered the enemy's primary strategic goal". The government sought to convey its resilience, highlighting societal cohesion and civilian solidarity with its aims. Some reports suggested that moderate clerical and political figures had previously urged a truce on Supreme Leader Ali Khamenei, among them former president Hassan Rouhani, Supreme Leader advisor Ali Larijani, and Expediency Discernment Council chief Sadiq Larijani; a portion of these were rumored to have contemplated sidelining or ousting the Supreme Leader if the latter continued stonewalling negotiators. The Islamic Revolutionary Guard Corps (IRGC) in a detailed statement claimed that it was under the leadership of Khamenei throughout the war, and that the 22nd wave of Operation True Promise III had pressured the enemy to call for a ceasefire.

Iranian security forces have initiated a broad crackdown on individuals accused of sharing content considered "supportive of Israel." On 13 June, the Hormozgan Provincial Police Command reported the arrest of 14 citizens, claiming that, after the Israeli strikes, they "attempted to disturb public opinion and spread rumors in cyberspace were identified through technical and intelligence measures". At least 10 Iranians were held in custody on espionage charges linked to Israel.

Homayoun Sameh, the Jewish representative in Iran's parliament, stated that Israel is committing war crimes and crimes against humanity and also emphasized that Iranian Jews are part of the Iranian people. A Jewish community representative in Isfahan publicly condemned Israel's strikes on Iran's nuclear facilities, calling them acts of "brutality" that caused the deaths of "beloved compatriots, including innocent children."

=== Iranian public ===
Following the Israeli strikes that killed senior Iranian commanders, anger mixed with anxiety among many Iranians. In the capital, people gathered around large screens cheering as footage of Iran's missile response aired, while others expressed hope that the conflict would not escalate into full war. Protesters rallied in Tehran chanted slogans against Israel, calling for a forceful response and warning that without firm action, Iran could face the kind of devastation seen in Gaza.

==== Protests ====
On 13 June, protesters in Qom and Tehran called for retaliation. Protesters waved the flags of Iran and Palestine and carried portraits of slain IRGC general Qasem Soleimani. In Tehran, demonstrators displayed images of slain commanders and scientists, with some participants expressing that Israel's complete defeat, rather than simple retaliation, was necessary to ensure long-term security. Others expressed feeling fearful of the current situation: "We are killed a thousand times with stress, especially for people like myself who have kids".

On 20 June, after Friday prayer, The New York Times reported crowds of people moving from mosques in Tehran to central squares and condemning Israel. According to Sky News, the size of the Tehran protest was "tens of thousands". Similar protests after Friday prayers took place in Tabriz and Mashhad.

Following the ceasefire, which ended the 12-day conflict, routine activities in Tehran began to resume. Commercial establishments, public services, and internet access were gradually restored, and residents returned to daily routines. Reports indicated that some individuals engaged in community-oriented actions, such as assisting elderly neighbors, caring for stray animals, and providing temporary shelter to those displaced by the hostilities.

==== Online interviews and surveys ====
Interviews from BBC published on June 20, 2025, found divided public opinion among younger Iranians opposed to the Iranian regime. Some expressed support for Israel's actions against the Iranian government, while others rejected war as a correct method of opposition and expressed concern for civilian casualties in a prolonged war. There was also critique towards the Iranian government's response to the war, such as the decision to cut internet access and set up checkpoints to prevent evacuations in targeted areas and drive up casualty rates.

Interviews by ABC News published on 26 June, 2025, reported on young Iranians' expectations following the war. They expressed that, following decades of internal unrest and in the context of recent Israeli military actions targeting the Islamic Republic, the current regime's continued hold on power is untenable. However, there is uncertainty regarding how the change will occur. It was noted in the article that these individuals identities were with-held for their safety following recent arrests and executions.

An Iran International article expressed civilians disappointment in Khamenei during and after the war. One referred to him as a "coward" hiding in his bunker, another said Khamenei is living in an "illusion", believing Iran won the war and passing a message of victory. Iran International also reported a survey conducted by GAMAAN at the end of September 2025, with over 30,000 Iranian participants, reporting their responses to the Twelve-Day War: 44% believe that the Islamic Republic is responsible for starting the war, while only 33% blame Israel. More than half (51%) think that Israel achieved its objectives, compared to only 16% who believe the Islamic Republic was successful. 42% expressed anger toward the Islamic Republic during the war. 63% believe that the war was between Israel and the Islamic Republic, not against the Iranian people. 58% responded that the Islamic Republic failed to protect the population. 58% gave a negative rating to the performance of Supreme Leader Ali Khamenei during the war. 69% think that the Islamic Republic should stop calling for the destruction of Israel. 47% agree that to prevent another war, the Islamic Republic must stop uranium enrichment, while 49% oppose Iran developing nuclear weapons.

According to The Washington Post, state restrictions and reluctance among Iranians to speak openly with international media make it "difficult to gauge public sentiment in Iran." Ongoing economic challenges, political restrictions, and international tensions have led to widespread frustration and disillusionment regarding prospects for reform. Some Iranians interviewed by the Post expressed satisfaction at the deaths of certain government officials, with a few using the Eid al-Ghadir holiday to express such sentiments. Others suggested that the news seemed more alarming to observers abroad, noting that Iranians have endured significant hardships in the past. Demonstrations in support of the government and against Israel were also reported. NPR quoted one woman expressing approval of the Israeli attack, while others described the news as a rare moment of relief amid years of difficulties. Some Iranians chanted slogans against Supreme Leader Khamenei, while social media users proposed symbolic targets like state-run media and his son Mojtaba Khamenei, linked to past crackdowns. However, some observers expressed concern that destabilizing the leadership through targeted killings could lead to anarchy and broader regional instability.

=== Iranian diaspora ===
Support

Exiled opposition figures Reza Pahlavi, Crown Prince of Iran, activist Masih Alinejad, Dutch-Iranian legal scholar Afshin Ellian, Dutch, Swedish, and Canadian politicians Ulysse Ellian, Alireza Akhondi and Goldie Ghamari and actress Nazanin Boniadi, expressed support for an overthrow of the Iranian government amidst the fighting with Israel, with some also supporting the Israeli strikes. The People's Mojahedin of Iran (MKO) co-leader Maryam Rajavi called on the Iranian people to overthrow the government, while not openly supporting Israel. She also warned against negotiating with Khamenei.

Opposition

The US-based National Iranian American Council condemned Israel's attack, writing that it "lacked legal justification under international law" and "unnecessarily endangered the lives of many innocent people". The Public Affairs Alliance of Iranian Americans (PAAIA) expressed deep distress and alarm over the Israeli military strikes, particularly those that impacted civilian infrastructure. Their statement affirmed, "We condemn any military aggression that endangers civilian lives and destabilizes an already volatile region".

Others also criticized the strikes. Iran analyst Arash Azizi criticized Israel for striking on the eve of talks, stating that the strikes undercut diplomatic efforts. Iranian-American policy write and activist, Trita Parsi said that Israel had "tried to sabotage any diplomacy" between the U.S. and Iran for two decades, stating they deliberately sought to derail negotiations and prevent any easing of tensions.

Columbia University professor Hamid Dabashi argued that the strikes were partly intended to shift global focus away from the "genocide in Palestine." Vali Nasr, Iranian-American academic and political scientist argues that the 12-Day War was designed to establish Israel's dominance as the preeminent power in the Middle East, with support from Washington, with no room for rivals.

== Israel ==
In a televised 13 June address, Netanyahu said, "We are at a decisive moment in Israel's history" and "we are defending the free world from the terrorism and barbarism that Iran fosters and exports across the globe." He thanked Trump for his support and said the attack was an immediate operational necessity to roll back the threat of uranium enrichment. He said the attacks would continue for "as long as is needed to complete the task of fending off the threat of annihilation against us." and that Israel's war was against the Iranian form of government and not against the Iranian people. Netanyahu convened the security cabinet as the situation unfolded. Israeli government officials said Iran already possessed enough enriched uranium for 15 nuclear bombs.

IDF Chief of Staff Eyal Zamir stated in a televised address that the Israeli Army is "mobilizing tens of thousands of soldiers and preparing across all borders," as he warned that "anyone who tries to challenge us will pay a heavy price" and that "it was at point of no return".

Israel's Defense Minister Israel Katz said Iran has crossed red lines by targeting civilians, and added that they will pay very heavy prices for that. Katz warned that "Tehran will burn" if Iran continues to fire missiles at Israel. Tel Aviv canceled its annual Pride Parade, which typically attracts tens of thousands of participants.

Opposition Yesh Atid leader Yair Lapid offered his "full support" for the operations against Iran.

Of Jewish Israelis, 83% supported Israeli strikes on Iran, compared to only 12% among Arab Israelis.

Israel-based human rights group B'Tselem stated that 50 percent of Palestinians in Israel do not have access to public shelters to seek safety amid Iranian missile attacks.

In his address, Netanyahu stated Israel's conflict was with Iran's government, not its people. Some Iranians, including diaspora voices, echoed this sentiment, calling for strikes on domestic targets. Israeli officials claimed most engagement came from within Iran, calling the response "unprecedented."

On 18 June Brigadier General Kobi Mandelblit, announced new rules on what Israeli media organisations and journalists within the country can and cannot publish about the effect of Iranian strikes, effectively restricting media coverage about the strikes.

Hostage families who protest against the government, fear their loved ones will be forgotten during the ongoing war.

On 24 June Netanyahu hailed the ceasefire as corroborating Israeli success, claiming that it marked a "historic victory" over Iranian nuclear and ballistic missile ambitions "which would stand for generations". On 27 June Katz warned the ceasefire would only last so long as Iran refrained from attempting to reconstitute its ballistic missile or nuclear programs, outlining an "enforcement plan" by which Israel would hold Iran to account–noting that since the 7 October 2023 attacks Iran was no longer immune to Israeli action, according to The Jerusalem Post.

== Supranational organizations ==
G7 leaders issued a statement at the 2025 G7 summit in Canada that read: "We affirm that Israel has a right to defend itself. We reiterate our support for the security of Israel. Iran is the principal source of regional instability and terror."

NATO called it crucial for Israel's allies to help de-escalate tensions.

UN Secretary-General António Guterres urged both sides to show maximum restraint. His spokesperson Farhan Haq stated that "the Secretary-General condemns any military escalation in the Middle East".

IAEA Director General Rafael Grossi commented that "nuclear facilities must never be attacked, regardless of the context or circumstances, as it could harm both people and the environment. Such attacks have serious implications for nuclear safety, security and safeguards, as well as regional and international peace and security."

EU European Commission President Ursula von der Leyen said that she agreed in a phone call with Israeli Prime Minister Netanyahu that "Iran should not have a nuclear weapon, without any question." She blamed Iran for the war, but called for diplomacy as the best solution.

== Others ==
=== UN member and observer states ===
- Afghanistan: The Taliban condemned the attack on Iran while expressing concern about Israel's ongoing campaign in Gaza.
- Albania: Prime Minister Edi Rama announced his support for airstrikes "to prevent the theocratic regime in Tehran from ever possessing nuclear weapons".
- Algeria: The Ministry of Foreign Affairs denounced the attacks on Iran and urged the international community, especially the UN Security Council, to take full responsibility for defending global peace and ending Israeli policies that jeopardise regional security and stability.
- Argentina: President Javier Milei backed Israel's military actions against Iran, saying that "Israel accepts the existence of other countries, but Iran does not accept the existence of Israel". Milei condemned the Iranian counter-attack against Israel, expressing support for Israel's previous military actions and stating that "[We] are fighting against evil". On 20 June 2025, Milei further commented on the war, saying that "Iran is an enemy of Argentina" and accusing the country of the AMIA bombing and the 1992 Buenos Aires Israeli embassy bombing. Milei also reaffirmed his support for "his beloved friend Netanyahu" and said that Israel "does the dirty job that others don't", further adding that Israel is "saving Western culture".
- Armenia: The Ministry of Foreign Affairs condemned the "unilateral attack against Iran [that] endanger[s] the peaceful efforts as well as overall regional stability and global peace".
- Australia: Prime Minister Anthony Albanese stated that although he is aware of the "threat that Iran becoming a nuclear state would represent to peace and security in the region", he cautioned against greater escalation, where he called for US-led dialogue to discontinue further destabilization in the region. Foreign Minister Penny Wong said that she was "alarmed" by the rising tensions between Israel and Iran, while also stating that "this risks further destabilising a region that is already volatile".
- Austria: Chancellor Christian Stocker urged Iran and Israel to be extremely cautious. Foreign Minister Beate Meinl-Reisinger echoed this sentiment, encouraging de-escalation and a return to diplomacy.
- Azerbaijan: The Ministry of Foreign Affairs conveyed its profound concern over the attacks on Iran and urged all sides to settle their issues amicably and in conformity with international legal norms and principles. It later rejected an accusation from an Iranian envoy that Israel used its territory to mount drone attacks against it as "baseless and provocative".
- Bahrain: Bahrain denounced the attacks on Iran and warned of the serious consequences for regional stability and security. It demanded restraint, de-escalation, and a lowering of tensions.
- Bangladesh: The Ministry of Foreign Affairs strongly condemned Israel's military attack on Iran, calling it a violation of international law and a threat to global peace. The country urged all sides to show restraint and stressed that "diplomacy and mutual respect remain the only viable path to lasting peace".
- Belarus: Belarus expressed serious alarm over the attacks. It claimed that using force in the war might have unpredictable worldwide repercussions, endanger regional stability and security, and spark a humanitarian crisis.
- Belgium: Foreign Minister Maxime Prévot expressed his concern about any action that contributes to additional instability in the region and said that the Israeli assault on Iran and the Iranian response represented a hazardous turning point.
- Bolivia: President Luis Arce denounced the attacks, saying they risked provoking "further instability in the region". Arce wished for a speedy return to peace and conveyed his "deep solidarity with the brotherly people and the Government of Iran".
- Bosnia and Herzegovina: Foreign Minister Elmedin Konaković denounced the attacks.
- Brazil: The Ministry of Foreign Affairs issued a statement expressing its "firm condemnation" of the Israeli strikes, calling them a "clear violation" of Iranian sovereignty and of international law.
- Brunei: The Ministry of Foreign Affairs strongly criticised the attacks on Iran, calling them a flagrant breach of Iran's sovereignty and territorial integrity. It reaffirmed Iran's right to self-defence under Article 51 of the UN Charter.
- Bulgaria: The Ministry of Foreign Affairs declared that it was closely monitoring the situation with great concern. It urged everyone to be extremely restrained and to defuse the situation right away.
- Canada: Prime Minister Mark Carney called for "maximum restraint" while reaffirming "Israel's right to defend itself and ensure its security".
- Chad: The country was one of the 21 Arab and Muslim nations that signed an Egyptian-led statement condemning the Israeli attacks on Iran.
- Chile: The Ministry of Foreign Affairs stated that the Chilean government was deeply concerned about the escalation of violence between Israel and Iran, describing it as a crisis that jeopardises regional and international peace and stability.
- China: Ministry of Foreign Affairs Spokesperson Lin Jian called for "ways conducive to regional peace and stability". China's ambassador to the UN, Fu Cong, condemned the strikes. China's embassy in Iran described the situation as "severe and complex", advising its citizens to stay alert and avoid sensitive or crowded locations as did its embassy in Tel Aviv.
- Colombia: The Ministry of Foreign Affairs stated that the Colombian government called for moderation, respect for diplomatic channels, and the use of multilateral institutions to help prevent the conflict from escalating and to allow progress toward a peaceful and long-term solution in the region.
- Comoros: The country was one of the 21 Arab and Muslim nations that signed an Egyptian-led statement condemning the Israeli attacks on Iran.
- Croatia: The Ministry of Foreign Affairs issued a statement expressing serious concern over the Middle East's escalating security situation.
- Cuba: President and Communist Party First Secretary Miguel Díaz-Canel denounced the attacks, demanded a halt to the violence, and urged adherence to international law.
- Cyprus: President Nikos Christodoulides stated that Cyprus "is not involved in any way, and its role, as always, is stabilizing and humanitarian". He expressed hope that no further escalation in the region would occur because it "does not help in any situation whatsoever".
- Czech Republic: Foreign Minister Jan Lipavský called the strikes a "reasonable reaction" to Iran's potential acquisition of nuclear weapons and support for Hamas and Hezbollah. He said he has "a great deal of understanding for ... military action aimed at preventing the production of a nuclear bomb", adding that "Iran has long failed to fulfil its obligations to the international community, is building up its nuclear program and, at the same time, uses rhetoric aimed at destroying the state of Israel".
- Djibouti: The country was one of the 21 Arab and Muslim nations that signed an Egyptian-led statement condemning the Israeli attacks on Iran.
- Egypt: The Ministry of Foreign Affairs declared that Egypt was closely monitoring the current situation. It condemned the strikes on Iran, claiming they would worsen the situation and spark a wider regional conflict with potentially unprecedented repercussions for stability and security in the region.
- Fiji: Prime Minister Sitiveni Rabuka described Israel's actions in Iran as an "act of survival" during an interview with The Australian. He stated: "They cannot survive if there is a big threat capability within range of Israel. Whatever [Israel] are doing now can be seen as pre-emptive, knocking it out before it's fired on you".
- Finland: Foreign Minister Elina Valtonen expressed grave concern over the situation, saying the cycle of military escalation must be stopped.
- France: President Emmanuel Macron called for "maximum restraint" while reaffirming "Israel's right to defend itself and ensure its security" and stating that Iran's nuclear programme was close to a "critical stage". Interior Minister Bruno Retailleau directed local authorities to increase vigilance across the country, particularly at places of worship, festive gatherings, and sites linked to Israeli and American interests.
- The Gambia: The country was one of the 21 Arab and Muslim nations that signed an Egyptian-led statement condemning the Israeli attacks on Iran.
- Georgia: The Ministry of Foreign Affairs expressed grave worry about the rising threat to regional and international security posed by the developing tensions between Iran and Israel. It made clear how crucial diplomatic efforts were to achieving de-escalation and maintaining stability.
- Germany: Chancellor Friedrich Merz praised Israel's "courage" in doing the "dirty work for all of us". He spoke positively of Israeli motivations, saying that "I can only say I have the greatest respect for the fact that the Israeli army and the Israeli government had the courage to do this", while claiming Israel lacked the weaponry needed to finish the job. He added that if negotiations failed, the complete destruction of Iran's nuclear programme "would have to be on the agenda". He further criticised the Iranian government for having allegedly "brought death and destruction to the world". In more conciliatory tones, he urged both countries to "refrain from steps that could lead to a further escalation and destabilize the whole region". In further comments, he confirmed that Netanyahu had informed him of the operation in a telephone call and that Germany was prepared to use "all available diplomatic means" to help de-escalate the conflict and that "the aim must remain that Iran not develop any nuclear weapons". He also reaffirmed Israel's "right to protect its existence and the security of its citizens". He also noted that German security services would step up protection for Jewish and Israeli sites domestically.
- Ghana: The Ministry of Foreign Affairs urged both sides to display maximum patience, prioritize communication, and embrace diplomatic channels to de-escalate the situation.
- Greece: Prime Minister Kyriakos Mitsotakis emphasised how urgently the region needs to de-escalate. He stressed that diplomacy is the only realistic way to move forward while accepting that Iran must not get a nuclear capability. He also cautioned against creating new fronts in the Middle East conflict.
- Guatemala: The Guatemalan government released a statement expressing serious concern about the attacks. It underlined that this circumstance only serves to intensify a conflict that has the potential to go beyond the region and take on global proportions.
- Guyana: UN Permanent Representative Carolyn Rodrigues condemned Israel's attacks on Iran as "against the United Nations Charter" and strongly urged both Israel and Iran to refrain from escalating the conflict.
- Holy See: Pope Leo XIV urged the two countries to engage in discussion and to act with "reason". He further noted that he was monitoring the situation with "great concern".
- Hungary: Foreign Minister Péter Szijjártó informed his Israeli counterpart Gideon Sa'ar that Hungary had a vested interest in restoring peace to the Middle East. He also expressed his wish that the people of the region would return to normal lives as quickly as possible, free from the daily terror and rocket strikes.
- India: Ministry of External Affairs Spokesperson Randhir Jaiswal said India was "closely monitoring the evolving situation, including reports related to attacks on nuclear sites".
- Indonesia: The Ministry of Foreign Affairs strongly condemned Israel's large-scale strike on Tehran, warning that the attack could heighten regional tensions. Spokesman Rolliansyah Soemirat stated that all countries were obligated to resolve disputes peacefully and in line with international law. At the 2025 St. Petersburg International Economic Forum, President Prabowo Subianto remarked that he feared the conflict would worsen, though he hoped that all sides could maintain moderation.
- Iraq: The Iraqi government lamented the failure of diplomatic efforts amid the Iran–United States negotiations and denounced Israel's use of force against Iran as a "flagrant violation of international law and the United Nations Charter", and called on the UNSC to convene immediately. Additionally, Iraq urged the United States to stop Israel from violating Iraqi airspace while attacking Iran, citing bilateral defence agreements between the two countries. Prime Minister Mohammed Shia al-Sudani spoke with Iranian President Pezeshkian and expressed the country's solidarity with Iran "both people and government" and stated that Iraq is committed to peace.
- Ireland: Tánaiste Simon Harris called the attacks "extraordinarily dangerous" and could not have been more terrible. In a televised speech, he also urged all parties to "step back from the brink" and stated that there must be an immediate "de-escalation" in the area.
- Italy: Prime Minister Giorgia Meloni defended Israel's actions as self-defence, calling Iran a major source of instability that, if armed with nuclear weapons, would threaten not only Israel, but the entire Western world. Foreign Minister Antonio Tajani said during meetings with his Iranian counterpart Abbas Araghchi that he wants Iran to avoid a military escalation in the confrontation with Israel, which would be exceedingly harmful for the entire area.
- Japan: Chief Cabinet Secretary Yoshimasa Hayashi said that the government would "continue all-out diplomatic efforts to prevent the situation from worsening", and would "take every possible measure" to protect Japanese expatriates. Foreign Minister Takeshi Iwaya issued a statement strongly condemning Israel's attacks on Iran, calling them "completely unacceptable and deeply regrettable".
- Jordan: Jordan denounced the strikes as a flagrant breach of international law and the UN Charter, as well as a violation of a United Nations member state's sovereignty. Ministry of Foreign Affairs Spokesperson Sufian Qudah cautioned that the incident jeopardises regional security and stability and heightens regional tensions.
- Kazakhstan: The Ministry of Foreign Affairs released a statement voicing grave concern about the attacks and urged that the issue be resolved quickly and solely through diplomatic and political channels in conformity with international law and the UN Charter.
- Kenya: Foreign Affairs Principal Secretary Korir Sing'oei called on Iran and Israel to use moderation and look for a peaceful solution to the current problem that led to the current escalation in accordance with the UN Charter.
- Kuwait: Kuwait denounced the attacks, calling them a threat to regional security, a flagrant violation of Iranian sovereignty, and a breach of all international rules.
- Kyrgyzstan: The Ministry of Foreign Affairs expressed deep concern over the escalation of tensions between Israel and Iran. It urged both sides to exercise utmost caution, refrain from actions that would worsen the situation in the area and find a peaceful solution.
- Latvia: During a meeting, Foreign Minister Baiba Braže noted that Latvia supported the EU's sanctions against Iran to reduce Iran's support for Russia, nuclear program, and hostile regional policies. Additionally, it urged Israel to stop any escalation that would have unanticipated wider repercussions.
- Lebanon: President Joseph Aoun issued a statement saying that the attacks "targeted not only the Iranian people, but also all international efforts to maintain stability in the Middle East and neighboring countries" and "undermine ongoing mediation initiatives that had made significant progress toward achieving realistic and just solutions to avert the threat of war in the region". He also called for "swift and effective action to prevent Israel from advancing its objectives, which he described as increasingly transparent and highly dangerous if allowed to persist".
- Libya: The Government of National Unity strongly criticised the strikes, calling them a "blatant violation" of Iranian sovereignty. It stressed that such acts undermine ongoing efforts to maintain stability in the region and extended its support for de-escalation.
- Lithuania: President Gitanas Nausėda urged both sides to show "restraint" and take immediate measures to "stabilize the situation", while adding that Iran must not be allowed to develop nuclear weapons and that Iran's cooperation with the international community was insufficient. The Ministry of Foreign Affairs provided a similar statement.
- Luxembourg: Foreign Minister Xavier Bettel criticised the timing of the airstrikes, which came "when the USA and Iran are negotiating over the latter's nuclear program", and emphasised that disagreements should be settled diplomatically.
- Malaysia: Malaysia denounced the attacks, stating that they were a major threat to global peace and security and a blatant breach of international law, particularly the UN Charter. It further stated that every effort must be made to prevent the situation from deteriorating, warning that further escalation could destabilise the region and have far-reaching effects worldwide.
- Maldives: President Mohamed Muizzu condemned the strikes and stressed that such aggression violated international law.
- Mauritania: Mauritania strongly condemned the attacks, considering them a violation of Iranian sovereignty and an attack on the Charter of the United Nations. Mauritania also called on the international community to exert pressure to stop these attacks and to work to contain the escalation, stressing that the crises facing the region can only be resolved by political and peaceful solutions.
- Mexico: The Secretariat of Foreign Affairs strongly condemned the strikes, stating that they posed a major threat to the civilian population and regional stability. It also highlighted Mexico's commitment to peace.
- Moldova: The Ministry of Foreign Affairs emphasised that Moldova was concerned about the attacks. It further stated that Moldova agreed with the international community's demands for an urgent reduction in tensions.
- Namibia: President Netumbo Nandi-Ndaitwah accused Israel of breaking international law following the attacks. She also urged moderation and diplomacy while restating Namibia's adherence to international law, peaceful cohabitation, and sovereignty.
- Nepal: Nepal expressed serious concerns about the latest escalation of hostilities. The Ministry of Foreign Affairs advised both Iran and Israel to avoid further escalation and instead engage in conversation through diplomatic channels to promote peace and regional stability.
- Netherlands: The Dutch cabinet expressed concern about the attacks, with Prime Minister Dick Schoof calling it "alarming" and encouraging everyone involved to "maintain calm and refrain from further attacks and reprisals".
- New Zealand: Prime Minister Christopher Luxon said the strikes were "a huge concern", while Foreign Minister Winston Peters called for de-escalation.
- Nicaragua: Co-president Rosario Murillo condemned the attacks as "cowardly" and said that they "[violate] all laws and norms of coexistence as well as international treaties".
- Nigeria: Nigeria denounced the attacks, stating that they had significantly increased Middle Eastern tensions and posed a threat to international peace and stability. The Ministry of Foreign Affairs Spokesperson, Kimiebi Ebienfa, conveyed Nigeria's profound worry, asking both sides to exercise extreme caution for the sake of regional and international peace.
- North Korea: The Ministry of Foreign Affairs Spokesperson described the Israeli strikes on Iran as an "illegal act of state-sponsored terrorism" and stated that "the aggressive forces who brought a new war to the Middle East will never evade the responsibility for destroying global peace". They also warned the United States and several European countries against "fanning up the flames of war".
- Norway: Foreign Minister Espen Barth Eide criticised the attacks, saying they violated international law, exacerbate regional tensions, and endanger global security.
- Oman: Oman, which was due to host talks between Iran and the US, blamed Israel for the attacks and their consequences.
- Pakistan: Prime Minister Shehbaz Sharif condemned the attacks and supported Iran's right to self-defence. He also called on the United Nations to take "urgent steps" to prevent any further escalations. Deputy Prime Minister and Foreign Minister Ishaq Dar echoed Sharif's position. The Ministry of Foreign Affairs condemned Israel's attack and affirmed Iran's right to self-defence under Article 51 of the UN Charter.
- Papua New Guinea: Foreign Affairs Secretary Elias Wohengu stated that Papua New Guinea "stands in solidarity with the people of Israel during this time of uncertainty and conflict" and called on Papua New Guineans to "uphold the State of Israel in prayer".
- Paraguay: The Ministry of Foreign Affairs issued a statement calling for regional peace while reaffirming its strong support for Israel and its right to self-defence.
- Peru: The Peruvian government expressed profound concern over the attacks, which endanger international peace and violate international law. It urged all sides to refrain from further escalation, warning that it could have unforeseen consequences for regional stability and global security.
- Philippines: The Department of Foreign Affairs expressed "grave concern" regarding the attacks. Foreign Affairs Spokesperson Maria Teresita Daza urged the countries involved to de-escalate and seek peace. New warnings were released by the Philippine embassies in Iran, Iraq, and Israel, asking Filipinos to stay vigilant and stay out of public areas.
- Poland: Interior Minister Tomasz Siemoniak said Poland was monitoring Israel's military action in cooperation with its allies "primarily from the standpoint of Poland's security interests and Polish citizens residing in the Middle East". Minister of National Defence Władysław Kosiniak-Kamysz did not anticipate any action by the Polish troop contingents in Lebanon and Turkey. Prime Minister Donald Tusk referred to the attacks to justify scaling up domestic arms production.
- Portugal: Presidential candidate Luís Marques Mendes urged Europe to take decisive action to prevent such attacks, which he described as "a completely gratuitous, profoundly unnecessary, and above all, very dangerous intervention in a very sensitive area of the world".
- Qatar: Qatar strongly condemned the Israeli strike on Iran, stating that it was a blatant infringement of Iran's security and sovereignty as well as a violation of international law. It reaffirmed its unwavering stance against all forms of violence and urged moderation to prevent escalation, which would broaden the conflict's scope and jeopardise regional peace and stability.
- Romania: The Ministry of Foreign Affairs expressed deep concern about the attacks. It further stated that diplomatic measures are necessary to provide a negotiated and verifiable solution to the Iranian nuclear programme based on the non-proliferation principle and to prevent future escalation. It reaffirmed Israel's right to self-defence and national security.
- Russia: Presidential spokesman Dmitry Peskov said: "Russia is concerned by and condemns the sharp escalation in tensions". President Vladimir Putin held talks with both Iranian president Masoud Pezeshkian and Israeli prime minister Benjamin Netanyahu, condemning the Israeli strikes and offering mediation between the two countries.
- Saudi Arabia: The Ministry of Foreign Affairs condemned the "heinous" attacks by Israel against Iran, calling them a violation of international laws and norms.
- Senegal: The Ministry of Foreign Affairs strongly condemned the move, describing it as "aggression" and a "violation of international law", as well as a "serious threat to international peace and security".
- Serbia: President Aleksandar Vučić expressed concern that the attacks might lead to economic instability, political volatility, and global unease. He also added that all he wanted was "for this to be over as quickly as possible".
- Singapore: The Ministry of Foreign Affairs issued a statement expressing serious concern about the region's escalating tensions. It called on all parties to the confrontation between Iran and Israel to use moderation and to defuse the situation.
- Slovenia: President Nataša Pirc Musar blamed Israel for "escalating" the situation. Deputy ambassador to the UN, Ondina Blokar Drobič, expressed profound concern about the Israeli strike on Iran and the country's response during a Security Council meeting on Friday.
- Somalia: The country was one of the 21 Arab and Muslim nations that signed an Egyptian-led statement condemning the Israeli attacks on Iran.
- South Africa: The Department of International Relations and Cooperation stated that South Africa was deeply concerned about the attacks, which raise serious concerns under international law, including the principles of sovereignty, territorial integrity, and civilian protection enshrined in the UN Charter and international humanitarian law. Additionally, it called for the immediate intensification of diplomatic efforts to defuse tensions and advance stability in the Middle East and asked all parties to exercise the utmost moderation.
- South Korea: A Ministry of Foreign Affairs Spokesperson stated that the government expressed its deep concern over the attacks and denounced any actions that worsened the situation. It called on all involved parties to exercise the utmost caution and reduce regional tensions.
- Spain: The Spanish government denounced the attacks and called on the parties to exercise restraint and put an end to the violence right away. It reaffirmed Spain's dedication to Middle Eastern stability and its intention to continue working with its allies to achieve enduring peace in the region.
- Sri Lanka: Ministry of Foreign Affairs called on both countries to prioritise diplomacy and communication to defuse the growing tensions between Iran and Israel.
- Sudan: The Ministry of Foreign Affairs condemned the attacks on Iran, stating that they "constitute[d] a serious threat to international peace and security".
- Sweden: Foreign Minister Maria Malmer Stenergard stated that the strikes were a "very serious situation in a region that is already tense and unstable" and that they urged "all parties to de-escalate".
- Switzerland: Federal Councillor Ignazio Cassis remarked that Switzerland was profoundly worried about the attacks, and urged all sides to use extreme caution and abstain from any behavior that would exacerbate tensions.
- Tajikistan: The Ministry of Foreign Affairs criticised Israel's military operations against Iran and expressed grave concern over the situation's escalation. It emphasised that the only legitimate means of resolving disputes in the region is through conversation and negotiations.
- Thailand: Ministry of Foreign Affairs Spokesperson Nikorndej Balankura expressed deep concerns about the growing conflict and its consequences. He stated that "Thailand urges all parties to exercise maximum restraint to prevent further deterioration of the situation, which would inevitably harm innocent civilians".
- Tunisia: Tunisia vehemently denounced the attacks and the egregious assault on Iran's security and sovereignty, which violated the UN Charter and all international rules and standards and threatened the foundations of peace, security, and stability both regionally and globally.
- Turkey: The Ministry of Foreign Affairs condemned the attacks on Iran "in the strongest possible terms" saying that "Israel does not want issues to be resolved through diplomatic means". On 18 June, President Recep Tayyip Erdogan stated that Iran is engaging in "legitimate self-defence" against what he called "state-terrorism" by Israel; he further added that "Israel, which possesses nuclear weapons and does not recognise any international rules … did not wait for the negotiations to end but carried out a terrorist act without waiting for the result".
- Turkmenistan: Turkmenistan expressed concerns about the deteriorating regional situation, stating that it "rejects the use or threat of force as a means of resolving political or other issues", and advocating for peaceful solutions based on the UN Charter and globally recognized principles.
- Ukraine: The Ministry of Foreign Affairs expressed alarm over the attacks, warning that continued hostilities could harm international security and global financial stability, particularly in the oil markets. Furthermore, the government advised its citizens to leave Israel and Iran.
- United Arab Emirates: The United Arab Emirates denounced the strikes, and expressed great concern about the current escalation and its implications for regional security and stability. The Ministry of Foreign Affairs emphasised the importance of exercising a high degree of restraint to reduce risks and prevent the conflict from worsening.
- United Kingdom: Prime Minister Keir Starmer urged "all parties to step back" and "return to diplomacy". Foreign Secretary David Lammy called the situation a "very dangerous moment". Chancellor of the Exchequer Rachel Reeves reportedly suggested that the UK will assist in Israel's protection. Yet, according to reports, the UK had no plans to defend Israel from retaliation by Iran. Later the same day, Starmer said the UK has "long held concerns" about Iran's nuclear programme, and that he "absolutely recognize[d] Israel's right to self-defence". At the same time, he stressed the need for "de-escalation". Starmer reiterated those messages during a phone call with Israeli Prime Minister Netanyahu. On 14 June, the UK began relocating fighter jets to the Middle East as a "contingency" measure, according to PM Starmer, who also hinted it could involve defensive support for Israel. On 15 June, the UK began advising against all travel to Israel.
  - Conservative leader of the opposition Kemi Badenoch declined to condemn the attacks, emphasising that "Iran is an enemy of the UK" and had attempted terrorist attacks "on UK soil". She added, "If Israel is stopping Iran from getting nuclear weapons, they should not be condemned for that".
  - Reform UK leader Nigel Farage supported the Israeli strikes, calling them a response to "the total failure of the deal struck a decade ago". He said the Iranian regime is close to developing nuclear weapons and aims to "wipe Israel and its people off the map", asking, "who can blame Israel for trying to stop this?" He added that the Iranian people "deserve better than the current brutal regime", indicating his support for the Iranian opposition.
  - Speaking on behalf of the Green Party, MP Ellie Chowns expressed alarm at Israel's "targeted assassinations and widespread bombing of Iran", denouncing Israel as "a rogue state operating outside international law". She demanded that the government clarify whether it knew of the attacks in advance, and cease all military support for Israel, while calling for "a multilateral diplomatic process to look to address Iran's growing nuclear threat".
  - Scotland: First Minister John Swinney warned that the "conflict with Iran has the potential to escalate to a very dark place" and that "the international community and the United Kingdom Government particularly have got to marshal their efforts to constrain Israel and to de-escalate this conflict, both in Gaza and between Israel and Iran... [and] the sooner that happens, the better".
  - Wales: First Minister Eluned Morgan stated "it's very concerning to see how that instability could spiral out of control". She added that "the implications are grave not just for the Middle East but for us as well. There will be a knock-on effect, for example on the price of petrol... We are not immune from what's happening in the Middle East. This is a very concerning situation and comes on top of the difficult situation in Gaza, which is completely unacceptable".
  - The British Foreign Secretary described Iran's Islamic Republic as the greatest threat to global security.
- United States: President Donald Trump praised the Israeli strikes as "excellent" and "very successful", and warned that Iran must "make a deal now" over its nuclear programme or face "even more destructive and deadly military action". He also said there had already been "great death and destruction" and cautioned that future strikes would be "even more brutal". Trump criticised Iran for refusing multiple chances to reach an peace agreement. He further pledged continued military support, and suggested that the attacks were coordinated with the talks he was conducting. Trump authorised US forces to assist in intercepting the initial Iranian missile barrage. The US warned Iran against attacking American interests or personnel, emphasising it would respond militarily if such attacks occurred. On 17 June, Trump stated that a "real end" was better than a ceasefire, and demanded Iran's unconditional surrender. Trump also threatened Iran's Supreme Leader Ali Khamenei, saying that he was an "easy target" and could assassinate him at any moment. The threat came two days after it was reported that Trump allegedly vetoed a plan by Israel to assassinate the ayatollah.

Secretary of State Marco Rubio said that Israel acted independently, stating the U.S. was not involved. He said that Israel informed the U.S. it viewed the attack as an act of self-defence. He warned Iran not to "target U.S. interests or personnel". Senator Rand Paul urged President Trump not to get involved in any war between other countries.
Later, U.S. representative to the UN McCoy Pitt acknowledged that the US had prior knowledge of the attack and had received Israel's justification of "necessary ... self-defence", stating that "every sovereign nation has the right to defend itself, and Israel is no exception".
- Senator Jim Risch warned Iran not to attack the US, saying: "Iran would be foolish to attack the United States". Senator Jack Reed said: "Israel's alarming decision to launch airstrikes on Iran is a reckless escalation that risks igniting regional violence".
- Following the attack, the U.S. forces were repositioned closer to the Middle East.

- Uruguay: The Ministry of Foreign Relations expressed concern about the military escalation, which threatened to exacerbate an already delicate regional situation.
- Uzbekistan: The Ministry of Foreign Affairs issued a statement expressing "serious concern" about the strikes. It urged all sides to exercise the utmost caution, immediately halt all military operations, and turn to diplomatic and political means of resolution.
- Venezuela: President Nicolás Maduro condemned the attacks describing them as a "criminal assault" that "violates international law and the United Nations Charter", he further said "No to war, no to fascism, no to neo-Nazi Zionism" and accused France, Germany, Britain and the US of supporting "the 21st-century Hitler" against the "noble and peaceful Iranian people". Interior Minister and Vice President of the United Socialist Party of Venezuela, Diosdado Cabello, expressed support for the Iranian government and announced a march through the streets of Caracas in support of peace and in protest against Israel's attacks on Iran. Cabello also accused María Corina Machado of advocating for a U.S. military intervention in Venezuela, following her remarks that the Maduro regime posed a serious threat to the Western Hemisphere and the United States because of its close alliance with Iran.
- Vietnam: Ministry of Foreign Affairs Spokesperson Pham Thu Hang stated that Vietnam was deeply concerned about the attacks and strongly condemned dangerous acts of escalation, the use of force, and violations of international law, the United Nations Charter, and national sovereignty. She noted the need to create conditions conducive to peace talks to promote regional and global security, safety, peace, and stability.

=== Others ===
- Kosovo: Acting Prime Minister Albin Kurti stated "The Republic of Kosovo is following with concern the tense situation between Israel and Iran and calls on all parties involved to exercise restraint, in order to avoid further escalation of the security crisis in the region... A diplomatic solution is the right path to addressing security issues, stopping violence, and preventing broader regional and global consequences."
- Northern Cyprus: Prime Minister Ünal Üstel stated "The statements directed at our country and at the President of the Republic of Turkey, Mr. Recep Tayyip Erdoğan, are clear examples of slander and distortion... It is sheer hypocrisy for representatives of a regime that bombs hospitals and schools with warplanes and tramples on the basic right to life to speak in the name of morality and law."

=== Non-state actors ===
- Hamas: Hamas condemned the attack as a "brutal aggression that constitutes a flagrant violation of international norms and conventions", adding that it "reflects the extremist Netanyahu government's insistence on dragging the region into open confrontations." They further called for "a unified stance to deter" Israel and "put an end to its crimes."
- Hezbollah: Hezbollah condemned the attacks but said that it would not launch an attack on Israel. On 19 June, Secretary-General Naim Qassem condemned the attacks and stated that Hezbollah is "not neutral" and stands with Iran, further stating that Trump's suggestion that the US could assassinate Ali Khamenei is an "aggression" against all the people of the region. Qassem also stated that Hezbollah will "act as we see fit in the face of this brutal Israeli-American aggression."
- Houthis: The Houthis condemned the attacks and said they "support Iran's right to defend itself." The Houthi movement also threatened to break its May 2025 ceasefire with the United States and attack U.S. targets "in the event that the Americans become involved in the attack and aggression against Iran alongside the Israeli enemy."
- Kata'ib Hezbollah: Kata'ib Hezbollah leader Abu Ali al-Askari vowed to attack U.S. bases if the United States entered the war in support of Israel, stating "should the United States enter into this war, the deranged Trump shall forfeit all the trillions he dreams of seizing from this region. Operational plans have been established for that purpose."
- Harakat Hezbollah al-Nujaba: HHN leader Akram Kaabi directly threatened American diplomats, citizens, and interests in response to threats to assassinate Khamenei, stating "Perish in your disgrace and eat dirt, you criminal Trump! Who are you to threaten a pillar of the Islamic nation with death?"
- Asa'ib Ahl al-Haq: AAH reaffirmed its allegiance to Khamenei and warned the United States of "the consequences of joining its Zionist ally in the aggression against Islamic Iran."

=== Advisories and evacuations ===
India moved citizens outside major cities, while over 100 were evacuated via Armenia. Citizens of various countries also evacuated via Azerbaijan and Turkmenistan. The US State Department's virtual embassy in Iran (Note: The US maintains a physical consular presence in Tehran at the Swiss Embassy.) also added Turkey as another evacuation option, but with caveats of concern. The Ministry of Foreign Affairs of Taiwan raised the travel warning for Iran to red and Israel to orange. Additionally, Taiwan supported 14 citizens to leave Israel.

The Kosovan Ministry of Foreign Affairs and Diaspora and the Embassy of the Republic of Kosovo in Israel, advised "all citizens of Kosovo currently in Israel to avoid unnecessary travel and stay in safe places". Trinidad and Tobago advised its citizens to exercise extreme caution.

New Zealand's Defence Minister Judith Collins and Foreign Minister Winston Peters announced that they would send a C-130J Super Hercules into the Middle East to evacuate New Zealanders in Iran and Israel.

=== Protests ===
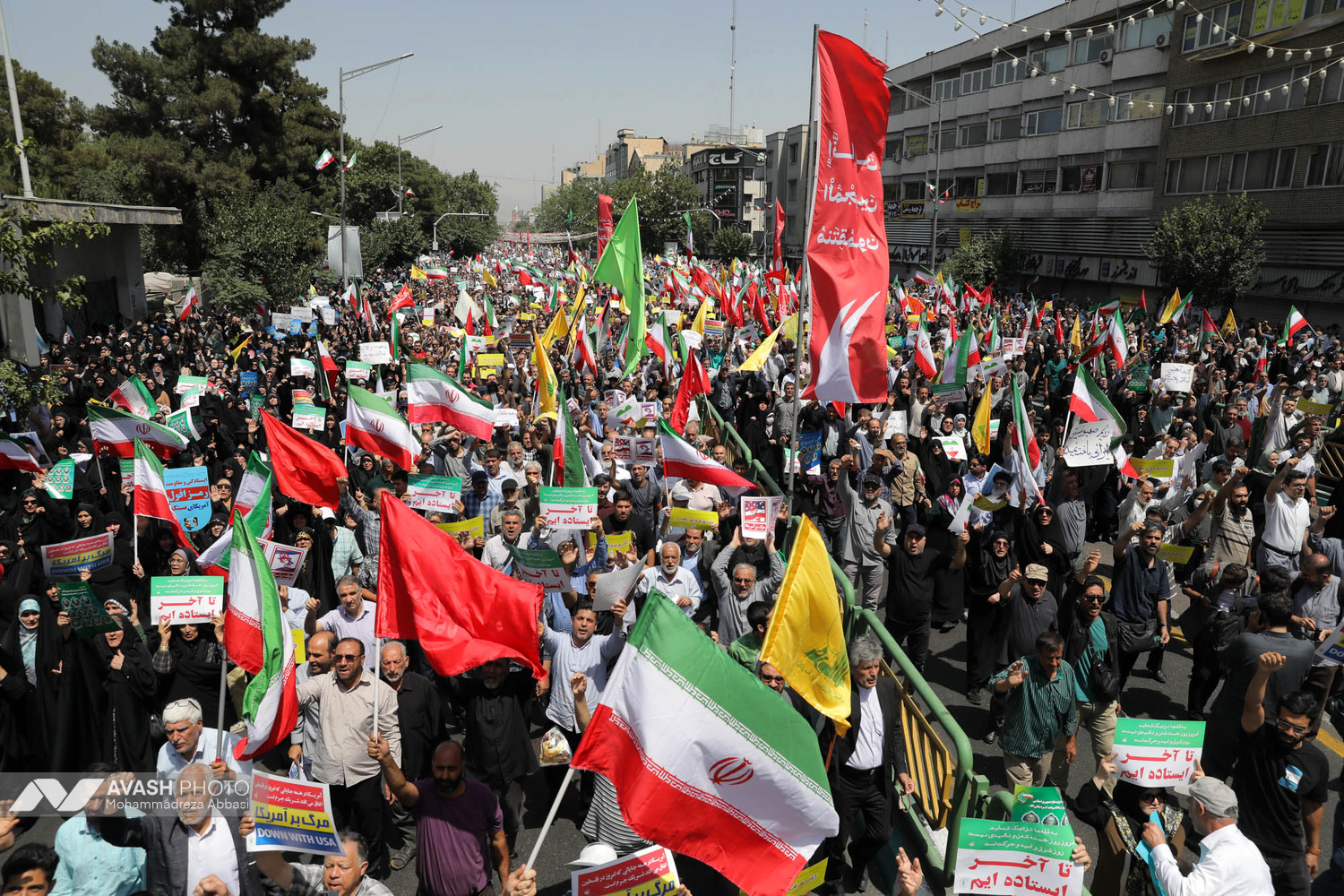
Protest in Tehran against Israeli attacks, 20 June 2025

Protests took place on 14 June in London's Parliament Square, with protestors waving Palestinian and Iranian flags urging the British government to halt military support for Israel as well as calling for a de-escalation of wars in the Middle East.

Small protests also took place in several cities in the US, urging the Trump administration not to join the military action, including in Washington D.C., in front of the White House, where smaller numbers of counter-protesters gathered to try to disrupt the event. Anti-war protests also appeared in Times Square, New York City and Boston with protesters carrying signs against US intervention.

Tens of thousands of Iraqis gathered during Friday prayer in Sadr City in support of Iran and chanted anti-US slogans.

During Friday prayer, people gathered in southern Beirut in support of Iran, waving the flags of Iran, Palestine and Hezbollah.

An anti-NATO protests in The Hague shifted its focus to Iran during the US strikes on Iran, the protests originally planned to be against NATO's military policies military policies pivoted to condemnation of the US attacks on Iran, over 5,000 protesters went to Peace Palace, home to the International Court of Justice, and carried banners calling for de-escalation, diplomacy, and for NATO to be disbanded, with some saying "No Iran War" and "Hands off Iran".

Al Jazeera reported that hundreds of thousands of people attended protests against Israeli strikes that were held at the cities of Tehran, Tabriz, Shiraz, Isfahan, Mashhad, Qom, Qazvin and Yazd as well as in Gilan province. Footage showed them waving Iranian and Hezbollah flags and photographs of assassinated Iranian commanders and Khamenei. Among the participants were Chief Justice of Iran Gholam-Hossein Mohseni-Eje'i, former IRGC commander Major General Mohammad Ali Jafari, as well as several ministers and the deputy speaker of parliament.

=== Public opinion ===
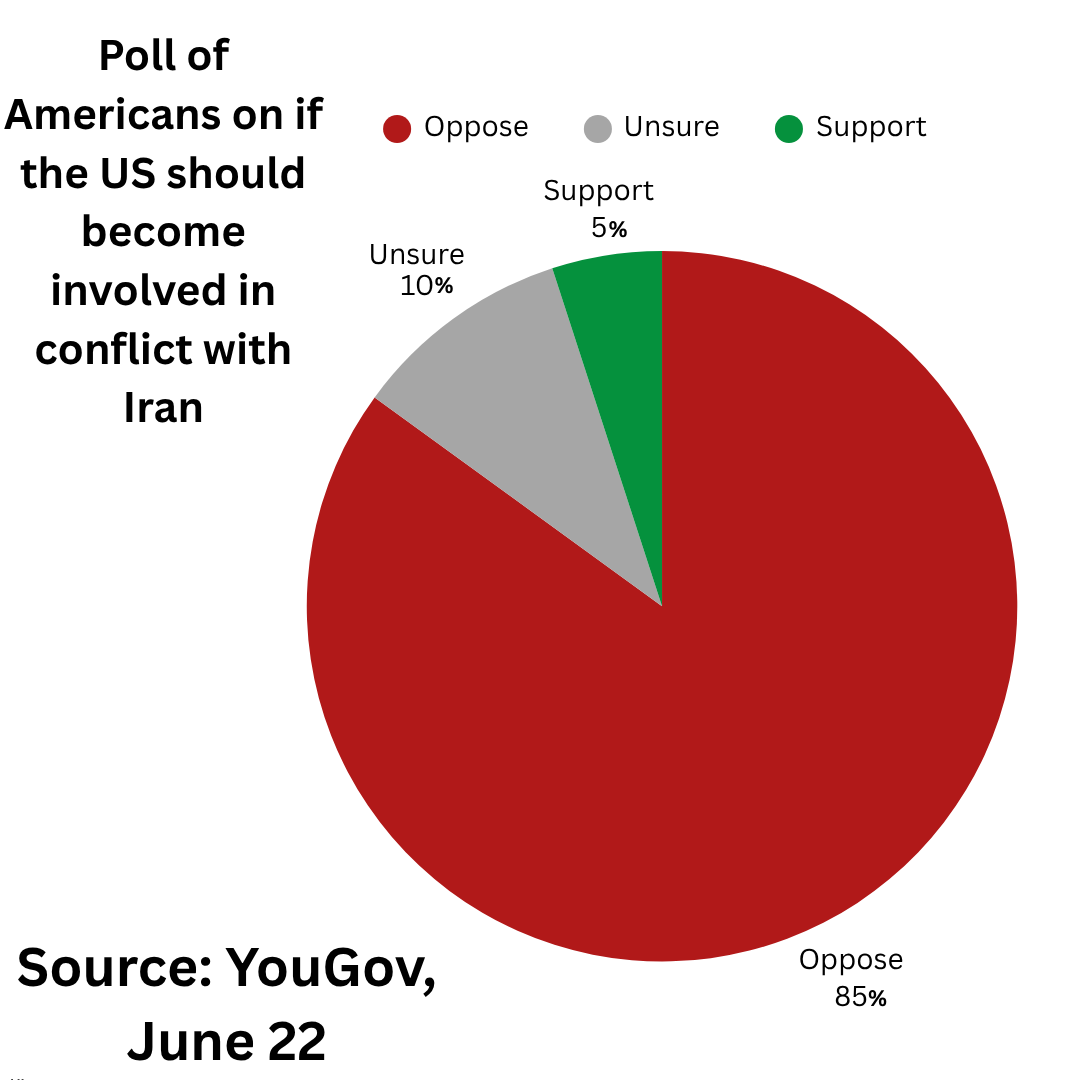
Opinion polling of Americans on US involvement in the Twelve-Day War

On 14 June, several pro-Palestine and pro-Iran demonstrators marched through the streets in London and gathered in Parliament Square waving Palestinian and Iranian flags as well as chanted "stop bombing Iran". Protestors demanded an end of the bombing in Iran and Gaza and urged the government to halt military support to Israel. Some supporters of Trump in the United States have criticized Trump's support for Israeli strikes against Iran, and the possible involvement of the United States in the war. In a poll of Trump voters conducted prior to the onset of U.S. intervention, 53% said the country should not get involved in the Iran–Israel conflict. US intervention into the war would cause many social media accounts to post Internet memes about World War III. Opinion polling on Americans on US involvement in the war by YouGov found 85% of those surveyed were opposed to the war, while 5% supported and 10% were unsure of it.

== Analysis ==
=== Institutes ===
Muhanad Seloom of the Doha Institute for Graduate Studies suggested that, while "bruised severely", Iran was unwilling to risk a wider conflict with the U.S. and its European allies, saying its limited response to date was "below the threshold" of all-out war and indicated a willingness to reenter nuclear negotiations; he also noted that Israeli airstrikes had not completely destroyed Iranian nuclear facilities. A few days later, National Iranian American Council president Jamal Abdi concurred, noting that, while refraining from striking U.S. forces, Iran has refused to abandon the Non-Proliferation Treaty, evict inspectors, or blockade the Strait of Hormuz.

The New Lines Institute described Israel's strikes as "a dangerous escalation against the backdrop of the war in Gaza" and noted that the conflict with Iran is complicating Gaza ceasefire negotiations. The Atlantic Council experts cited reporting from Gaza where civilians fear the Israel–Iran war will distract from the starvation and killing of Palestinians. Al Jazeera reported that as attention turns to Iran, Israel has escalated violence against Palestinians in Gaza and the West Bank, quoting human rights researchers warning the conflict is being used to intensify repression while international scrutiny is diverted.

A report by the Institute for the Study of War (ISW) concluded that Israeli operations forced the Iranian government to accept the truce, allowing Israel to achieve a key objective, despite strikes being limited to imposing costs on resistance rather than reflecting an effort to topple the regime; supporting this, the report observed that Israel did not systematically target domestic security on a nationwide basis, largely focusing on installations in the Iranian capital Tehran. Instead, Israel sought to "demonstrate a credible threat" to the regime should it decide to resume or expand its campaign, the report determined. Citing an estimate by the Institute for Science and International Security, the ISW assessed Iranian enrichment abilities as having been severely curtailed by American and Israeli strikes, calculating that "the loss of so many centrifuges and facilities" would impede nuclear activities for the foreseeable future. The ISW also reported that Israeli interdictions and attacks on launchers reduced the volume of ballistic missile assaults on Israel, forcing Iran to rely on "much fewer" and "smaller" barrages; these Israeli efforts further compelled Iran to submit.

=== Iranian preparedness ===
Iranian leaders anticipated the possibility of hostilities if nuclear negotiations with the United States stalled, but miscalculated the timing of any such engagement, The New York Times reported, citing officials close to the leaders who said Iran had not expected an Israeli offensive before the next scheduled round of talks in Oman, and therefore dismissed warning signs as psychological operations aimed at securing diplomatic leverage. This misjudgment led to a failure to implement defensive protocols that had been previously discussed. High-ranking military personnel, including senior commanders of the IRGC, ignored directives to disperse or shelter, resulting in the deaths of key figures during targeted strikes on military facilities, most notably in Tehran.

=== Legality ===
The International Commission of Jurists released a statement saying "Israel's attack on Iran violates international law, threatening peace and security" and calling on "Iran and Israel to comply with their non-proliferation obligations and ensure IAEA's access to all their nuclear facilities". Marko Milanović, Kevin Jon Heller and Sergey Vasiliev, all scholars of international law, have described these attacks as a crime of aggression. EBS University Wiesbaden professor of international law Matthias Goldmann said that the requirements for legal self-defense are "rather strict": "They require an imminent attack that cannot be fended off in any other way. If you apply that requirement, you come to the conclusion that there was no attack imminent from Iran." He said: "My impression is that the majority of legal analysts see [Israel's attack] as a case of 'prohibited self-defense'." Writing in the European Journal of International Law, Marko Milanovic, Professor of Public International Law in the UK, stated, "To conclude, even if the broadest possible (legally plausible) understanding of anticipatory self-defence was taken as a correct, Israel's use of force against Iran would be illegal. This is because there is little evidence that Iran has irrevocably committed itself to attacking Israel with a nuclear weapon, once it develops this capability." Goldmann said that the Cold War doctrine of mutually assured destruction demonstrates that possession of nuclear weapons in itself cannot be considered an imminent attack. Deutsche Welle noted that Israel itself possesses undeclared nuclear weapons.

In 2012, there had been differing positions regarding a potential attack against Iran over its nuclear programme, which were summarised by law professor Andrew Garwood-Gowers, who said that "the notion of preemptive self-defence against remote threats has no basis in current international law", and concluded that "from an international law standpoint, a unilateral military strike against Iran would be illegal". He noted that Israel's 1981 attack on an Iraqi nuclear reactor was widely condemned at the time, including by the United States.

The Turkish government said that the Israeli action "constitutes a blatant violation of international law". The Israeli Ambassador to the UN commented that "This was an act of national preservation. It was one we undertook alone, not because we wanted to, but because we were left no other option". Iranian President Masoud Pezeshkian has been supportive of talks with the United States to revive the agreement Iran reached with the US and other world powers in 2015.

=== Media ===
The Jerusalem Post suggested Iran's possible retaliation could entail proxy attacks, ballistic missiles and drones, naval and "asymmetric" threats, attacks on targets based outside the country, conventional armed forces or diplomatic attacks.

According to Foreign Policy, most of the American-allied countries have failed to recognize the danger posed by the Iranian regime which seeks to "leverage American gullibility and caution to Tehran's advantage". Israel, according to the paper, decided to resolve the Iranian threat, deemed "existential" by Israelis and strike the "head of the snake" and end the Iranian threat.

Mohammad Eslami, a researcher at the University of Tehran and head of the Atomic Energy Organization of Iran, suggested that a retaliatory attack was supported by most of Iran's domestic political parties, a near unanimity not seen since the Iran–Iraq War.

According to the Atlantic Council's Daniel B. Shapiro, the attacks by Israel laid bare the weakness of Iran in the aftermath of the 7 October attacks, claiming that Israel has achieved full penetration of Iran and has demonstrated capabilities to strike at targets across much of the country. "Iran has never looked weaker, and its ability to respond meaningfully will be tested", he concluded. Military analyst Richard Kemp argued that Israel "had no choice but to attack," describing Iran as a regime pursuing nuclear weapons and supporting terrorism. With diplomacy exhausted, he warned that inaction would risk allowing a regime with a history of violence to obtain nuclear arms. Kemp called for continued support for Israel and cautioned that renewed negotiations would likely fail, as Iran "would not honour" any deal.

Writing for Al Jazeera English, Imad El-Anis, an international relations expert on the Middle East, pointed to Israel's capability of smuggling drones into Iran and to operate in Iranian airspace signals a marked shift in the balance of power. According to El-Anis, Israel exploitation of these weaknesses is unprecedented in the history of the conflict between the two nations. Al Jazeera's senior political analyst Marwan Bishara argued that Israel was obliterating the recent pragmatic turn in Iran's foreign policy and suggested that Netanyahu had pursued the narrative of Iran as an "existential threat" to Israel since his first cabinet position in the early 1990s.

US diplomat and former Department of State official Thomas M. Countryman called Trump's apparent use of Israeli attacks as a negotiating strategy with Iran "profoundly misguided" and alleged that Netanyahu was hoping for Iran to target American positions in the Middle East and thereby provoke the United States to enter the conflict. According to US nuclear expert Jim Walsh, Israel's attacks could produce the opposite effect to the stated intention in forcing Tehran to pursue nuclear weapons.

Charles Moore, Baron Moore of Etchingham claimed that Israel's strikes reflect lessons from the 7 October Hamas attacks, emphasizing the need to avoid being caught off guard. He described Iran as an "active existential threat" unlike more abstract dangers faced by most nations. Moore suggested that while Netanyahu's approach remains controversial domestically, there is broad Israeli consensus on the threat posed by Iran, which he believes the West underestimates. Hamid Gholamzadeh, director of Tehran's Diplo House think tank, Ali Akbar Darani, a researcher at the Center for Strategic Studies in Tehran and Abas Aslani, a senior researcher at the Center for Middle East Strategic Studies, suggested that Israeli attacks on Iranian energy and other sites have failed to create domestic unrest and the possibility of a regime change and instead united the population, even the ones that opposed the ruling government, with Darani stating: "I have rarely seen such national unity".

In an interview with BBC Persian, political analyst Mojtaba Najafi criticized the lack of national unity in the face of external threats. He argued that the Iranian establishment's suppression of public expression had weakened internal cohesion, stating: "One of the reasons Israel dared to attack was Iran's internal problems. ... Unresolved crises and deep anger have distorted the meaning of nationhood in Iran, allowing a foreign force to attack without fear." According to The Economist that the Iranian regime was facing internal discontent and external pressure. It reported that some Iranians had celebrated the assassination of key military leaders. It argued that Israel's campaign had exposed the "failure of the regime's military strategy" and raised hopes for an uprising or coup.

Amnesty International warned that Israel's military escalation with Iran should not be allowed to divert global attention from what it called Israel's ongoing genocide against Palestinians in Gaza, its illegal occupation of Palestinian territories, and its system of apartheid. The Daily Star argued that Israel's strikes on Iran are occurring alongside, and politically connected to, its "genocidal policies" in Gaza, enabled by Western diplomatic and military support.

== See also ==
- 2025 Iran internal crisis
