= Killing of Mehdi Abaei and Alireza Karbasi =

2025 killing in Hamadan, Iran

On 30 June 2025, two young Iranian men, Mehdi Abaei and Alireza Karbasi, were shot dead near the city of Hamadan, Iran by Basij forces affiliated with the Islamic Revolutionary Guard Corps. Authorities claimed the shooting took place during a "security operation" targeting suspected drone activity. However, local reports stated that the victims had no political affiliations and were engaged in a routine off-road recreational trip.

Their deaths sparked widespread outrage and led to local protests in Hamadan, including public outcries during their funerals. Mourners shouted slogans such as "Death to the oppressor" and "Iranians will die before accepting humiliation," and sang the patriotic anthem “Ey Iran,” long associated with anti-government demonstrations.

== Background ==
The killing of Mehdi Abaei and Alireza Karbasi occurred during a period of intensified internal repression in Iran by the Iranian government, following the outbreak of the 2025 Twelve-Day War between Iran and Israel. The conflict was reported to have inflicted significant damage on Iran, both militarily and politically. The war had reportedly exposed vulnerabilities in Iran's regional influence and internal stability.

Following the start of the Twelve-Day War, Iranian authorities launched a crackdown across the country, said to be due to national security issues. Many of the arrests (estimated at over 700 individuals) were widely reported by local and international observers as arbitrary detentions, lacking credible evidence and often targeting civilians. The majority of arrests reportedly took place in Tehran.

Simultaneously, the regime expanded the use of internal checkpoints and established a public hotline to report "suspicious behavior." Afghan refugees also became targets of an intensified deportation campaign. These measures were interpreted as part of the state’s broader attempt to reassert control and suppress dissent after its perceived defeat in the war.

== Shooting ==
According to reports by state-affiliated media and local sources, Mehdi Abaei and Alireza Karbasi were shot and killed on 30 June 2025, near the Tareek-Darreh area outside the city of Hamadan. The Fars News Agency, which is affiliated with the Islamic Revolutionary Guard Corps (IRGC), claimed that security forces had opened fire on the young men’s vehicle after it allegedly failed to comply with orders during what authorities called a "drone-related security operation".

The report stated that officers first issued warning shots and then a direct stop order before firing at the car. Local eyewitnesses and family members disputed this account, stating that the young men had been on a recreational off-road trip, a popular weekend activity in the region, and had no political affiliations or involvement in any suspicious activity.

A third passenger, identified as Mohammadreza Saberizadeh, was seriously injured and transported to a hospital. No weapons or drone equipment were found at the scene.

The Armed Forces Judicial Organization of Hamadan confirmed the two deaths and announced that a formal investigation had been launched. The authorities did not disclose the names or ranks of the officers involved. Independent sources reported that the unit responsible belonged to the Basij paramilitary force, which has been accused of past incidents of excessive force against civilians.

== Funeral and protests ==
The funerals of Mehdi Abaei and Alireza Karbasi, held on 3 July 2025 in Hamadan, became large-scale anti-government demonstrations. Mourners chanted slogans such as “Death to the oppressor,” “We will die but not be humiliated,” and “They killed my brother, I will kill those who did it.” Footage shared by Iran International and other outlets showed emotional crowds singing the patriotic anthem “Ey Iran”, a song associated with resistance movements and anti-regime protests in Iran.

Eyewitnesses described mourners as being in grief but also defying the authorities, with some protesters openly blaming the Islamic Republic and the Basij for the killings. In a widely circulated video one woman was filmed shouting "They lied to us... our enemies are right here!”. Another protester was heard saying, “This is not justice, this is murder.”

The protests in Hamadan were part of a broader wave of public anger in Iran following increased domestic repression. demonstrations were largely localized to Hamadan in the immediate aftermath of the funerals, online calls for nationwide protests began circulating on Persian-language social media channels.

Security forces reportedly maintained a visible presence at the funeral site but refrained from violent dispersal during the ceremony itself. However, several local sources suggested that plainclothes officers recorded attendees and that some individuals were later detained.

== See also ==
- Mahsa Amini protests
- Killing of Khan-Bibi Bameri and Lal-Bibi Bameri
