= Public executions in Iran =

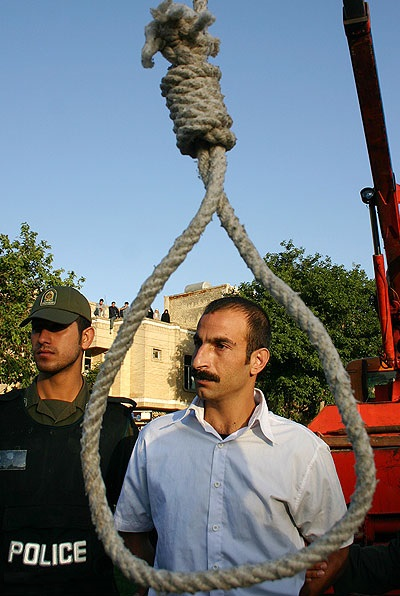
Bank robber Mohammad Bakhshian just prior to his public hanging in 2006

In Iran, public executions occurred regularly during the Qajar dynasty, but declined with the Persian Constitutional Revolution and became a rare occurrence under the Pahlavi dynasty. With the establishment of the Islamic Republic of Iran in 1979, capital punishment and public executions returned on an unprecedented scale. In 2013, Iran was one of only four countries known to have committed public executions.

== Sublime State of Iran (1789–1925) ==
Under the rule of the Qajar dynasty (1789–1925), forms of public execution included hanging, throwing the condemned from the city walls, tying them to the mouth of a cannon and blowing them apart, suffocating them in a carpet, or re-enacting the crime on the criminal. There was also Sham'i ajjin, which entailed making multiple incisions in the body and then lighting candles in the cuts until the person died. Before being brought onto the public scaffold, the condemned was paraded through the bazaar. By 1890, public hanging replaced more exotic forms of execution. Whereas the failed assassin of Naser al-Din Shah in 1850 died by Sham'i ajjin, and then had his body quartered and blown from cannons, the assassin of Naser al-Din in 1896 was publicly hanged. Judicial reform came with the Persian Constitutional Revolution. In 1909, executions were restricted to hanging and firing squad.

== Imperial State of Iran (1925–1979) ==
Judicial reform progressed in the late 1920s after Rezā Shāh consolidated Pahlavi rule (1925–1979). Executions largely occurred away from public view, and capital punishment was primarily restricted to murder, high treason, and armed rebellion. One rare public execution during this period was the hanging of the doctor of Tehran's Central Jail shortly after Reza Shah was deposed. The doctor and three others were found guilty of murdering political prisoners.

== Islamic Republic of Iran (1979–present) ==
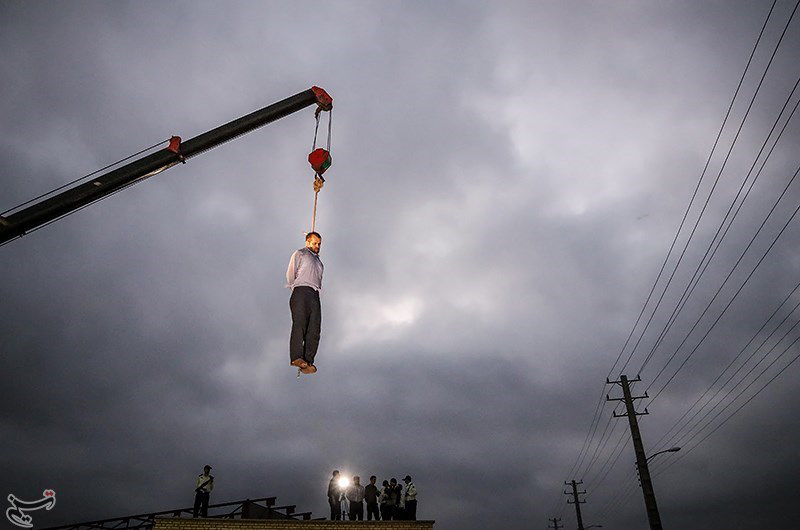
Public execution of serial killer Esmail Rangraz

Following the Islamic Revolution of 1979 and the establishment of the Islamic Republic, public executions became commonplace. The overwhelming majority of public executions were carried out by hanging. Often cranes mounted on trucks served as makeshift gallows. The condemned, and in some cases multiple prisoners, generally stood on a platform before a crowd in a stadium or square. The prisoner was lifted high off the ground by crane, with the rope around their neck, leading to a slower death by strangulation. In other instances, the condemned was placed standing on a stool, which was then abruptly removed, leaving the individual to suffocate to death but barely dangling off the ground. According to a 1990 Amnesty International report, "Flogging prior to execution is relatively common."

In some provincial towns, traditional forms of execution, such as stoning, were revived for moral offenses. At stonings, spectators are encouraged to participate by throwing stones at the condemned. In 1990, Amnesty International "recorded the first executions carried out by beheading in modern times in Iran."

In cases of murder, the guardian or a family member of the victim has the right to perform the public execution or hire another person to do it.

Government authorities have generally avoided publicly executing political prisoners because it generates greater domestic and international outcry. Nonetheless, political prisoners have still been publicly executed, in some cases under the pretense of being drug traffickers. In prisons like Evin, political prisoners have been forced to watch or even participate in executions by removing dead bodies. In the 1980s, newly arrived inmates passed rows of hanged prisoners when entering through the main courtyard.

The report by the United Nations Secretary-General on the situation of human rights in Iran for the year 2017 notes that of 4,741 executions between 2010 and 2016, 3,210 were based on sentences issued by Revolutionary Courts in Iran.

== Societal impact ==
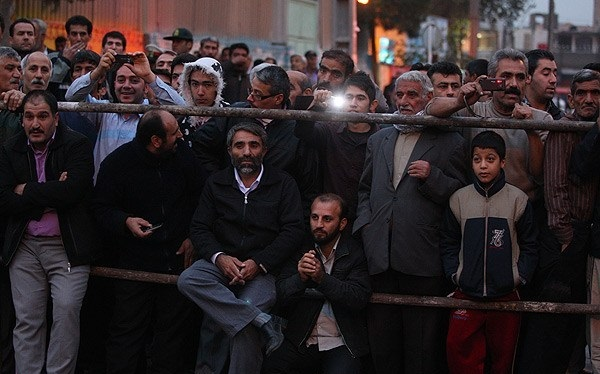
Iranians waiting to view an execution

In August 2013, a 12-year-old Iranian boy from the province of Kermanshah accidentally hanged himself while re-enacting a hanging with his younger eight-year-old brother. According to Radio Free Europe/Radio Liberty, the boy was "an unexpected victim of a culture of public executions that remains pervasive in the Islamic republic." Whenever executions are carried out publicly in Iran, children are often among the spectators. Iranian journalist Mokhtar Khandani said, "In Kermanshah, where I reside, I see in many places that street executions are carried out. At such venues, unfortunately I see a lot of children who are there and witness the scene. In the eyes of some children, it might seem like a game."

An Iranian MP has talked about more executions and more flogging. On 22 December 2018, Aziz Akbarian, chairman of the Parliament’s Committee on Industries and Mines said in an interview with the local Alborz Radio, "If two people are thoroughly flogged and if two people are executed ... it will be a lesson for everyone else."

== See also ==
- Capital punishment in Iran
- Mahmoud Asgari and Ayaz Marhoni
- Execution of Majidreza Rahnavard

== Bibliography ==
- Abrahamian, Ervand (1999). Tortured Confessions: Prisons and Public Recantations in Modern Iran. University of California Press. ISBN 9780520218666.
