= Execution of Majidreza Rahnavard =

Second person executed by Iran for involvement in Mahsa Amini protests (2022)

Majidreza Rahnavard
- Born: 16 June 1999
- Died: 12 December 2022 (aged 23); Mashhad, Razavi Khorasan Province, Iran
- Cause of death: Execution by hanging
- Other name: Majid Reza Rahnavard
- Known for: Second execution in Iran as a direct result of the Mahsa Amini protests; first protest-related execution to be carried out in public
- Criminal charges: Moharebeh ("waging war against God")
- Penalty: Death

Majidreza Rahnavard (Persian: مجیدرضا رهنورد; 16 June 1999 – 12 December 2022) was the first person executed in public for charges stemming from his involvement in the Mahsa Amini protests. Rahnavard was accused of fatally stabbing two Basij militia guards during a protest in November 2022, leading to him being charged with, convicted of, and sentenced to death for moharebeh ("waging war against God"). Rahnavard's execution occurred four days after the first protest-related execution, that of Mohsen Shekari.

== Background ==
Basij militiamen had been sent to Iran's major cities to quell the protests that have arisen out of the death of Mahsa Amini. The militiamen are known to attack and detain protesters. Some protesters had fought back against the Basij. The holy city of Mashhad, Iran's second largest, had been one of the main locales for protests.

== Reported crime ==
Mizan, the Iranian news agency that operates under Iran's judiciary system, claimed that Rahnavard fatally stabbed two Basij "student" volunteers, Hossein Zeinalzadeh and Daniyal Rezazadeh, on 17 November 2022 in the city of Mashhad and wounded four others. Iranian state television networks aired footage of a man chasing another man around a street corner; the man being chased tripped over a motorbike, and the man chasing him proceeded to stab him and flee afterwards. A third man attempted to stop the attack, and the assailant then stabbed the third man to death before fleeing; during his flight from the scene, he allegedly injured four other people, although the footage did not show the four other injuries. Officials claimed the assailant was Rahnavard. The Mizan report did not provide a motive for the alleged attack.

Later, officials claimed, Rahnavard attempted to leave the country. He was arrested two days later, on 19 November.

== Court proceedings ==
On 2 December, Amnesty International said there were 28 Iranians that could face execution. Their list included Rahnavard, who had not yet been sentenced to death but was going through trial proceedings. According to Amnesty, none of the 28 Iranians had fair trials or were afforded the right to choose their own attorneys, to be presumed innocent until guilty, or to receive an open door hearing. The Islamic Revolutionary Court, in which Rahnavard was convicted, has been criticized internationally for holding these "closed doors" trials and for often not allowing defendants to review the evidence that will be used against them.

According to Mizan, the official news agency of the judiciary system in Iran, Rahnavard was charged on 24 November 2022 and faced the Islamic Revolutionary Court in Mashhad on 29 November 2022. He was indicted of moharebeh (an Arabic word translating to "waging war against God").

Human rights activists alleged that Rahnavard showed signs of having been tortured and that he was not given access to any lawyer during his trial. He allegedly had a broken arm wrapped in a cast of heavy bandages because Rahnavard had lion and sun Iranian flag tattoo . Activists and human rights organizations accused Iranian officials of using fabricated evidence and forcing political prisoners like Rahnavard to film staged confessions; after Rahnavard's execution, officials aired heavily edited footage of him in the courtroom confessing to the murders and stating that he hated the Basij militiamen for beating and killing other protesters in clips he saw on social media. Mizan also published edited footage of Rahnavard in the courtroom saying that he made a mistake, disavowing the beliefs that led to the alleged crime, and asking to be punished as soon as possible.

== Execution ==
Following the execution of Mohsen Shekari on 8 December, Amnesty International reported that a senior Iranian police commander had signed a document requesting the public execution of one prisoner connected with the protests "in the shortest time possible," specifically requesting that the execution be public "as a heart-warming gesture towards the security forces."

Rahnavard was publicly hanged from a crane on 12 December 2022. His hands and feet were bound and there was a black bag over his head. According to unconfirmed reports, he was 23 years of age at the time of his execution. The Iranian judiciary posted photos of Rahnavard's execution confirming his death.

== Responses ==
=== Domestic ===
Although the Iranian government tried to prevent a mourning ceremony from taking place, a crowd gathered around his parents' house and chanted against the Islamic Republic. People also sent banners and bouquets to his grandmother's house.

==== Iranian officials ====
After Rahnavard's execution, Razavi Khorasan Judiciary Chief Gholamali Sadeghi thanked the police, security, and judiciary officials for carrying out the death sentence expediently and for "answering public demands for establishing order and security and dealing with rioters and law-breakers."

=== International officials ===
European Union foreign ministers "expressed dismay" at Rahnavard's execution. Josep Borrell, the EU's foreign policy chief, stated that he spoke to Iran's foreign minister following Rahnavard's execution and that it was "not an easy conversation." Borrell also announced the EU's plans to meet in Brussels and approve new sanctions against Iran for their hardline response against the protesters, the executions of Shekari and Rahnavard, and providing drones to Russia for use in the Russo-Ukrainian War. Shortly before the meeting in Brussels, German Foreign Minister Annalena Baerbock called Rahnavard's execution "a blatant attempt at intimidation" of protesters, adding, "We are making clear that we stand beside innocent people in Iran. A system that treats its people in this way cannot expect to continue to have halfway normal relations with the European Union."

France condemned "in the strongest terms the public execution today of an Iranian sentenced to death following his participation in the demonstrations." The United States also issued a statement condemning the execution.

=== Activists and human rights organizations ===
Various Iranian bloggers and activists condemned Rahnavard's execution.

Amnesty International heavily criticized Iranian officials for carrying out Rahnavard's execution. In a statement, their deputy director for the Middle East and North Africa, Diana Eltahawy, condemned the public execution for exposing Iran's judicial system as a tool of repression spreading fear and getting revenge against protestors who go up against the status quo. The statement further criticized Iranian officials for only granting Rahnavard one court hearing and quickly executing him fewer than two weeks later, calling the execution "arbitrary" and they stated that the expedited proceedings exposed the extent "of the Iranian authorities' assault on the right to life and their disregard for even maintaining a façade of meaningful judicial proceedings." Amnesty further called for "the international community" to pressure Iran to cease handing down death sentences and carrying out executions.

Masih Alinejad, a United States-based dissident, called on the European Union to recall their ambassadors in the wake of the execution while saying, "Majidreza Rahnavard's crime was protesting the murder of Mahsa Amini. The regime's method on dealing with protests is execution."

Amnesty International said there were at least 17 other protesters besides Shekari and Rahnavard who were at risk of being executed for various offenses connected to the Mahsa Amini protests. They also said there were at least 21 people against whom Iranian officials were seeking the death penalty.

== See also ==
- Public executions in Iran
- Political repression in the Islamic Republic of Iran
- Capital punishment in Iran
- Human rights in the Islamic Republic of Iran
