= Iran Human Rights =

International human rights organisation

- Founded: July 2005; 20 years ago
- Founder: Mahmood Amiry-Moghaddam
- Type: Nonprofit; International non-governmental organization
- Headquarters: Oslo, Norway
- Location: Global
- Fields: Abolition human rights, protecting human rights defenders, empowering civil society, promoting all human rights for all citizen
- Director: Mahmood Amiry-Moghaddam
- Website: www.iranhr.net

Iran Human Rights (IHRNGO) (Persian: سازمان حقوق بشر ایران) is a non-profit international non-governmental organization focused on human rights in Iran. Founded in 2005, it is a non-partisan and politically independent organisation based in Oslo, Norway. The human rights defender and neuroscientist Mahmood Amiry-Moghaddam is the co-founder and international spokesperson of the organisation.

Iran Human Rights' work is focused on the abolition of the death penalty, supporting human rights defenders, empowering civil society and promoting all human rights for all citizens. As well as reporting on breaches of human rights, IHRNGO also publishes a bi-weekly Persian-language legal magazine called "Hoghooghe Ma", translated to "Our Rights", and airs a television program called "Edam Bas Ast", translated to "Enough Executions".

== Abolition of the Death Penalty ==
Iran Human Rights is one of the NGOs working towards the abolition of the death penalty in Iran. Iran Human Rights has been publishing its annual reports on the death penalty in Iran since 2008. Because of its broad network inside Iran, Iran Human Rights receives reports regarding the death penalty cases which have been carried out secretly or have not been announced by the official media in Iran. Besides reporting on and monitoring the death penalty trends, Iran Human Rights works with the international media to create awareness about the situation of the death penalty in Iran.

Iran Human Rights is an elected member of the Steering Committee of the World Coalition Against the Death Penalty.

=== Cases ===
Navid Afkari: In the case of 27 year-old wrestler and protester, Navid Afkari, IHRNGO published the court documents and the breaches against Navid and his brothers at every stage of their detention and legal proceedings. Their lawyer of choice resigned after being threatened by judicial authorities and replaced by appointed lawyers. In recordings of his trial published by IHRNGO, Navid can be heard defending himself and demanding to see the CCTV footage used as evidence against him. The brothers said they had been tortured and coerced through threats against their family to force them into confessing to what they called lies. IHRNGO refuted the judiciary’s claims after the court documents and evidence were released again on 1 September 2020.

Hassan Afshar: IHR condemned the execution of Afshar, who was executed in July 2016 for allegedly raping another teenage boy when he was 17. Afshar denied raping the adolescent and said that the relationship was consensual. Amiry-Moghaddam stated that Afshar and other Sunni and Kurdish prisoners did not have a fair trial and were tortured during interrogation.

== Human rights defenders ==
IHRNGO publishes an annual report on the situation of human rights defenders in Iran. In its 2019/2020 report, IHRNGO highlighted the situation of 53 human rights defenders who had altogether been sentenced to nearly 400 years of imprisonment and 787 lashes. In an article marking International Human Rights Day, Mahmood Amiry-Moghaddam wrote about the situation of human rights defenders in Iran and said:

Ignoring human rights issues is no longer a viable solution. It is time to call on democratic nations to prioritize a human rights-based foreign policy. Not only because of the values and principles that are the basis of our rights system but because sustainable peace and stability cannot be achieved without human rights.

Amiry-Moghaddam is the founder of Iran Human Rights.

== Protest monitoring ==
=== Aban Tribunal ===
On the anniversary of the 2019-2020 Iranian protests, IHRNGO joined Justice for Iran and ECPM to establish an International People's Tribunal (the Aban Tribunal, in reference to the Iranian month of Aban when the repression took place in Iran at the end of 2019) to investigate the atrocities that were committed during and in the aftermath of the November 2019 nationwide protests on behalf of the victim's families. On its establishment, Shadi Sadr, the Executive Director of Justice for Iran, said: "The establishment of this Tribunal is urgent and necessary. When the international community turns a blind eye to such atrocities, those who know what happened have a moral responsibility to bring about justice and accountability."

=== Mahsa Amini protests ===
In the 2023, Iran Human Rights reported on the detention of the father of Mahsa Amini in the period leading up to the one-year anniversary of her death.

== Magazine ==
Iran Human Rights publishes a bi-weekly Persian-language legal magazine called "Hoghooghe Ma", translated to "Our Rights". Each edition highlights a particular issue.

== Television program ==
IHR broadcasts a Persian language television program titled Edam Bas Ast, translated to "Enough Executions".

== 2024 ==
According to the UN, at least 901 people were executed in Iran during 2024. The report also indicates that at least 40 individuals were executed in a single week in December. This marks an increase in the number of executions compared to 2023. According to latest reports the number is even higher and stands on at least 975, while other reports claim it is over 1000. Human rights organizations have said it is a "horrifying escalation".

== See also ==
- Killing of Nika Shakarami
- Death of Hadis Najafi
- Mahmood Amiry-Moghaddam
- Human rights in Iran
