= Mahmood Amiry-Moghaddam =

Norwegian-Iranian scientist and advocate (b. 1971)

- محمود امیری مقدم
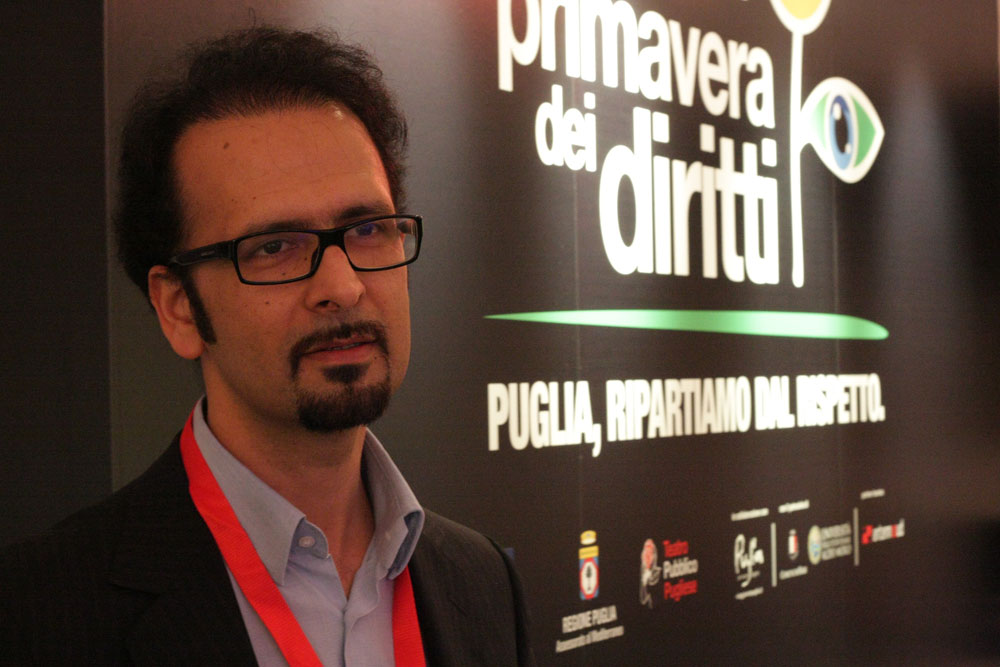
- Born: 21 April 1971 (age 55); Kerman, Imperial State of Iran
- Occupations: Professor and neuroscientist Founder of Iran Human Rights
- Known for: Human Rights activist, neuroscience

Mahmood Amiry-Moghaddam (Persian: محمود امیری مقدم; born 21 April 1971) is a Norwegian-Iranian neuroscientist and human rights advocate. He has held the position of director of the international human rights organization and is the founder of Iran Human Rights.

== Early life ==
Amiry-Moghaddam spent his first few years in the city of Kerman about 1,000 kilometers south-east of Tehran in Iran. He arrived in Norway as a refugee of minor age, via Pakistan in 1985.

Amiry-Moghaddam completed his medical studies in 1996 at the University of Oslo, and later obtained a PhD at the Center for Neuroscience and Molecular Biology in that university. In 2004, he received the King's gold medal for the best medical doctorate at the University of Oslo. Amiry-Moghaddam has been a collaborator to Peter Agre, who received the Nobel Prize for Chemistry in 2003. Amiry-Moghaddam spent one year as a postdoctoral fellow at Harvard Medical School in 2006.

== Career ==
Amiry-Moghaddam was awarded the Anders Jahre Awards medicine prize for young scientists in 2008, He is a member of the Norwegian Academy of Science and Letters.

In 2013, Amiry-Moghaddam was selected by an independent panel as one of the 10 "brightest minds" in Norway. The list was published in the Norwegian newspaper VG.

Amiry-Moghaddam is well known as a defender of human rights. He received the Norwegian Amnesty International's human rights prize in 2007 for his work against the human rights violations in Iran.

Today, he works as a Professor in Medicine and head of the Laboratory of Molecular Neuroscience at the University of Oslo. He is also co-founder and spokesperson for the NGO Iran Human Rights which monitors the violations of human rights in Iran.

== Activism ==
Amiry-Moghaddam began using his voice to raise awareness of the Iranian authorities' human rights violations in 2004, the same year he received the King's Gold Medal for best medical doctorate at the University of Oslo. Before the audience with His Majesty King Harald at the Palace, he told the TV2 online newspaper that he would "thank the King for the medal and for receiving me. I would also like to say a few words about human rights in Iran, and consider giving the King a book about everyone who has fallen for freedom in Iran." Later in 2004, Amiry-Moghaddam's efforts in Norway were decisive for Leyla Mafi escaping the death penalty in Iran.

=== Case of Leyla Mafi ===
Leyla had been forced into prostitution by her family when she was just eight years old. She became pregnant and had her first child when she was nine years old, and gave birth to twins five years later at the age of 14. She was arrested and received 100 lashes each time she gave birth. In addition to being repeatedly raped, Leyla was sold to older men as a sigheh, or temporary bride, twice. She was just 12 years old when she was first sold to an Afghan man. She was sold again when the sigheh expired, this time to a 55-year-old married man with two children. He forced her into prostitution, receiving as many as 15 clients at his home every night.

Arrested at 17, she was sentenced to death on charges of "running a brothel, acts contrary to chastity, prostitution, incest and giving birth to an illegitimate child" in 2004 when she was 18 years old. Several assessments found her to have the mental age of an eight-year-old child. Amiry-Moghaddam persuaded Aftenposten to cover the case of Leyla.

Aftenposten's Per A Christiansen wrote an article about Leyla's case every day. The case received so much attention that after a week, Norway’s then Prime Minister Kjell Magne Bondevik wrote a personal letter to then Iranian President Mohammad Khatemi and asked for Leyla’s death sentence to be revoked. The international pressure forced Leyla's death sentence to first be delayed and she was later released after receiving 99 lashes.

=== Stoning and child death penalty cases ===
Amiry-Moghaddam's activism has helped to create awareness of several death penalty cases in both the Norwegian and international media. He was particularly involved in stoning and child death penalty cases and contributed greatly to international reactions by bringing the cases to the media's attention. In one case, the stoning of a woman and a man was stopped after Amiry-Moghaddam brought the case to the media and wrote a letter to the then-Norwegian foreign minister Jonas Gahr Støre. The man who was later identified as Jafar Kiani was stoned two weeks later but the woman, Mokarrameh Ebrahimi, was saved from stoning.

== Awards and honors ==
Mahmood Amiry-Moghaddam was awarded the Anders Jahre Medical Prize for Young Scientists in 2008. The award was presented by King Harald. Amiry-Moghaddam is also a member of the Norwegian Academy of Science and Letters. He was also listed as one of the 10 smartest minds in Norway by a panel in VG.

Mahmood Amiry-Moghaddam is an active public debater and human rights advocate. He received the Norway Prize, Amnesty International for 2007 for his involvement in human rights violations in Iran.
