= Gender inequality in the Islamic Republic of Iran =

Gender inequality in the Islamic Republic of Iran is the presence of gender inequality in the Islamic Republic of Iran.

== Legal inequality ==
The judicial system in the Islamic Republic is based on Islamic Sharia law, and there are several aspects where men and women do not enjoy equal rights.

=== Mandatory hijab ===
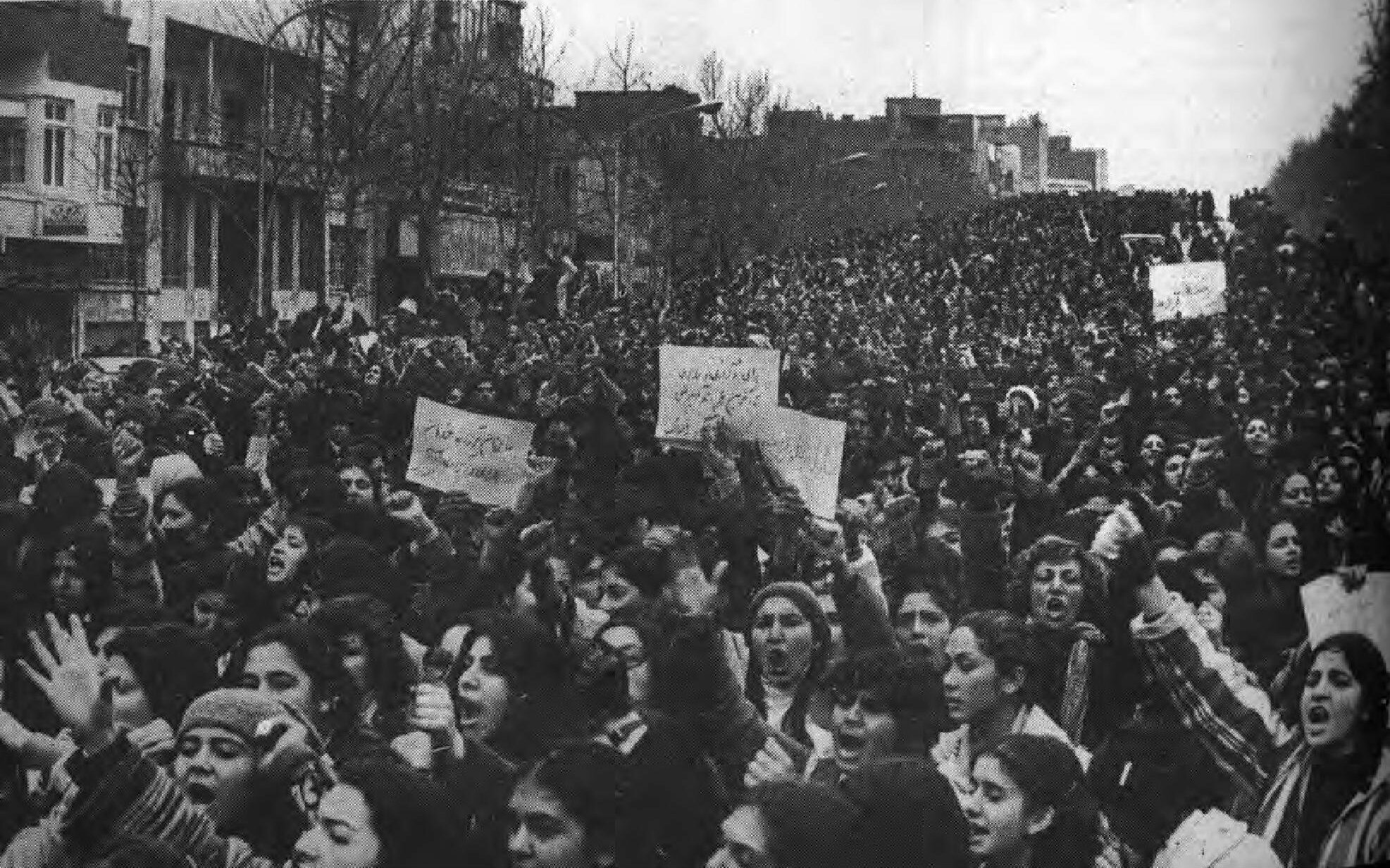
1979 International Women's Day protests in Tehran against mandatory hijab policies. These policies only applied to women in the country, and do not apply to men.

After the Islamic Revolution and founding of the Islamic Republic in 1979, mandatory hijab was enshrined as law. This was in spite of statements made during his exile in France, where he denied any intent to control women's dress code. Ayatollah Khomeini announced that women should observe Islamic dress code. He was supported in his by the conservative/traditionalist fraction of the revolutionaries who were hostile to unveiled women, as expressed in two slogans used during this time: "Wear a veil, or we will punch your head" and "Death to the unveiled". There were also reports that supporters of the revolution attacked unveiled women on the streets.

As the consolidation of power by Khomeini and his core supporters continued, left and liberal organizations, parties, figures, were suppressed and eliminated, and mandatory veiling for all women returned. This began with the "islamification of offices" in July 1980, when unveiled women were refused entry to government offices and public buildings, and banned from appearing unveiled at their work places under the risk of being fired.

=== In Judicial courts ===
In Iran, the witness of one man is equal to that of two women in a judicial court. Supporters justify it on the idea of gender essentialism that makes the testimony of a man more reliable in certain situations, but critics argue that this practice systemically discriminates against women. Financially, blood money payments for a dead woman is half that of a dead man, and a woman's share of inheritance is half that of the share for a man.

=== Activities ===
After the Iranian Revolution in 1979, women were banned from entering stadiums in Iran, with this restriction loosened in 2024. Despite this, women are still given limited access and banned from certain stadiums.

The Islamic Republic also places restrictions against singing. Women are prohibited from riding motorcycles, and it is illegal to issue licenses for this purpose. Women are similarly banned from riding bicycles on the grounds that it is "violating norms" due to a "provocative clothing" style.

Abortion is illegal in Iran, and contraceptives including birth control pills, condoms, and IUDs are also banned in the country.

Iran also has a major gender pay gap and women are paid considerably less than their male counterparts on the labor market.

In addition, women are legally prohibited from leaving the country without permission from their husbands.

== Enforcement resulting in fatalities ==
Zahra Kazemi, a Canadian-Iranian journalist, was arrested in 2003 while reporting on a gathering of prisoners’ families outside Evin Prison. She was arrested on the orders of Saeed Mortazavi against the wishes of the Ministry of Intelligence, and died of a concussion after 18 days in custody. Authorities attributed her death to a head injury and fainting, but this claim has been questioned. Her case was never resolved, and the only defendant was acquitted. Her death caused tensions in Canada–Iran relations.

On 12 September 2022, Mahsa Amini fell into a coma after being beaten by police officers in an Ershad patrol vehicle and in the Vazra detention center. She died a few days later in Kasra Hospital in Tehran after being repeatedly beaten with batons by Ershad patrol officers.

On 21 November 2022, Atefeh Naami, who had participated in the Mahsa Amini protests, was found dead in her apartment on December 25. Government agents placed her body on the balcony of her apartment in the Azimiyeh area of Karaj in a “ suicide scene.” Naami's family has categorically denied that she committed suicide. Despite the obvious signs of assault on her body, security officials ordered her immediate burial. Finally, on 28 November, security agents secretly buried Atefeh Naami's body in Ahvaz in silence despite opposition from her family members.

Nika Shakarami, a teenage protester in the 2022 protests, was abducted by the Revolutionary Guard forces on September 19 of that year. She was tortured, raped, and severely beaten before being murdered, and her body was found 10 days later in Kahrizak. Security forces then abducted her body and secretly buried her. Some reports also indicated that her internal organs were stolen. In April 2024, the BBC reported that it had obtained evidence of her being beaten to death with batons in a refrigerated truck by three Revolutionary Guard officers.
