= Ahoo Daryaei =

Iranian citizen protesting against the compulsory hijab

- آهو دریایی
- Born: 1994 (age 31–32); Iran
- Education: Islamic Azad University; Science and Research Branch, Tehran
- Occupation: Doctoral student
- Known for: Protest against compulsory hijab laws in Iran

Cover of Elle, 14 November 2024

Ahoo Daryaei (Persian: آهو دریایی, romanized: Āhū Daryāyī, pronounced [ɒːˈhuː dæɾjɒːˈjiː]), also known as the Science and Research Girl, is a 30-year-old Iranian doctoral student in French literature at Islamic Azad University, Science and Research Branch, Tehran.

On 2 November 2024, members of the Basij paramilitary tore part of Daryaei's clothing while confronting her over Iran's compulsory hijab laws at the Azad University in Tehran. In response, she removed the remainder of her clothes and sat partially undressed in protest. Soon after, security forces reportedly took her into custody, causing her forced disappearance from public view, probably to be committed to a psychiatric hospital. Observers and human rights activists reject claims that she was mentally unstable, arguing that Iranian authorities often label women protesters as mentally ill to silence them.

Following a domestic and international outcry, Daryaei was released without charge on November 19 after spending time in a psychiatric ward.

Daryaei's action on 2 November 2024 turned her into a symbol of resistance against Iran's strict dress code laws and the enforcement of the compulsory hijab, especially two years after the death of Mahsa Amini. Her protest and subsequent arrest drew international attention, with human rights organisations calling for her release.

== Context ==
Since the nationwide protests in September 2022, sparked by the death of Mahsa Amini, a growing number of Iranian women have been actively resisting the country's mandatory headscarf laws. This movement has seen women publicly removing their hijabs, sharing images and videos on social media, and participating in demonstrations advocating for personal freedoms and women's rights. Despite facing significant risks, including arrests and harassment, these protests of defiance have continued, highlighting a persistent challenge to Iran's strict dress code regulations.

== 2 November 2024 protest and arrest ==
On 2 November 2024, Daryaei became the center of a high-profile protest incident at Tehran's Islamic Azad University. According to witnesses, she was confronted by university security forces and members of the Basij paramilitary for not wearing her headscarf according to the strict dress code.

During the altercation, members of the Basij, a paramilitary group associated with Iran's Revolutionary Guards, allegedly attempted to take the student into custody under the pretext of violating hijab and mask requirements, tearing her sweater in an attempt to enforce the mandated hijab. Political scientist Mahnaz Shirali noted that the altercation escalated when she removed her remaining clothes and sat in her underwear in the campus courtyard as an act of defiance.

She then walked onto the street in her underwear, further protesting against the enforced hijab laws in an act of public defiance. The protest was captured on video by onlookers, and footage quickly circulated on social media, drawing widespread attention both within Iran and internationally.

She was detained in a car by three plainclothes officers. After her arrest, she was reportedly taken by police to Iran Psychiatric Hospital on the Special Road under the orders of the IRGC intelligence and placed under the supervision of a doctor and psychiatrist. According to press research, after obtaining a statement from Daryaeis former husband that she had mentally health problems, the authorities released her after 18 days and put her on mandatory monthly Flupentixol injections.

== Aftermath ==
Amir Mahjoub, the Public Relations Director of Islamic Azad University, on the platform X (Twitter), stated without providing reasons for the conflict between this student and the university's security that "the motives behind and reasons for this student's action are under investigation," though he also claimed that "in the police station and after medical evaluations, it was determined she was under intense mental pressure and suffered from mental disorders."

Video of government response

The government spokesperson, Fatemeh Mohajerani, responded by stating that the government views this as a social, rather than security matter, and claimed that the student is currently undergoing medical treatment. However, it was widely considered that the "medical treatment" explanation was a pretense, because Iranian authorities have a documented history of labeling women who defy compulsory hijab laws as mentally ill, using this as a tactic to suppress dissent.

Daryaei was initially not named and was referred to in the media only as "the Science and Research girl". Around 13 November, she began to be identified in the media as Ahoo Daryaei.

== International reactions ==
- On 2 November 2024, Mahdieh Golroo wrote "The Science and Research Girl has no name; her name is being a woman in Iran. Her name is Nika, Sarina, and Hadis. Her name is Woman, Life, Freedom."
- On 2 November 2024, Mai Sato, the United Nations Special Rapporteur on human rights in Iran, announced that the incident was being closely monitored. She also reposted a video showing this woman in underwear protesting on campus.
- On 5 November 2024, hundreds of Iranians and French people gathered in the evening in the center of Paris, in front of the Pantheon near the Sorbonne University, chanting slogans and giving speeches to support resistance of Iranian women against oppression. Members of both lower and upper French parliaments from the green and left parties were present, but also members of the Femen association and the CGT union.
- On 5 November 2024, Amnesty International called for her "immediate and unconditional release", underscoring the need for an independent investigation into the alleged abuse during her arrest. The National Secular Society called on the UK Government to press Iranian authorities for her release.
- On 10 November 2024, the Global Student Forum (GSF) issued a statement calling for international awareness and action. The GSF highlighted concerns over the treatment of women in Iran who actively resist the country's mandatory hijab laws, specifically drawing attention to the violent measures reportedly taken against her. The GSF urged international human rights organizations and foreign governments to press Iranian authorities for her release and ensure her safety. The GSF statement underscored the symbolic impact of her protest on global discussions about women's rights and state-enforced religious policies.
- On 14 November 2024, video stills of her protest were featured on the cover of Elle magazine.

== See also ==
- Mahsa Amini protests
- Nudity and protest
- Women in Iran
