= Shakarimi =

Shakarimi (Persian: شاکرمی) is a Persian language surname. Notable people with the surname include:

- Jahanshir Shakarami, Iranian entomologist
- Masoud Shakarami (1986), Iranian actor
- Nika Shakarami (2005–2022), Iranian teenage protester who participated in Iran's 2022 nationwide protests
