= Ahoo =

Ahoo may refer to:

- Ahoo Daryaei, an Iranian doctoral student detained for alleged violations of Iran’s compulsory hijab laws
- Jeep Wagoneer (SJ), (also called Jeep Ahoo) a car
