= Death of Hadis Najafi =

Iranian protester killed during Mahsa Amini protests

Murder of Hadis Najafi
- Native name: حدیث نجفی
- Date: 21 September 2022
- Location: Mehrshahr, Alborz province, Iran
- Deaths: Hadis Najafi
- Burial: Behesht-e Sakineh

Hadis Najafi (Persian: حدیث نجفی; January 5, 2000 – September 21, 2022) was an Iranian woman who was murdered after being shot in Mehrshahr, Karaj, during the 2022 Iranian protests following the death of Mahsa Amini. Her death has been widely reported in international media.

== Background ==
Hadis Najafi was born in Karaj on 5 January 2000. She was the fourth child of the family, having three older sisters and one younger brother. Her parents were born in Mianeh in the East Azerbaijan province and were Iranian Azerbaijanis. Najafi had a diploma in fashion design and worked as a cashier at a restaurant in Mehrshahr, Karaj.

Najafi had joined the Mahsa Amini protests of September 2022, which were sparked by the death of Mahsa Amini, who died due to injuries while in police custody. Amini was accused by police of violating the mandatory hijab law, and related demonstrations have shown wide support for increasing women's rights in Iran. Najafi participated in protests in Karaj. Najafi had no known prior engagement in activist causes and had not previously spoken openly on women's rights in Iran. On the night of 21 September, she sent a video to a friend in which she said "I like to think that when I think about this a few years later I'll be pleased I joined the protest." She left her house around thirty minutes before she was killed.

== Death ==
Hadis Najafi is reported to have been shot on Eram Boulevard in Mehrshahr, Karaj, on 21 September 2022, around 8 pm. She was reportedly shot at least six times in the face, hand, neck, abdomen and heart. According to her family, she had been hit by at least twenty bullets. According to the Iranian government, she was shot by protesters with weapons not used by police officers, a claim strongly disputed by Najafi's own family, other activists, and the international media. These parties instead all attributed the shooting to the government-backed security forces. After being shot, Najafi was taken to Ghaem Hospital in Karaj, where she was pronounced dead. The official medical records released claimed that she had died due to a "swelling of the brain".

According to Najafi's mother, her family was not allowed to see her in the hospital after she was shot, being barred from entry by police officers. They were only allowed in after a security guard took pity on them and told them that Najafi's body was in the morgue. Radio Zamaneh published Najafi's death certificate. Images of her injuries and certificate of death were later confirmed by Amnesty International and BBC Persian after contact with her family.

The authorities released Najafi's body to her family for burial on 23 September. According to the family they were pressured by the government to say that she had died of a heart attack. Najafi's father was also reportedly drugged and pressured by security forces to say she died of natural causes.

== Burial and chehellom ==
Najafi was buried on 1 October at the Behesht-e Sakineh cemetery. Security forces were reportedly present during the ceremony. Also present were many women, who lit candles and left roses at her grave. During the funeral ceremony, a picture of Najafi wearing a hijab was used, which later sparked some criticism on social media; her mother later stated that the image was not intentionally selected and that it was the only available image at that moment.

On 3 November, forty days after her death, thousands of mourners tried to attend the chehellom memorial gathering at the Beheshte Sakineh cemetery, but were blocked by government forces, according to witnesses. Hundreds of mourners instead marched on Beheshti Boulevard. Video verified by The Washington Post shows protestors throwing rocks at security forces, and a 17-year-old shot and killed by a member of the security forces. As of April 2023, the government had arrested fifteen people, sentenced five of the arrested to death, and carried out two executions, with the remaining three death sentences under judicial review.

== Reactions ==
Najafi's death was shared on social media by the Iranian-American journalist and activist Masih Alinejad. After Najafi's death a video purporting to show her tying her hair into a ponytail before joining the protests on her last night alive became viral on social media, eventually also being widely shared by international news outlets reporting on her death. The video was later determined to show another woman partaking in the protests after BBC Persian was contacted by the woman who actually appears in the video. This sparked some brief doubts on whether Najafi had actually been killed, though they were quickly quelled with further confirmation. The woman in the video told BBC Persian that she would continue to "fight for the Mahsas and Hadis."

Like Mahsa Amini before her, Hadis Najafi was also turned into a symbol and rallying point for the protests after her death, and remembered for her courage. Her TikTok and Instagram accounts became memorials and received an influx of people who liked and commented on them in her support. There were also widespread tributes in Najafi's honor on Twitter.

Najafi's sister and mother publicly spoke in her support and blamed her death on the Iranian government. Although her father refused to state that she had died of natural causes, he claimed in an interview with government-aligned media that Najafi had "known nothing of politics", stated that he did not believe the police had killed her, and blamed her death on her being influenced by foreign media. Najafi's sister, on the contrary, stated that Najafi had decided to participate in the protests due to having been heartbroken and outraged over the fate of Mahsa Amini.

Omid Nouripour, co-leader of the German political party Alliance 90/The Greens, started a speech in the federal parliament of Germany on 29 September 2022 with describing Hadis Najafi's participation in the protests and her death. Luciano Spalletti, the head coach of Italian Serie A club Napoli, brought two roses in memory of Mahsa Amini and Hadis Najafi to a press conference on 30 September 2022.

== See also ==
- Compulsory Hijab in Iran
- Iranian protests against compulsory hijab
- Death of Nika Shakarami
- Death of Sarina Esmailzadeh
- Atefeh Naami
- Political repression in the Islamic Republic of Iran
- Human rights in Iran
