= Killing of Nika Shakarami =

Protester who died during 2022 protests in Iran

Death of Nika Shakarami
- Date: 20 September 2022
- Location: Tehran, Iran
- Burial: Hayat ol Gheyb
- Suspects: Iranian security forces

On 20 September 2022, 16-year-old Iranian girl Nika Shakarami (Persian: نیکا شاکرمی) vanished in Tehran during the 2022 Iranian protests following the death of Mahsa Amini. She was abducted, tortured, and sexually assaulted by several agents of the Islamic Revolutionary Guard Corps and ultimately murdered. After her body was identified by her family, they planned to bury her in Khorramabad, but the body was allegedly stolen by Iranian authorities and instead buried in Hayat ol Gheyb, reportedly to exercise leverage over her family and to avoid a funeral procession which could cause further protests.

The Iranian authorities denied wrongdoing, spread several contradictory stories concerning her fate, and allegedly coerced some of her family members to support these narratives. Shakarami's death and the attempts of government suppression regarding information on her fate was widely publicized in international media and further fanned the ongoing protests.

Her official cause of death by Islamic republic was later described as blunt force trauma in a Behesh-e Zahra document. An Iranian document leaked to the BBC in 2024 concluded that Shakarami was killed by security forces that had taken her captive, after she fought back while being sexually assaulted by her captors.

Shakarami, Sarina Esmailzadeh and Hadis Najafi, according to media sources, became the new faces of the ongoing protests in Iran, and their pictures appeared on posters that were secretly plastered on the walls in Iranian cities.

== Background ==
Nika Shakarami was born on 2 October 2005 in Khorramabad, Lorestan province, to a Lur family. Little is publicly known of her background. She had family ties to Khorramabad in southwestern Iran, the city having been her father's hometown. She was the second child in the family. Shakarami lived with her aunt in Tehran, the capital of Iran, and worked in a coffee shop. She moved to Tehran after the death of her father.

== Disappearance and death ==
Shakarami participated in the Mahsa Amini protests of September 2022, sparked by the death of Mahsa Amini in police custody and aimed at increasing women's rights in Iran. The riot was called upon by The Covenant (پیمان) and the Neighborhood youth alliance (جوانان محلات ایران) bringing hundreds to Keshavarz Boulevard. Shakarami went missing after protesting on Keshavarz Boulevard in Tehran on 20 September. She had left her house around 13:00 UTC and brought with her a bottle of water and a towel as protection against tear gas. She initially told her family that she was going to visit her sister.

According to Shakarami's family, the last known communication was a message sent to one of her friends in which she said she was being chased by security forces. Apparently, she had been separated from her friends as the protests grew more crowded. Her friends last saw her around 15:00 UTC. On the night of 20 September, Shakarami's Telegram and Instagram accounts were deleted and her phone was turned off. According to CNN, on 12 October, her Telegram account was briefly reactivated, likely by Iranian authorities, and family members confirmed that Shakarami's phone was in the possession of the prosecutor's office in Tehran. Iranian state media also reported that authorities had accessed direct messages on her Instagram account.

On 27 October 2022, CNN released footage of Shakarami's last hours during the protests. In one video she can be seen hiding behind cars in traffic, saying to a driver "Don't move, don't move", implying that she was targeted and had been chased. The person who provided the video to CNN said they saw Shakarami being arrested and put into a police van.

After not hearing from her, Shakarami's family filed a missing person's report and began searching police stations and hospitals. They also posted pictures of her on social media in the hope that someone would recognize her. Ten days later they were informed that someone with similar characteristics had been discovered during forensic examinations of dead protesters and her body was at the Kahrizak morgue, located in a local detention center. Shakarami's family members were not allowed to see the body, only to look at her face for a few seconds for identification purposes. The authorities reportedly informed them that she had died as a result of falling from a great height. They were shown a photograph of her lifeless body at a sidewalk to illustrate this but they found the picture to be suspicious. Shakarami's aunt claimed in an interview that Shakarami's nose had been completely destroyed and that her skull had been "broken and disintegrated from multiple blows of a hard object", perhaps a baton. The family were told that Shakarami had been kidnapped, held, and questioned by the Islamic Revolutionary Guard Corps and had then been detained for a short time at the Evin Prison, a prison which has frequently been accused of systematically raping and torturing prisoners.

An Iranian document leaked to the BBC in 2024 detailed events leading up to and after Shakarami's death. The BBC verified that the document was part of a 322-page case file on anti-government protestors in 2022. (Note: Complete certainty is challenged.) The document stated that Shakarami was taken captive by security forces in an undercover van, sexually assaulted, and fought back, leading to her being beaten to death by batons. It also stated that Shakarami was taken to a temporary police camp and a detention center, but was not admitted into either location. Her captors were instructed to take her to Evin Prison, but dumped her body under the Yadegar-e-Emam highway after reporting her death to the Islamic Revolutionary Guard Corps and receiving new orders. There was no indication that the men responsible for her death were punished, possibly due to their affiliation with the Iranian Hezbollah.

== Burial ==
The family transported Shakarami's body to Khorramabad for burial, intending to hold the ceremony on 2 October, which would have been her seventeenth birthday. The family however claims that security forces pressured them into not holding a funeral ceremony and instead bury her in silence. Shakarami's aunt defied such pressure and posted on Twitter, inviting anyone interested to join the celebration of Shakarami's "last birthday". Shakarami's aunt and uncle were arrested shortly thereafter in their home on 2 October and other family members were threatened that she would be executed if they participated in the protests. The rest of the family were also pressured to agree to not organize a public funeral ceremony.

Despite reaching an agreement that there would be no funeral, Shakarami's family further claim that the authorities then stole Shakarami's body and buried her in Hayat ol Gheyb, about 40 kilometres (25 miles) away, in order to avoid publicity and prevent her grave becoming a pilgrimage site for protesters. Iranian authorities have previously used the bodies of dead protesters to silence their families.

Images of Shakarami's tombstone show this poem carved on it: "Gave birth to you with blood and pain, Gave you back to the motherland", which reiterates that her death was not a suicide, but she died for her country.

== Day 40 of her death ==
On day 40 of her death, a large crowd gathered at her burial site, even though she is buried in a small village far from the city. They mostly chanted the slogans of protests and sang an old famous song in Luri "دایه دایه وقت جنگه" ("Oh mother, mother, it's time to fight"). Shakarami's mother gave a speech addressing Nika "I will for ever be in agony for your sufferings, but I love you. When I see that pure seed of your thinking – freedom, courage and honour blossoms in the hearts of other loved ones, I am happy and grateful."

Video showed guards had attempted to prevent people from attending the ceremony by blocking a bridge, the security forces also fired tear gas on people who fought back by throwing stones, and gunshots were audible in video shared on social media. At her memorial ceremony, people attending chanted "We are all Nika, fight and we will fight back."

== Reactions ==
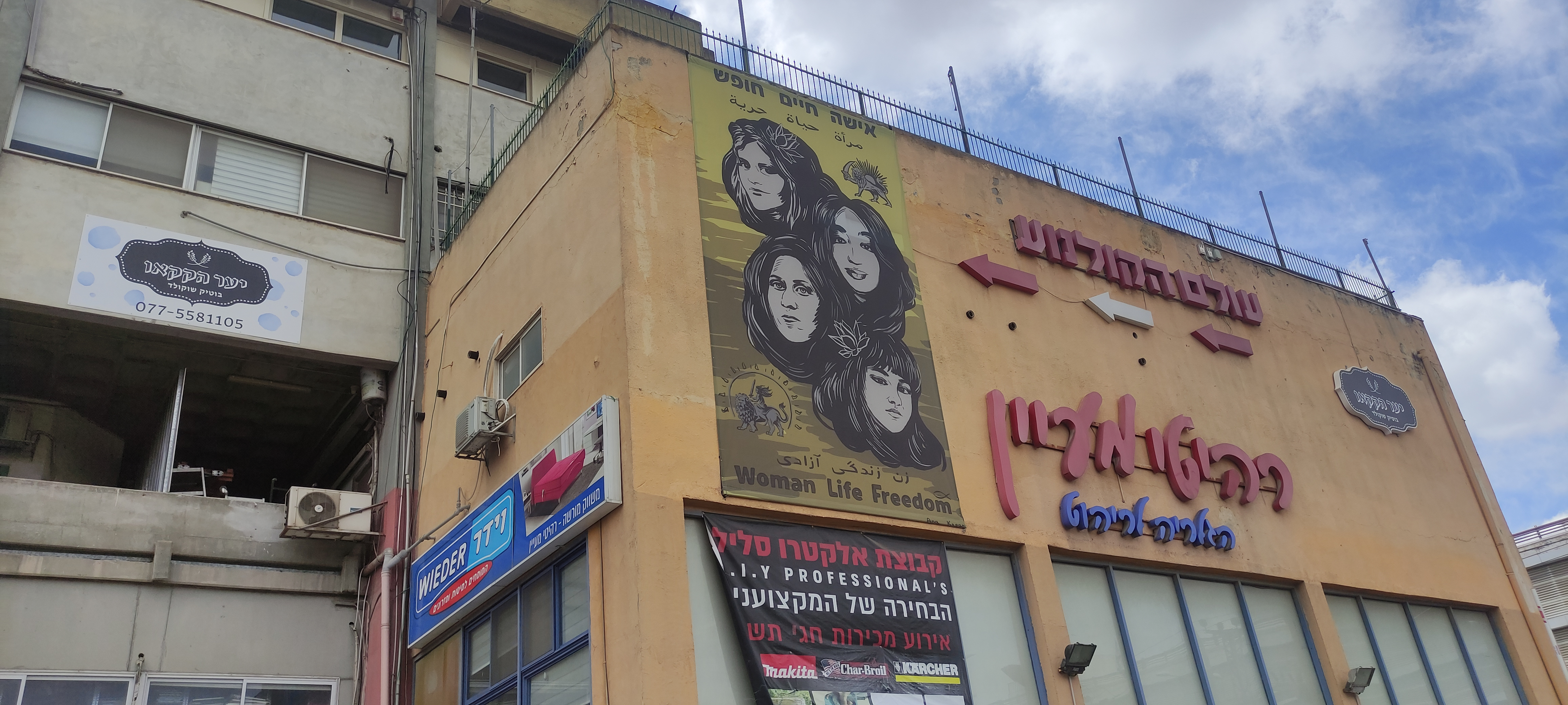
Mural with the faces of Nika Shakarami, Mahsa Amini, Fereshteh Ahmadi, and Sarina Esmaielzahdeh in Jerusalem

Hundreds of protesters gathered in the cemetery of Khorramabad on the day Shakarami's funeral would have been held, spurred into action by the theft of her body. Activists accused the Iranian government of abusing, torturing and killing Shakarami. The news of her death led to high school girls joining the anti-government protests in large numbers on 4 October, some symbolically removing their hijabs in further defiance of the government. The schoolgirls joining the protests was called an "unprecedented show of support" by David Gritten of BBC News. An article by Miriam Berger in The Washington Post described Shakarami's death and the attempt by the authorities to cover it up as "[giving the] demonstrators another rallying cry". According to Mahmood Amiry-Moghaddam, the director of the Iran Human Rights organization, "The available evidence indicates the government's role in Nika Shakrami's murder; Unless the opposite is proven by an independent fact-finding commission under the supervision of the United Nations. Until such a committee is formed, the responsibility for Nika's murder, like the other victims of the current protests, rests with Ali Khamenei and the forces under his command."

The death of Shakarami and the theft of her body was widely reported on in the international media. She was also widely commemorated on social media, where her photo and name were circulated and her name became a hashtag used by the women's rights movement. BBC correspondent Nafiseh Kohnavard commemorated Shakarami by posting a video on Twitter of Shakarami standing on a stage, singing and laughing. The song sung by Shakarami in the clip is an old Iranian love song from the film Soltane Ghalbha (1968). The BBC also shared videos of Shakarami speaking at the recent protests prior to her death.

=== Alleged forced confession from aunt and uncle ===
Shakarami's aunt, Atash Shakarami, and Shakarami's uncle, Mohsen Shakarami were arrested in their homes on October 2, 2022 after publicizing Nika's suspicious death on social media, they were allegedly forced to make a false confession saying Nika had committed suicide and security forces had no involvement in her death via the state-run television at 8:30 local time, October 5, 2022.

Iranian state television aired interviews or "a confession" wherein Shakarami's aunt and uncle "corroborated" the government's narrative. During the confession or interview, her aunt stated that Shakarami had fallen from a roof and her uncle lamented Shakarami's brutal and suspicious death but also expressed doubt that the authorities were responsible, citing religious and legal hurdles, instead blaming social media radicalization and suggesting that she had been killed by protesters from Lorestan wishing to inspire more protests in Lorestan itself. In response to the previous anti-government statements of Shakarami's aunt, who had previously strongly blamed her death on the authorities, he dismissed her as "not a political person". He also claimed that burying Shakarami in Veysian rather than in Tehran had been the family's choice due to worries that "her killer" was in Tehran and could disturb the ceremony.

The interview was reportedly filmed while they were still in government custody. Video of the interview with Shakarami's uncle also showed the silhouette of a person off-camera who could be heard whispering "Say it, you scumbag!"

In an interview with BBC News, Shakarami's mother criticized the government's attempts to cover up their involvement in Nika's death and said the interviews conducted with her brother and sister were done under coercion. Shakarami's mother mentioned that she and other family members had also been intimidated in an attempt to force them to corroborate the official narrative. According to Shakarami's mother, she had seen a medical report that showed that Shakarami had died on 20 September, the same day she went missing, due to blunt force trauma to the head. A death certificate issued by a cemetery in Tehran also stated that Shakarami died after "multiple injuries caused by blows with a hard object".

=== Islamic Republic's reaction ===
The authorities or government did not initially publicly comment on Shakarami's death. The state-owned Iranian news agency Islamic Republic News Agency has reported that the authorities have opened their own investigation into Shakarami's death. On 4 October, the Tasnim News Agency, a news agency closely associated with the Islamic Revolutionary Guard Corps, reported that Shakarami had fallen to her death on 21 September from a building and that eight workers in this building had been arrested. Authorities used a similar suicide by jumping narrative concerning the death of another 16-year-old, Sarina Esmailzadeh, who died, according to Amnesty International, after reportedly being severely beaten by police with batons. The state-owned Fars News Agency released video footage supposedly showing Shakarami entering the building, but the person in the footage is not identifiable. Dariush Shahoonvand, prosecutor in the Lorestan province, denied any wrongdoing on the part of Iranian authorities and claimed that Shakarami had been buried in "her village" and that "foreign enemies" were to blame for creating a "tense and fearful atmosphere" following her death, though he did not elaborate further on what he meant.

According to IRNA news agency, quoting the head of criminal prosecution of Tehran province: "In the autopsy tests and examination of the body, traces of fractures were observed". Also, according to the inquiries received, the person was thrown down." He also mentioned: "There were no traces of bullets or Shot (pellet) in the body."

== See also ==
- Death of Hadis Najafi
- Atefeh Naami
- Human rights in Iran
- International Women's Day Protests in Tehran, 1979
- Iranian protests against compulsory hijab
