= Mahnaz Shirali =

Iranian author and political sociologist (born in Tehran)

- مهناز شیرالی
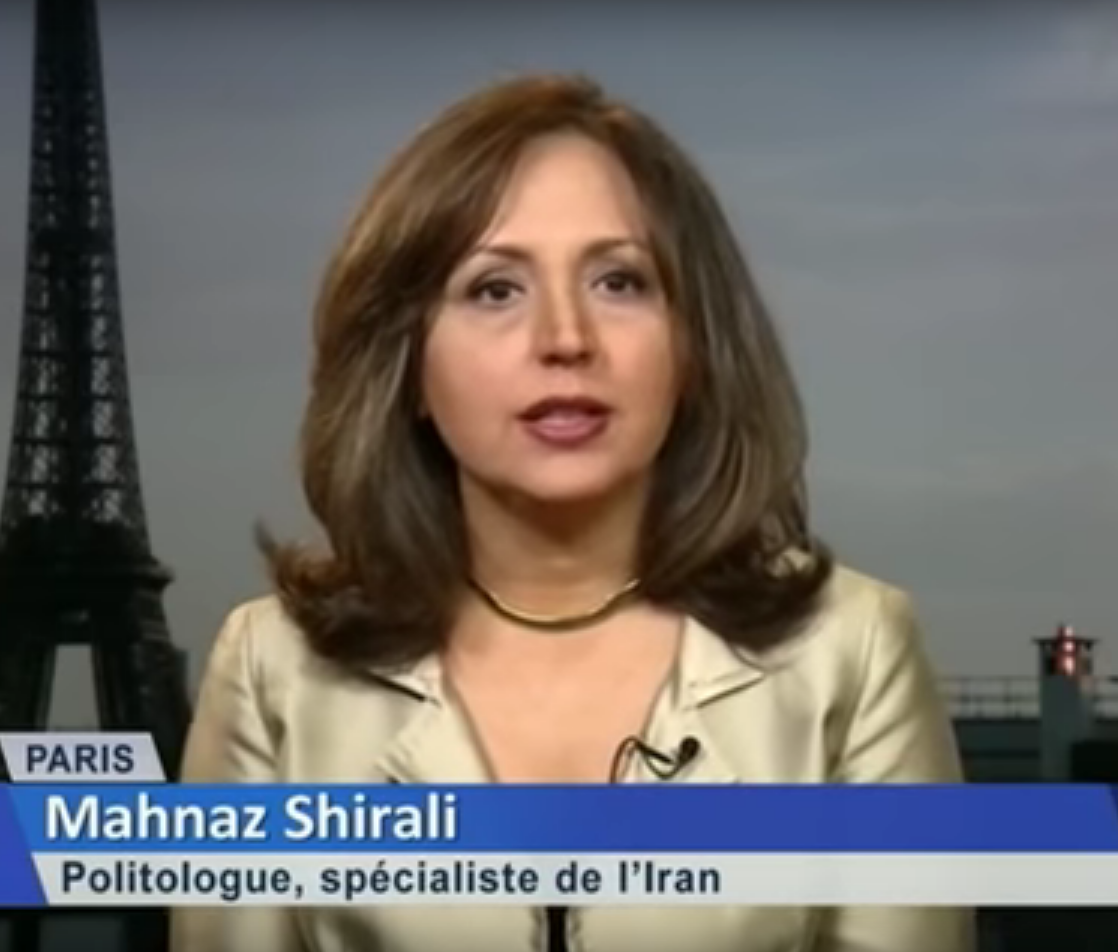
- Shirali on VOA in 2018
- Born: Iran
- Occupations: Author; Political sociologist
- Years active: 2000–
- Known for: Views on Iran
- Notable work: The Mystery of Contemporary Iran

Dr. Mahnaz Shirali is an Iranian author and political sociologist. She graduated in architecture engineering from faculty of fine arts of Tehran University in 1992. She moved to France in 1994 where she obtained her PhD in sociology from School for Advanced Studies in the Social Sciences in Paris in 2000. Her PhD thesis was about crisis in youth Iranian generation.

She was then appointed as a lecturer of the Paris Institute of Political Studies (Sciences Po) as political sociologist and an expert on Iran, as well as director of studies at the Catholic University of Paris.

She, as a writer and expert on Iran, has collaborated with various Persian and French-speaking media around the world such as Radio France Internationale., BBC, Voice of America, Le Point, Le Monde, Radio Télévision Suisse (RTS), Arte, TV5Monde, France 24, Vatican Radio, Radio France Culture, Iran International, Liberté Algeria, France TV, RT France and the Huffington Post

She has authored several books in French and English on the sociological, political, religious and historical aspects of Iran. Among them are The Mystery of Contemporary Iran and La jeunesse iranienne: une génération en crise.

Mahnaz Shirali is a human rights and Iranian women's rights activist and has lectured at various congresses in the field.

== Bibliography ==
- Mahnaz Shirali, The Mystery of Contemporary Iran, New Brunswik (USA) and London (UK), Transaction Publishers, October 2014, 276 p. ISBN 9781351479134
- Mahnaz Shirali, La malédiction du religieux. L’échec de la pensée démocratique en Iran, Préface de Dominique Schnapper, Paris, François Bourin éditeur, septembre 2012, 470 p. ISBN 9782849413418
- Mahnaz Shirali and Dominique Schnapper, Entre islam et démocratie: parcours de jeunes français d'aujourd'hui, Paris, Armand-Colin, octobre 2007, 291 p. ISBN 9782200351014
- Mahnaz Shirali, La jeunesse iranienne : une génération en crise, Préface d’Alain Touraine, Paris, Le Monde/Presses Universitaires de France, Quatrième édition du "Prix Le Monde de la recherche universitaire", novembre 2001, 250 p. ISBN 9782130637820
