= Mahsa Amini protests =

2022–2023 civil unrest in Iran

- Part of the Iranian protests against compulsory hijab, the aftermath of the death of Mahsa Amini and Gen Z protests in Asia
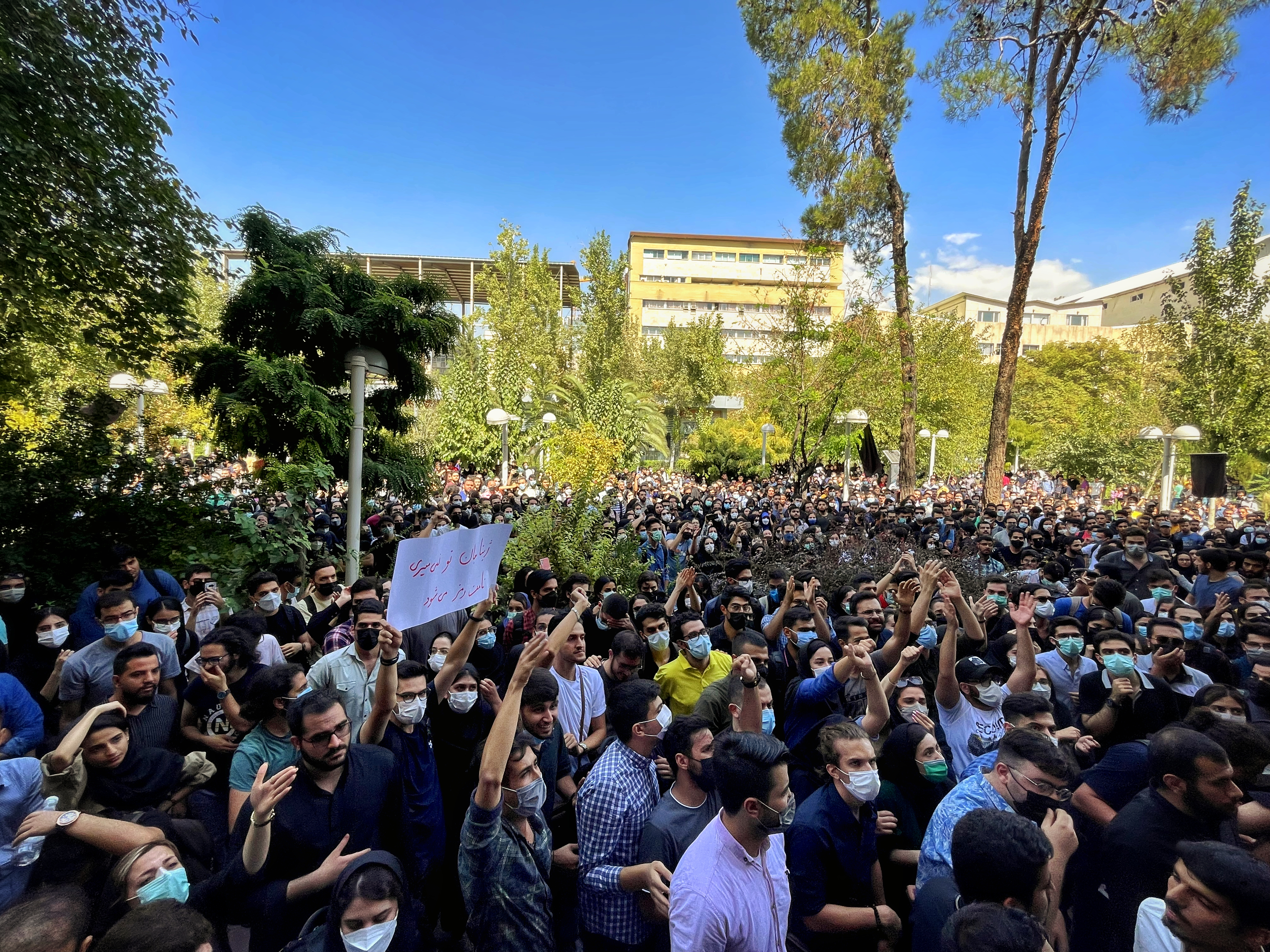
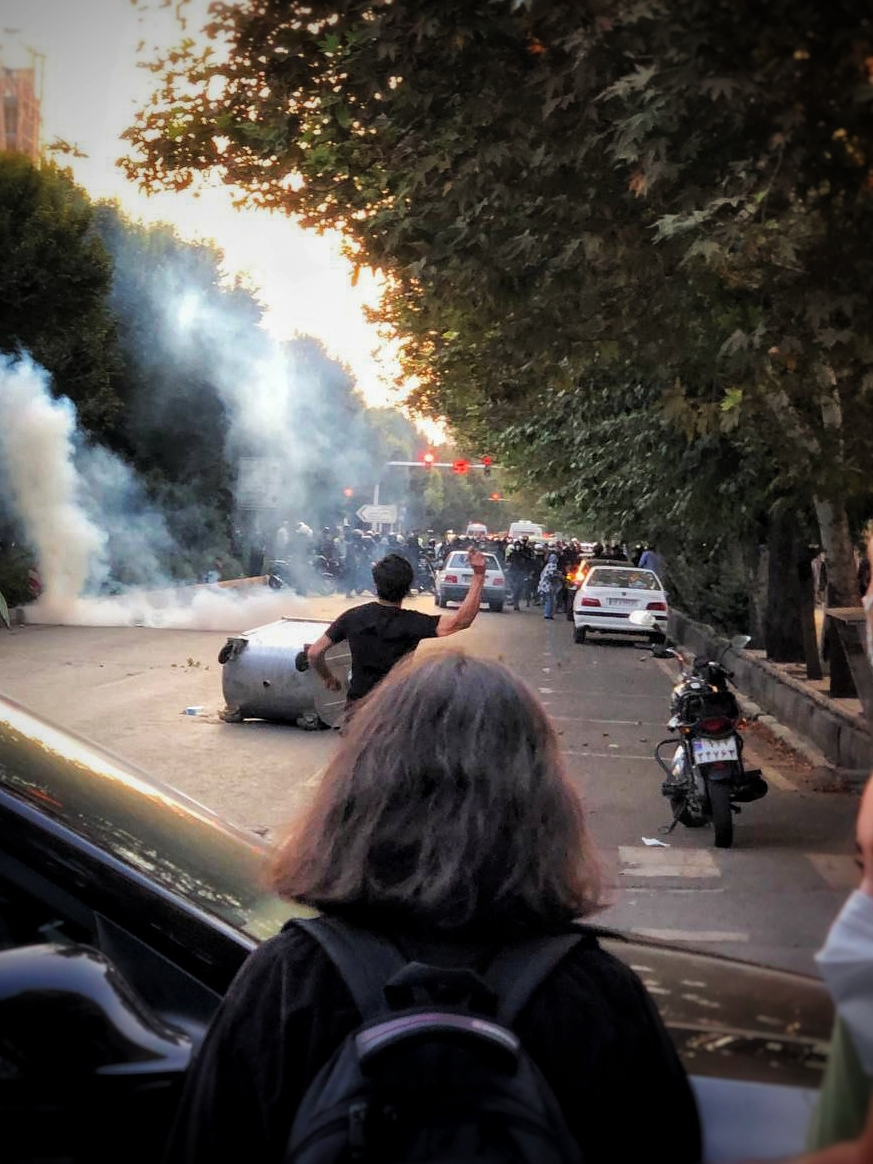
- Protestors at Amirkabir University of Technology (top) and on Keshavarz Boulevard (bottom)
- Date: 16 September 2022 – 2023
- Location: Iran, with solidarity rallies worldwide
- Caused by: Death of Mahsa Amini
- Goals: Revolution, civil, political, and women's rights reform, other reforms such as the dissolution of the Guidance Patrol, and justice for Mahsa Amini's death
- Methods: Demonstrations, strikes, civil disobedience, civil resistance, riots
- Result: Protest failure: hundreds of people killed and tens of thousands beaten and/or detained in government crackdown

Parties
Iranian protesters supported by most of the Iranian opposition organizations and monarchists	Government of Iran; Police Command; Guidance Patrol; Islamic Revolutionary Guard Corps; Basij; State-sponsored foreign militia; Iranian counter-protesters

Lead figures
No centralized leadership	Ali Khamenei (Supreme Leader of Iran); Ebrahim Raisi (President of Iran); Gholam-Hossein Mohseni-Eje'i (Chief Justice of Iran); Hossein Ashtari (Chief Commander of the Police Command of the Islamic Republic of Iran; (Iran) Hossein Salami (Commander of the Islamic Revolutionary Guard Corps Ground Forces); (Iran) Gholamreza Soleimani (Commander of the Basij)

Casualties
- Deaths: At least 551 protesters including 68 minors killed (Iran Human Rights) as of 15 September 2023; 200 killed (state media) as of 3 December 2022; See casualties for details.
- Arrested: As many as 19,262 (HRANA, as of 6 January 2023). See detainees for notable cases.

Civil unrest and protests against the government of the Islamic Republic of Iran associated with the death in police custody of Mahsa Amini (Persian: مهسا امینی) began on 16 September 2022 and carried on into 2023, but by spring 2023, the protests had largely subsided, ultimately leaving the political leadership unchanged and firmly entrenched in power. The protests were described as "unlike any the country had seen before", the "biggest challenge" to the government, and "most widespread revolt" since the Islamic Revolution in 1979.

Amini was arrested by the Guidance Patrol on 13 September 2022 for allegedly violating Iran's mandatory hijab law by wearing her hijab "improperly" while visiting Tehran from Saqqez. According to eyewitnesses, she was severely beaten by Guidance Patrol officers (this was denied by Iranian authorities). She subsequently collapsed, was hospitalized and died three days later. As the protests spread from Amini's hometown of Saqqez to other cities in the Iranian Kurdistan and throughout Iran, the government responded with widespread Internet blackouts, nationwide restrictions on social media usage, tear gas and gunfire.

Although the protests have not been as deadly as those in 2019 (when more than 1,500 were killed), they have been "nationwide, spread across social classes, universities, the streets [and] schools". At least 551 people, including 68 minors, had been killed as a result of the government's intervention in the protests, as of 15 September 2023. (Note: according to the non-profit organization Iran Human Rights) Before February 2023 when most were pardoned, an estimated 19,262 were arrested (Note: according to HRANA, as of 6 January 2023) across at least 134 cities and towns and 132 universities. (Note: according to HRANA as of 4 November 2022)

Female protesters, including schoolchildren, have played a key role in the demonstrations. In addition to demands for increased rights for women, the protests have demanded the overthrow of the Islamic Republic, setting them apart from previous major protest movements in Iran, which have focused on election results or economic woes. The government's response to the protests and its "brutal and disproportionate use of force against peaceful protesters and children" was widely condemned, but Supreme Leader of Iran Ali Khamenei dismissed the unrest as "riots" and part of a "hybrid war" against Iran created by foreign enemy states and dissidents abroad.

On 2 February 2024, the UN Human Rights Council's Fact-Finding Mission released a report which found the Iranian regime committed systematic crimes against humanity.

On 16 September 2026, Amnesty International reported that the Iranian regime instigated the killing, torture, and sexual abuse of protesters during the Mahsa Amini protests, adding that the subsequent suppression of the 2025–2026 Iranian protests exhibited similar characteristics, but on a larger scale.

== Background ==
=== Condition of women and the Islamic Republic ===
Among the primary tenets of the 1979 Iranian Islamic Revolution was the need to overthrow the (allegedly) anti-Islamic, oppressive and foreign power-controlled monarchy of Iran. The secular, modernizing Pahlavi dynasty, founded by Reza Shah in the early twentieth century (1925), had placed the improved treatment of women at the center of its project to modernize Iran. Reza banned the wearing of hijab in public and admitted women to universities. During the reign of his successor and son Mohammad Reza, restrictions on the wearing of hijab were lifted but women were granted suffrage, allowed to enter parliament, and "gained dramatically more rights in marriage". (Note: Although some restrictions remained, such as a requirement that a woman get her husband’s permission to travel abroad.)

The Revolution rescinded the legal rights the Pahlavi Shahs granted women, removed restrictions on men's rights to polygamy and child marriage, and reversed Reza's ban on hijab to make the complete covering of women's hair in public compulsory. Enforcement of the unpopular law was eased during the 2013–2021 tenure of moderate President Rouhani, but intensified under Rouhani's successor, the hard-line President Ebrahim Raisi.

At the same time as rights were taken away, some aspects of the lives of women and girls improved. Traditional pious Iranians—who had kept their daughters out of school during the Shah's era—now felt comfortable allowing their daughters to be schooled in an Islamic educational system. Enrollment of women in universities jumped from 3% in 1977 to 67% in 2015, according to the World Bank statistics. But many of the women who left home to study and developed new values and world views, struggled to secure jobs that matched their new competencies, and became less content with the Islamic Republic than their parents.

=== Protest movements under the Islamic Republic ===
The Mahsa Amini protests were preceded by several other political/social/economic protest movements in Iran, in 1999, 2009, 2011–2012, 2019–2020, and protests against compulsory hijab in 2017–18. Most recently were a series of protests in 2019, "Bloody Aban" (Persian: آبان خونین, a month near November in the Iranian calendar), sparked by a 50–200% increase in fuel prices. Like the Mahsa Amini protests, these protests eventually called for the overthrow of the government of the Islamic Republic and Supreme Leader Ali Khamenei.

=== Mahsa Amini's arrest and death in custody ===
Mahsa Amini, also Jina Amini, a 22-year-old Kurdish Iranian woman, was arrested by the Guidance Patrol on 14 September 2022 because of an "improper hijab." The police were accused of beating her and inflicting a fatal head injury, after a CT scan confirmed that Amini had sustained head injuries, a claim denied by Tehran police. She was pronounced dead on 16 September.

== Protests ==
Protests started in Tehran as Mahsa Amini was being treated at a hospital there, and continued at her funeral in Saqqez, where hundreds of people reportedly gathered in defiance of official warnings and were fired upon when they shouted anti-regime slogans. Protests spread to the provincial capital. Internet service and mobile phone service were shut down, and the head of the Guidance Patrol was allegedly suspended. By 20 September there were unconfirmed social media videos showed anti-government protests in at least 16 of Iran's 31 provinces, and state media reported that three people had been killed in Kurdistan protests.

Two weeks after the funeral, forty civilian were killed and many wounded in Zahedan in Sistan and Baluchestan province following Friday prayers, after protests sparked by reports of a police chief who had raped a 15-year-old girl in Chahbahar. A Mahsa Amini hashtag gained 52 million tweets. By early December 2022, a "vague" statement made by the attorney general was interpreted by some in the Western press to mean that the hijab law was under review and that the Guidance Patrol might be disbanded. The report was later attacked as a "diversion tactic" by the regime.

The protests became more widespread than those of 2009, 2017, and 2019, encompassing even Islamic Republic power bases such as the holy cities of Mashhad and Qom, involving both urban middle classes and rural working areas. In addition, schoolgirls demonstrated in numbers for the first time.

By February 2023, the regime stated it had arrested tens of thousands of protesters.

According to France 24, by mid-March 2023 protests "had dwindled" across most of the country. On 13 March, the government claimed it had pardoned 22,000 citizens arrested for protesting.

=== Slogans and grievances ===
The signature slogan of the protests has been "Woman, Life, Freedom" which reflects the idea that "the rights of women are at the centre of life and liberty". The slogan was popularized during women's marches in Turkey in 2006 in the Kurdish Freedom Movement, and reflects the idea of Kurdish leader Abdullah Ocalan, that "a country can't be free unless the women are free."

Kurds emphasize the Kurdish origin of the slogan, and its connection to Mahsa Amini's Kurdish first name: Jina. In Kurdish, the word jin means "woman". Kurdish and minority rights are subjects of the protest—Kurds make up approximately 15% of Iran's population, are predominately Sunni Muslims (also a minority), the regions they live are among the most impoverished in the country, the use of their languages is restricted, they account for nearly half of all political prisoners in Iran, and have felt much of the brunt of anti-protest attacks by the government (which attacked predominantly Kurdish cities, like Sanandaj and Oshnavieh) who according to news reports, blamed the Kurds for the protest movement.

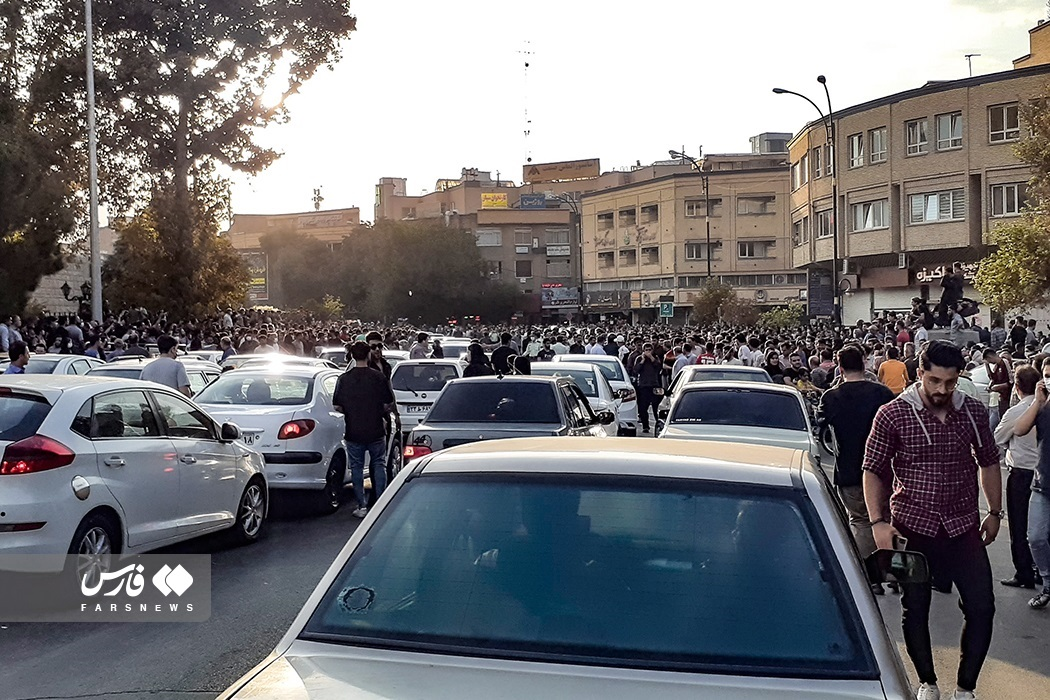
Protests in Hamadan in September 2022

Other slogans collected by Iranwire early in the protests include comments against the Supreme Leader (“Death to the Dictator”, ”Khamenei is a Murderer, an Illegitimate Ruler”, “Death to Khamenei”), the Basij (“Undignified Basiji, You are Our ISIS”), the Islamic Republic (“We Don’t Want the Islamic Republic”); praise for Mahsa, and for the modernist monarch Reza; and comments of defiance (“Iranians Die but Will Not Be Suppressed”).

As demonstrated by the slogans and banners of the demonstrators, protesters appear to be demanding a wholesale change in government rather than just incremental reforms. Grievances expressed in the protest go beyond those of many previous Iranian protests, and beyond protesting Amini's death, demanding an end to the mandatory hijab, an end to the morality police, the Supreme Leader, the theocratic regime, and to human rights violations perpetrated by Iran's Guidance Patrol.

=== Iranian public opinion ===
In a November 2022 poll by Group for Analyzing and Measuring Attitudes in Iran (GAMAAN), almost three-quarters of Iranians opposed mandatory hijab; of this population, 84% prefer a secular Iranian state to theocracy, which GAMAAN characterized as an endorsement of regime change. According to Radio Free Europe/Radio Liberty, economic hardship and poor living conditions contributed to the growth of the protests. The New York Times itemized Iranian grievances such as "soaring prices, high unemployment, corruption, (and) political repression", and identified the poor Iranian economy as a major driving force behind the protests. According to an Iranian report in August 2021, a third of Iranians live in poverty. Abdolreza Davari, a conservative analyst, quoted a statistic that 95 percent of Iranians are "worried about their livelihoods today and for their and their children's future." Only 15% of Iranians in the job market are women. Iran ranked 143rd out of 146 countries in the 2022 WEF Gender Gap Report, due in part to prohibitions on female membership in powerful government organizations.

=== Protest techniques ===
Location of cities in Iran recorded to have had protests during the Mahsa Amini protests. (Last Update: 19 November 2022)

Protesters often stage small and quick, but numerous, "flash mob"-style gatherings. Drivers have blocked streets with their cars to slow down security forces. Roads have also been blocked by dumpster bins or even overturned police cars. Security forces on motorbikes cut through traffic, while firing on protesters. In some cases, security forces used paintballs to mark demonstrators. Some demonstrators packed extra clothes to replace painted clothes, wore masks to avoid identification, and dismantled public security cameras. Some protesters chanted from windows or rooftops. Symbolic protests include dyeing fountains blood-red, and women discarding and burning their hijabs or cutting their hair in public. Since turbans are viewed as a symbol of the regime, some Iranians engaged in turban throwing (knocking the turbans off of "privileged" Iranian clerics on the street and running away). Reformers such as Ahmad Zaidabadi criticized the trend as being unfair to Islamic scholars not involved with the regime.

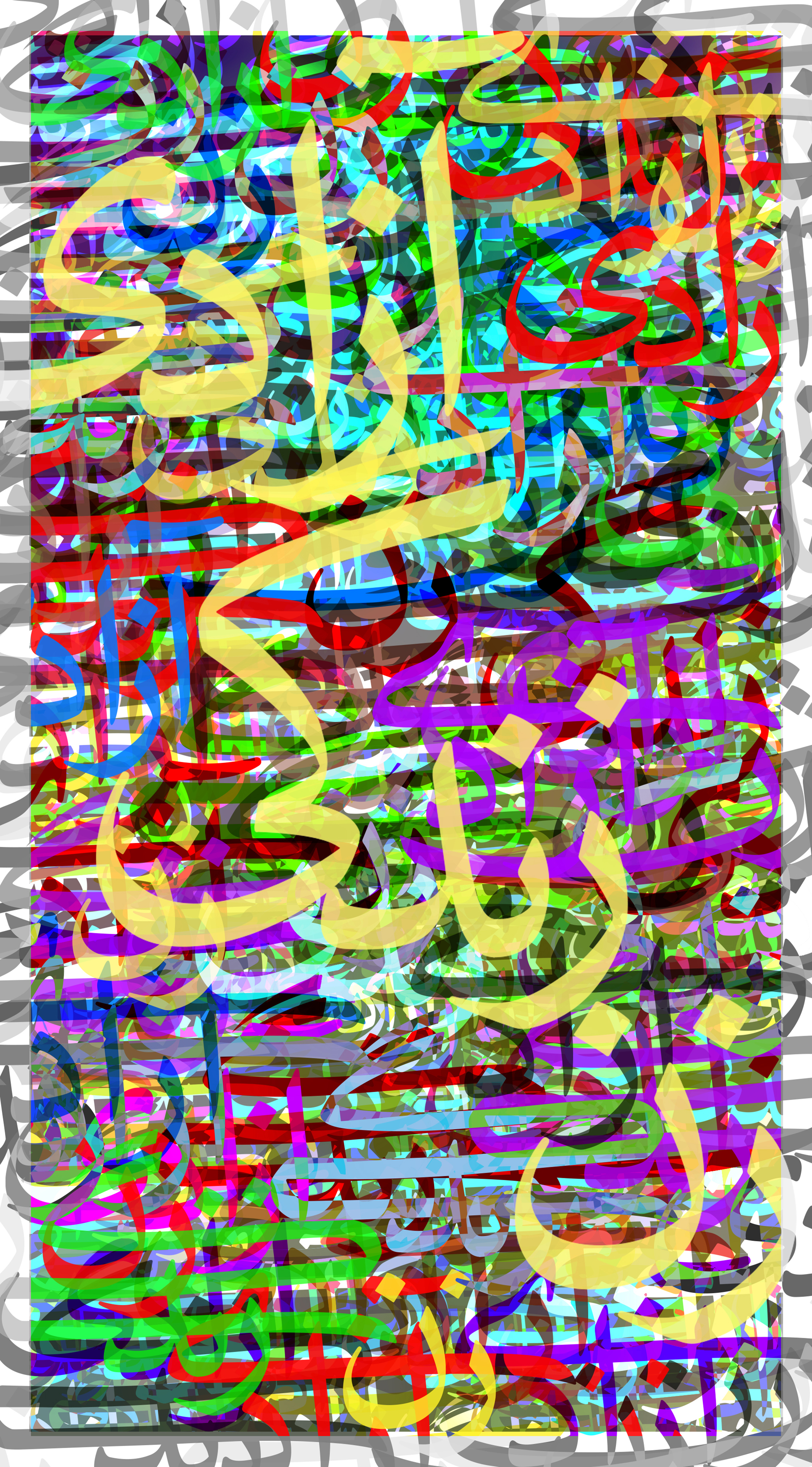
"Woman, life, freedom"; One of the main slogans of the protesters

=== Civil boycotts ===
Some university teachers and professors declared their support for the student movement by boycotting classes or resigning. They included Nasrollah Hekmat (Shahid Beheshti University), Ammar Ashoori (Islamic Azad University), Lili Galehdaran (Shiraz Art University), Gholamreza Shahbazi (Art and Soureh Universities), Alireza Bahraini, Shahram Khazaei, Encieh Erfani (Institute for Advanced Studies in Basic Sciences) and Azin Movahed (Sharif University of Technology, Tehran).

On 5 to 7 December 2022, a general strike took place to put pressure on the regime.

Protesters called for boycotts against goods manufactured by businesses reportedly tied to the regime, two examples being a major manufacturer of groceries and home goods as well as "Iran’s version of Amazon, Digikala".

=== Media Western coverage ===
Coverage of the protest was constrained by Iranian restrictions on speech, including internet shutdowns and arrests of journalists, such that "the vast majority" of Western media outlets had no presence in Iran (with the exception of NBC News) and had to obtain information from networks of contacts, human rights groups, and social media content. According to BBC News Persian Service, Iranian government disinformation contaminated social media as an information source, which must therefore be used with care. The Iranian government "have a cyber army and they massively produce social media videos, even fake interviews." When foreign media quote them, it would be charged by the Iranian government for "reporting fake news".

== Casualties, government response ==
The government crackdown on the protests has been described as "intense" and "deadly".

=== Casualties ===
At least 551 people had been killed as of 15 September 2023, according to Iran Human Rights, including women and at least 68 minors. (Note: On 20 September 2022, Esmail Zarei Kousha, governor of the northwestern Kurdistan province, confirmed the first three deaths in the protests, and stated that they were not killed by security forces. As of 26 September, a count of official statements by authorities tallied at least 13 dead, while state-controlled television news suggested that at least 41 had been killed, including protesters and police. On 3 December, the government stated that 200 were killed—a figure still significantly lower than that provided by the United Nations and human rights groups.) Death certificates obtained by Human Rights Activists in Iran, HRANA, confirm that many died from live bullets. The Norway-based group, Iran Human Rights, stated that with the current Internet blackouts, it was difficult to get accurate and up-to-date figures. In addition to Amini herself, the death of several women protesters, including Nika Shakarami, Hadis Najafi and Sarina Esmailzadeh, were widely reported by the media. According to the families of deceased protesters, Iranian authorities have covered up killings of protesters by pressuring the families of victims, and by fabricating reports of suicides or car accidents.

==== Government casualties ====
The Islamic Republican government has emphasized the loss of life from the government security forces (such as the Basij paramilitary volunteers and Revolutionary Guards), reporting that by 6 January 2023, 68 security force members had been killed in the unrest. (Note: by 25 September 2022, five Basij members had been killed by protesters. By 26 October 2022, when an IRGC officer was killed in Malayer, 33 security force members had been killed. By 6 January 2023, 68 security force members had been killed.) However, according to BBC Persian service, these figures may not be reliable as some of those reported by state media to be loyalist Basij militiamen killed by the "rioters" were actually protesters killed by security forces. Security forces (using state media to put out this story) had pressured the families of the deceased to go along with the false reporting, allegedly threatening them with death if they failed to cooperate.

Number of protesters killed by province and county.

Number of casualties by province, according to Iran Human Rights
Province	Fatalities
Sistan and Baluchestan	136
Tehran	77
Kurdistan	57
West Azerbaijan	56
Mazandaran	42
Alborz	32
Gilan	29
Kermanshah	24
Isfahan	19
Khuzestan	18
Fars	15
Razavi Khorasan	9
East Azerbaijan	5
Qazvin	5
Zanjan	3
Lorestan	3
Markazi	3
Kohgiluyeh and Boyer-Ahmad	3
Hamadan	2
Ardabil	2
Ilam	2
Bushehr	2
Hormozgan	2
Golestan	2
Semnan	1
North Khorasan	1
Total	551

=== Arrests and death sentences ===
According to Human Rights Activists in Iran (HRANA), 19,262 Iranians across at least 134 cities and towns and 132 universities, were arrested as of 6 January 2023. (Note: according to HRANA as of 4 November 2022) In February 2023, Iran state media reported that in honour of the anniversary of the 1979 Iranian Islamic revolution, "tens of thousands" of Iranians arrested in connection with the Mahsa Amini protests had been pardoned. This did not include all protesters and some journalists arrested. The pardon had been requested by the head of the judiciary, Gholam-Hossein Mohseni-Eje'i, who asserted that, “during recent events, a number of people, especially young people, committed wrong actions and crimes as a result of the indoctrination and propaganda of the enemy. Since the foreign enemies and anti-revolutionary currents’ plans have been foiled, many of these youth now regret their actions.”

Prior to the release, hundreds of women have been detained and abused by the authorities who used torture and ill-treatment to obtain false confessions from them and from men who had also been arrested. Some of those arrested were subjected to “sham trials designed to intimidate those participating in the popular uprising that has rocked Iran”, according to Amnesty International. According to the Committee to Protect Journalists, at least forty journalists have been detained by mid-October 2022. Anonymous sources cited by CBS News have stated that many protesters decline to seek medical assistance due to a reasonable fear of imprisonment.

It was reported on 1 November 2022 that Iran had charged about a thousand people in Tehran for their alleged involvement in the protests and was holding public trials against the accused. A contradictory report from the state aligned news agency ISNA claimed that only 315 people were indicted in Tehran with more than 700 others indicted in other provinces. An informal network of activists inside Iran, known as the Volunteer Committee for Monitoring the Situation of Detainees, has alleged that as of 30 October, intelligence agencies reported the arrest of 130 human rights defenders, 38 women's rights advocates, 36 political activists, 19 lawyers and 38 journalists along with citizen protesters. An additional count of 308 university students and 44 minors that had been arrested by Iranian forces was also released by the Volunteer Committee.

On 23 November 2022, Farideh Moradkhani, niece of Iran's Supreme Leader, Ayatollah Ali Khamenei was arrested in Tehran after calling on foreign governments to cut ties with Iran following the government's protest crackdowns.

==== Executions ====
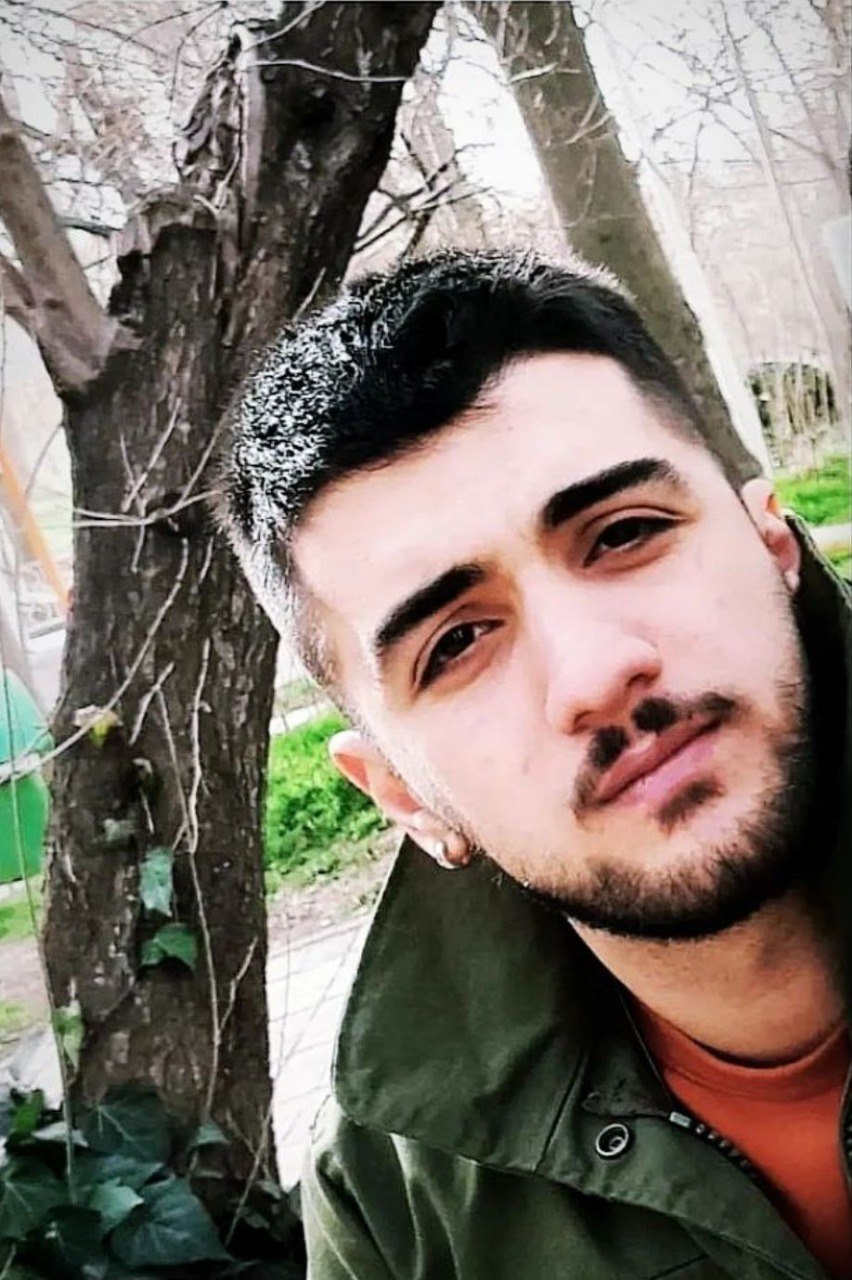
21-year-old Mehdi Karami was convicted of Fisad-e-filarz (an Arabic term meaning "corruption on Earth") and executed in January 2023

As of Spring 2023, seven individuals have been executed in connection with the protests.

In November 2022, a Revolutionary Court in Tehran issued its first death sentence for one of the protesters on the charges of moharebeh ("enmity against God"), "corruption on Earth" and "setting fire to a government centre, disturbing public order and collusion for committing crimes against national security". (Note: Canadian Prime Minister Justin Trudeau tweeted false information that the Iranian state had imposed the death penalty on nearly 15,000 protesters; the tweet was taken down eleven hours later.)

The first execution of the Mahsa Amini protests took place on 8 December 2022, when 23-year-old Mohsen Shekari was hanged on charges of moharebeh for allegedly blocking a road and using a machete to wound a police officer. Iran Human Rights director Mahmood Amiry-Moghaddam called Shekari's trial a "show trial without any due process". On 12 December 2022, Iran publicly hanged a second protester, Majidreza Rahnavard.

Two additional individuals, Mohammad Mehdi Karami and Seyyed Mohammad Hosseini, were hanged on 7 January 2023, in connection with the alleged killing of a Basij paramilitary member during the protests. On 19 May 2023, three others, namely, Majid Kazemi, Saleh Mirhashemi, and Saeed Yaqoubi, were executed in connection with the protests.

=== Suspected poisonings ===
==== University students ====
More than 1,200 Iranian university students at six universities were reportedly poisoned, displaying symptoms of vomiting, hallucinations, and severe body aches before they were due to attend anti-regime protests across the country. Videos posted online showed students dumping their canteen food onto the streets in protest. The Iranian science ministry blamed the illnesses on food poisoning, but the student union claimed that past experiences at Isfahan university and the sudden lack of electrolytes at university clinics suggested that the occurrence was the deliberate work of the regime aimed at thwarting the protests. Iranians called for a three-day period of national strikes and protests to begin on 7 December 2022.

==== Schoolgirls ====
Starting in November 2022 and over the course of months, thousands of schoolgirls were hospitalized, in circumstances suspected to arise from mass toxic gas poisoning attacks. Some eyewitnesses reported signs of toxic gas attack. There were allegations that the poisonings were acts of retaliations by pro-regime actors against young women for their role in the protests against the mandatory hijab. According to one secondary schoolgirl from Tehran quoted by The New Yorker magazine, “It’s revenge for the disturbances we made. Not a single person disagrees.” The Islamic Republic regime arrested more than 100 people who claimed responsibility for the alleged poisonings.

According to Nature magazine, an independent investigation would be required, including access to hospital test results and interviews with patients, in order to draw any firm conclusions about whether some or all of the incidents were real poisonings, or whether the entire epidemic could instead be attributed to mass psychogenic illness. The Guardian and others criticized Iran for its slow, opaque, and contradictory responses to the epidemic.

=== Statements by officials ===
On 3 October 2022, the Supreme Leader of the Islamic Republic of Iran, Ali Khamenei, commented for the first time on Amini's death and said that "[her] death deeply broke my heart" and called it a "bitter incident", while giving his full support to security forces against protesters. Khamenei dismissed the widespread unrest as "riots" caused by foreign states and dissidents abroad.

On 10 October, Iranian foreign ministry spokesperson Nasser Kanaani called on foreigners to "respect our laws" and noted that Iran had arrested nine citizens of the European Union for supporting the protests.

On 2 November, Khamenei described the events of the past few weeks as "an hybrid war" and said that "the young people who came to the streets are our own children". In April 2023, he further said that "rejecting hijab was religiously and politically forbidden" and that women who do this open up to foreign intelligence.

The IRI foreign minister, Hossein Amir-Abdollahian, tweeted that the “various security services, Israel and some Western politicians who have made plans for civil war, destruction and the disintegration of Iran, should know that Iran is not Libya or Sudan.”

In the week before 15 November 2022, 227 of Iran's 290 parliamentarians signed a statement declaring that protesters “waging war against God” should be dealt with in a way that would “teach an example.” Because "waging war on God" (engaging in moharebeh) is punishable by death in Iran, this statement led to widespread erroneous reporting that 15,000 protesters (the approximate number of those arrested) had been sentenced to death.

=== Government strategy and tactics ===
The Islamic Republican government has worked to prevent the protesters from coordinating and from coming together under a unified leadership. To enforce domestic order against protesters, the IRI prefers to rely on its paramilitary militia, the Basij as in the past, revolts have turned into revolutions when professional militaries disobeyed orders to attack their own people (for example, during the 1991 Soviet coup attempt and the Iranian Revolution itself).

During unrest, the IRI has maintained the capability to shut down Internet and cellphone services (with technological support from China and Russia), ensuring news of protest and communication between protesters is unavailable. If protesters bring phones and neglect to disable tracking, the government attempts to track and identify protesters through the phones' GPS.

Some observers report that Iran deployed foreign militias, such as Lebanese Hezbollah and Iraqi and Afghan Shia militias aligned with the IRGC, to assist its domestic forces in suppressing the protests.

Human rights violations used by the IRI to intimidate and discourage protesters reportedly include use of "shotguns, assault rifles, and handguns against protesters in largely peaceful and often crowded settings", resulting in the killing and injuring of hundreds (Human Rights Watch, based on videos, interviews with witnesses and a security force member); forced confessions, threats to uninvolved family members, and torture, including electric shocks, controlled drowning, and mock execution (based on CNN interviews); sexual violence (according to testimony and social media videos, and several such accounts corroborated by a CNN investigation, including the case of a political dissident being brutally raped in custody), “systematic" attempts using projectiles such as "pellets, teargas canisters, paintball bullets" "to blind protesters by shooting at their eyes" (activist media group IranWire documented at least 580 cases). Under the guise of rushing injured civilians to receive emergency medical attention, ambulances were used to transport security forces and kidnapped protesters.

While this may seem brutal and inhumane to some, “in the mind of the regime, nothing is off limits because we’re doing God’s work,” according to scholar Borzou Daragahi.

=== Communications blackouts ===
Beginning on 19 September, the Iranian government has blocked access to specific Internet services and repeatedly shut down the Internet and cellphone partly and networks entirely, in order to prevent images and video of the protests from reaching a worldwide audience, and to hinder protesters from organizing effectively. According to Internet monitoring group NetBlocks, these are "the most severe Internet restrictions since the November 2019 massacre", when during the 2019–2020 protests the Internet was completely shut down for a week, and 1,500 protesters were killed by government forces. Outages during the current protests have been shorter and less widespread than the 2019 blackout, and are highly disruptive, but widely circumvented. Iranians have been hopping between services depending on what currently works.

Despite the nationwide Internet blackouts, some videos of the events were distributed internationally. A small group of people from both inside and outside of Iran run the 1500tasvir Instagram account, which, as of October 2022, had over 450,000 followers. The group stated that on typical days they received more than 1,000 videos and published dozens. They posted video to their Twitter accounts. One member of the 1500tasvir team described the impact of Internet shutdowns as "extraordinary", and negatively impacting protests, saying that "When you [can] ... see other people feel the same way, you get more brave" but "When the Internet is cut off ... you feel alone". IranWire and Radio Zamaneh, exiled journalistic outlets, collect information from Iran and have had drastically increased Iranian online audiences since the protests began; they also broadcast by satellite.

Prior to the protests, access to the Internet was already heavily restricted, in what NetBlocks calls a "filternet". Over five million websites were blocked. Many Internet domains were blocked. Social media were especially restricted: Facebook, Telegram, TikTok, and Twitter were all previously blocked after the 2009 post-election protests. These blocks are not entirely effective; Twitter is still widely used by Iranians, and Telegram is also used. Instagram and WhatsApp had been allowed and were popular in Iran (reportedly, 2 million Iranian businesses were on Instagram, and 70% of Iranian adults used WhatsApp), and early in the protests, they were only blocked regionally, being blocked only in Saqqez and Sanandaj for a few days beginning on 19 September. Beginning on 21 September, Instagram and WhatsApp were also blocked nationwide. Iranian state media has said the imposed restrictions are due to "national security" concerns. The blocking of WhatsApp was fairly effective, but Instagram remained very widely used despite the block. As of 24 September, access to Skype has reportedly been blocked. As of 29 September, the Apple App Store, the Google Play Store, and LinkedIn have also been blocked.

According to Foreign Policy magazine, Iran's National Information Network (NIN) ("the most important weapon in the Islamic Republic’s communications arsenal" and modeled on Russia's and China's intranet systems), gives the state "the ability to control what people see, how they communicate, and the choices they make", and has improved its capabilities from 2012 to 2023, with each round of protest.

Many Iranians have used VPNs to bypass Internet filtering, hopping from one to another as they are blocked. VPNs are illegal in Iran, so providers act as a mafia with government connections. VPN service has been progressively downgraded. Tor Browser is also used. Psiphon is popular.

It has also been reported that text messages are being filtered, and communications which mention Amini's name are blocked from delivery to the intended recipient. People began using end-to-end-encrypted instant messaging clients instead. WhatsApp stated that they are working to keep Iranian users connected and would not block Iranian phone numbers; it has successfully been blocked for much of the protests. Telegram is widely used, especially by activists and journalists, as is Signal. Signal asked the tech community and international volunteers to run proxy servers (to circumvent blocks on the Signal servers). Signal also published support documents in Persian. However, Signal has been hampered by Iranian blocking of SMS validation text codes that Signal attempts to send to its users.

In addition to selectively blocking websites, the entire network has repeatedly been shut down and cut off from the world outside Iran. This is expensive; the cost was estimated at $37 million US a day. Multiple monitoring groups have documented rolling connectivity blackouts, affecting Iran's largest mobile carriers, with a "curfew-style pattern of disruptions" that lasts for 12 hours at a time. Internet speeds have also been throttled at times when people are on the streets, probably to prevent them from uploading videos. With the spread of demonstrations to over 80 cities across the country, the government repeatedly shut down mobile networks. As the protests wore on, increasingly only the 4G cellphone masts covering the areas of the protests were shut down, so that mobile data was not available to protesters.

Satellite and direct peer-to-peer communications bypass blocked wire, fiber, and cellphone network hardware entirely. Satellite news broadcasts, such as London-based Farsi-language Iran International, provided updates on planned demonstrations. Jamming by the Iranian government was partially successful in blocking foreign satellite TV in parts of Iran. On 7 October, Eutelsat accused Iran of jamming two Persian-language broadcast satellites, in contravention of ITU rules. Toosheh is a satelltite data broadcast which uses satellite TV receiving equipment common in Iran. It can be used to download files, which are then sometimes sneakernetted, but it cannot be used to upload content. Starlink satellite uplinks require 30-pound (14 kg) ground stations, and a large clear space to place the antenna in, which makes them hard to import and hide. They are also difficult to set up.

Iranians use mesh networks, including mobile ad-hoc networks, in which consumer computers and cellphones transmit data between one another directly (by radio: Wi-Fi and Bluetooth). However, the physical devices have to be close enough (within ~10 metres (33 ft)) to relay the data from one to another, so this is not useful for talking to the world outside Iran. Some activists distributed paper leaflets detailing planned protests.

=== Response by regime supporters ===
Aside from security forces, the regime is assisted by civilian hardline supporters of the Islamic Republic government who make up a minority of the population. (Note: "... unveiled woman on the street should be prepared to 'face the complaints of the people, to see that she has no place.' Even according to the regime’s own polling, a minority in Iran holds such views.") A 2017 speech by Supreme Leader Khamenei is widely believed to have given his supporters/regime supporters "extrajudicial powers" referred to as atash be-ekhtiyar, or permission to "fire at will" against regime enemies. Civilian hardliners are valuable to the regime because they “will turn out on the street" when the regime needs them and is willing to do unpopular or illegal deeds "that the state doesn’t want to do” in attacking government opponents, giving the state "plausible deniability". But as an ideological group it is not totally obedient to the regime and must be "catered to", limiting the regime's ability to compromise.

These supporters held counter-protests across several cities in Iran in response to the protests, which the Iranian government referred to as "spontaneous". The pro-government counter protesters called for the Mahsa Amini protesters to be executed, and referred to them as "Israel's soldiers" whilst shouting "Death to America" and "Death to Israel", reflecting Iran's clerical rulers' usual narrative that dissatisfaction with its rule is the result of foreign conspiracy not its own doing.

As of mid-2023, vigilantism by the core of regime supporters was said to be "on the rise" with reports of "armed men on motorbikes roamed the streets" in the city of Rasht, ordering unveiled women to cover up.

=== Government campaign for public opinion ===
According to some sources (such as Vali Nasr), the government pitched a campaign to convince traditional supporters of the regime whose support was now wavering, propagandizing that the “'women, life, freedom' movement was part of a coördinated campaign to destabilize Iran". “There was an amazing amount of sympathy among more conservative and regime-affiliated women for these girls and the arguments they were making,” according to Nasr. One effective piece messaging was “For the Girl Next Door”, an online video that tied together video clips of "two decades of Afghan women’s suffering" with that of U.S. presidents touting their success in combatting the Taliban and speculating how the U.S. might “free” Iran, all set to the anthem of the protests, “Baraye,” by the Iranian musician Shervin Hajipour.

The lyrics warned the girls of Iran not to let themselves be similarly victimized by the West: “For you, the girl next door / don’t let your home get ruined like ours / don’t let your dreams become like our stories / don’t let war happen in your country.”

Eventually, for the most part, the traditional supporters returned "home", and abandoned sympathy for the protests.

== Aftermath ==
As of September 2023, Iranians are saying things like, "the women of Iran have crossed the threshold of fear," and Iranian "society won't go back to the pre-Mahsa time" (film-maker Mojgan Ilanlou); but also that the government has "dug its heels in", (Jasmin Ramsey, deputy director of the New York-based NGO The Center for Human Rights in Iran). Others (Holly Dagres) insist the protests have continued but not been given the publicity they deserve. (Note: "I know that there's some skepticism in the West about where these protests are going, but we're now a year into these ongoing anti-establishment protests, and they've been happening day in and day out in various forms, whether it be women not abiding by mandatory hijab rules, ethnic minorities like in the southeastern province of Sistan, Baluchestan, protesting every Friday after prayer, people chanting from the rooftops and their windows that they don't want an Islamic republic and, of course, graffiti that's been scrawled on the walls calling the supreme leader of Iran a murderer. To me, these protests have been sustaining this whole year, and unfortunately, they're not getting the attention that they deserve.")

=== Lack of head covering ===
According to the BBC News Caroline Hawley, behavior unthinkable before the death of Mahsa Amini is now commonplace as of August 2023 in at least Tehran:

A young woman walks down a street in Tehran, her hair uncovered, her jeans ripped, a bit of midriff exposed to the hot Iranian sun. An unmarried couple walk hand in hand. A woman holds her head high when asked by Iran's once-feared morality police to put a hijab on, and tells them: "Screw you!"

20% of women in Iran are now going out on to the streets without the veil, according to the estimate of a Western diplomat in Tehran. Another source states the rebellion is "a generational thing much more than a geographical thing" and not limited to Tehran. "It's not just your bright educated people, it's basically any young person with a smartphone … so that's what takes you right out into the villages, and all over."

==== Crackdown ====
In the weeks and months after the protest started, observers often used the word "revolution" or "regime change" to describe the protests or what they might become. (Note: In October 2022, several intellectuals disagreed on whether the protests already constituted a revolution; several described conditions in which the protest could become a revolution. Author Maral Karimi stated that the protests "definitely [had] the potential" to become a revolution, but that "theoretically, we can never say if it's a revolution until it's concluded". Karim Sadjadpour of the Carnegie Endowment for International Peace judged it impossible to predict whether there would be sufficient "divisions at the top" for the protests to become a "full-scale" revolution. Political scientist Janice Stein stated that "where revolutions succeed" would be whether security forces would be willing to fire on citizens. Author Dina Nayeri stated that "Iranian women aren't looking for hijab reform or concessions on gender laws. They're leading a revolution. The people of Iran don't want to live under Sharia or any religious law." Chess arbiter Shohreh Bayat stated that the protests had evolved into a revolution, "fighting for freedom and for women's and human rights". In October 2022, Southern Cross University lecturer Nasim Salehi argued that women had been actively organising a "quiet revolution" since the 1979 Iranian Revolution, being "courageous and bold" in the July 1999 student protests against the closure of the newspaper Salam, the 2009 presidential election protests, the 2017–2018 protests against governmental economic policies, and the 2019–2020 Bloody Aban protests against fuel price increases. Salehi described the protests as "evolution toward revolution", where evolution is seen as "small yet strong and consistent change". Her research group had earlier found that young Iranian women saw themselves as agents of social change. By early November, the protests were seen by The Guardian as the greatest challenge to the Iranian government since the 1979 revolution. Unlike the 2019–2020 protests, the Mahsa Amini protests spread nationwide, across social classes, universities, the streets and schools. As of November 2022, the protest movement did not have a centralized leadership. On 23 December 2022, Parisa Hafezi, writing in Reuters, described the events as the "worst legitimacy crisis since the 1979 Islamic Revolution [for] Iran's religious leaders". The BBC called the protests "the longest running anti-government protests in Iran since the 1979 Islamic revolution.") However, as of September 2023, a crackdown was in process.

The list of punishments for women who disobey the dress code keeps intensifying. Hefty fines. Banking restrictions. Business closures. Jail time. Forced labor. Travel bans. Being diagnosed as mentally ill.

In spring 2023, 150 cafés and shops "were reportedly shuttered for failing to enforce the hijab law". In mid-July, just before the start of the holy month of Muharram, a spokesman for Iranian law enforcement formally announced that the morality police would return to the streets, after being quietly removed for several months (widespread internet outages were observed on 15 July, the day of their returned to the streets). Punishment in Tehran for not wearing a head scarf was reportedly washing corpses in a morgue.

21 September a "Hijab and Chastity Bill" passed Iran's parliament, calling for new punishments on women who go unveiled, including prison terms of up to 10 years and fines of 500m-1bn rials ($11,800-$23,667) for "'those who do not comply … in an organised way or encourage others to do so'".

Prior to the anniversary of Mahsa Amini's slaying, family members of Mahsa and of people killed protesting her death were arrested or threatened to stay off the street (according to Kurdistan Human Rights Network). Amini's father Amjad was reportedly detained by authorities. Military helicopters hovered over the Aichi cemetery where she was buried with military personnel and police stationed throughout the area, (according to IranWire).

==== Surveillance of protesters and dissidents ====
Since the protests officials have expanded digital and video surveillance of the public and used footage of unveiled women to identify them and deny them services and impose fines. In potentially the first usage of facial recognition technology to enforce religious dress codes, some women involved in the protests have received hijab violation citations in the mail without any prior interaction with law enforcement officers. Iranian authorities may have trialed the technology as early as 2020, when women were sent warnings through SMS text if they were not wearing a hijab within motor vehicles.

In late April, Alireza Zakani, the mayor of Tehran, announced that un-hijabed women attempting to use the metro would be issued warnings, and eventually prevented from entering stations. Transportation officials said unveiled women drivers would be detected by traffic-surveillance cameras and cars of repeat offenders impounded. Also around this time, a law was proposed in parliament that would impose a range of new penalties on women who defy the dress codes or advocate against them online, such as substantial fines and the “deprivation of social rights”.

In August 2023 the government opened a website—Specialcommittee.ir—for the public to inform on protesters.

Nonetheless, the regime is reportedly still reportedly trying to encourage compliance through persuasion and “cultural work”.

== Analysis ==
In an analysis by Emily Blout, she finds that the protest's lack of success in bringing about the changes it demanded were not so much a matter of its mistakes as the regime's success, and that the regime drew on the lessons from its overthrew of the Shah, specifically his mistakes in trying to prevent revolution. Blout credits:

- The regime's decisive and unwavering repression of the protest, policy of crushing protest rather than meeting any of the "calls for change", fighting as though the regime's "life and livelihood depends upon it", which Blout points out it did. Security forces are well compensated and do not have the option of fleeing to Europe or America as the Shah's loyalists did.
- Total lack of incentive to follow human rights accords; the regime's "patrons"—Russia and China—also have "dismal" human rights records and would never encourage Iran to soften its position.
- The regime's increasingly effective control of media
  - Effective manipulation of the narrative of the protests, playing on nationalist emotion and conspiracy theories (the fear of separatism and terrorism by ethnic minorities such as the Kurds); "using old and fake footage" to muddy the truth when not outright lying, and slander female protesters and "claim massive public support for its rule" on social media.
  - Technological controls following the example of Russia and China through its National Information Network, which can enforce “digital curfews” that made it "almost impossible to communicate effectively with the outside world", and can control electronic communication at "a granular level", for example directing mobile internet carriers to cut service entirely when a particularly province becomes restive, or during days of mourning for slain protesters that accentuate unrest.

== International reactions ==
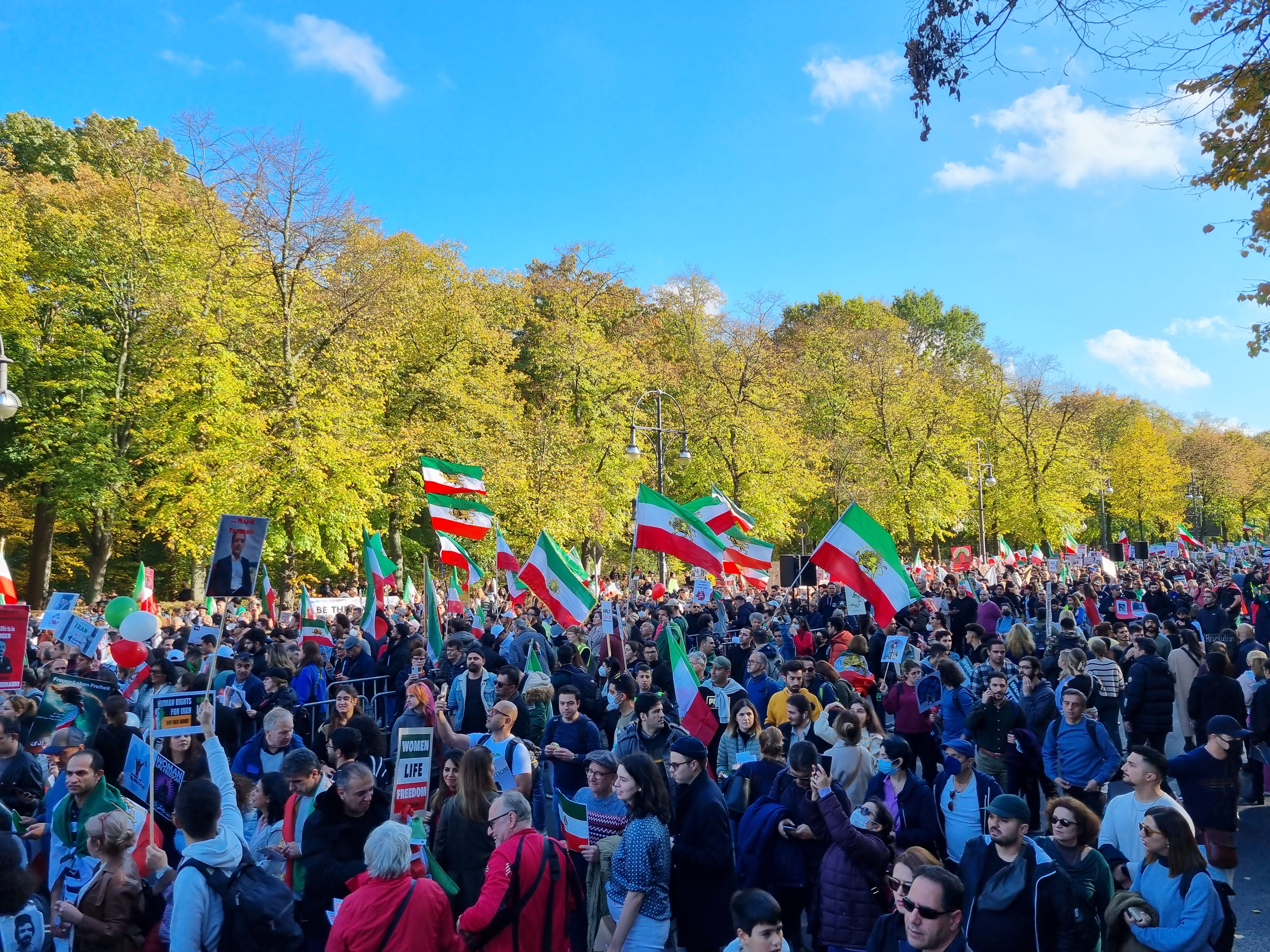
A solidarity protest in Germany, 22 October 2022

According to the BBC, as of November 2022, Western grassroots public opinion is strongly on the side of the protesters. For Western governments, the protests compete for priority with other issues such as Iranian nuclearization and Iranian arms shipments to Russia. Many international NGOs have explicitly condemned Iran's government for the violent crackdown, but the United Nations has declined to follow suit, instead limiting itself to statements of concern.

Iranian authorities were defiant, President Ebrahim Raisi proclaimed that "Enemies want to create a new sedition by riding the wave of livelihood and economic demands of the people; But people are alert and will not allow abuse while raising their demands", and canceled an interview in New York with a CNN correspondent when she refused his last minute demand to wear hijab. (Note: On 22 September, CNN's chief international anchor Christiane Amanpour was scheduled to interview President Raisi in New York City, following his appearance at the United Nations general assembly. Amanpour planned to speak with Raisi about several international issues, including Amini's death and the ensuing protests. The interview would have been the first time Raisi spoke with US media on American soil. Forty minutes after the interview was set to begin and before Raisi arrived, an aide to the Iranian leader made a last-minute request and stated that the meeting would not happen unless Amanpour wore a headscarf, referring to "the situation in Iran" and calling it "a matter of respect". Amanpour responded that she could not agree to the "unprecedented and unexpected condition" and later reflected on the situation, saying that when conducting interviews outside of Iran, "I have never been asked by any Iranian president ... to wear a head scarf".)

On 24 September, the Foreign Ministry of Iran summoned the ambassadors of the UK and Norway, over of what it considered their "interventionist stance". In particular, the Iranian authorities protested the "hostility" allegedly created by Farsi-language London-based media outlets, as well as the statements made by Iranian-born president of the Norwegian parliament Masud Gharahkhani, in support of the protests.

Iran has alleged that Kurdish groups in Iraq have supported the protests, and has launched attacks on Iraq's Kurdistan region. A 28 September drone and missile attack on an Iranian-Kurdish opposition group in Iraq killed at least 14, including an American and her newborn. The U.S. condemned the attack and threatened further sanctions against Iran. As of 5 October 2022, Iranian attacks (mainly artillery strikes) on Kurdish Iraq were still continuing.

In Europe and North America (and India as well) in the first months of the protests, thousands of protesters demonstrated in solidarity with Iranian protesters. On the one year anniversary of Mahsa Amini's death, thousands of people took to the streets around the world to demonstrate.

=== International organizations ===
- European Union: The European External Action Service (EEAS) condemned Amini's death in a statement and called for the Iranian government to "ensure that fundamental rights of its citizens are respected". On 4 October, EU foreign policy chief Josep Borrell said the EU was considering sanctions against Iran. By 7 October, Denmark, France, Germany, and Italy had called for EU sanctions against Iran.
- United Nations: UN Secretary-General António Guterres, on 27 September, issued a statement calling on Iranian security forces to "refrain from using unnecessary or disproportionate force". Nada al-Nashif, the acting UN High Commissioner for Human Rights, expressed concern over Amini's death and Iranian authorities' response to the resulting protests. Ravina Shamdasani, the spokesperson for the UN High Commission for Human Rights, urged Iran's clerical leadership several days later to "fully respect the rights to freedom of opinion, expression, peaceful assembly, and association". Shamdasani added that reports specify that "hundreds have also been arrested, including human rights defenders, lawyers, civil society activists, and at least 18 journalists", and "Thousands have joined anti-government demonstrations throughout the country over the past 11 days. Security forces have responded at times with live ammunition". On 22 November the Office of the High Commissioner for Human Rights stated that more than 300 people including 40 minors have been killed so far by the Iranian government since the start of the protests; throughout the country and in 25 out of 31 of its provinces.

=== Diplomatic ties ===
In March 2023, Iran and Saudi Arabia announced that they would re-establish diplomatic ties after years of hostility. It was reported that one of Tehran's key demands was reportedly for Riyadh to "tone down" the Saudi-backed, anti-Islamic Republic Persian language news television Iran International. This regional realignment has been described as brought on by the unrest and once seemed "unthinkable".

=== Human rights advocates ===
International human rights groups such as the Iran Human Rights, Human Rights Watch, and the UN Acting High Commissioner for Human Rights Nada al-Nashif, issued statements of concern. In late September Human Rights Watch raised specific concerns about the use of teargas and lethal force to disperse protesters, "dubious national security charges" against arrested protesters and "grossly unfair" trials protesters were subject to.

In October 2022, Amnesty International protested that "Iranian authorities have repeatedly shown utter disregard for the sanctity of human life and will stop at nothing to preserve power", and called on UN member states to "urgently establish an independent investigative and accountability mechanism for the most serious crimes under international law committed in Iran".

=== Sanctions ===
On 22 September, the United States Department of the Treasury announced sanctions against the Morality Police as well as seven senior leaders of Iran's various security organizations, "for violence against protesters and the death of Mahsa Amini". These include Mohammad Rostami Cheshmeh Gachi, chief of Iran's Morality Police, and Kioumars Heydari, commander of the Iranian army's ground force, in addition to the Iranian Minister of Intelligence Esmaeil Khatib, Haj Ahmad Mirzaei, head of the Tehran division of the Morality Police, Salar Abnoush, deputy commander of the Basij militia, and two law enforcement commanders, Manouchehr Amanollahi and Qasem Rezaei of the Law Enforcement Command of Islamic Republic of Iran in Chaharmahal and Bakhtiari province. The sanctions would involve blocking any properties or interests in property within the jurisdiction of the U.S., and reporting them to the U.S. Treasury. Penalties would be imposed on any parties that facilitate transactions or services to the sanctioned entities. On 6 October, the U.S. sanctioned seven Iranian government officials involved with the protest crackdowns.

On 26 September, Canadian Prime Minister Justin Trudeau stated that his government would impose sanctions on the Morality Police, its leadership, and the officials responsible for Amini's death and the crackdown on the protesters. On 3 October, the sanctions became official when Foreign Affairs Minister Mélanie Joly announced sanctions targeting nine entities, including the Morality Police and the Iranian Ministry of Intelligence and Security, and 25 individuals, that include high-ranking officials and members of the IRGC. These individuals include Mohammed Bagheri, chief of staff of Iran's armed forces, IRGC Commander-in-Chief Major General Hossein Salami, and Esmail Qaani, commander of the Quds Force of the IRGC. On 7 October, the Canadian government expanded the sanctions, banning 10,000 members of the IRGC from entering the country permanently, which represents the top 50% of the organization's leadership. The Prime Minister, Justin Trudeau, stated that Canada planned to expand the sanctions against those most responsible for Iran's "egregious behavior". Canadian Deputy Prime Minister, Chrystia Freeland, stated that Iran was a "state sponsor of terror", and that "it is oppressive, theocratic and misogynist; The IRGC leadership are terrorists, the IRGC is a terrorist organization".

On 10 October, the United Kingdom applied sanctions on Iranian officials with Foreign Secretary James Cleverly stating that the United Kingdom meant to "send a clear message to the Iranian authorities — we will hold you to account for your repression of women and girls, and for the shocking violence you have inflicted on your own people." Also on 10 October, Deutsche Welle reported that the European Union was working behind the scenes to prepare a sanctions package against Iran. The German foreign minister Annalena Baerbock promised that the EU would issue travel bans and asset freezing against Iranian officials trying to suppress the protests. Bijan Djir-Sarai, spokesperson of the German Free Democratic Party, urged the organization to "quickly adopt powerful sanctions that target the Iranian oligarchy", including members of Iran's Morality Police, Iran's Revolutionary Guard Corps and other loyalists of the Islamic regime, "who are responsible for serious human rights violations".

On 13 October, Canada imposed new sanctions on Iran's government entities and seventeen government-affiliated figures, stating "the actions of the Iranian regime speak for themselves – the world has watched for years as it has pursued its agenda of violence, fear and propaganda" (...) Canada will continue to defend human rights and we will continue to stand in solidarity with the Iranian people, including women and youth, who are courageously demanding a future where their human rights will be fully respected." The figures listed include former foreign minister Javad Zarif, army general Amir Hatami, and Saeed Mortazavi, an Iranian prosecutor whom Canada holds accountable for the torture (and in turn, death) of Canadian-Iranian journalist Zahra Kazemi.

On 17 October, the EU sanctioned eleven individuals and four entities in Iran, including the Basij and the morality police.

The Guardian (on 18 October) characterized international sanctions as "largely symbolic".

On 12 December, the New Zealand Government imposed travel bans on 22 members of the Iranian security forces connected to Mahsa Amini's death and the suppression of the protests. Individuals affected by the ban have included Iranian Revolutionary Guard Corps Commander-in-Chief Hossein Salami, Basij Commander Gholamreza Soleimani, Law Enforcement Command chief commander Hossein Ashtari, and Guidance Patrol Commander Mohammed Rostami.

== In popular culture ==
=== Music ===
On 28 September, Shervin Hajipour released the song "Baraye" as a music video which went viral online on multiple platforms, and was viewed by millions of people. Hajipour was arrested days later on 4 October, and then released on bail after he deleted the original video. Several media outlets have called it "the anthem of the protests". Shahin Najafi released the song "Hashtadia" ("The Eighties' [Children]", i.e. the young people born in the 1380s H.S. / the year 2002 onwards), and other Iranians who have published protest songs include Hichkas (the "father of Iranian rap"), Toomaj Salehi (arrested), and Kurdish rapper Saman Yasin (arrested, sentenced to execution).

=== Sports ===
Following the arrest of retired captain Hossein Mahini, some members of Persepolis F.C. reportedly wore black armbands at a match, and were later summoned by security, according to Iran International. In October 2022, fans of Borussia Dortmund unveiled banners in support of Sarina Esmailzadeh and the women of Iran. During the November 2022 Beach Soccer Intercontinental Cup, members of the Iranian beach soccer team were filmed not singing along to the national anthem. Player Saeed Piramoon imitated cutting his hair to show support for the protests and calling for greater freedoms for Iranian women during celebrations for scoring the winning goal. During the December 2022 Wrestling World Cup in Iowa, Iranian fans continued their protests against the Iranian government, despite event organizers banning all flags, signs and banners.

During the 2022 IFSC Climbing Asian Championships held in Seoul in mid-October, Iranian climber Elnaz Rekabi received international attention for competing without a hijab. She returned to Tehran. She was greeted as heroine by a cheering crowd at Tehran airport, arriving with a baseball cap and hoodie. Rekabi stated that the act was not intended to be symbolic, claiming publicly that she had been in a hurry and that her headscarf had fallen off accidentally. Human rights organisations and activists suggested that Rekabi had been coerced by the Iranian authorities. As of 21 October 2022, Rekabi was under house arrest according to BBC News and France 24, while Iranian authorities stated that Rekabi was at her home because she was "in need of rest".

Handball player Sajjad Esteki, women's rugby captain Fereshteh Sarani, fencer Mojtaba Abedini Shourmasti and taekwondo artist Mahsa Sadeghi have all quit their respective national teams in protest, with Olympic wrestler Rasoul Khadem stating his support.

On 4 January 2023, Iranian referee Alireza Faghani decided to represent Football Australia as one of Australia's referees, which was due to his decision to support the protests, which led to Faghani being stripped of his Iranian referee status by his country's federation.

In 2023 prior to that year's Women's World Cup in Australia and New Zealand, the Brazilian team flew on a Boeing 787 Dreamliner chartered from Enrique Piñeyro that had images of both Mahsa Amini and Amir Reza Nasr Azadani, an Iranian men's footballer currently imprisoned for 26 years and facing the death penalty for supporting the protests on its tail wing, while the fuselage had the messages “No woman should be forced to cover her head”, "No woman should be killed for not covering her head", and “No man should be hanged for saying this” added as decals.

==== 2022 FIFA World Cup ====
The Iranian football team wore black jackets without logos during their 27 September World Cup preparation friendly against Senegal; their team uniforms underneath with their team logos were not visible. Given that some team members had tweeted solidarity with the protesters, the jackets were widely interpreted as a further showing of solidarity with the protesters.

During the first match of the Iranian soccer team for the 2022 FIFA World Cup against England on 21 November, the team appeared to engage in silent protest in solidarity with the protesters by refusing to sing their national anthem as is customary before each match. Video footage seemed to show some Iranian fans booing the anthem as it played, with some Iranian supporters cheering against their own team or boycotting their team amidst the ongoing protests as they felt the team was representing the government. Before the match, the team captain Ehsan Hajsafi and the midfielder Saman Ghoddos both offered words of support to the protesters and the movement.

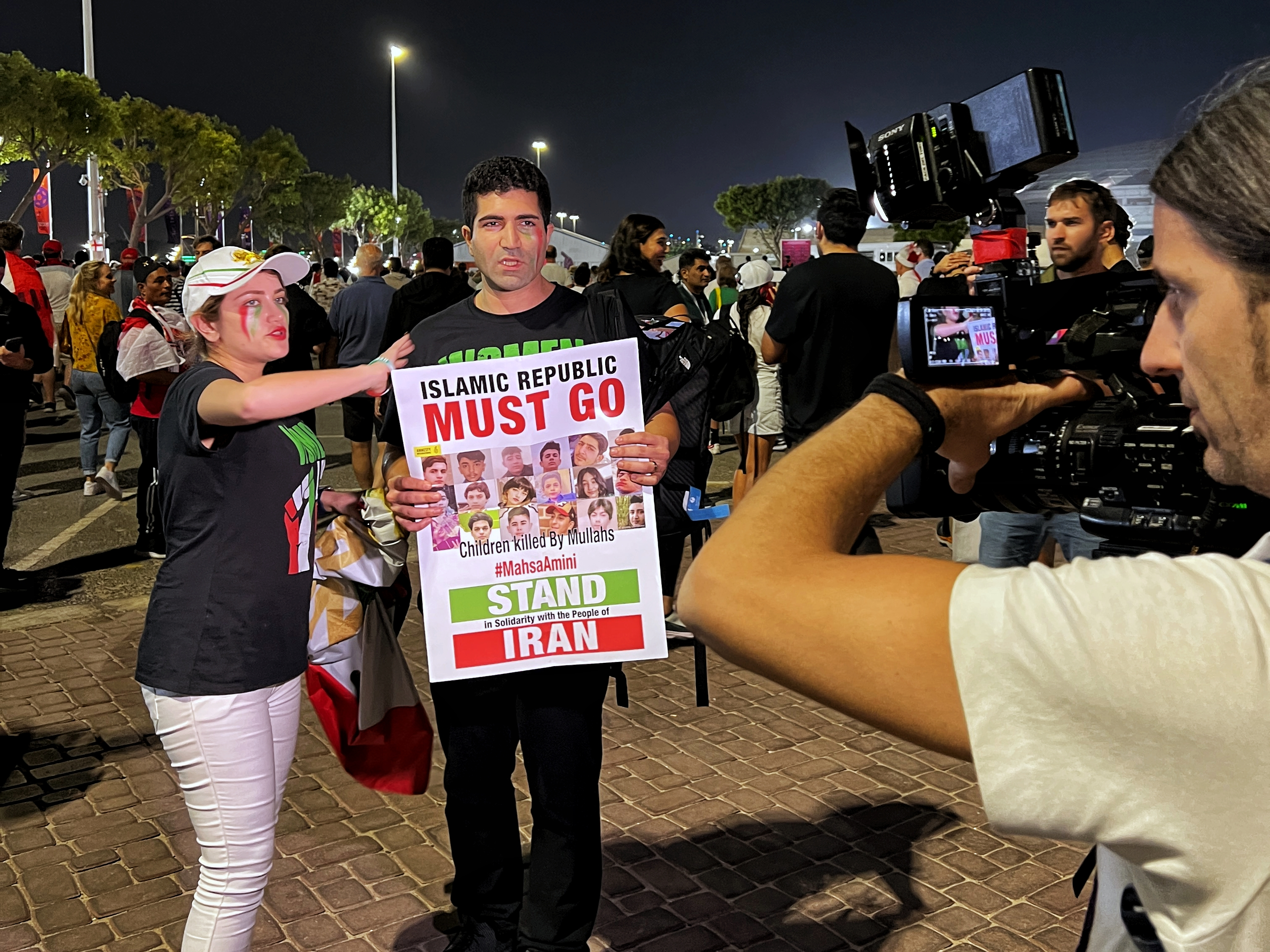
An Iranian fan with a protest banner at the World Cup

Iran's national team had been put under high pressure to support the protesters and had been criticised for not doing enough. Some fans accused the team of siding with the government's crackdown against protesters. The team's coach, Carlos Queiroz, had been angered over what the players had been experiencing behind the scenes, saying they even have received threats. He asked to "let the kids play the game", and told the Iranian fans after the England game to "stay at home" if they can't support the team.

In the following match against Wales, the Iranian players were filmed singing the national anthem, amidst the boos and whistles from the Iranian supporters. Some protesters had their pre-revolutionary Lion and Sun flags and Woman, Life, Freedom banners snatched from them by pro-government fans and stadium security at the Ahmad bin Ali Stadium. Protesters were harassed by government supporters with some protesters being detained by Qatari police, while stadium security confirmed they were given orders to confiscate anything but the flag of the Islamic Republic of Iran. Documents obtained by Iran International showed Iran was coordinating secret efforts with Qatar to control who attends the World Cup and restrict any signs of dissent.

Prior to Iran's final group stage match against the United States, Iran's state-run media called for the U.S. team to be expelled from the tournament after the U.S. Soccer Federation removed the Islamic Republic emblem from Iran's flag in a social media post. The U.S. Federation confirmed it had done so to show support for Iranian protesters before deleting the post.

On 28 November, ahead of Iran's match against the United States, the Iranian players were reportedly called in to a meeting with members of the IRGC and were threatened with violence and torture for their families if they did not sing the national anthem or joined the protests against the Iranian regime. On 24 November, however, prior to the match against Wales, Mehdi Taremi denied they had come under pressure from their government after their anthem protest in the England match. On 28 November, Iran's judiciary announced it has released more than 700 prisoners following the victory over Wales.

Before the match against the United States, the Iranian players sang the national anthem again before losing to the United States 1–0 and thereby being knocked out of the tournament. Many Iranians celebrated the defeat; in Bandar-e Anzali, a motorist, Mehran Samak, was reportedly shot dead by security forces after he honked his horn to celebrate Iran's exit from the tournament. Many Iranians refused to support the national team at the World Cup, seeing it as an extension of the government.

After the World Cup, it was revealed that the Iranian government had dispatched paid members of the Basij and IRGC to cheer for the team in the stands at both the World Cup and the Asian Cup in order to counter the protesters.

==== Commercialism ====
At least for a while in October 2022, Balenciaga and Gucci posted the protest slogan -- "Zan, zendegi, azadi" ("Woman, life, freedom")—on their Instagram feeds.

=== Film ===
The 2024 film The Seed of the Sacred Fig, directed by Mohammad Rasoulof, is set in the midst of the death of Mahsa Amini and the protests afterwards in Iran.

== See also ==
- Aylar Haghi
- Ahoo Daryaei
- Homa Darabi
- Human rights in the Islamic Republic of Iran
- International Women's Day Protests in Tehran, 1979
- Iranian Revolution
- Killing of Neda Agha-Soltan
- List of protests in the 21st century
- My Stealthy Freedom
- 2022 Zahedan massacre
- Iranian schoolgirls mass poisoning reports
- 2025–2026 Iranian protests
