= Death of Sarina Esmailzadeh =

Death of a protester during 2022 protests in Iran

- Native name: سارینا اسماعیل ‌زاده
- Date: 23 September 2022; 3 years ago
- Location: Mehrshahr, Alborz province, Iran
- Deaths: Sarina Esmailzadeh
- Burial: Behesht-e Sakineh

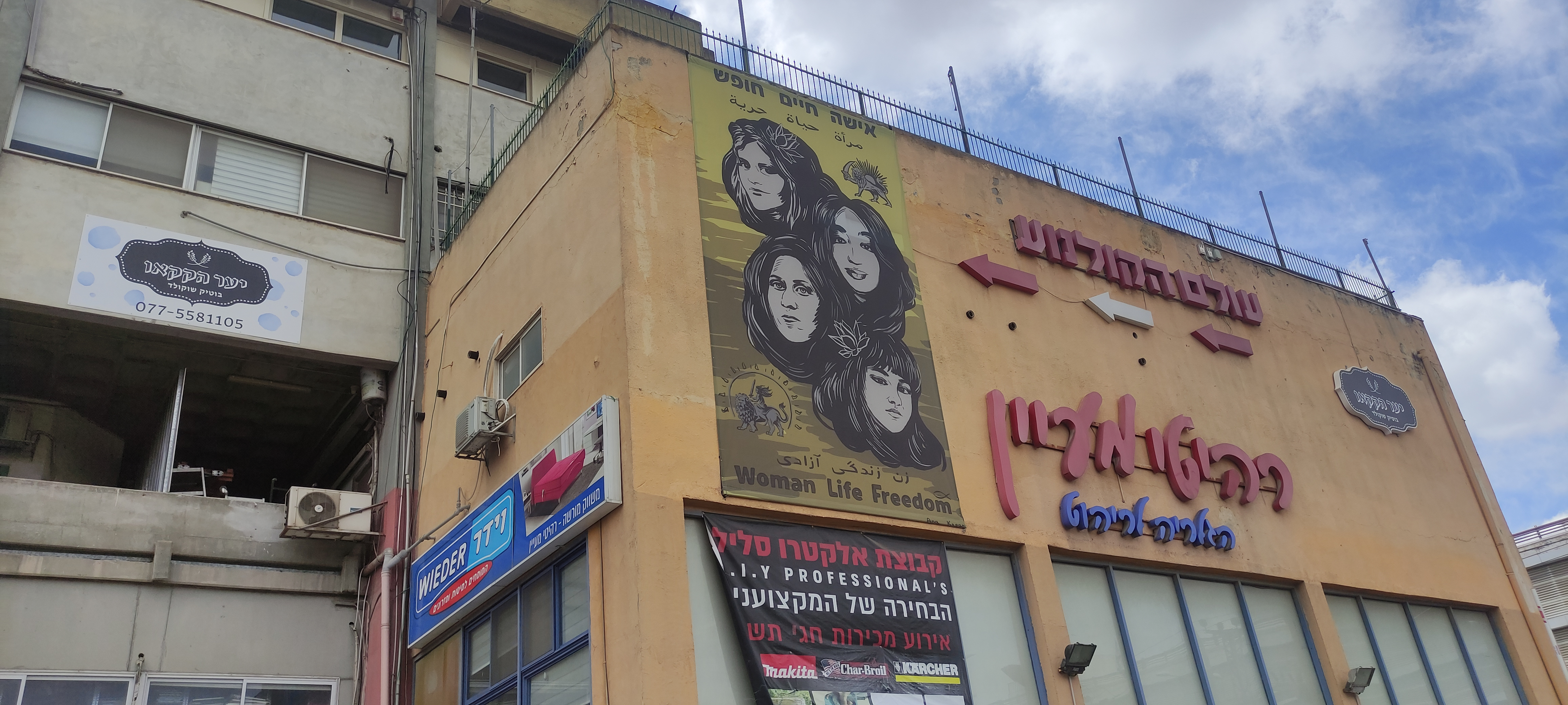
Mural with the faces of Sarina Esmaielzahdeh, Mahsa Amini, Fereshteh Ahmadi, and Nika Shakarami in Jerusalem

On 23 September 2022, Iranian teenager Sarina Esmailzadeh (Persian: سارینا اسماعیل‌زاده) died of severe beating on the head by security forces during the Mahsa Amini protests in Karaj, Alborz province, Iran, according to human rights organizations. She was 16 years old.

The local Justice Department denied any responsibility for her death, claiming that she died by suicide after jumping from the rooftop of a building, and similar claims were made by the authorities about 16-year-old Nika Shakarami who had also attended the protests and died under suspicious circumstances.

After their deaths, pictures of Shakarami and Esmailzadeh appeared on banners during protests and on posters in Iranian cities. Videos created by Esmailzadeh were shared online after her death, and hackers interrupted a government-run news broadcast in Iran with pictures of Esmailzadeh and other women killed during the protests.

== Background ==
Sarina Esmailzadeh was born in 2006. Her father died when she was a child and she was raised by her mother and had an older brother. She attended a high school in Karaj for gifted students, and could speak English and French in addition to her native Persian.

Esmailzadeh was also a YouTuber who created videos with her talking about topics such as music, food, and school, as well as restrictions on women in Iran. In one of her videos, after finishing school exams, she stated "Nothing feels better than freedom". In a YouTube video posted on May 22, she talked about restrictions on women in Iran and a need for freedom. In another video, she said, "We're not like the previous generation 20 years ago who didn't know what life was like outside Iran." In her last video on Telegram, she sang along to "Take Me to Church" by Hozier, and said, "My homeland feels like being in exile".

On September 23, Esmailzadeh is reported to have attended a protest with friends and then did not return home. After her death, her videos were shared online, and the video of her singing along to the Hozier song was widely shared.

== Circumstances of death ==
According to Amnesty International and Iran Human Rights, Esmailzadeh was struck on the head repeatedly with a baton and bled to death. in the Gohardasht neighborhood of Karaj, near her language school where protests were taking place. According to an IHR source, she died before she could be taken anywhere for treatment. The family was notified about her death later that evening by her friends who were with her at the protests. Her family was under pressure from security and intelligence agents to stay silent on the matter, especially in regards to communication with foreign media, and to support the authorities' version of the events. Similar pressures were exerted on the families of other victims of the protests.

=== Cover-up ===
According to Iran International, the Iranian authorities tried to cover up the circumstances of her death. On October 6, after reports spread on social media about her death, an Iranian official said Esmailzadeh had died by suicide after jumping from the roof of a building, and that family members of Esmailzadeh went to a prosecutor's office about the social media reports stating Esmailzadeh was killed during a protest. On October 7, the government-affiliated Tasnim News Agency aired a video that showed her mother stating Esmailzadeh had once attempted suicide with pills. The authenticity of the video of her mother has been disputed.

According to family acquaintances, more than 50 security agents were present at her funeral and prevented video recording. Her mother was quoted to tell every attendant that Esmailzadeh fell from a building roof, even without them asking. Her death certificate was taken by the authorities but never returned to the family, whose phones are being monitored. The family's lawyer was not allowed access to the case file of the investigation into Esmailzadeh's death, according to IHR.

Esmailzadeh's phone was never returned to her family, her Telegram channels' posts were edited after her death to show a depressed image of her with suicide tendencies. Some of her pinned messages were deleted as well. Her Instagram page was initially deleted after her death, but later 13 pages were created in her name, one with her original ID without her old posts. Only her YouTube channel shows an image of a lively happy teenager who loved dancing, music and pizza with a concern for freedom.

Esmailzadeh's mother repeatedly attempted to retrieve her daughter's body. She was mocked by security forces, who said that her daughter was a terrorist. After finally seeing Esmailzadeh's body, some news sources claim that she hanged herself at her home.

== Legacy ==
In 2023, Amnesty International UK honored what would have been her seventeenth birthday on 2 July.

In 2026, Irish rock band U2 released the EP Days of Ash. It includes "Song of the Future", which was written as a tribute to Sarina Esmailzadeh.

== See also ==
- Death of Nika Shakarami
- Death of Hadis Najafi
- Death of Mahsa Amini
