= Hayat ol Gheyb =

Village in Lorestan province, Iran

Hayat ol Gheyb Persian: حيات الغيب
- Village
- Location within Iran
- Coordinates: 33°28′24″N 47°55′49″E
- Country: Iran
- Province: Lorestan
- County: Chegeni
- District: Veysian
- Rural District: Veysian

Population (2016)
  - Total: 244
- Time zone: UTC+3:30 (IRST)

Hayat ol Gheyb (Persian: حيات الغيب) (Note: Also romanized as Ḩayāt ol Gheyb; also known as Emāmzādeh Ḩayāt ol Ghīāb, Emāmzādeh Seyyed Moḩammad Hayāt ol Gheyb, and Imāmzādeh Hayāt al Ghā‘ib) is a village in Veysian Rural District of Veysian District in Chegeni County, (Note: Formerly Dowreh County) Lorestan province, Iran.

== Demographics ==
=== Population ===
At the time of the 2006 National Census, the village's population was 287 in 71 households, when it was in Khorramabad County. The following census in 2011 counted 266 people in 82 households, by which time the district had been separated from the county in the establishment of Dowreh County. (Note: Renamed Chegeni County) The 2016 census measured the population of the village as 244 people in 83 households.
