= Keshavarz Boulevard =

Road in Tehran, Iran

Coordinates: 35°42′29″N 51°23′37″E

Keshavarz Boulevard بلوار کشاورز
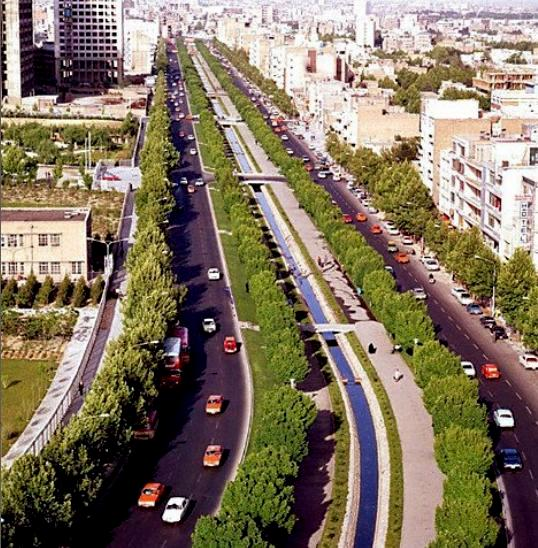
- A view of Keshavarz Boulevard of Tehran in the mid-1970s (West to East view)
- Interactive map of Keshavarz Boulevard بلوار کشاورز
- Length: 2.2 km (1.4 mi)
- Location: Tehran, Iran

Keshavarz Boulevard (Blvd.) (Persian: بلوار کشاورز Bolvār e Keshāvarz) or simply Bolvār (the Boulevard) is a central Boulevard in Tehran, Iran. It is a 2.2km long, East-West boulevard which connects Valiasr Street and Valiasr Sq. to Imam Khomeini Hospital Complex and is located in District 6 of Tehran. During the Pahlavi era, it was named "Elizabeth Boulevard" after Queen Elizabeth II's visit to Iran. However, following the 1979 Revolution, it was renamed Keshavarz (meaning "farmer" in Persian) Boulevard, as the main building of the Ministry of Agriculture of Iran was located nearby.

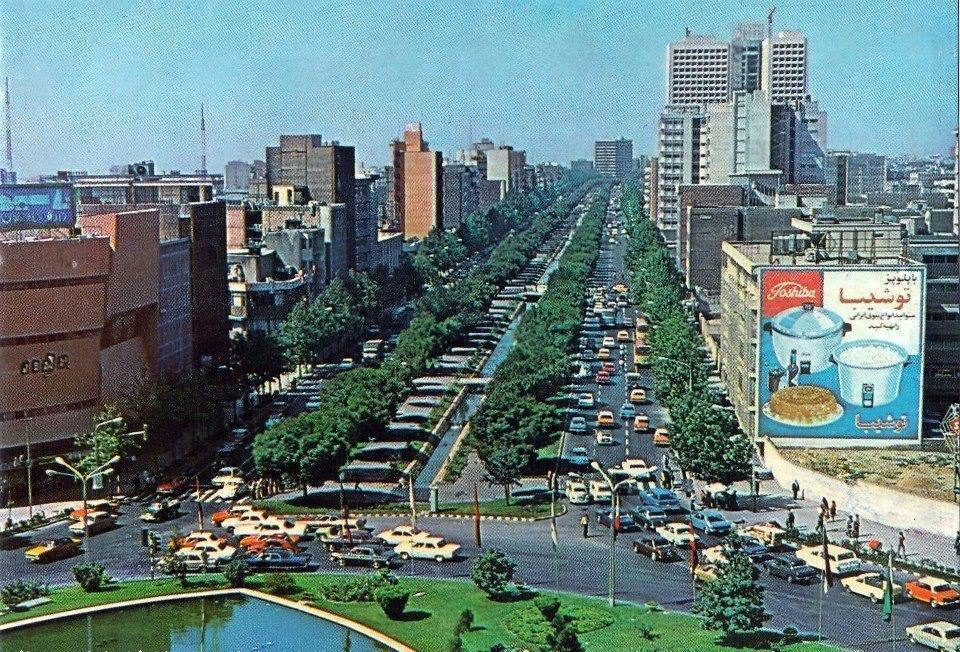
Keshavarz Boulevard in the mid-1970s (East to West view)

There are many buildings, organizations and offices all along the boulevard including various banks, hotels, hospitals as well as the Ministry of Agriculture building, and University of Tehran. One of Tehran's largest parks, Laleh Park, also borders the boulevard.
