= Atefeh Naami =

Iranian woman who disappeared during 2022

- عاطفه نعامى
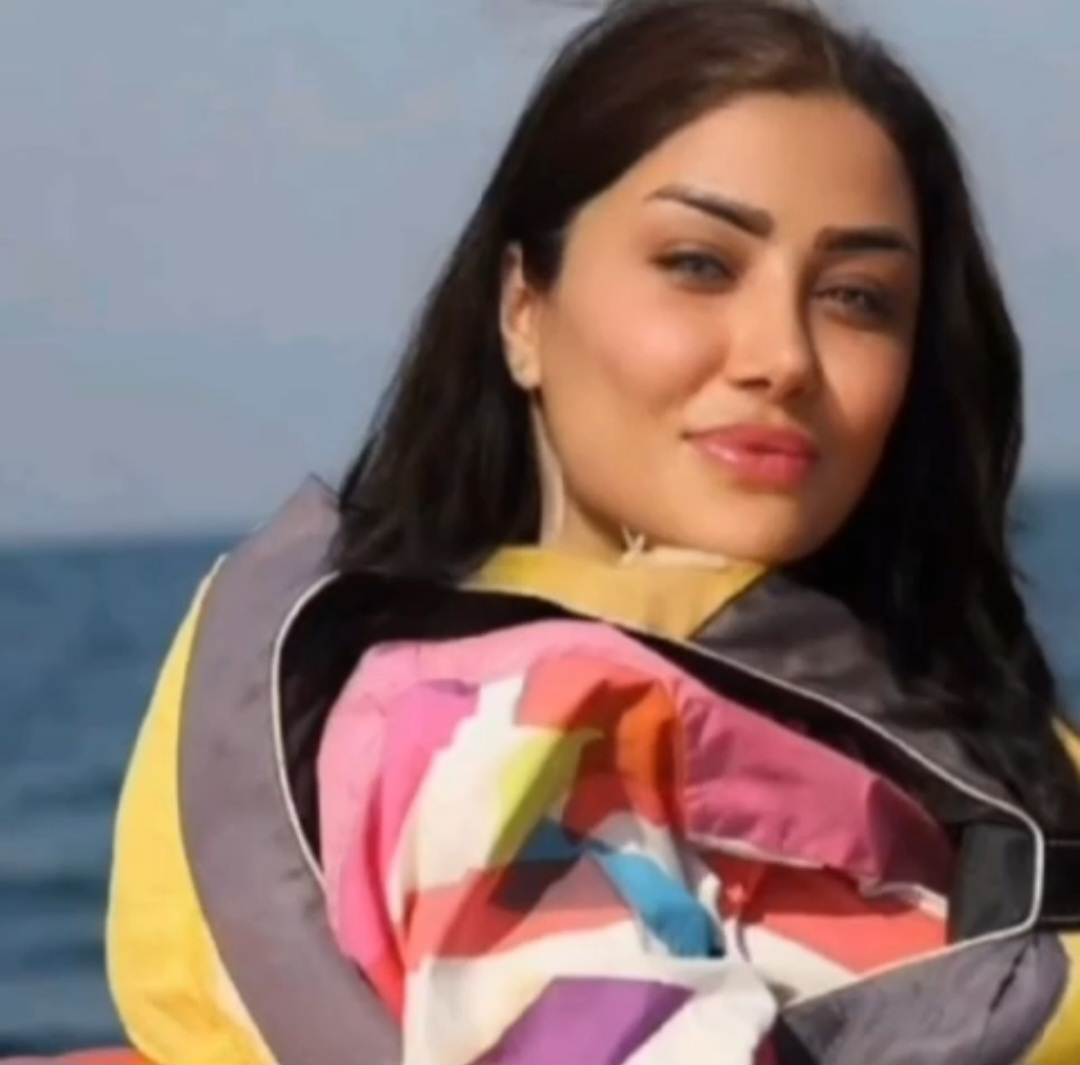
- Born: 7 August 1985; Ahvaz, Iran
- Died: 21 November 2022 (aged 37); Karaj, Iran
- Burial place: Ahvaz, Iran
- Known for: Killed in the 2022 Iranian protests

Atefeh Naami (Persian: عاطفه نعامی) was a 37-year-old Iranian woman who disappeared in Karaj on 21 November 2022 during the 2022 Iranian protests following the death of Mahsa Amini. Her family was informed of her death five days later. She had died under suspicious circumstances suspected to involve violence by the repressive forces of the Islamic Republic of Iran. Finally, on 28 November 2022, she was secretly buried in Behesht Abaad cemetery in Ahvaz by the security officers of the Islamic Republic.

Iranian Human Rights Center quoted Naami's family and wrote: "Despite the fact that the effects of injuries were evident on Atefeh's lifeless body, the security institutions of the Islamic Republic issued an order to bury her immediately." Mohammad Amin Naami, the brother of Atefeh Naami, has stated in an interview with several media that on Monday, 28 November, his sister's body was buried by deceiving the family members and in silence. He added: "Atefeh's lifeless body was secretly buried by the security officers on the morning of Monday, 28 November 2022, while the family was told that the funeral would be at noon." The injured body of Atefeh Naami was put under a blanket by the government agents by staging a suicide and putting a water heater gas hose in her mouth and left her on the balcony of her apartment located in Azimiyeh, Karaj. Naami's family has definitely denied her suicide.

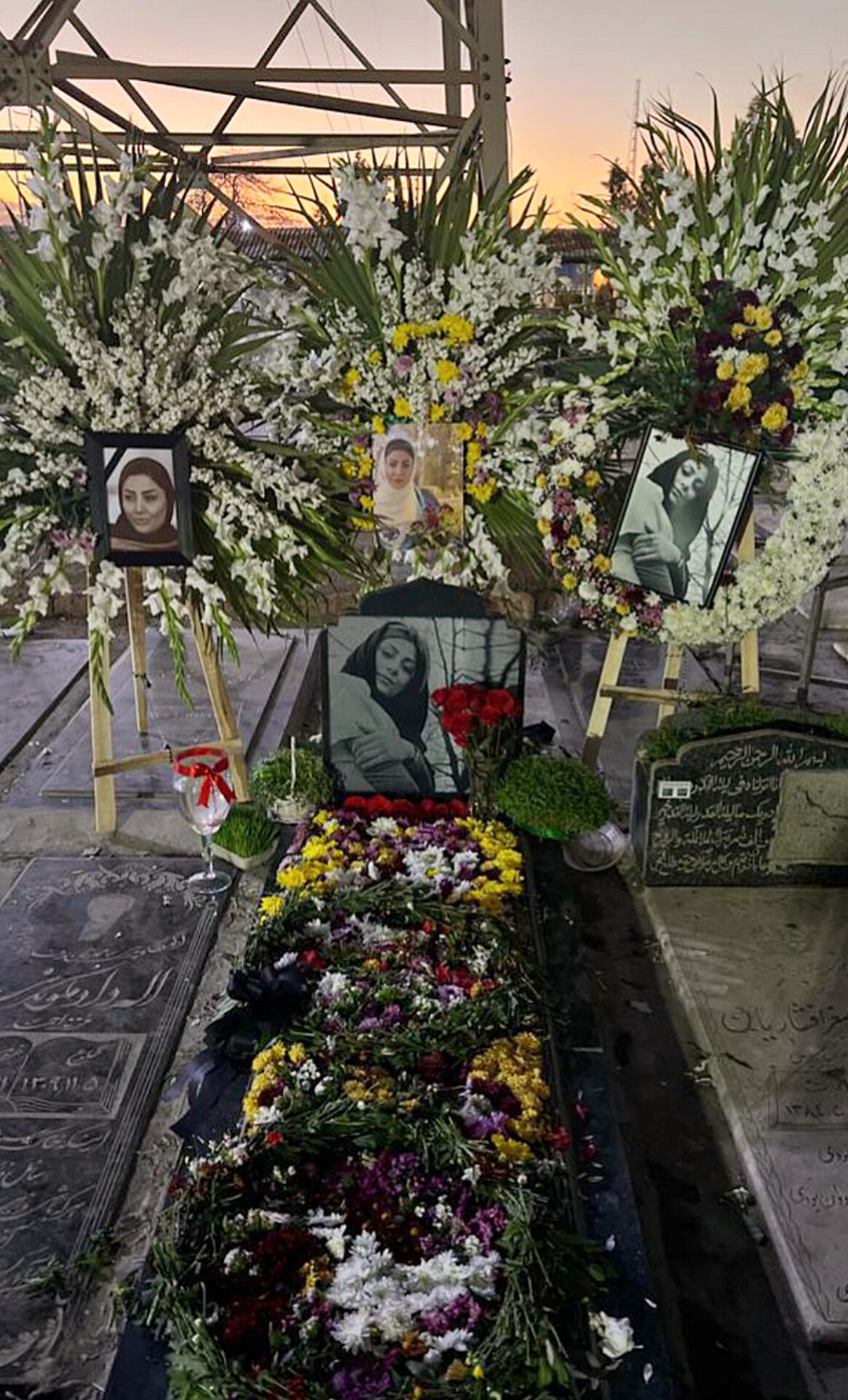
The tomb of Atefeh Naami

== Background ==
Atefeh Naami was born on 7 August 1985, in Ahvaz and was ethnically Arab. She graduated Architecture from Islamic Azad University of Ahvaz, then she moved to Karaj. Before she was killed by the forces of the Islamic Republic of Iran, she was a resident of the Azimiyeh area of Karaj. She was known among her relatives and friends for doing charitable work, and according to close relatives, she had an independent spirit and was full of hope for life. During the Mahsa Amini protests in Iran, Atefeh Naami chanted the slogan of woman, life, freedom on the balcony of her apartment and worked to encourage women to social struggle and get their lost rights. When her sister told her, "Atefeh take care", she tells her: "My blood is not more colorful than others."

== Circumstances of death ==
Atefeh Naami was an active participant in the Mahsa Amini protests. She distributed the slogan of woman, life, freedom and Mahsa Amini's hashtag among the people in handwritten form. The approximate time of her death has been announced by the medical examiner as 21 November 2022. Her damaged body was found on the balcony of her apartment in Azimiyeh, Karaj after five days on 26 November. The government agents had staged suicide and placed her body under a blanket and left her on the balcony of her apartment in Karaj by putting a water heater gas hose in her mouth. Although the marks of injuries were evident on her body, the security agencies ordered her immediate burial. Naami's family has denied suicide. Finally, on 28 November 2022, the lifeless body of Atefeh Naami was buried by the security officers of the Islamic Republic, secretly and with deception and despite the opposition of the family members, in the Behesht Abaad cemetery of Ahvaz, plot 5, row 2.

== Day 40 of her death ==
Atefeh Naami's 40th death ceremony was held on 29 December 2022, in spite of strict security measures and the pressure of the government forces of the Islamic Republic on her family in Behesht Abaad cemetery, Ahvaz. The security officers did not allow the 40th anniversary ceremony of Atefeh Naami. Finally, with numerous threats and pressures, her family was forced to hold the 40th ceremony earlier than the original date. This event became a scene of anti-government protests at the same time as the 40th ceremony of Hamidreza Rouhi, a young protester who had also been killed protesting. A number of women participating in this ceremony took off their hijab. According to the images obtained by the BBC media, it shows that on 29 December, coinciding with the 40th anniversary of Atefeh Naami, a group of Iranians living in Australia also held a protest rally in front of the Melbourne Parliament in her memory.

== Reactions ==
Following the murder of Atefeh Naami by the government, despite the pressure of the security forces, some of her close relatives -who lived outside of Iran- did not remain silent and gave interviews and conversations with various media. Journalist, writer and women's rights activist Masih Alinejad wrote about the murder of Atefeh Naami: "We will not forget you, remember..." Parastoo Salehi, an actor and movie star, added on his Instagram page: "What are you doing with the children of this land in prisons?!" Sepideh Moafi, an Iranian-American actress, and Dr. Nina Ansary, an Iranian-American historian, author and egalitarian rights activist for women and men, reacted on their Twitter page. Also, Ali Karimi, Sahar Moghads (singer), Mehdi Rostampour and a significant number of social media discussed the issue of Atefeh Naami's government murder.

== See also ==
- Death of Mahsa Amini
- Mahsa Amini Protests
- Deaths during the Mahsa Amini protests
- Woman, Life, Freedom
