= Chastity =

Ethic concept of temperance related to sexuality

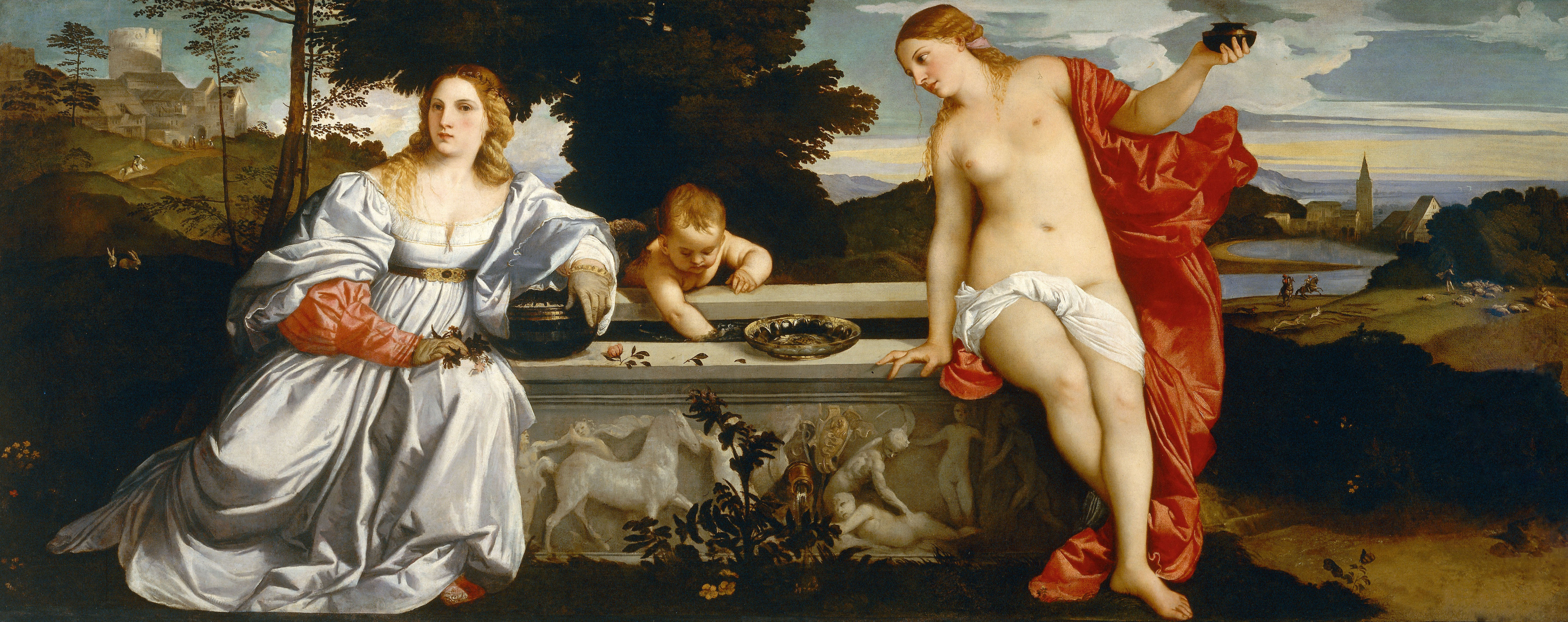
Sacred and Profane Love (1514-15) by Titian

Chastity, also known as purity, is a virtue related to temperance. Someone who is chaste refrains from sexual activity that is considered immoral or from any sexual activity, according to their state of life. In some contexts, for example when making a vow of chastity, chastity means celibacy.

== Etymology ==
The words chaste and chastity stem from the Latin adjective Castus ("cut off", "separated", "pure"). The words entered the English language around the middle of the 13th century. Chaste meant "virtuous", "pure from unlawful sexual intercourse" or (from the early 14th century on) as a noun, a virgin, while chastity meant "(sexual) purity".

Thomas Aquinas links castus (chastity) to the Latin verb castigo ("chastise, reprimand, correct"), with a reference to Aristotle's Nicomachean Ethics: "Chastity takes its name from the fact that reason 'chastises' concupiscence, which, like a child, needs curbing, as the Philosopher states".

== In Abrahamic religions ==
For many Orthodox Jews, Christians, Muslims, and Bahá’í - people should restrict their acts of a sexual nature to the context of marriage. For unmarried people, chastity is equivalent to sexual abstinence. Sexual acts outside of or apart from marriage, such as adultery, fornication, masturbation, and prostitution, are considered immoral due to lust.

=== Christianity ===
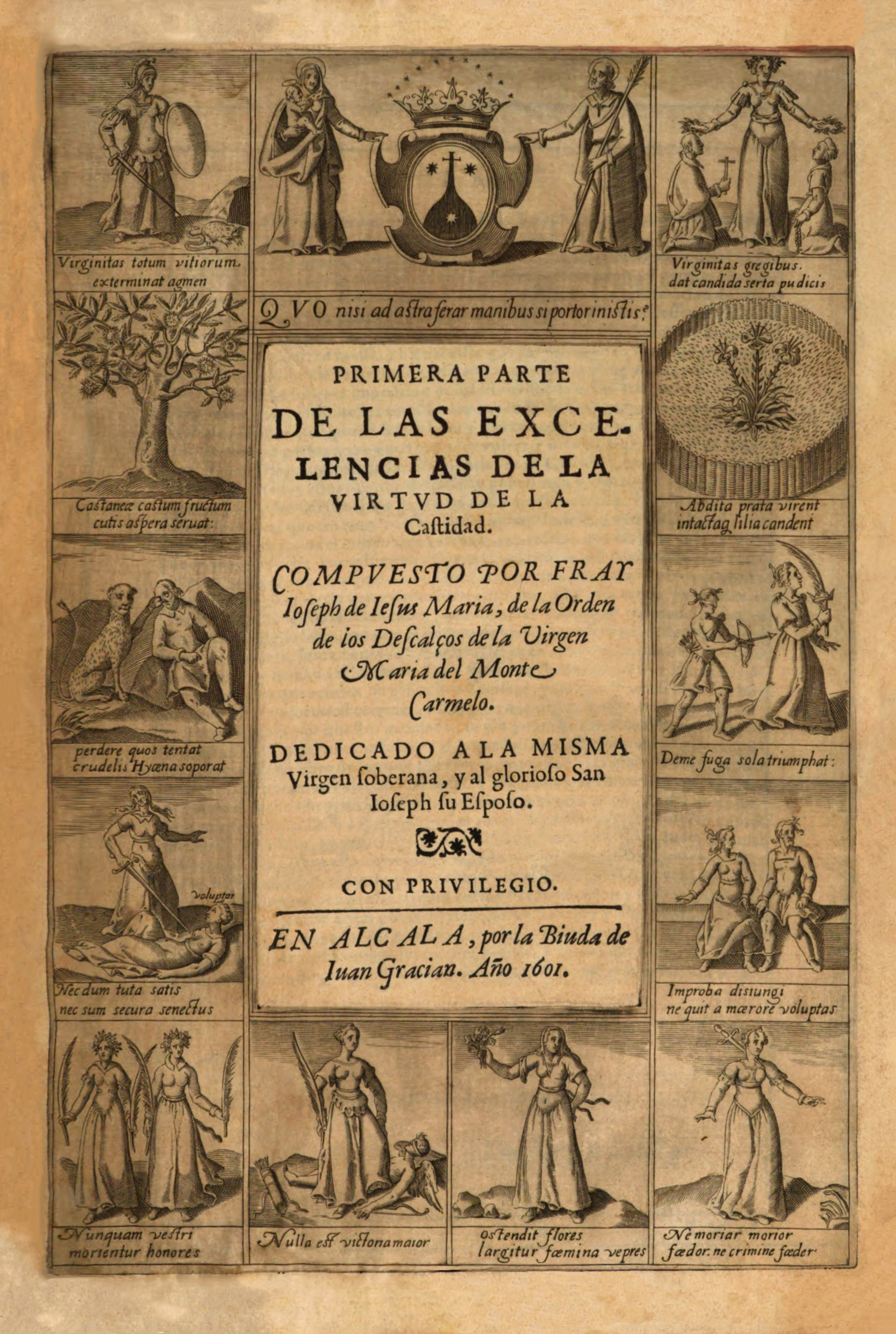
"Of the excellences of the virtue of Chastity" (José de Jesús María, 1601)

==== Traditions ====
In many Christian traditions, chastity is synonymous with purity. The Catholic Church teaches that chastity involves, in the words of cardinal bishop Alfonso López Trujillo, "the successful integration of sexuality within the person and thus the inner unity of man in his bodily and spiritual being", which according to one's marital status requires either having no sexual relationship, or only having sexual relations with one's spouse. In Western Christian morality, chastity is placed opposite the deadly sin of lust, and is classified as one of seven virtues. The moderation of sexual desires is also required to be virtuous. Reason, will, and desire can harmoniously work together to do what is good.

As an emblem of inward chastity, some Christians choose to wear a cord, girdle or a cincture of one of the several Confraternities of the Cord or a purity ring. The cord is worn as a symbol of chastity in honour of a chaste saint whom the bearer asks for intercession. The purity ring is worn before holy matrimony by those who marry or for the rest of their lives by those who stay single.

==== Marital chastity ====
In marriage, the spouses commit to a lifelong relationship that excludes sexual intimacy with other persons. A third form of chastity, often called "vidual chastity", is expected by the society for a period after the woman's husband dies. For example, Anglican Bishop Jeremy Taylor defined five rules in Holy Living (1650), including abstaining from marrying "so long as she is with child by her former husband" and "within the year of mourning".

==== Celibacy ====
In the Roman Catholic Church, members of the consecrated life vow or promise celibacy as one of the evangelical counsels. In 306, the Synod of Elvira proscribed clergy from marrying. This was unevenly enforced until the Second Lateran Council in 1139 when it found its way into canon law. Unmarried deacons promise celibacy to their local bishop when ordained.

Eastern Catholic priests are permitted to marry, provided they do so before ordination and outside monastic life.

==== Vows of chastity ====
Vows of chastity can be taken either as part of an organised religious life (such as Roman Catholic Beguines and Beghards in the past) or on an individual basis: as a voluntary act of devotion, or as part of an ascetic lifestyle (often devoted to contemplation), or both. Some Protestant religious communities, such as the Bruderhof, take vows of chastity as part of the church membership process.

==== Teaching by denomination ====
===== Catholicism =====
Chastity is a central and pivotal concept in Roman Catholic praxis. Roman Catholic teaching regards chastity as essential in maintaining and cultivating the unity of body with spirit and thus the integrity of the human being. It is also fundamental to the practise of the Catholic life because it involves an apprenticeship in self-mastery. By attaining mastery over one's passions, reason, will, and desire can harmoniously work together to do what is good.

===== Lutheranism =====
The theology of the body of the Lutheran churches emphasizes the role of the Holy Spirit, who sanctified the bodies of Christians to be God's temple.

Many Lutheran monks (e.g. Östanbäck Monastery) and Lutheran nuns (e.g. Daughters of Mary) practice celibacy, though in some Lutheran religious orders it is not compulsory.

===== The Church of Jesus Christ of Latter-Day Saints =====
In the Church of Jesus Christ of Latter-day Saints (LDS Church) chastity is very important:

Physical intimacy between husband and wife is a beautiful and sacred part of God's plan for His children. It is an expression of love within marriage and allows husband and wife to participate in the creation of life. God has commanded that this sacred power be expressed only between a man and a woman who are legally married. The law of chastity applies to both men and women. It includes strict abstinence from sexual relations before marriage and complete fidelity and loyalty to one's spouse after marriage.

The law of chastity requires that sexual relations be reserved for marriage between a man and a woman.

In addition to reserving sexual intimacy for marriage, we obey the law of chastity by controlling our thoughts, words, and actions. Jesus Christ taught, "Ye have heard that it was said by them of old time, Thou shalt not commit adultery: but I say unto you, That whosoever looketh on a woman to lust after her hath committed adultery with her already in his heart" (Matthew 5:27–28)."

Teachings of the LDS Church also include that sexual expression within marriage is an important dimension of spousal bonding apart from, but not necessarily avoiding, its procreative result.

=== Islam ===
==== Quran ====
The most famous personal example of chastity in the Quran is the Virgin Mary (Mariam):

And ˹remember˺ the one who guarded her chastity, so We breathed into her through Our angel, ˹Gabriel,˺ making her and her son a sign for all peoples.

— Surah Al-Anbiya 21:91

screening herself off from them. Then We sent to her Our angel, ˹Gabriel,˺ appearing before her as a man, perfectly formed. She appealed, “I truly seek refuge in the Most Compassionate from you! ˹So leave me alone˺ if you are God-fearing.” He responded, “I am only a messenger from your Lord, ˹sent˺ to bless you with a pure son.” She wondered, “How can I have a son when no man has ever touched me, nor am I unchaste?”

— Surah Maryam 19:17–20

Extramarital sex is forbidden. The Quran says:

Do not go near adultery. It is truly a shameful deed and an evil way.

— Surah Al-Isra 17:32

˹They are˺ those who do not invoke any other god besides Allah, nor take a ˹human˺ life—made sacred by Allah—except with ˹legal˺ right, nor commit fornication. And whoever does ˹any of˺ this will face the penalty. Their punishment will be multiplied on the Day of Judgment, and they will remain in it forever, in disgrace. As for those who repent, believe, and do good deeds, they are the ones whose evil deeds Allah will change into good deeds. For Allah is All-Forgiving, Most Merciful.

— Surah Al-Furqan 25:68–70

In a list of commendable deeds the Quran says:

Surely ˹for˺ Muslim men and women, believing men and women, devout men and women, truthful men and women, patient men and women, humble men and women, charitable men and women, fasting men and women, men and women who guard their chastity, and men and women who remember Allah often—for ˹all of˺ them Allah has prepared forgiveness and a great reward.

— Surah Al-Ahzab 33:35

Because the sex desire is usually attained before a man is financially capable of marriage, the love to God and mindfulness of Him should be sufficient motive for chastity:

And let those who do not have the means to marry keep themselves chaste until Allah enriches them out of His bounty. And if any of those ˹bondspeople˺ in your possession desires a deed of emancipation, make it possible for them, if you find goodness in them. And give them some of Allah’s wealth which He has granted you. Do not force your ˹slave˺ girls into prostitution for your own worldly gains while they wish to remain chaste. And if someone coerces them, then after such a coercion Allah is certainly All-Forgiving, Most Merciful ˹to them˺.

— Surah An-Nur 24:33

==== Sharia (Law) ====
Chastity is mandatory in Islam. Sex outside legitimacy is prohibited, for both men and women, whether married or unmarried. The injunctions and forbiddings in Islam apply equally to men and women. The legal punishment for adultery is equal for men and women.

The prophet's prescription to the youth was:

"O young people! Whoever among you can marry, should marry, because it helps him lower his gaze and guard his modesty (i.e. his private parts from committing illegal sexual intercourse etc.), and whoever is not able to marry, should fast, as fasting diminishes his sexual power."

— Sahih al-Bukhari 5066

Chastity is an attitude and a way of life. In Islam it is both a personal and a social value. A Muslim society should not condone relations entailing or conducive to sexual license. Social patterns and practices calculated to inflame sexual desire are frowned upon by Islam, such incitements to immorality including permissive ideologies, titillating works of art, and the failure to inculcate sound moral principles in the young. At the heart of such a view of human sexuality lies the conviction that the notion of personal freedom should never be misconstrued as the freedom to flout God's laws by overstepping the bounds which, in his infinite wisdom, he has set upon the relations of the sexes.

=== Baháʼí Faith ===
Chastity is highly prized in the Baháʼí Faith. Similar to other Abrahamic religions, Baháʼí teachings call for the restriction of sexual activity to that between a wife and husband in Baháʼí marriage, and discourage members from using pornography or engaging in sexually explicit recreational activities. The concept of chastity is extended to include avoidance of alcohol and mind-altering drugs, profanity, and gaudy or immodest attire.

== In Eastern religions ==
=== Hinduism ===
Hinduism's view on premarital sex is rooted in its concept of ashrama, or the stages of life. The first of these stages, known as brahmacharya, roughly translates as chastity. Celibacy and chastity are considered the appropriate behavior for both male and female students during this stage, which precedes the stage of the married householder (grihastha). Sanyasis and Hindu monks, or sadhus, are also celibate as part of their ascetic discipline.

=== Sikhism ===
In Sikhism, premarital or extramarital sex is strictly forbidden. However, it is encouraged to marry and live as a family unit to provide and nurture children for the perpetual benefit of creation (as opposed to sannyasa, or living as a monk, which was, and remains, a common spiritual practice in India). A Sikh is encouraged not to live as a recluse, beggar, monk, nun, celibate, or in any similar vein.

=== Jainism ===
The Jain ethical code contains the vow of brahmacarya (meaning "pure conduct"), which prescribes the expectations for Jains concerning sexual activity. Brahmacarya is one of the five major and minor vows of Jainism, prescribing slightly different expectations for ascetics and laypeople, respectively.

Complete celibacy is expected only of Jain ascetics (who are also referred to as monks and nuns). For laypeople, chastity is expected, with extramarital sex and adultery being prohibited.

=== Buddhism ===
The teachings of Buddhism include the Noble Eightfold Path, comprising a division called right action. Under the Five Precepts ethical code, upāsaka and upāsikā lay followers should abstain from sexual misconduct, while bhikkhu and bhikkhuni monastics should practice strict chastity.

=== Taoism ===
The Five Precepts of the Taoist religion include "no sexual misconduct", which is interpreted as prohibiting extramarital sex for lay practitioners and marriage or sexual intercourse for monks and nuns.

== Government ==
In Iran, women are required to wear hijabs as part of that society's efforts to enforce chastity. In 2023 the Ministry of Culture and Islamic Guidance announced a new bill titled the Protection of the Culture of Chastity and Hijab Law, expanding its number of sections from 15 to 70.

== See also ==
- Law of chastity
- Purity culture – Christian sexual abstinence movement
- Ten Commandments – Biblical principles relating to ethics and worship
- Theology of the body – Christian teachings on the human body
