= Hijab in Iran =

Following the 1979 Iranian Revolution, the hijab became the mandatory dress code for all Iranian women by the order of Ayatollah Khomeini, the supreme leader of the new Islamic Republic.

Restrictions sparked several movements by activists and ordinary citizens who challenged the mandatory hijab, seeking more freedom and rights for women. Already the day after the introduction of mandatory hijab, the 1979 International Women's Day protests in Tehran erupted, delaying the introduction of the new laws. However, the government has throughout the decades cracked down on protests with violence, notably during the Mahsa Amini protests (2022–2023). In September 2024, on the second anniversary of the death of Amini, Iran's president Masoud Pezeshkian said that morality police will no longer "bother" women over the wearing of the hijab.

Historically, the hijab became widely adopted in Iran during the Safavid dynasty (1501–1736) as Shia Islam was established as the official religion, and it remained a prevalent cultural practice through the Qajar era (1789–1925). The subsequent Pahlavi era (1925–1979) was marked by significant fluctuations in state policy. Reza Shah (1925–1941) enforced the forced unveiling of women (Kashf-e hijab) as a secularization measure to modernize the country. Mohammad Reza Shah (1941–1979), in contrast, adopted a more permissive approach toward women's dress, from Western styles, fostered among the urban elite, to hijabs.

Most Iranian women wear a shawl, a headscarf, a shayla, or a chador, but in Sistan and Baluchestan province, Sunni Muslims and Baloch people commonly wear black niqabs as a sign of familial piety and modesty, while the most popular type of head covering among residents of Qeshm Island is a burqah mask.

== History ==
Muslims conquered Iran in the time of Umar (637 CE) and Iranians gradually converted to Islam and adopted Muslim customs such as hijab. Before the conquests, Iranians wore a variety of clothes and even wore veil similar to hijab. During the Middle Ages, Turkic nomadic tribes from Central Asia arrived, whose women did not wear headscarves.

=== Safavid era ===
As part of Safavid conversion of Iran to Shia Islam (from 1501 to 1736) centralization in the 16th century, the headscarf became defined as the standard headdress for many religious women in urban areas all around the Safavid Empire. Exceptions to this were seen only in the villages and among nomadic tribes, such as Qashqai. Covering the whole face was rare among the Iranians and was mostly restricted to local Arabs and local Afghans.

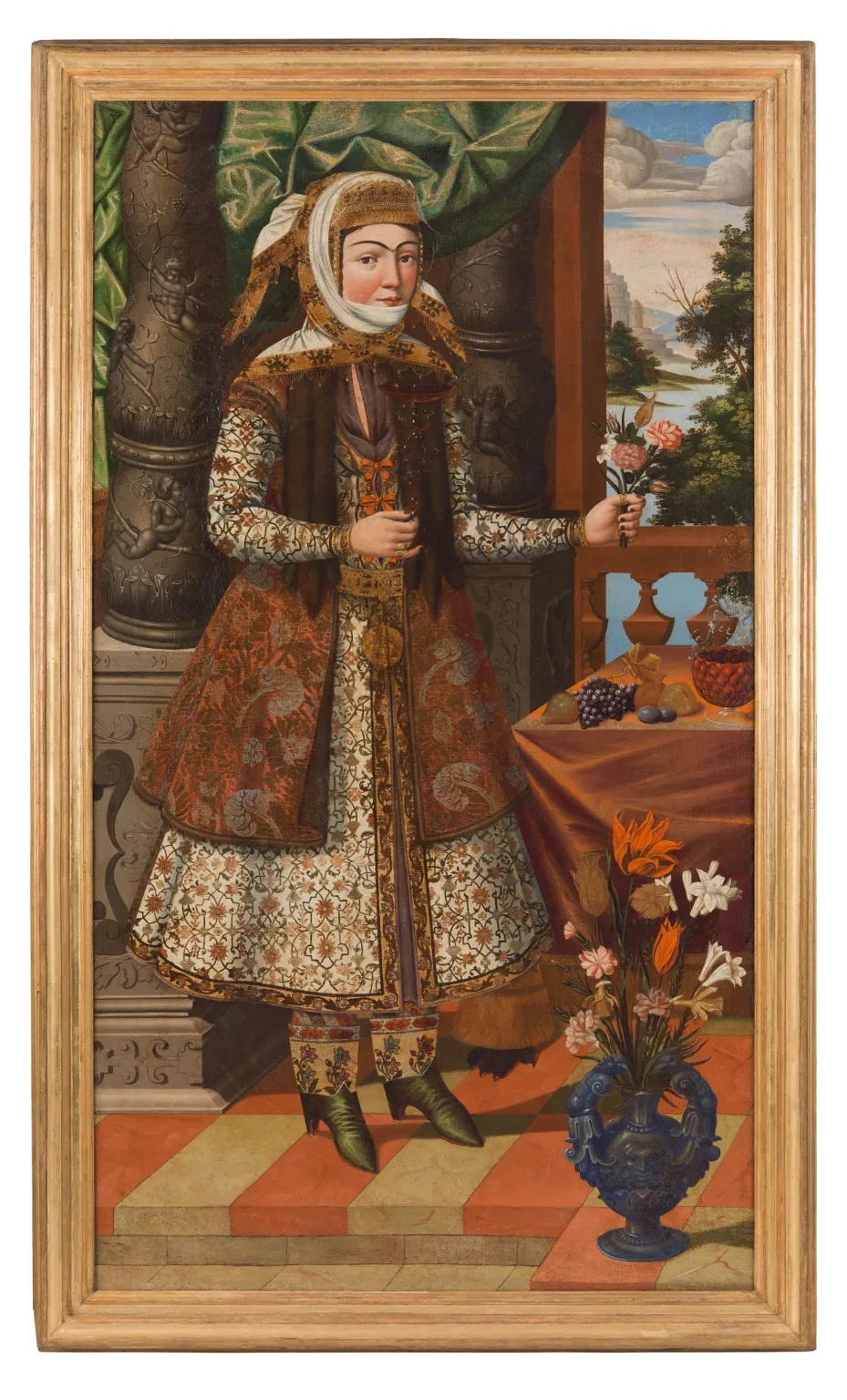
Portrait of an Armenian lady wearing a headcovering, late 17th century Isfahan

However, hijab was not uniform and monolithic in Safavid Iran. Women from different ethnic and religious groups wore different styles and colors of veils and headscarves, reflecting their regional and cultural identities. Some women also wore hats, turbans, and bonnets, influenced by European fashion.

The Safavid court was also a place of diversity and splendor in terms of clothing. The royal women wore elaborate and luxurious garments, made of silk, velvet, brocade, and fur, embroidered with gold and silver, and adorned with jewels and pearls. They also wore different types of head coverings, such as mandils (turban material), qalānsūwas (conical caps), and tāj (crowns).

=== Qajar era ===
During the Qajar era, the hijab was a prevalent fashion choice for women, as it reflected the cultural, religious, and political identity of Qajar Iran. The hijab was enforced by the Islamic dress code for women, which was introduced by the Safavid dynasty and continued by the Qajars. The hijab was often made of colorful and patterned fabrics, and sometimes adorned with pearls, feathers, or flowers, however, In the later Qajar period, women's clothing became more elaborate and diverse, reflecting the influence of European styles and fabrics. Women wore long dresses with tight waists and wide skirts, often made of silk, velvet, or brocade. They also wore jackets, vests, and shawls over their dresses, and decorated their outfits with embroidery, lace, ribbons, and jewels.

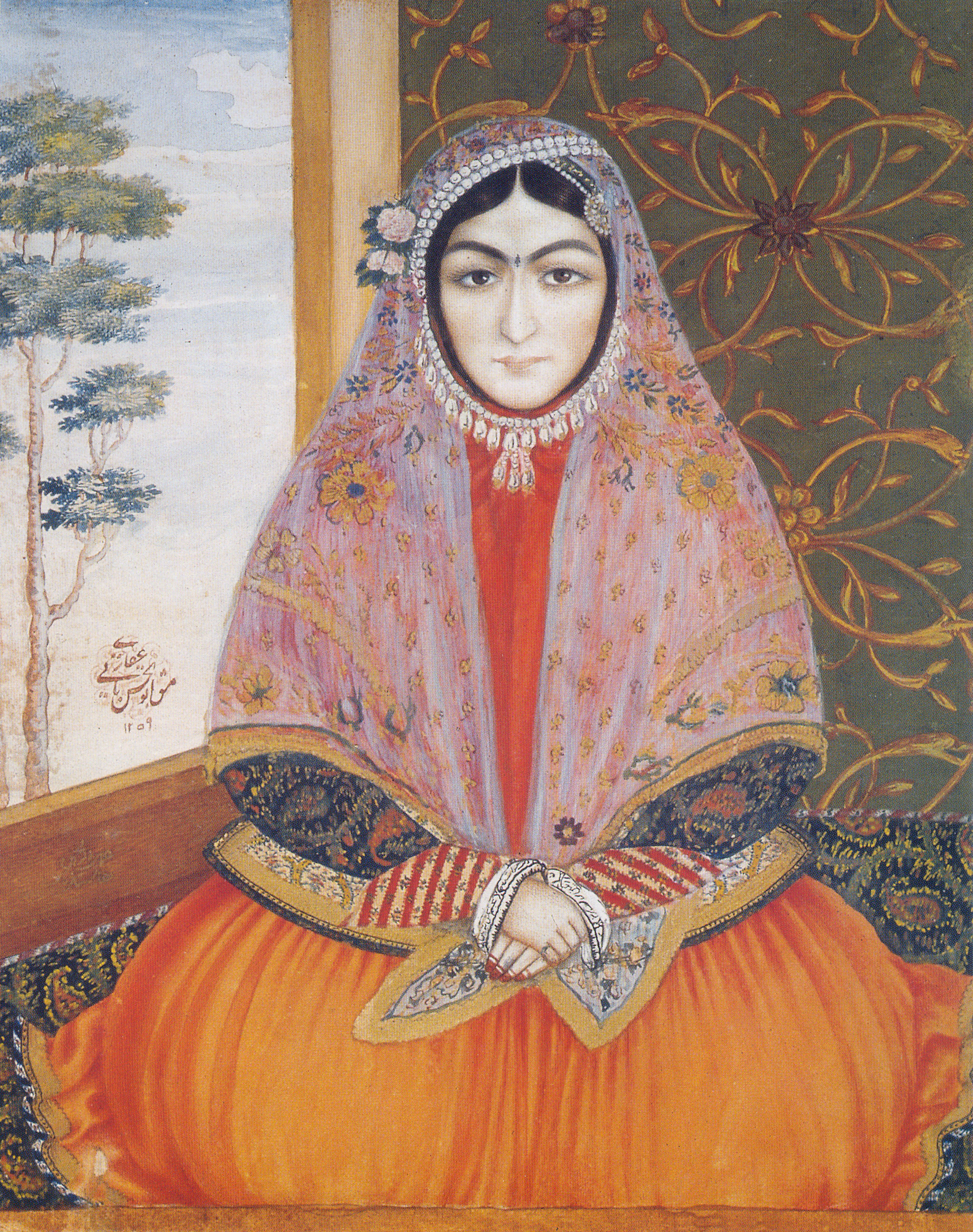
Portrait of Khorshid Khanum Ghaffari wearing a veil, 1834/35

During the era of slavery in Iran, female slaves (kaniz) were allowed to move about alone in public outside of the sex segregation of the harem unveiled, which separated them from free women.

The Qajar dynasty faced many internal and external challenges and pressures, such as the Constitutional Revolution (1905–11), the Tobacco Protest (1890–91), and the 1907 Anglo-Russian agreement. These events affected the lives and roles of women in Iran, who participated in various social and political movements, such as the women's awakening, the women's association, and the women's parliament. Some women also advocated for women's rights and education, such as Bibi Khanum Astarabadi, Tuba Azmudeh, and Sediqeh Dowlatabadi. during the economic crisis in the late 19th century under the Qajar dynasty, the poorest religious urban women could not afford headscarves, therefore Women were protected, secluded in the home or had to wear the chador.

=== Pahlavi era ===
In the 1920s, a few individual Iranian women started to appear unveiled, despite the cultural pressure to veil. In 1924, the singer Qamar-ol-Moluk Vaziri broke gender segregation and seclusion by performing unveiled in the gender-mixed company at the Grand Hotel in Tehran, and the Royal Palace Theater. Reza Shah, a military officer who supported "Westernized women active outside the home" and opposed the influence of religious clerics, came to power in December 1925. Iranian women's rights activists supported the unveiling, and the feminist Sediqeh Dowlatabadi is believed to have been the first woman in Iran to have appeared in public without the veil in 1928. To appear without a veil or even favor it in public debate was very controversial, and women's rights activists who spoke in favor of unveiling sometimes had to be protected by the police. In 1926, the Shah specifically provided police protection for individual women who appeared unveiled but with a scarf or a hat to cover the hair.

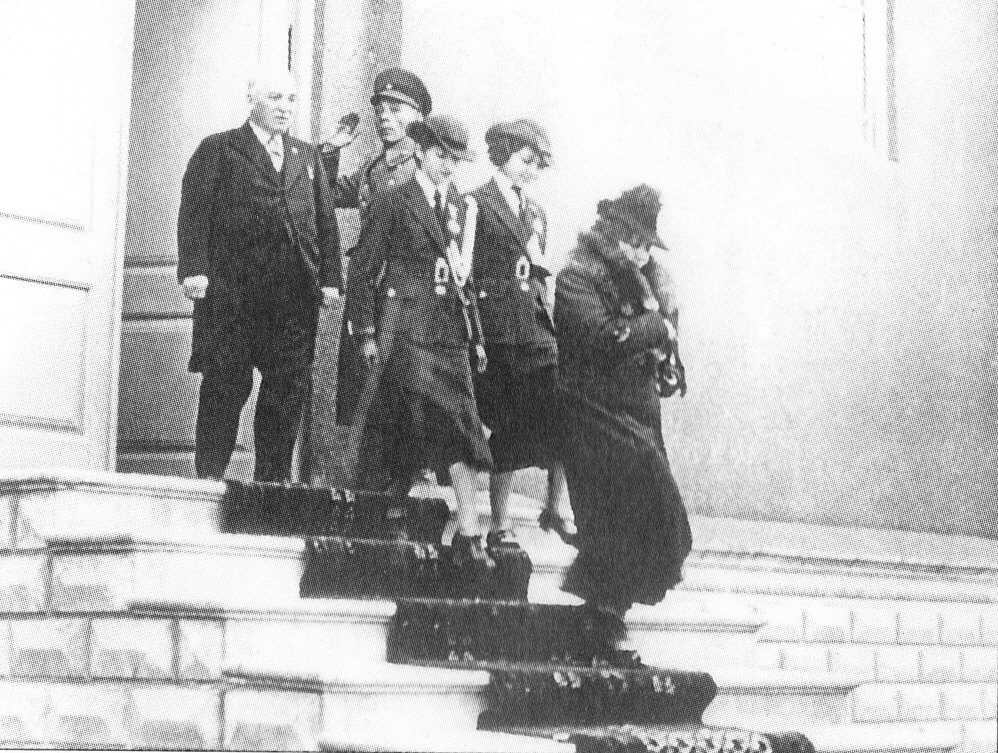
Reza Shah's wife Tadj ol-Molouk, and their daughters Shams and Ashraf, 8 January 1936

In 1928, the Queen of Afghanistan, Soraya Tarzi, appeared unveiled publicly with the Shah during her official visit to Iran. The clergy protested and asked the Shah to tell the foreign queen to cover up, but he refused. His refusal caused rumors that the Shah planned to abolish the veil in Iran. In 1928, Shah's wife, queen (Tadj ol-Molouk) attended the Fatima Masumeh Shrine during her pilgrimage in Qom wearing a veil that did not cover her completely, as well as showing her face, for which a cleric harshly criticized her. As a response, Reza Shah publicly beat the cleric who had criticised the queen the next day.

As a method of the modernization of the country, and following the example of Mustafa Kemal Atatürk in Turkey, the shah encouraged women's participation in society. The unveiling of women would have huge symbolic importance toward this and women's emancipation in general, but the shah introduced the reform gradually so as not to cause unrest.

Female teachers were encouraged to unveil in 1933, and schoolgirls and women students in 1935. The reform not only allowed female teachers and students not to veil, but allowed female students to study alongside men. All these reforms were opposed and criticized by the Shia clergy.

In 1935, the women's committee Kanun-e Banovan (Ladies Society) was formed with the support of the government. The committee's women's rights activists campaigned for unveiling.

==== Kashf-e hijab ====
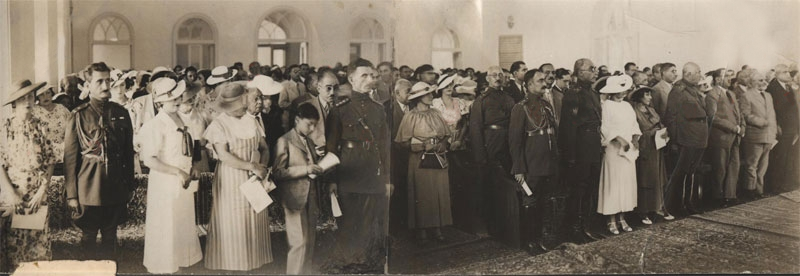
Military commanders of the Iranian armed forces, government officials, and their wives commemorating the abolition of the veil in 1936

On 8 January 1936, Reza Shah issued a decree banning all veils, known as Kashf-e hijab (Persian: کشف حجاب, lit. 'Unveiling'). The official declaration of unveiling was made on 8 January 1936, where the queen and her daughters were given an important role in this event. That day, Reza Shah attended the graduation ceremony of the Tehran Teacher's College with the queen and their two daughters unveiled and dressed in modern clothes. The queen handed out diplomas while the Shah spoke against the historic marginalization of Iranian women, telling the female graduates that the future was now in their hands. This was the first time an Iranian queen had shown herself in public. Afterwards, the Shah published pictures of his unveiled wife and daughters, and the unveiling was enforced throughout Iran. To enforce this decree, the police were ordered to physically remove the veil from any women who wore it publicly. As a result, many pious traditionalist women chose not leave their houses to avoid confrontations, and a few conservative women even committed suicide to avoid removing their hijabs due to the decree.

The ban was enforced for five years, until Reza Shah was deposed in 1941. The Iranian women's movement had generally favored unveiling, and many of Iran's leading feminists and women's rights activists organized in the Kanun-e Banuvan to campaign in favor of the Kashf-e hijab, among them Hajar Tarbiat, Khadijeh Afzal Vaziri and Sediqeh Dowlatabadi, Farrokhroo Parsa and Parvin E'tesami.

Religious conservatives reacted with outrage to the reform. According to Iran's former Supreme Leader Ali Khamenei, the policy was aimed at "eradicating the tremendous power of faith" in Muslim societies that was enabled by what he termed the "decency of women", as hijab (in his view) protected Muslim women from the "malicious abuse" suffered by women in the West, and the people from preoccupation with sexual desire.

==== Mohammad Reza Pahlavi ====
Kashf-e hijab was relaxed in 1941 under Reza Shah's heir, Mohammad Reza Pahlavi; the wearing of a headscarf or chador was no longer an offence and women were able to dress as they wished. However, hijab was still considered an indicator of backwardness or of membership of the lower class. Wearing of the chador became a significant hindrance to climbing the social ladder. Veiled women were assumed to be from conservative religious families with limited education, while unveiled women were assumed to be from the educated and professional upper or middle class. Professional middle-class women such as teachers and nurses appeared unveiled in their work place, but sometimes veiled when they returned home to their families.

Women who wore the headscarf or chador were often discriminated against, with some public institutions discouraging their use, and some restaurants refusing to admit women who wore them.

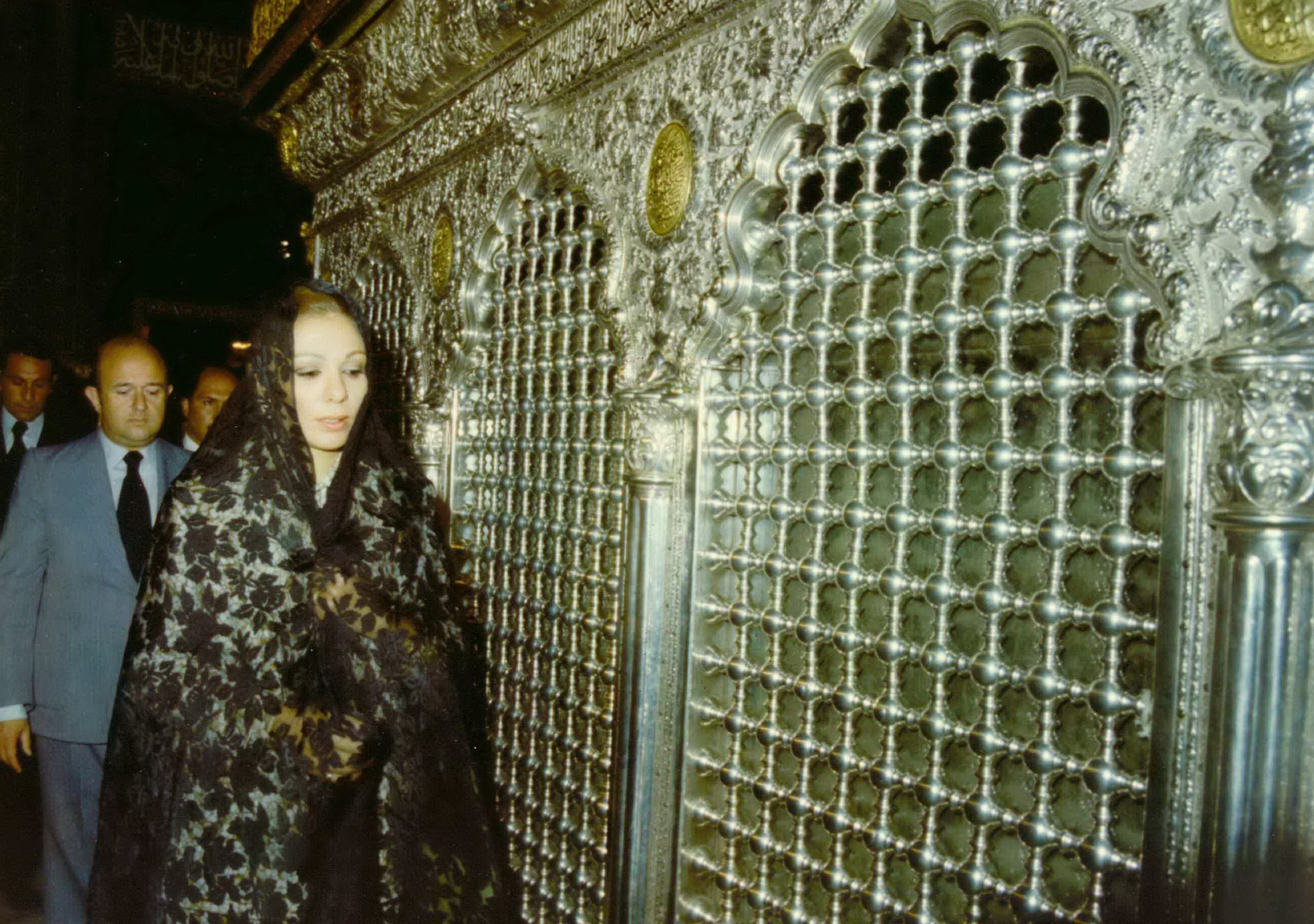
Empress Farah Pahlavi wearing a black chador at the Imam Reza Shrine in Mashhad, July 1978

In the 1970s, the chador was usually a patterned or of a lighter color such as white or beige; black chadors were typically reserved for mourning and only became more acceptable everyday wear starting in the mid-1970s. However, in the period before the Iranian Revolution, the black chador's usage outside of the city of Qom was associated with allegiance to political Islam and was stigmatized by areas of Iranian society.

During this era, traditionalists such as the Fada'iyan-e Islam (Devotees of Islam) demanded mandatory veiling and a ban on unveiled women, but their efforts failed.

=== Islamic Republic era ===
==== Opposition to the Shah and Westernization ====
Leading up to the Islamic Revolution of 1979, the wearing of hijab by educated middle-class women began to become a political symbol—an indication of opposition to the Pahlavi modernization policy and thus of Pahlavi rule. Many middle-class working women started to use it as such.

The hijab became popular among the middle class opposition, as a symbol of revolutionary advocacy for the poor, as protest of the treatment of women as sex objects, to show solidarity with the conservative women who always wore them, and as a nationalist rejection of foreign influence.

Hijab was considered by conservative traditionalists as a sign of virtue, and unveiled women as the opposite. Unveiled women came to be seen as a symbol of Western cultural colonialism; "Westoxication" (Gharbzadegi) or infatuation with western culture, education, art, consumer products etc., "a super-consumer" of products of Imperialism, a propagator of "corrupt Western culture", undermining the traditionalist conception of "morals of society", and as overly dressed up "bourgeois dolls", who had lost their honor.

In spite of hijab and gender segregation, thousands of veiled women participated in religious processions and anti-Shah demonstrations alongside men, which in the perspective of the religious sympathisers demonstrated hijab as a protection for women from sexual harassment (because conservative men regarded them as more respectable) and enabled them access to public spheres.

==== Islamic Republic ====
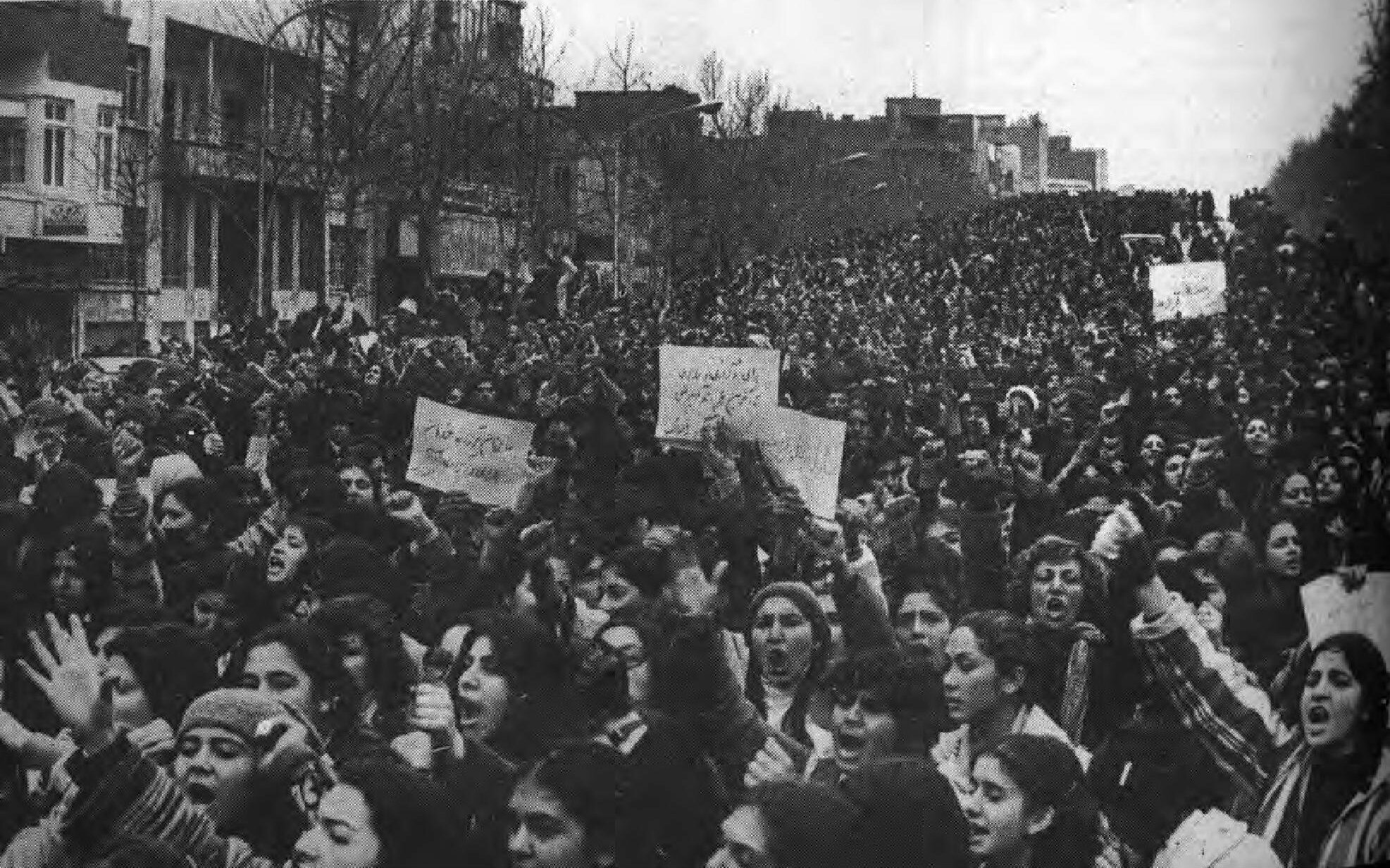
1979 Iranian Women Day's protests against mandatory veiling. Unveiled women protesting against the introduction of mandatory veiling. While many women had worn the veil during the revolution, they had not expected mandatory veiling and did not support it.

After the Islamic Revolution and founding of the Islamic Republic in 1979, mandatory hijab was enshrined as law. This was in spite of statements made during Ayatollah Khomeini's exile in France, where he denied any intent to control women's dress code. Khomeini, the newly appointed Supreme Leader of Iran after the 1979 Revolution, announced on 7 March that all women in the workplace were required to wear the hijab (Islamic headscarf), stating that going into a government office without one was the same as being nude. He was supported in this by the conservative/traditionalist fraction of the revolutionaries who were hostile to unveiled women, as expressed in two slogans used during this time: "Wear a veil, or we will punch your head" and "Death to the unveiled".

Non-conservative/traditionalist women, who had worn the veil as a symbol of opposition during the revolution, had not expected veiling to become mandatory. Almost immediately after, starting from 8 March 1979 (International Women's Day), thousands of women began protesting against mandatory hijab. The protests lasted six days, until 14 March, and resulted in the (temporary) retraction of mandatory veiling, as well as government assurances that Khomeini's statement was only a recommendation.

Khomeini denied that any non-hijab wearing women were part of the revolution, telling Italian journalist Oriana Fallaci in February 1979:

"the women who contributed to the revolution were and are women who wear modest clothes. ... these coquettish women, who wear makeup and put their necks, hair and bodies on display in the streets, did not fight the Shah. They have done nothing righteous. They do not know how to be useful, neither to society, nor politically or vocationally. And the reason is because they distract and anger people by exposing themselves."

As the consolidation of power by Khomeini and his core supporters continued, left and liberal organizations, parties, figures, were suppressed and eliminated, and mandatory veiling for all women returned. This began with the "islamification of offices" in July 1980, when unveiled women were refused entry to government offices and public buildings, and banned from appearing unveiled at their work places under the risk of being fired. On the streets, unveiled women were attacked by revolutionaries.

Following the 2022 Mahsa Amini protests, widespread defiance of mandatory hijab laws gradually transformed how Iranian women and youth dressed in public in 2026, a shift further reshaped by the country's economic crisis, the June 2025 Twelve-Day War, and the 2026 Iran war. In major cities such as Tehran, street fashion among women and younger generations expanded beyond unveiling to include crop tops, sleeveless shirts, ripped jeans, and short skirts. Many people also practiced situational compliance, going uncovered in more permissive neighborhoods while carrying a headscarf for stricter areas. Attire across the country remained varied, as many women and girls continued to wear headscarves and traditional topcoats (manteaux) voluntarily due to personal Islamic conviction, modesty norms, or individual taste.

While managing legal risks, clothing retailers and independent designers adjusted to changing consumer demand. In order to avoid government scrutiny, brick-and-mortar store owners in central Tehran started stocking modern clothing for younger customers while keeping traditional long coats (manteaux) on display in storefront windows. Similarly, online designers advertised evening wear, short skirts, and fitted trousers on Instagram. To avoid drawing attention to their local operations, they often placed photos that hid models' faces in secondary carousel slides and wrote their captions in English.

== Enforcement ==
=== Mass surveillance ===
In 2024–2025, the Iranian regime began imposing mass repression using phone IMSI catchers, cameras, drones, civilian agents, subway ticket payment card tracking, to punish people and women that are "improperly" dressed without Islamic hijab.

=== Mental clinics ===
In 2024, Iran opened mental clinics in order to "treat" women who don't wear hijab.

=== 2025-2026 ===
Visible patrols by the Guidance Patrol declined compared to pre-2022 levels, authorities relied more heavily on institutional pressure, targeted arrests, and economic penalties to avoid risking mass street confrontations." Following Chief Justice of Iran Gholam-Hossein Mohseni-Eje'i's call for action against "abnormal behavior" in public spaces, police in central Tehran arrested a number of people in November 2026 for allegedly encouraging public nudity and abandoning the hijab. The ultraconservative newspaper Kayhan described the removal of headscarves as a foreign-backed weapon during the 2026 Iran war, while conservative commentators and lawmakers insisted that mandatory dress codes remained legally binding.

== Modern law ==
=== Dress code ===
After the revolution, Parliament made it compulsory for all women to observe the veil and for the first time rules prescribing the hijab as proper attire for women were written into the law.

According to regulations, women's clothing should meet the following conditions:

- Women must cover their entire body except their faces and hands (from the wrist to the base of the fingers).
- Women who choose not to wear chador must wear a long overcoat or manteau. The manteau should be thick enough to conceal what is underneath, and should be loose-fitting.
- Women should not wear bright colored clothes or clothes that are adorned so that they may attract men's attention. In recent years, many women have begun wearing more colorful dresses in public and this seems to be tolerated by the moral police. Correspondingly, Iranians have been arrested or received warnings over bad hijabi ("improper veiling").

Although the Penal Code criminalizes non-observance of hijab under Article 638, specific requirements such as wearing a manteau, avoiding bright colors, and loose-fitting garments are enforced primarily through police regulations and are not explicitly codified in national legislation.

What follows is an excerpt from Ayatollah Ali Khamenei's speech regarding bad-hijabi:

Iran's enemies needn't more than artillery, guns and so forth, they need to spread their anti-culture that leads to moral corruption. Instead of bombs, they now send miniskirts and short manteaus. If they arouse sexual desires in any given country, if they spread unrestrained mixing of men and women, and if they lead youth to behavior to which they are naturally inclined by instincts, there will no longer be any need for artillery and guns against that nation.

=== Enforcement of compulsory hijab ===
There are several parts of the government that have the responsibility and eligibility to make laws and enforce them to people regarding the matter of compulsory hijab. First of all, the morality police or Gasht-e Ershad, which are units of the Iranian security forces that patrol the streets and public places to monitor the compliance of women with the hijab law. The judiciary, which is the branch of the government that prosecutes and punishes women who violate the hijab law, with penalties ranging from fines and lashes to imprisonment and flagellation. The Islamic Revolutionary Guard Corps (IRGC), which is a paramilitary force that cooperates with the judiciary and the morality police to suppress women who protest against the hijab law.

In 2023, the Minister of Islamic Culture and Guidance announced they have a new Bureau of Chastity Living, meant to work in parallel with the country's public culture council.

=== Law enforcement command ===
Facial recognition cameras, a product of Bosch, were deployed for use. Under the 2023 law, business places that are reported to not force women to wear the hijab receive fines of up to 10 percent of their annual gross profit. A uniform was issued for waitresses in the entire city of Mashhad.

The fines are withdrawn from the person's bank account by the government.

Municipality in Tehran in August 2023 hired 400 hijab guards (hijabban) they report and then make arrest. .

In August 2023, Iranian MPs have voted to review a controversial hijab law behind closed doors, potentially avoiding public debate. The proposed "Hijab and Chastity Bill" would impose stricter penalties on women not wearing headscarves, prompted by protests over the death of a woman in custody. The decision to use Article 85 of Iran's constitution allows for a three to five-year trial period, pending approval from the powerful Council of Guardians.

=== Penalties ===
Crime	Highest Charge/Punishment	Fine
Foreigner without hijab	Passport confiscated; Denied residence	Article 23 Islamic criminal code
Not wearing hijab out on the street / Removing own hijab in public (kashf hijab)	1st time 6th degree maximum punishment, second time fifth degree misdemeanor	First time 6–24 million toman; 2nd time 24 to 50 million toman
Public nudity (not wearing full hijab) or semi nude (improper clothes)	Arrest; Five to ten-year prison, five year imprisonment(second offense); 3rd degree (first offense), 4th degree fine	36–55 million toman; 50 to 100 million toman on repeated arrest
Not wearing hijab in car and on motor bike	500 thousand toman traffic fine, 3 to 6 month car confiscation after second notice	Up to twenty million toman
Collaborating with enemy countries, media, foreign groups against hijab	Fourth degree; Five year to ten-year jail time	50 to 100 million toman
Insulting hijab online or in real life and or advertising not wearing hijab	Fourth degree (First degree on second time); Banned from exiting the country; Banned from cyber/internet 6 month to 2 year; Contents records deleted	1st time offender 50 to 100 million toman; second time more than 280 million toman
Working advertisings without/or against hijab wearing	Third and or fourth degree	Double the payments received; 36 to 55 million toman; Two time offenders 72 million to 110 million toman
Anti-hijab wearing advertising action by businesses, workplaces and or employee	2nd degree, fine of 2/4/ month of all of profits gained*; Banned from leaving the country 6 months- to 2 years	36 to 55 million; 55 to 100 million
Celebrities without/ not wearing hijab	2nd degree or /%10 of net worth*; 6 months barred from working (5 to 15 year on repeat); 6 months to 2 year banned from using the internet (repeat)	every estate/properties confiscated; 280 million plus toman
Selling / imported forbidden dresses and clothes	Third/and or Fourth degree or 2/4 fold value of product*	50 to 100 million toman
Production / distribution of banned dresses / clothes	Third/and or Fourth degree or 2/4 fold value of product*	50 to 100 million toman
Designing of banned dresses / clothes	Third/and or Fourth degree, three times income received from work*; 6 months to 2 year banned from using the internet; Online content wiped	50 to 100 million toman
Deleting/ hiding CCTV footage tape from FARAJA	Fourth degree; Fired and barred for up to 6 month- 2 years from government services	50 to 100 million toman
Government worker/employees not wearing properly hijab	Fired and barred for up to 6 month- 2 years from government services	
Insulting / abusing hijabi wearing women	6 month; 70 lashes	
Insulting Muslims who attempted guide person to hijab	Sixth degree	6–24 million toman
Extra insulting Muslims who attempted to guide person to hijab	Fifth degree	24–50 million toman

== Movements ==
=== Protest, White Wednesday ===
In May 2017, My Stealthy Freedom, an Iranian online movement advocating for women's freedom of choice, created the White Wednesday movement, a campaign that invites men and women to wear white veils, scarves, or bracelets to show their opposition to the mandatory forced veiling code. The campaign resulted in Iranian women posting pictures and videos of themselves wearing pieces of white clothing to social media. Masih Alinejad, the Iranian-born journalist and activist based in the UK and the US, who started the protest in 2017, described it in Facebook, "This campaign is addressed to women who willingly wear the veil, but who remain opposed to the idea of imposing it on others. Many veiled women in Iran also find the compulsory imposition of the veil to be an insult. By taking videos of themselves wearing white, these women can also show their disagreement with compulsion."

=== Protest, Vida Movahed ===
On 27 December 2017, a White Wednesday protester, 31-year-old Vida Movahed, also known as "The Girl of Enghelab Street", was arrested. A video of her silently waving her white hijab headscarf on a stick while unveiled for one hour on Enqelab Street in Tehran went viral on social media. On social media, footage of her protest was shared along with the hashtag "#Where_Is_She?" On 28 January 2018, human rights lawyer Nasrin Sotoudeh announced Movahed had been released, In the following weeks, multiple people re-enacted Movahed's public display of removing their hijabs and waving them in the air.

On 1 February 2018, the Iranian police released a statement saying that they had arrested 29 people, mostly women, for removing their headscarves. One woman, Shima Babaei, was arrested after removing her headdress in front of a court.

On 23 February 2018, Iranian Police released an official statement saying that any women found protesting Iran's compulsory veiling code would be charged with "inciting corruption and prostitution," which carries a maximum sentence of 10 years in prison. considerably harsher than regular sentences of two months imprisonment or up to 74 lashes; or a fine of five hundred to fifty thousand rials for being without hijab.

Following the announcement, multiple women reported being physically abused by police following their arrests, some sentenced to multiple years in prison. In one video, an unveiled woman is tackled by a man in police uniform while standing atop a tall box, waving her white scarf at passers by. On 8 March 2018, another video went viral, this one of three hijab-less Iranian women singing a feminist fight song in honor of International Women's Day and feminist issues in Tehran's subway .

That same day, in response to the peaceful hijab protests, Supreme Leader Ali Khamenei posted a series of tweets, defending the Islamic state's dress code, praising Islam for keeping women "modest" and in their "defined roles" such as educators and mothers, and chastising Western immodesty. "The features of today's Iranian woman include modesty, chastity, eminence, protecting herself from abuse by men."

=== Protest, Mahsa Amini ===
In 2021, Ebrahim Raisi, a hard-line principlist, was elected as President of Iran, and enforcement of hijab regulations intensified. In September 2022, widespread protests erupted across Iran following the death of Mahsa Amini during custody for wearing the hijab improperly.

As of April 2023, protests had fizzled out due to a violent crackdown, in the form of mass arrests and several executions, but obedience to mandatory hijab by younger women had also dropped markedly, despite harsh penalties. In the capital city of Tehran, it could still be observed in the Bazaar (home of tradition), but not "in places popular with younger women"—parks, cafes, restaurants and malls.

Farnaz Fassihi of the New York Times quoted a 23 year old a graduate student in Sanandaj, in western Iran, "I have not worn a scarf for months ... Whether the government likes to admit it or not, the era of the forced hijab is over."

Even many religious women who wear a hijab by choice have joined the campaign to repeal the law. A petition with thousands of names and photographs of women is circulating on Instagram and Twitter with the message, “I wear the hijab, but I am against the compulsory hijab.”

However, as of 1 April 2023, there was"unyielding rhetoric" from the Iranian Interior Ministry and head of the judiciary, promising "no retreat or tolerance" on enforcement of mandatory hijab. and two weeks prior Iranian authorities proposed new measures to enforce hijab, replacing Guidance Patrols with surveillance cameras. These

will be used to monitor public spaces for women not wearing the hijab, and offenders will be punished subsequently with measures that include cutting off their mobile phone and Internet connections. Police and judicial authorities will be tasked with collecting evidence and identifying violators.

In May 2023 Chief Justice Gholam-Hossein Mohseni-Eje'i called on Iran's security and intelligence agencies to arrest women who flout Iran's mandatory hijab rules, and to hand them over to the Iranian judicial authorities for “severe punishment.”

=== Parastoo Ahmadi music video ===
A popular Iranian singer, Parastoo Ahmadi, performed and streamed a virtual concert with no audience present while not wearing the hijab, for which she was arrested in December 2024. The next day, faced with a public outcry, the authorities released the singer and members of her band.

In June 2026, Ahmadi and eight other members of the group that were involved in the Caravanserai Concert were convicted of "public decency through the production and publication of obscene and immoral content" and were sentenced by a criminal court to 74 lashes and had two-year bans imposed on both travel and artistic performances, based on the release of the video that showed Ahmadi without a hijab.

Mahmood Amiry-Moghaddam of Iran Human Rights called the sentence of lashes imposed on Ahmadi as "inhumane and humiliating" and said that her case might be a sign of a renewed "crackdown on women" by the Iranian government for violation of religious rules, such as requirements to wear a hijab, following a deal with the United States to end the 2026 Iran war.

== Public opinion ==
Surveys conducted in March 2023 and March 2024 by the University of Maryland School of Public Policy indicated a divided Iranian public on the issue of hijab enforcement, with increased polarization in the society on the matter. According to the data:

- In March 2024, 37.9% of respondents stated that women should observe the Islamic hijab in public, but that if they do not, it is better not to confront them. This view slightly decreased from 41.4% in March 2023.
- 42% in March 2024 believed that women should observe the Islamic hijab in public and that women who do not comply should be confronted, compared to 39.3% holding that view in 2023.
- Support for the view that women should have more liberty in what they wear in public, and that those who do not observe hijab should not be confronted, stood at 17.3% in 2024, an increase from 14.5% in 2023.

These results suggest that while support for mandatory hijab remains significant, an increasing portion of the population favors a more tolerant approach toward non-compliance.

More recent data by the University of Maryland School of Public Policy further reinforces this trend. By October 2025, the share of respondents who believed women should observe the hijab but should not be confronted if they do not rose to 44%, making it the dominant position. At the same time, support for strict enforcement declined to around 30%, while approximately one-fifth of respondents (21%) favored greater personal freedom in dress without confrontation. These figures indicate a continued shift toward more moderate and non-confrontational attitudes, even as a significant portion of the population still supports the principle of hijab in public.

== See also ==
- Fashion in Iran
- Woman, Life, Freedom movement
- Homa Darabi
- Girls of Enghelab Street
