= September document =

Negotiation on the nuclear program of Iran

The September document (Persian: سند سپتامبر) is used by Iranian Minister of Foreign Affairs in 2023 to refer to result of ongoing indirect and directly talks with United States Biden administration in 2022 after 2015 Joint Comprehensive Plan of Action (JCPOA) for a potential agreement replacing it. It may also refer to the final draft of an agreement prepared as part of the negotiation that attempted to revive the 2015 nuclear deal.

The negotiations were based on 2014 Iran nuclear deal framework but the details were unreleased The JCPOA, which imposed limits to the Iranian nuclear program in exchange for the removal of sanctions on the country, was signed by Iran with the world powers in July 2015. In 2018, however, the administration of then President Donald Trump withdrew from the deal reimposed its unilateral sanctions. Iran responded by scaling back its compliance with the agreement.

During the Biden administration, negotiations resumed but the US withdrew from the deal, releasing a statement in 2022 that the 2015 JCPOA was no longer a priority. Iranian Foreign Minister Hossein Amir-Abdollahian stated that the agreement had stalled due to the American belief that the 2022 anti-government protests could escalate into a revolution. By 2023, released statements indicated a series of informal agreements between the two countries, which entailed Iran's release of hostages and the reduction of enriched uranium stockpile to 3,795.5 kilograms in August, a decline of 949 kilograms since July.
