= Nazer app =

Mass surveillance app products of Iran

Nazer 1 and Nazer 2 are mass surveillance app products of the Islamic republic regime of Iran. The app is in use with Iranian Armed Forces the Police Force. Users may report location and car license plates of other people and women who are not properly hijabi dressed, the government would then fine or issue other punishments such as flogging and car license confiscation.

The app may have users report Iranian women who ride motorbikes, women without hijab in hospital ambulances, the app is also in use with Iranian government employees.

== See also ==
- Compulsory hijab in Iran
