= Azam Jangravi =

Iranian human rights advocate

Azam Jangravi, (Persian: اعظم جنگروی; born June 9, 1983, in Tehran) is an Iranian Cybersecurity professional and human rights advocate who lives in Toronto, Canada. She is primarily famous for being one of The Girls of Enghelab during the Iranian protests against compulsory hijab. In Enqelab Street she protested the compulsory hijab by removing her scarf on top of an electricity transformer box and waving it above her head.

== Early life and career in Iran ==
Azam was born in Tehran, the fifth child of Mostafa Jangravi and Mehry. She was raised in a traditional religious family and had to marry by the age of 22 as her mother pressured her.

She married Saeed, a conservative religious person whose family obliged Azam to wear Hijab everywhere.

Azam obtained a Computer Science Bachelor's Degree from the University of Tehran. Later, she continued her studies for a Masters in AI and Robotics.

Azam became pregnant with her daughter Viana in 2009. The couple never got along and as their quarrels got worse with time, she decided not to raise her daughter in that environment. Azam filed a divorce but as the laws and regulations of the Islamic Republic are against women's rights, it took her 4 years to finalize it.

== Activism ==
On December 27, 2017, during antigovernmental protests in Iran, Vida Movahed climbed on an electricity transformer box on Tehran's Enghelab St. She removed her headscarf, tied it to a stick and waved it while standing calmly, surrounded by the crowd that gathered to protest to the compulsory hijab. She was immediately arrested by the police, but she got the name "the first Girl of Enghelab Street".

Many women later reenacted Movahed's action in multiple spots in Tehran, and Jangravi was one of them. She went atop an electricity transformer box and waved her scarf as Movahed did. After the police arrested Jangravi, they put her in solitary confinement and left her there for ten days. She was released later temporarily on bail. In an interview she mentioned that she was sentenced to three years in jail for "promoting indecency and wilfully breaking Islamic law".

She was told that she should sign a confession expressing her regret and that she was mentally ill. They also threatened that custody of her child would be taken away in favour of her ex-husband or her child might be transferred to social services. Following that, she fled the country to Turkey and later moved to Canada.
