= Shaparak Shajarizadeh =

Iranian human rights advocate and political prisoner

- Born: 1975 (age 50–51); Iran
- Occupations: Social activist, human rights advocate
- Known for: Girls of Revolution Street
- Children: 1

Shaparak Shajarizadeh (Persian: شاپرک شجری زاده) (born 1975) is an Iranian women's rights activist and a former political prisoner. She is also a member of women's committee of Iran Transition Council. Shajarizadeh is well known for her efforts in empowering Women's rights in Iran and activism against Iran's contemporary compulsory hijab law. She possess anti-headscarf sentiments and also pioneered online campaigns such as "Girls of Revolution Street" and "White Wednesdays" as a part of the protests against compulsory hijab in an effort to encourage both men and women in Iran to post images in the social media platforms of themselves without wearing headscarves. She was arrested and imprisoned twice for defying Iran's laws about compulsory hijab laws.

== Biography ==
Shajarizadeh was born and raised up in Iran. She spent most of her life in Iran until 2018. In July 2018, after facing sanctions and pressure, she fled to Turkey where she reunited with her son while her husband was in Iran during the time. She then migrated to Canada in 2018 where she is currently in exile and settled in Toronto with her husband and son. In July 2018, in her Instagram account she revealed that she left Iran due to ongoing violence against activists.

== Activism ==
On 21 February 2018, she was arrested for protesting by removing a headscarf and waving it in a Gheytarieh street and eyewitnesses said that the police brutally attacked, beat and abused her from behind and took her in custody. The video clip which featured Shajarizadeh without the headscarf went viral in the social media and triggered online civil disobedience movements such as Girls of Revolution Street and White Wednesdays. She encouraged men and women to "post images on social media of themselves either wearing white or no headscarf to protest being forced to wear the hijab. She was charged with encouraging possible prostitution, initiating national propaganda against the Government of Iran and national security. She was later released on bail in April 2018 after facing two months jail term.

Again, on 1 May 2018, for repeatedly removing her headscarf in public, she was arrested along with her son and released within hours. She then fled Iran.

In July 2018, she was sentenced in absentia to a total of 20 years in prison; 2 years in Qarchak Prison in addition to an 18-year suspended prison term.

She also credited internationally acclaimed lawyer Nasrin Sotoudeh, who also came in support of anti-compulsory hijab sentiments. In February 2020, she also called upon Iranian people to boycott the parliamentary election and insisted that Iranians have lost faith on the politicians.

She lives in exile in Canada and serves as a senior fellow at the Raoul Wallenberg Centre for Human Rights along with Canadian women's rights advocate Irwin Cotler.

Along with Canadian journalist Rima Elkouri, she has written an autobiography La Liberté n'est pas un crime (Freedom is not a crime).

== Honours ==
In February 2020, she was conferred with the Geneva Summit International Women's Rights Award for 2020 by an international coalition of 25 human rights organisations for her efforts to maintain women's rights in Iran.

She was included in the BBC's list of 100 inspiring and influential women from around the world for 2018.
