= Men In Hijab =

Men in Hijab was a movement in Iran and other parts of the Islamic world in 2016 in which men wore the hijab, or female headscarf, as a show of solidarity with their female relatives and wives. It aimed to end the requirement of women to wear the hijab.

== See also ==
- Hijab
- Hijab in Iran
- Human rights in Iran
