= Hijab and chastity bill =

Former bill in Iran

- Hijab and chastity Bill - front page
- Effective: November 2024, MP Bankipour, Ghalibaf

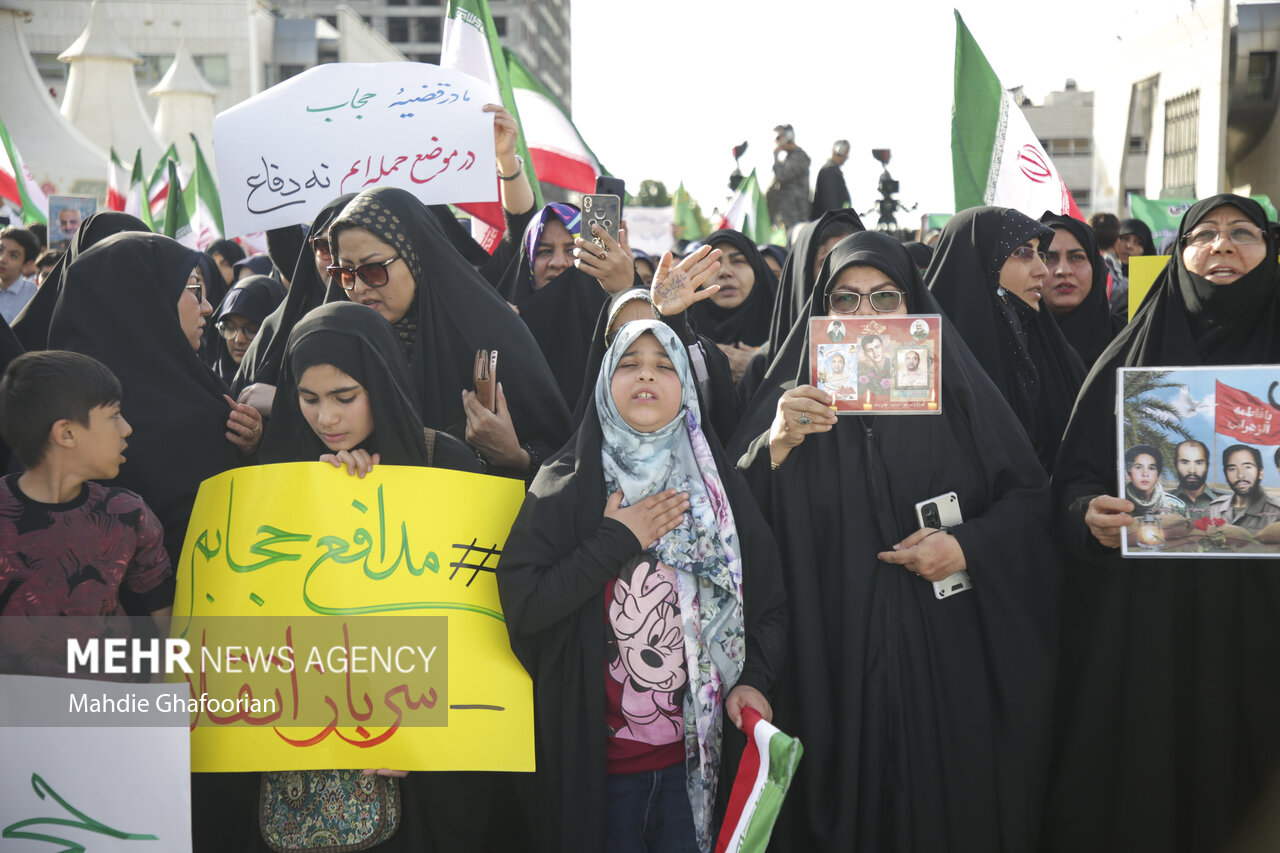
Hijab is tax exempt under the new law

Hijab and chastity bill (Persian: لایحه عفاف و حجاب) officially the Bill to Support the Family by Promoting the Culture of Chastity and Hijab (لایحه حمایت از خانواده از طریق ترویج فرهنگ عفاف و حجاب) was a planned bill for Hijab in Iran.

This bill was drafted by the Iranian judiciary after the closure of the Guidance Patrol and in the midst of the Women, Life, Freedom movement. The government of Seyyed Ebrahim Raisi sent it to the Islamic Consultative Assembly. It was eventually passed by the Majlis but the bill was suspended by the Supreme National Security Council making it not official law.

== Timeline ==
The bill was drafted in May 2023 and sent to President Ebrahim Raisi's. The cabinet modified and reviewed the bill, adding 6 more articles. It was then sent to the Parliament on 1 June. The bill was significantly altered and expanded by the parliament's Judiciary committee, increasing it from 15 to 74 articles.

The bills final revision was published by the parliament on 8 June.

In October 2024, it was reported that women in central city of Isfahan who were not wearing hijabs received threatening text messages from authorities, saying they would be prosecuted if they went out without a hijab again.

== Description ==
The bill has five articles and 74 chapters. The law authorizes the Iranian government to fine and imprison individuals and businesses that fail to comply with hijab mandates. It imposes heightened penalties on women who violate these rules, including fines and imprisonment of up to 10/15 years or a monetary penalty of up to 165 and 168 million toman.

The bill has been widely criticized for its restrictive impact on women's rights, curtailing freedoms of expression, assembly, and participation in public life while perpetuating systemic sex discrimination. International human rights organizations and various governments have condemned the legislation, arguing that it contravenes international human rights standards.

30 government agencies are tasked to the law.

Under this law the people may report others for violations.

== Criticism ==
Etemad claimed the law will have security problems for Iran.

== See also ==
- Morality police
