= Manto =

Manto may refer to:

== People ==
- Mando (singer), Greek singer
- Manto Mavrogenous, Greek national heroine
- Manto Munshi (musician), Indian musician
- Saadat Hasan Manto, Urdu short story writer known by his pen name Manto
- Manto Tshabalala-Msimang (1940–2009), South African politician
- Manto (daughter of Tiresias)

== Film and television ==
- Manto (2015 film), a Pakistani film about Saadat Hasan Manto
- Manto (2018 film), an Indian biographical film about Saadat Hasan Manto
- Manto (TV series), Pakistani TV series about Saadat Hasan Manto

== Other ==
- Manto (mythology), various mythological figures
- Manto (butterfly), a butterfly genus in the family Lycaenidae
- Mantophasmatodea, an order of carnivorous insect discovered in 2002
- "Manto" (poem), a didactic poem by the Italian poet Poliziano
- Manto ore deposit, a horizontally oriented orebody or pipe
- Manto, Honduras, a municipality in the Honduran department of Olancho
- Manto (grape), Spanish wine grape also known as Manto negro

== See also ==
- Manteau (disambiguation)
