= My Stealthy Freedom =

Online movement protesting compulsory hijab in Iran

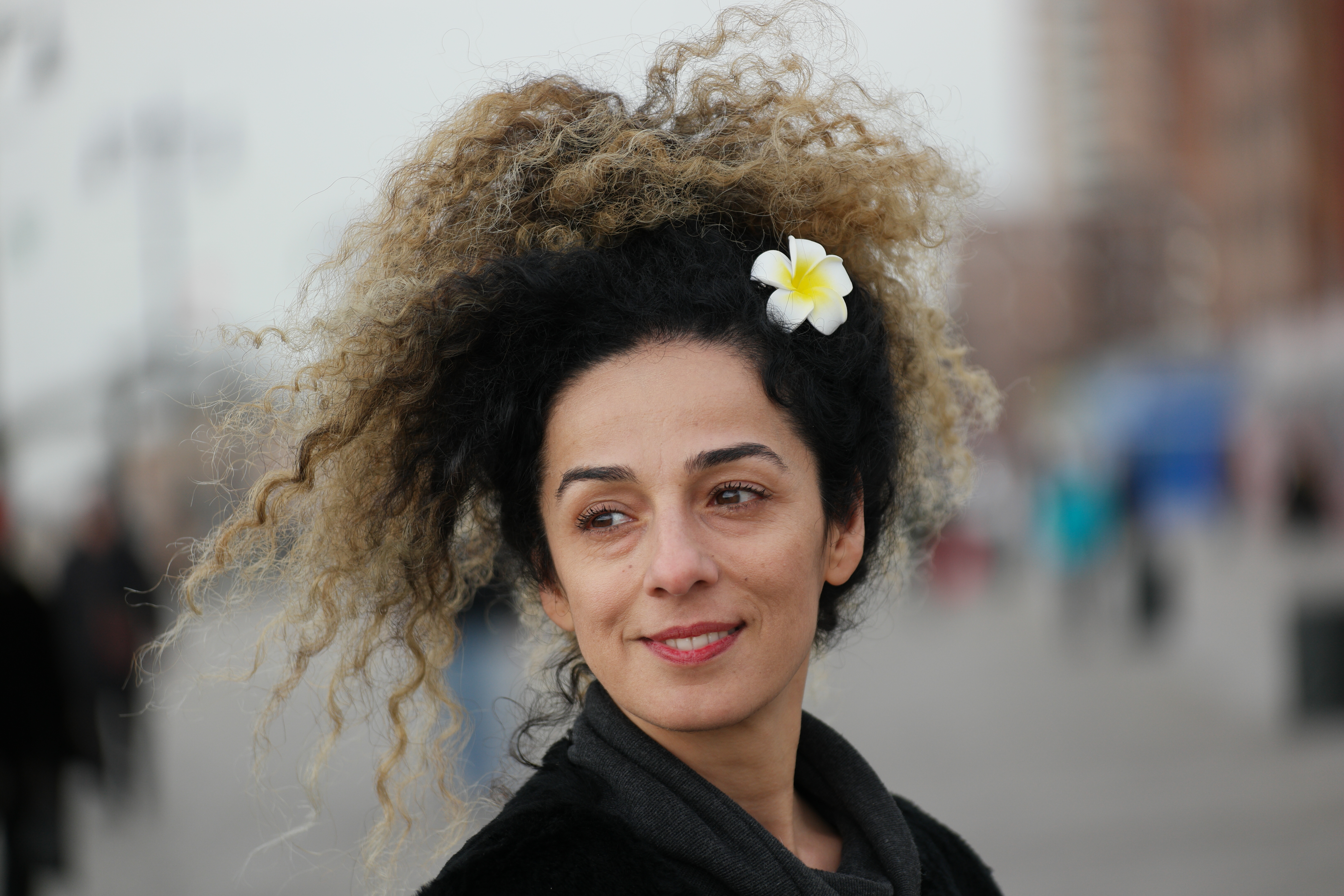
Masih Alinejad in 2018

My Stealthy Freedom is an online movement that was started in 2014 by Masih Alinejad, an Iranian-born journalist and activist based in the United Kingdom and the United States. This movement started as a Facebook page, called My Stealthy Freedom, where women in Iran post photos of themselves without scarves, as a protest against the compulsory hijab laws in the country. By the end of 2016, the page had surpassed 1 million Facebook likes. The initiative has received wide international and national coverage, and has been both praised and criticized.

== Chronology ==
The Facebook page called Stealthy Freedom was set up on 5 May 2014 and it is dedicated to posting images of women with their hijab (scarf) removed. Many women have submitted their pictures without hijab, taken in various locations: parks, beaches, markets, streets, and elsewhere. Alinejad said that the campaign began rather simply:

Once I posted pictures of [myself] in London, free, without a scarf. I received messages from Iranian women saying: "Don't publish these pictures because we envy you." Soon after I published another picture of myself driving in my hometown in Iran, again without a scarf. And I said to Iranian women: "I bet you can do the same." Many of them started to send me their photos without hijab, so I created a page called "My Stealthy Freedom." . . . If I were in Iran this website wouldn't exist. From far away those voiceless women can express themselves for the first time [in] more than 30 years.

In a few days, the page had received over 100,000 likes. In early 2015, it jumped up to 760,000 followers, and by the end of 2016, it reached over 968,000 likes.

In an interview with BBC in 2014, Alinejad insisted that women who have sent their photos are "not women activists, but just ordinary women talking from their hearts". Many of the pictures were accompanied by captions, some in a poetic language, and others were mischievous or defiant. Many captions have placed the emphasis on a right to choose or freedom of choice. In January 2015, Alinejad also launched #myforbiddensong as part of the My Stealthy Freedom campaign, and two months later she revived the Green movement slogan "You are all media".

My Stealthy Freedom has been described as an extremely active and lively space, publishing each month around 35–50 new pieces of content which are shared by hundreds of people. In mid-2014, #MyStealthyFreedom became an internationally used hashtag on Facebook and Twitter, averaging one million shares per week. By the end of 2016, the page had shared over 2,000 photos of Iranian women without the hijab. The page has gained many international supporters, posts are published mostly in Persian with English and French translations.

In May 2017, Alinejad launched the White Wednesdays campaign, encouraging women to remove their headscarves on Wednesdays or wear white shawls as a sign of protest.

== Reactions ==
=== Related and rival initiatives ===
Following Alinejad's initiative, gay people also opened a Facebook page, My Stealthy Homosexual Freedom, posting images with the inverted aesthetics of covered faces with rainbow flags or headless images. Iman Ganji, a doctoral student from Free University of Berlin, sees both pages as a result of general political transformation in mid-2010s, when a new middle-right government replaced the far-right one, and states that the struggle for the liberation of desire has long allied women's and queer movements together in Iran. In mid-2016, some Iranian men started Men In Hijab campaign, expressing their thoughts as well as briefly wearing the hijab themselves. This Facebook page has received over 100,000 likes and is largest among rival initiatives, but it has been criticized by foreign commentators as "laddish" for containing juvenile jokes, cartoons and videos. Among other smaller rivals is the Real Freedom of Iranian Women page, launched exactly a week after the My Stealthy Freedom, with a message celebrating the veil: "Beautiful Hijab, My Right, My Choice, My Life". Former page has received less than 10,000 likes and has also been criticized for insisting that Stealthy Freedom is part of a soft war against Iran, and also for trying to generate fear.

=== Praise ===
Alison N. Novak from Temple University and Emad Khazraee from the University of Pennsylvania stressed importance of breaking boundaries of the state's internet censorship efforts: "The goal of My Stealthy Freedom is to mobilize public opinion regarding the issue of women's rights, hijab, and the female body." Gholam Khiabany, a reader in media and communications department at Goldsmiths, University of London, has praised Alinejad's campaign, as has Victoria Tahmasebi-Birgani, an assistant professor of women and gender studies at the University of Toronto. According to Gi Yeon Koo, a cultural anthropologist from Seoul National University, "This online movement finds its value in that it has become a new platform for women to raise their voices in the public sphere." As Iman Ganji, Koo also aligns the movement with social changes started since Hassan Rouhani assumed the presidency. In 2015 the Geneva Summit for Human Rights and Democracy gave Alinejad its women's rights award for "stirring the conscience of humanity to support the struggle of Iranian women for basic human rights."

=== Criticism ===
Mahmoud Arghavan noted that Islamic feminists have criticized My Stealthy Freedom as supporting Islamophobia, though Alinejad has rejected this criticism.

=== Misinformation ===
In early June 2014, Masih Alinejad was the target of a misinformation campaign by Iranian state television, which falsely claimed that Alinejad was a target of sexual violence. Alinejad said that the story is false.

== See also ==
- Blogging in Iran
- Communications in Iran § Internet
- Death of Mahsa Amini
- International Women's Day Protests in Tehran, 1979
- Iranian clothing
- Iranian protests against compulsory hijab
- Kashf-e hijab
- Mahsa Amini protests
- Persian clothing
- Topfreedom
- Yasmine Mohammed
