= Parastoo Ahmadi =

Iranian artist and singer (born 1997)

Parastoo Ahmadi پرستو احمدی
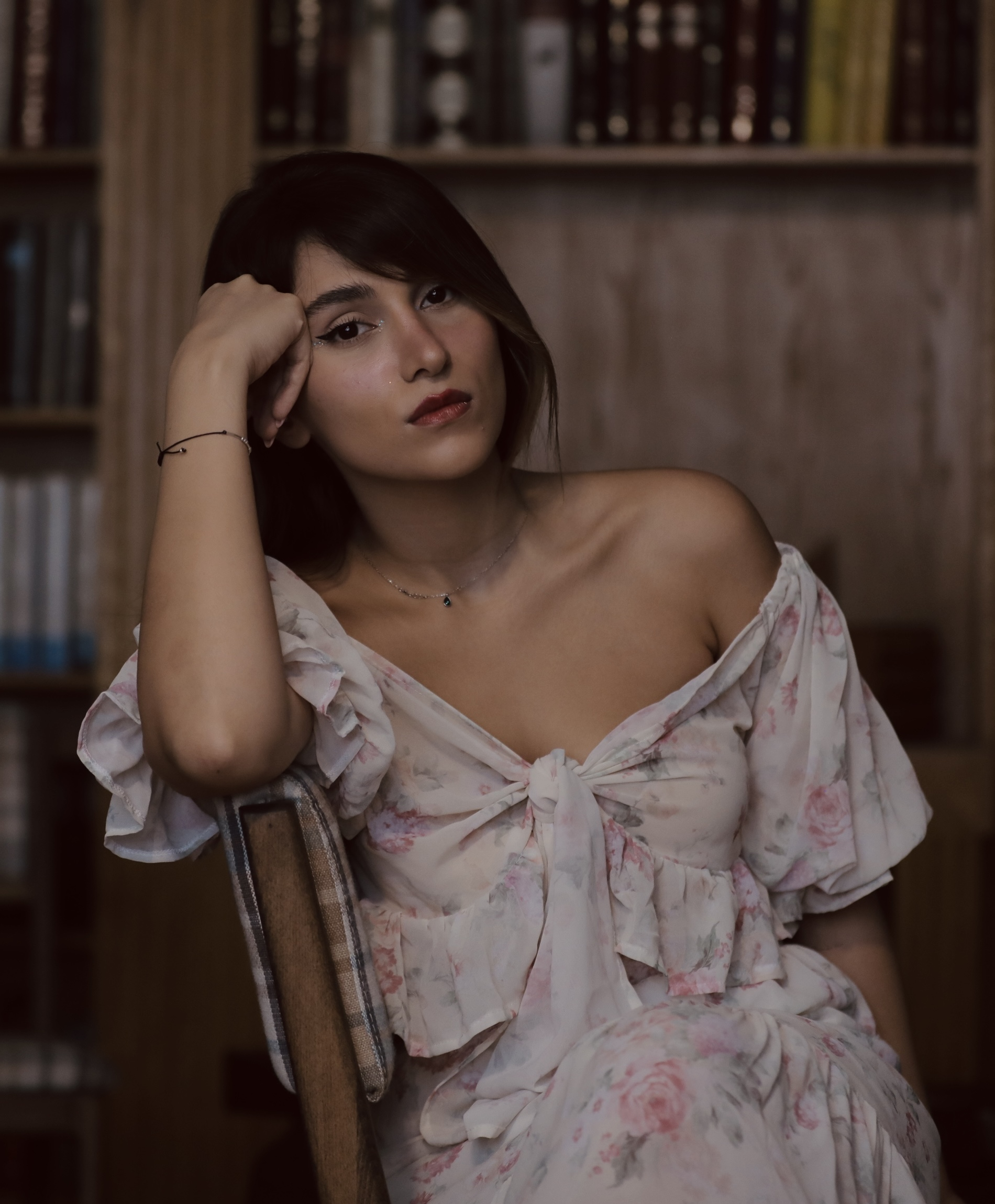
- Ahmadi in 2024

Background information
- Born: 21 March 1997 (age 29); Nowshahr, Iran
- Genres: Folk music; Iranian traditional music
- Instruments: Vocals; piano

Parastoo Ahmadi (Persian: پرستو احمدی; born 21 March 1997) is an Iranian artist and singer. Her performance of "Caravanserai Concert", performed at Dayr-e Gachin in December 2024 and broadcast live on her YouTube channel, garnered widespread international attention as she appeared without compulsory hijab. In June 2026, Ahmadi was sentenced by an Iranian criminal court to 74 lashes and a two-year ban on artistic activities and international travel for her performance, which authorities characterized as "obscene" and "immoral".

== Biography and works ==
Ahmadi graduated in film directing from Soureh International University. She began taking courses in solfège and voice training (in folk music and classical music) at the age of 14.

=== From the Blood of the Youth of the Homeland ===
In 2022 during the Mahsa Amini protests, Ahmadi performed the song From the Blood of the Youth of the Homeland.

=== The Air of Freedom ===
In June 2023, "The Air of Freedom," a song featuring lyrics by Fatemeh Dogoharani, was released. According to Ahmadi, the song was a tribute to the "Woman, Life, Freedom" movement. Following this, in October 2023, a judicial case was filed against her. Her summons to Tehran's Security Court and the confiscation of her personal belongings created challenges for her artistic pursuits.

=== Caravanserai Concert ===
During the autumn of 2024, Ahmadi performed the "Caravanserai Concert" at a caravanserai while not wearing a hijab, compulsory in the Islamic Republic of Iran. Other than her fellow performers and her crew, no audience was in attendance at the 2024 concert. She performed solo before mixed-gender audiences which is also prohibited in Iran. The live performance sparked widespread attention on social media. About her concert, she wrote:

"I, Parastoo, the girl who wants to sing for the people I love. This is a right I couldn't overlook—singing for the land I deeply adore. Here, at this point in our beloved Iran, where history and legends intertwine, hear my voice in this imaginary concert and imagine this beautiful homeland…"

In the Caravanserai Concert, Ahmadi performed pieces like "Sar Kooye Doost," "Aziz Joon," "Kamar Bareek," "Mara Bebos," "Lahze Didar," "Cheh Sazam," and "Az Khoon-e Javanan-e Vatan." She was accompanied by musicians Ehsan Beyraghdar on piano, Soheyl Faghih-Nasiri on guitar, Amin Taheri on drums, and Amir Ali Pirnia on bass.

=== Detention ===
The Iranian Judiciary announced that legal actions would be taken against Ahmadi for performing music without a permit and not adhering to "legal and religious norms." According to Mizan News Agency, legal cases have been filed against those involved, and actions will be taken against other individuals connected to the event as well. On 14 December 2024, Ahmadi was arrested in the Mazandaran province. Two of her musicians, Ehsan Birghidar and Sohail Faqih Nasiri, were also reported to be detained. On 15 December 2024, Ahmadi's lawyer stated that she had been released after widespread outrage over her arrest.

Amir Hossein Bankipour, an Iranian MP and advocate for strict hijab and 'chastity' laws, publicly supported Ahmadi's arrest.

=== Conviction and sentencing ===
In June 2026, Ahmadi and eight other members of the group involved in the Caravanserai Concert were convicted of offending "public decency through the production and publication of obscene and immoral content" and were sentenced by a criminal court to 74 lashes, along with two-year bans on both travel and artistic performances.

Mahmood Amiry-Moghaddam of Iran Human Rights called the sentence of lashes "an inhumane and humiliating punishment" and said that Ahmadi's case might be a sign that the Iranian government "may intensify its crackdown on women" for violation of religious rules, such as requirements to wear a hijab, following a deal with the United States to end the 2026 Iran war.

In September 2026, an Iranian court upheld the flogging sentence against Ahmadi, declaring it final and enforceable.

== See also ==
- List of Iranian women prisoners and detainees
