= Woman, Life, Freedom movement =

Women's rights and social justice movement in Iran

Women, Life, Freedom movement
- Part of Mahsa Amini protests Iranian protests against compulsory hijab
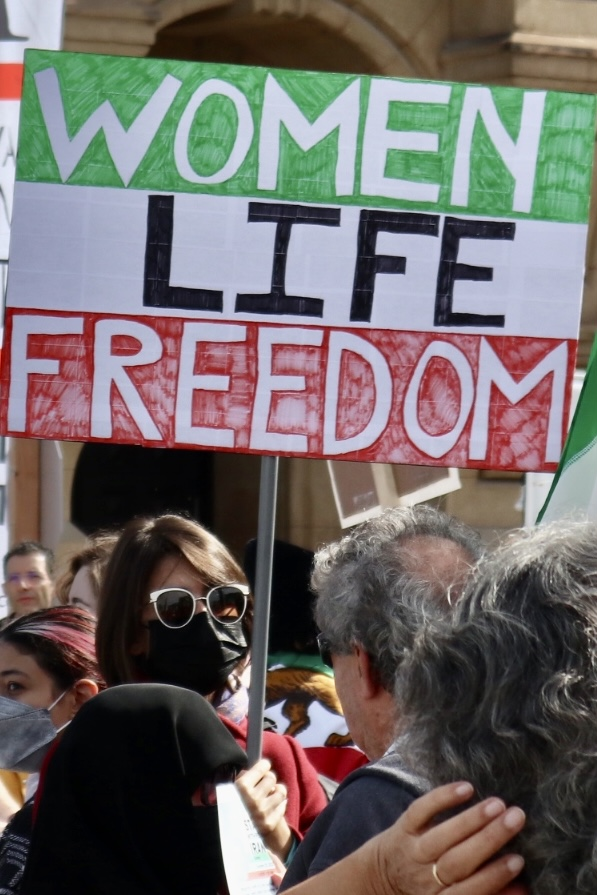
- A sign with the slogan written in English
- Date: September 2022 – present
- Location: Iran
- Caused by: Mahsa Amini protests
- Goals: Overthrowing the Islamic republic in Iran; Opposition to compulsory hijab
- Methods: Removing Islamic hijab Burning scarf Gisuboran
- Status: Ongoing
- Result: Winning the Sakharov Prize; Winning the freedom house prize

The Women, Life, Freedom movement is a protest movement launched in Iran in September 2022 after the death of Mahsa Amini, a young Kurdish woman who was arrested by the morality police for not wearing her hijab properly. The movement demands the end of compulsory hijab laws and other forms of discrimination and oppression against women in Iran, which also aligns with greater freedom for political views and religious practice. The incident sparked outrage in Iran, where anger toward the government had already been flaring, and ignited a sustained and widespread protest movement.

Women and men were taking to the streets all across Iran, outraged over the slew of social ills symbolized in Amini's death—the subjugation of women, the repression of minorities, religious chauvinism, police brutality, and government corruption. People began their own local groups, prominently "Neighbourhood Youth Alliance of Iran" and the "Covenant" and called others to action. As they came together, the slogan began to echo from one city to another, in Kurdish, Persian, Azeri, and Balochi: “Woman, Life, Freedom.”

The movement has been met with brutal repression by the Iranian authorities, who have killed hundreds of protesters and arrested thousands more. For months the protests offered hope for meaningful change. Women appeared frequently in public without wearing the mandatory headscarves, the Gasht-e Ershad had seemingly vanished, and rumours swirled that the government might scrap the head covering requirement altogether. The movement has also gained international support and recognition, and has been awarded the 2023 Freedom Award by Freedom House.

== Name origin ==
The slogan “women, life, freedom” originates from the Kurdish women's movement, which has been fighting for women's rights and autonomy in the Middle East for decades. The slogan expresses the idea that women's rights are essential for life and liberty, and that women should have the freedom to choose their own way of dressing, living, and participating in society. The movement evolved under Abdullah Öcalan's Democratic confederalism into the theoretical paradigm of jineology. In Kurdish the slogan is known as "Jin, Jiyan, Azadî" and in Persian as "Zan, Zendegī, Āzādī."

== History ==
'Women life freedom' is a campaign seeking to expand the set of moral, political, and legal tools available to mobilize international action against and ultimately end the regime that are oppressing women because of their gender. In September 2022, protesters in Iran and abroad adopted the slogan after Zhina Mahsa Amini died while in custody for "improper" attire. The death of Amini, a 22-year-old Sunni woman from Iran's Kurdish community, was a reflection of the escalating and unrelenting authoritarianism of the Iranian regime at a time of deepening economic instability. The song "The Air of Freedom," featuring lyrics by Fatemeh Dogoharani, performed by Parastoo Ahmadi and released in June 2023, is a tribute to the "Woman, Life, Freedom" movement.

In June 2023, E. Michael Jones, author and editor of Culture Wars magazine, wrote about the “hijab crisis” in Iran, stating that the US Central Intelligence Agency (CIA) had waged a “secret culture war” in Iran, using Iranian women as its “proxy forces.”

== Results ==
The movement has created an irreversible social resistance among the young generation of Iran, which believes women's rights to be the primary milestone for changing their future and a symbol to resist the corrupt influence of the government administration in creating poverty, insecurity, and unemployment. On May 28, 2024, the city of Los Angeles proclaimed September 16 of every year to be named Mahsa Day and also they have voted to have an intersection in Westwood to be called Women, Life, Freedom Square. The solidarity outside of Iran did not stop there, in Canada, Iranian-Canadian communities held large scale protests in major cities such as Vancouver. An example of this occurred on September 16, 2023, where hundreds of protesters gathered at the Vancouver Art Gallery in a rally which marked the anniversary of Mahsa Amini's death. Together they chanted 'Women, Life, Freedom' all across the streets of downtown Vancouver. People all over the world have been rallying in order to gain recognition for what the Iranian government has been doing and the actions that have caused this tragedy. There was a rally in Germany where over 100,000 people showed up as well as in Washington and in Los Angeles.

== Status ==
The Women, Life, Freedom movement in Iran is still active, despite the harsh repression by the Iranian authorities.. Large, nationwide street protests like those in late 2022 - early 2023 have largely been suppressed by severe state violence, mass arrests, and executions. Despite that, rights groups and researchers describe a quiet revolution in which many women continue to defy compulsory hijab rules, challenge gender segregation, and push back against state control in daily life.

After the Islamic Republic censored the social media of "the Covenant" and "Neighborhood youth alliance", leadership of the movement shifted to a coalition of Iranian opposition leaders, including the crown prince of Iran Reza Pahlavi. They disseminated their messages primarily through TV channels like the BBC. However, despite their efforts, the movement eventually collapsed.

Mohammed Khatami, Iran's former reformist president, said the "beautiful slogan" of "women, life, and freedom" shows that Iranian society was moving towards a better future.

== Awards ==
In 2023, Shervin Hajipour won a new Social Merit Award for the best protest song due to him singing "Baraye," during the Mahsa movement. US first lady Jill Biden presented the award at the 2023 Grammy Awards. This award is now presented annually, in the name of activist musician Harry Belafonte.

One of the attorneys behind this submission of Shervin's song was Katy Amiri-Younesi Esq. and later on, with Taylor Hansen collaboration they have put together a project called "The Voices Project." Katy and Taylor managed to have 16,000 voices singing the chorus for the new version of "Baraye," in support of this movement.

The movement was awarded the 2023 Freedom Award by Freedom House and the Sakharov Prize for Freedom of Thought, both in October 2023.

== Slogans ==
- "Reza shah rohat shad" (rest in peace Reza Shah)
- “Marg Bar Khamenei" (Death to Khamenei)
- “Jomhouri Eslami" (the Islamic Republic)
- “Marg Bar Dictator” (Death to the dictator)
- Go ahead for revolution whether with/without hejab
- “Zan, Zendegi, Azadi” (Woman Life Freedom)
- "Rahbar" (Supreme Leader)

== See also ==
- Mahsa Amini protests
- Political repression in the Islamic Republic of Iran
- Political slogans against the Islamic Republic of Iran
- Iranian opposition
