= Az Khoon-e Javanan-e Vatan =

Iranian song

"From the Blood of the Youth of the Homeland, Tulips Sprouted"

Song by Aref Qazvini
- Genre: Persian traditional music (in Dastgah Dashti)
- Composer: Aref Qazvini
- Lyricist: Aref Qazvini

Az Khoon-e Javanan-e Vatan (Persian: از خون جوانان وطن, lit. 'From the Blood of the Youth of the Homeland') is the seventh and most famous tasnif by Aref Qazvini. This tasnif is also known by the titles The Secret of the Heart and Time of Wine.

The theme of this tasnif refers to the legend that tulips grew from the blood drops of Siavash (one of the heroes of the Shahnameh). The message of this song, even after a century, remains prominent in the political literature of modern Iranian history.

In his divan (collection of works), Aref Qazvini wrote an introduction to this tasnif:

This tasnif was composed during the second period of the National Consultative Assembly in Tehran. Due to the affection that Haydar Khan Amo-oghli had for it, I wish for this tasnif to be dedicated to the memory of that departed soul. This tasnif was written at the start of the Iranian Constitutional Revolution in memory of the first martyrs of freedom.

== Performances ==
The first performance of this tasnif was by Aref himself. He sang it accompanied only by a setar (Persian lute). Currently, no audio recordings of Aref’s performances exist. Over the years, this tasnif was performed by various singers such as Eftekhar, Zari, and Amjad (1912), Abdollah Davami (1914), and Asgar Abdullayev (in Tbilisi during the same period). One of the most famous recorded renditions of this tasnif was performed by Elahé around the 1960s in the Radio program Golhaye Rangarang with a 50-piece orchestra. This arrangement was based on oral accounts of Aref’s original performance.

However, the most renowned performance of this work took place in 1972, sung by Mohammad Reza Shajarian and accompanied by Sheyda Ensemble led by Mohammad Reza Lotfi. In 1979, a new arrangement by Faramarz Payvar was recorded, again with Mohammad Reza Shajarian's voice, performed by the Payvar Ensemble and featured in the album Raz-e Del.

Other notable renditions include those by Salar Aghili, Leila Forouhar, Alireza Ghorbani, Parisa, Sima Bina Mehrdad Asemani, Sima Mafiha, Parviz Parastui, and Parastoo Ahmadi (who performed it in 2022 during the Mahsa Amini protests).
