= Iranian protests against compulsory hijab =

Series of protests in Iran

- "Girls of Enghelab" protests Part of the Iranian Democracy Movement
- Date: 27 December 2017 – present (as Mahsa Amini protests) (8 years, 10 months, 2 weeks and 4 days)
- Location: Iran
- Goals: Removal of mandatory hijab law in Iran, enforced since 1979
- Methods: Civil disobedience; Nonviolent resistance
- Result: Continued rise of Iranian democracy movement; Escalation into Mahsa Amini protests following the death of Mahsa Amini in September 2022

Parties
Iranian protesters Police, Military, Militant, and Security Force Defectors Support: House of Pahlavi	Government of Iran; Police Command; Special Units Command; Guidance Patrol; Islamic Revolutionary Guard Corps; Basij; Plainclothes; Foreign militias; Iranian counter-protesters

Lead figures
Reza Pahlavi; Ali Karimi	Ali Khamenei X; Hassan Rouhani; Ebrahim Raisi †

Casualties
- Arrested: At least 40

The Girls of Enghelab protests (Persian: دختران انقلاب, romanized: Dokhtaran Enghalab) are protests against the compulsory hijab in Iran and are part of the wider Iranian Democracy Movement.

The protests were inspired by Vida Movahed, an Iranian woman known as the Girl of Enghelab Street (Persian: دختر خیابان انقلاب, romanized: Dokhtar Khiaban Enghalab), who stood above the crowd on a utility box on Enghelab Street (Revolution Street) in Tehran on 27 December 2017 during the 2017–2018 Iranian protests, tying a white headscarf to a stick, and waving it to the crowd as a flag. She was arrested that day and was released temporarily on bail a month later, on 28 January 2018.

Some people interpreted Movahed's action as being based on Masih Alinejad's call for White Wednesdays, a protest movement that the presenter at VOA Persian Television started in early 2017. Other women later re-enacted her protest and posted photos of their actions on social media. These women are described as the "Girls of Enghelab Street" and the "Girls of Revolution Street" in English sources. Some of the protesters however claim that they were not following Masih Alinejad's call. The protests intensified in 2022 due to the death of Mahsa Amini.

== Symbol ==
The safety pin of the Girls of the Revolution Street

== Islamic Republic's Penal Code ==
Under the judicial system of the Islamic Republic of Iran imposed shortly after the Iranian Revolution of 1979, article 638 of the 5th book of Islamic Penal Code, called "Sanctions and deterrent penalties", states that women who do not wear a hijab may be imprisoned from ten days to two months and/or required to pay fines from Rls.50,000 to Rls.500,000. Fines are recalculated in the courts to index for inflation. This has been translated and published by the Legal Information Institute of Cornell Law School.

Article 639 states that two categories of people shall be sentenced to between one and ten years' imprisonment; first, a person who establishes or directs a place of immorality or prostitution, and second, a person who facilitates or encourages people to commit immorality or prostitution.

These are some of the laws under which some protesters were charged. During the Iranian revolution in 1979, the veil was used as a way to protest The Pahlavi government.

== Background ==
Before the Iranian Revolution, during the reign of Mohammad Reza Pahlavi, the hijab was not compulsory, although some Iranian women chose to wear headscarves or chadors.

Following the 1979 Islamic revolution, the hijab gradually became mandatory. In 1979, Ruhollah Khomeini announced that women should observe the Islamic dress code; His statement sparked demonstrations with the 1979 International Women's Day protests in Tehran, which were met by government assurances that the statement was only a recommendation. The hijab was subsequently made mandatory in government and public offices in 1980, and in 1983 it became mandatory for all women.

In 2018, a government-run survey dating back to 2014 was released by President Hassan Rouhani, showing that 49.8% of Iranians were against compulsory or mandatory hijab. The report was released by the Center for Strategic Studies, the research arm of the Iranian President's office, and was titled "Report of the first hijab special meeting" in July 2014 in a PDF format.

On 2 February 2018, a poll conducted by the Center for International and Security Studies at Maryland (CISSM) showed that a few Iranians agreed with "changing Iran's political system or relaxing strict Islamic law".

An independent survey by GAMAAN conducted in 2020 showed that 58% of Iranians did not believe in hijab altogether, and 72% were against compulsory hijab rules. Only 15% insisted on the legal obligation to wear it in public.

Iran is the only country in the world that requires non-Muslim female residents to wear a headscarf. In January 2018, a Chinese female musician had a black cloth placed over her head after her hijab fell off in the middle of her concert performance. The event was described as "suppression", "humiliating", and "shameful".

== Timeline ==
=== December 2017 ===
==== 27 December ====
On 27 December 2017, pictures and videos of Movahed waving her scarf went viral through the hashtag "Where_is_she?" (#دختر_خیابان_انقلاب_کجاست, "Where is the girl of Enghelab Street" in Persian) on social media. While at first she was unknown, days later, Nasrin Sotoudeh, the human rights activist and lawyer who has also been arrested, found out that the woman was 31 years old and had been arrested on the spot with her 19-month-old baby.

=== January 2018 ===
==== 28 January ====
On 28 January 2018, according to Nasrin Sotoudeh, the lawyer investigating the case, Vida Movahed was released temporarily on bail.

==== 29 January ====
On 29 January 2018, a woman was arrested in Tehran after reenacting Movahed's protest by standing on the same utility box in Enqelab Street, taking off her white hijab, and holding it up on a stick. Photos posted on social media show that at least three other women reenacted Movahed's protest in Tehran on 29 January, including one near Ferdowsi Square.

==== 30 January ====
According to Nasrin Sotoudeh on 30 January 2018, the second woman who was arrested on 29 January 2018 was Narges Hosseini (Persian: نرگس حسینی); her age was 32.

On 30 January 2018, several more women, but also men, protested against the compulsory hijab law by reenacting Movahed's protest. This took place in Tehran, as well as other cities as well including Esfahan and Shiraz.

=== February 2018 ===
==== 1 February ====
On 1 February 2018 the Iranian Police department announced they had arrested 29 women for taking off their hijab.

==== 2 February ====
According to Nasrin Sotoudeh, the Iranian lawyer, Narges Hosseini, known as the second Girl of Enghelab Street, who was 32 years old, was unable to pay the US$135,000 bail set by the judge presiding over her case, facing a possible 10 years in prison and up to 74 lashes on charges including openly committing a sinful act.

==== 15 February ====
New photos and video shared on social media show another woman re-enacting Movahed's protest on the same street, Enghelab Street (Revolution Street) on 15 February 2018. She was identified as Azam Jangravi on videos, showing the police taking her down aggressively. According to her latest Instagram picture, she said that she was a part of Iranian women Reformists and Executives of Construction Party and had taken no orders from someone either inside or outside the country and had done that to protest against compulsory hijab.

==== 17 February ====
Narges Hosseini and Azam Jangravi were released from custody temporarily on bail.

==== 21 February ====
Another female protester named Shaparak Shajarizadeh (Persian: شاپرک شجری زاده) was arrested protesting with a white scarf on Wednesday, 21 February 2018 in a Gheytarieh street; eyewitnesses said that the police attacked her from behind and took her in custody.

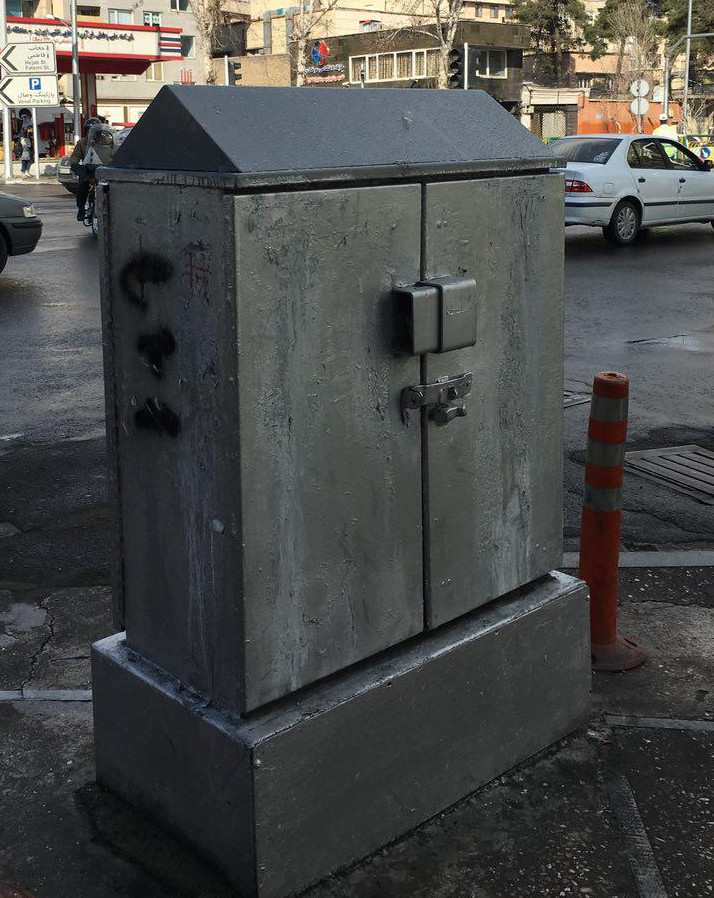
The original utility box that Vida Movahed and other protesters stood on top of, located in the Enghelab–Vesal Junction in Tehran. It has since been altered by the government to prevent protesters from standing on its top.

Photos shared on social media show that the government was placing an inverted v-shaped iron structure on the utility boxes so as to inhibit anyone standing on top of the boxes. She was sentenced to two years in prison in addition to an 18-year suspended prison term. In addition, she stated that she left Iran.

==== 22 February ====
Another woman named Maryam Shariatmadari (Persian: مریم شریعتمداری) was protesting compulsory hijab in the afternoon on a utility box; the police asked her to come down and upon her refusal, was violently ejected by the police, subsequently suffering a broken leg. (Note: In September 2020, Maryam Shariatmadari, a 32-year-old computer science student at Amir Kabir University who escaped to Turkey after two days detention in Iran in 2018, was arrested in Denizli to be deported back to Iran.)

Meanwhile Shaparak Shajarizadeh was beaten up in custody and released later temporarily on bail.

==== 24 February ====
Eyewitnesses said that another woman named Hamraz Sadeghi (Persian: همراز صادقی) was protesting compulsory hijab on Saturday, 24 February 2018 when she was attacked by an unknown security force, who broke her arm and arrested her.

=== July 2018 ===
==== 8 July ====
On 8 July 2018, Iranian teenager Maedeh Hojabri was arrested after she posted videos of herself dancing to Western and Iranian music on her Instagram account without any headcovering. She was among several popular Instagram users, with more than 600,000 followers. Her videos were shared by hundreds of people, triggering a wave of Iranian women posting videos of themselves dancing to protest her arrest on social media.

=== October 2018 ===
==== 27 October ====
On 27 October 2018, students in Islamic Azad University, Central Tehran Branch protested after a morality police van entered the campus and attempted to arrest several women for improper hijab. Videos showed a student standing in front of the van, attempting to block its exit, which led the driver to attempt to run her over.

==== 29 October ====
On 29 October 2018, an Iranian woman standing on the dome of Enghelab square in Tehran, removed her headscarf to protest the compulsory hijab. She was arrested minutes later by the police. and subsequently on 14th April 2019, identified as Vida Movahed, the original Girl of Enghelab Street.

=== February 2019 ===
==== 15 February ====
On 15 February 2019, the morality police attempted to arrest two girls for improper hijab in the Narmak area of Tehran and was met with resistance from bystanders. A group of people gathered around the Police van to vandalize it and managed to free the two girls held captive inside. A video from the incident shows police firing shots into air to disperse the crowd, which was later confirmed by the Tehran police.

=== March 2019 ===
==== 7 March ====
On 7 March 2019, two women were arrested in Kangavar in protest by walking the streets of the city without their hijab on.

==== 8 March ====
On International Women's Day (8 March), groups of women in Tehran appeared unveiled to protest against the oppression of women. A video showed two unveiled women holding a red sign, which read "International Women's Day is a promise of a just world for all of humanity", on Valiasr Street. Another video showed a group of unveiled women on a Tehran Metro car handing out flowers to passengers.

==== 11 March ====
On 11 March 2019, a man stood on a box on Enghelab street and waved a white scarf on a stick. He was arrested on the scene by the security forces.

=== May 2019 ===
==== 13 May ====
On 13 May 2019, students at the University of Tehran gathered to protest the increasing pressures to obey the mandatory headscarf rule. Plainclothes vigilantes attacked students who were protesting. Students also carried signs demanding freedom and free elections.

=== August 2019 ===
In August 2019, Iranian civil rights activist Saba Kord Afshari was sentenced to 24 years behind bars, including a 15-year term for taking off her hijab in public, which Iranian authorities say promoted "corruption and prostitution".

=== September 2022 ===
On 16 September 2022, a 22-year-old Iranian woman named Mahsa Amini was killed in custody of the Guidance Patrol in Tehran due to police brutality. Many people from all over the world reacted to Amini's death, and sparked a series of anti-hijab protests across the country.

On 20 September 2022, 16-year-old Iranian teenager Nika Shakarami (Persian: نیکا شاکرمی) disappeared in Tehran during the 2022 Iranian protests following the death of Mahsa Amini. Her family was informed of her death ten days later. She had died under suspicious circumstances suspected to involve violence by security forces.

Many women demonstrators have defiantly taken off their hijabs and burned them in bonfires or symbolically cut their hair in protest.

=== November 2024 ===
On 2 November 2024, Iranian student Ahoo Daryaei, who stripped to her bra and underwear in hijab protest after members of Basij shouted at her, grabbed her aggressively, attempted to pull her clothes off and tried to drag her into an internal room used to punish female students accused of violating dress rules after her headscarf fell from her head while she was walking through the university and looking at her phone was forced into psychiatric treatment.

=== February 2025 ===
On 6 February 2025, a woman stands naked on the hood of a police car in Mashhad as part of a protest against Iran's compulsory hijab law.

== Other grassroot initiatives for uprising ==
Many young Iranians have formed decentralized underground networksand local neighbourhood alliances to coordinate protests and demonstrations, share safety information and publish manifestos:

- The United Youth of Iran (UYI) was first formed as an umbrella coalition connecting dozens of underground youth protest groups, student organizations and worker associations. In late 2022 they published a manifesto calling to dismantle the current regime and form a secular government.
- The Neighborhood Youth Alliances (Javanan-e Mahallat) were informal anonymous local groups forming in the cities of Isfahan, Teheran and Shiraz. They specialized in local flash-mob protests, coordinated strikes and used twitter and Telegram to bypass the Regime's censorship.
- Students in general, in univerisites and high-schools formed the core of early protests on Campuses. They openly defied gender-segregation rules on campus-dining halls, chanted against the religious authorities and held sit-ins.

== Reactions ==
=== National ===
- Iranian chief prosecutor, Mohammad Jafar Montazeri reacted to the protests on 31 January 2018 by calling them "trivial" and "childish" moves that were incited by foreigners.
- The deputy speaker of parliament, Ali Motahari, said on 31 January 2018 that there was no compulsory hijab in Iran, since women would show up wearing whatever they liked.
- A member of the Iranian parliament, Soheila Jolodarzadeh said on 31 January 2018 that the protests resulted from the unnecessary restriction of women.
- Iranian Judiciary spokesman, Gholam-Hossein Mohseni-Eje'i on 4 February 2018 said that some of the arrested women were on "synthetic drugs"; he also declared that if it was proven that their protests were organized, their crime would be much heavier.
- President Hassan Rouhani said on 11 February, the 39th anniversary of Islamic Revolution, that under the article 59 of the constitution, any conflicts in Iranian society could be resolved with a constitutional referendum.
- Iranian senior actress and director Marzieh Boroumand stated on 14 February 2018 that she was against compulsory hijab but she did not support Masih Alinejad's lead on the movement. She believed that Alinejad was trying to connect all protests inside the country to her own by telling the government that the protesters were receiving orders from her.
- Nahid Khodakarami, an Iranian midwife and a member of City Council of Tehran said that choosing their own clothes is the simplest right that women could have. Her reaction to the video of Azam Jangravi's arrest was "Which one has more sin, the hairs of Azam Jangravi or that man's hand?"
- An academic – "Who and based on what article of the law allowed the police to eject that woman like that?", asked Abdollah Ramezanzadeh on 22 February 2018.

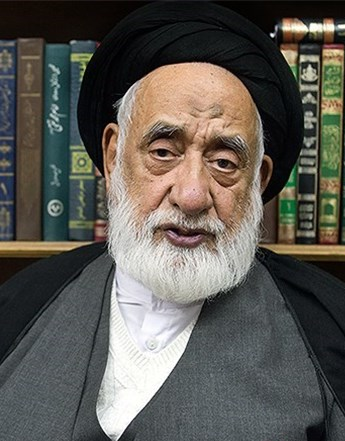
Seyyed Mehdi Tabatabaei, an Iranian Shia cleric, said that forcing hijab on people was against Islam and would have a reverse result.

- Seyyed Mehdi Tabatabaei, an Iranian Shia cleric reacted to the arrests on 22 February 2018 by saying that hijab was a requirement in Islam, while questioning the act of forcing it on people.
- The Iranian police officially warned on 23 February 2018 that the punishment of removing hijabs was of up to 10 years of imprisonment, based on Article 639 of the law.
- The Ghanoon (The Law) Newspaper published a main page article on 24 February 2018 written by Mehrshad Imani, titled "Let's not call hijabless people prostitutes," based on Article 639 of the law.
- In a speech at the University of Isfahan in 2018, Farhad Meysamy called the Girls of Enghelab Street movement an example of civil non-violence movements.

=== International ===
- Amnesty International on 24 January 2018 called on the Iranian government to free the arrested woman unconditionally. On 2 February 2018 Amnesty International repeated their statement to release six human rights defenders including protester Shima Babaei, who was arrested on 1 February 2018.
- Heather Nauert, spokeswoman of the United States Department of State, issued a statement on 2 February 2018 condemning "the reported arrests of at least 29 individuals for exercising their human rights and fundamental freedoms by standing up against the compulsory hijab."
- On 6 February 2018, a campaign on social media with the hashtag #NoHijabDay trended, with women from around the world burning their hijabs in solidarity with Iranian women forced to wear hijab.
- The director of the Middle East Program at Wilson Center, Haleh Esfandiari an Iranian-born American based in Washington stated in a February 2018 interview with Axios that her opinion was that the protests were causing a stir but were not a movement yet.
- Sarah Leah Whitson, former director of the Middle East division of Human Rights Watch, requested on 24 February 2018 for the Iranian government to drop the charges against the protesters.
- 45 Members of the European Parliament on 28 February 2018 called on EU Foreign Policy Chief Federica Mogherini to support the Iranian Women's Anti-Compulsory-Hijab Protests.

== See also ==
- Death of Mahsa Amini
- Mahsa Amini protests
- Guidance Patrol, Iran's morality police
- Homa Darabi
- Iranian schoolgirls mass poisoning reports
- 1979 International Women's Day protests in Tehran
