= Theology of the body =

Christian teachings on the human body

The theology of the body is a term used in Christian theology to refer to the teaching of various Christian denominations on the human body as it relates to God and the church.

== Church Fathers ==
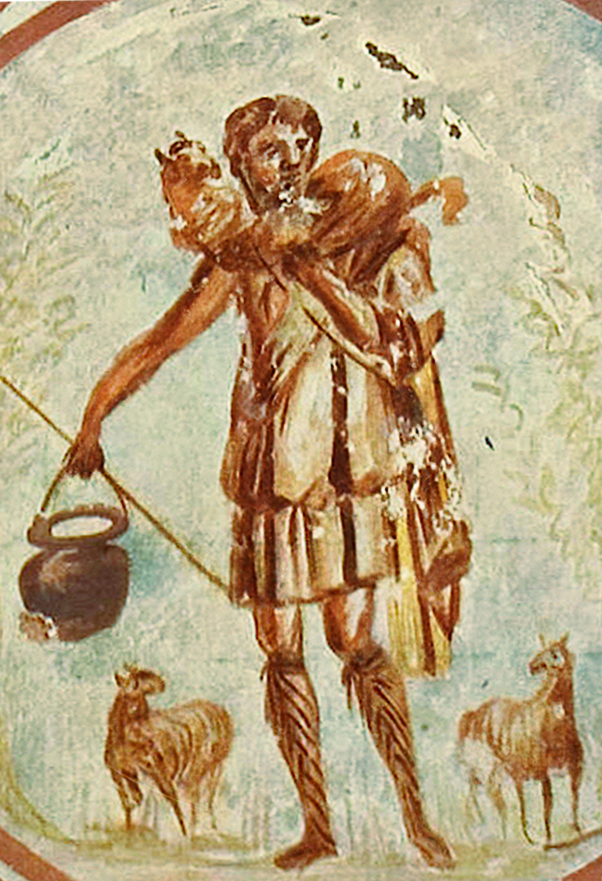
The Shepherd of Hermas, or the Good Shepherd, 3rd century, Catacombs of Rome

The Early Church Fathers wrote extensively on the theology of the body, especially with regard to Christian marriage.

Saint Ignatius of Antioch (died AD 108) taught that "It is right for men and women who marry to be united with the bishop's approval. In that way their marriage will follow God's will and not the promotings of lust. Let everything be done so as to advance God's honor." He emphasized marriage as a component of the baptismal commitments of Christian couples.

The Shepherd of Hermas, authored in the second century, forbids spouses to remarry after a divorce has occurred. It furthermore encouraged reconciliation among divorced spouses in cases of adultery. While permitting marriage after the death of a spouse, it taught that a widow/widower who remained single "gains...more extraordinary honor and great glory with the Lord."

Saint Justin Martyr (AD 100–165) distinguished between the sexual promiscuity of the pagan Romans and "the behavior of Christians whom he said only marry for the sake of bringing up children." In this era, Christians who did not wish to have children "renounced marriage" and lived in "perfect continence".

Saint Athenagoras of Athens (AD 133–190) taught that "According to our laws, each of us thinks of the woman he has married as his wife only for the purpose of bearing children. For as the farmer casts his seed on the soil and awaits the harvest without sowing over it, so we limit the pleasure of intercourse to bearing children."

The views held by Saint Justin Martyr and Saint Athenagoras of Athens were held by the early Christians, who held that the purpose of marriage "was the procreation and education of children", opposing "engaging in sexual activity for the hedonistic pursuit of pleasure."

Lactantius (A.D. 240—320) "extolled marriage as a sublime and essential expression of Christian love":

He rejected the old Jewish laws of sexual purity in the name of Christian freedom, allowing sexual intercourse and intimacy with one's spouse even during menstruation and pregnancy. And he urged older or sterile couples to maintain healthy sex lives, even after the window of fertility had closed. This not only protected the couple from sexual sin but also fostered in them mutual love and harmony.

Lactantius' views were characteristic of other contemporary Church Fathers, such as Clement of Alexandria.

== Teaching by Christian denomination ==
=== Catholicism ===
In Catholic theology, "God intends for sex to express the mutual self-giving of a man and woman joined in marriage." Pope John Paul II, in his Theology of the Body, taught that the Bible encourages Christians to "experience the joys of physical union as a sign of the deeper spiritual union of marriage".

=== Lutheranism ===
The Lutheran churches emphasize the role of the Holy Spirit, who has sanctified the bodies of Christians to be a temple. Amongst His creation was included the human body, which God called "very good".

The importance of the human body was delineated in the bodily resurrection of Jesus, in which Christ arose from the dead in his body, not just in spirit. In Lutheran theology, this is important with respect to the resurrection of the dead at the Last Judgment. It is for this reason that the Lutheran churches have historically discouraged the practice of cremation.

=== Methodism ===
Methodist theology emphasizes seven pillars that substantiate the theology of the body:

1. God's creation is good and therefore trustworthy. In the Book of Genesis, the first book of the Pentateuch in the Bible, God's creation is called good seven times, the Biblical number of perfection.
2. The physical body points to spiritual mysteries, chiefly the incarnation of Jesus, in which Jesus entered the world in the form of a human body. This is emphasized when Jesus declares (from Psalm 40:6) "a body you have prepared for me" (cf. Hebrews 10:5). The means of grace occur through the human body:

As Wesleyans, it is also important to understand that all of the "means of grace" happen in and through the body. Our bodies are baptized. We take communion with our mouths. We hear the preaching of God's word with our ears. Our eyes read God's word. Our bodies are not only pointers to the incarnation, but the ongoing bridges by which God continues to extend his grace into the world. Charles Wesley captured this beautifully in his hymn Celebrate Immanuel's Name, writing, "God is in our flesh revealed; heaven and earth in Jesus join / mortal with immortal filled, and human with divine."

1. Our bodies are designed to be relational. Holy Matrimony points to the mystery of "Christ and the Church". The beginning and end of Sacred Scripture is with marriage, with Adam and Eve being wed in the Garden of Eden and the Revelation of Saint John the Divine culminating "in the marriage supper of the Lamb where Christ is eternally wed to his church".
2. Childbearing points to the mystery of the Holy Trinity. The bearing of children allows humans to synergistically participate with God in the act of creation of new life, with humans being made in the image of God. The threefold nature of the father, mother and children points to the Holy Trinity: God the Father, God the Son, and God the Holy Ghost.
3. Celibacy points humans to life in the hereafter as "in the resurrection people will neither marry nor be given in marriage" Mark 12:25. In Methodist theology, marriage is not an end in and of itself as the ultimate goal is eternal union with Jesus Christ. Humans who are living the celibate life "are already living out the future reality in the present." As such, Saint Paul teaches Christians to "practice temporary celibacy within the state of marriage (1 Cor. 7:5)."
4. The sacramental nature of the human body is for the evangelisation of the world. This is revealed to others when Christians go out in the world in their baptized bodies. The sacrament of the Lord's Supper "mysteriously transforms us into spiritual bread for a hungry and needy world."
5. The sacramental nature of the human body "transforms the whole of ordinary life." Daily tasks such as washing dishes and folding clothes are the "means by which we can develop liturgical rhythms in our daily lives" and allow Christians to say to others "this is my body, given for you." It destroys the false dichotomy of the sacred and secular, bringing God into all spheres of human life.

== See also ==
- Christian anthropology
- Christian psychology
