= Mehdi Tabatabaei =

Iranian cleric and politician (1936–2018)

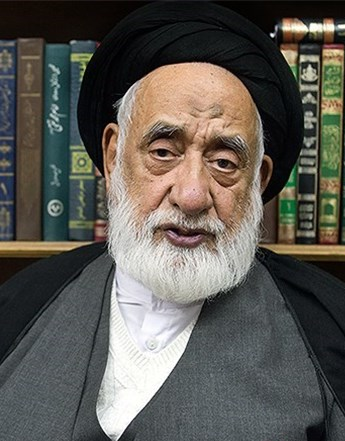

Member of the Parliament of Iran
- In office 28 May 2004 – 28 May 2008
- Constituency: Tehran, Rey, Shemiranat and Eslamshahr
- Majority: 660,764 (33.51%)
- In office 28 May 1984 – 28 May 1988
- Constituency: Mashhad and Kalat
- Majority: 243,600 (51.50%)

Personal details
- Born: Seyyed Mohammad-Mehdi Tabatabaei Shirazi; 21 March 1936 Rafsanjan, Iran
- Died: 17 May 2018 (aged 82) Tehran, Iran
- Party: Combatant Clergy Association; Fada'iyan-e Islam
- Other political affiliations: Alliance of Builders of Islamic Iran (2004)

Seyyed Mehdi Tabatabaei Shirazi (Persian: سید مهدی طباطبایی شیرازی, March 21, 1936 — May 17, 2018) was an Iranian Shia cleric and conservative politician who served as member of the Parliament of Iran from 2004 to 2008, representing the districts of Tehran, Rey, Shemiranat and Eslamshahr. He represented Mashhad and Kalat from 1984 to 1988.

Tabatabaei had been described as a "well-known moderate conservative cleric".

== Views ==
Tabatabaei was a critic of Mahmoud Ahmadinejad, and a supporter of the Iran deal.

In 2009, he said he wished he had died and not seen the post-election incidents in Iran.
