= Manteau =

Manteau is a word of French origin meaning cloak, gown or overcoat.

Manteau may refer to:

- Angèle Manteau (1911–2008), Belgian publisher
  - Manteau (publisher), a Belgian imprint

== See also ==
- Manto (disambiguation)
- Sous le Manteau, a 1948 French documentary filmed in Austria
