= Neighbourhood Youth Alliance of Iran =

- Formation: December 2022
- Purpose: Opposition to the Iranian Government
- Location: Iran
- Remarks: Promotes protests

The Neighbourhood Youth Alliance of Iran (Persian: اتحاد جوانان محلات ایران, Ettehad-e Javanan-e Mahallat-e Iran, lit. transl. Alliance of the Youth of the Neighbourhoods of Iran) or United Youth of Iran is an alliance of local grassroots groups of Iranian youth created during the Mahsa Amini protests in late 2022. The Alliance described its aims as organising protests in order to overthrow the Islamic Republic, replacing it by a secular state that respects international human rights treaties.

== Creation ==
During the Mahsa Amini protests that followed the death of Mahsa Amini in Iran in September 2022, grassroots youth protest groups started with a group forming in Tehran in late September and early October 2022. By mid-October, Youth of Tehran Neighbourhoods or Tehran Youth had organised rallies in Tehran and called for national-level protests, published eight statements that were seen by Iran International as "breath[ing] new life into the [protest] movement". Protests of thousands of people in several different towns on 9 and 12 October were attributed by Iran International as being the result of the group's organising that bypassed internet blocks. The group called for a protest on 15 October and for people to chant "Down with the Dictator". On 19 October, the group called for protests throughout Iran and in Berlin on the following weekend, and stated, "We need to remember that the regime of the Islamic Republic is not representing the people of Iran. We support the campaign to expel the ambassadors and mercenaries of the regime from the nests of corruption and terror [Iranian embassies] in all countries."

On 4 December 2022, thirty local youth groups announced their coordination as the Neighbourhood Youth Alliance of Iran (also translated as United Youth of Iran).

== Structure ==
The Alliance is seen as an "umbrella" organisation for individual groups that "somewhat differ in tone and language" while sharing broad aims. The network expanded to include groups from 35 cities, and then shrank to 25 cities by September 2023 due to arrests and executions.

== Aims ==
The Alliance stated in December 2022 that it aimed to overthrow the Islamic Republic and to promote democracy and universal human rights. It described its objectives as "coordinat[ing] planning to advance the revolution to victory and also creat[ing] the necessary infrastructure to manage the country's affairs during the critical periods of the transition of power".

The Alliance promotes the motto "Woman, Life, Freedom". The Alliance called for retaining the territorial integrity of Iran.

In September 2023, the main aims were described as retaining motivation for "the fire of revolution" and "educat[ing] and prepar[ing] those fighting on the streets, [aiming to] minimise the casualties."

=== Manifesto ===
On 11 December 2022, the Alliance published a 43-point manifesto calling for the creation of a democratic government and supporting ethnic, gender, political and religious diversity. The manifesto aimed to promote cooperation among commercial organisations, trade unions, political groups and activists in and outside of Iran. The manifesto calls for separation between religious organisations and the state and a secular (anti-islamic) state.

The manifesto calls for the post-revolutionary government of Iran to be committed to the Universal Declaration of Human Rights, the International Covenant on Civil and Political Rights, the International Covenant on Economic, Social and Cultural Rights, the Convention on the Elimination of All Forms of Discrimination Against Women and the Convention on the Rights of the Child.

== Methods ==
The Alliance stated that its methods include locating CCTV cameras and cutting their connections, preparing medical teams, and making leaflets for offline communication. Techniques for reducing repression by the authorities include minimal reliance on online social media and making last-minute changes for meeting locations.

In September 2023, some of the methods were inspired by Myanmar protests.

== Actions ==
As a united group, the Alliance called for a three-day series of protests on 5, 6 and 7 December 2022.

On 10 December, the Youth of Tehran Neighbourhoods called for the Iranian diaspora to form a coalition to support protestors within Iran.

== Repression ==
During 2023, authorities' responses to the Alliance included arrests and killing of Alliance members, and disinformation aiming to associate the Alliance with "dubious political groups".

== See also ==
- Local Coordination Committees of Syria
- Sudanese resistance committees
