= Vida Movahed =

Iranian human rights activist and protester

- Born: Vida Movahedi; 1985 (age 40–41); Tehran, Iran
- Occupation: Women's right activist
- Years active: Since 2018
- Known for: Leading protests against the compulsory hijab in Iran.

Vida Movahedi (Persian: ویدا موحدی; born 1985 in Tehran), more commonly known as Vida Movahed, is an Iranian human rights activist, protester, and women's rights activist who is considered the initiator of the Girls of Enghelab movement. On December 27, 2017, on the Enghelab Street in Tehran, she symbolically took her white headscarf off to protest against the mandatory hijab in Iran. Subsequently, her picture was published as "The Girl of Enghelab Street".

== The first protest ==
On December 27, 2017, Vida Movahed removed her headscarf and stood on a utility box to protest against the mandatory hijab while moving her headscarf, which was tied to a stick. She was immediately arrested. On January 27, she was released after spending a month in custody.

== The second protest ==
On October 29, 2018, Movahed held a number of balloons and went to the top of the turquoise dome of the Enghelab square to protest against the compulsory hijab. Subsequently, she was arrested again and sentenced to one year in prison for the crime of encouraging people to commit corruption and prostitution through the removal of the hijab.

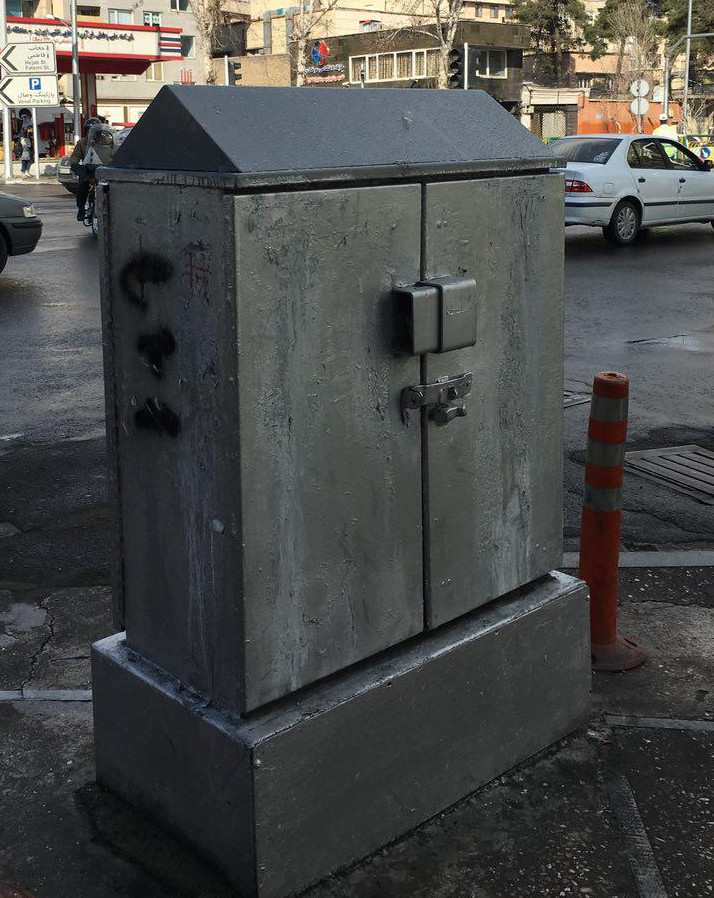
The original utility box that Vida Movahed and other protesters stood on top of, located in the Enghelab–Vesal Junction in Tehran. It has since been altered by the government to prevent protesters from standing on its top.

== See also ==
- Nasrin Sotoudeh
- Narges Mohammadi
- Women's rights movement in Iran
