= Larijani family =

Iranian religious Shia family

Larijani family لاریجانی خاندان Larijani
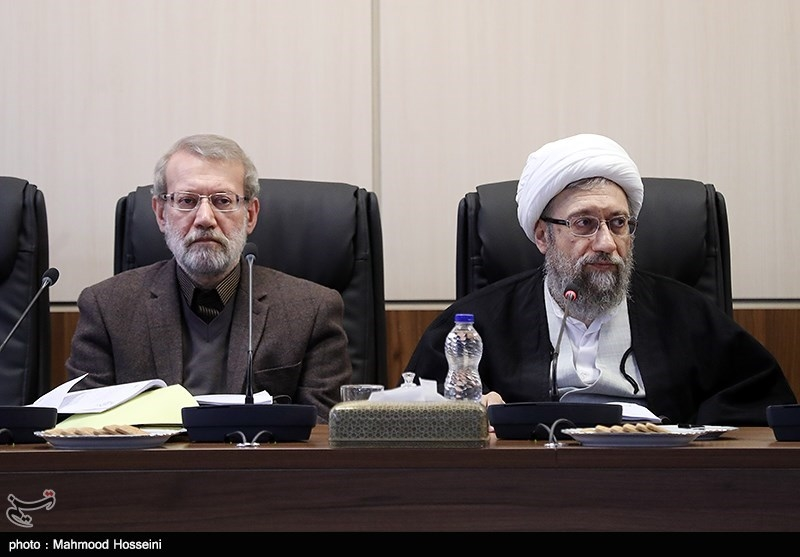
- Ali Larijani (left) and Sadeq Larijani (right), both members of the family
- Founded: Larijan District, Guarded Domains of Iran
- Founder: Hashim Larijani
- Members: List: Mohammad Javad Larijani Ali Larijani Sadiq Larijani Bagher Larijani Fazel Larijani Fazala Larijani Hadi Ardeshir Larijani Farideh Motahhari Fatemeh Ardashir Mohammad Reza Larijani Amir Larijani
- Connected members: List: Esmail Khorasani Hossein Wahid Khorasani Morteza Motahhari Azam (Aliyeh) Rouhani Mohammad Motahari Ali Motahari Narges Ansari Mirza Abul Hassan Vaez Javadi Amoli Abdollah Javadi Amoli Ahmad Tavakkoli Saeid Zibakalam Sadegh Zibakalam Maryam Zebkalam Sara Zebkalam Dr. Fatima Zebkalam

The Larijani family (Persian: خاندان لاریجانی, romanized: Khāndān e Larījānī) is an Iranian religious Shia family of Mazanderani origin. It is prominent in Iranian politics and sometimes considered a political dynasty.

== History ==
Hashim Larijani was born in 1899 in Larijan, Iran and studied Islamic sciences in Amol, Tehran, and Qom. He then migrated to Najaf seminary and stayed there for thirty years. As such, his children were born mainly in Najaf. Larijani moved to Qom around 1963.

Hashim was the father of one daughter (Fazala Larijani) and five sons (Mohammad Javad Larijani, Fazel Larijani, Ali Larijani, Sadiq Larijani and Bagher Larijani), who have held positions in the government of Islamic Republic of Iran.

== Notable members ==
- Ali Larijani (1958–2026), former military officer and the former Speaker of the Majlis of Iran
- Mohammad Javad Larijani (born 1951), mathematician and former deputy Foreign Minister
- Bagher Larijani (born 1961), medical practitioner
- Fazel Larijani (born 1953), physicist and diplomat
- Sadiq Larijani (born 1963), Ayatollah and former head of the judicial system of Iran
