= Allameh Abul Hasan Sharani =

Iranian scholar (died 1973)

Ayatollah Sheykh Allameh Abul Hasan Sharani

Personal life
- Born: Abul Hasan c. 1902 Tehran, Iran
- Died: 3 November 1973 (aged 70–71) Hamburg, West Germany
- Buried: near Shah Abdol-Azim Shrine, Ray, Iran
- Main interest(s): Islamic philosophy, islamic jurisprudence

Religious life
- Religion: Islam

Allameh Abul Hasan Sharani (c. 1902 – 1973), known as 'Allama Sha'rani, was a Shi'a scholar and philosopher in the 20th century. he was an Iranian philosopher, teacher, author, jurist and Islamic theologian. He knew French and English, and was an expert in Quranic studies, hadith, fiqh, usul al-fiqh and kalam (Islamic theology). Thus he wrote many works in these areas.

His books include Falsafi ula (فلسفه اولی), which concerns the views of western philosophers about metaphysics and the immateriality of the soul, and Rah-i sa'adat (راه سعادت), which is an argument for prophecy and in particular, the prophecy of the Islamic prophet Muhammad.

Sharani for some time held the position of "Supervisor of Religious Affairs" (ناظر شرعیات) in the Ministry of Culture of the Pahlavi government, and from the 1332 to 1344 SH (c. 1953–c. 1965), he held the title of "Mujtahid of the Supreme Council of Culture." Sharani was a prominent member of the philosophical school of Tehran.

== Family ==
Abul Hasan Sharani was born in Tehran in 1320 Hijri (c. 1902). He was the son of Hajj Sheykh Muhammad. Sharani was the grandson of Abul Hasan Mujtahed Tehrani and Mulla Fathollah. Sharani had four sons and four daughters.

== Teachers ==
- Sheykh Muhammad
- Mirza Ali Akbar Khan Yazdi
- Mirza Mahmoud Qommi
- Sheykh Abdun Nabi Nouri
- Sayyed Hasan Modarres
- Mirza Taher Tonekaboni
- Mulla Muhammad Hidaji
- Sheykh Aqa Bozorg Tehrani
- Mirza Mehdi Ashtiani
- Sheykh Abdolkarim Haeri Yazdi (founder of the Qom Seminary)
- Sayyed Abutorab Khansari

== Pupils ==
- Mirza Hashem Amoli
- Hajj Mirza Ali Akbar Ghaffari
- Sheykh Ali Asqar Karbaschian (founder of Alavi School)
- Ayatollah Hassan Hassanzadeh Amoli
- Ayatollah Javadi Amoli
- Ayatollah Sayyed Razi Shirazi
- Mirza Ali Aqa Shahcheraghi
- Dr Mehdi Mohaqeq
- Dr Muhammad Khansari

== Career ==
Sharani taught in Sepahsalar Mosque and Marvi School. He taught as a full professor in the faculty of literature of Tehran University. He was also the Imam of the Houz Mosque. Sharani was fluent in French, Arabic and Persian.

== Death ==
In the final years of his life, Abul hasan contracted heart and lung disease, and after some time, due to the severity of his illness, he was sent to West Germany and was hospitalized in one of the hospitals in the city of Hamburg. Eventually, Sharani passed away in the hospital on 12 Aban 1352 SH (3 November 1973), and a few days later his body was transferred to Tehran. His body was finally buried near Shah Abdol-Azim Shrine in the city of Ray, in his family mausoleum.

== Works ==
Sharani has more than 35 published book titles in various branches of Islamic sciences, and some of his books have not yet been published. He wrote books on fiqh, kalam, philosophy and hadith.

- Sharani translated many valuable books such as al-Nafas al-Mahmoum and al-Sahifa al-Sajjadiyya from Arabic to Persian.
- Commentary notes on the book al-Wafi of Mulla Mohsen Fayz Kashani in 3 vols
- Notes on the book al-Kafi in 12 vols
- Notes On Majma' al-Bayan, a Quran commentary in 10 vols
- Corrections and notes on the book al-Safi, a Quran commentary in 2 vols
- Notes on Menhaj al-Sadeghin in 10 vols
- Explaining the book of Tajrid al-I'tiqad
- Preface and notes on Asrar al-Hikam
- Philosophical Idioms
- Translation of Flamarion to French

== Sources ==
- The biography and Scientific and cultural services of Allameh Mirza Abul hasan sharani. The council of works and Great Scientists Human. Iran. Tehran. 2005
- Nafas al Mahmoum, translated by Ayatollah shrani, Noore Mataf, Qom, 2009
- Akbar Sobout, The Narration of Knowing and Teaching, in The biogroghy and Scientific and cultural services of Allameh Mirza Abul hasan sharani. The council of works and Great Scientists Human. Iran. Tehran. 2005
- Qavvami Vaez, Allameh the great person in The biogroghy and Scientific and cultural services of Allameh Mirza Abul hasan sharani. The council of works and Great Scientists Human. Iran. Tehran. 2005
