= Mohammad-Javad Larijani =

Iranian politician, logician, and diplomat (born 1951)

- محمدجواد لاریجانی
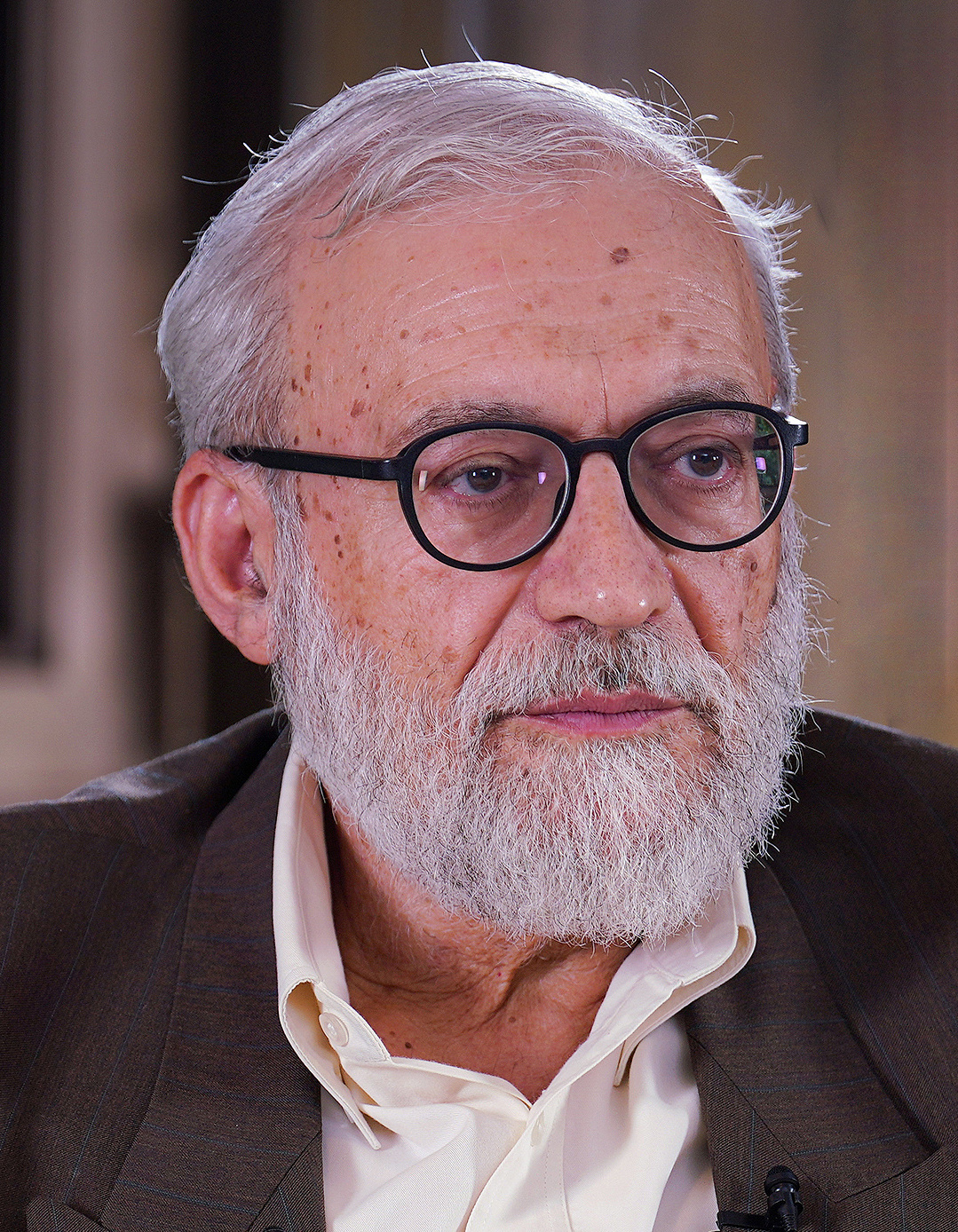
- Larijani in 2023

International Deputy for Chief Justice Secretary of High Council for Human Rights
- In office 27 July 2004 – 29 December 2019
- Appointed by: Mahmoud Hashemi Shahroudi
- Preceded by: Position established
- Succeeded by: Ali Bagheri

Member of the Parliament of Iran
- In office 28 May 1992 – 28 May 2000
- Constituency: Tehran, Rey, Shemiranat and Eslamshahr

Personal details
- Born: Mohammad-Javad Ardashir Larijani; 1951 (age 74–75) Najaf, Najaf Governorate, Kingdom of Iraq
- Parent: Mirza Hashem Amoli (father)
- Relatives: Ali Larijani (brother); Sadeq Larijani (brother); Bagher Larijani (brother); Abdollah Javadi-Amoli (uncle); Ahmad Tavakoli (cousin); Fazel Larijani (brother)
- Education: UC Berkeley; Sharif University of Technology

Mohammad-Javad Ardashir Larijani (Persian: محمدجواد اردشیر لاریجانی; born 1951) is a conservative Iranian Principlist politician and former diplomat. He was a top adviser to then Supreme Leader Ali Khamenei in foreign affairs, and secretary of the High Council for Human rights, Judiciary of Islamic Republic of Iran. He has been a key planner of Iran's foreign policy, and led the ceasefire negotiations after the Iran–Iraq War.

In response to the Mahsa Amini protests after she died in police custody for allegedly not wearing her hijab in accordance with government standards, in 2022 Larijani said that Mahsa Amini had been detained by the police for "public nudity."

== Early life and education ==
Mohammad Javad Larijani was born in Najaf, Iraq, to Iranian parents. His brother Ali Larijani was Secretary of the Supreme National Security Council when he was killed in March 2026. His brother Sadegh Larijani serves as the chairman of the Expediency Discernment Council of the System and was formerly the chief justice of Iran. Another brother of his is Fazel Larijani. Larijani was a cousin of Ahmad Tavakkoli who died in 2025, who had been the director of the Majlis Research Center, the research arm of the Iranian parliament .

He has a son named Hadi, who is a professor in the United Kingdom at Glasgow Caledonian University’s technology centre. He has another son named Sina who is a director for the Royal Bank of Canada in Vancouver, Canada.

Larijani, raised in a religious family, graduated from a hawza before starting his higher education in electrical engineering in Aryamehr University, wearing the uniform for the full four years and graduating in the 1970s. He later continued his studies outside Iran, and began to study in a PhD program in mathematics at the University of California, Berkeley in the late 1970s. However, he did not complete his studies at Berkeley.

== Career ==
=== Deputy Minister of Foreign Affairs (1981-1989) ===
Larijani served as deputy minister of foreign affairs from 1981 to 1989.

=== Member of Parliament (1992-2000) ===
He served as a Member of the Parliament of Iran from 1992 to 2000.

Larijani later became an adviser to Supreme Leader Ali Khamenei in the early 2000s.

=== Human Rights Council (2004-2019) ===
Larijani became secretary of the Iran judiciary’s human rights council, in which position he strongly denied that human rights violations took place in Iran.

In 2007, Larijani defended the use of stoning by the Iranian courts to kill an adulterer, despite international condemnation, and called it a feature of Islamic Shari'a law.

In a 2010 NBC News interview, Larijani defended the arrest of Nasrin Sotoudeh, an Iranian feminist activist, and a prominent human rights lawyer. Sotoudeh was detained in September 2010 and faced trial for "collusion against national security" and "spreading propaganda against the Islamic Republic." Larijani told NBC News that Iranian authorities believed that she was engaged "in a very nasty campaign" against Iran's national security. Nasrin Sotoudeh works for Shirin Ebadi's law firm. Shirin Ebadi is the 2003 Nobel Peace Prize recipient.

Beginning in 2011, the council rejected and condemned the appointment of the United Nations Special Rapporteur on Human Rights in Iran by the United Nations and strongly opposed the western countries' positions about the human rights situation in Iran.

Iran has repeatedly been accused of human rights violations, including after the 2019–2020 Iranian protests. The UN Report of the Special Rapporteur on the situation of human rights in the Islamic Republic of Iran reported in February 2020:

The Special Rapporteur is shocked at the number of deaths, serious injuries and reports of ill-treatment of persons detained during the November 2019 protests. According to reports, detainees are being tortured or are suffering other forms of ill-treatment, sometimes to extract forced confessions. There are also reports of denials of medical treatment, including for injuries caused by the excessive use of force by the security forces, with some other detainees being held incommunicado or being subjected to enforced disappearance. He is concerned about reports that families of individuals killed by the security forces have been threatened not to speak out. He remains highly concerned about the continuing restrictions on freedom of expression.

During the Ahmadinejad presidency between 2005 and 2013, Ahmadinejad was of the opinion that the Larijani brothers were corrupt. He asserted in 2013 that Mohammad-Javad Larijani had acquired his farm in Kordan almost for free by using his influence in the government. Larijani denied the assertion.

Larijani said that the 2009 Iranian presidential election protests constituted a coup against the Islamic system.

=== Academia ===
Larijani has been the director of the Institute for Studies in Theoretical Physics and Mathematics in Tehran. Previously, he was the director of the Majlis Research Center from 1995 to 2000.

== Views ==
=== View on Obama ===
In 2010 Larijani stated with regard to U.S. President Barack Obama that: "Since Obama came to office he spoke of dialogue with Iran, What has happened that this black 'nigger' is talking about regime change in Iran"?.

=== View on homosexuality ===
In 2012, he described homosexuality, which is illegal in Iran where it can be punishable by death, as immorality and a western “disease.”

=== View on dancing ===
In November 2014 he said that dancing and exhibiting happiness in public were against Islamic values.

=== View on capital punishment for narcotic offenses ===
Larijani praised the Iranian Judiciary in 2014 for capital punishment for narcotic offenses. He stated that the world should learn from Iran on this matter.

=== Women and the mandatory hijab ===
In response to the Mahsa Amini protests, after she died in police custody for allegedly not wearing her hijab in accordance with government standards, in 2022 Larijani said on Iranian broadcast Channel 3 (Iran) which has been translated by MEMRI,

"[Mahsa Amini] was detained by the police, and she was in a classroom when she suddenly collapsed. The police were enforcing the limitation on public nudity. You may call it 'hijab,' modesty, or whatever, but in all countries – without exception – there are limits on public nudity."

In 2023 he said that women who remove their hijabs are engaging in "sedition," which attracts punishments as harsh as the death sentence.

=== Iran's nuclear weapon capability ===
In November 2011, Larijani claimed that nuclear weapons violate Islam.

In contrast, in November 2024, he said that Iran can develop military nuclear capabilities within one day.

=== Threats ===
On a July 2025, interview on Iran's state television he said: “Europeans can no longer move about comfortably in their own countries. It’s entirely possible that in the near future, five drones could strike a European city.”

This followed a threat earlier in July against U.S. President Donald J. Trump in which he said: "Trump can no longer sunbathe in Mar-a-Lago, because while he's lying down, a micro-drone might target and strike him right in the navel,". Comedian Ronny Chieng joked: "Iran went from building a nuclear bomb to ‘We’re going to turn his outie into an innie.'"

=== High Council for Human Rights ===
The High Council for Human Rights is subjected to controversy. The council has a history of defending the government’s controversial human rights violating actions to outside bodies, rather than improving the human rights situation. According to Fars News Agency, in the "Human Rights and the New Challenges of the Islamic World" conference, Larijani pointed out the human rights challenges raised by the UN Commission on Human Rights against Iran. He said, "The origin of these challenges has a completely legal basis and is based on the international laws that we have signed, and the violator they have named is 80% related to the way the judiciary acts..." Larijani admits that Iran’s laws do not align with Article 18 of the Universal Declaration of Human Rights, particularly regarding religious freedom and the right to change or promote one’s religion. However Iran has its own legal and cultural framework that differs from Western or international norms. Larijani frames international criticism and sanctions not as legitimate enforcement of universal values, but as external pressure or punishment for Iran refusing to conform to those values.

"According to Article 18 of the Universal Declaration of Human Rights, everyone has the right to declare in private and in public that he has accepted a new religion and to propagate it, and should not be pressured for doing this. However, this is not in accordance with our laws. As a result, these countries are telling us, ‘You are not adhering to the Universal Declaration of Human Rights and you are inherently in violation.’ For this reason, they have considered punitive mechanisms, including all kinds of sanctions, for our country."

In March 2014, responding to international condemnation over the high rate of executions in Iran, Larijani argued "Unfortunately, international bodies, instead of praising Iran, have used the increase in the number of executions due to Iran's decisive action against drugs as a basis for human rights attacks on the Islamic Republic of Iran." Larijani characterized the extensive execution of individuals convicted of drug trafficking as "a great service to humanity". In addition, he defended the application of Qisas, stating: "It is clear that the criticisms against Iran in the name of human rights have no human rights basis. Their main goal in criticizing executions in Iran is Qisas, while Qisas is a right of the citizens and has nothing to do with the government or the judiciary. It embodies life, and the basis of Islam in Qisas is forgiveness and pardon".

In September 2016 he stated "The main points of attack [global objections to human rights violations in Iran] are the implementation of Sharia laws, the regime's handling of counter-revolutionary elements, the treatment of seditionists, the situation of Baha'is, the status of minorities, and finally the status of women."

== Published works ==
His 1996 book Naghde Din-dari va Modernism (Critique of Religiosity and Modernism) is a collection of his articles and essays focusing on the intersection of religious thought, political philosophy, and the challenges posed by modernity in the Iranian context. Larijani critiques certain traditionalist interpretations of religion, arguing for a more dynamic and rational understanding that can engage with the modern world.

He has also written a chapter "Mathematic Logic in Iran" for a book Logic in Tehran published by the Cambridge University Press in 2006.

== See also ==
- Fazel Larijani (brother)
- Sadegh Larijani (brother)
- Ali Larijani (brother)
- Bagher Larijani (brother)

Academic offices
New title Institution founded	President of the Institute for Research in Fundamental Sciences; 1989–present	Incumbent
New title Institution founded	President of the Majlis Research Center; 1995–2000	Succeeded by Mohammad Reza Khatami
