= Akbar Tabari =

Iranian politician (born 1961)

Akbar Atbai Tabari
- اکبر اتباعی طبری
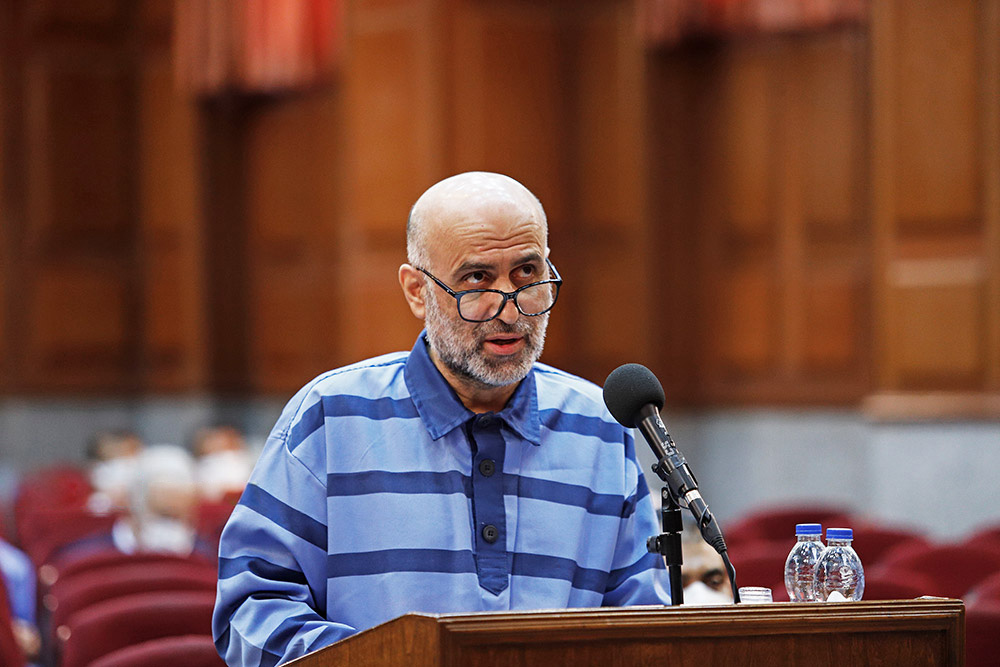
- Tabari in court, June 2020

Executive Deputy of the Judiciary
- In office 14 August 2009 – 7 March 2019
- Appointed by: Sadegh Larijani
- Preceded by: Mahmoud Hashemi Shahroudi
- Succeeded by: Ebrahim Raisi

Director General of Financial Affairs of the Judiciary
- In office 2007–2009
- Appointed by: Mahmoud Hashemi Shahroudi
- Supreme Leader: Ali Khamenei
- President: Mahmoud Ahmadinejad

Personal details
- Born: Akbar Atbai Tabari; 9 February 1961 (age 65) Babol, Mazandaran, Iran
- Party: Independent
- Other political affiliations: People's Mojahedin Organization of Iran
- Children: 2
- Education: Shahid Rajaee Teacher Training University

Military service
- Allegiance: Iran
- Branch/service: Army
- Years of service: 1983–1985

Personal life
- Main interest: Architecture
- Notable idea: Public management

Religious life
- Religion: Islam
- Denomination: Twelver Shi'a
- Jurisprudence: Ja'fari
- Creed: Usuli

Academic background
- Education: Shahid Rajaee Teacher Training University
- Thesis: Architecture

Academic work
- Discipline: Public management
- Sub-discipline: Architecture
- Institutions: Shahid Rajaee Teacher Training University

Akbar Atbai Tabari (Persian: اکبر اتباعی طبری), (born February 9, 1961) is an Iranian politician who served as Deputy Chief of the Judiciary of Iran and a senior financial and administrative official in 2009. He was also involved in leading several bribery and money laundering networks.

Akbar Tabari, who served as the Deputy Chief of Staff of the Judiciary during Sadeq Larijani's tenure and as the Deputy for Financial Affairs of the Judiciary during the era of Mahmoud Shahroudi.Tabari was the first official dismissed by Seyyed Ebrahim Raisi, the new head of the Judiciary, seven days after Raisi assumed office. He was detained by the IRGC in Amol on July 14, 2019.In the indictment, Tabari is identified as the primary defendant—Akbar Tabari, son of Ahmad, born in Babol, and a Shia Muslim.These allegations arise against the backdrop of the support Sadeq Larijani extended to Tabari throughout the twenty years the latter handled economic cases within the Judiciary; notably, in July 2019, Sadeq Amoli Larijani’s office announced that Larijani—who had headed the Judiciary—had independently examined the allegations against Akbar Tabari and had become convinced that they were unfounded.Mohammad-Ali Dadashi, Tabari’s former lawyer, commented on the case: "I told the man—who could have faced the death penalty but initially received a 31-year prison sentence and has now been released—that he ought to be grateful to his lawyer; however, Tabari replied that his case was not something a lawyer could resolve, stating instead that interventions by officials—such as Ayatollah Sadeq Larijani—and the money spent by Rasoul Danialzadeh were what solved his problem."On June 17, 2020, Gholamhossein Mohseni-Ejei made a controversial claim, stating: "It was not established to either me or the former head of the Judiciary (Sadeq Larijani) that Akbar Tabari was a wrongdoer!"Judge Gholamreza Mansouri is the ninth defendant in the judicial case of Akbar Tabari. Mansouri, who had fled the country, was accused of accepting bribes totaling over 500,000 euros; he was absent during the trial, having escaped to Germany. Tabari served as the Director General of Financial Affairs for the Judiciary during Mahmoud Hashemi Shahroudi’s tenure as head of the institution; under Sadeq Larijani, he retained this role while also being appointed as the Executive Deputy to the Head of the Judiciary. Mansouri was also a senior judicial official during Larijani’s tenure. On June 19, 2020, Gholamreza Mansouri fell—or was thrown—from the fourth floor of the hotel where he was staying in Romania and died. According to Romanian police reports, the incident was highly suspicious, raising the possibility of a premeditated killing.

== Early life and education ==
Akbar Tabari was born on February 9, 1961, in Babol, Iran, to Iranian parents of Mazandaran origin. He came from a religious Shia family living in Mati Kola, a village in Mazandaran Province, northern Iran.

Tabari is a graduate of engineering. He also holds a bachelor's degree in architecture from Shahid Rajaee University of Tehran.

== Career ==
Tabari was the Director General of Finance and the Deputy Chief of the Judiciary of the Islamic Republic of Iran, serving as the head of the Judiciary during the presidency of Seyyed Mahmoud Hashemi Shahroudi and Sadegh Larijani, respectively. He was also a member of the Board of Directors of the Kung Fu and Martial Arts Federation. Mr. Tabari, a native of the village of Matikala in Babol County, specialized in construction and civil engineering projects. The Executive Deputy Office of the Judiciary Chief’s headquarters oversaw a vast array of service, medical, recreational, and administrative facilities. These included a highly specialized dental center and recreational complexes such as "Dasht-e Behesht" and "Beheshti" in Tehran, "Khazar-Abad" in Sari, the "Sareyn" hydrotherapy center, "Milad" and "Edalat" in Mashhad, "Masoumeh" in Qom, and the "Kapourchal" complex.

These recreational complexes—including the "Milad" project in Mashhad, a massive undertaking featuring one 23-story tower and two 10-story towers—were constructed during Tabari’s tenure. Collectively, these projects and construction activities transformed the Executive Deputy Office under Sadeq Larijani into a major construction enterprise over the years. Furthermore, this office was responsible for organizing tenders for Judiciary construction projects. The construction of 14 judicial complexes in Tehran in 2015 and the 165-bed hospital for the Judiciary headquarters were among the projects carried out under Tabari’s supervision.

In addition to Tabari, the Judiciary hospital project involved Bagher Larijani (Sadeq Larijani’s brother) and Marzieh Vahid-Dastjerdi (Sadeq Larijani’s advisor)—figures who constituted the Judiciary Chief’s inner circle of trust.

The issue of Judiciary construction projects has gained significance following a tweet by Mahmoud Sadeghi, a Member of Parliament representing Tehran. According to Mr. Sadeghi, Akbar Tabari had access to Judiciary accounts holding public funds held in trust and misappropriated them. Mr. Sadeghi is referring to the Judiciary’s well-known 63 accounts—originally held in the name of the head of the Judiciary himself—which were reduced to five accounts during Raisi’s tenure.

Officials from Larijani’s tenure stated that these accounts were used for the construction of certain judicial facilities—areas that fell under the control and specific interest of Akbar Tabari.

== Arrest ==
Tabari was arrested by the IRGC Intelligence Organization in Amol on July 13, 2019. Tabari is named as a first-degree defendant in the indictment. In July 2019, there was a debate about corruption in the judiciary. Sadegh Larijani had supported Tabari during his 20 years in the judiciary, when he was the Director General of Financial Affairs and the Executive Deputy of the Judiciary of the Islamic Republic and was accused of several counts of bribery. On the same date, Sadegh Larijani’s office announced that “some of the accusations made against the Executive Deputy of the Presidency had previously been investigated by the Prosecutor’s Office and were proven false,” and that Larijani, who was the head of the Judiciary, had independently investigated the accusations and “they were proven to be false.”

== accuseds ==
- Bijan Ghasemzadeh: Convicted on charges of "exerting the influence of government officials on proceedings" and "accepting bribes."
- Rasoul Danialzadeh: Known as the "Steel Tycoon," he is accused of bribing Tabari in one of the cases against him. Recognized as a "mega-debtor" with 4,000 billion [tomans] in bank debt, he had fled the country but was arrested and extradited to Iran in November 2019.
- Mostafa Niaz-Azari: His name initially appeared in the case involving Bijan Ghasemzadeh. He gained greater prominence as the second defendant in the financial corruption trial of Akbar Tabari. His father, Kiumars Niaz-Azari, served as the Director General of the Mazandaran Intelligence Department for 22 years and as the President of Islamic Azad University, Sari Branch, for 12 years; he was dismissed from his post and expelled from the university by order of Tehrani. A large portion of the highland areas in the Bandpey-ye Sharqi District of Babol County and the Lafur Rural District of Savadkuh-e Shomali County belongs to the Niaz-Azari family (one of the influential clans of the Bandpey region in Babol). He orchestrated the outflow of foreign currency from the country by establishing ten shell companies—both domestically and abroad—leveraging influence within the judicial and banking sectors, and engaging in the fabrication of invoices and fictitious orders. On January 17, 2012 (Dey 27, 1390), Mostafa Niaz-Azari was arrested on charges of disrupting the country's economic system; however, despite his explicit confession, the intervention and influence of Akbar Tabari led to his acquittal on certain charges, while proceedings regarding other charges were left unresolved. The prosecutor's representative stated regarding this matter: Mostafa Niaz-Azari's escape was facilitated by a bribe he paid to Akbar Tabari—specifically, approximately 15,000 square meters of land and a three-story luxury villa in Babolsar valued at 420 billion Rials. The gifting of a villa of such value was in exchange for Tabari's intervention in his legal case; furthermore, efforts were made to execute the transfer documents under a cover that concealed the names of both Mostafa Niaz-Azari and Akbar Tabari. Instead, the property was transferred—via an intermediary, Bahram Heydari-Far—to Akbar Tabari’s wife; this transaction was executed through collusion with a Tehran notary public and the use of a forged power of attorney, with Akbar Tabari himself affixing the fingerprint in place of his wife. The villa was constructed based on Akbar Tabari’s specifications and funded by Mostafa Niaz-Azari. To avoid being recognized by the caretaker during his visits to the villa, Tabari would identify himself as "Hossein." Mostafa Niaz-Azari is currently the fifth defendant in the Tabari case; he fled the country following the initial arrests and is charged with participating in the formation of a bribery network and paying bribes to Akbar Tabari in the form of five plots of land in Babolsar.
- Mohammad Anousheh, fugitive
- Hassan Najafi, fugitive
- Hossein Shafiei is charged with participating in the formation of a bribery network; acquiring assets valued at over 60 billion [Rials] in cash, five plots of land in the "Bayseti Hills" area of Lavasan, and a plot on Sanaei Street; converting 23 billion Rials into airline company shares; money laundering involving two units in the Atlantis building; facilitating bribery between Akbar Tabari and Rasoul Danial-Zadeh; money laundering and facilitating bribery involving Gholamreza Mansouri, Hassan Najafi, and Tabari; and money laundering regarding two apartment units in the Atlantis Tower. Farhad Mashayekh is accused of participating in the formation of a bribery network; acquiring assets valued at over 80 billion [Rials] in cash, a plot of land in Najjar-Kola, Lavasan, and a plot in Karim Khan; converting 42 billion Rials into cement company shares; money laundering involving two units in the Roma building; facilitating bribery between Akbar Tabari and Rasoul Danialzadeh; money laundering and facilitating bribery between Gholamreza Mansouri and Hassan Najafi; and money laundering regarding two apartment units in the Roma building.
- Jalil Sobhani, CEO of SPEK Company and major shareholder of Hovayar Company; paying a bribe of 100,000 Euros
- Hassan Najafi, fugitive economic offender
- Seyyed Hadi Razavi; obtaining promises and commitments regarding the case
- Ali Divandari; exerting influence in... Case involving Tabari:
1. Alireza Mehrsadeghi, founder and CEO of Havayar Company: Facilitating bribery between Rasoul Danialzadeh and Akbar Tabari, and money laundering.
- Hamidreza Ghorbani: Leveraging Akbar Tabari’s influence on judicial decisions in Branch 15 (Government Employees' Court).
- Vorya Molanaei: Leveraging the influence of government officials in this case.
- Hossein Hajizadeh: Leveraging Tabari’s influence in the case.
- Amir-Abbas Mosaddegh Khaghan (Official Court Expert): Forgery of an official document / Aiding and abetting a crime.
- Mehdi Zahedian (Attorney): Facilitating the crime of bribery through negotiations and financial dealings between Danialzadeh and Morteza Alizadeh.
- Farhad Pour: Facilitating the commission of the crime involving Tabari as the principal perpetrator.
- Javad Torkaman: Aiding and abetting the offense; soliciting and accepting benefits by claiming influence and connections with government officials.
- Ali Sadeghi: Aiding and abetting the offense of soliciting and accepting benefits by claiming influence with certain government officials.
- Ali Tanpoushan, Legal Manager Havayar Company: facilitating bribery between Tabari and Sobhani
- Bahram Heydari-Fard (attorney): facilitating the commission of bribery between Mr. Tabari and Niaz-Azari
- Mohammad Honarvar: forgery of official documents by registering a deed in the name of Akbar Tabari’s spouse
- Hossein Haj-Reza: complicity in paying a bribe of 28 billion Rials to Ghasemzadeh
- Nader Sharif-Najjar (fugitive): complicity in paying a bribe of 28 billion Rials to Mr. Bijan Ghasemzadeh
- The case of Davoudi Sarkhosh Shahri and others: Tabari’s influence peddling
- "Hosseini": an alias used by Tabari in certain transactions

These are just some of the names mentioned in this case. Over the course of 30 complaints filed in this case, 61 individuals were arrested; some of them are currently released on bail.

== Trial and imprisonment ==
On June 8, 2020, the first trial of Tabari and several other defendants in collaboration with him, including Bijan Ghasemzadeh (a former media prosecutor who had issued the Telegram filter order and sentences against Amir Hossein Maghsoudloo, known as Tatalo in Iran), was held, during which the prosecutor's representative accused the defendants of "forming a network of several people in bribery."

Trial Akbar Tabari

On September 12, 2020, Tabari was sentenced to 31 years in prison for “leading” a bribery network and “taking multiple bribes.” He was sentenced to 12.5 years in prison for money laundering. He was also sentenced to “permanent dismissal from government service,” “seizure of assets resulting from taking bribes,” and a fine of 120 billion tomans. Tabari was released from prison on bail of 300 billion tomans. Mohammad Ali Dadashi, Tabari’s former lawyer, said about Tabari’s case: “They told a person who could have received the death penalty but was initially imprisoned for 31 years and has now been released, that you should be grateful to your lawyer, but Tabari said that my case was not something a lawyer could solve; the advice of officials, such as Ayatollah Sadegh Larijani, and the money that Rasoul Danialzadeh spent, solved my problem.

== Death of daughter ==
The body of Tabari's daughter, Samaneh Atbai Tabari, an anesthesiologist, was found in a villa in Lavasan in August 2026. Unofficial sources claim that she had been hanged there. Unofficial reports say that the location where the body was discovered was not a place she usually frequented. The only public comment on the matter was made by Farhad Teymurzadeh, her physician and colleague. In a message on social media, Timurzadeh wrote: "I think this incident once again showed the weakness of psychological support and the ineffective ways in which universities and families approach these issues, where censorship and deletion have replaced finding the cause.

Political offices
Preceded by Deputy	Executive Deputy of the Judiciary and Director General of Financial Affairs of the Judiciary	Succeeded by Sadegh Larijani (acting)
