= Sadiq Larijani =

Iranian cleric and politician (born 1963)

Ayatollah Sadiq Larijani
- صادق لاریجانی
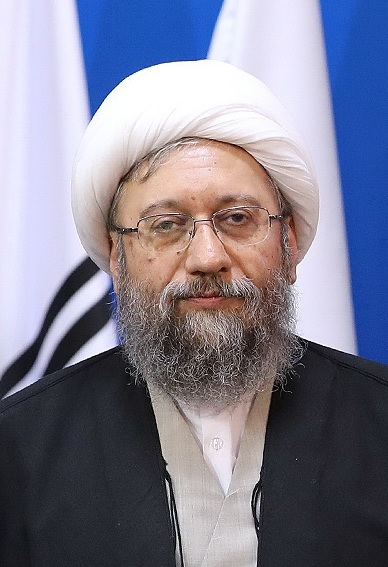
- Larijani in 2017

4th Chairman of the Expediency Discernment Council
- Incumbent
- Assumed office 30 December 2018
- Appointed by: Ali Khamenei
- Preceded by: Mahmoud Hashemi Shahroudi

6th Chief Justice of Iran
- In office 14 August 2009 – 7 March 2019
- Appointed by: Ali Khamenei
- Deputy: Akbar Tabari; Ebrahim Raisi; Gholam-Hossein Mohseni-Eje'i
- Preceded by: Mahmoud Hashemi Shahroudi
- Succeeded by: Ebrahim Raisi

Member of the Assembly of Experts
- In office 23 February 1999 – 20 May 2024
- Constituency: Mazandaran Province
- Majority: 682,817

Personal details
- Born: Sadiq Ardashir Larijani; 12 March 1961 (age 65) Najaf, Najaf Governorate, First Iraqi Republic
- Party: Society of Seminary Teachers of Qom
- Parent: Mirza Hashem Amoli (father)
- Relatives: Ali Larijani (brother); Mohammad-Javad Larijani (brother); Fazel Larijani (brother); Bagher Larijani (brother); Abdollah Javadi-Amoli (uncle); Ahmad Tavakoli (cousin); Hossein Wahid Khorasani (father-in-law)
- Education: Qom Seminary

Religious life
- Religion: Islam
- Denomination: Shia
- School: Twelver

Sadiq Ardashir Larijani (Note: Persian: صادق اردشیر لاریجانی) (born 12 March 1961) is an Iranian cleric and politician who currently serves as the chairman of Expediency Discernment Council since 2018. He previously served as the sixth chief justice of Iran from 2009 to 2019.

Born in Najaf, Iraq, to the Larijani family, Sadiq Larijani began his seminary studies in Qom. He then served as one of the 12 members of the Guardian Council of the Islamic Republic of Iran for eight years. He was appointed head of the judicial system of Iran by supreme leader Ali Khamenei in 2009.

Larijani was one of the closest aides of Supreme Leader Ali Khamenei and was regarded by many commentators as one of the potential successors to Khamenei, along with the latter's son Mojtaba Khamenei, who did succeed his father.

== Early life and education ==
Sadiq Ardashir Larijani was born on 12 March 1961 in Najaf, Iraq, to an Iranian family originating from Larijan, Iran. The family is reported to belong to the Mazani ethnic group. His father, Hashim Larijani, was a high-ranking Shia Islamic scholar and was bestowed the title Grand Ayatollah. Larijani had moved to Najaf after reportedly being exiled by Mohammad Reza Pahlavi, the shah of Iran.

Larijani became familiar with both religious sciences and modern sciences as a child. He began primary school in 1346 Solar (1966) and finished high school in 1360 Solar (1981). After high school, he began his seminary studies in Qom. He finished his seminary studies in 1368 Solar (1989) and then began to teach in both seminary and university. He became a member of scientific staffs of Qom University and taught many courses in theology and comparative philosophy. Larijani is a brother of Ali Larijani (Speaker of the previous Majlis), Mohammad Javad Larijani, Bagher Larijani (Chancellor of Tehran University of Medical Sciences), and Fazel Larijani (Iran's former cultural attaché in Ottawa).

== Career ==
Larijani served as one of the 12 members of the Guardian Council of the Islamic Republic of Iran for eight years. Described as "relatively junior" or "inexperienced cleric" with "close ties to Iran's military and intelligence agencies", he was appointed head of the judicial system of Iran by supreme leader Ali Khamenei on 14 August 2009.

According to leading Iranian human rights defense lawyer Mohammad Seifzadeh, the head of the Judicial System of Iran is required to be a Mojtahed with significant experience in the field. Larijani, however, was neither an experienced jurist nor a highly ranked cleric and carried the title of Hojjat-ol Eslam up to a few months before his appointment to the post. Larijani's tenure as the Chief Justice of Iran was prematurely and abruptly ended on 7 March 2019, at the same time as the publicizing of a high-profile corruption case involving one of his deputies. Supreme Leader Ali Khamenei appointed Ebrahim Raisi to succeed him. Larijani was also ousted from the Guardian council.

=== Activities ===
Shortly after his appointment, Larijani appointed Saeed Mortazavi to the post of the deputy prosecutor general of Iran. Mortazavi was prosecutor general of Tehran for more than seven years, during which he was involved in murdering and torturing several Iranian civilians and activists. One of the high-profile deaths attributed to Mortazavi is that of Canadian-Iranian photojournalist Zahra Kazemi. On 7 September 2009, Iranian police, with permission from the judiciary system and Tehran General Court, entered the office to support political prisoners and seized all the documents and computers, among others. The police refused to give a receipt for the items. Mehdi Karroubi and Mir Hossein Mousavi organized the office to support the victims of torture in Iranian prisons. On 8 September 2009, Iranian Judiciary, unexpectedly closed and sealed the office of National Confidence Party and arrested Morteza Alviri and Alireza Beheshti and several of the closest allies of opposition leaders Mehdi Karroubi and Mir Hossein Mousavi. That same month, the authorities from the Judiciary System began targeting the children of leaders of the opposition groups. For instance, Atefeh Emam, the daughter of jailed activist Javad Emam, the Chief of Staff of Mousavi's campaign, was arrested on 9 September 2009, held in a secret facility, and tortured to pressure her to make a "confession" implicating her father. The Judiciary released her after twenty-four hours in the South of Tehran in an inappropriate condition.

== Controversies ==
Larijani's term as a Chief Justice was rife with brutality and human rights abuses, such as in the suppression of the 2009 protests, when he oversaw "the execution of individuals who were juveniles at the time of their crime and the torture or cruel, inhumane, and degrading treatment or punishment of prisoners in Iran, including amputations." According to some, over 100 activists were killed in this context. Under Larijani the Judiciary persecuted family members of activists such as in the case of Atefeh Emam, the daughter of Mousavi's chief of staff.

In 2013, President Ahmedinejad said that he obtained a recording between Larijani's brother and the former prosecutor general of Tehran, Saeed Mortazavi, which allegedly proved that the Larijani family took advantage of their positions for personal gain.

In 2015, he said it is illegal for the Assembly of Experts to supervise Supreme Leader Ali Khamenei. In 2016, he warned president Hassan Rouhani against voicing opposition to Supreme Leader Ali Khamenei, during that same year Larijani was criticized for owning dozens of bank accounts and was accused by parliament member Mahmoud Sadeghi of "funneling bail money into his personal account". Rouhani accused Larijani of corruption, and it was suspected that he abused his position to amassed a sum of $77 million, while Mike Pompeo had alleged that his wealth exceeded the sum of $300 million. In 2019, Larijani was publicly criticized by Mohammad Yazdi, the head of the Qom's Instructors Association, for setting up a luxurious office in the religious city of Qom.

== Views ==
Sadiq Larijani stated that the government does not derive legitimacy from the nation's votes. He is a well-known critic of ex-president Mohammad Khatami and his reforms. In March 1998, an article by him attacking Khatami's call for an Islamic civil society and Abdolkarim Soroush's philosophy was published in Sobh newspaper.

Larijani proclaimed:

"We support a society which is based on the spirit of Islam and religious faith, in which Islamic and religious values are propagated, in which every Koranic injunction and the teachings of the Prophet of Islam and the Imams are implemented. It will be a society in which the feeling of servitude to God Almighty will be manifest everywhere, and in which people will not demand their rights from God but are conscious of their obligations to God."

At the same time, he was considered a leading figure in the sphere of philosophy of law or fiqh. He also criticizes the views of people – such as Abdolkarim Soroush – who say that while there is a society, or civilization, of Muslims, there is no such thing as an Islamic society or civilization and that Islam is a spiritual and individual way of life, not an ideology. Larijani condemned protesters and those who expressed doubts in the 2009 presidential election results, calling the protests "illegal" and any doubts "baseless".

== Sanctions ==
On 23 May 2012, Larijani was put on the sanction list of the European Union, which was published in the Official Journal of the Union. In the journal, it was stated that as head of the judiciary in Iran, he endorsed and allowed harsh punishments for retribution crimes, crimes against God, and crimes against the state.

In January 2018, the United States sanctioned Larijani for human rights abuses, which Iran strongly denied.

== Candidacy for Supreme Leadership ==
During the years prior to the assassination of supreme leader Ali Khamenei on 28 February 2026, during the 2026 Israeli–United States strikes on Iran, Larijani was named as a possible successor to Ali Khamenei as Supreme Leader.

== Works ==
Ayatollah Sadiq Larijani wrote works in a variety of different fields such as Islamic jurisprudence (fiqh), principles of Islamic jurisprudence (Uṣūl al-fiqh), analytic philosophy, philosophy of language, and moral philosophy. He translated some works into Persian, notably Geoffrey Warnock's Contemporary Moral Philosophy. He also translated a philosophy of science article by Karl Popper. In several works, he criticizes the Western point of view from an Islamic viewpoint. In May 2016, The collection of philosophy of principles was represented by him. This collection amounts to 33 volumes; until now, just the first and fifth volumes have been published.

Some of the books written by him are as follows:

- Critics on Theory of Theoretical Limitation and Expansion of Shariah
- Analytical Philosophy, Designation and Necessity
- Theories of Meaning

== Public image ==
According to a poll conducted in March 2016 by Information and Public Opinion Solutions LLC (iPOS) among Iranian citizens, Larijani has 37% approval and 29% disapproval ratings and thus a +8% net popularity; while 23% of responders do not recognize the name.

== Personal life ==
Larijani is the son-in-law of Grand Ayatollah Hossein Wahid Khorasani, who was one of his teachers in Qom. Larijani's uncles include Abdollah Javadi-Amoli. Ahmad Tavakoli is among the cousins of Larijani.

== See also ==
- List of Iranian officials

== Notes ==
Legal offices
Preceded by Mahmoud Hashemi Shahroudi	Chief Justice of Iran; 2009–2019	Succeeded by Ebrahim Raisi
