= Ali Larijani =

Iranian politician and military officer (1958–2026)

Sardar Ali Larijani
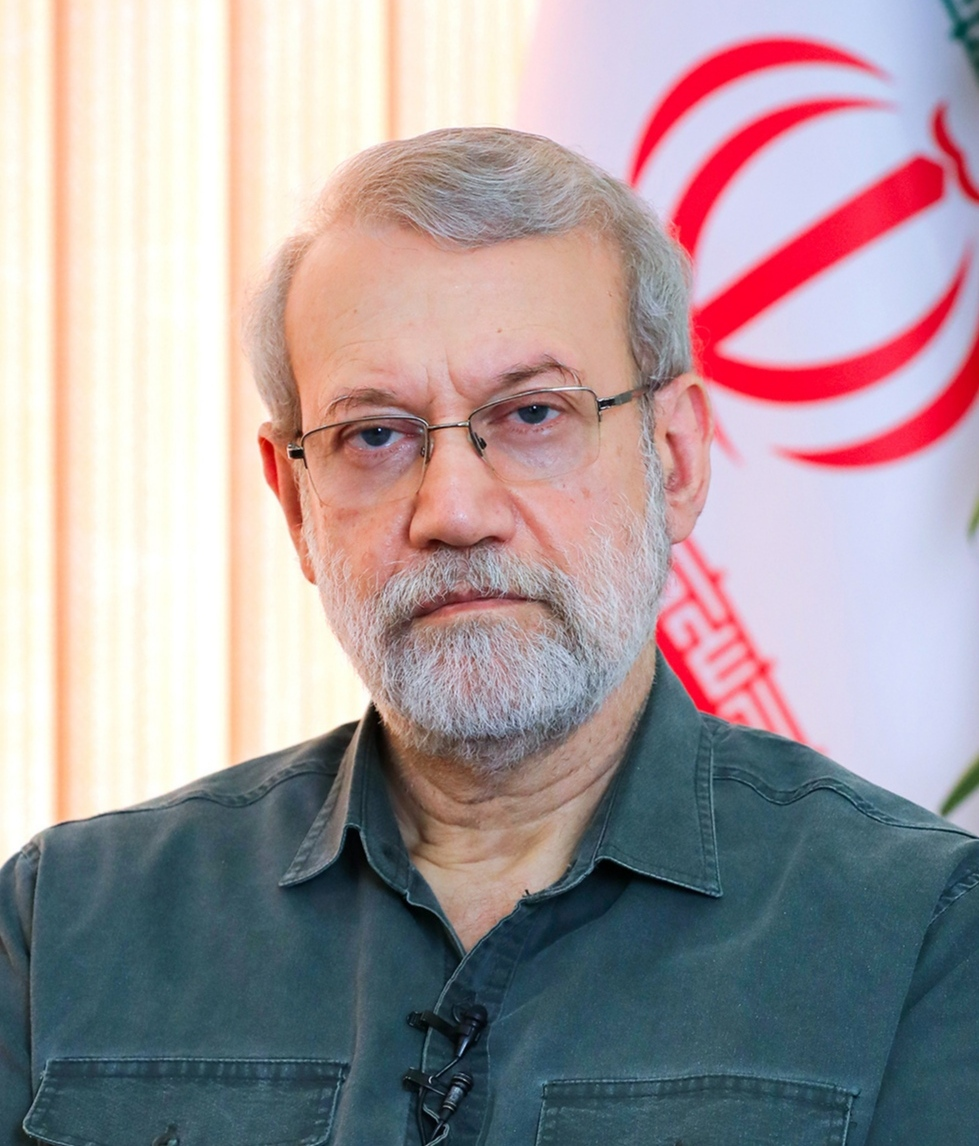
- Larijani in 2025

2nd and 6th Secretary of the Supreme National Security Council
- In office 5 August 2025 – 17 March 2026
- President: Masoud Pezeshkian
- Supreme Leader: Ali Khamenei; Mojtaba Khamenei
- Preceded by: Ali Akbar Ahmadian
- Succeeded by: Mohammad Bagher Zolghadr
- In office 15 August 2005 – 20 October 2007
- President: Mahmoud Ahmadinejad
- Deputy: Abdolreza Rahmani Fazli
- Supreme Leader: Ali Khamenei
- Preceded by: Hassan Rouhani
- Succeeded by: Saeed Jalili

5th Speaker of the Islamic Consultative Assembly
- In office 28 May 2008 (Note: Acting: 28 May – 4 June 2008; 28–31 May 2012; 29–30 May 2016) – 28 May 2020
- President: Mahmoud Ahmadinejad; Hassan Rouhani
- Deputy: Mohammad-Reza Bahonar; Mohammad-Hassan Aboutorabi Fard; Masoud Pezeshkian
- Supreme Leader: Ali Khamenei
- Preceded by: Gholam-Ali Haddad-Adel
- Succeeded by: Mohammad Bagher Ghalibaf
Other posts held
Member of Expediency Discernment Council
In office 28 May 2020 – 17 March 2026
| Appointed by | Ali Khamenei |
| Chairman | Sadiq Larijani |
| Preceded by | Mohammad Bagher Ghalibaf |
In office 17 March 1997 – 2008
| Appointed by | Ali Khamenei |
| Chairman | Akbar Hashemi Rafsanjani |
Member of the Islamic Consultative Assembly
In office 28 May 2008 – 28 May 2020
| Constituency | Qom |
Head of Islamic Republic of Iran Broadcasting
In office 13 February 1994 – 23 May 2004
| Appointed by | Ali Khamenei |
| Preceded by | Mohammad Hashemi Rafsanjani |
| Succeeded by | Ezzatollah Zarghami |
In office 14 February 1981 – July 1981
| Appointed by | Supervisory council |
| Preceded by | Ali Akbar Mohtashamipour and Abdollah Nouri (Co-caretakers) |
| Succeeded by | Mohammad Hashemi Rafsanjani |
Minister of Culture and Islamic Guidance
In office 16 July 1992 (Note: Acting: 16 July–11 August 1992) – 15 February 1994
| President | Akbar Hashemi Rafsanjani |
| Supreme Leader | Ali Khamenei |
| Preceded by | Mohammad Khatami |
| Succeeded by | Mostafa Mir-Salim |
Deputy Chief of Joint Staff of the IRGC
In office 1989–1992
| President | Akbar Hashemi Rafsanjani |
| Supreme Leader | Ali Khamenei |
| Preceded by | Abbas Mohtaj |
| Succeeded by | Hossein Dehghan |

Personal details
- Born: Ali Ardashir Larijani; 3 June 1958 Najaf, Iraq
- Died: 17 March 2026 (aged 67) Tehran, Iran
- Cause of death: Assassination by airstrike
- Resting place: Fatima Masumeh Shrine, Qom
- Party: Islamic Coalition Party (1990–2026)
- Other political affiliations: Electoral lists: Principlists Pervasive Coalition (2008); United Front of Principlists (2008, 2012); List of Hope (2016); Parliamentary groups: Principlists (2008–12); Followers of Wilayat (2012–16); Wilayi Independents (2016–20)
- Spouse: Farideh Motahhari
- Children: 4
- Parent: Hashim Larijani (father)
- Relatives: Larijani family
- Education: Sharif University of Technology (BSc); University of Tehran (MSc, PhD)
- Website: Official website

Military service
- Allegiance: Iran
- Branch/service: IRGC
- Years of service: 1981–1993
- Rank: Brigadier General
- Battles/wars: Iran–Iraq War; 2026 Iran war X

Academic background
- Thesis: Kant's Philosophy of Mathematics (1995)
- Doctoral advisor: Gholam-Ali Haddad-Adel
- Other advisor: Karim Mojtahedi
- Influences: Immanuel Kant; Saul Kripke; David Lewis

Academic work
- Discipline: Philosophy
- Institutions: University of Tehran

Ali Ardashir Larijani (Note: Persian: علی اردشیر لاریجانی, Persian pronunciation: [æliː-e lɒːɾiːdʒɒːniː]; Mazanderani: علی اردشیر لاریجانی, romanized: ʿAlī Ardashīr Lārījānī) (3 June 1958 – 17 March 2026) was an Iranian politician, military officer, and philosopher who served as the secretary of the Supreme National Security Council from 2025 until his assassination in 2026. He had previously served in the position from 2005 to 2007. From late December 2025 until his assassination, he was widely considered to be one of the most powerful officials in the Iranian government.

Born in Najaf, Iraq, to the ethnic Mazanderani-origin Larijani family, he studied Western philosophy at the University of Tehran. He rose to prominence within the Islamic Republic after joining the Islamic Revolutionary Guard Corps (IRGC) in 1981. He served as the speaker of the Parliament of Iran from 2008 to 2020. He was a member of the Expediency Discernment Council from 2020 until his death, having previously served from 1997 to 2008. He filed for candidacy in the 2024 presidential election, but was ultimately disqualified. He previously ran in 2005, but finished in sixth place, and was also disqualified from running in 2021.

Larijani was one of the two representatives of the Supreme Leader Ali Khamenei to the council, the other being Hassan Rouhani. In his post as secretary, he functioned as the top negotiator on issues of national security, including the nuclear program of Iran. He was also a member of the Supreme Council of the Cultural Revolution.

From c. 28 December 2025 until 17 March 2026, Larijani was described as the country's most powerful man by multiple newspapers like Haaretz, or as "de facto leader" by The Australian and others. Reportedly the IRGC supported him. On 15 January 2026, following a wave of protests and the ensuing massacres, the United States imposed new sanctions on Larijani for his part in repressing protesters. He was described as the "mastermind" of the January 2026 crackdown, leveraging his close ties to IRGC commanders and intelligence services, together with his family's longstanding connections to senior clerics, to consolidate support across rival factions and prepare to assume leadership after Khamenei's death. On 17 March 2026, Larijani was assassinated in an Israeli airstrike.

== Early life and education ==
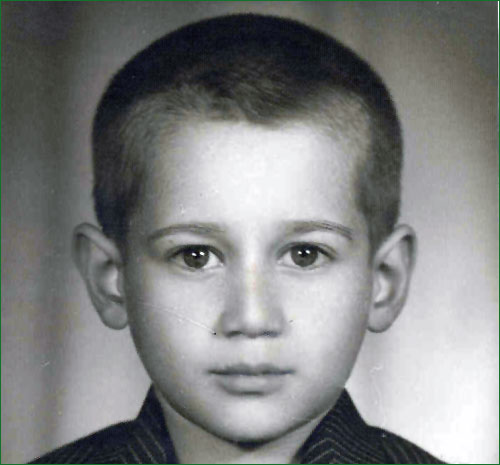
Larijani as a child, 1965

Ali Larijani was born on 3 June 1958 in Najaf, Iraq, to Iranian parents of ethnic Mazanderani background. He hailed from a religious Shia gentry family based in Amol, a city in the Mazandaran Province, located in northern Iran. His father was a leading Twelver Shia cleric, Hashim Larijani. His parents moved to Najaf in 1931 due to pressure of the ruler Reza Shah, but returned to Iran in 1961. During the later years of Reza Shah's reign, members of the Larijani family, including Hashim Larijani, were exiled to the Kurdish-inhabited cities of Bukan and Sardasht in northwestern Iran, where they resided for a time before eventually being allowed to return to northern Iran.

Larijani was a graduate of the Qom Seminary. He also held a Bachelor of Science degree in computer science and mathematics from Aryamehr University of Technology and held a master's degree and PhD in Western philosophy from the University of Tehran. Initially, he wanted to continue his graduate studies in computer science, but changed his subject after consultation with Morteza Motahhari, his future father-in-law. Larijani published books on Immanuel Kant, Saul Kripke, and David Lewis. Larijani was a faculty member of the School of Literature and Humanities at the University of Tehran.

== Political career (1981–2026) ==
Larijani was a commander of the Iranian Revolutionary Guards (IRGC) as well as a veteran of the Iran–Iraq War (1980–1988). He served as the deputy minister of labor and social affairs. Later he was appointed deputy minister of information and communications technology. In March 1994, he was appointed head of the Islamic Republic of Iran Broadcasting (IRIB), replacing Mohammad Hashemi Rafsanjani in the post. He was in office until 21 July 2004 and was succeeded by Ezzatollah Zarghami after serving ten years in the post. He became security adviser to Supreme Leader Ayatollah Ali Khamenei in August 2004.

Larijani was a presidential candidate for the 2005 presidential elections, where he ranked sixth, winning 5.94% of the votes. He was considered the most important presidential candidate of the conservative alliance for the 2005 presidential elections. He was supported by the Islamic Society of Engineers (ISE), among other conservative groups. He was the final choice of the conservative Council for Coordination of the Forces of the Revolution, made up from representatives of some influential conservative parties and organizations. However, he proved to be the least popular of the three conservative candidates, the others being Mahmoud Ahmadinejad (second rank in the first round, winner in the second round) and Mohammad Bagher Ghalibaf (fourth rank in the first round).

In 2005, Larijani was appointed the Supreme National Security Council secretary. This body helps draw up nuclear and other policies issued by the supreme leader. He replaced Hassan Rouhani in the post. As a chief nuclear negotiator, Iranian analysts said he differed with the president over how to pursue negotiations with his European counterparts and say he backed a more pragmatic approach.

As Iran's top nuclear envoy, Larijani said on 25 April 2007 that he expected "new ideas" from senior EU official Javier Solana at talks on resolving the deadlock between Tehran's refusal to freeze its nuclear programme and United Nations Security Council demands that it do so.

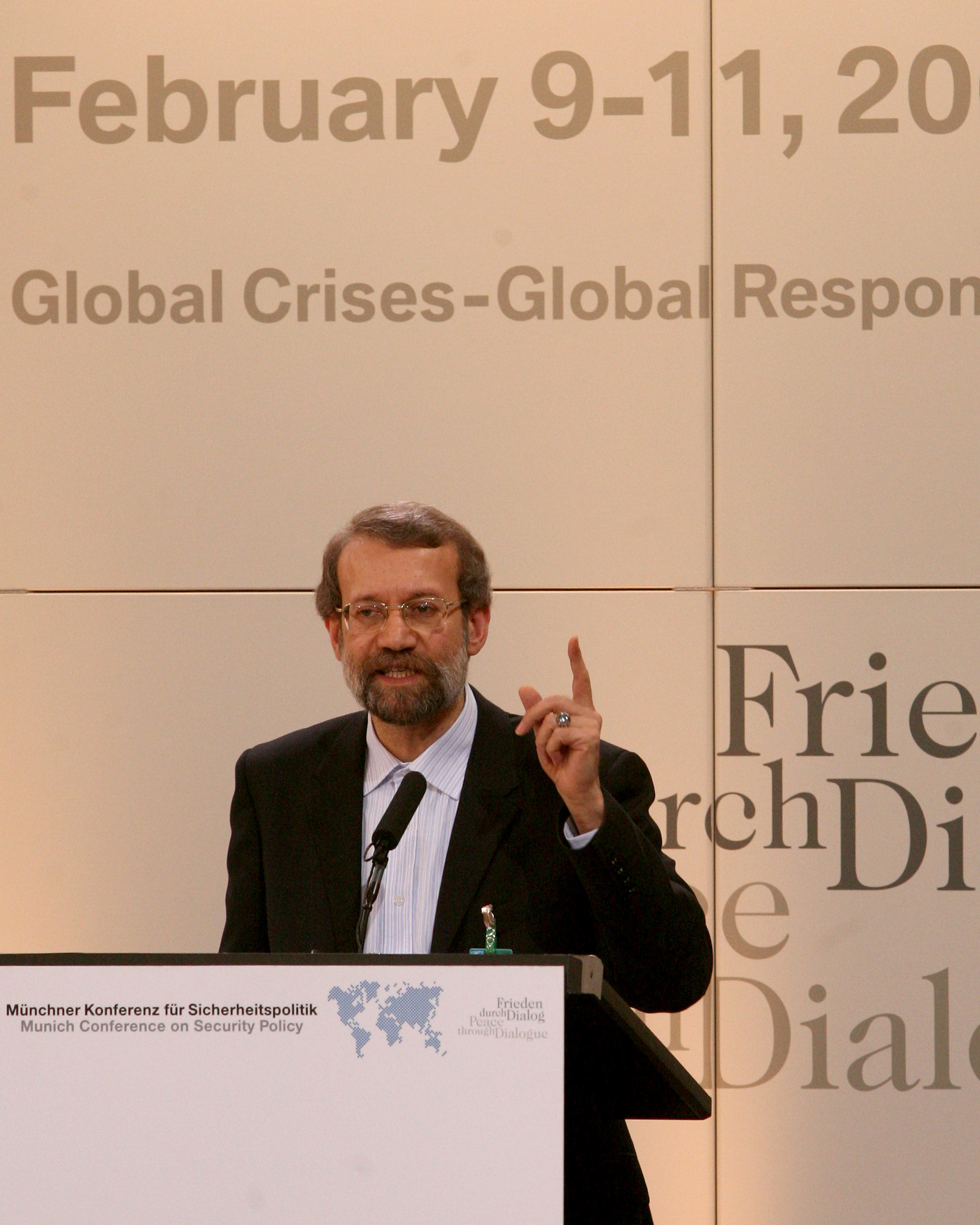
Larijani at Munich Security Conference, Germany, 2007

Larijani was the secretary of the Supreme National Security Council from 15 August 2005 to 20 October 2007, replacing Hassan Rouhani; he was appointed to the position by President Mahmoud Ahmadinejad. Larijani's resignation from the secretary position was accepted on 20 October 2007; President Ahmadinejad had turned down his previous resignations.

In the March 2008 parliamentary election, Larijani won a seat from Qom. He said he was willing to work with Ahmadinejad; according to Larijani, he did not disagree with Ahmadinejad on ideological issues and had only "differences in style". In May 2008, Larijani became speaker of the parliament. He was reelected in the next year as chairman of the parliament. He was re-elected in the 2012 election, receiving the highest vote of any candidate in the Qom district. He was also elected for another term as chairman of the parliament on 5 June 2012 and was sworn in on 11 June 2012.

Larijani implied on 21 June 2009 that authorities took the side of one candidate without clarifying which candidate. Just after the election, Larijani reportedly congratulated presidential candidate Mir Hossein Mousavi as he, having "access to firsthand and classified information and news", believed Mousavi had won the election. However, on 22 October 2012, during a Q and A meeting with the students of Iran University of Science and Technology, Larijani denied the allegations that he had congratulated Mousavi. He was elected as speaker in the new Majlis in May 2016.

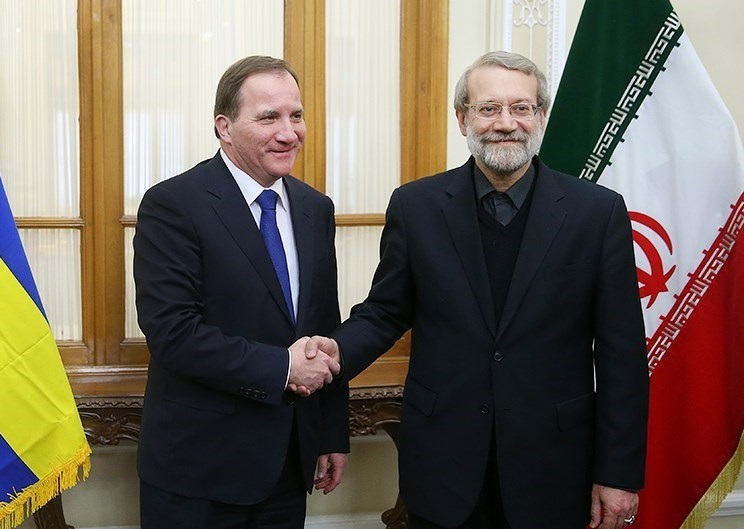
Larijani meeting with Swedish prime minister Stefan Löfven, 2017

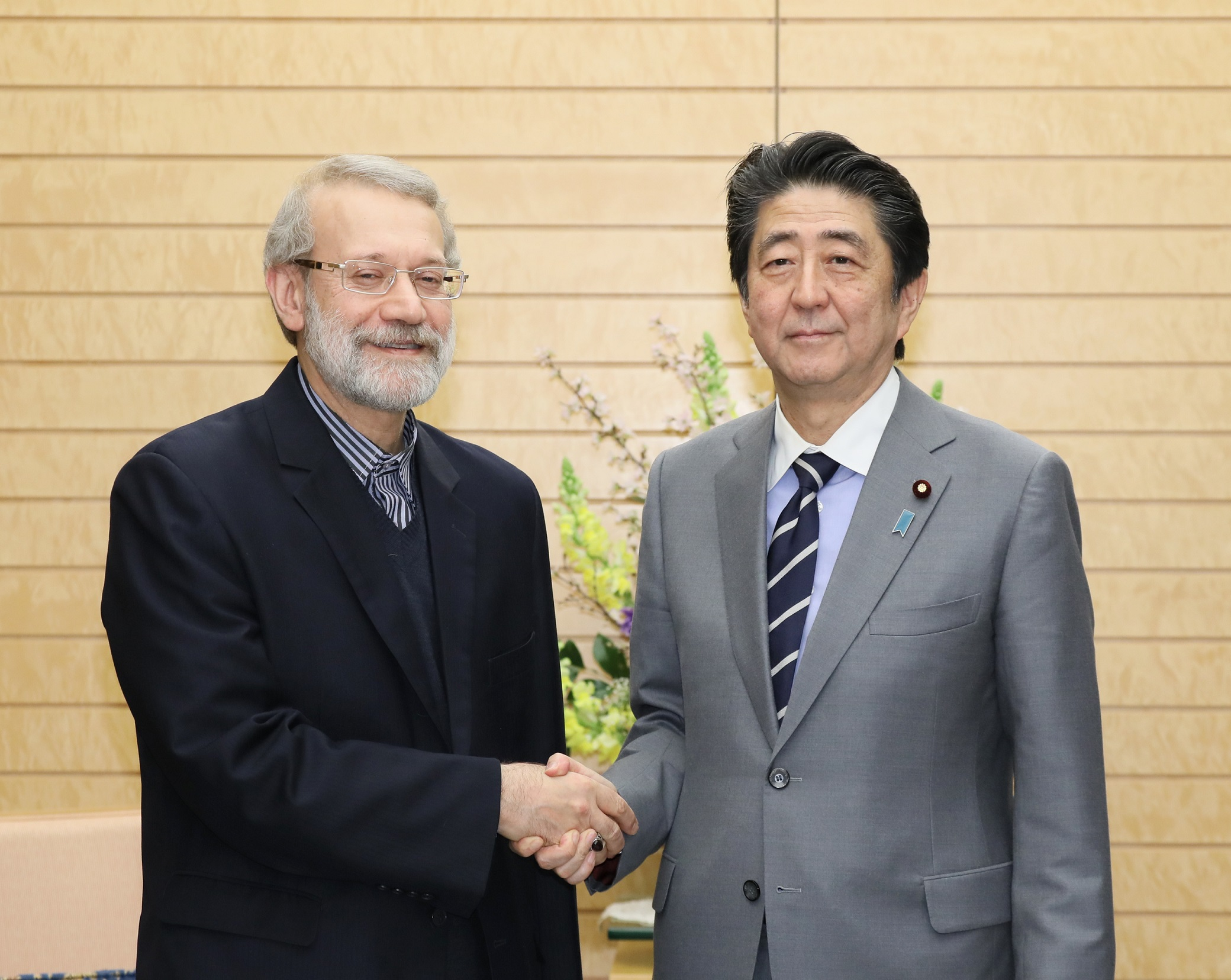
Larijani with Japanese prime minister Shinzo Abe in 2019

In May 2021, Larijani declared his bid for the presidency in the 2021 Iranian presidential election. However, the vetting Guardian Council, in a decision that astounded both the conservatives and reformists, disqualified him from running. Considering Larijani's long career as an Islamic Republic insider who has been part of the top echelons of power since the 1979 revolution, his disqualification was a possibility even his staunch detractors could not envision.

In May 2024, Larijani submitted his application for his candidacy for the president in the 2024 Iranian presidential election, but was again rejected by the Guardian Council.

In March 2025, U.S. president Donald Trump sent a letter to Iran seeking to reopen nuclear weapons negotiations. Ayatollah Ali Khamenei later said, "Some bullying governments insist on negotiations not to resolve issues but to impose their own expectations," which was seen as in response to the letter. Following this, in late March 2025, Larijani said Iran would have no choice but to develop nuclear weapons if attacked by the United States, Israel or its allies.

On 13 June 2025 the Iran–Israel war broke out with attacks on several nuclear facilities. On 22 June, the United States Air Force and Navy attacked the Natanz Nuclear Facility, Fordow Fuel Enrichment Plant, and the Isfahan Nuclear Technology/Research Center.

On 5 August 2025, Larijani was appointed by President Masoud Pezeshkian to become secretary of the Supreme National Security Council for a second time. According to The New York Times, Larijani ran Iran from January 2026 until his death in March of that same year and was in "charge of crushing, with lethal force, the recent protests demanding the end of Islamic rule". Following the assassination of Ali Khamenei, Larijani said that the Iranian government will not "leave Trump alone".

In response to the European Union's decision to label the IRGC as a terrorist organization, Larijani tweeted that the military forces of any countries supporting the EU's decision against the IRGC would be considered terrorist groups and would face consequences of their actions.

== Political positions ==
Larijani was considered to maintain Motalefeh membership and views while in Hashemi Rafsanjani cabinet (1992–1994). Iranian scholar Mehdi Moslem in his 2002 book Factional Politics in Post-Khomeini Iran, suggests that Larijani had been a member of Motalefeh and part of the 'traditional right'. Payam Mohseni, a fellow at the Belfer Center for Science and International Affairs, classified Larijani as a lead figure in the 'theocratic right' camp, whose other prominent members are Mahmoud Hashemi Shahroudi and Mohammad Reza Mahdavi Kani.

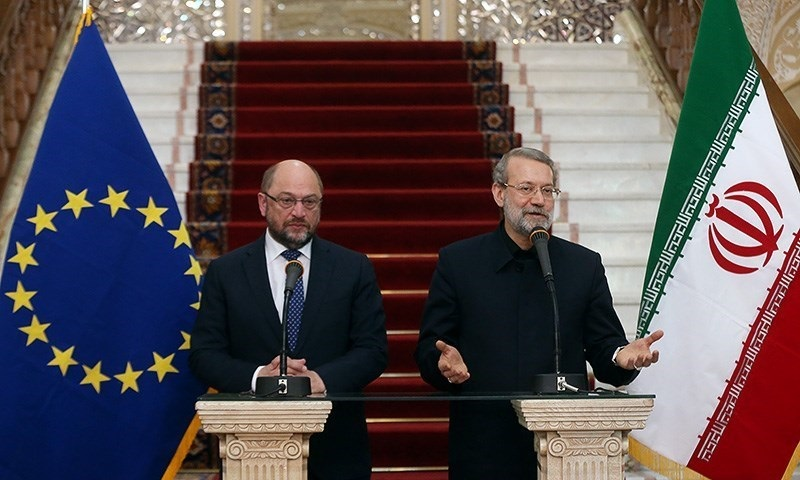
Larijani with Martin Schulz, president of the European Parliament, during a meeting in Tehran on 15 October 2015

Larijani was one of the leaders of the Principlists Pervasive Coalition in the 2008 parliamentary elections, and a United Front of Principlists leader. During the Iranian 2016 parliamentary election Larijani was the leader of the Followers of Wilayat faction, although he was backed by the reformist List of Hope and said he was running as an independent candidate.

He was also described as a center-right or moderate conservative politician who "slowly distanced himself from the Principlist camp" and a "conservative-turned-moderate". He was sometimes described as taking a hardline approach regarding relations to the West, but as a pragmatist regarding internal affairs.

Larijani was known to have close associates, including the interior minister Abdolreza Rahmani Fazli, Behrouz Nemati, spokesman for the parliament's presiding board, and Kazem Jalali, head of the parliament's research center.

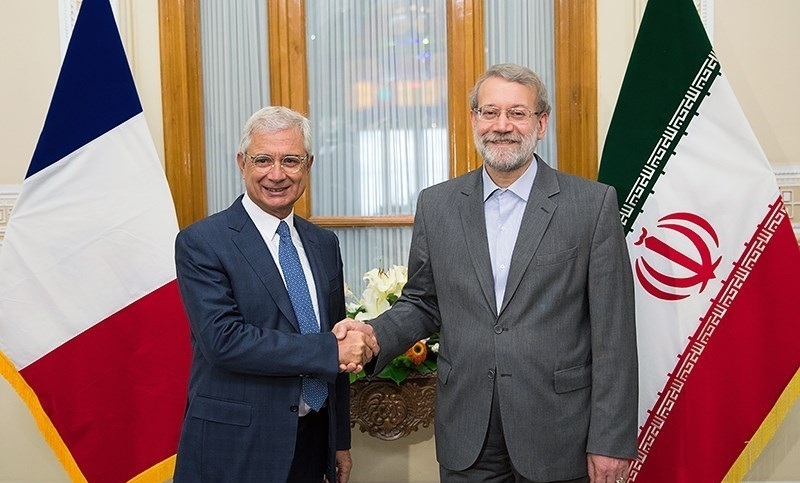
Larijani meeting with French National Assembly president Claude Bartolone in Tehran, 6 September 2016

Larijani supported pragmatism and was because of this seen as a "pragmatic conservative", he was also inspired by Deng Xiaoping's model of the People's Republic of China. However Larijani was critical of too much state involvement in the economy and supported a gradual economic and cultural opening alongside diplomatic engagement. According to Ali Alfoneh, Larijani was also an Iranian nationalist. Larijani talked often about sanctions and the economic pressure which comes from the west.

Larijani saw Velayat-e faqih as a form of democracy.

Larijani was opposed to Mohammad Khatami, while supporting Akbar Hashemi Rafsanjani. Larijani who was against Ahmadinejad supported some reforms of Hassan Rouhani.

One day before his death, Larijani rebuked Islamic countries – particularly the UAE – for "abandoning Iran" and siding with the U.S. and Israel.

Larijani was strongly influenced by his father-in-law Morteza Motahhari. However, it is not known whether Larijani supported Mothhari's Third Way Islamic socialism.

== Role in the suppression of domestic dissent ==
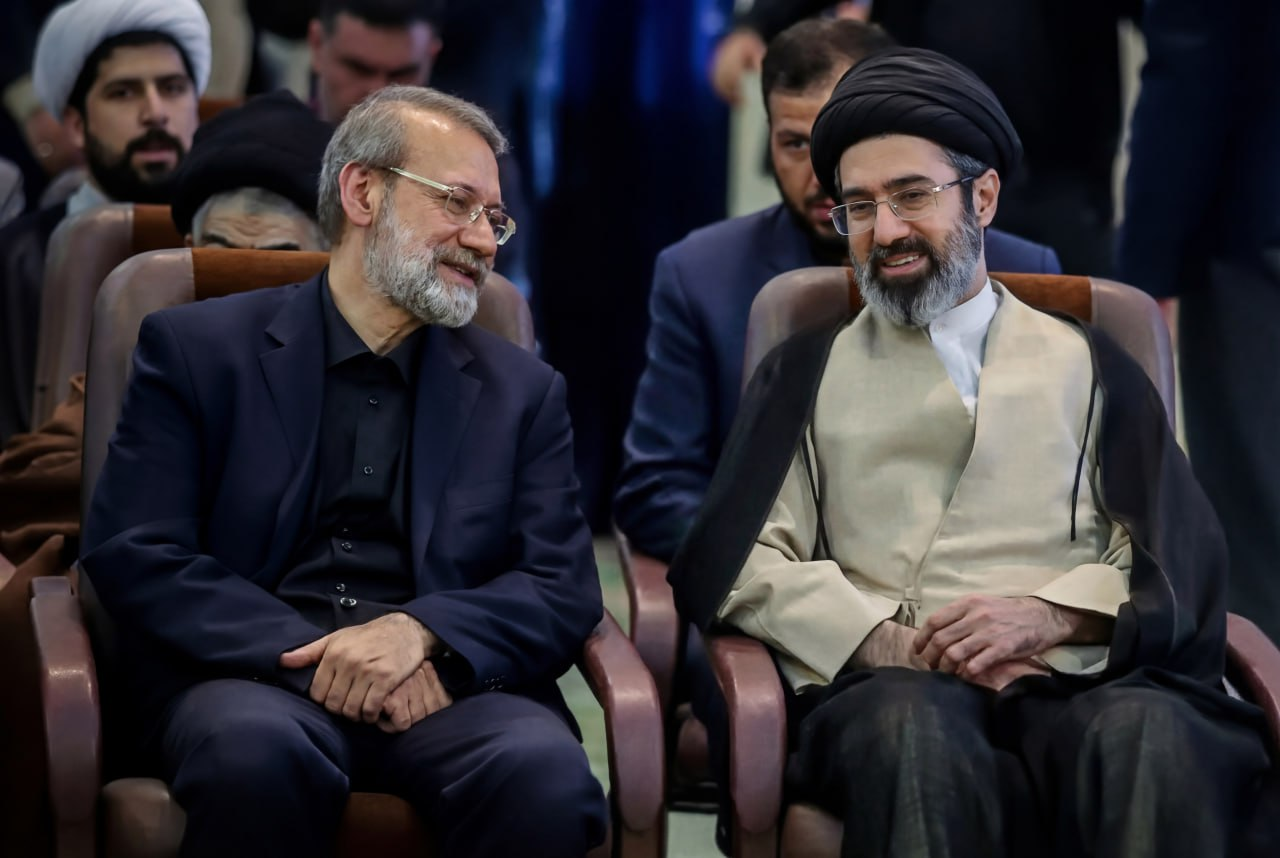
Larijani with Iranian Supreme Leader Mojtaba Khamenei

Throughout his career, Ali Larijani held several high-ranking positions that placed him at the center of the Islamic Republic’s security and information apparatus. While often characterized as a "pragmatic conservative" in foreign policy, his domestic record was marked by the oversight of significant crackdowns on civil unrest.

=== Early security and media roles ===
As the head of the Islamic Republic of Iran Broadcasting (IRIB) from 1994 to 2004, Larijani was criticized for utilizing state media as a tool for the "mass assassination" of the character of intellectuals and dissidents. During this period, the IRIB aired forced confessions of political activists, a practice that human rights organizations identified as a hallmark of the regime's efforts to delegitimize domestic opposition.

=== 2026 suppression of protests ===
Following his appointment as Secretary of the Supreme National Security Council (SNSC) in June 2025, Ali Larijani was identified by international monitors as a primary architect of the regime’s lethal response to the 2025–2026 Iranian protests. Although often characterized as a "pragmatic conservative" in foreign policy, Larijani adopted a hardline domestic stance, reportedly modeling the regime's security response on the "Tiananmen Square" method of overwhelming force.

Larijani was among the first senior officials to publicly advocate for the use of lethal force against demonstrators, labeling them "armed terrorist networks." Human rights organizations reported that the SNSC, under Larijani's coordination, authorized the use of military-grade weaponry and live ammunition, leading to the deadliest wave of repression in the history of the Islamic Republic.

According to estimates from human rights monitors, between 7,000 and 36,500 Iranians were killed during the "January uprising," with a significant portion of these casualties occurring on 8 and 9 January 2026. On 12 January 2026, the United States Department of the Treasury sanctioned Larijani, specifically citing his role in "coordinating the suppression of protests and issuing orders for the use of force against peaceful protesters."

== Public image ==
According to a poll conducted in March 2016 by Information and Public Opinion Solutions LLC (iPOS) among Iranian citizens, Larijani had a 45% approval and 34% disapproval rating and thus a +11% net popularity, while 11% of voters did not recognize the name.

According to the University of Maryland's School of Public Policy report Iranian Public Opinion Soon After the Twelve-Day War released in December 2025, Larijani was viewed "favorably" by 43% (including 8% "very favorably") of the population, up from 32% in March 2024.

== Personal life ==
Larijani was a brother of Sadiq Larijani (President of the Judicature), Mohammad-Javad Larijani, Bagher Larijani (Faculty Member of Tehran University of Medical Sciences), and Fazel Larijani (Iran's former cultural attachée in Ottawa). Larijani was also a cousin of Ahmad Tavakkoli (Larijani's and Tavakkoli's mothers are sisters). Larijani was the son-in-law of Ayatollah Morteza Motahhari.

As of 2018, his daughter, Fatemeh Ardeshir-Larijani, studied at the University Hospitals Cleveland Medical Center in the United States. During the 2026 Iran massacres, Iranian American activists protested her employment at Emory University's Winship Cancer Institute in Atlanta, Georgia. Buddy Carter, a Republican congressman from Georgia, demanded for Ardeshir-Larijani to be fired and her medical licensed to be revoked, labeling her a threat to national security. She was fired two days later. After the start of the 2026 Iran war, the Trump administration terminated Ardeshir-Larijani's and her husband's green cards and deported them from the U.S.

== Assassination ==
On the night between 16–17 March 2026 during the Iran war, Larijani was killed in an Israeli airstrike. His son Morteza and the head of his office Alireza Bayat were also killed in the strike. Fars News Agency reported that he was killed by a U.S.–Israeli strike as he was visiting his daughter in the outskirts of eastern Tehran. Israeli intelligence officials on the other hand stated that they were able to track his movements after being tipped off by Tehran's residents and bombed him while he was meeting with other officials at a hideout in Tehran's outskirts. The commander of Iran's internal Basij militia, Gholamreza Soleimani, was also killed in a separate Israeli airstrike on the same night.

According to The New York Times, the assassination of Larijani raised anxiety among regime officials. One official described shaking when he received the call about the death of Larijani, and said that after the assassination "there was a pervasive sense of anxiety, that Israel would not stop until all of Iran's leaders were killed and the Islamic Republic toppled." Other officials were said to be concerned about their own safety as well as that of Iran's remaining leaders, wondering about who would be targeted next. Reacting to the confirmation of his death by Iran, Iran's supreme leader Mojtaba Khamenei released a public statement expressing regret and vows for vengeance. According to Iran's foreign minister, Abbas Araghchi, his death will not topple "Tehran's strong political structure."

A conservative Iranian analyst with ties to the regime government, Hatef Salehi, referred to the political implications of the assassination and posted that Larijani's absence "would decrease the chances of finding a low-cost political solution to end the war."

On 24 March 2026, he was succeeded by Mohammad Bagher Zolghadr as Secretary of the Supreme National Security Council.

Larijani was buried at the Fatima Masumeh Shrine in his hometown, Qom.

== Electoral history ==
| Year | Election | Votes | % | Rank | Notes |
|---|---|---|---|---|---|
| 2005 | President | 1,713,810 | 5.83 | 6th | Lost |
| 2008 | Parliament | 239,436 | 73.01 | 1st | Won |
| 2012 | Parliament | ▲270,382 | ▼65.17 | 1st | Won |
| 2016 | Parliament | ▼1191329 | ▼40.31 | 2nd | Won |
| 2021 | President | —N/a | | | Disqualified |
| 2024 | President | —N/a | | | Disqualified |

== Bibliography ==
| Year | Title (English) | Title (Persian) | Publisher | Notes |
|---|---|---|---|---|
| 2004 | The Mathematical Method in Kant's Philosophy | روش ریاضی در فلسفه کانت | University of Tehran Press | Kantian epistemology |
| 2004 | Metaphysics and the Exact Sciences in Kant's Philosophy | متافیزیک و علوم دقیقه در فلسفه کانت | Amir Kabir Publications | Kant and science |
| 2004 | Intuition and the Synthetic A Priori Judgments in Kant's Philosophy | شهود و قضایای تألیفی ماتقدم در فلسفه کانت | Hermes Publications | Kantian metaphysics |
| 2005 | Fresh Air | هوای تازه | Islamic Culture Publishing House | Essays / reflections |
| 2024 | Reason and Tranquility in Governance | عقل و سکون در حکمرانی | University of Tehran Press | Political philosophy |

== Notes ==
Military offices
| Preceded by ?Abbas Mohtaj as Deputy Chief of the General Staff of IRGC | Deputy Chief of the Joint Staff of IRGC; Unknown–1992 | Succeeded by Hossein Dehghan |
Media offices
| Vacant Title last held by Ali Akbar Mohtashamipur and Abdollah Nouri; Co-Caretakers | Head of the Islamic Republic of Iran Broadcasting; 1981; 1994–2004 | Succeeded by Mohammad Hashemi Rafsanjani |
| Preceded by Mohammad Hashemi Rafsanjani | Head of the Islamic Republic of Iran Broadcasting; 1981; 1994–2004 | Succeeded by Ezzatollah Zarghami |
Political offices
| Preceded by Mohammad-Ali Shahidi | Vice Minister of Revolutionary Guards for Legal and Parliamentary Affairs; 1986–1989 | Merged into Ministry of Defence |
| Preceded by Saeid Malekzadeh as Legal and Parliamentary Affairs | Vice Minister of Defence for Parliamentary Affairs; 1989 | Succeeded by Hossein Nejat |
| Preceded by Mohammad Khatami | Minister of Culture and Islamic Guidance; 1992–1994 | Succeeded by Mostafa Mir-Salim |
| Vacant Title last held by Ahmad Khomeini | Supreme Leader's Representative at SNSC; 1996–2008; With: Hassan Rouhani | Succeeded by Saeed Jalili |
| Preceded by Hassan Rouhani | Secretary of Supreme National Security Council; 2005–2007 | Succeeded by Saeed Jalili |
Diplomatic posts
| Preceded by Hassan Rouhani | Chief Nuclear Negotiator of Iran; 2005–2007 | Succeeded by Saeed Jalili |
Party political offices
| Preceded by Ahmad Tavakkoli | Coordination Council of Islamic Revolution Forces nominee for President of Iran; 2005 | Coalition dissolved |
Assembly seats
| Preceded by Gholam-Ali Haddad-Adel | Speaker of Parliament of Iran; 2008–2020 | Succeeded by Mohammad Bagher Ghalibaf |
| Preceded by Mohammad-Reza Bahonar as Head of the predecessor Principlists fraction | Head of the Principlists fraction 2008–2012 | Succeeded by Gholam-Ali Haddad-Adel as Head of the successor Principlists fraction |
| New title | Head of the Wilayat fraction 2016 | Succeeded by Hamid-Reza Haji Babaee as Head of the Wilayi Deputies |
| New title | Head of the Wilayat fraction 2016 | Succeeded by Kazem Jalali as Head of the Wilayi Independents |
