= Fazel Larijani =

Iranian politician (born 1953)

- فاضل لاریجانی
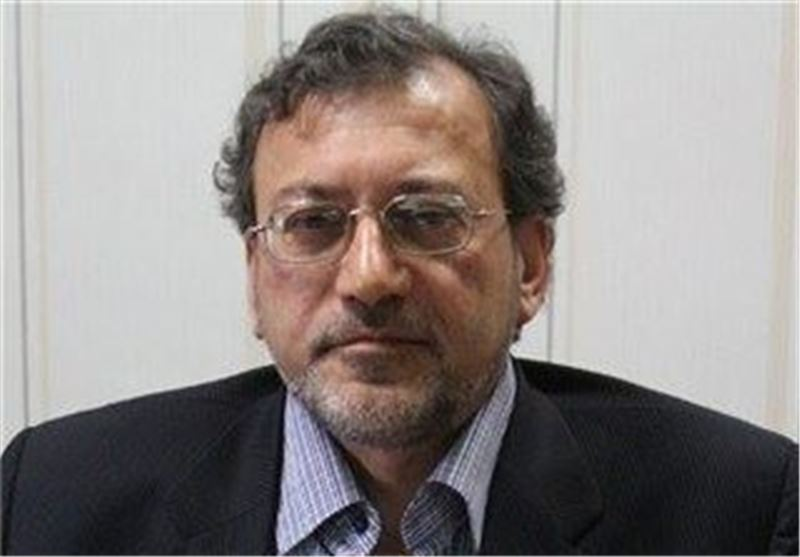

Head of Islamic Azad University, Ayatollah Amoli Branch
- In office 2012–2019
- Succeeded by: Seyed Ahmad Shahidi

Personal details
- Born: Fazel Ardashir Larijani; 1953 (age 72–73) Najaf, Najaf Governorate, Kingdom of Iraq (now Iraq)
- Parent: Mirza Hashem Amoli (father)
- Relatives: Mohammad-Javad Larijani (brother); Ali Larijani (brother); Sadiq Larijani (brother); Bagher Larijani (brother); Abdollah Javadi-Amoli (uncle); Ahmad Tavakoli (cousin)
- Education: Sharif University of Technology; Tarbiat Modares University; University of Southern California
- Profession: Diplomat and professor

Fazel Ardashir Larijani (Note: Persian: فاضل اردشیر لاریجانی) (born 1953) is an Iranian politician and academic. He is best known in Iran for his core involvement in the corruption allegations publicly announced by then-president in the Majlis.

== Career ==
He received his bachelor in physics from Sharif University of Technology and a master's degree in the same field from University of Southern California in 1980. Later he gained a PhD in science and technology policy making from Tarbiat Modares University. He served as head of the Islamic Azad University's Ayatollah Amoli branch from 2012 to 2019. He is also the official member for the Supreme Council of the Cultural Revolution. He was Cultural attaché Iran of Canada.

== Corruption allegations ==
On 3 February 2013, then president Ahmadinejad attended a meeting in the Iranian parliament to defend one of his minister, Reza Sheykholeslam minister of Cooperatives, Labour, and Social Welfare, from impeachment. The speaker of the parliament, Majlis, was Ali Larijani and his brother Sadiq Larijani, who is the head of the judiciary in Iran. When Ahmadinejad went on podium, he accused Larijani family of gross corruption, manipulating judicial and legislative decisions in exchange for own interests. To back his accusation, Ahmadinejad then played a video in the large common screen before parliament members of Majlis while the session was on live-broadcast on the iranian national broadcasting network IRIB. In the video, covertly recorded by a mobile phone, Fazel Larijani was in a meeting with Saeed Mortazavi discussing 'solving problems' for a businessman, apparently referring to Babak Zanjani. In the conversation, Fazel Larijani had implied to Saeed Mortazavi that he could use his brothers’ (Ali and Sadegh's) influence to remove obstacles in return for involvement in some business endeavors, as, he claimed, he did it before for so many other business persons, later named in the discussion. Fazel Larijani denied the allegations and told that he would file a legal complaint against Ahmadinejad and Mortazavi for “spreading lies and disturbing public opinion.”
