= Ahmad Tavakkoli =

Iranian conservative politician (1951–2025)

- احمد توکلی
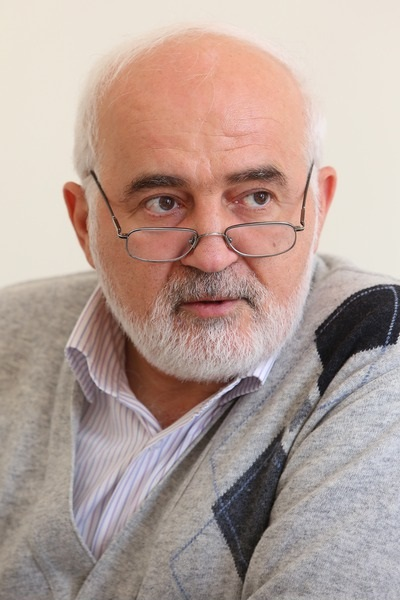
- Tavakkoli in 2014

Member of Expediency Discernment Council
- In office 14 August 2017 – 23 July 2025
- Appointed by: Ali Khamenei
- Chairman: Mahmoud Hashemi Shahroudi; Sadeq Larijani

President of the Majlis Research Center
- In office 1 July 2004 – 1 July 2012
- Preceded by: Mohammad Reza Khatami
- Succeeded by: Kazem Jalali

Minister of Labour
- In office 2 November 1981 – 2 August 1983
- President: Ali Khamenei
- Prime Minister: Mir-Hossein Mousavi
- Preceded by: Mohammad Mir-Mohammad Sadeqi
- Succeeded by: Abolqasem Sarhadizadeh

Member of the Parliament of Iran
- In office 28 May 2004 – 28 May 2016
- Constituency: Tehran, Rey, Shemiranat and Eslamshahr
- Majority: 776,979
- In office 28 May 1980 – 12 November 1981
- Constituency: Behshahr
- Majority: 28,850

Personal details
- Born: 5 March 1951 Behshahr, Iran
- Died: 23 July 2025 (aged 74) Tehran, Iran
- Party: Front of Transformationalist Principlists
- Other political affiliations: Islamic Republican Party; Mojahedin of the Islamic Revolution Organization
- Relatives: Mohammad Javad Larijani (cousin); Fazel Larijani (cousin); Ali Larijani (cousin); Sadeq Larijani (cousin); Bagher Larijani (cousin); Sadegh Zibakalam (co-fathers-in-law)
- Education: University of Nottingham

Ahmad Tavakkoli (Persian: احمد توکلی; 5 March 1951 – 23 July 2025) was an Iranian conservative and principlist politician and journalist. He was a member of the Expediency Discernment Council. Also he was the managing-director of Alef news website and founder of the corruption watchdog, non-governmental organization Justice and Transparency Watch.

Tavakkoli was a representative of Tehran, Rey, Shemiranat and Eslamshahr electoral district in the parliament and the director of the Majlis Research Center.

== Life and career ==
Tavakkoli was the minister of labour under Mir-Hossein Mousavi, a parliament representative from Behshahr, and a presidential candidate in two of the presidential elections in Iran (running against Ali Akbar Hashemi Rafsanjani and Mohammad Khatami).

Tavakkoli temporarily left politics after the leftist opposition forced him out of the ministry of labour. He founded Resalat, a conservative newspaper, and later left Iran to study economics in the UK, where he received his PhD.

=== Views and personal life ===
Tavakkoli was a critic of a capitalist economy, and backed the government's role in controlling the economy. He was a cousin of the Larijani brothers, including Ali Larijani and Mohammad Javad Larijani.

Tavakkoli was also a fierce critic of President Mahmoud Ahmadinejad. On 2 March 2011, PBS's Tehran Bureau reported that Tavakkoli criticized the then President for mentioning only Iran and not Islam in recent speeches.

Tavakkoli died of a heart attack in Tehran, on 23 July 2025, at the age of 74.

=== Electoral history ===
Year	Election	Votes	%	Rank	Notes
1980 (Note: Behshahr)	Parliament	28,850	50.2	1st	Won
1993	President	3,972,201	24.3	2nd	Lost
2000 (Note: Tehran, Rey, Shemiranat and Eslamshahr)	Parliament	382,867	13.06	51st	Lost
2001	President	▲4,393,544	▼15.6	2nd	Lost
2004	Parliament	▲776,979	▲39.40	2nd	Won
2008	Parliament	▼568,459	▲32.65	4th	Won
2012	Parliament Round 1	▼481,012	▼22.69	7th	Went to Round 2
2012	Parliament Round 2	▼404,595	▲35.91	3rd	Won
2016	Parliament	▲862,723	▼26.56	34th	Lost

Academic offices
Preceded by Mohammad Reza Khatami	President of the Majlis Research Center; 2004–2012	Succeeded by Kazem Jalali
