= Hashim Larijani =

Iranian Grand Ayatollah (1899–1993)

- هاشم لاریجانی
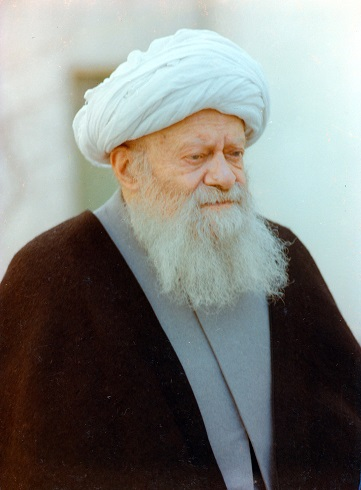
- Born: Hashim Ardashir Larijani; 26 February 1899; Larijan, Mazandaran, Sublime State of Persia
- Died: 25 February 1993 (aged 93); Qom, Iran
- Burial place: Fatima Masumeh Shrine
- Title: Allameh
- Children: Fazala; Mohammad-Javad; Fazel; Ali; Sadiq; Bagher

Hashim Ardashir Larijani (Note: Persian: هاشم اردشیر لاریجانی) (26 February 1899 – 25 February 1993), better known as Mirza Hashim Amoli, (Note: Persian: میرزا هاشم آملی) was an Iranian Twelver Shia scholar and cleric. Born in Larijan, Iran, he is considered the patriarch of the Larijani family and is the father of Ali Larijani, the former secretary of Iran's Supreme National Security Council.

== Biography ==
Hashim Ardashir Larijani was born on 26 February 1899 in the Pardameh village of Larijan, Mazandaran province. He studied Islamic sciences in Amol, Tehran, and Qom. In Tehran, he studied at Sepahsalar School, led by Hassan Modarres. In 1926, he went to Qom and stayed for six years. Larijani achieved his Ijtihad from teachers Abdul-Karim Ha'eri Yazdi and Muhammad Hujjat Kuh-Kamari. After that Larijani migrated to Najaf seminary and stayed there for thirty years. He moved back to Qom around 1963.

Larijani was the father of one daughter (Fazala Larijani) and five sons (Mohammad Javad Larijani, Fazel Larijani, Ali Larijani, Sadegh Larijani and Bagher Larijani), who have held positions in the government of Islamic Republic of Iran.

== Teachers ==
- Abdul-Karim Ha'eri Yazdi
- Muhammad Hujjat Kuh-Kamari
- Mohammad Ali Shah Abadi
- Abul Hassan Sha'rani
- Agha Mirza Taher Tonekaboni
- Mohammad Ali Lavasani
- Mirza Yadollah Nazarpak
- Seyyed Mohammad Tonekaboni
- Mirza Mohammad Reza Faqihe Larijani
- Agha Zia-Addin Araghi
- Muhammad Hosein Na'ini
- Abu al-Hasan Isfahani

== Students ==
Larijani's famous students include:

- Mostafa Mohaghegh Damad
- Mohammad Mohammadi Gilani
- Mohammad Mofatteh
- Jawad Tabrizi
- Naser Makarem Shirazi
- Abdollah Javadi-Amoli
- Mohammad Reza Nekoonam,
- Mohammad-Hadi Marefat
- Mohammad Yazdi

== Death ==
Mirza Hashem Amoli Larijani died on 25 February 1993, one day before his 94th birthday.

== Ayatollah Amoli Larijani University ==
In 1999, Ayatollah Amoli Larijani University was founded and named after the death of Hashim Larijani in the Amol. The land of the university was donated by Hashim Larijani when he was alive and declared this land for promoting knowledge.
