= Mohammad-Hadi Ma'refat =

Iranian Ayatollah (1931-2007)

Mohammad-Hadi Ma'refat (1931 in Karbala – 2007 in Qom) was a Shi'a scholar, clergyman, researcher on Quranic studies and interpretation, and the founder and former president of Tamhid Cultural Institute. He is the descendant of Shaykh Abd-al-'Ali Meysi, the author of Risalah Meysiyyah. He was a member of "Society of Seminary Teachers of Qom" and he held the title of Ayatollah. He had many influential works in the field of Quranic studies such as "Al-Tamhid fi al-'Ulum al-Quran", "Siyanah Al-Quran min-al-Tahrif", "Al-Tafsir wa-al-Mufassirun fi Thawbah al-Qashib", and "Tafsir al-Athari al-Jami". He is buried in Fatima Masumeh Shrine in the city of Qom.

== Education ==
He first attended the Islamic seminary of Karbala. He finished advanced courses of Islamic jurisprudence (Fiqh) and the Principles of Islamic jurisprudence there. He moved to Najaf to study the courses of Ayatollah Abu al-Qasim al-Khoei; then, he moved to "Qom Seminary". Ma'refat attended the courses of Ayatollah Mirza Hashem Amoli and then officially started teaching in the Qom Seminary.

== Works ==
Mohammad-Hadi Ma'refat has many works in the field of interpretation (Tafsir) and Quranic studies. Some of his outstanding works are as follows:

- Siyanah Al-Quran min-al-Tahrif
- Al-Tamhid fi al-'Ulum al-Quran
- Talkhis al-Tamhid
- Introduction to the Sciences of the Qur'an (English translation of Talkhis al-Tamhid Translated by Salim Rossier, Mansoor Limba; Abridged and introduced by Mohammad Saeed Bahamanpuor
- Al-Tafsir wa-al-Mufassirun fi Thawbah al-Qashib (two volumes)
- Tafsir al-Athari al-Jami'
- Shubahat wa Rudud Hawl al-Quran
- Shubahat Wa rudud Hawl al-Quran al-Karim
- Quranic Studies
- The History of Quran
- Teachings on Quranic Studies
- Tanasukh al-Arwah
- Wilayah al-Faqih; 'Ab'aduha wa Hududuha
- Wilayat Faqih (Guardianship of the Islamic Jurist)
- Civil Society
- Malikiyyah al-'Ardh
- Tamhid al-Qawa'id
- Hadith la-ta'ad
- Hadith man Zada fi Salateh
