= Endocrine & Metabolism Research Institute =

Iranian medical research institute

- پژوهشگاه علوم غدد و متابولیسم
- Established: 1993
- Field of research: Endocrine diseases
- President: Bagher Larijani
- Location: Tehran, Tehran, Iran
- Operating agency: Tehran University of Medical Sciences
- Website: https://emri.tums.ac.ir/en

Endocrine & Metabolism Research Institute (EMRI) (Persian: پژوهشگاه علوم غدد و متابولیسم) is one of Tehran University of Medical Sciences research institute with a mission to combine clinical care, research, and education in diabetes, endocrine and metabolic diseases.

== History ==
The Endocrinology and Metabolism Research Institute was established in 1993 as the Endocrinology and Metabolism Research Centre of Tehran University of Medical Sciences in Dr. Shariati Hospital Campus in Tehran.

EMRI has been authorized as the collaborating institute for education, management, and research on osteoporosis and diabetes by the World Health Organization since 2007;.

== Research Centers ==
=== Endocrinology and Metabolism Molecular-Cellular Sciences Institute ===
- Biosensor Research Center
- Metabolic Disorders Research Center
- Obesity and Eating Habits Research Center
- Metabolomics and genomics research center
- Cell therapy and regenerative medicine research center

=== Endocrinology and Metabolism Clinical Sciences Institute ===
- Diabetes Research Center
  - Diabetes Research Centre was established in 2010 in Endocrinology and Metabolism Research Institute. the main activities of the Diabetes Research Center are focused on the sciences related to diabetes, new treatment methods, including cell therapy and pancreatic transplantation, diabetic foot, and gestational diabetes. the most important achievement of the Diabetes Research Center is producing AngiPars drug for treating diabetic foot ulcers.
- Osteoporosis Research Center
  - Osteoporosis Research Center (ORC) is one of the 13 centers affiliated with the Endocrinology and Metabolism Research Institute and was established in 2010 to provide the necessary evidence in the field of osteoporosis at the national and international levels. Currently the ORC collaborate to the World Health Organization since 2010 to 2024 and the International Osteoporosis Foundation.
- Endocrinology and Metabolism Research Center
- Personalized Medicine Research Center
- Evidence-Based Medicine Research Center

=== Endocrinology and Metabolism Population Sciences Institute ===
- Chronic Diseases Research Center
- Elderly Health Research Center
- Non-Communicable Diseases Research Center

== International Collaboration ==
=== World Health Organization ===
Endocrinology and Metabolism Research Institute is WHO Collaborating Center since 2007 in "Research and Education on Management of Osteoporosis and Diabetes".

==== Collaboration Terms of Reference ====
- To support WHO in its work towards reduction and early screening of diabetes, osteoporosis, and their complications, through training and capacity building;
- To support WHO in monitoring and evaluate Sustainable Development Goals (SDGs) through a systematic effort on data collecting, processing and developing analytical models.

=== International Osteoporosis Organization ===
Endocrinology and Metabolism Research Institute has been an active member of IOF, since 2004.EMRI has been involved in raising public awareness and improving professional education by different means such as organizing national and international events, establishment of Osteoporosis Research Center within the institute.

== Achievements and awards ==
=== Achievements ===
- Partner in Horizon 2020 Framework Programme of the European Union for the Project entitled, "PoC in-office device for identifying individuals at high risk of osteoporosis and osteoporotic fracture"; (Project website)
- The development of a new drug for patients with diabetic foot: Angipars™;
- Collaboration with International Osteoporosis Foundation since 2004;
- Collaborating Center of World Health Organization since 2007;

=== Awards ===
1. UN Interagency Task Force on the Prevention and Control of NCDs award, 2018;
2. IOF Committee of National Societies Medal, 2018
