= Mohammad Reza Nekoonam =

Iranian Twelver Shi'a cleric (1949–2024)

Grand Ayatollah Mohammad Reza Nekounam
- آیت الله محمد رضا نکونام
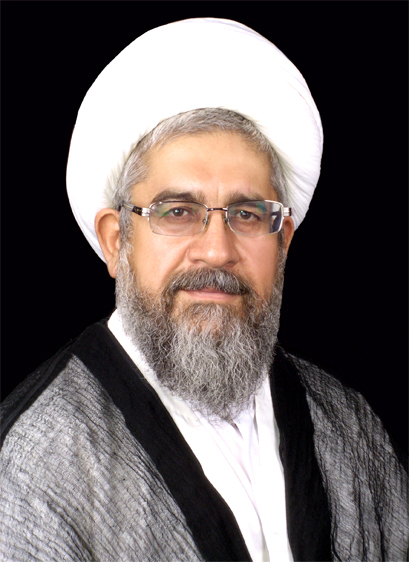
- Nekoonam in 2018
- Born: 9 January 1949; Golpaygan, Iran
- Died: 7 August 2024 (aged 75)
- Website: www.nekoonam.net

Grand Ayatollah Mohammad Reza Nekoonam (Persian: آیت الله محمد رضا نکونام; 9 January 1949 – 7 August 2024) was an Iranian Twelver Shi'a cleric.

== Biography ==
Ayatollah Mohammad Reza Nekoonam was born in Golpaygan on 9 January 1949. From the age of three, he was taught by spiritual teachers and distinguished masters of various fields, particularly, Islamic mysticism. Most of them used to live in Tehran and were the top scholars of Iran.

Nekoonam died on 7 August 2024, at the age of 75.

== Arrest ==
On 1 January 2015, Nekoonam was arrested and given a five-year prison sentence after he defended high-speed internet and called for greater internet freedoms in September 2014. He suffered a stroke while in prison.

On 16 September 2017, Nekoonam was sentenced to 5 years in prison and was stripped of his priesthood.

== Teaching experiences ==
Ayatollah Nekoonam taught for over 40 years at the Qom Seminary. Some of the main areas where he wrote many books on included fiqh (advanced Islamic jurisprudence), usul (advanced Islamic principles), Islamic mysticism, philosophy, moral philosophy, sociology, economics, history, politics, psychology, law, studies of angels and jinn, dream interpretation, poetry, music, women, seminaries, medicine, Koranic exegesis, etymology, etc.

== Publication ==
Ayatollah Nekoonam started writing at childhood. “What Do Literalists (Ikhbari) and Principlists (Usuli) Say?” which caught distinguished scholars’ attention at that time was the first book he wrote at the age of 11. He published over 800 books, over 200 of which have been published in Persian and Arabic. The rest are in print. Furthermore, a selection of his works are under translation into English.

== Teachers ==
Ayatollah Mohammad Reza Golpaygani, Mohammad Ali Araki, Sheykh Morteza Haere, Mirza Hashem Amoli, seyyed Ahmad Khansari, Milani, Adib Neyshabori, Allameh Tabatabai, Allameh Sha'rani, Allameh Elahiye Qomshei.
