= Assassination of Ali Larijani =

2026 assassination in Tehran, Iran

- Part of the 2026 Iran war
- Type: Airstrike; decapitation strike; targeted killing
- Location: Tehran, Iran; 35.6919°N 51.3986°E
- Planned by: Israel
- Target: Ali Larijani
- Date: 17 March 2026; 7 months ago
- Executed by: Israeli Air Force
- Outcome: Successful
- Casualties: 3+ (including Larijani) killed
- Location within Iran

On 17 March 2026, Ali Larijani, the secretary of the Supreme National Security Council, was assassinated in Tehran as part of a series of Israeli airstrikes aimed at high-ranking Iranian officials. His death occurred as part of the 2026 Iran war, which began on 28 February with airstrikes on various Iranian targets by the United States and Israel. Larijani was the top target and most senior official to be killed after the assassination of Iranian supreme leader Ali Khamenei.

== Background ==
Having been appointed secretary of the Supreme National Security Council by President Masoud Pezeshkian in August 2025, Ali Larijani was described by numerous newspapers as the most powerful man or de facto leader of Iran in the lead-up to the 2026 Iran war. Larijani presided over the crackdown on the 2025–2026 Iranian protests and the subsequent massacres of Iranian protestors by the Islamic Revolutionary Guard Corps (IRGC), often referred to as the mastermind of the massacres under orders of Supreme Leader Ali Khamenei.

According to The New York Times, Larijani effectively ran Iran since January 2026 and was in "charge of crushing, with lethal force, the recent protests demanding the end of Islamic rule." As a result, the United States imposed new sanctions on Larijani on 15 January for repressing protestors. Following the assassination of Ali Khamenei on 28 February by Israel and the United States, Larijani said that the Iranian government will not "leave Trump alone."

== Assassination ==
According to senior defense sources, Larijani was experienced at avoiding detection and took several precautions to avoid being detected by Israel, such as by moving between several secret locations since the war began. Consequently, significant intelligence and operational resources were allocated into locating him.

On the night between 16–17 March 2026, Larijani was the target of an Israeli airstrike. Israeli Defense Minister Israel Katz said that Larijani was killed. Iran confirmed hours later that Larijani was killed in the attack. His son Morteza and the head of his office Alireza Bayat were also killed in the strike. Fars News Agency reported that he was killed by a U.S.-Israeli strike as he was visiting his daughter in the outskirts of eastern Tehran. Israeli intelligence officials on the other hand stated that they were able to track his movements after being tipped off by Tehran's residents and bombed him while he was meeting with other officials in a hideout in Tehran's outskirts. Israeli security officials stated that there had been previous attempts to assassinate Larijani, including during the initial phase of Operation Lion's Roar, although these attempts did not result in his death.

The commander of Iran's internal Basij militia, Gholamreza Soleimani, was also killed in a separate Israeli airstrike on the same night.

== Retaliation ==
On 18 March 2026, Iran retaliated by launching a missile barrage at Ramat Gan, east of Tel Aviv, killing two Israeli civilians. The IRGC said it launched missiles at central Israel "in revenge for the blood of martyr Dr. Ali Larijani and his companions."

== Analysis ==
According to analysts, although the assassination of Larijani weakened the Islamic Republic, it would significantly hinder efforts to negotiate an end to the Iran war. Often described as a pragmatist, Larijani was a diplomatic figure central to shaping Iran's strategic decisions. Therefore, Larijani's sudden removal leaves the issues of the Iran war, the 2025–2026 Iranian protests, and the Iranian nuclear program unresolved and transfers them to a successor facing a fragile situation. Remarks by President Pezeskhkian have indicated that the Iranian Armed Forces would have broad authority to act if the senior leadership was decapitated. According to Iranian conservative political analyst Hatef Salehi, Larijani's "absence at this critical and dangerous juncture will cast a deep shadow over diplomacy to end the war and decrease the chances of finding a low-cost political solution to end the war." Former Iranian MP Ali-Akbar Mousavi Khoeini said that "Larijani was viewed as a moderate politician, and he was expected to bring some level of change. In the end not only could he not deliver, but he became a victim himself." On 10 September 2026, former MI6 chief John Sowers said in an interview with the Financial Times that he believed Israel assassinated Larijani on purpose because he could reach a peace deal acceptable to both sides.

== Reactions ==
=== State actors ===
- China: Foreign Ministry spokesperson Lin Jian condemned the killing as "unacceptable" and a dangerous escalation of the conflict.
- Iran: The Supreme National Security Council confirmed the death of its chief Larijani, stating "after a lifetime of struggle for the advancement of Iran and of the Islamic Revolution, he ultimately attained his long-held aspiration, answered the divine call, and honorably achieved the sweet grace of martyrdom in the trench of service." Commander-in-chief of the Iranian Army, Amir Hatami, vowed to launch a "decisive and regrettable" retaliation for the assassination. Supreme Leader Mojtaba Khamenei expressed sorrow for the killing of Larijani, describing him as a "learned, far-sighted, intelligent and committed" figure, and said the assassination demonstrated the "hatred of the enemies of Islam." Foreign Minister Abbas Araghchi emphasized the futility of targeting Iranian leaders, stating "the Islamic Republic of Iran has a strong political structure with established political, economic, and social institutions," and "even the leader was martyred, yet the system continued its work and immediately provided a replacement." He added that "We did not start it. The United States started it and is responsible for all the consequences of this war."
- Israel: Prime Minister Benjamin Netanyahu announced Larijani's death, describing him as the head of a group that "effectively runs Iran," expressing hope that undermining the Iranian regime in this manner would give "the Iranian people an opportunity to remove it." Defense Minister Israel Katz announced that "Larijani and the Basij commander were eliminated overnight and joined the head of the annihilation program, Khamenei, and all the eliminated members of the axis of evil, in the depths of hell."
- Russia: Kremlin spokesman Dmitry Peskov condemned the killing of Larijani and "the murder and liquidation of representatives of the leadership of sovereign and independent Iran."
- Turkey: Foreign Minister Hakan Fidan condemned "the political assassinations perpetrated by Israel, including those of Iranian statesmen and politicians," stating that they "constitute illegal acts contrary to the laws of war."
- United States: President Donald Trump lauded the killing, referring to him as "the man who was responsible for the killing of 32,000 people."

=== Non-state actors ===
- Hamas: Hamas condemned the "treacherous" assassination and mourned Larijani "and all the martyrs who ascended in the brutal Zionist-American aggression" and lauded "his honorable positions in supporting the Palestinian cause and the legitimate rights of our people."
- Hezbollah: Hezbollah condemned the "cowardly assassination" of Larijani and the "ongoing criminal American–Israeli aggression," and affirmed that the assassinations of leaders "will neither break the will of the Islamic Republic nor undermine the determination of its leadership, its people and its fighters."

== See also ==
- Assassination of Ali Khamenei
