= High Council for Human Rights =

High Council for Human Rights of the Islamic Republic of Iran
- Logo of the Council featuring Qur'an verse and cuneiform script from Cyrus Cylinder

Agency overview
- Formed: 2005
- Headquarters: Tehran
- Motto: Arabic: وَلَقَدْ کَرَّمْنَا بَنِی آدَمَ "And indeed We have honoured the Children of Adam" ^{[Quran 17:70]}
- Agency executives: Chief Justice, Gholam-Hossein Mohseni-Eje'i; Secretary, Nasser Seraj
- Parent agency: Judicial Power of Iran
- Website: humanrights.ir/en

High Council for Human Rights (Persian: ستاد حقوق بشر, Sitad-e Heqâvâq-e Beshir) is the governmental national human rights institution of Iran, subdivision to the Judiciary of Iran.

== Positions ==
The council rejects and condemns appointment of Special Rapporteur on Human Rights in Iran by United Nations and strongly opposes the western countries' positions about current human rights situation in Iran. It also assumes the "true face" of human rights should be sought through Islam.

The council has challenged laws against Holocaust denial, spread of Islamophobia, forced unveiling in schools, specifically in France as being against human rights.

The council condemned the Nobel Prize Committee for awarding the Nobel Peace Prize to Narges Mohamamadi in 2023, alleging that she is a criminal.

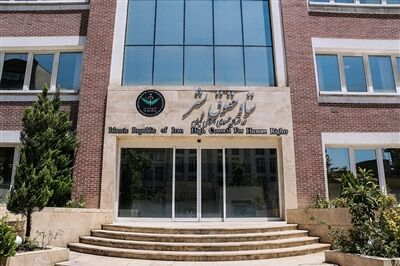
The entrance door of the High Council for Human Rights of Iran building.

== Leadership ==
According to the approval of the Supreme National Security Council, new members were added to this council in the winter of 2023. The new members of the Judicial Branch's Human Rights Council include the head of the IRGC Intelligence Organization, the Chief of the General Staff of the Armed Forces, the head of the Islamic Republic of Iran Broadcasting (IRIB), the head of the National Security and Foreign Policy Commission of the Islamic Consultative Assembly, and the Vice President for Women and Family Affairs, among the new members of the Human Rights Council.

== See also ==
- Human rights in Iran
