= Molla Fathollah Kashani =

Molla Fathollah Kashani was a 15th-century jurisprudent, theologian, and commentator. He is most famous for his commentary on Quran Menhaj Al-Sadeghin. He was a student of Ali Ibn Hassan Zavväri that through him, narrated from Mohaghghe Korki an outstanding scholars of Shah Tahmasp’s court.

Molla Fatholla Kashani died in 1580 A.D. (988 A.H.).

== Notable works ==
- Persian translation of Quran
- Tanbih Al-Ghafelin (The Persian explanation of Nahj Al-Balagha)
- Translation of Ehtejaj Tabarsi also known as Kashf Al-Ehtejäj. The book was written for Shah Tahmasp. An old manuscript is kept in Sheikh Safi's treasury in Ardabil.
- Zobdat Al-Tafsir (Quran commentary in Arabic)
- Manhaj Al-Sadeghin Fi Elzäm Al-Mokhälefin
