= Shahid Rajaee Teacher Training University =

Public University in Iran

- دانشگاه تربیت دبیر شهید رجایی; Daneshgah-e Tarbiyat-e Dabir-e Shahid Rajaei
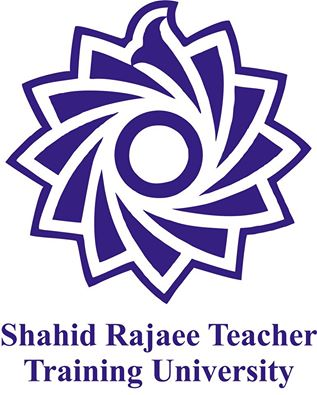
- Type: Public
- Established: 1980
- Chancellor: Ali Porkamali Anaraki
- Faculty: 200
- Administrative staff: 400
- Students: 7500
- Location: Tehran, Iran; 35°46′50″N 51°29′33″E
- Campus: Urban
- Website: www.sru.ac.ir/en

Shahid Rajaee Teacher Training University (SRTTU), is a public university in the Islamic Republic of Iran. The university is named after Mohammad Ali Rajaee, the second president of Iran. The university is located in the North East of Tehran, in the Lavizan neighborhood. The university was founded in 1980 on the premises of the former Tehran American School (1974-1979). The main purpose of Shahid Rajaee Teacher Training University is to prepare teachers to teach the national curriculum developed by the Ministry of Education at public secondary schools in Iran. Most of the graduates in the majors related to engineering teach in technical and vocational education schools.

SRTTU offers both undergraduate and graduate programs in nine faculties and various disciplines for typical students and teachers hired by The Ministry of Education. Programs of typical students are separated from teacher education programs in order to provide professional education for each group. SRTTU is a public university and therefore, the budget for education and research programs is provided by the government of Iran. Students are accepted into this university by Iranian University Entrance Exam (known as Konkur) which is conducted by the Ministry of Science, Technology and Research (MSRT). SRTTU is one of two centers of UNEVOC-UNESCO in Iran. The Campus of SRTTU is located in Lavizan, which is in the north east of Tehran, the capital of Iran.

SRTTU has 9 Faculties:

- Faculty of Electrical Engineering
- Faculty of Civil Engineering
- Faculty of Mechanical Engineering
- Faculty of Metallurgy and new technology Engineering
- Faculty of Computer Engineering
- Faculty of Architecture and Urban Design Engineering
- Faculty of Sciences
- Faculty of Physical Sciences
- Faculty of Humanities

== Rankings and reputation ==
The Shanghai Ranking ranked the Shahid Rajaee Teacher Training University 1201 among world universities in 2022.

Shahid Rajaee Teacher Training University (SRTTU) is ranked 25th in IRAN and +1001 in the world, according to University Impact Rankings 2021, Times Higher Education (THE). It is also ranked 278th in Asian University Rankings - Southern Asia 2025.

== Research ==
=== Journals ===
SRTTU has Journal of Computational and Applied Research in Mechanical Engineering (JCARME) for publishing research in the computational and applied mechanical engineering.

Journal of Technology of Education (JTE) is another Journal of SRTTU which has focused on research for increasing quality level of science and engineering education by using new technologies.

=== Book publishing ===
Publication office of Shahid Rajaee Teacher Training University (SRTTU) was established in 1998 in order to publish research books of faculties and researchers of the university.

== Facilities ==
SRTTU has more than 15 hectares of real estate holdings that include faculties, offices, laboratories, workshops, sports facilities, and student housing and dormitories.

=== Equipped laboratories for engineering education ===
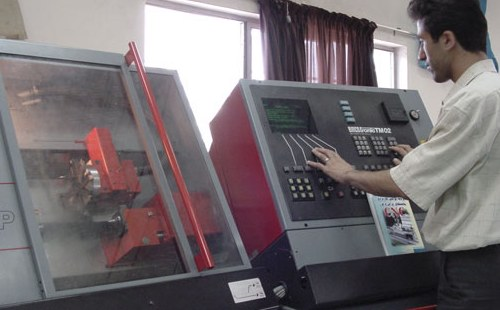
CNC lab

SRTTU has laboratories and workshops for teaching engineering sciences. Metrology lab, machine tools workshop and CNC lab, casting workshop, welding workshops, auto mechanic lab and die designing workshop are some of the university's workshops.

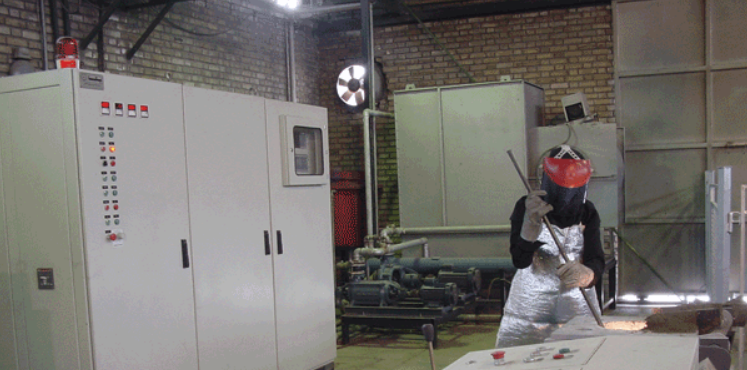
Casting Engineering Workshop

Language laboratory

This lab is located in the faculty of Humanities, building 1. It is equipped with 22 computers, headphones, a digital projector, and a smart board.

=== Sport complex ===
The university has some sport facilities.

=== Central library ===
Number of books in service are about 15,000 volumes in the English and 39,039 titles in the Persian languages.

== See also ==
- List of universities in Iran
- Wikimedia commons page
