= Menhaj Al-Sadeghin =

Book by Molla Fathollah Kashani

- Author: Molla Fathollah Kashani
- Original title: منهاج الصادقين
- Language: Persian
- Subject: Qur'anic exegesis (Tafsir)
- Genre: Islamic literature
- Publication date: 15th century
- Publication place: Iran
- Media type: Print
- Pages: 10 volumes

Menhaj Al-Sadeghin is a fifteenth-century exegesis of the Quran in Persian in 10 volumes by Molla Fathollah Kashani.
