= Majlis Research Center =

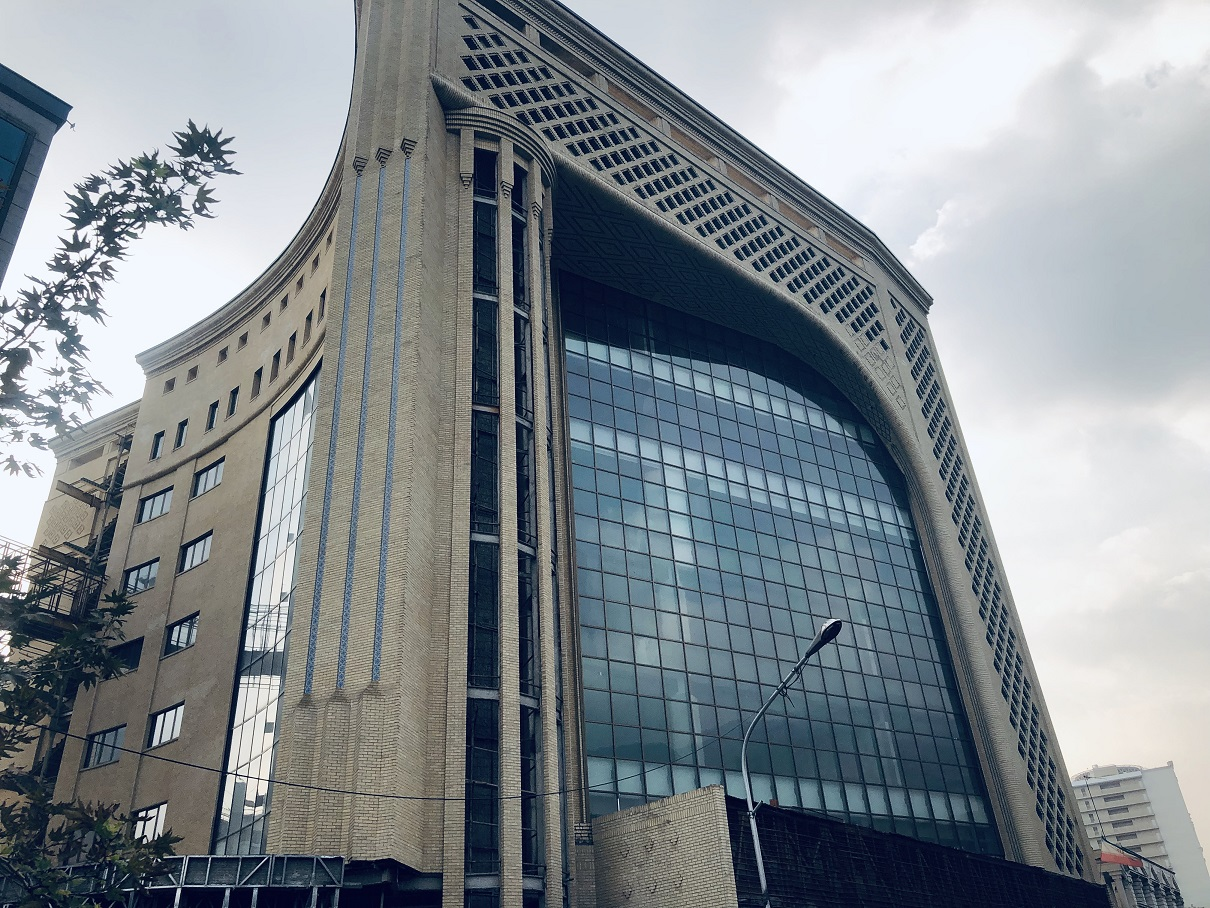
Central building of Majlis Research Center, located in Niavaran, Tehran

The Research Center of Islamic legislative Assembly (Persian: مرکز پژوهش‌های مجلس شورای اسلامی) is the research arm of the Iranian parliament (Majlis). This center works primarily and directly for members of the Majlis, their committees and staff on a confidential, nonpartisan basis. Its president is Babak Negahdari since 5 September 2021.

This center has access to the classified information of the Foreign Ministry, Intelligence Ministry and Defense Ministry of Iran.

== Objectives and duties ==
According to "Job Description of Parliament (Majlis) Research Center" Act, the aim of establishing the center is to carry out research projects in order to provide expertise and advisory opinions to the representatives, the Commission and Parliament's executive board.

According to Article (2) of Job Description of Majlis Research Center Act, its functions are as follows:

1. Study and provide expert opinions on all bills
2. Collect, review, and adjust the opinions of academic researches and research centers, executive agencies, institutions, groups, political parties, and public opinions about community needs
3. Study and research to good law enforcement and regulatory aspects and providing expert recommendations for removing barriers and administrative problems
4. Providing information needs of the Commission and Parliament through the provision and establishment of information system
5. The case studies conducted by the request of executive board, the Commission and Parliament
6. Carrying out assigned missions in libraries of the House that such cases are under direct supervision of Speaker;
7. Dissemination of the results of research studies through:
8. Publication of books and publications

i) Reflection the views in the relevant departments and agencies at discretion of the executive board.

== Organs ==
Under the stipulated Article (3) of "Job Description of Majlis Research Center" Act, the organs of Majlis Research Center are the following:

1. Board of Trustees, consisting of the Speaker, executive board members, and the head of Majlis Research Center.
2. Head of Majlis Research Center
3. Research Council.

Approving the general policy of Majlis Research Center according to the Center Head's proposal, approving budget, approving organizational sub-units and employment, financial, and trading laws, appoint an dismiss of the head are including the duties of the board of trustees.

With respect to Article (7) of "Job Description of Majlis Research Center" Act, head of the center will be chosen among qualified individuals who have high academic qualifications and enough experience for four years by the board of trustees. The main tasks of the head are: to provide policy and budget proposals and supervision over the administration and research.

Research Council is composed of the head, and five academists and experts among MPs elected by the board of trustees and five expert researches are at least assistant professors and introduced by the head of the center and board of trustees' approval. Review and approve research projects, cooperation in the center's annual program, overseeing the publication of scholarly editions and researches of the center, and the establishment of executive program for scientific relations with other educational and research centers inside and outside the country are tasks of research council.

== Study Offices ==
Studies and researches at the center are mainly done in the study offices. Organizational structure of study offices groups consist of a director, several senior researches and research assistants. Offices are required to define, monitor and if necessary conduct research projects, to ensure their public and professional identities; they also required transferring the progress, and achievements and results of operations to the deputy of research. Research groups are known as main centers for research activities of Majlis Research Center. Also, professional offices are supported by "Professional Advisors Council" of offices in various study fields with technical and scientific evaluation of their studies done. Majlis Research Center has a number of professional offices. Each office is associated with one or several parliamentary commissions. Activities of offices are also associated with several administrations commensurate with their duties.

== See also ==
- Economy of Iran
- Government of Iran
- Commission of National-Security and Foreign-Policy (of Islamic Parliament of I.R.Iran)
