= Bagher Larijani =

Iranian medical practitioner (b. 1961)

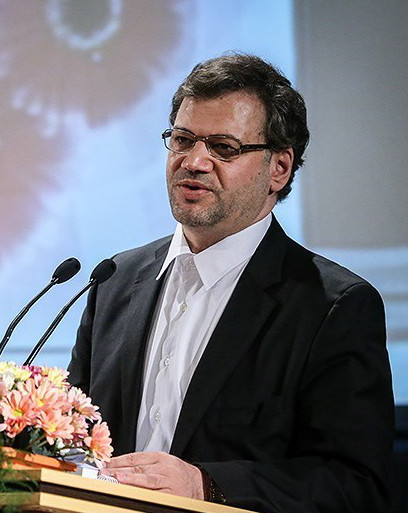
Bagher Larijani (Sep. 2013)

Bagher Ardeshir Larijani (Persian: باقر اردشیر لاریجانی; born May 1961) is an Iranian medical practitioner (Professor of Internal Medicine and Endocrinology) at Tehran University of Medical Sciences. He was Director of the university's Endocrine & Metabolism Research Institute (EMRI).

== Publications and Editorial Positions ==
According to the Scopus database, he has authored over 1,785 articles spanning a diverse range of disciplines. Larijani holds editorial and review responsibilities in several Persian and English medical journals.

== Executive Responsibilities ==
Larijani was the Chancellor of Tehran University of Medical Sciences from 2005 until 2013, when he resigned.

== See also ==
- Fazel Larijani (brother)
- Sadiq Larijani (brother)
- Ali Larijani (brother)
- Mohammad-Javad Larijani (brother)
