= Abdollah Javadi Amoli =

Iranian grand ayatollah (born 1933)

Grand Ayatollah Abdollah Javadi Amoli
- عبدالله جوادی آملی
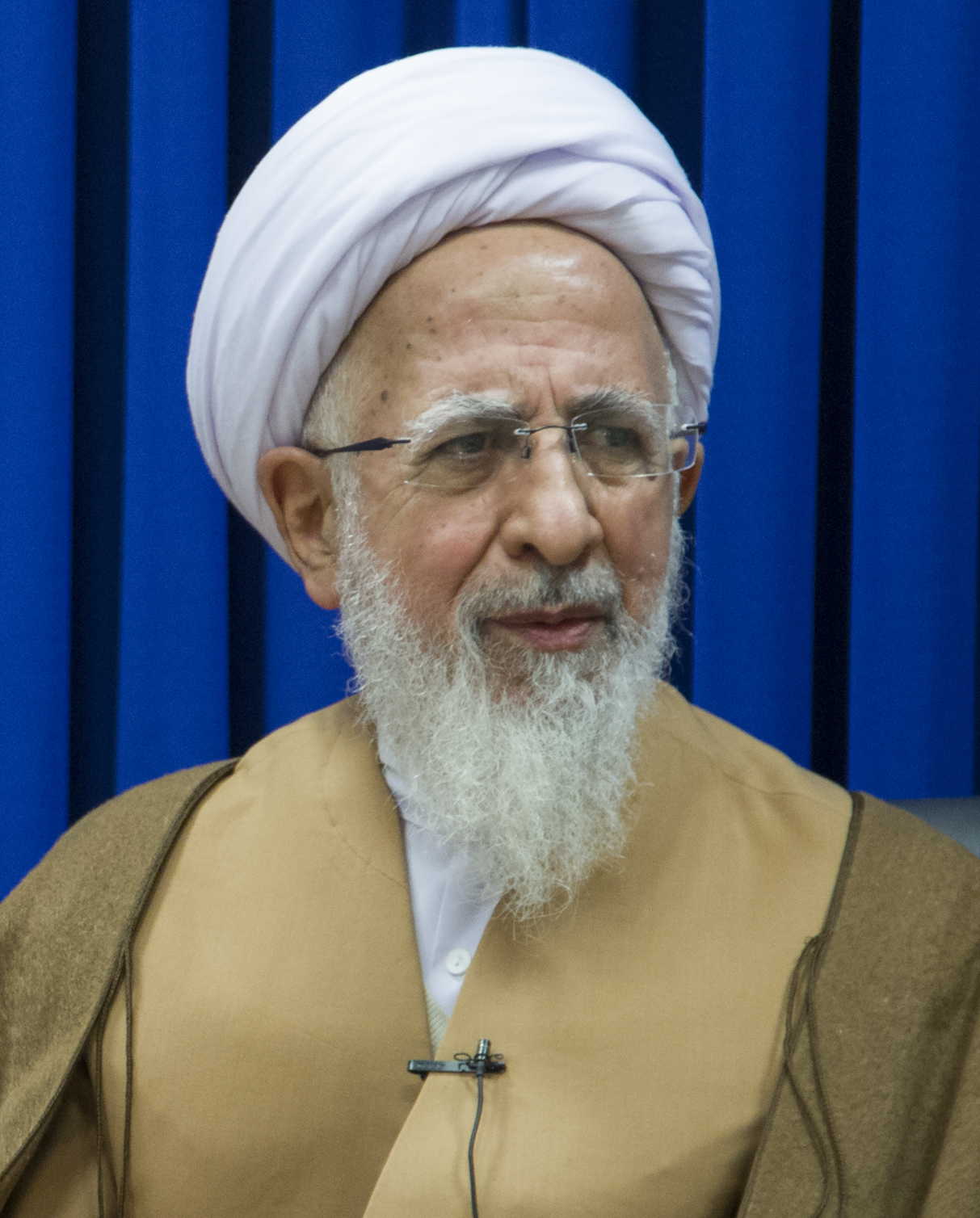
- Javadi Amoli in 2018

Member of the Assembly of Experts for Constitution
- In office 15 August 1979 – 15 November 1979
- Constituency: Mazandaran Province
- Majority: 450,173 (60.1%)

Personal details
- Born: 5 May 1933 (age 93) Amol, Mazandaran Province, Imperial State of Iran
- Party: Society of Seminary Teachers of Qom
- Spouse: Sakineh Rouhi (died 2022)
- Children: 4
- Website: Official website

Religious life
- Religion: Islam
- Denomination: Twelver Shi'a

Abdollah Javadi Amoli (Persian: عبدالله جوادی آملی; born 5 May 1933) is an Iranian Twelver Shi'a Marja. He is a conservative politician, philosopher and one of the prominent Islamic scholars of the Islamic Republic of Iran.

The official website for his scientific foundation, Isra, states that his ideas and views have been guidance to the Islamic Republic of Iran since the 1979 Iranian Revolution, and that "his strategic and enlightening guidance" has been "extremely constructive" during the past three decades. He is known as one of the biggest critics of the banking system in Iran.

== Early life ==
He was born on 5 May 1933 in Amol, Mazandaran Province, then part of the Imperial State of Iran, to a clerical family. After finishing elementary school he joined Amol seminary in 1946 to seek religious studies. His father, Mirza Abul Hassan Vaez Javadi Amoli, was one of the scholars of Amol city.

== Scholarly career ==
For five years, he studied the preliminary seminary courses as well as part of the intermediate courses under the supervision of his father Mirza Abul Hassan Vaez Javadi Amoli among other scholars. The foundations of his moral and spiritual development were also laid in Imam Hasan al-Askari mosque in Amol.

In 1950 he emigrated to Tehran to attend classes of some of the great intellectual figures of the time such as Ayatollah Sheikh Muhammad Taqi Amoli, Allamah Allameh Abul Hasan Sharani and Muhammad Hussein Fazil Tuni where in addition to fiqh and principles, he endeavored in philosophy and mysticism.

In 1955, he emigrated to Qom to attend the last levels of the most advanced scholarly disciplines under such scholars as Grand Ayatollah Hossein Borujerdi, Grand Ayatollah Mirza Hashem Amoli, Ayatollah Ruhollah Khomeini, Grand Ayatollah Taqi Bahjat Foumani and Allamah Muhammad Husayn Tabataba'i.

Among different Islamic disciplines, he has been specially dedicated to the exegesis of the Quran. His exegesis courses started in 1976 and has been ongoing to date.

In July 2026, Javadi-Amoli led the funeral prayer for Ali Khamenei at Jamkaran Mosque in Qom during Khamenei's funeral ceremonies. The prayer was attended by mourners, religious scholars, government officials, military commanders, and other dignitaries.

== In politics ==
Javadi Amoli was the leader of Ayatollah Khomeini's mission to Mikhail Gorbachev, the leader of the Soviet Union in January 1988.

On 27 November 2009, he announced his resignation from an influential position as the Friday Prayer Leader in Qom, saying that one should not hold such a position if one has not proven helpful. He had previously protested unethical approaches to election campaigns. During his farewell address, Amoli clearly pointed out that his resignation was not due to differences with the government but for health reasons. He continues to attend Friday congregational prayers in the city of Qom even after resigning as the Friday prayer leader.

== Views on current issues ==
=== Art and music ===
In response to a question about the impact of mainstream music on soul, Javadi Amoli said "sometimes a supplication arouses a young Muslim and sometimes a ghazal or a qasida but the pleasure of a ghazal is never found in songs since songs cause only a false pleasure, but ode is a nectar that results in true permanent pleasure. Such are the ghazals by Hafez and Saadi." He further said that there are plays that "awake animalistic temper in man" but that he also knows ones that "revive man's angelic mood inducing detachment from lust and anger."

In answer to another question about permissibly of "spiritual and mystical music," Javadi Amoli argued that man's practical reason can find true softness when it becomes occupied with prayer, supplication and ritual crying, becoming as a result obedient to man's theoretical reason — which is cultivated in turn by philosophy and theology — thus abstaining deeds disliked by God. Reciting and composing pleasant poems and prose are highly influential in softening the practical reason to this end whereas musical instruments causes only a "false" softness: "there's a difference when one cries for the oppression bore by Imam Husayn compared to when one shed tears only as a result of hearing the beats of mourning plays." This is the hazard posed by the so-called "mystical" music, Javadi argued.

=== Political views ===
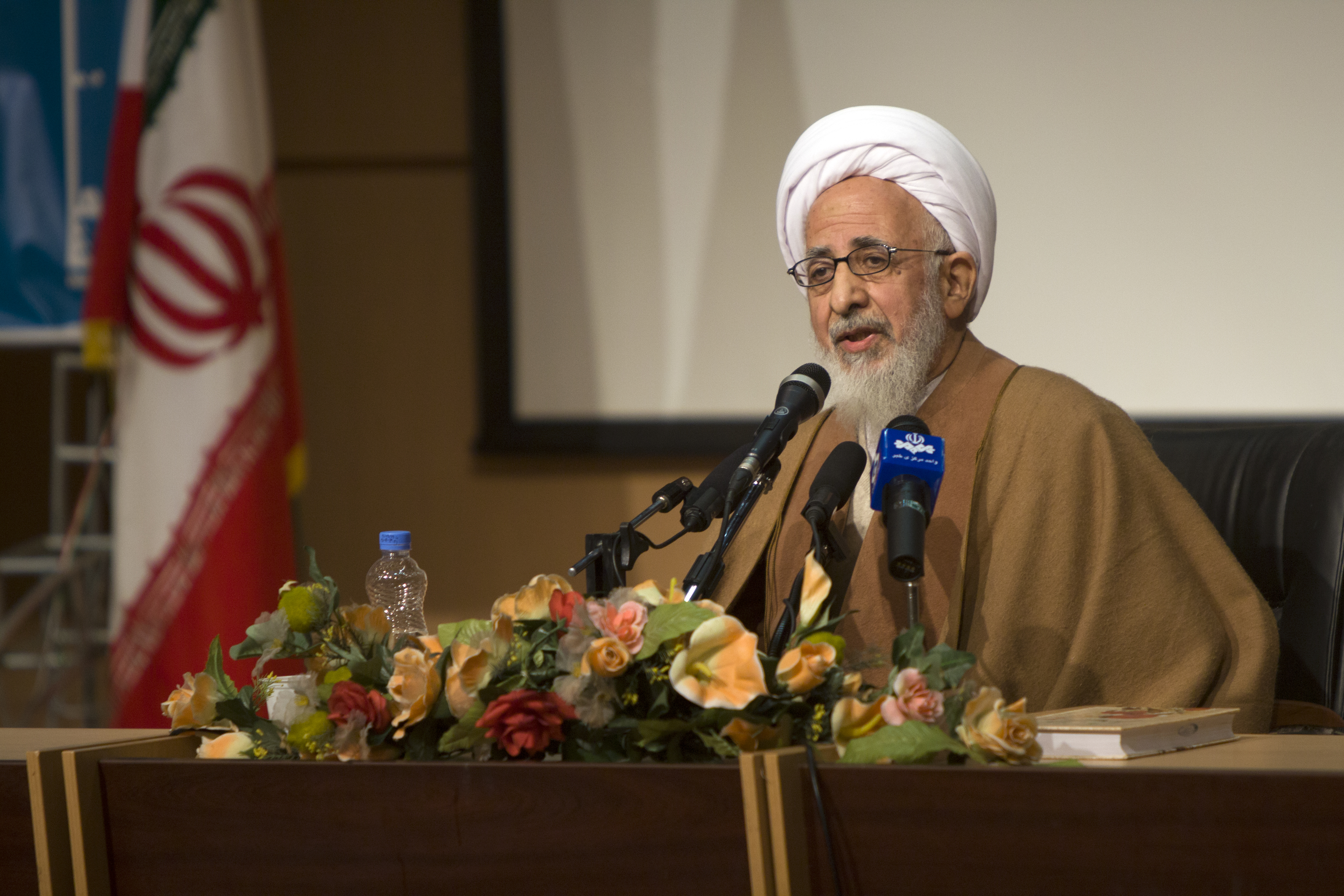
Abdollah Javadi Amoli

In a meeting with members of the national conference on legal alliance of the Muslim world, Amoli argued that Muslim unity is not achieved merely through preaching, but requires distinguishing the nature of disagreement to find out whether it is in beliefs or merely a difference in inclinations. He referred to history of Shia when different denominations avoided clashes despite different views and united with each other based on jurisprudence as a shared asset. He further argued that "Qur’an and Logic can be counted as the sole factor for alliance of all Muslims." In another meeting with Maulana Hatem Zeky al Din, a senior cleric of Indian Ismailis, held in Asra International Institute, Javadi Amoli stated that the core of unity among Muslim community is the Quran as well as the Ahl ul-Bayt adding, "Both the holy Quran and Ahl ul-Bayt (a.s) brought the message of monotheism to mankind and invited them to worship Allah; If the Muslim community truly adheres to Ahl ul-Bayt and Quranic teachings their actions will lead to Islamic unity and there will be no discord among the Muslim Ummah."

In a meeting on 5 February 2016 with Monsignor Liberio Andreatta, the head of the Vatican Pilgrimage Organization on Wednesday, Grand Ayatollah Abdollah Javadi Amoli stated that if the followers of the Abrahamic religions properly follow their prophets, there wouldn't be any conflict between them. He described Takfiri ideology, terrorist groups and proxy wars as creation of "the arrogant powers" hinting at Israel and the United States. On another occasion he stated that since Divine-inspired prophets have all confirmed their successors, thus approving other faiths, followers of all monotheist faiths have always had peaceful coexistence in Iran which is "a model for the global community." He further added that civil society will never be established at gun point. "Relying on waging wars and accumulating warfare, the mankind will never manage to build an exalted civilization, as all civilizations throughout history have been established under the umbrella of divine revelations, knowledge, and briefly speaking, the pen,' said the ayatollah. From the point of view of Abdullah Javadi Amoli, reason is not against religion; It is the beacon of religion, and on the other hand, it can be used to understand the doctrinal, moral, jurisprudential and legal teachings of religion. In a 2025 report, Javadi Amoli was described as framing prayer and supplication as a way of confronting enemies, including the “Zionist regime”. In 2026, during a period of regional conflict following the reported assassination of Iran’s Supreme Leader Ali Khamenei, he was reported to have stated that retaliation against the United States and Israel is a religious duty, with some reports attributing to him statements referring to the shedding of blood of Donald Trump and “Zionists.” According to these reports, a message attributed to him was broadcast by Iranian state media during this conflict period and included similar statements expressed in religious language.

=== Nuclear weaponry ===
Regarding the Nuclear weapons in February 2014, he said in a video message that the official message of religion and humanity is that weapons of mass destruction should not be produced. In a meeting with Secretary General, Mr. Mohammad Javad Hasheminejad from Habilian Association, an Iranian NGO specializing in terrorism research, Javadi Amoli criticized the West's classification of the Lebanese Shia resistant organization Hezbollah as terrorist while "depicting some Takfiri groups as freedom fighters," arguing that the West's definition of terrorism is based on its own interests and passion, whereas "we believe divine sources must be relied upon and used to bring justice. So we will never have double standards. We never consider terrorists as freedom fighters neither will we take defenders of national sovereignty as terrorists. While they [West] support one side of the conflict today and name them as terrorists tomorrow, if their interests necessitate it.”

=== Homosexuality ===
In 2012, Javadi Amoli made controversial statements regarding homosexuality. According to The Guardian and the Iranian news website Khabaronline, he described homosexual acts as morally reprehensible within his interpretation of Islamic teachings and linked them to social problems such as the spread of disease. He reportedly stated that homosexuals were inferior to animals such as dogs and pigs, and also criticized Western politicians supporting the decriminalization of homosexuality, saying that they were "lower than animals".

=== Other ===
In a meeting with a member of Iranian parliament, Javad Amoli criticized the structure of Iran's economy, saying that an economy based on exporting raw materials such as crude oil is not right. "We must process the oil through various means and then export it,” the ayatollah added. In a meeting on May 12, 2016, Javadi Amoli lamented the low rate of per capita book reading in Iran despite being "a country of wisdom and rationality" with its people being "socially aware." Javadi Amoli has repeatedly protested the usury of some banking activities under the guise of Islamic banking. His speech with hatred and tears in the classroom about usury had wide repercussions.

== Works ==
Abdollah Javadi-Amoli has authored works in various fields, including jurisprudence, Quranic exegesis, philosophy, and hadith. His works include:

- Tafsir Tasnim — an 80-volume Quranic commentary; 34 volumes had been published according to the source.
- Tahrir Tamhid al-Qawa'id.
- Kitab al-Salat.
- Kitab al-Khums.
- Ma'arif al-Qur'an min Khilal al-Hawamim al-Sab'ah.
- Epistemology in the Holy Quran.
- Tafsir Surah Ibrahim.
- Theology through Fitra in the Quran.
- Five Treatises.
- Secrets of Prayer.
- Woman in the Mirror of Beauty and Majesty.
- The Mystical Life of Imam Ali.
- Epic and Mysticism.
- The Existing and Promised Imam Mahdi.
- Adab Fana al-Muqarrabin (Commentary on Ziyarat al-Jami'a al-Kabira).
- Islam and the Environment.
- Eternal Life in the Science of Ethics.
- Human Wilayah in the Quran.
- Theoretical and Practical Wisdom in Nahj al-Balagha.
- Ali ibn Musa al-Rida and Divine Philosophy.
- Mafatih al-Hayat.
- Woman in the Mirror of Majesty and Beauty.
- Tawzih al-Masa'il.
- Al-Rahiq al-Makhtum — based on his lectures on Mulla Sadra's al-Asfar al-Arba'a.

== See also ==
- Fatemeh Javadi
- Khomeini's letter to Mikhail Gorbachev
- List of members in the First Term of the Assembly of Experts
- Lists of maraji
