= 2024 in Iran =

- Decades: 2000s; 2010s; 2020s
- See also: Other events of 2024; Years in Iran

Events in the year 2024 in Iran.

== Incumbents ==
- Supreme Leader of Iran: Ali Khamenei
- President of Iran: Ebrahim Raisi (until May 19), Mohammad Mokhber (acting, May 19–July 30), Masoud Pezeshkian (since July 30)
- Speaker of the Parliament: Mohammad Bagher Ghalibaf
- Chief Justice: Gholam-Hossein Mohseni-Eje'i

== Events ==
=== January ===
- 1 January – Iran formally joins the BRICS group.
- 3 January – Kerman bombings: At least 103 people are killed in a bomb attack in Kerman, during a ceremony marking the assassination of Qasem Soleimani.
- 11 January – Seizure of the St Nikolas: The Iranian Navy seizes control of the Marshall Islands-flagged, United States-controlled & Greek-operated civilian oil tanker St Nikolas in the Gulf of Oman.
- 15 January – The Islamic Revolutionary Guard Corps (IRGC) kills four people and injures five others in a ballistic missile and drone attack on Erbil, Kurdistan Region, Iraq. The IRGC also launches a missile at a target in Aleppo Governorate, Syria.
- 16 January:
  - The Iranian government extends Nobel laureate Narges Mohammadi's jail term of 12 years for "spreading propaganda".
  - Iran launches a missile attack within Pakistan's Balochistan Province, targeting what it describes are terrorist sites. Pakistan calls the action an "unprovoked violation" of its airspace resulting in the death of two children and injuries to three others.
- 17 January – Pakistan recalls its ambassador to Iran in response to the missile attack on its territory that killed two civilians.
- 18 January – Operation Marg Bar Sarmachar: The Pakistan Air Force launches "precision airstrikes" on Baloch separatist targets inside Iran in response to Iranian missile strikes against Baloch separatist militants in Balochistan Province on 16 January. Camps belonging to the Baluch Liberation Front and Balochistan Liberation Army are reportedly hit. Explosions are reported in Saravan, Sistan and Baluchistan province, near the Iran–Pakistan border. Four women and three children are killed in the strikes, all of whom are foreign nationals.
- 20 January – An Israeli airstrike targeting a building in Damascus, Syria, kills five IRGC members, including general Sadegh Omidzadeh.
- 21 January – Five soldiers are killed after a fellow soldier opens fire inside a barracks dormitory in Kerman.
- 25 January – The United States Department of Commerce issues a $15 million bounty for information on Hossein Hatefi Ardakani, an Iranian businessman accused of procuring parts for drones assembled by the IRGC and later sold to Russia.
- 27 January – Three gunmen kill nine Pakistani labourers in Saravan.
- 29 January – Four men are executed after being convicted of planning a bomb attack ordered by Israel's spy agency Mossad on a factory making military equipment.

=== February ===
- 8 February – Meta removes the Instagram accounts of Supreme Leader Ali Khamenei for violating its "Dangerous Organizations & Individuals policy".
- 11 February – Two Basij members are killed in an attack on an outpost in Sistan and Baluchestan province.
- 14 February – Explosions occurred along the route of a natural gas pipeline spanning from Chaharmahal and Bakhtiari province to the Caspian Sea. Officials blamed the incident on "terrorism and sabotage".
- 17 February – Twelve people are killed after a man opens fire on his relatives during a family dispute at a village in Kerman province.

=== March ===
- 1 March –
  - Grammy winner Shervin Hajipour is sentenced to jail and ordered to write anti-American music.
  - 2024 Iranian legislative election: Voter turnout reaches its the lowest levels recorded since the 1979 Iranian revolution.
- 7 March – Iran confiscates the cargo of the American oil tanker Advantage Sweet in response to US-led sanctions restricting the sale of medication for epidermolysis bullosa to Iran.
- 8 March – A UN fact-finding mission probe finds that human rights violations committed by the Iranian government amount to crimes against humanity.
- 29 March – Pouria Zeraati, an anti-Iranian regime journalist working for Iran International, is stabbed by unidentified attackers in London. He is taken to hospital, where he is in stable condition.

=== April ===
- 1 April – 2024 Iranian consulate airstrike in Damascus: An Israeli airstrike targeting the Iranian embassy in Damascus kills eight IRGC members, including brigadier general Mohammad Reza Zahedi.
- 4 April – Eleven IRGC officers and 16 militants are killed and ten other members of the security forces are injured in attacks by Jaysh al-Adl in Chabahar and Rask, Sistan and Baluchestan.
- 9 April – Six police officers are killed and two others are injured in an attack on their convoy in Sistan and Baluchestan.
- 13 April –
  - Iran seizes the MSC Aries, a Portuguese-registered, Madeira-flagged container ship leased by MSC from Gortal Shipping, which is an affiliate of Zodiac Maritime, whose principal is an Israeli.
  - 2024 Iranian strikes in Israel: Iran launches between 400 and 500 drones and cruise missiles at Israel from Iran, Iraq, Syria, southern Lebanon, and Yemen.
- 19 April –
  - Missiles believed to be fired by the Israel Defense Forces allegedly hit sites near Isfahan, sites in Iraq and radar sites in Syria.
  - A man threatens to blow himself up near the Iranian Embassy in Paris, France, and is later arrested.

=== May ===
- 9 May – Iran warns it will build a nuclear weapon if Israel continues to target its nuclear facilities.
- 10 May – 2024 Iranian legislative election (second round).
- 16 May – Police arrest 264 people, including three Europeans, on charges of "spreading the culture of satanism and nudity" in Shahriar County, Tehran province.
- 19 May –
  - A helicopter carrying eight people, including President Ebrahim Raisi, Foreign Minister Hossein Amir-Abdollahian, Governor of East Azerbaijan Malek Rahmati, and the Supreme Leader's representative in East Azerbaijan Mohammad Ali Ale-Hashem crashes in East Azerbaijan province, killing all occupants.
  - Police chief Ahmad-Reza Radan disappears while in Tehran's Narmak neighborhood until June next year.
- 20 May – First vice president of Iran Mohammad Mokhber becomes acting president following the death of Ebrahim Raisi.
- 29 May – Four Pakistanis are killed and two others are injured after their vehicle is fired upon by Iranian border guards near Mashkel, Pakistani Balochistan.

=== June ===
- 2 June – Former president Mahmoud Ahmadinejad announces he intends another run for President of Iran following the death of Ebrahim Raisi. However, his candidacy is rejected by the Guardian Council on 9 June.
- 15 June – Hamid Nouri, an Iranian official serving life imprisonment in Sweden for his role in the 1988 executions of Iranian political prisoners, is released in exchange for two Swedish nationals held on charges of spying in Iran as part of a prisoner swap brokered by Oman.
- 18 June –
  - 2024 Razavi Khorasan earthquake: At least four people are killed by a magnitude 5.0 earthquake in Kashmar.
  - Nine people are killed during a fire caused by an electric short circuit at a hospital in Rasht.
  - A court sentences Nobel Peace Prize laureate Narges Mohammadi to one year in prison for propaganda against the Iranian state.
- June 19 – Canada adds the Islamic Revolutionary Guard Corps to its list of terrorist entities.
- June 28 – 2024 Iranian presidential election: Saeed Jalili and Masoud Pezeshkian advance to the presidential run-off, amid record-low voter attendance.

=== July ===
- July 3 – Iran and Turkmenistan sign an agreement to build a 125-kilometer pipeline that would deliver 10 billion cubic meters of natural gas to Iraq annually.
- July 5 – 2024 Iranian presidential election: Reformist Masoud Pezeshkian wins a second round run-off against ultra-conservative Saeed Jalili to become the 9th President of Iran.
- July 7 – The Islamic Republic of Iran Navy destroyer IRIS Sahand sinks during repairs at a port in the Strait of Hormuz, injuring several sailors.
- July 9 –
  - The IRGC announces the dismantling of a "counter-revolutionary terrorist team" in West Azerbaijan province.
  - United States Director of National Intelligence Avril Haines accuses the Iranian government of using social media to covertly encourage and finance pro-Palestinian campus protests, in order to deepen political divisions in the US and increase distrust in democratic institutions.
- July 15 – Azerbaijan reopens its embassy in Tehran following efforts to repair relations strained since 2023.
- July 21 – Iran and Sudan exchange ambassadors for the first time since the cutting of relations in 2016.
- July 28 –
  - All government and commercial offices are shut down due to a nationwide heatwave.
  - Masoud Pezeshkian is officially endorsed as President by Supreme Leader Ali Khamenei.
- July 30 – Masoud Pezeshkian is officially inaugurated as President.
- July 31 – Ismail Haniyeh, the head of Hamas, is assassinated in Tehran.

=== August ===
- August 6 – The Iranian government executes a man who was convicted of killing an IRGC officer during anti-government and mandatory hijab law protests in 2022.
- August 19 – US security agencies formally accuse Iran of orchestrating a cyberhacking incident targeting the presidential campaign of Donald Trump.
- August 20 –
  - The Iranian government orders the closure of the Institute For Teaching German Language in Tehran in retaliation for the closure of the Islamic Centre Hamburg by German authorities in July over terrorism links.
  - A bus carrying Pakistani pilgrims to Iraq overturns in Dehshir-Taft, Yazd province, killing 28 people and injuring 23 others.
- August 21 – The Islamic Consultative Assembly approves the nomination of all members of President Pezeshkian's cabinet, the first time it has approved all members of a cabinet since 2001.
- August 28 – Two IRGC officers are killed and ten others are injured by a gas leak at one of the force's workshops in Isfahan province.
- August 29 – The government of Hamburg, Germany, expels the Iranian leader of the Islamic Centre Hamburg Mohammad Hadi Mofatteh, giving him a September 11 deadline to leave the country or face deportation.

=== September ===
- September 1 – A weather station near Qeshm International Airport in Dayrestan, records the highest unverified heat index on Earth of 82.2 °C (180.0 °F) and the highest dew point of 36.1 °C (97.0 °F).
- September 9 –
  - U.S. Secretary of State Antony Blinken confirms that Russia has received a shipment of Fath 360 tactical ballistic missiles from Iran, and expects their deployment "within weeks". Iran denies the reports, calling it "psychological warfare".
  - The United Kingdom, France and Germany announce new sanctions on Iran for supplying Russia with ballistic missiles against Ukraine.
- September 12 – Three border guards are killed in a gun attack on their vehicle in Mirjaveh County, Sistan and Baluchestan, that is claimed by Jaysh al-Adl.
- September 15 – Thirty-four women detainees at Evin Prison in Tehran go on a hunger strike in commemoration of the second anniversary of the death of Mahsa Amini.
- September 17 –
  - The Iranian ambassador to Lebanon, Mojtaba Amani, is injured along with two embassy staff in a series of explosions targeting Hezbollah members across Lebanon.
  - An Austrian national is released from a prison in West Azerbaijan after being detained for an undisclosed duration for unspecified charges.
  - A bus overturns in Yazd Province, killing ten people and injuring 41 others.
- September 20 – Supreme Leader Ali Khamenei issues pardons and commutations for 2,887 inmates, including 59 people on death row, 39 people convicted on anti-state charges, and 40 foreign nationals, on the occasion of Mawlid.
- September 21 – 2024 Tabas coal mine explosion: At least 51 miners are killed and 28 others are injured in an explosion caused by a methane gas leak at a coal mine in Tabas.
- September 22 – The IRGC arrests twelve people in six different provinces on suspicion of working as foreign operatives for Israel and "planning acts against Iran's security".
- September 23 – Rapper and Grammy Award winner Shervin Hajipour, who was imprisoned by the Iranian regime for his song Baraye covering the Mahsa Amini protests, is released after receiving a pardon.
- September 24 – Sweden formally accuses the IRGC and the Ministry of Intelligence of carrying out a 2023 cyberattack involving the dissemination of 15,000 messages calling for revenge against people who had burned Korans.
- September 27 –
  - IRGC general Abbas Nilforoushan is killed in an Israeli airstrike on the headquarters of Hezbollah in Beirut, Lebanon, that also kills the group's secretary-general, Hassan Nasrallah.
  - The United States Justice Department charges three IRGC members for hacking Republican candidate Donald Trump's presidential campaign and "trying to disrupt the 2024 presidential election".

=== October ===
- October 1 –
  - Six people, including a town council head and a local IRGC commander, are killed in separate gun attacks on the towns of Nik Shahr and Khash in Sistan and Baluchestan.
  - October 2024 Iranian strikes against Israel: Iran launches a series of missile attacks against Israel.
- October 3 – At least 26 people are reported to have died from methanol poisoning after consuming unregulated alcohol in Mazandaran, Gilan and Hamadan provinces.
- October 13 – Two Afghan nationals are killed in a shooting by Iranian security forces near Saravan.
- October 23 – The United States charges Brigadier General Ruhollah Bazghandi, the former head of counterintelligence of the IRGC, and three others, over a plot to assassinate exiled dissident Masih Alinejad.
- October 26 – October 2024 Israeli strikes on Iran: Israel launches a series of missile attacks against Iran, including on Tehran, killing four soldiers.
- October 27 – Jamshid Sharmahd, a dissident also carrying German citizenship, is executed by the regime for allegedly leading a US-based pro-monarchist group and terrorism, prompting the German government to recall its ambassador to Iran on 29 October and close all three consulates of Iran in Germany on 31 October.

=== November ===
- November 2 – Iranian student Ahoo Daryaei, who stripped to her bra and underwear in hijab protest after members of Basij shouted at her, grabbed her aggressively, attempted to pull her clothes off and tried to drag her into an internal room used to punish female students accused of violating dress rules after her headscarf fell from her head while she was walking through the university and looking at her phone is forced into psychiatric treatment.
- November 4 – Two IRGC officers, including general Hamid Mazandarani and a pilot, are killed in the crash of an autogiro during an anti-terror operation in Sirkan, Sistan and Baluchestan.
- November 8 – An Afghan national is charged in the United States with plotting to assassinate president-elect Donald Trump on behalf of the IRGC.
- November 10 – Five members of the Basij are killed in an attack by unidentified militants in Saravan, Sistan and Baluchestan.
- November 12 – Mohammad Ali Salamat, deemed the most prolific serial rapist in Iran with over 200 cases lodged against him, is executed in Hamadan.
- November 18 – The European Union imposes sanctions on the IRISL Group for its role in the export of military equipment and technology.

=== December ===
- December 4 –
  - Imprisoned Nobel Peace Prize laureate Narges Mohammadi is temporarily released from jail for medical reasons.
  - An Islamic Republic of Iran Air Force fighter jet crashes near Firuzabad, Fars, killing its two pilots.
- December 14 – A court in Tehran sentences Iranian-American journalist Reza Valizadeh to ten years' imprisonment on charges of working for the United States.
- December 19 – Cecilia Sala, an Italian journalist working for the newspaper Il Foglio and the podcast company Chora Media, is arrested by police in Tehran on unspecified charges.
- December 21 – A bus falls off a ravine in Pa Alam, Lorestan province, killing nine people and injuring 14 others.
- December 28 – A police captain is killed in a suicide bombing in Bandar Lengeh.

== Deaths ==
- 1 January – Camila Batmanghelidjh, 61, Iranian-Belgian charity executive, founder of Kids Company.
- 7 January – Tofy Mussivand, 81, Iranian-Canadian medical engineer.
- 8 January – Shahla Lahiji, 81, writer.
- 11 January – Fariyar Aminipour, 23, Muay Thai fighter.
- 15 January – Karim Mojtahedi, 93, philosopher.
- 20 January – Sadegh Omidzadeh, intelligence officer (Quds Force).
- 23 January –
  - Mohammad Ghobadloo, 23, political activist.
  - Ali Orumian, 92, ayatollah, MP (1984–1988) and member of the Assembly of Experts (1990–2006).
- 28 January – Abdul-Nabi Namazi, 75–76, Twelver Shia cleric and politician, prosecutor-general (2001–2004) and member of the Assembly of Experts (since 1990).
- 9 February –
  - Ali Akbar Sarfaraz, 96, archaeologist.
  - Iraj Tanzifi, 85, sculptor and painter.
- 27 February – Fathollah Moztarzadeh, 77, biomedical engineer.
- 2 March – Mohammed Emami-Kashani, 92, politician, member of the Assembly of Experts (since 1983).
- 9 March – Hamid Behbahani, 83, engineer and politician, minister of roads and transportation (2008–2011).
- 20 March – Faramarz Aslani, 79, singer, guitarist and music producer.
- 26 March – Zahra Shojaei, 67, politician.
- 1 April –
  - Reza Davood Nejad, 43, actor (The Accused Escaped, Reza, Without Her) and television presenter.
  - Mohammad Reza Zahedi, 63, military officer, commander of Islamic Revolutionary Guard Corps Aerospace Force (2005–2006) and Islamic Revolutionary Guard Corps Ground Forces (2006–2008).
- 18 April – Parviz Davoodi, 72, politician, first vice president (2005–2009) and member of the Expediency Discernment Council (since 2007).
- 19 May –
  - Ebrahim Raisi, 63, President of Iran (2021–2024).
  - Hossein Amir-Abdollahian, 60, Foreign Minister of Iran (2021–2024)
  - Malek Rahmati, Governor General of East Azerbaijan province (2024)
  - Mohammad Ali Ale-Hashem, 61–62, Representative of the Supreme Leader of Iran in East Azerbaijan province (2017–2024)
- 13 November – Kianush Sanjari, 42, journalist.
