= Israeli airstrike on the Iranian consulate in Damascus =

2024 Israeli airstrike in Syria

- Part of the 2024 Iran–Israel conflict, the Spillover of the Gaza war in Syria, the Iran–Israel conflict during the Syrian civil war, the Israel–Hezbollah conflict and the Iran–Israel proxy conflict
- Location: Mezzeh, Damascus, Syria; 33°30′14.0″N 36°15′37.6″E
- Target: Consular section of the Iranian Embassy in Damascus
- Date: 1 April 2024 c. 17:00 (UTC+3)
- Executed by: Israel (Note: Israel has not officially claimed responsibility for the attack.)
- Outcome: Building destroyed, targeted people and civilians killed
- Casualties: 16 killed: 7 Islamic Revolutionary Guard Corps officers; 5 Iran-backed militiamen; 1 Hezbollah member; 1 Iranian advisor; 2 Syrian civilians
- Location of the consulate in Syria

Location of consular building of Iranian embassy in Damascus

On 1 April 2024, Israel conducted an airstrike on the Iranian embassy complex in Damascus, Syria, destroying the building housing its consular section. The airstrike began the 2024 Iran–Israel conflict, and took place during a period of heightened tension between Israel and Iran, and amidst the Gaza war and the Israel–Hezbollah conflict.

Sixteen people were killed in the strike, including two Syrian civilians and eight officers of the Islamic Revolutionary Guard Corps (IRGC). Quds Force commander in Syria and Lebanon Mohammad Reza Zahedi was the attack's target and was killed in it. The IRGC and its Quds Force are recognized as a terrorist organization by Bahrain, Canada, the United States, Israel, and others.

The attack was condemned by numerous international organizations and countries in Europe, Asia and elsewhere, and many argued that the attack violated international law. Israel said the building was not a diplomatic building but rather a military installment of the Quds Force; several of those killed were Quds Force activists. France 24 showed published images showing the building was indeed a consulate and part of Iran's embassy complex. Further, the building also housed the Iranian ambassador, although he was not on site at the time of the attack. Embassies around the world frequently host military attachés.

On 13 April 2024, Iran retaliated against the attack with missile and drone strikes in Israel, stating that it was targeting the military base from which Israel had launched the attack.

== Background ==
=== Previous Israeli attacks against Iran ===
Since 2010, Iran (and others) have accused Israel of killing Iranian nuclear scientists inside Iran. In 2018, Israeli spies raided an Iranian military facility in Tehran. In February 2022, Israel was accused of having assassinated an Iranian commander in Tehran. Iran also accused Israel of attacking a military facility in Isfahan in January 2023.

=== Syrian civil war ===
Since 2013, Iran has maintained a presence of its troops in Syria in response to the Syrian civil war, as Syria is a crucial ally of Iran. Additionally, it has been involved in training and funding paramilitary forces from Hezbollah, along with foreign militias from Iraq and Afghanistan, not only in Syria but also in neighboring Lebanon. Since the outbreak of the Syrian civil war in 2011, Israel has conducted hundreds of airstrikes targeting Hezbollah assets within the country.

With the onset of the Gaza war in October 2023, Israel has increased the intensity of its attacks on Syria. From 12 to 22 October 2023, Israel launched at least three attacks on airports in Syria, particularly on Damascus and Aleppo. Notably, Israel carried out the assassination of Razi Mousavi, a senior Iranian general, in the Syrian capital of Damascus on 25 December 2023, and Brigadier General Sadegh Omidzadeh, an intelligence officer with the IRGC Quds Force, on 20 January 2024.

== Iranian consular building ==
The target of the attack was a five-storey consular building, which contained the residence of the Iranian ambassador to Syria. The building was next to the main Iranian embassy in Damascus. In front of the building was a plaque that read that the building belongs to the "consular section of the Iranian embassy". The Israeli attack destroyed the entire building. The Iranian ambassador survived, as he was in the building adjacent to his residence at the time of the attack.

Iranian Brigadier General Mohammad Reza Zahedi, was staying in this building at the time of the attack, along with two other commanders. The government of Syria has been inviting Iranian officers to serve as military advisors since 2011. Most embassies around the world host military and intelligence personnel. Analysts opined that the Iranian officers likely felt protected by international norms that prohibit attacks against diplomatic missions. Sources suggest that the Iranian officers were discussing "operational logistics and coordination", or may have been meeting with members from Palestinian Islamic Jihad.

=== Israeli claims ===
The attack was widely reported to have destroyed an Iranian consulate in Syria. However, the IDF said "I repeat, this is no consulate and this is no embassy. This is a military building of Quds forces disguised as a civilian building in Damascus." In response to similar Israeli claims France 24 published photos showing the building destroyed was indeed the Iranian consulate and part of Iran's embassy complex. Further, the building also housed the Iranian ambassador, although he wasn't home at the time and survived the attack. Chilean ambassador Jorge Heine pointed out that most embassies around the world host military and intelligence personnel ("Military attaché").

== Attack ==
On April 1, the Iranian consulate annex building (hosting the Iranian ambassador's residence) in the Iranian embassy complex in Damascus was destroyed by an Israeli airstrike. Iranian ambassador Hossein Akbari alleged that the consulate building "was targeted with six missiles from Israeli F-35 warplanes". The Guardian stated that Israeli warplanes were responsible for the attack. The New York Times (NYT) stated that four Israeli officials anonymously confirmed Israeli responsibility for the attack. Various other media outlets did not definitively attribute the attack to Israel, and the Israeli government refused to comment on the matter.

The suspected primary target of the attack was the Quds Force commander of the IRGC, Brigadier General Mohammad Reza Zahedi, who was killed in the attack. According to The Guardian, Zahedi was a critical figure in the relationship between Iran and Hezbollah.

Footage and photos from the consulate area after the attack showed extensive damage, fire, and smoke. Iranian media reported that the building had been completely destroyed and that the ambassador and his family, who were housed in the embassy next door, were unharmed.

The unused Canadian embassy building on the other side of the consular building was also damaged in the attack, with at least some of its windows destroyed. It has been closed since 2012 because of the Syrian civil war, but it is still owned by the Canadian government.

== Casualties ==
Sixteen were killed in total: seven Islamic Revolutionary Guard Corps (IRGC) soldiers, five Iran-backed militiamen, one Hezbollah fighter, one Iranian advisor, and two civilians (a Syrian woman and her child). In addition to Zahedi, the following Iranians were killed: Zahedi's deputy Brigadier General Mohammad Hadi Haji Rahimi, Hossein Aman Elahi, Sayid Mehdi Jalalati, Ali Agha Babaei, Sayid Ali Salehi Roozbahani, and Mohsen Sedaghat. Zahedi was the most senior IRGC officer to be killed since the assassination of Qasem Soleimani by the U.S. in January 2020. According to Bloomberg the IRGC command wing in Syria was eliminated in the strike.

== Analysis ==
Journalists Peter Beaumont and Emma Graham-Harrison of The Guardian wrote that the Israeli strike was a miscalculation that had "bulldozed through every red line to attack a location that Tehran maintains was tantamount to attacking Iranian soil."

Sanam Vakil, the director of the Middle East and North Africa programme at the Chatham House think tank, stated that the Damascus attack and the "breach" of the Vienna convention was "the straw that broke the camel's back."

== Legality ==
Diplomatic premises, like homes and schools, are considered "civilian objects" under international law.

Diplomatic buildings are entitled to further protections from attack or other interference by the host country under international customary law, codified in the 1961 Vienna Convention on Diplomatic Relations and the 1963 Convention on Consular Relations. However, the responsibilities under the Convention only apply to the host country, in this case Syria, with the Convention saying nothing about attacks by third states in foreign countries.

A UN-commissioned panel of experts on international law consisting of Ben Saul, Morris Tidball-Binz, Javaid Rehman, Livingstone Sewanyana, and Cecilia M. Bailliet wrote that Israel had provided no legal justification for the attack, and had failed to report it to the United Nations Security Council. Therefore, in their view, it violated Article 2(4) banning recourse to force against another state. They also issued a warning that the Israeli officials involved in the strike might have committed crimes. The subsequent Iranian retaliation was also, in their view, prohibited under international law, since self-defense is only justified to deter continuing armed attacks, and the strike on the Iranian Embassy had ended 12 days earlier.

Aurel Sari, a professor of international law at Exeter University, argued that as a third state, Israel "is not bound by the law of diplomatic relations with regard to Iran's Embassy in Syria," however "unless Israel was able to justify the airstrike as an act of self-defense" it would be in violation of Article 2(4) of the United Nations Charter. Whether self-defense can justify an attack on the territory of a third country is a subject of academic debate.

== Reactions ==
=== International ===
Countries that condemned the Israeli attacks on the Iranian embassy. Countries that expressed concern. Countries that expressed concern and called for more investigation.

Official entities from many countries condemned the attack and considered it a violation of the international laws, including the Prime Minister of Iraq, the Prime Minister of Spain, the President of Nicaragua, and the foreign ministries of Afghanistan, Algeria, Armenia, Brazil, Belarus, China, Cuba, Egypt, Indonesia, Jordan, Italy, Kazakhstan, Kuwait, Lebanon, Libya, Malaysia, Maldives, Mauritania, Norway, Oman, Pakistan, Qatar, Russia (which called it a "political killing"), Saudi Arabia, South Africa, Sierra Leone, Tajikistan, Tunisia, Turkey, United Arab Emirates, Uzbekistan, Venezuela, Vietnam, as well as the Spokesperson for Yemen's Ansar Allah. The Foreign Ministry of Kyrgyzstan expressed concern.

The spokesperson for the UN Secretary-General condemned the attack on 1 April.

Russia requested the UN Security Council to discuss the strike. A statement condemning the attack was drafted by Russia to be issued by the Security Council, but the Western member states opposed the issuance of any statement. During the briefing in the United Nations Security Council, the representatives of many countries (such as Ecuador, Guyana, Slovenia, South Korea, and Switzerland) noted that any attack on diplomatic and consular premises violates the Charter of the United Nations as well as the 1961 Vienna Convention on Diplomatic Relations and the 1963 Vienna Convention on Consular Relations. They also expressed concern that the incident could further escalate the regional conflict. The representative of Japan only expressed concern, and the representative of the United Kingdom noted the importance of "respect ... for diplomatic premises", but also criticized Iran. The spokesman of the United States National Security Council only stated that the US was not involved and had no prior knowledge of the attack. Israel had notified the US in advance that it would be operating in Syria, but did not identify the target. The Representative of Russia criticized the statements made by the US and others including France, considering them to be double standard.

United States officials said Israel had notified the US in advance that it would be operating in Syria, but did not identify the target. A Pentagon spokesperson said Israel had provided no advance warning of the strike.

The Arab League, the European Union, the Gulf Cooperation Council (GCC), the Organisation of Islamic Cooperation (OIC), as well as the Shanghai Cooperation Organisation (SCO) also condemned the attack.

=== Israel ===
The Israeli military spokesman claimed that the building was neither a consulate nor an embassy, but a military building of Quds forces "disguised as a civilian structure in Damascus". Israel told the U.S. that a retaliatory attack by Iran would prompt a robust response from Israel.

Seven Israeli embassies were evacuated in response to the potential threat of an Iranian retaliatory attack, after Iran publicly blamed Israel and vowed retaliation. The IDF deployed GPS jamming systems within Tel Aviv to safeguard against potential aerial attacks by Iran. Initial U.S. intelligence anticipated a significant attack on U.S. or Israeli assets as soon as the week of 8–12 April.

=== Iran ===
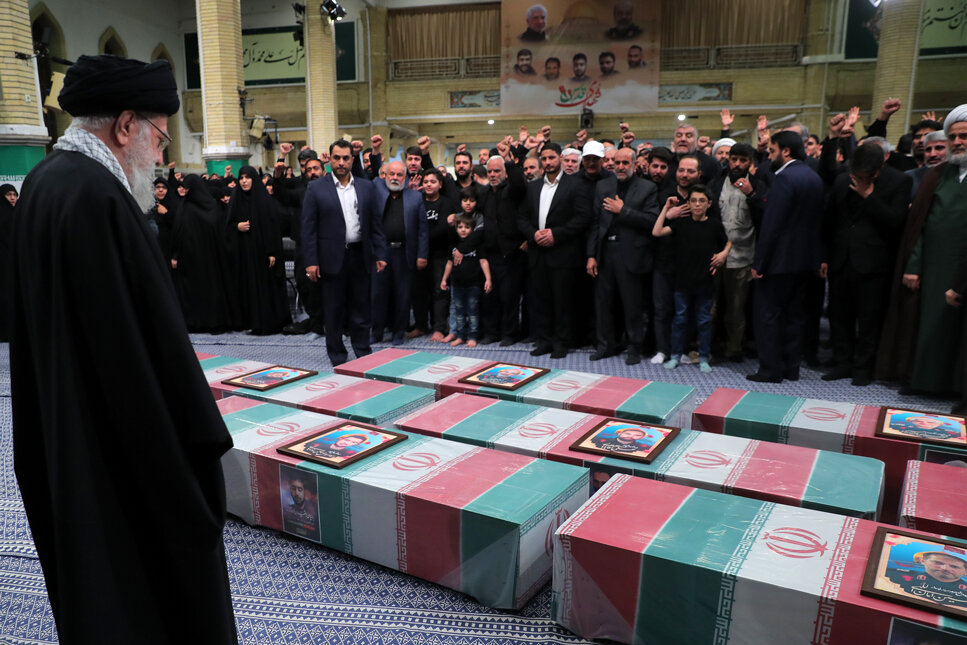
Ali Khamenei leading the funeral for the IRGC soldiers on 4 April

In several cities across Iran, including the capital, Tehran, as well as Tabriz and Isfahan, large crowds of protesters gathered waving Palestinian and Iranian flags and demanding revenge. The Iranian Supreme Leader Ali Khamenei vowed a harsh response to the attack. Khamenei's political advisor Ali Shamkhani, said that the United States remains directly responsible. Iran also sent a letter to the United Nations Security Council, saying it "reserves its legitimate and inherent right to respond decisively". Syria's Foreign Minister condemned the attack, calling it a terrorist attack.

On 5 April 2024, Iran told the United States to "step aside" as it prepared for retaliation against Israel. On 13 April 2024, the Iranian military launched its Operation True Promise, attacking Israel from its own soil for the first time, firing more than 300 standoff weapons at Israel, including at least 170 aerial drones, 30 cruise missiles, and 120 ballistic missiles. The attack, which constituted the largest single drone attack in history, was described as a success by Iran and as a failure by Israel, the latter saying that its air defenses, buttressed by those of allies, destroyed almost all the incoming weapons before they could reach their targets. That same day, the IRGC Navy boarded and seized Portuguese container ship MSC Aries in the Strait of Hormuz via helicopter, claiming it as "linked to Israel" and "violating maritime laws". On 18 April, 16 shipping associations sent a joint letter to the United Nations requesting every effort to release the captive crew of MSC Aries, and for "enhanced military presence, missions and patrols in the region to protect seafarers",

== See also ==
- 1992 Buenos Aires Israeli embassy bombing, Iranian government and Hezbollah found responsible by Argentine court
- 1994 AMIA bombing in Buenos Aires (85 dead), part of Iran–Israel proxy conflict
- 2020 Assassination of Qasem Soleimani by the USA
- Defense Attaché System - practice of hosting military personnel at US embassies
