= St. Nikolas =

St. Nikolas can refer to:

- Church of St. Nicholas, Kumanovo, a church in North Macedonia.
- St Nikolas, an oil tanker previously named Suez Rajan, which was boarded and seized by Iran.

== See also ==
- Saint Nicholas, the Christian saint associated with Santa Claus.
