= 2024 Iran–Israel conflict =

Middle East armed conflict

- Part of the Iran–Israel conflict and Middle Eastern crisis
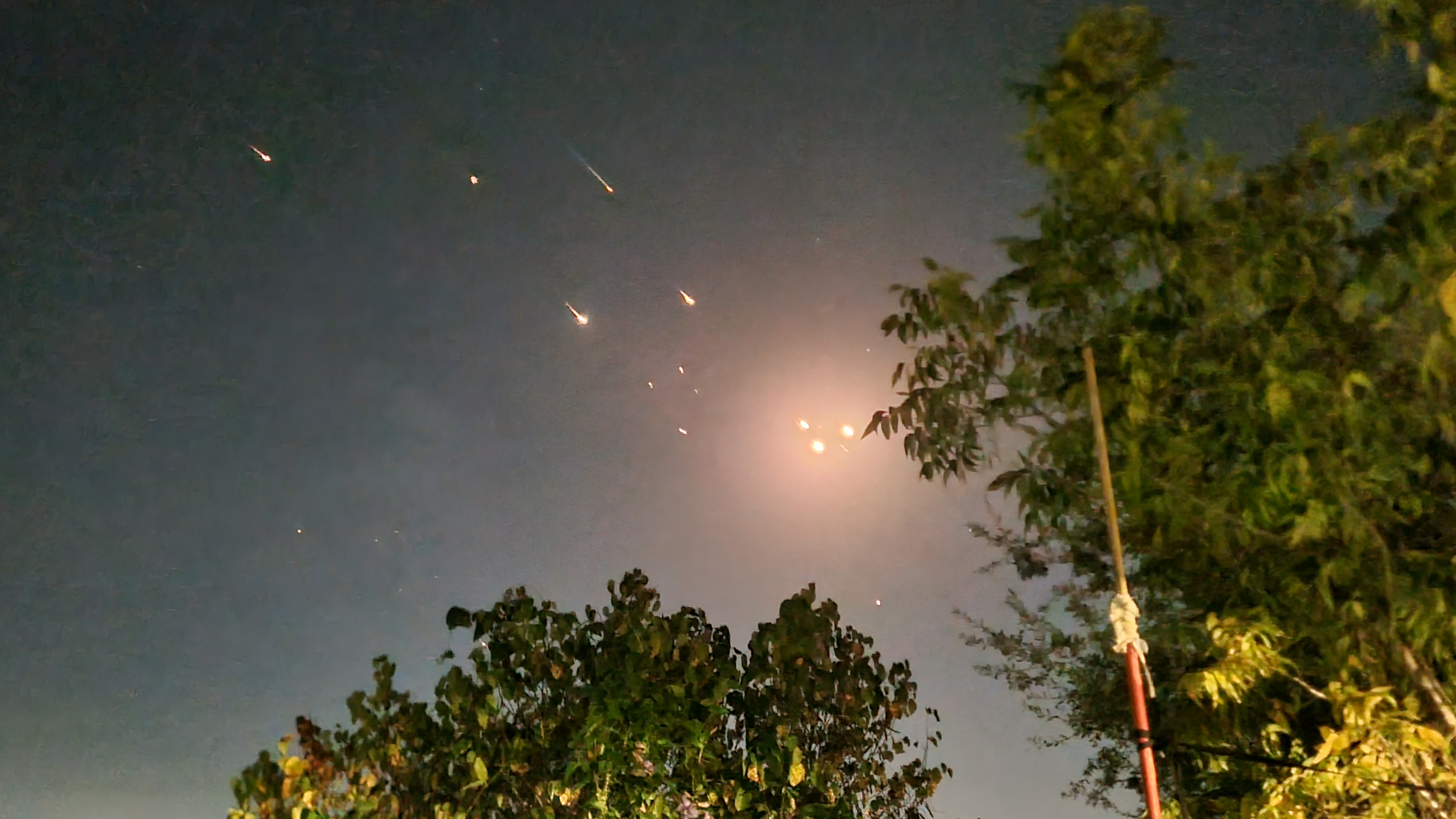
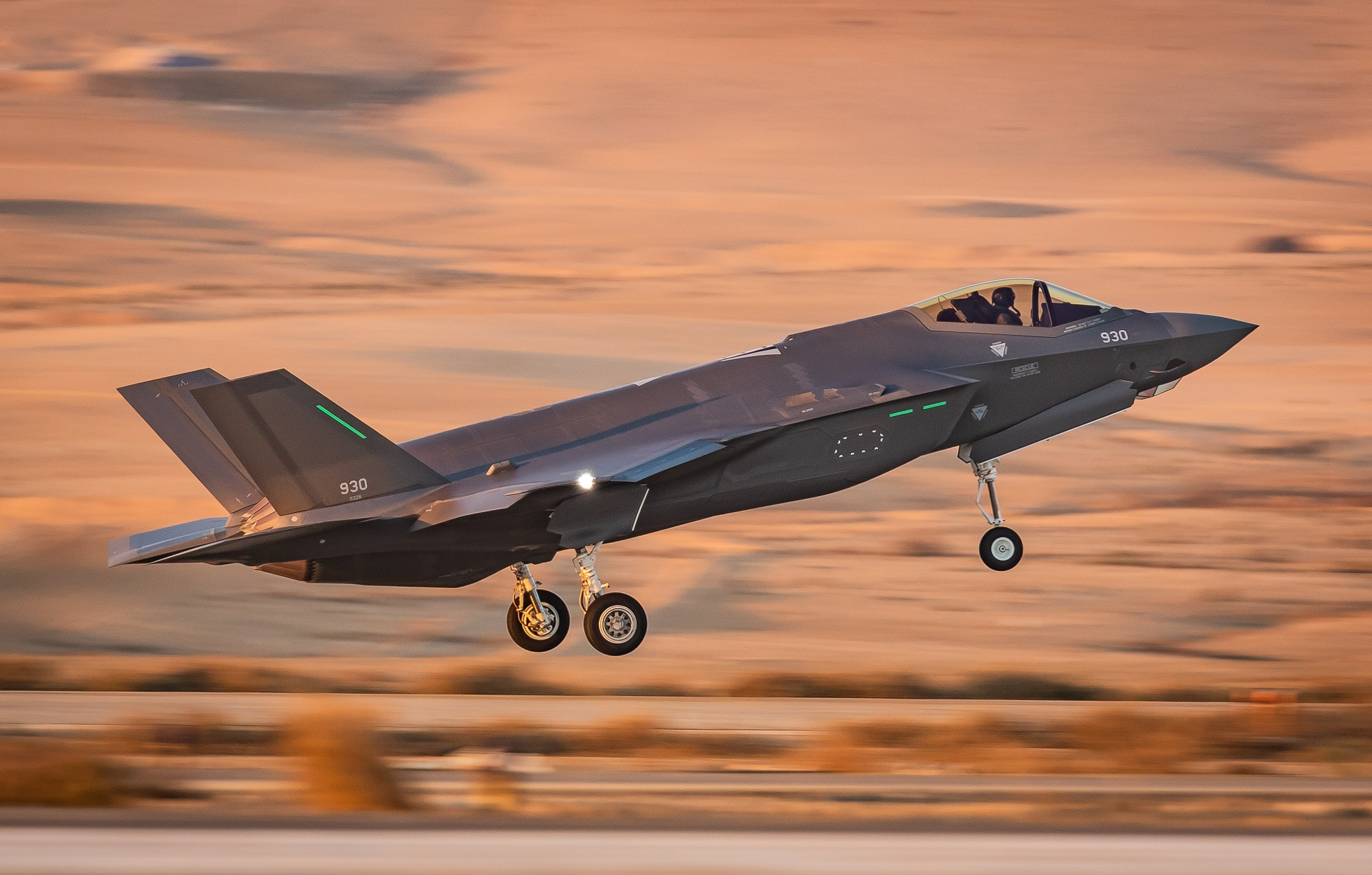
- Missile interceptions in Lower Galilee, Israel, during the strikes on Israel, 1 October; An IDF F-35I Adir departs from a military base in Israel to attack Iran during the strikes on Iran, 26 October
Date	1 April – 26 October 2024 (Note: First phase: 1–19 April 2024 (18 days) Second phase: 31 July – 26 October 2024 (2 months and 26 days)) (6 months, 3 weeks and 4 days)
Location	Iran; Iraq; Israel; Syria; West Bank; Lebanon; Jordan; Yemen; Red Sea; Mediterranean Sea; Strait of Hormuz
Result	Prelude to the Twelve-Day War

Belligerents
Israel; Supported by: United States; United Kingdom; France; Intelligence: Saudi Arabia; United Arab Emirates	Iran; Supported by: Axis of Resistance: Syria; Houthis; Hezbollah; Islamic Resistance in Iraq; Badr Organization; True Promise Corps

Commanders and leaders
Benjamin Netanyahu; Israel Katz; Herzi Halevi; Tomer Bar; Joe Biden; Lloyd Austin; Michael Kurilla; Alexus Grynkewich; Derek France; Keir Starmer; John Healey; Rishi Sunak; Grant Shapps; Emmanuel Macron; Michel Barnier; Sébastien Lecornu; Gabriel Attal	Ali Khamenei; Masoud Pezeshkian; Ebrahim Raisi; Mohammad-Reza Gharaei Ashtiani; Aziz Nasirzadeh; Mohammad Bagheri; Abdolrahim Mousavi; Alireza Sabahifard; Hossein Salami; Amir Ali Hajizadeh; Bashar al-Assad; Ali Abbas; Ali Tawfiq Samra; Abdul-Malik al-Houthi; Naim Qassem; Hassan Nasrallah X; Ahmad al-Hamidawi; Hadi al-Amiri; Muhammad Hamza al-Tamimi

Units involved
Israel Defense Forces; Israeli Air Force; Air Defense Command; Home Front Command; United States Armed Forces; United States Army; Erbil Patriot battery; United States Navy; USS Arleigh Burke; USS Carney; United States Air Force; 379th Air Expeditionary Wing; CENTCOM; (United Kingdom) British Armed Forces; CDS; Royal Air Force; RAF Akrotiri; (France) French Armed Forces; French Navy; French Air and Space Force; Royal Saudi Armed Forces (claimed); Royal Saudi Air Defense	Iranian Armed Forces; Islamic Republic of Iran Army; Air Defense Force; Islamic Revolutionary Guard Corps; Navy; Aerospace force; Quds Force; Syrian Armed Forces; SAADF; Hezbollah's military wing; (Hezbollah) Radwan Force; Yemeni Armed Forces (SPC)

Casualties and losses
Israel: 1 Israeli civilian dead (indirectly); 35 Israeli civilians injured	Iran: 13 killed (Note: including 7 Islamic Revolutionary Guard Corps soldiers, 4 Iranian Army officers killed, 1 Iranian security guard killed, and 1 Iranian advisor); Lebanon: 5 Iran-backed militiamen; 1 Hezbollah fighter
- 2 Syrian civilians killed 2 Jordanian civilians injured (by shrapnel)

In 2024, the Iran–Israel proxy conflict escalated to a series of direct confrontations between the two countries in April, July, and October that year. On 1 April, Israel bombed an Iranian consulate complex in Damascus, Syria, killing multiple senior Iranian officials. In response, Iran and its Axis of Resistance allies seized the Israeli-linked ship MSC Aries and launched strikes inside Israel on 13 April. Syria shot down some Israeli interceptors, and Iranian proxies in the region also attacked Israel. The United States, United Kingdom, France, and Jordan intercepted Iranian drones to defend Israel. Israel then carried out retaliatory strikes in Iran and Syria on 19 April. Analysts said these April Israeli strikes were limited and signaled a desire to de-escalate, as did the Iranian reaction.

On 31 July, Hamas political leader Ismail Haniyeh was assassinated, in Tehran, Iran. The killing of Haniyeh occurred a few hours after the 2024 Haret Hreik airstrike in Lebanon that assassinated Hezbollah commander Fuad Shukr.

On 1 October, Iran launched a series of missiles at Israel. Israel then carried out more retaliatory strikes against Iran on 26 October. Several months later in June 2025, the Iran–Israel Twelve-Day war began when Israel launched a surprise attack targeting key Iranian military and nuclear facilities.

== Background ==
After the Iranian Revolution in 1979, the Government of Iran took a more critical stance on Israel, and a proxy war emerged as Iran supported Lebanese Shia and Palestinian militants during the 1982 Lebanon War. Iran began to gain power and influence with other Islamist countries and groups in the Middle East, collectively named the "Axis of Resistance". The conflict evolved with Israeli attempts to stop the Iranian nuclear program and confrontations during the Syrian civil war.

=== Previous tensions during the Gaza war ===
On 7 October 2023, Hamas, a Palestinian militant group partially funded by Iran, launched an attack on Israel resulting in the deaths of almost 1,200 Israelis, mostly civilians, and the outbreak of the Gaza war. Israel also skirmished with Iranian proxy Hezbollah in Lebanon. After the attack, Israel began targeting Iranian and proxy troops in Syria more frequently as retaliation. Fears of a regional war grew in the following months.

On 25 December, Razi Mousavi, an Iranian commander, was killed in a targeted Israeli airstrike at his residence in Sayyidah Zaynab, 10 km (6 mi) south of Damascus, amid the Gaza war. Mousavi's assassination marked the highest-ranking killing of a senior Iranian military official since the targeted assassination of Qasem Soleimani, until the subsequent killing of Mohammad Reza Zahedi in 2024.

On 20 January 2024, Iranian general Sadegh Omidzadeh and four other Iranian officials (Ali Aghazadeh, Saeed Karimi, Hossein Mohammadi, and Mohammad Amin Samadi) were killed during a meeting at a building in the Mezzeh district of Damascus. The Israeli airstrikes, as reported by the Syrian Observatory for Human Rights, resulted in the complete destruction of the building, leading to the death of at least 10 military personnel.

=== Shipping ===
Since 2019, Iran has engaged in heightened naval action against European, American and Israeli shipping, persistently attacking various vessels and seizing ships amidst political issues, dubbed "piracy" by Israeli outlets in 2023.

== April 2024 ==
=== Israeli bombing of Iranian embassy (1 April) ===
On 1 April, Israel bombed the Iranian embassy in Damascus, Syria. The attack killed 16 people, including multiple Iranian officers and proxy fighters. Most notably, Mohammad Reza Zahedi, a commander for the Quds Force was killed in the airstrike. Iranian officials in the building were allegedly meeting with Palestinian militant leaders at the time of the attack.

The airstrike killed 16 people, including 7 officers of the Islamic Revolutionary Guard Corps (IRGC). United States president Joe Biden warned Iran not to escalate the situation.

Iran vowed to respond, and Western sources suspected it would directly attack Israel. Israel began preparing in the days leading up to the attack, evacuating Israeli embassies and jamming GPS signals in the case of an aerial bombing. France deployed its navy to defend Israel. Saudi Arabia and the United Arab Emirates provided Israel with intelligence on the strikes.

=== Seizure of the MSC Aries (13 April) ===
On 13 April 2024, Iran's Revolutionary Guards seized MSC Aries, a Portuguese-registered and Madeira-flagged container ship owned by Gortal Shipping and leased to Mediterranean Shipping Company (MSC), which Iran claimed was linked to Israel. The ship, with a crew of 25 people, was boarded by Iranian commandos in the Strait of Hormuz, within international waters off the coast of the United Arab Emirates, and taken to Iranian waters, effectively imprisoning the crew.

The Iranian military subsequently took the ship and its crew to Iranian waters. The crew members onboard comprised 17 Indians, four Filipinos, two Pakistanis, one Russian and one Estonian national.

Following the incident, the Israeli foreign minister Israel Katz called on the European Union to sanction the IRGC. The seizure of the ship occurred in international waters near the UAE coast. The Israeli foreign minister called the Iranian action an act of international piracy, in alignment with international law.

Joe Biden shortened his vacation and returned to the White House for "security consultations," and defence secretary Lloyd Austin called the Israeli defence minister, Yoav Gallant, and said Israel can rely on the United States. On 18 April, 16 shipping associations sent a joint letter to the United Nations requesting every effort to release the captive crew of MSC Aries, and for "enhanced military presence, missions and patrols in the region to protect seafarers".

On 27 April, the Iranian Foreign Minister Hossein Amirabdollahian announced that the 24 remaining crew of MSC Aries being held were given access to their respective consulates, and would be released. On 3 May, he announced that the crew was released, but the vessel remained under the control of Iran.

==== MSC Aries ====
History
- Name: MSC Aries
- Owner: Gortal Shipping
- Operator: Mediterranean Shipping Company
- Port of registry: Madeira, Portugal
- Completed: 2020
- Identification: IMO number: 9857169; MMSI number: 255806335

General characteristics
- Tonnage: 149,525 GT
- Length: 366 m (1,200 ft 9 in)
- Beam: 51 m (167 ft 4 in)

MSC Aries is a container ship built in 2020. As of 2024 the ship is Portuguese-registered and Madeira-flagged. She has a length of 366 metres (1,200 ft 9 in) and a beam of 51 metres (167 ft 4 in). It has a 149,525 gross tonnage (GT) and a summer tonnage of 158,097 tons deadweight (DWT). The ship is leased from Gortal Shipping Inc., a British Virgin Islands affiliate of Zodiac Maritime, and operated by Mediterranean Shipping Company (MSC). The Iranian foreign ministry claimed that the ship was undoubtedly linked to Israel, as Zodiac is partially owned by an Israeli businessman.

=== Iranian strikes on Israel (13–14 April) ===
Early on 13 April, Hezbollah attacked northern Israel with around 40 rockets. Israel responded by bombing a Hezbollah weapons manufacturing site in Lebanon. Al Jazeera said the attack was significant given the conflict, and the Institute for the Study of War suggested the strikes were coordinated with Iran.

Later, Iran and its proxies attacked Israel with about 300 drones and multiple ballistic missiles. The Houthis, Islamic Resistance in Iraq, Badr Organization, and True Promise Corps also launched attacks on Israel under Iranian command. Syria shot down some Israeli interceptors. The United States, United Kingdom, and Jordan intercepted over 100 Iranian drones. The attack caused minor damage to Nevatim Airbase, which remained operational. A 7-year-old Israeli Bedouin child was critically injured by a missile shrapnel, and 31 other civilians suffered minor injuries while rushing to shelters or due to anxiety.

Israeli and U.S. officials conducted situational assessments that night. The United States said it would not participate in a retaliatory strike on Iran. Iran threatened that if Israel were to retaliate, directly or indirectly, it would strike back harder. Israel said the attack warranted a response. The United States warned Israel to exercise restraint, and the Israeli war cabinet argued over the scale of Israel's response. Israel delayed plans to start an offensive in Rafah that week so it could determine a response.

The war cabinet continued arguments over the Israeli response during the following week. The cabinet considered military and diplomatic options, with international pressure to de-escalate the situation influencing decisions. On 18 April, it was reported that the United States would greenlight a Rafah offensive in exchange for no Israeli strike on Iran. The U.S. and EU tightened sanctions on Iran.

=== Israeli response (19 April) ===
On the morning of 19 April, Israel retaliated against Iran. Israel attacked three targets in or near Isfahan International Airport, including a military base. One of the targets was a radar for the Natanz nuclear site. Iran claimed that its air defense shot down all Israeli projectiles and that the explosions were from air defense, but satellite images showed a damaged air defense battery and damage to the radar system. Israel did not comment or claim responsibility for any attack. In southern Syria, SAA bases were targeted, leading to material losses. Explosions and fighter jets were also heard in Iraq, and debris from an Israeli missile was found in central Iraq, suggesting Israel fired from there.

Iranian state media downplayed the Israeli strike, and Iranian officials said there was no planned retaliation. An anonymous source told CNN that direct state-to-state strikes were over. Analysts said the attack and Iranian reaction showed that both sides wanted to de-escalate.

== July–October 2024 ==
=== Assassinations of Shukr and Haniyeh (31 July) ===
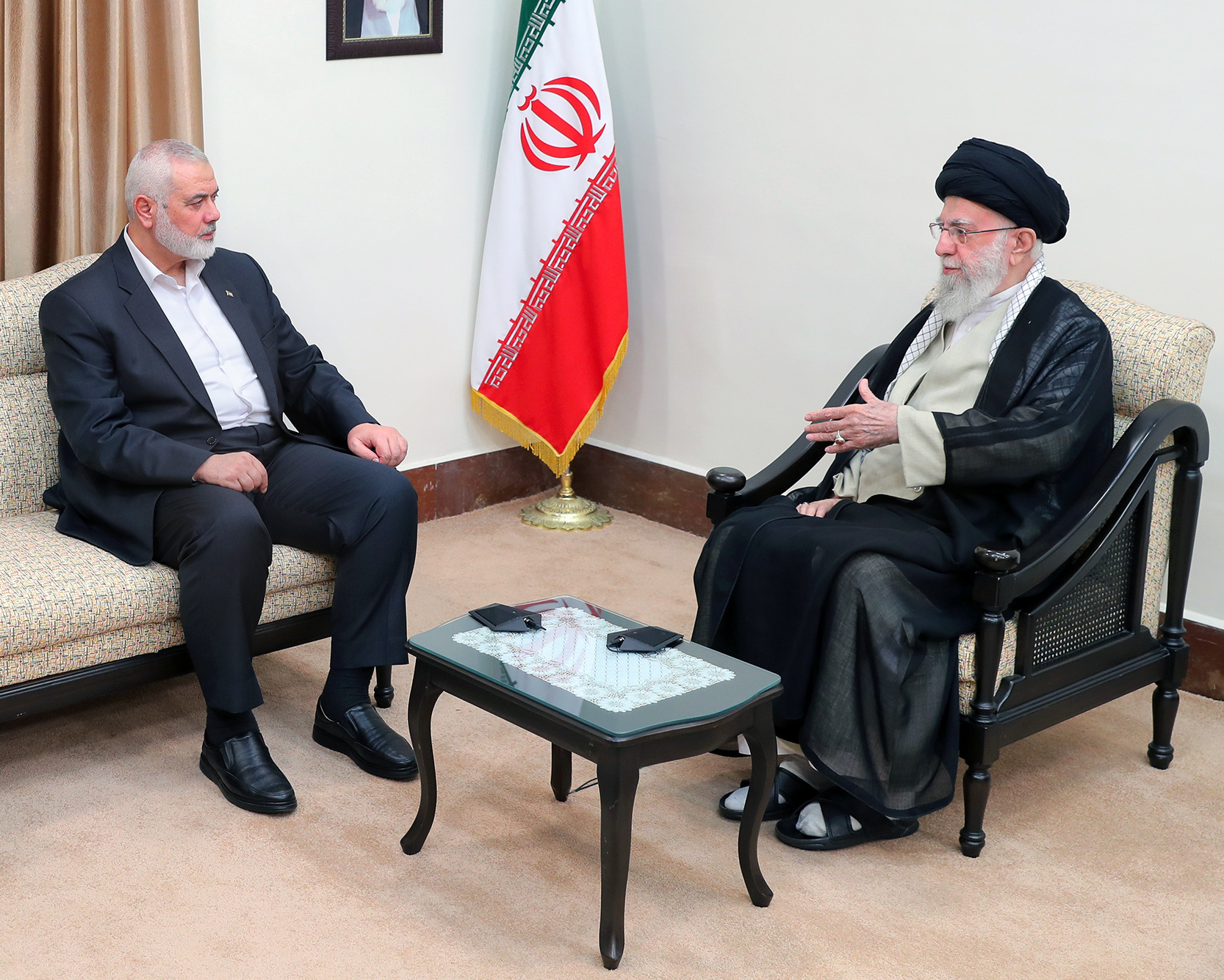
Ismail Haniyeh (left) with the Supreme Leader of Iran Ali Khamenei (right) hours before his death on 31 July 2024

On 31 July, Fuad Shukr, a senior Hezbollah commander was assassinated in an Israeli strike on Haret Hreik, in the suburbs of the Lebanese capital Beirut. Iranian military adviser Milad Bedi and civilians were also killed in the strike. The strike was retaliation for the Majdal Shams attack, which killed twelve children, that Israel claimed Shukr had ordered.

Later that day, Ismail Haniyeh, the political leader of Hamas, was assassinated along with his personal bodyguard in the Iranian capital Tehran by an apparent Israeli attack. Haniyeh was killed in his accommodation in a military-run guesthouse after attending the inauguration ceremony for Iranian president Masoud Pezeshkian.

=== Heightened tensions (August–September) ===
After the attacks, Iran and Hezbollah pledged retaliation. According to Israeli reports, retaliatory attacks are likely to be launched by multiple members of the Axis of Resistance, including in Lebanon, Gaza, Iraq, Syria and Yemen, as similarly done in the coordinated attack on Israel in April 2024. Many countries warned their citizens to leave Lebanon because of increasing war tensions.

The U.S. State Department has been trying to prevent an attack by working through diplomats to send the message to Iran that escalation of the conflict is not in their best interests, and that the U.S. will defend Israel from attacks. Other U.S. officials stated that the successful shoot-down in April relied on good military intelligence about what Iran was planning, but this time the military situation is more uncertain. Russian President Vladimir Putin sent a message to Iran's Supreme leader Ayatollah Ali Khamenei through Sergei Shoigu, the secretary of Russia's security council, to have a restrained response, and not to attack Israeli civilians.

The United States military announced the deployment of an additional squadron of F-22 Raptors from the 1st Operations Group of the 1st Fighter Wing; 4,000 marines and 12 ships were deployed to the region (Note: including the USS Theodore Roosevelt (CVN-71), Carrier Air Wing Eleven and six destroyers of the Destroyer Squadron 23 (the USS John S. McCain (DDG-56), USS Russell (DDG-59), USS Chafee (DDG-90), USS Pinckney (DDG-91), USS Halsey (DDG-97), and USS Daniel Inouye (DDG-118))) as a part of Carrier Strike Group 9 in the Persian Gulf and three Wasp-class amphibious assault ships, (Note: (including the USS Wasp (LHD-1), USS New York (LPD-21) and a third ship)) two destroyers (Note: (the USS Bulkeley (DDG-84) and USS Roosevelt (DDG-80))) and the 26th Marine Expeditionary Unit as a part of the USS Wasp amphibious ready group in the eastern Mediterranean Sea. The Carrier Strike Group 3 including USS Abraham Lincoln (CVN-72) and an unspecified number of cruisers and destroyers along with Carrier Air Wing Nine was also deployed, sent from the Pacific Ocean.

On 5 August 2024, NOTAMs were issued to warn pilots regarding the closure or restriction of the airspace of Iran and Jordan, a precaution related to a possible attack by Iran against Israel.

=== Iranian strikes on Israel (1 October) ===
On 1 October 2024, Iran launched around 200 ballistic missiles towards Israel in two waves. Iranian officials cited the recent assassinations of Hezbollah, Hamas, and IRGC leaders as justification.

=== Israeli strikes on Iran (26 October) ===
On 26 October 2024, Israel began attacking Iran, with explosions heard near Imam Khomeini International Airport, Mashhad, Karaj, Kermanshah, Zanjan. Explosions were also heard near Damascus, Syria.

== Aftermath ==
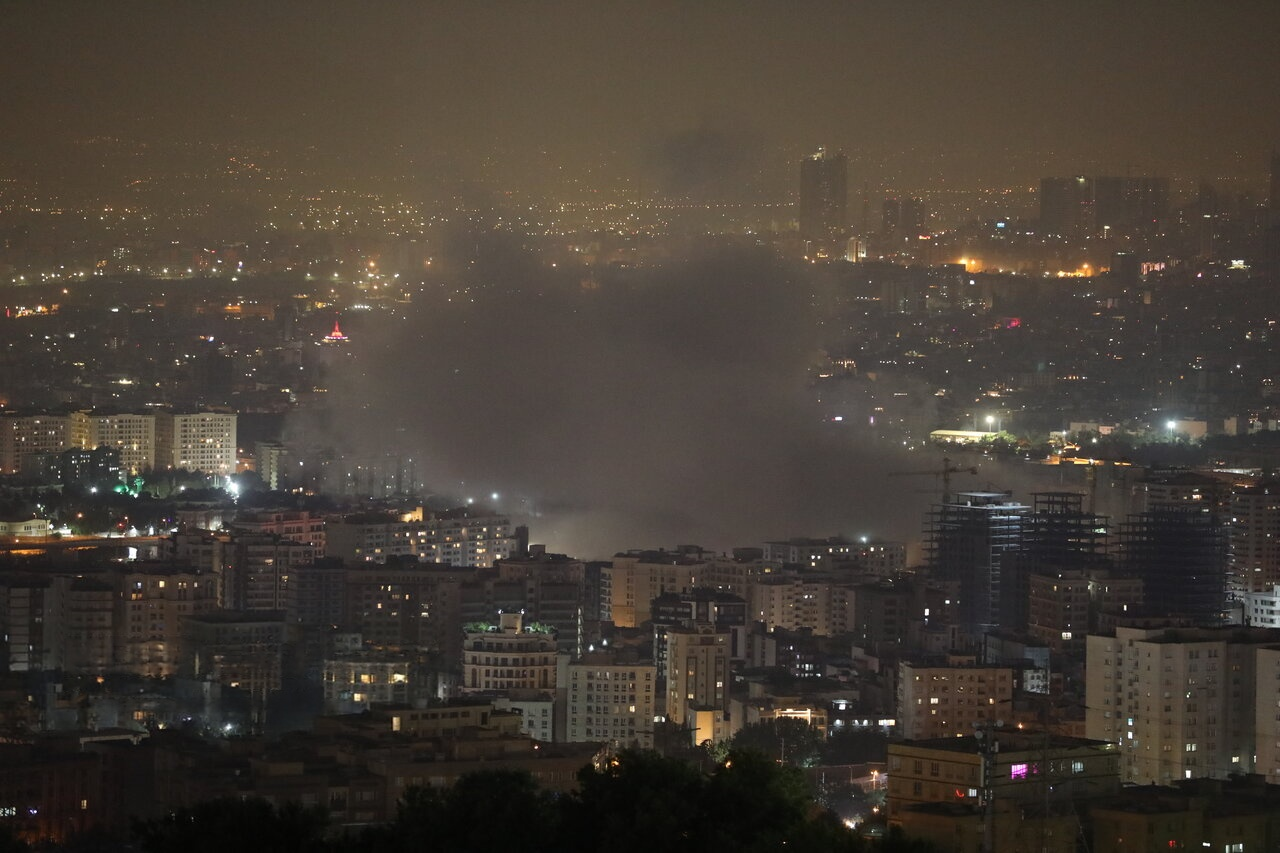
Aerial view of Tehran following Israeli airstrikes, 13 June 2025

On 31 October 2024, Iranian Supreme Leader Ali Khamenei ordered his military officials to prepare for a military response against Israel, with Iranian officials warning that the response to Israel's strikes would be 'harsh' and 'unimaginable'. On the same day, Israeli intelligence suggested that Iran prepared to respond to Israel's attack from within Iraqi territory. Axios reported that the attack would consist of a large number of drones and ballistic missiles launched from Iraqi territory.

In November 2024, Israeli news outlets began reporting that Israel may target the Islamic Resistance in Iraq for its campaign against Israel during its wars on Gaza and on Lebanon. Unnamed officials allegedly told outlets that satellites monitored the transfer of ballistic missiles and related equipment from Iran to Iraqi territory.

On 19 November, Israel issued a letter to the UN Security Council asserting its right to self-defense against the Islamic Resistance in Iraq for its military campaign on Israel during its wars on Gaza and Lebanon. Iraqi Prime Minister Mohammed Shia al-Sudani warned that the letter served as pretext for an attack on Iraq, aligning with Israel's efforts to expand the war in the region.

The Israeli security threat towards Iraq caused the Iraqi government to issue a statement that it would take all necessary diplomatic and military actions to protect its sovereignty. On 21 November, the Iraqi government requested an emergency session of the Arab League Council through the Iraqi Permanent Mission to the Arab League to address the Israeli threats against Iraq. The request highlighted Israel's threats in its letter to the UN Security Council, where it sought to expand its aggression in the region to Iraq.

=== 2025 Twelve-Day War ===
On 13 June 2025, the conflict escalated into the armed conflict between Israel and Iran, when Israel launched a surprise attack targeting key Iranian military and nuclear facilities. The opening hours of the war saw targeted assassinations and attempted assassinations of Iran's top military leaders, nuclear scientists, and politicians (including Ali Shamkhani, who was overseeing nuclear talks with the U.S.), airstrikes on nuclear and military facilities, and destruction of Iran's air defenses. Iran retaliated by launching missiles at military sites and cities in Israel. The United States, which had been defending Israel since the beginning of the war by shooting down Iranian missiles and drones, took offensive action on 22 June 2025, by striking three Iranian nuclear sites. In response, the Houthis in Yemen considered the American strikes a "declaration of war" and have fired several missiles at Israel. On 24 June, Israel and Iran agreed to a ceasefire after insistence from the U.S.

==== Responses ====

Reactions to the 2025 Twelve-Day War:

Countries that condemned the Israeli attack.
Countries that expressed concern.
Countries that supported Israel.
