= 2023 in Iran =

- Decades: 2000s; 2010s; 2020s
- See also: Other events of 2023; Years in Iran

Events in the year 2023 in Iran.

== Incumbents ==
- Supreme Leader of Iran: Ali Khamenei
- President of Iran: Ebrahim Raisi
- Speaker of the Parliament: Mohammad Bagher Ghalibaf
- Chief Justice: Gholam-Hossein Mohseni-Eje'i

== Events ==
=== January ===
- 18 January – At least 150 people are injured by a magnitude 5.8 earthquake in Khoy, Khoy County, West Azerbaijan.
- 19 January – Iran and South Korea summon each other's ambassadors in a deepening dispute between the countries, after South Korean President Yoon Suk-yeol called Iran "the enemy of the United Arab Emirates" while addressing South Korean troops stationed there.
- 24 January – Two police officers are killed and a third is injured in an attack in Sistan and Baluchestan province.
- 27 January – Attack on the Azerbaijani Embassy in Tehran: A guard is killed and two others are injured during a shooting at the Azerbaijani embassy in Tehran. The perpetrator is arrested.
- 28 January – Drone attacks were reported across Iran.

=== February ===
- 23 February – Iran publicly acknowledges the International Atomic Energy Agency accusation it has enriched uranium to 84%, bringing it close to developing a nuclear weapon. The Iranian government maintains its nuclear program is "completely peaceful".

=== April ===
- 3 April – Two people are killed after heavy rain causes flash flooding across Iran.
- 8 April – Police in Iran announce the installment of cameras in public places to identify and penalize women who do not observe dressing codes for hijabs, while also urging citizens to confront women who are not sufficiently covered.
- 20 April – An Iranian Navy commander claims on state television that the Iranian Navy forced a U.S. submarine to surface as it transited the Strait of Hormuz and that the submarine violated Iranian territorial waters. The U.S. denies the Iranian claims.
- 24 April – Iranian workers in major industries continue their strike for a third day.
- 26 April
  - Iranian ayatollah and Assembly of Experts member Abbas-Ali Soleimani is assassinated in a shooting at a bank in Babolsar, Mazandaran province. The perpetrator, a security guard at the bank, has been arrested by police.
  - Six Iranian demonstrators are injured in clashes in Fanuj, Sistan and Baluchistan province, after a teenager was killed when his motorcycle collided with a police car.
- 30 April – Iran evacuates 65 nationals from Sudan with Saudi Arabian assistance.

=== May ===
- 19 May – Three men are executed in Iran. The three men were accused of "moharebeh" ("waging war against God"), killing three security officials in Isfahan in November, and for alleged cooperation with the MEK. According to human rights organizations, the men were denied due process, and were tortured and forced into televised confessions.
- 22 May – Five Iranian border guards are killed and two others are injured in Saravan, Sistan and Baluchestan province, during a confrontation with an armed group at the border with Pakistan.

=== June ===
- 1 June – A terrorist attack at the Iran–Pakistan border kills two Pakistani border patrol officers.
- 18 June – Fourteen people die from drinking bootleg alcohol in Alborz province.

=== July ===
- 15 July – State media reports morality police will resume headscarf patrols.

=== September ===
- 3 September – Foreign Minister Hossein Amir-Abdollahian says that Iran has started talks to revive the Joint Comprehensive Plan of Action.
- 16 September – Human rights organizations say that Iranian police arrested the father of Mahsa Amini on the first anniversary of her death.
- 18 September – Iran announced that a prisoner swap will take place today with the United States. Under the agreement, Iran will also have access to 6 billion dollars frozen in South Korea.

=== November ===
- 3 November – Langarud drug rehabilitation center fire: Thirty-two people are killed and 16 others are hospitalized following a fire at a drug rehabilitation center in Langarud, Gilan.

=== December ===
- 14 December – Jaish ul-Adl militants attack a police station in Rask, Sistan and Baluchestan province, killing eleven officers and wounding others. Several gunmen are also killed in the ensuing shootout.
- 16 December – Iran executes an alleged Mossad agent in Sistan and Baluchistan province.
- 18 December – Roughly half of Iranian national petrol stations are disrupted by cyberattacks. Iranian state media reports that the Israeli-linked Predator Sparrow group claims responsibility.
- 25 December – High-ranking Iranian general Sayyed Razi Mousavi is killed in an Israeli airstrike in Syria.
- 29 December – Four people are executed by hanging in West Azerbaijan province, after being convicted for links to Israel’s Mossad spy agency.

== Deaths ==
- 7 January
  - Mohammad Mehdi Karami, 21
  - Seyyed Mohammad Hosseini, 39
- 7 June – The Iron Sheik, 81
- 9 June - Firouz Naderi, 77
