= Sadegh Omidzadeh =

Iranian general (died 2024)

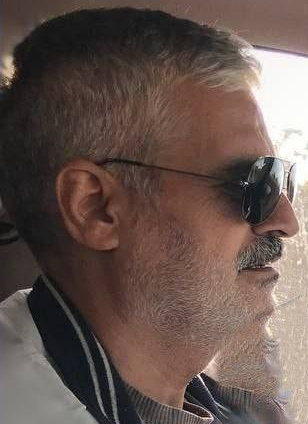
- Died: 20 January 2024; Mezzeh, Damascus, Syria
- Cause of death: Israeli airstrike
- Military career
- Allegiance: Iran
- Branch: Islamic Revolutionary Guard Corps
- Rank: Brigadier general
- Conflicts: Syrian Civil War; Iran–Israel conflict during the Syrian civil war; Iran–Israel proxy conflict; Israel–Hezbollah conflict (2023–2024); 2024 Iran–Israel conflict

Sadegh Omidzadeh (Persian: صادق امیدزاده; died 20 January 2024), also known as Hojatollah Omidvar (Persian: حجت الله امیدوار), was an Iranian general and head of the Quds Force intelligence unit in Syria. He was killed in Damascus by an Israeli airstrike.

== Military career ==
On 14 August 2012, Omidzadeh, along with other Iranian officials, was captured by Syrian opposition groups in the vicinity of Damascus airport. Subsequently, he was released following mediation efforts by Qatar. In June 2023, reports surfaced indicating that Omidzadeh was planning attacks on American forces in Syria. His specific focus involved targeting U.S. Humvee and Cougar armored vehicles within Syrian territory.

== Death ==
On 20 January 2024, Omidzadeh, along with four other Iranian officials, Ali Aghazadeh, Saeed Karimi, Hossein Mohammadi, and Mohammad Amin Samadi, was killed during a meeting at a building in the Mezzeh district of Damascus. The Israeli airstrikes, as reported by the Syrian Observatory for Human Rights, resulted in the complete destruction of the building, leading to the death of at least 10 military personnel.

His death occurred less than a month after Israel had assassinated another high-ranking Iranian general, Razi Mousavi, in Damascus, and two weeks after the assassination of Saleh al-Arouri in Beirut.
