= April 2024 Iranian strikes on Israel =

Iranian drone and missile strike on Israel

April 2024 Iranian strikes against Israel
- Operation True Promise; Part of the 2024 Iran–Israel conflict and the Iran–Israel conflict during the Syrian civil war
- Type: Missile strike, loitering munitions strike
- Locations: Weapons launched from Iran, Iraq, Lebanon, and Yemen
- Commanded by: Hossein Salami (Note: The attack was coordinated from the IRGC's Nabi Akram Base in Tehran, was under the overall command of IRGC Commander-in-Chief Major General Hossein Salami and with the presence of the Chief of the General Staff Major General Mohammad Bagheri, commander of the Khatam al-Anbiya Central Headquarters Major General Gholam Ali Rashid and IRGC Deputy Commander Brigadier General Ali Fadavi.)
- Objective: Damaging or destroying Israeli military facilities used in the Israeli bombing of the Iranian embassy in Damascus, in reprisal for that attack
- Date: 13–14 April 2024 (1 day)
- Executed by: Iran; Islamic Revolutionary Guard Corps; Aerospace Force; Houthis; Hezbollah; Islamic Resistance in Iraq; Supported by: Syria
- Outcome: Per Israel: Nevatim and Ramon Airbases slightly damaged; Per Iran: Ramon Airbase struck by seven missiles, Nevatim Airbase struck by missiles and intelligence base in the occupied Golan Heights significantly damaged.; Per US: At least nine Iranian missiles struck Nevatim and Ramon Airbases, causing minor damage.
- Casualties: 1 Israeli civilian critically injured by shrapnel; 31 others treated for minor injuries or post-traumatic stress

Iron Shield
- Defence from the 2024 Iranian strikes against Israel
- Type: Air defence operation, missile defence operation
- Locations: Interceptions over Israel, Israeli-occupied Golan Heights (Note: Internationally recognized as Syrian territory, occupied and claimed by Israel, recognized as Israeli by the United States) and West Bank, Jordan, and Syria
- Commanded by: (Israel) Herzi Halevi; (United States) Michael Kurilla; (United Kingdom) Tony Radakin
- Target: Incoming Iranian missiles and loitering munitions
- Executed by: Israel; United States; United Kingdom; Jordan; France; Intelligence support: Saudi Arabia; United Arab Emirates
- Outcome: Weapons intercepted: 99% per Israel; 84% intercepted per Maariv

On 13 April 2024, the Islamic Revolutionary Guards Corps (IRGC), a branch of the Iranian Armed Forces, in collaboration with the Islamic Resistance in Iraq, Lebanese militant group Hezbollah, and the Ansar Allah (Houthis), launched attacks against Israel and the Israeli-occupied Golan Heights with loitering munitions, cruise missiles, and ballistic missiles. The attack was codenamed by Iran as Operation True Promise (Persian: وعده صادق, romanized: va'de-ye sādeq). Iran said it was retaliation for the Israeli bombing of the Iranian embassy in Damascus on 1 April, which killed two Iranian generals. The strike was seen as a spillover of the Gaza war and marked Iran's first direct attack on Israel since the start of their proxy conflict.

Several countries in the Middle East (Note: Iraq, Jordan, Lebanon, Syria, Kuwait, and Israel) closed their airspace a few hours before Iran launched a standoff attack against Israel around midnight on 13 April. Iran's attack sent around 170 drones, over 30 cruise missiles, and more than 120 ballistic missiles toward Israel and the Israeli-occupied Golan Heights. The Israel Defense Forces used Arrow 3 and David's Sling systems to shoot down many of the incoming weapons. American, British, French, and Jordanian air forces also shot some down. France, which intervened at Jordan's request, deployed warships to provide radar coverage. Jordan said it had intercepted objects flying into its airspace to protect its citizens.

Israel said that the coalition, whose defensive efforts were codenamed Iron Shield, destroyed 99 percent of the incoming weapons, most before they reached Israeli airspace. A U.S. official said that at least nine Iranian missiles had struck two Israeli airbases, causing minor damage. Some of the ballistic missiles were shot down in space by the Arrow system. The missiles caused minor damage to the Nevatim Airbase in southern Israel, which remained operational. In Israel, a 7-year-old Israeli Bedouin girl was struck and injured by part of a missile, and 31 other people either suffered minor injuries while rushing to shelters or were treated for anxiety. Jordan reported some shrapnel falling on its territory, causing little damage or injuries. The next day, Iran's envoy to the United Nations stated that the attacks "can be deemed concluded".

The wave of drones was intended to overwhelm anti-aircraft defenses. It was the first time since Iraq's 1991 missile strikes that Israel was directly attacked by the military of another state. Iran's attacks drew criticism from the United Nations, several world leaders, and political analysts, who warned that they risk escalating into a full-blown regional war. Israel retaliated by executing limited strikes on Iran on 18 April 2024.

== Background ==
On 1 April 2024, Israel bombed the Iranian consulate annex building next to the Iranian embassy in Damascus, Syria, killing 16 people, including a woman and her son, and Brigadier General Mohammad Reza Zahedi, a senior Quds Force commander of the Islamic Revolutionary Guard Corps (IRGC), and seven other IRGC officers, in addition to six other militants belonging to Hezbollah and other Iran-linked militias. Soon after the attack, Iran vowed to retaliate, with reports suggesting this as a potential motive for the airstrike. The building was inside the Iranian diplomatic compound, next to the main embassy building. Numerous countries and international organizations condemned the attack; the United States denied involvement and prior knowledge, though Russia's representative in the United Nations (UN) has questioned this claim, calling it "surprising", noting that the U.S. "always possesses information on any topic firsthand thanks to its intelligence capabilities".

In the weeks following the attack on the consulate, the United States, France, Germany and the United Kingdom all warned Iran not to attack Israel and escalate the situation. Iran was warned by Israel that such an attack could lead to a direct Israeli military response on Iranian soil. In early April 2024, Iran sent a message via the Swiss embassy (United States Interests Section in Iran) to the United States, threatening to attack the United States' military bases in the region in case of their support of Israel in a possible Iranian attack on Israel. According to Foreign Minister of Iran Hossein Amir-Abdollahian, Iran gave the regional countries hosting US military bases 72 hours' notice of the imminent attack, but the parties involved varied in their description of the timing and detail of the warning from Iran. Iran held off on attacking for 12 days and messaged via diplomatic channels that it was not interested in waging a full-scale war.

== Attack ==
=== Launching of missiles and drones ===
On the evening of 13 April 2024, Iran launched a drone and missile attack on Israel, targeting—among other unconfirmed trajectories—sites in the Israeli-occupied Golan Heights and Arad region and two airbases in the Negev desert. The attack was named Operation True Promise (Persian: وعده صادق, romanized: va'de-ye sādeq), with the code name Ya Rasul Allah (یارسول‌الله(ص)). It comprised more than 200 missiles and drones according to The Washington Post and included ballistic missiles according to Iranian news agency IRNA. Both CNN and Reuters later reported that more than 300 standoff weapons had been launched toward Israel. An Israeli military spokesman specified that Iran had launched 170 drones, 30 cruise missiles, and 120 ballistic missiles. According to IDF spokesperson Daniel Hagari, approximately 350 rockets were launched at Israel from Iran, Iraq, Lebanon, and Yemen, also noting that the attack consisted of 60 tons of explosive materials.

According to the Iranian Chief of General Staff Mohammad Bagheri, the primary targets included the Nevatim Airbase from which Israel launched the attack on the Iranian consulate, as well as the intelligence center in the Israeli-occupied part of Mount Hermon that supplied the intelligence. The operation was limited to a retaliatory attack for the Israeli attack on the Iranian consulate. Other targets included the Ramon Airbase in the south of Israel, Tel Aviv, and Dimona, which is home to the Shimon Peres Negev Nuclear Research Center. According to IRGC's Tasnim News Agency, the tactic used consisted of saturating the Iron Dome and David's Sling with a first wave of hundreds of HESA Shahed 136 loitering munitions to clear the way for dozens of cruise and ballistic missiles in the second wave. A total of 185 of the newer and faster-flying, jet-propelled Shahed 238 loitering munitions were also used.

Hezbollah said it launched dozens of BM-21 Grad rockets at an Israeli air defense site in the Israeli-occupied Golan Heights. The group said the attack took place shortly after midnight local time. Houthis launched drones.

To prepare for the attack, Israel, alongside Iraq, Jordan, Lebanon, Syria, and Kuwait, closed their airspace on 13 April; Iran only closed its airspace to VFR flights, and Egypt and Syria put its air defense on high alert.

According to Or Fialkov, an Israeli military researcher, some of the missile types used by Iran were the Emad with a warhead of 750 kg, Ghadr-110 with a warhead of between 650 kg and 1000 kg, Kheibar Shekan with a 500 kg warhead, and probably Shahab-3B with a warhead of 700 kg.

=== Israel's defensive operation ===
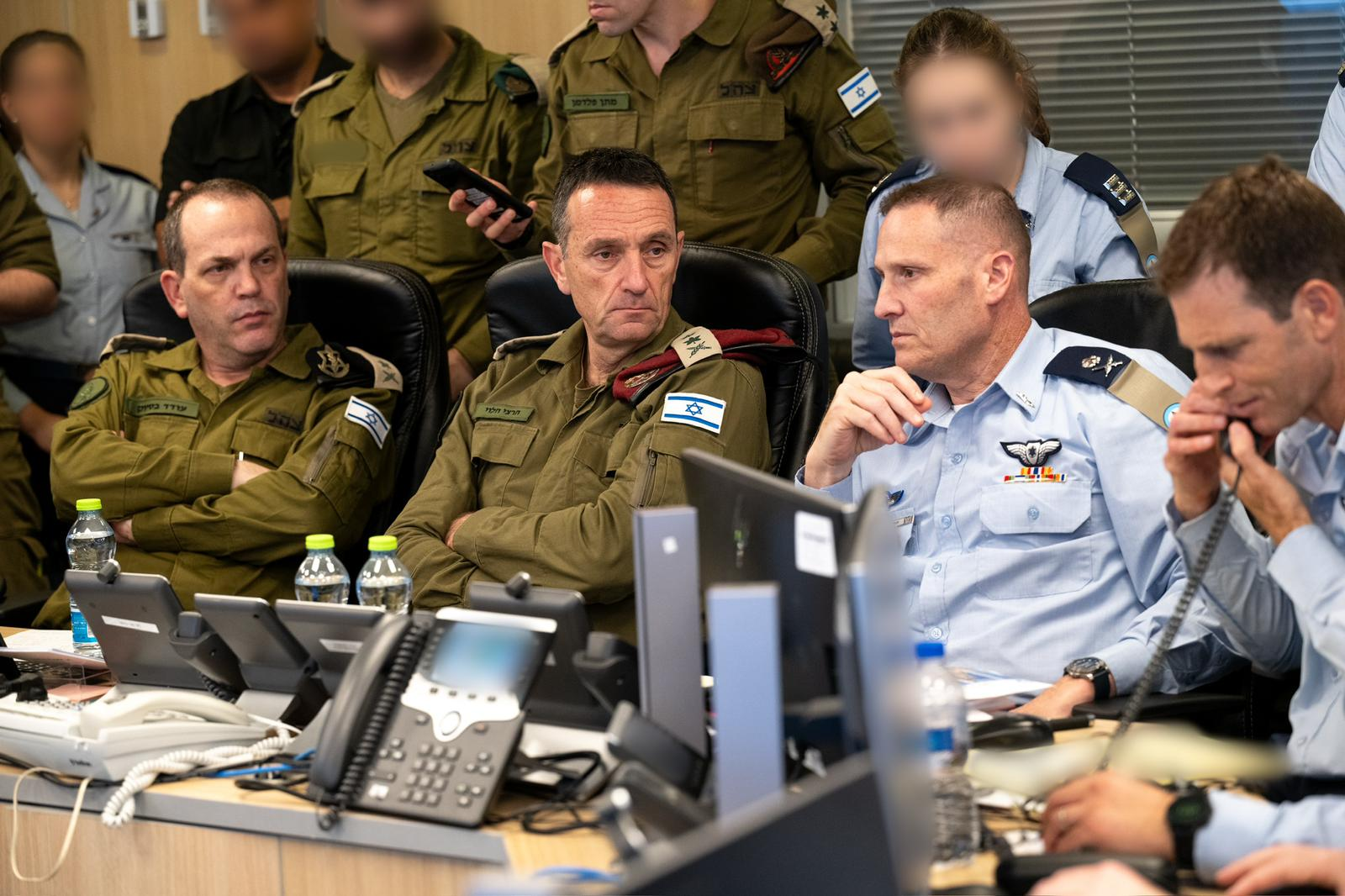
Chief of the General Staff, LTG Herzi Halevi, conducting a situational assessment at the Israeli Air Force Operations Center in HaKirya, Tel Aviv

Israel used the high-altitude Arrow 3 and the medium-range David's Sling systems to shoot down the incoming weapons, and jammed electronic guidance systems to disrupt missile navigation. IDF conducted the defense under the codename Iron Shield. Many drones were downed while flying over Syria, while Syrian Air Defense Force shot down some Israeli interceptors that attempted to enter Syrian airspace. Israel said that 99% of the weapons were successfully intercepted, and that its air force intercepted 25 cruise missiles outside the country, likely over Jordan.

At approximately 2:00 a.m. local time on 14 April, explosions were heard in Jerusalem, while air raid sirens sounded across Israel, the West Bank, and the Dead Sea. It is not known whether the explosions were interceptions by the short-range Iron Dome system or were missile strikes. Iranian missiles above the Al-Aqsa Mosque were intercepted.

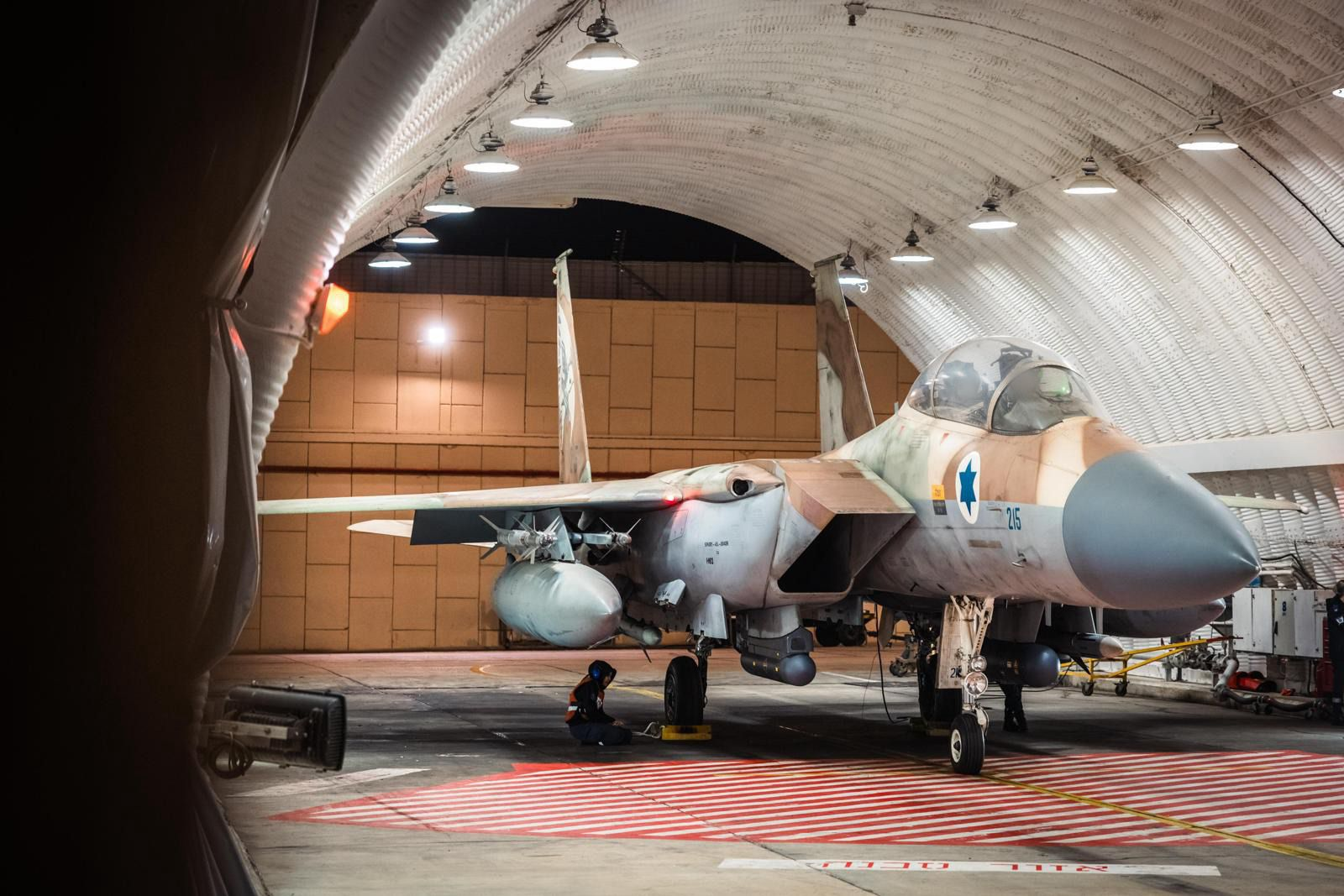
Israeli Air Force F-15I scrambling to intercept Iranian loitering munitions

IDF jets struck military targets in southern Lebanon belonging to Hezbollah's Redwan Force.

=== Defense provided by other countries ===
The United States coordinated the multinational defense of Israel, from northern Iraq to the southern Persian Gulf, from the Combined Air Operations Center at Al Udeid Air Base in Qatar. The U.S., the United Kingdom, France and Jordan used their own forces to intercept Iranian projectiles, and France also deployed its Navy to provide radar coverage. An anonymous source from the Saudi Royal Family said that Saudi Arabia had automatically intercepted "any suspicious entity" violating its airspace. According to The Wall Street Journal, Gulf states such as Saudi Arabia and the United Arab Emirates shared intelligence, which included radar tracking information, with the U.S. and Israel prior to Iran's drone attack.

American aircraft reportedly destroyed more than 80 Iranian weapons—more than half of those threatening Israel—before they reached their targets. The U.S. did not announce where its aircraft launched from; whether any were based in Saudi Arabia is unclear. General Michael Kurilla, the head of United States Central Command (CENTCOM) went to Israel on 11 April, to coordinate air defenses. CENTCOM reported late the following day that US forces destroyed more than 80 one-way attack drones and at least 6 ballistic missiles. The U.S. Navy warships involved were reported to be USS Carney (DDG-64) and USS Arleigh Burke (DDG-51) (both based in the Mediterranean), according to CENTCOM, which also reported that US aircraft from land and sea bases participated. The ships' use of the SM-3 missile was the weapon's first time in combat. A U.S. Army Patriot missile battery in Erbil, Iraq, shot down at least one ballistic missile.

The British component of the defence effort was overseen by Admiral Tony Radakin, the Chief of the Defence Staff. Royal Air Force Typhoon fighter aircraft shot down an unspecified number of Iranian drones, as confirmed by British Prime Minister Rishi Sunak. The aircraft were deployed from RAF Akrotiri in the island of Cyprus as well as Romania and were supported by tanker aircraft. The United Kingdom also provided intelligence, surveillance, and reconnaissance support.

The Wall Street Journal, citing anonymous French officials, reported that France deployed naval assets to assist Israel. President Emmanuel Macron later stated that France had joined in intercepting Iranian drones at Jordan's request.

Jordan lies between Iran and Israel and had readied its air defenses to intercept drones and missiles that violated its airspace. Iran had warned Jordan against any possible action in support of Israel, but Jordan opened its airspace for U.S. and Israeli warplanes nonetheless. Residents in the capital Amman reported seeing flashes in the sky above the city. In the city's Marj al Hamam area, residents gathered around the remnants of a large drone that had been intercepted. Haaretz reported that the Royal Jordanian Air Force had downed 20% of the drones launched from Iran. Jordan stated that its military action was an act of self-defense in an effort to safeguard the nation's airspace, territory, and citizens. There was also criticism towards Jordan's intervention that characterized it as having protected Israel.

=== Casualties and damage ===
Iran claimed that the saturation tactic using drones managed to defeat the Israeli air defense and damage the bases used in the attack on the Iranian consulate. Iran claimed that significant damage; however, several images published by Iranian state media showing damage in Israel were later found to be footage of wildfires in Chile instead.

A senior U.S. official stated that five Iranian ballistic missiles struck the Nevatim Airbase, causing damage to a C-130 transport aircraft, an unused runway, and empty storage facilities. Additionally, four other ballistic missiles impacted the Ramon Airbase. The overall damage caused in the attack was minimal.

There were no deaths, but a number of injuries from the strikes were reported. A 7-year-old Bedouin girl, Amina Hassouna, was seriously injured by shrapnel from an interception in the Arad area. At least 31 others were treated, either for minor injuries sustained from shrapnel while going to protected areas, or for anxiety.

== Aftermath ==
Hours after the beginning of the attacks, Iran's envoy to the United Nations stated that the retaliatory attack "can be deemed concluded" and that Iran would respond with "stronger and more resolute" actions if Israel were to "make another mistake". It also urged the U.S. to stay away from the Iran–Israel conflict. President Ebrahim Raisi said that Iran had taught a "lesson" to Israel through the attack as the Supreme Leader promised. IRGC commander Major General Hossein Salami called the attack "more successful than expected" and threatened retaliation for any Israeli counterattack. The IRGC also threatened to prosecute those expressing support for Israel online. The Iranian government opened criminal investigations into several news outlets for their coverage of the strikes.

Iraq, Jordan, and Israel reopened their airspace soon after the attacks were over. At least two flights from Wizz Air and Royal Jordanian were diverted to Cyprus with over 700 passengers on board. The Cyprus Air Command alongside the two main airports on Cyprus were also placed on high alert as a result of the attack.

The effective interception has led to an increase in the stock prices of Israeli defense firms, such as Elbit Systems, Aerodrome Group, NextVision, and Aryt Industries.

Following the attacks, the Iranian economy experienced immediate adverse effects, with the national currency, the Rial, plummeting to a new low against the dollar.

There were concerns about rising oil prices in the event of Israeli retaliation against Iran. Andy Lipow, President of Lipow Oil Associates, said that "Any attack on oil production or export facilities in Iran would drive the price of Brent crude oil to $100, and the closure of the Strait of Hormuz would lead to prices in the $120 to $130 range."

On 25 April, the United Kingdom unveiled new sanctions targeting the Iranian drone industry.

=== Israeli retaliatory strikes ===
Israel vowed to retaliate against Iran. According to Israeli sources, Israel planned to initiate its first steps in a ground offensive in Rafah during the week, but postponed it to consider their response to the Iranian strikes on Israel. The Israeli war cabinet met on 15 April to consider a response to the attack. On 17 April, Prime Minister Benjamin Netanyahu stated Israel will "make our own decisions" on how to retaliate against Iran.

On 19 April, Israel launched a series of retaliatory missile strikes on Iranian military sites, including one near Isfahan. Iranian officials also reported explosions at military sites in Syria and Iraq.

== Analysis ==
The Intercept reported that American forces "did most of the heavy lifting responding to Iran’s retaliation for the attack on its embassy in Damascus", shooting down more drones and missiles than Israel. The report also notes that the UK, France, Jordan also helped shoot down projectiles. The Intercept added that it was the first time since 1991 that a nation state directly attacked Israel, and despite contending with extremely long distances and utilizing swarms of decoys to evade defense systems in the region, they were able to successfully strike two Israeli military targets, with five missiles hitting Nevatim Air Base and four striking another base.

The Economist wrote that "the strike was militarily a flop", adding that Iran "may have miscalculated". A few months later, the paper wrote that "Iranian strategists might wonder, in hindsight, if they erred in April. The barrage they fired at Israel did not create deterrence. Instead it may have locked them into escalating the war yet again—at great risk to their proxies, and to themselves." Al Jazeera wrote that Iran, in no longer relying solely on its proxies, by launching its first attack on Israel from its own soil, its largest missile attack ever, has increased both its deterrence and its soft power in the wider Muslim world. The Guardian stated that some analysts believed that Iran's attack had shattered Israeli deterrence policy.

The Jerusalem Post noted that the Iranian attack demonstrated that the events of 7 October did not undermine the Israel–Sunni alliance. According to H. A. Hellyer, a Middle East expert, the aim of the attack was not to harm Israel "with that level of warning". According to CNN, the attack by Iran was "planned to minimize casualties while maximizing spectacle", and noted that Iranian drones and missiles went past Jordan and Iraq, both with U.S. military bases, and all the air defenses before penetrating the airspace of Israel.

Dov Zakheim, a former Undersecretary of Defense in the George W. Bush administration, stated that "Iran is an existential threat in a way the Palestinian issue is not", thus bringing to the fore American deterrence vis-à-vis Iran. John Bolton, however, called the attacks "a massive failure of Israeli and American deterrence" and described Biden's disapproval of a possible counterattack as an embarrassment.

An operational analysis by the Institute for the Study of War (ISW) concluded that the attack was likely intended to cause significant damage below the threshold that would trigger a massive Israeli response. The think tank also noted that the "attack package" followed the Russian doctrine used in air strikes against Ukraine during the Russian invasion of Ukraine, albeit on a much larger scale and in a single mission. ISW predicted that the lessons that Iran will learn from this attack will allow it to identify the relative strengths and weaknesses of Israel's air defense system and build more successful attack packages in the future, and possibly share these experiences with Russia as well.

The Wall Street Journal attributed Israel's success to a combination of its "sophisticated air-defense system and critical assistance provided by the U.S. and other Western and Arab partners," whilst The Times diplomatic editor Roger Boyes suggested that the attack "showed that Israel has only a limited self-sufficiency in security matters. It was dependent on U.S. intelligence for the timing of the assault, for the location of many of the firing positions and on U.S., British and French assistance to help shoot down the incoming munitions". According to The Times of Israel, Israel's capability of taking direct and comprehensive strategic action solely on its own initiative was henceforth constrained, and furthermore the calculus of deterrence throughout the region has been changed. Haaretz regarded America's assistance as its "most significant show of support in the history of Israeli-U.S. relations".

According to Reuters, analysts estimate that the cost for Israel and its allies to defend the attack was about $1 billion, while the cost to Iran for the attack was about $80 million to $100 million. The current cost of Israel's short-range Iron Dome, medium-range David's Sling, and high-altitude Arrow 2 and Arrow 3 systems to intercept airborne threats is in the range of tens of thousands to millions of dollars, but future laser-based systems may substantially decrease the cost of each interception.

== Reactions ==
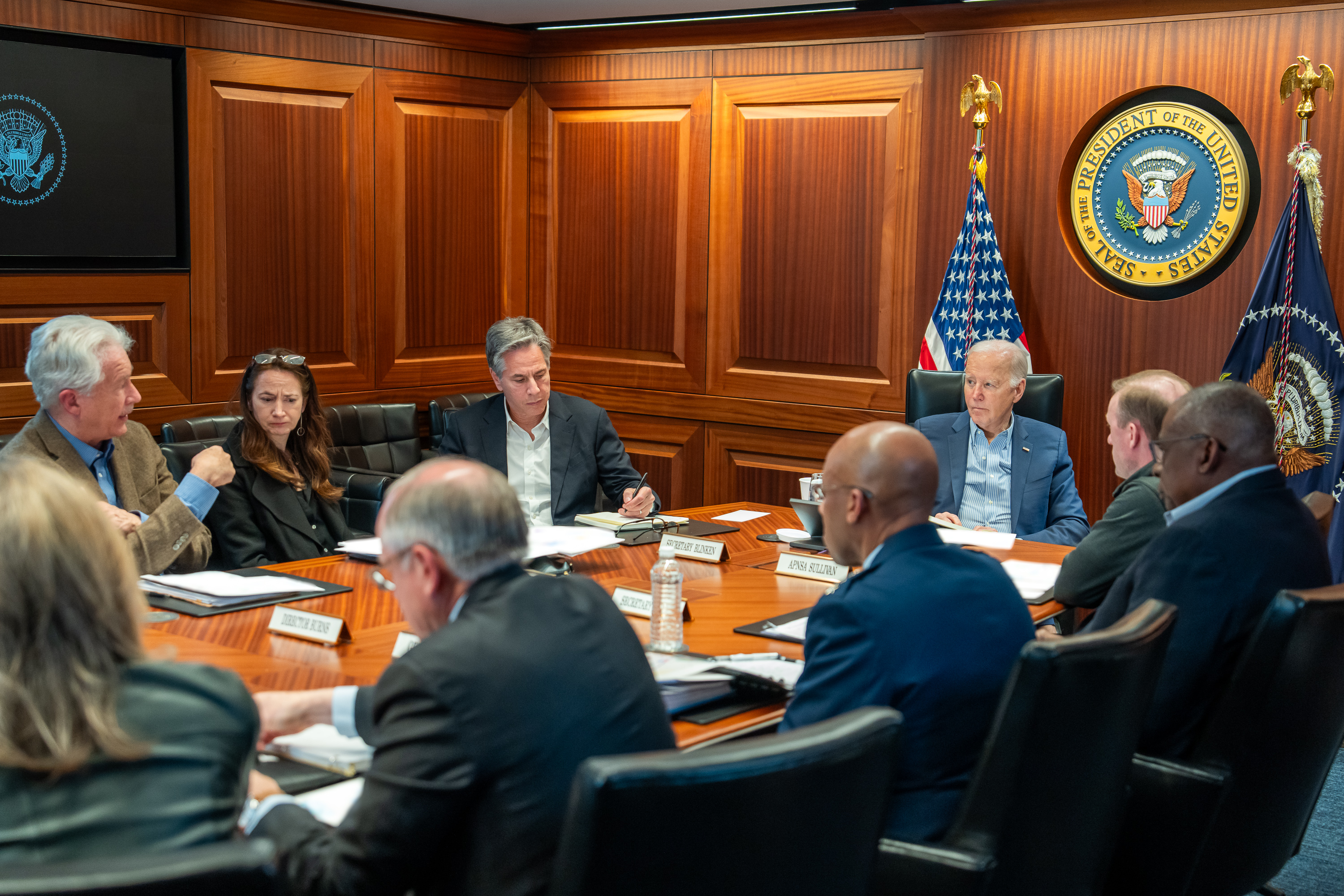
U.S. President Joe Biden and his national security administration assessing the attack in the Situation Room

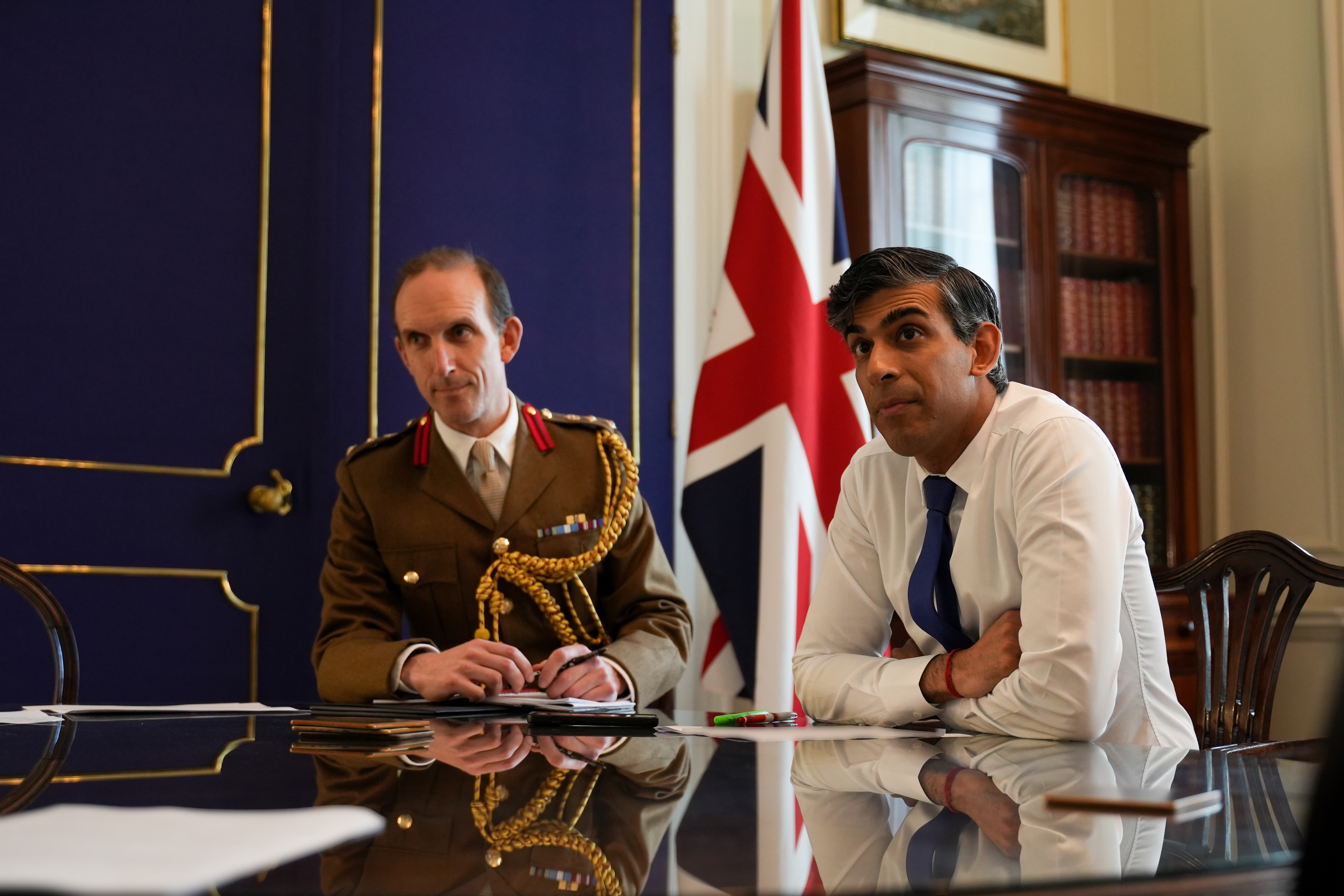
UK Prime Minister Rishi Sunak during a call with G7 leaders discussing the attack

Iranian Foreign Affairs Minister Hossein Amir-Abdollahian declared that Iran does not welcome escalation, and the purpose of the Iranian operation was the exercise of the legitimate right of Iran for self-defense. The Iranian government declared its reprisal against Israel a success and concluded. Major General Ahmad Haghtalab, the IRGC commander in charge of protecting the security of nuclear sites in Iran said they could change their nuclear doctrine if their nuclear facilities were threatened by Israel.

Israeli Defense Minister Yoav Gallant said the IDF halted the attack impressively. Gallant stated that the attack was successfully repelled with the assistance of the United States and other countries. He emphasized the opportunity to form a strategic alliance to counter the serious and possibly nuclear threat posed by Iran. Israel vowed "a significant response" to Iran's retaliation.

Hamas said that the Iranian military operation against Israel was a "natural right and a deserved response" to the Israeli bombing of the Iranian consulate in Damascus and assassination of IRGC leaders there. The Houthis said that the attacks were a legitimate response to the strike on Iran's consulate in Damascus.

On 14 April, Jordanian Prime Minister Bisher Khasawneh stated during a cabinet meeting that any regional escalation would lead to "dangerous paths", adding that all parties involved need to de-escalate. On the same day, the country's Foreign Affairs Minister Ayman Safadi stated that Jordan would take "all necessary measures" to protect its sovereignty and security and that it will tackle threats facing its citizens. Safadi said Jordan had summoned Iran's ambassador to protest "offensive statements" made in Iranian media, particularly about threats against Jordan being the next target if it joined in on the interceptions, calling it an interference in the country's internal affairs. Safadi also added that Jordan would respond in the same way whether the threat came from Israel, Iran or any other country, and noted that the continuation of the Gaza war and instability in the West Bank would lead to further conflict, calling for a two state solution. King Abdullah II of Jordan spoke with U.S. President Joe Biden, stating that Jordan will not allow its land to become the center of a regional war.

=== Iranian public ===
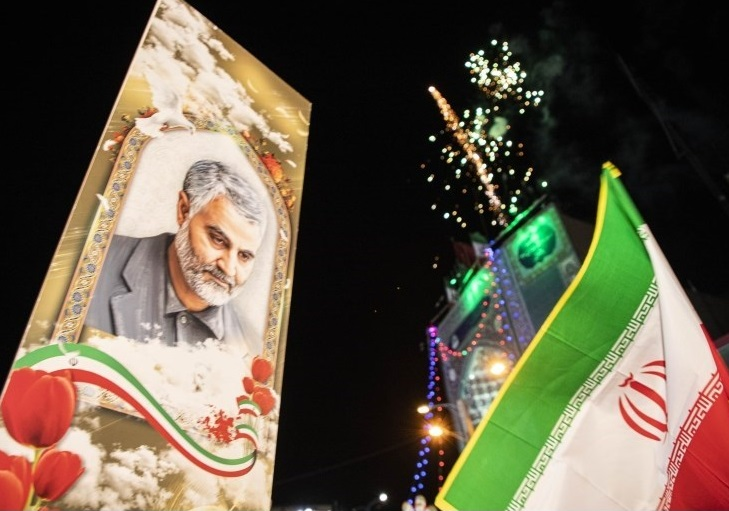
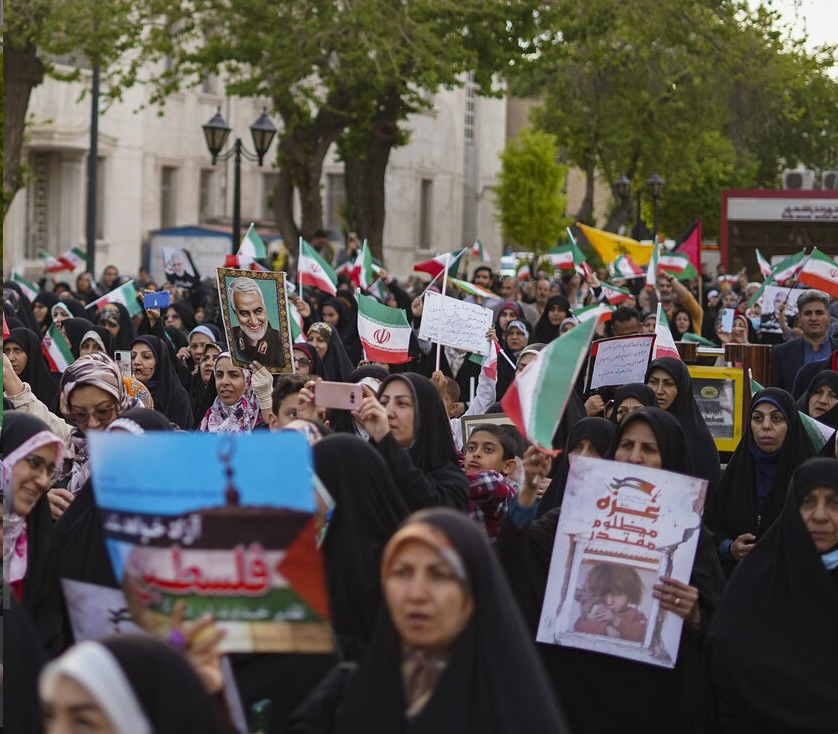
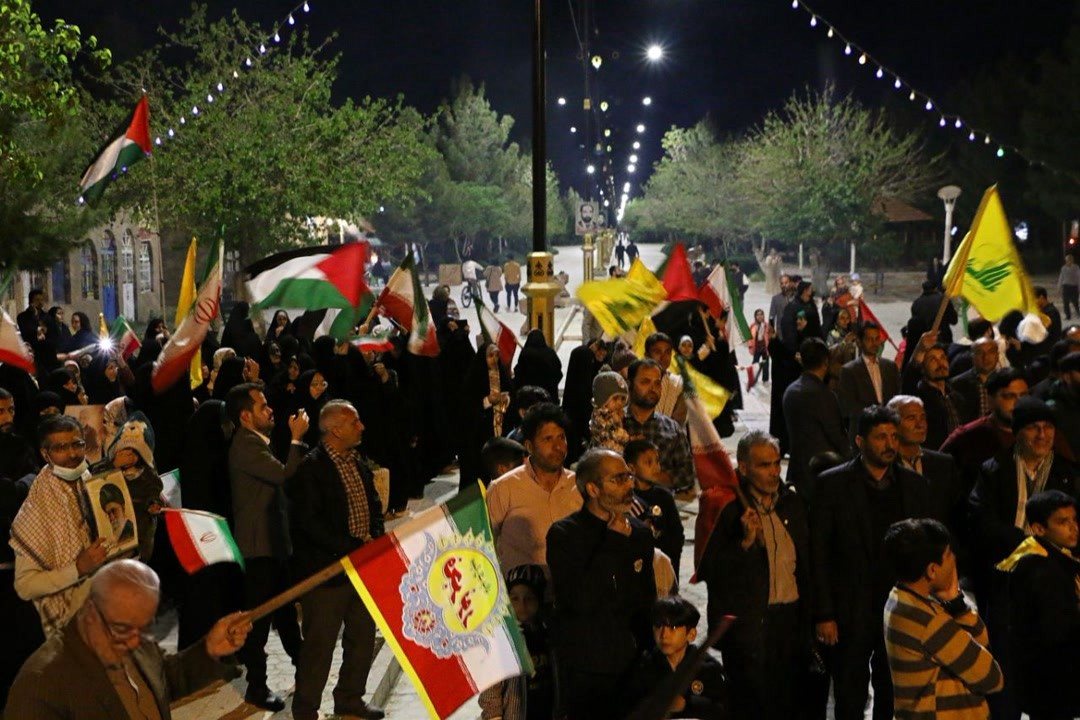
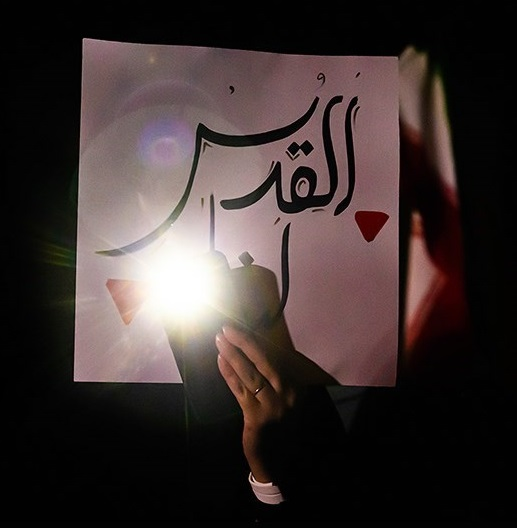
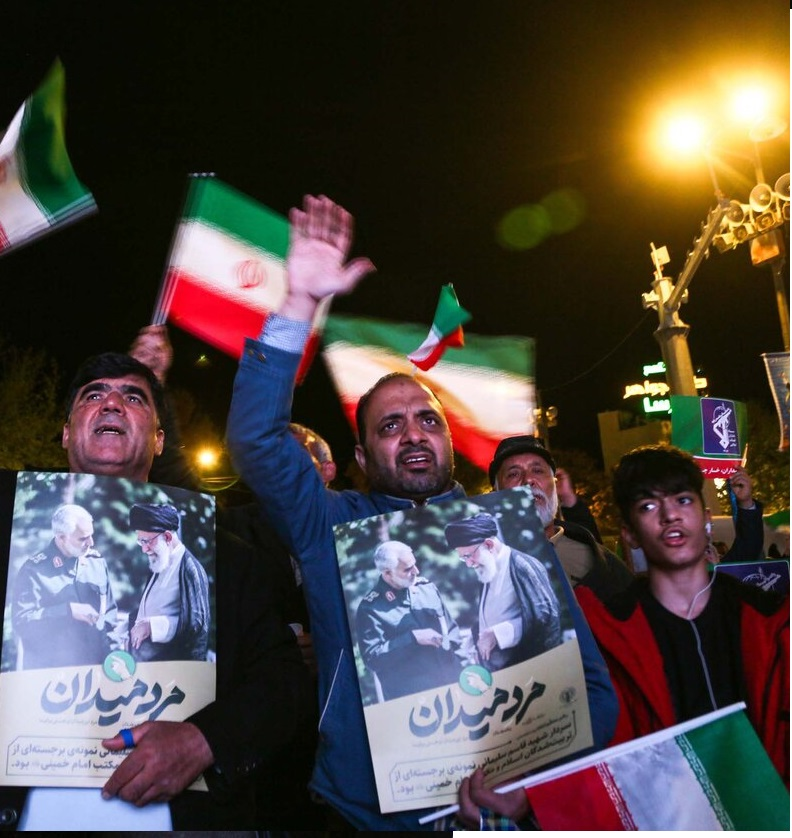
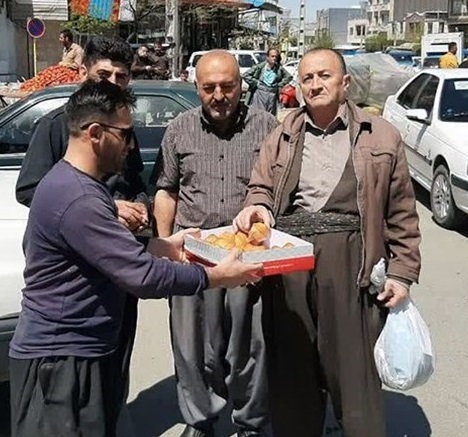
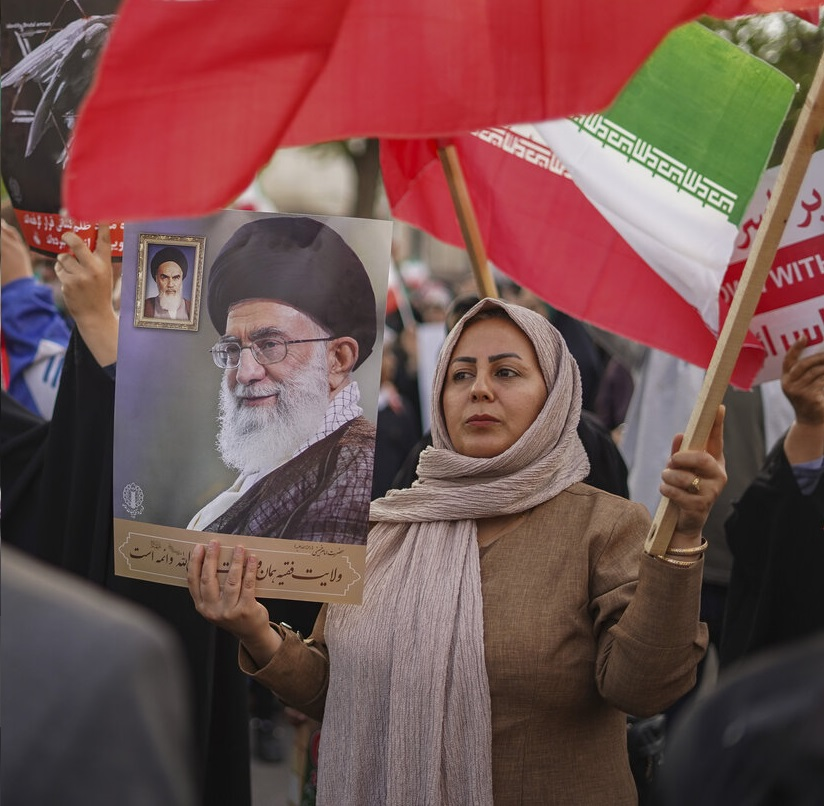
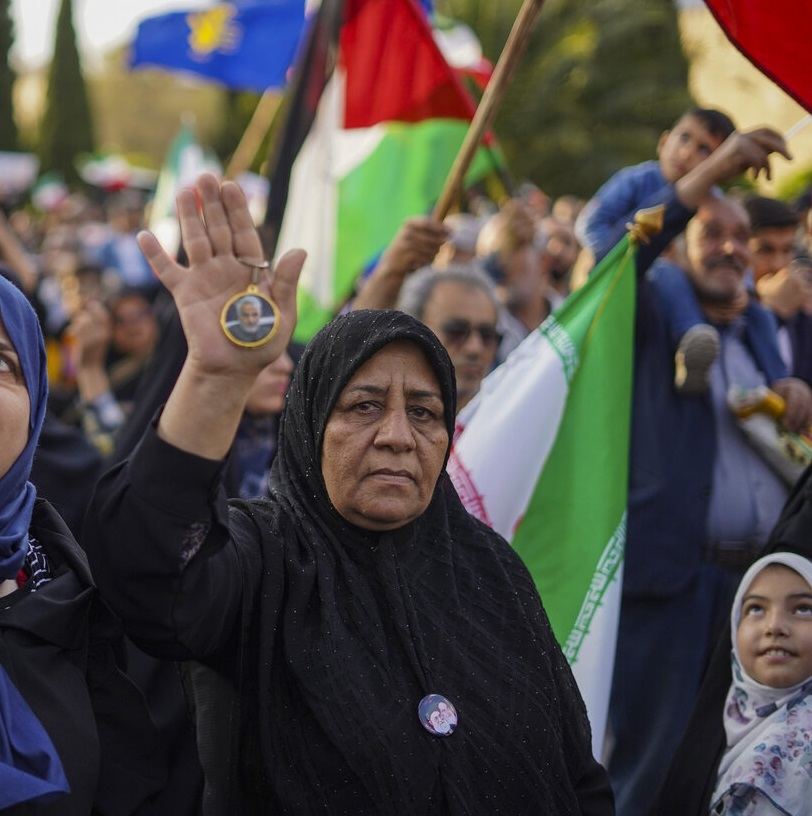
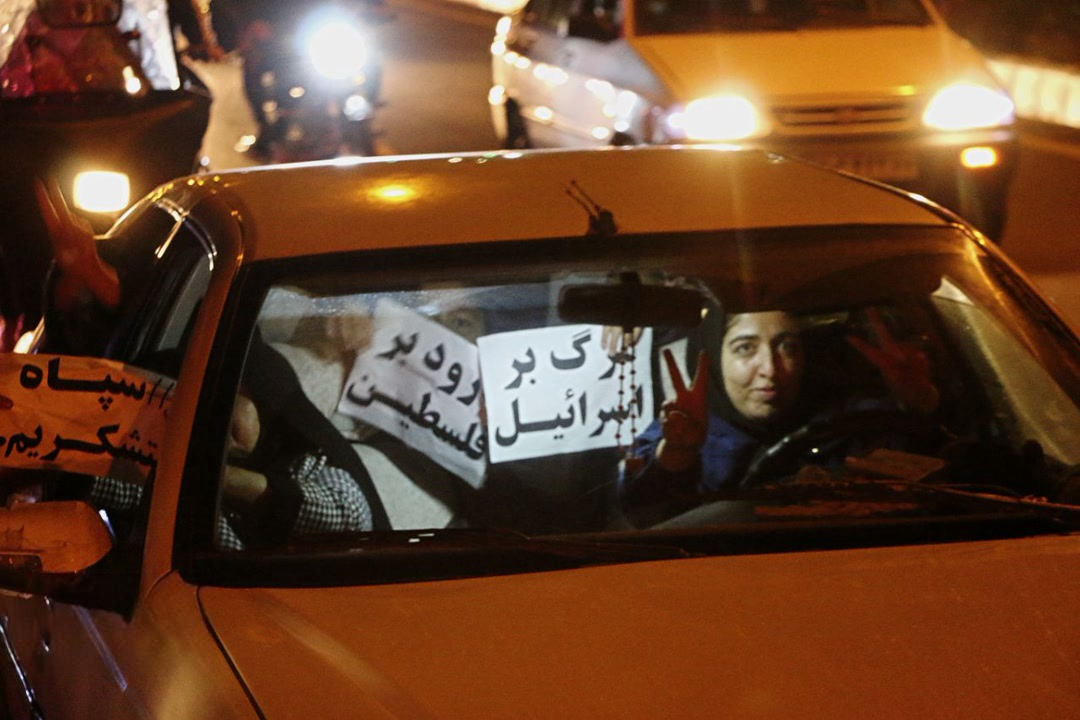
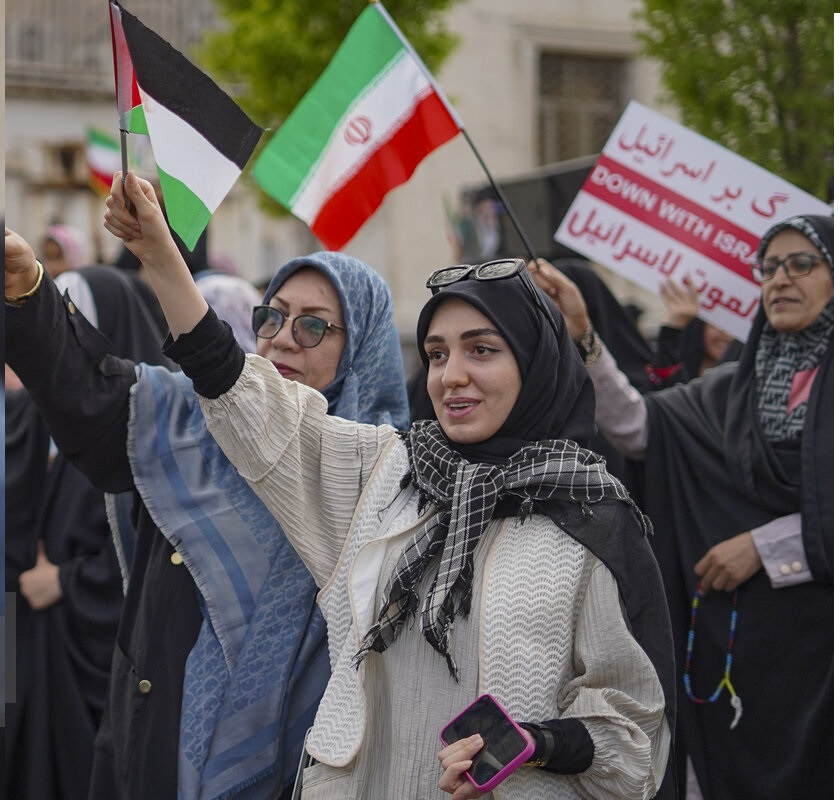
Celebrations and gatherings in Tehran, after the Iranian strikes against Israel

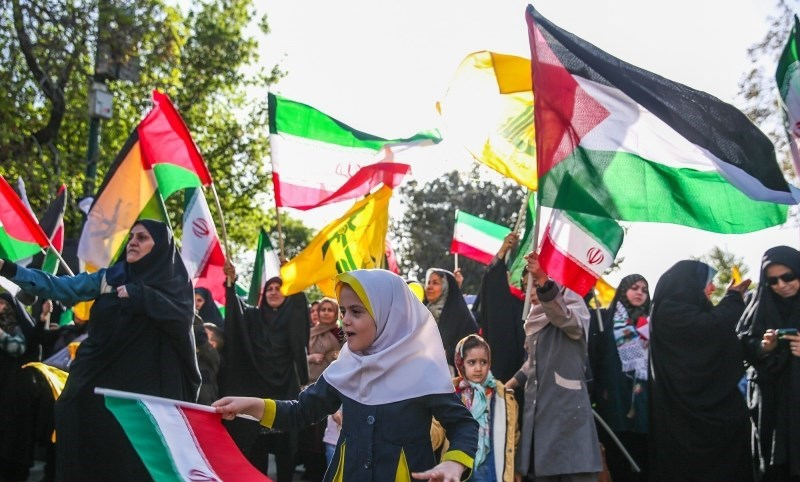
Women and children at a demonstration in Qazvin in support of the Iranian strikes in Israel, 16 April 2024

Demonstrations broke out in cities across Iran and in the Gaza Strip in support of the strikes. Demonstrators waved Iranian and Palestinian flags next to banners that read "God's victory is near". Supporters of the retaliatory attack also demonstrated in Isfahan, the burial place of Mohammad Reza Zahedi, and in Kerman next to the grave of Qasem Soleimani, who was killed in a 2020 US drone strike in Baghdad.

The Front of Islamic Revolution Stability, a hardline Shia supremacist faction within Iran who are to Iran what the religious hard right are to Israel, endorsed the attacks and put up banners across Tehran's billboards in Hebrew, telling Israelis to stock up on supplies in preparation for another attack while some others concern that the aggressive foreign policy could lead to war.

=== International ===
Canada and the United States both condemned the attack, and the United States said it would support Israel against Iran. Saudi Arabia called for restraint, and said that the United Nations Security Council must take responsibility for maintaining peace and security in the region.

On 14 April, protesters in Toronto cheered the airstrikes, chanting "Allahu Akbar!" A protest leader characterized the strikes as a response to Israeli airstrikes in the region, while Melissa Lantsman, a member of parliament, said that the chants showed "It was never about a ceasefire". Other chants included "Intifada, Intifada, long live the Intifada" and "From the water to the water, Palestine is Arab".

One of the first leaders to respond to the attack was British Prime Minister Rishi Sunak, stating: "The UK will continue to stand up for Israel's security and that of all our regional partners, including Jordan and Iraq." The United Kingdom condemned the Iranian attack on Israel as "reckless".

U.S. President Joe Biden shortened a planned visit to Delaware and returned to the White House to meet with national security officials. Biden called the intercepted attacks a win for Israel, and committed to a unified diplomatic response from the G7. A White House spokesperson labelled the Iranian strikes a "spectacular and embarrassing failure". The Embassy of the United States in Jerusalem posted a security alert urging its workers to seek shelter until further notice. Biden told Israeli Prime Minister Benjamin Netanyahu that the United States would not back Israel in a possible future counterattack against Iran. U.S. Defense Secretary Lloyd Austin asked Israel to give the United States advance notice if they planned to attack Iran. Overall, the U.S. president sought to prevent further escalation.

On 13 April, Cypriot President Nikos Christodoulides called for an emergency meeting of the National Security Council which was held on 14 April to discuss the developments in the region. Additionally, the Cyprus Ministry of Foreign Affairs condemned the attack on Israel. Furthermore, the Ministry of Foreign Affairs as a precautionary measure enacted the "Estia" plan.

On 16 April, Israel, the United States, the Netherlands and other countries called on the international community to impose sanctions on Iran's missile program.

On 17 April, Jordan said Israeli retaliation for Iran strikes risked sparking wider regional war.

==== Other countries ====
- Argentina: President Javier Milei expressed "solidarity and unwavering commitment" to Israel, and said he "emphatically support[s] the State of Israel in the defense of its sovereignty". Milei promised that Argentina "will always be on [Israel's] side." Milei also accused Iran of "seeking the destruction of Western civilization."
- Australia: Prime Minister Anthony Albanese condemned the Iranian attack and reiterated the necessity for sanctions against Iran.
- Brazil: The Ministry of Foreign Affairs initially appealed "to all involved parties to exercise maximum restraint" and called on the international community to "mobilize efforts to prevent escalation." After facing public criticism for not condemning Iran, Foreign Minister Mauro Vieira told in a press conference that "Brazil always condemns any act of violence and calls for understanding between the parties."
- Canada: Prime Minister Justin Trudeau said that Canada unequivocally condemns Iran's attacks against Israel, stands with Israel, and that "we support Israel's right to defend itself".
- Chile: Foreign minister Alberto van Klaveren expressed concern over "the serious escalation of tensions in the Middle East and the Iranian attacks against Israel", adding that Chile "condemns the use of force and defends international humanitarian law, which protects civilian lives in armed conflicts".
- China: The Foreign Ministry urged restraint and called the attack "the latest spillover of the Gaza conflict". In a call with Iranian counterpart Hossein Amir-Abdollahian, Foreign Minister Wang Yi reiterated Iran's assertion that its attack was a "limited" action taken in self-defense, adding he believed Iran could "handle the situation well and spare the region further turmoil".
- Egypt: The Ministry of Foreign Affairs voiced its apprehension regarding the Iranian offensive and the dangerous indications of heightened tensions between the Iran and Israel, emphasized the need for maximum self-control to prevent further instability and tension in the region.
- Germany: Chancellor Olaf Scholz condemned the Iranian attack as "unjustifiable and highly irresponsible", and assured that "Germany stands by Israel".
- India: The Ministry of External Affairs expressed deep concern over the heightened tensions between Israel and Iran and called for an immediate de-escalation.
- Indonesia: The Ministry of Foreign Affairs warned citizens against travel to Iran and Israel effective 14 April. It also asked both sides to deescalate tensions to prevent a full-scale war. The Ministry of Energy and Mineral Resources suspended oil and gas importation from Iran on 15 April until further notice.
- Ireland: Taoiseach Simon Harris and Tánaiste Micheál Martin both issued statements strongly condemning Iran's attack, with Martin adding that Iran has been "a malign actor in the Middle East for quite some time" in its support of Hezbollah, Hamas and the Houthis.
- Japan: Prime Minister Fumio Kishida expressed "strong condemnation" and "deep concern" over the Iranian attack, while Foreign Minister Yoko Kamikawa said the attack further aggravated the situation in the Middle East.
- Netherlands: Prime Minister Mark Rutte condemned Iran's attack. Rutte said Iran's Islamic Revolutionary Guards Corps (IRGC) should be added to the EU's terrorism blacklist.
- North Korea: The Korean Central News Agency published an article supporting the attack stating that it was "demonstrating the Iranian people's will to punish Zionists and protect their sovereignty."
- Norway: Prime Minister Jonas Gahr Støre and Foreign Minister Espen Barth Eide both condemned Iran's attack, while calling on all parties to exercise maximum restraint.
- Russia: The Foreign Affairs Ministry said that it was very concerned by the Iranian strikes on Israel, calling it "another dangerous escalation in the region". It said that Iran's retaliatory attack was in accordance with Article 51 of the UN Charter and called for all parties to exercise restraint, adding that Russia had warned about an increase in tension because of "numerous unresolved crises in the Middle East".
- Singapore: The Ministry of Foreign Affairs condemned the strikes on Israel and added that they "exacerbate tensions" and "further destabilise an already tense region".
- South Korea: The Government of South Korea strongly condemned the Iranian attacks.
- Spain: Prime Minister Pedro Sánchez and Minister of Foreign Affairs José Manuel Albares both posted a condemnation of Iran's attack on X, with Sánchez asking all countries involved to avoid "at all costs an even greater escalation".
- Taiwan: Foreign Minister Joseph Wu told reporters at a Legislative Yuan meeting: "We join other democratic countries worldwide in condemning Iran's attack on Israel." President Tsai Ing-wen conveyed condolences and solidarity in a meeting with an Israeli delegation led by Boaz Toporovsky on the topic of Iran's attack.
- Turkey: Foreign Minister Hakan Fidan stated on a phone call to his Iranian counterpart that Turkey did not want further escalation following Iran's retaliation on Israel. The Iranian Foreign Minister told Fidan that its "retaliatory operation" against Israel had ended, adding that Iran would not launch a new operation unless it was attacked.
- Ukraine: President Volodymyr Zelenskyy condemned the strikes on social media, saying "Iran's actions threaten the entire region and the world, just as Russia's actions threaten a larger conflict". The Foreign Ministry condemned Iran's attack as "unacceptable and irresponsible" and called for efforts to prevent a "larger regional conflict".
- Uruguay: The Ministry of Foreign Relations condemned the use of force by Iran and regretted the "worsening of the conflict, as well as the consequences it could entail for the humanitarian situation and civilian victims". In addition, it confirmed that the Uruguayan embassies in the region were following the development of events.

=== Supranational ===
- European Union: High Representative for Foreign Affairs and Security Policy Josep Borrell "strongly condemned" Iran's attack and called it "an unprecedented escalation and a grave threat to regional security".
- United Nations: Secretary-General António Guterres "strongly condemn[ed] the serious escalation represented by the large-scale attack".

== See also ==
- Hezbollah–Israel conflict
- Iran–Israel conflict during the Syrian civil war
- 2024 Houthi drone attack on Israel
- Iranian seizure of the MSC Aries
- 1991 Iraqi missile attacks against Israel
- Operation True Promise II
- Operation True Promise III
