= Iraj Tanzifi =

Scholar from Iran (1938–2024)

Iraj Tanzifi (Persian: ایرج تنظیفی; 26 April 1938 – 9 February 2024) was an Iranian scholar and sculptor.

== Early life ==
Iraj Tanzifi was born on 26 April 1938. After receiving a guidance school degree, in Gorgan, he enrolled in high school. After two years, he received a diploma in teaching. In 1966 he was accepted in the field of sculpture, went to college, then switched to painting and achieved his optimum. Iraj also taught art with Moallemi. His classmates included Yadu'llah Derakhshani, Mohammadhosein Halimi and Jamaluddin Khorraminezhad.

== Career ==
Tanzifi taught sculpture, and is the founder of modern sculpture in copper. He was labeled the “Father of modern sculpture in Iran”. In 2006, he was a guest professor in Paris for three months. In addition to painting and sculpture, he was also a poet.

== Death ==
Tanzifi died from heart disease on 9 February 2024, at the age of 85.
