= Mohammad Ali Salamat =

Iranian alleged rapist (1981–2024)

- Born: Mohammad Ali Salamat; 22 September 1981; Hamadan, Iran
- Died: 12 November 2024 (aged 43); Bagh Behesht, Hamadan, Iran
- Cause of death: Hanging
- Other name: Ali Salamat
- Penalty: Execution for sexual assault

Details
- Victims: More than 200 women and girls
- Country: Iran

Mohammad Ali Salamat (22 September 1981 – 12 November 2024), also known by the alias “Ali Salamat,” was a pharmacist and an accused rapist of more than 200 women and girls in Hamadan. He was arrested on 15 January 2024, in Tehran by the Intelligence Protection Unit of the Hamadan Judiciary, in cooperation with the Tehran Provincial Intelligence Department, and subsequently transferred to Hamadan.

On the morning of 12 November 2024, he was publicly executed at "Bagh Behesht" in Hamadan.

== Criminal history and methods ==
Mohammad Ali Salamat, alias "Ali Salamat," established a pharmacy in a property inherited from his father. He exploited excuses such as marriage proposals, friendships, delivering medications, and even selling abortion pills to deceive and sexually exploit women. Some victims stated that Salamat committed his first rape at the age of 17, after which he continued targeting vulnerable women.

== Arrest and legal proceedings ==
=== Attempt to flee ===
When some victims filed complaints against him, an arrest warrant was issued. Salamat, aware of the possibility of being detained, fled from Hamadan to Tehran and attempted to leave the country illegally. However, law enforcement tracked his hideout in Tehran, leading to his arrest on 15 January 2024.

=== Case formation and trial ===
The case against Mohammad Ali Salamat formally began on 21 May 2023. On 15 January 2024, he was arrested in Hamadan while jogging on Eram Boulevard. Prosecutors invited victims to come forward and provide testimonies about his crimes.

In a video shared on social media on 17 January 2024, dozens of Hamadan residents gathered outside the Provincial Judiciary to protest. Demonstrators alleged collusion between Salamat and judicial authorities. The outcry led to intensified investigations and expedited legal proceedings.

=== Convictions and execution ===
Despite multiple appeals to Iran’s Supreme Court, Salamat's death sentence was upheld. On 12 November 2024, he was executed in Hamadan, marking the end of one of Iran's most notorious sexual assault cases.

This case brought national attention due to the number of victims and the severity of the crimes. Reports revealed that some victims faced severe psychological consequences, including depression and suicide.
