= Karim Mojtahedi =

Iranian philosophy professor (1930–2024)

- كريم مجتهدی
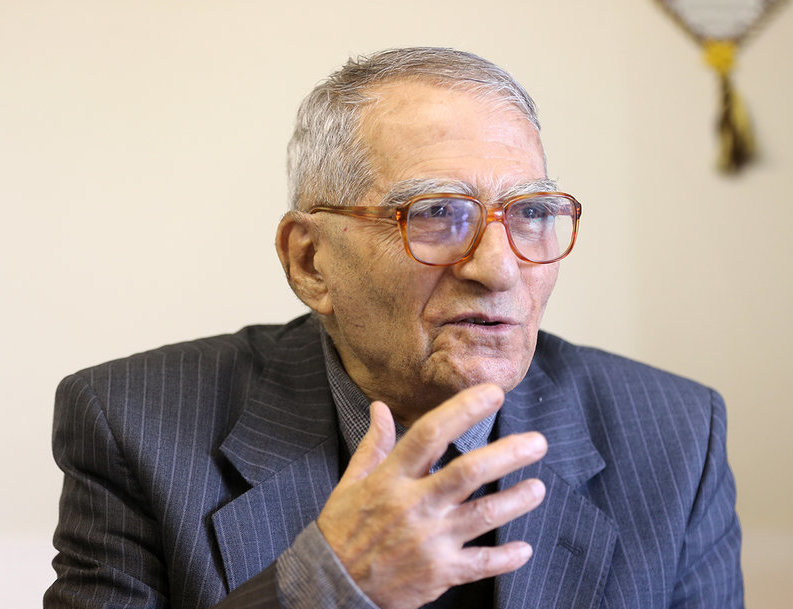
- Mojtahedi in 2018
- Born: 1 September 1930; Tabriz, Persia
- Died: 15 January 2024 (aged 93)

Philosophical work
- Era: 21st century philosophy
- Region: Western Philosophy
- School: Continental
- Main interests: Hegel's philosophy Occidentalism

Karim Mojtahedi (1 September 1930 – 15 January 2024) was an Iranian philosophy professor at Tehran University. He published over 20 books on philosophy. He was awarded UNESCO's Avicenna Prize for Ethics in Science at the 4th International Farabi Festival and received a plaque of honor from Iran's Cultural Luminaries Association. Born on 1 September 1930, Mojtahedi died on 15 January 2024, at the age of 93.

== Published works ==
- Hegel's Thoughts
- Descartes and his philosophy
- Philosophy of history
- Kant's critical philosophy

== See also ==
- Intellectual movements in Iran
