= St Nikolas (ship) =

Oil tanker

The oil tanker St Nikolas (formerly Suez Rajan) has been involved in two geopolitically prominent seizures, by the United States and Iran. In April 2023 the Greek-managed Marshall Islands-flagged oil tanker Suez Rajan was seized by US authorities, for breaching US sanctions against Iranian oil, which fell under US jurisdiction due to the use of US financial services. The US then confiscated and sold the carried Iranian oil.

In January 2024, while the ship was carrying oil from Iraq to Turkey through the Gulf of Oman, Iranian soldiers boarded and seized the ship in accordance with an Iranian court order.

== US seizure ==
Seizure of the oil tanker Suez Rajan
- Location: 70 miles (110 km) from Galveston, Texas
- Date: April 2023
- Executed by: United States Coast Guard

The Marshall Islands-flagged Suez Rajan, carrying Iranian-grade crude oil, was seized in April 2023 by the US Department of Justice. The Suez Rajan was carrying about 800,000 barrels of oil, a cargo worth about $56 million. The US justification for the seizure was violation of US sanctions on Iran's oil exports, and the US said the Suez Rajan scheme "attempted to disguise the origin of the oil using ship-to-ship transfers". Suez Rajan Ltd., the owner of the ship, pleaded guilty and was fined $2.5 million. The US claimed ownership of the confiscated oil. As the original payment to Iran for the Iranian oil was done using US dollar transaction wire transfers, without a license issued by the Office of Foreign Assets Control of the US Department of the Treasury, the US could claim jurisdiction under US law.

The specific attempt at obfuscating the origin of the Iranian oil involved first taking on a small amount of oil from the oil tanker CS Brillance. And then a few days later taking on a large amount of oil from the oil tanker Virgo, but falsifying the logs to say that all the oil on board had come from the CS Brillance. While the US trial was under way, the Suez Rajan was anchored near Singapore for nearly a year. The loading operation from CS Brillance took place at the Tanjung Pelepas Port in Malaysia on February 4, 2022, while the loading operation from Virgo took place in at the EOPL anchorage off Singapore on or about February 5 or 6, 2022. The Voyage Instructions indicated that the final discharge port for the crude oil was "CHINA FOR ORDER". After the successful conclusion of the civil forfeiture action in the U.S. District Court for the District of Columbia, Suez Rajan was ordered to sail to Houston.

On 29 May 2023 the Suez Rajan arrived offshore of Galveston and remained at anchor some 70 miles (110 km) from the Texas port. The vessel had a Greece-based manager. The US companies that managed unloading tankers were too worried about Iranian reprisal to handle the captured oil on the Suez Rajan. The shipping companies fear any vessel unloading it would lead other oil buyers to shun their ships on future voyages.

=== Aftermath ===
Alireza Tangsiri, the Guards' navy commander, emphasised Tehran would hold Washington responsible for allowing the unloading of the tanker's content. He said Iran would retaliate against any oil company unloading Iranian oil from a seized tanker.

On 29 April 2023 the Iran Navy seized a Marshall Islands flagged Suezmax tanker, the Advantage Sweet, laden with oil from Kuwait and bound for Houston, off Muscat. It appeared that the vessel managers were Turkish and the owner was Chinese. This seizure was in response to the U.S. seizing the Iran-origin cargo on the Suez Rajan off southeast Malaysia earlier in the month, which was then sailing to the US.

== Iranian seizure ==
On 11 January 2024, four to five members of the Iranian Navy boarded and took control of the Marshall Islands-flagged, Greek-operated civilian oil tanker Suez Rajan (since renamed St Nikolas). The course of the oil tanker was altered towards the coast of Iran after the capture. The oil tanker at the time was reported to have been carrying 145,000 short tons (132,000 t) of crude oil from Iraq to Turkey. St Nikolas had a crew of 18 Filipinos and one Greek national.

An Iranian court had ordered the seizure of the ship to recover the losses suffered by Iran when the US confiscated Iranian oil in 2023. Iran has described the ship as an 'American oil tanker'.

== See also ==
- Nader Mahdavi
- Operation Nimble Archer
- Operation Praying Mantis
- Operation Prime Chance
- USS Stark incident
