= Razi Mousavi =

Iranian general (1963–2023)

Sardar Razi Mousavi
- Born: 23 September 1962; Chashm, Pahlavi Iran
- Died: 25 December 2023 (aged 61); Sayyidah Zaynab, Rif Dimashq, Ba'athist Syria
- Military career
- Allegiance: Iran
- Branch: Islamic Revolutionary Guard Corps
- Service years: 1980–2023
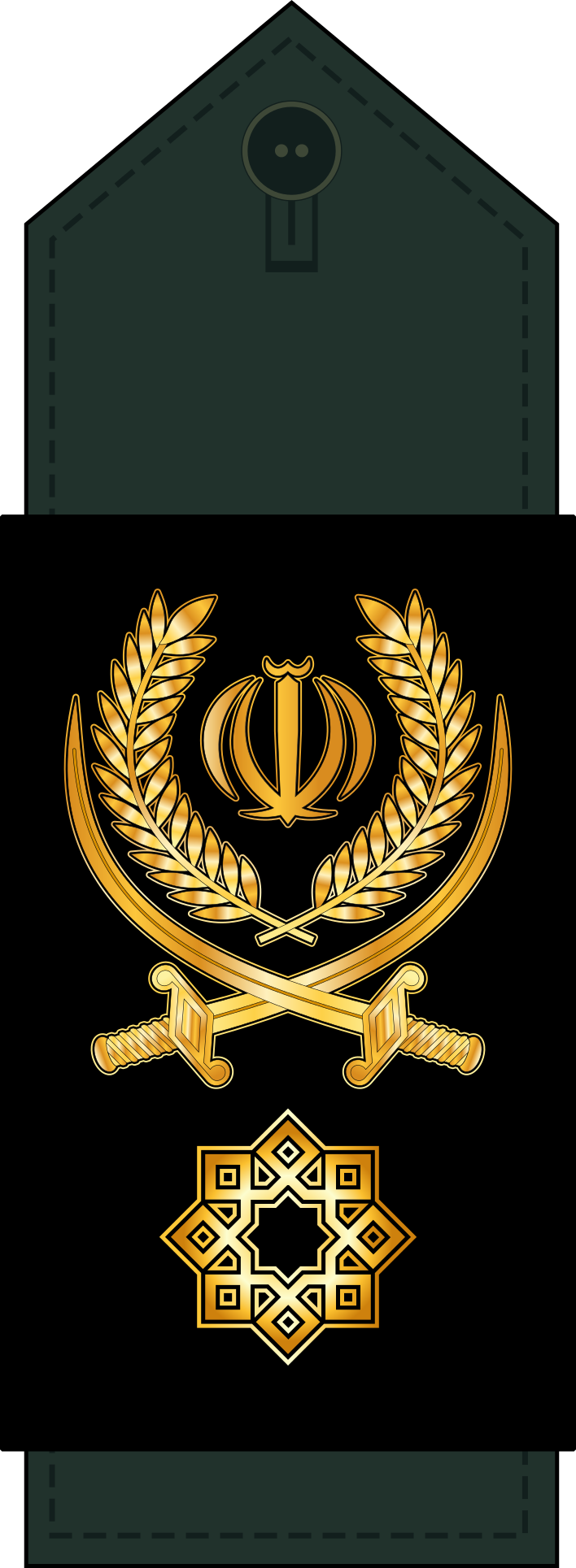
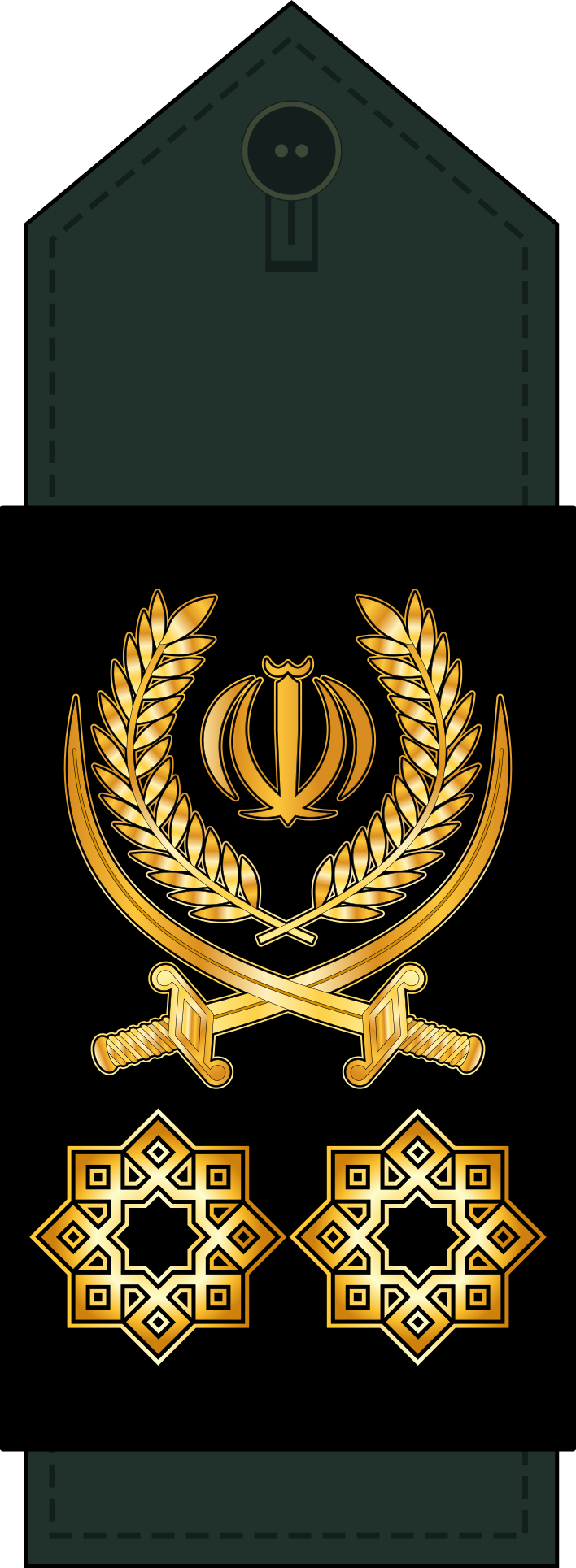
- Rank: Brigadier General; Major General (posthumously)
- Conflicts: Iran–Iraq War; Syrian civil war; Iranian intervention in the Syrian Civil War; Iran–Israel conflict during the Syrian civil war; Gaza war; Israel-Hezbollah conflict

Razi Mousavi (Persian: رازی موسوی; 1963 – 25 December 2023) was an Iranian military officer who served in the IRGC's Quds Force. He was killed by an Israeli airstrike in Sayyidah Zaynab, Rif-Dimashq, Syria during the Gaza war. At the time of his death, Mousavi was described as Iran's most influential military commander in Syria.

== Military career ==
Born in 1963, Mousavi served in Syria under the IRGC's elite unit, the Quds Force, from the 1980s, facilitating the transfer of arms and funds to the Lebanese paramilitary group Hezbollah. In 1990, he assumed the role of the head of the Iranian logistical division in Syria, known as Unit 2250. Throughout the Syrian civil war, Mousavi faced multiple assassination attempts orchestrated by Israel.

== Death ==
Mousavi was killed on 25 December 2023, in a targeted Israeli airstrike at his residence in Sayyidah Zaynab, 10 km (6 mi) south of Damascus, amid the Israel–Gaza war. Mousavi's assassination marked the highest-ranking killing of a senior Iranian military official since the targeted assassination of Qasem Soleimani, until the subsequent killing of Mohammad Reza Zahedi in April 2024.

=== Reactions ===
Hours after the incident, the Islamic Revolutionary Guard Corps said in a statement that, "Undoubtedly, the usurping and barbaric Zionist regime will pay for this crime."

Iranian president Ebrahim Raisi called Mousavi's killing "a sign of the Zionist regime's frustration and weakness in the region for which it will certainly pay the price".

Syrian foreign minister Faisal Mekdad also condemned the attack.

Hamas said in a statement that "the assassination of Mousavi in Syrian territory is a crime, violation of Arab sovereignty and it's a cowardly attack [which] threatens the security and stability of the entire region".

In a statement, Lebanon's Hezbollah called Israel's action "clear, shameless aggression and crossing all limits."

Palestinian Islamic Jihad described Israel's assassination of Mousavi as a "cowardly crime".
