= 2016 in Iran =

- Decades: 1990s; 2000s; 2010s; 2020s
- See also: Other events of 2016; Years in Iran

== Incumbents ==
- Supreme Leader: Ali Khamenei
- President: Hassan Rouhani
- Speaker of Parliament – Ali Larijani
- Chief Justice – Sadeq Larijani

== Events ==
=== January ===
- January 2
  - Iranian protesters ransack and set fire to the Saudi Embassy in Tehran following Saudi Arabia's execution of Shia cleric Nimr al-Nimr.
  - The Prosecutor's Office for Media and Culture in Iran suspends the reformist newspaper Bahar for allegedly publishing propaganda against the regime.
- January 4 – Authorities arrest the professional soccer player Sosha Makani "after photographs published on social media showed him together with several women not wearing the Islamic hijab, as required by Iranian law."
- January 5 – Iran unveils a new underground missile depot, showcasing the Emad liquid-fuel, intermediate-range ballistic missile.
- January 7 – Authorities arrest poet and civil activist Hila Sedighi upon her return from a trip to the United Arab Emirates.
- January 12
  - Iranian naval forces seize and detain two small U.S. vessels which "allegedly drifted into Iranian territorial waters." The 10 American sailors are held at an Iranian military base on Farsi Island and released the following day with their boats.
  - Reformist journalist Reyhaneh Tabatabaei begins serving a one-year prison term at Tehran's Evin Prison for allegedly "spreading propaganda against the regime" through her journalistic activities.
- January 16
  - After the IAEA confirms that Iran met the relevant requirements under the Joint Comprehensive Plan of Action (JCPOA), all nuclear-related sanctions are lifted by the UN, the EU, and the United States as part of "Implementation Day."
  - The Guardian Council disqualifies approximately 60% of the more than 12,000 candidates, including 99% of all reformist candidates, from running for office in the 2016 Iranian parliamentary elections to be held on February 26.
- January 20 – "Iranian blogger and activist Hossein Ronaghi-Maleki return[s] to Evin Prison... to continue his 15-year sentence, despite his continuing ill health."

=== February ===
- February 3 – Authorities arrest former BBC journalist and dual Iranian-British citizen Bahman Daroshafaei.
- February 10 – Iranian state television broadcasts new images and video of a U.S. sailor crying in custody from the incident in which Iran detained 10 American sailors on January 12. In response, the U.S. Navy says, "The detention of our personnel was outrageous and unacceptable."
- February 11 – Tens of thousands of Iranians chanting "Death to America and Israel" commemorate the 37th anniversary of the country's 1979 Islamic revolution.
- February 26 – Parliament and Assembly of Experts elections take place. It resulted in the reformists and moderates uniting and being elected in joint lists to have a majority over the conservatives in both the Parliament and the Assembly of Experts.

== Predicted and Scheduled Events ==
=== August ===
- August 5–21 – 30 athletes from Iran will compete in the 2016 Summer Olympics in Rio de Janeiro, Brazil

== See also ==
- List of executions in Iran in 2016
