= 2020 in Iran =

- Decades: 2000s; 2010s; 2020s
- See also: Other events of 2020; Years in Iran

Events in the year 2020 in Iran.

== Incumbents ==
- Supreme Leader of Iran: Ali Khamenei
- President of Iran: Hassan Rouhani
- Chairman of the Parliament: Ali Larijani (until 28 May), Mohammad Bagher Ghalibaf (from 28 May)
- Judiciary System of Iran: Ebrahim Raisi

== Events ==
=== January ===
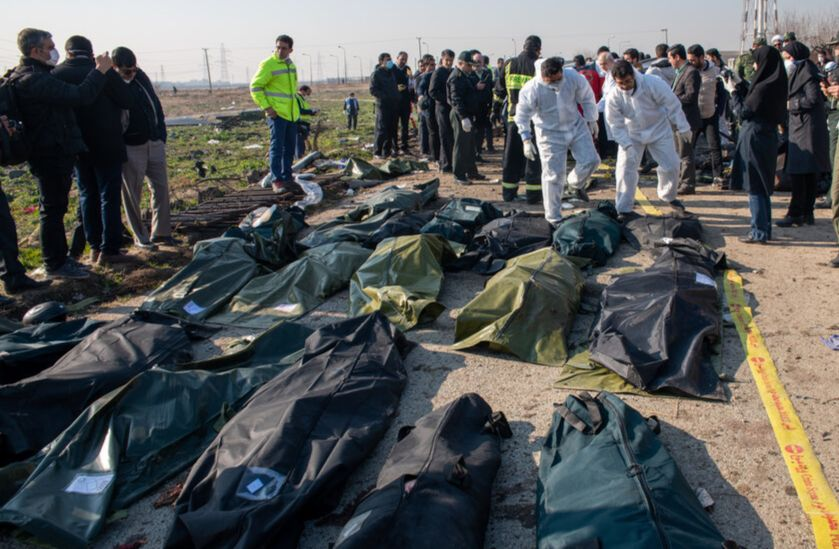
Ukraine International Airlines Flight 752

- January 3 – A U.S. coordinated airstrike near Baghdad International Airport kills Iranian military leader Qasem Soleimani.
- January 7 – A stampede at the burial procession of Qasem Soleimani killed at least 56 people and injured over 200.
- January 8
  - Ballistic missiles from Iran strike two United States military bases in Iraq.
  - Ukraine International Airlines Flight 752 crashes after being shot down by Iranian missiles near Tehran shortly after take-off with 176 passengers and crew on board. All 176 passengers and crew died.
- January 9 – A bus crashes in Mazandaran province, killing at least 20 passengers and injuring 24 others.
- January 11 – the British Ambassador to Iran is arrested and released shortly after.
- January 12
  - Hundreds of Iranians attend anti-government protest after government admits shooting down a Ukrainian airplane due to human error.
  - Kimia Alizadeh, who won a bronze medal in Taekwondo during the 2016 Summer Olympics, has defected to an undisclosed country. It is unclear if she will compete in the 2020 Summer Olympics
- January 22
  - Masked gunmen kill local security leader, Abdolhossein Mojaddami, head of a unit of the Revolutionary Guard.

=== February ===
- 19 February – The first case of COVID-19 is confirmed in Qom, marking the beginning of the pandemic in the country.
- 21 February – Scheduled date for the 2020 Iranian legislative election.
- 23 February – 2020 Khoy earthquake
- 29 February – 43 people have died and 593 are infected with COVID-19.

=== May ===
- 10 May – an anti-ship missile fired from the Iranian frigate Jamaran hit the support vessel Konarak, killing 19 and wounding 15 of the crew of the Konarak.

=== June ===
- 25 June – The first of the 2020 Iran explosions occurs
- 26 June – An explosion occurred at a Shahid Bakeri Industrial Group facility outside of Tehran, which houses the Khojir missile facility.

=== July ===
- 2 July – The Natanz incident occurred, wherein the centrifuge assembly center at the Natanz nuclear site was destroyed.

=== December ===
- 3 December – Iran surpasses 1 million cases of COVID-19.

== Deaths ==
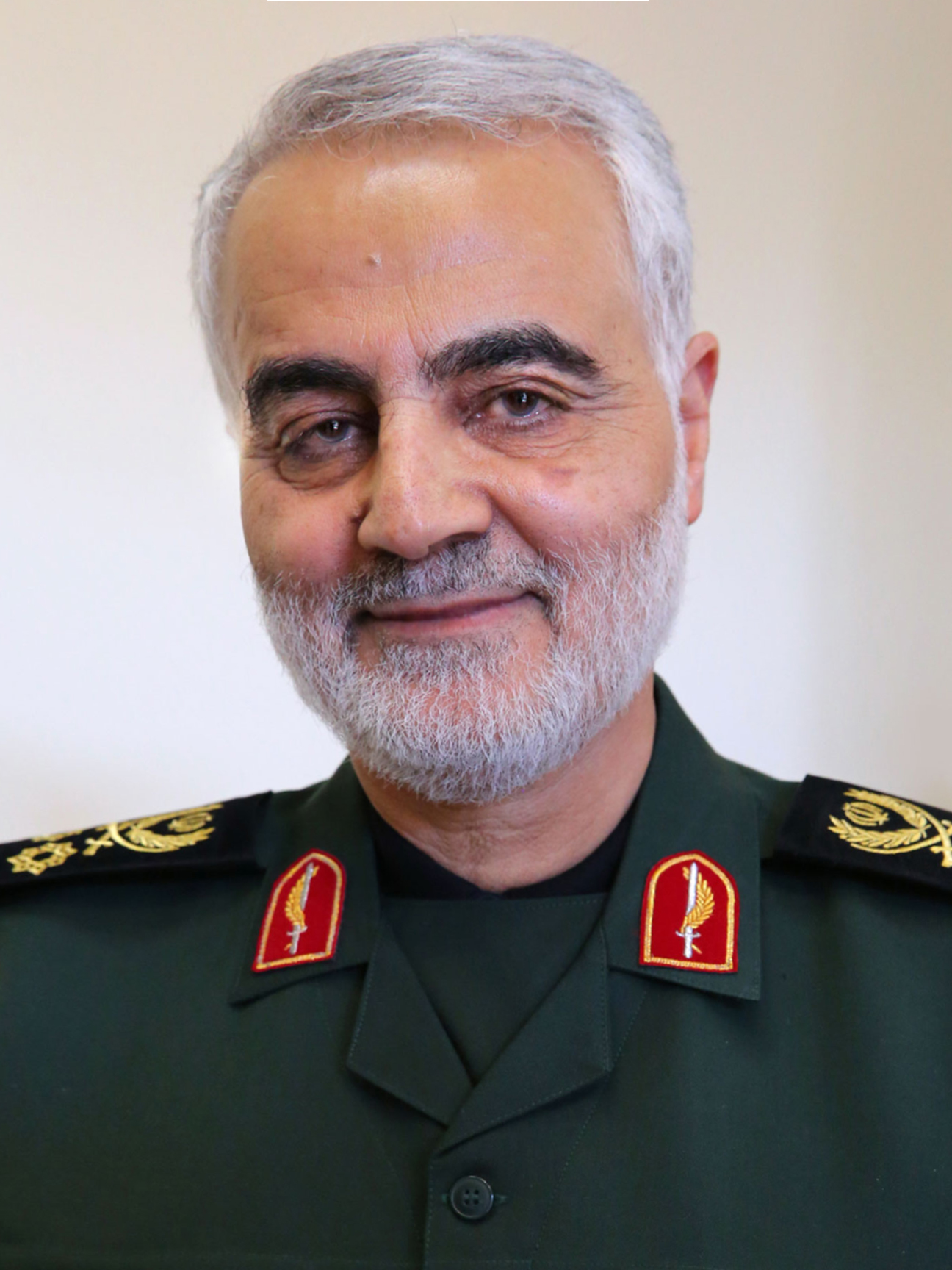
Qasem Soleimani

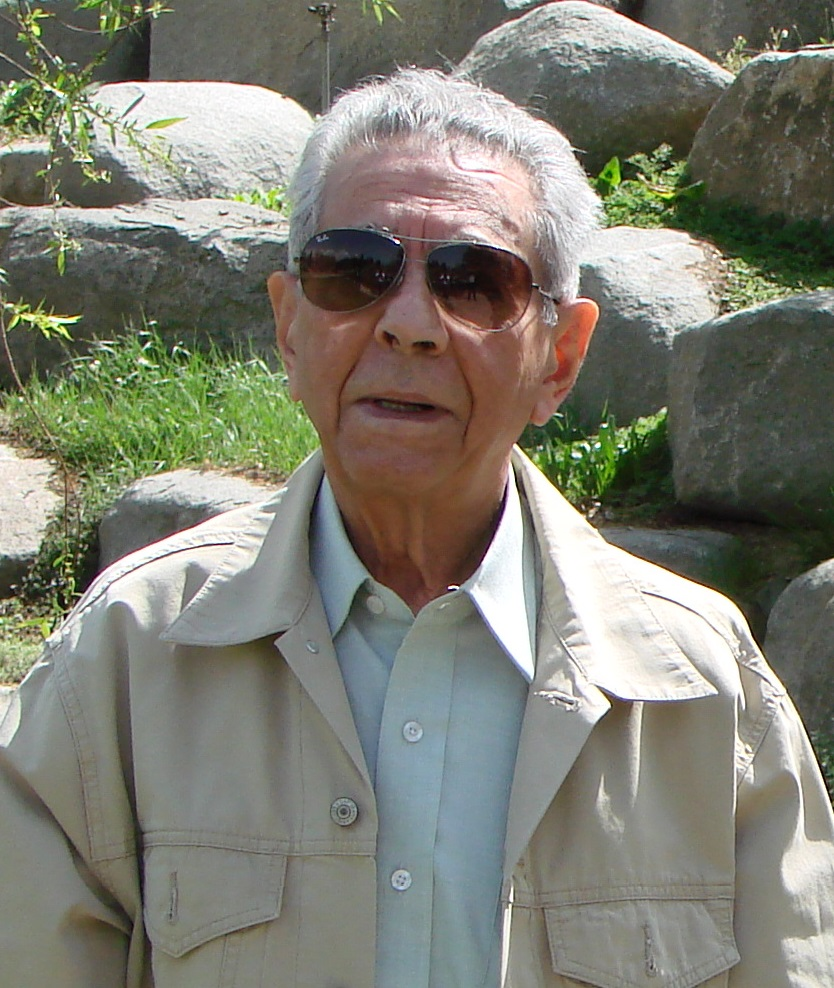
Eskandar Firouz

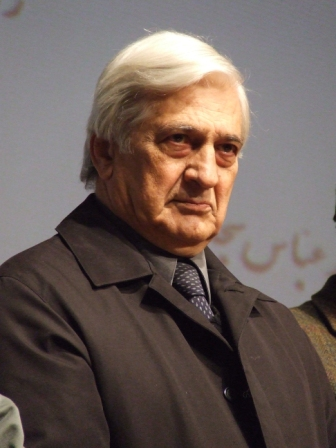
Houshang Zarif

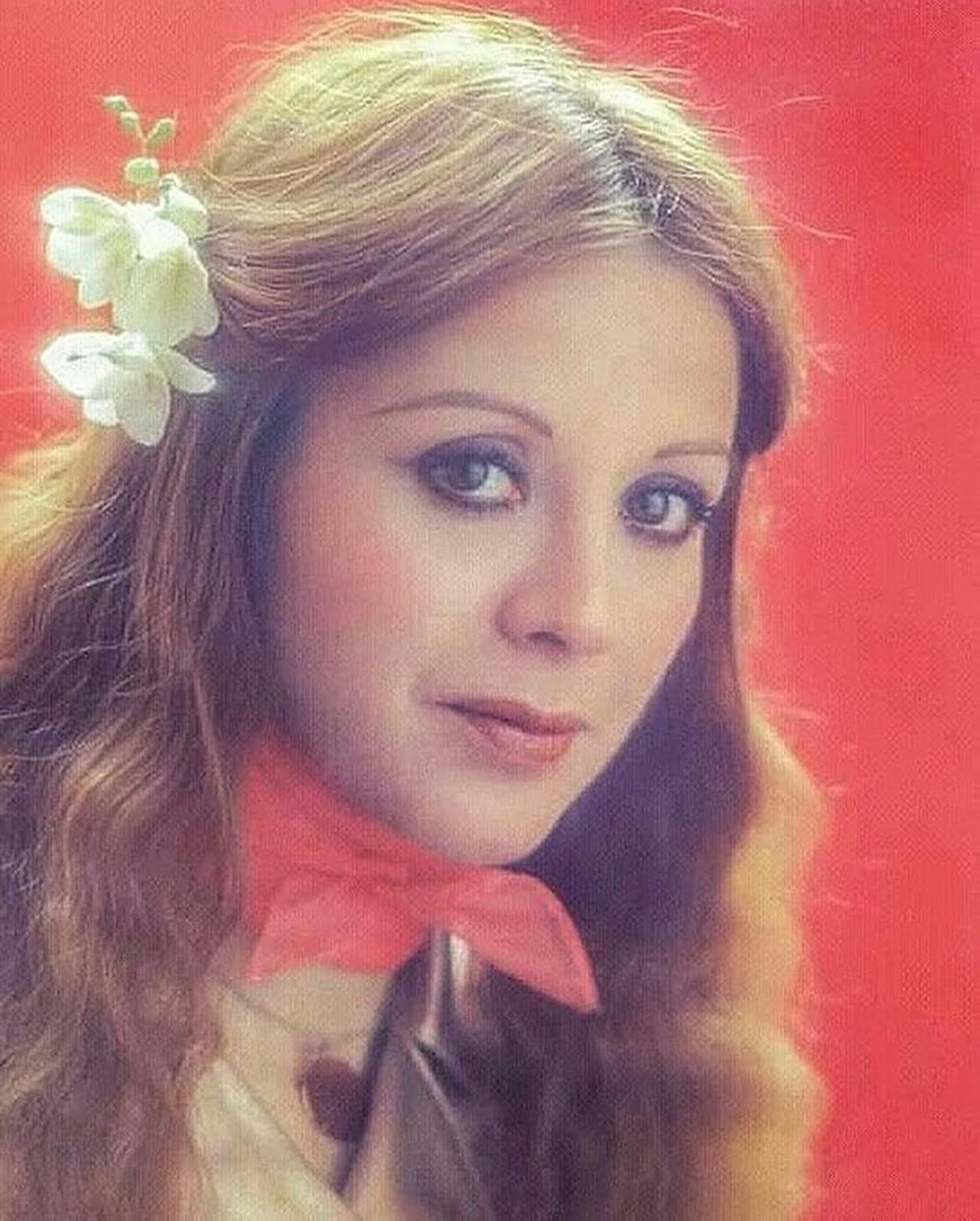
Farzaneh Taidi

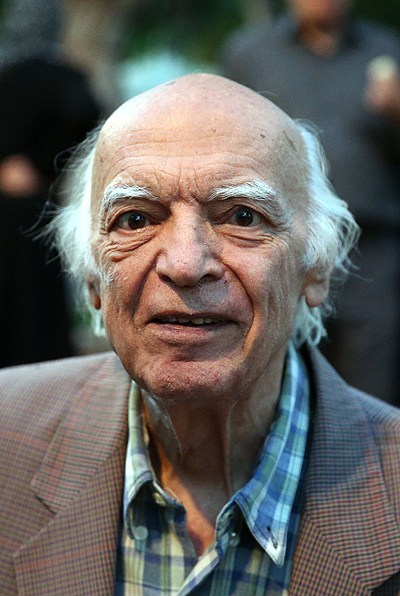
Najaf Daryabandari

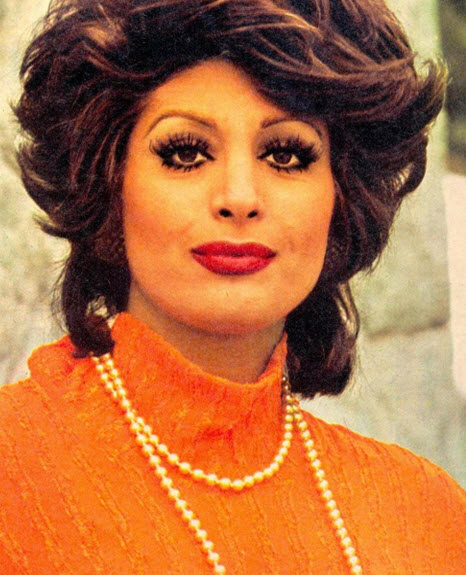
Marjan

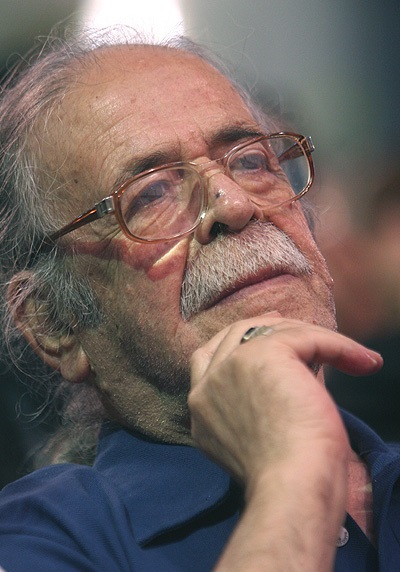
Mohammad-Ali Keshavarz

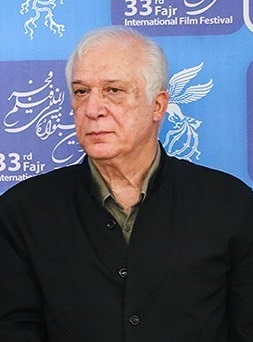
Khosrow Sinai

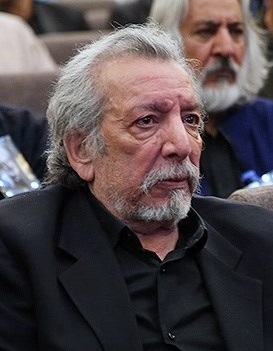
Bahman Mofid

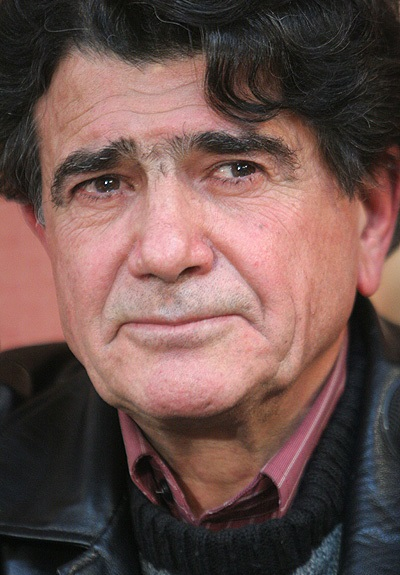
Mohammad Reza Shajarian

- 3 January – Qasem Soleimani, 62, major general, commander of the Quds Force (b. 1957)
- 19 February – Yervand Manaryan, 95, actor (b. 1924)
- 27 February – Hadi Khosroshahi, 81, cleric and diplomat (b. 1939)
- 28 February
  - Mahmoud Khayami, 90, industrialist and philanthropist (b. 1930)
  - Malakeh Ranjbar, 81, actress, (b. 1939)
- 1 March – Siamand Rahman, 31, powerlifter, paralympic champion (b. 1988)
- 3 March – Ahmad NikTalab, 85, poet, author, and linguistic (b. 1934)
- 5 March – Hossein Sheikholesam, 67, politician, (b. 1952)
- 4 March – Eskandar Firouz, 93, environmentalist and politician (b. 1926)
- 7 March
  - Fatemeh Rahbar, 55, politician, member-elect of the parliament, (b. 1964)
  - Houshang Zarif, 81, tar player, heart failure (b. 1938)
- 13 March – Nasser Shabani, 62–63, brigadier general, commander of the Islamic Revolutionary Guard Corps (b. 1957)
- 15 March – Mohammad Ami-Tehrani, 84, olympic weightlifter (b. 1935)
- 16 March –
  - Hashem Bathaie Golpayenagi, 78–79, cleric, member of the Assembly of Experts (b. 1941)
  - Fariborz Raisdana, 75, economist (b. 1948)
- 19 March – Hamid Kohram, 61–62, politician (b. 1958)
- 22 March – Behrouz Rahbar, 74, olympic racing cyclist (b. 1945)
- 23 March – Hassan Akbarzadeh, 93, researcher and mathematician (b. 1927)
- 24 March – Abbasgholi Daneshvar, 95, physician and surgeon (b. 1925)
- 25 March –
  - Edman Ayvazyan, 87, painter (b. 1932)
  - Farzaneh Taidi, 74, actress (b. 1945)
- 27 March – Daniel Gevargiz, 79, olympic weightlifter (b. 1940)
- 30 March – Kioumars Darembakhsh, 74, writer and photographer (b. 1945)
- 5 April – Homayoun Khosravi, 66, musician (b. 1953)
- 11 April – Pari Mansouri, 85, writer and translator (b. 1935)
- 15 April – Siamak Shayeghi, 65, film director and producer (b. 1954)
- 24 April – Ebrahim Amini, 94, cleric and politician, member of the Assembly of Experts (b. 1925)
- 26 April – Abolfazl Salabi, 95, basketball player (b. 1924)
- 4 May – Najaf Daryabandari, 90, writer (b. 1929)
- 16 May – Hossein Kazempour Ardebili, 67–6, politician and diplomat (b. 1952)
- 25 May – Sedigheh Kianfar, 87, actress (b. 1933)
- 5 June – Marjan, 71, singer and actress (b. 1948)
- 6 June – Mehdi Nikbakht, 40, poet and daf player (b. 1970)
- 9 June – Parviz Aboutaleb, 77–78, footballer and coach (b. 1942)
- 14 June – Mohammad-Ali Keshavarz, 90, actor (b. 1930)
- 19 June – Alborz Zarei, 38, climber and environmentalist (b. 1982)
- 19 June – Gholamreza Mansouri, 54, judge (b. 1966)
- 27 June – David Stronach, 89, archaeologist of ancient Iran (b. 1931)
- 1 July – Sirous Gorjestani, 75, actor (b. 1944)
- 8 July – Houshang Seddigh, 72, pilot and commander of the Air Force (b. 1948)
- 14 July – Abolghasem Sarhaddizadeh, 75, politician (b. 1945)
- 18 July – Ali Mirzaei, 91, weightlifter (b. 1929)
- 18 July – Saeed Ghaemmaghami, 76, journalist (b. 1944)
- 20 July – Ahmad Pourmokhber, 79, actor (b. 1940)
- 28 July – Badr al-Zamān Qarīb, 90, linguist (b. 1929)
- 1 August – Khosrow Sinai, 79, film director (b. 1941)
- 3 August – Mohammad Reza Navaei, 71, wrestler (b. 1948)
- 7 August – Mahchehreh Khalili, 43, actress (b. 1977)
- 16 August – Bahman Mofid, 78, actor (b. 1942)
- 18 August – Mohammad-Ali Taskhiri, 75, cleric and politician, member of the Assembly of Experts (b. 1944)
- 25 August – Ruhollah Hosseinian, 64, cleric and politician (b. 1956)
- 27 August – Siah Armajani, 81, sculptor and architect (b. 1939)
- 29 August – Serjik Teymourian, 46, footballer (b. 1974)
- 31 August – Farhad Ahmadi, 69, architecture (b. 1950)
- 12 September – Yousef Saanei, 82, cleric (b. 1937)
- 12 September – Navid Afkari, 26–27, wrestler (b. 1993)
- 18 September – Talat Basari, 97, writer and academic (b. 1923)
- 30 September – Abbas Javanmard, 91, actor and director (b. 1928)
- 1 October – Manouchehr Ashtiani, 89, sociologist (b. 1929)
- 6 October – Nosratollah Vahdat, 95, actor and director (b. 1925)
- 8 October – Mohammad Reza Shajarian, 80, singer (b. 1940)
- 12 October – Sadegh Malek Shahmirzadi, 80, archaeologist (b. 1940)
- 13 October – Akbar A'lami, 75, TV presenter (b. 1944)
- 16 October – Gholam-Abbas Tavassoli, 85, sociologist (b. 1935)
- 18 October – Laleh Bakhtiar, 82, translator (b. 1938)
- 24 October – Abbas Moayeri, 81, painter (b. 1939)
- 29 October – Karim Akbari Mobarakeh, 67, actor (b. 1953)
- 31 October – Jalal Malaksha, 69, poet (b. 1951)
- 8 November – Heidar Shonjani, 74, swimmer (b. 1945)
- 10 November – Mahmoud Yavari, 81, football coach (b. 1939)
- 10 November – Amir Yavari, 88, boxer (b. 1931)
- 22 November – Changiz Jalilvand, 82, dubler (b. 1938)
- 24 November – Kambuzia Partovi, 65, film director (b. 1955)
- 24 November – Mohammad Khadem, 85, wrestler (b. 1935)
- 27 November – Parviz Poorhosseini, 79, actor (b. 1941)
- 27 November – Mohsen Fakhrizadeh, 59, physician (b. 1961)
- 28 November – Mohammad-Ali Shahidi, 71, cleric and politician (b. 1949)
- 29 November – Ramesh, 74, singer and actress (b. 1946)
- 1 December – Ali-Asghar Shahbazi, 98, actor (b. 1922)
- 1 December – Mohammad Maleki, 87, writer and human rights activist (b. 1933)
- 9 December – Mohammad Yazdi, 89, cleric and politician (b. 1931)
- 12 December – Ruhollah Zam, 42, journalist (b. 1978)
