= 2014 in Iran =

- Decades: 1990s; 2000s; 2010s; 2020s
- See also: Other events of 2014; Years in Iran

Events in the year 2014 in the Islamic Republic of Iran.

== Incumbents ==
- Supreme Leader – Ali Khamenei
- President – Hassan Rouhani
- Vice President – Eshaq Jahangiri
- Speaker of Parliament – Ali Larijani
- Chief Justice – Sadeq Larijani

== Events ==
=== January ===
- January 18 – An Iranian diplomat is killed in Yemen's capital Sana'a when he resisted gunmen who were trying to kidnap him near the ambassador's residence.
- January 20
  - The United States rejects the invitation of Iran by the United Nations in peace talks involving Syria.
  - Certain sanctions against Iran are lifted by the European Union and the United States through a nuclear deal.
  - Implementation of the six-month Geneva interim agreement on the Iranian nuclear program begins.
- January 30 – Mohammad-Ali Najafi resigns as Head of Iran's Cultural Heritage, Handcrafts and Tourism Organization, marking the first change in President Rouhani's cabinet.

=== February ===
- February 9 – Iranian officials say that two Iranian Navy warships will be travelling very close to the United States' maritime border in the Atlantic Ocean.
- February 9 – Iran agrees to a United Nations plan to address suspicions that they are working on designing an atomic weapon.
- February 17 – Iran's ambassador to Russia says that Russia could build a second reactor at Iran's Bushehr nuclear power plant in exchange for Iranian oil, under an oil-for-goods deal being negotiated that has alarmed the United States.

=== March ===
- March 5 – The Israel Defense Forces captures an Iranian ship carrying long-range artillery rockets to Palestinians in the Gaza Strip.

=== May ===
- May 21 – Six Iranians that were arrested have been released in Tehran after releasing a fan video set to Pharrell Williams' "Happy", sparking outcries over the internet.
- May 22 – Negotiations between Iran and Russia regarding the building of two additional nuclear reactors at Iran's Bushehr power plant take place.
- May 24 – Mahafarid Amir Khosravi is executed for masterminding the largest fraud case in Iran since the 1979 Revolution.

=== June ===
- June 2 – A massive dust storm strikes Tehran.
- June 30 – British-Iranian women's rights activist Ghoncheh Ghavami is arrested after being briefly detained on June 20 for attempting to attend a volleyball match between Iran and Italy. Women are forbidden to attend large sporting events in Iran. Her detention in Evin Prison continues.

=== July ===
- July 22 – The Washington Post reporter Jason Rezaian and his wife Yeganeh Salehi, a correspondent for The National, are arrested by Iranian authorities. The authorities have not disclosed their whereabouts or welfare, or the reason for their detention.

=== August ===
- August 10 – Sepahan Airlines Flight 5915 crashes in Tehran.
- August 18 – The 6.2 M_{w} Murmuri earthquake shook western Iran with a maximum Mercalli intensity of VIII (Severe), injuring 60–330 people.
- August 30 – An Iranian man, Soheil Arabi, is sentenced to death for "insulting the Prophet"
- An Iranian doctor named Nasser Fahimi was sentenced to 10 years in prison by the Iranian judiciary on charges of acting against the country.

=== September ===
- September 1 – Mohammad Reza Rahimi, former Iranian vice president, is convicted to a prison term for his role in the 2011 embezzlement scandal.
- September 5 – Iranian air traffic control requires a plane chartered by US-led coalition forces in Afghanistan to land over issues with the flight plan. The flight later resumes without further incident.

== Notable deaths ==
- January 27 – Hashem Shabani, executed prisoner
- June 1 – Gholamreza Khosravi Savadjani, executed prisoner
- August 19 – Simin Behbahani, prominent poet
- October 15 – Abd al-Hussein al-Salihi, Iranian-Iraqi historian and religious writer.
- October 21 – Mohammad-Reza Mahdavi Kani, politician
- October 25 – Reyhaneh Jabbari, convicted and executed for the murder of her alleged rapist
- November 14 – Morteza Pashaei, pop singer, composer and musician
- November 16 – Babak Ghorbani, wrestler
- November 19 – Gholam Hossein Mazloumi, footballer
- December 21 – Morteza Ahmadi, actor
- December 24 - Nima Varasteh, Musician
- December 27 – Brigadier General Hamid Taqavi, the highest ranking Iranian military official to die in Iraq amid the Iranian military intervention in that country

== See also ==
- My Stealthy Freedom
