= 2013 in Iran =

- Decades: 1990s; 2000s; 2010s; 2020s
- See also: Other events of 2013; Years in Iran

The following lists events that happened during 2013 in the Islamic Republic of Iran.

== Incumbents ==
- Supreme Leader – Ali Khamenei
- President – Mahmoud Ahmadinejad (2005–2013)
- President – Hassan Rouhani (2013–2021)
- Vice President – Mohammad Reza Rahimi (2009-2013)
- Vice President – Eshaq Jahangiri (2013-2021)
- Speaker of Parliament – Ali Larijani
- Chief Justice – Sadeq Larijani

== Events ==
=== January ===
- January 28 - Iran's state news agency announces that a monkey was sent successfully into space by the Iranian Space Agency and returned safely aboard the Pishgam rocket.

=== February ===
- February 3 - Iran indicates the possibility it will attend talks on its nuclear program in Kazakhstan if it believes intentions behind them are "authentic".

=== March ===
- March 2 - Giti Pasand Isfahan winner 2012–13 Iranian Futsal Super League .

=== June ===
- June 13 - Hassan Rouhani is elected as the seventh president of Iran.

=== November ===
- November 24 - Iran and six world powers reach an interim nuclear accord that sees Iran limit aspects of its nuclear program in exchange for sanctions relief.

== Notable deaths ==
- January 1 - Mojtaba Tehrani, 79, Iranian Twelver Marja'.
- January 17 - Homayoun Khorram, 82, Iranian violinist, colorectal cancer.
- January 31 - Hassan Habibi, 76, Iranian politician and scholar, Minister of Justice (1985–1989); First Vice President (1989–2001), heart attack.
- February 21 - Nazem Ganjapour, 69, Iranian footballer.
- February 24 - Farideh Lashai, 68, Iranian contemporary artist, cancer.
- March 31 - Ahmad Sayyed Javadi, 95, Iranian political activist and politician, Minister of Justice (1979), Minister of Interior (1979).
- April 1 - Asal Badiee, 35, Iranian actress.
- April 17 - Dariush Safvat, 85, Iranian musician, natural causes.
- April 20 - Hassan Alavikia, 102, Iranian spy chief.
- May 9 - Sadegh Tirafkan, 47, Iranian contemporary artist.
- May 14 - Mohammad Ezodin Hosseini Zanjani, 92, Iranian Islamic prelate, Grand Ayatollah, complications from surgery.
- June 2 - Jalal Al-Din Taheri, 87, Iranian Islamic cleric.
- June 16 - Yousef Madani Tabrizi, 85, Iranian Grand Ayatollah.
- June 17 - Jalil Shahnaz, 92, Iranian maestro and Tar master, natural causes.
- June 21 - Abdol-Aziz Mirza Farmanfarmaian, 93, Iranian architect.
- June 25 - Taghi Rouhani, 93, Iranian news anchor.
- July 16 - Hassan Pakandam, 79, Iranian Olympic boxer (1964) and team captain.
- August 23 - Nasser Sharify, 87, Iranian academic and librarian.
- August 30 - Lotfi Mansouri, 84, Iranian opera director (Canadian Opera Company, San Francisco Opera).
- September 7 - Mehdi Mohammadi, 60, Iranian football player and coach, heart attack.
- October 10 - Kazem Sarikhani, 35, Iranian Olympic judoka (2000), Asian champion (2000), brain damage.
- October 19 - Mahmoud Zoufonoun, 93, Iranian traditional musician, Alzheimer's disease.
- November 5 - Habibollah Asgaroladi, 81, Iranian politician and presidential candidate, Leader of Islamic Coalition Party (1998–2008), lung problems.
- November 10 - Safdar Rahmat Abadi, Iranian government official, deputy industry minister, shot.
- December 18 - Büyük Jeddikar, 84, Iranian footballer (Esteghlal F.C., national team), Alzheimer's disease.
