= 2012 in Iran =

- Decades: 1990s; 2000s; 2010s; 2020s
- See also: Other events of 2012; Years in Iran

Events in the year 2012 in the Islamic Republic of Iran.

== Incumbents ==
- Supreme Leader – Ali Khamenei
- President – Mahmoud Ahmadinejad
- Vice President – Mohammad Reza Rahimi
- Speaker of Parliament – Ali Larijani
- Chief Justice – Sadeq Larijani

== Events ==
- January 9 – Iranian authorities sentence Amir Mirza Hekmati, a U.S. citizen of Iranian descent, to death on espionage charges.
- March 2 – Iranian parliamentary elections for the 9th Islamic Consultative Assembly were held.
- March 12 – Ali Daei, Iran's football legend and the world's all-time leading goalscorer, is rushed to hospital following a serious car accident.
- March 26 – Somali pirates hijack an Iranian-owned cargo ship with 23 crew in waters off the Maldives.
- April 14 – Iran and world powers, including the United States, Russia, and China, begin talks about Iran's nuclear program.
- April 23 – Iran's oil ministry and its National Iranian Oil Company suffers a malware attack by a computer virus.
- May 1 – Egypt security services foil an alleged Iranian plot to kill the Saudi ambassador in Cairo.
- May 5 – Voters in Iran go to the polls for the second round of legislative elections.
- May 12 – President of Iran Mahmoud Ahmadinejad calls Israel "nothing more than a mosquito" and downplays the idea of war between the two countries, ahead of talks regarding Iran's nuclear program.
- May 15 – Majid Jamali Fashi, convicted of killing Iranian quantum field theorist and elementary-particle physicist Masoud Alimohammadi, is executed.
- June 11 – Ali Larijani is sworn in as Chairman of the Parliament of Iran for another term.
- June 24 – The United States admits that it infected Iranian computers with Spyware.
- June 28 – Vice President of Iran Mohammad-Reza Rahimi delivers an antisemitic speech at a United Nations conference on the illegal drug trade saying that a central Jewish text, the Talmud, was responsible for the spread of illegal drugs around the world; his speech draws condemnation from U.N. and the European Union diplomats.
- July 2 – Officials in Kenya say that two Iranian Islamic Revolutionary Guards arrested with explosives planned to attack Israeli, American, British and Saudi Arabian targets inside Kenya.
- July 4 – Two Iranian suspects held by Kenyan police reportedly confess that they planned to detonate a series of 30 bombs simultaneously across Kenya.
- July 17 – United States President Barack Obama announces additional sanctions against Iran for its nuclear program.
- August 4 – Iran claims to have successfully test fired a fourth generation Fateh-110 missile.
- August 11 – Two earthquakes, the strongest a magnitude 6.4, strike near the northwestern Iranian cities of Tabriz and Ahar, killing at least 250 people and injuring up to 1,800 others.
- August 21 – Iran unveils a new version of a short range surface-to-surface ballistic missile, named the Fateh-110 or Conqueror, and five pieces of military hardware.
- August 26 – Heads of state meet at the 16th Summit of the Non-Aligned Movement in Tehran, Iran, until August 31.
- August 30 – The International Atomic Energy Agency releases a report on the Nuclear program of Iran, stating that Iran has doubled its number of centrifuges at the Fordow facility and highlighting concern over the nuclear program.
- August 30 – Iran and Egypt describe each other as "strategic allies" at the 16th Summit of the Non-Aligned Movement in Iran.
- September 7 – Canada closes its embassy in Iran and orders all Iranian diplomatic staff out of Canada, citing Iran's support for Syrian President Bashar al-Assad, Iran's "among the worst" human rights record, its lack of respect for the Vienna conventions, its nuclear program and the security of Canadian diplomatic personnel. It sees Iran as the world's "most significant threat to global peace and security." Minister of foreign affairs Baird says the Canadian government files Iran as a "state sponsor of terrorism" under the Canadian Justice for Victims of Terrorism Act.
- September 23 – Iran blocks use of the Google search engine, as it prepares to switch its citizens to a domestic internet network.
- October 11 – Hezbollah leader Hassan Nasrallah confirms that the drone aircraft shot down over Israel's Negev Desert on 6 October belonged to the organization and was supplied by Iran.
- November 9 – Two Iranian Revolutionary Guard fighter jets fire on an unmanned American General Atomics MQ-1 Predator drone in international airspace near Kuwait.

== Notable deaths ==
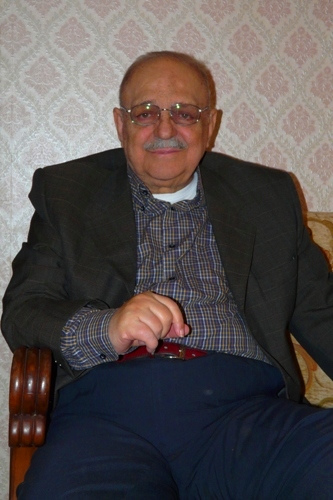
Hassan Kassai

- January 11 – Mostafa Ahmadi-Roshan, Iranian nuclear scientist.
- January 13 – Abdollah Mojtabavi, Iranian wrestler.
- March 8 – Simin Daneshvar, Iranian writer and academic
- March 18 -Jalal Zolfonun, Iranian setar player and composer
- April 5 -Abd al-Rahim Aqiqi Bakhshayishi, religious writer, journalist and translator.
- May 6 – Iraj Ghaderi, Iranian film director and actor.
- May 23 – Sattareh Farmanfarmaian, Iranian writer and princess.
- May 30 – Farideh Mashini, Iranian feminist activist.
- June 14 – Hassan Kassai, Iranian musician.
- July 12 – Hamid Samandarian, Iranian film and theater director.
- July 19 – Mohammad Hassan Ganji, Iranian meteorologist and academic.
- October 22 – Ahmad Ghabel, Iranian religious scholar and political dissident.
- November 3 – Sattar Beheshti, blogger tortured to death by the Iranian Cyber Police
- November 22 – Fahimeh Rastkar, Iranian actress and dubbing artist.
- December 2 – Ehsan Naraghi, Iranian sociologist and writer, Director of UNESCO's Youth Division (1980–1996).
- December 3 – Amir Mahmud Anvar Iranian literary academic and poet (born 1945)
- December 10 – Khalil Omrani, Iranian poet.
- Full date unknown:
  - Daniel Mahgerefteh, a murdered Iranian Jewish man
