= 2011 in Iran =

- Decades: 1990s; 2000s; 2010s; 2020s
- See also: Other events of 2011; Years in Iran

Events in the year 2011 in the Islamic Republic of Iran.

== Incumbents ==
- Supreme Leader: Ali Khamenei
- President: Mahmoud Ahmadinejad
- Vice President: Mohammad Reza Rahimi
- Speaker of Parliament: Ali Larijani
- Chief Justice: Sadeq Larijani

== Events ==
- January 7 – Dozens of Christians in Iran are arrested, after security forces forcibly entered their homes and verbally and physically abused them, in a crackdown on converts from Islam and evangelical groups, which an Iranian official who confirmed the arrests called an "enemy cultural invasion."
- January 9 – Iran Air Flight 277 crashes with 100 people on board near Orumiyeh in the northeast of the country; at least 50 survive.
- January 10 – Iranian human-rights lawyer Nasrin Sotoudeh is sentenced to 11 years in prison and banned from practicing law or traveling for 20 years; France condemns the punishment as "deeply shocking" and called for the release of Sotoudeh and another activist, Shiva Nazar-Ahari, who was sentenced to four years in prison and 74 lashes.
- January 23 – President of Iran Mahmoud Ahmadinejad designed Ali Akbar Salehi, then acting Foreign Minister to the Parliament to succeed Manouchehr Mottaki who was dismissed on December.
- February 1 – In the wake of several recent deadly plane crashes in Iran, the Parliament of Iran passes a vote of no confidence in the country's Minister of Roads and Transportation Hamid Behbahani and impeaches him.
- February 11 – Iran marks the 32nd anniversary of its Revolution.
- February 11 – Iranian opposition leader Mehdi Karroubi is placed under house arrest after calling for demonstrations in support of the uprisings in Egypt and Tunisia.
- February 13 – Opposition leaders in Iran call for nationwide anti-government rallies on Monday, in attempts to mimic the recent Tunisian and Egyptian revolutions.
- February 15 – Iranian politicians call for the execution of opposition leaders.
- February 22 – The Iran Navy sends two ships through the Suez Canal for the first time since the 1979 Iranian Revolution.
- February 28 – Iran confirms that it is holding two Opposition leaders Mir-Hossein Mousavi and Mehdi Karroubi under house arrest.
- March 15 – The Israeli Navy intercepts the cargo ship Victoria which was carrying a long list of advanced weapons that were smuggled from Iran and were allegedly bound for the militant organizations operating in the Gaza Strip.
- March 25 – The Government of Iran rejects a United Nations Human Rights Council investigation into alleged human rights abuses.
- May 6 – Iran's supreme leader Ayatollah Ali Khamenei issues an ultimatum to the President Mahmoud Ahmadinejad to accept his intervention in a cabinet appointment or resign.
- May 15 – Sepahan F.C. won their third championship in Iran Pro League.
- June 1 – Iran's parliament finds that the President of Iran Mahmoud Ahmadinejad acted illegally by appointing himself as Oil Minister.
- June 12 – The United Nations Security Council reports that Iran is buying foreign banks and money-exchange bureaus to sidestep economic sanctions.
- June 12 – 2011 Iranian protests: Iranian authorities disperse and arrest protesters in the capital Tehran marking the second anniversary of the re-election of Mahmoud Ahmadinejad as President.
- June 28 – Iran tests 14 surface-to-surface missiles on the second day of war games.
- July 18 – Iranian athlete and Iran's Strongest Man Rouhollah Dadashi is killed in a fight which started as an argument with another driver and his passengers. Two of them are arrested by police.
- July 23 – Daryoush Rezaei, an Iranian scientist, is shot dead outside his home in Tehran. It was reported that the scientist had links to the country's nuclear programme.
- August 3 – The Iranian parliament confirms four new ministers including Rostam Ghasemi as Minister of Petroleum.
- August 5 – 2011 Syrian uprising: Turkey confirms it has seized an Iranian arms shipment to Syria.
- August 14 – Iran confirms the arrest of the second-in-command of the Kurdistan Workers' Party (PKK), Murat Karayılan, by the country's intelligence agency.
- August 25 – Former Iranian Prime Minister Mir-Hossein Mousavi is hospitalized after a heart attack.
- September 21 – Two American hikers, Shane Bauer and Josh Fattal, are set free on bail by Iran as a humanitarian gesture, after being detained in prison for over two years under allegations of espionage.
- September 27 – CEOs of Iranian Melli Bank and Saderat Bank resign from their positions as a result of $2.6 billion bank fraud.
- October 10 – Iranian actress Marzieh Vafamehr is sentenced to 90 lashes of the cane and a year's jail in Tehran for appearing in the film My Tehran For Sale which criticizes the Government of Iran's harsh policies on the arts.
- October 11 – The US Federal Bureau of Investigation and Drug Enforcement Administration claim to have disrupted an attempt to bomb the Israeli and the Saudi and embassies in Washington DC and an alleged terrorist plot to assassinate the Saudi Arabian ambassador, with possible links to Iran.
- November 12 – Two massive explosions occur at a Revolutionary Guard ammunition depot western of the Iranian capital, Tehran; at least 17 people, including a senior commander, are killed according to Iranian state media.

== Notable deaths ==
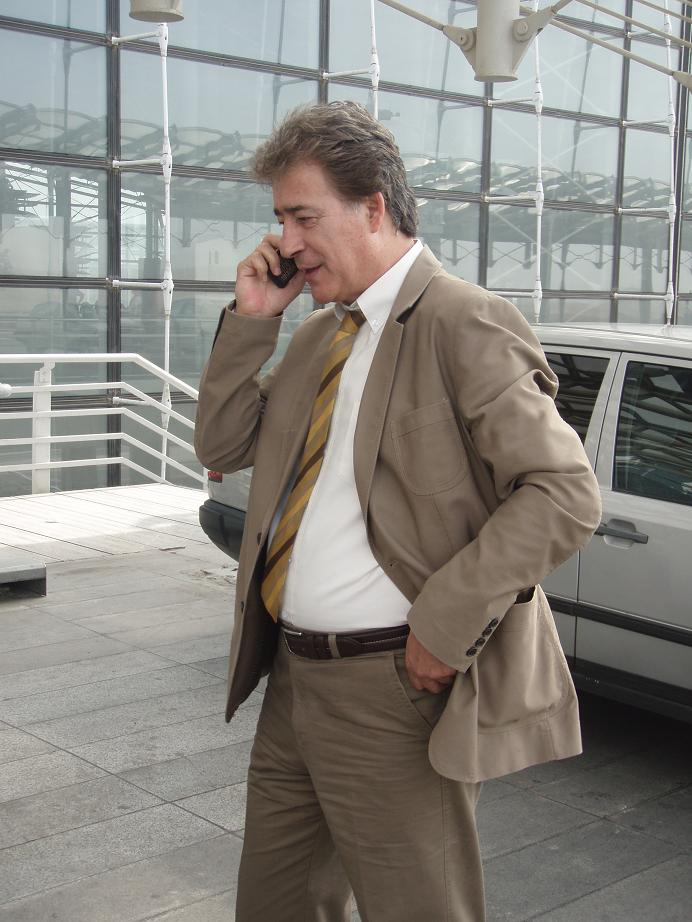
Nasser Hejazi

- January 4 – Ali-Reza Pahlavi, 44, royal, son of Shah Mohammed Reza Pahlavi, suicide by gunshot.
- January 29 – Zahra Bahrami, 45, dual Dutch-Iranian citizen executed on disputed drug trafficking charges.
- February 14 – Sane Jaleh, 26, student, killed in protests
- February 15 – Mohammad Mokhtari, 21, killed in protests
- March 8 – Iraj Afshar, 85, bibliographer, historian, and an iconic figure.
- April 16 – Bijan Pakzad, 67, designer of menswear and fragrances.
- May 23 – Nasser Hejazi, 61, goalkeeper and coach, lung cancer
- May 30 – Ali Mirza Qajar, 81, royal, Head of Qajar Imperial Family, after long illness
- May 31 – Ezatollah Sahabi, 81, politician and party leader, stroke
- June 1 – Haleh Sahabi, 54, democracy activist, cardiac arrest
- June 10 – Hoda Saber, 52, democracy activist, heart attack
- July 16 – Rouhollah Dadashi, 30, athlete, killed in a street fight
- August 10 – Babak Masoumi, 39, futsal player and coach
- October 23 – Nusrat Bhutto, 82, Iranian born Pakistani first lady, alzheimer's disease
- October 30 – Abbas-Ali Amid Zanjani, 74, cleric and politician, heart attack
- November 19 – Hassan Tehrani Moghaddam, IRGC commander killed in the Bidganeh explosion

== See also ==
- 2011 Iranian protests
- 2011 executions in Iran
