= 2017 in Iran =

- Decades: 1990s; 2000s; 2010s; 2020s
- See also: Other events of 2017; Years in Iran

Events in the year 2017 in the Islamic Republic of Iran.

== Incumbents ==
- Supreme Leader of Iran: Ali Khamenei
- President of Iran: Hassan Rouhani
- Parliament of Iran: Ali Larijani
- Judiciary System of Iran: Sadeq Larijani

== Events ==
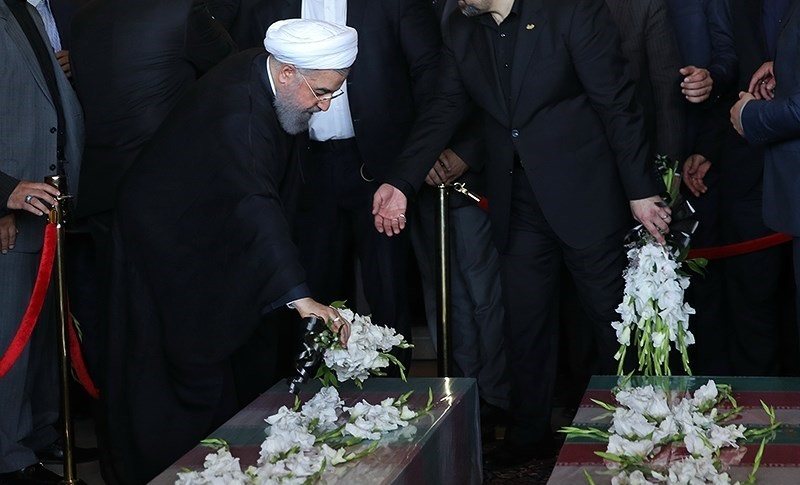
President Hassan Rouhani provides a tribute to the Tehran terrorist attack's victims during the 9 June 2017 funeral.

=== January ===
- January 8 – Akbar Hashemi Rafsanjani, one of the founding fathers of the Islamic Republic who was the fourth President of Iran, dies.
- January 10 – The state funeral of Akbar Hashemi Rafsanjani in Tehran is attended by millions.
- January 19 – The Plasco Building in Tehran, which was once Iran's tallest building, collapses in a fire.

=== May ===
- May 3 – The Zemestan-Yurt coal mine disaster occurs in Golestan province, with forty-two individuals dying.
- May 19 – President Hassan Rouhani wins re-election against rival Ebrahim Raisi in the national elections, with 57.14% of the vote going to Rouhani.

=== June ===
- June 7 – Terrorist attacks in Tehran leaves eighteen civilians killed and fifty-two others injured, with the Islamic State of Iraq and the Levant (ISIL) terrorist group claiming responsibility.
- June 9 – Official state funeral for victims of the Tehran attacks is held and attended by multiple Iranian officials.
- June 10 – ISIL operational commander and mastermind of the terrorist events dies at the hands of security forces.

=== July ===
- July 15 – Maryam Mirzakhani, an Iranian mathematician and a professor of mathematics at Stanford University, dies.
- July 28 – Successful Launch of Simorgh Satellite and opening Emam Khomeini Space Station

=== October ===
- October 2 – Iran nuclear deal cover by Russia official, US ambassador to UN warns, Russia is backing shield prevent passed to an agreement.

=== November ===
- November 12 – A magnitude 7.3 earthquake strikes Iran near the border with Iraq, killing at least 630 people and injuring 8,100 others.

=== December ===
- December 28 – The 2017 Iranian protests begin.
- December 29 – Protesters take to the streets for a second day against the government in several cities.
- December 30 – Two protesters are reportedly shot dead by riot police in Dorud, Lorestan province while protests spread further.
- December 31 – Access to Telegram and Instagram were banned following the rising protests. President Rouhani however acknowledges the discontent of the Iranians.

== Notable deaths ==
- January 8 – Akbar Hashemi Rafsanjani, former President of the Islamic Republic of Iran (born 1934)
- July 15 – Maryam Mirzakhani, was an Iranian mathematician and a professor of mathematics at Stanford University. (born 1977)
