= 2019 in Iran =

- Decades: 1990s; 2000s; 2010s; 2020s
- See also: Other events of 2019; Years in Iran

Events in the year 2019 in Iran.

== Incumbents ==
- Supreme Leader of Iran: Ali Khamenei
- President of Iran: Hassan Rouhani
- Parliament of Iran: Ali Larijani
- Judiciary System of Iran: Sadeq Larijani (until 7 March), Ebrahim Raisi (since 7 March)

== Events ==
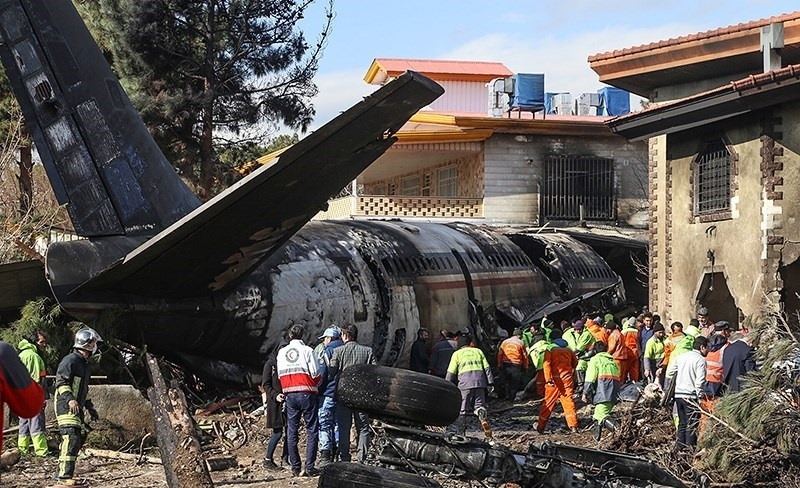
Saha Airlines Boeing 707 crash

- 14 January – 2019 Saha Airlines Boeing 707 crash
- 13 February – 2019 Khash–Zahedan suicide bombing: A suicide bomb attack on a vehicle kills at least 27 Revolutionary Guards in southeastern Iran. It is one of the deadliest terrorist attacks in Iran in years.
- 2 September — Sahar Khodayari (Esteghlal F.C. girl fan) also known as Blue girl; sets herself on fire after being arrested for attending a soccer game. She dies a week later in hospital.
- 10 November - Oil field with an estimated 53 billion barrels of crude discovered in Kuszstan
- Since 15 November - 2019–20 Iranian protests ؛ In Persian: اعتراضات آبان ۱۳۹۸

=== Sports ===
- 2018–19 Persian Gulf Pro League

== Deaths ==
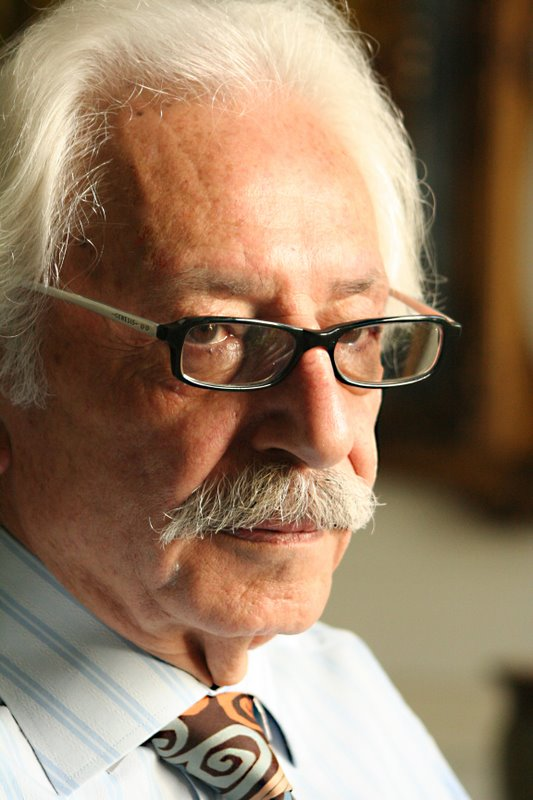
Jamshid Mashayekhi

- 8 January – Khosro Harandi, chess player, the first Iranian International Master (b. 1950).
- 9 January - Bijan Samandar, Iranian poet and musician. (death announced on this date) (b. 1941)
- 29 January – Mohammad Nabi Habibi, politician, Mayor of Tehran 1984–1987 (b. 1945).
- 9 February - Farhad Ebrahimi, Iranian poet and writer. (b. 1935)
- 21 February - Mohammad Momen, Iranian Faqīh and politician. (b. 1938)
- 22 February - Yadollah Samareh, Iranian linguist (b. 1932)
- 20 March - Keyvan Vahdani, Iranian footballer (Paykan), landslide. (b. 1991)
- 2 April - Jamshid Mashayekhi, Iranian actor (Brick and Mirror, The Fateful Day, Abadan). (b. 1934)
- 16 April - Ahmad Eghtedari, Iranian teacher, lawyer and writer, complications from lung and kidney deficiencies. (b. 1925)
- 20 April – Monir Shahroudy Farmanfarmaian, artist (b. 1922).
- 26 April - Nasser Farbod, Iranian political activist and military officer, Chief of Staff (1979). (b. 1922)
- 10 June - Alireza Shir Mohammad Ali, Iranian political prisoner, stabbed. (b. 1998)
- 25 June - Alinaghi Alikhani, 90, Iranian economist and politician, Minister of Economics (1963–1969).
- 26 June - Morteza Saffari Natanzi, Iranian politician, MP (since 2016), pancreatic cancer. (b. 1956)
- 6 July - Parviz Jalayer, 79, Iranian weightlifter, Olympic silver medalist (1968) and Asian Games champion (1966). (b. 1939)
- 8 September — Sahar Khodayari, 29, dies after setting herself on fire.
