= 2018 in Iran =

- Decades: 1990s; 2000s; 2010s; 2020s
- See also: Other events of 2018; Years in Iran

Events in the year 2018 in Iran.

== Incumbents ==
- Supreme Leader of Iran: Ali Khamenei
- President of Iran: Hassan Rouhani
- Parliament of Iran: Ali Larijani
- Judiciary System of Iran: Sadeq Larijani

== Events ==
=== January ===
- January 1 – As protests continue from last year, ten people are killed in the streets overnight.
- January 4 – The United States treasury sanctions five entities associated with Iran's ballistic missiles program.
- January 6 – Thousands of pro-government demonstrators march the streets for the fourth day in a row.
- January 7 – A ban is enforced on teaching the English language in primary schools blaming that on the unrest.
- January 30 – Mehdi Karroubi accuses Ali Khamenei of abuse of power.

=== February ===
- 18 – Iran Aseman Airlines Flight 3704

=== May ===
- May 6 – concern over United States President Donald Trump Iran nuclear deal over sanction that will keeping international oil market on edge, ongoing Venezuela economic crisis, analysts warned that threaten to further crimp production and export. price rose $70 barrel up higher since November 2014.
- May 9 – Iranian Parliament burned America flag called 'death to america' anger over after President Trump United States withdrawal from the Joint Comprehensive Plan of Action.

=== September ===
- 18 September – 21 people are killed and 25 others are injured in a collision between a passenger bus and a trailer carrying flammable materials in Isfahan.

=== November ===
- November 12 Sarpol-e Zahab in Kermanshah province, eastern Iran was hit by an earthquake of 6.3 magnitude, injuring about 700 people.
- November -United Nations’ General Assembly’s Human Rights Committee approved a resolution against Iranian government’s continuous discrimination against women and limitation of freedom of thought.
- November – A group of UN human rights experts including Javid Rehman U.N. Special rapporteur on the situation of human rights in Iran and four others experts concern about Farhad Meysami’s situation who has been on hunger strike since August. He is in jail for opposing compulsory hijab.

=== December ===
- December 1 – Amnesty International asked the government of Iran to bring to light what has happened to the political detainees in the country. Amnesty asked United nations to set up an investigation group to find the facts of crimes against humanity in Iran
- On 27 December 2018 Security forces attacked with tear gas a teachers gathering outside the education office in Isfahan, central Iran. Teachers were protesting their low salary and the arrest of their colleagues who are now in jail.

== Deaths ==
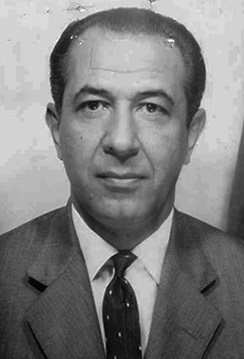
Jahangir Amuzegar

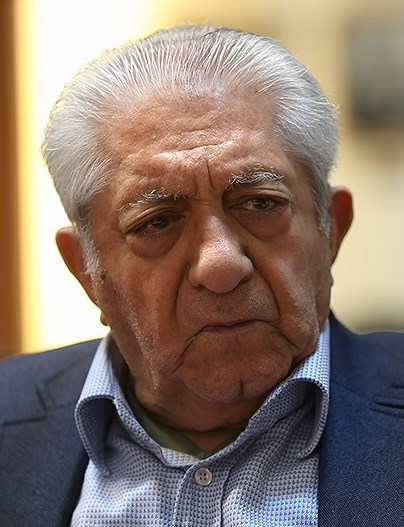
Ezzatolah Entezami

- 2 January – Ali Akbar Moinfar, politician (born 1928).
- 9 January – Reza Sheikholeslami, academic (born 1941)
- 17 January – Jahangir Amuzegar, economist, academic and politician (born 1920)
- 9 March – Ali Asghar Khodadoust, eye surgeon (born 1935)
- 22 March – Dariush Shayegan, philosopher and cultural theorist (born 1935)
- 4 May – Naser Cheshmazar, composer (born 1950)
- 25 May – Naser Malek Motiei, actor (born 1930)
- 9 August – Mehrdad Pahlbod, royal and politician (born 1917)
- 17 August – Ezzatolah Entezami, actor (born 1924)
