= 2010 in Iran =

- Decades: 1990s; 2000s; 2010s; 2020s
- See also: Other events of 2010; Years in Iran

Events in the year 2010 in the Islamic Republic of Iran.

== Incumbents ==
- Supreme Leader: Ali Khamenei
- President: Mahmoud Ahmadinejad
- Vice President: Mohammad Reza Rahimi
- Chief Justice: Sadeq Larijani

== Events ==
- January 5 – Iran bans its citizens from contact with 60 international organisations and media outlets over claims they conspired against the country.
- January 8 – Mehdi Karroubi's car is hit by fire in Qazvin, Iran.
- January 12 – Masoud Alimohammadi, an Iranian nuclear physics professor, is killed in a bomb attack in the capital Tehran; Iran state media accuses Israel and the United States of involvement.
- January 19 – Iran rejects a deal offered by the International Atomic Energy Agency to exchange low-enriched uranium for nuclear fuel.
- January 23 – A passenger train in Iran derails, killing at least eight people and wounding at least fifteen others.
- January 24 – Taban Air Flight 6437: A flight operated by Kolavia on behalf of Taban Air crashes on landing at Mashhad International Airport, Iran, injuring at least 46 people.
- January 28 – Iran executes two opposition supporters for their role in the election protests in the country.
- February 7 – Iranian President Mahmoud Ahmadinejad orders his country's atomic agency to begin enriching uranium to a higher level.
- February 11 – President Mahmoud Ahmadinejad announces that Iran is now a nuclear state, following a successful 20% uranium enrichment.
- March 19 – Former Iranian Vice-President Hossein Marashi is jailed after being accused of spreading propaganda.
- March 31 – Shahram Amiri, a scientist involved in Iran's nuclear program, defects to the United States and begins talking to the Central Intelligence Agency.
- April 5 – Iran invites 60 countries to a two-day nuclear disarmament conference in Tehran on April 17–18, entitled "Nuclear energy for everyone, nuclear arms for no one". China says it will attend the conference which invites "the world to disarm and prevent proliferation".
- April 20 – Speaking in Tehran, Iranian Islamic cleric Hojatoleslam Kazem Sedighi blames promiscuous women for causing earthquakes.
- April 30 – Iran threatens to "cut off Israel's feet" if Israel attacks Syria.
- May 24 – Iran's largest water supply project is inaugurated in Khorramshahr.
- June 18 – The Atomic Energy Organization of Iran (AEOI) starts designing a newer and a more powerful nuclear research reactor than the current Tehran reactor, according to AEOI director Ali Akbar Salehi.
- July 9 – Iran announces that women convicted of adultery will no longer face stoning to death after international concern. They may, however, still face the death penalty.
- July 15 – July 2010 Zahedan bombings: More than 20 people are killed and 100 injured in a suicide attack at a mosque in southeastern Iran.
- July 23 – President of Iran Mahmoud Ahmadinejad announces plans to launch a crewed shuttle into space by 2019.
- July 31 – Mohammad Nouri, 80, Iranian singer, blood disorder.
- August 12 – Mohammad Ali Taraghijah, 67, Iranian painter.
- August 21 – Russian engineers start loading fuel into Iran's first nuclear reactor at Bushehr Nuclear Power Plant.
- August 27 – The 5.8 M_{w} Damghan earthquake shook northern Iran with a maximum Mercalli intensity of VII (Very strong). Four people were killed, 40 were injured, and 800 were made homeless.
- September 10 – Up to 10 people are killed and 50 are injured in an oil pipeline blast in northeastern Iran.
- September 15 – 2009–2010 detention of American hikers by Iran: Iran releases United States hiker Sarah Shourd from Evin Prison following payment of bail.
- September 22 – At least a dozen Iranians are killed and 81 are wounded in a bomb attack on a military parade in the Kurdish town of Mahabad according to reports from Iranian Arabic language television Al-Alam.
- September 28 – Iranian-Canadian blogger Hossein Derakhshan, the founder of one of the first Persian-language blogs, is sentenced to 19 years imprisonment in an Iranian court for "anti-state activity".
- October 13 – Iranian President Mahmoud Ahmadinejad visits Lebanon amidst concern from Israel and United States.
- October 26 – Iran starts loading fuel into the Bushehr Nuclear Power Plant, its first nuclear power plant.
- November 21 – Iranian President Mahmoud Ahmadinejad rejects the country's once effective family planning program as an "ungodly Western import" and urges girls to marry at age of 16.
- November 29 – Iranian nuclear scientist Majid Shahriari is killed and his wife injured, while another scientist is wounded during two attacks in Tehran. Iran says Western governments and Israel may have carried out the killing.

== Notable deaths ==
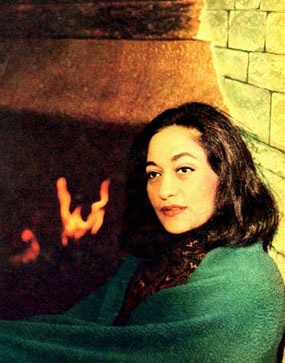
Marzieh

- January 3 – Ali Safi Golpaygani, 96, Iranian Marja', natural causes.
- January 12 – Massoud Ali-Mohammadi, 50, Iranian nuclear scientist, bomb blast.
- January 15 – Bahman Jalali, 65, Iranian photographer, pancreatic cancer.
- January 28 – Arash Rahmanipour, c.20, Iranian activist, hanging.
- January 28 – Mohammad-Reza Ali-Zamani, c.38, Iranian activist, hanging.
- March 6 – Mansour Amir-Asefi, 76, Iranian Olympic footballer, cancer.
- April 19 – Hamideh Kheirabadi, 85, Iranian actress, stroke.
- May 9 – Farzad Kamangar, 32, Iranian activist, execution by hanging.
- May 24 – Abdolhamid Rigi, c.31, Iranian militant, execution by hanging.
- June 20 – Abdolmalek Rigi, 27, Iranian Sunni Islamist militant, leader of Jundallah, execution by hanging.
- October 13 – Marzieh, 86, Iranian singer, cancer.
- November 29 – Majid Shahriari, Iranian nuclear scientist, car bomb.
- December 1 – Shahla Jahed, 39, Iranian convicted murderer, hanged.
