= 2015 in Iran =

- Decades: 1990s; 2000s; 2010s; 2020s
- See also: Other events of 2015; Years in Iran

The following lists events that happened during 2015 in the Islamic Republic of Iran.

== Incumbents ==
- President: Hassan Rouhani
- Vice President: Eshaq Jahangiri
- Supreme Leader: Ali Khamenei

== Events ==
=== February ===
- February 2 – Iran's Fajr satellite is successfully placed in the orbit.

=== May ===
- May 7 – Ethnic Kurds riot in Mahabad following the unexplained death on 4 May 2015 of Farinaz Khosravani, a 25-year-old Kurdish hotel chambermaid. Khosravani fell to her death from a fourth-floor window of the Tara, the hotel where she worked. Anger mounted following reports that Khosravani died attempting to escape an Iranian official who was threatening to rape her. The rioters reportedly set fire to the hotel. Unrest and violence spread to other Kurdish cities in Iran.

=== July ===
- July 14 – Iran agrees to long-term limits of its nuclear program in exchange for sanctions relief.

=== November ===
- November 26 - Tasnim News Agency starts publishing all content on its website under the Creative Commons Attribution 4.0 International license.

== Sports ==
- 2014–15 Iranian Futsal Super League
