= List of executions in Iran in 2016 =

This is a list of executions in Iran in 2016.

== List of executions in Iran in 2016 ==
Number	Date	Name	Conviction	Age (at Offense)	Age (at Execution)	Gender	Ethnicity	Religion	Location	Public	Source
1	2 January 2016	Mehdi Ranjkesh	Drug offenses			Male			Khorramabad Parsilon Prison	No	
2	4 January 2016	Abbas Bazari Jamkhaneh	Murder			Male			Surak	Yes	
3	4 January 2016		Murder		50	Male			Nowshahr	No	
4	5 January 2016	Mehdi Nasirtian				Male			Tabriz Central Prison	No	
5	5 January 2016	Farhang Horouyan	Drug offenses			Male			Orumiyeh Central Prison	No	
6	5 January 2016	Haji Divaribadri	Drug offenses			Male			Orumiyeh Central Prison	No	
7	5 January 2016	Hamid Ghanbari	Drug offenses			Male			Orumiyeh Central Prison	No	
8	6 January 2016	Tofigh Mohammadfar				Male			Tabriz Central Prison	No	
9	6 January 2016	Hossein Zadegan Eskandar				Male			Tabriz Central Prison	No	
10	6 January 2016	Amir Ali Zadegan Eskandar				Male			Tabriz Central Prison	No	
11	6 January 2016	Zahra Nemati				Female			Tabriz Central Prison	No	
12	6 January 2016	Mohammad Jamali Fashi	Drug offenses			Male			Hamedan Central Prison	No	
13	6 January 2016		Drug offenses			Male			Nazarabad	No	
14	6 January 2016		Drug offenses			Male			Nazarabad	No	
15	6 January 2016		Drug offenses			Male			Nazarabad	No	
16	6 January 2016	Maghsoud Mehdizadeh	Murder			Male			Gohardasht Prison	No	
17	6 January 2016	Hamid Khodabandebou	Murder			Male			Gohardasht Prison	No	
18	6 January 2016	Mehdi Sadeghi	Murder			Male			Gohardasht Prison	No	
19	6 January 2016	Mohammad Nadirnejad	Murder			Male			Gohardasht Prison	No	
20	6 January 2016		Murder			Male			Gohardasht Prison	No	
21	7 January 2016		Drug offenses			Male			Ardabil Central Prison	No	
22	7 January 2016		Drug offenses			Male			Ardabil Central Prison	No	
23	7 January 2016		Drug offenses			Male			Ardabil Central Prison	No	
24	7 January 2016	V. R.	Murder			Male			Khoy	Yes	
25	7 January 2016	Reza Jalili Alishahi	Murder			Male			Shabestar	Yes	
26	9 January 2016	V. A.	Drug offenses		34	Male			Rasht Central Prison	No	
27	9 January 2016	A. T.	Drug offenses		33	Male			Rasht Central Prison	No	
28	10 January 2016	B. G.	Drug offenses			Male			Larestan Prison	No	
29	10 January 2016	M. H.	Drug offenses			Male			Larestan Prison	No	
30	10 January 2016	A. B.	Drug offenses			Male			Larestan Prison	No	
31	10 January 2016	Ghodrat Garavand	Murder			Male			Khorramabad Prison	No	
32	10 January 2016		Drug offenses			Male			Sari Central Prison	No	
33	10 January 2016		Drug offenses			Male			Sari Central Prison	No	
34	10 January 2016		Drug offenses			Male			Sari Central Prison	No	
35	12 January 2016	H. S.	Moharebeh			Male			Zanjan Central Prison	No	
36	12 January 2016	Seyed Hamid Hajian	Drug offenses			Male			Karaj Central Prison	No	
37	12 January 2016	Hossein Toutiannoush	Drug offenses			Male			Karaj Central Prison	No	
38	12 January 2016	Mostafa Jamshidi	Drug offenses			Male			Karaj Central Prison	No	
39	12 January 2016	Mohsen Nasiri	Drug offenses			Male			Karaj Central Prison	No	
40	13 January 2016	Aref Shahindeji	Murder			Male			Orumiyeh Central Prison	No	
41	13 January 2016	Hossein Ezzataleb	Murder			Male			Orumiyeh Central Prison	No	
42	13 January 2016	Rahman Ranjbar	Murder			Male			Orumiyeh Central Prison	No	
43	13 January 2016	Alireza Akbari	Murder			Male			Orumiyeh Central Prison	No	
44	13 January 2016	Arsalan Badyaneh	Murder			Male			Orumiyeh Central Prison	No	
45	13 January 2016	Abdul Wahab Hatami	Murder			Male			Orumiyeh Central Prison	No	
46	13 January 2016	Houshang Zare	Murder	< 18		Male			Adel Abad Prison, Shiraz	No	
47	14 January 2016	A. B.				Male		Wahhabi	Yazd Central Prison	No	
48	16 January 2016	S. Gh.	Drug offenses		50	Male			Rasht Central Prison	No	
49	16 January 2016	M. F.	Drug offenses		35	Male			Rasht Central Prison	No	
50	16 January 2016	A. A.	Drug offenses		24	Male			Rasht Central Prison	No	
51	16 January 2016	H. R.	Rape		27	Male			Rasht Central Prison	No	
28 ?	18 July 2016	Hassan Afshar	Rape, sodomy	17	19	Male		Sunni Islam	Arak Prison	No	
