= Shahrokh Zamani =

Iranian labor activist

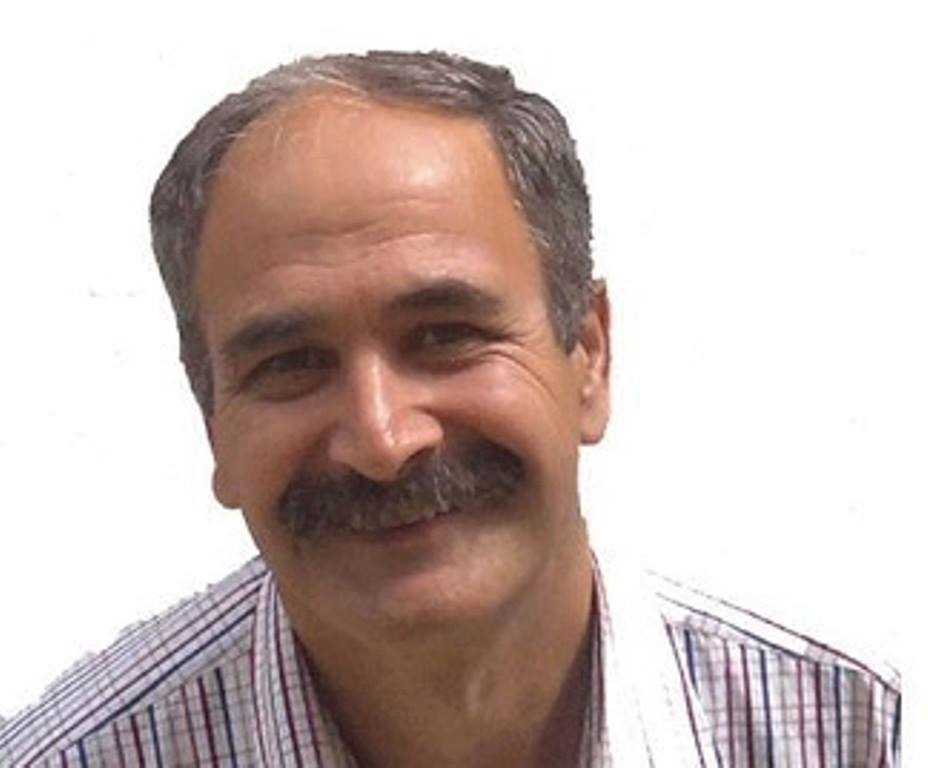
- Born: 1963; Tabriz, East Azerbaijan, Iran
- Died: September 13, 2015 (aged 51–52); Gohardasht Prison, Gohardasht, Iran

Shahrokh Zamani (1963 - September 13, 2015) was an Iranian union activist. He was arrested several times because of his activism in defending workers’ rights, especially the right to provide social insurance and unemployment insurance for dyers.

== Life ==
Shahrokh Zamani was born in Tabriz, the capital of Iran's East Azerbaijan province, in 1963.

Zamani was a member of the Board of Directors and the Board Committee for the Establishment of Independent Trade Unions to Reopen the Union of Construction Workers and Painters. He was held in political prisoners’ ward in Rajai Shahr prison.

Zamani was arrested in 1993, on charges of illegal activities in the painters’ union and was imprisoned for about 18 months.

He was a member of the provisional board for reopening of House-Painter Workers’ Union and the Follow-up Committee to Set-up Free Labor Organizations and was a communist and revolutionary labour right activist from the people of Azerbaijan.

He was arrested again in the city of Tabriz, on June 8, 2011, on charges of “inciting against the regime. He was sentenced to 11 years in jail, but was released on bail. He was arrested again in January 2012 and sent to Tabriz Prison to serve his sentence. According to a cellmate, while in prison Zamani took morning runs in the prison courtyard and read books in the evenings.

In 2014, Zamani wrote a letter to U.N. Special Rapporteur Ahmed Shaheed complaining about his mistreatment in prison. He wrote, “the Supreme Court clerk who reviewed my case said [there was] not a single legal argument that a judge could have relied on in my file to [support] a conviction. My wife was told there’s no point in trying to get justice for my case at the Islamic Human Rights office, and that the decision-makers are elsewhere”.

In March and April 2014 Zamani undertook a hunger strike "in solidarity with Gonabadi Dervishes".

He died from a stroke on September 13, 2015, in Gohardasht Prison, after being denied medical treatment.

== See also ==
- Human rights in Iran
