= 2011 executions in Iran =

The United Nations, Amnesty International, Iranian opposition leaders and others criticized the Islamic Republic of Iran for its high rate of executions in 2011. According to Ahmed Shaheed, the UN Special Rapporteur for Human Rights in Iran, Iran executed a total of 670 people in 2011.

== Overview ==
By January 16, 2011, the Iranian government had reportedly executed 47 people since the New Year; an average of about three people a day. The International Campaign for Human Rights in Iran decried the hangings as "an execution binge orchestrated by the intelligence and security agencies."

By the end of the month, the United Nations reported that Iran had executed at least 66 people, including three known to be political dissidents. According to the UN, executions were running at triple the rate of the previous year when about 18 to 25 people were executed a month. The UN estimated about 300 executions occurred in Iran in 2010. Navi Pillay, the High Commissioner for Human Rights, stated, "We have urged Iran, time and time again, to halt executions... I am very dismayed that instead of heeding our calls, the Iranian authorities appear to have stepped up the use of the death penalty... I call upon Iran to establish a moratorium on executions with a view to abolishing the death penalty." Iran's foreign ministry spokesman Ramin Mehmanparast blasted the West for condemning Iran's executions. He said that 80 percent of those hanged were drug smugglers and stated, "If Iran does not combat drugs, Europe and the West will be hurt."

Iranian opposition leaders Mir-Hossein Mousavi and Mehdi Karrubi, as well as commentators asserted that the Iranian regime has stepped up executions in a bid to intimidate and silence the Iranian opposition from taking to the streets like in the 2009–2010 Iranian election protests.

In May 2011, Mohammad Javad Larijani, head of Iran's High Council for Human Rights, threatened to allow the transit of illegal drugs through Iranian territory to Europe if the West continued to criticize the Iranian government for its practice of executing drug traffickers. Larajani stated that ceasing the practice would reduce the overall number of executions in Iran by 74 percent "but the way will be paved for the smuggling of narcotics to Europe."

In July 2011, Amnesty International stated that Iran was on course for a record year in executions. In the first six months of 2011, according to Amnesty, Iran had executed 320 people, an average of almost two executions a day. Other human rights groups placed the execution count even higher.

In December 2011, Amnesty International reported that 600 people had been executed in Iran through the end of November, with 488 of the executions carried out for alleged drug offenses. Amnesty warned of a "new wave of drug offense executions" based on its figures that showed a threefold increase in drug-related executions from 2009. The report said that Afghan nationals were particularly at risk for drug offense, with as many as 4,000 Afghans on death row in Iran.

In his first report to the UN Human Rights Council on Iran in March 2012, Ahmed Shaheed, the newly appointed UN Special Rapporteur for Human Rights in Iran, stated that Iran had executed a total of 670 people in 2011.

== Public executions ==
On April 27, 2011, Amnesty International condemned the sharp raise in the rate of public executions in Iran during 2011. By that date, Amnesty reported as many as 13 had been hanged in public, compared to 14 in all of 2010. The figure also included the first executions of juvenile offenders in the world for the 2011 calendar year. An Amnesty official stated, "It is deeply disturbing that despite a moratorium on public executions ordered in 2008, the Iranian authorities are once again seeking to intimidate people by such spectacles which not only dehumanize the victim, but brutalize those who witness it."

Earlier, on April 21, 2011, the Norwegian Foreign Minister Jonas Gahr Støre also condemned Iran's increase in public executions. He stated, "The increased number of public executions using brutal methods such as suffocation by being hoisted up by a crane are particularly grotesque and not worthy of a modern society." Norwegian research had shown 15 public executions in 2011, as compared to 19 in 2010.

=== Cranes Campaign ===
In response to the Iranian regime's spate of public executions, in March 2011 United Against Nuclear Iran (UANI) launched its "Cranes Campaign," with the goal of pressuring crane manufacturers worldwide to end their business in Iran in order to prevent the use of their equipment for such violent ends. Through its campaign, UANI has succeeded in pressuring Terex (U.S.), Tadano (Japan), Liebherr, UNIC (Japan), and Konecranes (Finland) to end their business in Iran. Tadano and UNIC, both of Japan, ended their Iran sales after UANI presented graphic photographic evidence of their cranes being used in public executions in the country.

== Secret executions ==
An interim report on human rights in Iran released in October 2011 by Ahmed Shaheed, the UN special rapporteur on the human rights situation in Iran, revealed that secret executions had been taking place in Vakilabad Prison in Mashhad in eastern Iran. According to Shaheed, Iranian authorities conducted 300 secret executions in Vakilabad in 2010 and another 146 executions as of the report's publication in 2011.

== Notable executions ==
- January 24, 2011: Iran executed political prisoners Jafar Kazemi and Mohammad Ali Hajaghaei for allegedly taking photos and footage of the Iranian election protests as well as chanting slogans promoting the People's Mujahideen of Iran (PMOI), a banned opposition group.
- January 29, 2011: Iran executed dual Dutch-Iranian citizen Zahra Bahrami on drug trafficking charges which were disputed by her family. Iranian authorities initially arrested her for her participation in the December 2009 Ashura protests. Bahrami had previous criminal record in the Netherlands for drug trafficking. In protest of her execution, the Dutch foreign ministry decided to freeze all contacts with Iran, and later recalled the ambassador.

== See also ==
- 2011 in Iran
- 2011 Iranian protests
- Political repression in the Islamic Republic of Iran
