= Gholamreza Khosravi Savadjani =

Iranian political prisoner

- Born: 15 July 1965
- Died: 1 June 2014 (aged 48); Raja'i Shahr Prison, Iran
- Cause of death: Execution by hanging

Gholamreza Khosravi Savadjani (15 July 1965 – 1 June 2014) was a political prisoner in Iran who was executed on 1 June 2014. His execution was highly controversial due to accusations that Khosravi did not receive due process or fair treatment during his trial or leading up to his death.

== Background ==
Khosravi hailed from Abadan, a city in southwest Iran. He was a known sympathizer of the People's Mujahedin of Iran (known frequently and interchangeably by the abbreviations MEK, PMOI, or MKO), which is a comparatively progressive political-militant organization focused on interpreting Islam in a way that politically promotes tolerance, democracy, and social and gendered equality, countering the more conservative government in power in Iran. According to the Human Rights Watch, Iranian officials consider MEK to be a terrorist organization.

Khosravi was targeted repeatedly for his involvement with the organization, with his legal troubles beginning with the start of his involvement with the group in the 1980s. At one point in 1981, when he was 16 years old, he was arrested for his involvement with MEK and sentenced to ten years in prison; he was released in 1986 after serving five, during which he endured 40 months of solitary confinement in various detention centers, including Kerman's Ministry of Intelligence and the notorious Evin Prison.

== Arrest and sentencing ==
In February 2008, while staying in the Kerman Province of Rafsanjan, Khosravi was arrested once again for his involvement with MEK. After his 2008 arrest, authorities claimed that they discovered documents suggesting that Khosravi was working with MEK's satellite television channel, Simaye Azadi (translated to "Voice of Freedom"). Human rights organization Iran Human Rights accused Iranian officials of subjecting Khosravi to physical and psychological torture to extract information from him, some of which may have been coerced and unreliable. They also accused Iranian officials of pressuring Khosravi to give televised confessions and to name associates, both of which he apparently refused to do. Later that year, Khosravi was sentenced to six years' imprisonment, three of which were suspended. However, the Iranian Ministry of Intelligence appealed the sentence in hopes of increasing its severity. The appeal led to the three suspended years being implemented, bringing the total time that Khosravi would spend in prison to six years.

Following the extension of Khosravi's sentence, the Ministry of Intelligence appealed the sentence again, which led to two retrials being ordered for Khosravi. During the second retrial, authorities used the proof of Khosravi's monetary support to Simaye Azadi to enable charging him with moharebeh, translated to "crimes against God" or "enmity against God." In Iran, charges of moharebeh may be brought against people who take up arms against the state or belong to organizations that are perceived as taking up arms against the government – thereby, people who participate in treason – as those people are seen as acting against God in doing so. Because Iranian authorities branded MEK a terrorist organization, and because Khosravi had donated money to the organization, a lower court convicted Khosravi of moharebeh and sentenced him to death in 2010.

== Controversy and first execution date ==
The death sentence caused an international outcry from groups such as Amnesty International, Human Rights Watch, The Center for Human Rights in Iran, National Council of Resistance of Iran, and others that condemned the Iranian government for depriving Khosravi of due process in convicting him. Namely, the organizations criticized Iran for subjecting Khosravi to double jeopardy, pointing out that Iran ratified the International Covenant on Civil and Political Rights which declared in Article 14, section 7, that "no one shall be liable to be tried or punished again for an offence for which he has already been finally convicted." Section 6 of the same covenant states that the death penalty "may be imposed only for the most serious of crimes," and Human Rights Watch accused Iran of violating the covenant by executing Khosravi for the mere offense of "providing information and money to a Mojahedin-e Khalq-affiliated television station," which would not meet the threshold specified in Section 6. Lastly, Human Rights Watch pointed out that the United Nations Human Rights Committee, the committee in charge of monitoring signatories' compliance with the covenant, required "scrupulous respect of the guarantees of fair trial" and that failure to abide by "the provisions of article 14 […] constitutes a violation of the right to life." A few of the organizations also called for Iran to begin a moratorium on the death penalty, calling it "much-abused," with Human Rights Watch specifying that Iran should get rid of "vague anti-terrorism laws that criminalize peaceful dissent" as well.

Following an appeal by Khosravi's lawyer challenging the legality of the death sentence, the Supreme Court of Iran affirmed Khosravi's death sentence on 21 April 2012. Following the affirmation of the sentence, it became clear that there were no longer any legal hurdles to executing Khosravi. The Human Rights Watch declared in a release demanding a stop to the execution that Iranian officials could schedule a date of execution as early as 10 September 2012.

As Khosravi's 2012 execution date approached, one of his family members, speaking to Human Rights Watch, revealed that Khosravi endured 40 days of solitary confinement during his interrogation in February 2008, as well as during the investigation that unearthed Khosravi's ties and support to Simaye Azadi. Moreover, neither Khosravi's family nor his lawyers had been formally notified of authorities' plans to execute Khosravi on 10 September; discussions of the imminent execution date arose from the fact that Khosravi was transferred to Ward 350 of Evin Prison, suggesting that authorities planned to execute him there imminently. Iranian law requires the family and lawyers of a condemned person to be informed of an execution date. Shortly before 10 September 2012, the execution was postponed indefinitely.

In May 2013, Iran revised its Islamic Penal Code to specify that charges of moharebeh could only be brought against people who had literally, not figuratively, taken up arms. In spite of the fact that this change to the penal code excluded Khosravi from the death penalty, Iranian officials did not act to change Khosravi's sentence. As a result of the Iranian government's failure to change Khosravi's sentence, the President of the International Federation for Human Rights, Karim Lahidji, stated, "It may only be concluded that Mr. Khosravi Savadjani faced an extremely unfair trial influenced by the intelligence and security services."

== Imprisonment and execution ==
Sometime close to when his first date of execution was postponed, Iranian officials ordered Khosravi's defense attorney, Abdolfattah Soltani, to be imprisoned for 18 years on charges unrelated to Khosravi's case. According to Soltani's daughter, the charges were for "co-founding the Center for Human Rights Defenders, spreading anti-government propaganda, endangering national security and accepting an illegal prize [the Nuremberg International Human Rights Award]". Amnesty International designated him a prisoner of conscience, "held solely for the peaceful exercise of his right to freedom of expression and association, including his work as a defence lawyer and in the Centre". Soltani was sent to Evin Prison's Ward 350, where he shared a cell with his former client.

Approximately two months prior to Khosravi's execution, on 17 April 2014, Evin Prison guards raided Ward 350 and beat many of the inmates imprisoned there. Khosravi suffered severe head and face wounds, including having his right ear torn. According to the National Council of Resistance of Iran, the guards were acting on orders from the Iranian Ministry of Intelligence to single out and assault Ward 350's political prisoners. Subsequent to the assault, Khosravi was transferred to a solitary confinement cell for nearly two weeks. He was refused any medical treatment despite the severity of his wounds. Even in that condition, Khosravi staged a hunger strike with other prisoners who had also been forced into solitary confinement, protesting to be moved out of solitary confinement and back to Ward 350. After 23 days and a worldwide campaign, guards obliged, and the hunger strike ended. However, one informed Khosravi that he was to be executed imminently. Iran Human Rights posited that Khosravi's execution, which was indeed scheduled soon after the hunger strike, may have been in retaliation against the political prisoners' resistance and protest of the 17 April assault.

Khosravi was transferred to the Quarantine Section of Raja'i Shahr Prison of Karaj on 28 May 2014. Three days later on 31 May, the day before his execution, he was placed in solitary confinement for one last time as preparations for his execution were underway. Soon after his move to the prison, his family members were notified that they could visit him. Only after the visit were they notified that it would be their last visit with him and that his execution was scheduled for dawn the next morning.

The unusual and sudden timing for the family visit, combined with Khosravi's transfer to Raja'i Shahr Prison, alerted human rights organizations to the impending execution. On 31 May, Amnesty International released a statement and a last-minute plea calling Khosravi's impending execution "a violation of international and national laws." They demanded that the Iranian regime halt his execution immediately while the Deputy of Amnesty's Middle East and North Africa sector, Hasibeh Haj-Saraei, released a separate statement announcing that "the Iranian authorities are about to execute a man who has been denied a fair trial."

Nevertheless, on 1 June 2014, Khosravi was executed by hanging in Raja'i Shahr Prison. He was buried in Esfahan in central Iran as officials from the Ministry of Intelligence watched. Only one of his family members was permitted to attend the burial.
