= Gohardasht =

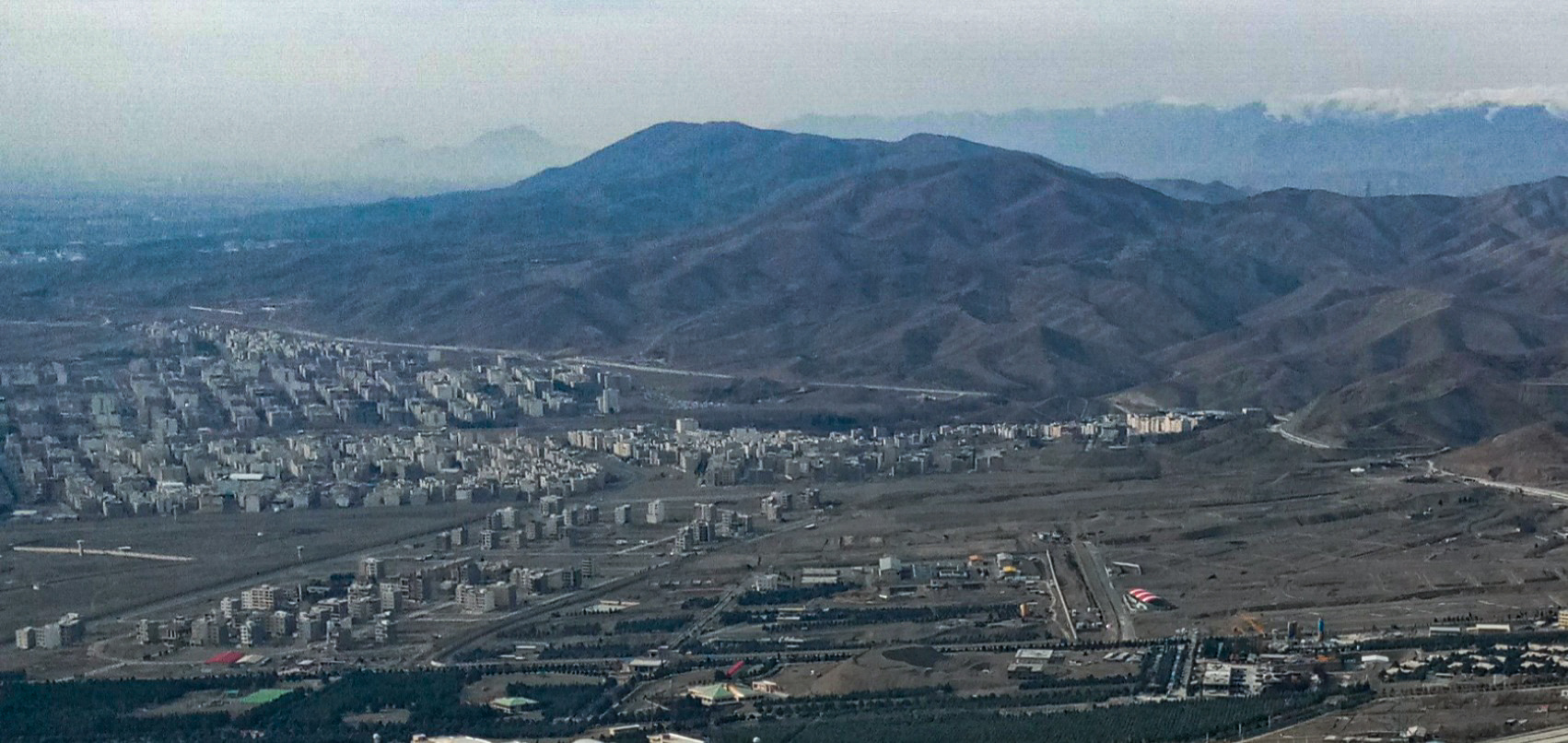

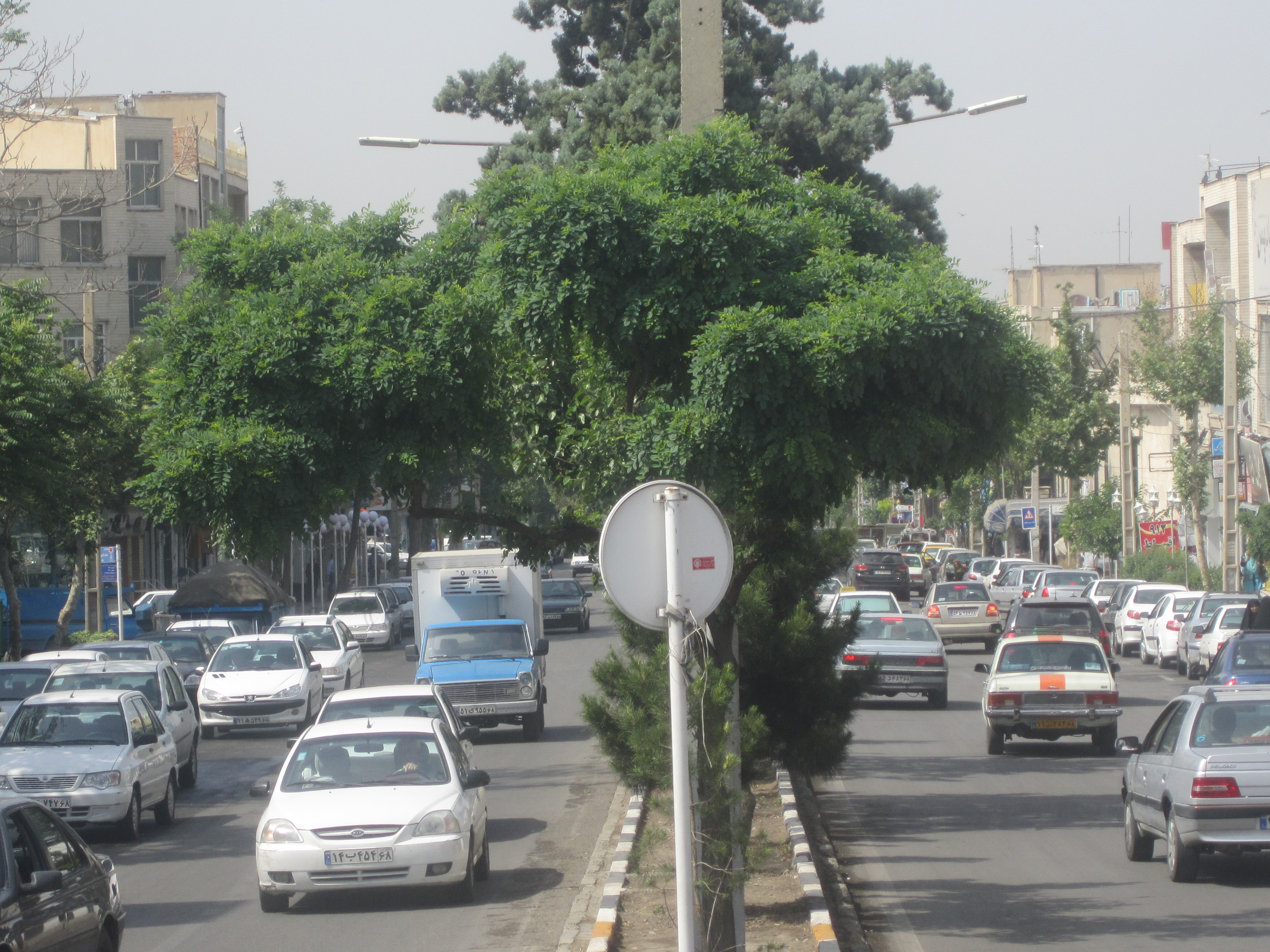
A view of Rastakhiz street in Gohardasht

Gohardasht (Persian: گوهردشت), is a neighborhood of Karaj, in Alborz province of Iran, located on the north side of Karaj.

It is known for the Gohardasht Prison.
