= Safdar Rahmat Abadi =

Iranian politician (died 2013)

- Died: 10 November 2013; Tehran, Iran
- Occupation: Politician

Safdar Rahmat Abadi (also Rahmatabadi) (died 10 November 2013) was an Iranian politician who served as deputy minister of industry in the governments of Mahmoud Ahmadinejad and Hassan Rouhani. His remit also included mining and trade.

He was shot dead either in his car or as he entered his car at around 7:50 pm (15:50 GMT) on 10 November 2013 in the capital Tehran. His attacker has not been identified. No organisation has yet claimed responsibility, and the motivation for the killing is unknown. According to the BBC, some Iranian bloggers have been critical of the official position that the killing was not a political assassination.

The assassination is the first of a senior political figure at the national level in Iran in several years. It follows the murder by shooting of Mousa Nouri, public prosecutor for the city of Zabol, in the border province of Sistan and Baluchestan on 6 November, for which the Sunni Islamist group Jaish ul-Adl claimed responsibility.
