= Zahra Bahrami =

Executed dual Dutch-Iranian citizen

- Born: 25 January 1965; Tehran, Iran
- Died: 29 January 2011 (aged 46); Evin Prison, Tehran, Iran
- Cause of death: Execution by hanging
- Known for: Political Prisoner

Zahra Bahrami, also spelled Sahra Baahrami (Persian: زهرا بهرامی; 25 January 1965 – 29 January 2011) (Previous name: Zahra Mehrabi), was a dual Dutch and Iranian citizen who was executed in Iran after being arrested during a political protest, and later convicted by the Islamic Revolutionary Court for drug trafficking. She was initially arrested in December 2009 for participating in the Ashura protests and charged with national security offenses as well as for being a member of Kingdom Assembly of Iran. However, according to the Iranian Judicatory, a subsequent search of her house uncovered 450 grams of cocaine, 420 grams of opium, and several forged passports. Subsequently, the Tehran prosecutors charged her with drug trafficking and being a member of an international drug-trafficking network, for which she received a death sentence.

In protest at her execution, the Dutch Ministry of Foreign affairs temporarily froze diplomatic contacts with Iran, but resumed on 18 February 2011.

== Early life ==
Bahrami was born in Tehran, Iran. She later moved to the Netherlands and became a Dutch citizen by naturalisation. However, she also retained her Iranian citizenship. In one passport, she spelled her name Zahra Bahrami, while spelling it Sahra Baahrami in the other. She worked as a professional belly dancer and maintained a second residence in London.

According to a TV show aired on Dutch broadcasting network NOS, Bahrami was found guilty of smuggling nearly 16 kilos of cocaine from the Caribbean in her luggage in 2003.

She was sentenced to three years in jail with one being suspended, according to the current affairs show Nieuwsuur.

== Arrest ==
In 2009, Bahrami traveled from the Netherlands to Iran, claiming that the purpose of her visit was to see one of her children. While participating in the Ashura protests of the 2009 Iranian elections on 27 December 2009, she was arrested, and held in Tehran's Evin Prison. Iranian prosecutors initially said she belonged to the militant monarchist group Kingdom Assembly of Iran, and charged her with setting up an anti-regime organization and spreading anti-regime propaganda. However, she was not charged on these accounts, and most other protesters were released in the following days. Due to the two variant spellings of her name, the MFA was initially unable to confirm whether or not she was a Dutch citizen, and were able to confirm this by July 2010. Due to Iran not recognizing dual citizenship, Iran did not allow the Dutch consulate to provide legal assistance to her.

Tehran prosecutors charged her with the capital crime of drug trafficking. Prosecutors stated that anti-drug police had uncovered 450 grams (16 oz) of cocaine and 420 grams (15 oz) of opium during a raid on her home.

During a media interview, her daughter claimed that the charges were fabricated because Bahrami "did not even smoke cigarettes."

Prominent human rights lawyer Nasrin Sotoudeh acted as Bahrami's defense attorney. However, on 28 August 2010, Sotoudeh's office was raided; it was unclear whether the raid had anything to do with Bahrami's case, or with Sotoudeh's other human rights activities. Sotoudeh herself was arrested days later, and also imprisoned at Evin. In January 2011, Soutodeh was sentenced to 6 years in prison for "acting against national security" and banned from working as a lawyer and leaving the country for 10 years.

== Execution ==
After her appeal to Iran's Supreme Court was turned down, Iran executed Bahrami by hanging on 29 January 2011 (at 5am) in the execution chamber at Evin Prison. She became the 66th person to receive capital punishment in Iran in 2011. Her lawyer said she was shocked that the death sentence on the drugs charges had been carried out before an investigation on the security charges against her was even completed.

In protest of her execution, the Dutch government froze contact with the Iranian government. The Dutch foreign minister Uri Rosenthal said he was "shocked, shattered by this act by a barbaric regime." Bahrami's lawyers were not contacted by officials from the Dutch embassy in Tehran until two weeks before the verdict since the Netherlands only provides financial and legal support in cases of this kind if the death sentence has formally been pronounced and the defendant has appealed against the sentence. The International Campaign for Human Rights in Iran also protested her execution, quoting an unnamed "informed source" as saying that her interrogation was conducted by the "Iranian Intelligence Ministry’s Anti-Espionage Team" rather than narcotics trafficking officials, rendering nil the "possibility that her initial charges were drug-related." Dutch-Iranian diplomatic ties resumed on 18 February 2011.

== See also ==
- 2011 executions in Iran
- List of foreign nationals detained in Iran
- List of Iranian women prisoners and detainees
