= Hila Sedighi =

هیلا صدیقی Hila Sedighi
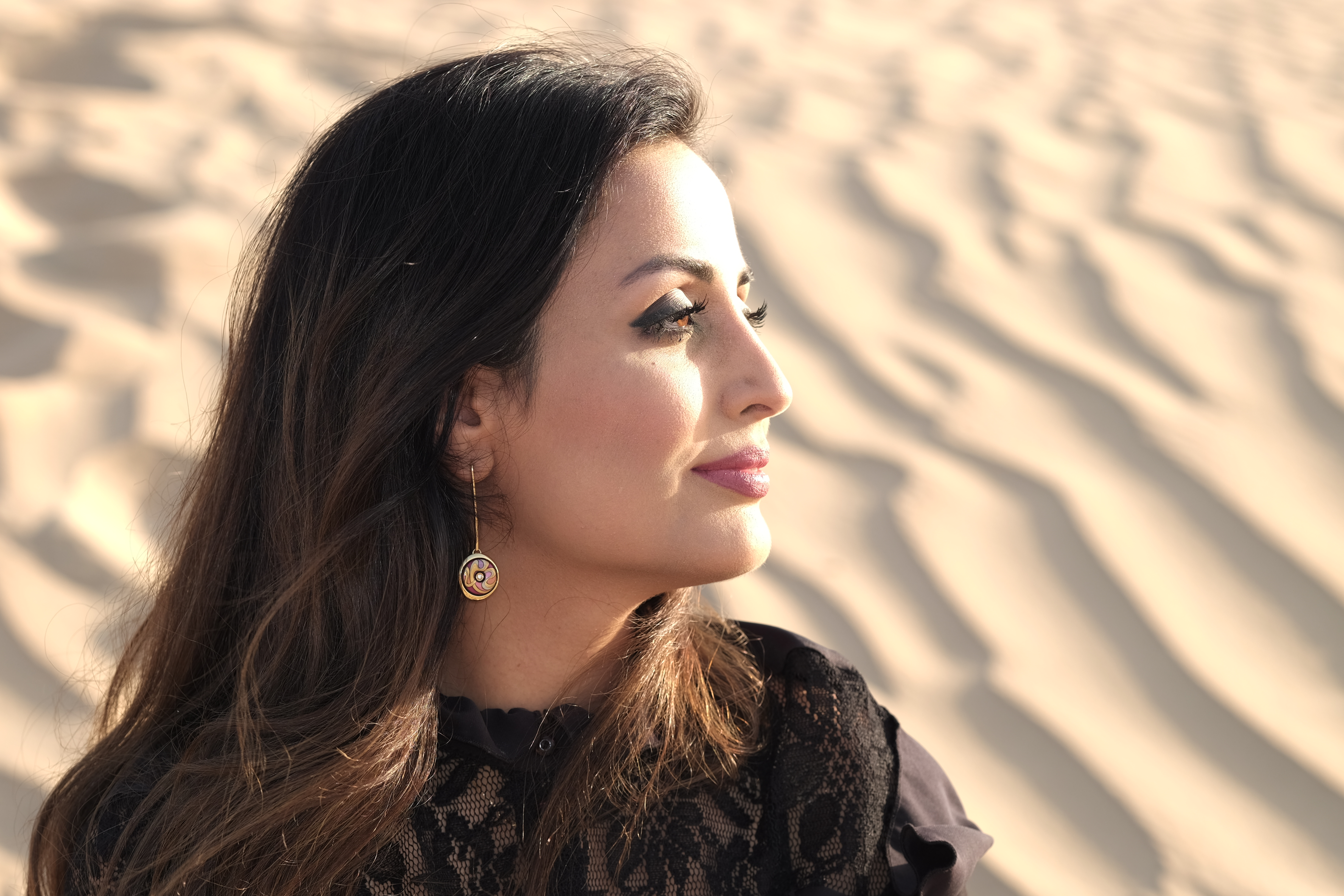
- Hila Sedighi
- Born: March 29, 1985 (age 41)
- Occupations: painter, social activist, poet
- Awards: Hellman-Hammett grant in 2012
- Website: www.HilaSedighi.Com

Hila Sedighi is a poet, painter and social activist in Iran.

== Life ==
Hila Sedighi was born in the year 1985 (1364) in Tehran. She spends her first year in Tehran, before moving to Istanbul, the city her father spent his teenage years in. Sedighi and her family remain in Istanbul until end of 1990. Back to Iran, she starts her primary education. In 1999, in 10th grade, she is chosen by the Supreme Council of the Ministry of Education as one of the two students in the country to receive a complimentary membership (that would last for the duration of her school life). That year, she also receives a membership from the Central foundation committee of ‘Hamseda’ youth club, and starts contributing to the 6th sector of Tehran, both socially and culturally. In addition, she becomes chief editor of the Shahre Bacheha (City of children) magazine, distributed in schools in Tehran's 6th sector.

In summer 2002, she establishes the Neyestan cultural literary association, becoming the youngest secretary of the national cultural literary association. Meetings of this organisation are held every quarter at the start, but progressively meetings are held monthly, up until spring 2009. Several contemporary poets and professors attend these events, and a wide range of musical groups perform. She contributes to the preparation of Dr. Shareaty's father's house museum.

In 2003, she has joined a university to study law.

In 2006, Hila Sedighi joins the Baran campaign, and mostly supports reformist candidates in the city council, parliament, and presidential elections. The Baran Foundation will continue its work until 2009.

In 2007, she helps a couple of her friends establish the Kimiadaran Javan club, with the goal of preserving and reviving Iran's cultural heritage, and serves as its chief executive. She becomes responsible for the legal department of the cultural social department of Tehran's municipality, but resigns, further to the 2009 presidential elections.

Hila Sedighi holds a bachelor's degree in law.

In 2016, Hila Sedighi was arrested after her freedom speech in Iran.

=== Marriage ===
Hila Sedighi had a trip to India and Dubai in 2012 regarding the removal of her ban on leaving the country. In this trip, Hila met up with an old friend after more than 3 years, and decided to start a life with him. After her marriage, Hila and her husband are on a move between Tehran and Dubai.

== Poetry ==
A recent development in contemporary Iranian literature has been the rise of poetry reading evenings, and video footage of public readings by Hila Sedighi is readily available on social networks.

Hila Sedighi has written “Autumn’s Rain” for oppressed students of Iran (Story of my missing classmate).
Her poem "It's Green Again" was read for the 27th anniversary of Meena’s assassination.

Hasan Yousefi Ashkoury, in a note titled “There are a couple of streets from here to spring”, analysed some of Hila Sedighi's poems. In a part of this note it is mentioned that “Hila in these 2 poems, especially the first one has showed that she has the talent and to some extent has knowledge of ancient poetry techniques. Most importantly, and happily, she is full of the natural “women” sense and feeling. The future of this young poet is promising, hope that she finds success. In the poem Gole Maryam (Maryam Flower) there are poetic and accurate references to the country's current status, as well as the political and cultural limitations forcing Iranians to migrate to other countries and remain there. whether we agree or disagree to these points (I myself agree with most), now it is not the time for me to discuss, since the purpose of this note is completely different. That “Different” is with all of the limitations and the bad situation of the country at the moment, the poet believes in a bright future and writes: Maryam flower even if the clouds are black / there are just a few streets from here to spring. In reality she doesn't accept any reason to leave the country by choice, or even by force. Poets have a more open mind than others, and so the poet write although our homelands sky is filled with darkness and depression, a spring of fresh air and brightness is right around the corner.”

Masoud Behnoud also wrote an emotional note after Hila received her sentence. In this note, it is said that: “The poet must be wiped. The poet must be tied down. Otherwise, God forbid, the multi-million dollar thefts have to be tied with ropes. God forbid, those liars who got out people into this situation had to be tied, may this day never come. the judge should have said for every line of poem, the poet has to be wiped every morning. A hit each day, So that the judge could have joined the group of judges in history who sent Masoud saad to prison. And those who tied down Farkhy Yazdi’s mouth, and killed him. So he is worth joining the ones who sent snipers to Mirzade eshghi, and Bahar, malekolshoara (king of poets)”

== Star season painting exhibition ==
After a few months later and in February 2012, Hila Sedighi organised an exhibition of her artwork on large format canvases. The exhibition saw massive interest from people from all over the country, and famous artist and political faces. Hila sedighi painted her real and surreal paintings with the help of pastel and spray paint.

== Human Rights Watch Award ==
In 2012, Hila Sedighi is awarded by Human Rights Watch the Hellman-Hammett Grant, for Iran.

== Recognition ==
In 2013 in Issaquah, Washington, USA, painter Farshad Alamdari held an exhibition titled “Women of Persia”. One of the paintings is a portrait of Hila Sedighi as an example of an influential face of modern Iran.
