= Taban Air Flight 6437 =

2010 aviation accident

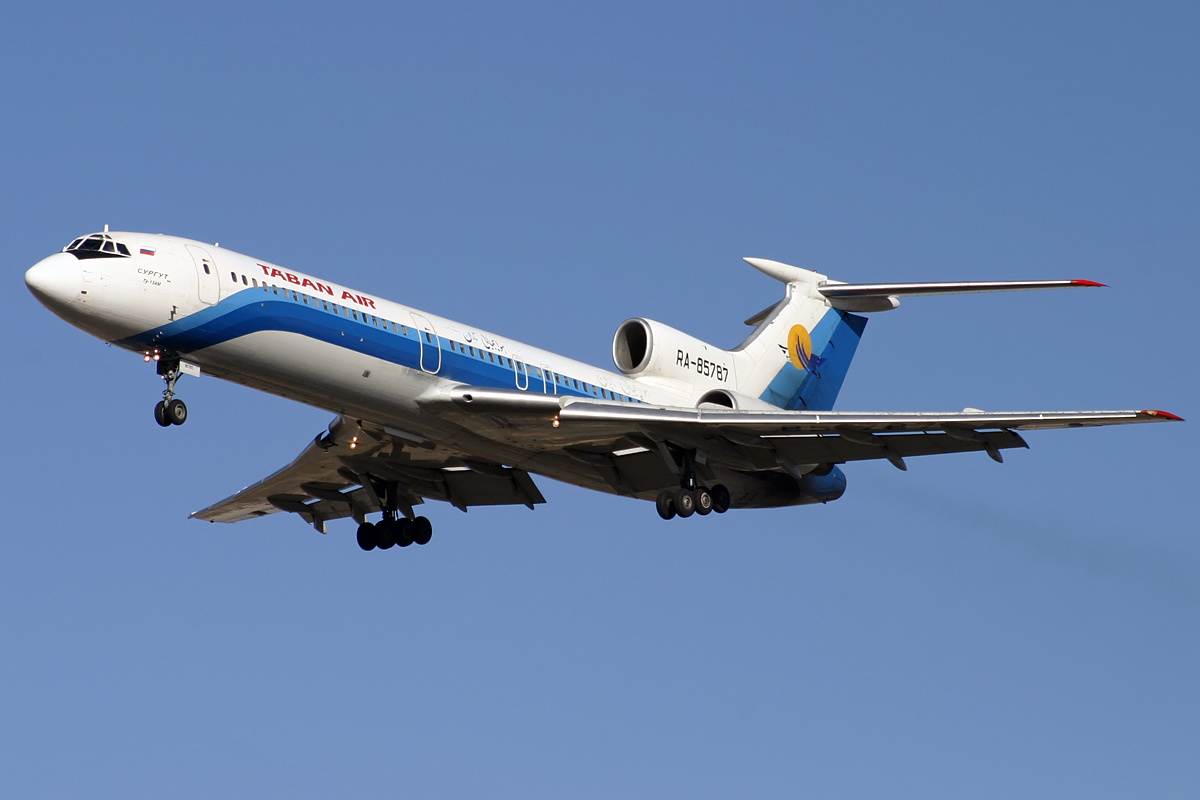
- RA-85787, the aircraft involved in the accident, seen in 2009

Accident
- Date: 24 January 2010
- Summary: Runway excursion due to pilot error.
- Site: Mashhad International Airport, Mashhad, Iran; 36°14′06″N 59°38′27″E

Aircraft
- Aircraft type: Tupolev Tu-154M
- Aircraft name: Surgut (Сургу́т)
- Operator: Taban Air
- IATA flight No.: HH6437
- ICAO flight No.: TBN6437
- Call sign: TABAN AIR 6437
- Registration: RA-85787
- Flight origin: Abadan-Ayatollah Jami International Airport, Iran
- Stopover: Isfahan International Airport, Iran
- Destination: Mashhad International Airport, Mashhad, Iran
- Occupants: 170
- Passengers: 157
- Crew: 13
- Fatalities: 0
- Injuries: 47
- Survivors: 170 (all)

Taban Air Flight 6437 was a scheduled domestic flight operated by a Tupolev Tu-154 that crashed on landing at Mashhad, Iran on 24 January 2010. All 170 people escaped from the burning aircraft without loss of life. Most of the passengers were pilgrims returning from visiting holy sites in Iraq.

== Aircraft ==
The aircraft involved was a Tupolev Tu-154M. It was registered RA-85787. The aircraft first flew in 1993.

== Accident ==
Flight 6437 was being operated by Kolavia on behalf of Taban Air. It had originated at Abadan and had diverted to Isfahan due to poor visibility at Mashhad. Once visibility improved, the aircraft took off again, but the visibility deteriorated before Flight 6437 could land. The flight was holding near Mashhad International Airport when a passenger fell seriously ill. The crew were told and they declared a medical emergency. They decided to land at Mashhad on an ILS approach for runway 31R despite the low visibility. During the landing the tail struck the ground causing the aircraft to veer off the runway, the nose gear to collapse, the right wing to strike the ground, and a fire. All passengers and crew survived the accident with 47 receiving injuries. The METAR in force at the time of the accident was OIMM 240350Z 00000KT 0200 FG VV002 02/02 Q1021 A3017. (Note: Translation of METAR: METAR for Mashhad International Airport, issued on the 24th of the month at 03:50 UTC. Wind calm, visibility 200 metres (660 ft), fog, vertical visibility 200 feet (61 m), temperature 2 °C (36 °F), dewpoint 2 °C (36 °F), QNH 1021 hPA, altimeter setting 30.17 inches.)

== Investigation ==
The Iranian Civil Aviation Authority opened an investigation into the accident. On 26 January 2010, it was reported that Russia's Interstate Aviation Committee had joined the investigation.

The final accident report was released on 28 December 2012, listing the sole cause as pilot error.
