= Daniel Mahgerefteh =

Iranian murder victim (died 2012)

Daniel Mahgerefteh (Persian: دانیال ماه‌گرفته; died 2012) was an Iranian Jewish man who was murdered in suspicious circumstances after he was dating the daughter of a member of Iranian Revolutionary Guard Corps (IRGC). He was the son of a well-known businessman and one of the wealthiest Jewish families in Tehran. The Jewish community believed that he was murdered due to the relationship, but Iranian authorities said that the murder was about robbery.

The murder happened in December 2012 when "Mohammad D." who was a friend of the victim, shot him from close distance with a pistol. The murderer then stole two candle holders, one carpet, one electric guitar, one laptop and a BMW which was worth around 300 million tomans (about $100,000). The murderer said that the reason behind the killing was class differences and the fact that Daniel was belittling him for being poor. However, according to Armin Avi Kreuznacher, an Iranian-born Jew who emigrated from the country in 2010, Mahgerefteh was killed by the woman's family after the two had intimate relations and he refused to marry her. “The murder was carried out as revenge for dishonoring the family,” said Kreuznacher, who currently resides in Germany. Menashe Amir, an expert on Iran's Jewish community, told The Times of Israel that the official account of Mahgerefteh's murder was rife with inconsistencies.
