= Bahman Daroshafaei =

- Education: Industrial engineering
- Alma mater: Sharif University of Technology
- Occupations: journalist, translator, blogger and film maker

Bahman Daroshafaei (Persian: بهمن دارالشفایی) is an Iranian-British journalist, translator, blogger and film maker. Daroshafaei is a former journalist for the BBC's Persian service. Daroshafaei left BBC Persian in 2013 and returned to Iran. He had been working as a translator for Mahi Publishing Company and for an Iranian NGO.

In February 2016, Daroshafaei was arrested in Tehran, Iran, he was taken from his home by judiciary officers.

== Works ==
=== Translation ===
- Political Philosophy: A Very Short Introduction - David Miller
- Politics: A Very Short Introduction - Kenneth Minogue
- Address Unknown - Kathrine Taylor
- A Bear Called Paddington- Michael Bond
- Down and Out in Paris and London- George Orwell

=== Filmography ===
- Farhad's Fridays, a documentary about Farhad Mehrad
