= Abbas Moayeri =

Iranian-born French sculptor and painter (1939–2020)

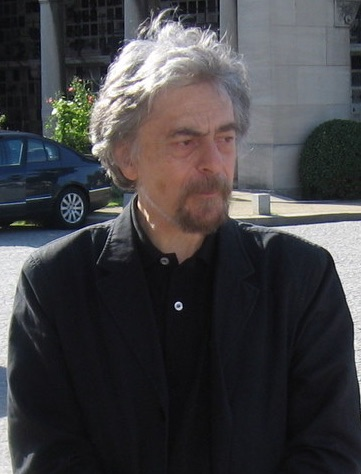
- Abbas Moayeri
- Born: 27 February 1939; Rasht, Imperial State of Iran
- Died: 24 October 2020 (aged 81); Paris, France
- Occupations: Sculptor; Painter

Abbas Moayeri (27 February 1939 – 24 October 2020) was an Iranian-born French sculptor and painter.

== Biography ==
Moayeri earned a bachelor's degree in traditional arts in 1960. He completed his master's degree in decorative sculpture at the Faculty of Decorative Arts in Tehran. In 1984, he became a junior professor at the Association pour le Développement de l’Animation Culturelle in Paris. At the end of 1989, he became affiliated with the Ancient Mystical Order Rosae Crucis. Throughout his career, he lived in Paris, dividing his time between teaching, working, and showing exhibitions.

Abbas Moayeri died in Paris on 24 October 2020.

== Awards ==
- Silver Medal of the Mérite et Dévouement français (1984)
- Silver Medal of the Société Académique Arts-Sciences-Lettres (1985)
- Silver Medal of the Fédération nationale de la culture française (1985)

== Expositions ==
- Iran (1958, 1967)
- Salon des Surindépendants, Paris (1973)
- Rose-Croix Amorc, Paris (1989, 1991)
- Fast Gallery at Columbia University, New York City (1993)
