= Hamid Kahram =

Iranian politician and veterinarian (c.1958–2020)

Hamid Kohram

Member of the Parliament of Iran
- In office 2000–2004
- Constituency: Ahwaz

Personal details
- Born: c. 1958 Abadan, Khuzestan Province, Imperial State of Iran
- Died: 19 March 2020 (aged 61–62) Tehran, Iran
- Cause of death: COVID-19

Hamid Kohram (Persian: حمید کهرام; c. 1958 – 19 March 2020) was an Iranian politician and veterinarian who served as a member of the Iranian Parliament representing Ahwaz between 2000 and 2004. He was also the Director General of Scholarships Office and Student Exchange, Ministry of Science, Research and Technology.

During the 2017 presidential election, Kohram was the head of Hassan Rouhani's campaign in Khuzestan province.

Kohram died from COVID-19 on 19 March 2020.
