= Gohardasht Prison =

Prison located in Gohardasht, Iran

Coordinates: 35.8681°N 50.9789°E

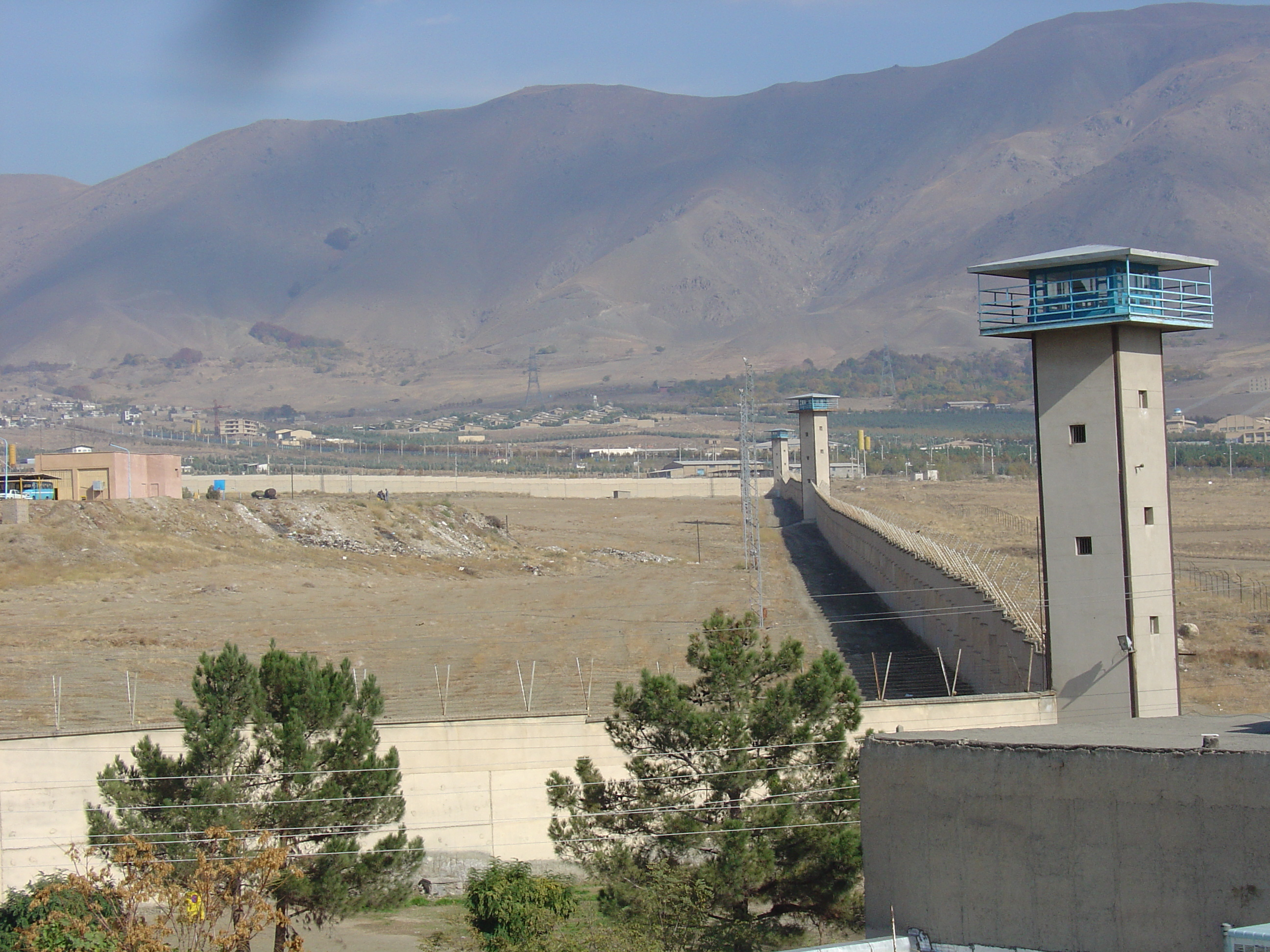
- A view of Rajai Shahr Prison
- Interactive map of Gohardasht Prison
- Location: Mo'ezzen Boulevard, Gohardasht, Karaj, Alborz Province, Iran
- Status: Closed
- Opened: 1982
- Closed: 2023
- Former name: Gohardasht Prison, "Ajayeb Shahr" (City of Wonders)
- Managed by: Judicial system of Iran

Gohardasht Prison (Persian: زندان گوهردشت) is a prison in Gohardasht, a town in the northern outskirt of Karaj, approximately 20 km (12 miles) west of Tehran.

Sometimes spelled Gohar Dasht Prison, it is also known as "Rajai Shahr", Rajaishahr, Raja’i Shahr, Reja’i Shahr, Rajayi Shahr, Rajaee Shahr, Rajaei Shahr or "Rajaï Shahr Prison", etc. and sometimes as Karadj or Karaj prison (but Qezel Hesar prison is also near Karaj). In Google Maps it is listed as "Rajai-Shahr Prison, Karaj, Tehran, Iran". Political prisoners and prisoners of conscience tend to be sent to Ward 12 of the prison. In 2012, The Guardian reported that Gohardasht is regarded as one of Iran's harshest prisons because of its many reported cases of torture, rape and murder. IRGC has solitary confinement cells in Gohardasht Prison.

In the immediate aftermath of the Islamic Revolution, there were many systematic executions and interrogations of former members of the overthrown monarchy and military.

During the 1980s, members of liberal, Marxist, and socialist groups (mostly university students) and supporters of The People's Mujahedin of Iran who opposed the theocratic government were imprisoned and many of them were executed. Mass executions of political prisoners, in particular in Gohardasht and in Evin, took place during the 1988 executions of Iranian political prisoners.

Imprisoned student activist Majid Tavakoli was transferred to Gohardasht Prison in August 2010.

In June 2012, the organization Campaign to Free Political Prisoners in Iran raised a serious concern with EU Parliament representatives on the situation of political prisoners in Gohardasht Prison: ailing political prisoners are deprived from urgent medical attention, putting their lives at risk.

On 13 September 2015, Iranian union activist Shahrokh Zamani died while imprisoned in Gohardasht.

Amnesty International spoke out against the prison's practice of blinding prisoners in eye for an eye justice in 2015.

In October 2016, political prisoners protested against violations of their basic rights, saying that these violations were causing various harms and health challenges and leading to the "slow death of prisoners." The quality of food has decreased recently to the point that many of the prisoners are suffering from malnutrition.

On 7 October 2017, Gholam Reza Ziaei replaced Mr. Mardani as director of Gohardasht Prison.

== See also ==
- 1988 executions of Iranian political prisoners
- Tudeh Party of Iran: Suppression
- Persecution of Baháʼís
- Anti-Sunnism
- Evin Prison
- Human rights in Iran: Notable prisons
- Judicial system of Iran: Prison system
- White torture: Iran
- Mahmoud Ahmadinejad: Human rights
