= Farzaneh Taidi =

Iranian actress (1945–2020)

- فرزانه تأییدی
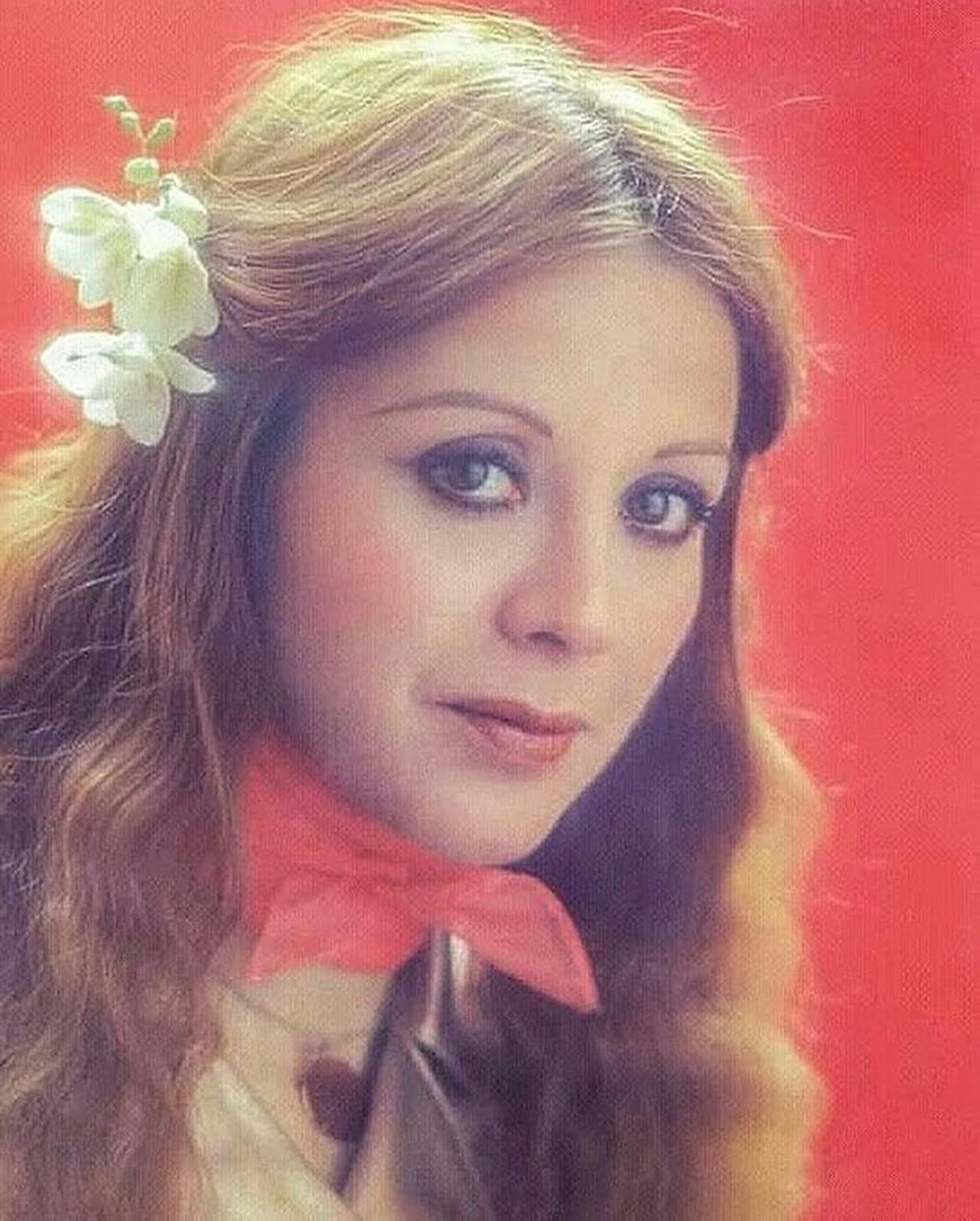
- Born: 1945; Tehran, Iran
- Died: 23 March 2020 (aged 74); London, United Kingdom
- Occupation: Actress
- Years active: 1962–1992
- Spouse: Parviz Kardan (divorced)
- Partner: Behrouz Behnezhad (–2020)
- Children: Keyvan

Farzaneh Taidi (Persian: فرزانه تأییدی; also spelled Ta'yidi or Tayidi, 1945 – March 23, 2020) was an Iranian theater and film actress. After studying theater and acting in Los Angeles, she debuted in the controversial film, Hashtoumine Rooze Haffteh (literally: The Eighth Day of the Week), one of the first Iranian films to center on a female protagonist. For her role in this film she won a Seppas award for "Best Actress" at the Tehran International Film Festival.

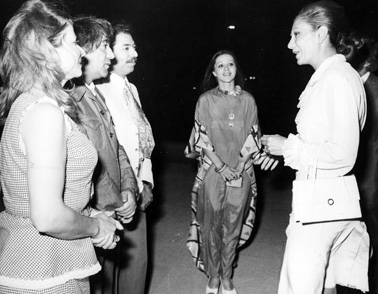
Empress Farah Pahlavi talking to artists Farzaneh Taidi, Ali Nassirian, and Ezzatolah Entezami at the Shiraz Arts Festival

== Films ==
Year	Title	Persian Title	Role
1971	The Hell + me	جهنم + من; Jahannam be Ezafe-ye Man	Zari
1972	The Eighth Day of the Week	هشتمین روز هفته; Hashtomin Ruz-e Hafteh	Leili
1972	The Soil	خاک; Xak	Shokat
1974	Salat-e Zohr	صلات ظهر; Salat-e Zohr	Suri
1976	The Dealers	واسطه‌ها; Vaaseteh-ha	Mohtaram
1976	A Cry Under Water	فریاد زیر آب; Faryad Zir-e Ab	Azar
1976	The Journey of the Stone	سفر سنگ; Safar-e Sang	Cleric's daughter
1981	My Heritage, Insanity	میراث من جنون; Miraas-e Man jonun	Goli
1991	Not Without My Daughter	بدون دخترم هرگز; Bedun-e Doxtaram Hargez	Shahin
