= 2014 Tehran dust storm =

Lethal dust storm in Tehran

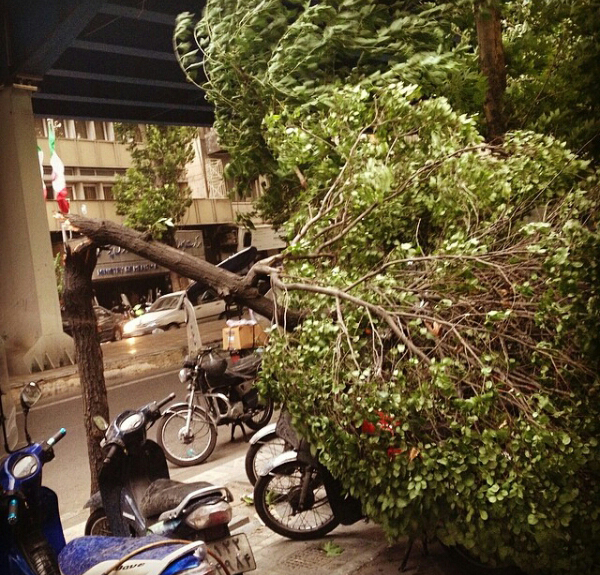

Meteorological history
- Formed: June 2, 2014

Dust storm
- Meteorological Organization of Iran
- Highest winds: 120 km/h (75 mph)

Dust storm
- Institute of Geophysics
- Highest winds: 150 km/h (90 mph)

Overall effects
- Fatalities: 4
- Damage: $16 million (2014 USD)
- Areas affected: Tehran County

A massive dust storm took place in Tehran on June 2, 2014 at 4:50pm (local time). 5 men were killed, more than 30 people were injured, and a few cars were destroyed. Falling trees, objects and balconies disconnected 65 of 1200 electric 20 KW lines.

During the spring of 2014, heavy rain and hailstorms struck the Iranian capital of Tehran, surprising residents and causing traffic jams across the city. The fierce June 2 storm, packed with thunder and lightning, battered the northern parts of Tehran and lasted for more than an hour. According to the Institute of Geophysics, the wind speed was 80 km/h; Meteorological Organization of Iran reported 120 km/h.
