= History of the judicial system of Iran =

Judicial system of Iran
- قوه قضاییه جمهوری اسلامی ایران
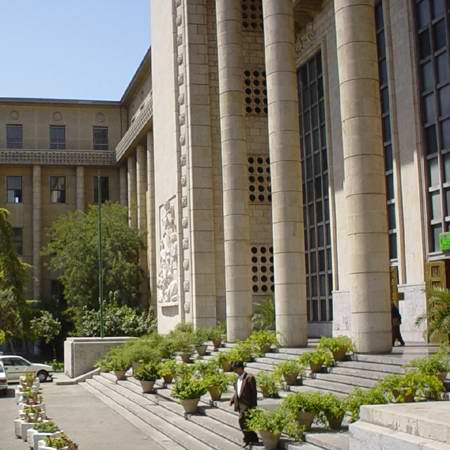
- Courthouse of Tehran
- Established: 1905
- Jurisdiction: Iran
- Location: Tehran
- Composition method: Supreme Leader selection with Judges approval
- Authorised by: Constitution of the Islamic Republic of Iran
- Judge term length: 5 years

Chief Justice
- Currently: Gholam-Hossein Mohseni-Eje'i
- Since: 1 July 2021

Deputy Chief Justice
- Currently: Hamzeh Khalili
- Since: 18 April 2024

A nationwide judicial system in Iran was first implemented and established by Abdolhossein Teymourtash under Reza Shah, with further changes during the reign of Mohammad Reza Pahlavi.

After the 1979 Iranian Revolution overthrew the Pahlavi dynasty, the system was greatly altered. The legal code is now based on Islamic law or sharia, although many aspects of civil law have been retained, and it is integrated into a civil law legal system. According to the constitution of the Islamic Republic, the judiciary in Iran "is an independent power" with a Ministry of Justice, head of the Supreme Court, and also a separate appointed Head of the Judiciary.

== History ==
=== Islam ===
According to one scholar, the administration of justice in Islamic Iran has been until recent times

a loosely sewn and frequently resewn patchwork of conflicting authority in which the different and sometimes conflicting sources for Islamic law—the jurists, the actual judges, and the non-Islamic law officials of the king—disputed with each other over the scope of their jurisdictions. ...

some aspects of the law always remained in the hands of the mullahs ... The village mullah was the natural arbiter in matters of marriage, divorce, and inheritance; and the exalted jurisconsult, in order to carry out the very function for which he was exalted, gave opinions on those matters of law on which he was consulted. In between the village mullah and the jurisconsult there were mullahs with courts which, while sometimes sanctioned by the royal government, depended for their power on the prestige of the presiding mullah judge as much or more than on the government's sanction

Since the sixteenth century AD Iran has been the only country in the world having Shi'ah Islam as its official religion, consequently the general principles of its legal system differed somewhat from those of other countries which followed Islamic law.

Among the ways, law in Iran and the rest of the Muslim world differed from European law was in its lack of a single law code. "Thirteen centuries of Islamic—more particularly Shiah—tradition" called for jurists to base decisions on their legal training as it applied to the situation being judged. There was also no appeal in traditional Islamic law.

One jurists's 'discovery' of the ruling of law for a specific case would not have been invalidated by some other jurist's discovery of a different ruling for that case; only God could choose between them, and until the Resurrection (or in the case of the Shiah, the return of the Twelfth Imam) God had left the matter to the jurists, and the first actual judgment was final, as otherwise there would have been an infinite regress of opinions without any final judgment. For the Shiah, ... resistance to a single written code was even stronger; the jurisconsult's right to describe the law in his own way was the very essence of the doctrine that had revived the jurisconsult school at the end of the 18th century."

As far as the judicial system is concerned, the changes were quite minor until the end of the nineteenth century.

=== 20th century ===
Major events marking the judicial history of Iran during the modern era include the Constitutional Revolution of 1906, which gave the country its first Constitution and Bill of Rights, the fall of the Qajars and the rise of the Pahlavi dynasty in the 1920s, when accession to a modern judicial organisation became one of Iran's greatest challenges, and the Islamic Revolution.

==== "Regime of capitulations" ====
As European military and technological power began to be felt in 19th century Iran, Westerners insisted on special treatment in Iranian courts. This came in the form of treaties between most European governments and Iran requiring the presence at the trial of any European in Iran of a representative of that European's home country, who would countersign the decision of the Iranian court, and without whose countersignature the "decision of the Iranian court could have no effect". The Europeans insisted on this legal veto right—" called the regime of capitulations"—on the grounds that Iran had no written legal code so that "no one knew what laws foreigners would be judged by." Iran followed the traditional Islamic practice of each judge giving his own interpretation of Islamic law for a given litigation, with no right of appeal.

Iranians in general opposed these capitulations, and secular Iranians such as Mohammed Mossadeq, wanted to establish a fixed written law they believed would not only end the capitulations but facilitate the building of a strong and unified state.

==== Reza Shah ====
Under the secularist reign of Reza Shah many changes were made in Iran's judicial system, and the establishment of a fixed written law with appeals courts was one of them. In March 1926, Minister of Judicial Affairs Ali-Akbar Davar dissolved Iran's entire judiciary, with the approval of the parliament, and initiating a wave of fundamental restructuring and overhauling reforms with the aid of French judicial experts. By April 1927, Iran had 600 newly appointed judges in Tehran. Davar subsequently attempted to expand the new system into other cities of Iran through a programme involving training of 250 judges.

Reza Shah represented his legal reforms as "tentative experiments" and allowed the religious judges to keep their courts for matters such as inheritance. In 1936, however, the new system was made permanent and the religious courts were abolished. However, there were still sharia courts that ruled on issues of family and inheritance up to the Islamic Revolution (working alongside secular ones). Some aspects of sharia law were also unofficially retained in criminal law, for example compensation was still unofficially given in a similar manner to blood money, in exchange for pardoning a murder death sentence in some cases.

The legal profession

According to Banakar and Ziaee, the history of the Iranian Bar Association (Kānūn-e Vūkalā-yeh Dādgūstarī) "can be traced back to the period after the 1906 Constitutional Revolution, when a modern legal system was established in Iran. The IBA was founded in 1915 and organised under the supervision of the judicial system until 1953, when it was granted legal personality. It operated as an independent civil society organisation for the next twenty-seven years, until it was closed in 1980 by the revolutionary government and its ranks and files were purged. It was reopened in 1991 under the control of the Head of the Judiciary and regained some of its independence in 1997 when President Khatami [...] won the general election. Since then, the numbers of lawyers have grown steadily to an estimated 60,000, and perhaps most significantly a large number of women have passed the Bar and joined the legal profession". "Since the 1979 Revolution, the IBA has been struggling to maintain its independence from the judiciary. As part of this conflict, a new body of lawyers was created by the Iranian government in 2001 and 'authorized to present cases in court' under Article 187 of the Law of Third Economic, Social and Cultural Development Plan (adopted in May 2000). [...] This group, whose membership in 2014 was estimated to exceed 20,000, is officially known as the Legal Advisors of the Judiciary."

=== Islamic Republic ===
In 1979, the secular, westernizing Pahlavi dynasty was overthrown and replaced by an Islamic Republic under the rule of Ayatollah Khomeini. While the revolution did not dismantle the Pahlavi judiciary in its entirety, it replaced secular-trained jurists "with seminary-educated ones, and codified more features of the sharia into state laws—especially the Law of Retribution." Women judges were also removed (although they could still be lawyers, or after 1997, secondary judges in civil cases).

Between 1979 and 1982, the entire pre-Revolutionary judiciary was purged, and their duties replaced by "Revolutionary Tribunals" set up in every town. These tribunals ruled on "Islamic law", but were in practice unfair, biased, and the judges were inexperienced and often incompetent. Many people were executed or given harsh punishments for both political and criminal acts. There were no appeals either, and trials often lasted minutes in an un-orthodox "court". In 1982, the regular court system was reinstated, but with the judges now trained in Islamic law. The Revolutionary Courts became a part of this court system, ruling in matters of "national security" such as drug trafficking and political and "anti-revolutionary" crimes, and were considered the "judicial arm of the regime". In 1982, in response to military coup threats, a separate "Military Revolutionary Court" was formed, handling military cases. The Retribution Law (Qisas) of 1982 replaced sections of the Public Punishment Law (1924).

==== Current system ====
The 1979 Constitution of the Islamic Republic calls Iran to have a Head of the Judiciary, also known in English as 'Chief Justice of Iran', who is to be a "just Mujtahid" (high level Islamic cleric) appointed by the Supreme Leader and to serve for "a period of five years." He is responsible for the "establishment of the organizational structure" of the judicial system; "drafting judiciary bills" for Parliament; hiring, firing, promoting and assigning judges. Judges cannot be dismissed without a trial.

Iran's prison system was "centralized and drastically expanded" by the Islamic Republic. Under the Shah prisons had been administered separately by SAVAK, the urban police, and the gendarmerie. The new regime entrusted their management "to a supervisory council of three clerics".

The Islamic Republic uses the Shia based Jaafari school of Islamic jurisprudence. After the election of the first Majles of the Islamic Republic in 1980, the Majles and the Guardian Council quickly codified important features of the sharia law by passing two landmark bills in July 1982: Sharia law includes Hudud ("claims against God", punishable by a mandatory, fixed sentence), Qisas (the law of retaliation/retribution), diyyeh, or blood money (to compensate for the death/injury), Qanon-e Ta'zir (tazir is a crime that receives a discretionary sentence by a judge), Qanon-e Qisas (Retribution Law).

The Supreme Audit Court of Iran regulates banking and financial operations and interest (riba) is forbidden.

In 1991–1994, Iran combined all of these laws into the unified "Islamic Penal Code" which consisted of five "Books". The new Islamic Penal Code was adopted in January 2012 and incorporates the bulk of penal laws in the IRI, replacing Books One through Four of the old code. Book Five of the Islamic Penal Code ("the only part of the Penal Code that has been adopted permanently and is not subject to experimental periods") passed on 22 May 1996.

Sharia in the IRI has been modified to some degree, according to one source, the new laws of the Islamic Republic "modify the sharia" (i.e. what Muslims believe is God's legislation) "in three significant ways": allowing the appeal of decisions, the use of circumstantial evidence in cases, and long-term imprisonment as a punishment.

In a 2013 poll by Pew Research Center, 83% of Iranians favored the use of Islamic law. In a question asked only of Iranian Muslims, a plurality (45%) felt that the law already followed Sharia somewhat closely, and a further 37% thought it followed Sharia very closely.

== See also ==
- Judicial system of the Islamic Republic of Iran
- Blasphemy law in Iran
- Censorship in Iran
- Constitution of the Islamic Republic of Iran
- Corruption in Iran
- Crime in Iran
- Human rights in the Islamic Republic of Iran
- Intellectual property in Iran
- Iran Tribunal
- Iran's Family Protection Law
- Iranian Cyber Police
- Iranian labor law
- Iranian nationality law
- Law Enforcement Forces of Islamic Republic of Iran
- List of economic laws in Iran
- List of national legal systems
- Parading on donkey
- Special Clerical Court
- Taxation in Iran
- Traffic police of Iran
- Chief Justice of Iran
