= Mojahed Kourkour =

Iranian protester (1982-2025)

- مجاهد کورکور
- Born: Abbas Kourkouri; 1982 (age 43–44); Izeh, Khuzestan, Iran
- Died: June 11, 2025
- Cause of death: Hanging for Hirabah

Abbas Kourkouri (Persian: عباس کورکوری), known as Mojahed Kourkour (Persian: مجاهد کورکور, 1982- 11 June 2025), was one of the detainees of the Mahsa Amini protests in Izeh. The Islamic Republic's judiciary stated that Kourkour was the main suspect in the shooting of protesters in Izeh on 16 November 2022. Seven citizens, including Kian Pirfalak, died in the shooting.

== Arrest ==
During the attack by the Islamic Republic of Iran Armed Forces with heavy weapons on December 20, 2022 on the village of Par Surakh, Bagh-e Malek, Mojahed and one other person were arrested, and two of his companions, Mahmoud Ahmadi and Hossein Saeedi, were killed.

== Confession ==
Kourkour's relatives say he was tortured to force a confession, and the Islamic Republic is trying to identify Korkour as one of the perpetrators of the Izeh Bazaar attack. Korkour has been charged with war, intimidation, and corruption on earth, disrupting public order, causing major bodily harm resulting in the deaths of seven people, including Kian Pirfalak, causing major damage to public and private property, and forming and joining a rebel group through an armed uprising against the Islamic Republic of Iran. On Friday, April 7, 2023 the Mizan News Agency reported that Kourkour, a protester imprisoned for “war, intimidation, and corruption on earth,” had been sentenced to death. The court has identified him as the perpetrator of Kian Pirfalak's murder. However, Kian's family does not consider Kourkourto be the culprit and says the government is trying to pin the murder of their children on him. Sajjad Pirfalak, Kian Pirfalak's uncle, announced that, at the request of the family of Kourkour and with the consent of Kian's family, Davoud Shah Wali, the Pirfalak family's lawyer, has accepted the representation of Kourkour's case and officially became his lawyer.

== Reaction ==
Gol-Anbar Kourkour, the mother of Mojahed, asked people in a short video message to help prevent her son's execution.

On December 26, 2022, during the 40th anniversary of Kian Pirfalak’s death in the village of Parchestan-e Gurui, people supported Mojahed Kourkour and shouted slogans warning against his execution.

Canadian MP Anita Vandenbeld has called for a halt to the execution. Vandenbeld wrote on X: “I join many other human rights defenders and Iranian activists today in calling on Iran to stop the imminent execution of #MojahedKourkour on false charges. I am politically sponsoring Mojahed Kourkour.”

== Execution ==
Kourkour was executed on June 11, 2025. He is the eleventh Iranian citizen to be executed in connection with the nationwide protests of 2022 known as "Woman, Life, Freedom."

== See also ==
- Detainees of the Mahsa Amini protests
- Capital punishment in Iran
- Timeline of the Mahsa Amini protests
- Death sentences during the Mahsa Amini protests
