= 2022 in Iran =

- Decades: 2000s; 2010s; 2020s
- See also: Other events of 2022; Years in Iran

Events in the year 2022 in Iran, which is dominated by protests.

The situation in Iran remains complex and challenging, as the country has long defied international norms and supported militants abroad. In 2018, the Trump administration withdrew from the 2015 nuclear agreement with Iran and imposed sanctions as part of a "maximum pressure" campaign. In 2020, Iran recalculated its strategy after the US killed a top Iranian commander. In 2021, the Biden administration attempted to revive the nuclear deal, but talks were deadlocked as of fall 2022. Protests over human rights abuses and the death of Mahsa Amini in September 2022 evolved into calls for the end of the Islamic Republic. The US Institute of Peace works to inform policymakers on Iran and provide a forum for virtual diplomacy. It offers expert analysis, briefings for lawmakers, and resources for the public.

== Incumbents ==
- Supreme Leader of Iran: Ali Khamenei
- President of Iran: Ebrahim Raisi
- Speaker of the Parliament: Mohammad Bagher Ghalibaf
- Chief Justice: Gholam-Hossein Mohseni-Eje'i

== Events ==
Ongoing - 2021–2022 Iranian protests (2022 Iranian food protests and Mahsa Amini protests); Sistan and Baluchestan insurgency

- 16 March - Anoosheh Ashoori and Nazanin Zaghari-Ratcliffe released from prison
- 5 April - Imam Reza shrine stabbings
- 23 May - Abadan building collapse
- 8 June - 2022 South Khorasan train derailment
- 2 July - 2022 Hormozgan earthquakes
- 16 September - Guidance Patrol officers beat 22-year old Mahsa Amini to death in Tehran for not wearing her hijab properly, sparking major protests across the country.
- 30 September - 2022 Zahedan massacre
- 5 October - 2022 West Azerbaijan earthquake
- 15 October - Evin Prison fire
- 26 October - Shah Cheragh massacre

== Deaths ==
- 16 September – Mahsa Amini, 22, victim of police brutality (b. 2000)
- 19 September – Farjad Darvishi, 23, shot to death during the Mahsa Amini protests (b. 1999)
- 20 September – Minoo Majidi, 62, shot to death during the Mahsa Amini protests (b. 1960)
- 20 September – Nika Shakarami, 16, abducted (on that date) and later reported dead during the Mahsa Amini protests (b. 2005)
- 21 September – Hadis Najafi, 22, shot to death during the Mahsa Amini protests (b. 2000)
- 23 September – Sarina Esmailzadeh, 16, beaten to death during the Mahsa Amini protests (b. 2006)
- 12 October – Asra Panahi, 15, beaten to death during the Mahsa Amini protests (b. 2007)
- 23 October – Amou Haji, 94, man who did not wash for over 60 years (b. 1928)
