= 2021 in Iran =

- Decades: 2000s; 2010s; 2020s
- See also: Other events of 2021; Years in Iran

Events in the year 2021 in Iran.

== Incumbents ==
- Supreme Leader of Iran: Ali Khamenei
- President of Iran: Hassan Rouhani (until 3 August), Ebrahim Raisi (from 3 August)
- Speaker of the Parliament: Mohammad Bagher Ghalibaf
- Chief Justice: Ebrahim Raisi (until 1 July), Gholam-Hossein Mohseni-Eje'i (from 1 July)

== Events ==
Ongoing – COVID-19 pandemic in Iran

=== January ===
- 8 January – Supreme Leader Ali Khamenei announces that Iran will ban the import of COVID-19 vaccines from France, the United Kingdom, and the United States, and that it will instead obtain a vaccine from other countries.
- 26 January – Iran approves Russia’s Sputnik V COVID-19 vaccine for import and local production, as nation wide cases exceede 1.38 million with 57,560 deaths.

=== February ===
- 16 February – Photojournalist Noushin Jafari is arrested and transferred to Qarchak prison for “spreading propaganda against the state” and “insulting the sanctities.”
- 22 February – The IRGC block the Eskan border road in Saravan, reportedly opening fire and killing at least 10 people.

=== March ===
- 23 March –
  - Four Kurdish citizens are arrested in Ney village, Marivan, for participating in Nowruz celebrations.
  - Urmia Central Prison authorities reportedly reduce food rations to a quarter and threaten prisoners with seven-month sentence extensions for protesting.

=== April ===
- 6 April – Iran and the U.S. begin indirect negotiations in Vienna around restoring a nuclear deal, as talks with European nations fail to reach agreement.
- 11 April – Iran announces a blackout at a nuclear facility, suspectedly caused by an Israeli cyberattack.
- 16 April – Iran begins enriching uranium up to 60%, its highest level ever and approaching weapons-grade levels of 90%.

=== May ===
- 10 May – Iran publicly confirms it is holding talks with Saudi Arabia, pledging to make its best efforts to resolve longstanding regional tensions between the two countries.
- 20 May – Reports emerge that Iran has begun to form smaller, elite militia groups from Iraqi factions loyal to the Quds Force, shifting from reliance on larger public militias.

=== June ===
- 19 June – Workers stage strikes in Tehran's metro system, Qeshm’s Sina Refinery, and Asaloye’s Farab Bidkhoon Power Plant over unpaid wages.
- 20 June – Iranian dissidents Mohammad Hossein Sepehri and Kamal Yazdi, on hunger strike, are beaten in prison while protesting being denied phone calls.
- 23 June – Security forces and municipal agents attack residents in Qaleh-ye Sadri protesting home demolitions.

=== July ===
- 1 July – Ahmad Jannati is reelected as the chairman of the Assembly of Experts.
- 17 July – Two people go missing after vehicles are swept away by flash floods in Baft County, Kerman Province.
- 20 July – Protests over water shortages and drought sweep Khuzestan and other regions, with clashes causing deaths and anti-government demonstrations amid the broader economic and social unrest.
- 27 July – Swedish prosecutors announce the prosecution of an Iranian citizen for war crimes and murder during 1988.

=== August ===
- 5 August – President-elect Ebrahim Raisi is sworn in as the new president of Iran.
- 14 August – Iranian authorities arrest six prominent human rights lawyers and activists working on COVID-19 accountability cases.
- 15 August – Iran announces preparations to provide temporary refuge for Afghans fleeing the Taliban conflict, while encouraging many refugees to return home due to economic pressures.
- 31 August – The Iranian military prosecutor's office indicts 10 officials over the downing of Ukraine International Airlines Flight 752 in 2020.

=== September ===
- 9 September – The IRGC launch missile attacks on Kurdish opposition bases (KDPI) in the Kurdistan Region of Iraq.
- 26 September – Human rights defender Narges Mohammadi is summoned to serve a 30-month prison sentence.

=== October ===
- 1 October – Iran holds military exercises near the Azerbaijan border amid rising tensions, while criticizing Israel’s foreign minister visiting Bahrain.

=== November ===
- 1 November – The Guardian Council passes a “rejuvenation of the population and support of family” bill, limiting contraception and abortion access.
- 19 November – Protests resume in Isfahan over drought and water diversion in the Isfahan province.

=== December ===
- 27 December – Iran-U.S. nuclear talks in Vienna are held, focused on lifting international sanctions.

== Deaths ==
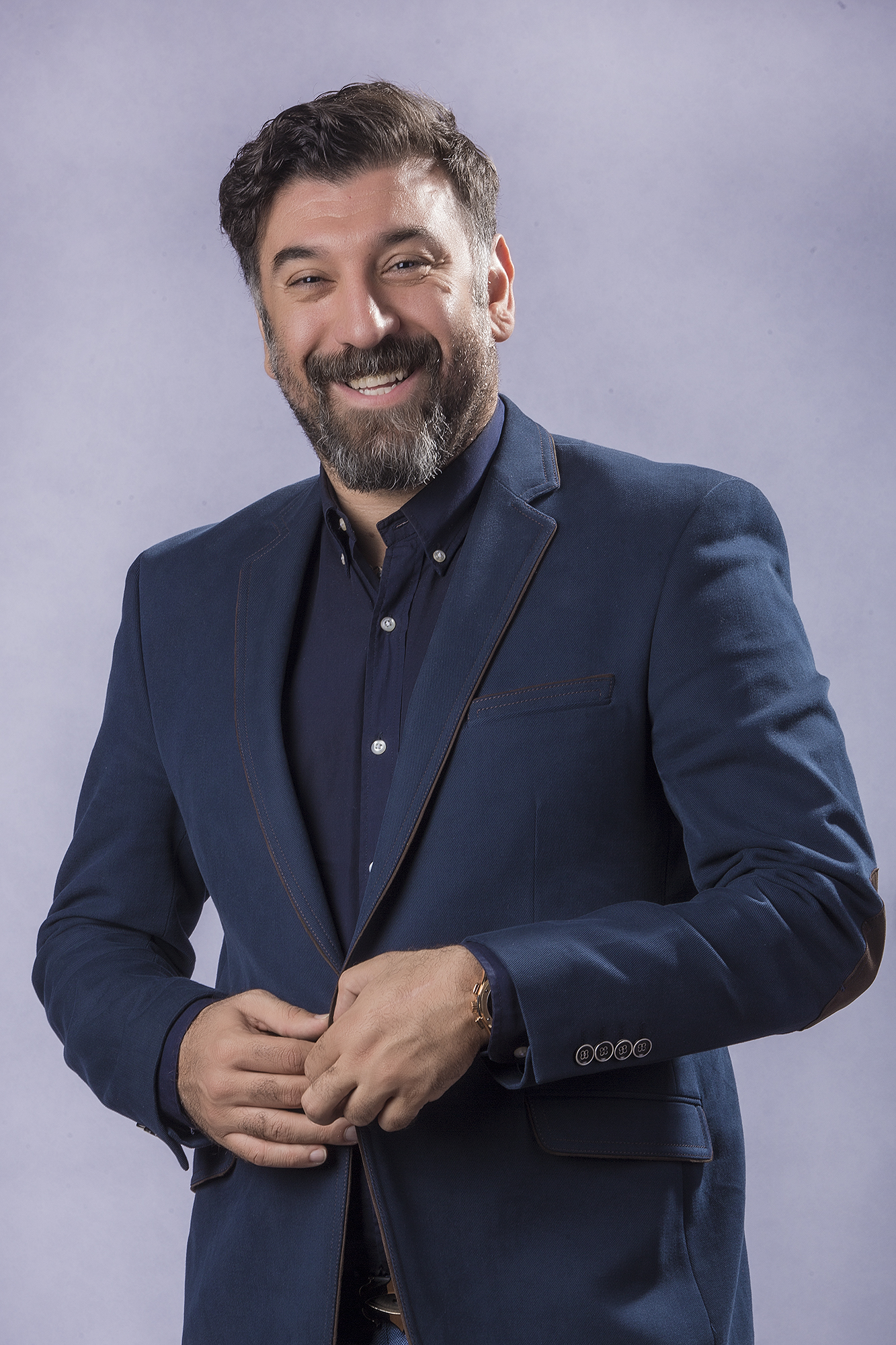
Ali Ansarian

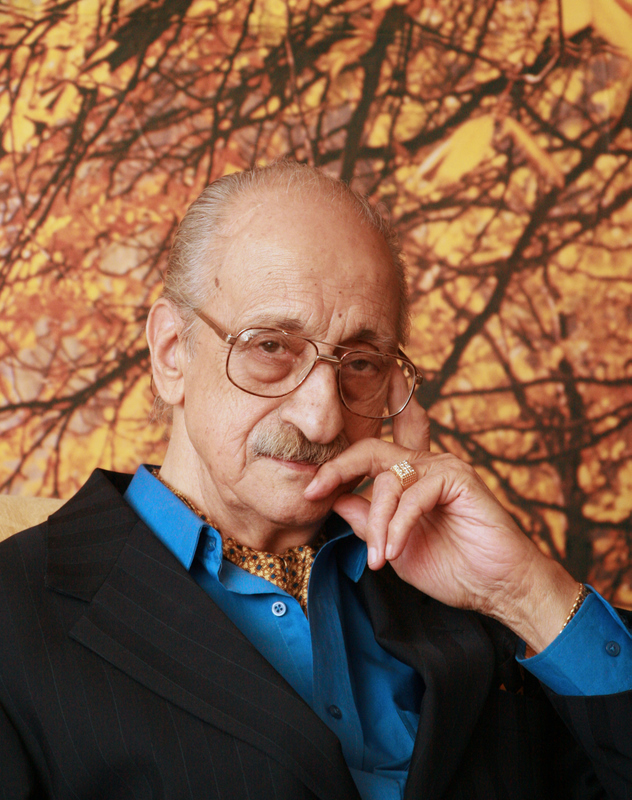
Abdolvahab Shahidi

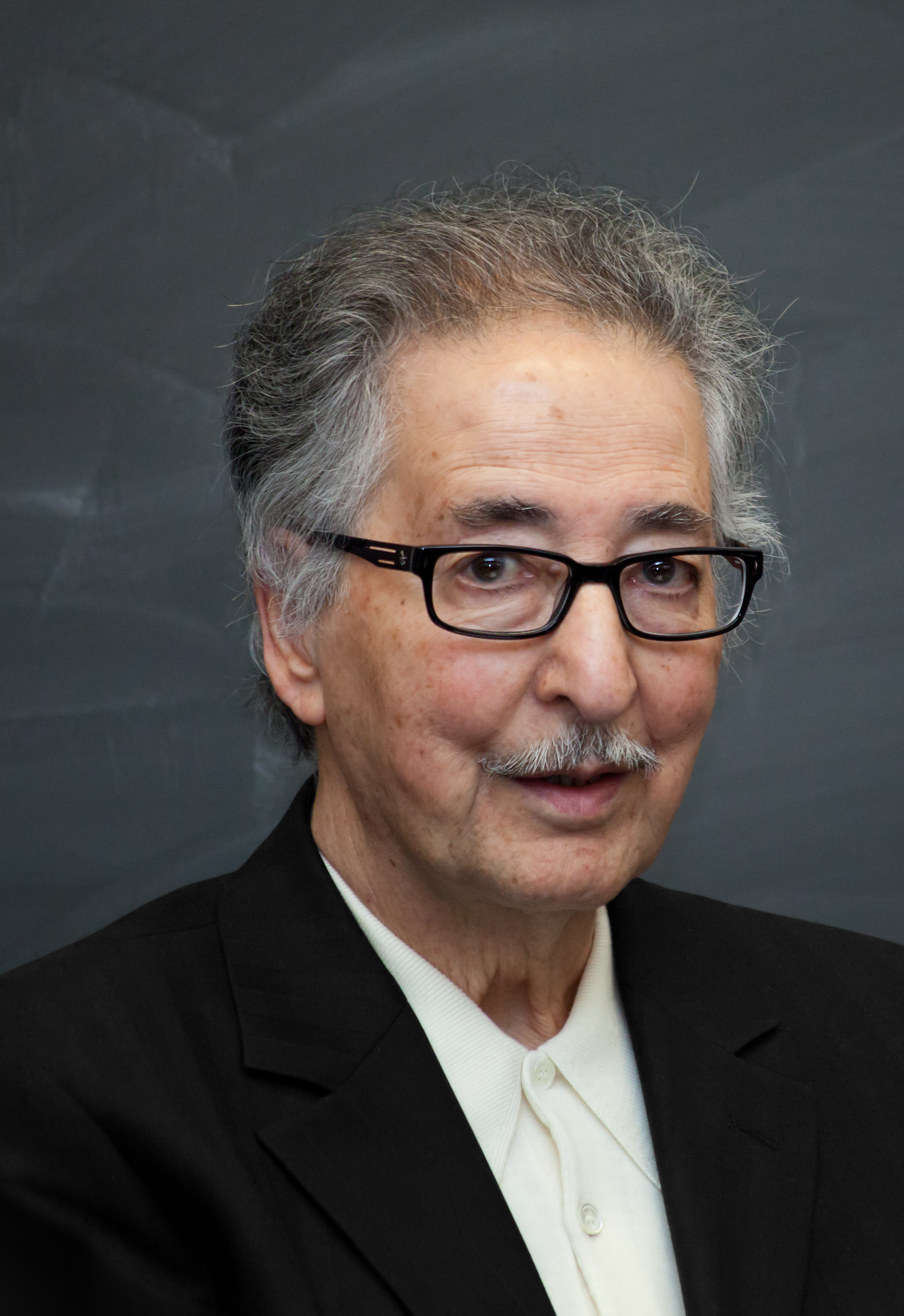
Abolhassan Banisadr

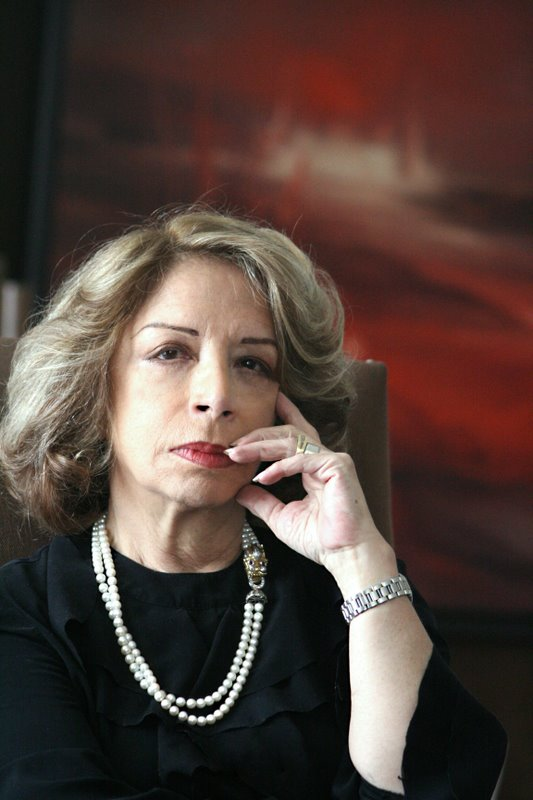
Iran Darroudi

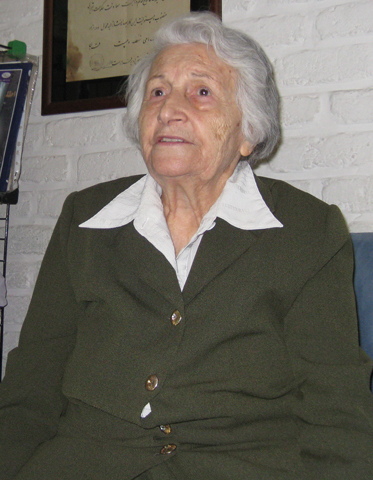
Mahlagha Mallah

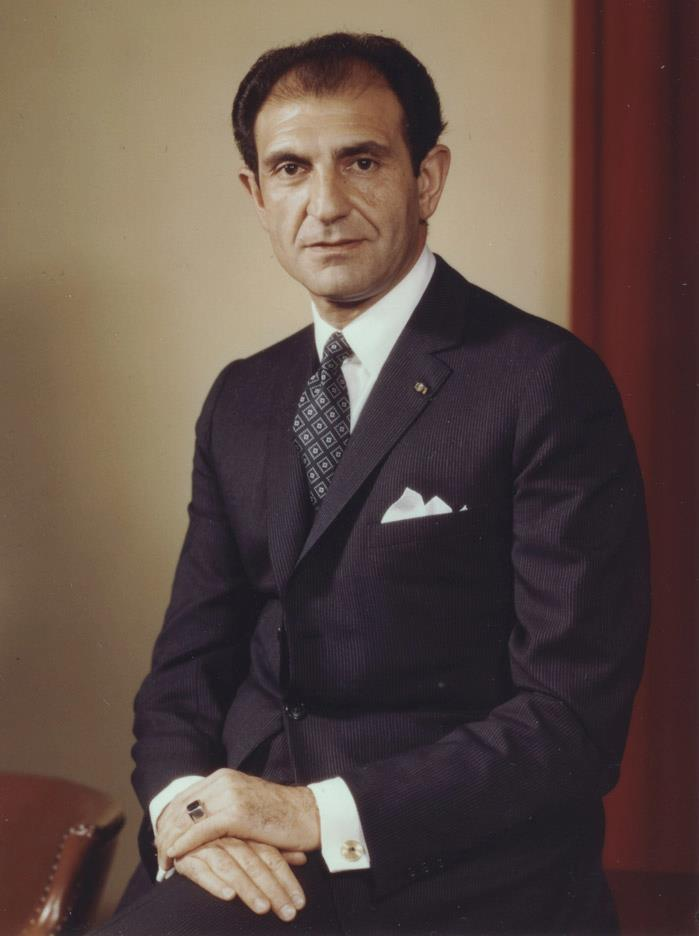
Ardeshir Zahedi

- 1 January – Mohammad-Taqi Mesbah-Yazdi, 85, cleric and politician (b. 1935)
- 9 January – Mehdi Attar-Ashrafi, 72, weightlifter (b. 1948)
- 12 January – Mahmoud Kianoush, 86, poet (b. 1934)
- 27 January – Mehrdad Minavand, 45, footballer (b. 1975)
- 3 February – Ali Ansarian, 43, footballer (b. 1977)
- 15 February – Golnoush Khaleghi, 80, musician (b. 1941)
- 17 February – Iraj Kaboli, 82, writer (b. 1938)
- 18 February – Amir Aslan Afshar, 101, politician and diplomat (b. 1919)
- 27 February – Nozar Azadi, 83, actor (b. 1938)
- 26 March – Azade Namdari, 36, TV host (b. 1984)
- 14 April – Mohsen Ghazi-Moradi, 80, actor (b. 1941)
- 15 April – Vartan Gregorian, 87, academic (b. 1934)
- 16 April – Nader Dastneshan, 60, football coach (b. 1960)
- 18 April – Mohammad Hejazi, 65, military commander (b. 1956)
- 26 April – Hamid Jasemian, 84, footballer (b. 1936)
- 10 May – Abdolvahab Shahidi, 98, singer (b. 1922)
- 16 May – Akbar Torkan, 68, politician (b. 1952)
- 25 May – Esmail Khoi, 82, poet (b. 1938)
- 7 June – Ali Akbar Mohtashamipur, 73, politician (b. 1947)
- 7 June – Sasan Niknafs, 35, political prisoner (b. 1985)
- 11 June – Parviz Kardan, 84, actor (b. 1936)
- 23 June – Hamid Mojtahedi, 79, director (b. 1942)
- 15 July – Hamid Reza Sadr, 65, journalist (b. 1956)
- 28 July – Shahrum Kashani, 47, singer (b. 1974)
- 31 July – Jalal Sattari, 89, writer (b. 1931)
- 4 August – Arsha Aghdasi, 39, stuntman actor (b. 1982)
- 8 August – Alireza Azizi, 72, footballer (b. 1949)
- 12 August – Ali Soleimani, 50, actor (b. 1970)
- 16 August – Fereshteh Taerpour, 68, film producer (b. 1953)
- 16 August – Hormoz Farhat, 93, musician (b. 1928)
- 19 August – Parviz Kardevani, 90, geographer (b. 1931)
- 3 September – Hassan Firouzabadi, 70, military commander (b. 1951)
- 8 September – Abbas Ansarifard, 65, football administrator (b. 1956)
- 25 September – Hassan Hassanzadeh Amoli, 93, cleric (b. 1928)
- 30 September – Hassan Tarighat Monfared, 74, politician (b. 1946)
- 5 October – Fathali Oveisi, 75, actor (b. 1946)
- 7 October – Azartash Azarnoush, 83, scholar (b. 1938)
- 9 October – Abolhassan Banisadr, 88, politician (b. 1933)
- 27 October – Aramesh Dustdar, 90, philosopher (b. 1931)
- 29 October – Iran Darroudi, 85, painter (b. 1936)
- 2 November – Cyrus Amouzgar, 87, politician (b. 1934)
- 6 November – Kambiz Derambakhsh, 79, cartoonist (b. 1942)
- 8 November – Mahlagha Mallah, 104, environmental activist (b. 1917)
- 18 November – Ardeshir Zahedi, 93, politician (b. 1928)
- 20 December – Hasan Irlu, 61–62, diplomat (b. 1959)
