= Par Surakh =

Par Surakh (Persian: پرسوراخ) may refer to:

- Par Surakh, Bagh-e Malek
- Par Surakh, Izeh
