= Deaths during the Mahsa Amini protests =

People killed due to protests in Iran

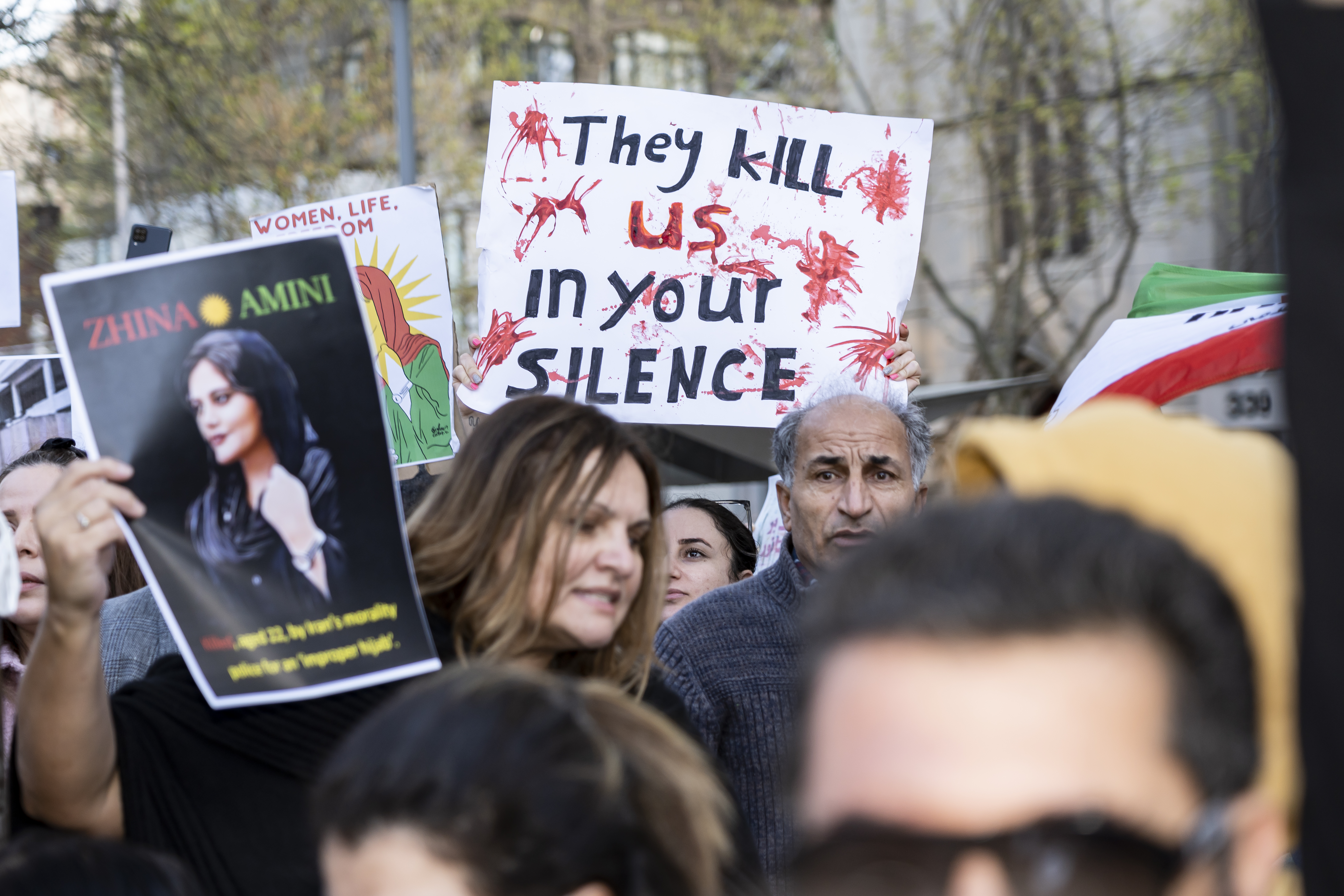
Solidarity demonstration in Melbourne, September 2022

Deaths during the Mahsa Amini protests refer to those people who were killed due to Iran's nationwide protests of 2022, triggered by the death of 22-year-old Kurdish Iranian Jina Mahsa Amini on September 16, 2022, in a Tehran hospital under suspicious circumstances.

The Guidance Patrol, the religious morality police of Iranian government, arrested Amini for allegedly not wearing the hijab in accordance with government standards. The Law Enforcement Command of the Islamic Republic of Iran stated that she had a heart attack at a police station, collapsed, and fell into a coma before being transferred to a hospital. However, eyewitnesses, including women who were detained with Amini, reported that she was severely beaten and that she died as a result of police brutality, which was denied by the Iranian authorities. The assertions of police brutality, in addition to leaked medical scans, led some observers to believe Amini had a cerebral hemorrhage or stroke due to head injuries received after her arrest.

== Documentation ==
During the protests that followed, many young women and men, including children, were shot or killed in the street or executed in prison without trial, or died as a result of mistreatment and torture. The perpetrators are usually members of the religious police, the paramilitary Basijis, the Iranian Revolutionary Guards Corps (IRGC) or prison guards. The killings and mistreatments are being carried out systematically on orders from the regime to use ruthless violence to suppress the protests and deter the population from further participation. They are internationally regarded as serious human rights crimes.

Since the beginning of the protests, human rights organizations, news agencies specializing in Iran, quality media, and domestic and foreign Iranian opposition groups have continuously collected testimonies from inside Iran, verified the information as much as possible, and then provided reports on the reliably identified fatalities and essential information about their deaths released. Documentaries on this come from the news agencies IranWire, the Human Rights Activists News Agency (HRANA) and Iran International, Amnesty International, the Hengaw Organization for Human Rights (Hengaw), Iran Human Rights (IHR), the Iran Human Rights Monitor (IHRM) and the National Council of Resistance of Iran (NCRI). Media such as The New York Times, Washington Post, The Guardian, Der Spiegel, Der Tagesspiegel, Die Zeit and others have published many names of victims in the context of their reports on Iran.

== Statistics ==
Number of protesters killed by province and county.

As of October 5, 2022, HRANA registered 342 civil protest gatherings in all 31 provinces of Iran, including 266 street protests in 105 major cities and 76 student protests in all 69 universities in the country. The police and Basijis used tear gas, rubber and metal bullets and live ammunition to disperse the gatherings, killing hundreds of unarmed people. In the first three weeks, HRANA initially identified 200 fatalities, including 18 children and adolescents, largely through analysis of video footage and testimonies received from Iran.

By the end of October 2022, NCRI announced 280 identified protesters were killed in the protests and put the total death toll at 450 so far, similar to IHRM. By November 2, 2022, IHR registered at least 277 people killed in the protests and in custody, including 40 children. IHR is investigating numerous unconfirmed reports of further killings and also expects dozens of executions of those arrested on arbitrary death sentences. As of November 5, 2022, at least 314 people have been killed in protests in Iran, including 47 minors and 38 security forces, according to HRANA and more than 14,000 were arrested. Following a massacre by regime forces in Khash on November 4, 2022, NCRI reported 324 identified fatalities. By December 17, 2022, at least 469 people have been killed. 374 of the deaths were men and 63 of the deaths were children and 32 were women. 39 protesters are also at risk of execution

According to the Iranian government, around 200 people have died during the protest. Human rights activists assume a high number of unreported deaths. A reason for this is that the Iranian regime arbitrarily arrests or kidnaps thousands of people, kills many without a process of law, and instead of handing over their bodies to their relatives, disappears them. Media research and criminal investigations are forbidden under the dictatorship of Iran, and are being done illegally and then associated with great risks and danger for witnesses, investigative journalists, human rights activists and lawyers.

The National Security Council (Iran) announced that investigations by relevant authorities show that as a result of the aforementioned riots, more than 200 people have lost their lives so far, which can be divided into the following categories: security martyrs, public martyrs in terrorist acts, innocent people who were victims of the killing project of groups, innocent people who died in conditions of security chaos, rioters, and armed counter-revolutionary elements who are members of separatist groups.

== List of victims ==
The documentation from HRANA (1), IranWire (2), Der Spiegel (3), Amnesty International (4), Iran Human Rights (5) and NCRI (6) regularly includes the names of the fatalities and, where ascertained, their ages and the date, place and cause of death. The following list presents the most important published information in chronological order.

People killed by regime officials in protests in Iran since September 16, 2022
Date of death 2022	Name	Age	Location	Circumstances of death	Ref.
16 September	Mahsa Jina Amini	22	Tehran	She was arrested because a headscarf had slipped and was transferred to a hospital after an hour's detention. She died there after three days in a coma, probably as a result of severe blows to the head. A CT scan of it shows a skull fracture, cerebral hemorrhage and bruising.	
18 September	Fouad Ghadimi	~40	Divandareh	Gunshot wound	1, 2, 3,
19 September	Hajar Abbasi	~70	Mahabad	Gunshot wound	1
19 September	Fardin Bakhtiari		Sanandaj	Gunshot wound	1, 3
19 September	Iman Behzadpour		Sanandaj		6
19 September	Reza Lotfi	~25	Sanandaj	Gunshot wound	1, 3,
19 September	Aysan Madanpasand		Tabriz	Beating	1
19 September	Fereydoun Mahmoudi	32	Saqqez	Gunshot wound	1, 3,
19 September	Mohsen Mohammadi	28	Divandareh	Gunshot wound	1, 3,
20 September	Sasan Bagheri		Rezvanshahr	Gunshot wound	1, 2
20 September	Farjad Darvishi	23	Balo, Urmia	Gunshot wound	1, 3,
20 September	Zakaria Khial / Khayal	16	Piranshahr	Targeted close-range shots and club blows inflicted serious wounds on him, causing him to bleed to death.	1, 3, 4, 5,
20 September	Erfan Khazaei		Zahedan	Gunshot wound	1, 2
20 September	Farzin Lotfi	35	Rezvan Shahr	Gunshot wound	1, 3
20 September	Minoo Majidi	62	Kermanshah	The mother of three was shot by Basijis. A photo of her youngest daughter with her hair shaved and no hijab at her grave was widely shared on social media.	1, 3,
20 September	Diako Mehrnavaei		Bukan		6
20 September	Nika Shakarami	16/17	Tehran	Standing on top of a dumpster at the head of a student protest downtown, she burned her hijab, was chased by Basijis, disappeared without a trace and was handed over dead to her family nine days later. She allegedly fell from an unoccupied house; however, according to an autopsy, she suffered many broken bones from severe beatings. According to witnesses, she was interrogated by the IRGC and then taken to Evin prison.	1-5,
20 September	Reza Shahparnia	20	Kermanshah	Gunshot wound	1, 3
20 September	Abdolsamad Sabeti Zadeh (Shahu Zahie)		Zahedan		2
20 September	Milad Zare	25	Babol		1, 3,
21 September	Matin Abdollahpour	16	Balo, Urmia		3
21 September	Fereydoun Ahmadi		Saqqez		
21 September	Roshana Ahmadi		Bukan	Gunshot wound	1, 6
21 September	Mehdi Babr-Nejad		Quchan	Gunshot wound	1, 6
21 September	Amir Hossein Basati	15	Kermanshah	Targeted close-range shots with metal balls killed him directly.	1, 4, 5,
21 September	Amir Bastami		Kermanshah		6
21 September	Ghazaleh Chalavi	32/33	Amol	Gunshot wound	1, 3,
21 September	Abdolfazl Akbari Doust		Langroud	Gunshot wound	1, 6
21 September	Mehdi Mohammad Fallah	33	Amol	Gunshot wound	1, 3
21 September	Mohammad Farmani		Shahr-e-Ray		6
21 September	Alireza Fathi		Sanfar	Gunshot wound	1, 6
21 September	Amir Ali Fouladi	16	Eslamabad-e Gharb	Gunshot wound	1, 3, 4, 5
21 September	Mohsen Geysari	32	Ilam	Gunshot wound	1, 3
21 September	Mehrdad Ghorbani		Zanjan	Gunshot wound	1, 6
21 September	Milan Haghighi	21	Oshnavieh	Gunshot wound	1, 3,
21 September	Saeed Iranmensh		Kerman		6
21 September	Yasin Jamalzadeh	~28	Rezvan Shahr	Gunshot wound	1, 3
21 September	Erfan Khazaee		Shahriar		6
21 September	Hannaneh Kia	22 / 23	Nowshahr	Gunshot wound	1, 3,
21 September	Mohsen Mohammadi Kochsaraei / Kochaksarai		Qaem Shahr	Gunshot wound	1, 6
21 September	Behnam Layeghpour	37	Rasht	Targeted close shots in the heart	1, 3,
21 September	Sadreddin Litani	27	Oshnavieh	Gunshot wound	1, 3
21 September	Amir Hossein Mahdavi		Rasht		6
21 September	Abdollah Mahmoudpour / Mohammadpour	16-18	Balo, Urmia	He was shot from behind while retreating from a Basij office.	1, 3, 4,
21 September	Mohsen Mal Mir		Nowshahr	Gunshot wound	1, 6
21 September	Amin Maroufi / M'arefat	16	Oshnavieh	Shot by IRGC	1, 3, 4, 5,
21 September	Abdolfazl Mehdipour		Babol	Gunshot wound	1, 6
21 September	Seyyed Abbas Mirmousa / Mir-Mousavi		Langroud	Gunshot wound	1, 6
21 September	Mahsa Mogouei	18	Fulad Shahr	Gunshot wound	1, 3
21 September	Amir Mehdi Malak Mohammadi		Tehran		6
21 September	Iman Mohammadi		Islamabad-e Gharb / Kermanshah		1, 3
21 September	Saeid Mohammadi	21	Islamabad-e-gharb	Gunshot wound	1, 3
21 September	Seyed Mehdi Mousavi	15-16	Zanjan	Was shot from behind and then beaten up.	5,
21 September	Seyyed Sina Mousavi		Amol	Gunshot wound	1, 6
21 September	Hadis Najafi	22 / 23	Karaj	She had posted dance and music videos on TikTok and was shot dead at a demonstration in Karaj.	1, 3,
21 September	Mehrab Najafi		Zarrin Shahr		6
21 September	Mahdi Mousavi Nikou	16	Zanjan	Died while being transported to the hospital after being shot in the back and being beaten with clubs to the head and body.	1, 3, 4
21 September	Amir Nowrozi	16	Bandar-e Anzali	Gunshot wound	1, 3, 4
21 September	Arash Pahlavan	27	Machad	Gunshot wound	1, 6
21 September	Danesh Rahnema	25	Balo, Urmia	Gunshot wound	1, 3
21 September	Parza Rezadoust	17	Karaj		1, 3
21 September	Erfan Rezaei	21	Amol	Gunshot wound	1, 3
21 September	Ali Mozaffari Salanghouch	17	Quchan	Gunshot wound	1, 3
21 September	Mohammad Mam Saleh		Sardasht		6
21 September	Mohammed Reza Savari	14	Hashtgerd / Shahr-e Rey, Tehran		1, 3, 4
21 September	Amir Hossein Shams		Nowshahr	Gunshot wound	1, 6
21 September	Pouya Sheida		Urmia		6
21 September	Morteza Soltanian		Esfahan		6
21 September	Mohammad Hassan Torkaman	27	Babol	Gunshot wound	1, 3
21 September	Mehdi Zahedi		Urmia		6
21 September	Mohammad Zamani	16	Tehran		1, 5
21 September	Mohammad Zarei		Qrachak / Sanqar	Gunshot wound	1, 6
22 September	Kanaan Aghaei	18	Karaj	Gunshot wound	1, 6
22 September	Mehrdad Avazpour		Nowshahr	Gunshot wound	1, 6
22 September	Pedram Azarnoush	16	Dehdasht	He was fatally wounded as a spectator by indiscriminate ICRG gunfire into the crowd.	1, 3, 4,
22 September	Mehrdad Behnam-Asl		Kohgiluyeh, Boyer-Ahmad / Dehdasht		1, 3
22 September	Mohammad Reza Eskandari	25	Pakdasht / Alborz		1, 3,
22 September	Sasan Ghorbani	31-32	Rezvanshahr	Shot while helping a wounded protester, beaten in custody, denied medical attention	1, 3,
22 September	Arvin Malamali Golzari		Fuladshahr		6
22 September	Esmail Heydari		Ardabil		6
22 September	Javad Heydari	36	Qazvin	Gunshot wound	1, 3
22 September	Mohammad Hosseinkhah		Mazandaran	Gunshot wound	1, 6
22 September	Yaser Jafari		Ilam		1
22 September	Rouzbeh Khademi	32	Karaj	Gunshot wound	1,
22 September	Shirin Alizadeh Khansari	35	Chalus	Was killed by an aimed shot in the head.	6,
22 September	Mehdi Leylazi		Karaj	Gunshot wound	1
22 September	Mohammad Rasoul Momenizadeh		Rasht	Gunshot wound	1, 6
22 September	Mohsen Pazouki		Pakdascht / Varamin	Gunshot wound	1
22 September	Maziar Salmanian / Soleimanian		Rasht		1, 3
22 September	Mohammad Reza Sarvari	14	Shahr-e Ray	Cerebral hemorrhage as a result of a shot in the back of the head. Original cause of death listed as suicide: this was refuted by the release of his burial certificate.	1, 4,
22 September	Setareh Tajik	17	Tehran	She was beaten with clubs in the face, head and body. Her family was forced to remain silent.	3, 4,
22 September	Mohammad Amin Takoli		Tehran		6
23 September	Ehsan Alibazi	16	Shahr-e-Qods		1, 5
23 September	Sarina Esmailzadeh	16	Gohardasht in Karaj / Mehrshahr	She was beaten to the head with a club. The judiciary claimed that she committed suicide by jumping from the roof of a house. In order to be able to bury the dead woman, her family was not allowed to open the coffin and had to confirm the information given by the authorities under death threats from the IRGC.	1, 4, 5,
23 September	Hamid Fouladvand		Pakdascht		2
23 September	Alireza Hosseini	26	Tehran	Gunshot wound	1
23 September	Seyyedeh Ameneh Vahdat Hosseini		Karaj		1
23 September	Javad Khansari	36	Tehran		1, 6
23 September	Hossein Morovati		Qrachak Varamin	Gunshot wound	1, 6
23 September	Hediyeh Naeimani		Nowshahr	Gunshot wound	1, 6
23 September	Pouya (Ali) Ahmadpour Pasikhani	17	Rasht	Gunshot wound	1, 5
23 September	Ahmad Reza Qoliji		Hamedan		6
23 September	Parsa Rezadoust	17	Hashtgerd / Alborz	Gunshot wound	1, 3, 4, 5
23 September	Mohammad Javad Zahedi	16	Sari	Targeted head and neck shots	5,
24 September	Mehdi Asgari	25	Garmsar	Gunshot wound	1, 3, 4
24 September	Mehrzad Avazpour		Nowshahr		4
24 September	Mohammad Hosseinikhah		Sari		4
24 September	Hossein Ali Kia Kanjouri	23	Nowshahr	Gunshot wound	1, 3, 4
24 September	Mahmoud Keshvari		Karaj		1
24 September	Lina Namour		Tehran		6
24 September	Morteza Nowroozi		Langaroud	Gunshot wound	1, 3
24 September	Reza Saed		Tehran		6
24 September	Mohammad Hossein Sarvi / Savari-Rad		Garmsar / Tehran		1, 3
25 September	Mohammad Jameh Bozorg		Marlik Karaj	Gunshot wound	1
25 September	Hamin Foulavand		Varamin		1
25 September	Nader Kokar		Rudsar		6
25 September	Siavash Mahmoudi	16	Naziabad, Tehran	Headshot	1, 3, 4, 5,
25 September	Milad Ostad-Hashem	37	Tehran	Milad was shot as he rode a motorbike after taking part in protests in the capital. His parents alleged security forces pressured them to go along with state media reports that he was a Basij member killed by "rioters" and that security forces threatened to kill their two other sons and bury Milad's body secretly in a remote place if they did not co-operate.	
26 September	Abdolsalam Ghader Galvani / Abdussalam Qadir Galvan	32	Oshnavieh		1, 2
28 September	Samad Barginia		Piranshahr	Gunshot wound	1, 6
28 September	Amir Mehdi Farkhipour / Farrokhipour	17	Tehran, Keshavarz Boulevard	He was shot with metal bullets and live ammunition. His father had to name a car accident as the cause; otherwise his daughters will be murdered.	1, 3, 4, 5,
28 September	Amir Reza Naderzadeh		Nowshahr		6
29 September	Erfan Nazarbeigi		Tehran		1, 2
30 September	Esmail Abil		Zahedan		2
30 September	Ali Agheli (Narui)	28	Zahedan		2, 3
30 September	Mukhtar Ahmadi		Marivan		2
30 September	Lal Mohammad Alizehi		Zahedan		2, 3
30 September	Abu Bakr Ali-Zehei		Zahedan		2, 3
30 September	Balal Anshini		Zahedan		2, 3
30 September	Lal Mohammad Anshini		Zahedan		2, 3
30 September	Mehdi Anshini		Zahedan		2
30 September	Musa Anshini		Zahedan		2
30 September	Ali Aqli (Naroui)		Zahedan		2
30 September	Suleiman Arab		Zahedan		2
30 September	Amin Goleh Bacheh		Zahedan		2
30 September	Amin (Badr al-Uloum Seminary)		Zahedan		2
30 September	Riassat (Badel) Balouch		Zahedan		2
30 September	Abdorrahman Balouchi		Zahedan		2
30 September	Abdolrahman Baluchikhah		Zahedan		2, 3
30 September	Ali Barahouie	14	Zahedan	During Friday prayers in Mossala Mosque, he was shot in the neck and chest.	2, 3, 4,
30 September	Abdol Samad Barahui (Aidouzehi)		Zahedan		2
30 September	Ali Akbar Barahui		Zahedan		2
30 September	Mahmoud Barahui		Zahedan		2
30 September	Mohammad Barahui		Zahedan		2
30 September	Zacharie Barahui		Zahedan		2
30 September	Mustafa Barichi	24	Zahedan		2
30 September	(Lal) Mahmoud / Mohammad Brahoui	18	Zahedan		1, 2, 3
30 September	Abdulghafoor Dahmarde / Abdol Ghafoor Dehmordeh		Zahedan		2
30 September	Mansour Dehmardeh		Zahedan		2
30 September	Musa Doveira		Zahedan		2
30 September	Mohammad Farough-Rakhsh		Zahedan		2, 3
30 September	Mohammad Ali Gamshad-Zehei	18	Zahedan		2, 3
30 September	Mohammad Amin Gamshad-Zehei	17	Zahedan	On the way home from Friday prayers, he was shot in the heart.	2, 3, 4
30 September	Mohsen Gamshadzehei		Zahedan		2, 3
30 September	Vahed Gamshadzehi		Zahedan		2
30 September	Salahuddin Gamshad-Zehei		Zahedan		2, 3
30 September	Saeed Gergige		Zahedan		2
30 September	Aminollah Ghaljaei		Zahedan		2, 3
30 September	Mohammad Ghaljei		Zahedan		2, 3
30 September	Matin Ghanbarzehi	13-14	Zahedan		4
30 September	Ibrahim Gorgij		Zahedan		2, 3
30 September	Matine Qanbar Zehi Gorgij		Zahedan		2
30 September	Amir Mohammad Gumshadzehi		Zahedan		2
30 September	Ali Akbar Halgheh-Begoosh		Zahedan		2, 3
30 September	Omran Hassanzehei		Zahedan		2, 3
30 September	Vahid Hovat / Hout		Zahedan		2, 3
30 September	Hamid Isa-Zehei		Zahedan		2, 3
30 September	Azizollah Kabdani		Zahedan		2
30 September	Nematollah Kabedani / Kubdani		Zahedan		2, 3
30 September	Azizullah Kubdani		Zahedan		2
30 September	Sodeys / Sedis Keshani	14	Zahedan	After Friday prayers, the police shot him in the head and heart in front of the police station opposite the Grand Mosque.	1, 2, 3, 5
30 September	Mirshekar(i) / Mireshkar	2	Zahedan		2, 4, 5
30 September	Jalil Mohammad-Zehei		Zahedan		2, 3
30 September	Abubakr Nahtani		Zahedan		2
30 September	Musa Nahtani		Zahedan		2
30 September	Abdol Majid Naroui		Zahedan		2
30 September	Hamid Narouei		Zahedan		2, 3
30 September	Hamzeh Narouei		Zahedan		2, 3
30 September	Mohammad Sediq / Sadigh Narouei		Zahedan		2, 3
30 September	Younes Narouei		Zahedan		2, 3
30 September	Abdollah Naroui		Zahedan		2
30 September	Rafi Naroui	23	Zahedan		2, 3
30 September	Hasti Narui		Zahedan		6
30 September	Musa Dovira Narui	18	Zahedan		2
30 September	Abdol Vahid Tohid Nia		Zahedan	Gunshot wound	1, 2
30 September	Abdulghafoor Noor-Barahui		Zahedan		2, 3
30 September	Javad Pousheh	11/12	Zahedan	After Friday prayers in the Mosalla Mosque, he received several shots in the head outside a police station.	1, 3, 4, 5
30 September	Aminullah Qoljai		Zahedan		2
30 September	Mohammad Qoljaei		Zahedan		2
30 September	Abdolmanan Rakhshani		Zahedan		2
30 September	Balal Rakhshani		Zahedan		2
30 September	Jalil Rakhshani		Zahedan		2
30 September	Mansour Rakhshani		Zahedan		2, 3
30 September	Mohammad Rakhshani	12	Kawsar in Zahedan	He was shot in the head during a police attack on a protest.	3, 4, 5,
30 September	Heydar Narui Rashid		Zahedan		2
30 September	Abdol Majid Rigi		Zahedan		2
30 September	Behzad Rigi	30	Zahedan		2
30 September	Mohammad Rigi		Zahedan		2, 3
30 September	Gungo Zehi Rigi		Zahedan		2
30 September	Amir Hossein Mir Kazehi Riggi	19	Zahedan		2, 3
30 September	Hamid Reza Saneipour		Hamedan	Gunshot wound	1, 2
30 September	Ahmad (Jamma) Sarani (Alizehi)		Zahedan		2
30 September	Omid Sarani	12/13	Zahedan	In an attack on a protest, police shot him in the chest.	2, 3,
30 September	Omid Safarzehi	17	Shirabad in Zahedan	Killed by two shots to the neck.	
30 September	Ahmad Sargolzaei		Zahedan		2, 3
30 September	Abdolmalek Shahbakhsh		Zahedan		2, 3
30 September	Abdullah Shahbakhsh		Zahedan		2
30 September	Ahmad Shahbakhsh		Zahedan		2, 3
30 September	Danial/Daniel Shahbakhsh	11	Zahedan		2
30 September	Farzad Shahbakhsh		Zahedan		2, 3
30 September	Imran Shahbakhsh		Zahedan		2
30 September	Majid Shahbakhsh		Zahedan		2
30 September	Mohiuddin Shahbakhsh		Zahedan		2
30 September	Omran Shahbakhsh		Zahedan		2, 3
30 September	Yaser Shahbakhsh		Zahedan		2, 3
30 September	Abdol Khaleq Shahnavazi		Zahedan		2
30 September	Amir Hamzeh Shahnavazi		Zahedan		2, 3
30 September	Mahmoud Shahnavazi		Zahedan		2
30 September	Mohammad Eghbal (Iqbal) Naebzehei Shahnavazi	16	Zahedan		2, 3
30 September	Omar Shahnavazi		Zahedan		2, 3
30 September	Omid Shahnavazi		Zahedan		2
30 September	Thamer Shahnavazi		Zahedan		2
30 September	Yaser Shahouzehi	16	Zahedan	After Friday prayers, he was shot in the head outside a police station.	3, 4, 5
30 September	Samad Shahuzehei / Abdol Samad Thabitizadeh		Zahedan		2, 3
30 September	Jaber Shirouzi / Shiroozehi	12	Shirabad in Zahedan	Headshot	1, 2, 3, 4
30 September	Najm al-Din Tajik		Zahedan		2
30 September	Najmuddin Tajik		Zahedan		2
30 September	Abdul Wahid Tohidnia		Zahedan		2
30 September	Mohammad Reza Adib Toutazehi		Zahedan		2, 3
30 September	Esmail Hossein Zahi		Zahedan		2
30 September	Majid Baloch Zehi (Sheh Bakhsh)		Zahedan		2
30 September	Mohammad Ali Esmail Zehi (Shah Bakhsh)		Zahedan		2
30 September	Samer (Sami) Hashem Zehie	16	Zahedan	He was shot dead outside a police station after Friday prayers; his family was threatened.	1, 2, 3, 4, 5,
30 September	Mohammad Eqbal Naib Zehi		Zahedan		2, 3
30 September	Gholam Nabi Noti Zehi		Zahedan		2
30 September	Abdol Jalil Qanbar Zehi		Zahedan		2
30 September	Khalil Qanbar Zehi		Zahedan		2
1 October	Mokhtar Ahmadi		Marivan		2
1 October	Ali Bani Assad		Ahvaz		2, 6
1 October	Khodanour Laje’i		Zahedan		2, 6
1 October	Ehsan Khan Mohammadi		Tehran		2, 6
1 October	Pouya Rajab Nia		Babol		2
1 October	Mehrab Dolat Panah		Talesh	Gunshot wound	1, 2
2 October	Jamal Abdol Naser Mohammad Hasani Barahui		Zahedan		2, 6
2 October	Saamer Hashemzehie		Zahedan		2, 6
2 October	Arman Hassanzani / Hasan Zaee		Zahedan		2, 6
2 October	Mahmoud Hassanzani / Hasan Zaee		Zahedan		2, 6
2 October	Morteza Hassanzani / Hasan Zaee		Zahedan		2, 6
2 October	Zolfaghar Jan Hassanzani / Zolfaqar Hasan Zaee		Zahedan		2, 6
2 October	Khodanur Lajai		Zahedan		2
2 October	Salman Maleki	25	Zahedan	Gunshot wound	1, 2
2 October	Ali Akbar Rabi’i		Isfahan		2, 6
2 October	Mahuddin Shirouzehi / Maheddin Shiro Zehi		Karimabad, Zahedan		2, 6
3 October	Mohammad Mehrdadi		Tehran		2, 6
3 October	Mostafa Beriji		Zahedan		2, 6
3 October	Abdolghader Pahlavan	25	Zahedan	Gunshot wound	2, 6
5 October	Nima Shafagh Doust / Nemia Shafiqdoust	16	Salmas / Urmia	He died from gunshot wounds from metal bullets aimed at him. His family had to keep this secret and was threatened.	1, 2, 4, 5, 6,
6 October	Reza Bonyadi		Tehran		2, 6
6 October	Emad Heydari	31	Ahvaz	Beatings in custody	1, 2, 6
8 October	Abolfazi Adinehzadeh / Abdulfazi Adina	16	Mashhad		5,
8 October	Daryoush Alizadeh		Sanandaj		2, 6
8 October	Mohammad Amini		Sanandaj		2, 6
8 October	Maryam Ghavasi		Mashhad		6
8 October	Sajjad Jafari		Shiraz		6
8 October	Ainaz Javaheri		Kermanshah		6
8 October	Simeh Mahmoudinejad		Kerman		6
8 October	Peyman Manbari	29	Sanandaj		2, 6
8 October	Mohsen Mousavi	30	Tehran		2, 6
8 October	Yahya Rahimi	31	Sanandaj	Targeted close-up because the driver had honked for the protests	2, 6,
8 October	Nagin Salehi		Tehran		6
8 October	Kamran Shahbazi		Tehran		6
8 October	Sopher Sharifi		Tehran		2, 6
9 October	Nadia Arefani		Fardis in Karaj	Succumbed to serious injuries during a demonstration the previous day	2, 6
9 October	Aref Ashouri		Rasht, Lakan-Prison		6
9 October	Mehrzad Behrouz		Rasht, Lakan-Prison		6
9 October	Milad Derakhshan		Rasht, Lakan-Prison		6
9 October	Esmail Dezvar		Saqqez		2
9 October	Arian Moridi		Salas-e Babajani		1, 2
9 October	Mohammad Anoush Niya		Rasht, Lakan-Prison		6
9 October	Mehran Rajabi		Rasht, Lakan-Prison		6
9 October	Seyyed Ahmad Shokrollahi		Isfahan		2, 6
10 October	Abolfazl Adinezadeh		Mashhad		2, 6
10 October	Farzin Farrokhi		Saqqez		2, 6
10 October	Omid Mahdavi		Tehran		2, 6
10 October	Elaheh Sa’idi		Saqqez		2, 6
12 October	Kamal Fegghi / Feqhi		Bukan		2, 6
12 October	Asra Panahi Jangah	15/16	Ardabil	She was beaten to death by Basij because she didn't want to sing along to a propaganda song	2, 6,
12 October	Aziz Moradi		Sanandaj		2, 6
12 October	Sina Naderi	22	Kermanshah		2, 6
12 October	Armin Sayadi	18	Kermanshah		2, 6
12 October	Mehrgan Zahmatkesh		Rasht		2, 6
13 October	Negin Abdolmaleki	21	Hamedan		6,
13 October	Parisa Asgari		Tehran		2
13 October	Reza Esmailzadeh		Tehran		6
15 October	Ali Basaki		Tehran		6
15 October	Seyyed Farhad Hosseini		Tehran, Evin prison	Evin prison fire	6
15 October	Hossein Jezi		Tehran, Evin prison	Evin prison fire	2, 6
15 October	Hamid Saeed Mozafari		Tehran, Evin prison	Evin prison fire	2, 6
16 October	Hossein Akbarzadeh		Tehran, Evin prison	Evin prison fire	6
16 October	Atika Gaem Magham	17	Tehran		
17 October	Mohammad Abdollahi		Ilam		2, 6
17 October	Hamed Baji Zehi / Zahi (Brahoui)		Zahedan		2, 6
19 October	Ali Bani Asadi	20	Ahvaz		2
20 October	Ali Jalili		Tehran		6
20 October	Ramin Karami		Kermanshah		2, 6
Until 22 October	Abolfazl Bahu		Qaimshahr		6
Until 22 October	Mehdi Farahani		Khorramshahr		6
Until 22 October	Seyyed Mohammad Hosseini		Saqqez		2, 6
Until 22 October	Maisam Jafari				6
Until 22 October	Rahim Kalij		Qaimshahr		6
Until 22 October	Poriya Kayani		Shushtar		2, 6
Until 22 October	Mohammad Khawajui		Dezful		6
Until 22 October	Sina Malayeri		Arak		2, 6
Until 22 October	Farid Maleki		Tehran		2, 6
Until 22 October	Arnica Kaem Maqami	17	Tehran		6,
Until 22 October	Messam Moghadasi		Tehran		2, 6
Until 22 October	Milad Javidpour Mogoie				6
Until 22 October	Ezzatollah Shahbazi		Tehran, Evin prison		6
Until 22 October	Sarina Shiri		Kermanshah		6
23 October	Ramin Fatehi		Sanandaj		2, 6
23 October	Ehsan Khawajui		Dezful		6
23 October	Nahid Mostafapour		Yasouj		6
23 October	Mona Naghib	8	Saravan		
24 October	Sadaf Movahedi	17	Tehran		6,
25 October	Parisa Bahmani		Tehran		6,
25 October	Parmis Hamnava	14	Iranshahr		6,
25 October	Ebrahim Mirzaei	42	Sanandaj		6,
25 October	Marzieh Doshman Ziyari		Bushehr		6
26 October	Behnaz Afshari		Tehran, Evin prison	Evin prison fire	6
26 October	Afshin Asham	28	Qasr-e Shirin		
26 October	Rasoul Haddadi		Zanjan		6
26 October	Hadi Haqshenas		Isfahan		6
26 October	Mohammad Lotfollahi		Sanandaj	IRGC seriously injured him, transported him to an unknown location and handed him over dead to his family the following day. The dead man had severe neck wounds, possibly from torture.	6,
26 October	Hamid Reza Malmir		Karaj		6
26 October	Ismail Mauludi / Esmail Moloudi	35	Mahabad		
26 October	Amirhossein Rumiani Nazari		Tehran		6
26 October	Ali Rouzbahani		Tehran		6
26 October	Sarina Saedi	16/17	Sanandaj	She received severe blows to the head and died the following day.	6,
26 October	Seyed Ali Seiedi		Tehran		6
26 October	Mohammad Shariati		Sanandaj		
27 October	Ermita Abbasi	20	Karaj		
27 October	Zaniar Aboubekri / Abu Bakri		Mahabad		6,
27 October	Fereshteh Ahmadi	32	Mahabad	When the mother of two tried to protect two young men from attacks by the military, they shot her.	6,
27 October	Keyvan Darvishi	18	Sanandaj		
27 October	Fereydon Faraji		Baneh	He was hit and killed by IRGC gunfire in the crowd.	6,
27 October	Shahou Khezri		Mahabad	He was shot in the head while trying to help guide fellow protestors to safety	6,
27 October	Motalleb Saeed Pirou / Matlab Saeed Peyrow / Peyro		Baneh	He was hit by shots fired into the crowd by the IRGC.	6,
27 October	Mehrshad Shahidi	19	Arak		6,
27 October	Kobra Sheikheh / Sheikh Saqqa		Mahabad		6,
28 October	Dastan Rasul Mohammad Agha		Baneh		6,
28 October	Masoud Ahmadzadeh		Mahabad		6,
28 October	Ali Fazeli		Amol		6
28 October	Kabdani, son of Khodabakhsh	12	Zahedan		6
28 October	Adel Kochakzaei		Zahedan		6
28 October	Farid Koravand		Asaluyeh		6
28 October	Omid Narouie		Zahedan		6
28 October	Amir Shahnavazi		Zahedan		6
29 October	Aref Gholampour		Zahedan		6
29 October	Saman Qadirpour		Tehran		6
29 October	Diana Mahmoudi	8	Piranshahr		6
31 October	Kumar Daroftadeh	16	Piranshahr	Purposefully shot	6,
31 October	Jafar Qurbani		Kamyaran		6
31 October	Moulavi Youssef Raisi		Lashar		6
31 October	Mohammad Saremi		Borujerd		6
1 November	Mohammad Hossein Faraji		Tehran		6
1 November	Nasim Sedghi	22	Urmia	shot	2, 6
2 November	Momen Zand Karimi	18	Sanandaj	He was shot dead at a funeral for Hadis Najafi.	6,
2 November	Milad Khavari		Bandar Abbas		6
2 November	Morteza Shirmohammadi		Shahin Dez		6
3 November	Shoaib Darghale		Chabahar		6
3 November	Mehdi Hazrati		Karaj		6
3 November	Mehdis Hosseini		Amol		6
3 November	Mohammadreza Bali Lashak		Nowshahr		6
3 November	Prasto Mouradkhani		Karaj		6
3 November	Yaser Naroi		Zahedan		6
3 November	Mohammad Reza Sarvi		Shahr-e Rey		6
3 November	Mehran Shekari		Karaj		6
3 November	Erfan Zamani		Lahijan	Shot and bled to death because the perpetrators prevented first aid. Police actions prevented a vigil a few days later.	6,
4 November	Shahli Bar		Khash		6
4 November	Sohn von Haj Khoda Murad Brahoi		Khash		6
4 November	Sadegh Brahui		Khash		6
4 November	Mohammad Amin Heshmatian		Karaj		6
4 November	Ali Kurd Kalahori		Khash		6
4 November	Mobin Mirkazehi		Khash		6
4 November	Nima Nouri	17	Karaj	The teenager was purposefully shot. This gave rise to new protest calls.	
4 November	Kambiz Regi		Khash		6
4 November	Sohn von Anwar Salahshuran		Khash		6
4 November	Mohammad Selahshuran		Khash		6
4 November	Mohammad Shahbakhsh		Khash		6
4 November	Yunus Shahbakhsh		Khash		6
4 November	Rahim Dad Shahli		Khash		6
4 November	Abdul Malik Shahnawazi		Kash		6
4 November	Azim Mahmoud Zahi		Khash		6
4 November	Murad Zahi		Khash		6
4 November	Saeed Sohrab Zehi		Khash		6
4 November	Yasir Bahadur Zehi		Khash		6
5 November	Maria Gavasieh		Shiraz		6
5 November	Pegah Gavasieh		Shiraz		6
5 November	Nasrin Ghaderi	35	Marivan	The Kurdish doctoral student was shot in the head several times during a protest, fell into a coma and died in a hospital. Her family was not allowed to bury her in Marivan. The Secret Service ordered a funeral without anyone present.	6,
5 November	Mozhgan Kadkhodaei		Tehran		6
5 November	Abbas Louiemi		Ahvaz		6
5 November	Mohammad Hossein Salari		Mahshahr		6
6 November	Mohammad Ghaemi Far Asterki		Dezful		6
6 November	Oveis Shekarze’i		Sarbaz		6
7 November	Sina Firouzabadi		Shiraz		6
7 November	Zia Mir Baloch Zehi		Saravan		6
8 November	Komeil Amir Khanlou		Karaj		6
8 November	Mohammad Reza (Hessam)		Tehran		6
9 November	Sepehr Biranvand		Khorramabad		6
9 November	Alireza Karimi	20	Arak	Beaten to death with police batons during student protests	6,
9 November	Matin Nasri		Sanandaj		6
9 November	Faieq Mom Qadri		Mahabad		6
9 November	Hemin Hamzeh	30	Sardasht	Killed by border guards in the village of Boyuran	
15 November	Daniel/Daniyal Pabandi	17	Saqqez	Gunshot in stomach. His body was stolen by government agents after his death and buried without his family's approval.	
16 November	Kian Pirfalak	9	Izeh		
16 November	Artin Rahmani Piyani	17	Izeh		
16 November	Aylar Haghi	23	Tabriz	Haghi participated in the anti-government protest that took place in Tabriz on November 16, 2022, as part of the 2022 Iran protests. Government forces began to disperse the demonstration by using violence against the demonstrators. After the intervention of the police, Haghi took refuge in a building to escape the violence. Several officers who were chasing her followed her into the building and shot her in the back of the head, killing her. Her body was then thrown from a high-rise building.	
dateless	Saeid Iranmanesh		Kerman	Gunshot wound	1
dateless	Omid Safarzahi	17			1, 5
dateless	Afshin Shahamat	16	Tehran	Gunshot wound	1
dateless	Jabir Shirouzahi	12			5
23 November 2023	Milad Zohrevand	21	Hamedan	Charge of murdering a member of the Islamic Revolutionary Guard Corps named "Ali Nazari"	

== See also ==
- Death sentences during the Mahsa Amini protests
- Political repression in the Islamic Republic of Iran
- Deaths during the 2025–2026 Iranian protests
