= Yashar Tohidi =

Iranian political prisoner and student

Yashar Tohidi یاشار توحیدی
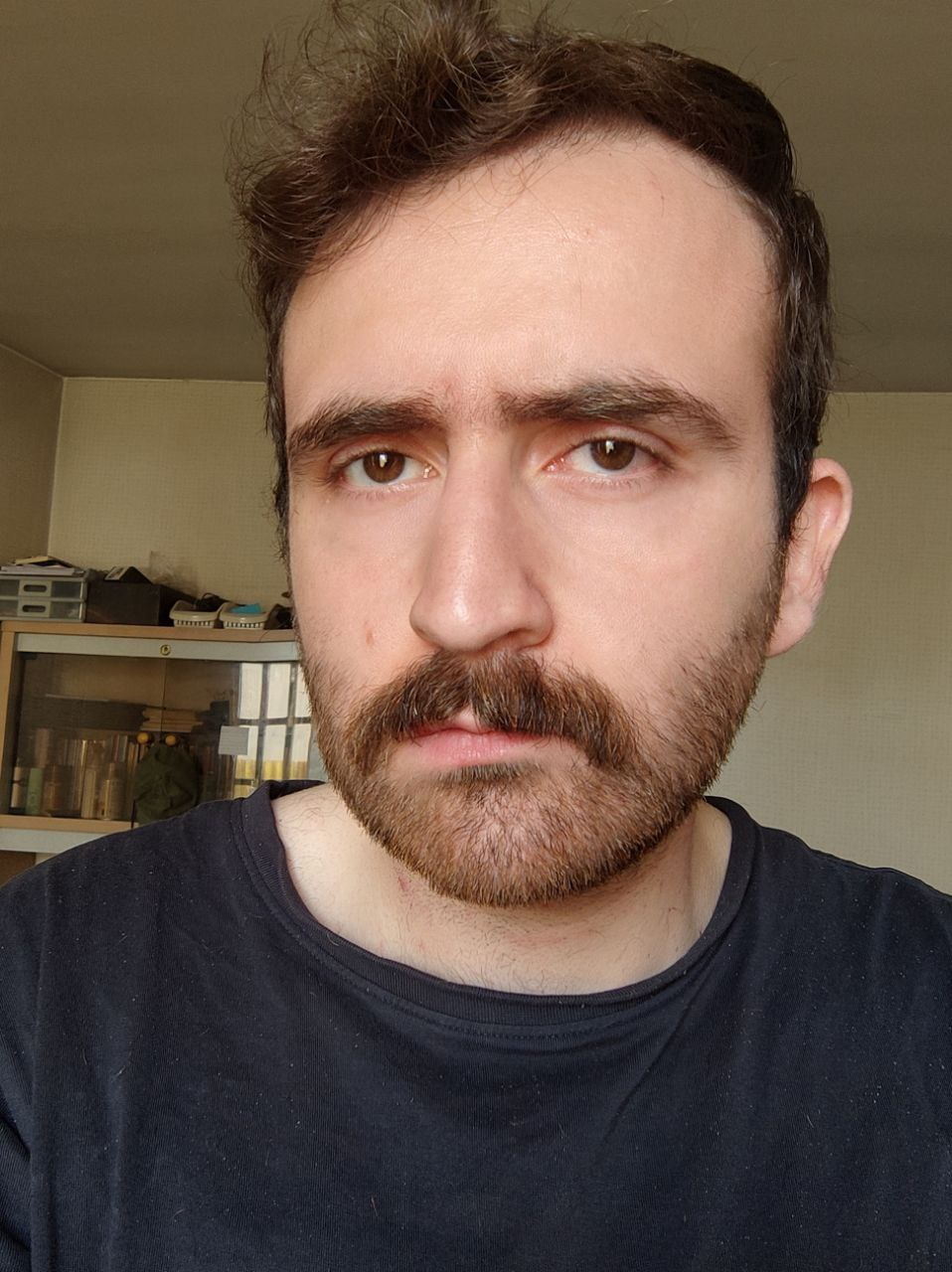
- A photo of Tohidi at 24
- Occupation: Student
- Known for: Political Prisoner, Activist

Yashar Tohidi (Persian: یاشار توحیدی) is an Iranian student and political prisoner.

During the Evin Prison fire incident he sustained severe gunshot wounds, but remains in prison and has been denied proper medical care despite the deterioration of his physical conditions.

== Activism and sentence ==
Yashar Tohidi is a student of Aerospace engineering at the Islamic Azad University.

Due to his political activism, Tohidi was first arrested in January 2016 and released after a short period of time. He was arrested again in June 2017 and this time was released on bail after one month of detention. He was arrested again in July 2021 and was transferred to Ward 2 of Evin Prison (under the control of IRGC) and was released on bail after 12 days of interrogation.

In early 2022 the Islamic Revolutionary Court sentenced him to three years and five months in prison on charges of “acting against national security through membership in one of the Marxist groups” and “propaganda against the state”, of which the severest punishment of two years and nine months on the charge of “acting against national security through membership in a Marxist group” was enforceable per Article 134 of the Islamic Penal Code.

In June 2022, he surrendered to Evin prison to begin his sentence.

== Evin Prison fire ==
During the Evin Prison fire incident on October 15, 2022, amidst the Mahsa Amini protests, Tohidi took 3 gunshots to his thighs when the state agents opened fire on prisoners. According to resources both of his legs were severely injured due to live ammunition. He did not immediately receive medical care. Finally after two weeks he was taken to a hospital where he received surgery and the bullet heads and pellets were removed from his thigh.

Tohidi remains in critical condition in Ward 8 of Evin Prison. According to HRANA (Human Rights Activists News Agency) his leg nerves are severely inflamed and he almost passes out from the pain. On several occasions he has been taken to the prison clinic on a stretcher, given painkillers and returned to the ward. It is possible that he may lose one of his legs due to lack of medical attention. The infection has reached the main nerve of his leg but prison authorities refuse to send him to a hospital or release him on medical furlough.

== See also ==
- Evin Prison fire
- Mahsa Amini protests
- Human rights in the Islamic Republic of Iran
