= Killing of Kian Pirfalak =

2022 killing of child by security forces in Izeh, Iran

Kian Pirfalak
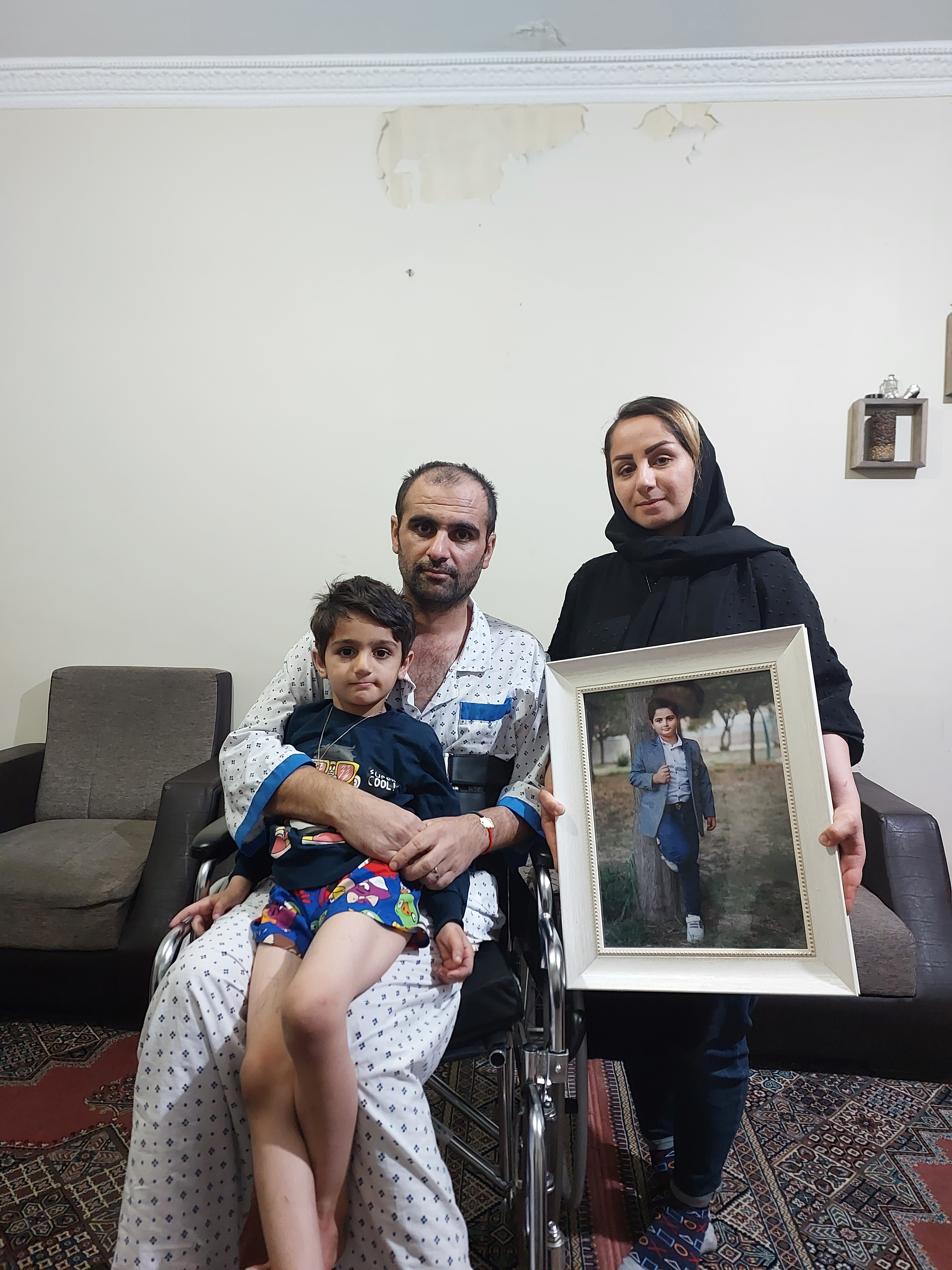
- The Pirfalik family holding a portrait of Kian
- Born: 11 June 2013
- Died: 16 November 2022 (aged 9); Izeh, Khuzestan, Iran
- Cause of death: Shooting by security forces of the Islamic Republic of Iran
- Resting place: Parchestan-e Gurui, Central District, Izeh County
- Known for: One of the youngest victims of the crackdown on the Mahsa Amini protests

Kian Pirfalak (Iranian Persian: کیان پیرفلک, romanized: Kiân Pirfalak; 11 June 2013 – 16 November 2022) was an Iranian nine-year-old boy who was killed in Izeh during the crackdown on the Mahsa Amini protests. He was shot by government security forces while sitting in his parents' vehicle during the attack on Izeh market. His father, Meysam Pirfalak, was critically injured in the assault and was hospitalized.

Pirfalak's mother and other family members who witnessed the incident blame the attack on Iranian security forces. Islamic Republic news agencies, including IRNA, initially blamed Pirfalak's death on ISIS terrorists, circulating a statement attributed to the group claiming responsibility for the shooting. BBC Monitoring, however, investigated the statement and concluded that it was fake.

Pirfalak's death sparked nationwide outrage against the government and its use of extreme lethal force against protestors. He is thought to be the youngest victim of the government suppression of protests in the wake of the death of Mahsa Amini.

In 2023, the Supreme Court of the Islamic Republic of Iran issued a death sentence for Abbas Mujahed Kurkur after he was tortured in prison and they obtained a forced confession.

== Incident ==
On 16 November 2022, during the crackdown on the Mahsa Amini protests in the city of Izeh, there was an armed attack on Izeh market by government security forces. Nine-year-old Kian Pirfalak, who was sitting in his parents' vehicle, was shot by government security forces during the attack. His father, Meysam Pirfalak, was also critically injured in the assault and was hospitalized. Kian Pirfalak was among the seven people who died during the attack, as were two teenagers, Artin Rahmani and Sepehr Maghsoodi (who was shot in the head).

== Attribution of blame ==
Pirfalak's mother and other family members who witnessed the incident blame the attack on Iranian security forces. A relative of Pirfalak told Radio Farda that security agents had opened fire on the car where Pirfalak was sitting. A bullet had gone through Pirfalak's lung. His father was also seriously injured and was later hospitalized. His mother, Zeinab Moulai denies the government's account of events, and said her son was killed by security forces.

The Islamic Republic News Agency (IRNA), Fars News Agency and other Iranian news outlets initially attributed the killings to ISIS terrorists rather than the state's security forces. They circulated a statement purportedly from the terrorist group claiming responsibility for the shooting. An investigation by BBC Monitoring concluded that the statement was fake.

Iranian authorities then attributed the deaths of Pirfalak and others to four men: Bahman Bahmani, Hossein Saeedi, Mahmoud Ahmadi, and Abbas Mujahed Kurkur. Two of the men were killed in an attack by IRGC forces, while Kurkur was later tortured to obtain a forced confession and was sentenced to death.

== Funeral ==
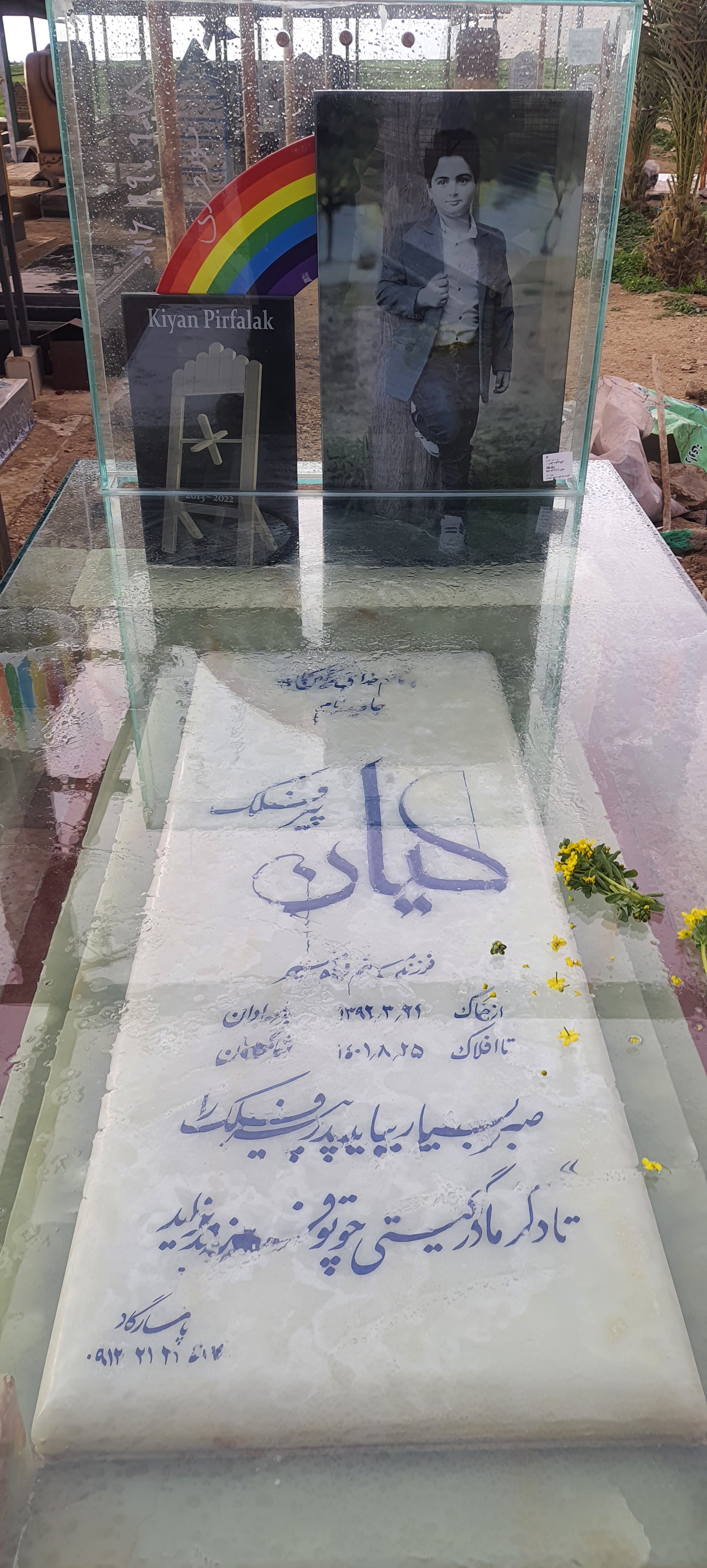
Kian Pirfalak's grave

Pirfalak's family placed his body on ice, refusing to keep it at the morgue due to the fear of security forces stealing the child's body, as that has happened in many cases. Hundreds of people gathered at Pirfalak's funeral and chanted anti-regime slogans in protest of his death.

"Hear it from me about how the shooting happened so they can't say it was by terrorists, because they're lying," Pirfalak's mother Zeinab Molaie told mourners at his funeral. During the ceremony, Pirfalak's mother criticized the Islamic Republic's Supreme Leader Ali Khamenei through a poem, which read: "How's Mister Seyyed Ali [Khamenei] doing? He has a long beard coming down to his chest! A chest full of hatred - his heart is like stone - all he says is nonsense!"

== Impact ==
Pirfalak's death sparked an increase in nationwide protests, and international support. After Pirfalak's funeral, Ruhollah Khomeini's childhood home was set on fire on 17 November 2022; which is being used as a commemorative museum and located in the city of Khomeyn. Protests at the University of Tehran's Faculty of Psychology and Educational Sciences displayed photos of Pirfalak.

Days after Pirfalak's death, UNICEF issued a statement condemning the death and detention of children in the wake of the 2022 protests in Iran.

A viral video circulated online of young Pirfalak testing his hand-made boat, and he stated, "in the name of the God of rainbows." The stanza "In the Name of the Lord of the Rainbow" is a poem by Mahmoud Purohab (Persian: محمود پورهاب) which is included in Persian 3rd grade elementary school book. As a result, many memorials about Pirfalak have referenced the God of rainbows.

Pouya Molaeirad, a relative of Kian Pirfalak's mother, was shot and killed by Iranian security agents on 11 June 2023, during a memorial service for Kian. Eyewitnesses and videos shared on social media showed Molaeirad being shot at Pirfalak's burial site in the village of Parchestan, Izeh, amid a heavy security presence. Iranian officials claimed that Molaeirad was an attacker who was shot in self-defense, but his family and social media users disputed this account.

== See also ==
- Deaths during the Mahsa Amini protests
- Iranian protests against compulsory hijab
- Political repression in the Islamic Republic of Iran
