= Killing of Farjad Darvishi =

2022 shooting of Iranian protestor by police

Farjad Darvishi
- فرجاد درویشی
- Died: 19 September 2022 (aged 23); Urmia, Iran
- Cause of death: Shot by police security agents during the demonstration in the wake of the death of Mahsa Amini

Farjad Darvishi (Persian: فرجاد درویشی), a 23-year old Iranian man, was killed on 19 September 2022 by police in the Waliasr town of Urmia, Iran while protesting the death of Mahsa Amini protests.

== Background ==
Darvishi was from the Balo village in Urmia. Darvishi was protesting alongside other Urmian citizens against Iranian leadership in the wake of the death of Mahsa Amini. He was shot by police security agents during the demonstration and died on his way to the hospital from the injuries sustained from the gun shots.

As of 21 September 2022, The Kurdistan Human Rights Organization confirmed his killing as one out of six other protestors' deaths including Mohsen Mohammadi, Fereydoun Mahmoudi, Reza Lotfi, Zakariya Khiyal, Foad Ghadimi, and Minou Majidi to have died during the September 2022 Iranian protests.

== See also ==
- Deaths during the Mahsa Amini protests
- Killing of Hadis Najafi
