= Attack on Izeh market =

Armed attack at a public market in 2022

- Part of Mahsa Amini protests
Date	16 November 2022
Location	Izeh, Khuzestan province, Iran
Result	Violent crackdown on locals and protesters, 7 killed and many injured Suspension of schools

Belligerents
Iranian security forces	Protestors of the Death of Mahsa Amini

Casualties and losses
- 7 killed, 15+ injured

The attack on Izeh market was an armed attack by Iranian security forces at a public market on November 16, 2022, during the Mahsa Amini protests in the city of Izeh, Khuzestan province, Iran. Seven people died during this incident, including a child, Kian Pirfalak; and two teenagers, Artin Rahmani, and Sepehr Maghsoodi (the latter was killed by a bullet in his head). Many of the people killed were of the Bakhtiari tribe, and were not known to be attached to a political position.

The Iranian government declared this incident a terrorist act and claimed that it was carried out by ISIS, a militant Islamist group, but it was later denied.

== See also ==
- 2022 Zahedan massacre
