= Eskan =

Eskan Eskān
- Location in Afghanistan
- Coordinates: 36°38′20″N 70°51′17″E
- Country: Afghanistan
- Province: Badakhshan Province
- District: Jurm
- Time zone: + 4.30

Eskan is a village in Badakhshan Province in north-eastern Afghanistan. It is located in the valley of the Munjan, about 18 miles upstream of Jurm. Around the turn of the 20th century it had been a village of roughly 40 houses.
