= Judiciary Organization of the Armed Forces of the Islamic Republic of Iran =

The Judiciary Organization of the Armed Forces is part of the Iranian judiciary. Composed of prosecutor offices and courts-martial, it is the only specialized judicial authority anticipated in the Constitution of the Islamic Republic of Iran.

== Legal Status ==
According to Principle 172 of the Constitution of the Islamic Republic of Iran, military trials are set up to try crimes relevant to military and disciplinary-specific duties of the members of the army, gendarmerie, Shahrbani (Law Enforcement Force) and the Islamic Revolutionary Guard Corps. However, their public crimes or the crimes they may commit in the capacity of justice officers, are tried in public courts.

== Organizational structure ==
The prosecutor office and courts-martial are parts of the country's judiciary and are therefore subject to its principles.

Military trials comprise courts-martial type 1 and type 2. Courts-martial type 1 adjudicate crimes with heavier punishments in law. In these courts, except for a number of rulings which are definitive by law, other decisions can be re-examined. Rulings of the courts-martial type 1 are contestable and re-examinable in Supreme Court of Iran.

== Scope of Activity ==
Currently, on the basis of the Islamic Consultative Assembly's legislation, Expediency Discernment Council and the Leader's special permission, the Judiciary Organization of the Armed Forces is legitimate to hear the following cases:

- Military and disciplinary-specific crimes, committed by members of the Armed Forces
- Crimes related to the duties of the employees of the Ministry of Intelligence
- Crimes detected while investigating and trying military-specific crimes
- Crimes committed by Iranian prisoners of war and by foreign prisoners of war imprisoned in Iran

== Hierarchy of Activities ==
In the Judiciary Organization of Armed Forces, hearings are done in two stages: upon receiving a report or a lawsuit from the relevant authorities or individuals, a criminal case starts in the military prosecutors office and initial investigation is conducted by interrogators and prosecutors under the auspices of attorney. Provided that there is enough evidence to certify the offence, the case, after the issuance of an indictment, is sent to the court-martial where after a trial an appropriate verdict is issued.

Hearing in courts-martial is carried out according to the criminal procedure and the accused ones can enjoy having lawyers during the entire trial procedure. The Judiciary Organization of the Armed Forces currently has prosecutors office and courts-martial in all the provinces' capitals. These courts are responsible for adjudicating the crimes committed within the jurisdiction of each province.
