= Par Surakh, Izeh =

Par Surakh پرسوراخ
- Village
- Location within Iran
- Coordinates: 31°49′07″N 49°45′55″E
- Country: Iran
- Province: Khuzestan
- County: Izeh
- Bakhsh: Central
- Rural District: Holayjan

Population (2006)
  - Total: 171
- Time zone: UTC+3:30 (IRST)
  - Summer (DST): UTC+4:30 (IRDT)

Par Surakh (Persian: پرسوراخ, also Romanized as Par Sūrākh) is a village in Holayjan Rural District, in the Central District of Izeh County, Khuzestan Province, Iran. At the 2006 census, its population was 171, in 31 families.
