= Abdolvahab Shahidi =

Iranian musician (1922–2021)

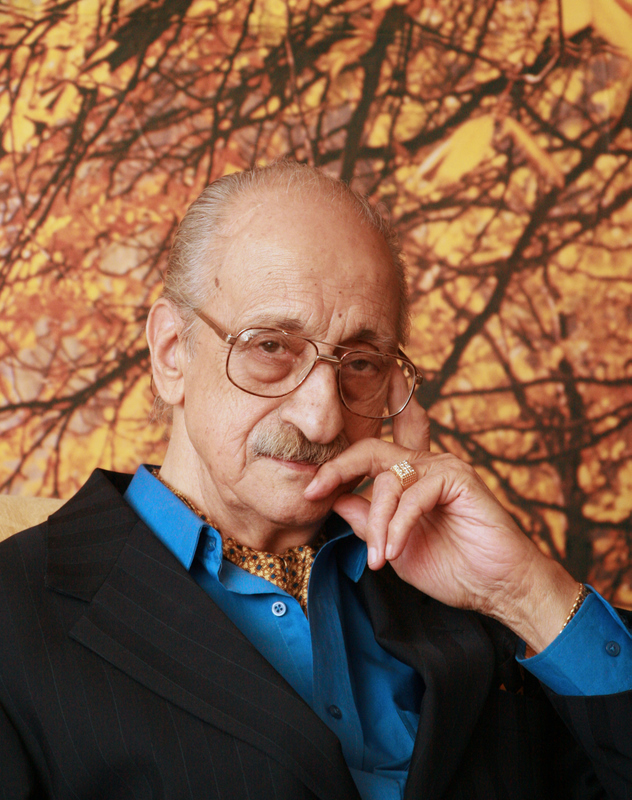

Background information
- Born: 23 September 1922; Meymeh, Isfahan, Iran
- Died: 10 May 2021 (aged 98) Tehran, Iran
- Genre: Persian classical music
- Occupation: Musician
- Years active: 1940–2015

Abdolvahab Shahidi (Persian: عبدالوهاب شهيدی; 23 September 1922 – 10 May 2021) was an Iranian barbat player, singer and composer in the classical style. He is noted as one of the contemporary pioneers of Persian music by BBC Persian.
