= Par Surakh, Bagh-e Malek =

Par Surakh پرسوراخ
- Village
- Location within Iran
- Coordinates: 31°41′28″N 49°49′12″E
- Country: Iran
- Province: Khuzestan
- County: Bagh-e Malek
- Bakhsh: Central
- Rural District: Qaleh Tall

Population (2006)
  - Total: 86
- Time zone: UTC+3:30 (IRST)
  - Summer (DST): UTC+4:30 (IRDT)

Par Surakh (Persian: پرسوراخ, also Romanized as Par Sūrākh; also known as Parreh Sīlā and Parreh Sūrākh) is a village in Qaleh Tall Rural District, in the Central District of Bagh-e Malek County, Khuzestan Province, Iran. At the 2006 census, its population was 86, in 17 families.
