= Killing of Minoo Majidi =

Protester who died during 2022 protests in Iran

Death of Minoo Majidi
- Native name: مینوو مەجیدی
- Date: 20 September 2022
- Location: Kermanshah, Kermanshah province, Iran
- Burial: Mina Abad Cemetery

Minoo Majidi (1960 – 20 September 2022) was a 62-year-old Iranian woman who was killed by Iranian authorities during the September 2022 Iranian protests.

== Life ==
Minoo Majidi was an Iranian woman of Kurdish ethnicity who was born in 1960 in a Yarsan family, in the city of Qasr-e Shirin. She lived in the city of Kermanshah with her husband and three children.

== Death ==
Following the death of Mahsa Amini in the custody of the Morality Police, a wave of anti-regime protests began in Saqqez —Mahsa Amini's place of birth and burial— which quickly spread across Iran and all around the world. Minoo Majidi was one of the protesters on the streets of Kermanshah who was shot and killed by the forces of the Islamic Republic on 20 September 2022.

== Burial ==
Majidi's funeral was held on 22 September 2022 at the Mina Abad Cemetery in Kermanshah and turned into an anti-government demonstration. The women present at the ceremony took off their hijab as a sign of protest and chanted slogans like "Woman, Life, Freedom" and anti-regime slogans.

== Image ==
Days after the burial of Majidi, in which women unveiled and the attendees chanted in protest, a photo of her daughter went viral. In the photo, her daughter stands beside her mother's grave with her bare shaved head, holding her own hair, and staring into the camera in unbending defiance. The Italian Corriere della Sera newspaper published a picture of Majidi's daughter at her mother's grave and called it a new symbol of Iranian women's struggle for freedom.
