= Evin Prison fire =

2022 fire in Evin, Tehran, Iran

- Part of Mahsa Amini protests
- Date: 15 October 2022
- Location: Evin Prison, Evin, Tehran, Iran
- Deaths: At least 8 inmates
- Injuries: 57+

On 15 October 2022, starting around 10:00 local time, a series of incidents including a fire, explosions and automatic gun battles occurred in the Evin Prison in Tehran, Iran, continuing through to early morning 16 October 2022. At least eight inmates died, and 57 others were injured according to Iranian government sources.

== Background ==
Evin prison is located in a residential and commercial area known as Evin, next to the Saadat Abad district. There is a large park area with a popular upscale teahouse and restaurant located immediately next to it. Photography in front of and around the prison is illegal. The prison is known to hold political activists, journalists and those facing security related charges, as well as dual and foreign nationals. It also has a long history of holding political prisoners and those with ties to Western governments that can be used as bargaining chips in international negotiations, and has been charged by human rights groups with abusing inmates.

Mehdi Rafsanjani (son of former Iranian president Akbar Hashemi Rafsanjani), who was on a regular Wednesday-to-Friday furlough from Evin Prison, where he was serving a sentence for financial corruption, was told on Wednesday 12 October not to return to the prison until after Saturday 15 October. On 13 and 14 October 2022, riot police banged their batons on the cell doors of prisoners in Evin Prison and cried "Allahu akbar! (God is great!)".

== Fire ==
Events at the prison on 15 October, prior to the fire, include continuation from the previous days of riot police banging on prison doors, and reactions to the banging by prisoners who called for "the downfall" of Iranian leader Khamenei. Shots and prisoners' calls of "Death to Khamenei" were heard.

Reports on the beginning of the fire and related events vary. According to The New York Times (NYT), three versions include "an explosive device, an attempted escape and an infiltration of the prison from the outside". A witness interviewed by NYT said that she heard gunshots starting at 10:00 local time.

According to the Judiciary Media Center and governor-general of Tehran Mohsen Mansouri, during a fight between a number of prisoners in Ward 6 and Ward 7, both of which are special prisons for financial convictions and theft, the sewing workshop of the prison caught fire. Witnesses interviewed by Al Jazeera English stated that the fire was started by Molotov cocktails thrown into the prison, followed by security forces firing and using tear gas.

According to witnesses interviewed by Reuters, the fighting started between riot police and prisoners in Ward 7, and continued to Ward 8, with riot police using tear gas and firing pellet guns, and prisoners aiming to help each other.

Fars News Agency said that four "massive explosions" took place after IRNA claimed that the fire had been extinguished. A NYT witness said that she heard automatic gunfire and "enormous" explosions around 21:00 local time. According to the Center for Human Rights in Iran, there was a "gun battle" in Evin prison Saturday night ongoing at 22:00 local time on the night of 15 October. Explosions from the prison were heard in the early hours of 16 October. Windows of nearby homes were shattered by the blast waves from the explosions heard around 21:00 local time, according to a NYT witness.

Amirdaryoush Youhaei, a local resident, stated that "There was a massive siren and then eleven big explosions and machine gunfire that didn't stop. ... It felt like we were watching a war movie."

The families of prisoners in Evin and various others gathered near the prison. Government forces threw tear gas at them in response. The security forces also blocked Yadegar-e-Emam Expressway to prevent people from approaching. Anti-government slogans can be heard in videos taken around the prison. Slogans that were called out included "Death to the dictator".

During the events of the evening, official media stated that prisoners had walked through a minefield while trying to escape.

== Casualties ==
Eight prisoners, all of whom had been convicted for robbery-related offences, were killed and 61 others inmates injured. Human rights activist Pouran Nazemi alleged that prison officers had shot prisoners attempting to escape the fire.

== Depiction in media ==
The media affiliated to the Islamic Revolutionary Guard Corps and the government of the Islamic Republic reported the conflict and fire in this prison. Videos shared on social media on 15 October showed smoke rising from the prison. Repeated gunfire as well as anti-government chants could also be heard in the videos.

== See also ==
- Mahsa Amini protests
