= List of foreign nationals detained in Iran =

The Islamic Republic of Iran has, since 1979 and the Iran hostage crisis, engaged in repeated detentions of foreign or dual nationals. These detentions have lasted for extended periods, with a documented history of using the detained party as a bargaining chip in diplomatic negotiations. The list below of current and former detainees in Iran excludes people abducted in other countries and brought into the country.

== Hostage diplomacy ==
Since the Iran hostage crisis, the Islamic Republic of Iran has engaged in a pattern of detaining foreign nationals for extended periods. According to the Center for Human Rights in Iran, the Iranian government has imprisoned dual and foreign-only nationals "as bargaining chips in its dealings with other nations." Iran's repeated dubious detention of dual citizens and thereafter bargaining behavior have led observers to qualify the practice as a policy of hostage diplomacy.

According to French ex-hostage Louis Arnaud, who spent two years in Iranian custody, those detained are usually kept in solitary confinement. In an interview, he said that "Everything is done so that you are deprived of your humanity".

== Detainees ==
Dual nationals of Iran and another country are particularly vulnerable to arbitrary detention because under the international Master Nationality Rule and treaty, "a State may not afford diplomatic protection to one of its nationals against a state whose nationality such person also possesses".

According to Human Rights Watch, "Iranian authorities have violated detainees' due process rights and carried out a pattern of politically motivated arrests." In November 2017, Reuters reported that Iran's Islamic Revolutionary Guard Corps (IRGC) had arrested "at least 30 dual nationals during the past two years, mostly on spying charges."

== Reactions ==
In September 2019, on the sidelines of the Seventy-fourth session of the United Nations General Assembly, families of dual and foreign nationals imprisoned in Iran as well former dual and foreign nationals imprisoned in Iran launched the Alliance Against State Hostage Taking."

In January 2023, France called for the release of seven nationals, who were held in Iran. One of the detainees, Fariba Adelkhak was arrested in June 2019, along with her colleague Roland Marchal. While Marchal was released in 2020, Fraiban Adelkhak remained in prison until 2023.

== Current foreign nationals imprisoned in Iran ==
Name	Detained	Citizenship	Days in detention	Reason for detention	Notes	Ref.
Nazak Afshar	12 March 2016	France, Iran	3906			
Ahmad Reza Jalali	24 April 2016	Sweden, Iran	3863			
Abdolrasoul Dorri-Esfahani	16 August 2016	Canada, Iran	3871	In May 2017, he was convicted on espionage charges, including "collaborating with the British secret service," and sentenced to five years in prison.		
Nahid Taghavi	16 October 2020	Germany	2227			
Mehran Raoof	16 October 2020	UK	2227			
Mohammed-Hassan Amin	20 April 2022	Australia, Iran	1676	After his arrest, he faced numerous charges, mostly consisting of "collaborating with a hostile foreign power." He spent approximately 2 years under interrogation in various solitary confinement locations in Tehran, including 209 solitary in Evin prison. He was convicted to more than 20 years of prison in total. As of mid-December 2025 he is still serving his term in Evin prison.		
Hakop Gochumyan	1 August 2023	Armenia	1208	He was accused of "engaging in deviant proselytising activity that contradicts the sacred law of Islam" and sentenced to 10 years of prison. As of mid-December 2025, he is kept in Evin prison.		
Shahram Namavar	15 August 2023	UK, Iran	1194	As of mid-December 2025, he is kept in Evin prison.		
Reza Valizadeh	15 January 2024	USA, Iran	1041	A former journalist of "Radio Farda", he was accused of "cooperating with the hostile US government" and sentenced to 10 years in prison in January 2025. As of mid-December 2025, he is kept in Evin prison.		
Ahmad Riazi	15 March 2024	UK, Iran	981	He was accused of collaborating with MI6. As of mid-December 2025, he was kept in Evin prison.		
Bastian Brüsecke	15 December 2024	Germany	706	He came to Iran in late 2024 seeking footage for his project about the deserts in the Middle East. He was arrested in Bandar Abbas and accused of "collaborating with a hostile foreign power". Until the beginning of October 2024, he was kept in the Bandar Abbas prison and was sentenced to 3 years of prison under espionage charges. He was then moved to Evin prison in Tehran.		
Sumeet Sud	8 January 2025	India	682	He was arrested during a business trip to Iran and accused of spying for the United States. In November 2025, he was sentenced to 10 years of prison by judge Salavati.		
Craig Foreman	15 January 2025	UK	689	After entering Iran from Armenia in December 2025, Craig and Lindsey Foreman were intending to cross from Iran into Pakistan in a short time, but they were arrested in the middle of the country (Kerman) in the beginning of January 2025. They were accused of spying for "hostile foreign powers". They were kept together in the Kerman prison until July 2025, when they were moved to Tehran and separated: first to Tehran Bozorg (Fashafouyeh) prison, then to Evin prison in August; here they were held in different sections. In September and October 2025, the couple got several court sessions with judge Abolqasem Salavati. In February 2026, they were sentenced to 10 years in prison.		
Lindsay Foreman	15 January 2025	UK	689			
Vladimir Pronin	31 December 2025	Russia	325	He was arrested in Bandar Abbas while travelling in Iran. In February 2026, he was sentenced to 6 months for accusations of "taking photos of forbidden objects" (minimal term under the according article of the Penal code of Iran).		
Sergey Cheremisinov	7 January 2026	Russia	318	He was arrested in Shiraz during his trip to Iran for livestreaming protest demonstrations. Since his arrest, his location is unknown.		

== Armenian citizens ==
Name	Detained	Released	Days in detention	Reason for detention	Notes	Ref.
Silva Harotonian	26 June 2008	10 March 2009	257	Convicted of promoting a "soft" revolution in Iran on January 19, 2009, and sentenced to 3 years in prison.	At the time of her arrest, Harotonian was an administrative officer for a maternal and child health project in Tehran for International Research & Exchanges Board (IREX), a U.S. government-funded organization.	

== Australian citizens ==
Name	Detained	Released	Days in detention	Reason for detention	Notes	Ref.
Jolie King	1 July 2019	5 October 2019	96		Also holds British citizenship.	
Mark Firkin	1 July 2019	5 October 2019	96			
Meimanat Hosseini-Chavoshi	December 2018	27 January 2019	57		Iranian authorities have reportedly prevented her from leaving the country.	
Kylie Moore-Gilbert	September 2018	25 November 2020	792	Espionage	Also holds British citizenship.	

== Austrian citizens ==
Name	Detained	Released	Days in detention	Reason for detention	Notes	Ref.
Massud Mossaheb	January 2019	In detention	2881			
Kamran Ghaderi	2 January 2016	In detention	3976			

== Azerbaijani citizens ==
Name	Detained	Released	Days in detention	Reason for detention	Notes	Ref.
Farid Safarli	5 March 2023	18 January 2025	685	Espionage	Student at a German university at the time of his arrest. Travelled to Iran to meet his Iranian girlfriend, later arrested by the IRGC and held for 2 months in solitary confinement at the notorious Evin Prison. Farid Safarli's case has characteristics of a hostage situation. His detention came amid strained Azerbaijan-Iran relations early 2023, and his eventual release after almost 2 years was part of a prisoner exchange involving an Iranian spy held in Azerbaijan. This aligns with patterns seen in other cases where foreign nationals are detained in Iran under disputed charges to be used as a political bargaining chip.	
Rashid Aliyev	5 October 2008	11 August 2010	676	Espionage	Rashid Aliyev travelled to Iran in 2006 to work for the Sazan Electronics Industry Company in the city of Semnan, east of Tehran. Two years later he was accused of sending information on laser technology and electronic schemes to Azerbaijan and sentenced to 3 years in prison.	
Khalida Khalid	30 April 2013	19 May 2013	20	Espionage		
Shamkhal Huseynov	30 April 2013	19 May 2013	20	Espionage		
Farid Huseyn	2 May 2012	4 September 2012	126	Propaganda against the Islamic Republic of Iran	sentenced to 1 year in prison	
Shahriyar del Gerani (Hajiyev)	2 May 2012	4 September 2012	126	Propaganda against the Islamic Republic of Iran	sentenced to 1 year in prison	
Valida Yusifova	2021	July 2023	912	Espionage		

== Belgian citizens ==
Name	Detained	Released	Days in detention	Reason for detention	Notes	Ref.
Olivier Vandecasteele	February 2022	26 May 2023	479			
Diego Mathieu	16 September 2009	8 December 2009	83		Held in Evin Prison	
Vincent Boon Falleur	5 September 2009	8 December 2009	94		Held in Evin Prison	
Idesbald van den Bosch	5 September 2009	8 December 2009	94		Held in Evin Prison	

== British citizens ==
Name	Detained	Released	Days in detention	Reason for detention	Notes	Ref.
Ana Diamond	13 August 2014	21 April 2018	1347	Held in Evin prison on charges of blasphemy and cooperation with a hostile US government.		
Dr. Aebraham Diamond & Dr. Eleanor Abbott-Diamond	July 2014	February 2019	1706	Held in Evin prison for collaborating with hostile governments.	Parents of Ana Diamond	
Craig Foreman & Lindsay Foreman	January 2025	In detention	689			
Kameel Ahmady	11 August 2019	17 November 2019	98		Released on bail. Fled the regime.	
Mehran Raoof	16 October 2020	In detention	2227			
Abbas Edalat	15 April 2018	December 2018	230			
Morad Tahbaz	January 2018	18 September 2023	2086	Conspiring with America	Member of group of 5 released in Sept 2023 in exchange for 5 U.S. prisoners and unfreezing of $6 billion in Iranian assets. (Iranian national with US and UK citizenship.)	
Anoush Ashoori	August 2017	16 March 2022	1688	Convicted of spying for Israel's Mossad and sentenced to 12 years in prison.		
Nazanin Zaghari-Ratcliffe	3 April 2016	17 March 2020 (parole within 300 metres of house); 16 March 2022	2173 (part parole)	Sentenced to 5 years for "plotting to topple the Iranian government".	Iran (birth) / UK (2013) dual citizen	
Kamal Foroughi	5 May 2011	1 April 2020	3284			
Ghoncheh Ghavami	20 June 2014	23 November 2014	156			
Roya Saberi Negad Nobakht	October 2013	25 August 2017	1424		Subject to travel ban after release. Unclear if she has been permitted to depart Iran.	
Andrew Barber	21 June 2010	18 August 2010	58			
Iason Athanasiadis	17 June 2009	5 July 2009	18		Also holds Greek citizenship.	
Roger Cooper	7 December 1985	1 April 1991	1941			
Frank Skinner	27 April 1981	13 April 1982	351	Flight engineer for Iran Air held without charge.		
Andrew Pyke	27 August 1980	28 January 1982	519	British businessman who worked for Dutch-Iranian helicopter firm, accused of spying but never charged.		
Aras Amiri	14 March 2018	16 August 2021	1251	Sentenced to 10 years in prison for spying.		

== Canadian citizens ==
Name	Detained	Released	Days in detention	Reason for detention	Notes	Ref.
Kavous Seyed-Emami	24 January 2018	8 February 2018	15		Died in custody under suspicious circumstances. Authorities say he committed suicide.	
Abdolrasoul Dorri-Esfahani	August 2016	In detention	3871	In May 2017, convicted on espionage charges, including "collaborating with the British secret service," and sentenced to five years in prison.		
Homa Hoodfar	6 June 2016	26 September 2016	112	Undisclosed "security" charges	Before arrest, had been prevented from leaving country from March 2016.	
Maziar Bahari	21 June 2009	17 October 2009	118			
Hossein Derakhshan	1 November 2008	19 November 2014	2209	Sentenced to 19.5 years on "several national security, obscenity and religious insult charges in connection with his online activism."		
Hamid Ghassemi-Shall	24 May 2008	23 September 2013	1948			
Zahra Kazemi	23 June 2003	10 July 2003	17		Died in custody as a result of torture.	
Ramin Jahanbegloo	27 April 2006	30 August 2006	125	Plotting a "velvet revolution"		
Philip Engs	3 December 1986	8 February 1987	67	Manager of oil services company, held in solitary confinement and interrogated at Evin Prison on ““Suspicion of espionage”’, never formally charged, and then released unharmed.	Concessions were made by his employer on their contract for services with NIOC while he was detained.	

=== Canadian permanent residents ===
Name	Detained	Released	Days in detention	Reason for detention	Notes	Ref.
Saeed Malekpour	4 October 2008	3 August 2019	3955		Escaped Iran while on furlough from prison.	

== Dutch citizens ==
Name	Detained	Released	Days in detention	Reason for detention	Notes	Ref.
Sabri Hassanpour	19 April 2016	May 2018	742			
Zahra Bahrami	27 December 2009	Executed on 29 January 2011	398	Arrested while participating in the 2009 Ashura protests. Charged with the capital crime of drug trafficking. Executed by hanging on 29 January 2011.		
Cees Ljunberg	October 2019	24 February 2025	1959	Before arrest had been living in Iran for some time, working as a tour guide. Was accused of spying and sentenced to 10 years, was kept in Evin prison and released as part of a prisoner swap deal.		

== Finnish citizens ==
Name	Detained	Released	Days in detention	Reason for detention	Notes	Ref.
Ana Diamond	10 January 2016	January 2018	722	Arbitrary detention, later falsely accused of espionage for "MI6, CIA, Mossad, and others."	UK Permanent Resident at the time of arrest, as well as British naturalisation application in place. Subjected to travel ban shortly after her arrival in Iran in August 2014, ~500-days before her arrest in January 2016. Travel ban imposed again following her release from Evin prison on bail in August 2016. Acquitted of all charges in 2017 and travel ban lifted in May 2018.	

== French citizens ==
Name	Detained	Released	Days in detention	Reason for detention	Notes	Ref.
Fariba Adelkhah	5 June 2019	October 2023	1579			
Nazak Afshar	12 March 2016	In detention	3906			
Benjamin Brière	26 May 2020	12 May 2023	1081	spying and propaganda, for flying a drone in an unauthorised area and making social media posts concerning Iranian law		
Nelly Erin-Cambervelle	21 October 2018	21 February 2019	123	"signing an illegal mining contract and carrying out an unauthorized trip"	Erin-Cambervelle is a businesswoman from the French Caribbean island of Martinique.	
Stéphane Lherbier	29 November 2005	25 February 2007	453		Detained with German Donald Klein.	
Roland Marchal	June 2019	20 March 2020	293			
Bernard Phelan	3 October 2022	12 May 2023	221	Providing information to an enemy country	French-Irish. Sentenced to 6.5 years in February 2023. Had previously been sentenced to 3.5 years, and told he would be pardoned.	
Clotilde Reiss	1 July 2009	16 May 2010	319			
Cécile Kohler	1 May 2022	4 November 2025	1283	"attempting to incite unrest and helping teachers strike in Iran"		
Jacques Paris	1 May 2022	4 November 2025	1283	"attempting to incite unrest and helping teachers strike in Iran"		
Olivier Grondeau	October 2022	20 March 2025	887	Was arrested in Shiraz during the Mahsa Amini protests and sentenced to 5 years under spying accusations. Served about 2 years in prison in Shiraz, then was moved to Evin prison in Tehran.		
Lennart Monterlos	16 June 2025	6 October 2025	112	"arrested for committing a crime"		

=== French permanent residents ===
Name	Detained	Released	Days in detention	Reason for detention	Notes	Ref.
Ruhollah Zam	11 October 2019	Executed on 12 December 2020	428	Journalist, host of a 1.4 million follower Telegram channel covering the 2017–2018 Iranian protests.		

== German citizens ==
Name	Detained	Released	Days in detention	Reason for detention	Notes	Ref.
Helmut Szimkus	January 1989	14 June 1994	1666			
Helmut Hofer	September 1997	January 2000	852	Initially sentenced to death for having illicit sexual relations with an Iranian woman.		
Donald Klein	29 November 2005	12 March 2007	468			
Marcus Hellwig	10 October 2010	19 February 2011	132			
Jens Koch	10 October 2010	19 February 2011	132			
Jamshid Sharmahd	July 2020	Executed on 28 October 2024	1549	Journalistic activity criticizing the Islamic regime for 16 years	German citizen and US national. Jimmy was kidnapped on a business trip to India and taken to Iran. He has spent the entire detention at an unknown location, in solitary confinement and after what Amnesty International calls a sham trial condemned to death.	
Nahid Taghavi	16 October 2020	12 January 2025	1549		On 4 June 2023, Marges Mohammadi (also detained in Iran) wrote on Instagram that Taghavi's state of health is so bad that her life is in danger.	
Marek Kaufmann	21 June 2024	31 October 2025	497	Was arrested in Markazi province after accidentally entering a town forbidden for visiting by foreigners. Was sentenced to 2 years under accusations of "taking photos of forbidden objects" and was kept for some time in prison in Arak, then was moved to Evin prison in Tehran.		

== Italian citizens ==
Name	Detained	Released	Days in detention	Reason for detention	Notes	Ref.
Cecilia Sala	19 December 2024	8 January 2025	-20			

== Lebanese citizens ==
Name	Detained	Released	Days in detention	Reason for detention	Notes	Ref.
Nizar Zakka	15 September 2015	11 June 2019	1395		Permanent resident of the U.S. at time of arrest.	

== New Zealand citizens ==
Name	Detained	Released	Days in detention	Reason for detention	Notes	Ref.
Topher Richwhite	9 July 2022	27 October 2022	110	Travel blogger, detained following vehicle inspection at border		
Bridget Thackwray	9 July 2022	27 October 2022	110	Travel blogger, detained following vehicle inspection at border		

== Russian citizens ==
Name	Detained	Released	Days in detention	Reason for detention	Notes	Ref.
Yulia Yuzik	2 October 2019	10 October 2019	8			
Mikhail Drabkin	22 October 2024	15 December 2025	419	Was accused of "gathering information in order to harm Iran's security" in favor of Israel. During the interrogation (22.10.24 - 7.1.2025) his accusation was changed to "taking photos of prohibited places", he was sentenced to 3 years in prison. Then, due to his acceptance of the conviction, his sentence was reduced to 2 years 3 months. Then, in September 2025 got an amnesty; as a result, his sentence became 17 months. Finally was released at 15 December 2025 on condition		

== Swedish citizens ==
Name	Detained	Released	Days in detention	Reason for detention	Notes	Ref.
Unknown	June 2025	In detention, possibly executed (Note: uncertain if the two sources are about the same individual)	-	Accused of espionage.		
Ahmad Reza Jalali	24 April 2016	In detention	3863			
Habib Chaab	October 2020	Executed on 6 May 2023	947		Death sentence upheld by Iranian supreme court March 2023.	
Johan Floderus	17 April 2023	15 June 2024	425	Accused of espionage.		
Stefan Johansson	26 February 2006	16 April 2007	414	Convicted for espionage and sentenced to 3 years in prison.		
Jari Hjortmar	26 February 2006	16 April 2007	414	Convicted for espionage and sentenced to 3 years in prison.		

== South African citizens ==
Name	Detained	Released	Days in detention	Reason for detention	Notes	Ref.
Stuart Timm	10 January 1997	17 February 1997	38			

== United States citizens ==
Name	Detained	Released	Days in detention	Reason for detention	Notes	Ref.
Dena Karari	December 2024	15 July 2026	566	Espionage and collaboration with a hostile state	Briefly detained, released on bail, multiply interrogated, charged, and barred from leaving Iran under an exit ban.	
Emad Shargi	30 November 2020	18 September 2023	1022	Espionage and providing military information to foreign countries	Member of the September 2023 Iran–United States prisoner release. Released in exchange for five U.S. prisoners and unfreezing of $6 billion in Iranian assets. Had been sentenced to 10 years in January 2021. Had previously been cleared in December 2019. (Iranian national who also holds US citizenship.)	
Michael White	July 2018	19 March 2020	627			
Morad Tahbaz	January 2018	18 September 2023	2086	Conspiring with America	Member of the September 2023 Iran–United States prisoner release. Released in exchange for 5 U.S. prisoners and unfreezing of $6 billion in Iranian assets. (Iranian national who also holds US and UK citizenship.)	
Xiyue Wang	8 August 2016	7 December 2019	1216			
Gholamreza (Reza) "Robin" Shahini	11 July 2016	21 March 2017	253			
Karan Vafadari	20 July 2016	21 July 2018	731		Released on bail but reportedly has not been permitted to leave Iran.	
Baquer Namazi	22 February 2016	1 October 2022	2413		Released during the Mahsa Amini protests	
Siamak Namazi	13 October 2015	18 September 2023	2895	Espionage	Member of group of 5 released in Sept 2023 in exchange for 5 U.S. prisoners and unfreezing of $6 billion in Iranian assets. (Iranian national who also holds US citizenship.)	
Nosratollah Khosravi-Roodsari	May 2015	16 January 2016	260			
Matthew Trevithick	7 December 2015	16 January 2016	39			
Jason Rezaian	22 July 2014	16 January 2016	543			
Saeed Abedini	28 July 2012	16 January 2016	1277			
Masoud Jamali Ashtiani	20 May 2012	20 May 2013	365	Propaganda against the regime	41 days in solidarity confinement	
Afsaneh Azadeh	13 May 2012	September 2012	111		Azadeh was released from detention to house arrest from September 2012 – November 2012. She was not permitted to leave the country until May 2013.	
Amir Hekmati	29 August 2011	16 January 2016	1601			
Joshua Fattal	31 July 2009	21 September 2011	782			
Shane Bauer	31 July 2009	21 September 2011	782			
Sarah Shourd	31 July 2009	14 September 2010	410			
Roxana Saberi	31 January 2009	11 May 2009	100			
Esha Momeni	15 October 2008	10 November 2008	26		Momeni was released on bail in November 2008 but she was not permitted to leave Iran until August 2009.	
Reza Taghavi	May 2008	16 October 2010	898			
Nik Moradi	31 October 2007	15 April 2008	167			
Kian Tajbakhsh	11 May 2007	19 September 2007	131			
Ali Shakeri	8 May 2007	25 September 2007	140			
Haleh Esfandiari	8 May 2007	21 August 2007	105			
Robert Levinson (alleged)	9 March 2007	Presumed dead 25 March 2020	>1333 (alleged)		U.S. agent working for the CIA who disappeared on Kish Island. Proof of life in captivity in an unknown location was received in November 2010, but Iran has never acknowledged his arrest or detention; he was presumed dead in March 2020.	
Dariush Zahedi	10 July 2003	9 November 2003	122			
Daniel Baumann	10 January 1997	16 March 1997	65		Dual U.S.-Swiss citizen. Arrested with South African Stuart Timm.	
Gerald Seib	31 January 1987	4 February 1987	4		Wall Street Journal reporter who had been visiting Iran with a group of journalists.	
Jon Pattis	16 June 1986	October 1991	1933	Sentenced to 10 years in prison in 1987 for espionage.		
David Rabhan	1980	6 August 1990	3545			
Abbas Alizadeh	May 2021	19 August 2021	110	Espionage	House arrest. Released in return for Elamite tablets.	

=== United States permanent residents ===
Name	Detained	Released	Days in detention	Reason for detention	Notes	Ref.
Afshin Sheikholeslami Vatani	27 June 2020	In detention	2338		Released on bail in February 2019 but reportedly has not been permitted to leave Iran and then arrested again in 2020.	
Afarin Neyssari	20 July 2016	21 July 2018	731		Released on bail but reportedly has not been permitted to leave Iran.	
Shahab Dalili	20 March 2016	In detention	3898	cooperating with a hostile government	U.S. permanent resident	
Jamshid Sharmahd	1 August 2020	Executed on 28 October 2024	1549	Accused of complicity in the 2008 Shiraz bombing.	German citizen and U.S. permanent resident. Sharmahd was kidnapped on a business trip to India and taken to Iran. He has spent the entire detention at an unknown location, in solitary confinement and after what Amnesty International calls a sham trial condemned to death.	

=== Iran hostage crisis detainees (1979–1981) ===
Name	Detained	Released	Days in detention	Notes
Cynthia Dwyer	5 May 1980	10 February 1981	281	Civilian. Freelance writer convicted on trumped-up charges of espionage and other crimes
Mohi Sobhani	6 September 1980	4 February 1981	151	Civilian
Thomas L. Ahern, Jr.	4 November 1979	20 January 1981	444	
Clair Cortland Barnes	4 November 1979	20 January 1981	444	
William E. Belk	4 November 1979	20 January 1981	444	
Robert O. Blucker	4 November 1979	20 January 1981	444	
Donald J. Cooke	4 November 1979	20 January 1981	444	
William J. Daugherty	4 November 1979	20 January 1981	444	
Robert Englemann	4 November 1979	20 January 1981	444	
William Gallegos	4 November 1979	20 January 1981	444	
Bruce W. German	4 November 1979	20 January 1981	444	
Duane L. Gillette	4 November 1979	20 January 1981	444	
Alan B. Golacinski	4 November 1979	20 January 1981	444	
John E. Graves	4 November 1979	20 January 1981	444	
Joseph M. Hall	4 November 1979	20 January 1981	444	
Kevin J. Hermening	4 November 1979	20 January 1981	444	
Donald R. Hohman	4 November 1979	20 January 1981	444	
Leland J. Holland	4 November 1979	20 January 1981	444	
Michael Howland	4 November 1979	20 January 1981	444	
Charles A. Jones, Jr.	4 November 1979	20 January 1981	444	
Malcolm K. Kalp	4 November 1979	20 January 1981	444	
Moorhead C. Kennedy Jr.	4 November 1979	20 January 1981	444	American Foreign Service officer
William F. Keough, Jr.	4 November 1979	20 January 1981	444	
Steven W. Kirtley	4 November 1979	20 January 1981	444	
Kathryn L. Koob	4 November 1979	20 January 1981	444	
Frederick Lee Kupke	4 November 1979	20 January 1981	444	
Bruce Laingen	4 November 1979	20 January 1981	444	American diplomat
Steven Lauterbach	4 November 1979	20 January 1981	444	
Gary E. Lee	4 November 1979	20 January 1981	444	
Paul Edward Lewis	4 November 1979	20 January 1981	444	
John Limbert	4 November 1979	20 January 1981	444	American diplomat
John D. McKeel, Jr.	4 November 1979	20 January 1981	444	
Michael J. Metrinko	4 November 1979	20 January 1981	444	
Jerry J. Miele	4 November 1979	20 January 1981	444	
Michael E. Moeller	4 November 1979	20 January 1981	444	
Bert C. Moore	4 November 1979	20 January 1981	444	
Richard Morefield	4 November 1979	20 January 1981	444	
Paul M. Needham, Jr.	4 November 1979	20 January 1981	444	
Robert C. Ode	4 November 1979	20 January 1981	444	
Gregory A. Persinger	4 November 1979	20 January 1981	444	
Jerry Plotkin	4 November 1979	20 January 1981	444	Civilian
Regis Ragan	4 November 1979	20 January 1981	444	
David M. Roeder	4 November 1979	20 January 1981	444	
Barry M. Rosen	4 November 1979	20 January 1981	444	
William B. Royer, Jr.	4 November 1979	20 January 1981	444	
Thomas E. Schaefer	4 November 1979	20 January 1981	444	
Charles W. Scott	4 November 1979	20 January 1981	444	
Donald A. Sharer	4 November 1979	20 January 1981	444	
Rodney V. Sickmann	4 November 1979	20 January 1981	444	
Joseph Subic, Jr.	4 November 1979	20 January 1981	444	
Elizabeth Ann Swift	4 November 1979	20 January 1981	444	
Victor L. Tomseth	4 November 1979	20 January 1981	444	American diplomat
Phillip R. Ward	4 November 1979	20 January 1981	444	
Richard Queen	4 November 1979	11 July 1980	250	American diplomat
Wesley Williams	4 November 1979	20 November 1979	16	
Joan Walsh	4 November 1979	20 November 1979	16	
David Walker	4 November 1979	20 November 1979	16	
Joseph Vincent	4 November 1979	20 November 1979	16	
Terri Tedford	4 November 1979	20 November 1979	16	
Neal Robinson	4 November 1979	20 November 1979	16	
Lloyd Rollins	4 November 1979	20 November 1979	16	
Elizabeth Montagne	4 November 1979	20 November 1979	16	
Lillian Johnson	4 November 1979	20 November 1979	16	
James Hughes	4 November 1979	20 November 1979	16	
Kathy Gross	4 November 1979	19 November 1979	15	
Ladell Maples	4 November 1979	19 November 1979	15	
William Quarles	4 November 1979	19 November 1979	15	

== See also ==
- Iranian nationality law
- Iran's hostage diplomacy
- Human rights in Iran
- Lebanon hostage crisis
- Iran hostage crisis
