= Iran's hostage diplomacy =

Arbitrary detention by Iran

Iran hostage diplomacy refers to the use of arbitrary detention of foreign nationals and dual citizens by the Islamic Republic of Iran as a tool of statecraft. This practice is employed to exert pressure on other governments, extract concessions, or influence negotiations—particularly in relation to sanctions, frozen assets, and nuclear diplomacy. While hostage diplomacy is not unique to Iran, analysts identify the country as a primary practitioner, embedding it into its foreign policy over the past four decades.

== Historical origins ==
The origins of Iranian hostage diplomacy lie in the 1979–1981 Iran hostage crisis, when 52 American diplomats and citizens were held at the U.S. Embassy in Tehran for 444 days. The crisis ended with the Algiers Accords, which saw Iran release the hostages in exchange for unfreezing billions in Iranian assets and creating a bilateral claims tribunal. This episode established a precedent: hostages could be leveraged as political and financial bargaining chips.

== Evolution into state policy ==
Following the 1980s, hostage-taking evolved from an occasional tactic into a systematic strategy:

- By the 2000s, Iran increasingly targeted dual nationals, often with Western ties, charging them with espionage or "collaborating with hostile states."
- According to Release Peace, the practice became a "dark art" of statecraft: detentions served not only judicial but strategic purposes, coinciding with moments of heightened tension in nuclear negotiations or sanctions regimes.
- Hostage diplomacy also functions as a domestic signal of resistance against foreign influence, bolstering Iran's revolutionary legitimacy while extracting international concessions.

== Contemporary cases ==
=== Detention of Europeans ===
Research by Ifri shows that Iran has used the detention of European nationals as diplomatic leverage, particularly against France, Germany, and the UK. Notable cases include French academics, aid workers, and activists imprisoned under charges of espionage. Despite EU sanctions and public condemnations, the tactic has continued with little deterrence effect.

In 2025, Italian journalist Cecilia Sala and German-Iranian activist Nahid Taghavi were released shortly before renewed nuclear negotiations, highlighting the link between detentions and diplomatic timing.

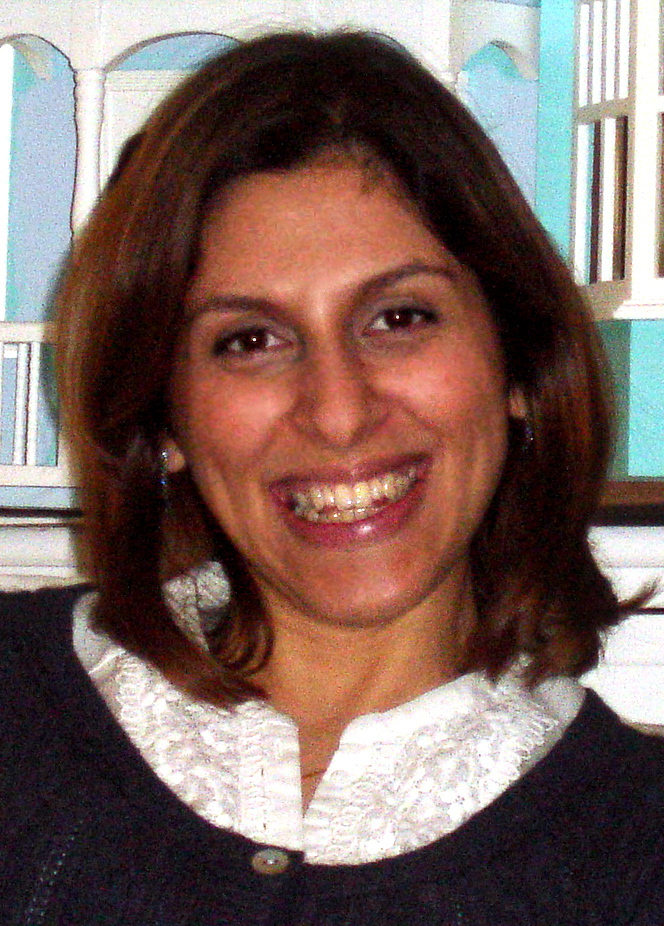
Nazanin Zaghari

Nazanin Zaghari-Ratcliffe is a British-Iranian dual citizen and journalist who was detained in Iran from 3 April 2016 to 16 March 2022. In April 2016, she was sentenced to five years in prison on charges of "conspiring to overthrow the Iranian government," and was temporarily released under supervision on March 17, 2020. She has always denied the espionage charges against her, and her husband believes his wife was "imprisoned as leverage that Britain owed Iran for not delivering tanks to Iran in 1979." Along with Anoosheh Ashoori, she left Iran on March 16, 2022, after the payment of $530 million to the Islamic Republic.

In January 2025, Lindsay and Craig Foreman, a British couple traveling around the world by motorcycle, were detained in the city of Kerman and in February 2026, they were sentenced to 10 years in prison by the Revolutionary Court on security charges, including espionage.

=== Detentions of U.S. citizens ===
Iran has consistently detained U.S. nationals on charges of espionage, with groups like the Washington Institute estimating that Iran has taken more U.S. hostages than any other country since 1979. A prominent recent example occurred in 2023, when the Biden administration negotiated the release of five U.S. citizens in exchange for access to $6 billion in frozen oil revenues earmarked for humanitarian purpose.

In early 2025, amid escalating tensions and U.S. military strikes on Iranian facilities, Tehran detained at least five more Americans, including journalist Reza Valizadeh, who launched a hunger strike while imprisoned.

Around 100 American citizens have been taken hostage by Iran since 1979.

== Methods and objectives ==
Iranian hostage diplomacy typically involves:

1. Targeting dual nationals: Individuals with Western citizenship are accused of espionage, "propaganda against the state," or "corruption on earth."
2. Secrecy and opaque trials: Detainees often face closed Revolutionary Court proceedings, with limited legal representation.
3. Negotiated exchanges: Releases are often tied to prisoner swaps, sanctions relief, or access to frozen assets abroad.
4. Symbolic timing: Arrests and releases frequently coincide with milestones in nuclear negotiations or regional tensions.

== Criticism and international response ==
Diplomatic challenges: European states and the U.S. have struggled to build a unified deterrence policy. Critics argue that prisoner swaps incentivize future detentions, effectively validating hostage diplomacy as a bargaining strategy.

Policy proposals: Analysts at the Atlantic Council and Washington Institute urge stronger deterrence, including coordinated sanctions against individuals involved, stricter travel advisories, and increased transparency around detainees’ cases.

Civil society: NGOs such as Release Peace and Hostage Aid and Hostagesses Alliance advocate international legal frameworks and accountability mechanisms to classify state hostage-taking as a crime under international law (Release Peace, Hostage Aid).

== See also ==
- List of foreign nationals detained in Iran
- Human rights in Iran
- Lebanon hostage crisis
- Iran hostage crisis
