= Kamran Ghaderi =

Iranian-Austrian businessman imprisoned in Iran

Kamran Ghaderi (Persian: کامران قادری) is an Iranian-Austrian businessman who was imprisoned in Iran until 2023. Iranian authorities arrested Ghaderi on 2 January 2016 upon his arrival in Iran from Austria for a routine business trip. On 17 October 2016, the Iranian judiciary sentenced Ghaderi to 10 years in prison for espionage, along with the dual and foreign nationals Siamak Namazi, Baquer Namazi, and Nizar Zakka. For nearly the first year of his arrest, Ghaderi has been held in solitary confinement in Ward 209 of Evin Prison. In April 2017, he was transferred to the general ward of Evin, where he shares a 25m² cell without windows with 16 other prisoners. The cell is infested with cockroaches, bed bugs, and rats.

Ghaderi is married to Harika. They have three children.

== See also ==
- List of foreign nationals detained in Iran
