= Jens Koch =

German photographer (born 1981)

Jens Koch (born in 1981) is a German photographer who worked for the weekly BILD am Sonntag. In October 2010 he was arrested in Iran, together with his work partner Marcus Hellwig while interviewing the son of Sakineh Ashtiani.

== The case ==
=== Imprisonment ===
Koch and Hellwig arrived in Iran in October 2010 with a tourist visa. The next day, while they were in Tabriz interviewing Sadjad Qaderzadeh (Ashtiani's son), Iranian authorities arrested the two reporters. Sadjad Qaderzadeh and his lawyer were also arrested at the scene.

=== Charges by Iranian Judiciary ===
Throughout their detention, Jens Koch and Hellwig were accused of several crimes from espionage to having links to groups of Iranian exiles, and officials also said the two admitted breaking the laws that forbid those entering the country from working as journalists. Jens Koch and Hellwig were sentenced to 20 months prison for "committing acts against Iran's National Security".

=== Release ===
On February 19, 2011, the reporter's 20 month sentences were reduced to a $50,000 fine each. Both later returned to Germany on a government plane after serving 4 months of imprisonment.

== See also ==
- List of foreign nationals detained in Iran
