= Hostagesses Alliance =

Human rights organization

- Abbreviation: HAlliance
- Formation: 2021; 5 years ago
- Type: Non-governmental organization
- Headquarters: London, United Kingdom
- Key people: Ana Diamond
- Website: halliance.org

The Hostagesses Alliance, also known as the Hostage Alliance for Women, is a London-based advocacy organisation founded in 2021 by Ana Diamond, a former hostage, to campaign on behalf of women and girls subjected to hostage-taking and related abuses.

The organisation works to raise awareness of state and non-state hostage-taking, including gender-based violence and mistreatment of female detainees, as well as advocates for international action against state-level hostage diplomacy.

Hostagesses Alliance is a specialised branch of the broader the Alliance Against State Hostage Taking, developed from the global initiative launched in New York City during the 2019 United Nations 74th General Assembly. The Hostagesses Alliance is committed to the International Convention against the Taking of Hostages, and the UK driven 2013 G8 Summit's focus on preventing the kidnapping of ordinary citizens by terrorist groups for ransom.

== Advocacy in individual hostage cases ==
The Alliance has participated in advocacy surrounding several high-profile hostage and unlawful detention cases. These have included the Australian-British academic Kylie Moore-Gilbert, an Iranian-British dual citizen Nazanin Zaghari-Ratcliffe, British couple Craig and Lindsay Foreman, an Iranian British Council employee Aras Amiri, a British–Iranian businessman Anoosheh Ashoori, as well as British national Emily Damari.

== Policy and legislative impact ==
The organisation has also supported wider policy efforts aimed at addressing state-sponsored hostage-taking. Its advocacy has been linked to the development and passage of Magnitsky legislation in the United Kingdom, which introduced targeted sanctions against individuals responsible for human rights abuses. The laws are named in honour of Sergei Magnitsky, a Russian tax advisor whose exposure of corruption and misconduct in Russia led to his arrest and death in police custody.

== Mission and activities ==
Hostagesses Alliance is a women-led non-governmental organisation focused on improving the safety of women and girls affected by hostage-taking, kidnapping, and unlawful detention. The organisation carries out research, advocacy, public education, training workshops, and policy consultation at local, national, and international levels.

Hostagesses Alliance attracts global attention since its concentrated presence and activities in London, a city whose long history of women-supporting movements, has made it a forerunner in advancing women’s rights and establishing a culture in which women’s leadership plays a decisive role in navigating international crises and shaping decision-makings dialectics.
