= Nizar Zakka =

Lebanese national

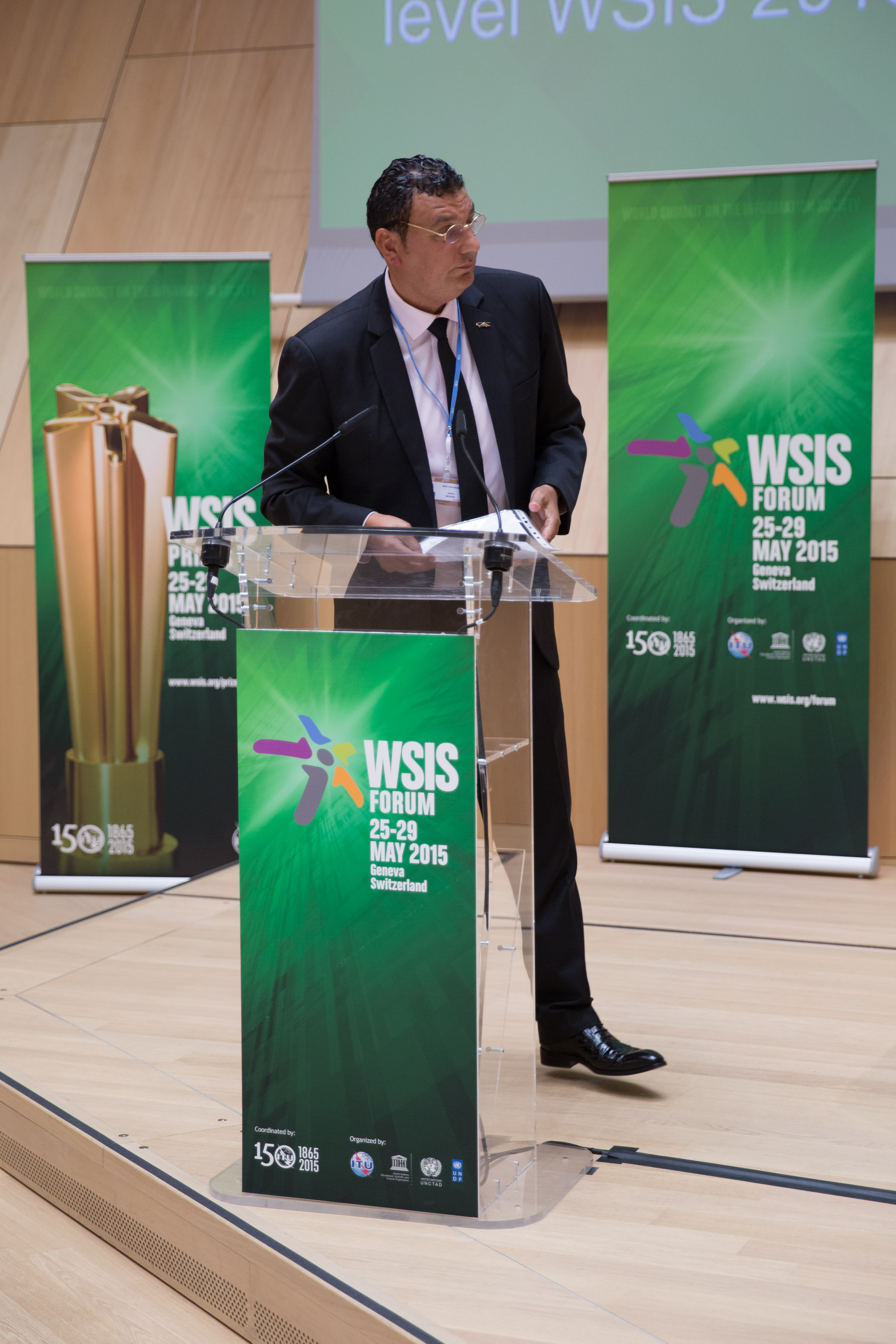
- Born: Lebanon
- Citizenship: Lebanese
- Education: Riverside Military Academy; University of Texas

Nizar Zakka (Arabic: نزار زکا) is a Lebanese national who was arrested by Iran in 2015, and was imprisoned until 2019 on charges of espionage for the United States. Zakka worked as an Internet freedom advocate and served as secretary general of the Arab Information and Communications Technology (ICT) Organization (IJMA3) in Washington, D.C., and is a US permanent resident.

On September 8, 2018, the person who had invited Nizar to visit Iran, Shahindokht Molaverdi, the top aide for citizenship rights to Iran's President Hassan Rouhani, told the Associated Press that the Iranian government had not approved Nizar's imprisonment, and that "[w]e did all we could to stop this from happening, but we are seeing that we have failed to make a significant impact." She blamed a "complete miscoordination" between Iran's civilian government and its independent judiciary, adding that "actions by one branch can ignore or neutralize efforts by another branch".

Despite the admission Iran was holding him against his will, Zakka remained a hostage in Iran until June 2019. With the sponsorship of his home country president, General Michel Aoun, Zakka was released from Iran on June 11, 2019, and flew straight to Beirut.

== Early life and education ==
Nizar Zakka was born in Lebanon, and holds permanent-resident status in the U.S. He attended the Riverside Military Academy in Gainesville, Georgia, for high school, graduating in 1985. He attended the University of Texas, earning a Bachelor of Science degree in computer science and mathematics in 1989 and a Master of Science in computer science in 1991.

== Arrest in Iran ==
Zakka traveled to Tehran on September 15, 2015 to participate in a conference on entrepreneurship, at the invitation of the Iranian government. On September 18, he disappeared while on the way to the airport to leave the country. On October 31, 2015, the Beirut-based Daily Star reported that the Iranian Revolutionary Guard (IRGC) was holding Zakka.

On November 3, 2015, in the first official confirmation of his arrest, Iranian state broadcaster IRIB said Zakka was in the custody of authorities on suspicion of being an American spy. IRIB described him as a "treasure trove" because of "connections with intelligence and military bodies in the United States". As evidence, Iranian state TV displayed a photo of Zikka in army-style fatigues, which Zakka's family identified from a homecoming parade he participated in as an alumnus of his military high school in Georgia.

Prior to his arrest in Iran, he was living in Washington, D.C., where he served as the secretary general of the Arab ICT Organization, known as IJMA3. Zakka’s family said they were "shocked by these false accusations" and stressed that he had no "relation with any military, security institution or secret services whatsoever".

== Support for Nizar's release ==
On January 9, 2017, the United Nations Special Rapporteur on the human rights situation in Iran, Ms. Asma Jahangir, raised alarm over the critical health situation of several prisoners of conscience, including Zakka, on prolonged hunger strike in the country.

The United States Congress approved two resolutions, H.Res.317 and S.Res.245, that mentioned Zakka and other U.S. persons unlawfully detained in Iran. Congress urged President Trump to "take whatever steps are in the national interest to secure the release of such individuals. Lawmakers also stressed the need to "make the release of U.S. citizens and legal permanent resident aliens held hostage by the Iranian government the highest of priorities."

Zakka is one of a number of dual citizens and foreign nationals detained in Iran in recent years, mostly on an accusation of spying, including several Americans: Karan Vafadari and Afarin Neyssari, a Zoroastrian couple who were sentenced to 15 and 10 years in prison in 2018; Xiyue Wang, a doctoral student conducting historical research who was sentenced to 10 years in prison in 2017; Baquer Namazi and Siamak Namazi, a former UN official and his son who were both sentenced to 10 years in prison in 2016; and Morad Tahbaz, an environmental activist who was arrested in 2018.

The U.S. holds some Iranians for allegedly violating sanctions. In April 2019, Iranian Foreign Minister Mohammad Javad Zarif suggested negotiating prisoner exchange with the U.S.

== Release ==
Zakka was released by the Iranian government on 11 June 2019, following a request by Lebanon's President Michel Aoun and Lebanese Minister of Foreign Affairs Gebran Bassil. A White House spokesperson said the U.S. was thankful for Zakka’s release.

== See also ==
- List of foreign nationals detained in Iran
