= Hostage Aid Worldwide =

Non-profit organization

- Formation: 2020; 6 years ago
- Type: Humanitarian Aid Organizations
- Headquarters: Washington, D.C., United States (U.S.)
- President: Nizar Zakka
- Website: hostageaid.org

Hostage Aid Worldwide is a non-profit entity founded through the collective efforts of former hostages, affected families, and expert practitioners. The organization is dedicated to addressing the phenomenon of hostage-taking, with a mission that encompasses both advocacy for the release of current hostages and the development of preventive strategies to reduce the occurrence of such violations.

Board members include former hostages such as Nizar Zakka (who is also president), Masih Alinejad, Siamak Namazi, Dr. Shoshan Haran and others.

In addition to offering humanitarian assistance to current and former hostages and unlawfully detained individuals, the organization works with technology experts and stakeholders to analyze and address the structures that enable hostage-taking. This includes developing data-driven methods to disrupt its underlying mechanisms. As part of these efforts, the organization has introduced an artificial intelligence–based tracking system intended to support governments, non-governmental organizations, advocates, and families in pursuing practical measures to counter hostage-taking and unlawful detention.

The NPO has been active in efforts to help in ongoing hostage situations such the Hamas-held hostages abducted on October 7 attacks 2023, and the kidnapped US journalist Austin Tice.
