= Dena Karari =

Iranian-American technology professional and nonprofit founder

Dena Karari (Persian: دنا کراری) is an Iranian-American technology professional, an employee of the cybersecurity company Palo Alto Networks, and the founder of the Children of Mehr Foundation. She became publicly known after Iranian authorities prevented her from leaving Iran from December 2024 until July 2026 and investigated her over allegations of espionage and collaboration with a hostile state. Karari was permitted to leave Iran on July 15, 2026, and returned to the United States on July 18, 2026. In August 2026, Karari's legal team announced that Branch 2 of the Revolutionary Court in Zahedan had convicted her in absentia of conspiracy and collusion to commit crimes against national security under Article 610 of Iran's Islamic Penal Code and sentenced her to five years in prison.

== Background ==
Karari was born in Mamasani County, Fars province, Iran. She is a resident of the San Francisco Bay Area and an employee of Palo Alto Networks, an American cybersecurity company.

Karari founded and operated the Children of Mehr Foundation, a United States-based nonprofit organization that assisted disadvantaged children in Iran. The foundation used private donations and operated under authorization from the United States Department of the Treasury's Office of Foreign Assets Control.

== Exit ban and investigation in Iran ==
Karari traveled to Iran in November 2024 to visit relatives in Shiraz. Shortly before her planned departure in December 2024, she was raided and briefly detained by Iranian authorities, who confiscated her American and Iranian passports and prevented her from departing.

Iranian authorities subsequently questioned Karari on multiple occasions. She was interrogated dozens of times by Iran's Ministry of Intelligence and Security and was subjected to what was characterized as a coercive exit ban. The investigation focused on Karari's association with the Children of Mehr Foundation and her employment, and involved allegations of espionage and collaboration with a hostile state, which she and her legal team denied.

CNN cited a source familiar with the case who said that Karari had been detained, charged, released on bail and placed under an exit ban. The New York Times reported that she faced espionage charges while being prevented from leaving the country.

The case was initially reported without Karari's name in August 2025. The New York Times described an Iranian-American woman who worked for an American technology company, operated a charity for children in Iran, and had been prevented from leaving Iran since December 2024.

In April 2026, Karari's exit ban formally expired and, since her passports had been returned, she attempted to leave Iran but was turned back by authorities and remained unable to depart.

== Release and return to the United States ==
On July 15, 2026, United States president Donald Trump announced that Iran had allowed an unnamed American citizen who had been prevented from leaving the country since December 2024 to depart. Trump described Iran's decision as a gesture of goodwill.

The New York Times subsequently identified the woman as Dena Karari. CNN and UPI reported that she was safely outside Iran and traveling to the United States. Her release occurred amid heightened military and diplomatic tensions between the United States and Iran. CNN reported that Karari's representatives had raised her case with the White House and officials involved in negotiations with Iran, although the precise circumstances leading to her departure were not publicly disclosed.

Karari's friends and family had lobbied for her release. Upon news of her freedom, Dr. Mehrdad Mobasher, a close friend in California who helped lead the advocacy efforts, told The New York Times that he was “overwhelmed with relief and gratitude” and described seeing Karari reach safety as an emotional moment for her friends and family.

On July 17, the Iranian judiciary-affiliated Mizan News Agency denied that any “imprisoned US convict or spy” had been released or exchanged from Iranian prisons. IranWire noted that Karari had not been formally jailed and that Mizan's statement did not directly address her departure from Iran or the lifting of her travel restrictions.

Karari arrived at San Francisco International Airport on July 18, 2026.

After Karari's release, her international human rights lawyer, Jared Genser, called on Iranian authorities to end proceedings against people in Iran who had worked locally with the Children of Mehr Foundation. He also called for the release of other Americans and Iranian political prisoners held in Iran.

== Conviction in absentia ==
On August 19, 2026, Karari's legal team announced that Branch 2 of the Revolutionary Court in Zahedan had convicted her in absentia under Article 610 of Iran's Islamic Penal Code on a charge of conspiracy and collusion to commit crimes against national security and sentenced her to five years in prison. The judgment was dated August 16, 2026.

Radio Farda reported that the court was presided over by Judge Mehdi Sarhadi Rad and that two other volunteers associated with a non-governmental organization involved in the case were each sentenced to five years in prison on similar charges.

Karari rejected the conviction and denied that her humanitarian work helping disadvantaged children obtain access to education constituted a threat to national security. Her international lawyer, Jared Genser, called the judgment baseless and said that her legal team would pursue available legal avenues to overturn it.

== See also ==
- Hostage diplomacy
- Iran–United States relations
- List of foreign nationals detained in Iran
- Human rights in the Islamic Republic of Iran
