= Ryan Fayhee =

- Occupation: Attorney
- Employer: Akin Gump Strauss Hauer & Feld
- Known for: National security law, crisis management, American hostage advocacy
- Website: www.akingump.com/en/lawyers-advisors/ryan-fayhee

Ryan Fayhee is an American attorney based in Washington, D.C., practicing national security law, global investigations and crisis management. He is a partner at the law firm Akin Gump Strauss Hauer & Feld and a former United States Department of Justice (DOJ) national security official. He is known for pro bono advocacy on behalf of Americans held hostage or wrongfully detained overseas. Fayhee sits on the board of the James W. Foley Legacy Foundation and is a member of the advisory council of the McCain Institute's Freedom for Political Prisoners Initiative.

== Early career and Department of Justice ==
Fayhee joined the DOJ through the Attorney General's Honors Program and served in the National Security Division's Counterespionage Section, where he prosecuted counterespionage cases and brought sanctions and export-control prosecutions. He was one of the prosecutors in the 2008 Chinese espionage cases against Tai Shen Kuo and Defense Department analyst Gregg Bergersen. In October 2010, he was among the Justice Department personnel named in a team Attorney General's Award for Excellence in Furthering the Interests of U.S. National Security, given for Operation Render Safe, an investigation that led to charges against more than 35 individuals and entities over the supply of military and dual-use goods to Iran, including components that were used to harm U.S. troops in Iraq and Afghanistan. He was among the members of the special prosecution team led by then-U.S. Attorney Patrick Fitzgerald in the case against former CIA officer John Kiriakou, who was sentenced in January 2013.

== Notable representations ==
=== Wrongfully detained Americans ===
Fayhee has represented several Americans held hostage or wrongfully detained abroad.

Paul Whelan — Fayhee acted pro bono for the Whelan family since January 2019, in efforts to secure Whelan's release and advising the case. Since Whelan’s arrest in 2018, Fayhee had limited phone contacts due to Russian surveillance and Whelan’s national security background. That culminated in a prisoner exchange on 1 August 2024, involving 24 prisoners and 6 countries. He was widely quoted on Whelan's condition and on U.S. hostage-diplomacy policy.

Paul Rusesabagina — Fayhee was part of the legal team representing Rusesabagina, the subject of the film Hotel Rwanda, during his detention in Rwanda from August 2020 to March 2023.

Ryan Corbett — Fayhee represented the family of Corbett, a U.S. citizen detained by the Taliban in Afghanistan, and sought intervention from the UN Working Group on Arbitrary Detention.

Members of Mountain Gateway Church — Fayhee and colleagues at Akin Gump led pro bono efforts to secure the release of missionaries convicted and detained by the Nicaraguan government.

Reza Valizadeh — Fayhee represents Valizadeh, a former Radio Free Europe/Radio Liberty journalist held in Evin Prison in Tehran, and has urged that detained Americans be included in U.S.–Iran negotiations.

=== Corporate boards in crisis ===
Fayhee was retained by the board of the Swiss multinational Holcim Group to lead an independent investigation into legacy Lafarge operations in Syria, which involved allegations of payments made to ISIS to protect a cement plant during the Syrian civil war. Several Lafarge executives were later prosecuted in France. Lafarge pleaded guilty in a resolution with the DOJ and paid more than $700 million in penalties.

== Recognition ==
Akin Gump was recognized by Bloomberg Law as a Pro Bono Innovator in 2023, with Fayhee's hostage and wrongful-detention work featured in the write-up.
