= Ghoncheh Ghavami =

Iranian activist

Ghoncheh Ghavami (born 1989), also spelled as Goncheh Ghavami (Persian: غنچه قوامی), is a British-Iranian law graduate of the School of Oriental and African Studies, University of London who was held in solitary confinement in Evin Prison for protesting for equal access to sporting events in Iran.

On 20 June 2014 she was arrested for the first time after she attempted to attend a men-only volleyball match in Azadi Indoor Stadium of Tehran. Women have been prohibited from attending male-only football matches in Iran since 1979, and this restriction was extended to volleyball matches in 2012. Although she was released on the same day, she was re-arrested days later when she returned to collect her belongings; she was then taken to Evin Prison. Her arrest raised international protests, but Iranian officials denied the link between her arrest and the volleyball match. She was charged with "propaganda against the regime", according to Gholamhossein Mohseni-Ejeie, the second-ranking member of Iran's judiciary.

Ghavami was released on bail on 23 November 2014. She was sentenced to a one-year jail term and a two-year travel ban.

== Life ==
Ghavami was born circa 1989 and has an elder brother. She lived in Shepherd's Bush in London in 2014. She has dual British and Iranian nationality. She studied law and graduated from the Law School at the School of Oriental and African Studies, University of London. She worked for a charity in Iran teaching children to read and write.

== Arrest and detention ==
On 20 June 2014, Ghavami was detained while trying to enter a Volleyball World League match (Iran vs Italy) at Azadi Indoor Stadium in Tehran. She and other women's rights campaigners were protesting outside the stadium for equal access to sporting events. It is illegal for women to interact with male spectators at sports facilities in Iran. This law was allegedly introduced to protect female spectators from the lewd behaviour of other spectators. The arrested campaigners broke this law.

Ghavami was arrested at the security gate to the stadium and released on bail. When she returned a week later to collect her belongings, she was re-arrested and taken to Evin Prison where she was held in solitary confinement. She shared a cell for a brief while with Atena Farghadani, an Iranian artist and political activist. She began a hunger strike on 1 October 2014 after being held in solitary detention for 100 days.

We wanted to go to the stadium together. We wanted to go sit on those chairs to scream and cheer for our national team.

— Shiva Nazar Ahari, one of the women protesting alongside Ghavami at the game.

Iran's judiciary has denied that the charges against Ghavami are related to her stadium visit, stating she was charged with "propaganda against the regime".

Miss Ghavami's arrest and imprisonment has nothing to do with the issue of sports and women's participations in stadiums, and is a national security matter.

— Ghulam Hussein Mohseni Ejeyie, spokesman for the Iranian judiciary.

Ghavami was released on bail in November 2014. The New York Times reported Ghavami's bail as being "around $30,000" and reported that the Iranian authorities would not allow her to return to the UK due to her two-year travel ban.

== Responses ==
A Change.org petition started by her brother, aiming to free her and bring her back to the United Kingdom, was signed by over 750,000.

In an open letter to President Hassan Rouhani, 300 Iranian human and civil rights activists highlighted the conditions Ghavami was being held under.

The foreign secretary of the United Kingdom, Philip Hammond, raised her case with Mohammad Javad Zarif, Iranian Minister for Foreign Affairs, at talks at the United Nations in New York City. However, Iran does not recognise her dual nationality as a British citizen.

== See also ==
- Offside (2006 Iranian film)
- Iran–United Kingdom relations
- List of foreign nationals detained in Iran
- Kamal Foroughi
