= Kamal Foroughi =

British-Iranian businessman (1939–2024)

- Born: Kamal Foroughi; 3 September 1939; Iran
- Died: 3 June 2024 (aged 84)
- Citizenship: United Kingdom, Iran
- Occupation: Businessman
- Known for: Imprisonment in Iran

Kamal Foroughi (Persian: کمال فروغی; 3 September 1939 – 3 June 2024) was a British-Iranian businessman who was imprisoned in Evin Prison in Tehran, Iran. He is the oldest hostage of all time ever recorded in the world’s hostage history. Iranian authorities arrested him in May 2011 while he was 72 years old and living in Tehran as a consultant for the Malaysian national oil and gas company Petronas. In 2013, he was sentenced to eight years in prison, seven for espionage and an additional year for possessing alcohol in his home.

== Background ==
Foroughi was born on 3 September 1939. He moved to Britain from Iran in the 1970s. He has two children.

Foroughi later suffered from Alzheimer's disease. He died on 3 June 2024, at the age of 84.

== Arrest and imprisonment in Iran ==
On 14 October 2015, The Guardian reported for the first time that Foroughi, a "76-year-old British national has been held in an Iranian jail for more than four years and convicted of spying." His family chose to publicly speak out years after his arrest in order to "draw attention to the plight of a man they describe as one of the 'oldest and loneliest prisoners in Iran.'"

Iranian plain clothes authorities arrested Foroughi on 5 May 2011. They "apparently did not show an arrest warrant or explain to him the reasons for arrest." At the time, he was working in Tehran as a consultant for the Malaysian national oil and gas company Petronas. They jailed him in Evin Prison, "where he was held in solitary confinement for periods of time, without access to a lawyer or his family." In 2013, Foroughi was sentenced to eight years in prison, seven for espionage and an additional year for possessing alcohol in his home. His son Kamran said, "My dad’s detention has been a total nightmare for all the family… We are not aware of any evidence that justifies the espionage charge."

=== Calls for release ===
On 11 December 2015, The Daily Telegraph and The Independent reported that UK Prime Minister David Cameron had personally written to the President of Iran, Hassan Rouhani, requesting the release of Foroughi. During a visit to Tehran in August 2015, UK Foreign Secretary Philip Hammond also raised the case of Foroughi with Rouhani.

=== Release from prison ===
Foroughi was released from detention in late 2018 but was unable to return to his family in Britain as he waited for his Iranian passport to be renewed. On 1 April 2020, the British Foreign and Commonwealth Office said in a statement that he had returned to the United Kingdom.

== See also ==
- List of foreign nationals detained in Iran
- Nazanin Zaghari-Ratcliffe
- Ghoncheh Ghavami
- Hostage diplomacy
