= Afshin Sheikholeslami Vatani =

Iranian Kurdish political activist

Afshin Sheikholeslami Vatani is an Iranian Kurdish political activist, a civil engineer, and environmentalist. Vatani is also a US resident who had immigrated to America in 2015. Vatani was first detained in 2003 by Intelligence Ministry officials in Sanandaj and sentenced to one year in prison for "propaganda against the state." He was captured again two years later and served the remainder of his sentence. On 17 February 2019, he was detained with his other co-members of the National Unity Party for “spreading propaganda against the Islamic Republic of Iran”. He was released on 5 billion Rial bail after one month of imprisonment.

On 19 March 2019, it was reported that Vatani and two other activists, Arman Vafaei and Fardin Karimi, were temporarily released until the trial on bail of 500 million tomans (about $120,000) each. Vatani has denied the charges conveyed against him. On 27 June 2020, he was arrested at his family's home in Sanandaj by the security forces linked with the Iranian Ministry of Intelligence. The Iranian Revolutionary Court confiscated his passport and banned him from leaving the country. Vatani is charged with disrupting public order and is a Kurdistan Free Life Party (PJAK) member, an armed Kurdish opposition group. On 31 July 2020, it was reported that Vatani has still not been charged by the Iranian judiciary 35 days after his arrest. His imprisonment has been extended by the Sanandaj prosecutor's office's second branch. On 20 September 2020, after over three months in detention, Vatani was released on 200 million Toman bail.

== See also ==
- List of foreign nationals detained in Iran
