= Abdolrasoul Dorri-Esfahani =

Iranian-Canadian accountant

- Born: Isfahan
- Education: Petroleum University of Technology
- Organization(s): Universal Health and Pharma Private Ltd.
- Title: Advisor to the Central Bank of the Islamic Republic of Iran
- Criminal charge: Espionage
- Criminal penalty: 5 years in prison
- Criminal status: Convicted
- Awards: Order of Merit and Management (3rd class)

Abdolrasoul Dorri-Esfahani (Persian: عبدالرسول دری اصفهانی) is an Iranian-Canadian accountant. He serves as an advisor to the Central Bank of the Islamic Republic of Iran and has been formerly a board member in privately owned corporations Asia Insurance and Saman Bank.

== Involvement in nuclear talks ==
Working under Hamid Baeidinejad, since late 2014 he was a member of Iranian team in the negotiations leading to the Joint Comprehensive Plan of Action.

== Espionage charge ==
In August 2016, principlist media outlets reported that he is charged with espionage, however the news are not confirmed. Abbas Jafari Dolatabadi, Prosecutor-General of Tehran said on 16 August 2016 that a dual citizen “active in the field of the Iranian economy” suspected to be linked to the Secret Intelligence Service has been arrested and released on bail but “the charge against him has not been proven yet”. It has been claimed that he had been paid by both Britain and the United States. Bahram Ghassemi, spokesman for Iran's Foreign Ministry has denied allegations and on 24 August 2016 an interview (quickly deleted without explanation) was published with Dorri-Esfahani in which he claimed he was not arrested.

In October 2017, Dorri-Esfahani was sentenced to five years of imprisonment for espionage.

== See also ==
- List of foreign nationals detained in Iran
