= Nosratollah Khosravi-Roodsari =

- Persian: نصرت الله خسروی رودسری
- Born: Nosratollah Khosravi-Roodsari

Nosratollah Khosravi-Roodsari (Persian: نصرت الله خسروی رودسری) is an Iranian-American who was freed during a prisoner exchange between the United States of America and Iran. In August 2013, Khosravi-Roodsari went to Iran to visit family. In May 2015, when attempting to get onto a flight to the United States, Koshravi was informed he couldn't leave the country and was taken into custody by the Iranian authorities. According to his lawyer, he was charged with espionage and sending secret information to a hostile government. He was imprisoned in Ward 409, Evin Prison, Tehran, Iran's Ministry of Intelligence controls.

== See also ==
- List of foreign nationals detained in Iran
- Human rights in the Islamic Republic of Iran
