= Erwin David Rabhan =

American businessman (1926–2024)

- Born: September 9, 1926; Savannah, Georgia, U.S.
- Died: November 12, 2024 (aged 98); Richmond, Virginia, U.S.
- Education: University of Georgia (BSc)
- Occupation: Businessman

Erwin David Rabhan (September 9, 1926 – November 12, 2024) was an American businessman from Savannah, Georgia.

== Biography ==
Rabhan was born to a prominent Iranian Jewish family on September 9, 1926, in Savannah, Georgia, where he grew up. In 1943, he graduated from Benedictine Military Academy in Savannah. In 1949, he graduated from University of Georgia with a Bachelor of Science degree in agriculture.

He was a longtime friend of former U.S. President Jimmy Carter and he served as the pilot for Carter's second campaign for governor of Georgia in 1970. Rabhan was imprisoned in Iran for nearly 11 years, from September 1979 to August 6, 1990. He was initially charged with breaking Iranian financial laws and then later charged with spying, though he was never officially charged. It was speculated that he was targeted due to his friendship with Carter. Rabhan described his lengthy prison experience as a "conscious coma... I feel like a real Rip van Winkle."

Rabhan arrived back in the U.S. on September 14, 1990, flying into Atlanta's Hartsfield Airport. Former President Carter greeted him there upon his arrival. Carter had advocated for his friend's release from imprisonment, and referred to him as a "hostage" of Iran. He privately asked the U.S. State Department to declare him a hostage, but that was never done.

Rabhan wrote about his experiences in the 2004 book Conscious Coma: Ten Years in an Iranian Prison.

Rabhan died in Richmond, Virginia on November 12, 2024, at the age of 98.

== See also ==
- List of foreign nationals detained in Iran

== Work ==
- Conscious Coma: Ten Years in an Iranian Prison, 2004 ISBN 1984529374, 978-1984529374
