= Matthew Trevithick =

American student arrested in Iran in 2015

Matthew Trevithick is an American student, writer and researcher.

His first book, which he helped author and edited, was written with the former Minister of Higher Education of Afghanistan, Dr. Sharif Fayez. The book details his life pursuing higher education in the United States and his time in the Afghan government rebuilding Afghanistan's higher education system after 2001. Ambassador Ryan Crocker wrote the book's foreword.

In 2015, he travelled to Iran to study Persian. On December 7, 2015, Trevithick was arrested by the Iranian authorities when trying to purchase a ticket back to the United States after his semester of intensive Persian study at Tehran University had concluded.

He was kept for 41 days in Evin Prison, Tehran. He was accused with conspiring against the Iranian government, having access to bank accounts containing millions of dollars, and knowing the location of weapons caches that had been planted around the country. When he denied these accusations, he was placed in solitary confinement for 29 days and threatened with violence repeatedly.

On January 16, 2016, Matthew was released. His release came the same day as a release of 4 other men, though he was released independently of the prisoner exchange between the United States and Iran and traveled home himself after being released.

His imprisonment had not been made public until then.

== See also ==
- List of foreign nationals detained in Iran
