= Detention of Craig and Lindsay Foreman =

Detainment of a British couple in Iran

Map of the world showing the location of Iran (green) and the United Kingdom (orange).

Craig and Lindsay Foreman are a British couple who were detained in Iran on charges of espionage in January 2025. On 19 February 2026, the Tehran Revolutionary Court sentenced them to 10 years in prison. As of 3 June 2026, they are still in prison.

Craig Foreman, a carpenter, and Dr Lindsay Foreman, a life coach with a doctorate in psychology, moved from the UK to Spain after Brexit. They appeared in episode 17 of series 7 of Channel 4's reality TV series A New Life in the Sun in 2022. In 2024, they set off to travel by motorcycle to Australia, where Dr Foreman was due to present at a conference on positive psychology in Brisbane in July 2025. She was reportedly carrying out her research project during their journey around the world, asking people what it means to be human and what constitutes a good life.

They entered Iran from Armenia on 30 December 2024, with plans to traverse the country and reach Pakistan by 4 January, despite official Foreign Office advice against all travel to Iran. While travelling across Iran, they were accompanied by a tour guide and were in possession of valid Iranian visas and an approved itinerary. They were detained on 3 January 2025. The news of their detention broke on 13 February 2025.

== Charges and detention in Iran ==
Iranian authorities allege that the Foremans had "gathered information in multiple provinces of the country" under the guise of tourism and research, which the Foremans have denied. The Iranian judiciary's news agency has claimed that the couple had been under surveillance by provincial intelligence agencies in Iran and that their connections with intelligence services of "hostile and Western nations" had been confirmed.

The Foremans were held in custody in Kerman, central Iran, until August 2025 when Craig Foreman was transferred to Evin prison, considered the country's harshest, and notorious for the abuse and torture of inmates. Their son Joe Bennett expressed his concern in an interview with Sky News in September 2025, saying the couple were locked in overcrowded cells with 50 other prisoners, in extreme heat and on metal bunks causing backaches. At that time no date had been set for any legal proceedings against them.

By the end of October 2025, the Foremans were held in separate wings at Evin prison and had appeared in court, with a court decision to be given at an undetermined date. They were not allowed to defend themselves at this court hearing. As of mid-November 2025, reports said the couple had begun a hunger strike in protest against the lack of progress in their case and loss of hope regarding their release.

On 2nd June 2026, their legal appeal was heard in court; the appeal was denied. They ended the hunger strike in mid-August 2026.

== Sentence ==
On 19 February 2026, the BBC reported that Iran's Revolutionary Court had sentenced the couple to 10 years in prison for espionage. Only hours before receiving the verdict, Dr Foreman had given a telephone interview to the BBC from Evin prison. She described the conditions there as "an endurance test for the mind," saying her time in jail had taken a physical toll on her. She said she and her husband had been patient with Iran's legal process and had believed their innocence would prevail, but saw now that this did not seem to be the case. She told the BBC that they had written to the Iranian authorities to complain about their treatment and had told them: "Even in your own system, your own judicial system, you're in violation of the laws." In July 2026, relatives of Craig Foreman said he has been informed that his punishment is now being extended by 2 years for talking to the media from his cell.

== UK response ==
After the Foremans' detention was made public in February 2025, the UK Foreign Office stated that they were providing consular assistance to them and remained in contact with local authorities. The couple's son has repeatedly expressed significant concern about their ongoing detention. He described the sentence as "gut-wrenching" and said he felt abandoned by the UK government, having repeatedly urged the Foreign Office to help his parents but not having received any replies to letters he had sent to the prime minister and the foreign secretary.

Foreign Secretary Yvette Cooper called the sentence "completely appalling and totally unjustifiable", adding that the Foreign Office would "pursue this case relentlessly with the Iranian government until we see Craig and Lindsay Foreman safely returned to the UK and reunited with their family."

In March 2026, Craig Foreman called on UK prime minister Keir Starmer to publicly state that he and his wife are innocent.

== Hostage diplomacy ==
Iran has detained foreign nationals on security-related charges on many occasions, a practice known as "hostage diplomacy", with detainees used as leverage in international relations. Advocates and former detainees urged the UK government to act swiftly to secure the Foremans' release, emphasizing the need for prompt and decisive action in such cases.

Ana Diamond, a British-Iranian dual-national and founder of the advocacy NGO Hostagesses Alliance, told Sky News shortly after the Foremans were detained that their arrest showed the West had failed to come up with a viable policy to counter Iran's hostage-taking practice.

== 2026 Iran war ==
As US-Israeli forces launched dozens of strikes against Iran since 28 February 2026, Evin prison is said to suffer damage due to the bombing around it. According to reports the couple is terrified inside the prison as bombs and explosions have been heard nearby.

== See also ==
- List of foreign nationals detained in Iran
