= Detention of Reza Valizadeh =

Detention of Iranian-American Journalist

Reza Valizadeh reporting for Radio Farda.

The detention of Reza Valizadeh is the Iranian government's ongoing incarceration of Reza Valizadeh (also known as Abdolreza Valizadeh), an Iranian-American journalist. The Iranian government has detained Valizadeh in Iran since September 2024, where he was sentenced in December 2024 to ten years in prison on charges of “collaborating with a hostile government.” In May 2025, the U.S. Department of State designated Valizadeh as wrongfully detained. Valizadeh's detention has received sustained coverage from international media outlets and press freedom organizations.

== Valizadeh's journalism career ==
Valizadeh began his journalism career in Iran. He was arrested in 2007 in connection with a blog post critical of then-President Mahmoud Ahmadinejad’s security team. Following the 2009 Iranian presidential election and the protests known as the Iranian Green Movement, he left Iran and later received asylum in France.

After leaving Iran, Valizadeh worked for international Persian-language media outlets, including Radio France Internationale, Voice of America Persian, and Radio Farda. His Iran-focused reporting for Radio Farda included stories on corruption, protests, and the Islamic Revolutionary Guard Corps.

== Arrest, trial, and sentencing ==
On March 6, 2024, Valizadeh returned to Iran for the first time since 2009 to visit his aging parents. He was arrested by the Islamic Revolutionary Guard Corps in Tehran on September 22, 2024. Following his arrest, Valizadeh was held in Evin prison without access to his lawyer. Iranian intelligence interrogated Valizadeh while he was detained and pressured him to cooperate against his former employer, Radio Farda. Valizadeh reportedly refused to cooperate.

On December 14, 2024, an Iranian court found Valizadeh guilty of “collaborating with a hostile government,” charges that stemmed from his work at a U.S.-funded radio outlet. The court sentenced Valizadeh to ten years in prison. Valizadeh’s sentence also included restrictions on his residence, travel, and political-party membership following his imprisonment. Valizadeh's attorneys have noted concerns about the fairness of his trial, including that the judge acted as both prosecutor and adjudicator for a trial lasting less than an hour. Valizadeh’s appeal of his conviction was denied in January 2025.

== Detention conditions and health ==
Valizadeh has been held primarily in Evin Prison in Tehran since his arrest, a facility commonly used to hold political prisoners and foreign detainees. During his imprisonment, Valizadeh has endured solitary confinement and repeated interrogation. He has suffered from deteriorating health conditions while imprisoned, including coughing, asthma-related breathing issues, persistent back pain, and dental problems. Conditions at Evin Prison, including unsanitary housing, polluted water, contaminated food, and inadequate medical treatment, have reportedly exacerbated Valizadeh’s health conditions.

Valizadeh was briefly transferred to Fashafouyeh Prison following Israeli airstrikes on Evin Prison in June 2025, before being returned to Evin Prison. Valizadeh’s family believes that the strike and Valizadeh’s subsequent transfer contributed to his worsening asthma.

== Public attention and advocacy on behalf of Valizadeh ==
Valizadeh’s detention has received coverage from Reuters, the Associated Press, CBS News, Fox News, the Washington Post, Al Jazeera, and Radio Free Europe/Radio Liberty. Press freedom organizations have also called attention to his case. The United States Department of State formally designated Valizadeh as “wrongfully detained” in May 2025, which authorizes the Special Presidential Envoy for Hostage Affairs to coordinate activities across the Executive Branch to seek Valizadeh’s release. On January 20, 2026, attorneys for Valizadeh filed a petition with the United Nations Working Group on Arbitrary Detention on his behalf.

In June 2026, CBS News published a recording in which Valizadeh, speaking from Evin Prison, requested medical assistance for himself and other detained Americans. In the recording, Valizadeh questioned why his and other Americans’ release had not been addressed in broader negotiations to end the 2026 Iran war. These concerns were echoed in a June 19, 2026 Washington Post opinion column by Valizadeh’s attorney.

== See also ==
- List of Americans wrongfully imprisoned or detained abroad
- List of foreign nationals detained in Iran
- Iran's hostage diplomacy
