= Benjamin Brière =

French tourist formerly imprisoned in Iran

Benjamin Brière (French pronunciation: [bɛ̃ʒamɛ̃ bʁijɛʁ]; born 1985 or 1986) is a French traveller and blogger who was arrested by the Iranian authorities in May 2020 after being accused of flying a drone near the border of Iran with Turkmenistan. After being held on charges of spying and propaganda, he was sentenced in January 2022 to eight years and eight months in prison. He was released in May 2023.

== Imprisonment ==
Brière is from Lyon. In 2018 he began a van trip, documented on Instagram, which had taken him through Finland, Turkey and Montenegro. In May 2020 he was in Iran, and after flying a Helicam in the desert near the Turkmenistan border, was arrested on 26 May by security forces on charges of photography in a prohibited area, use of a recreational drone in a natural park, and posting on social media questioning Iranian laws that mandate the hijab for women. He was placed in custody in Vakilabad prison in Mashhad, on a spying charge; on the first anniversary of his detention, in May 2021, a propaganda charge was added. His lawyer said that charges of alcoholism and "corruption on earth" had been dropped after investigation. In December 2021, after his case had still not been referred to a court and he had been denied permission to speak with his family at Christmas and New Year's, Brière began a hunger strike; in early January 2022, a demonstration in solidarity with him was held in the Place du Trocadéro in Paris.

On 25 January 2022, Brière was tried behind closed doors by the revolutionary court in Mashhad and sentenced to 8 years on the spying charge, with an additional 8 months on the propaganda charge. According to his lawyer, Brière had not been informed of an additional charge of "cooperation with states hostile to Iran", of which he was also found guilty. He was released on 12 May 2023, together with fellow French citizen Bernard Phelan.
