= Sakineh Mohammadi Ashtiani =

Iranian citizen sentenced to stoning (born 1967)

- سکینه محمدی آشتیانی
- Born: 1967–1968; Tabriz, Pahlavi Iran
- Criminal charges: Adultery, conspiracy to commit murder
- Criminal penalty: Death by stoning (commuted to ten years in prison)
- Criminal status: Released in 2014 after serving nine years

Sakineh Mohammadi Ashtiani (Persian: سکینه محمدی آشتیانی; born 1967) is an Iranian woman convicted of conspiracy to commit murder and adultery. She gained international notoriety for originally being sentenced to death by stoning for her crimes. Her sentence was commuted and she was released in 2014 after serving nine years on death row.

== Biography ==
Ashtiani is an Iranian Azeri born in Tabriz in 1347 (1967–1968) in the Persian calendar and grew up in the rural town of Osku, East Azerbaijan Province, Iran. Sakineh worked outside her home for two years as a kindergarten teacher.

== Arrest and conviction ==
Ashtiani was arrested in 2005 on charges of adultery and conspiracy to commit murder of her husband. In 2006, the court sentenced her to death by stoning after she was convicted. An international campaign to overturn her sentence was started by her children, Farideh and Sajjad Qaderzadeh, through a letter about their mother's case which was published by Mission Free Iran.

Prominent media sources picked up on the news via interviews with her son, which included information on her stoning sentence. The international publicity generated by Ashtiani's situation led to numerous diplomatic conflicts between Iran's government and the heads of certain western governments. As a result, her execution was stayed indefinitely. Shortly after the international campaign began, various Iranian officials stated that Ashtiani was also guilty of various charges related to the murder of her husband. The range of charges included murder, manslaughter, conspiracy, and complicity. However, major human rights organizations such as Amnesty International, some NGOs and her lawyers stated that Ashtiani was acquitted of murder, and that she initially received a 10-year sentence for complicity in murder and "disrupting the public order". The sentence was reduced to five years on appeal. She was convicted twice of adultery in separate trials and sentenced to death by stoning.

In December 2011, the Iranian authorities indicated that they intended to go ahead with her execution, but by hanging.

On 24 July 2012, Amnesty International stressed that Ashtiani's fate was still unclear, while her former lawyer Javid Houtan Kiyan languished in jail.

In March 2014, Ashtiani was pardoned for good behavior and released from prison.

== Legal proceedings ==
=== Original proceedings ===
In 2005, Ebrahim Qaderzadeh, Ashtiani's husband, aged 44, was murdered by electrocution by his cousin, Isa Taheri.

Ashtiani allegedly committed adultery with Isa Taheri, who murdered her husband, as well as a second unknown man. Taheri and Ashtiani were arrested as suspects, and according to some sources, Ashtiani was accused of committing adultery by the wife of one of her late husband's coworkers. On May 15, 2006 Sakineh entered a guilty plea of having had an "illicit relationship outside marriage" with another man (court records show it was not Taheri, but another person). The court handed down a punishment of 99 lashes; her son watched the whipping. In addition, she may have received one year in prison as well.

In his trial, Taheri was found guilty of murder and sentenced to death. Under Islamic law, murderers can be forgiven and pay restitution (diyya) to the victim's family, or the family can demand retribution (qisas) and have the murderer executed. Sajjad Qaderzadeh, Ashtiani's son, forgave Taheri, accepted blood money, and he was sentenced to 10 years in prison. According to some sources, he was later freed and is no longer in prison.

In September 2006, Ashtiani's murder case went to trial. She was not found guilty of the actual murder (since she did not physically kill her husband and the murderer was forgiven) but she was given 10 years in prison for complicity in murder and disrupting the public order, equal to Taheri's sentence. Upon appeal, this was later reduced to five years in prison. She was also brought to trial again for adultery. Her son, Sajjad Qaderzadeh, states that he was unaware of this new trial, and as she had been convicted for adultery previously, this new trial was "illegal". However, this trial may have been for adultery committed with Taheri, rather than a "second man", as records from her previous trial seem to indicate. This time, the court sentenced her to death, because of her alleged role in her husband's murder. Ashtiani recanted a previous confession and entered a plea of "not guilty". Out of the five ruling judges, three found her guilty; the other two indicated that although they do not doubt her guilt, since she had been previously convicted of adultery, she should not be punished again.

Due to the 3–2 majority vote, she was sentenced to death by stoning for adultery. Ashtiani may have had difficulty understanding the case because she speaks Azeri and not Persian. Malek Ejdar Sharifi, head of East Azerbaijan Province's judiciary said, "She was sentenced to capital punishment... for committing murder, manslaughter and adultery." However, according to advocacy group Mission Free Iran, this is contrary to the documentation on Ashtiani's case. Iran's Supreme Court confirmed her death sentence in 2007. Her appeal was denied, as was her request for clemency by the "Amnesty and Pardons Commission" of Iran.

=== Further developments ===
In mid-2010, Ashtiani became the subject of an international campaign, which may have prompted renewed developments in her case.

The Iranian Embassy in London issued the following statement:

"Considering the statements made by the Foreign Office Minister Alistair Burt on an Iranian national, Mrs Sakineh Mohammadi Ashtiani, and her execution, hereby this mission denies the false news aired in this respect and notifies the Ministry that according to information from the relevant judicial authorities in Iran, she will not be executed by stoning punishment."

By July 9, 2010, the Iranian government banned reporters in Iran from reporting on any details of the case. One of her lawyers, Mohammed Mostafaei, fled the country when he was charged with "financial fraud". Mostafaei stated that he was being harassed for defending his client, Sakineh Mohammadi Ashtiani, as well as other clients. Mostafaei sought asylum internationally, first in Turkey, and then Norway, where he was reunited with his family on September 2, 2010.

On August 4, 2010, the Iranian authorities told Ashtiani's new lawyer, Houtan Kian, that she faced death by hanging. On the same day, Tehran's High Court rejected a reopening of the trial and instead considered the Tabriz prosecutor's demand to execute Ashtiani. Her case was subsequently transferred to the deputy prosecutor-general Saeed Mortazavi. Ashtiani's son was told that the file on his father's murder case had been lost. Her son stated, "they are lying about the charges against my mother. She was acquitted of murdering my father but now the government is building up their own story against her." Her son's statement was contradicted by numerous Iranian news accounts describing her as being convicted of both complicity in murder and adultery, although those reports may not be accurate.

On August 12, 2010, Ashtiani was televised from Tabriz prison on an Iranian state-run television program which showed her confessing in native Azerbaijani language to adultery and involvement with the murder of her husband once again. Her lawyer alleged she had been tortured for two days prior to the interview.

On August 28, Ashtiani was given 24-hour notice that she was to be hanged at dawn the next day. She wrote her last will and testament just before the call to morning prayer at 4:00 AM local time, when she expected to be led to the gallows at Tabriz Prison. However, the sentence was stayed. It may have been a mock execution.

=== Suspension of the stoning sentence ===
On September 8, 2010, Ramin Mehmanparast, a spokesman for Iran's Foreign Ministry, confirmed that the government had suspended the stoning sentence, pending a review of her husband's murder case. Mehmanparast added that she was guilty of both adultery and murder and that her case was undeserving of the international attention it has drawn. He said that releasing murderers should not be made into a human rights issue and called on countries criticizing Iran to release all their murderers as well. According to the human rights organization Iran Human Rights, Ashtiani remained in danger of capital punishment by hanging.

Iran Human Rights also expressed concerns over Mehmanparast's statement about "Sakineh's murder charge being investigated for the final verdict". Commenting on this statement, the spokesperson of Iran Human Rights, Mahmood Amiry-Moghaddam, says: "The fact that the authorities are mentioning murder charges now could mean that Ashtiani is in danger of being sentenced to death for murder".

Her lawyer, Houtan Kian, was arrested in October 2010. Her son was also arrested in October 2010, after speaking to two German reporters who had entered the country on tourist visas. He was released on $40,000 bail in December. On January 1, 2011, he was shown on television admitting he did not doubt his mother was guilty, but urged Iranian authorities to let her live. He also said it was unfair that Isa Taheri was free. But Press TV reports that, according to the Human Rights Headquarters of the Iranian Judiciary, the deceased husband's "next of kin waived their right to retribution"; as a consequence, Taheri has been handed down a 10-year discretionary jail term.

== International campaign ==
Ashtiani's two children began a campaign to overturn their mother's conviction. In June 2010, they wrote a letter to the world asking for help to save their mother, which was first published on June 26, 2010, by Mission Free Iran's International Committee against Stoning. The letter brought widespread attention in 2010 as a result of grassroots campaigning through social networking sites that led to the letter's being passed along to mainstream mass media.

During July 2010, protests occurred in Rome, London and Washington, D.C., among other cities. Calls to stop her execution came from leading human rights groups Avaaz, Amnesty International and Human Rights Watch as well as from several high-profile celebrities. A petition was created in support of her release, and was signed by several additional prominent activists.

On July 31, 2010, the president of Brazil, Luiz Inácio Lula da Silva, said he would ask the Iranian president, Mahmoud Ahmadinejad, to send Mrs. Ashtiani to Brazil, where she would be granted asylum. According to the Brazilian Foreign Ministry, the Brazilian ambassador in Tehran was directly instructed to communicate their asylum proposal to the Iranian government. Iranian officials responded by suggesting that Lula had "not received enough information about the case". U.S. Secretary of State Hillary Clinton mentioned Mrs. Ashtiani in a declaration on August 10, 2010, urging Iran to respect the fundamental freedoms of its citizens.

In late August 2010, the Iranian newspaper Kayhan called Carla Bruni-Sarkozy, the First Lady of France, a "prostitute" who "deserved death" after she condemned the stoning sentence against Mrs. Ashtiani. Iranian officials condemned this statement and Ahmadinejad condemned Kayhan's comments toward Mrs. Bruni-Sarkozy's as a "crime" and "against Islam" .

A resolution by the European Parliament on September 8, 2010, declared that "a sentence of death by stoning can never be justified." The vote passed by a margin of 658–1, the sole vote against having been made in error and later rectified, according to the Associated Press. On September 29, 2010, EveryOne Group, a human rights organisation based in Italy, appealed to the Iranian Authorities for an act of compassion for Mrs. Ashtiani. The international human rights campaign for her release, however, was criticized for being sexist because a study showed that this campaign totally left her male accomplice to his fate despite the fact that both of them were involved in the same crime and received the same verdict.

== 2014 release ==
In March 2014, Mohammad-Javad Larijani, the Islamic regime's Secretary General for Human Rights, announced that Sakineh Ashtiani had been pardoned, due to good behaviour. She had spent nine years on death row. Larijani stated that the media attention surrounding her sentence to death by stoning was "propaganda" and that the death sentence she had initially received was for the murder of her husband and not adultery.

== See also ==
- Marcus Hellwig
- Mina Ahadi
- Marina Nemat
- Capital punishment in Iran
- The Stoning of Soraya M. (film)
- Rajm
