= Iran–United States relations during the Biden administration =

Iran–United States relations

- Iran: United States

Diplomatic mission
- Interests Section in the Pakistani Embassy, Washington, D.C.: Interests Section in the Swiss Embassy, Tehran

Envoy
- Director of the Interest Section Mehdi Atefat: United States Special Representative for Iran Abram Paley

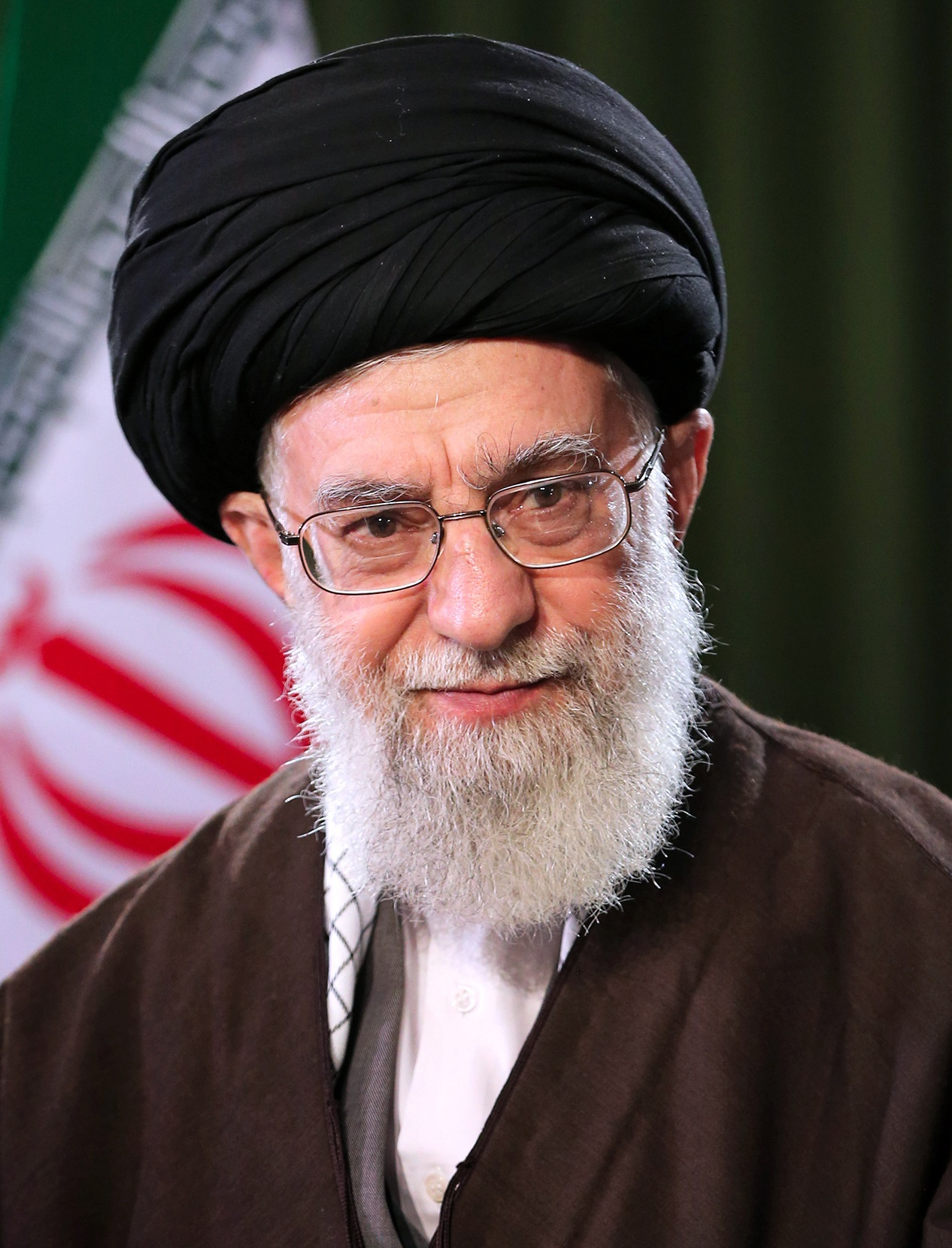
Ali Khamenei

Joe Biden

Relations between Iran and the United States during Joe Biden's term as the president of the United States (2021–2025) were shaped by efforts to revive the 2015 nuclear agreement alongside ongoing regional tensions, sanctions, cyberattacks, and proxy conflicts. Early in Biden's presidency, U.S. officials expressed interest in returning to the Joint Comprehensive Plan of Action (JCPOA), but negotiations in Vienna eventually stalled. Iran increased uranium enrichment and imposed retaliatory sanctions, while the U.S. imposed new sanctions over missile programs, oil exports, and human rights abuses.

Tensions persisted throughout this era, marked by recurring proxy attacks on U.S. bases, which intensified following the outbreak of the Gaza war in late 2023, and by subsequent American retaliatory strikes. The period also saw disputes over the assassination of Qasem Soleimani, and military escalations across the Gulf region. In 2023, a breakthrough occurred with a U.S.–Iran prisoner swap and the release of frozen Iranian funds, though indirect diplomacy remained fragile. Iran was later accused of interfering in the 2024 U.S. presidential election through cyber operations and AI disinformation. Alleged assassination plots targeting Donald Trump and dissidents on U.S. soil further strained relations. By late 2024, relations remained adversarial, marked by unresolved security disputes and growing mistrust.

== State of Iran-U.S. relations in January 2021 ==
At the outset of the Biden administration in January 2021, Iran was led by President Hassan Rouhani, a centrist cleric who had previously championed the 2015 nuclear deal (JCPOA) and advocated for improved relations with the West, while ultimate authority rested with Supreme Leader Ali Khamenei, who held decisive power over Iran’s foreign and security policies. Relations between the U.S. and Iran were deeply strained, with no formal diplomatic ties since 1980. The United States had withdrawn from the JCPOA, reimposed sweeping sanctions, and escalated military tensions, while Iran had resumed higher-level uranium enrichment and reduced compliance with the nuclear deal in violation of the agreement.

== Early diplomatic positions and regional tensions ==
The Biden administration initially expressed interest in re-engaging with Iran on the Iran nuclear deal, which the previous administration had withdrawn from in 2018, sparking international backlash. Early in his presidency, Biden formally extended an offer to restart diplomatic talks on a new nuclear deal, with Secretary of State Antony Blinken indicated that the U.S. would consider re-entering the agreement if Iran returned to "strict compliance" with its terms. At the time, Blinken also did not rule out the possibility of military intervention to prevent Iran from obtaining nuclear weapons.

As Iran continued to struggle with the COVID-19 pandemic in early 2021, the government repeatedly urged the Biden administration to lift sanctions. Strict financial measures imposed by the previous Trump administration had negatively impacted Iranian economies.

Tensions remained high in the region. Following a militia-organized rocket attack in Erbil, Iraq, which wounded four American contractors and one soldier, in February 2021 the United States Military conducted airstrikes on Iran-backed militias in Syria, including Kata'ib Hezbollah. The attacks sparked renewed debate over presidential war powers, with key Democratic lawmakers expressing concern about conducting military operations without prior congressional approval.

== Nuclear negotiations begin ==
Over 220 US Congress leaders endorsed House Resolution 118 in April 2021, expressing support for "the Iranian people's desire for a democratic, secular, and non-nuclear republic of Iran" and condemning "violations of human rights and state-sponsored terrorism". Around the same time, signatories of the Joint Comprehensive Plan of Action (JCPOA) met in Vienna in an effort to bring both the United States and Iran back into compliance with the nuclear agreement. U.S. and Iranian officials participated in so-called proximity talks in order to exchange views on how to return to the considered deal. Both sides downplayed expectations for rapid progress, insisting that the other should resume their commitments first. Talks continued even after an explosion at Iran's Natanz nuclear facility, blamed on Israel, to which Iran responded by increasing uranium enrichment to 60% purity, its highest level to date.

Diplomatic tensions remained unresolved in late 2021, with U.S. Secretary of State Antony Blinken stating that military intervention to prevent Iran from obtaining nuclear weapons could not be ruled out. Around the same time, Iran imposed sanctions on former U.S. President Donald Trump, Secretary of State Mike Pompeo, and eight others for their alleged roles in the 2020 killing of Major General Qasem Soleimani. Iran also requested their arrest through Interpol. President Ebrahim Raisi stated that Trump, Pompeo, and others must be tried in a "fair court".

== 2021 U.S.–Iran naval incident ==
In 2021, Iran's crude oil exports had been re-imposed sanctions by the United States after Trump's withdrawal from the JCPOA. Iran's Islamic Revolutionary Guard Corps stated on 25 October 2021 that they had thwarted an attempt by the United States to capture and detain a tanker carrying Iranian oil in the gulf of Oman by carrying out a heliborne operation and directing the ship back to Iran's territorial waters. The Pentagon rejected the Iranian statement and said that Iranian forces had seized a Vietnamese-flagged oil tanker in October.

It was later confirmed by the Vietnam officials that Iran had captured their oil tanker MV Sothys. After talks with the Iranian authorities, MV Sothys was released from the Bandar Abbas port on 11 November 2021 without "its original batch of oil." The IRGC public relations department said the release had been under warrant. IRGC released an official footage showing the tanker seizing operation.

== Regional cooperation and missile strikes ==
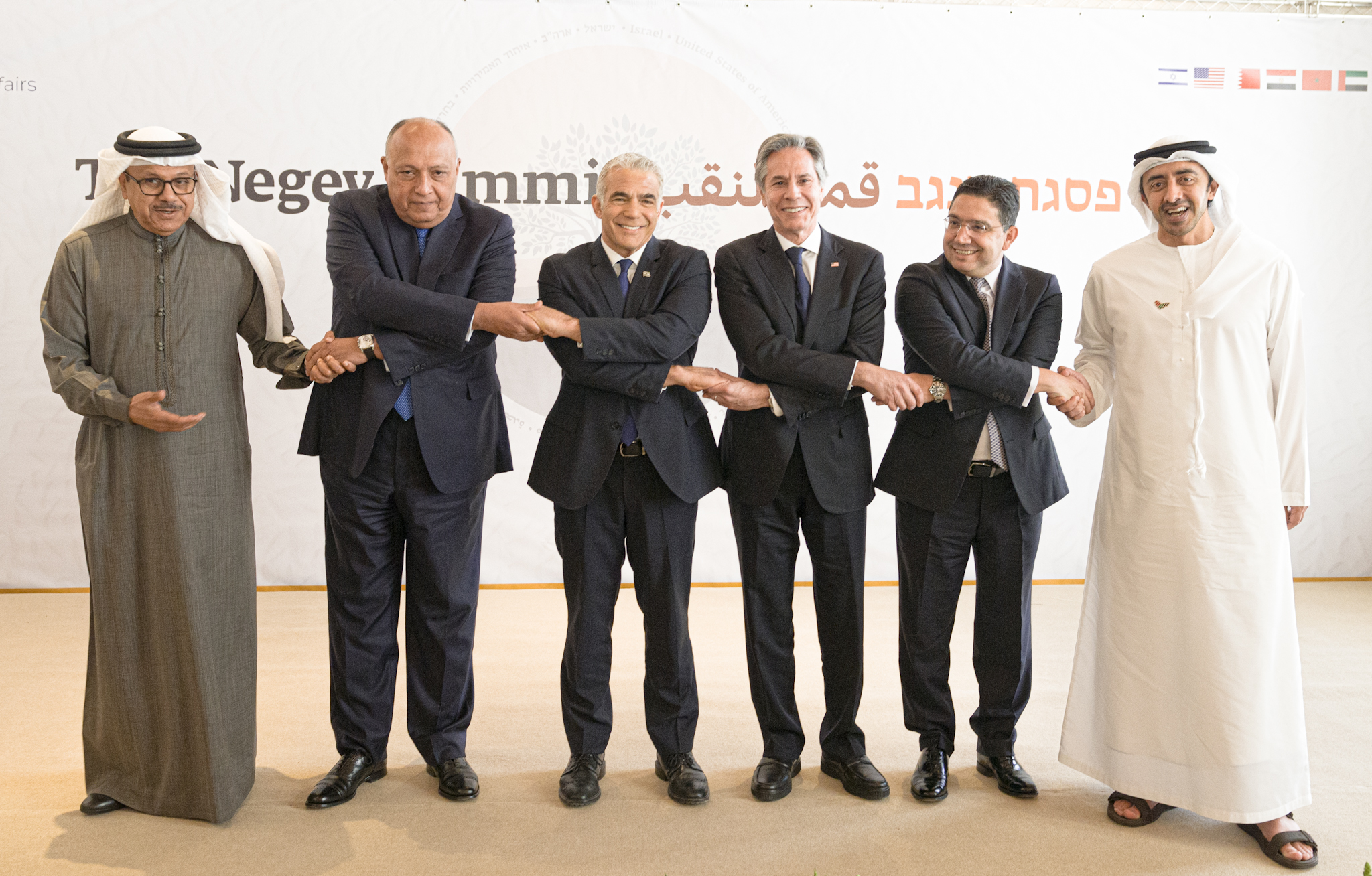
Secretary of State Antony J. Blinken participates in the Negev Summit with Israeli Foreign Minister Yair Lapid, Bahraini Foreign Minister Dr. Abdullatif bin Rashid Al Zayani, Egyptian Foreign Minister Sameh Shoukry, Moroccan Foreign Minister Nasser Bourita, and UAE Foreign Minister Sheikh Abdullah bin Zayed Al Nahyan on March 28, 2022 in Sde Boker, Israel.

To bolster regional coordination, the United States, Israel, Bahrain, Egypt, Morocco, and the United Arab Emirates (UAE) established the Negev Summit in March 2022. Its objective was to deter Iran, as well as to pursue other objectives not connected to defense. Clandestinely, the United States convened military officers from Bahrain, Egypt, Israel, Jordan, Qatar, Saudi Arabia, and the UAE in the same month to discuss and tackle Iran's drone and missile capabilities. Just days later, Iran launched a dozen ballistic missiles toward Erbil, the capital of Iraq's autonomous Kurdish region. It was an unprecedented strike that appeared to be aimed at U.S. interests and their allies. General Frank McKenzie, the departing CENTCOM head, testified before the U.S. Senate Armed Services committee that Iraq remained the most vulnerable point for the United States in the Middle East. He expressed growing concern over Iran's advancing ballistic missile program, long-range drones, and expanding arsenal, all of which posed significant threats to regional stability.
In January 2022, as part of its response to Soleimani's assassination, Iran imposed sanctions on 52 U.S. officials, many of them military figures. Among those targeted were Chairman of the Joint Chiefs of Staff Mark Milley, CENTCOM chief Kenneth McKenzie, Pentagon officials, and commanders at various U.S. bases in the region.

== Stalled negotiations and diplomatic pressure ==
Iran's Foreign Minister Hossein Amirabdollahian stated that a short-term resurrection of a 2015 nuclear deal remained possible if the US demonstrated pragmatism in the Vienna negotiations, which had been ongoing for nearly a year. Echoing that sentiment, White House National Security Adviser Jake Sullivan affirmed that the United States was still pursuing a diplomatic resolution to Iran's nuclear ambitions. However, he warned that if diplomacy failed, Washington would work with international partners to intensify pressure on Iran. Secretary of State Antony Blinken also emphasized U.S. commitment to preventing Iran from acquiring a nuclear weapon. He noted that the United States would work closely with Israel toward that goal, despite ongoing disagreements between the two countries regarding Iran's nuclear program.

Following a series of missile attacks attributed to Iran-backed proxies against countries in the region, the United States imposed sanctions on an Iranian procurement agent and his affiliated companies, accusing them of supporting Iran's ballistic missile program. Iranian Foreign Ministry spokesperson Saeed Khatibzadeh accused the United States of continuing to violate a United Nations resolution that affirmed the 2015 nuclear agreement, despite American claims to the contrary.

== Collapse of talks and retaliatory sanctions ==
By early April 2022, negotiations in Vienna aimed at restoring the 2015 nuclear deal had stalled, with no breakthrough after months of indirect talks. In response, an Iranian foreign ministry spokeswoman accused the United States of causing the impasse. Days later, Iran imposed sanctions on 15 additional U.S. officials, including former Army Chief of Staff George Casey and former President Donald Trump's attorney Rudy Giuliani. Iranian President Ebrahim Raisi reaffirmed Iran's right to develop its nuclear industry for peaceful purposes and called on all parties involved in the negotiations to respect that right. Around the same time, Iranian Foreign Minister Hossein Amirabdollahian stated that U.S. President Joe Biden should lift certain sanctions as a sign of good faith toward restarting the nuclear agreement.

== Soleimani-related threats and diplomatic impasse ==
Tensions deepened in April 2022 when a senior commander in Iran's Revolutionary Guards declared that even the assassination of all American leaders would not be sufficient to avenge the U.S. killing of Qassem Soleimani, who was commander of the Quds Force at the time of his death in 2020. About a week later, a senior Iranian figure warned that Iran would not abandon plans to avenge Soleimani's death, despite what Iranian officials described as "frequent proposals" from the U.S. to ease sanctions and offer concessions. The United States stated that if Iran sought sanctions relief beyond the terms of the 2015 deal, such as the delisting of the Revolutionary Guards as a terrorist organization, it would also need to address American concerns that go extending the nuclear issue.

== Shift in U.S. position and continued sanctions ==
By May 2022, the United States signaled that it was prepared for either outcome: a return to mutual compliance with the 2015 nuclear deal or a continued absence of agreement. The same month the U.S. imposed sanctions on Iran's Revolutionary Guards' Quds Force, accusing it of participating in a Russian-backed oil smuggling and money laundering network. Additional sanctions followed in June, targeting Chinese and Emirati companies, as well as a network of Iranian firms, accused of facilitating the sale of Iranian petrochemicals. The action aimed to pressure Tehran to return to the 2015 nuclear deal.

Efforts to resolve the diplomatic impasse continued. At the end of June, EU envoy Enrique Mora tweeted that indirect talks between Tehran and Washington in Qatar had concluded without the progress the European team had hoped for. Meanwhile, U.S. sanctions expanded. In early July, a second round targeted additional Chinese, Emirati, and other companies allegedly involved in the delivery and sale of Iranian oil and petrochemicals to East Asia.

== Arab–Israeli alliance and Iranian backlash ==
Plans for a U.S.-supported Arab–Israeli alliance, primarily aimed at deterring Iran's political and military ambitions, became public in July. Iran responded by warning that such an alliance would only heighten regional tensions. Days later, Iranian Foreign Ministry spokesperson Nasser Kanaani stated that peace and stability in the Middle East would remain elusive so long as Washington prioritized the security of what he called "the fake state of Israel." In a further escalation, Iran announced sanctions against 61 additional Americans, including former Secretary of State Mike Pompeo, for their support of an Iranian dissident group.

== Assassination plots ==
In August 2022, the U.S. Department of Justice charged Shahram Poursafi, a member of Iran’s Islamic Revolutionary Guard Corps (IRGC), with plotting to assassinate former National Security Advisor John Bolton. Poursafi allegedly attempted to hire individuals in the U.S. to carry out the assassination, offering $300,000 for the task. The plot was uncovered when a potential recruit became a confidential source for U.S. investigators, leading to the foiling of the plan. Former Secretary of State Mike Pompeo was also identified as a target in the same assassination scheme. Court documents revealed that Poursafi had earmarked $1 million for Pompeo's assassination.

== Disclosure and escalations ==
In June 2023, CNN reported a tape of former President Donald Trump discussing and appearing to show off classified documents pertaining to a hypothetical plan for the U.S. to invade Iran. The comments were made in the presence of two Trump aides and a writer and publisher working on former White House Chief of Staff Mark Meadows' memoir. The tape was cited in Trump's federal indictment.

A series of incidents in mid-2023 drew attention to maritime security in the region. In July, the U.S. Naval Forces Central Command reported that it had prevented Iran from seizing two commercial tankers in the region. The following month, around 3,000 U.S. military personnel were deployed to the Red Sea in response to Iran's seizure of several civilian ships. Iran condemned the deployment, characterizing it as a source of regional instability.

== September 2023 prisoner release deal ==
Iran claimed in March 2023 that a prisoner swap agreement was made between Iran and the United States, though the U.S. denied it at the time. In August 2023, the United States and Iran reached a tentative agreement to exchange five American prisoners held in Iran for five Iranians detained in the U.S., alongside the release of approximately $6 billion in frozen Iranian oil funds held in South Korea. The funds were transferred to Qatar, with the understanding that they would be used solely for humanitarian purposes. The deal, finalized in early September after months of indirect negotiations, marked the first significant diplomatic breakthrough between the two countries since the U.S. withdrawal from the JCPOA by the Trump administration in 2018. Upon release of the five detainees from Iranian prisons, Secretary Antony Blinken commented in a press statement. "It's easy in the work that we do every day sometimes to get lost in the abstractions of foreign policy and relations with other countries, and forgetting the human element that's at the heart of everything we do." He also thanked his political partners during the challenging negotiations, particularly in Oman, Switzerland, Qatar and the United Kingdom.

The prisoners were released and transferred on September 18 and 19, 2023. The five Iranian-Americans released by Iran were Siamak Namazi, Emad Shargi, Morad Tahbaz and two who were not identified. The five released in the U.S. were Mehrdad Moin-Ansari, Kambiz Attar-Kashani, Reza Sarhangpour-Kafrani, Amin Hassanzadeh, and Kaveh L. Afrasiabi who had been arrested in early 2021 by the FBI and charged with acting and conspiring to act as an unregistered agent of Iran. Two of them would return to Iran, one would join his family in another country, and two would remain in the U.S. at their request.

== Iranian influence in Iraq ==
In June 2024, U.S. Representative Mike Waltz publicly identified Iraq's Chief Justice Faiq Zaidan as an agent under Iranian control, advancing Tehran's agenda within Iraq, and introduced a legislative amendment to officially label him as a tool of Iranian influence. Waltz accused Zaidan of playing a pivotal role in Iran's strategy to transform Iraq into a client state exploited for terrorism, warning that Iraq risks falling under Iran's domination. The U.S. State Department echoed these concerns, emphasizing that Iran's interference threatens Iraq's democratic institutions, national stability, and security.

The allegations against Faiq Zaidan as an Iranian-controlled asset stem from his longstanding defense of Iran-backed militias and allies. Notably, Zaidan refused to convict Iran-backed forces responsible for the killing of 800 Iraqi protesters in 2019, and played a key role in dissolving a corruption investigation committee targeting pro-Iranian officials in 2022. Furthermore, Zaidan overturned the last elections in Iraq and required the government to be fully run by Iran-backed actors.

== Proxy warfare and regional confrontations ==
Following the start of the Gaza war in October 2023, Iran-backed militias conducted a series of attacks on US bases in the Middle East in response for the US's support of Israel. These attacks resulted in injuries to dozens of US service members. In retaliation, the US launched multiple counterattacks, resulting in the death of about 65 militants.

In November 2023, Iranian Supreme Leader Ali Khamenei stated in a speech that the US has failed to accomplish its goal of creating "a New Middle East" and achieve its political objectives in the region. He said: "US plans for forming 'a New Middle East' have failed: They planned to eliminate Hezbollah, but it's 10 times stronger now. They failed to devour Iraq and Syria, and they failed to settle the Palestinian dispute for the benefit of the usurper regime [Israel] using a devious '2-state' solution." He added that Operation "Al-Aqsa Flood" led by Hamas was a "historic event" that aimed to achieve "de-Americanization" of the region. He also expressed hope for the "elimination" of US influence in the region.

In early February 2024, militia attacks against US forces were halted.

Meanwhile, proxy warfare between the two intensified throughout the 2020s, after Iran began backing Russia with weaponry amidst the latter's invasion of Ukraine, which has led to Ukrainian condemnation. The United States has provided aid for Ukraine on the other hand. During the Gaza war, both Iran and the United States supported opposite sides, with Iran allegedly helping plan the Hamas incursion into Israel while the U.S. has backed Israel.

== 2024 United States presidential election ==
In August 2024, American presidential candidate Donald Trump attributed the hacking of his election campaign to Iran. His campaign team issued a statement claiming that the "Iranian government has stolen and distributed sensitive internal documents". The charge followed Microsoft's report that detailed foreign attempts to interfere in this year's presidential election. A spokesman for the National Security Council said it takes any report of foreign interference "extremely seriously" and condemns any attempt to undermine U.S. democratic institutions. Iran's Permanent Mission to the United Nations in New York announced in an email that "the Iranian government has neither the intention nor the motivation to interfere in the American presidential election, nor does it have it in mind."

In September 2024, U.S. agencies claim Iranian hackers sent stolen Trump campaign material to individuals linked to Biden's re-election team, aiming to disrupt the U.S. election. While Iran denies the allegations, officials assert this is part of broader efforts to undermine electoral confidence.

Iran's Foreign Ministry rejected a U.S. Homeland Security report from October 2, 2024, that accused Iran of using AI to meddle in U.S. elections, labeling the allegations as unfounded and politically motivated. The U.S. report warned that Iran, China, and Russia might use AI to sow division ahead of the November elections.

In November 2024, the US Justice Department revealed that the Iranian government had hired a man to survey and kill US President-elect Donald Trump. Iranian American journalist Masih Alinejad was also targeted. The Iranian efforts were described by the Justice Department as "ongoing efforts by Iran to target U.S. government officials, including Trump, on U.S. soil". The director of the FBI said Iran was targeting leaders and dissidents who criticized the Iranian government.

In his first meeting with Trump, Joe Biden called Iran the most immediate threat. According to The Wall Street Journal, Iranian regime gave the United States written assurance it would not try to assassinate President Donald Trump.

Trump ally Elon Musk reportedly met with Iran's Ambassador to the U.N. and "discussed ways to defuse tensions". Iran officially denied claims of a secret meeting between Musk and its UN envoy.

An Iranian Board of Directors of the Islamic Consultative Assembly member called establishing nuclear deterrent against Trump and Israel essential.

== See also ==
- Foreign relations of Iran
- Foreign policy of the Biden administration
- Iran–United States relations during the George W. Bush administration
- Iran–United States relations during the Obama administration
- Iran–United States relations during the first Trump administration
- Iran–United States relations during the second Trump administration
- Views on military action against Iran
