= Arrest of Jolie King and Mark Firkin =

Australian travel bloggers arrested in Iran

Jolie King, a British Australian, and Mark Firkin, an Australian, are a couple living in Perth, Australia. Online travel bloggers who have documented their experiences on social media since 2017, they are best known for being arrested in Iran in July 2019.

== History ==
=== Before ===
The pair left Perth in July 2017 in a Toyota Land Cruiser bound for the UK, as they both planned a long-time travel for two years driving across 36 countries.

King and Firkin ran a YouTube channel called The Way Overland, as well as Facebook and Instagram along with their own website. King and Firkin had frequently used a drone in photos and videos published of their travels through Australia, Asia and the Middle East, with nearly 19,000 people, now currently 36,500+ following their adventures on their Instagram page. A month before their arrest, their last video was posted in June 2019 about driving through Pakistan.

=== Arrest ===
In July 2019, King and Firkin were arrested at gunpoint for flying a drone near military installations "without a license" in Tehran province, according to a Persian broadcaster Manato TV on Twitter. It was stated by the couple that they wanted to use the drone to capture footage up high for their travelling blogs. The couple were charged with espionage, a capital offense in Iran. The couple were denied access to lawyers or to Australian consular officers. Further mentioned by King, both her and Firin had been sent to the judge along with their interrogators acting as their translators due to during that time, they hadn't gotten access to a lawyer yet. The judge concluded with a statement that the charges for espionage - which was worth 10 years of sentence to a maximum penalty of death - had been dropped, but the couple were still being charged with taking pictures of an atomic site, which sent them in between to 6 months to 3 years in jail. On 12 September 2019, Australian foreign affairs minister, Senator Marise Payne, began negotiations for their release during a meeting with the Iranian government, Foreign Minister Mohammad Javad Zarif (2013–2021) in Bangladesh. With King being a dual Australian British citizen, the UK government; British Foreign Secretary Dominic Raab, with the Australians', demanded the couple's release. In addition, involving the UK as they were in similar boats with Australia with not being their first time having their citizen had been detained overseas. A British woman by the name of Nazanin Zaghari-Ratcliffe, who was detained in Iran from 3 April 2018 and had gone through multiple charges from plotting against the Iranian government to propaganda activities, until she was finally released on 16 March 2022. Knowing the situation, Payne stated that negotiations for their release had taken major consideration in securing their release to ensure they were treated appropriately while detained. Due to King and Firin were not the only foreigners that had been arrested, the government were also working to secure the release of another British Australian, who had been detained from 18 September to 20 November - Dr Kylie Moore-Gilbert, a Middle East expert at the University of Melbourne's Asia Institute, specialising in Arab states of the Persian Gulf. She had originally been sentenced to 10 years in jail, until she was released as part of prisoner swap arrangement for three Iranian prisoners in Thailand, with two of whom had been convicted in connection with the 2012 Bangkok bomb plot. Raab had raised grim concerns that there may have been more unheard-of dual national citizens detained by Iran and their conditions while in custody or jail. The couple were held in Tehran's Evin prison, the same area Moore-Gilbert was detained which is notorious for imprisoning political figures.

=== Release ===
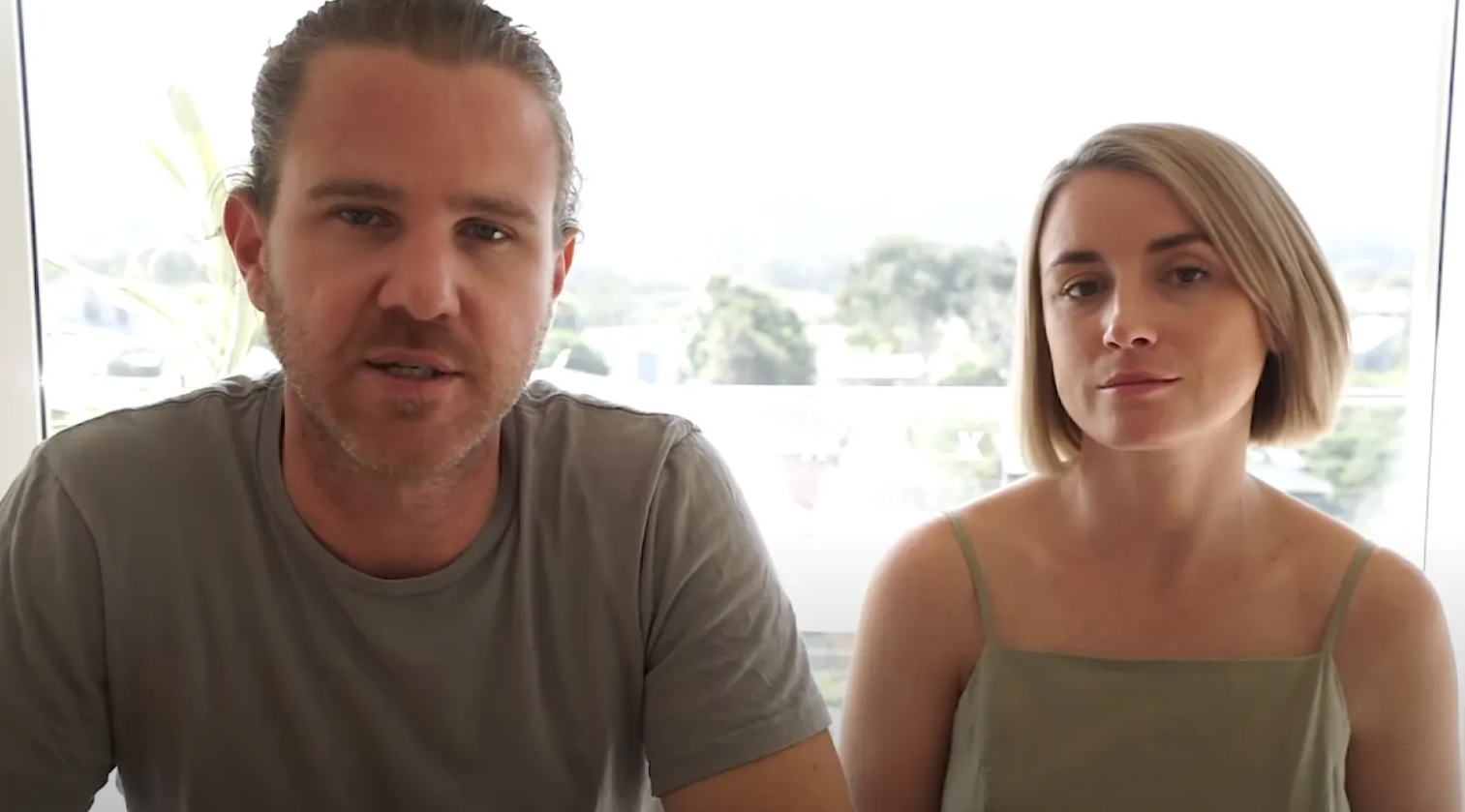
The couple shared their experiences in Tehran's prison after their releases

On 5 October 2019, charges against King and Firkin were dropped and released in exchange for a prisoner swap with a 38-year-old University of Queensland research student who was in custody at Queensland Corrective Services for 13 months, Reza Dehbashi Kivi, an Iranian was arrested in September 2018, charged with 20 years and had been wanted by the US authorities for conspiring to export military electronic devices to Iran. Despite being ruled eligible by a magistrate, Attorney-General Christian Porter (2017–2021) issued Debashi Kivi would not be extradited to the US. Thus, the student was no longer in custody and had been returned to Iran, Tehran. According to Payne and the couple themselves who did break silence after being released, King and Firkin were in good health and spirits after 3 months of detainment. The couple then requested privacy and wished to not discuss further, return to their loved ones, and continue pursuing their hobbies. Further stated by Payne, the government had worked hard and discreetly through diplomatic channels to ensure their charges be dropped along with proper treatment and care. While the couple have been discharged early and are confirmed to be the third Australian detainees in Iran, each case of an Australian along with every other possible citizen from other countries detained overseas will be different, hence Payne has now advised every Australian that any travel plan to Iran is best to reconsider, as it is known to have the highest warning level in prohibiting travellers applied in some parts of the country.

After their release, the couple returned to Australia, welcomed by both their families along with Australian Prime Minister Scott Morrison (2018–2022). Firkin affirmed he and King were working getting themselves started anew and paying off their significant legal bills. As of now, the couple has been remained active in YouTube, Facebook and their own website.
