= Marcus Hellwig =

German journalist (born 1965)

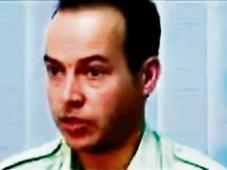
Marcus Hellwig

Marcus Hellwig (born 26 November 1965 in Wuppertal) is a German journalist working for the weekly BILD am Sonntag. In October 2010, he and his partner Jens Koch were arrested in Iran after trying to interview death row prisoner Sakineh Ashtiani’s son. He was held in prison for nearly five months.

== Iranian interview case ==
=== Arrest ===
One day before their arrest, Hellwig and Koch had entered Iran on tourist visas, planning to investigate the case of Sakineh Ashtiani, who had been sentenced to death by stoning for adultery. Without the permission of Iranian authorities and in violation of Iranian media law, they arranged to meet Ashtiani's lawyer and her son, Sadjad Qaderzadeh, for an interview, which was held in Tabriz in the northwestern region of Iranian Azerbaijan. After only a few questions, Iranian authorities intervened and arrested Hellwig and Koch as well as Ashtiani's lawyer and her son.

=== Charges by Iranian judiciary ===
Hellwig and Koch were suspected of having planned the operation with Mina Ahadi who was engaged via a regular telephone connection in the interview and served as a translator for the two Germans. Ahadi was convicted for terrorism in Iran for her past involvement with the Kurdish Komalah forces. Cooperation with her was considered an act against the national security of Iran by the judiciary. The two were sentenced to 20 months in prison on charges on “acting against national security” by "committing unspecified acts".

On 1 January 2011 Sakineh Ashtiani announced in a press conference that she intended to sue the two German journalist for illegally interviewing her son about her case.

=== Release ===
The two journalists were freed on 20 February 2011 and their sentences commuted to fines of $50,000 each. after a visit by German Foreign Minister Guido Westerwelle to Tehran for a rare meeting with Iranian President Mahmoud Ahmadinejad. Westerwelle returned to Germany with the pair on his government plane.

A year after being released, Hellwig told readers of his tabloid that he "was regularly beaten and constantly interrogated" during the first 10 “brutal” days in captivity until a German diplomat intervened on their behalf. Iranian interrogators sometimes "claimed that I was a spy, then allegedly a terrorist,” he said. According to Hellwig, he and Koch could hear torture victims throughout the day from their prison cell. “The cries were horrible.”

== See also ==
- List of foreign nationals detained in Iran
