= Morad Tahbaz =

Iranian-American businessman and conservationist

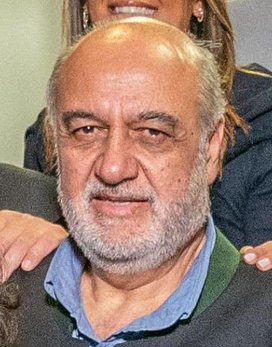
Image of Morad Tahbaz

Morad Tahbaz is an Iranian-American businessman and conservationist. He was born in London and holds both British and U.S. citizenship. Tahbaz is a co-founder of the Persian Wildlife Heritage Foundation (PWHF). In January 2018, Iranian authorities arrested Tahbaz along with eight other PWHF-affiliated individuals.

In 2018, an Iranian Presidential Commission composed of Cabinet Ministers appointed by Iranian President Rouhani investigated allegations of spying and concluded that the facts do not support the claims against Tahbaz or his colleagues. Iranian Lawmaker Mahmud Sadeghi said that Tabhaz and his colleagues did nothing wrong and “must be freed soon.”

In November 2019, the Iranian judiciary sentenced Tahbaz to 10 years in prison for "contacts with the US enemy government."

In June 2020 and on the occasion of World Environment Day, US Department of State called for the release of Morad Tahbaz. In a video message, Brian Hook encouraged governments to join this call to end the detention of Tahbaz and his colleagues. Tahbaz's family is a part of the Bring Our Families Home campaign which works to bring home wrongful detainees and hostages.

Tahbaz was released from prison 'on furlough' on March 16, 2022. He was returned to prison two days later.

He was ultimately freed from imprisonment in Iran on September 18, 2023, as part of an Iran–United States prisoner release deal mediated by Qatar.

== Education ==
Tahbaz graduated from Colgate University in 1977 with a degree in liberal arts and from Columbia University in 1983 with an MBA.

== See also ==
- List of foreign nationals detained in Iran
- Niloufar Bayani, PWHF employee also being held in detention
- Hostage diplomacy
