= Anoosheh Ashoori =

British-Iranian businessman imprisoned in Iran

- Persian: انوشه آشوری
- Occupation: Businessman (retired)
- Known for: 5-year detention by the Islamic Republic of Iran on "espionage" charges

Anoosheh Ashoori (Persian: انوشه آشوری) is a British–Iranian businessman formerly detained in Evin jail in Iran between 2017 and 2022.

== Early life and career ==
Ashoori spent 10 years in the UK from 1972, while he studied mechanical and aeronautical engineering, returning to Iran to take care of his ailing father. He returned to the UK in 2005 to "expand his business abroad".

== Detention and imprisonment ==
Iranian authorities arrested Ashoori in August 2017, when he was in the country to visit his mother. In August 2019, the Iranian judiciary sentenced Ashoori to 12 years in prison; 10 years for allegedly "spying for Israel's Mossad" and two years for "acquiring illegitimate wealth", charges which Ashoori denies.

British academics and Ashoori's family have stated that Ashoori's detention, and that of other jailed Iranian dual citizens, is connected to diplomatic disputes between Iran and the UK. Ashoori described his life in Evin jail in an article in The Guardian.

Ashoori, and Nazanin Zaghari-Ratcliffe, were released on 16 March 2022.

== Post-release activities and advocacy ==
Following his release, Ashoori became involved in public advocacy and awareness efforts relating to detainees held in Iran. He has participated in interviews and media appearances discussing his experiences and the wider issue of dual nationals detained abroad. He also began work on a memoir recounting his time in detention.

He has spoken publicly about the long-term psychological effects of his imprisonment, including ongoing trauma.

== Public appearances and recognition ==
Ashoori has taken part in awareness campaigns, including running the London Marathon. He has been awarded a "Spirit of the London Marathon" honour. He has also spoken at public events, including invitations from Amnesty International, to discuss his imprisonment.

In 2025, Ashoori was featured in a BBC documentary examining cases of hostages and international diplomacy.

== See also ==
- Iran–United Kingdom relations
- List of foreign nationals detained in Iran
