= Baquer Namazi =

Iranian-American imprisoned in Iran

Mohammad Baquer Namazi (Persian: محمدباقر نمازی; born 3 December 1936) is an Iranian-American former civil servant who served as Governor of Khuzestan province under Shah Mohammad Reza Pahlavi. He was imprisoned in Iran from 2016 until 2022.

On October 13, 2015, Iran's Islamic Revolutionary Guard Corps arrested his son, Siamak Namazi, while he was in the country on business. The Revolutionary Guards subsequently arrested Baquer as well on February 22, 2016, when he flew into the country to visit his imprisoned son. On October 17, 2016, Iranian authorities sentenced Baquer and Siamak to ten years in prison for "collusion with an enemy state," in reference to the United States.

Namazi was released on October 1, 2022, during the Mahsa Amini protests. Their release was purportedly in exchange for the release of $7 billion in frozen Iranian assets; however the United States refuted any connection between releasing the hostages and the frozen assets.

Namazi's family is a part of the Bring Our Families Home campaign which advocates to bring home wrongful detainees and hostages. Namazi's image is featured in a 15-foot mural in Georgetown (Washington, D.C.) along with other Americans wrongfully detained abroad.

== See also ==
- List of foreign nationals detained in Iran
