= Aras Amiri =

Iranian-British national

Aras Amiri is an Iranian national who resides in London, where she works as an artist affairs officer for the British Council. In 2018, Amiri was arrested by the Iranian authorities during a visit in Iran, and in 2019 was sentenced to 10 years for "cultural infiltration".

Because she did not hold dual citizenship, she had no support from the Foreign Office during her arrest. Amiri was then released on in April 2020, following the COVID-19 crisis. In August 2021, Amiri was acquitted from her charges.

== Arrest ==
Amiri was arrested when she travelled to Iran on a family visit. She was charged with subversion in relation to her work at the British Council involving Iranian artists. She avoided campaigning for her release in the UK at the time of her arrest, opting for discrete lobbying of the judiciary through her family.

She was released after serving roughly a third of a 10-year sentence, including 69 days in solitary confinement, and returned to Britain.

== Later activism ==
In 2023, Amiri flagged the plight of Niloufar Bayani, Sepideh Kashani and five other imprisoned individuals from the Persian Wildlife Heritage Foundation.

The group was accused of using their environmental projects tracking critically-endangered wild Asiatic cheetahs as a front for espionage. In 2019, despite a committee of Iranian ministers finding no evidence of espionage, the environmentalists were convicted by a Revolutionary Court on national security charges, resulting in prison sentences. Aras Amiri said the arrests were part of a broader crackdown on environmentalists in Iran.

== See also ==
- List of foreign nationals detained in Iran
