= Siamak Namazi =

Iranian-American businessman

Siamak Namazi (Persian: سیامک نمازی; born September 14 or October 14, 1971) is an Iranian-American businessman. He was detained in Evin Prison in Iran from October 13, 2015 until his release on September 18, 2023.

On February 22, 2016, Iranian authorities arrested Baquer Namazi, Siamak's father, when he arrived in the country to visit his son. On October 18, 2016, Baquer and Siamak Namazi were sentenced to 10 years in prison for collaborating with a foreign government. CNN reported that according to his legal team, he was the "longest-held Iranian-American imprisoned in Iran." He was released on a brief furlough on October 1, 2022.

Namazi's family is a part of the Bring Our Families Home campaign which advocates to bring home wrongful detainees and hostages. Namazi's image is featured in a 15-foot mural in Georgetown (Washington, D.C.) along with other Americans wrongfully detained abroad.

In mid September 2023, Reuters reported that the United States agreed to allow the Islamic Republic of Iran to receive $6 billion of Iranian oil revenue frozen in South Korea since 2018 in exchange for the release of Namazi and 4 others. The money went from South Korea to Qatar and was supposed to ultimately to Iranian government accounts, with the United States retaining oversight over the funds "to be spent for humanitarian purposes", but the US later reneged on the deal and refroze the assets in Qatar after the October 7 attacks.

Namazi was ultimately freed from imprisonment in Iran on September 18, 2023, as part of an Iran–United States prisoner release deal mediated by Qatar. In September 2024, Namazi spoke about his detainment and subsequent imprisonment in Evin Prison, stating he endured around eight months of solitary confinement overall, as well as blindfolding, weeks of beatings, and "humiliation" he was not comfortable describing in detail. He stated that "no one is as angry, no one is as disgusted at the fact that the Islamic Republic, this horrible regime, profited from blighting my life, than me and the other hostages and our families," but that he recognized that "unfortunately, we have to make distasteful deals to get out our people." Namazi also claimed that there was a notable lack of support structure once he arrived in the United States, and that the West can do more to deter and punish states that participate in what he called hostage-taking.

== See also ==
- List of foreign nationals detained in Iran
