= Hostage diplomacy =

Taking hostages for diplomatic purposes

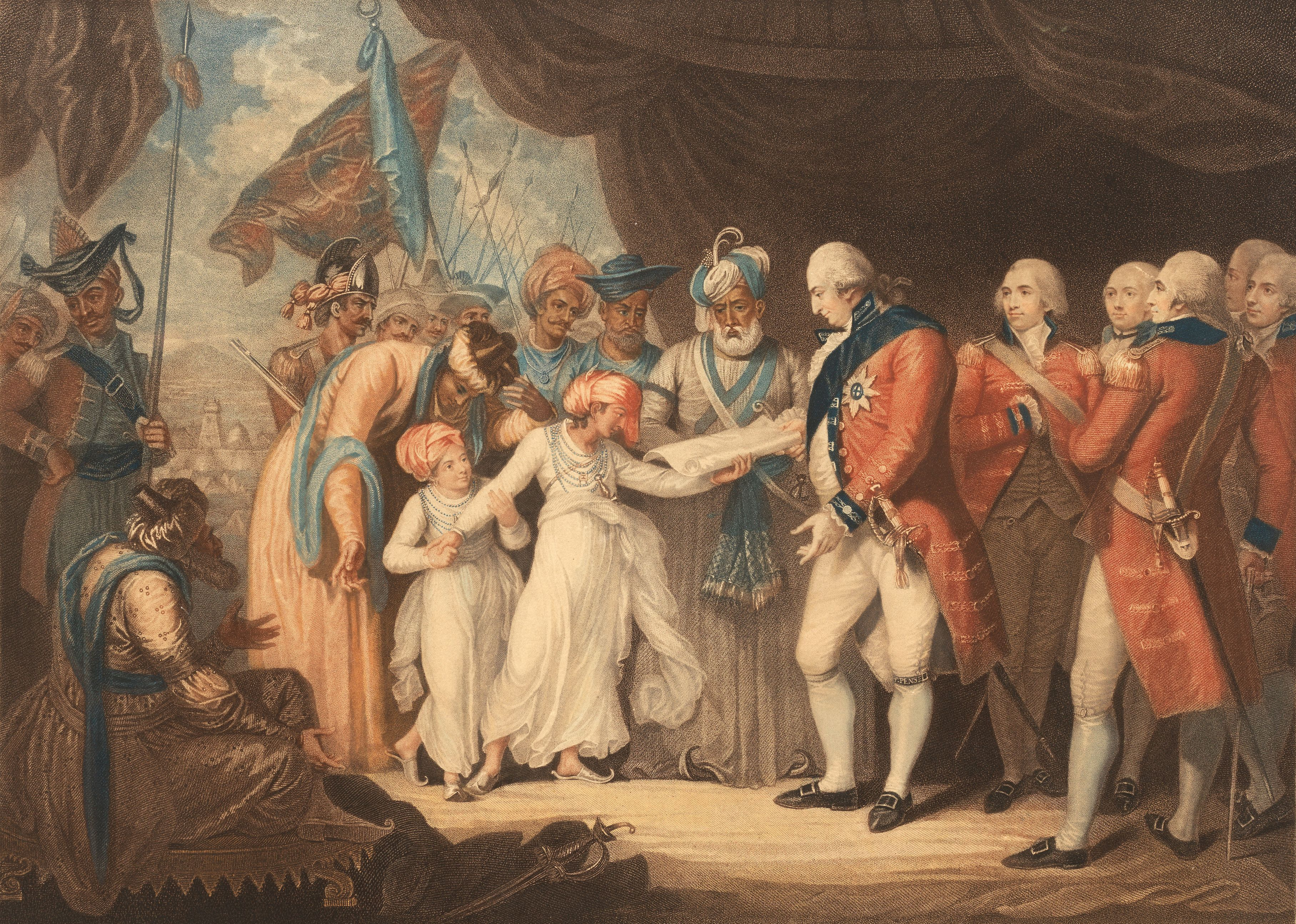
Lord Cornwallis receiving Tipu Sultan's sons as hostages on 26 February 1792 during the Third Anglo-Mysore War

Hostage diplomacy, also hostage-diplomacy, is the taking of hostages for diplomatic purposes. While common in the ancient world, it is a controversial practice in modern diplomacy. Modern countries regarded as having engaged in hostage diplomacy include China, Turkey, Iran, North Korea, and Russia.

== Background and overview ==
The custom of taking hostages was an integral part of foreign relations in the ancient world. This long history of political and military use indicates that political authorities or generals would legally agree to hand over one or usually several hostages in the custody of the other side, as guarantee of good faith in the observance of obligations. These obligations would be in the form of signing of a peace treaty, in the hands of the victor, the acceptance of vassalship, or even exchange hostages as mutual assurance in cases such as an armistice.

In ancient China, during the period of Eastern Zhou, vassal states would exchange hostages to ensure mutual trust. Such a hostage was known as zhìzǐ (質子, "hostage son"), who was usually a prince of the ruling house. During the Han dynasty, taking unilateral hostages consisting of zhìzǐ was a standard practice for the centralized monarchy to control smaller yí states. Some Chinese classic texts, however, were against the hostage system. On the famous exchange of hostages between Zhou and Zheng (周鄭交質), the Zuo zhuan criticized the incidence:

If there be not good faith in the heart, hostages are of no use. If parties act with intelligence and with mutual consideration, their actions under the rule of propriety, although there be no exchange of hostages, they cannot be alienated. (信不由中，質無益也，明恕而行，要之以禮，雖無有質，誰能間之)

The Romans were also accustomed to taking the sons of tributary princes and educating them in Rome, thus holding a guarantee for the continued loyalty of the conquered nation and also instilling a possible future ruler with Roman ideology. This practice was also adopted in the early period of the British occupation of India, and by France in relations with Arab nations in North Africa.

In contemporary times, hostage diplomacy is the taking of hostages for diplomatic purposes. It has a negative connotation, associated with criminal hostage-taking, and often manifests as foreigners being arrested on trumped-up charges. The diplomatic hostages are then held as bargaining chips.

== Modern examples ==
=== Burkina Faso ===
In December 2023, four agents of the French DGSE were imprisoned by Burkina Faso authorities upon their arrival in Ouagadougou, the capital of Burkina Faso. Local officials claimed that "they were not sent through the usual diplomatic channels" and that their phones contained "a large amount of information about local contacts in the country."

According to the French press, observers have linked the situation to "the growing influence of Russia's Wagner forces", suggesting that the local authorities were pressured to choose between Russia or France – "but not both", under what was described as an ultimatum. The DGSE acknowledged that "several mistakes were made", but emphasized two key points: first, the military influence of Russia, and second, France's condemnation of the twin coups d’état in Ouagadougou in 2024, directed against the coup instigators by the French President.

After France reached an agreement with Morocco supporting its position on the management of Western Sahara – opposing Algeria's proposal – Morocco's diplomatic services stepped in to assist. During the coups in Burkina Faso, King Mohammed VI called only for "avoiding bloodshed as much as possible", without condemning any side. By the end of 2024, after a renewed diplomatic rapprochement between Morocco and France, Moroccan officials helped convince Burkina Faso authorities to release the agents. They had been imprisoned for about a year.

=== China ===
According to The Guardian, China has a track record of hostage diplomacy but has repeatedly denied engaging in the practice. From 1967 to 1969, the Chinese Communist Party kept two dozen British diplomats and civilians as de facto hostages. The British were able to effect the release of their personnel by decoupling the hostage situation from broader political and economic issues through protracted negotiation.

It is widely believed that China detained two Canadians, Michael Spavor and Michael Kovrig, in response to the arrest of Meng Wanzhou. In 2019, Australian Yang Hengjun's detention was also linked to a renewed effort at hostage diplomacy in response to the arrest of Meng Wanzhou. Prior to Hengjun's detention, the Australian government had sharply criticized the Chinese government for detaining the two Canadians. The 2020 arrest of the Australian news anchor Cheng Lei has been viewed as a possible incidence of hostage diplomacy. The February 2019 exit ban placed on Irish citizen Richard O'Halloran has also been considered a case of hostage diplomacy.

The Lowy Institute has concluded that China's use of hostage diplomacy, among other things, undermines their "peaceful rise" narrative. The Taiwanese government has expressed concerns that the Hong Kong national security law will be used to facilitate further Chinese hostage diplomacy. According to Taiwan News in 2020, China began practicing hostage diplomacy towards Taiwan, a target against which it hadn't been used for some time.

On 15 February 2021, 58 countries including Japan, Australia, the United Kingdom, and the United States formed a coalition led by Canada, signed a non-binding declaration, and condemned the arbitrary detention of foreign nationals for diplomatic leverage. While China was not officially called out, Canadian and American officials said that China had been the subject of the statement. The Canadian foreign ministry said it was not targeting a single nation but was bringing diplomatic pressure on the issue. Shortly after, China's embassy in Canada released an article published by the Chinese Communist Party-owned tabloid Global Times, which dismissed the coalition's efforts as an "aggressive and ill-considered attack designed to provoke China".

In September 2021, following the release of Meng Wanzhou, the two Canadians held in China as well as two Americans held in China whose detentions were suspected of being linked to hostage diplomacy over Meng Wanzhou's court case were freed.

China is also known to have detained American citizens including Mark Swidan, Alice Lin, and Kai Li. The detentions of Swidan and Li have been ruled arbitrary by an independent group of human rights experts at the United Nations Working Group on Arbitrary Detention.

=== Gaza ===
Hamas uses hostage diplomacy as a means of political leverage. This is particularly evident in the way the organization takes hostages to exert pressure on Israel, particularly on its Blockade of the Gaza Strip.

=== Iran ===
Modern Iranian hostage diplomacy began soon after the Iranian revolution with the Iran hostage crisis.

Iran's government has used hostage diplomacy as a key diplomatic tool. Hostages have included, Ana Diamond, Nazanin Zaghari-Ratcliffe, Jolie King, Kylie Moore-Gilbert, Morad Tahbaz, Kamal Foroughi, Aras Amiri, Kameel Ahmady, Farid Safarli and Anousheh Ashouri.

According to diplomat Hans-Jakob Schindler, the case of businessman Helmut Hofer marked the first known instance of "hostage diplomacy" involving Germany. Hofer was arrested in Tehran in 1997, accused of having sex with an unmarried Muslim woman — an offense punishable by death under Sharia law. It is believed that the woman may have acted on behalf of the Iranian government, as such an accusation could have risked her own life. Schindler, now head of the "Counter Extremism Project", has noted that the Islamic Republic of Iran used Hofer and other detainees as political hostages. Five years later, German angler Donald Klein was also detained on allegations of illegal border crossing and sentenced to 18 months in prison. In the background was Iran's pressure on Germany to release Kazem Darabi, a terrorist convicted for the Mykonos assassinations. Despite this, Germany resisted Iran's demands, with Hofer released in 2000 and Klein in 2007; Darabi was deported to Iran shortly afterward. At the time, the German government denied speculation of a deal with the Islamic Republic.

In late-September 2019, when questioned about the Zaghari-Ratcliffe case, Iranian President Hassan Rouhani compared the imprisonment of foreigners in Iran to the imprisonment of Iranians in Western countries—saying that leaders on both sides were denying power over the decisions of their own judiciary, and that "we must all" exert "a constant, concerted effort ... so ... all prisoners must be free ... but it must be a path that travels both ways."

The 2020 detention of Jamshid Sharmahd, a German-Iranian Citizen who lived in the United-States, who was captured by Iranian authorities in Dubai in a covert operation, has added to criticisms of German diplomacy. Sharmahd, accused of involvement in terrorist activities by the Islamic Republic, was executed in 2024. His case drew significant international condemnation, especially concerning Germany's response. Journalist Gilda Sahebi criticized the German government for not publicly designating Sharmahd as a political hostage, unlike the Austrian and French governments in similar cases.

Farid Safarli was a student at a German university at the time of his arrest. He had traveled to Iran to meet his Iranian girlfriend but was later arrested by the IRGC and held for two months in solitary confinement at the notorious Evin Prison. His case has characteristics of a hostage situation. His detention came amid strained Azerbaijan-Iran relations early 2023, and his eventual release after almost two years was part of a prisoner exchange involving an Iranian spy held in Azerbaijan. This aligns with patterns seen in other cases where foreign nationals are detained in Iran under disputed charges to be used as a political bargaining chip.

As of 2022, Iran held 20 to 40 foreigners.

=== North Korea ===
North Korea has made wide use of hostage diplomacy as a tool against the US, South Korea, Japan, Malaysia and various European nations. Those held hostage are often tourists or exchange students who are either charged with minor offenses or espionage. In recent years it has been speculated that the regime of Kim Jong-un had evolved from using hostages to gain leverage to using hostages as human shields to protect against a feared American intervention. The case of Otto Warmbier, which ended in Warmbier's death soon after his release, is a particularly well known example of North Korean hostage diplomacy.

=== Russia ===
Russia has been accused of hostage diplomacy in the cases of Paul Whelan and Brittney Griner, and has exchanged prisoners with the United States in the past.

=== Turkey ===
According to Eric Edelman and Aykan Erdemir of the Foundation for Defense of Democracies, hostage diplomacy has been widely used by Turkish President Recep Tayyip Erdoğan. The case of Andrew Brunson, an American pastor working in Turkey who was imprisoned in 2016, has been widely referred to as a case of diplomatic hostage taking.

=== United States ===
Many French media outlets and newspapers consider the case of Frédéric Pierucci, an executive at the French company Alstom, in relation to its acquisition by the American group General Electric, as a textbook example of hostage diplomacy. The French executive was imprisoned for several months in a high-security prison, with no contact with his family or employer for weeks.

In 2013, the case was taken very seriously in France, especially as Pierucci was released just one week after the acquisition agreement was signed. His case has since become a symbol of ongoing economic warfare between France and the United States.

=== Venezuela ===
In October 2022, Efraín Antonio Campo Flores and Francisco Flores, nephews of Venezuelan president Nicolás Maduro who were imprisoned by the US for their involvement in the Narcosobrinos affair, were freed in a prisoner swap for seven American directors of the oil refinery corporation CITGO (part of the Citgo Six) who were imprisoned in Venezuela.

== See also ==
- Wrongful detention
- Migration diplomacy
- Full spectrum diplomacy
- Gunboat diplomacy
- Hard power
- Soft power
- List of Chinese spy cases in the United States
- Sklavenkasse
- Pidyon shvuyim
- Prisoner exchange
- Political prisoner
