= Embassy of the United Kingdom, Tehran =

Diplomatic mission of UK in Iran

Embassy of the United Kingdom in Tehran
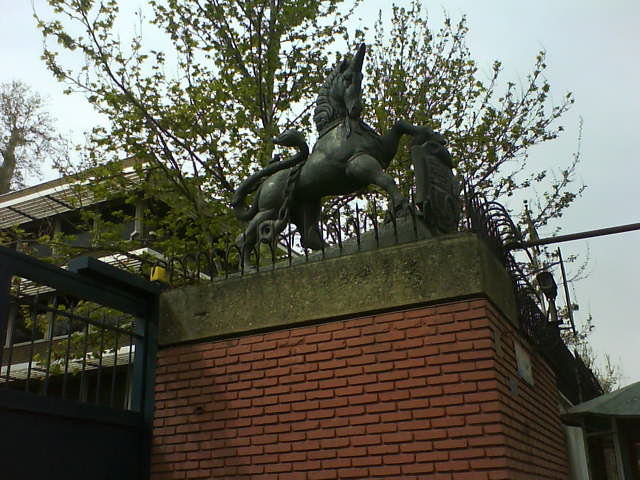
- Location: Tehran, Iran
- Address: 172 Ferdowsi Avenue, Tehran
- Coordinates: 35°41′47.5″N 51°25′06.7″E
- Website: Official website

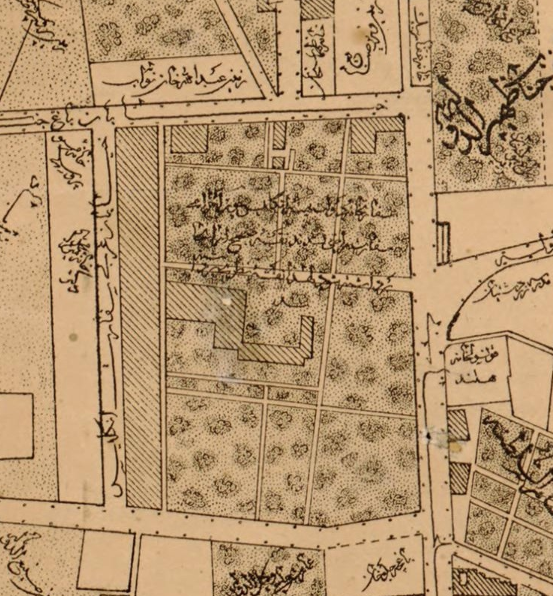
Embassy of the United Kingdom, Tehran -1889

The Embassy of the United Kingdom in Tehran is the United Kingdom's diplomatic mission to the Islamic Republic of Iran. It is located at 172 Ferdowsi Avenue in Tehran.

Following the 2011 attack on the Embassy and the expulsion of the British ambassador by Iran, Britain reduced its diplomatic relations with Iran to "the lowest possible level" and closed its embassy. However, following the election of President Hassan Rouhani, relations improved and both countries appointed non-resident charge d'affaires to conduct bilateral relations between London and Tehran. The embassy reopened in August 2015 and relations were upgraded in 2016, with relations now conducted once again by an ambassador. The current ambassador to Iran is Hugo Shorter.

== History ==
In 1821, the British Mission in Tehran was first established in the Old Bazaar. By the 1860s, the overcrowding and poor sanitary conditions forced the government to look for a more suitable location and the Ferdowsi site was purchased. To supervise the construction of the new Legation Buildings, James Wild, the architect, was commissioned. He was an established architect with experience of the Middle East. The building was finished in June 1876.

=== Persian Constitutional Revolution ===
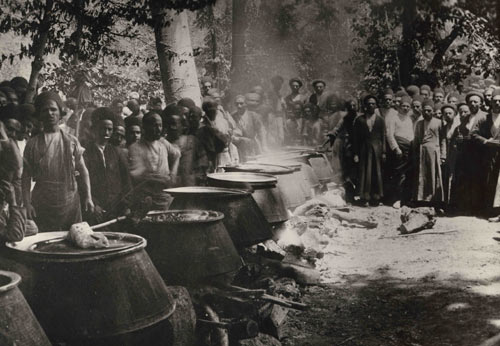
Bast at British Embassy, 1906

Most famous of all the historical events associated with the embassy is the great 'bast' (meaning sanctuary) of July/August 1906 when, during the constitutional revolution, some 12–16,000 Tehranis took sanctuary in the compound and paralysed the life of the city. Thus, Mozaffar ad-din Shah Qajar was forced to issue the Farman of 5 August 1906 granting the people a constitution and National Assembly.

=== Iranian Revolution ===
Following the Islamic revolution in 1979, the British Embassy was placed under the protection of Sweden. In 1981 the Islamic Republic was busily renaming many of the streets in Tehran. They mainly changed names connected with the Pahlavi dynasty and royalty generally (Pahlavi Avenue became Vali-Asr, Avenue Farah became Sohrevardi Avenue, Avenue Naderi became Jomhuriye (Republic) Street etc.) The British Embassy occupies an entire city block and is therefore bounded by four streets. It had always had its main entrance fronting east onto Ferdowsi Avenue named after the uncontroversial medieval Persian poet—this main avenue has kept its original name to this day. To the north, France Avenue was renamed Neauphle-le-Chateau after the small French town where Ayatollah Khomeini lived immediately prior to his return to Iran. The western edge of the British Embassy compound was changed from 'Winston Churchill Street' to 'Bobby Sands Street' after IRA hunger striker Bobby Sands in a deliberate effort to tweak the tail of the British imperial lion immortalised on the Ferdowsi Avenue gateposts. The embassy has never had an entrance or exit (whether for pedestrians or vehicles) on Winston Churchill/ Bobby Sands street. Therefore (and contrary to previous misinformation) the embassy entrance was never moved in order to change its official address. In 1987, all staff were withdrawn from Tehran following a series of setbacks to relations. In November 1988, the UK's Foreign Secretary Geoffrey Howe agreed with Iranian Foreign Minister Ali Akbar Velayati to resume diplomatic contact. Staff returned in January 1989.

=== The Satanic Verses controversy ===
On 14 February 1989, Ayatollah Khomeini issued a fatwa against Salman Rushdie and his publishers. European Community Foreign Ministers agreed to withdraw their heads of mission from Tehran in response. The British Government withdrew all UK-based staff. Iraq's invasion of Kuwait made it desirable to re-establish relations once more, in September 1990.

=== Mykonos restaurant assassinations ===
The UK and all other EU countries withdrew their heads of mission in April 1997 when a German court issued a verdict that members of the Iranian intelligence services were responsible for the murder of four Iranian Kurds in Germany in 1992. Heads of mission returned in November 1997 following the election of President Mohammad Khatami, who showed determination to pursue the establishment of a civil society and the rule of law, and to promote wider international understanding. Britain and Iran jointly upgraded the relationship to ambassadorial status in 1999.

=== 2011 storming ===
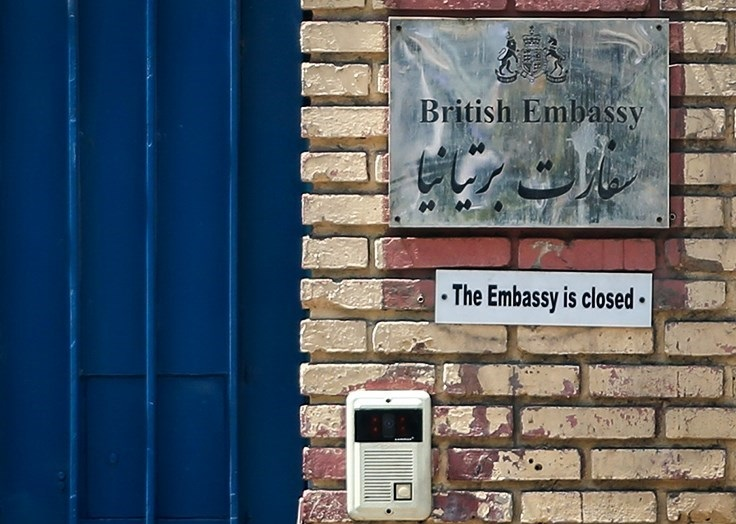
Closed embassy in 2015

On 29 November 2011, two compounds of the British embassy in Tehran were stormed by Iranian protesters. The protesters smashed windows, ransacked offices, set fire to government documents, and burned a British flag.

The storming of the British embassy followed from the 2011 joint American-British-Canadian sanctions and the Iranian government's Guardian Council approving a parliamentary bill expelling the British ambassador as a result of those sanctions. A British flag was taken down and replaced by the Iranian flag by the protesters. The British Foreign Office responded by saying "We are outraged by this. It is utterly unacceptable and we condemn it." According to Iranian state news agencies, the protesters were largely composed of young adults. On 30 November 2011, in response to the attack, the UK closed its embassy in Tehran and ordered the Iranian embassy in London closed. In order to continue providing consular assistance to British citizens in Iran, the UK appointed Sweden as a protecting power; Iran similarly appointed Oman as its protecting power in London.

=== Reestablishment of relations ===
In July 2013, it was announced that the UK would consider to open better relations with Iran "step-by-step" following the election of President Hassan Rouhani. In November 2013, Iran and the UK agreed to end the protecting power arrangements of Sweden and Oman and appointed non-resident charge d'affaires to conduct bilateral relations between London and Tehran. In June 2014, the UK announced that it intended to reopen its embassy in Tehran once practical arrangements had been completed and predicted that Iran would reopen its embassy in London. In August 2015, the embassy was reopened by Philip Hammond, the British Foreign Secretary. The embassy continued to be managed by a charge d'affaires until 2016, when the then-incumbent Nicholas Hopton was promoted to ambassador.

=== Arrest of ambassador ===
On 11 January 2020, the British Ambassador to Iran Robert Macaire was arrested in Iran before being released shortly after. Foreign Secretary Dominic Raab described the events as a "flagrant violation of international law".

=== 2026 temporary closure ===
The embassy was temporarily closed and staff evacuated on 14 January 2026 during the 2025–2026 Iranian protests.

== Gholhak Garden ==
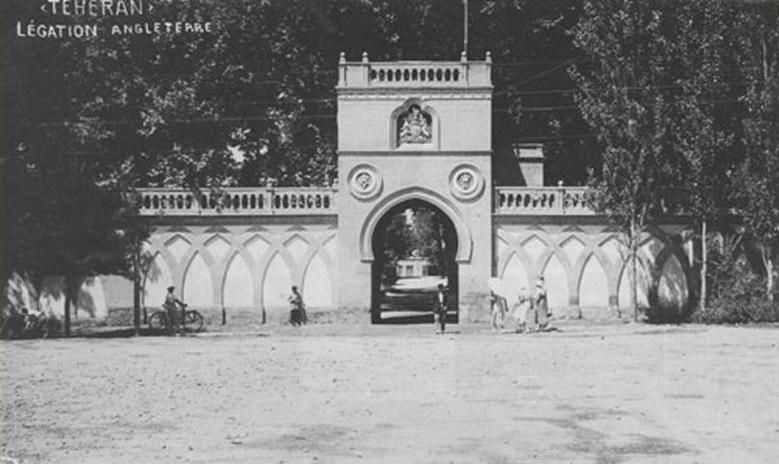
Embassy in 1920

Gholhak Garden (alternatively Qolhak Garden or Gulhak Garden) is a British diplomatic compound in the northern Tehran neighborhood of Gholhak in Iran, about 4.8 kilometres (3 mi) from the centre of Tehran. The sprawling tree-lined site, bordered by high walls, measures 200,000 square metres (49 acres) and houses British diplomats and their families. The compound is also home to the Tehran War Cemetery. The site has been at the centre of diplomatic controversy between Britain and Iran over ownership and management of the grounds.

The Qajar monarchy gave the land for Gholhak Garden to the United Kingdom in the 19th century during the height of the British Empire for their ambassador to use as a summer residence.

Gholhak Garden is separate from the historic British embassy several miles south in central Tehran, where British ambassadors have now lived for decades. In 2011, several British diplomats and their families as well as some Iranian embassy staff resided in the Gholhak complex.

The Islamic Republic of Iran, which has had strained relations with the United Kingdom, has on occasion demanded the return of the Gholhak property to Iran.

Gholhak Garden and the British embassy in central Tehran have been subject to periodic anti-Western demonstrations orchestrated by the Iranian government since the defunct American embassy has no longer been the central target after being taken over in 1979 during the Iran hostage crisis.

Iranian protesters stormed the garden at the same time as the British embassy in 2011.

== See also ==
- Gholhak Garden
- Tehran War Cemetery
- Iran–United Kingdom relations
- List of diplomatic missions in Iran
- List of Ambassadors of the United Kingdom to Iran
