= 2011 British Embassy in Iran attack =

2011 attack on the British Embassy in Tehran
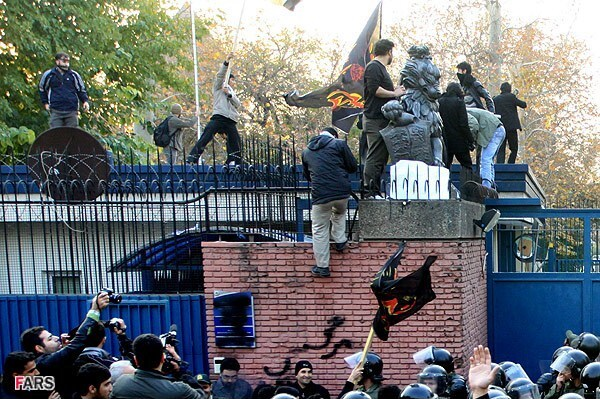
- Protestors storming the walls
- Date: 29 November 2011
- Location: Jomhouri, Tehran, Iran; 35°41′47″N 51°25′09″E
- Methods: Demonstrations, riots, online activism, vandalism

Number
Several thousand protesters	

Casualties
- Injuries: ~20 Iranian protesters ~3 British officials
- Arrested: 12 Iranian protesters

On 29 November 2011, a crowd of Iranian protesters gathered outside the British Embassy in the central Jomhouri district of Tehran before a faction of hardline students and demonstrators stormed the compound and a separate British diplomatic site in northern Tehran known as Gholhak Garden.

The attack came several days after Iran's parliament voted to downgrade diplomatic ties with the UK in retaliation for Britain's role in pushing stringent new financial sanctions targeting the Central Bank of Iran and broader economy, measures tied directly to an International Atomic Energy Agency report highlighting evidence of weaponization in Iran's nuclear program, which had inflamed longstanding anti-Western sentiments and accusations of colonial interference. What began as a sanctioned rally demanding the expulsion of the British ambassador quickly escalated as protesters breached the embassy walls, chanted slogans like "Death to England," "Death to America," and "Death to Israel," ripped down the Union Jack, and ransacked offices.

The event shocked the international community, evoked memories of the 1979 U.S. embassy hostage crisis, and prompted swift condemnation from Tehran while raising suspicions of tacit official approval given the delayed police response.

== Background ==
The British government had imposed numerous sanctions on Iran regarding concerns over the nature of Iran's nuclear program. Following the release of a November 2011 International Atomic Energy Agency report that documented weaponisation elements of Iran's nuclear activities, the British government banned all financial institutions in the United Kingdom doing business with their counterparts in Iran, including Iran's central bank. Iran responded by approving a bill to downgrade its ties with the United Kingdom, including a requirement for both countries to withdraw their respective ambassadors.

== Incursion ==
About 1,000 people gathered near the embassy to demand that the British ambassador be sent home immediately. The rally began quietly, but some participants stormed the building, breaking down the door, throwing around papers and replacing the British flag with an Iranian one. The Iranian security forces initially did not intervene as protesters entered the British Embassy. Protesters removed the mission's flag and ransacked offices. The protesters chanted, "Death to America", "Death to England" and "Death to Israel", among other slogans.

According to the British Ambassador to Iran Dominick Chilcott, protesters rampaged through the embassy building, destroying paintings and furniture, spraying graffiti, smashing windows and starting fires. Seven embassy staff were seized by protesters but were eventually escorted out by police. The protesters also stole mobile phones and computers.

British Prime Minister David Cameron described the incursion as "outrageous and indefensible" and demanded that Iran immediately ensure the safety of all British Embassy personnel. Foreign Secretary William Hague said the "irresponsible action" had put the safety of diplomats and their families at risk and caused extensive damage to embassy property. Protesters also targeted Gholhak Garden, a British diplomatic compound in northern Tehran whose ownership has been a source of contention between Iranian and UK officials, pulling down a portrait of the Queen and burning an embassy vehicle, as well as British, US and Israeli flags. Iran expressed regret over the attacks and police arrested 12 protesters.

=== Perpetrators ===
Iranian state media agencies and certain international news sources described the protests as a reaction of students against Britain's anti-Iran policies. The demonstrators themselves issued an official statement, declaring, "Our actions are a spontaneous reaction of revolutionary students and were not ordered by any state organ."

In a statement to the House of Commons on 30 November, Foreign Secretary William Hague said: "Iran is a country where Opposition leaders are under house arrest, more than 500 people have been executed so far this year and where genuine protest is ruthlessly stamped on. The idea that the Iranian authorities could not have protected our Embassy or that this assault could have taken place without some degree of regime consent is fanciful".

Some analysts, media sources and Iranian opposition groups asserted that the attack was orchestrated by the Iranian authorities, hence the strong British reaction. Al Jazeera's correspondent in Tehran, Dorsa Jabbari, reported that the Iranian police and various ministries had prior knowledge of the protest, which was organised by the student arm of the Basij.

Police reportedly "stood back and let the protesters make their way into the compound". In the words of The Economist, "This was the centre of the capital city . . . If the police had wanted to stop this, they could have flooded the compound with officers and rescued the British. The police, and whoever was pulling the strings behind the attack, chose not to intervene for a long while".

Jabbari stated, "Any such action of this scale can never be independent in the Islamic Republic". Dominick Chilcott told the BBC, Iran is a country in which such action is only taken "with the acquiescence and the support of the state".

== Effect on international schools ==
The École Française de Téhéran (Tehran's French school) is located on property of the British embassy and had its classes in session as the embassy attack occurred. Several windows at the German Embassy School Tehran (DBST), near the British embassy, were destroyed. The French school, the German school, and the British School of Tehran (BST) closed indefinitely. The school board of trustees of the BST voted to have the school permanently disestablished, with the end date being 31 December 2011. The DBST acquired the assets of the BST and established an international section in the former BST buildings.

== Reactions ==
=== Within Iran ===
Iran's Foreign Ministry expressed regret over the attack, calling it "unacceptable" and said that it happened "despite the efforts made by the Iranian Law Enforcement Police and reinforcement of the embassy guards". Iranian police arrested 12 protesters in connection with the attack.

Two Iranian opposition student groups, Tahkim Vahdat and Advar Tahkim, issued statements criticising the attack. Tahkim Vahdat said that those behind it were "not true representative of Iranian students, they were affiliated with the authorities in power".

Iran's Deputy Police Chief Brigadier General Ahmad Reza Radan announced that police have started investigations into the details of the protests.

Iranian MP Parviz Sorouri, a senior member of the Majlis National Security and Foreign Policy Committee, said that "the British government's hasty decision to close down the Iranian Embassy in London has created a new situation for both sides. But the Iranian government will do its utmost to stand up for the rights of Iranian citizens living in Britain through the establishment of an interests section in London".

Subsequently, the Sultanate of Oman agreed to act as a protecting power, representing the interests of Iran through its embassy in London.

=== Within the United Kingdom ===
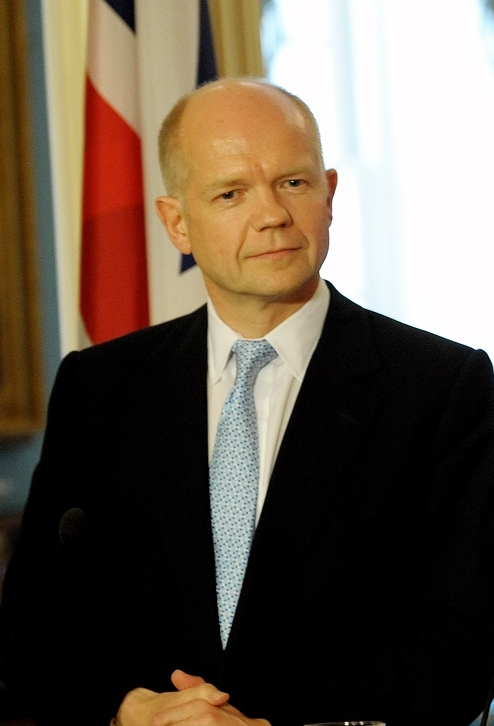
British Foreign Secretary William Hague condemned the attacks.

Following the incident, the Foreign and Commonwealth Office issued a statement saying that "we are outraged by this. It is utterly unacceptable and we condemn it". Later that evening David Cameron described the Iranian Government's failure to protect the embassy as a "disgrace". On 30 November 2011, during a speech to the House of Commons, Foreign Secretary William Hague announced that the Iranian Ambassador to the Court of St. James's, his ambassadorial staff and other Iranian diplomats had 48 hours to leave the United Kingdom. The foreign secretary also announced that he had closed the British Embassy, and its staff and dependants had left Tehran. This brought the United Kingdom's relations with Iran to their lowest level, and both the Foreign Secretary and Prime Minister had warned of far more "serious consequences" towards Iran, for its failure to uphold its international obligations in line with the Vienna Convention.

Deputy Prime Minister Nick Clegg told the BBC's Sarah Rainsford that the UK's relationship with Iran had "taken a very serious knock" but that "It doesn't mean we're cutting off all diplomatic relations with Iran. It doesn't mean we are in any way lessening our determination to try to find a diplomatic solution to the nuclear question, which is immensely important to Europe and the whole world, and we will continue to work tirelessly to find a negotiated solution".

In November 2013, Iran and the UK agreed to end the protecting power arrangements of Sweden and Oman and appointed non-resident charge d'affaires to conduct bilateral relations between London and Tehran. In June 2014, the UK announced that it intended to reopen its embassy in Tehran once practical arrangements had been completed and predicted that Iran would reopen its embassy in London.

=== United Nations ===
The United Nations Security Council condemned the attacks "in the strongest terms".

=== United States ===
United States Secretary of State Hillary Clinton described the attacks as an "affront" to the international community. US Vice-president Joe Biden said he had no evidence the attack on the British embassy in Tehran was orchestrated by Iranian authorities, but it was another example of why the country was a "pariah".

=== EU member states ===
France, Germany, Italy, and the Netherlands recalled their ambassadors to discuss the diplomatic matter, with Austria stating they are considering a similar decision.

While not recalling its own ambassador, Sweden summoned the Iranian Ambassador to the Swedish Foreign Ministry. Germany offered to act as a protecting power for the United Kingdom's diplomatic duties in Iran; Sweden took on those diplomatic duties as of July 2012. Hungary declined to recall its Ambassador to Iran following a meeting of EU Foreign Ministers on 1 December, saying it would cripple normal day-to-day operations due to its limited staff. However the Hungarian government joined its European allies in condemning the incident.

=== Russia and China ===
Russia condemned the attack, stating that the actions were "unacceptable and deserve condemnation". China did not criticise Iran by name but stated that "the relevant action runs counter to international law and basic norms of international relations and should be handled appropriately."

=== Canada ===
On 7 September 2012, Canada closed its embassy in Iran and declared all remaining Iranian diplomats in Canada persona non grata, ordering them to leave the country within five days.

== Reopening of the embassy ==
In August 2015, nearly four years after the closure of the British Embassy in Tehran, and only weeks after reaching a nuclear deal with Iran, it was announced by Iranian Foreign Minister Mohammad Javad Zarif in a joint press conference with British Foreign Secretary Philip Hammond at the Foreign Ministry in Tehran that the embassy will be reopened as soon as possible. The new round of relations between the two nations are on the account of the JCPOA and in anticipation of strategic relations in the course of coming years. However, a number of Iranian students and people protested against the reopening of the British embassy on Sunday morning in the presence of Foreign Secretary Phillip Hammond according to Fars News Agency.

== See also ==
- Iran hostage crisis
- 2011 attack on the Israeli Embassy in Egypt
- 2016 attack on the Saudi Embassy in Iran
