= Iran–United Kingdom relations =

- Iran: United Kingdom

Diplomatic mission
- Embassy of Iran, London: Embassy of the United Kingdom, Tehran

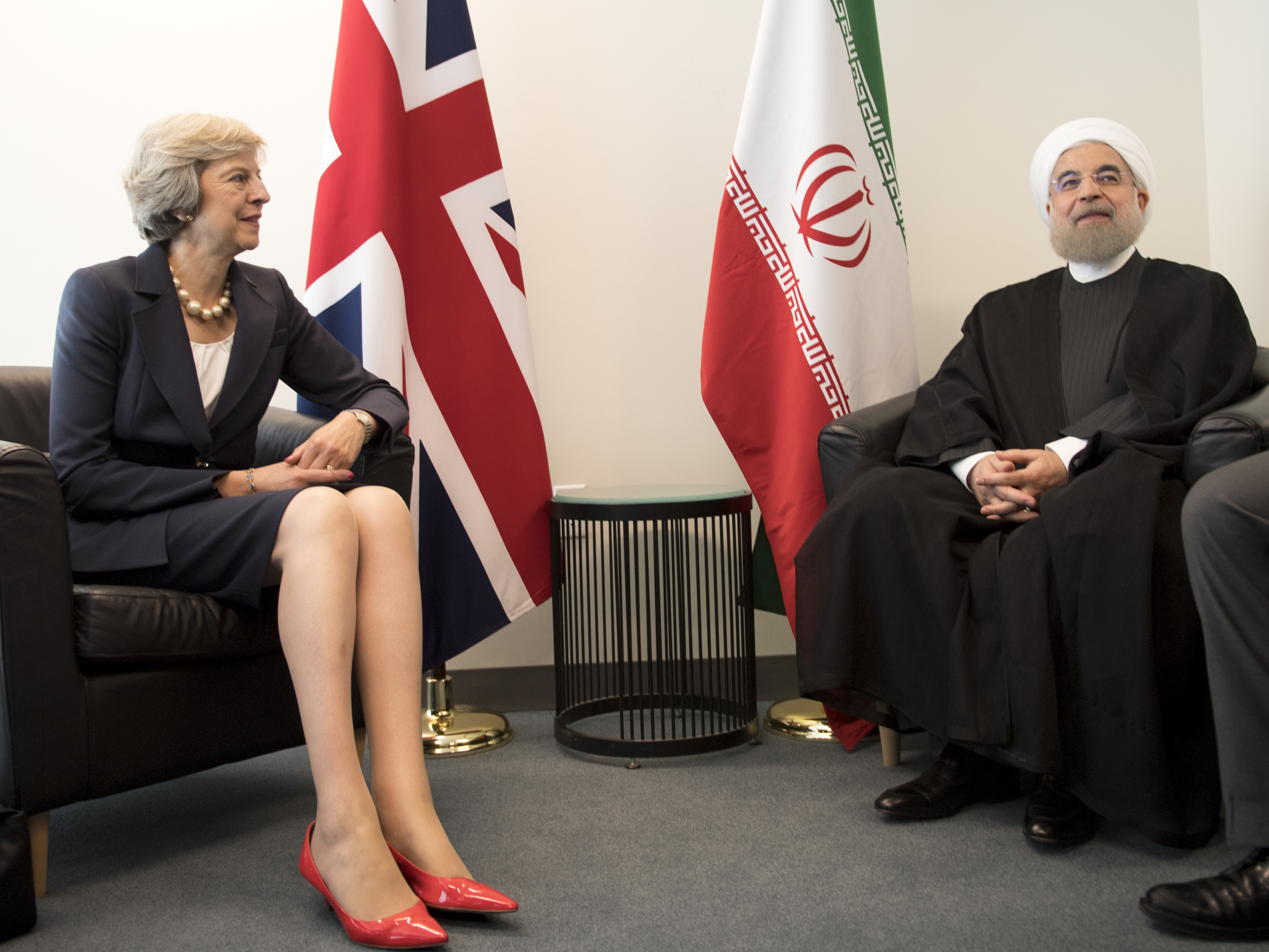
British Prime Minister Theresa May with Iranian President Hassan Rouhani at a United Nations General Assembly in New York City, September 2016.

Iran and the United Kingdom maintain diplomatic, economic, and historical interactions. Iran, which was called Persia by the West before 1935, has had political relations with England since the late Ilkhanate period (13th century) when King Edward I of England sent Geoffrey of Langley to the Ilkhanid court to seek an alliance. Until the early nineteenth century, Iran was a remote and legendary country for Britain, so much so that the European country never seriously established a diplomatic center, such as a consulate or embassy. By the middle of the nineteenth century, Iran grew in importance as a buffer state to the United Kingdom's dominion over India. In recent years, relations between Iran and the United Kingdom have been marked by hostility as the United Kingdom sanctioned Iran while Iran detained British citizens and conducted influence campaigns within the United Kingdom.

Both countries share common membership of the United Nations. Bilaterally the two countries have an Air Transport Agreement.

== History of Anglo-Iranian relations ==
=== Safavid era ===
In 1597, as Abbas I of Safavid sought to establish an alliance against his arch rival, the Ottomans, he received Robert Shirley, Anthony Shirley, and a group of 26 English envoys in Qazvin. Soon, the Shirley brothers were appointed by the Shah to organize and modernize the royal cavalry and train the army. The effects of these modernizations proved to be highly successful, as from then on the Safavids proved to be an equal force against their arch rival, immediately crushing them in the first war to come (Ottoman–Safavid War (1603–1618)) and all other Safavid wars to come. Many more events followed, including the debut of the British East India Company into Persia, and the establishment of trade routes for silk though Jask in the Strait of Hormuz in 1616. It was from here where the likes of Sir John Malcolm later gained influence into the Qajarid throne.

=== Qajar era ===
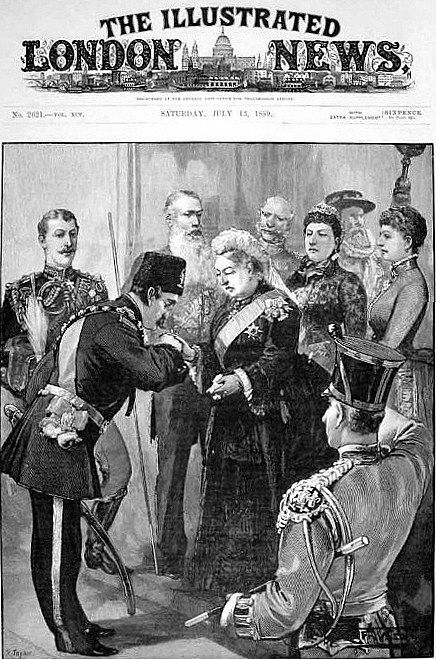
Nasereddin Shah of Persia is received by Queen Victoria at Windsor Castle in July 1859.

Anglo-Persian relations picked up momentum as a weakened Safavid empire, after the short-lived revival by the military genius Nader Shah (r. 1736-1747), eventually gave way to the Qajarid dynasty, which was quickly absorbed into domestic turmoil and rivalry, while competing colonial powers rapidly sought a stable foothold in the region. While the Portuguese, British, and Dutch, competed for the south and southeast of Persia in the Persian Gulf, Imperial Russia was largely left unchallenged in the north as it plunged southward to establish dominance in Persia's northern territories.

In the early 19th century, the British were driven by worries about Napoleon attacking India, while the Iranians were worried that the French would abandon them despite the Treaty of Finckenstein. This culminated in Iran and Britain agreeing to the "Preliminary Treaty of Friendship and Alliance" in 1809. Mirza Abolhassan Khan Ilchi was sent as the Iranian ambassador to London to wrap up the treaty.

A weakened and bankrupted royal court under Fath Ali Shah was forced to sign the Treaty of Gulistan in 1813, followed by the Treaty of Turkmenchay in 1828 after efforts by Abbas Mirza failed to secure Persia's northern front against Imperial Russia. The treaties were prepared by the Sir Gore Ouseley with the aid of the British Foreign Office in London. In fact, Iran's current southern and eastern boundaries were determined by none other than the British during the Anglo-Persian War (1856 to 1857). After repelling Nasereddin Shah's attack in Herat in 1857, the British government assigned Frederic John Goldsmid of the Indo-European Telegraph Department to determine the borders between Persia and British India during the 1860s.

By the end of the 19th century, Britain's dominance became so pronounced that Khuzestan, Bushehr, and a host of other cities in southern Persia were occupied by Great Britain, and the central government in Tehran was left with no power to even select its own ministers without the approval of the Anglo-Russian consulates. Morgan Shuster, for example, had to resign under tremendous British and Russian pressure on the royal court. Shuster's book The Strangling of Persia is a recount of the details of these events, a harsh criticism of Britain and Imperial Russia.

=== Pahlavi era ===
Of the public outcry against the inability of the Persian throne to maintain its political and economic independence from Great Britain and Imperial Russia in the face of events such as the Anglo-Russian Convention of 1907 and "the 1919 treaty", one result was the Persian Constitutional Revolution, which eventually resulted in the fall of the Qajar dynasty.

The great tremor of the Persian political landscape occurred when the involvement of General Edmund Ironside eventually led to the rise of Reza Shah Pahlavi in the 1920s. The popular view that the British were involved in the 1921 coup was noted as early as March 1921 by the American embassy and relayed to the Iran desk at the Foreign Office. A British Embassy report from 1932 concedes that the British put Reza Shah "on the throne".

A novel chapter in Anglo-Iranian relations had begun when Iran canceled its capitulation agreements with foreign powers in 1928. Iran's success in revoking the capitulation treaties, and the failure of the Anglo-Iranian Agreement of 1919 earlier, led to intense diplomatic efforts by the British government to regularize relations between the two countries on a treaty basis. The most intractable challenge, however, proved to be Iran's assiduous efforts to revise the terms whereby the APOC retained near monopoly control over the oil industry in Iran as a result of the concession granted to William Knox D'Arcy in 1901 by the Qajar King of the period.

The attempt to revise the terms of the oil concession on a more favorable basis for Iran led to protracted negotiations that took place in Tehran, Lausanne, London and Paris between Teymourtash and the chairman of APOC, Sir John Cadman, spanning the years from 1928 to 1932. Despite much progress, Rezā Shāh Pahlavi was soon to assert his authority by dramatically inserting himself into the negotiations. The Monarch attended a meeting of the Council of Ministers in November 1932, and after publicly rebuking Teymourtash for his failure to secure an agreement, dictated a letter to cabinet canceling the D'Arcy Agreement. The Iranian Government notified APOC that it would cease further negotiations and demanded cancellation of the D'Arcy concession. Rejecting the cancellation, the British government espoused the claim on behalf of APOC and brought the dispute before the Permanent Court of International Justice at The Hague, asserting that it regarded itself "as entitled to take all such measures as the situation may demand for the Company's protection." At this point, Hassan Taqizadeh, the new Iranian minister to have been entrusted the task of assuming responsibility for the oil dossier, was to intimate to the British that the cancellation was simply meant to expedite negotiations and that it would constitute political suicide for Iran to withdraw from negotiations.

Rezā Shāh was removed from power abruptly during the Anglo-Soviet invasion of Iran during World War II. The new Shah, Crown Prince Mohammad Reza Pahlavi, signed a Tripartite Treaty Alliance with Britain and the Soviet Union in January 1942, to aid in the allied war effort in a non-military way.

==== Post-nationalization Iran ====
In 1951, the Iranians nationalized the oil through a parliamentary bill on 21 March 1951. This caused a lot of tension between Iran and the UK. After the events of 1953, scores of Iranian political activists from the National and Communist parties were jailed or killed. This coup only added to the deep mistrust towards the British in Iran. It has since been very common in Iranian culture to mistrust British government.

The end of World War II brought the start of American dominance in Iran's political arena, and with an anti-Soviet Cold War brewing, the United States quickly moved to convert Iran into an anti-communist bloc, thus considerably diminishing Britain's influence on Iran for years to come. Operation Ajax and the fall of Prime Minister Mosaddegh was perhaps the last of the large British involvements in Iranian politics in the Pahlavi era. The British forces began to withdraw from Persian Gulf in 1968. This was done out of economic considerations as the British simply could not continue to afford the costs of administration. (See also East of Suez). As part of this policy, in 1971, the then British government decided not to support the Shah and eventually, the patronage of the United Kingdom ended, and consequently, this role was filled by the US.

=== The Islamic Republic ===
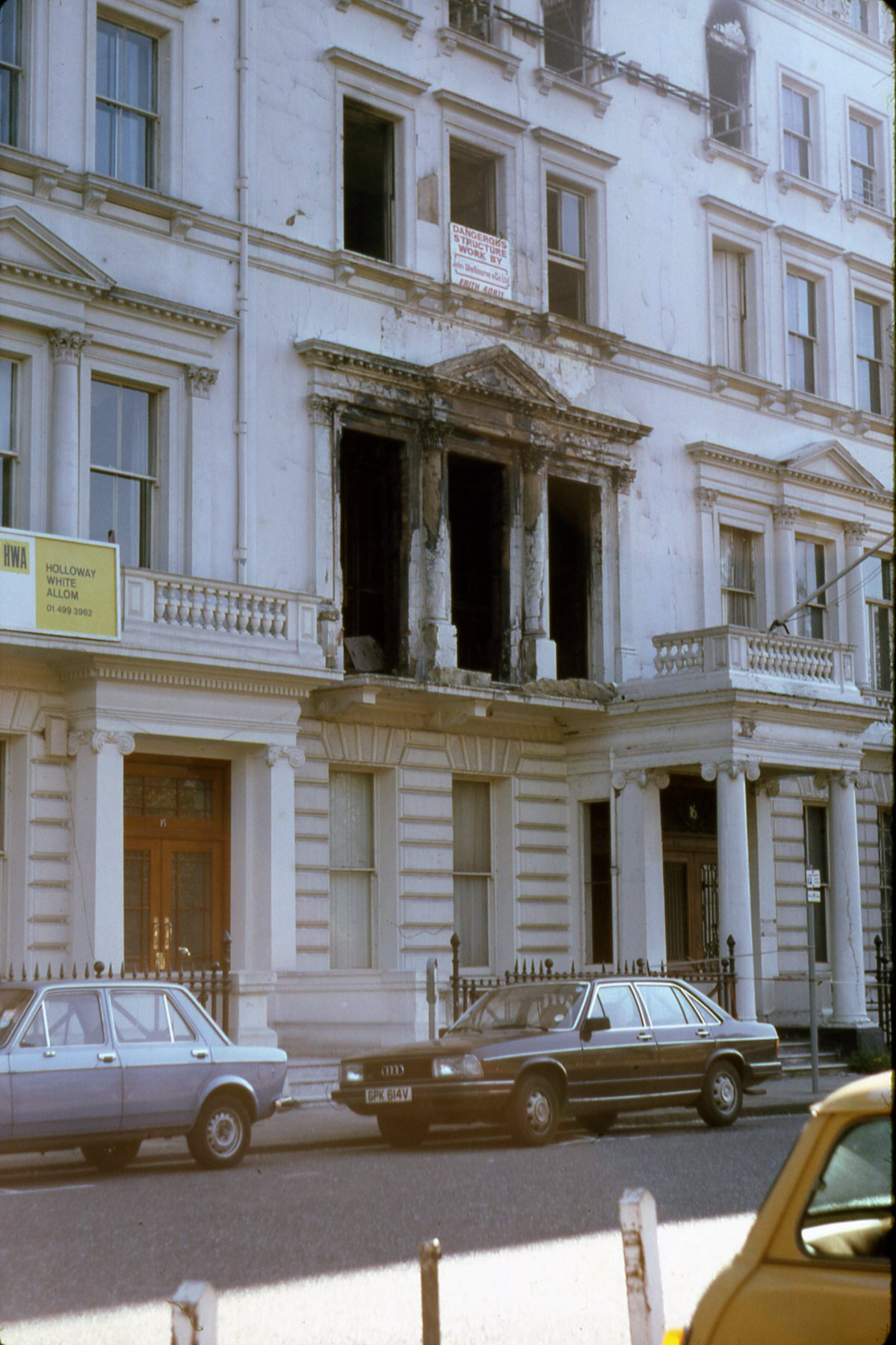
The Iranian embassy in London seen here damaged by fire in May 1980 as a result of the Iranian Embassy siege.

On 30 April 1980, the Iranian Embassy in London was taken over by a six-man terrorist team holding the building for six days until the hostages were rescued by a raid by the SAS. After the Revolution of Iran in 1979, Britain suspended all diplomatic relations with Iran. Britain did not have an embassy until it was reopened in 1988. A year after the re-establishment of the British embassy in Tehran, Ruhollah Khomeini issued a fatwa ordering Muslims across the world to kill British author Salman Rushdie. Diplomatic ties with London were broken off only to be resumed at a chargé d'affaires level in 1990.

== Current relations ==
=== Post-Cold War ===
Relations normalized in 1997 during President Mohammad Khatami's reformist administration, with Jack Straw becoming the first high-ranking British politician to visit Tehran in 2001 since the revolution. A setback occurred in 2002 when David Reddaway was rejected by Tehran as London's ambassador, on charges of being a spy.

In February 2004, following the earthquake in Bam, Prince Charles met President Mohammad Khatami in Tehran before travelling to Bam.

==== 2004 Iranian seizure of Royal Navy personnel ====
On 21 June 2004, eight sailors and Royal Marines were seized by forces of the Revolutionary Guards' Navy while training Iraqi river patrol personnel in the Persian Gulf. The sailors were pardoned and attended a goodbye ceremony with President Ahmadinejad shortly after they were released.

=== Political tension ===
British exports to Iran increased during the first years of the 21st century. A UK Trade & Investment press officer said Iran had become more attractive as it pursued a more liberal economic policy. However, following Mahmoud Ahmadinejad’s 2005 election and amid a sharpening standoff between Iran and the United States–European Union over Iran’s nuclear program, prospects for improving Iran-UK relations dimmed. The nuclear dispute became the principal obstacle.

A confidential letter by UK diplomat John Sawers to French, German and US diplomats, dated 16 March 2006, twice referred to the intention to have the United Nations Security Council refer to Chapter VII of the United Nations Charter in order to put pressure on Iran. Chapter VII describes the Security Council's power to authorize economic, diplomatic, and military sanctions, as well as the use of military force, to resolve disputes.

The Sunday Telegraph reported that a secret, high-level meeting would take place on 3 April 2006 between the UK government and military chiefs regarding plans to attack Iran. The Telegraph cited "a senior Foreign Office source" saying that "The belief in some areas of Whitehall is that an attack is now all but inevitable. There will be no invasion of Iran but the nuclear sites will be destroyed." The BBC reported a denial that the meeting would take place, but no denial of the alleged themes of the meeting, by the UK Ministry of Defence, and that "there is well sourced and persistent speculation that American covert activities aimed at Iran are already underway".

==== Gholhak Garden ====
In 2006 a dispute about the ownership of Gholhak Garden, a large British diplomatic compound in northern Tehran was raised in the Iranian Parliament when 162 MPs wrote to the speaker. The British Embassy have occupied the site since at least 1934 and assert that they have legal ownership but the issue was raised again in 2007 when a group of MPs claimed that the ownership papers for the site were unlawful under the laws extant in 1934. As of October 2011, it is still British.

==== 2007 Iranian arrest of Royal Navy personnel ====
On 23 March 2007 fifteen Royal Navy personnel were seized by the naval forces of the Iranian Revolutionary Guard for allegedly having strayed into Iranian waters. Eight sailors and seven Royal Marines on two boats from HMS Cornwall were detained at 10:30 local time by six Guard boats of the IRGC Navy. They were subsequently taken to Tehran. Iran reported that the sailors are well. About 200 students targeted the British Embassy on 1 April 2007 calling for the expulsion of the country's ambassador because of the standoff over Iran's capture of 15 British sailors and marines. The protesters chanted "Death to Britain" and "Death to America". Speculation on the Iranians' motivations for this action ran rampant; with the Iranians under tremendous pressure on a number of fronts from the United States, the Revolutionary Guard Corps could have been responding to any one of a number of perceived threats.

On 3 April 2007, Prime Minister Tony Blair advised that "the next 48 hours will be critical" in defusing the crisis. At approximately 1:20 PM GMT, Iran's president announced that the 8 sailors would be 'pardoned'. The following day, he announced all 15 British personnel would be released immediately "in celebration of the Prophet's birthday and Easter."

==== 2007 Nuclear policy disagreements ====
On March 18, 2007, Iran, under fire from Western powers over its atomic program, criticized Britain's plans to renew its nuclear arsenal as a "serious setback" to international disarmament efforts. Britain's parliament backed Prime Minister Tony Blair's plans to renew the country's Trident missile nuclear weapons system.

"Britain does not have the right to question others when they're not complying with their obligations" referring to the obligation by the U.K., United States, Russia and France to disarm under the NPT accord and "It is very unfortunate that the UK, which is always calling for non-proliferation not only has not given up the weapons but has taken a serious step toward further development of nuclear weapons," Iran's envoy to the International Atomic Energy Agency, told a conference examining the Trident decision.

==== Asylum ====
On 14 March 2008, Britain said it would reconsider the asylum application of Mehdi Kazemi, a gay Iranian teenager who claimed he would be persecuted if he was returned home. He had fled to the Netherlands and sought asylum there; however, the Dutch government turned him down, saying the case should be dealt with in Britain, where he first applied. He was granted asylum by Britain in 2008.

==== Arms sales ====
Despite the political pressure and sanctions, a probe by customs officers suggests that at least seven British arms dealers have been supplying the Iranian air force, its elite Revolutionary Guard Corps, and the country's controversial nuclear ambitions. A UK businessman was caught smuggling components for use in guided missiles through a front company that proved to be the Iranian Ministry of Defence. Another case involves a group that included several Britons which, investigators alleged, attempted to export components intended to enhance the performance of Iranian aircraft. Other examples involve a British millionaire arms dealer caught trading machine-guns used by the SAS and capable of firing 800 rounds a minute with a Tehran-based weapons supplier.

In mid-2008, amid speculation about possible U.S.–Israeli strikes on Iran, an Iranian Foreign Ministry official, Wahid Karimi, was quoted as suggesting that targeting London could deter an attack; no such incident occurred.

=== 2009 Iranian election controversy ===
In the aftermath of the disputed 2009 Iranian presidential election and the protests that followed, UK-Iran relations were further tested. On 19 June 2009, the Supreme Leader of Iran Ali Khamenei described the British Government as the "most evil" of those in the Western nations, accusing the British government of sending spies into Iran to stir emotions at the time of the elections, although it has been suggested by British diplomats that the statement was using the UK as a "proxy" for the United States, in order to prevent damaging US–Iranian relations. Nonetheless, the British Government, unhappy at the statement, summoned the Iranian ambassador Rasul Movaheddian to the Foreign Office to lodge a protest. Iran then proceeded to expel two British diplomats from the country, accusing them of "activities inconsistent with their diplomatic status". On 23 June 2009, the British Government responded, expelling two Iranian diplomats from the United Kingdom. Prime Minister Gordon Brown stated that he was unhappy at having to take the action, but suggested there was no option after what he described as 'unjustified' actions by Iran. On 24 June 2009, Iranian Foreign Minister Manouchehr Mottaki announced that the country was considering 'downgrading' its ties with the UK.

Four days later, Iranian authorities arrested several local British embassy employees in Tehran, alleging their "considerable role" in the recent unrest. The UK demanded their immediate release, calling the accusations baseless, and the EU warned of a “strong response” under international law if they were not freed. UK foreign secretary David Miliband praised the bravery of Iranians who took part in the opposition demonstrations; in response, Iran summoned the British ambassador to lodge a formal protest. Most of the detained employees were freed within days; the last one was released after a bail had been paid.

Queen's College, Oxford created the Neda Agha-Soltan Graduate Scholarship in 2009, named after Neda Agha-Soltan, who died in the protests after the election. Iran's embassy in London, in a letter signed by deputy ambassador Safarali Eslamian, disputed the circumstances of her death and accused the college of politicising the case and echoing alleged British interference. According to The Times, UK diplomatic sources said the award further strained relations with Iran; officials would have advised against it as provocative and unhelpful to efforts to secure the release of detained local embassy staff in Tehran. The college said the scholarship was not a political act and that refusing the initial donations would also have been a political decision.

=== 2009 international arbitration court ruling ===
In April 2009 the British government lost its final appeal in the arbitration court of the International Chamber of Commerce at The Hague against a payment of £400 million to Iran. The money is compensation for an arms deal dating from the 1970s which then did not come about due to the occurrence of the Iranian Revolution. The Shah's government had ordered 1,500 Chieftain tanks and 250 Chieftain armoured recovery vehicles (ARVs) in a contract worth £650 million, but only 185 vehicles had been delivered before the revolution occurred. The contract also covered the provision of training to the Iranian army and the construction of a factory near Isfahan to build tank parts and ammunition. In order to recover some of the costs 279 of the Chieftains were sold to Jordan and 29 of the ARVs to Iraq, who used them against Iran in the Iran–Iraq War. The UK continued to deliver tank parts to Iran after the revolution but finally stopped following the outbreak of the Iranian hostage crisis in 1979.

After the arbitration, the UK settled the debt in March 2022, authorising a £393.8 million payment. The government said the transfer complied with sanctions and was earmarked for humanitarian purposes.

=== 2011 attack on the British Embassy ===
On 28 November 2011, in response to joint U.S., UK, and Canadian sanctions, Iran downgraded relations with the United Kingdom, expelling the British ambassador. The next day, despite heavy police resistance, protesters, including students and Basiji, stormed two compounds of the British embassy in Tehran, smashing windows, ransacking offices, burning documents and a British flag, and forcing staff to flee. On 30 November 2011, in response to the attack, the UK closed its embassy in Tehran and ordered the Iranian embassy in London closed. Foreign secretary William Hague announced that all Iranian diplomats were expelled within 48 hours. The British Foreign Office called the attack "utterly unacceptable."

From July 2012 until October 2013, British interests in Iran were maintained by the Swedish embassy in Tehran while Iranian interests in the United Kingdom were maintained by the Omani embassy in London.

=== Since 2011 ===
The UK defence secretary Philip Hammond warned that Britain might take military action against Iran if it carries out its threat to block the Strait of Hormuz. He said any attempt by Iran to block the strategically important waterway in retaliation for sanctions against its oil exports would be "illegal and unsuccessful" and the Royal Navy would join any action to keep it open. British defence officials met US Secretary of Defense Leon Panetta on 6 January to criticize other members of the NATO for not being willing to commit resources to joint operations, including in Libya and Afghanistan. The following day, UK officials reported its intention to send its most powerful naval forces to the Persian Gulf to counter any Iranian attempt to close the Strait of Hormuz. The Type 45 destroyer HMS Daring would arrive in the Gulf by the end of January. According to officials, the ship is capable of shooting down "any missile in Iran's armoury."

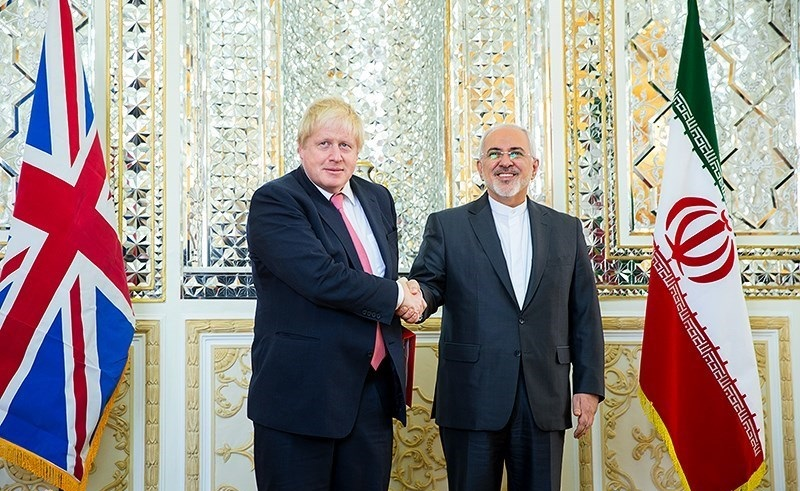
Iranian foreign minister Mohammad Javad Zarif with UK foreign secretary Boris Johnson, 9 December 2017

In July 2013, the UK considered opening better relations with Iran "step-by-step" following the election of President Hassan Rouhani, and in October of the same year, both countries announced that they would each appoint a chargé d'affaires to work toward resuming full diplomatic relations. This was done on 20 February 2014, and the British government announced in June 2014 that it would soon re-open its Tehran embassy. Embassies in each other's countries were simultaneously reopened in 2015. The ceremony in Tehran was attended by UK foreign secretary Philip Hammond, the first British foreign secretary to visit Iran since Jack Straw in 2003, who attended the reopening of the Iranian embassy in London, along with Iran's deputy foreign minister Mehdi Danesh Yazdi. Diplomat Ajay Sharma was named as the UK's charge d'affaires but a full ambassador was expected to be appointed in the coming months. In September 2016, both countries restored diplomatic relations to their pre-2011 level, with Nicholas Hopton being appointed British ambassador in Tehran.

According to a 2013 BBC World Service poll, only 5% of British people view Iran's influence positively, with 84% expressing a negative view. According to a 2012 Pew Global Attitudes Survey, 16% of British people viewed Iran favorably, compared to 68% which viewed it unfavorably; 91% of British people oppose Iranian acquisition of nuclear weapons and 79% approve of "tougher sanctions" on Iran, while 51% of British people support use of military force to prevent Iran from developing nuclear weapons.

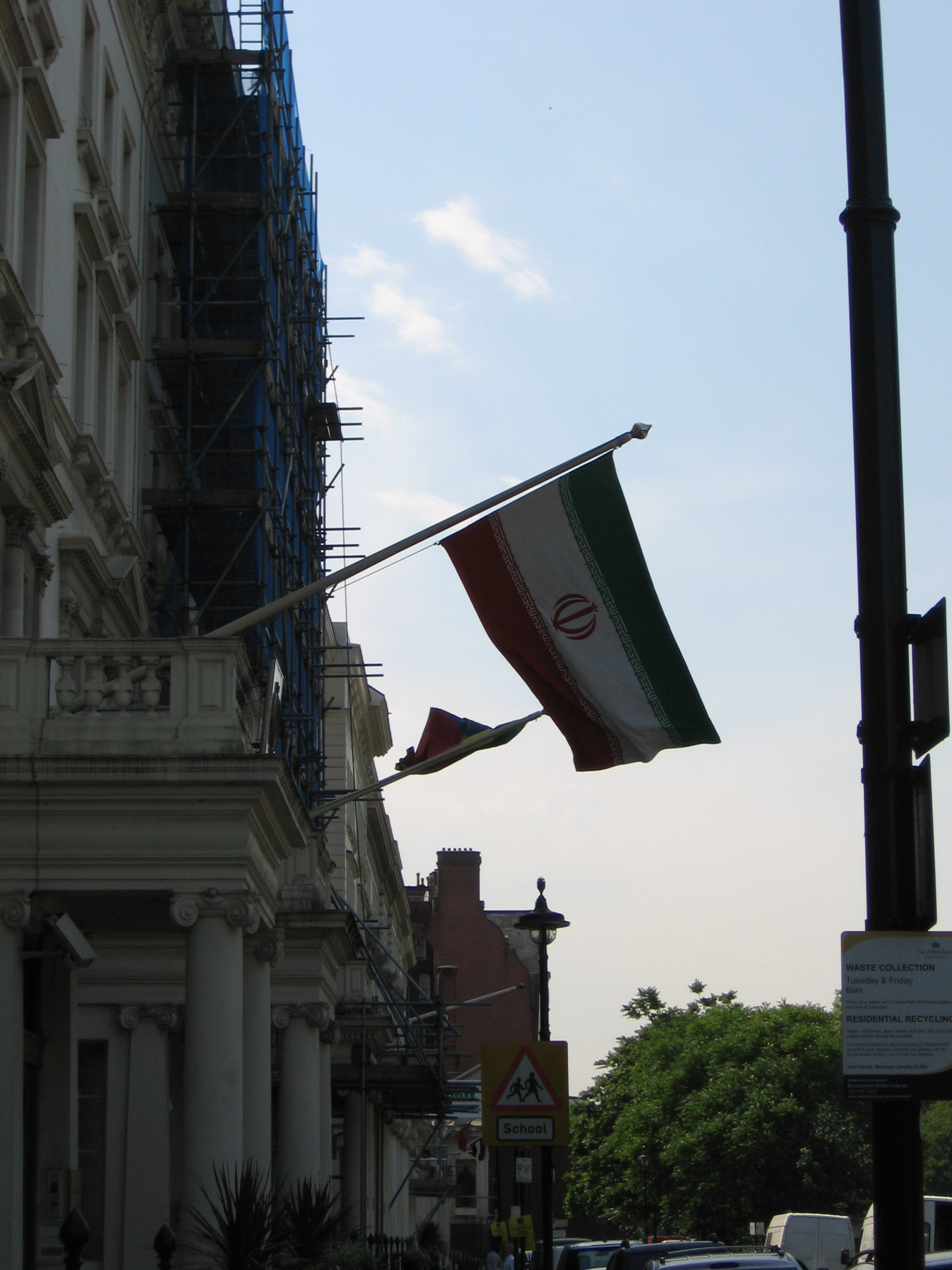
The Iranian Embassy in London

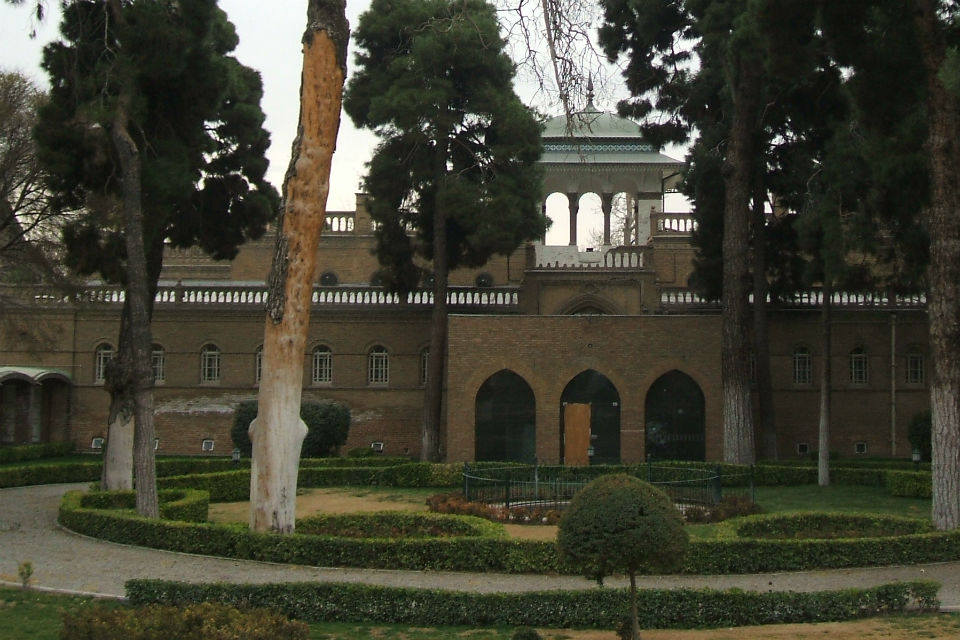
The British Embassy in Tehran

On February 20, 2014, the Iranian Embassy in London was restored and the two countries agreed to restart diplomatic relations. On August 23, 2015, the British Embassy in Tehran officially reopened.

British prime minister David Cameron and Iranian president Hassan Rouhani met on the sidelines of a United Nations in September 2014, marking the highest-level direct contact between the two countries since the 1979 Islamic revolution. The UK defence journal reported that in 2014, before Scotland’s independence referendum, Iran linked social media accounts spread memes and cartoons of UK prime minister David Cameron to promote a view of England being authoritarian. Iranian facebook pages “mimicked” Scottish media and thus were able to gain momentum.

In April 2016, an Iranian-British dual citizen Nazanin Zaghari-Ratcliffe was arrested while visiting Iran with her daughter. She was found guilty of "plotting to topple the Iranian government" in September 2016 and sentenced to 5 years in prison. Her husband led a concerted campaign to have her released maintaining that she "was imprisoned as leverage for a debt owed by the UK over its failure to deliver tanks to Iran in 1979." Her case has been described by rights groups and lawmakers as an instance of state hostage-taking. After her initial sentence expired in March 2021 she was charged and found guilty of propaganda activities against the government and sentenced to one year in prison. She was finally released on 16 March 2022, which was reported to be related to the UK paying a historic debt for tanks paid for by Iran in the 1970s but never delivered.

Theresa May, who succeeded Cameron as prime minister in July 2016, accused Iran of "aggressive regional actions" in the Middle East, including stirring trouble in Iraq, Lebanon and Syria, and this led to a deterioration in relations. In response, Iran's Supreme Leader Ali Khamenei condemned Britain as a "source of evil and misery" for the Middle East.

The British intelligence officials concluded that Iran was responsible for a cyberattack on the British Parliament lasting 12 hours that compromised around 90 email accounts of MPs in June 2017.

=== Tanker detention and Strait of Hormuz tensions ===
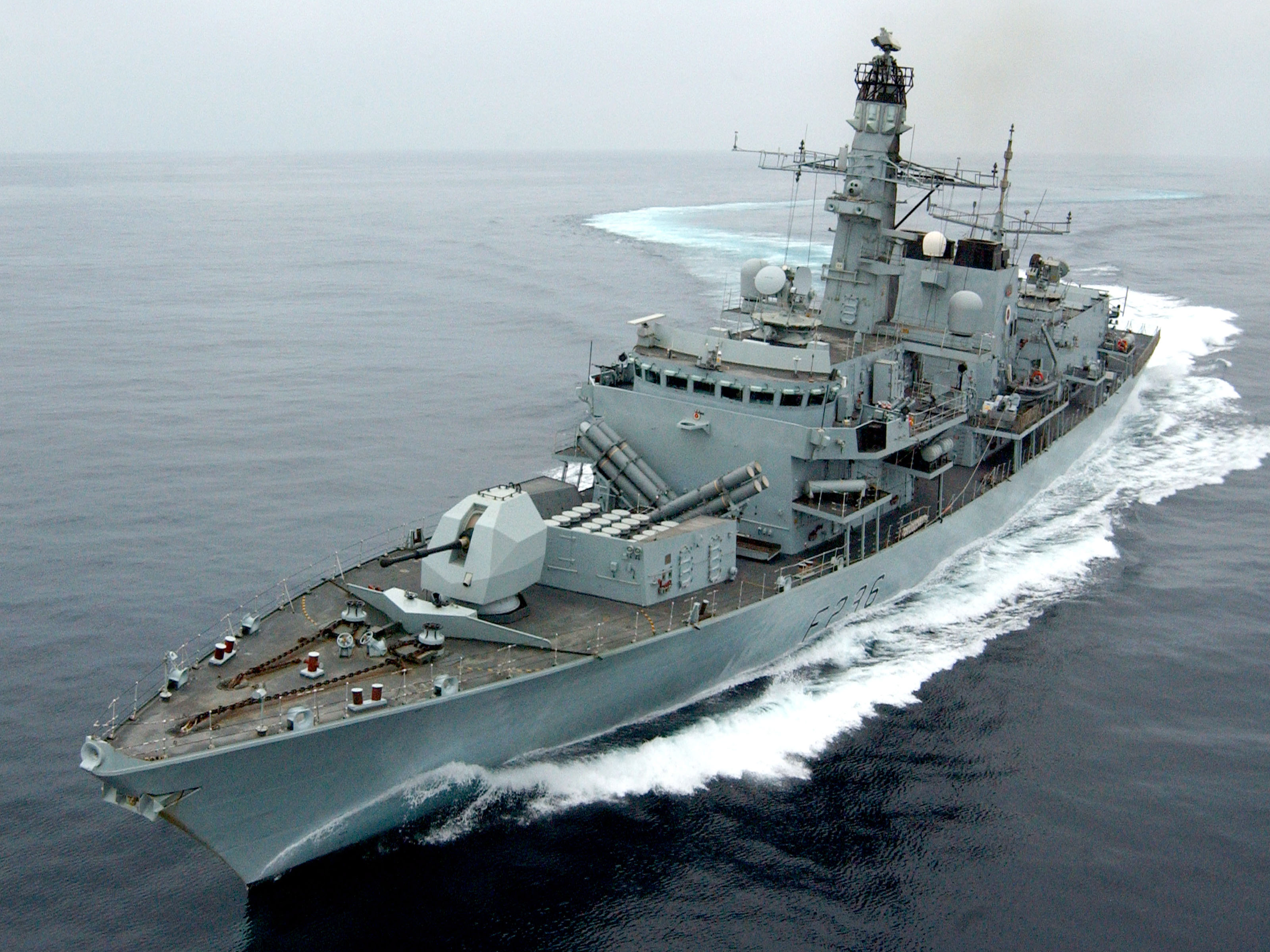
According to the British Royal Navy, HMS Montrose, seen here in 2005, foiled an attempted Iranian seizure of a British oil tanker while transiting through the Strait of Hormuz in July 2019.

On 4 July 2019, Royal Marines boarded the Iranian-owned tanker Grace 1 by helicopter off Gibraltar where it was detained. The reason given was to enforce European Union sanctions against Syrian entities, as the tanker was suspected of heading to Baniyas Refinery named in the sanctions that concern Syrian oil exports. Gibraltar had passed regulations permitting the detention the day before. Spain's foreign minister Josep Borrell stated that the detention was carried out at the request of the United States. An Iranian Foreign Ministry official called the seizure "piracy," stating that the UK does not have the right to implement sanctions against other nations "in an extraterritorial manner".

On 10 July 2019, tensions were raised further when boats belonging to Iran's Islamic Revolutionary Guard Corps approached a British Petroleum tanker, British Heritage, impeding it while it was transiting the Strait of Hormuz. The Royal Navy frigate HMS Montrose positioned themselves between the boats and ship so that it could continue its journey.

On 14 July 2019, British foreign secretary Jeremy Hunt said Grace 1 could be released if the UK received guarantees the oil — 2.1 million barrels worth — would not go to Syria.

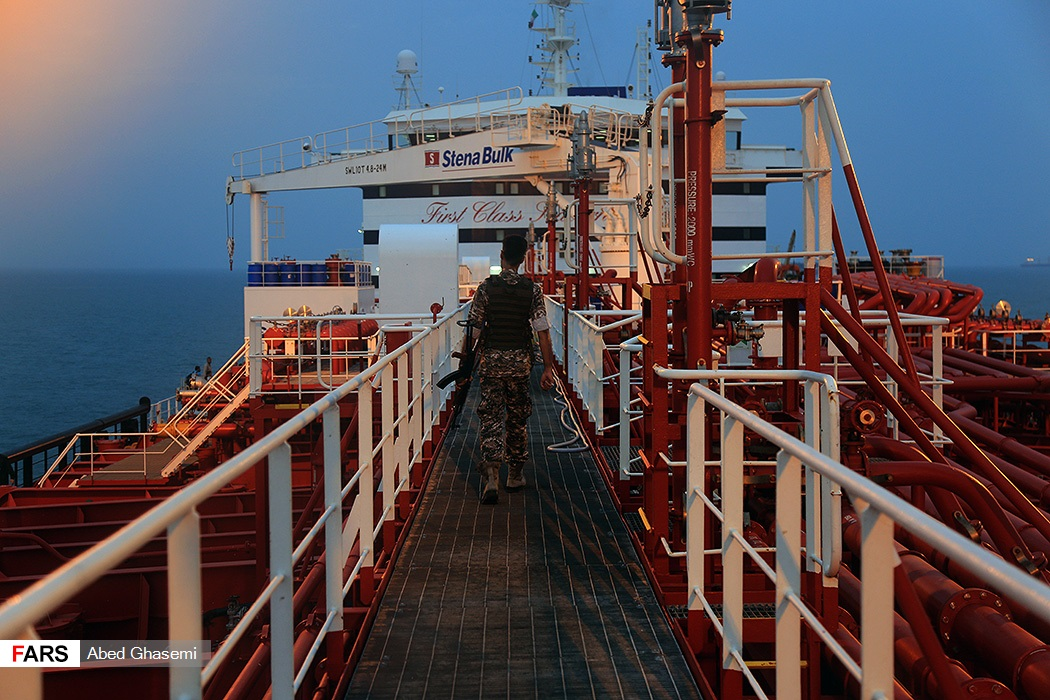
Stena Impero ship under control by NEDSA soldiers

On 19 July 2019, Iran media reported that the Swedish owned but British-flagged oil tanker Stena Impero had been seized by the Iranian Revolutionary Guard in the Strait of Hormuz. A first tanker, MV Mesdar, which was a Liberian-flagged vessel managed in the UK, jointly Algerian and Japanese owned, was boarded but later released. Iran stated that the British-flagged ship had collided with and damaged an Iranian vessel, and had ignored warnings by Iranian authorities. During the incident HMS Montrose was stationed too far away to offer timely assistance; when the Type 23 frigate arrived it was ten minutes too late. HMS Montrose was slated to be replaced by HMS Duncan, however in light of events it was decided that both ships would subsequently be deployed together.

External videos
- Radio exchanges reveal Iran-UK confrontation before oil tanker was seized, YouTube video

On 15 August 2019 Gibraltar released Grace 1 after stating that it had received assurances she would not go to Syria. The Iranian government later stated that it had issued no assurances that the oil would not be delivered to Syria and reasserted its intention to continue supplying oil to the Arab nation. On 26 August, Iranian government spokesman Ali Rabiei announced that the 2.1 million barrels of crude had been sold to an unnamed buyer, in either Kalamata, Greece or Mersin, Turkey. A US court issued a warrant of seizure against the tanker because it was convinced that the tanker was owned by the IRGC, which is deemed by Washington a foreign terrorist organization.

On 15 August 2019 the UK's new Boris Johnson-led government agreed to join the U.S. in its Persian Gulf maritime security Operation Sentinel, abandoning the idea of a European-led naval protection force.

On 4 September 2019 Iran released seven of the 23 crew members of the British-flagged oil tanker Stena Impero, which the Iranian forces had detained in August. The Iranian Foreign Ministry spokesman Abbas Mousavi stated that they have been released on humanitarian grounds. He said that their problem was the violation committed by the ship. On 23 September, the Iranian authorities announced that the British-flagged tanker Stena Impero, which they had captured on July 19 in the Strait of Hormuz, was free to leave. According to the government spokesperson Ali Rabiei informed that the legal process concluded and all the conditions to let the oil tanker go were also fulfilled. However, on September 24, it was reported that despite raising a green signal for the British tanker to leave the port, it remained in Iran waters. Swedish owner of Stena Impero, Erik Hanell said that they had no idea why the tanker was still there. On 27 September, the Stena Impero departed from Iranian waters and made its way to Port Rashid in Dubai. All of the remaining crew members who were still detained by Iran were released as well. The ship was also able to transmit location signals before arriving at Port Rashid, Dubai, after which the remaining crew members started undergoing medical checkups. The same day, HMS Duncan returned to Portsmouth.

In March 2022, the UK settled a £400 million debt to Iran, in order to secure the release of dual British-Iranian Nationals of Nazanin Zaghari-Ratcliffe and Anoosheh Ashoori. Iran also furloughed the tri-national Morad Tahbaz, but returned him to detention two days later. He was ultimately freed from imprisonment in Iran on September 18, 2023, as part of an Iran–United States prisoner release deal. On 14 January 2023, Iran executed dual British-Iranian Alireza Akbari.

In the wake of the release of Zaghari-Ratcliffe and Ashoori, the House of Commons Foreign Affairs Committee opened an inquiry into "state hostage diplomacy” and later issued its report, Stolen years. The Committee concluded that the government had mishandled such cases and urged a zero-tolerance approach. It recommended the government to: clearly identify and label state-hostage cases early; appoint a director for arbitrary and complex detentions with a direct line to the prime minister; set referral criteria and guidance on diplomatic protection; report to Parliament annually; use legal tools including Magnitsky-style sanctions; and coordinate more closely with partners under the Declaration on Arbitrary Detention in State-to-State Relations.

On 7 July 2022, The Royal Navy of Britain reported that one of its warships had arrested smugglers in international waters south of Iran early this year after seizing Iranian armaments, including surface-to-air missiles and cruise missile engines.

=== 2023 sanctions on Iran ===
In April 2023, the European Union, along with Britain, imposed sanctions on over 30 Iranian officials and organizations, including units of the revolutionary guards, due to their involvement in human rights abuses during the crackdown on the Mahsa Amini protests. In response, Iran threatened sanctions of their own.

In July 2023 the UK government said it planned to sanction officials from Iran. The UK's foreign secretary said that since 2022 there had been "15 credible threats by Iran's regime to kill or kidnap Britons or UK-based people".

=== 2024-present ===
In January 2024, the UK government imposed sanctions on Unit 840 and several of its members, including Mohammad Reza Ansari, for their involvement in hostile activities, such as planning and conducting attacks, including assassinations and threats to life, in countries other than Iran, including the UK. This action was part of a broader effort to counter the Iranian regime's attempts to intimidate or kill British nationals or UK-linked individuals, with at least 15 such threats reported since January 2022. Social media accounts attempting to influence inner UK discource that are linked to Iran were discovered in 2024. These accounts amassed a 250,000 following in twitter and dissemenating messaging encourage Scottish independence from the United Kingdom.

On 28 November 2024, former British soldier Daniel Khalife was found guilty of spying for Iran. His first known contact with Iranian intelligence occurred in September 2018, soon after he joined the military. He also contacted a man linked to the Islamic Revolutionary Guard Corps (IRGC) via Facebook and further built relationships with other Iranian contacts. During his military service, Khalife photographed a list containing the names of 15 soldiers, including some members of the elite Special Air Service (SAS) and Special Boat Service (SBS); it is believed that he sent the list to his Iranian contacts and later deleted the correspondence. He also collected a "very large body of restricted and classified material" and appears to have sent Iran at least two classified documents, one of which containing information on drones, the other on "Intelligence, Surveillance & Reconnaissance". One forged document Khalife sent to the Iranians stated that the British government refused to negotiate the release of Nazanin Zaghari-Ratcliffe, thereby putting her in danger.

In January 2025, Craig and Lindsay Foreman were detained in Iran on undefined security charges, and later charged with espionage. The couple had embarked on a motorbike trip around the world, with plans to stay in Iran for only five days. Richard Ratcliffe has urged the UK government to act "more promptly" to help the British citizens currently detained in Iran, as it took the government six years to secure the release of his wife, Nazanin Zaghari-Ratcliffe. Mr. Ratcliffe also stated that traveling to Iran should be "a lot clearer" and that the Foreign Office travel guidelines should clearly reflect "the risks of hostage-taking." In mid-July 2025, the couple were still being held in custody.

In May 2025, British counterterrorism authorities arrested five Iranian nationals suspected of plotting an attack on the Israeli embassy in London, with indications pointing to Unit 840 as the orchestrators. The arrests, conducted across various UK cities, are part of one of the most significant counterterrorism operations in recent years.

On May 17 2025, three Iranians were charged in Britain with espionage charges, 550 MPs and Peers wrote a letter to the prime minister demanding ban on IRGC, criticising hijab and chastity laws, calling for Iranian regime change.

On 31 July 2025, the United Kingdom joined thirteen allies in a joint statement condemning what they described as a surge in assassination, kidnapping and harassment plots by Iranian intelligence services in Europe and North America.

In 2025, Iran was placed in the highest tier of the foreign influence register in 2025. British government adviser, Jonathan Hall said the “Faces ‘Extraordinary’ Threat from Russian and Iranian Plots”. Hall said Iran uses local criminals in order to perform intimidation, violence and espionage within the United Kingdom.” During the Iran Israel war, the UK defence journal found that social media accounts encouraging Scottish independence went silent after Israel hit the cyber infrastructure of the Islamic Revolutionary Guards Corps.

A recent Telegraph article reported that Iran is conducting a "shadow war" to influence and destabilize the United Kingdom through a mix of propaganda, illicit financial activity, and digital disinformation. According to the article, Iranian-linked media outlets, such as Press TV, continue to promote state narratives online despite being banned from broadcasting in the UK. Financial institutions like Melli Bank and Bank Saderat, both previously sanctioned, still operate in London and have drawn concern for alleged ties to militant financing. Critics argue that the UK government’s response has been insufficient, leaving the country vulnerable to ongoing foreign influence.

In February 2026, the British government sanctioned ten Iranian officials, including police chiefs and IRGC members, as well as the Law Enforcement Forces of the Islamic Republic of Iran (FARAJA), for their role in the brutal suppression of Iranian protesters and in response to the 2026 Iran massacres.

During the 2026 Israeli–United States strikes on Iran, Prime Minister of the United Kingdom Keir Starmer called the Iranian regime "utterly abhorrent", and said that it had backed more than 20 "potentially lethal attacks" in the UK over the last year. He clarified that "it is clear they must never be allowed to develop a nuclear weapon. That remains the primary aim of the United Kingdom and our allies, including the US."

On 6 March 2026, UK counter-terrorism police officers arrested four men in London as part of an ongoing investigation under the National Security Act 2023. The suspects (Iranian national and three dual British-Iranian citizens) are accused of assisting Iran's foreign intelligence service by conducting surveillance on members, locations, and individuals connected to Jewish communities, such as the one in London.

On 1 April, 2026 it was reported that two Iranian drones struck Castrol oil plant in Erbil, causing large fires around the facility.

On 1 November 2026, Iran’s Foreign Ministry announced reciprocal measures targeting three British institutions. It designated the United Kingdom’s Secret Intelligence Service (MI6) as a “hostile group” and the Royal Navy and Royal Air Force as “terrorist organizations” under Iranian law. The ministry said the measures had been adopted under a resolution of Iran’s Supreme National Security Council and had taken effect upon publication of its statement. On 20 November 2026, during an interview to Sky news, General Sir Rob Magowan revealed that the UK is conducting cyber operations against Iran, as well as other countries.

== Trade ==
The Herald Tribune on 22 January 2006 reported a rise in British exports to Iran from £296 million in 2000 to £443.8 million in 2004. A spokesperson for UK Trade and Investment was quoted saying that "Iran has become more attractive because it now pursues a more liberal economic policy". As of 2009, the total assets frozen in Britain under the EU (European Union) and UN sanctions against Iran are approximately £976m ($1.64 billion). In November 2011, Britain severed all ties with Iranian banks as part of a package of sanctions from the US, UK and Canada aimed at confronting Tehran's nuclear programme.

== Resident diplomatic missions ==
- the Islamic Republic of Iran has an embassy in London.
- the United Kingdom has an embassy in Tehran.

== See also ==
- Iranians in the United Kingdom
- Foreign relations of Iran
- Foreign relations of the United Kingdom
- 2011–12 Strait of Hormuz dispute
- British School of Tehran
- Old fox, a term used by Iranians to describe Britain
- Secret Intelligence Service
