= German Speaking Protestant Congregation in Iran =

Church in Tehran, Iran

Coordinates: 35.7709°N 51.4450°E

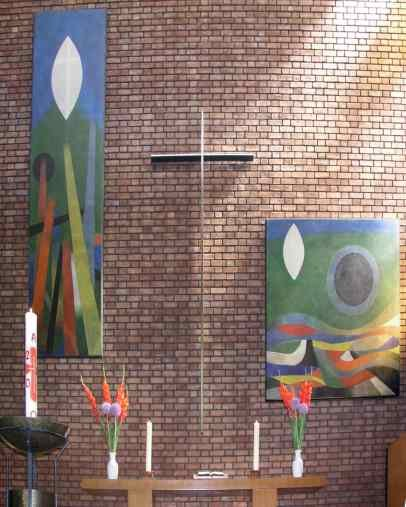
Interior of the German Speaking Church in Tehran (2011)

The German Speaking Protestant Congregation in Iran (Evangelische Gemeinde Deutscher Sprache in Iran) is a church in Tehran, Iran, that was founded by expatriates in 1957. It is affiliated with the Protestant Church in Germany.

The congregation acquired a plot of land and built Christ Church in Teheran (Christuskirche Teheran) in 1961. The church is a brick structure without a tower, seating up to 120 people. The building is located at Shahid Sheydayi Street 123/1 in the Gholhak area of northern Tehran, a center of German-speaking residents up to the 1979 Iranian Revolution, near the then-German School and other community institutions.

Protestant Christians founded it in Germany, Switzerland, and Austria in Iran. Since the Iranian revolution, this has been the only expatriate Protestant church in Tehran. It also serves English speakers. Services are conducted in German on Fridays, and there is an English language service on the first Friday of the month.

== See also ==
- List of religious centers in Tehran
- German Embassy School Tehran
