= École Française de Téhéran =

Location
- No 1553, Shariati Ave, Téhéran, IRAN 1939613663; Tehran; Iran
- Coordinates: 35.7805464°N 51.436357499999986°E

Information
- Established: 1995
- Website: efteheran.com

École Française de Téhéran (EFT) is a French international school located in Tehran, Iran. It is at Gholhak Garden, the British embassy residential complex, in the Gholhak area.

It serves from the maternelle (preschool) level, up to the lycée (senior high school) level. As of 2011 it had 256 students, including foreigners and Iranians. The school is on the property of the British Embassy.

It closed after the 2011 attack on the British Embassy in Iran; the attack occurred while the school was in session.

However, the school has since reopened.
