= 2011 attack on the Israeli Embassy in Egypt =

Protesters' attack on an embassy

2011 attack on the Israeli embassy in Egypt
- Part of events surrounding the 2011 Egyptian revolution
- Date: 9–10 September 2011
- Location: Israeli embassy at Giza, Egypt; 30°01′43.20″N 31°13′01″E
- Methods: Demonstrations, rioting, online activism, infiltration

Number
Several thousand protesters	

Casualties
- Deaths: 3 Egyptian protesters
- Injuries: ~1,049 Egyptian protesters

On 9 September 2011, several thousand protesters forcibly entered the Israeli embassy in Giza, Greater Cairo, after breaking down a recently constructed wall built to protect the compound. The protesters later broke into a police station and stole weapons, resulting in police using tear gas in an attempt to protect themselves. The demonstrators eventually broke through the security wall and entered the offices of the embassy. Six members of the embassy staff, who had been in a "safe room", were evacuated from the site by Egyptian commandos, following the personal intervention of United States President Barack Obama.

Following the attack, the Israeli deputy ambassador remained in Cairo; 85 staff members and their families returned to Israel. The Egyptian army declared a state of alert.

== Background ==
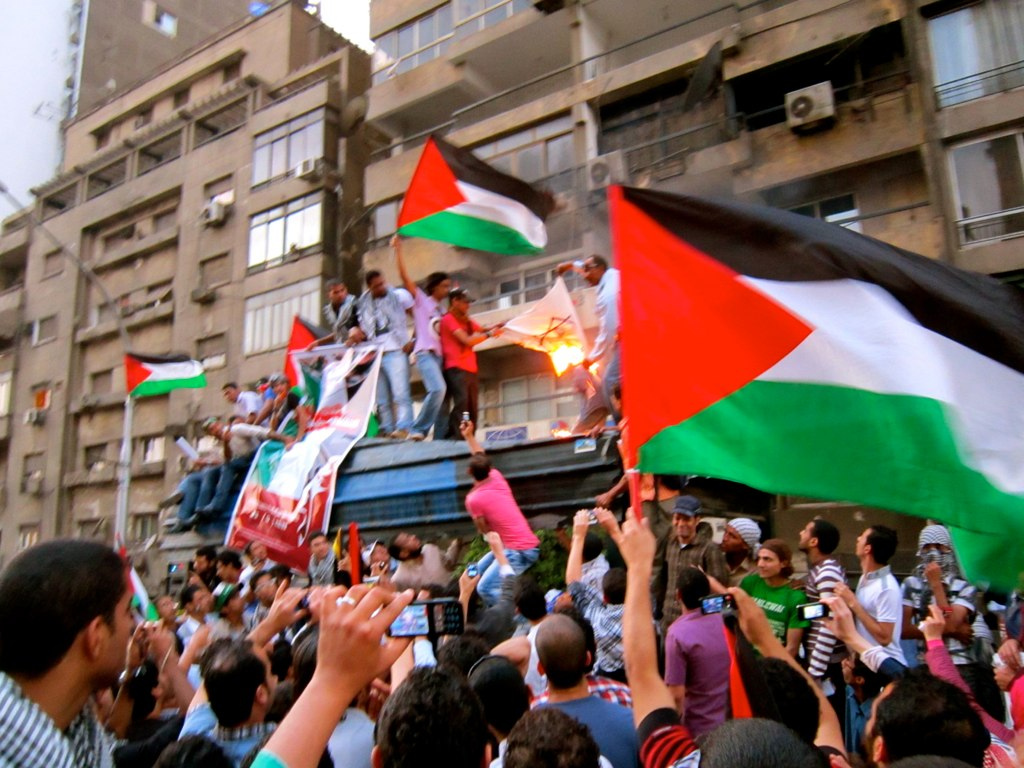
On 15 May 2011, Egyptian protesters waved Palestinian flags in front of the Israeli embassy in Giza as they burned a makeshift Israeli flag.

During 2011, relations between Israel and Egypt deteriorated after the resignation of Egyptian President Hosni Mubarak, reaching their lowest point since peace was established between the nations by the 1979 Egypt–Israel Peace Treaty. The Israeli-Egyptian border became a region of conflict and instability due to increased militant activity in Egypt's Sinai Peninsula, and anti-Israeli sentiment was expressed in protests by masses of Egyptians in the streets of Giza.

On 18 August 2011, a squad of militants crossed the border from the Sinai Peninsula into southern Israel, killing eight Israelis. The ensuing Israeli counter-terrorist operations in close proximity to the border resulted in the deaths of "at least three" Egyptian soldiers. The soldiers' deaths by Israeli fire ignited protests at the Israeli Embassy in Giza. During a demonstration on 20 August 2011, an Egyptian protester climbed 20 feet up the building's facade to remove the Israeli flag.

The Egyptian Supreme Council of the Armed Forces considered recalling the Egyptian ambassador in Tel Aviv. Eventually, Israel publicly apologized for the deaths of the Egyptian soldiers. Egypt stated that Israel's apology was "insufficient."

== The attack ==
On 9 September 2011, hundreds of Egyptian protesters began gathering outside of the Israeli embassy. Around 6:30 p.m. local time, they began to assault a concrete security perimeter wall with hammers and a battering ram. Egyptian authorities had erected the wall following intense protests in August.

=== Building infiltration ===
At 12:30 a.m. Saturday morning, several thousand protesters breached the security wall. By 1:00 a.m. they had entered the lobby and proceeded through the rest of the building. The demonstrators ransacked the embassy, located on the 20th and 21st floors of the building, and threw items including documents, some marked "confidential", from the windows of the building to the crowded street below. The documents were quickly scanned and publicly commented on. Israel later revealed that the remaining Israeli security staff had been separated from the rioters only by the steel door of a safe room in which they had taken refuge.

In Jerusalem, Israeli Prime Minister Benjamin Netanyahu and various other senior Israeli officials watched the events unfold from a direct feed from the surveillance cameras installed in the embassy.

Israeli Foreign Ministry spokesman Yigal Palmor estimated that about 3,000 protesters were involved in destroying the security wall. An Israeli diplomat condemned the attack as a "serious violation" of diplomatic behavior.

Immediately after the protesters had infiltrated the embassy, United States Secretary of Defense Leon Panetta received a call from Israeli Minister of Defense Ehud Barak asking for help. The United States assisted in assuring the protection of the Israeli embassy personnel. Prime Minister Netanyahu later emphasized that he "would like to thank the US President Barack Obama for his help" in securing the lives of the Israeli embassy staff.

=== Rescue of embassy staff and end of the riots ===
Six Israeli security staff who were on the premises hid inside a reinforced safe room. Egyptian commando forces entered the embassy building and rescued the six Israeli guards. All other embassy staff and their family members were escorted to Cairo International Airport. At 2:40 a.m., the Israeli ambassador and approximately 85 other Israeli diplomats and their family members arrived at the airport and were flown out of Egypt. Only the deputy Israeli ambassador remained in Egypt, staying at the United States embassy. A senior Egyptian security official stated that the Egyptian commandos had been sent to the embassy after Israeli Ambassador Itzhak Levanon spoke on the phone with an anonymous member of Egypt's ruling military council, and asked him to arrange the safe evacuation of the embassy staff.

The demonstration and ransacking of the embassy building continued into the early morning hours as the protesters burned tires and set several police cars on fire. The Egyptian police eventually suppressed the riots and dispersed the thousands of rioters by using tear gas and firing warning shots into the air.

Prime Minister Netanyahu and former Mossad director Efraim Halevy praised the actions of American president Obama in helping with the evacuation.

== Aftermath ==
Following the attack on the embassy, the Egyptian army heightened the state of alert in the country and reinstated martial law, otherwise known as State of Emergency, on a temporary basis.

On the morning of Saturday, 10 September, Egypt's ruling military council rejected resignation requests that had been submitted by Egyptian Prime Minister Essam Sharaf and several Egyptian ministers. Their request was made because of the failure to handle the disturbances.

One day after the attacks on the embassy, a group of reporters were attacked by a crowd of people still lingering near the scene of the riots. A reporter and producer were knocked to the ground and trampled, but managed to get to a vehicle in which they retreated, with protesters throwing stones at them. They were able to flee the area without sustaining any major injuries.

=== Arrests ===
In August 2012, an Egyptian court convicted 76 Egyptians who were linked to the attack on the Israeli embassy. 75 of those convicted received suspended one-year sentences, and one Egyptian, Omar Afifi who had fled abroad, who was tried in absentia was given a five-year prison term. Eight charges were listed by the court, including "an assault against diplomatic missions" and "sabotage".

== Official reactions ==
Involved parties

- Egypt: Following the attack on the Israeli Embassy in Giza, Information Minister Osama Heikal stated that Egypt is still committed to all of the international treaties to which it is a signatory, and added that Egypt is also committed to the safety of all foreign diplomats residing in the country. In addition, Heikal stated that measures would be taken to ensure no further disturbances would occur.
- Israel: During a televised press conference conducted on the evening of 10 September, Prime Minister Benjamin Netanyahu emphasized the need to maintain Israel's strategic relations with Egypt, which is crucial to the region's stability. In addition, he thanked the Egyptian commando unit for preventing a disaster. Netanyahu also stated that the peace agreement with Egypt will be maintained in spite of the violent protests.

International

- Bahrain: Foreign Minister Sheik Khalid ibn Ahmad Al Khalifah condemned the attack on the Israeli Embassy in Giza. The minister said that "the failure to defend the embassy building is a blatant violation of the 1961 Vienna Convention on Diplomatic Relations."
- Canada: Prime Minister Stephen Harper released a statement that said, "Our government strongly condemns the attack on the embassy of Israel in Egypt".
- Germany: Foreign Minister Guido Westerwelle released a statement in which he condemned the attack on the Israeli embassy. In addition, the statement said that he expects "the Egyptian authorities to provide for the security of the embassy in accordance with international obligations. Any further escalation of the situation must be avoided."
- Iran: Deputy head of the Majlis Committee on National Security and Foreign Policy Esmail Kowsari said that members of the Iranian parliament had expressed full support for the "ransacking" of the Israeli embassy in Cairo.
- United Kingdom: Prime Minister David Cameron condemned the attacks on the Israeli embassy, stating that Egypt is responsible for protecting diplomatic property. "I strongly condemn the attack on the Israeli Embassy in Cairo. We have urged the Egyptian authorities to meet their responsibilities under the Vienna Convention to protect diplomatic property and personnel, including the Israeli Embassy in Cairo. They have reassured us that they take these very seriously."
- United States: In a statement to the press, the White House said that President Barack Obama expressed his great concern about the situation at the embassy and the security of the Israelis serving there.

== See also ==
- 2011 attack on the British Embassy in Iran
- 2012 diplomatic missions attacks
