= Neda Agha-Soltan Graduate Scholarship =

Scholarship for post-graduate philosophy students at The Queen's College

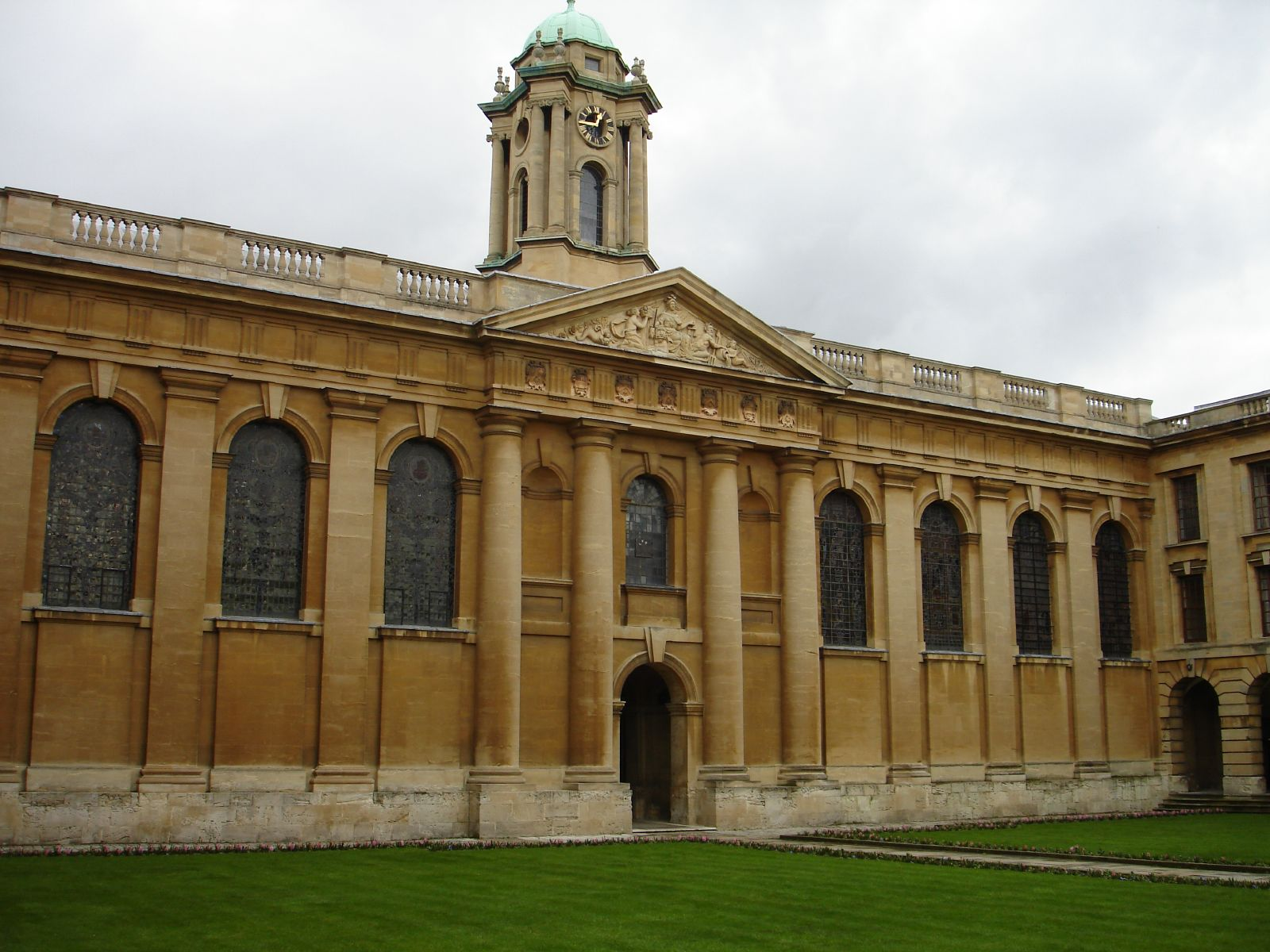
The Queen's College, Oxford, where a scholarship in the name of Neda Agha-Soltan was established in 2009

The Neda Agha-Soltan Graduate Scholarship is a scholarship for post-graduate philosophy students at The Queen's College, Oxford, with preference given to students of Iranian citizenship or heritage. It was established in 2009 following the death of Neda Agha-Soltan, an Iranian philosophy student, in the street protests that followed the disputed Iranian presidential election in 2009. The college received offers from two anonymous donors to establish a scholarship, followed by many individual donations from former students of Queen's and others to reach its £70,000 target to establish the scholarship on a permanent basis. The first recipient of the scholarship was Arianne Shahvisi, a philosophy student of Iranian descent, who described the award as "a great honour".

The establishment of the scholarship led to criticism from the Iranian government: the Iranian embassy in London told the college that the university was involved in a "politically motivated campaign ... in sharp contrast with its academic objectives". In response, The Times praised the scholarship in an editorial, saying that the establishment of the scholarship was indeed politically motivated, "and admirably so", given the government's reaction to her death and continuing problems in Iran. One British–Iranian student, Leyla Ferani, has said that the scholarship could be Agha-Soltan's "most important legacy". The college has denied that it took a political decision in establishing the scholarship, stating that it aims to attract and support the best students, and arguing that refusal of the donations would itself have been a political act. Anonymous British diplomatic sources were reported as saying that the creation of the scholarship had put "another nail into the coffin" of relations between Britain and Iran.

== Neda Agha-Soltan ==
Neda Agha-Soltan, a 26-year-old philosophy student, was shot and killed on 20 June 2009 during street protests in Iran that followed the disputed presidential election. Video footage of her death was seen around the world. In the words of The Times, she "became an emblem of the Iranian people's struggle for freedom, and her death a symbol of the government's brutality". Another writer has called her a "defining symbol of the protest movement in Iran".

== Scholarship ==
After Agha-Soltan's death, two anonymous British donors offered to donate £4,000 to establish a scholarship for post-graduate students of philosophy at The Queen's College, Oxford (one of the constituent colleges of the University of Oxford); the college's governing body accepted the offers. One of the initial donors has pledged a further £10,000 over five years. The college has said that the main donor was a British citizen and well known to Queen's. By November 2009, in the region of an additional £15,000 had been donated to the scholarship fund, some from former students of the college and some from members of the public without a connection to Queen's. A fundraising campaign targeting former philosophy students of the college led to further donations, which increased the fund to over £20,000 by Michaelmas Term of 2009. The appeal raised £70,000 to put the scholarship on a permanent financial footing; donors included people without connections to the college and some who the college said had taken "significant risks in order to donate".

The decision to name the scholarship after Agha-Soltan was that of the donors rather than the college: Paul Madden, the Provost of the college, said that "within reason" donors decided the name of a scholarship. The scholarship pays college fees of about £4,000 over a two-year period. It is open to all students at Queen's studying for post-graduate degrees in philosophy, with preference given to Iranian nationals or those with Iranian heritage. The first holder of the scholarship was Arianne Shahvisi, studying philosophy of physics, who is of Iranian descent. She said that it was "a great honour" to be awarded the scholarship, adding that she hoped she could "do justice" to Agha-Soltan's name. She was succeeded by an unnamed male student, studying political philosophy and the history of political thought.

== Iranian government reaction ==
The establishment of the scholarship drew a letter of protest to the college from the Iranian embassy in London. It was written in November 2009 and signed by the deputy ambassador, Safarali Eslamian. The letter disputed the circumstances of her death, and said that there was "supporting evidence indicating a pre-made scenario". Eslamain wrote, "It seems that the University of Oxford has stepped up involvement in a politically motivated campaign which is not only in sharp contract with its academic objectives, but also is linked with a chain of events in post-Iranian presidential elections blamed for British interference both at home and abroad". The letter also said that the "decision to abuse Neda's case to establish a graduate scholarship will highly politicise your academic institution, undermining your scientific credibility – along with British press which made exceptionally a lot of hue and cry on Neda's death – will make Oxford at odd [sic] with the rest of the world's academic institutions". Eslamain asked for the university's governing board to be informed of "the Iranian views", and finished by saying, "Surely, your steps to achieve your attractions through non-politically supported programmes can better heal the wounds of her family and her nation".

There was also a report of a demonstration outside the British Embassy in Tehran against the scholarship. A group of female protesters were said by the Iranian news agency Fars to have chanted "Death to Britain".

In response, Madden emphasised that the scholarship was to help Iranian students without adequate financial resources of their own to study at Oxford. He said that other universities were winning the competition to attract the best graduate students, adding that donations such as these were "absolutely vital" for the college to be able to "attract and retain the best young minds". A college spokesman said that the scholarship had not been set up as part of a political decision, and if the initial donations had been refused, this would have been interpreted as a political decision too. The university (which did not receive a letter of complaint from the embassy) made it clear that the decision to establish the scholarship was one for Queen's, not for the university, since the colleges are self-governing bodies.

== Other reaction ==
Arash Hejazi, an Iranian writer who was present at Soltan's death, praised the college for the scholarship. An unnamed Iranian academic said to The Times that the letter from the Iranian embassy showed that the death had damaged the Iranian government. A British-Iranian student, Leyla Ferani, writing in The Daily Telegraph, said that the establishment of the scholarship was "more than commendable", and "could prove to be a galvanising tool for the protestors". She said that "Oxford's move is as striking as it is heartening", adding that it "honours the whole student body in Iran which has been repressed and tortured by the Islamic Republic". She commented that "In one of Britain’s top universities, it will foster crucial awareness of the government's tyrannical attitude towards education", and said that the scholarship could be Soltan's "most important legacy".

A day after publishing the letter from the Iranian embassy, an editorial in The Times praised the college's actions. It described Soltan's death as a "brutal example" of a government's suppressing opposition, and said that the Iranian response to her death was giving the country the status of "international basket case". While the problems of Iran were no longer front-page news, it said, they still existed. In the circumstances, the editorial concluded, "A scholarship at The Queen’s College in memory of Neda Soltan is, indeed, politically motivated, and admirably so".

UK diplomatic sources, speaking anonymously to The Times, said that if the government had been asked, it would have advised against the creation of the scholarship, because Iran would see it as an act of provocation, and because it would interfere with efforts to free Iranians working for the British Embassy in Tehran who had been detained for participating in the post-election protests. The sources said the scholarship had put "another nail into the coffin" of relations between Britain and Iran.

== See also ==
Academic scholarships established in the honor of Mahsa Amini subsequent to the Death of Mahsa Amini leading to the Women, Life, Freedom Movement in Iran

1. Mahsa Amini Graduate Fellowship at Columbia University in the City of New York School of Engineering and Applied Sciences
2. Mahsa Amini Graduate Fellowship at University of California Santa Barbara
3. Women Life Freedom Scholarship at Dalhousie University
4. Mahsa Amini Scholarship at University of Windsor
5. Mahsa Amini Scholarship at Dawson College
