= German Embassy School Tehran =

Location
- Shariati, under the Sadr Bridge Shahid Keshani St. (Mahale Darbdowom) Tehran/Iran; Tehran; Iran
- Coordinates: 35°46′56.41″N 51°26′16.6″E

Information
- Type: Private School
- Established: 1907
- Principal: Harald Pröm
- Website: dbst.ir

The German Embassy School Tehran (German: Deutsche Botschaftsschule Teheran, DBST) is a German international school in Tehran which was founded in 1980 as a successor to the German School Tehran, which was once the largest German school abroad. The school serves kindergarten through Sekundarstufe II (senior high school). There is an international section serving nursery through class 8.

It shares its campus with the former British School, Tehran (BST). After the BST's closure in 2011, the DBST acquired the BST's assets and established an international section operating in the former BST campus.

Around 300 pupils were taught in the school year 2020/21.

== History ==
A cultural agreement between Germany and Iran led to the establishment of the first German school in Tehran in 1907. It was subsidized by the German government and the Persian government and was well equipped with laboratories, a school kitchen, sports facilities, a boarding school for foreign students and a teacher's house. Initially 300 students were taught, the majority of whom were Persians. The school grew to 700 students by World War I.

In 1932, the German colony in Tehran opened a German school for German-speaking children. This school had to close in World War II after the German teachers were interned after the occupation of the Allies in 1941. The development of German-Iranian schools was interrupted by the two world wars and the associated political effects. It was not until 1955 that a German school, the DST, could be reopened in Tehran. This school began its teaching with initially 100 students from the German colony but grew quickly and in 1976 had almost 2,000 students from kindergarten to grade 13, making it the largest and most renowned German school abroad. The DST was entitled to take the school-leaving qualifications recognized in Germany and in 1964 carried out a German Abitur examination in Tehran for the first time. During this time, the school was relocated from the city center to the Yakhchal Street in the Gholhak province, where many Germans and Swiss lived.

In the spring of 1980, the German school had to cease operations because the new regulations after the Islamic Revolution no longer allowed foreign schools to operate.

The school was once again relocated from the Gholhak province to the Residence of the British Embassy in the Shariati Street in the Dowlat district. The school closed for a few days after the attack on the British embassy on the 29th of November 2011 and the British embassy shut down their activities. Just a few months later after the summer vacation in September 1980, with the help of the German Embassy, the German Embassy School Tehran (DBST) was opened, offering classes for the remaining German-speaking children and other foreign children who wanted to attend a German school along with English language classes for the previous students of the BST.

== Famous former students ==
- Christopher Blenkinsop, Musician
- Jasmin Tabatabai, Actress and singer
- Sudabeh Mohafez, Writer/ Author

== See also ==
- Germany–Iran relations
- German Speaking Evangelical Church, Tehran
