= British School of Tehran =

Location
- Shahid Keshani St., Dr. Shariati Ave, Tehran 19395 Iran; Tehran; Iran
- Coordinates: 35.7809233°N 51.43864289999999°E

Information
- Opened: 2000
- Closed: 2011
- Website: web.archive.org/*/http://www.britishschooltehran.com/

The British School of Tehran (BST) was a British international school in Tehran, Iran.

The British and Dutch embassies in Tehran jointly established the school in 2000. During its life, the Ministry of Foreign Affairs (Iran) only permitted non-Iranian students to attend; students came from 32 countries as of 2010. Admissions priority was given to British and Dutch children.

It closed indefinitely after the 2011 attack on the British Embassy in Iran. The school board of trustees voted to have the school disestablished, with the end date being 31 December 2011. The German Embassy School Tehran (DBST) acquired the assets of the BST and established an international section in the former BST buildings. At the end of the school's life it had 117 students.
