= Tehran War Cemetery =

Commonwealth war graves cemetery in Iran

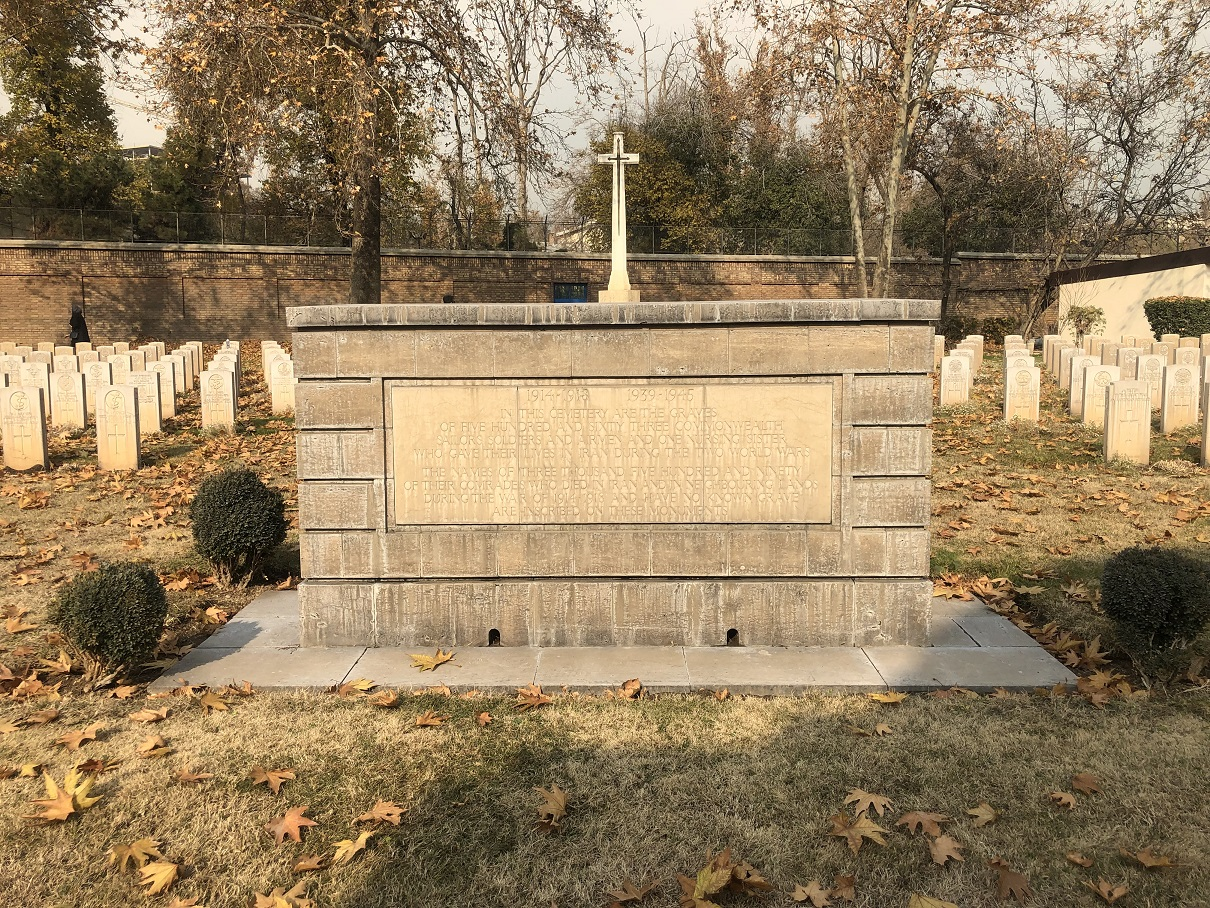
- Interactive map of Tehran War Cemetery

Details
- Established: 1962
- Location: Gholhak, Tehran
- Country: Iran
- Coordinates: 35.7765°N 51.4387°E
- Type: Military Cemetery
- Owned by: Commonwealth War Graves Commission
- Size: 20,000 m
- No. of graves: 551
- Website: Cemetery details. Commonwealth War Graves Commission.
- Find a Grave: Tehran War Cemetery

Tehran War Cemetery (Persian: گورستان کمیسیون جنگ‌های مشترک‌المنافع) is a war cemetery located in Gholhak Garden in the Iranian capital city of Tehran and located within the British Embassy residential compound and is where over 500 British and Commonwealth soldiers who perished in the First and Second World Wars are buried. The site includes the Tehran Memorial, dedicated to those who have no known grave or whose grave is unmaintained. The cemetery is managed by the Commonwealth War Graves Commission.

The cemetery also has markers for those who died in Iran and Russia without graves.

== Gallery ==
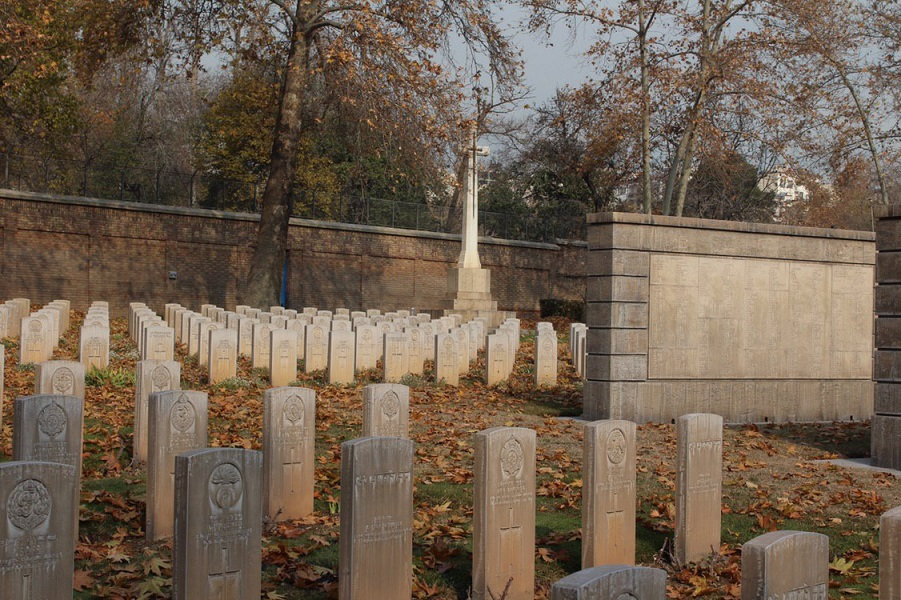
Tehran War Cemetery

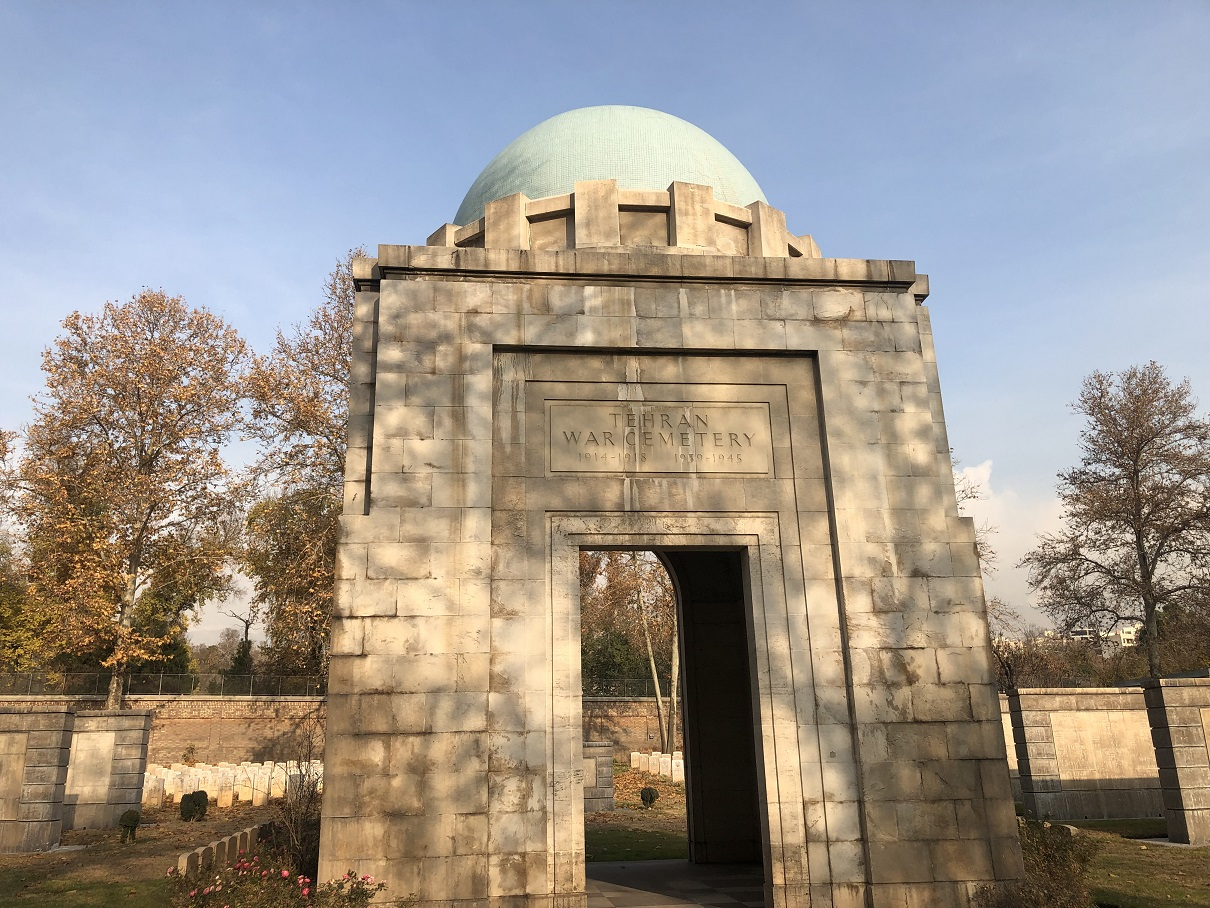

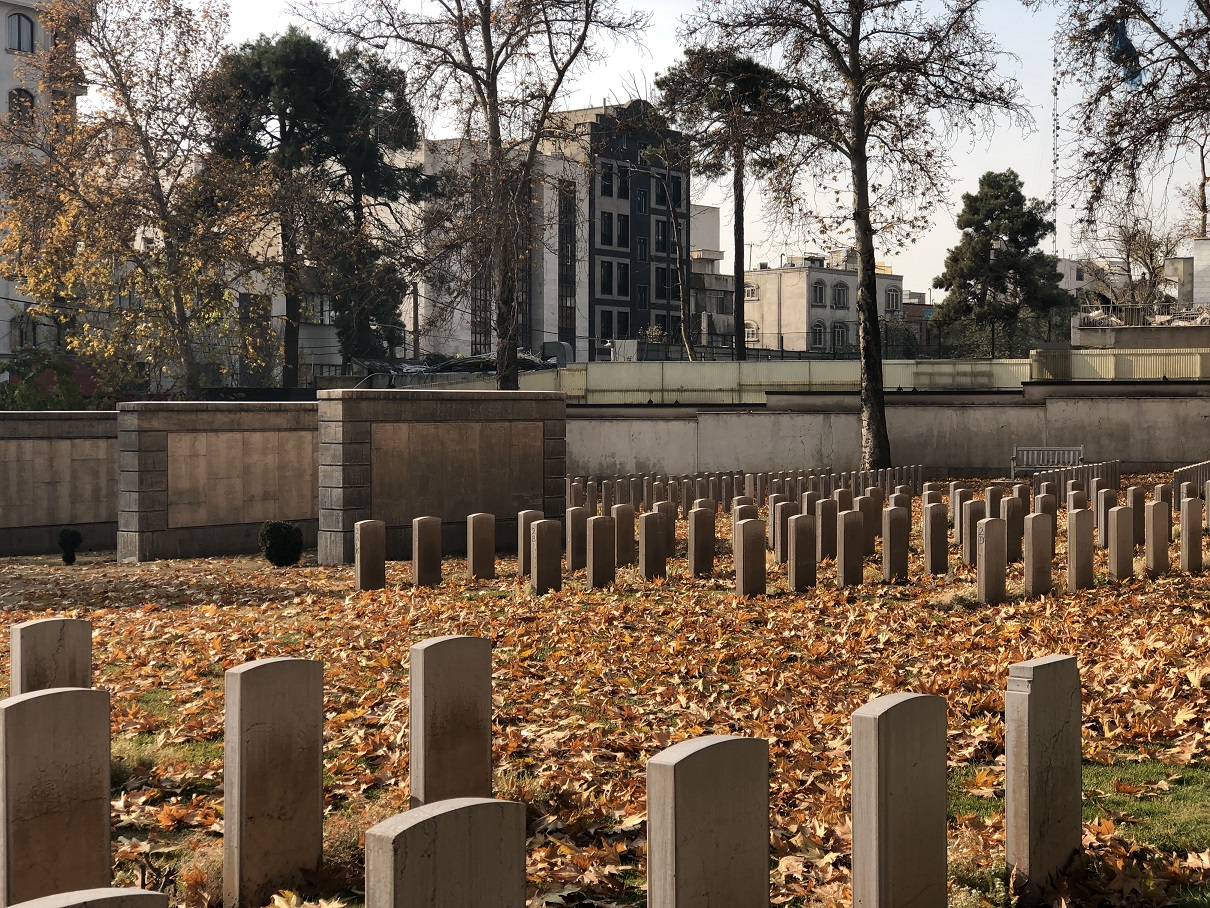

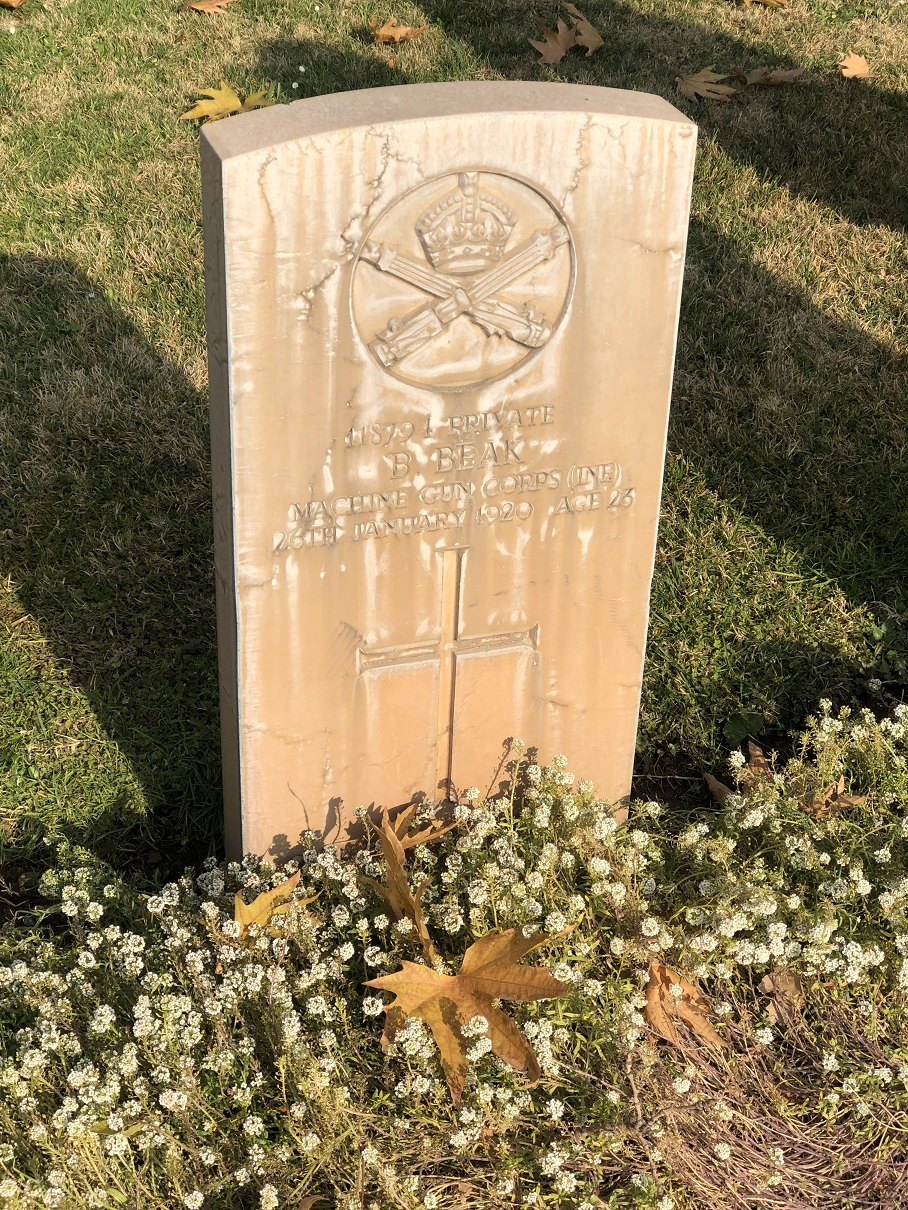

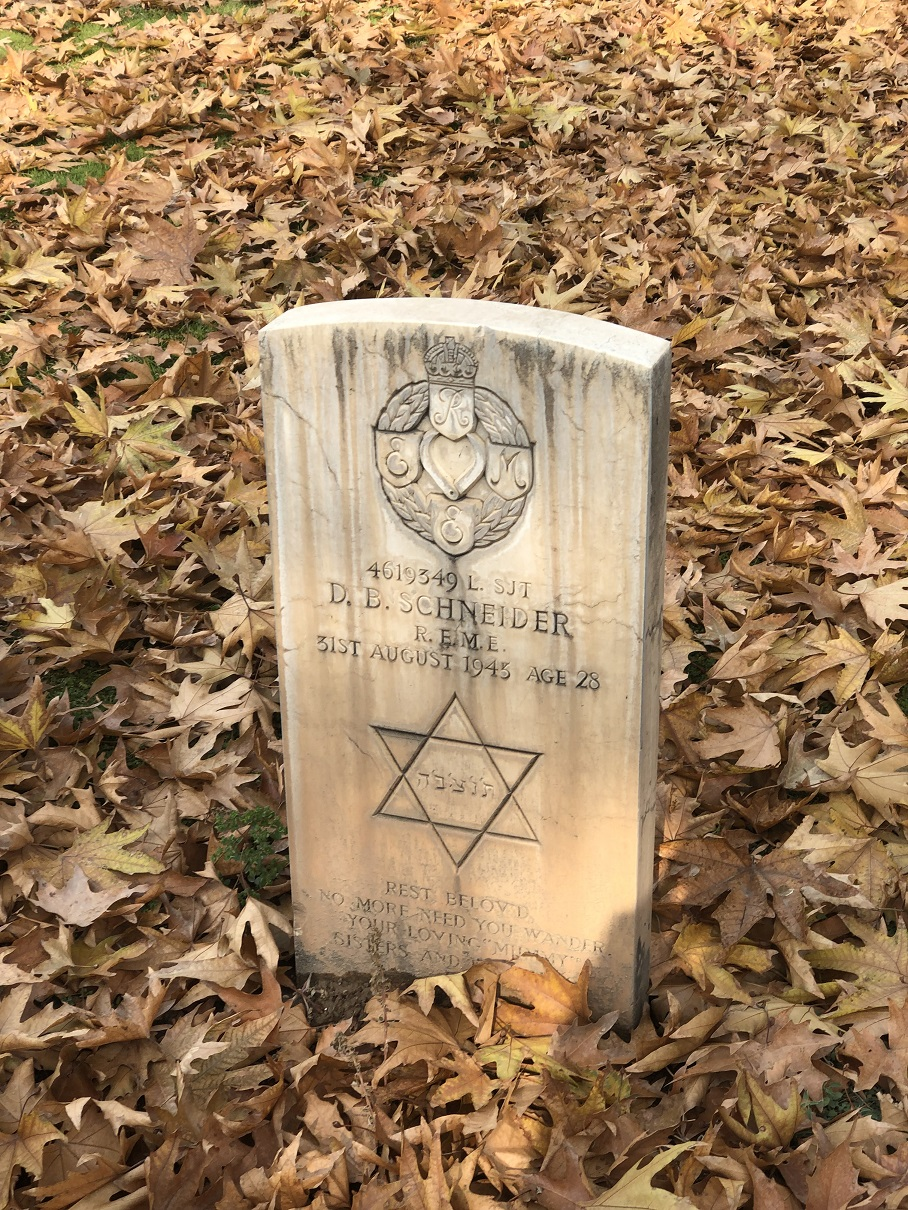

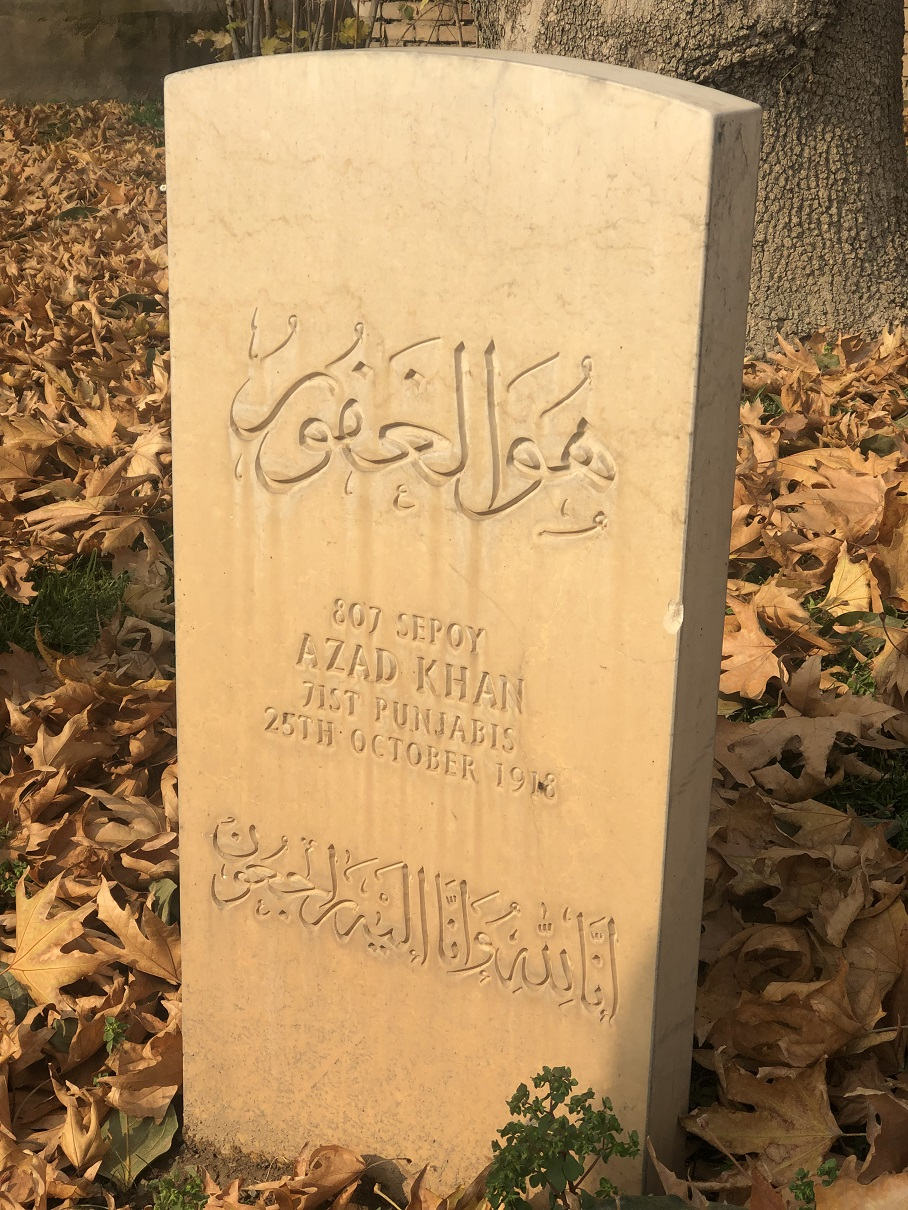
