= Gholhak Garden =

Iranian national heritage site

Coordinates: 35°46′41″N 51°26′17″E

Gholhak Garden (alternatively Qolhak Garden or Gulhak Garden; Persian: باغ قلهک) is a British overseas diplomatic compound in the northern Tehran neighborhood of Gholhak in Iran, about 3 miles (4.8 km) from the centre of Tehran. The sprawling tree-lined site, bordered by high walls, measures 200,000 square metres (49 acres) and houses British diplomats and their families. The compound is also home to the Tehran War Cemetery. The site has been at the centre of diplomatic controversy between Britain and Iran over ownership and management of the grounds.

== History ==
The Qajar monarchy gave the land for Gholhak Garden to the British in the 19th century at the height of their imperial power for their ambassador to use as a summer residence. At the time, Gholhak was a small village outside of Tehran.

Gholhak Garden is separate from the historic British embassy several miles south in central Tehran, where British ambassadors have now lived for decades. Today, several British diplomats and their families as well as some Iranian embassy staff reside in the Gholhak complex.

Built in 1962, the Tehran War Cemetery is also located on the site and is where over 500 British and Commonwealth soldiers who perished in the First and Second World wars are buried. The Gholhak grounds also contain the Tehran British Council and a school.

== Facilities ==
The École Française de Téhéran, the French school, is on the property of Gholhak Garden.

== Disputes and incidents ==
=== Ownership ===
The Islamic Republic of Iran, which has had strained relations with the United Kingdom, has on occasion demanded the return of the Gholhak property to Iran. In 2006, 162 Iranian MPs demanded an inquiry into the garden's status.

In 2007, government hardliners in Iran held a conference on Gholhak, arguing that British ownership was acquired illegally during the reign of Rezā Shāh in the 1930s. The conference secretary stated, "During the Reza Shah period the British embassy, without going through the proper legal processes, registered this area under its name. This is while they could have bought it. They can buy it now if they like. But first they should accept that the historical process was wrong and then they are free to buy." The same year, Iranian MPs tabled a bill calling on the Iranian government to force Britain to relinquish Gholhak and convert it into an anti-colonial museum.

Responding to these charges in 2007, the British embassy spokesman said that Iran had not officially challenged Britain's ownership of Gholhak and stated, "As far as we're concerned, there is no question about their ownership."

In July 2009, amid increased tensions between Iran and Britain following the disputed 2009 Iranian presidential elections, Iranian Brigadier General Mir-Faisal Baqerzade suggested that plans were underway to seize Gholhak Garden. Baqerzade previously declared, "If the British Government wants to keep Gholhak, then they should exchange it for Hyde Park."

In October 2011, Tehran's mayor Mohammad-Bagher Ghalibaf seized on the issue, instructing municipal lawyers to begin legal action to force Britain to forfeit its legal title to Gholhak. Observers suspected that the mayor may have been using the Gholhak dispute to boost his conservative credentials and profile prior to the 2013 Iranian presidential elections.

=== Protests ===
Gholhak Garden and the British embassy in central Tehran have been subject to periodic anti-Western demonstrations orchestrated by the Iranian government since the defunct American embassy has no longer been the central target after being taken over in 1979 during the Iran hostage crisis.

On December 29, 2008, Iranian students stormed Gholhak Garden in protest of Israel's bombardment of the Gaza Strip in the Gaza War. Some 300 students managed to occupy the compound for a short time and replaced the British flag with a Palestinian one.

On November 29, 2011, Iranian protesters stormed the British embassy in downtown Tehran and Gholhak Garden. The incident came amid rising tensions over Iran's nuclear program. Earlier in the month, Britain enacted new sanctions against Iran while the Iranian government retaliated by passing legislation to expel the British ambassador. The protesters broke into Gholhak and briefly seized six British embassy staff before being released by the Iranian police. Britain expressed outrage at the riots and warned of "serious consequences."

=== Environmental ===
In late October 2011, Iranian authorities accused the British of "environmental vandalism" for cutting down and burning over 300 trees in the Gholhak complex. Britain responded that it had only removed a "small number" of trees that died of "natural causes and become dangerously unstable", as the extension of the nearby Tehran Metro had disrupted the water supply.

In November 2011, the Tehran municipality announced that it had fined the British embassy US$1.23 million for the offence.

== See also ==
- Embassy of the United Kingdom, Tehran
- Tehran War Cemetery
