= Gholhak =

Neighborhood of Tehran, Iran

Coordinates: 35°47′N 51°30′E

Gholhak or Qolhak (Persian: قلهک) is a neighborhood located in District 3 of Tehran Municipality, Iran. It is bounded on the east by the Darrous neighborhood (Fakourian Street), on the west by the Gholhak River, on the north by the British Embassy Garden, and on the south by the Pourmeshkani Street and Zafar Street (Dastgerdi).

The area has had several aqueducts since ancient times, some of which are still in use. The water of the current aqueduct in the embassy, which is very large and still flowing, irrigates the old sycamore trees in the area. In Gholhak area, there are two mosques called Jame Mosque and Gholhak Aazam Mosque. Its oldest mosque is the Aazam Mosque of Gholhak, where palm trees are brought out for mourning during the days of Tasua and Ashura. Also, the bathroom of the people of Gholhak, located in Jalali Street, next to the Shariati dead end, which was known as old Hafez Bath until several years ago, is currently closed. This bath is nearly a hundred years old and its construction date is unknown. Evidence shows that the aqueduct's water, which flowed into the pool from the British embassy and was burned in the oven by the leaves of trees and timber, heated the water and bathed the residents. Has been.

== History ==
This neighborhood was thirteen kilometers south of Imamzadeh Saleh on the asphalt road. Its population during the Qajar period is estimated at one thousand people. This village is considered to be the first village of Shemiran and from there several rivers have branched around. One went to the foreign embassy, the other to the aristocratic palaces and court gardens of courtiers or employees. Manouchehr Sotoudeh in his book is limited and describes the characteristics of Gholhak as follows: Gholhak is located on both sides of the old road of Shemiran and is limited from the north to Tajrish and from the south to the lands of Chalharz and Davodieh and from the east to the lessons. And from the west to the hills of Elahieh and part of Zargandeh.

The first phone call from Shemiran to Tehran was made from Gholhak on the phone number of the house on the home telephone alley (currently Shahid Yazdanian).

== Etymology ==
Gholha means small peak; and the word is compounded from Ghol and the suffix kāf (-ak), which is a sign of change. Morteza Razfar on the name of Gholhak says: "It was said that after a while, it became Gholhak." There is evidence in Gholhak Hosseiniyah located in Gholhak Grand Mosque that confirms this; for example, Qalahak has been engraved on many buildings, columns, and other structures.

== Famous residents ==
Mohammad Beheshti and Morteza Motahhari were famous residents of Gholhak. Seyyed Alireza Beheshti, the son of Mohammad Beheshti, says: There were several shops on the street of our house. Laundry, butchers, fruit shops, bakeries, and oil shops were among the busiest and busiest shops in our neighborhood. The reason for naming Motahhari Street is that a very religious market person named Mr. Motahhari lived above our alley. The old name of Shahid Siddiq Street used to be called Turaj, and the name of this alley (Beheshti) was logical in older times, which I think was named after Colonel Manteghi, who once lived here. In the old days, most of the houses in this neighborhood were one-story or two-story, and most of the residents were middle-class and relatively up-and-coming people, most of whom were employees. The river was almost the same, except that it had a wooden bridge that connected the neighborhood, and it was so narrow that only one car could cross it. Ayatollah Beheshti's house was bought by Tehran Municipality, and was opened as a museum house later in July 2013.

Abbas Kiarostami, born in Gholhak neighborhood, also completed his high school education at Jam Gholhak School.

== Gholhak metro station ==
On 4 August 1965, the Children's Park and Library No. 7 in Gholhak was inaugurated by the Mayor of Tehran, Taghi Sarlak.

In the 1980s, due to the development of the Tehran Metro, Gholhak Children's Park and the library were completely destroyed and turned into a workshop for the construction of the metro station. Finally, in May 2009, Gholhak Metro Station was inaugurated by Mohammad Bagher Ghalibaf and Mohsen Hashemi Rafsanjani, the then Mayor and CEO of Tehran Metro.

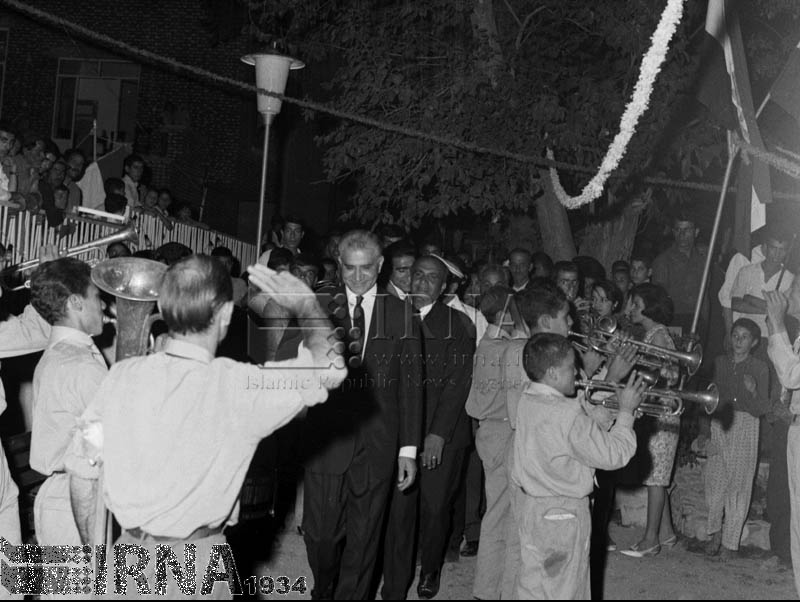
Opening of Gholhak Kindergarten, August 1965

== Historical events ==
Several meetings were held in the garden of the British Embassy, including a meeting of the Freemasons. During the first Pahlavi era (1925–41), although he was fired from his job due to a dispute between Reza Shah and Mohammad Ali Foroughi, groups of Freemasons came out of the British memorial in Gholhak Garden and Reza Shah was forced to return Foroughi.

Foroughi, who was himself the Grand Master of the Masonic Lodges in Iran, often met with representatives from the United States and Britain, including the British ambassador, at the Qolhak Garden Memorial, and tried to figure out the history of Iran. The reign of Mohammad Reza Pahlavi (1941–79) was one of the results of these meetings.

== Significant places ==
- Gholhak Metro Station
- Water Museum (Persian Gulf Park)
- Culture Cinema (Farhang Cinema)
- Negin-e Gholhak Shopping Center
- Negin-e Zafar Shopping Center
- Gholhak Shopping Center
- Gholhak Welfare Store
- Gholhak Campus
- Shahid Beheshti Museum
- Gholhak Grand Mosque
- Gholhak Garden

== See also ==
- Tehran War Cemetery
