= Shedd (surname) =

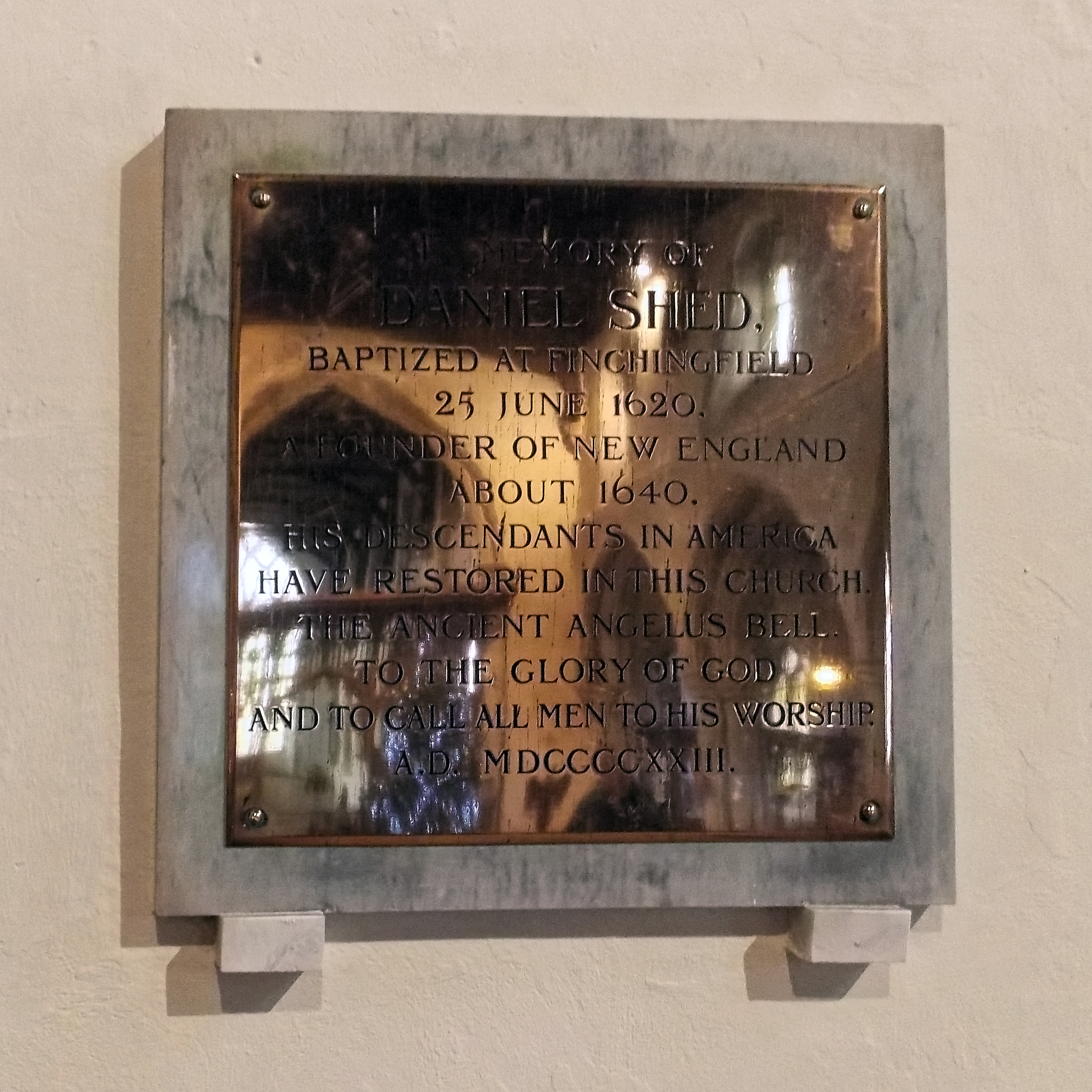
Daniel Shed memorial at Finchingfield

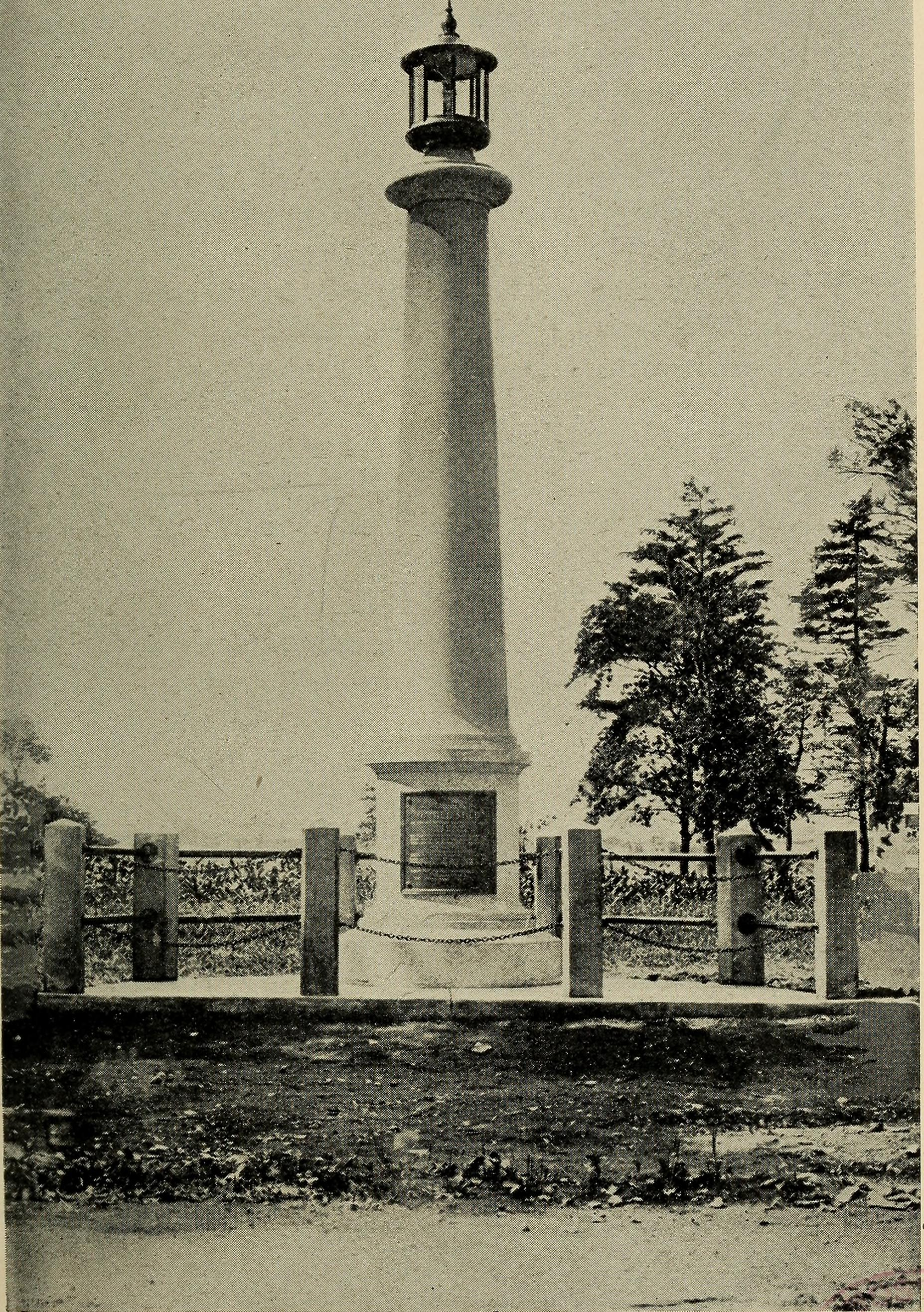
Memorial to Daniel Shed, Sheds Neck, Quincy, Massachusetts, in 1921

Shedd is a surname likely derived from 'de Schedde', the descendants of John de Schedde of Edwardstone, Suffolk, England.

In 1920 it was estimated that up to 70% of those with the Shedd name in the United States were descended from a Daniel Shed from Finchingfield, Essex, England.

Daniel Shed arrived in Braintree, Massachusetts about 1643 and homesteaded land in what is now Germantown in Quincy, Massachusetts. Until about 1750 Germantown was known as "Shed's Neck". After arrival in the Massachusetts Colony, Daniel Shed and his descendants changed the spelling of their surname. Daniel Shedd went on to be one of the founding settlers of Billerica, Massachusetts. His descendants include businessman and philanthropist John G. Shedd, and theologian William Greenough Thayer Shedd.

== People ==
- Ben Shedd, American film and video director, producer and writer
- David Shedd, American intelligence officer
- Dennis Shedd (born 1953), American judge
- George Clifford Shedd (1877–1937), American writer
- Harold Shedd (born 1931), American music industry executive and record producer
- Hibbard H. Shedd (1847–1905), American politician from Nebraska
- John G. Shedd (1850–1926), American businessman with Marshall Field & Company
- John Haskell Shedd (1833–1895), American Presbyterian missionary
- Kenny Shedd (born 1971), American football player
- Marjory Shedd (1926–2008), Canadian badminton player
- Milton Shedd (1922–2002), American businessman and philanthropist
- Randall Shedd (born 1953), American politician from Alabama
- Sarah Jane Dawes Shedd (1836–1921), American missionary teacher, wife of John Haskell Shedd
- Thomas Shedd, American official
- Virgia Brocks-Shedd (1943–1992), American librarian and poet
- William Greenough Thayer Shedd (1820–1894), American Presbyterian theologian
- William Ambrose Shedd (1865–1918), American Presbyterian missionary

== Sources ==
- Shedd, Frank; Gardner Bartlett, J. (1921), Ancestry and Descendants of Daniel Shed of Braintree, Massachusetts 1327-1920, Shedd Family Association
