= Ana Diamond =

Academic and human rights advocate

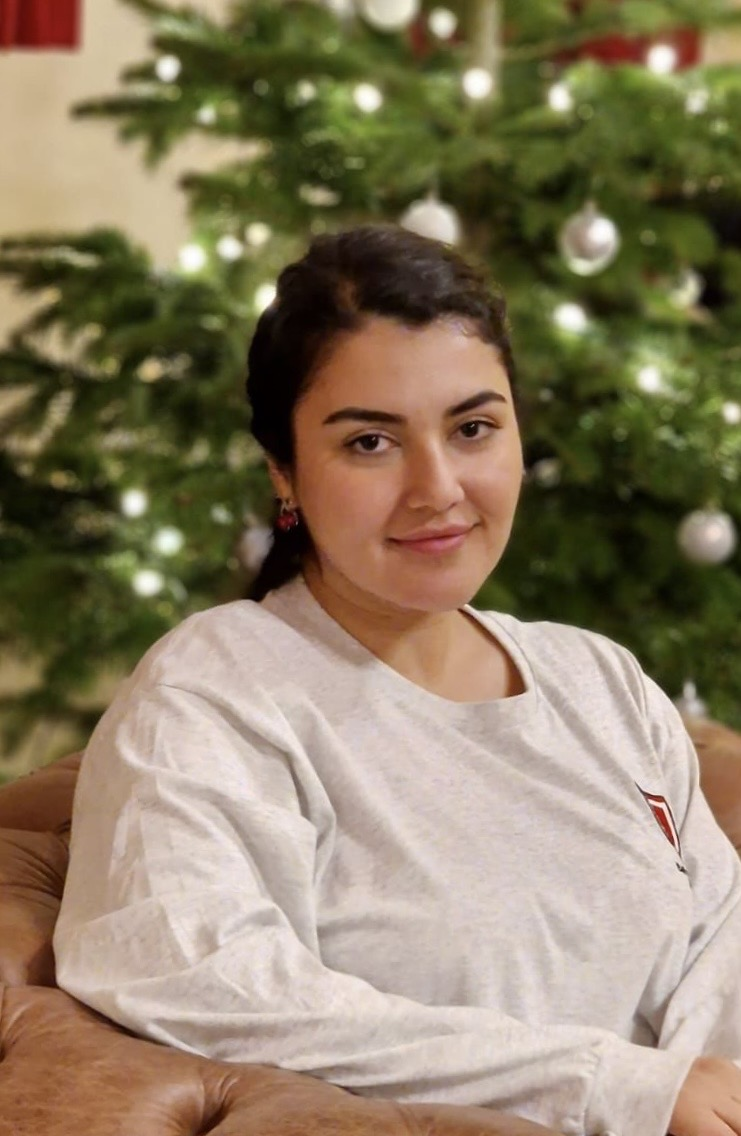
- Born: 1 August 1996 (age 30); Sir, Iran
- Other names: Anahita Diamond; A. D. Aaba Atach
- Education: Balliol College, Oxford; King's College London
- Occupations: Academic, author, human rights advocate
- Known for: Co-founder of Alliance Against State Hostage Taking, United Nations General Assembly in September 2019

Ana Diamond (Persian: آناهیتا دیامند; Armenian: Անահիտա Դայամոնդ, Kurdish: ئاناھیتا دیامەند; Azerbaijani: آناهیتا دیاموند Anāhitā Diyāmond) is a British-Iranian academic, author, and an advocacy strategist. She is one of the founding members of The Alliance Against State Hostage Taking, founded in New York on 24 September 2019.

Diamond rose to public eye following a fabricated lawsuit brought against her by the Islamic Republic of Iran in 2014, wrongly accusing her of espionage for the United Kingdom, United States, and a number of Western intelligence firms. She denied the allegations throughout. Her arrest, similar to the arrest of a number other dual-nationals, has been linked to the long-standing dispute of estimated £400m between Islamic Republic of Iran and United Kingdom. In recent years, Iran's behaviour and violation of human rights have been described as hostage diplomacy.

== Early life and education ==
Diamond was born in Sir, West Azerbaijan. She is of British descent and holds British nationality.

It is recorded that her paternal great-grandparents were Unitarian English missionary doctors who arrived in northwestern Iran in the early 19th century. They were among the earliest providers of organised Western medical care in the region and helped establish the medical facilities that later formed the foundation of Iran’s first modern Western medical school. Westminster College (now Urmia University) was formally inaugurated under Joseph Cochran of the American Presbyterian Mission in 1879, having built directly upon the medical work laid by the earlier British mission.

She comes from a family known for its political and religious leadership. Her immediate family left Iran after her father, a journalist, was arrested following the 1999 Iranian student protests. They subsequently lived in Turkey, Finland, and France before settling in the United Kingdom.

Diamond holds degrees from University of Oxford, King's College London, and University of California, Santa Barbara.

== Arrest and detention in Iran ==
Prior to travelling to Iran, Diamond joined the University of California Education Abroad Program and later worked on a short documentary project in the Old City in Jerusalem in 2014. These activities, along with her earlier involvement with the UK Young Conservatives, were cited by the Islamic Revolutionary Guards Corps as grounds for imposing a travel ban and detaining her upon her visit to Iran in 2014.

After two years under a travel ban, she was abducted from Gheytarieh near their house in Tehran and taken to Evin Prison in January 2016. Diamond spent eight months in solitary confinement in Evin Prison and was later briefly moved to the public ward, where she became close friends with Narges Mohammadi, Atena Farghadani, and Bahareh Hedayat, among others. During her time at Evin, she was the youngest female inmate, and among the very few dual nationals subjected to a mock execution and a virginity test. Diamond has described her treatment as "demeaning" and as "torture", and her case has been reported to the United Nations Working Group on Arbitrary Detention and United Nations Human Rights Council.

Her mistreatment was later raised with the United Nations’ Working Group on Arbitrary Detention and the United Nations Human Rights Council.

Due to her family's clerical background, Diamond was tried before the Special Clerical Court. Her lead prosecutor was Ebrahim Raisi, who later served as the eighth president of Iran from 2021 until his death in a helicopter crash in 2024.

== Release ==
In August 2016, Diamond was released on bail pending trial. She was placed under house arrest while her father was still imprisoned. In written evidence submitted to the UK Foreign Affairs Select Committee in April 2022, it was stated that the family's £5.5 million worth of property and assets were ultimately confiscated by the IRGC in Iran prior to their release and acquittal.

Although the charges against Diamond were eventually dropped and she was permitted to leave Iran in May 2018, following then–Foreign Secretary Boris Johnson’s first official visit to the country in late 2017, she believes she was only acquitted because the IRGC had already succeeded in extorting her family's assets in Iran, driven primarily by financial motives.

=== Health issues ===
Since her return to the UK, Diamond has been outspoken about the psychological trauma inflicted on her and the physical harm she has suffered during and since her detention, including arrhythmia.

She considers herself a torture survivor. When speaking with the i newspaper, she said:

The realisation that you might be taken and killed at any minute is very sobering, and in a way has been a pivotal factor in how I’ve been able to bounce forward [...] I have this renewed sense of ‘I need to make the most of my life’ because I almost lost it.

=== Scholarship to the University of Oxford ===
In 2021, Diamond was accepted to study at Balliol College, Oxford as a Clarendon scholar. She announced on X that she was a 2021 finalist for the Rhodes Scholarship under the highly competitive Global category.

In a feature on The Oxford Student, she was quoted describing her time at Oxford as, "Oxford helped me realise that even if you cannot achieve full justice, you can try to prevent injustice [...] We must make our existence in this world worthwhile, and what better place to start that journey than at university."

In an interview with Emma Barnett of the BBC Woman's Hour, Diamond spoke about her experience by quoting the French novelist André Malraux: "None of us walk through hell and come back-empty handed."

== Advocacy ==
In September 2019, Diamond became one of the founding members of The Alliance Against State Hostage Taking, alongside Richard Ratcliffe, Nazanin Zaghari-Ratcliffe's husband, Jason Rezaian, and Nizar Zakka. The Alliance was launched at the 74th United Nations General Assembly in New York City in 2019.

She has also worked with the United Nations, Freedom from Torture, Amnesty UK, and Hostage UK in understanding the trauma of returning hostages and their rights to demand enforceable reparation, including restitution, compensation, and rehabilitation.

Since the launch of the Alliance, Diamond has collaborated on a documentary with BBC Panorama to highlight that the arrest of dual and foreign nationals in Iran is often associated with the aim of extracting money, facilitating prisoner exchanges, lifting of sanctions, repayment of arms debts or other concessions.

In an interview with the Guardian, she has said that "The Iranian Revolutionary Guards Corps have been practising and perfecting their state hostage-taking for many decades now," and that she is advocating for a "legal path to hold Iran accountable for their atrocious violations of human rights and the deliberate and planned acts of kidnapping and torture of foreign nationals."

In July 2020, the UK government announced the launch of new 'Magnitsky'-style sanctions regime to target those who have perpetuated human rights violations and abuses around the world. The Alliance contributed to the passage of Magnitsky legislation in the UK, designed to provide sanctions against individuals who have committed human rights violations. The laws are named in honour of Sergei Magnitsky whose exposure of corruption and misconduct in Russia led to his arrest and death in police custody.

== Literary work ==
Diamond is a mentee of Terry Waite, an envoy for the Church of England and a former hostage negotiator. Waite was himself a hostage in Lebanon for five years, and helped Diamond to recover from her ordeal following her release.

She has stated that Waite played a significant role in her recovery and helped her regain her confidence. "The most important thing he taught me was that I should try to use this time of imprisonment creatively and look at it as something that strengthens my character," she has said of her mentor.

In 2024, Diamond was awarded the prestigious Alistair Horne Visiting Fellowship at St Antony's College, Oxford, to "write a significant book of non-fiction for a general readership". The same year, she won the Spread the Word Award for Early Career writers.

In March 2025, The Bookseller announced that she is writing a family memoir titled Breaking Silence for Canongate Books (UK) and Simon & Schuster (US and Canada), under the editorial guidance of Ellah Wakatama and Judy Clain, with publication scheduled for spring 2027.

== See also ==
- Iran–United Kingdom relations
- Hostage diplomacy
- List of foreign nationals detained in Iran
- Human rights in Iran
- List of women writers
- List of human rights activists
