= St. Sarkis Church (Sir, West Azerbaijan, Iran) =

Ancient Assyrian church near Urmia, Iran

- کلیسای مار سرکیس
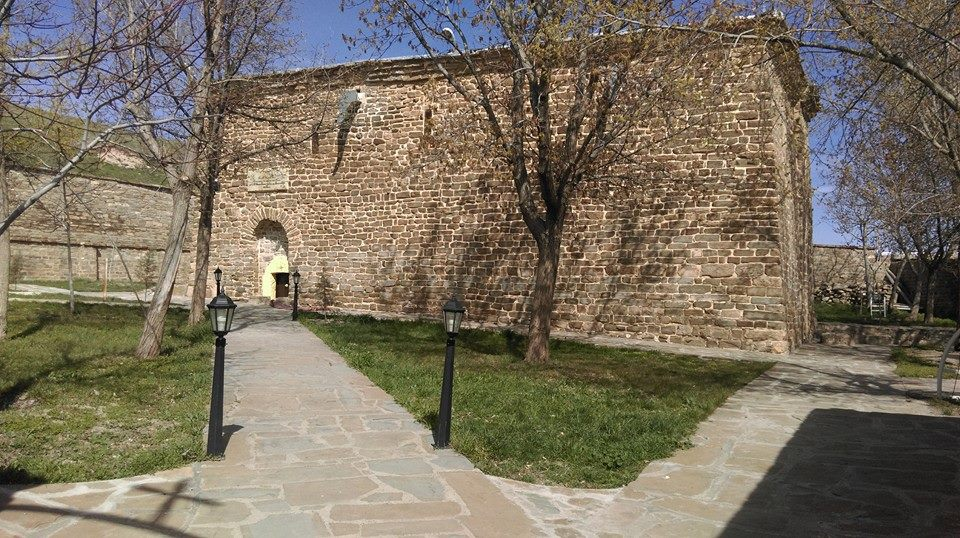
- St. Sarkis Church in Sir

- Location within Iran

Religion
- Affiliation: Assyrian Church of the East

Location
- Location: Sir, Urmia, West Azarbaijan Province, Iran
- Interactive map of St. Sarkis Church
- Coordinates: 37°28′11″N 45°02′01″E

Architecture
- Type: Church
- Groundbreaking: 5th century

St. Sarkis Church (Persian: کلیسای مار سرکیس; Imperial Aramaic: ܩܕܝܫܬܐ ܡܪܝ ܣܲܪܓܝܼܣ) is an ancient Assyrian church located in Sir close to Urmia, West Azerbaijan Province, Iran. Also known as the Maar-Sargiz Historical Church, Marserkis Church, Marsarkis Church, and Sir Church.

Current building of the church seems to have been built between the 3rd and 5th centuries. It is believed that St. Sarkis Church was built by the orders of Shirin (wife of the Sassanian emperor Khosrow Parviz), who was a Christian.

It is located on the slope of Mount Sir, 3 km southwest of the city of Urmia and is a pilgrim place of local Assyrian Christians. Its architecture relates to the Sasanian era. Its ceiling is in barrel vault and its thick walls are made out of irregular stones and sand-lime mortar. The altar lies on the east side and the church entrance on the southern wall. St. Sarkis Church consists of two parallel naves interconnected by a narrow passage. The southern nave is called Mar Sarkis (Saint Sergius) and the northern one Mar Bakus (Saint Bacchus). Both sides of the church style of arches are Sasanian and Tavizeh vault with a horseshoe-shaped cradle made.

The gravesite nearby is the burial place of Joseph Gallup Cochran and his son Joseph Plumb Cochran.

== Gallery ==
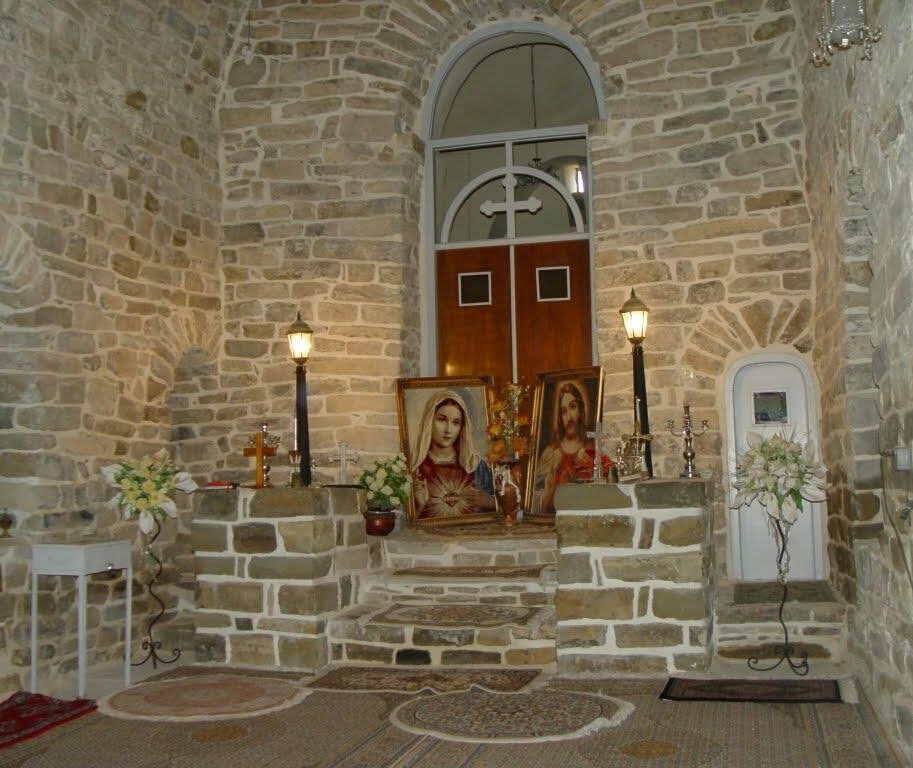
Interior of the church

== See also ==
- Iranian Assyrians
