= William Shedd =

William Shedd may refer to:

- William Greenough Thayer Shedd, American Presbyterian theologian
- William Ambrose Shedd, American Presbyterian missionary
