= Rachel Briggs =

British executive

Rachel Briggs OBE
- Education: Girton College, Cambridge
- Occupations: Non-Executive Director, Security analyst, Charity director

Rachel Briggs OBE was Founding Executive Director of Hostage US, the first Director of Hostage UK (now Hostage International) and was awarded an OBE in the 2014 Honours List for services to hostages and the families of victims kidnapped overseas. She is the Chair of the Board of Directors of the Global Center on Cooperative Security, an expert on foreign and security policy and an Associate Fellow of Chatham House.

== Work with hostages ==
While Briggs was studying in University her uncle was kidnapped by the ELN in Colombia and held for seven and a half months. It inspired her to write her undergraduate dissertation on international kidnapping in Colombia and she went on to author The Kidnapping Business while working at The Foreign Policy Centre think tank.

This report caught the attention of Terry Waite CBE and Carlo Laurenzi OBE, who were co-founding Hostage UK, the world's first support service for hostages and their families. Rachel joined the group and became the first Director in 2007 and served in that capacity for a decade. She relocated to Washington DC in 2015 to set up and run Hostage US, stepping down in 2020. She was appointed an OBE in 2014 in recognition of this work, and in 2017 she and Hostage US were profiled in The New York Times. In 2018, she was featured as one of the top 50 women driving change in the United States.

In addition, Briggs has contributed to our understanding of the kidnapping phenomenon, writing papers on the business of kidnapping, keeping people safe overseas and corporate security. Her co-authored report, The Business of Resilience, has become the blueprint for global security and risk management for many large multinationals. She regularly consults with corporations on their security risks.

== Risk and security analyst ==
In addition to her work with Hostages Briggs is a security analyst and policy academic specialising in security, counterterrorism and countering violent extremism.

Briggs began her career as a Researcher in 2001 at The Foreign Policy Centre where she initially focused on kidnapping, later launching the Risk and Security Programme working extensively with corporations on their own security as well as their contribution to public-private partnerships on counter-terrorism. While she was at the think tank Demos, she co-authored Bringing it Home, which lay the groundwork for community partnerships to tackle home-grown terrorism. She continued this work at the Royal United Services Institute (RUSI) and later became Research Director at the Institute for Strategic Dialogue where she pioneered new approaches to tackling online extremism and counter-narratives. Alongside a colleague from Google, she was Co-Chair of the European Commission's Working Group on Online Extremism.

She is currently an Associate Fellow at Chatham House and a regular commentator in the media on matters of foreign policy, national security, counter-terrorism and international hostage taking.

== Non-Executive Director ==
Briggs is Chair of the Board of Directors of the Global Center on Cooperative Security. She was previously a member of the Advisory Board of Wilton Park, the Risk and Security Management Forum (RSMF), and a member of the advisory board for the journal Renewal. Briggs served on two Boards of the FCO's Global Opportunity Fund.
