= Shedd =

Shedd may refer to:

== Institutions ==
- The Shedd Aquarium, in Chicago, Illinois.
- The John G. Shedd Institute for the Arts, in Eugene, Oregon.

== Places ==
- Shedd, Oregon

== See also ==
- Shedd (surname)
- Shed
- Sheed
