= Jacob David =

20th century Persian-born Assyrian pastor

- Born: 15 November 1873; Seyr (Sir), Persia
- Died: 26 May 1967 (aged 93); Chicago, United States
- Occupation(s): Pastor, relief worker

Jacob David (15 November 1873 – 26 May 1967) was a Persian-born Assyrian pastor and relief worker. He was born in Seyr (Sir), a village to the west of the city of Urmia, and died in Chicago.

== Sources ==
- Naby, Eden (2010). "DAVID, JACOB". Encyclopaedia Iranica.
