= Sir, West Azerbaijan =

Sir
- Village
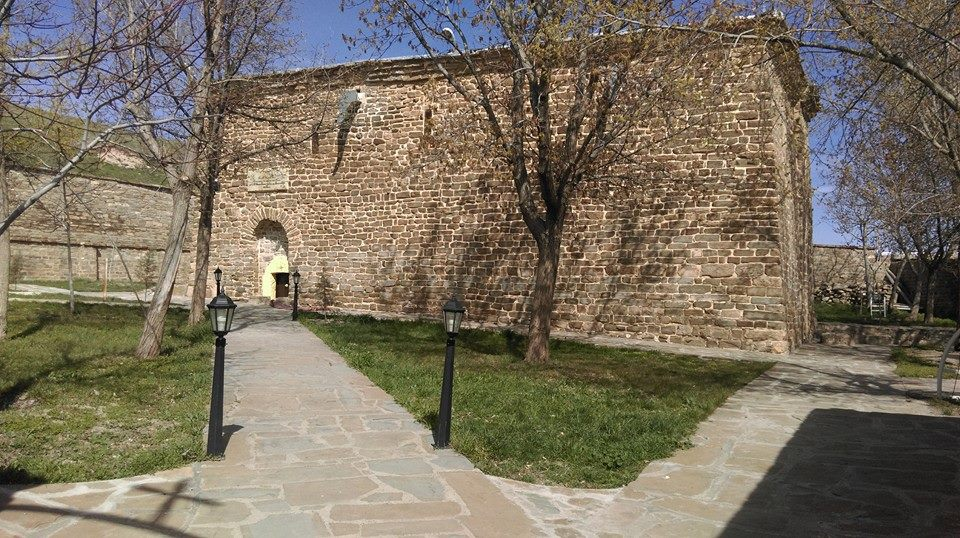
- Church of Mār Sargīs at Sīre

- Location within Iran
- Coordinates: 37°28′09″N 45°02′05″E
- Country: Iran
- Province: West Azerbaijan
- County: Urmia
- Bakhsh: Central
- Rural District: Baranduz

Population (2006)
  - Total: 134
- Time zone: UTC+3:30 (IRST)
  - Summer (DST): UTC+4:30 (IRDT)

Sir (Persian: سير, romanized: Sīr; Syriac: Sīre) (Note: Also known as Sari, Seer, Seir, and Seyr.) is a village in Baranduz Rural District, in the Central District of Urmia County, West Azerbaijan Province, Iran. At the 2006 census, its population was 134 people, in 32 families.

== History ==
The Church of Mār Sargīs at Sīre is attested in 1607. A male seminary, which had been established in January 1836 by the American missionary Justin Perkins at Urmia, was transferred in June 1847 to Sīre, where the missionaries had their summer retreat. The deacon Aṣlan, son of Mukhtas, of the Yōnān family of Gūgtāpāh copied a manuscript at Sīre in 1851 with the help of the priest Yōnān, son of Tamraz.

In 1862, Sīre with Haṣār Bezbagi was inhabited by 30 Church of the East Christian families and was served by 1 priest and the Church of Mār Sargīs, according to the Russian archimandrite Sophoniah. There were 27 Church of the East Christian families with 1 priest but no church at Sīre in 1877, as per Edward Lewes Cutts. The male seminary at Sīre was moved back to Urmia in 1879.

A considerable number of manuscripts were copied at Sīre in the decades prior to the First World War. The scribe Shemʿōn, son of the deacon Yōḥannān, of Mār Behīshōʿ copied a manuscript at the Anglican school at Sīre in 1893. The scribe Thomas Qellaitā of Mār Behīshōʿ copied a manuscript at Sīre in 1896. The American missionary Joseph Cochran (d. 1905) was buried at the Assyrian Missionary Cemetery at Sīre.

Basil Nikitin, the Russian consul at Urmia, recorded that the village was populated by Christians and Muslims just before the First World War. It was located in the Baranduz district. Prior to the First World War, there were 60 Assyrian houses at Sīre, as per the list presented by Agha Petros to the Lausanne Peace Conference in 1922.

== Notable people ==
- Joseph Gallup Cochran (1817–1871), missionary
- Jacob David (1873–1967), pastor and relief worker
- William Ambrose Shedd (1865–1918), missionary
- Ana Diamond (b. 1996), British-Iranian scholar and author

== Bibliography ==
- Afshar, Ahmadreza (2017). "The Westminster Medical College and Hospital in Urmia, Iran, 1879-1915". Archives of Iranian Medicine. 20 (12): 760–766. PMID 29664317.
- Becker, Adam H. (2015). Revival and Awakening: American Evangelical Missionaries in Iran and the Origins of Assyrian Nationalism. University of Chicago Press.
- Gaunt, David (2006). Massacres, Resistance, Protectors: Muslim-Christian Relations in Eastern Anatolia during World War I. Gorgias Press.
- Hellot-Bellier, Florence (2017). "The Resistance of Urmia Assyrians to Violence at the Beginning of the Twentieth Century". In David Gaunt; Naures Atto; Soner O. Barthoma (eds.). Let Them Not Return: Sayfo – The Genocide against the Assyrian, Syriac and Chaldean Christians in the Ottoman Empire (PDF). pp. 70–99.
- Naby, Eden (2010). "DAVID, JACOB". In Yarshater, Ehsan (ed.). Encyclopædia Iranica (Online ed.). Encyclopædia Iranica Foundation.
- Wilmshurst, David (2000). The Ecclesiastical Organisation of the Church of the East, 1318–1913 (PDF). Peeters Publishers.
