= Richard Barrett (counter-terrorism expert) =

British diplomat and intelligence officer (born 1949)

Richard Martin Donne Barrett CMG OBE (born 14 June 1949) is a former British diplomat and intelligence officer now involved in countering violent extremism. Barrett is a recognised global expert on terrorism who frequently appears as a panellist in related conferences and whose commentary is regularly featured in the press.

== Biography ==
Barrett was born in Taplow and was educated at Ampleforth College in Yorkshire. In 1973, he was awarded a Master of Arts in Modern History and Italian Literature from University College, Oxford.

From March 2004 to January 2013 Barrett led the Monitoring Team that supports the United Nations Security Council Committee pursuant to resolution 1267 (1999) concerning Al-Qaida and associated individuals and entities. Mr. Barrett was also a founding member of the United Nations Counter-Terrorism Implementation Task Force (CTITF), which was established in 2005 to promote the UN Global Counter-Terrorism Strategy adopted by the General Assembly in 2006. He chaired the CTITF Working Group on Terrorist use of the Internet and the CTITF Working Group on Dialogue Understanding and Countering the Appeal of Terrorism.

Barrett has been designated as one of the Global Experts of the Alliance of Civilizations, a group of recognised expert commentators available to the media to provide objective analysis on a range of pressing international issues. He has spoken frequently on television and radio, and his interviews have been featured on Amanpour (CNN) and Charlie Rose (PBS). He is the author of several articles and commentaries including op-eds for The Guardian, The New York Times, The Financial Times and The International Herald Tribune.

Before being appointed to lead the Monitoring Team, Barrett spent his career in government service to the United Kingdom. He has held positions in the British Security Service (MI5) and the Foreign and Commonwealth Office. Barrett also served as director of Global Counter Terrorism Operations for the British Secret Intelligence Service (SIS) both before and after the 11 September 2001 attacks on the United States.

He has served abroad in Canada, Jordan, Turkey and the United States.

Barrett sits on the boards of the International Centre for Counter-Terrorism in The Hague; the Transnational Crisis Project; the Global Center on Cooperative Security; The Centre for Research and Security Studies in Islamabad, The Qatar International Academy for Security Studies in Doha and The Center for the Study of United Nations Systems and the Global Legal Order (SUNSGLOW).

Barrett was appointed Officer of the Order of the British Empire (OBE) in 1992 and Companion of the Order of St Michael and St George (CMG) in the 2013 Birthday Honours.

Barrett was author (see below) of at least one ICSR report.

=== Career as opinionist ===
- In October 2009, Barrett wrote that the terrorist organisation-du-jour "is 'losing credibility' among its potential supporters", Barrett also remarked that it hadn't "really made a connection to a new generation" of young Muslims who have little recollection of the events of 9/11 and are less interested in religion. In the case of the attempted assassination on 27 August 2009 of Prince Mohammed Bin Nayef, at the time the Saudi terrorist rehabilitation programme, the Daily Telegraph summarised that:

This time the would-be assassin, the ostensibly repentant Asiri, gave himself up and took two flights, one aboard the Prince's private jet, and spent 30 hours closely guarded by the Prince's personal security detail. It was during the month of Ramadan, a time of repentance for Muslims and Aseiri (sic) was granted an audience with the prince at his private palace in Jeddah, by declaring that he would persuade other militants to surrender. Asiri briefly called other militants to tell them that he was standing alongside Prince Nayef. It was all recorded by al-Qaeda who has turned the episode into an animated movie boasting of their exploits.

- On 6 September 2014, Barrett wrote that one useful addition to the CONTEST (or Prevent) strategy would be to use "repentant fighters" or "disillusioned militants" to "come home" and publicise the brutality of ISIS.
- He returned to the theme of terrorist repatriation scant hours after the Bataclan massacre occurred in Paris on 13 November 2015, writing:

But thankfully the brutal reality of Isil membership – its squalor, inadequacy and ultimate failure – is also increasingly becoming apparent... [Repentant terrorists] will help us cut the flow of fighters to Syria by helping us understand why they go, why they stay and why they come back. It is these same people who can be more powerful influences than any other on those who may be inclined to join or act on behalf of Isil. Often they have tried it and seen it does not work. They have the credibility and understanding that the rest of us lack. They hold the key to victory.

- On 26 November 2014, scant hours after the Rifkind report into the murder of Lee Rigby was released to the public, he appeared to excuse tech firms like Facebook, which had been shown to broadcast the terrorist threats of Adebolawe that led directly to his savage actions.
- Barrett wrote an op-ed in The Guardian two days after the 2017 London Bridge attack
- Two days after the 2016 Nice truck attack, Barrett wrote an article about how "The best defence..." against terrorism is to freeze state anti-terror policy, the security services had still not much clue about who becomes a terrorist and why they become a terrorist, and that Muslim community loyalty to the state seems dependent on success:

Without [muslim] community help, the job of intelligence services is clearly far harder; but [muslim] communities will only help if they believe that their broader interests are also served by helping the state. When this is more obviously the case, terrorism will not only become more rare – it will also become less effective.

- Barrett wrote one day after the Manchester Arena bombing of May 2017 that "We have the world's best security services – but the Manchester attack was inevitable" and that "These attacks highlight our vulnerability to the indiscriminate acts of people who see no better way to express their disaffection than by murdering their fellow citizens." Barrett found the ISIS explanation a "perfectly ridiculous description".

== Selected publications ==
- Richard Barrett: The Islamic State November 2014.
- Richard Barrett: Foreign Fighters in Syria () June 2014.
- Richard Barrett. "Seven Years After 9/11, The International Centre for the Study of Radicalisation and Political Violence (September 2008).
- Richard Barrett and Laila Bokhari. "De-radicalisation and rehabilitation programmes targeting militant jihadists: An overview." Chapter 10 in Leaving Terrorism Behind, Jorgo and Horgan, eds. (Routledge, 2008).
- Hamed El-Said and Richard Barrett. "Radicalisation and Extremism that Lead to Violent Extremism in the Arab World" in Part III of Globalisation, Democratisation and Radicalisation in the Arab World, El-Said and Harrington, eds. (Palgrave Macmillan, 2010).
- Richard Barrett. "Al-Qaeda and Taliban Sanctions Threatened," Policy Watch 1409 for the Washington Center for Near East Policy (6 October 2008).
- Richard Barrett, et al. "The Al-Qaeda-Taliban Nexus." Expert Roundup, Council on Foreign Relations (25 November 2009).
- Richard Barrett. "The broader impact of terrorism on financial stability." Seminar on Current Developments in Monetary and Financial Law Washington, D.C., International Monetary Fund (26 October 2006).
- Richard Barrett. "The Role of the United Nations in Defeating Al-Qa'ida and Associated Groups," CTC Sentinel 2, no. 4 (April 2009).
