= Hostage US =

Nonprofit organization for American hostages

Hostage US is a nonprofit organization that was established in 2016 that offers support to American hostages and their families during and after a hostage crisis. The organization offers financial aid, legal advice, and counseling and peer support networks. Hostage US works with government agencies, other nonprofits, and the private sector.

Rachel Briggs relocated to Washington, DC, in 2015 to set up and run Hostage US. She later steps down in 2020 as the founding executive director. In 2017, Briggs and Hostage US were profiled in The New York Times. The executive director of the organization is Liz Cathcart.
