= Rahim Hobbenaghi =

Professor

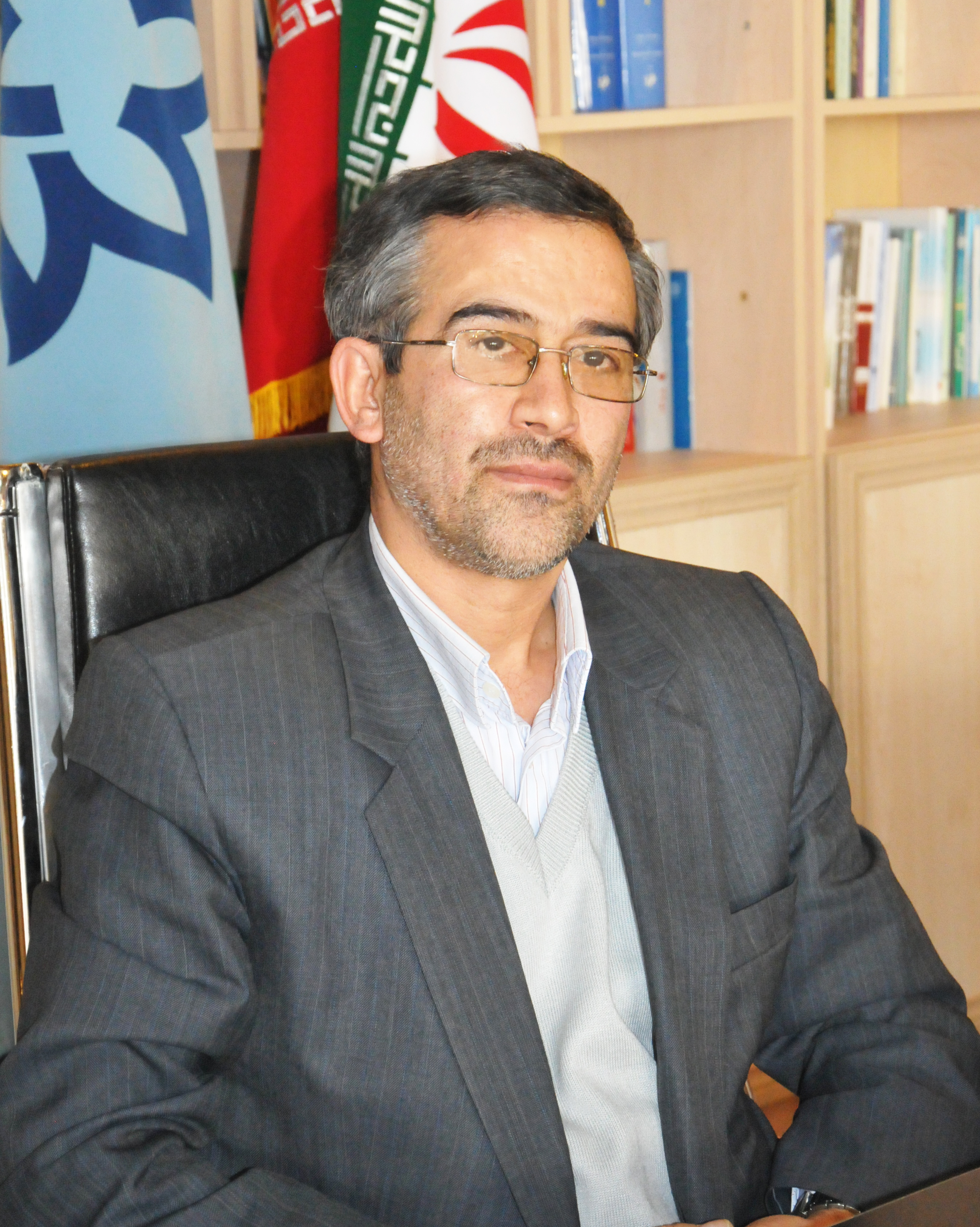
Dr. Rahim Hobbenaghi

Rahim Hobbenaghi (born in January 1960, Urmia) is an Iranian professor, veterinarian, and university president. He has been the President of Urmia University from 1997 to 2001, and again from 2014 to 2021.

== Early life ==
Hobbenaghi was born in January 1960 in Urmia, located in Iran's West Azerbaijan Province, Iran.He completed his education in Urmia through high school. In 1979, he was accepted into a veterinary program at the University of Tehran. Hobbenaghi is also a veteran of the Iran–Iraq War and participated in the Before the Dawn, Dawn 1, and Dawn 2 operations.

According to the site of Iranian higher education (Ministry of Science) on January 1, 2018, Dr. Hobbenaghi was selected for a second consecutive term and will be the university's president for the next four years starting from February 2018. He is the first to serve three non-consecutive terms.

Academic offices
Preceded by Mehdi Razavi Rouhani	President of Urmia University; 1997–2001	Succeeded by Goudarz Sadeghi-Hashjin
Preceded by Hassan Sedghi	President of Urmia University; 2014–2021	Succeeded by Ahmad Alijanpour
