= Hassan Sedghi =

Hassan Sedghi-Gamechi is a professor of physics in Urmia University, in city of Urmia in West Azerbaijan Province, Iran. He was appointed as president of Urmia University from 2006 and he served in this position till January 2014 when he replaced by Rahim Hobbenaghi.

== Education ==
He received a bachelor's degree from Tarbiat Modares University, a Master of Science from University of Tehran in 1980, and a PhD from University of New South Wales in 1994. All of his education was in Physics.

Academic offices
Preceded by Goudarz Sadeghi-Hashjin	President of Urmia University; 2006–2014	Succeeded by Rahim Hobbenaghi
