= Alliance Against State Hostage Taking =

Human rights organization

The Alliance Against State Hostage Taking was a collective initiative founded by a group of former hostages and families of those detained in Iran who campaigned against the practice of Iran's hostage diplomacy. In the aftermath of the Joint Comprehensive Plan of Action (JCPOA), the Islamic Republic of Iran employed a fresh trend of the tactic of arresting Western citizens and dual-nationals in a bid to extract concessions from its foes, in a strategy of hostage diplomacy that has long presented the Western world with a dilemma.

The movement, which was known as the Families Alliance Against State-Hostage Taking argued that Iran was systematically arresting dual nationals, often with Western ties, on false, unfounded charges like espionage or "collaborating with hostile states", and using their imprisonment as leverage to extract political and economic concessions from Western governments.

It formally launched at the United Nations General Assembly in New York on 24 September 2019.

The Alliance Against State Hostage Taking established a powerful social movement, serving as the foundational inspiration for several subsequent human rights groups and charitable organizations. Among its most notable offspring are Hostage International, Hostage Aid Worldwide and Hostages Alliance. All of these groups are dedicated to advancing the movement's mission of eliminating the use of arbitrary detention of foreign individuals to exert pressure on governments, extract concessions, or influence negotiations—particularly in relation to political disputes and geopolitical disagreements.

These organisations have been actively involved in addressing the ongoing cases of the kidnapped US journalist Austin Tice, and the British couple Craig and Lindsay Foreman who were arrested in Tehran in January 2025 on charges of espionage as well as in advocacy efforts following the kidnapping of 240 Israeli citizens by Hamas militants during the 7 October 2023 attacks.
