= Goudarz Sadeghi-Hashjin =

Goudarz Sadeghi-Hashjin (born July 1, 1963) was the President of University of Mohaghegh Ardabili between 2014 and 2018. He also previously served as president of Urmia University from 2001 till 2005.

== Early life ==
He born on in Hashjin, Khalkhal in north west of Iran. He did his studies in Ardabil up to high school. In 1989 he was graduated with a doctorate in Veterinary medicine from Urmia University. He pursued his education in Pharmacology in Utrecht University in Utrecht, Netherlands where he defended his PhD in 1996. Then, he was employed in Urmia University as an assistant professor.

Academic offices
Preceded by Rahim Hobbenaghi	President of Urmia University; 2001–2005	Succeeded by Hassan Sedghi
Preceded by Masod Ganji	President of University of Mohaghegh Ardabili; 2014–2018	Succeeded by Aziz Habibi-Yangjeh
