= John Haskell Shedd =

Presbyterian Missionary

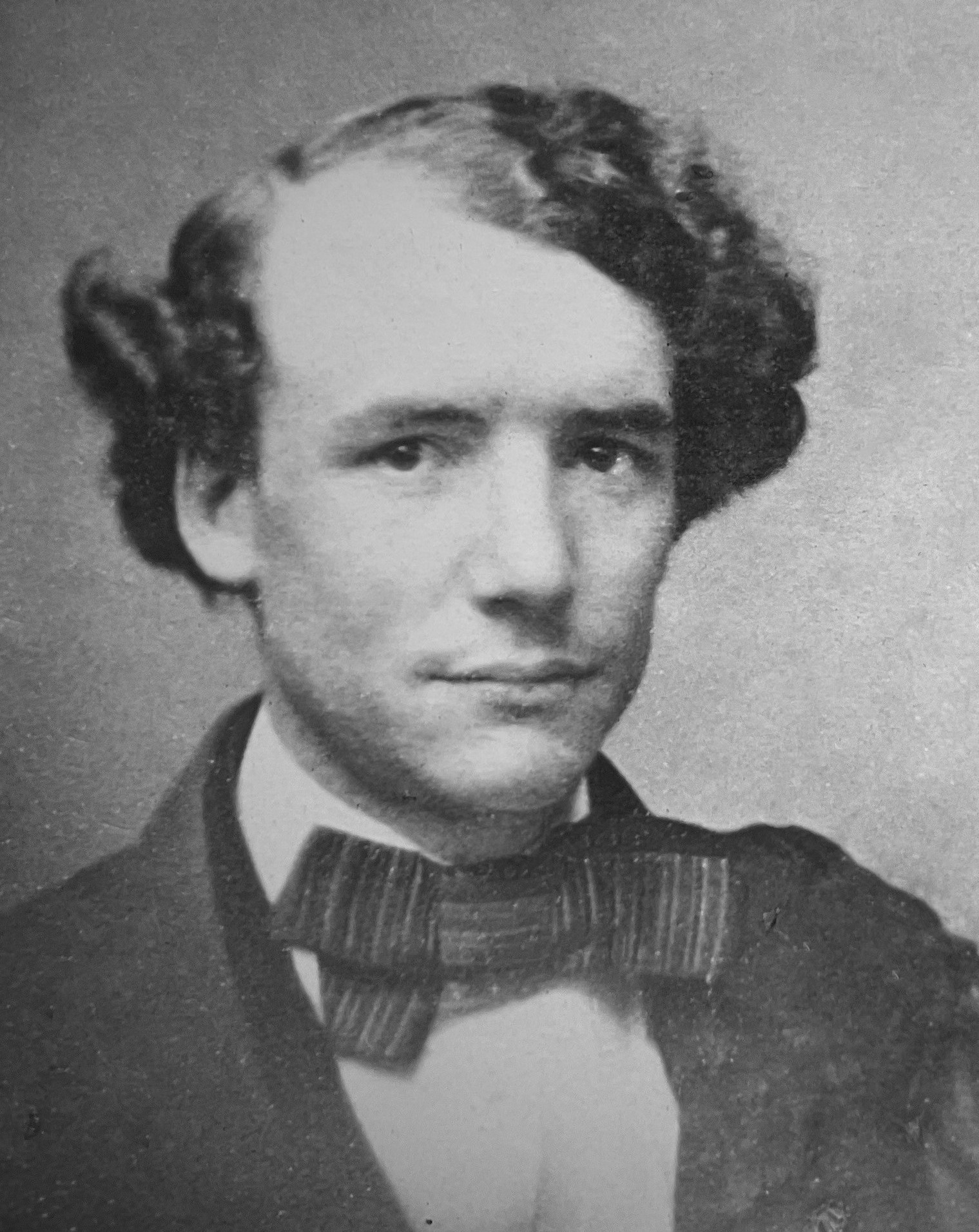
- Portrait of John Haskell Shedd before his deployment as an ABCFM missionary to Persia
- Born: July 9, 1833; Mt. Gilead, Ohio
- Died: April 12, 1895 (aged 61); Urmia
- Education: Marietta College, Lane Theological Seminary, Andover Theological Seminary
- Occupation: Missionary

John Haskell Shedd (1833–1895) was an American Presbyterian missionary who served in Persia during the nineteenth century.

He was born on July 9, 1833 in Mt. Gilead, Ohio. After attending Marietta College, Lane Theological Seminary, and Andover Theological Seminary, he was assigned as a missionary of the American Board of Commissioners for Foreign Missions (ABCFM) to the city of Urmia in Northwestern Persia in 1859. He and his wife, teacher Sarah Jane Dawes Shedd sailed for Persia in the same year.

Shedd was instrumental to the growth of the Urmia mission station, which housed Persia's first modern medical college located on what eventually became the main campus of Urmia University in the century that followed. During his missionary career, Shedd meticulously recorded his experiences and interactions with the local populations in the Turco-Persian border region. These writings became the basis for a biography of his life, authored by his son, William Ambrose Shedd, and titled The Life of John Haskell Shedd. He was also instrumental to the formation of the Assyrian Evangelical Church. John Haskell Shedd died in 1895 and was laid to rest in the American Cemetery in the village of Seir, where his gravestone still stands.
