= Sarah Jane Dawes Shedd =

American missionary teacher (1836–1921)

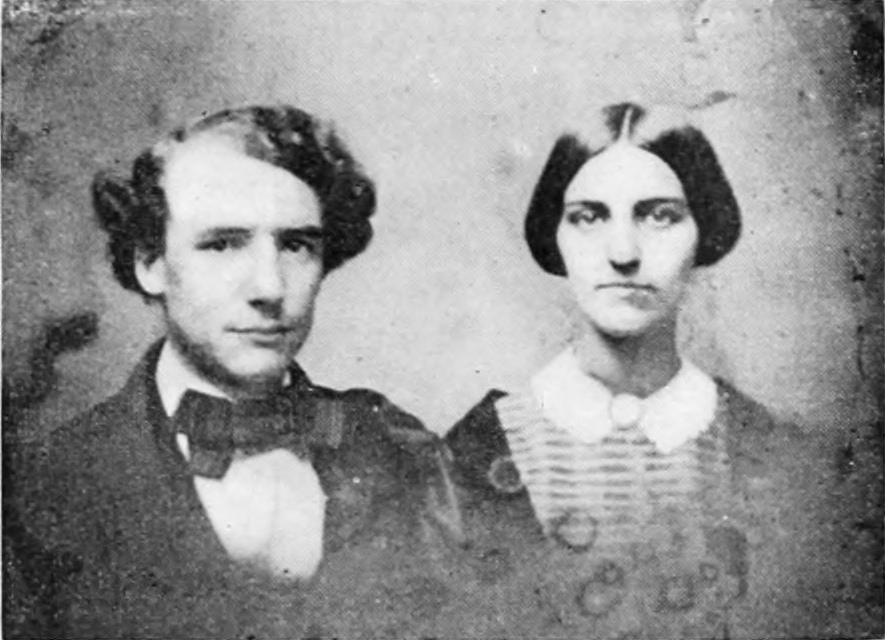
John H. Shedd and Sarah J. Shedd early in their marriage, before their 1859 deployment to Persia

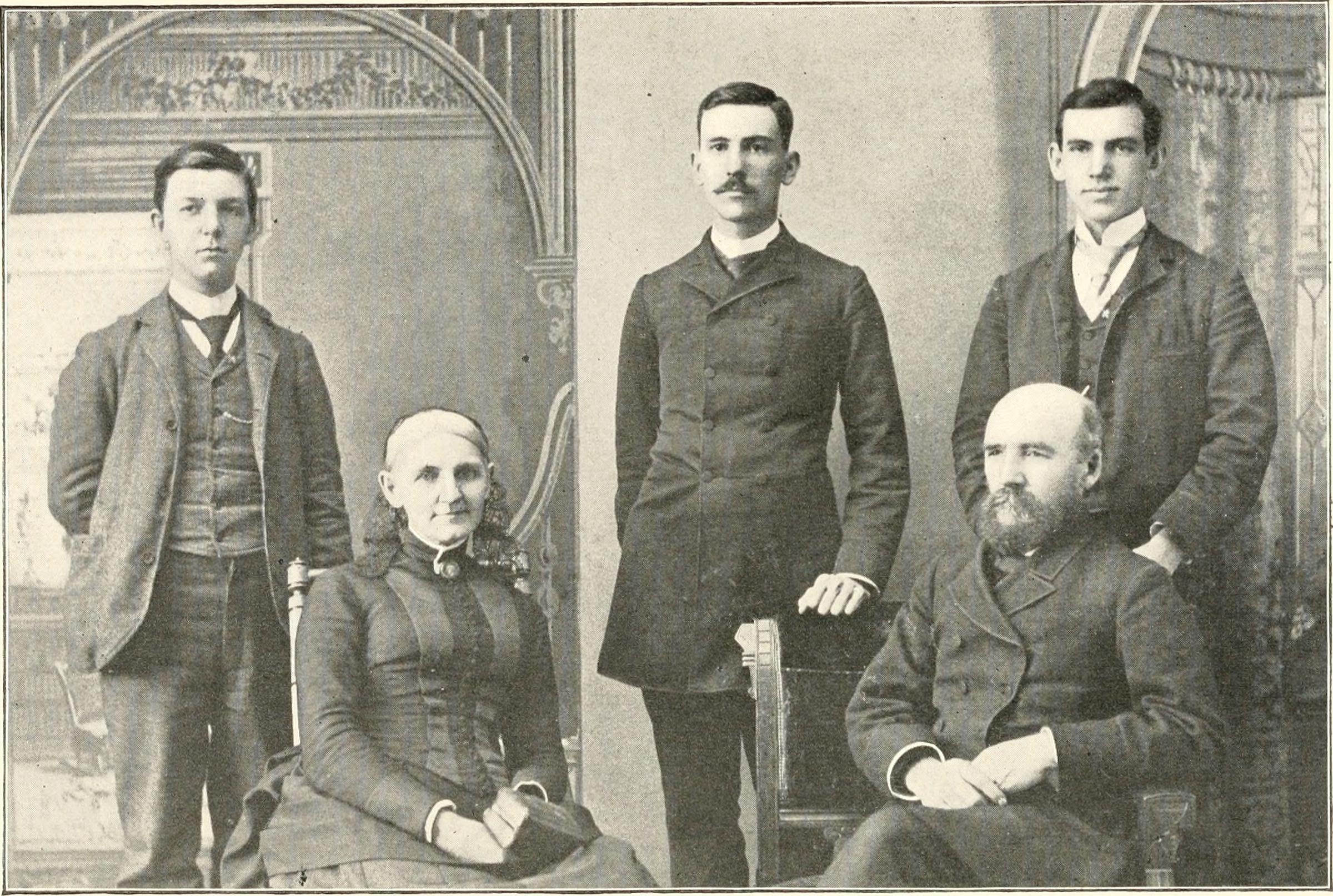
Sarah Jane Dawes Shedd (seated in front, left) with her husband (seated in front, right) and three of their sons, Ephraim, William, and John, from a 1900 publication

Sarah Jane Dawes Shedd (January 9, 1836 – 1921) was an American missionary teacher, serving Assyrian Christians at Urmia in Persia.

== Early life ==
Sarah Jane "Jennie" Dawes was born in Malta, Ohio, the daughter of Henry Dawes and Sarah Cutler Dawes. She attended Western Female Seminary in Oxford, Ohio, graduating in the class of 1858. Her brother Rufus Dawes was a Congressman. Another brother, Ephraim C. Dawes, was a prominent historian of the American Civil War. Her nephews included Nobel Peace Prize recipient Charles G. Dawes, Congressman Beman Gates Dawes, and banker Henry M. Dawes. Among her maternal kin were Ephraim Cutler, William P. Cutler, and Rev. Manasseh Cutler.

== Mission work ==
Dawes married the Rev. John Haskell Shedd (1833–1895) in 1859. They sailed for Persia soon after, as missionaries with the American Board of Commissioners for Foreign Missions (ABCFM). They served Assyrian Christians of the Nestorian mission at Urmia, which is in northwestern Iran. The Shedds took a furlough in the United States in 1870. While in America for several years, they worked among freedmen in Charlotte, North Carolina. They returned to Persia in 1878. Shedd wrote letters about her experiences in Persia, with the caveat, "I can not write much. My cares are very great, as I have the family stories, and the mission here, who need things; all must come to me." She wrote an article about Urmia, many years later, for a women's missionary magazine.

The Shedds had at least eight children, including four who died in infancy or childhood. Their son William Ambrose Shedd (1865–1918) followed them into Presbyterian mission work in Persia. Sarah survived her husband and son, moved to Colorado Springs, Colorado to live in widowhood, and died in 1921, aged 85 years. Her gravesite is with those of her extended family, in Ohio.
