= Hostage International =

International charity

Hostage International, formerly Hostage UK, is a charity which aims to support the families of hostages and former hostages by providing emotional and practical care both during and after kidnap. Hostage International primarily assists individuals affected by a kidnap or illegal detention outside their home country.

== Origins ==
Hostage International was the brainchild of Sir Terry Waite, who was held hostage by the Islamic Jihad Organisation, and Carlo Laurenzi, head of the NGO Prisoners Abroad. Waite was kidnapped in Lebanon and held for five years. While working for Prisoners Abroad, Laurenzi became aware of the lack of provision for families of detainees and the absence of help for returnees. In 2003, the two met for the first time and agreed to establish a new organization to support families of kidnap victims. After putting together a shadow board of trustees and supporters, Hostage UK was officially launched in the Palace of Westminster in 2004. In 2014 Hostage UK's work was recognised by the UK government when the then director Rachel Briggs was appointed an OBE in recognition of the charity's work.

== High profile cases ==
In operation since 2004, Hostage International has dealt with some high-profile cases including those of David Haines and Peter Moore. David Haines’ family asked well-wishers to donate to the charity instead of sending flowers.

Many former hostages and family members of hostages work with the charity. These include Phil Bigley, the brother of murdered former hostage Kenneth Bigley, former hostages Judith Tebbutt, Peter Rudge and Ana Diamond.
