= Global Center on Cooperative Security =

International non-profit organization

- Global Center on Cooperative Security
- Abbreviation: Global Center
- Formation: 2004
- Type: International non-profit peace and security organization
- Location: New York, Washington, D.C., London, Brussels, Nairobi
- Executive Director: Eelco Kessels
- Website: http://www.globalcenter.org

The Global Center on Cooperative Security is an independent, nonpartisan, not-for-profit research and policy institute based in New York, Washington D.C., London, Brussels, and Nairobi. The Global Center works to improve multilateral security cooperation through policy research and issue-area projects throughout the world.

== History ==
The Global Center on Cooperative Security (Global Center) was born out of a recognition that addressing violent extremism requires innovative approaches that are equitable, non-violent, and shaped by those who are most affected by conflict and injustice. The Global Center was originally founded in 2004 by Alistair Millar as a project of the Fourth Freedom Forum, and has since established itself as a standalone organization.

== Staff ==
Currently, Eelco Kessels serves as the Executive Director of the Global Center.

The Global Center's staff include a number of scholars and practitioners with expertise in multilateral security policy. Richard Barrett, a Senior Fellow for the Global Center (UK), is the Director of The Global Strategy Network, a former British diplomat and intelligence officer who led the UN monitoring team concerning al-Qaida and the Taliban, and Director of Global Counter Terrorism Operations in the United Kingdom. Peter Romaniuk, a Senior Non-resident Fellow at the Global Center, is an Associate Professor of Political Science at the John Jay College of Criminal Justice.

== Programming ==
The Global Center focuses on four thematic areas of programming and engagement: multilateral security policy; countering violent extremism; criminal justice and the rule of law; financial integrity and inclusion. Across these areas, the Global Center prioritizes partnerships with national and regional stakeholders and works to ensure respect for human rights and empower those affected by transnational violence and criminality to inform international action.

The Global Center's multilateral security policy efforts focus on building stronger partnerships among intergovernmental organizations, civil society, and national institutions to address transnational threats and underlying sources of insecurity through collaborative, multidisciplinary research and policy analysis and implementation. Through its countering violent extremism platform, the Global Center works with local, regional, and international partners to promote holistic, preventative responses to violent extremism that underscore the critical importance of human rights, the rule of law, and community engagement. The Global Center’s criminal justice programming works to strengthen the capacity of justice and security providers—and those who hold them accountable—to provide for community security, human rights, and the rule of law. Through its programming on financial integrity and inclusion, the Global Center develops and delivers capacity development support, conducts innovative research, and provides independent policy advice to advance interlinked development, security, and financial integrity and transparency aims.

== Advisory Council ==
The Global Center's Advisory Council includes a number of international experts, academics, and policy practitioners. Its members include:

- Richard Barrett CMG OBE, Director of The Global Strategy Network
- Ambassador Daniel Benjamin, president of the American Academy in Berlin
- Betty Bigombe, Ugandan peacebuilder and Senior Advisor to the South Sudan Peace Process
- Judge David O. Carter, U.S. District Court Judge for the Central District of California
- Sarah Cliffe, Director of New York University’s Center on International Cooperation
- Dr. Iftekhar Ahmed Chowdhury, Principal Research Fellow at the Institute of South Asian Studies, National University of Singapore and former Foreign Minister of Bangladesh
- Dr. Carolina Hernandez, Professor Emeritus of Political Science at the University of the Philippines
- Dr. Chantal de Jonge Oudraat, Member of the Board and former President of Women in International Security
- Steve Killelea, philanthropist and founder of the Institute for Economics and Peace
- Mary McCord, Legal Director at the Institute for Constitutional Advocacy and Protection and Visiting Professor of Law at Georgetown University Law Center
- Marcus Peffers, founder and CEO of M&C Saatchi World Services
- Dr. Fernando Reinares, Director of the Program on Global Terrorism at the Elcano Royal Institute for International and Strategic Studies
- Ambassador Mike Smith, former Executive Director of the UN Counter-Terrorism Committee Executive Directorate
- Ambassador Farooq Sobhan, former Bangladeshi diplomat and former President and Chief Executive of the Bangladesh Enterprise Institute

== Donors and funding ==
The Global Center receives financial support from a number of public and private donors, including national governments. 97% of the Global Center’s donors have reinvested in its work.

== Related publications ==
- Melissa Lefas, Junko Nozawa and Eelco Kessels, "BLUE SKY V: An Independent Analysis of UN Counterterrorism Efforts," The Global Center on Cooperative Security (November 2020).
- Eleonore Pauwels, "Artificial Intelligence and Data Capture Technologies in Violence and Conflict Prevention," The Global Center on Cooperative Security (September 2020).
- Franziska Praxl-Tabuchi, "Gendered Pathways to Radicalization and Desistance from Violent Extremism," The Global Center on Cooperative Security (April 2019).
- Junko Nozawa and Melissa Lefas, "When the Dust Settles: Judicial Responses to Terrorism in the Sahel " The Global Center on Cooperative Security (October 2018).
- Christopher Dean and Eelco Kessels, "Compendium of Good Practices in the Rehabilitation and Reintegration of Violent Extremist Offenders," The Global Center on Cooperative Security (August 2018).
- Peter Romaniuk, Tracey Durner, Lara Nonninger and Matthew Schwartz,"What Drives Violent Extremism in East Africa and How Should Development Actors Respond?" African Security 11, no. 2 (June 2018) 160-180.
- Peter Romaniuk and Tracey Durner, "The Politics of Preventing Violent Extremism: the Case of Uganda* Conflict, Security & Development 18, no. 2 (March 2018) 159-179.
- Eelco Kessels, "Managing, Rehabilitating, and Reintegrating Terrorism Offenders," Global Terrorism Index 2017 (November 2017) 92-94.
- Tracey Durner and Liat Shetret, "Understanding Bank De-risking and its Effects on Financial Inclusion " Oxfam (November 2015).
