= Joseph Gallup Cochran =

Early American Missionary to Qajar Iran

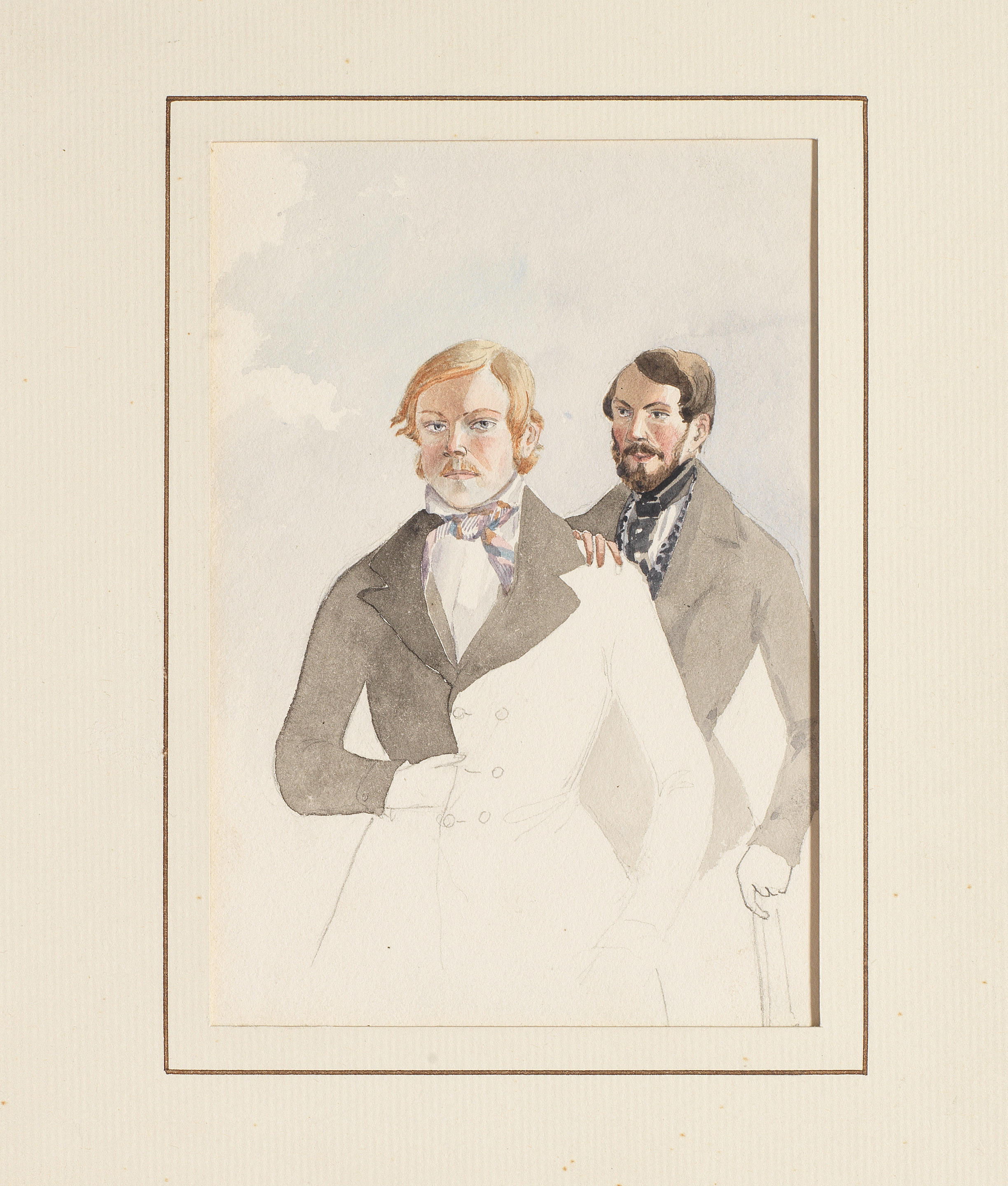
- Conrad Fagergren and Joseph Cochran during their visit to Tehran in late 1847, by Franz Colombari
- Born: 5 February 1817; Springville, New York, U.S.
- Died: 2 November 1871 (aged 64); Urmia, West Azerbaijan Province, Qajar Iran
- Resting place: American Mission Graveyard, Seer, West Azerbaijan Province, Iran
- Education: Amherst College, Union Theological Seminary
- Occupations: Missionary, Presbyterian minister, theologian, teacher, translator
- Known for: One of the early American missionaries to Iran
- Spouse: Deborah Wilson Plumb (m. 1847–1871; death)
- Children: 8, including Joseph Plumb Cochran

Joseph Gallup Cochran (1817–1871) was an American Presbyterian missionary to Qajar Iran, as well as a minister, theologian, teacher, and translator of ancient Syriac texts.

== Early life and education ==
Joseph Gallup Cochran was born 5 February 1817 in Springville, New York to parents Catharine (née Gallup) and Samuel Cochran. His father Samuel Cochran was Scottish and immigrated to the United States in the early 19th century, eventually becoming a founder of the town of Springville. The Cochran family had once fled Scotland to Derry due to King James. His mother was of French descent and was distantly related to Benjamin Franklin.

Cochran attended high school at Springville Academy (later known as Springville Griffith Institute). He attended Amherst College and graduated in 1842; followed by study at Union Theological Seminary from 1844 to 1847. Cochran was ordained on June 10, 1847, at Buffalo Presbyterian in Springville.

== Career ==
Shortly following his completion of studies, Cochran married Deborah Wilson Plumb in 1847 and they started the process to move to Qajar Iran under the sponsorship of the American Board of Commissioners for Foreign Missions (ABCFM). They landed in Urmia in June 1848.

He worked with the Assyrian Church of the East and the Christian Assyrian community (then known as "Nestorians", which is no longer a preferred term). Cochran served as the principal (and associate principal) at the mission seminary in the nearby town of Seer (also known as Seir) from 1849 to 1865, and again in 1865 to 1871. Cochran had been a prolific author and translator of Syriac, and this work helped better equip the missionary preachers and teachers. Additionally, he was able to preserve some of the ancient Syriac writings for future generations. He is thought to be the author of the anonymously published book, The Persian Flower: A Memoir of Judith Grant Perkins of Oroomiah, Persia (1853, Boston) about the daughter of fellow missionary Justin Perkins.

== Death and legacy ==
Cochran died on 2 November 1871 of typhoid fever in Urmia, and is buried at the American Mission Graveyard in the town of Seer. He also has a gravestone at the Maplewood Cemetery in Springville.

In the year he died, the ABCFM mission was turned over to the Presbyterians.

His son, Joseph Plumb Cochran, was a medical doctor and continued his missionary work in the West Azerbaijan Province.
