= Urmia University =

University in Urmia, Iran

- دانشگاه اروميه
- Former names: Westminster Medical College, Urmia College, University of Urmia
- Type: Public
- Established: 1879–1915; 1965–present
- Affiliations: Westminster Hospital, Cochran Memorial Hospital
- President: Ahmad Alijanpour
- Vice-Chancellor: Naser Nazariani
- Provost: Alireza Mozaffari
- Faculty: ~572
- Administrative staff: ~637
- Students: 15,000
- Undergraduates: 14,000
- Postgraduates: up to 1,000
- Location: (Iran) Urmia, West Azarbaijan Province, Iran; 37°39′24.82″N 44°59′12.42″E
- Campus: Urban & Suburban
- Athletics: several teams
- Colors: turquoise and white;
- Website: www.urmia.ac.ir

Urmia University (Persian: دانشگاه ارومیه, Daneshgah-e Orumiyeh) (also known as the University of Urmia) is a public university in West Azerbaijan province, Iran. The main campus of Urmia University is in Nazlu (or Nazloo), in the vicinity of Urmia. It has six campuses, seven schools, more than 14,000 students, and research centers including Microelectronic, Antenna and Microwave Laboratory, Nanotechnology, MEMS, and Artemia. Urmia University also has two satellite campuses in Khoy and Miyandoab city. Nazlu campus of Urmia University is the biggest university campus in size in the northwest of Iran. Urmia University is ranked as one of Iran's "Grade A" universities by the Iranian Ministry of Science, Research and Technology.

== History ==
=== Westminster Medical College (1879–1915) ===
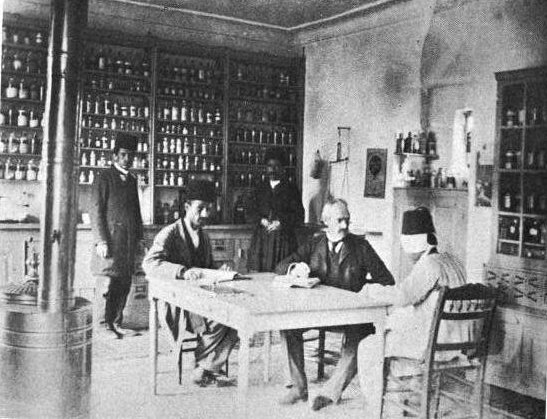
Joseph Plumb Cochran in the New Westminster Medical College at Urmia

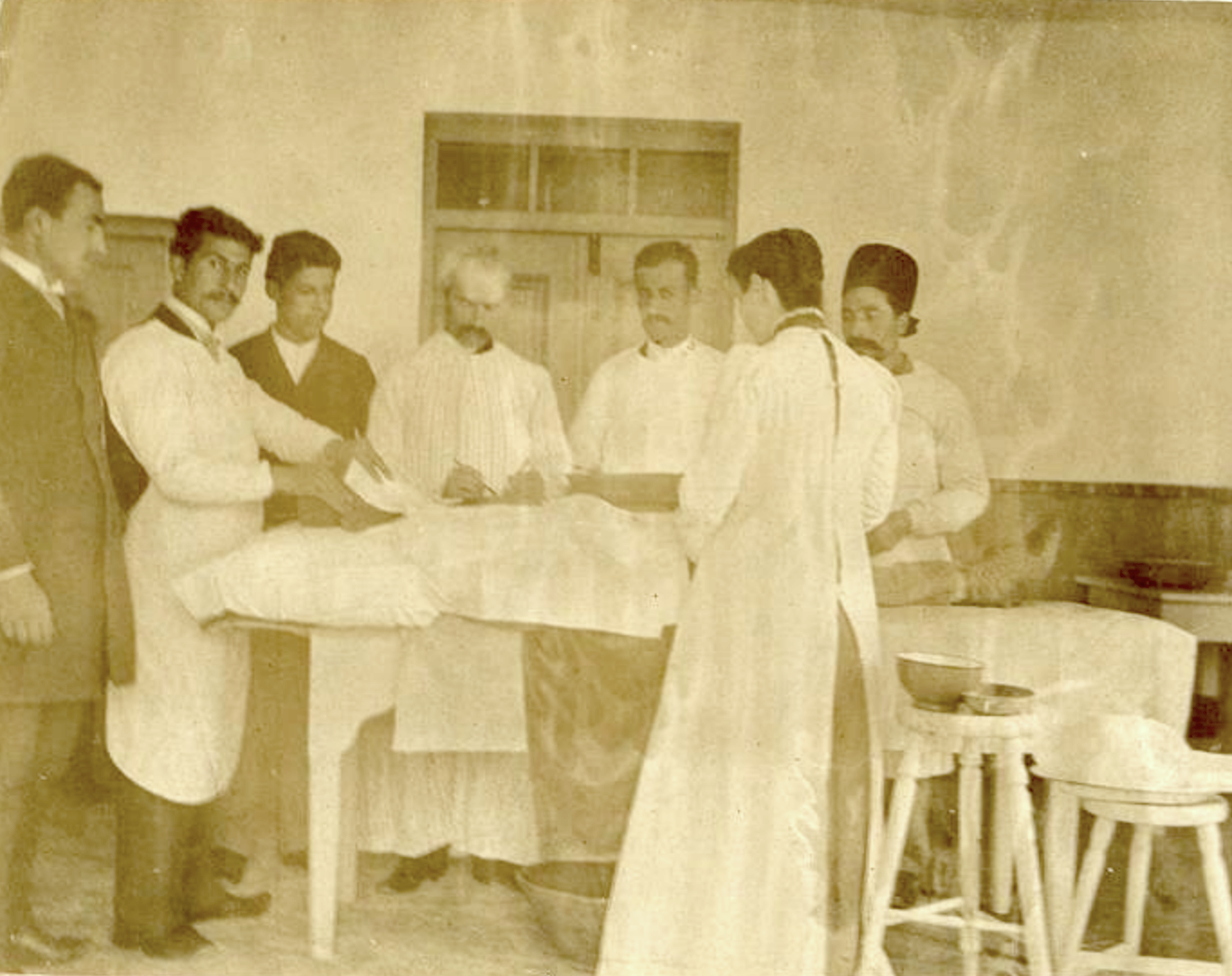
Urmia College medical classroom, circa 1900

Urmia University was founded on the site of the New Westminster Medical College (also known for its affiliated Old Westminster Hospital) which was established by Joseph Cochran in 1879. The Westminster Medical College was the first attempt to establish a higher education institution in Urmia. Cochran, an American citizen born in Urmia to Presbyterian missionary parents, spent his entire professional life developing it. The Urmia University website credits Cochran with "lowering the infant mortality rate in the region". Cochran also established the first modern Western hospital in Iran.

The medical faculty Cochran was joined by several other American medical doctors including Dr. Wright, Dr. Homlz, Thomas Langdon van Norden (1802–1871), and Emma T. Miller. They lived their entire lives in Urmia. S. Oshana Badal (1853–1911) was the first graduate in 1883. After graduating, Badal briefly went to Edinburgh at Cochran's request to further his education. On his return, he became Cochran's first assistant physician. Two princes of the Qajar dynasty, Mozaffar-ad-Din and Naser-ad-Din Shah, visited the Westminster Medical College in the winter of 1890; . Graduation certificates were jointly signed by Cochran and Mozaffar ad-Din Shah. After Cochran's death in 1905, Badal ran the school until his death in 1911. Both died of typhoid fever The school was briefly named Cochran Memorial Hospital after his death.

Harry P. Packard (1874–1954) took over the hospital and college in around 1906 until its closure in 1915. American doctors Laura McComb Muller and Wilder P. Ellis joined Packard prior to the closure of the school. In 1909, Emma T. Miller left the college and Urmia.

In 1907, Samuel Clement built the New Westminster Hospital in central Urmia.

=== Later re-establishment and developments (1965–present) ===
The foundation of the current Urmia University was laid in 1965 when the Agricultural College of Rezaeiye was established. In 1970, the Iranian Ministry of Science assigned further development of the college to the university. An agreement was signed between the Iranian government and the Near East Foundation in the United States to establish a four-year program. Later, Dr. Rassi established an exchange program with European and American schools. The complex was renamed the University of Rezaeye in 1977.

After the 1979 Iranian Revolution, the institution was renamed Urmia University. In 1980, the faculty of Medical Science was established. As part of the Iranian Ministry of Health, Urmia University of Medical Sciences detached itself from the main school in 1985. The Faculty of Humanitarian Science was established in 1989 and the Faculty of Engineering in 1990.

== Campuses ==
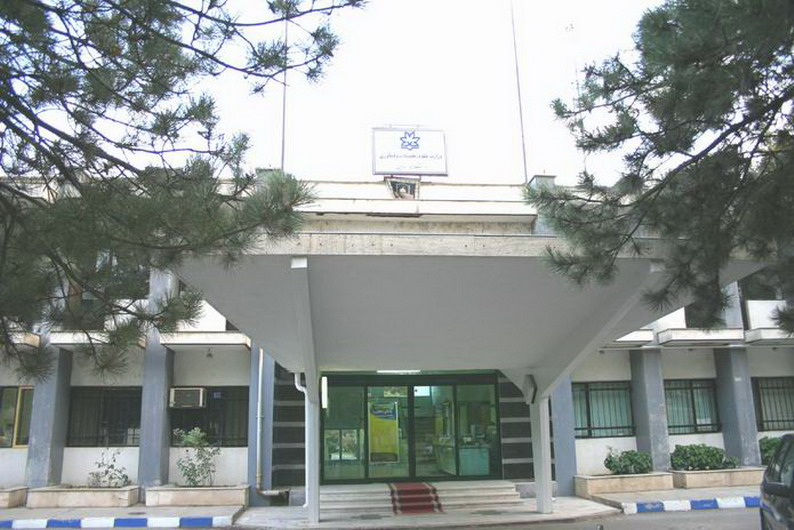
The old building of the administrative department of Urmia University in city campus.

Urmia University has six campuses, all of which are located in West Azarbaijan Provence:

- Nazlu campus, the main campus in Nazlu.
- City campus, in Urmia.
- Literature campus, in Urmia.
- School of Economics campus, in Urmia.
- School of Arts campus, in Urmia.
- Khoy campus, in Khoy, about 50 kilometers northwest of Urmia.

=== Buildings ===
Nowadays, most of the major buildings of Urmia University are in the Nazlu campus:

- Central Library
- School of Science
- School of Engineering
- School of Agriculture
- School of Medical Science
- Department of Natural Resources
- Department of Paramedical Science
- Animal Science Department
- Veterinary Science Building
- Classroom Building
- Enrollment office building
- Azadegan Gymnasium
- Chamran Auditorium
- Mosque
- Technology Park
- Central Restaurant
- North campus (boys' residence)
- South campus (girls' residence)
Urmia University buildings and campus

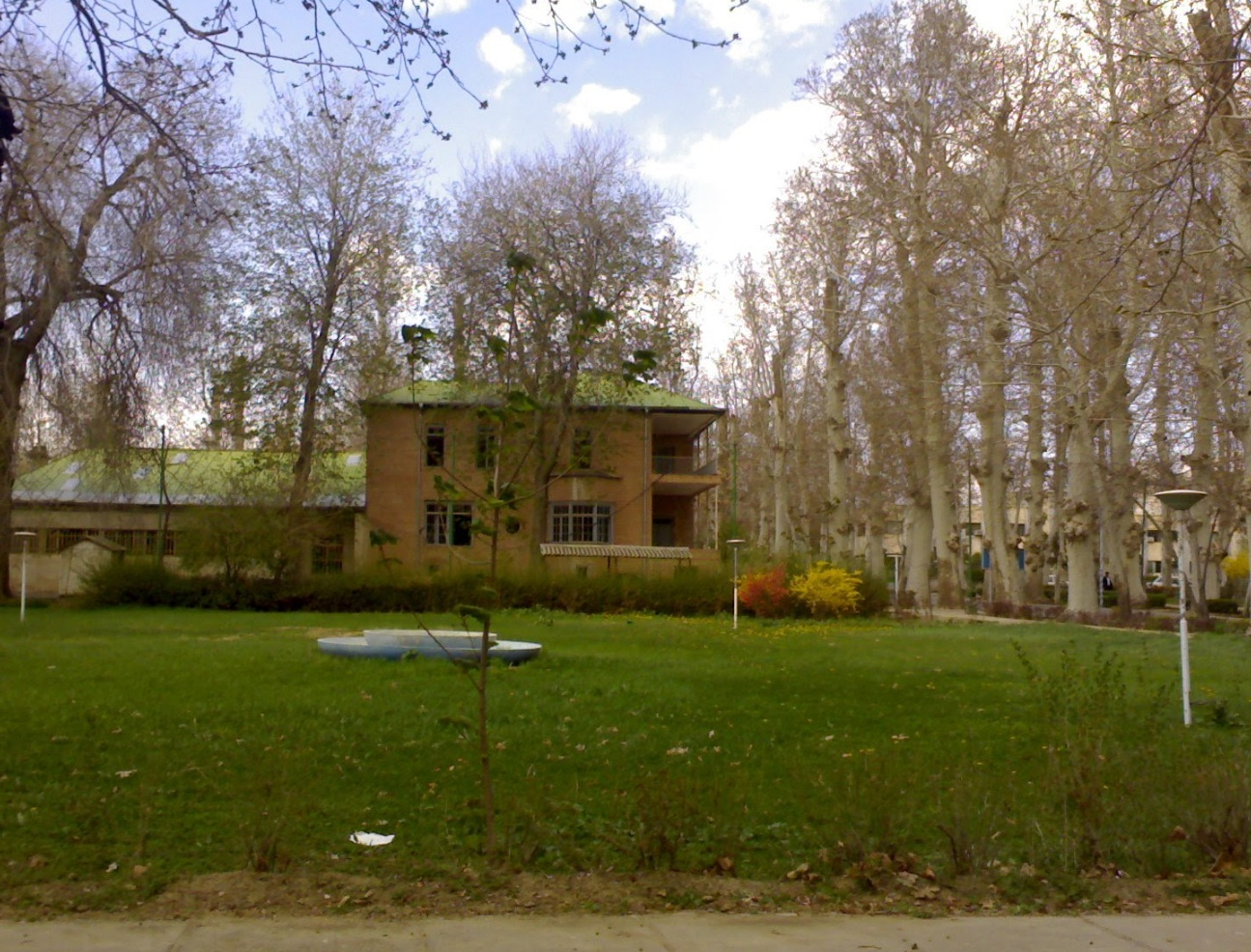
The Wooden Building

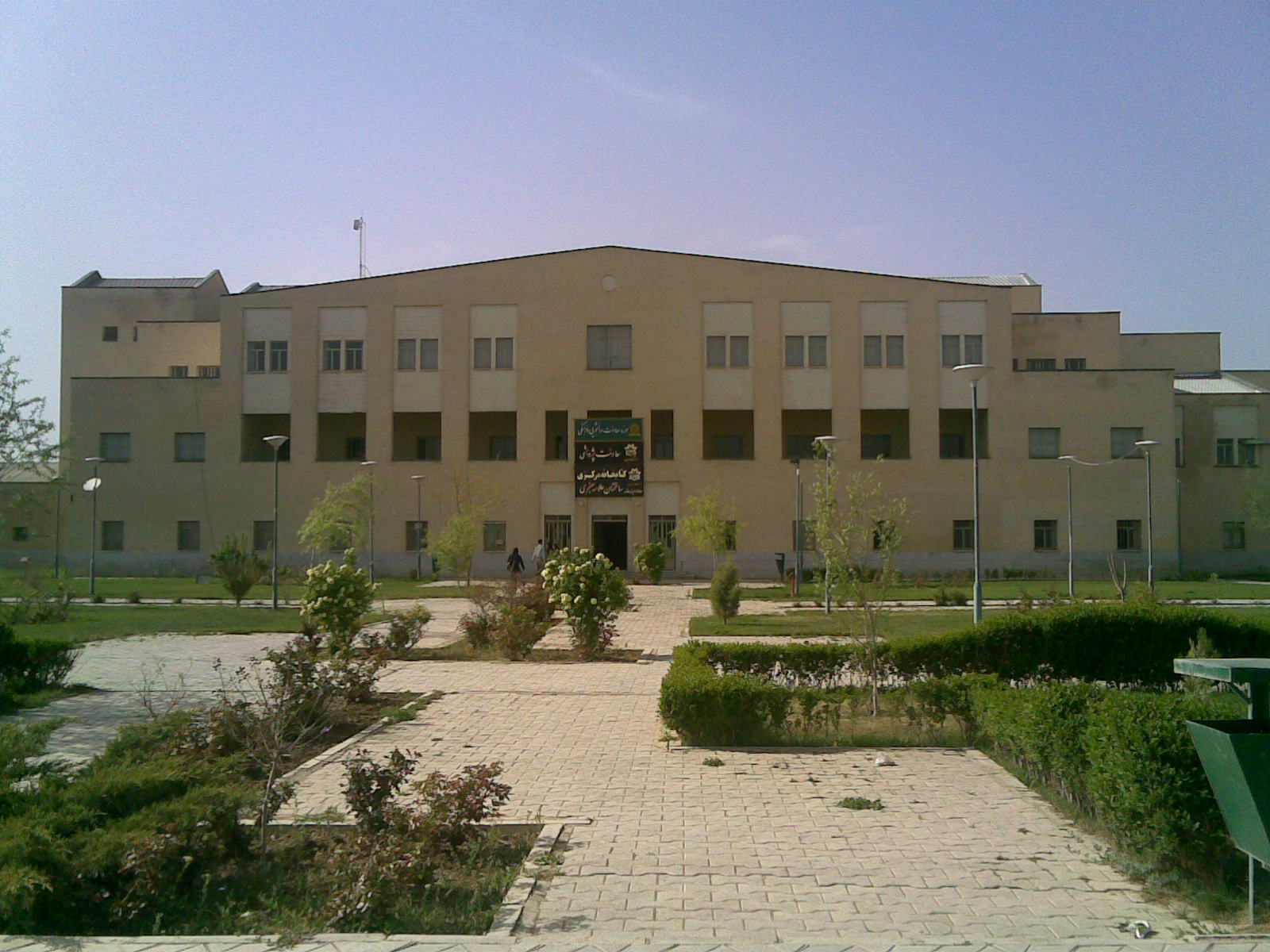
Central Library

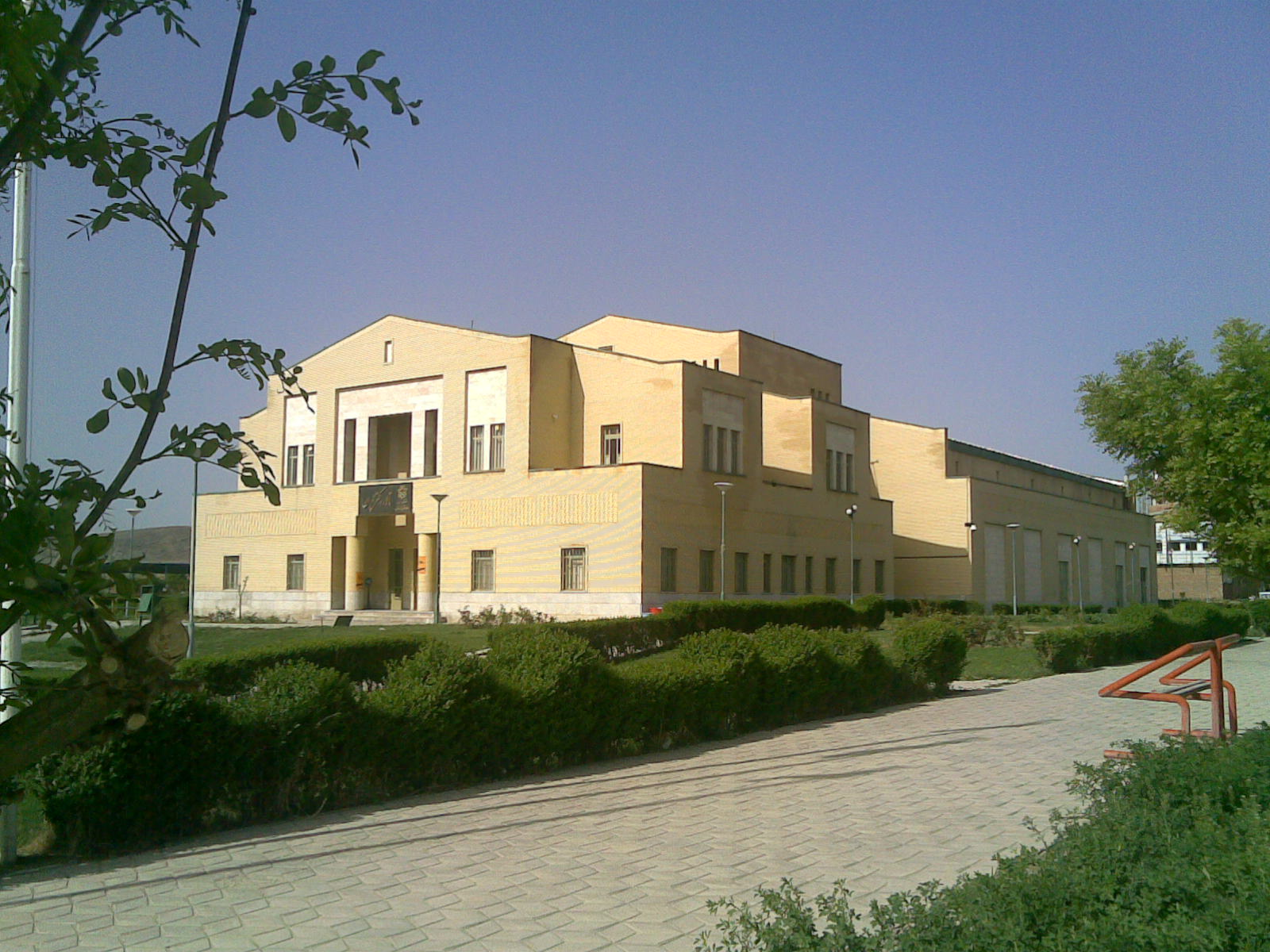
Chamran Auditorium

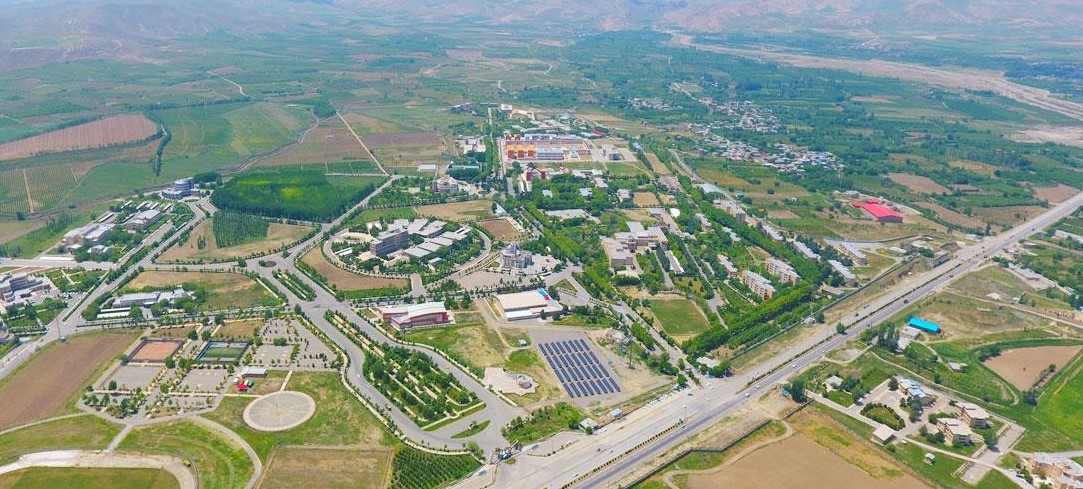
Bird's eye view of the Nazlu campus

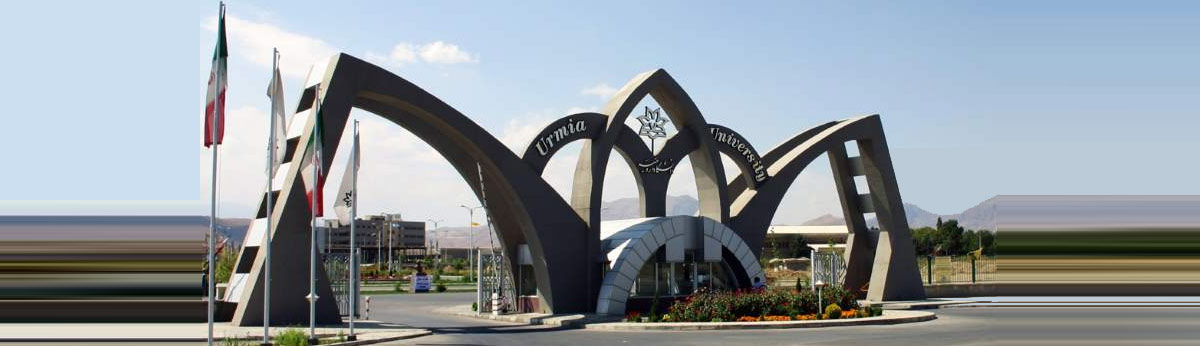
Nazlu campus façade

== Schools ==
Urmia University consists of eleven schools:

- School of Engineering
- School of Electrical Engineering
- School of Sciences
- School of Chemistry
- School of Humanities, Science and Literature
- School of Agriculture
- School of Economics and Management
- Faculty of Veterinary Science
- Faculty of Architecture, Urban Development and Art
- School of Natural Resources
- School of Sport Sciences

=== Research centers ===
- Artemia and Aquatic Animals Research Center (in English)Research activities related to Artemia and the ecosystem of Lake Urmia at Urmia University began with the establishment of the Artemia Research Laboratory in 1373 and then promoted to the Artemia and Aquatic Research Center by Dr. Nasir Agh. With the development of the Center's research activities in various fields and the establishment of new research groups in 2004, the research center was promoted to the Artemia and Aquaculture Research Institute.
- MicroElectronics Research Center (MRC) In 1996, a research group in the field of microelectronics was formed under the direction of Dr. Kh. A. Hadidi at Urmia University. In 2000, the research group received the license under the title of "Microelectronics Research Center" from the Ministry of Science, Research and Technology. In 2004, the center was upgraded to the Microelectronics Research Institute.
- Urmia MEMS Center (UMC) The center was established in 2004 with the investment of Iran's Industrial Development and Renovation Organization under the direction of Dr. E. Abbaspour. UMC is one of the most advanced technology projects in the country which has been built in an area of 10,000 square meters and with an infrastructure of 2,200 square meters at the city campus of Urmia University, in which the facilities and equipment of a semi-industrial clean room are located.
- Biological Sciences Research Center The Biomedical Research Center of Urmia University was established in 2000 with the approval of the Ministry of Science, Research and Technology. Currently, the Institute continues its work in four areas: agricultural biotechnology, cellular and molecular biotechnology, biotechnology, and biotechnology of pharmaceutical and industrial plants.
- Urmia Lake Research Institute (ULRI) Established in 1998 as part of Artemia and Aquatic Animals Research Institute, it has been upgraded to Urmia Lake Research Institute (ULRI) in 2013. The institute currently has 4 departments, 20 scientific staff and 5 laboratories. ULRI was involved in national and regional projects on Urmia Lake.
- Nanotechnology Center Since 2010, the nanotechnology institute of Urmia commenced the initial academic activities with taking MSc. students in nano-chemistry as well as nano-physics degrees. The nanotechnology institute of Urmia has taken laboratories comprising organic chemistry, thermo-analysis, electrochemistry, and nano-electronic as well as nano-composite.
- Computer Emergency Response Team The Urmia University Computer Emergency Response Team (CSIRT) has been set up to provide information, support, and relief, and focus on the Internet security of objects. The CSIRT of Urmia University, the only Internet security center in the province was established in 2016.

== Presidents ==
President	Tenure	Alma mater	Speciality
Joseph Plumb Cochran	1878–1899	(United States) New York Medical College	Medicine
S. Oshana Badal	1900–c. 1905	(Iran) Westminster Medical College	Medicine
Harry Phineas Packard	1906–1915	(United States) University of Denver	Medicine
Shabani	1965–1969		
Jafar Rassi	1969–1979	(United States) Cornell University	Education
Javad Farhoudi	1980–1982	(United Kingdom) University of Southampton	Hydraulic Structures Engineering
Ali Sarafraz Yazdi	1983–1986	(United Kingdom) University of Birmingham	Chemistry
Seyyed Mehdi Razavi Rouhani	1986–1996	(Iran) University of Tehran	Veterinary Science
Rahim Hobbenaghi	1997–2001	(Iran) University of Tehran	Veterinary Science
Goudarz Sadeghi-Hashjin	2001–2005	(Netherlands) Utrecht University	Pharmacology
Hassan Sedghi	2006–2014	(Australia) University of New South Wales	Solid State Physics
Rahim Hobbenaghi	2014–2021	(Iran) University of Tehran	Veterinary Science
Ahmad Alijanpour	2021–present	(Iran) University of Tehran	Forestry

== Notable alumni ==
- Isa Kalantari, former Minister of Agriculture and Vice President of Iran in environmental affairs.
- Mohammad Oraz, first Iranian national to successfully climb Mount Everest.

== See also ==
- List of universities in Iran
- Higher education in Iran
