= William Ambrose Shedd =

American Presbyterian missionary

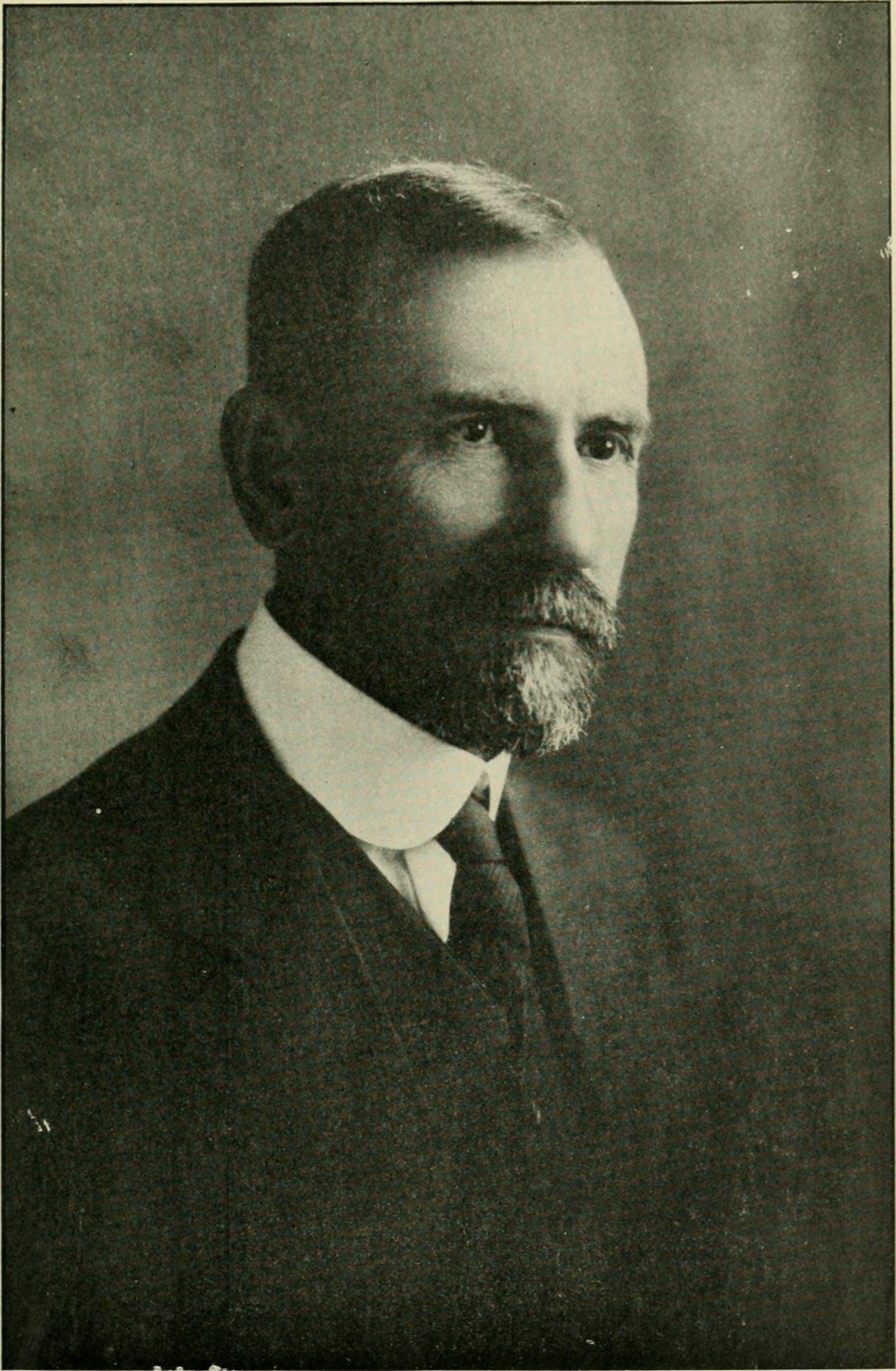
- Born: January 24, 1865; Seir
- Died: August 7, 1918 (aged 53); Sain Ghala
- Education: Marietta College, Princeton Theological Seminary
- Occupation: Missionary

William Ambrose Shedd (1865–1918) was an American Presbyterian missionary who served in Persia during the late Qajar era and the World War I conflict between the Russian and Ottoman empires in the neutral Persia.

He was born in Persia on January 24, 1865, in the little mountain village of Seir, overlooking the Urmia Plain, from missionary parents John Haskell Shedd and Sarah Jane Dawes Shedd, who had come to devote their lives helping the Assyrian community.

Upon the completion of his advanced theological studies at Princeton Theological Seminary in 1892, he returned to Iran and as a missionary of the Presbyterian Board of Foreign Missions. He spent most of the rest of his life among the Assyrian Christians of northwestern Iran. In 1904 he published a book called Islam and the Oriental Churches: Their historical relations. An unpublished manuscript of his which was near completion by 1912 was discovered by his descendants in 2020, containing a biography of his father, titled The Life of John Haskell Shedd and was published in 2023.

Towards the end of the nineteenth century, Shedd's leadership responsibilities as a missionary grew. In the years leading to WWI, the influx of refugees fleeing the geo-political tensions in the Turco-Persian border region increased the humanitarian demands on the Urmia mission station. During WWI, Shedd briefly visited America to increase the American public's awareness of the refugee crisis in the region and successfully raised funds to support relief efforts. As WWI and related regional conflicts intensified, upon his return to Urmia, he attempted to reconcile the differences between the Assyrians and the Persians, but without much success.

In July 1918 after the Ottoman army advanced toward Urmia, the mass flight of 70,000 Assyrian Christians from Urmia to the safety of British-occupied Hamadan began. William Shedd and his wife, Mary Lewis Shedd, were among the Assyrians in this flight. When they had reached Sain Ghala, he died of cholera and was buried there. His body was later recovered by his wife and reburied in the Armenian Cemetery of Tabriz where his gravestone still stands.

Russian writer Viktor Shklovsky, who was in Urmia in late 1917, mentioned Shedd's activities in his memoirs Sentimental'noe puteshestvie, vospominaniia (A Sentimental Journey) as one of the encouraging examples of humanism amidst the violence Shklovsky witnessed in Persia and Russia in 1917-20.

== Publications ==
Shedd’s books include;

- Bahaism and its claims, 1911
- Historical sketch of the missions in Persia, 1911
- Islam and the Oriental Churches

== Children ==
With Adela, William had two daughters, Susan and Daisy; with his second wife, Louise Wilbur Shedd, he later had two more daughters, Bertha and Louise. Grown to adults, these daughters married and added the names: Susan Shedd Richards, Daisy Shedd Kisich, Bertha Shedd Mason, and Louise Shedd Barker.
