= Joseph Cochran =

Joseph Plumb Cochran
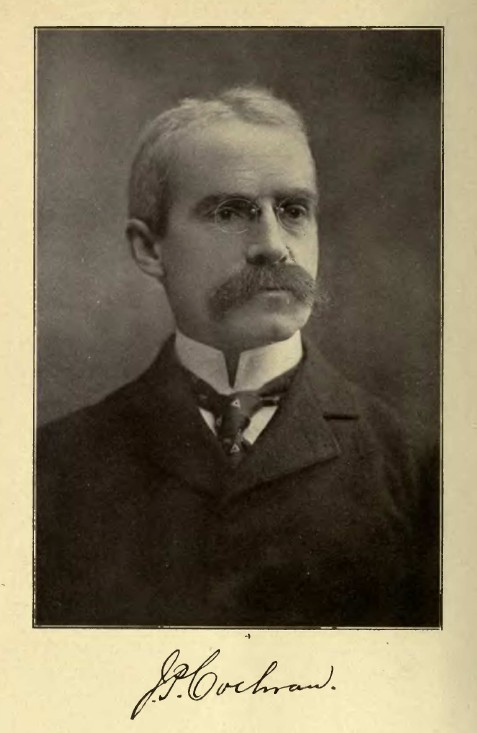
- Born: January 14, 1855; Urmia, West Azerbaijan, Qajar Iran
- Died: August 18, 1905 (aged 50); Urmia, West Azerbaijan, Qajar Iran
- Burial place: American Mission Graveyard, Seer, West Azerbaijan Province, Iran
- Education: New York Medical College
- Occupations: Presbyterian missionary, medical doctor, school founder
- Spouses: Katherine Talcott Hale, Bertha Hamilton McConaughy
- Father: Joseph Gallup Cochran

Joseph Plumb Cochran, M.D. (January 14, 1855 – August 18, 1905), was an American Presbyterian missionary and medical doctor. He is credited as the founding father of Iran's first modern Western medical school, Westminster College (now Urmia University) in 1879.

== Early life ==
Joseph Plumb Cochran was one of the eight children of Cochran's family, he was born in 1855 in Urmia, Qajar Iran. He had a happy childhood in the company of his large family and friends. He learned the local languages of Assyrian, Azerbaijani and Kurdish, in addition to English and Persian.

Joseph Cochran's father was the Reverend Joseph Gallup Cochran (1817–1871), and his mother, Deborah Wilson Plumb (1820–1893). His parents were first-generation American missionaries sponsored by the American Board of Commissioners for Foreign Missions (ABCFM), who traveled to Iran and arrived in June 1848. They settled in Urmia and nearby village of Seer in West Azerbaijan Province, Qajar Iran; the home to the people of the ancient culture of Urartu and of one of the earliest Christian churches, the Assyrian Church of the East. The family devoted their missionary zeal to the well-being of the local population, many of whom were devout Christians.

== Education ==
He left for America as a teenager in 1868, staying in Buffalo, New York with the family of Stephen Mallory Clement (1825–1892), the father of Stephen Merrell Clement, who was to help finance not only Joseph Cochran's education, but also his hospital. He studied medicine at New York Medical College, from where he graduated in 1876. Subsequently, he did two years of practical hospital work in surgery, infectious diseases and gynecology. During a travel to Minnesota he met his future wife, Katherine Talcott Hale.

== Medical career in Urmia ==
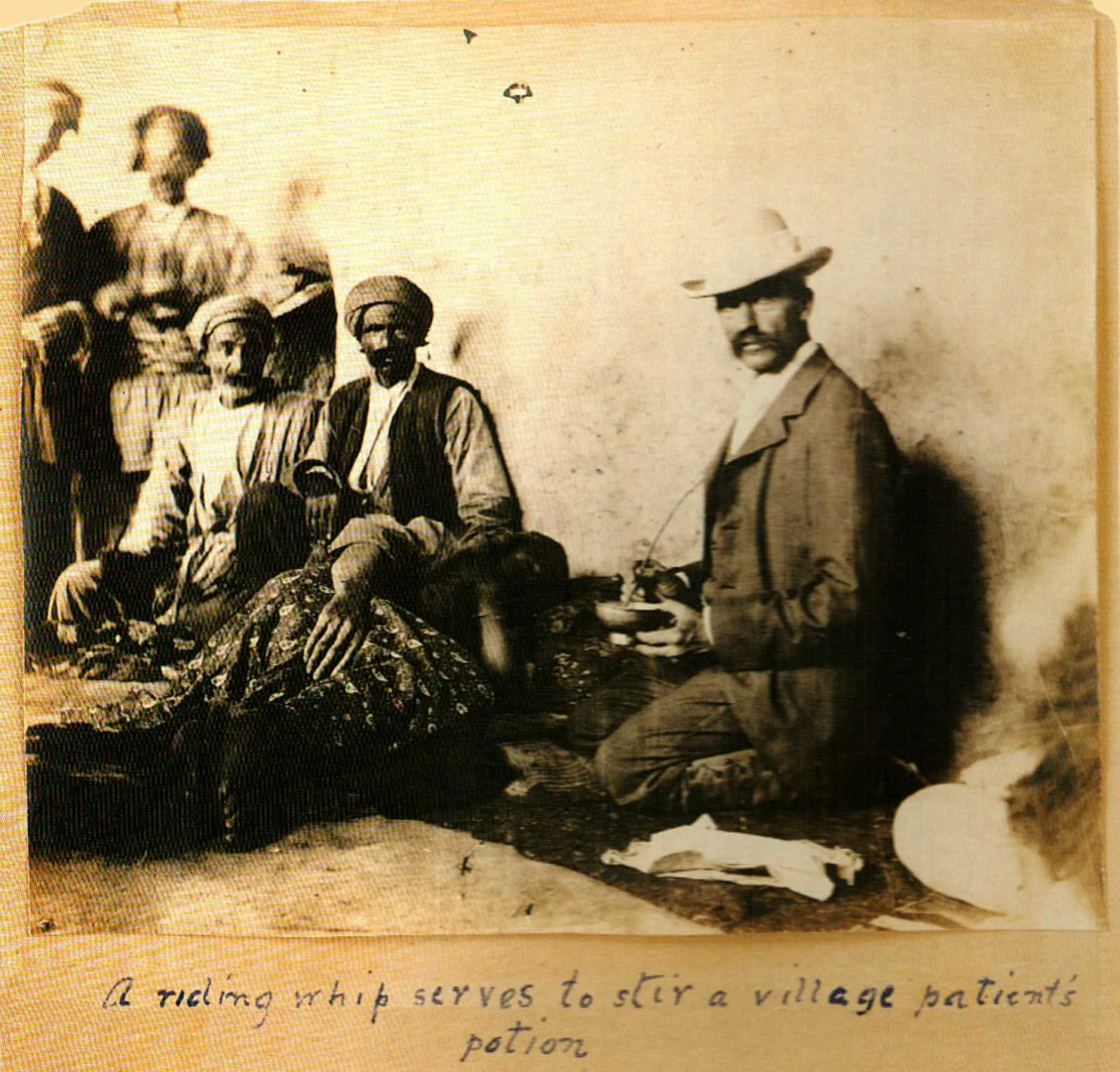
Joseph Plumb Cochran working in a Christian mission in Urmia, Iran in the 1890s

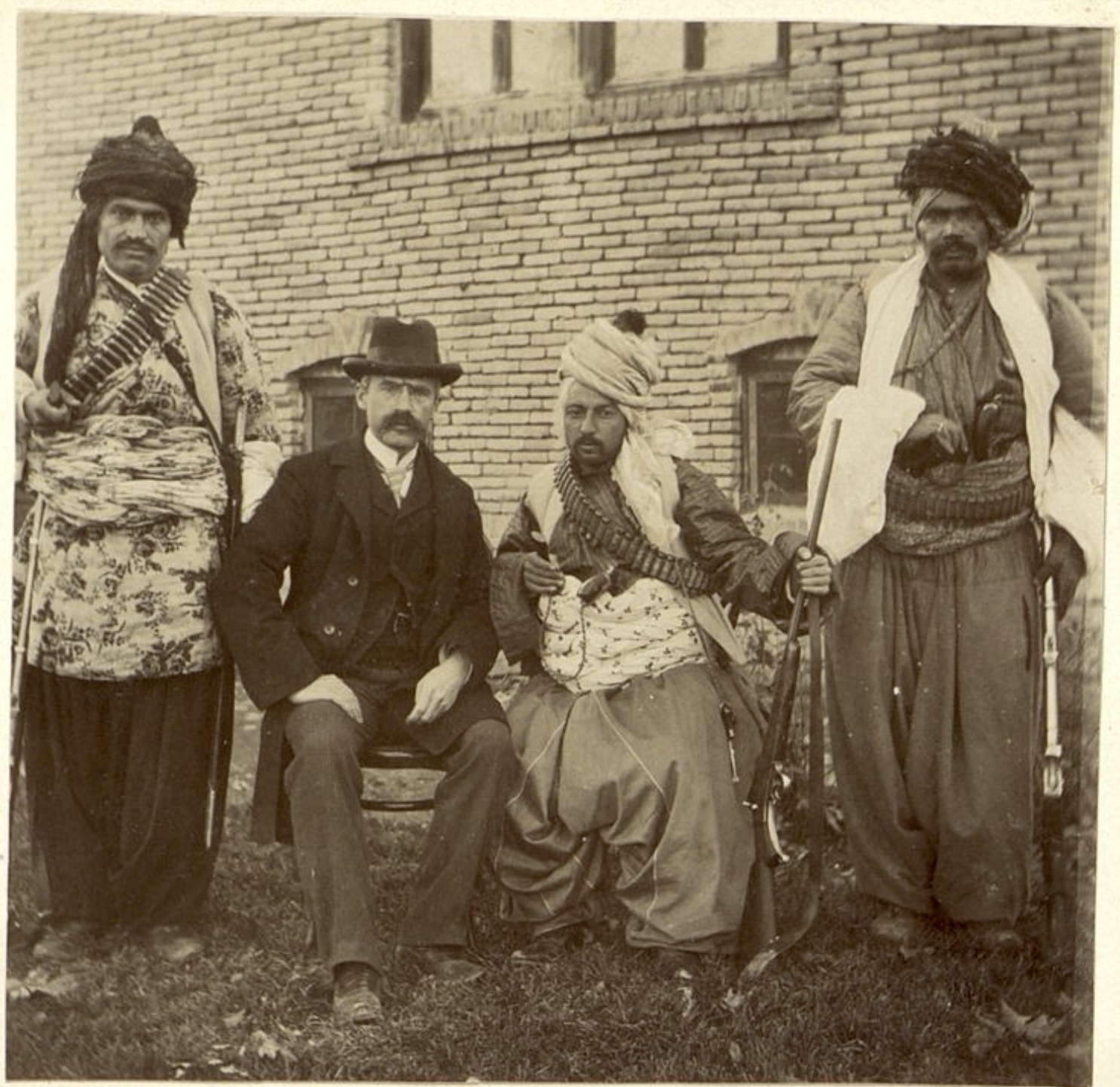
Cochran with Kurdish tribesmen, c. 1900

He was assigned by the Presbyterian Board of Foreign Missions as a missionary physician to Persia and returned to Urmia with his wife. The young couple went to Urmia, Iran in 1878. On Joseph's earnest request, and with funding from congregation members of the Westminster Church of Buffalo and the Presbyterian Board of Foreign Missions (operated by the Presbyterian Church in the United States of America; PCUSA) a 15-acre lot of land was purchased which became the site of Iran's first medical college, as well as missionary residences, and eventually a college. The 100-bed hospital was named Westminster Hospital, after the church in Buffalo, New York that was the vehicle for supporting Cochran's work. The building of this hospital was completed in 1882.

Cochran resolved the problem of shortage in the local medical professionals by establishing a modern medical school, Westminster College (1879–1915), the first of its kind in Iran. For this purpose, he erected a wooden building, which included a research laboratory, near the hospital, where the future medical personnel were to be trained. Remarkably, this original wooden building, near the present-day Urmia Medical School, is still intact. An adjoining maternity hospital was built later, for which the required medical equipment arrived from America.

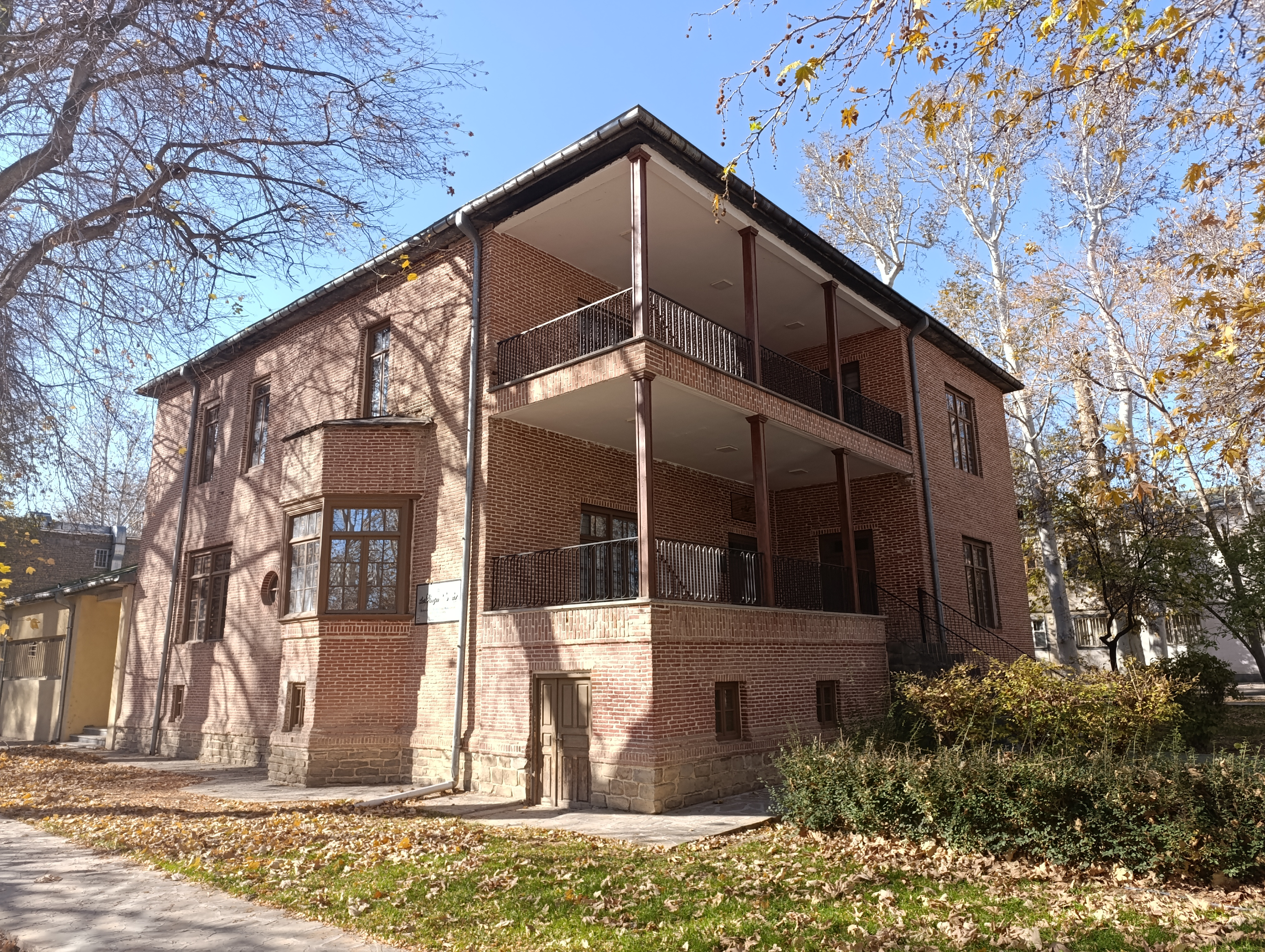
Joseph Cochran's home, pardis of Urmia University

According to the information provided by the official website of Urmia University, Joseph Cochran has been [the first] director of the Medical School in Urmia, established in 1878. In the course of Cochran's 27 years of directorship, 26 medical students graduated from this school. This school was closed on Joseph Cochran's death in 1905 and remained in this state until sixty years later when it was opened as one of several Schools of Urmia University. The historical archives of Urmia University is in the possession of documents that show that Mozaffar al-Din Shah Qajar and Joseph Cochran have personally signed and handed certificates to graduating students during the graduation ceremony of 1898 (1277 AH).

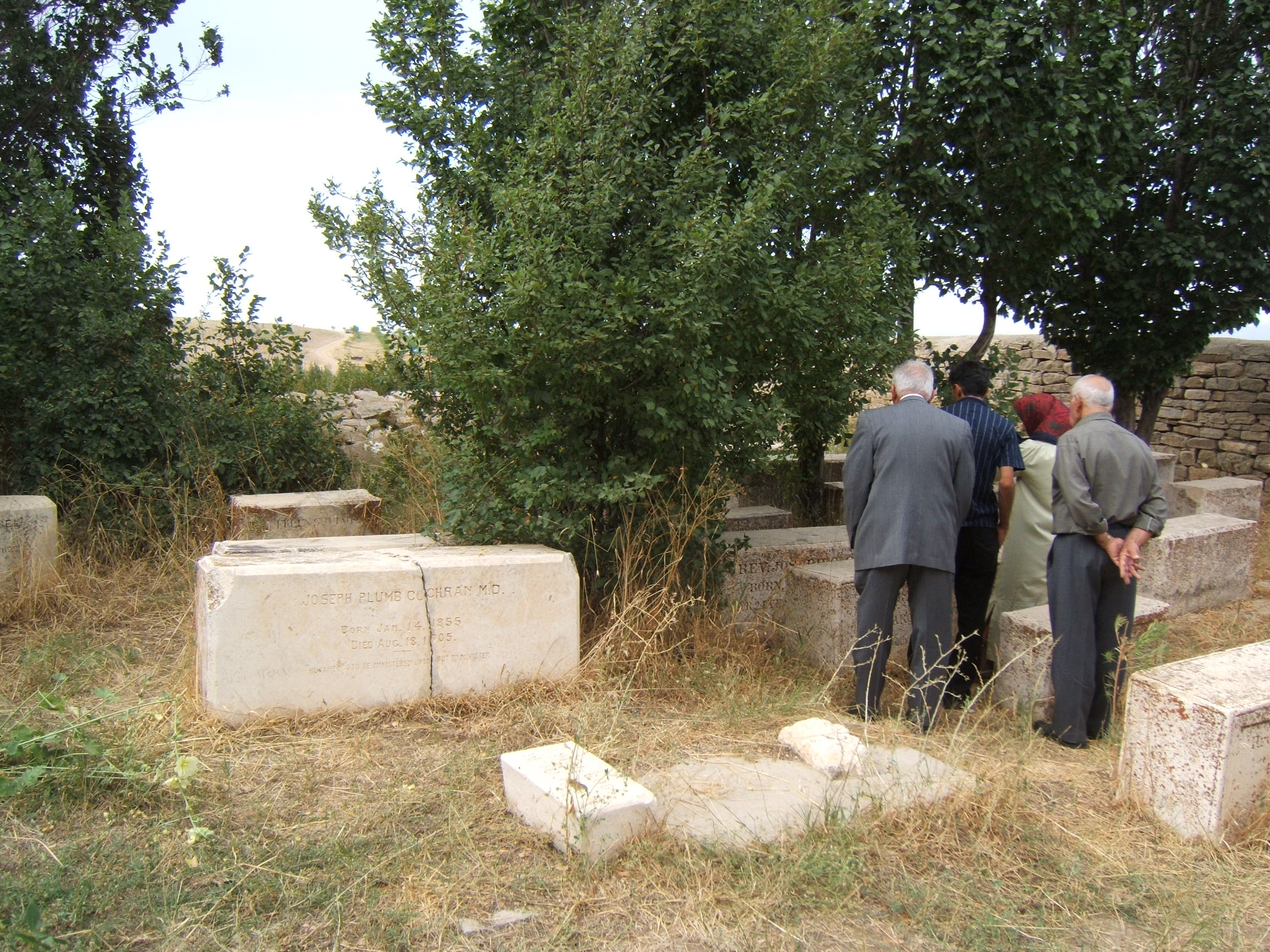
American Mission Graveyard, Seer, Iran

During the above-mentioned period, Cochran was joined by other American medical doctors, including Dr Wright, Dr Homlz, Thomas Langdon van Norden, and Emma T. Miller, who remained permanently in Iran.

== Death and legacy ==
Joseph Cochran died of Typhoid fever in Urmia at the age of 50, on 18 August 1905, on the second floor of his wooden house in the medical school. His death was mourned by many. According to reports, his funeral was attended by tens of thousands people. His resting place is in the American Mission Graveyard in the village of Seer, located on the side of Seer Mountain (sometimes spelled as Sir or Seir), where deceased American missionaries and their families were laid to rest. His epitaph reads: "He came not to be ministered unto, but to minister."

His son, Joseph Cochran, Jr, returning to Iran in 1920, followed in his father's footsteps through his services in the American Mission Hospital. His daughter, Dorothy Cochran-Romson, served for a short time as a missionary nurse in Tabriz capital East Azerbaijan Province in Iran.

== See also ==
- Urmia University
- U.S.-Iran relations
- History of Iran
- Famous Americans in Iran
