= William Greenough Thayer Shedd =

American Presbyterian theologian (1820–1894)

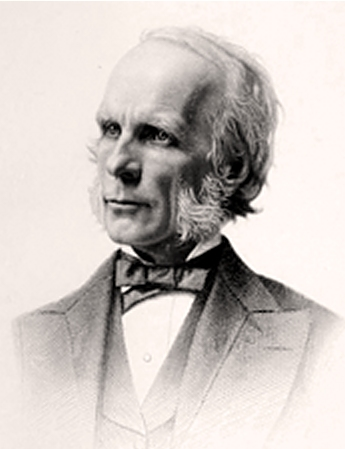
- Born: June 21, 1820; Acton, Massachusetts
- Died: November 17, 1894 (aged 74); New York, New York
- Education: University of Vermont; Andover Theological Seminary
- Occupations: Theologian, professor
- Notable work: Dogmatic Theology

William Greenough Thayer Shedd (June 21, 1820 – November 17, 1894) was an American Presbyterian theologian from Massachusetts. He also served as a professor of theology at Union Theological Seminary in New York for over sixteen years.

== Life ==
William Greenough Thayer Shedd was the son of the Reverend Marshall Shedd and Eliza Thayer and was born in Acton, Massachusetts on June 21, 1820.

In 1835, Shedd enrolled at the University of Vermont and became a protégé of UVM president James Marsh. Under the influence of his mentor, Shedd was deeply affected by the thought of Samuel Taylor Coleridge and Transcendentalism. He graduated from UVM in 1839 and taught school for one year, during which time he began to attend the Presbyterian church. Being called to the ministry, Shedd entered Andover Theological Seminary in 1840 and studied under theologian Leonard Woods. He graduated in 1843.

After a short pastorate at Brandon, Vermont, he was successively professor of English literature at the University of Vermont (1845–1852), professor of sacred rhetoric in Auburn Theological Seminary (1852–1854), professor of church history in Andover Theological Seminary (1854–1862), and, after one year as associate pastor of the Brick Church of New York City (1862–1863), professor of sacred literature (1863–1874) and of systematic theology (1874–1890) in Union Theological Seminary. He died in New York City on November 17, 1894.

Shedd's writings reveal the interplay of various intellectual voices such as Kant, Darwin, Emerson, Coleridge, Calvin, Locke, and German intellectuals such as Fichte and Schiller. He was known for his teachings on eternal punishment and damnation, his most notable work, Dogmatic Theology, devotes 56 pages to the topic, as opposed to only 2 pages on heaven.

== Published works ==
Dr. Shedd was a High Calvinist and was one of the most notable systematic theologians of the American Presbyterian church. His great work was Dogmatic Theology (3 vols, 1888–1894). He served as editor of Coleridge's Complete Works (7 vols, New York, 1894). He also wrote:

- The Influence of Temperance Upon Intellectual Discipline: A Discourse Delivered Before the Temperance Society of the University of Vermont (1844)
- Lectures on the Philosophy of History (1856), in which he applied to history the doctrine of organic evolution
- Discourses and Essays (1856)
- A Manual of Church History (2 vols, 1857), a translation of Guericke
- A History of Christian Doctrine (2 vols, 1863)
- Homiletics and Pastoral Theology (1867)
- Sermons to the Natural Man (1871)
- Theological Essays (1877)
- Literary Essays (1878)
- Commentary on the Epistle to the Romans (1879)
- Sermons to the Spiritual Man (1884)
- The Doctrine of Endless Punishment (1885)
- Introductory Essay on Augustine's De Trinitate, 1 February 1887.
