= Iran–Sweden relations =

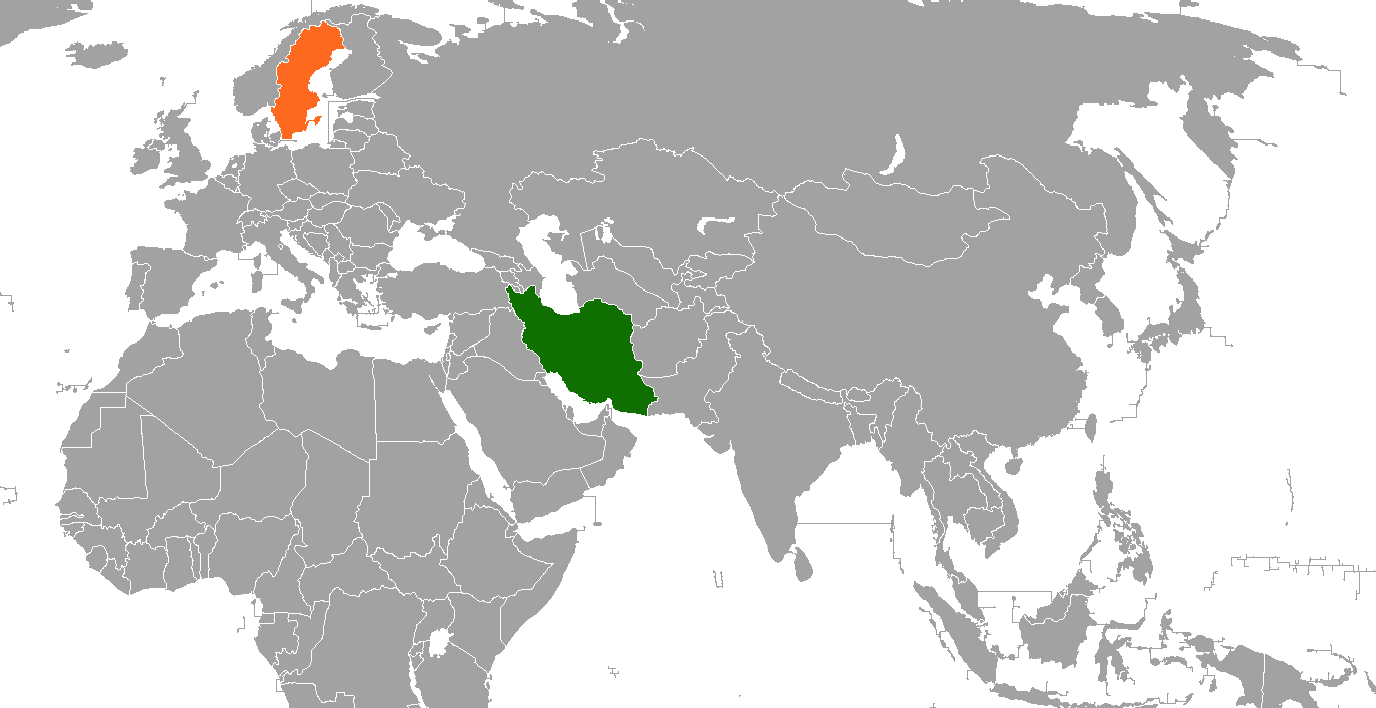

- Iran: Sweden

Diplomatic mission
- Embassy of Iran, Stockholm: Embassy of Sweden, Tehran

The Islamic Republic of Iran and the Kingdom of Sweden maintain foreign relations. Among all Scandinavian countries, Sweden has the strongest and most extensive relationship with Iran. Formal diplomatic relations were established in 1929. Sweden played an important role in modernizing parts of Iran’s police force during the late Qajar era.

From the 8th to the 11th centuries, Swedish Vikings traveled down the Russian rivers to the Caspian Sea, reaching near Iran. They acted only as traders and mercenaries, exchanging furs, amber, and weapons for the silver. The strongest evidence of Persian-Swedish Vikings relationship comes from archaeological discoveries, where tens of thousands of Persian coins have been unearthed in Viking hoards in Sweden. In addition to coins, archaeologists have found Persian textiles, beads, and metalwork in Viking graves across Sweden.

== History ==
=== Safavid Iran Era ===
Ludvig Fabritius led three missions to Safavid Persia, in 1679–80, 1683–84, and 1697–1700, to the Safavid court during the reign of Charles XI of Sweden (r. 1660–1697) and Charles XII of Sweden (r. 1697–1718); and Suleiman of Persia (26 October 1666 – 29 July 1694 ), Sultan Husayn (29 July 1694 – 11 September 1722).

=== Qajar Iran Era ===
In 1911, the Swedish government was asked by the Persians if soldiers could be sent to Qajar Persia to organize the construction of a gendarmerie. In the same year, the first Swedish officers came to the country. This became the Iranian Gendarmerie, commanded by Swedish officers between 1911 and 1921. The first Swedish officers traveled to Persia in 1911, and during the period 1911-1916, a total of about sixty Swedes worked in the country. The police force was equipped by the Swedish police. When World War I broke out, the Swedes were accused of cooperating with Germany, which resulted in the officers and police having to leave Persia.

=== Pahlavi Era (1925-1979) ===
Sweden and Pahlavi Iran established diplomatic relations in connection with the conclusion of a treaty of friendship in 1929. Iran operates an embassy in Stockholm and Sweden operates an embassy in Tehran.

In November 1934, Swedish Crown Prince Gustaf Adolf, Crown Princess Margaret, Princess Ingrid and Prince Bertil visited Iran. At the border, they were received by a representative of the Persian government and in Tehran by the Foreign Minister and the Grand Master of the Ceremonies, as well as representatives of the government agencies. The Crown Prince's family went in a procession to the castle, where the Shah and the Crown Prince represented the council president and others. Reza Shah then accompanied the Crown Prince to the Golestan Palace. After several days in the Persian capital, the Crown Prince left for the Mazandaran Province to study for three days the ongoing construction work on the Trans-Iranian Railway. He then returned to Tehran to say goodbye to the Shah. The Crown Prince's family then left on 17 November in Volvo cars for Isfahan and Persepolis. In the latter place, the royals lived in the so-called Xerxes' harem and visited the city under the leadership of Professor Ernst Herzfeld. An excursion was made to Shiraz. On 25 November, the return journey to Baghdad began over the snowy passes along the Kum-Sultanabad-Kermanshah road.

=== Islamic Republic Era (1979-) ===
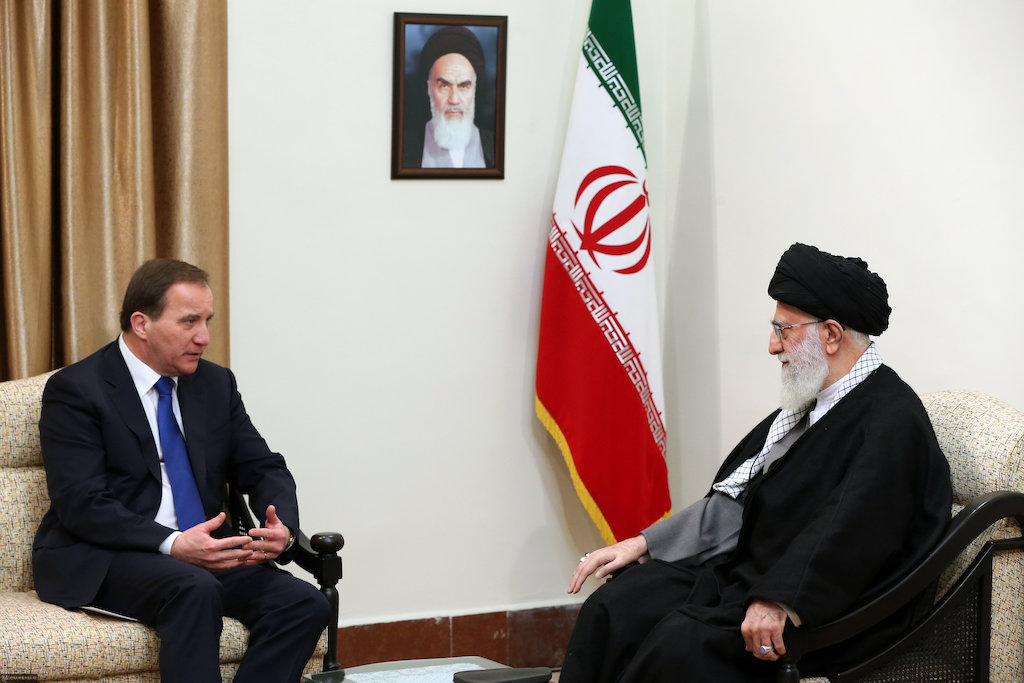
Swedish Prime Minister Stefan Löfven with Iranian Supreme Leader Ali Khamenei, February 11, 2017

In April 2016, Ahmad Reza Djalali, an Iranian-Swedish doctor and researcher in disaster medicine, was arrested and charged with spying on Iranian's nuclear program for Israel, accusations he denied, before being taken to the Evin Prison, where he reportedly faced repeated tortures and threats. In October 2017, Djalali was convicted of "spreading corruption on earth" and sentenced to death: multiple reports about the time of his execution have surfaced ever since.

In 2021, tensions escalated between Iran and Sweden over the trial of Hamid Nouri, a former Iranian official convicted in Sweden of committing grave war crimes and murder during the Iran-Iraq War and the 1988 executions of Iranian political prisoners.

In May 2023, Habib Chaab, an Iranian-Swedish political activist, founder and former leader of Arab Struggle Movement for the Liberation of Ahvaz, was executed by hanging in Iran, after being accused of masterminding a 2018 attack on a military parade that killed 25 people.

In September 2023, a New York Times article revealed that Johan Floderus, a 33-year-old Swedish man who had been working as a diplomat for the European Union since 2019, had been arrested at the Imam Khomeini International Airport while on holiday in Tehran in April 2022, being subsequently taken to the Evin Prison. On 15 June 2024, Swedish Prime Minister Ulf Kristersson publicly announced that Floderus had been released from Iranian authorities, together with fellow Swedish prisoner Saeed Azizi, as part of a prisoner exchange deal that saw convicted war criminal Hamid Nouri return to Iran.

In September 2024, Swedish authorities revealed that a cyber group called Anzu, operating under Iran's Islamic Revolutionary Guard Corps (IRGC), were responsible for hacking into a Swedish text messaging service in July 2023, taking over passwords, usernames and other tools, and sending thousands of messages calling Swedes "demons" and bearing instructions to exact vengeance upon Koran burners. Iran denied the accusation, though the investigation by the Swedish Prosecution Authority managed to identify the individual hackers responsible for the data breach. In a statement by Justice Minister Gunnar Strömmer it was said that the goal was to destabilise Sweden or increase polarisation, and the security service warned that Iran is among those seeking to create division and bolster their own regimes.

In March 2026, during the Iran war, Sweden's Security Service (SAPO) identified Iran as one of the country's three main security threats alongside China and Russia.

On 16 September 2026, Sweden expelled an Iranian embassy employee and summoned Iran's ambassador, saying that Tehran had threatened Jewish and Israeli interests in Sweden. The Swedish Foreign Ministry said the employee had to leave the country because of activities that did not follow diplomatic rules. Swedish Foreign Minister Maria Malmer Stenergard said the decision was made to protect Swedish citizens and Sweden's interests.

== Government level ==
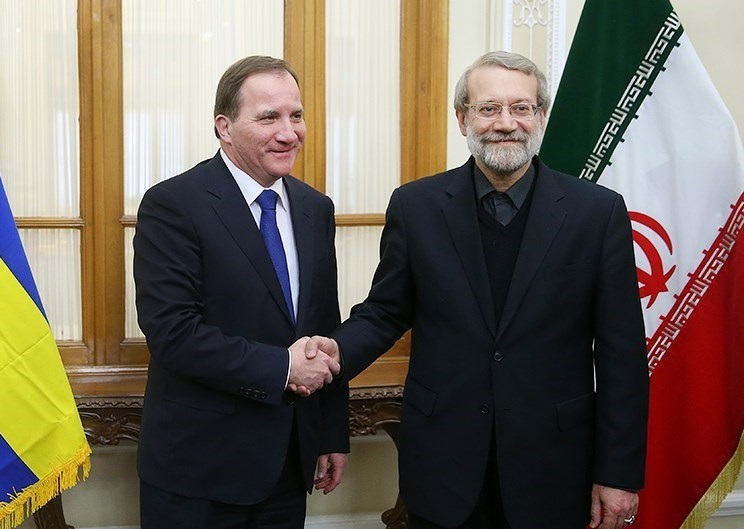
Ali Larijani, chairman of Iran's parliament meets with Swedish Prime Minister Stefan Löfven in the Parliament building, Tehran.

In February 2017, Swedish prime minister Stefan Löfven and minister of trade Ann Linde, along with representatives from government agencies and companies, visited Iran and met with several Iranian ministers. Linde was criticized for wearing the Islamic veil during the trip, even though it is law and must even be worn in the embassy in Sweden.

== Academic partnerships ==
In the late 2010s and into 2020, a number of Swedish academic universities and institutions pursued partnerships and exchange programs with institutions in Iran, also after Swedish-Iranian researcher Ahmad Reza Jalali was given the death penalty by Iranian authorities in October 2017. These academic institutions were:

- Lund University
- Chalmers University of Technology
- Linnaeus University
- Malmö University
- KTH Royal Institute of Technology
- University of Borås
- Halmstad University
- University of Gothenburg
- Mälardalen University College
- Luleå University of Technology
- Jönköping University
- Gävle University College
- University of Skövde

== Nuclear program ==
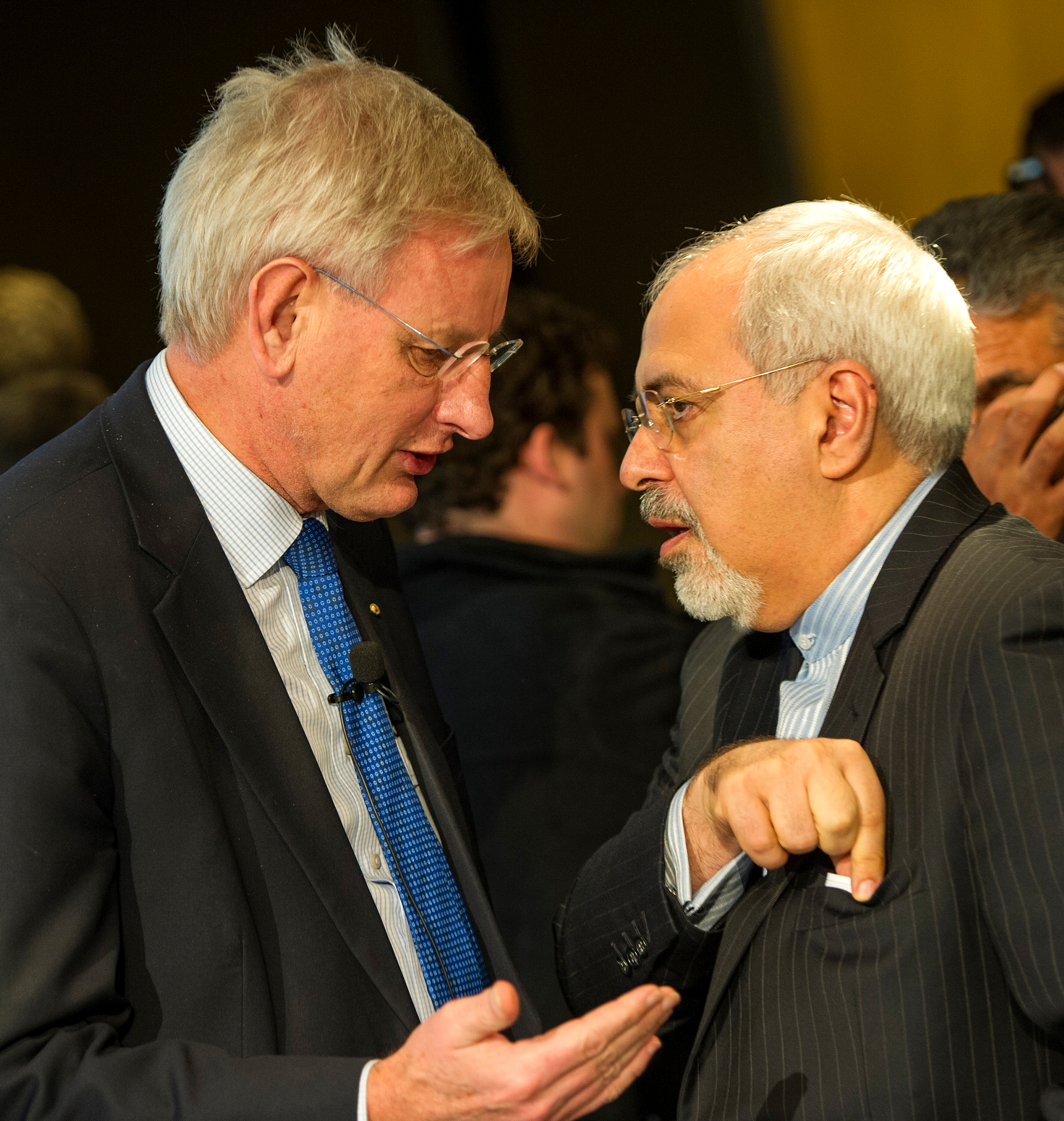
Bildt and Javad Zarif, foreign minister of Iran, 2 February 2014

The Chairman of the Swedish Parliament's Foreign Policy Commission said in 2008 that Iran has a right to civilian nuclear technology. He also supported diplomatic means to find a solution to the issue that was acceptable to both sides. In 2007, Christofer Gyllenstierna, the Swedish Ambassador to Iran, claimed that because traders and businessmen ultimately make investment decisions in Sweden, economic sanctions would not affect Sweden's trade with Iran. In February 2009, Greece, Cyprus, Spain, Austria and Sweden opposed a list of additional stricter sanctions proposed by the EU3 against the Islamic Republic.

In July 2009, the Swedish Foreign Minister Carl Bildt insisted that dialogue was the only solution to the Iranian nuclear situation, saying that the European Parliament faced difficult choices when world powers restarted talks with Tehran to halt Iranian uranium enrichment in exchange for political and economic incentives.

== Economic relationship ==
Christofer Gyllenstierna, Sweden's Ambassador to Iran, said at a symposium in Tehran in 2007 that Sweden has potential markets in Iran. He also said that Iran's capabilities and possibilities have attracted the attention of Swedish businesses. He claimed that Sweden planned on increasing mutual trade cooperation with Iran. In 2003, Sweden and Iran signed a Memorandum of Understanding (MoU), in which Sweden recommended that Iran be given membership in the World Trade Organization (WTO). In return, Iran would allow Sweden to implement industrial, mining, and telecommunication projects inside the country. Since the UN Security Council and the European Union (which Sweden is part of) began imposing stricter sanctions, however, Swedish–Iranian bilateral trade has declined. Bilateral trade between the two amounted to only $500 million in 2007. Relations between Sweden and IRI have been shaky because of the arrest of Hamid Noury.

== Sports ==
On 31 March 2015, the first friendly football match was played between the Swedish national team and the Iranian national team at the Friends Arena.

== Resident diplomatic missions ==
- Iran has an embassy in Stockholm.
- Sweden has an embassy in Tehran.

== Sweden–Iran visa dispute ==
In March 2026, Sweden suspended the issuance and renewal of short-term visas for Iranian embassy staff in Stockholm following Iran's execution of an Iranian-Swedish dual national accused of espionage. Swedish officials stated that the individual did not receive a fair trial, and both Swedish and European officials rejected the charges. Foreign Minister Maria Malmer Stenergard described the measure as an initial step, with further actions under consideration, and stated "the death penalty is an inhumane, cruel and irreversible punishment". Kaja Kallas, The EU's foreign policy chief said "the appalling human rights situation in Iran and the alarming increase in executions are intolerable and show the regime's true colours".

== See also ==
- Foreign relations of Iran
- Foreign relations of Sweden
- Iran–European Union relations
- Swedish Iranians
- Swedish intervention in Persia
- Iranian external operations
