= Detention of Johan Floderus =

2022–24 Iranian detention of a Swedish official

Johan Floderus
- Born: 10 September 1990 (age 36); Kungälv, Sweden
- Occupations: Diplomat; European Union official
- Known for: European Union diplomat; prisoner of Iran

Johan Floderus (born 10 September 1990) is a Swedish diplomat and European Union official. He first started working for the European Commission in 2019, serving as an aide to the then-incumbent European Commissioner for Home Affairs, Ylva Johansson, before joining the European External Action Service two years later.

On 4 September 2023, a New York Times report revealed that Floderus had been arrested by Iranian authorities at the international airport in Tehran in April 2022, while visiting the country on holiday, and had reportedly been detained at the Evin Prison. EU foreign policy chief Josep Borrell confirmed the news the following day.

On 10 September, Floderus's family officially started a public campaign, named #FreeJohanFloderus, in support of his liberation. On 10 December, he was officially charged with "extensive measures against the security of the country, extensive intelligence cooperation with the Zionist regime and corruption on Earth" by Iranian authorities.

On 15 June 2024, Swedish Prime Minister Ulf Kristersson publicly announced that Floderus had been released from Iranian authorities, together with his fellow prisoner, the Iranian-Swedish dual national Saeed Azizi, as part of a prisoner exchange deal that saw Iranian prosecutor Hamid Nouri who had been tried and convicted in Sweden for his role in the 1988 executions of Iranian political prisoners, return to Iran.

== Background ==
=== Detention of foreign citizens in Iranian prisons ===
Since its creation in 1979, the Government of Iran has repeatedly arrested and detained foreign people, either from European countries or the United States, to get various types of concessions from their respective institutions. The first significant instance of this series of incidents was the Iran hostage crisis, which saw fifty-two American diplomats and citizens being held hostage in the U.S. Embassy in Tehran for 444 days, from 4 November 1979, to their release on 20 January 1981.

Tensions between Iran and Western countries started rising again since 2018, following the Trump administration's decision to announce the United States withdrawal from the JCPOA, an agreement that had been originally reached in 2015 between Iran and the P5+1 (together with the European Union) to limit the Iranian nuclear program, with the country receiving relief from international nuclear-related sanctions in return for their commitments to the deal. Following the election of Joe Biden as President of the United States, negotiations between American and Iranian representatives about a new deal took place, but they all proved to be unsuccessful as of 2023. Moreover, the election of conservative leader Ebrahim Raisi as President of Iran (succeeding to moderate Hassan Rouhani) in the summer of 2021 has been cited as another factor that fueled reciprocal mistrust between his administration and Western institutions.

Between 2022 and 2023, several foreign citizens, some of whom were dual Iranian nationals, were arrested and imprisoned by Iranian authorities on reportedly spurious charges, often involving espionage allegations; this series of arrests followed a similar trend from the previous years, mainly targeting Iranians with dual nationality or foreign permanent residency who had returned to the country due to business or personal reasons. According to some analysts, who described the aforementioned detentions as "hostage diplomacy", the Iranian regime could seek to trade imprisoned foreign citizens for Iranians held in European countries or the United States, or to use them as leverage in exchange for economic compensations and other types of concessions. An example in support of this thesis is the case of Nazanin Zaghari-Ratcliffe, an Iranian-British dual citizen who was detained in Iran since 2016, and then got released in March 2022, in exchange for the UK's settling of a longstanding debt with Iran. Moreover, in August 2023, roughly one month before the first reports on the detention of Floderus surfaced, the United States had agreed to repay $6 billion in withheld Iranian oil revenues and release several Iranian prisoners in America, to free five American citizens held in Iranian prisons.

=== Iran-Sweden relations ===
In the years prior to the arrest of Floderus, relations between Iran and Sweden progressively deteriorated due to disputes and diplomatic incidents involving their respective citizens.

In April 2016, Ahmad Reza Djalali, an Iranian-Swedish doctor and researcher in disaster medicine, was arrested and charged with spying on Iran's nuclear program for Israel, accusations he denied, before being taken to the Evin Prison, where he reportedly faced repeated tortures and threats. In October 2017, Djalali was convicted of "spreading corruption on earth" and sentenced to death: multiple reports about the time of his execution have surfaced ever since.

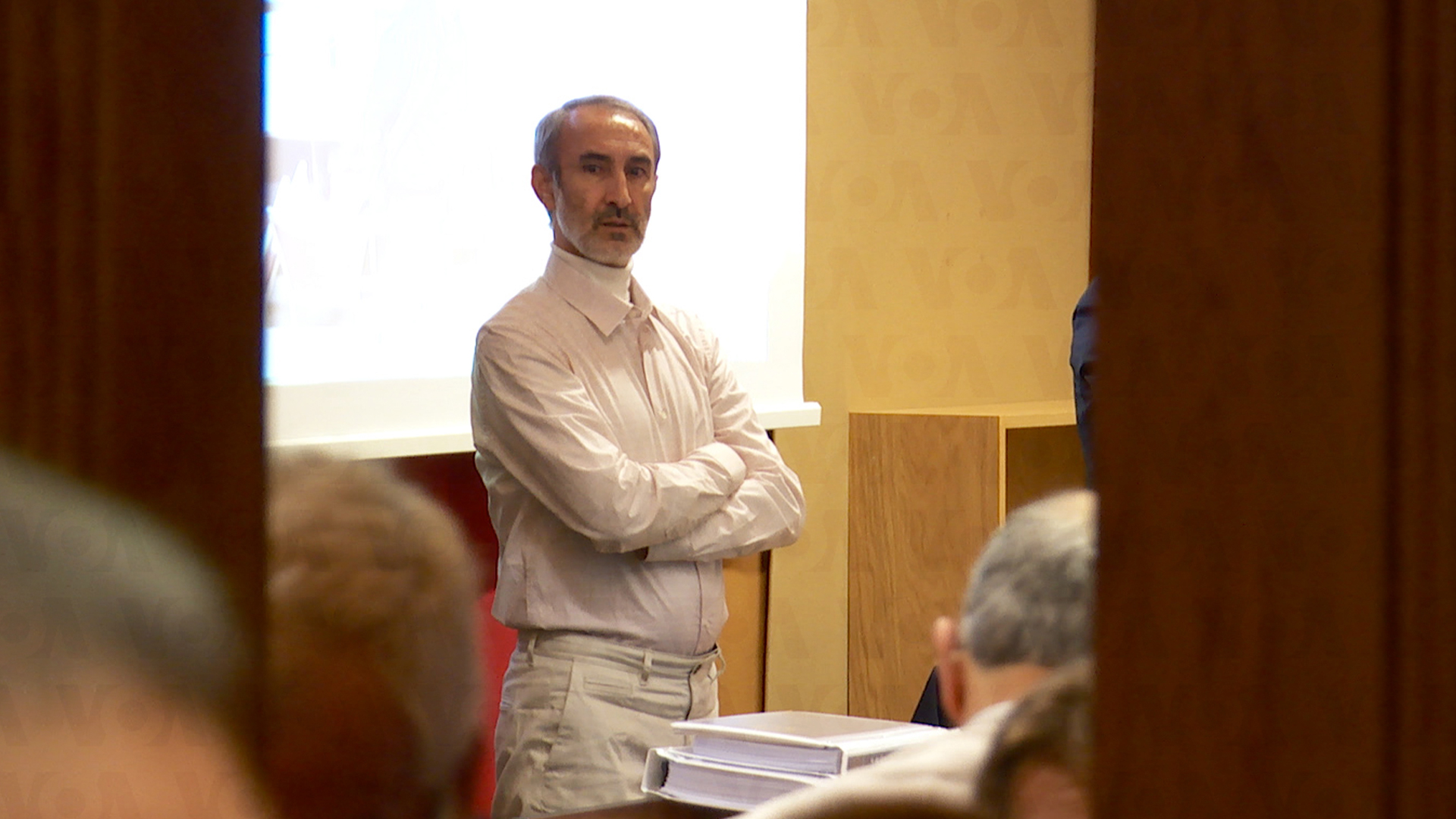
The trial of Hamid Nouri in 2019 is believed to be one of the key events that contributed to the steady deterioration of diplomatic relations between Iran and Sweden.

In November 2019, Swedish police arrested Hamid Nouri, a former senior Iranian judicial official, at the Arlanda Airport in Stockholm; he was accused of committing severe war crimes and more than 100 murders during the Iran-Iraq War, as well as the 1988 executions of Iranian political prisoners, in which future President of Iran Raisi had also been involved directly. The trial of Nouri took place under the principle of universal jurisdiction, and he was eventually found guilty of the aforementioned war crimes in July 2022, being sentenced to life in prison as a result; Nouri decided to appeal the verdict, but his request was rejected by the Svea Court of Appeal, and his life sentence was ultimately confirmed in December 2023. In the months prior to the final decision, Iranian authorities had reportedly tried to put pressure on the Swedish government to get a more favorable treatment for Nouri; moreover, as indicated by various Swedish and international media, the arrests of Swedish citizens in Iran and the threats to execute Ahmad Reza Djalali were seen as acts of retaliation for the Iranian official's trial.

Habib Chaab, an Iranian political activist who had founded and led the Arab Struggle Movement for the Liberation of Ahwaz, before going on exile to Sweden in 2006, was kidnapped in Turkey in October 2020 and smuggled to Iran; there, he was accused of masterminding the 2018 Ahvaz military parade attack, which left 25 people killed. He was sentenced to death and executed in May 2023, having been found guilty of the mofsed-e-filarz capital crime. Sweden's Minister for Foreign Affairs, Tobias Billström, together with EU, publicly condemned Chaab's execution.

== Biography ==
=== Early life and education ===
Johan Floderus was born in Kungälv, Sweden to Matts and Kerstin Floderus. He has an older sister, Ingrid.

Floderus first got interested in Iranian culture as a child, having grown fond of his neighbors, who were Iranian immigrants and whose son was Floderus' best friend at the time. While completing his military service, Floderus was accepted onto an interpreter course where he was assigned to learn the Dari dialect; following his discharge from the Armed Forces, he studied Persian for a semester in Tehran, before pursuing a PPE degree at Harris Manchester College, Oxford; he then completed his undergraduate studies at the University of Uppsala.

=== Diplomatic career in the EU ===
In 2015, he relocated to Brussels, Belgium, in order to take part in the European Union's civil service training program: he first served as a trainee at the Permanent Representation of Sweden to the EU, and then started working on development aid in 2016, as part of the European Commission's Blue Book traineeship. Later the same year, Floderus left Brussels to pursue a Master's degree in Development Economics at the SOAS University of London, before returning to the Belgian capital in September 2017, when he started working as an International Aid and Cooperation Officer at the European Commission's Directorate-General for International Partnerships. Around the same period of time, he also collaborated with the Swedish Council for Higher Education, being featured in a Facebook advertising campaign aimed to young Swedish graduates who wanted to pursue professional careers within EU institutions.

Starting in 2018, Floderus was involved in EU humanitarian missions in Iran, taking part in projects that provided health and education services to Afghan refugees in the country. In December 2019, Floderus started working for the European Commission, serving as an aide to the then-incumbent European Commissioner for Home Affairs, fellow Swedish politician Ylva Johansson; he then joined the European External Action Service (EEAS), the diplomatic corps of the EU, in September 2021, being subsequently assigned to their Afghanistan delegation. The diplomat was originally set to travel to Kabul on official EEAS duty: however, the mission was cancelled in the aftermath of the Taliban takeover in August 2021, and he continued working from the institution's headquarters in Brussels.

Prior to his arrest in April 2022, Floderus had already visited Iran at least seven times, all of which without incident; several of those visits were made on diplomatic and humanitarian business for the EU.

=== Detention in Iran ===
==== Arrest and first reports under undisclosed identity ====
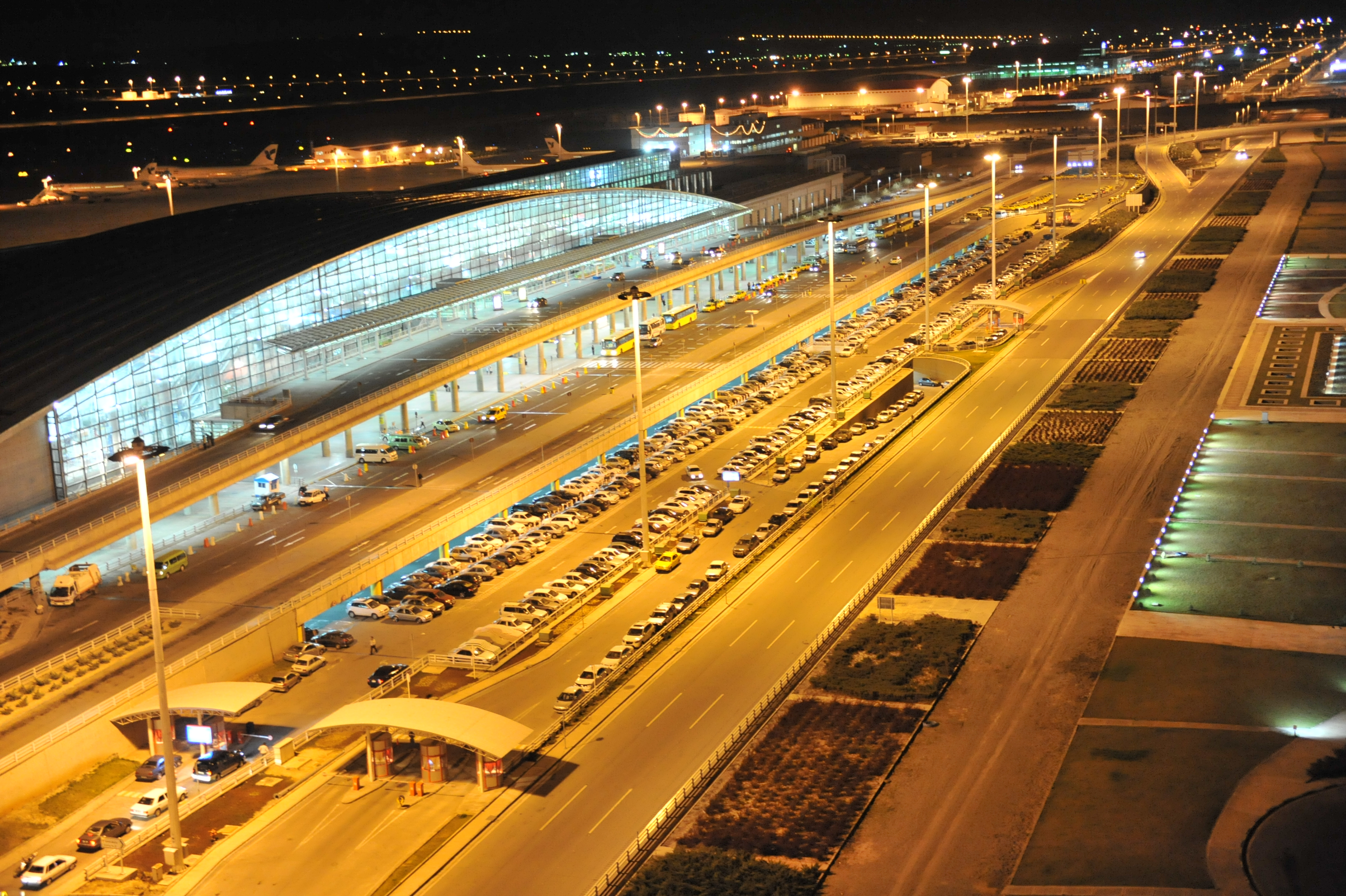
The Imam Khomeini International Airport in Tehran, where Floderus was reportedly arrested by Iranian authorities on 17 April 2022.

In April 2022, Floderus visited Iran once more, this time while on a week-long holiday, in order to visit a friend who worked at the Swedish Embassy in Tehran. On 17 April, as he prepared to leave the capital from Imam Khomeini International Airport, Floderus was arrested and reportedly taken to the Evin Prison.

About a month later, Swedish authorities announced that a Swedish man "in his thirties" had been arrested in Iran, although his identity was kept undisclosed. Aftonbladet noted that, around the same period, the national Ministry for Foreign Affairs had advised Swedish citizens to avoid non-essential travels to Iran, since an increasing number of cases had been registered within the country where "numerous European citizens [had] been deprived of [their] freedom without any apparent reason". The following month, the Swedish government advised its citizens against travelling to Iran.

In July 2022, the Iranian government released an official statement confirming the arrest of a Swedish national on espionage charges. According to the Iranian Ministry of Information, the apprehended person had already visited the country multiple times, and was "under constant monitoring from [national] intelligence agencies". In the same report, the Ministry accused the detainee of being in contact with other foreign and Iranian citizens who had previously been suspected of spying, as well as visiting Israel before their travel to Iran.

In May 2023, Swedish TV channel TV4 broadcast a three-part episode of investigative documentary series Kalla fakta, which revealed that a high-ranking, Swedish civil servant working for an international organization had been detained in Iran, which then requested a prisoner exchange deal for Hamid Noury. In the documentary the identity of the imprisoned diplomat Johan Floderus was kept undisclosed at the request of his parents.

In June 2023, Belgian aid worker Olivier Vandecasteele, who had just been released in a prisoner swap between Belgium and Iran (following 455 days in detention for alleged spying), shared his testimony at a concert held in his honor in Brussels. During the public event, he reportedly referred to a Swedish man (who was later believed to be Floderus) he met as a cell-mate during their time at the Evin Prison, saying quote, "We became like brothers: we promised each other that we would do everything for each other and whoever came out first would help each other’s family and loved ones".

==== The New York Times report and aftermath ====
On 4 September 2023, an exclusive report on Floderus' diplomatic career and detention was published on The New York Times, making such information public for the first time since his arrest in April 2022. All of the anonymous witnesses contacted by the American newspaper denied the espionage allegations Floderus had been charged with. The diplomat's family subsequently confirmed the news through an official press statement sent to Swedish media, thanking the people who were "working hard to free [Johan]" and hoping he could "come back home immediately".

The New York Times noted that Floderus's case was peculiar due to his professional background, which made him a high-value prisoner, which could have an impact on diplomatic relations between Iran and Sweden. On the other hand, as reported by POLITICO, whilst Floderus was still affiliated with the EEAS and received unofficial support from his colleagues, the responsibility for diplomatic negotiations was delegated to Swedish consular services, since he was in Iran for personal reasons, rather than on an official visit, at the time of his arrest.

At first, both the Swedish Ministry for Foreign Affairs and the European Commission declined to reveal the identity of the Swedish citizen detained in Iran. However, the day after the original New York Times report had been published, the High Representative of the Union for Foreign Affairs and Security Policy, Josep Borrell, confirmed that the aforementioned person was Floderus himself: speaking from Cádiz, Spain, where he was attending a meeting on development, Borrell told reporters that European authorities were working "relentlessly" to free the Swedish man.

Thomas Kjems, a Danish travel vlogger who had been arrested in October 2022 during the Mahsa Amini protests, before being freed in a prisoner swap in June 2023, said he had spent eight months with Floderus at the Evin Prison in an interview for SVT, noting that the diplomat had seemed "in physically and mentally good shape" when he had last seen him.

The European Commission's decision to keep the case of Floderus secret faced criticism from some European Parliament deputies, including the chairwoman of the Parliament's Iran delegation, Cornelia Ernst, as well as Iraqi-Swedish politician Abir Al-Sahlani. Richard Ratcliffe, the husband of Nazanin Zaghari-Ratcliffe, also questioned the handling of the case by Sweden and the EU, saying that the arrest of Floderus was "a real escalation" and that "in [their] family's experience, publicity keeps hostages safe, because it limits the abuse that gets done to them."

==== Public announcement and #FreeJohanFloderus campaign ====
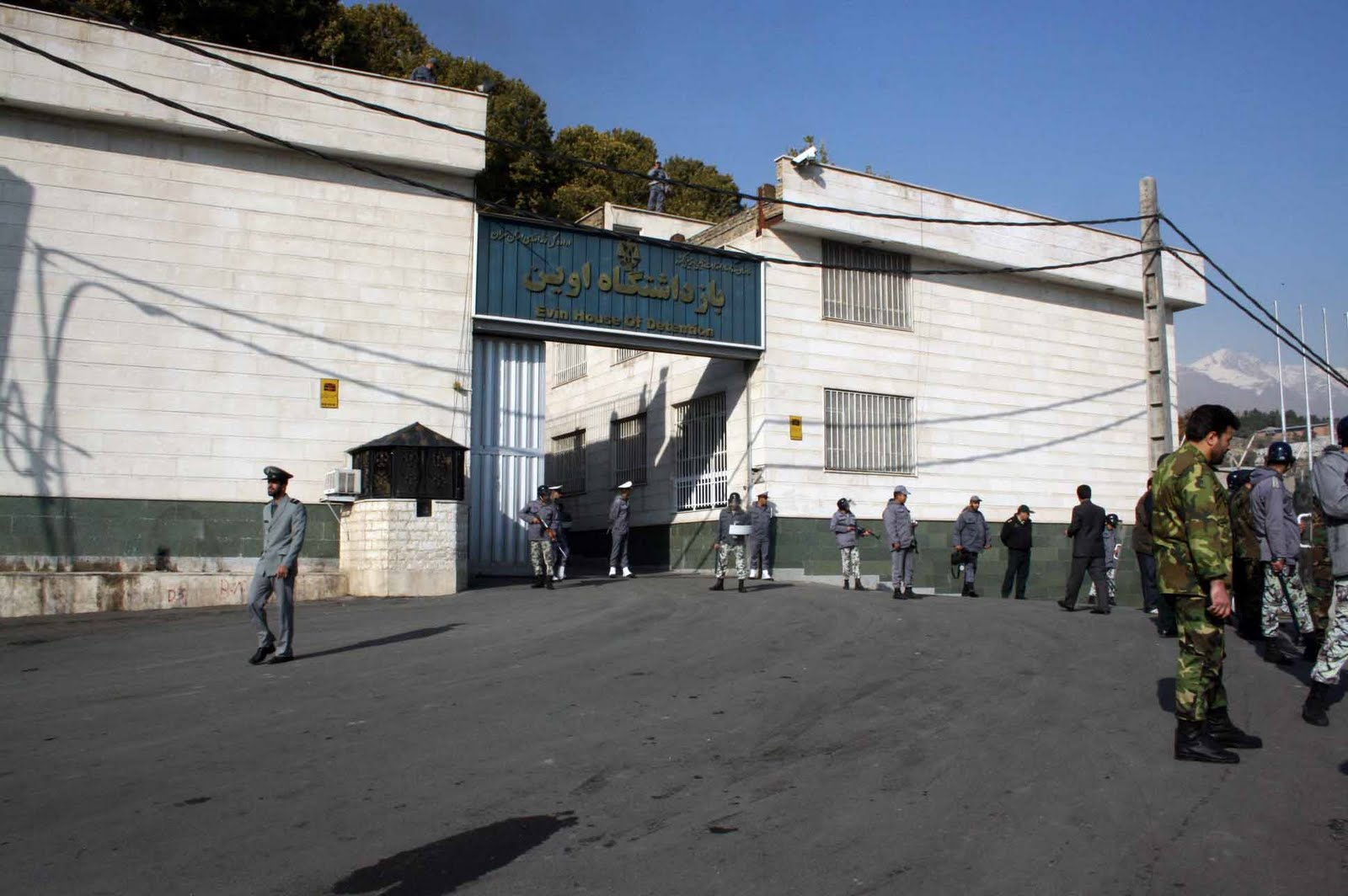
The Evin Prison in Tehran, where Floderus was detained together with other foreign hostages.

On 10 September 2023, Floderus' 33rd birthday, the diplomat's family officially launched a public campaign, named #FreeJohanFloderus, in support of his liberation from the Evin Prison.

In an official statement announcing the start of the campaign, Floderus' family revealed new details about his incarceration. According to the press release, the Swedish diplomat had been denied any kind of contact with his family during his first ten months in prison, while also receiving limited consular visits from the Swedish Embassy in Tehran. The conditions under which he was incarcerated were considered to be in violation of the United Nations' Standard Minimum Rules for the Treatment of Prisoners: reportedly, among other aspects, he had been detained in solitary confinement for over 300 days and, more generally, held in a constantly fully-lit cell; he had been denied of "basic human rights", including minimum food and medical support; he had been permitted only three-and-a-half hours of exposure to fresh air and sunlight per week; he had been significantly restricted in receiving letters and books, or sending correspondence. The family also stated that Floderus had finally been allowed to make phone calls to his family once a month since February 2023, and that he had chosen to go on hunger strike in order to raise their frequency, although the calls had to be held in English and had been subject to monitoring. On 7 August 2023, the diplomat had been granted his first video call with his family, where he had reportedly made "a desperate plea", asking to raise efforts to free him and allow him to return home.

==== Official charges and trial in Iran ====
In an interview for The Guardian in December 2023, Floderus' father, Matts, revealed that the family was set to receive updates from EU officials on a court hearing that would officially establish Iran's charges against the diplomat, stating his son was experiencing "levels of hell". Matts Floderus also said that the family initially did not speak out against Johan's detention in order to "give the other side a chance to say it was all a mistake and give them a chance to just let [him] go without losing face", while admitting that the decision to make a public denounce made "things [work] a little better".

On 10 December, Iranian news agency Mizan Online reported that Floderus had been officially accused of "extensive measures against the security of the country, extensive intelligence cooperation with the Zionist regime and corruption on Earth", with the latter crime potentially carrying a death penalty. Mizan also published several new photos of Floderus appearing before judges as the charges were read, where he could be seen wearing grey prison fatigues. The news drew further criticism from Swedish Minister for Foreign Affairs, Tobias Billström, as well as the EU's High Representative for Foreign Affairs, Josep Borrell.

On 1 February 2024, the #FreeJohanFloderus campaign organized a special event at the BOZAR in Brussels, asking for the release of the Swedish diplomat. The event was co-hosted by Floderus's sister, Ingrid, and was attended, among others, by former Iran prisoners Bernard Phelan, who had been detained in Iran from October 2022 to May 2023, and Olivier Vandecasteele, who confirmed he had shared a cell with Floderus for three weeks at the Evin Prison during his own detention. In the same period of time, posters of Floderus were hung on public buildings in his hometown of Kungälv, in support of the campaign for his liberation.

On 17 April of the same year, which marked the second anniversary of the diplomat's arrest and detention, his family, friends and colleagues hosted a 12-hour vigil at the Gare Europe in Brussels as part of the #FreeJohanFloderus campaign.

==== Release from prison ====
On 15 June 2024, Swedish Prime Minister Ulf Kristersson publicly announced that Floderus had been released from Iranian authorities, together with Iranian-Swedish dual citizen and fellow prisoner Saeed Azizi, while confirming that the two were set to return to Sweden in the following days. In his speech, Kristersson stated that Swedish and Iranian diplomatic forces had agreed on a prisoner exchange deal that included the liberation of Hamid Nouri, who was serving a life sentence in Sweden for severe war crimes and mass murder during the Iran-Iraq War. Israeli portal Walla! reported that Oman had served as a mediator in diplomatic negotiations between Sweden and Iran.

The announcement of the two men's release from prison was welcomed by several EU officials, including the European Commissioner for Home Affairs, Ylva Johansson, who Floderus had previously worked for, the President of the European Commission, Ursula von der Leyen, and the High Representative of the Union for Foreign Affairs and Security Policy, Josep Borrell.

== See also ==
- Trial of Hamid Nouri
- List of foreign nationals detained in Iran
- Human rights in Iran
- Evin Prison
- Ahmadreza Djalali
- Nazanin Zaghari-Ratcliffe
- Olivier Vandecasteele
- Hostage diplomacy
