= Olivier Vandecasteele =

Belgian aid worker

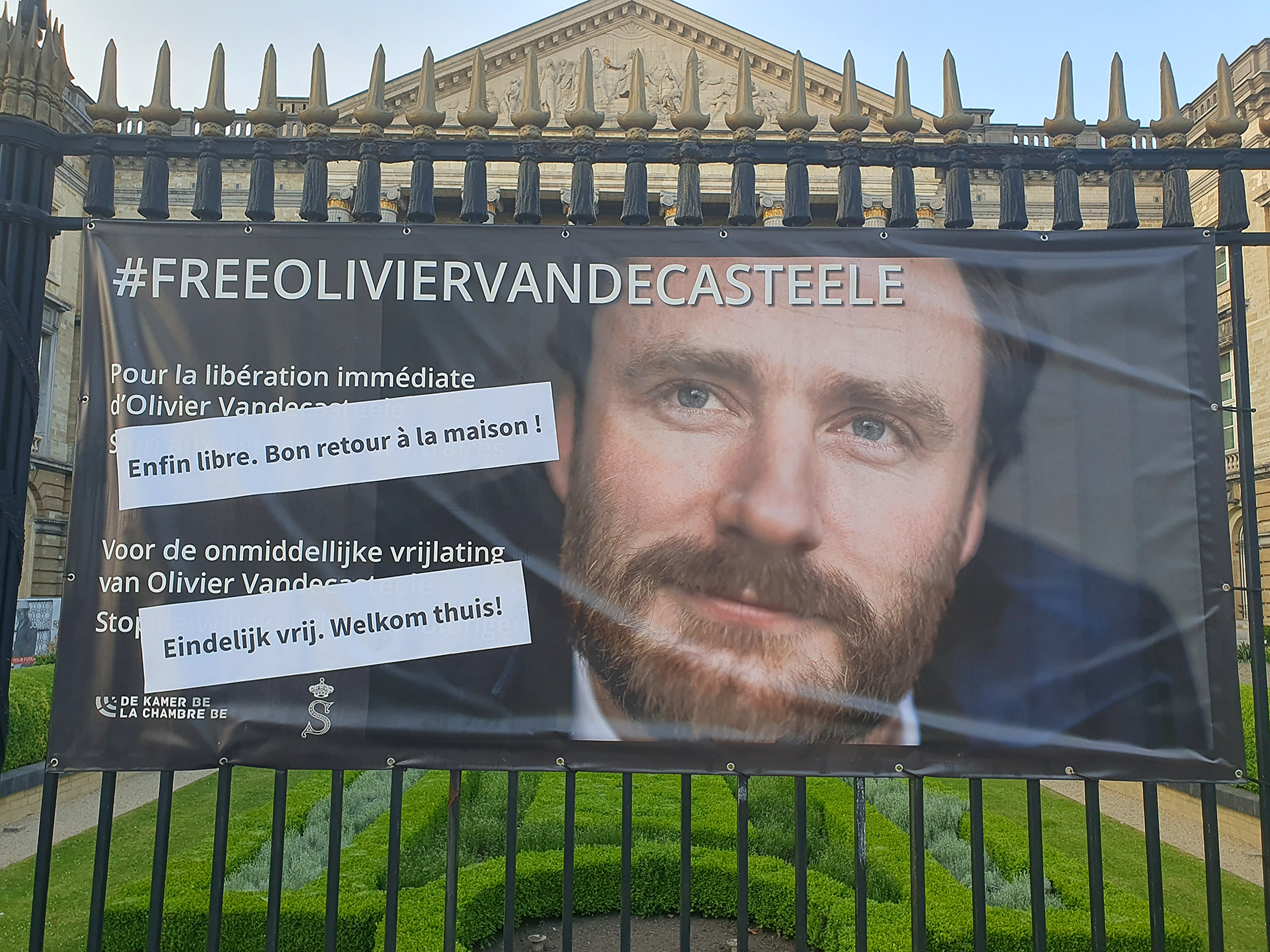
- Banner of #freeoliviviervandecasteele in Brussels (26 May 2023)
- Occupation: Humanitarian worker

Olivier Vandecasteele is a Belgian humanitarian aid worker who was arrested and taken state hostage in Iran on 24 February 2022. Following a trial, he was firstly sentenced to 28 years in December 2022, then sentenced to 40 years in prison and 74 lashes in January 2023. Victim of "Hostage Diplomacy", Vandecasteele was kept hostage "in unbearable conditions" in Iran for 456 days. He was released on 26 May 2023. His case is considered to be "a flagrant violation of international law" following the United Nations and Amnesty International.

In 2024, he founded "Protect Humanitarians", an independent and neutral NGO which aims to advocate for a better protection of humanitarian aid workers around the world.

== Career ==
Since at least 2004, Olivier Vandecasteele has worked for international humanitarian organisations, including Médecins du Monde and Norwegian Refugee Council (NRC). He has worked in India, Afghanistan, Morocco, Iran and Mali. In 2015, he became Country Director of NRC's Iran Operations where he was in charge of programs aimed to improve the living conditions of Afghan refugees (2 to 3 million). During the COVID-19 pandemic, together with his teams, he distributed widely humanitarian aid.

In 2024, Olivier Vandecasteele founded the NGO "Protect Humanitarians" which aims to advocate for a better protection of humanitarian aid workers around the world.

== Detention in Iran ==
Olivier Vandecasteele was wrongfully detained in Iran on 24 February 2022. On 5 July 2022, Belgium's justice minister Vincent Van Quickenborne claimed that Vandecasteele was being held on fabricated "espionage" charges.

In December 2022, the Belgian government stated that Iran had sentenced him to 28 years in prison, and then in January 2023, the BBC reported that he had been sentenced during a sham trial to 40 years in prison and 74 lashes for spying, money laundering, and currency smuggling. Olivier Vandecasteele denied the charges against him. "Belgium has always insisted that Vandecasteele was innocent and his trial rigged".

On 26 May 2023 it was announced that Vandecasteele had been freed following a prisoner swap with Asadollah Asadi, an Iranian ex-diplomat convicted of plotting a bomb attack against a rally of the Iranian opposition group National Council of Resistance of Iran in Paris; Asadi had been arrested in 2018 in Germany before being extradited and transferred that same year to Belgium to be prosecuted together with accomplices (Belgian nationals from Iranian origin arrested on June 30th 2018 in Belgium near the French Border and another one in Paris).

Olivier Vandecasteele was kept arbitrarily detained in very dire circumstances. Indeed he was in full isolation for 14 months, out of his 15 months of wrongful detention, in a tiny basement cell without windows and with the light constantly on 24/7. Amnesty International, the experts of the United Nations and the UN Human Rights Council's Arbitrary Detention Working stated that Vandecasteele had been subjected to enforced disappearance, torture, and other ill-treatment.

== Protect Humanitarians ==
In 2024, Olivier Vandecasteele founded the NGO "Protect Humanitarians" which aims to advocate for better protection and support of humanitarian personnel. Through a dedicated emergency fund, Protect Humanitarians provides concrete support to NGOs and their staff, survivors of attacks and/or victims’ relatives. The NGO also develops research and learning to promote best practices in staff care, mental health and legal assistance to survivors after incidents.

== The Obama Foundation ==
Olivier Vandecasteele (alongside fellow citizens Adélaide Charlier and Wietse Van Ransbeeck) is part of the 2025-2026 cohort of the "Leaders Europe" program from the Obama Foundation. Along with 200 other selectees, Olivier Vandecasteele will undergo six months of training on leadership and civic engagement (Source: De Morgen - September 18/19, 2025).

== See also ==
- Human rights in Iran
- Evin Prison
- Ahmad Reza Djalali
- Nazanin Zaghari-Ratcliffe
- Johan Floderus
- Trial of Hamid Nouri
