= Vandecasteele =

Vandecasteele is a surname. Notable people with the surname include:

- Franck Vandecasteele (born 1967), French footballer
- Olivier Vandecasteele, Belgian humanitarian
