= Embassy of Sweden, Tehran =

Sweden's diplomatic mission in Iran

- Address: Postal Address: Embassy of Sweden; P.O. Box 19575-458; Tehran, Iran; Visiting Address: No. 27 Nastaran Sr., Boostan St., Pasdaran Ave., Tehran, Iran
- Coordinates: 35.80103°N 51.47555°E
- Opened: 1936
- Ambassador: Mathias Otterstedt
- Jurisdiction: Iran
- Website: Official website

The Embassy of Sweden in Tehran is Sweden's diplomatic mission in Iran. The mission consists of an embassy, a number of Swedes sent by the Ministry of Foreign Affairs and local employees. Mathias Otterstedt has been ambassador since 2023.

== History ==
Ludvig Fabritius led three missions, in 1679–80, 1683–84, and 1697–1700, to the Safavid court during the reign of Charles XI of Sweden (r. 1660–1697) and Charles XII of Sweden (r. 1697–1718); and Suleiman of Persia (26 October 1666 – 29 July 1694 ), Sultan Husayn (29 July 1694 – 11 September 1722). In 1929 the governments of the Arvid Lindman and Reza Shah (Persia) established diplomatic relations in connection with the conclusion of a friendship treaty. In September 1957, an agreement was reached between the Swedish and Iranian governments on the mutual elevation of the respective countries' legations to embassies. In connection with this, the envoy there, Ragnvald Bagge, was appointed Sweden's ambassador in Tehran.

== Staff ==
Sweden's embassy in Tehran has around 40 employees.

== British Interest Office ==
Sweden acts as a protecting power for the United Kingdom in Iran, and on July 15, 2012, the British Interest Office was opened at the Swedish embassy. Sweden has previously been a protective force for Britain in Iran during the 1980s and until 1990.

== Building ==
The property that houses the Swedish embassy in Tehran has been owned by the National Property Board of Sweden (SFV) since 1997. It was changed by SFV to an undeveloped site owned by the Swedish state since 1963. Since 1994, the Ministry of Foreign Affairs had its embassy housed in the building and considered the house to be good and appropriate for embassy activities. The building was initially a multi-family house with five apartments. It consists of two floors and basement with garage, boiler room and storage room. An exercise room, sauna and pool were previously found in the basement floor. It is built as a pillar deck structure with Girders and pillars in concrete and the facades are clad with light yellow brick. The garden is walled with natural stone walkways and stairs, fountains and plantings. At the takeover in 1997, the installations were of a very low standard.

The house was built in 1979 in accordance with the then building rules and was inadequate in terms of safety against earthquake loads. Technical studies of the building's design and durability were carried out by SFV in consultation with the Ministry of Foreign Affairs, which showed that it did not meet the minimum requirements according to Iranian earthquake safety. Earthquake reinforcement measures were undertaken by SFV with local earthquake expertise and Swedish designers. In conjunction with the reinforcement work, a thorough rebuilding of the regular embassy office was carried out to cope with the many visa cases and issues of biometric passports. Maintenance efforts were also made with regard to surface layers and installations. The rebuilding started in February 2007 and on 1 August 2007 the embassy moved into the newly renovated and earthquake-protected premises. In November 2007, the embassy was reopened.

== See also ==
- Iran–Sweden relations
- Embassy of Iran, Stockholm
