= Embassy of Iran, Stockholm =

Diplomatic mission

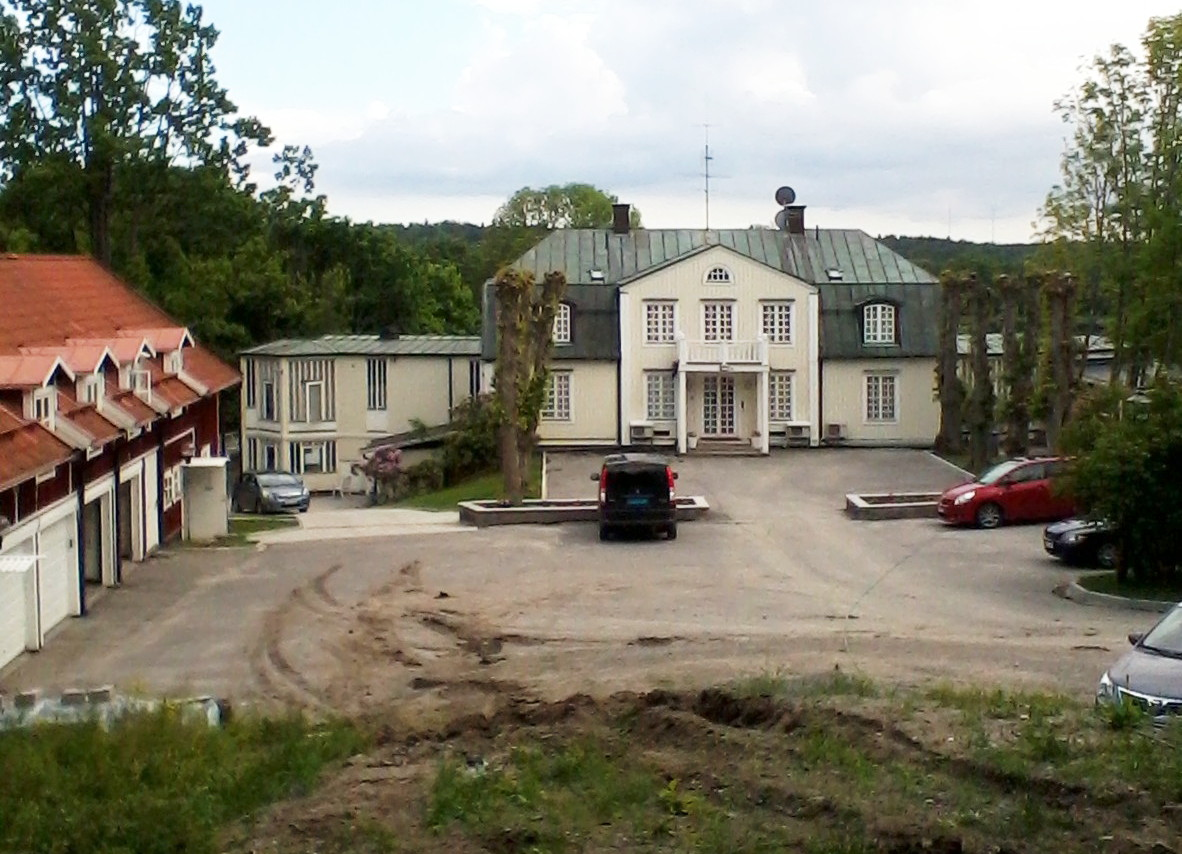
Iran's embassy in Stockholm, Sweden in 2012.

The Embassy of Iran in Stockholm is Iran's diplomatic mission to Sweden. It is located at Elfviksvägen 76, Västra Yttringe gård, on Lidingö. Until 1971, the embassy was located in the Villa Gumælius mansion in Diplomatstaden, Stockholm. The current ambassador of Iran to Sweden is Ahmad Masoumifar.

Formal diplomatic relations between Sweden and Iran were established in 1929 when a treaty of friendship was signed between the two countries.

== Protests at the embassy ==
On 24 August 1981, a group of thirty-three Iranian exile students stormed into and occupied the embassy in protest of extrajudicial executions and violence in Iran. Earlier during the summer, under the rule of Mohammad-Ali Rajai, about 700 extrajudicial executions had been carried out in Iran. Later the same day, Swedish police forces stormed the building to release the then ambassador of Iran to Sweden, Abdel Rahmin Gahavi, his wife, and a servant who had been taken hostage. The protestors were arrested and taken to the Kronoberg Remand Prison in Stockholm, where twenty-nine of them were later detained in custody pending trial.

On 26 June 2009, in the wake of the 2009 Iranian election protests, about 150 people gathered outside the embassy to protest against the Iranian regime. Some of the protesters managed to enter the embassy building, where they engaged in fighting with the embassy's personnel. According to the police, one member of the embassy staff was injured in the clashes. A few of the other protesters and a policeman were also injured. The police evicted the demonstrators, arresting one.

== See also ==
- Embassy of Sweden, Tehran
- Iran–Sweden relations
- Diplomatic missions of Iran
