= Ludvig Fabritius =

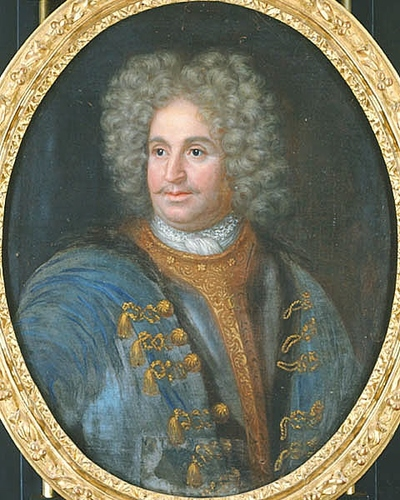
- Portrait of Fabritius by Martin Mijtens

Swedish ambassador to the Safavid Empire
- Monarchs: Charles XI and Charles XII

Personal details
- Born: Lodewyck Fabritius; 14 September 1649 Dutch Brazil
- Died: 6 October 1729 (aged 80) Stockholm, Sweden
- Occupation: Diplomat, soldier

Ludvig (Lodewyck) Fabritius (14 September 1648, – 6 October 1729) was the Swedish ambassador to Safavid Iran during the reign of King Charles XI (r. 1660–1697) and Charles XII (r. 1697–1718). After an early career in the Russian army, he became a diplomat representing the Swedish crown. Fabritius led three missions to the Safavid court: in 1679–1680, 1683–1684, and 1697–1700. His efforts were characterized by the desire to establish a new transit route between Sweden and Iran through Russia (with Narva as its hub), and several attempts to establish a fruitful alliance against the common enemy: the Ottoman Empire. Fabritius presented an invitation to the Safavid king from the Swedish king to join the Holy League, and was involved in the establishment of several Safavid-Swedish economic and trade agreements.

== Life ==
Fabriutius was born Lodewyck Fabritius in Dutch Brazil of Dutch parents. He moved to the Tsardom of Russia in 1660–1661 with his grandfather, and pursued a career in the Russian army as an officer. Fabritius participated in a number of military campaigns under the Russian banner until he was captured while fighting Stenka Razin and his Cossack forces. After spending three months in captivity in Astrakhan, enslaved by Tatars, he regained his freedom and moved to the Safavid Empire with other Dutch refugees. When Fabritius arrived in Isfahan (the Safavid capital) he turned down a position in the Dutch East India Company, and moved back to Russia in 1672. Five years later, he resigned from the Russian military service and moved to Sweden.

Fabritius' diplomatic career began in the late 1670s, and his first mission (to Iran) was to facilitate the opening of a transit route to Europe via Russia. In 1667, the tsar had given Iranian Armenians the right to maintain their trade network through this route. Six years later, a modified version of the privilege contributed to notable commerce between the Russian cities of Moscow and Arkhangelsk. Sweden then planned to connect the Russian trade route to the Baltic one, with Narva as the hub. Swedish King Charles XI decided to send a new diplomatic mission to the Safavids in 1679 and chose Fabritius to lead it, providing him with letters of credence. Fabritius paid for the mission out of his own pocket and made arrangements with Armenian merchants who sought to export goods to the Baltic.

Due to the "reticence of the Persian sources, scant references in western sources, and the absence of a regular correspondence on the part of Fabritius", it is difficult to ascertain details of the mission. According to the Encyclopedia Iranica, Fabritius may have arrived in the Safavid capital in 1680 and was given an audience the following spring. His proposals, which he presented in September 1681, included permission for Iranian merchants to enter Swedish territory; two years' exemption from tolls, and a Swedish commitment to build ships in the Caspian Sea. The Safavid king, Suleiman I of Persia (r. 1666–1694), agreed to the Swedish proposal diverting the trade route via Narva and Russia. However, the Safavid agreement added that this would be done only if the Safavid-Armenian merchants (and the other merchants in general) "would be so inclined". In the official Safavid response which Fabritius returned to Sweden, the Safavid king did not refer to concerns about trade and merely thanked the Swedish king (and his envoy) for the mission.

The Armenian merchants of the Safavid Empire were more pleased with the mission; in a letter from a Safavid Armenian to Charles XI, an Armenian merchant expressed willingness to try the Novgorod-Narva route. The mayor (or magistrate, kalāntar) of the Armenian quarter of the Safavid capital expressed interest in Caspian Swedish-Iranian shipbuilding cooperation and promised to "urge" the other Armenians to use the new route. It was eventually agreed that a delegation of silk merchants from the Armenian quarter of Julfa would accompany Fabritius on his return to Sweden, where they arrived in late 1682; after their arrival, Charles XI commissioned Fabritius to undertake a new mission.

The ambassador's second trip, which began in April 1683, is "relatively well documented". The Swedish mission arrived in the Safavid capital in March 1684, and was received by king Suleiman I in late July. Astrological advice given to the king and (perhaps) the Safavid court to await the results of negotiations with the Dutch, with whom the Safavids were "embroiled" in armed conflict, forced Fabritius to wait to present his letters to the Safavid king until September. New commercial proposals were made, and, more importantly, a Swedish proposal for Safavid Iran to join the European-led anti-Ottoman alliance known as the Holy League. The discussion during Fabritius' private audience with the Safavid king and the writings of Engelbert Kaempfer, secretary to the mission, present different versions of Charles XI's readiness to send troops to assist Iran in its struggle against the Ottomans. The Safavid king eventually declined the invitation to join the Holy League, based upon his "pacifist inclination" and a realistic assessment of his army's strength compared with the Ottomans'. Over the next three years Fabritius was received eleven times by the Safavid monarch, who assured him that he would oblige the Swedish king in all his wishes and proposals except "to resume hostilities with the Ottomans". The mission led to the opening of the Narva route, which (due to logistical facilities and preferential tolls) was a serious competitor of the Arkhangelsk route by the late 1680s.

During the 1690s, Armenian merchants made efforts to open a trade route through the Polish–Lithuanian Commonwealth and Kurland. This caused the Swedish king to send Fabritius on his third mission, "designed to publicize the advantages of the Narva connection". Information about this third (and final) mission, is scarce. The mission left Stockholm in May 1697 for Moscow (from where it departed on 28 September of that year), arriving on 8 November 1698 at the Safavid capital of Isfahan. Fabritius' requests at the Safavid court included obtaining the same rights for Swedish merchants in the Safavid Empire as Safavid merchants had in Swedish territory, lower tolls, and a hostel for Swedish merchants "similar to the one that accommodated Armenians in Narva". Fabritius also asked the Safavid king, Sultan Husayn (r. 1694–1722), to request free transit rights for Swedish merchants travelling to and from Sweden from Russian Tsar Ivan V (r. 1682–1696). Since Charles XI had died shortly before Fabritius' departure, Fabritius also informed the Safavid king about the new Swedish king: Charles XII. He also obtained an agreement that the Safavid Iranians would send a delegation to Sweden. In spring 1699 Fabritius left for Sweden with Saru Khan Beg, the new Safavid ambassador to Sweden, and they arrived on 26 May 1700. Relations between Russia and Sweden had deteriorated by that time, which led to the outbreak of the Great Northern War. The war "effectively" ended the possibility of a trade link between Safavid Iran and Sweden through Russian territory. Fabritius died on 6 October 1729 in Stockholm.

== Sources ==
- Birnbaum, Henrik; Eekman, Thomas; McLean, Hugh (1992). California Slavic Studies, Volume 14. University of California Press. pp. 58, 61. ISBN 978-0520070257.
- Herzig, Edmund; Floor, Willem, eds. (2012). Iran and the World in the Safavid Age. I.B.Tauris. pp. 8, 255. ISBN 978-1850439301.
- Matthee, Rudi (1999a). "FABRITIUS, LUDVIG". Encyclopaedia Iranica, Vol. IX, Fasc. 2. pp. 138–140.
- Matthee, Rudolph P. (1999b). The Politics of Trade in Safavid Iran: Silk for Silver, 1600-1730. Cambridge: Cambridge University Press. ISBN 978-0521641319.
- Rothman, E. Nathalie (2015). Brokering Empire: Trans-Imperial Subjects between Venice and Istanbul. Cornell University Press. ISBN 978-0801463129.
- Hoffstedt, Ragnar (1943). Sveriges utrikespolitik under krigsåren: 1675-1679 [Foreign policy of Sweden during the years of war: 1675-1679]. Uppsala: Almqvist & Wiksell. OCLC 1234413668.
