= Trial of Hamid Nouri =

Trial of Iranian official for war crimes

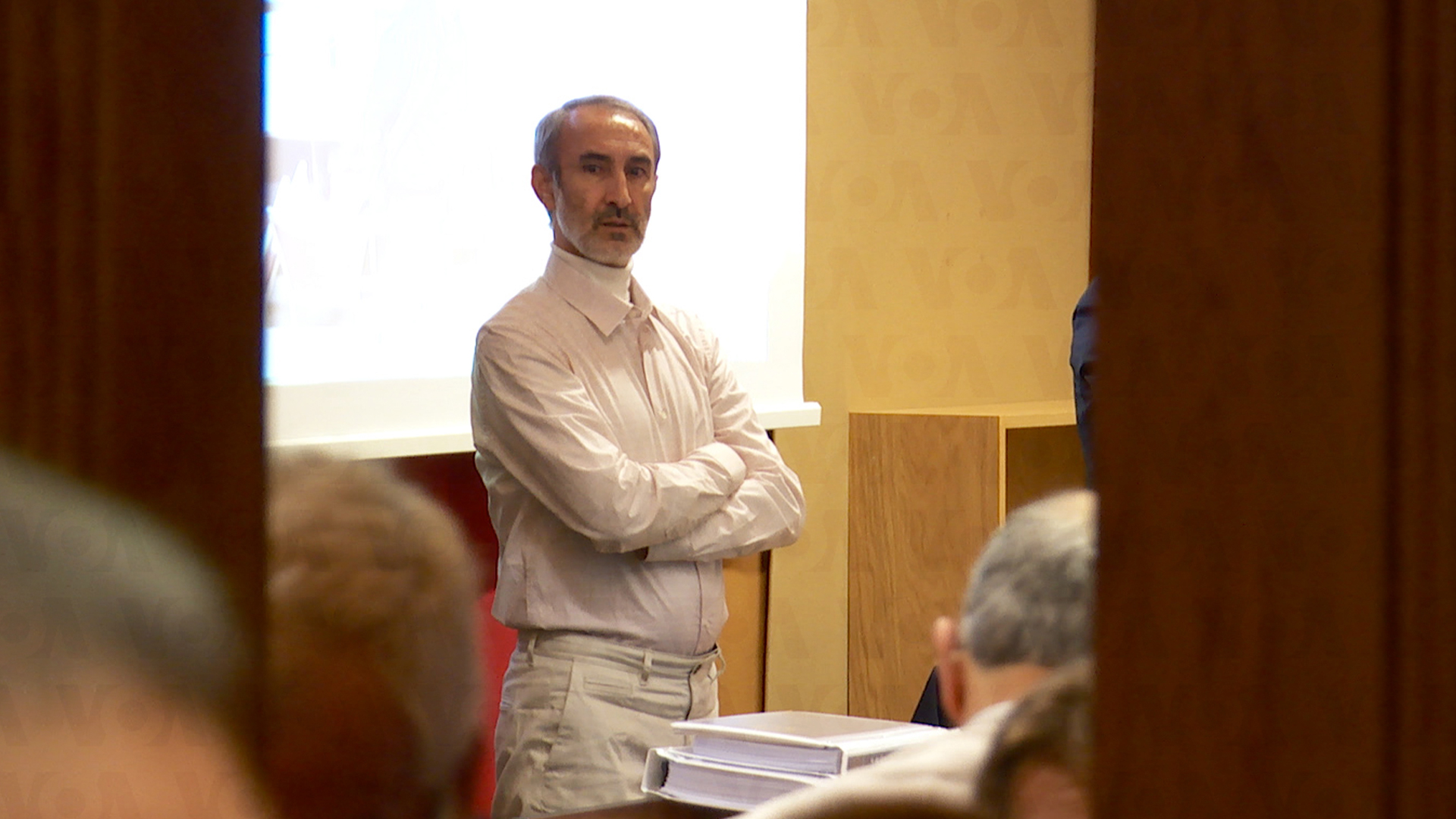
- Nouri at trial in Sweden
- Court: Stockholm District Court
- Started: August 2021
- Decided: May 2022
- Verdict: Life in prison

Demonstration in front of the district court in Stockholm August 11, 2021.

The trial of Hamid Nouri, an Islamic republic official detained in 2019 in Sweden, took place in 2022. Nouri was found guilty of being a key figure in the 1988 executions of Iranian political prisoners, where according to different estimates between 2,800 and 30,000 Iranians were massacred.

In early 2021 charges of murder and war crimes were filed against Hamid Nouri, a former Iranian prosecutor, where Nouri was accused of "torture and inhuman treatment." The trial constituted the first time someone has been charged in relation to the 1988 massacre of political prisoners. Nouri was charged with more than 100 murders and "a serious crime against international law", and was expected to provide evidence implicating Ebrahim Raisi, president of Iran, at the time of the trial.

Nouri was sentenced to life in prison and expulsion with a permanent bar from re-entering Sweden, and ordered to pay damages amounting to 1,2 million SEK. Following an appeal, the Svea Court of Appeal officially upheld Nouri's life sentence in December 2023; Ebrahim Raisi was also involved in the case as a member of the "Death Commissions in Tehran". Iran and Sweden carried out a prisoner swap on 15 June 2024 and Nouri was exchanged for a European Union diplomat Johan Floderus and another man named Saeed Azizi, in a case of hostage diplomacy.

== Background ==
Hamid Nouri, born on 29 April 1961, was known as Hamid Abbasi among political inmates. He was an IRGC jail guard recruited by the Iranian Judiciary. He assisted prosecutors in Evin and Gohardasht Prison and worked closely with Mohammad Moghiseh, the prison's associate prosecutor, and was also a member of the Gohardasht Prison Death Commission in 1988. The 1988 killings targeted members of People's Mujahedin of Iran (MEK), a group which collaborated with Saddam Hussein's invasion of Iran in an effort to overthrow the leadership of the Islamic Republic of Iran. In 2016, an audio recording was posted online of a high-level official meeting that took place in August 1988 between Hossein Ali Montazeri and the officials responsible for the mass killings in Tehran. In the recording, Hossein Ali Montazeri is heard saying that the ministry of intelligence used the MeK's armed incursion in 1988 as a pretext to carry out the mass killings, which "had been under consideration for several years".

The 1988 executions resulted from a fatwa ordered by Ayatollah Khomeini. The fatwa ordered the execution of all the Iranian prisoners that supported and were loyal to the MEK.

An audio file by former Deputy Supreme Leader, Ayatollah Hussein-Ali Montazeri, emerged in 2016 where Montazeri is heard telling Hossein Ali Nayeri, Morteza Eshraghi, Ebrahim Raisi, and Mostafa Pourmohammadi that "the biggest crime in the Islamic Republic, for which the history will condemn us, has been committed at your hands, and they'll write your names as criminals in the history." In 2018, the UN stated that the 1988 massacre was a "crime against humanity".

=== Arrest ===
On 9 November 2019, Swedish police arrested Nouri at Arlanda Airport. Swedish police had been alerted to Nouri's imminent arrival after a tip-off from his former son-in-law, Hirossch Sadeghi. Sadeghi, after unsuccessfully trying to alert two journalists at the BBC Persian and VOA Farsi, found Iraj Mesdaghi, a survivor of the executions. In the presence of Sadeghi, Mesdaghi telephoned Kaveh Moussavi, an Oxford-based human rights lawyer in the UK. Moussavi immediately mobilised a legal team with colleagues Rebecca Mooney and Matthew Jury. They interviewed several witnesses, and drafted documents setting out the factual and legal basis on which Nouri was suspected of committing grave crimes during the 1988 prison massacres in Iran. Moussavi, Mooney and Jury, with Swedish state attorney Göran Hjalmarsson, submitted the documents and evidence to Sweden's War Crimes Police on 4 November 2019, alerting them to Nouri's imminent arrival and urging the authorities to arrest, investigate and prosecute Nouri for crimes against international law. Nouri was arrested under the laws of universal jurisdiction, in which a national court can prosecute anyone for atrocities, regardless of where they were committed.

== Investigation ==
An investigation organised by the Borumand Foundation conducted by the UK leading Counsel Geoffrey Roberston QC had earlier concluded that egregious violations of international human rights laws had been carried out by the regime in Iran in the aftermath of the Death Fatwa issued by Ayatollah Khomeini ordering the killing of political prisoners who had remained "steadfast" in their views. In 2016, an investigation committee examining the 1988 massacre and individuals implicated was proposed by Maryam Rajavi. This committee looked at Moghisei, Lashgari, and Nouri. These efforts seek a trial for all government officials involved in the 1988 massacre, including Supreme Leader Ali Khamenei, President Ebrahim Raisi, and Supreme Court Chief Mohseni-Ejei. On 3 May 2021, 152 former UN officials, Nobel laureates, former leaders of state, and human rights experts called for an international investigation.

== Trial ==
Nouri was first detained in 2019. He was an assistant public prosecutor who reportedly took on an important role in the execution of Iranian political prisoners in 1988. Nouri was accused of providing names to prosecutors, giving death sentences, and taking prisoners to execution chambers.

Prosecutors in Stockholm district court introduced charges against Hamid Nouri, including murder and a serious crime against international law. He was allegedly assistant to the deputy prosecutor of Gohardasht Prison in Karaj, outside Tehran, between July 30 and August 16, 1988. Nouri was also accused of "torture, execution, and secret burial of the victims and not letting their families know about their burial place."

Nouri's lawyer, Daniel Marcus, said he would counter all claims during the trial. The three-day trial had been expected to take place in April 2022. Swedish prosecutors asked for the maximum sentence, life imprisonment.

The trial started in August 2021 in Stockholm District Court and lasted for 92 days, ending May 2022.

=== Verdict ===
On 14 July 2022, Nouri was sentenced to life in prison and expulsion with a permanent bar from re-entering Sweden, and ordered to pay damages amounting to 1.2 million SEK.

In Swedish law, a person sentenced to life imprisonment may apply to have the sentence commuted to a fixed-term sentence after having served at least ten years of the sentence. If the sentence is commuted, the fixed-term sentence shall not be less than the maximum term of imprisonment that may be imposed for the crime, which for murder and a serious a crime against international law is 18 years. If released, Nouri would be expelled from the country.

Nouri appealed the verdict, and the appeal court proceedings began on January 11, 2023. However, his request was rejected by the Svea Court of Appeal in December of the same year, and his life sentence was subsequently confirmed.

=== Statements from civil plaintiffs lawyer ===
Lawyer Kenneth Lewis said that the sentence of execution of political prisoners was issued to members and supporters of the MEK and suggested that Khomeini had likely issued the sentence as a result of MEK operations before Operation Forough Javidan. According to Lewis, the Islamic Revolutionary Guard Corps had engaged in armed clashes against the MEK dressed in Kurdish uniforms to show that the MEK were fighting against pro-Iranian Kurds together with Iraq. Lewis then said that reporters in attendance during these clashes did not document the presence of any Iraqi forces, and that by the end of the war the MEK had contacted the Red Cross with the aim of freeing 1,500 captured war prisoners back to Iran.

== Response by Tehran ==
The government in Iran "expressed outrage" over the trial, calling it "completely illegal" and "politically motivated". Iran's Intelligence Minister Esmaeil Khatib said that Ahmad Reza Djalali's "espionage for the Zionist regime has been proven and his death sentence has gone through all judicial stages. The Swedish government, on behalf of the Zionist regime and the United States, illegally detained our citizen Mr. Hamid Nouri in Sweden shortly after his arrest and trial, and took him hostage."

== International response ==
The Swedish newspaper Aftonbladet said that the recent arrests of Swedes in Iran and the death sentence of Ahmad Reza Djalali were a "warning" in retaliation for Nouri's trial.

Human right groups said that the Government of the Islamic Republic of Iran has a pattern of hostage diplomacy where dual or foreign nationals are "detained on trumped-up charges of espionage and then leveraged politically to release frozen funds, or to be exchanged for Iranian citizens incarcerated in other countries."

== Temporary relocation to Albania ==
The trial relocated to Durrës, Albania for two weeks in order to facilitate testimonies from People's Mujahedin of Iran witnesses. The first trial session took place on 10 November.

== Testimonies ==
Testimonies were given by witnesses including members of the MEK. The trial received testimonies from victims telling of torture, mass hangings, and "brutal summary justice". Reza Falahi told AFP that he had seen Nouri while he was at "the death corridor", and "whenever they read some people's names he followed them toward the death chamber."

Mohammad Zand, who was arrested in 1981 for supporting the MEK, was the first plaintiff and witness at the court in Durrës. According to Zand, Nouri participated in taking people to be executed. Zand also said that these were "only a small part of the clerical regime's crimes". According to accusers, Nouri's duties included ushering prisoners to panels and to their executions. His arrest is considered a "significant victory" for victims of human rights violations in Iran.

== Prisoner exchange ==
In 2024, Iran and Sweden agreed to a prisoner exchange in which Hamid Noury was freed. He subsequently returned to Iran. Iran released European Union diplomat Johan Floderus and Saeed Azizi in the exchange.
