= Ahmad Reza Djalali =

Iranian-Swedish doctor, lecturer, and researcher (born 1971)

- احمدرضا جلالی
- Born: 15 September 1971 (age 54); Sarab, East Azerbaijan, Iran
- Occupations: Physician; Lecturer; Researcher
- Employer(s): Karolinska Institute; University of Eastern Piedmont; Vrije Universiteit Brussel
- Criminal charge: Espionage
- Criminal penalty: Capital punishment
- Criminal status: Awaiting execution
- Spouse: Vida Mehrannia

Ahmad Reza Djalali (Note: Persian: احمدرضا جلالی) (born 15 September 1971) is an Iranian-Swedish physician and researcher in disaster medicine. He has worked at several European universities, including the Karolinska University of Sweden, where he earned his PhD, the Università degli Studi del Piemonte Orientale, and Vrije Universiteit Brussel. He has also collaborated with universities in Iran and maintained international academic connections.

Djalali was arrested in April 2016 while visiting Iran and later sentenced to death on charges of espionage and treason. Human rights organizations have described his trial as unfair. Djalali has stated that he was tortured and threatened during his detention. His case has been described by human rights advocates as a form of retaliatory punishment linked to international legal proceedings, and possibly a case of academic hostage diplomacy.

== Academic work ==
Djalali’s academic work focuses on emergency and disaster medicine. He has conducted research in countries including Italy, Sweden, Denmark, and Iran. He was one of the key founders of the Research Center in Emergency and Disaster Medicine (CRIMEDIM) at the University of Eastern Piedmont in Italy. His studies have examined how prepared hospitals are for disasters such as earthquakes,, armed conflicts, and large-scale emergencies involving Chemical, biological, radiological, and nuclear.

His research has been widely cited and highlights the need for better staff training and planning in hospitals. One of his 2016 studies assessed how well Emergency Departments staff in Italy understood disaster protocols and found that more education and follow-up were needed.

Djalali also contributed to the development of disaster medicine training programs for both undergraduate and postgraduate medical students. In 2020, he was offered a fellowship in Disaster Medicine at the Beth Israel Deaconess Medical Center, which included a research appointment at Harvard Medical School. In the award letter, the program director described Djalali as “a strong academician and leader. As a Disaster Medicine fellow, you will represent all of us through your academic diligence, professionalism, and conduct He was also formally awarded a "Scholars at Risk" fellowship by Harvard University in recognition of his work and unjust detention.

== Arrest and imprisonment ==
In April 2016, when he was visiting Iran following an invitation from the University of Tehran and Shiraz University, he was arrested upon order of the Ministry of Intelligence and Security, without a reason for arrest. Two weeks later he was charged with espionage and collaboration with Israel, the proof being an alleged letter from his spouse, which was said to contain evidence of the accusations. His family was not informed on his whereabouts for ten days, though they knew he had been arrested. After being held at an unknown location for approximately seven days, he was transferred to section 209 of Evin prison, where he was held for seven months. During the calls made to his family, Djalali said he had been held in solitary confinement for three months, and the following months in partial isolation.

== Sentence and legal status ==
On 31 January 2017, after nine months of detention, Djalali was taken to branch 15 of the Revolutionary Court in Tehran where he was formally charged with espionage and was told that he could face the death penalty. Reportedly, his lawyer was not allowed to be present at the hearing and was denied access to the case files.

Djalali was sentenced to death on 21 October 2017, on the charge of “corruption on Earth” (ifsad fil-arz). He was then incarcerated at Evin prison. In November 2017, the United Nations Working Group on Arbitrary Detention formally requested the Iranian Government to provide detailed information about his detention but did not receive a response. In late 2017, on Iranian state-sponsored television, they presented him as a spy and showed an alleged confession which, according to Djalali, was a pre-written text that he was forced to read under threat of execution and threats of harming his loved ones. Attempts by his lawyer to submit appeals for judicial review of the sentence have been rejected.

In November 2020, Djalali was transferred to solitary confinement in Evin prison. On 24 November the prosecuting authority informed Amnesty International that Djalali's death sentence was a matter of weeks away. UN rights experts called on Iranian authorities to quash the death sentence of Djalali. Amnesty urged members of the international community to intervene immediately to halt the execution.

In 2022, Sweden expressed deep concern after Iranian media reported that Djalali’s execution was imminent, following the trial of former Iranian official Hamid Nouri in Sweden, which some analysts believe is linked.

As of late 2023, Djalali remained at grave risk of execution. Amnesty International warned that his sentence may be carried out at any moment and reiterated calls for his release, citing the retaliatory nature of the case in connection with geopolitical tensions.

The U.S.-based organization United Against Nuclear Iran (UANI) has listed Djalali as a prisoner of concern and highlighted his case as evidence of the Iranian government’s systematic targeting of dual nationals.

== Health condition ==
Since his arrest, Djalali’s health has significantly declined. In 2018, blood tests showed a low white blood cell count, which can signal serious medical issues. In early 2019, he was examined by a prison doctor, who recommended he see a blood specialist at a hospital, but prison officials denied the request. Subsequently, he was examined by a medical doctor in early 2019 at Evin Prison; he was recommended to be seen by a specialist in haematology in hospital, but this request was denied. The recommended follow-up examinations have not been done.

Reportedly, Djalali has lost 24 kg since the time of his arrest. The World Medical Association has taken up his case and its president, Ketan Desai, wrote to the Iranian authorities saying that the conditions under which Djalali is being held contravene medical ethics and human rights law. The World Medical Association also raised concerns about his treatment, stating that the conditions he faces violate medical ethics and international human rights standards.

== International pressure ==
=== United Nations ===
In November 2017, the United Nations Working Group on Arbitrary Detention formally requested the Iranian Government to provide detailed information about his detention and it did not receive a response. On 9 February 2018, United Nations human rights experts urgently called on Iran to lift the death sentence against Djalali.

United Nations human rights experts appealed to Iran to annul the death sentence against Djalali for the first time in 2017. The experts were José Antonio Guevara Bermúdez, Chair-Rapporteur of the Working Group on Arbitrary Detention; Nils Melzer, Special Rapporteur on torture and other cruel, inhuman or degrading treatment or punishment; Agnes Callamard, Special Rapporteur on extrajudicial, summary or arbitrary executions; and Asma Jahangir, Special Rapporteur on the situation of human rights in the Islamic Republic of Iran.

They adopted the opinion No. 92/2017. On 18 September 2017, the Working Group transmitted allegations to the Government under its regular communications procedure but did not receive a response from the Iranian Government. This document argued that the deprivation of liberty of Djalali was in contravention of articles 3, 5, 8, 9, 10 and 11 of the Universal Declaration of Human Rights and of articles 7, 9, 10 and 14 of the International Covenant on Civil and Political Rights and it states that Djalali should be released and accorded a right to compensation and other reparations, in accordance with international law. United Nations human rights experts repeated their urgent call in 2018.

In the 2020 Annual report of the United Nations High Commissioner for Human Rights and reports of the Office of the High Commissioner and the Secretary-General, it is stated that "There are persistent concerns about the situation of dual and foreign nationals who remain imprisoned in the Islamic Republic of Iran [...]. Iranian-Swedish citizen Ahmadreza Djalali, sentenced to death in October 2017 on espionage charges, was reportedly transferred on 29 July 2019 to an unknown location for approximately 10 days before being returned to Evin Prison. During that time, he was reportedly pressured to confess to further allegations. Djalali, along with other dual and foreign nationals, including Mr. Ghaderi, have been denied medical treatment, notably for life-threatening conditions."

In the Report of the Special Rapporteur on the situation of human rights in the Islamic Republic of Iran 2020, it is underlined that "the security and intelligence officials, including the Ministry of Intelligence and the Islamic Revolutionary Guard Corps, have in many cases prevented access to medical care for detainees and prisoners, or made medical attention or transfers to hospital conditional upon confession." In addition, the Special Rapporteur is concerned about the practice of publicizing forced confession: "Ahmadreza Djalali, a Swedish-Iranian academic, had his confession to spying on the Islamic Republic of Iran broadcast on State television in December 2017, five days after the Supreme Court had upheld his death sentence through a hastily convened and secret process during which no submissions from the defence had been allowed". It is reported Djalali recorded the confession under duress after his interrogators had said that he would be released from solitary confinement only if he recorded the confession.

On 6 October 2020, the UN High Commissioner for Human Rights Michelle Bachelet expressed deep concern at the deteriorating situation of human rights defenders, lawyers, and political prisoners being held in Iran's prisons. She called on the authorities to release them in the context of the COVID-19 pandemic pointing to the spread of disease in the country and unsanitary conditions within the prisons.

On 18 March 2021, UN human rights experts demanded his immediate release as his condition had become critical. The experts said “Djalali’s situation is truly horrific. He has been held in prolonged solitary confinement for over 100 days with the constant risk of his imminent execution laying over his head,” and he is being deprived of sleep by prison officials shining lights on him 24 hours a day.

=== Nobel Laureates ===
In December 2018, 121 Nobel Laureates wrote an open letter to the Iranian Supreme Leader Ayatollah Ali Khamenei to provide medical assistance for Djalali and ask for his release. In November 2020, following news of professor Djalali's imminent execution, 153 Nobel Laureates sent another letter to the Ayatollah calling for his release.

=== European Parliament ===
In 2019, the European Parliament adopted a resolution demanding that Djalali and four other EU citizens detained be released. MEPs demanded the immediate release of all EU-Iranian dual nationals, including Nazanin Zaghari-Ratcliffe (British), Ahmadreza Djalali (Swedish) and Kamran Ghaderi (Austrian), detained in Iranian prisons, unless they are retried according to international standards. On 17 December 2020 the European Parliament adopted a resolution (2020/2914(RSP)) which calls on Iran to quash his death sentence and secure his immediate release, as well as that of Nasrin Sotoudeh, woman human rights defender and lawyer.

=== Amnesty International ===
Amnesty International has been closely following and collecting the information about Djalali's living conditions and health status, especially the living conditions Djalali has experienced during his imprisonment.

In 2017, Amnesty International launched a campaign to encourage public audiences to write a petition letter and submit it to Iranian Supreme Leader Office, President of Iran, and Chief Justice of Iran (head of the Judiciary), to ask for an immediate release of Djalali, and a proper health medication, to ensure Djalali's safety, and his accessibility to lawyer and family, including the Swedish consular to meet him.

The 2020 Nowruz Action is a campaign to support prisoners of conscience in Iran on the occasion of the Iranian traditional New Year festival. Amnesty encourages public audiences to send supporting messages to the prisoners and their families. Amnesty International selected seven cases of political prisoners and academic prisoners, among which was Djalali's case, to represent the Nowruz campaign.

=== Scholars at Risk ===
Scholars at Risk (SAR) is an international network of institutions and individuals that promotes academic freedom and protects scholars from academic freedom threats. SAR has been engaging and pushing public campaigns to support Djalali, for example, by releasing letters to public authorities in Iran and conducting online activities via social networks. In January 2018, SAR published the campaign ‘#SaveAhmad’ through social media to exert pressure on public institutions to support Djalali's release. In March 2020, in response to the COVID-19 pandemic, SAR issued the letter to Iranian authorities to unconditionally release Djalali because of his health conditions.

=== Swedish academic institutions ===
Between 13 and 16 academic institutions in Sweden continued to pursue partnerships and exchange programs with Iranian counterparts after Iranian authorities had condemned Djalali to death. Simultaneously, some also pleaded for Iran to release Djalali. The institutions which pursued partnerships with Iranian institutions 2018 or later were:

- Lund University
- Chalmers University of Technology
- Linnaeus University
- Malmö University
- KTH Royal Institute of Technology
- University of Borås
- Halmstad University
- University of Gothenburg
- Mälardalen University College
- Luleå University of Technology
- Jönköping University
- Gävle University College
- University of Skövde

=== European universities ===
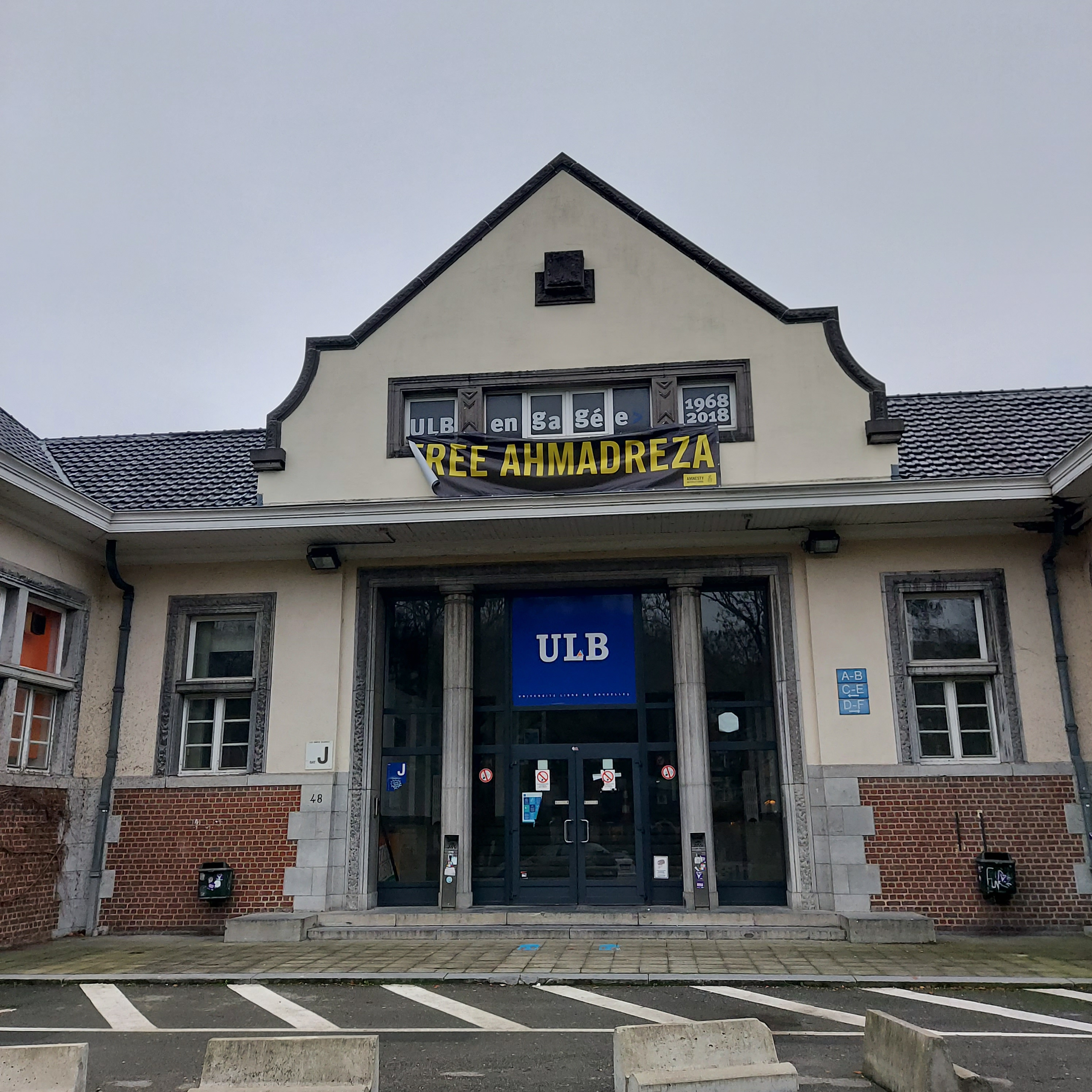
"Free Ahmadreza" banner in Brussels, by Amnesty international

On 31 October 2017, the Università degli studi del Piemonte Orientale, the Karolinska University and the Vrije Universiteit Brussel sent a letter to the head of the judiciary of Iran, Sadiq Larijani asking for Djalali's immediate release. In the letter, the universities recalled the excellent reputation of Djalali and the right to freedom of expression.

In November 2017, European University Association (EUA) put pressure on Iranian authorities for a reversal of Djalali's capital sentence and his instant release. The EUA wrote a letter to the Iranian Supreme Leader and expressed grave concerns about the ongoing harm to Djalali and his family.

In April 2018, the Flemish University Council (VLIR) decided to postpone all academic cooperation with Iranian universities and institutions in response to Iranian authorities’ decision to imprison and lay down death sentences over Djalali, a professor of the Vrije Universiteit Brussel. On this occasion, the Council expressed deep concerns about the professor's imprisonment and requested the Iranian authorities to provide him with medical care.

Following news of Djalali's imminent execution in December 2020, Scholars at Risk mobilized universities across the world to call for a halt to his execution. The Italian conference of rectors sent a petition to the Ayatollah Khamenei to secure this release.

The University of Piemonte Orientale and CRIMEDIM organized a 24-hour scientific and academic marathon on 9 December which involved more than 260 speakers from 23 countries in 5 continents and had thousands of viewers.

== Case update ==
=== 2017 ===
- A petition was started for the release of Djalali on change.org and it succeeded in obtaining more than 320.000 signatures. The petition was directed to Iranian Authorities and to the former President of the European Parliament Antonio Tajani, among others.
- On 31 October, the Università degli studi del Piemonte, the Karolinska University and the Vrije Universitet Brussel sent a letter to the Head of the judiciary of Iran, Sadiq Larijani asking for Djalali's immediate release. In the letter the universities recalled the excellent reputation of Djalali and recalled the right to the freedom of expression.
- On 13 November, the European University Association sent a letter to the Supreme Leader of the Islamic Republic of Iran, Ayatollah Ali Khamenei.
- The Human Rights Council Working Group on Arbitrary Detention (UN) adopted opinion No. 92/2017 at its eightieth session, 20–24 November. The Working Group transmitted the source's allegations to the Iranian Government and requested the Government to provide, by 17 November, detailed information about the current situation of Djalali and any comments on the source's allegations. The opinion received no feedback.

=== 2018 ===
- The Human Rights Council Working Group on Arbitrary Detention (UN) repeated their urgent call for Djalali's release.
- In February Ahmadreza Djalali was granted permanent Swedish citizenship.
- On 5 February, FIDU (Federazione Italiana Diritti Umani), Iran Human Rights, ECPM – Ensemble Contre la Peine de Mort and Nessuno tocchi Caino (Hands off Caino) sent a letter to the High Representative of the Union for Foreign Affairs and Security Policy Federica Mogherini in order to ask to take urgent action and to obtain an immediate suspension of the death sentence.
- On 3 May, the Scholars At Risk network wrote a letter to the Supreme Leader of the Islamic Republic of Iran, Ayatollah Ali Khamenei.

=== 2019 ===
- On 24 January the Committee of Concerned Scientists (ССS), an independent organization of scientists, physicians, engineers and scholars, wrote to The Acting Minister of Health and Medical Education in Iran, Dr. Saeed Namaki. The letter requested that Djalali be taken to a community hospital for appropriate care. On 17 March 2020, ССS also suggested freeing Djalali to aid in the COVID-19 pandemic. Addressing the Supreme Leader of Iran, Ayatollah Ali Khamenei, CSS stated: “Iran could greatly benefit from utilizing the expertise of Dr. Ahmadreza Djalali who is an internationally recognized leader in the area of disaster medicine. His contribution to the fight against the pandemic would be invaluable for your country.” In February 2021 ССS also requested President Biden arrange the release of Djalali and vacate his sentence.
- On 9 September Prof Dr Peter-André Alt, President of the German Rectors’ Conference (HRK) wrote an open letter reiterating his call for the immediate release of Djalali. Alt stated: “The death sentence and relentless cruel treatment of Dr Djalali constitute a terrible violation of human rights and academic freedom. The global scientific community cannot tolerate the actions of the Iranian Government.”

=== 2020 ===
- After the widespread of the COVID-19 pandemic, in March 2020, Iranian authorities released 85,000 individuals from prisons, including political prisoners. Djalali was not among this number.
- In June Stefania Pucciarelli, Senator of the Italian Republic and President of the Human Rights Commission of Palazzo Madama, wrote a letter to the ambassador of Iran for an update on Djalali.
- In June a guest editorial written by Physician Frederick M. Burkle and featured in the World Association for Disaster and Emergency Medicine's June issue of Prehospital and Disaster Medicine discusses Djalali's case and urges for his immediate release. Burkle stated, “Whatever political advantage Iran thought they might gain by his incarceration has had the opposite effect to what was intended. Upon his death, academic institutions worldwide, that support the over 70,000 Iranian graduate students and scholars studying abroad each year, will be increasingly reluctant to participate for fear those graduates will suffer a similar fate once they return.”
- In September, an interview from prison was released where Ahmadreza Djalali calls on the Swedish government to intervene to help free him.
- 10 October was the World Day against the Death Penalty and Amnesty and other organizations tweeted calls to save Djalali.
- In October 2020, UN High Commissioner for Human Rights Michelle Bachelet expressed deep concern at the deteriorating situation of human rights defenders, lawyers, and political prisoners being held in Iran's prisons.
- On 24 November, it was widely reported that Djalali had been transferred to solitary confinement and had been told by the authorities that his death sentence would soon be carried out.
- On Tuesday, 1 December the organization Iran Human Rights reported hearing from Vida Mehrannia, Djalali's wife, that he was going to be transferred to Rajai Shahr prison, a normal preliminary to an execution. This was just a few days after the release of the Australian scholar Kylie Moore-Gilbert.
- On Wednesday, 2 December, Djalali was granted a temporary reprieve and was not transferred to Rajai Shahr prison, as reported by The Guardian.

=== 2021 ===
- On 1 March 2021, a group of civil rights activists appeared before the Judiciary Services Office in Tehran to file a suit against those who order or enforce solitary confinement in Iran's detention centres and prisons, bringing to the fore public discussion in Iran of a longstanding practice that the UN has labelled torture.
- On 18 March 2021, UN human rights experts demanded the immediate release of Djalali due to his critical condition after over 100 days in solitary confinement, a form of punishment used systematically by the Islamic Republic of Iran despite being a violation of Iran's obligations under the International Covenant on Civil and Political Rights.

=== 2022 ===
- The Iranian Students News Agency reports that Djalali will be executed on 21 May "at the latest". Tehran has denied any links between the Trial of Hamid Nouri and Ahmad Reza Djalali's death sentence.
- According to research by Amnesty International, since Asadollah Asadi's trial in Belgium, Ahmadreza Djalali's situation has become a "hostage-taking".
- On 21 May 2022, Djalali's attorney Helaleh Moussavian told AFP that his defence team had requested a retrial from the judicial authority.
- Iran’s Intelligence Minister Esmaeil Khatib said that Djalali's "espionage for the Zionist regime has been proven and his death sentence has gone through all judicial stages."
- In June 2022, Private Eye explained that Iran appeared to be holding Djalali as a hostage in a vain attempt to secure the release of Hamid Nouri, a former prosecutor in Iran accused of involvement in 5,000 political executions in the 1980s.

=== 2023 ===
- On 22 December 2023 Amnesty International published an update stating that Ahmadreza Djalali is at grave risk of retaliatory execution.

=== 2024 ===
- In June 2024, Iran and Sweden executed a prisoner swap where Tehran released EU diplomat Johan Floderus and another Swedish citizen, Saeed Azizi, in exchange for Hamid Nouri, an Iranian convicted of war crimes related to the 1988 mass executions in Iran. Djalali was notably excluded from this exchange.
- Swedish Foreign Minister Tobias Billström responded, stating that Sweden had not given up on Djalali and would continue efforts to have him freed, despite Iran's refusal to recognize him as a Swedish citizen.

== See also ==
- Niloufar Bayani
- Scholars at Risk
- List of foreign nationals detained in Iran
