= Seyed Mostafa Azmayesh =

French-Iranian jurist and scholar (born 1952)

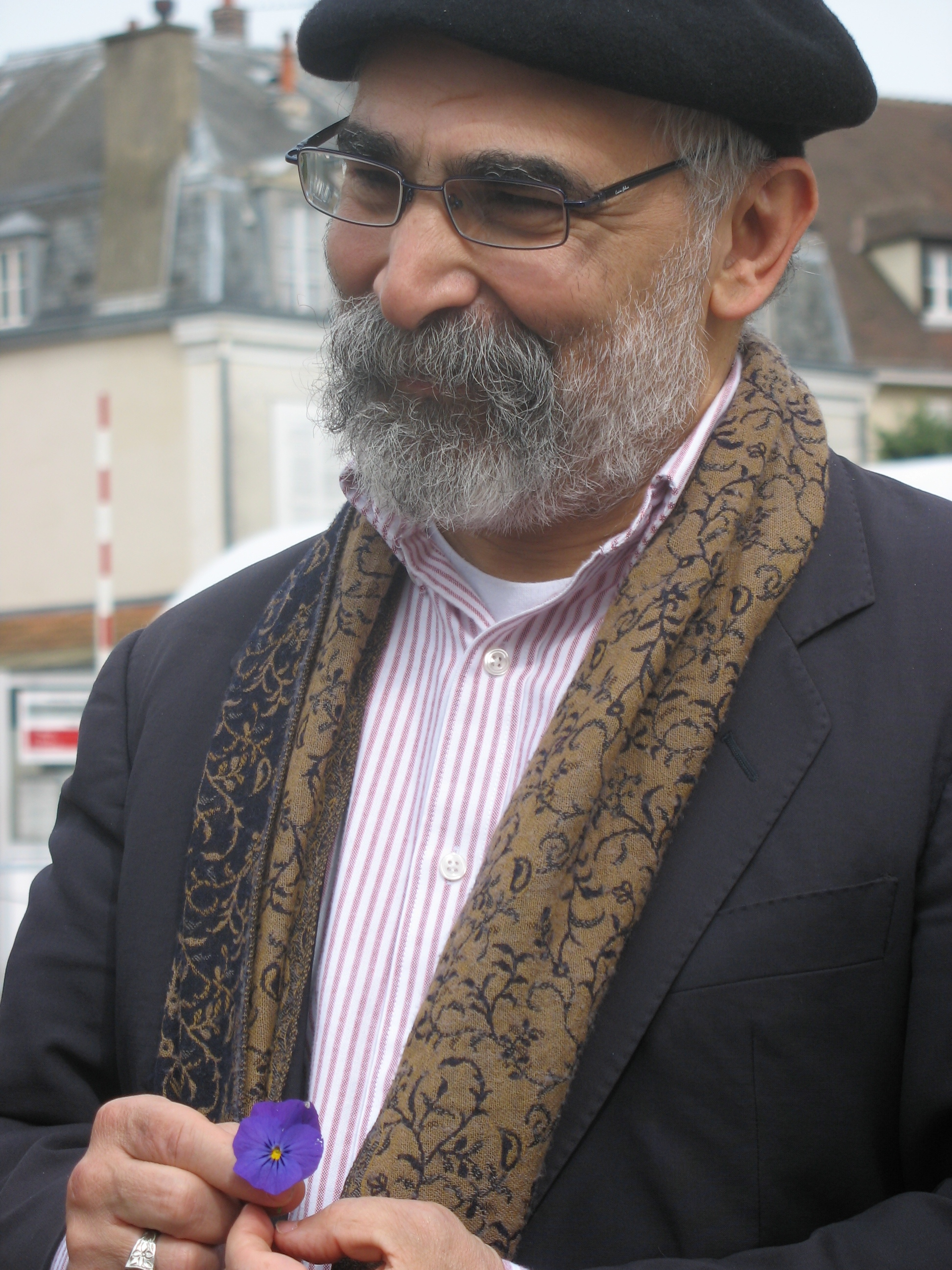
Seyed Mostafa Azmayesh

Seyed Mostafa Azmayesh is a French-Iranian jurist, scholar, and researcher. He is known for his research on Gnosticism, Islam, and Christianity. As a human rights activist, he has pushed for reform within fundamentalist regimes such as Iran, and the reform of social or legal practices that are in violation of human rights.

== Biography ==
Seyed Mostafa Azmayesh was born in Tehran, Iran, in 1952. On completion of his studies in Arabian Literature (Tehran 1974) and Law (Tehran 1975), he moved to France in 1976. In Paris, he studied Theology and History of Law at the Sorbonne University, as well as Comparative Studies of Islam and Christianity at the University of Lyon for which he received two doctorate degrees. One of his professors was the philosopher and theologian Henri Corbin. After completing his academic studies, he continued his research in the areas of religion, philosophy and various fields of science. Azmayesh was admitted into the lineage of initiates of the Nematollahi-Gonabadi order in 1969, which is the most popular and oldest Sufi order in Iran. Azmayesh is the official representative of the Shah Ni'matullah Wali Gonabadi Order outside of Iran.

Azmayesh founded a spiritual school.

== Human rights activities ==
=== Human rights efforts in Iran ===
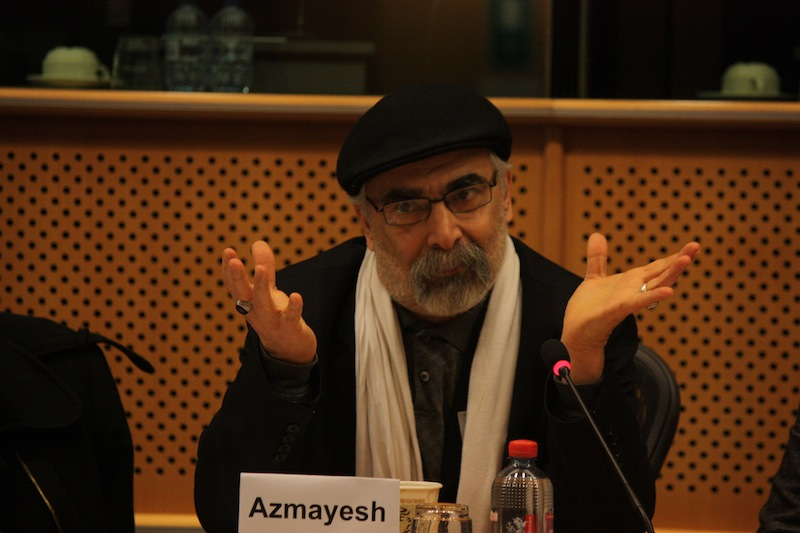
Speech at European Parliament in 2011 at the Conference on Human Rights in Iran

Since the onset of the Iranian Revolution in 1979, Azmayesh has worked to oppose those who propagate Islamist extremism. His activities have included talks in the United Nations (UN). He has argued that human rights principles are compatible with Quranic principles. For many years, Azmayesh has spoken in opposition to the practice of stoning in Iran.

In response to the uprising in 2009 following the presidential elections, he supported freedom of expression and free speech and campaigned for the freedom of prominent political prisoners such as Nasrin Sotoudeh and Narges Mohammadi, and religious and ethnic minorities such as the Kurds, Baha’i and Sufis. He has been influential in the release of numerous Sufis who were imprisoned by the extremist elements in the Iranian Regime as part of its program to suppress minorities.

=== Human rights efforts within Europe ===
He has spoken at a series of conferences in England, Germany, the British Parliament and the European Parliament, and published research-based proposals and reports to tackling the growing issues of violence and extremism.

Azmayesh co-founded the International Organisation to Preserve Human Rights (IOPHR) in February 2014, in order to continue his efforts to protect human rights for all, counter the rise of Islamist extremism and violence, and continue his advocacy for gender-equality and eliminating gender-based violence.

IOPHR is an active not-for-profit organisation and think tank based in the United Kingdom. It is a research-based organisation, with the aim of preserving human rights for all and eliminating threats to the safety and security of society. IOPHR conducts conferences in the UK Parliament, European Parliament, and across Europe, working closely with other activists, researchers, academics, public bodies such as the London Metropolitan Police, and other public service officials.

== See also ==
- Dervish
- 2018 Dervish protests
- Kasra Nouri
- Noor-Ali Tabandeh
