= Fashafouyeh Prison =

Penitentiary in Tehran Province, Iran

- Interactive map of Fashafouyeh Prison
- Location: Hasanabad Qom, Iran; 35.3625°N 51.3200°E
- Status: Operational
- Opened: 2011; 15 years ago
- Managed by: Judicial system of Iran; IRGC
- Warden: Asghar Fathei

Notable prisoners
- Kasra Nouri; Soheil Arabi; Ghasem Sholeh-Saadi

The Greater Tehran Central Penitentiary (Persian: زندان مرکزی تهران بزرگ) is a prison approximately 32 km (20 mi) south of Tehran. Sometimes called Tehran Central Prison, it is a large prison, also known as "فشافویه ", "Fashafuyeh" or "Hasanabad-e Qom Prison". It was built in 2012 in the Hasanabad region south of Tehran, in the deserts of the Tehran to Qom highway.
Several thousand prisoners have been or are being transferred to the Greater Tehran Central Penitentiary from Evin, Gohardasht (Rajai Shahr) and Ghezel Hessar prisons.
With an official capacity of 15,000 inmates, the prison is the largest detention facility in the country.

== Prison conditions ==
In June 2016, the Ghanoon newspaper was sued for describing widespread corruption and ill treatment of inmates at the penitentiary, as well as reporting on the prison's poor living conditions and ill treatment of detainees.

In August 2017, a detainee described torture and inhumane conditions, including overcrowding, unsanitary living spaces, intolerable heat with severely limited water resources and the denial of medical care.

In June 2019, a detainee reported that hundreds of juvenile prisoners under the age of 18 were being housed in the prison, many undocumented. Sexual exploitation of juvenile detainees is allegedly rampant in the prison. The firsthand account also states these minors were regularly abused and deprived of visitation rights.

A cemetery for executed prisoners is also located near the prison grounds.(Persian: قبرستان زندانیان اعدامی). Authorities at the prison reportedly locked up inmates in cells without running water from 11 a.m. to 8 p.m. According to reports, prison guards sell bottles of mineral water at a price of 10 thousand tomans (about 2.30 dollars) to prisoners.

Inmates have reported that there are no toilet facilities available. The toilet is a hole on the floor of a 2x2 foot area without light or running water, separated by a curtain from the ward's beds. The living conditions are so inhumane that quarantined inmates refer to the prison as the “place of exile”.

== See also ==
- List of prisons # Iran
- Human rights in Iran # Notable prisons
- Judicial system of Iran #Prison system
- Kasra Nouri
- Nasser Fahimi
- Alireza Shir Mohammad Ali
- 2018 Dervish protests
