= Domus Liceo Cavour =

- Domus del Liceo Cavour
- Interactive map of Domus Liceo Cavour
- 41.892598°N 12.490868°E
- Type: Archaeological site (Roman domus)
- Periods: Mid-2nd century A.D. (Middle Imperial)
- Cultures: Roman
- Associated with: Umbrius family (gens Umbrius)
- Location: Via Frangipane, Rome, Italy
- Nearest city: Rome

History
- Original use: Residential villa

Site notes
- Excavation dates: September 2025 – March 2026
- Archaeologists: Filippo Coarelli
- Discovered: 1895
- Condition: Intact subterranean chambers; mostly backfilled with earth
- Current use: Archaeological site / High school foundation
- Governing body: Special Superintendency of Rome

The Domus Liceo Cavour (or the Domus of the Cavour Lyceum) is an ancient Roman domus (luxury house) dating back to the mid-second century A.D. The archaeological site is located directly beneath the gymnasium of the Liceo Scientifico Cavour in Rome, Italy, in close proximity to the Colosseum.

Rediscovered through student exploration and subsequent excavation in early 2026, the villa features well-preserved frescoed walls, stucco ceilings, and mosaic flooring.

The site is located in a central sector of ancient Rome between the Carinae and the Esquiline Hill (l’Esquilino).

== History ==
The site was first encountered in the late 19th century during the construction of a Catholic missionary headquarters, which later became the high school. An inscription found at the time indicates the property likely belonged to the Umbrius family, who may have originated from Samnium.

Two historical owners of the domus were identified as Lucius Fabius Gallus and, later, Umbria Albina.

While part of the structure was documented during the initial construction, the site remained largely unexcavated. Local student rumors regarding hidden rooms beneath the school led to informal explorations by students. After these findings were reported by a teacher to the Special Superintendency of Rome, formal excavations began in January 2026. The discovery was publicly announced on May 28, 2026, by archaeologist Filippo Coarelli.

Only a portion of the villa has been excavated. The Special Superintendency of Rome and the liceo scientifico plan to continue research and eventually open the site to the public with students serving as guides.
