= Cecilia Sala =

Italian journalist

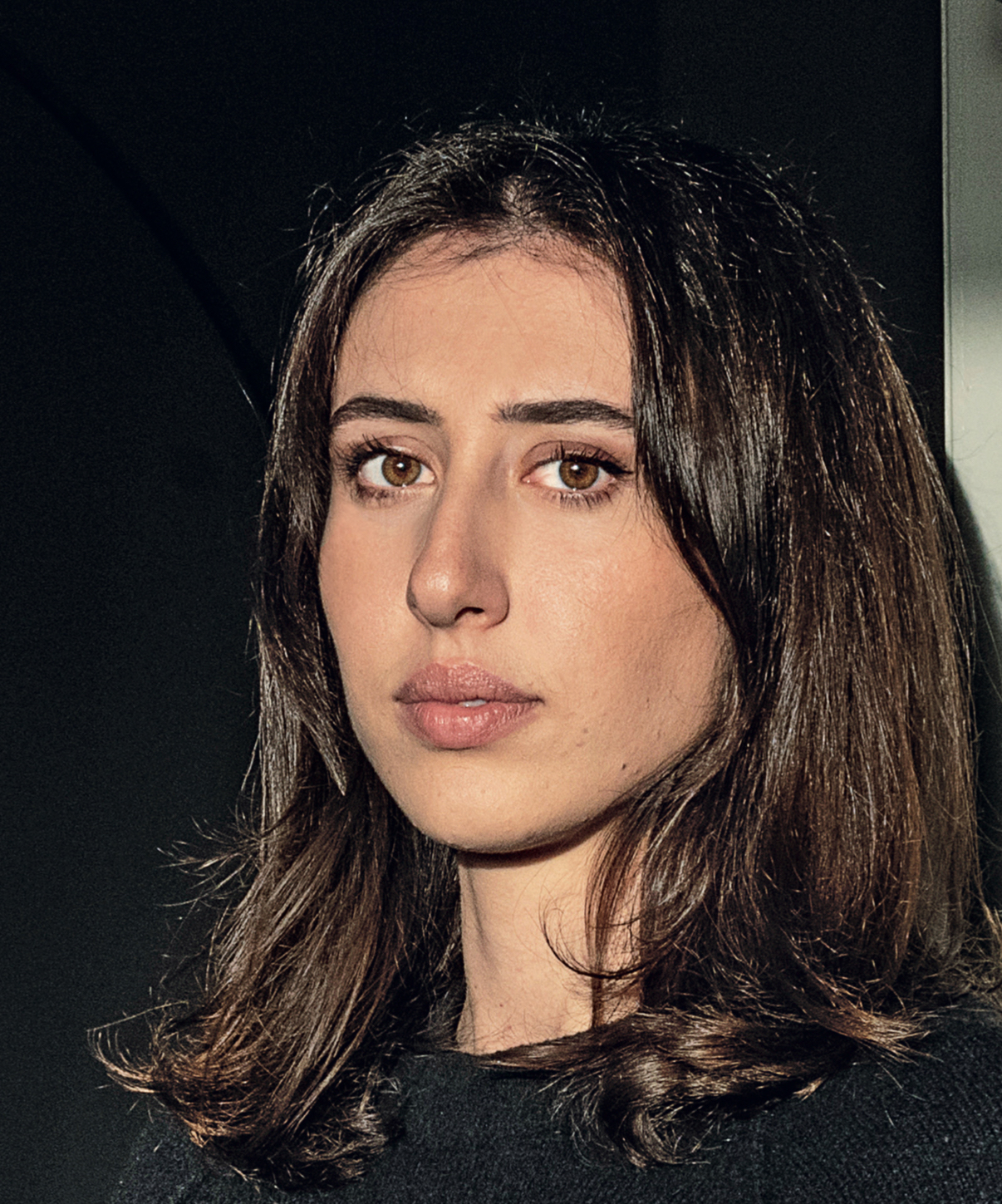
- Sala in 2025
- Born: 26 July 1995 (age 31); Rome, Italy
- Education: L.S.S. Camillo Cavour; Bocconi University; La Sapienza University
- Occupations: journalist; author; war correspondent
- Years active: 2015–present
- Employer: Il Foglio (2019–present)

Cecilia Sala (Italian: [tʃeˈtʃiːlja ˈsaːla]; born 26 July 1995) is an Italian journalist, specialized in political and war journalism, both as an author and war correspondent.

== Biography ==
Sala was born on 26 July 1995 in Rome. Her father is Renato Sala, a JP Morgan's senior advisor since 2004 and an independent director of the Italian bank Banca Monte dei Paschi di Siena since 2023; her mother is Elisabetta Vernoni, a manager and environmental activist.

She graduated from the Liceo scientifico statale Camillo Cavour in Rome. From 2014 to 2018, she attended the bachelor's program in economics at the Luigi Bocconi University in Milan, without completing the degree, as she moved back to Rome for work reasons and enrolled at La Sapienza University.

In 2015, she started working as a correspondent and reporter for Vice, then as a journalist for the La7 TV program Servizio pubblico in 2016. She later wrote for L'Espresso and Vanity Fair, among others, and she also worked for RAI, Fremantle Media and the La7 TV program Otto e mezzo.

In 2019, she registered with the Italian Order of Journalists of Lazio, officially becoming a professional journalist per Italian law. Since 2019, Sala works for Il Foglio; she's also author for the Huffington Post, Mondadori, and the podcast company Chora Media.

Working for Il Foglio, she reported as foreign correspondent from Venezuela and Chile, among others, as well as war correspondent from Afghanistan (2021 Taliban offensive) and Ukraine (Russo-Ukrainian War). She also reported from Iran, both before and during the 2024 Iran–Israel conflict.

== Prisoner exchange between Italy and Iran ==
On 19 December 2024, while in Iran on a journalist visa, she was arrested in Tehran and put in solitary confinement in Evin Prison. This became known only on 27 December. On 30 December, Iran's Ministry of Culture finally confirmed that they had arrested her for "violating the laws of the Islamic Republic".

Her arrest came three days after Italy arrested Iranian engineer Mohammad Abedini Najafabadi at Milan Malpensa Airport at the request of the United States, which accused him, together with an accomplice arrested in the country, of conspiring to circumvent embargoes and supplying sophisticated electronic components from the United States to Iran. Abedini is also accused of giving material support to Iranian Islamic Revolutionary Guard Corps—designated as a Foreign Terrorist Organization by the United States—allegedly contributing to a drone attack on a US military base in Jordan that killed three U.S. Army Reserve soldiers and injured 47 others.

On 3 January 2025, Iran reportedly asked for a prisoner swap. On 8 January 2025, Italian Prime Minister Giorgia Meloni announced that Sala had been released by Iranian authorities and had left the country, later landing at Rome Ciampino Airport in the afternoon of the same day.

Meloni cited a triangulation between US, Italy, and Iran helped for her to be released, explicitly denying the alleged involvement of Elon Musk, also denied by Iran Foreign Ministry spokesman Esmail Baghaei. Contacted by Sala's boyfriend through Andrea Stroppa, Musk said he did not contact Iran but played only a small role and recommended US support.

On 12 January, Abedini was released back to Iran.

== Works ==
- Sala, Cecilia (18 November 2025). The Fire. Translated by Stransky, Oonagh. ISBN 979-8-88966-150-4.

== See also ==
- List of foreign nationals detained in Iran
