= Evin Prison =

Prison in Tehran, Iran

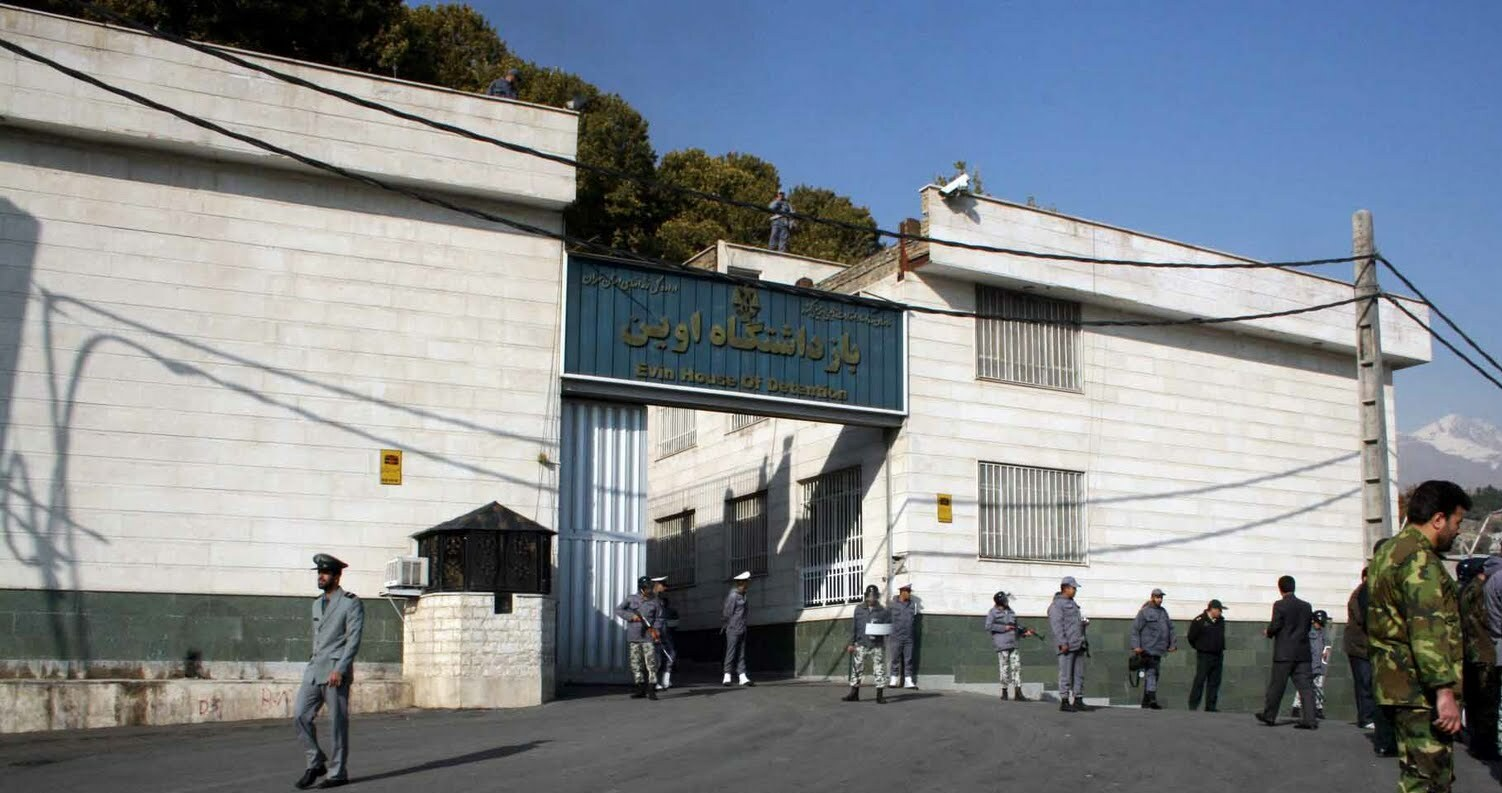
- Evin Prison's main entrance in 2008
- Location in Tehran
- Location: Evin; 35.796°N 51.384°E
- Status: Operational
- Capacity: est. 15,000 (1983)
- Opened: 1972; 54 years ago
- Managed by: Judicial system of Iran
- Warden: Hamid Mohammadi

Notable prisoners
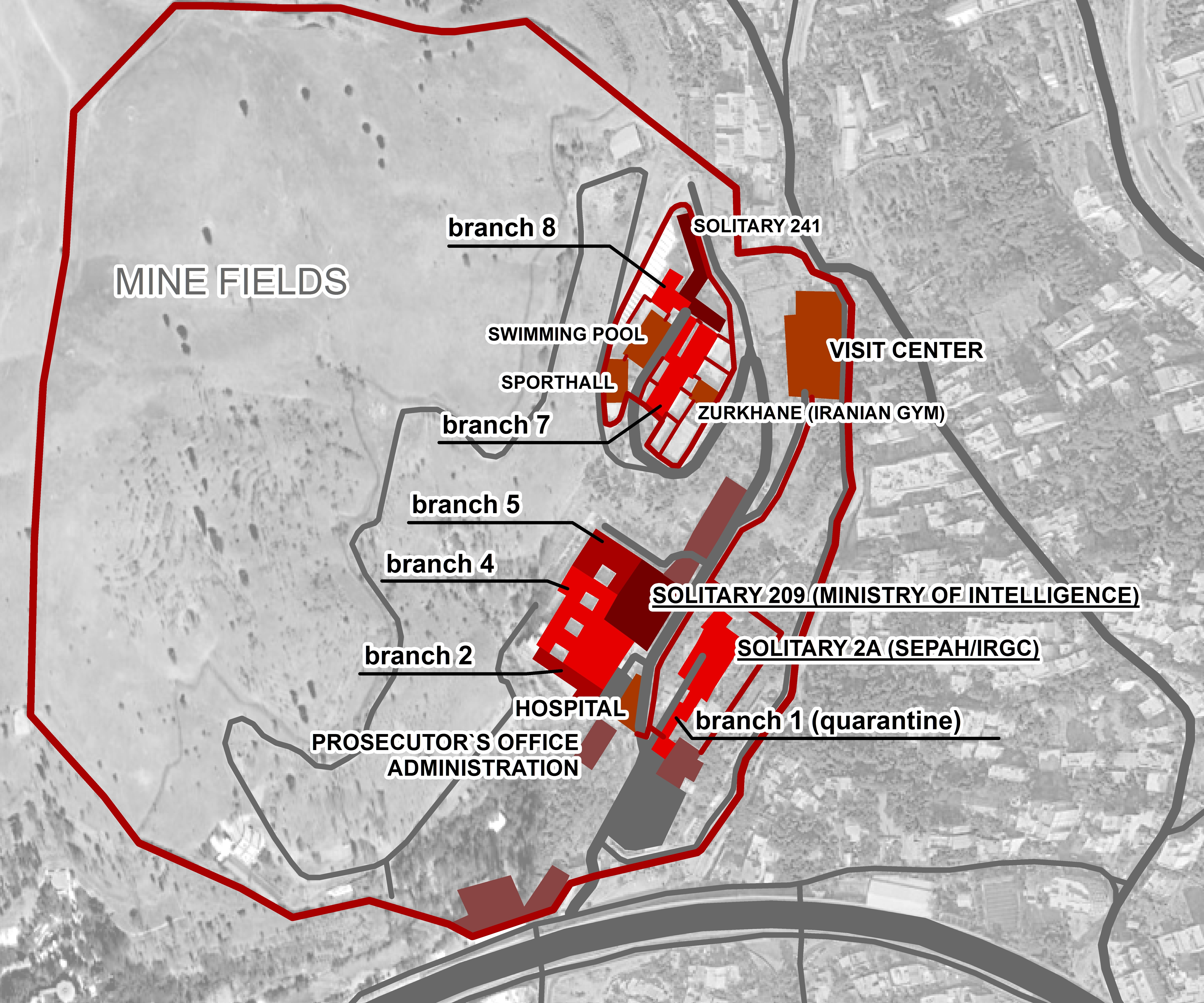
- Narges Mohammadi, Nazanin Zaghari-Ratcliffe, Kylie Moore-Gilbert, Siamak Namazi, Emad Sharghi, Maziar Bahari Evin prison map as it was in 2025

Evin Prison (Persian: زندان اوین, romanized: Zendân-e-Evin) is a prison located in the Evin neighborhood of Tehran, Iran. Established in 1972, and particularly notorious since the 1979 Islamic Revolution, it has become the Islamic Republic's most infamous detention facility. The prison serves as the primary site for incarcerating political prisoners, journalists, academics, human rights activists, dual nationals, and foreign citizens accused of espionage or propaganda offenses.

The prison has become internationally known for its systematic human rights abuses. Numerous reports document torture methods such as beatings, electric shocks, mock executions, prolonged solitary confinement, forced confessions, sleep deprivation, and sexual abuse. In recent years, cases such as the mistreatment of imprisoned scholar Mahvash Seydal have highlighted the regime's deliberate denial of medical care to female political prisoners as a form of punishment. A deadly fire in October 2022 further exposed the prison's chaotic conditions and the authorities' failure to protect detainees.

Evin Prison has become a symbol of the Islamic Republic's apparatus of repression, silencing dissent through fear, violence, and psychological terror. Often likened to 'Iran's Bastille,' it holds a special place in the political imagination of many Iranians, symbolizing the Islamic Republic's absolutist rule and intolerance of dissent. People have been detained in Evin Prison for reasons including political dissent, activism, alleged espionage, and religious beliefs, particularly those of religious minorities like the Baháʼí community and Christian converts. Several foreign nationals, including journalists such as Italian reporter Cecilia Sala, have been detained at Evin, often used as political leverage in Iran's international negotiations.

Evin Prison has been repeatedly condemned by international organizations including Amnesty International, Human Rights Watch, the UN Special Rapporteur, and Iranian human rights groups for the atrocities committed within its walls.

On 23 June 2025, Israeli airstrikes targeted the prison. According to Iranian media, activists and human rights groups, among the dead and injured were family members of prisoners, social workers, a lawyer, doctors and nurses, a 5-year-old child, teenage soldiers guarding the doors as part of their compulsory military service, administrative staff and residents of the area. The deaths of five prisoners who had been convicted of financial crimes and the escape of an "insignificant number of inmates" was later confirmed. The attack was the deadliest in the conflict. Surviving political prisoners were transferred to other prisons.

== Location and description ==
Evin Prison is located in Tehran, Iran, in a residential and commercial area known as Evin, next to the Saadat Abad district. A large park area with a popular upscale teahouse and restaurant is immediately next to it. Photography in front of and around the prison is forbidden. It is on the edge of District 3.

The place is located at the foot of the Alborz mountains on the land that was the former home of Ziaeddin Tabatabaee, who briefly served as prime minister in the 1920s. Prisoners from Evin and Ghezel Hesar prison are to be transferred eventually to the Central Prison of Tehran, also known as Fashafaviye or Fashafoyeh.

The prison grounds include an execution yard, a courtroom, and separate blocks for common criminals and female inmates.

== History ==
=== Pre-1979 ===
Evin Prison was constructed in 1972 under the reign of Mohammad Reza Pahlavi, before the 1979 Islamic Revolution that installed the Islamic theocracy. However, as noted by The Atlantic, since then "it has become a symbol of the Islamic Republic's absolutist rule and intolerance of any dissent".

Evin was originally operated by the Shah's security and intelligence service, SAVAK. It was initially designed to house 320 inmates—20 in solitary cells and 300 in two large communal blocks—and was expanded to hold more than 1,500 prisoners, including 100 solitary cells for political prisoners, by 1977. Notable prisoners at Evin before the 1979 revolution include Ayatollah Mahmoud Taleghani and Grand Ayatollah Hossein-Ali Montazeri. On 11 February 1979, during the Iranian Revolution, crowds of rebels stormed the prison and freed all the inmates.

=== 1970s–1990s ===
After Iran became a republic, the prison population was again expanded, to 15,000 inmates. According to scholar Ervand Abrahamian: "In theory, Evin was a detention center for those awaiting trial", after which the prisoners would be transferred to another prison, either Qezel Hesar or Gohardasht Prison. "In reality, Evin served as a regular prison, as many waited years before being brought to trial". Prominent prisoners often served their entire sentences in Evin. Executions were carried out at Evin.

Following the 1979 Iranian Revolution, Mohammad Kachouyi was made warden of Evin. After Kachouyi's assassination in June 1981, Asadollah Lajevardi, the chief prosecutor of Tehran, served as warden until 1985. In 1998, the People's Mujahedin of Iran assassinated Lajevardi.

A prisoner held after the Islamic revolution was Marina Nemat, who spent two years in Evin starting in 1982 for participating in anti-regime protests at her school. She has written about her torture and the death of her fellow students at the prison. In her 2013 memoir, Face to Face with the Beast: Iranian Women in Mullahs' Prisons, the former Iranian nurse Hengameh Haj Hassan wrote about her incarceration in Evin prison in 1981, after being arrested for suspected connections with the Mojahedin. She described a system in which female inmates were frequently and systematically tortured by members of Iran's Islamic Revolutionary Guard, mostly by being beaten on the soles of their feet with cables. She also describes mass executions:

"In Unit 209, every day about 6.00pm, at dinner time, we heard an enormous and deafening noise, like a lorry shedding a heavy load of metal... It was the discharge of tens of firearms being fired at once on our friends".

Iran's judicial system is based on Islamic law (sharia). The system is supervised by the Minister of Justice and the chief public prosecutor, appointed by the Supreme Leader.

=== 2000s ===
Political prisoners of note held at Evin have included Akbar Ganji (held there from 2000 to 2006), Mohsen Sazegara (in 2003), Nasser Zarafshan, Hamid Pourmand (2005–06), Dariush Zahedi, a professor at the University of California, Berkeley, on charges of espionage (2003), subsequently acquitted in 2004, and Ramin Jahanbegloo (2006).

On 23 June 2003, Iranian-Canadian photojournalist Zahra Kazemi was arrested for taking photographs in front of the prison, and died of blunt trauma to the head while imprisoned. The Iranian government said that she died from a stroke while being interrogated. Doctors examining Kazemi's body found evidence of rape, torture, and a skull fracture.

At dawn on 27 July 2008, the Iranian government hanged 29 people at Evin Prison.

Iranian music producer and composer Hangi Tavakoli was held in a solitary cell in Section 209 from December 2008 to February 2009 for the crime of "Action Against National Security" because of some of the music he had written and produced, which the Iranian government labeled "Brainwashing Against the Government". He was sentenced to death by hanging, but due to human rights campaigns initiated by the public, the Iranian Justice System reduced his sentence to 3 months imprisonment and a US$100,000 penalty, conditional upon totally ceasing all his musical activities. Tavakoli continues his work outside Iran, a renowned record producer.

Esha Momeni, a student at the California State University, Northridge in Iran to visit family and research women's rights in the country was arrested on 15 October 2008 for crimes against national security, and held at Evin. She was released on 11 November 2008.

On 17 November 2008, Ali Ashtari, a computer wholesaler who provided intelligence about Iran's nuclear facilities to Mossad, the Israeli intelligence agency, was hanged at Evin Prison after being convicted in June 2008. In late November 2008, journalist / blogger Hossein Derakhshan was held at Evin after his arrest in November 2008, accused of spying for Israel, and sentenced to 19½ years in prison on 28 September 2010.

Roxana Saberi, an Iranian-American journalist, was arrested in January 2009 for reporting without press credentials, with a charge of espionage added in April. She was held in the Evin Prison until her release in May 2009.

French student Clotilde Reiss stood trial in August 2009.

Over the years, Iranian converts to Christianity have been detained. On 5 March 2009, Marzieh Amirizadeh Esmaeilabad and Maryam Rustampoor were arrested by Iranian security forces and labeled "anti-government activists". The women were held at Evin Prison. On 18 November 2009, they were released without bail, but the charges were not dropped. In May 2010, Maryam and Marzieh were cleared of all charges.

Three Belgian tourists, Vincent Boon-Falleur, Idesbald Van den Bosch, and Diego Mathieu, were detained in Evin Prison for three months in 2009. Van den Bosch and Boon-Falleur were arrested on 5 September 2009 for entering an unmarked Iranian Military Zone near Semnan. They were detained in Semnan for three days, then transferred to Evin. Mathieu was arrested on 16 September at the Iran-Turkmenistan border because the three had met on 4 September and exchanged phone numbers. The three were accused of spying and detained for three months, from 8 September to 8 December 2009, in Section 209 of Evin, initially in solitary confinement and then in four-person cells with Iranian prisoners. They were released thanks to Belgian diplomatic negotiations.

Iranian-Canadian journalist Maziar Bahari, in Iran to cover the 2009 Iran presidential election, was imprisoned in Evin for 118 days. Bahari documented his time at Evin in his memoir, titled Then They Came for Me: A Family's Story of Love, Captivity, and Survival, which was published by Random House in 2011. The memoir is the basis of the film Rosewater, which was written and directed by former The Daily Show host Jon Stewart. The film's title is the nickname Bahari gave his interrogator/torturer at Evin due to his cologne.

Three long-time Middle-Eastern residents, Shane Bauer, Joshua Fattal, and Sarah Shourd, who were on holiday in Iraqi Kurdistan and were detained by Iran, were held in Evin Prison since the beginning of August 2009. Shourd was kept in solitary confinement. The Washington Post reported that they "were arrested in July [2009] by Iranian border guards while hiking in the mountainous Kurdish region between Iraq and Iran. Their families say they crossed the border accidentally, but a top Iranian prosecutor last month accused the three of spying." In December 2009, Iran's foreign minister Manouchehr Mottaki said the three would be put on trial, in a move that coincided with other points of contention between the two countries. Sarah Shourd was freed on US$500,000 bail on 14 September 2010. Two days earlier, the three Americans had been charged with espionage by Iranian prosecutors. Bauer and Fattal were released in September 2011.

Masoud Jamali, an Iranian-American television and music producer and owner of Tapesh Television based in Los Angeles, was imprisoned in Evin in 2012 for one year, charged with propaganda against Iran, and forbidden to leave Iran for three years.

The prison also held members of religious minorities, including members of the Baháʼí Faith; on 14 May 2008, members of an informal body that oversaw the needs of the Baháʼí community in Iran were arrested and taken to Evin. They were held in Section 209 of the prison which is run by the government's Ministry of Intelligence. On 11 August 2010, it became known that the court sentence was 20 years imprisonment for each of the seven prisoners, later reduced to ten years. After the sentence, they were transferred to Gohardasht Prison.

According to Roxana Saberi, the two Baháʼí women were confined in a small cell about four meters by five meters, with two small metal-covered windows. They had no bed. "They must sleep on blankets [...] They have no pillows, either. They roll up a blanket to use as a pillow. They use their chadors as a bed sheet."

Vahid Asghari, studying in India, was arrested in 2008 at Tehran Imam Khomeini International Airport and held in custody. Asghari had sued Fars News (IRGC media) and IRIB (Islamic Republic of Iran Broadcasting) at the fourth branch of the Culture and Media Court due to the false accusation that was attributed to him when he was in the known 350 ward of Evin 2011.

=== 2010–2022 ===
Abdolmalek Rigi, the leader of Jundullah, was executed in the prison in 2010 From January to May 2010, student activist Majid Tavakoli was held in Evin, primarily in solitary confinement. He began a hunger strike to protest the conditions of his imprisonment and was transferred to Gohardasht Prison in August 2010.

Human rights blogger and U.S. National Press Club honoree Kouhyar Goudarzi served a one-year prison term in Evin in 2010 for "spreading propaganda against the regime". On 31 July 2011, he was rearrested and believed to be held in solitary confinement in Evin.

Iranian laser physicist Omid Kokabee, who at the time of arrest was a student of University of Texas at Austin, was imprisoned at Evin in February 2011 and sentenced to 10 years of imprisonment on charges of collaboration with an enemy.

Amir Mahdi Adib Movahed, a journalist and dissident, was arrested in March 2017 and was transferred to "Two A" ward of Evin prison. After four months of interrogation, he was released on bail until the end of the proceedings. He was arrested again in September, 2017 and was transferred to Birjand Central Prison. According to the judicial rulings issued by the Birjand Revolutionary Court, he was sentenced to a total of 21 years in prison on the charges of propaganda against the regime, insulting the leader of the Islamic Republic, and "disturbing the public mind".

Majid Jamali Fashi, convicted of assassinating Iranian scientist Masoud Alimohammadi and a suspected Mossad spy, was hanged on 15 May 2012 after being convicted on 28 August 2011.

Nasser Fahimi, a doctor and human rights activist, was arrested by the Ministry of Information on July 20, 2009, and sentenced to 15 years in prison by the 15th Branch of Tehran Revolutionary Court, headed by Judge Abolqasem Salavati, on the charges of acting against the country's security, disturbing public opinion, insulting the leadership, and threatening the judicial authorities. He is the first figure in the political history of Iran who formally requested the Islamic Republic to revoke his Iranian citizenship due to the type of government (dictatorship).

Saeed Abedini, an Iranian-American pastor, was sentenced on 27 January 2013 to 8 years imprisonment on charges of evangelizing for his Christian faith. The Obama administration secured his release in a prisoner swap in January 2016.

Mohammad Heidari and Kourosh Ahmadi, accused of spying for the CIA and Mossad, were executed in the prison on 19 May 2013 after being sentenced to death by Tehran's Revolutionary Court for various counts of espionage.

Marzieh Rasouli, a journalist who writes about culture and the arts for several of Iran's reformist and independent publications, was arrested in 2012 and accused of collaborating with the BBC. In 2014 she was convicted of "spreading propaganda" and "disturbing the public order". Sentenced to two years in prison and 50 lashes, she was sent to Evin Prison on 8 July 2014. PEN International called for her "immediate and unconditional" release.

On 5 October 2013, Hossein Rajabian Iranian filmmaker and Mehdi Rajabian, a musician, were arrested by the Iranian security forces. They were held for two months in Section 2A (solitary confinement) of the Evin prison. Finally, on 22 December 2015, at Branch 28 court of the Tehran, they were sentenced to six years in prison for "insulting the sacred" and "propaganda against the state" through artistic activity, as well as a 200 million Toman (about US$66,650) fine.

Maryam Shafipour, an Iranian human rights activist, spent seven months of pre-trial detention in Evin Prison, including more than two months in solitary confinement. Shafipour was sentenced in March 2014 to seven years in prison for her political activities. Human rights organizations have called for her release and condemned her conviction and prison sentence. She was released in July 2015.

Seyed Hamed Hooriaband worked at the Iranian Embassy in Paris, France. Having taken the side of the people in joining protests for the Green Movement and the opposition in Paris at the 2009 presidential elections, he was fired, targeted, harassed, and made an example of by the Islamic regime so none of the other diplomatic government officials' family members would dare to oppose from within the system publicly. After having his family threatened by the Ministry of Intelligence and Security while he was in Paris, he returned to Iran. In October 2011, security agents raided his parents' home and arrested him without charge. He was put in solitary confinement at the Evin Prison in section 240, reserved for political prisoners, where he endured psychological torture, before being charged with espionage and embezzlement. Revolutionary Court judge Salavati then sentenced him without due process of law or access to a lawyer. He was sentenced to two years in prison for espionage and one year and ten months for embezzlement. The court then acquitted him of embezzlement, but even though the sentence was revoked, he was unlawfully kept for another 13 months in prison and was fined. He was later released on bail for good conduct.

From February to April 2018, Sufi activist Kasra Nouri during the 2018 Dervish protests was held in Evin, primarily in solitary confinement. He was later transferred to Fashafoyeh Prison, but was sent back to Evin in January 2021.

Behdad Esfahbod, an Iranian-Canadian software engineer, was detained at Evin Prison in January 2020. Australian academic Kylie Moore-Gilbert was a prisoner here before being moved to Qarchak Prison in August 2020, although she was later moved back to Evin. She was released in November 2020.

In February 2022, Belgian aid worker Olivier Vandecasteele, who was working as a volunteer for Relief International in Iran, was arrested with "espionage" charges, and subsequently detained at Evin Prison. After being initially sentenced to 40 years in prison for spying, money laundering and currency smuggling in January 2023, Vandecasteele was freed in May of the same year, following a prisoner swap for Iranian ex-diplomat Asadollah Asadi.

=== During the Mahsa Amini protests (2022) ===
In October 2022, during the 2021–2022 Iranian protests, a riot police unit cracked down on prisoners, and a deadly fire killed at least eight people. In November of the same year, Farideh Moradkhani, a niece and a critic of Ali Khamenei, was arrested and taken to Evin prison.

On 28 September 2022, 30-year-old Italian travel blogger Alessia Piperno was arrested in Tehran and detained at Evin Prison, in the midst of the Mahsa Amini protests; following diplomatic negotiations between the Italian Ministry of Foreign Affairs and Iranian authorities, Piperno was released and returned to Rome on 10 November.

On 15 October 2022, amidst the Mahsa Amini protests, a severe fire started in this prison, and the sound of security forces shooting was heard from inside the prison during numerous clashes with prisoners. The Center for Human Rights in Iran confirmed that it had received reports that there was a "gun battle" in Evin prison on Saturday night that was continuing at 22:00 local time. Videos shared on social media on Saturday showed smoke rising from the prison. Repeated gunfire, as well as anti-government chants and anti-government slogans can be heard. Media affiliated with the Islamic Revolutionary Guard Corps and Iranian government reported the conflict and fire. According to the Judiciary Media Center, during a fight between several prisoners in Ward 6 and Ward 7, both of which are special prisons for financial convictions and theft, the sewing workshop of the prison caught fire. Families of prisoners in Evin and various others gathered near the prison. Government forces used tear gas against them in response. Security forces blocked Yadegar-e-Emam Expressway to prevent people from approaching.

=== 2022–Jan 2025 ===
In September 2023, a New York Times article reported that Johan Floderus, a 33-year-old Swedish man who had been working as a diplomat for the European Union since 2019, had been arrested at the Imam Khomeini International Airport in Tehran in April 2022 and taken to Evin Prison.

In August 2023, Kurdish human rights activist Verisheh Moradi was arrested in Sanandaj, Iran. After being held in a local detention center for thirteen days, she was transferred to Ward 209 of Evin Prison where she was held in solitary confinement for five months. In December 2023, Moradi was transferred into the Evin Prison's women's ward.

Cecilia Sala, a 29-year-old Italian journalist and war correspondent, was arrested in Tehran on 19 December 2024, while reporting in the capital. Her arrest was kept secret even in Italy so as not to hinder diplomatic work, and was only made public on 27 December. Sala, who works for the newspaper Il Foglio and the podcast company Chora Media, was held in solitary confinement until the penultimate day of her detention, which lasted 21 days. She was interrogated every day for the first two weeks, less often on the remaining days, and for 10 consecutive hours on the last day. She was freed by the Italian secret services on 8 January 2025 through intense diplomatic work. The unclear official circumstances of her detention prompted calls for her release by international press freedom organizations. In fact, she had been taken hostage to obtain the release of the Iranian-Swiss citizen Mohammad Abedini Najafabadi, accused by the USA of terrorism and arrested at Milan Malpensa airport on 16 December, three days before Sala, then released back to Iran on 12 January.

=== 2025 ===
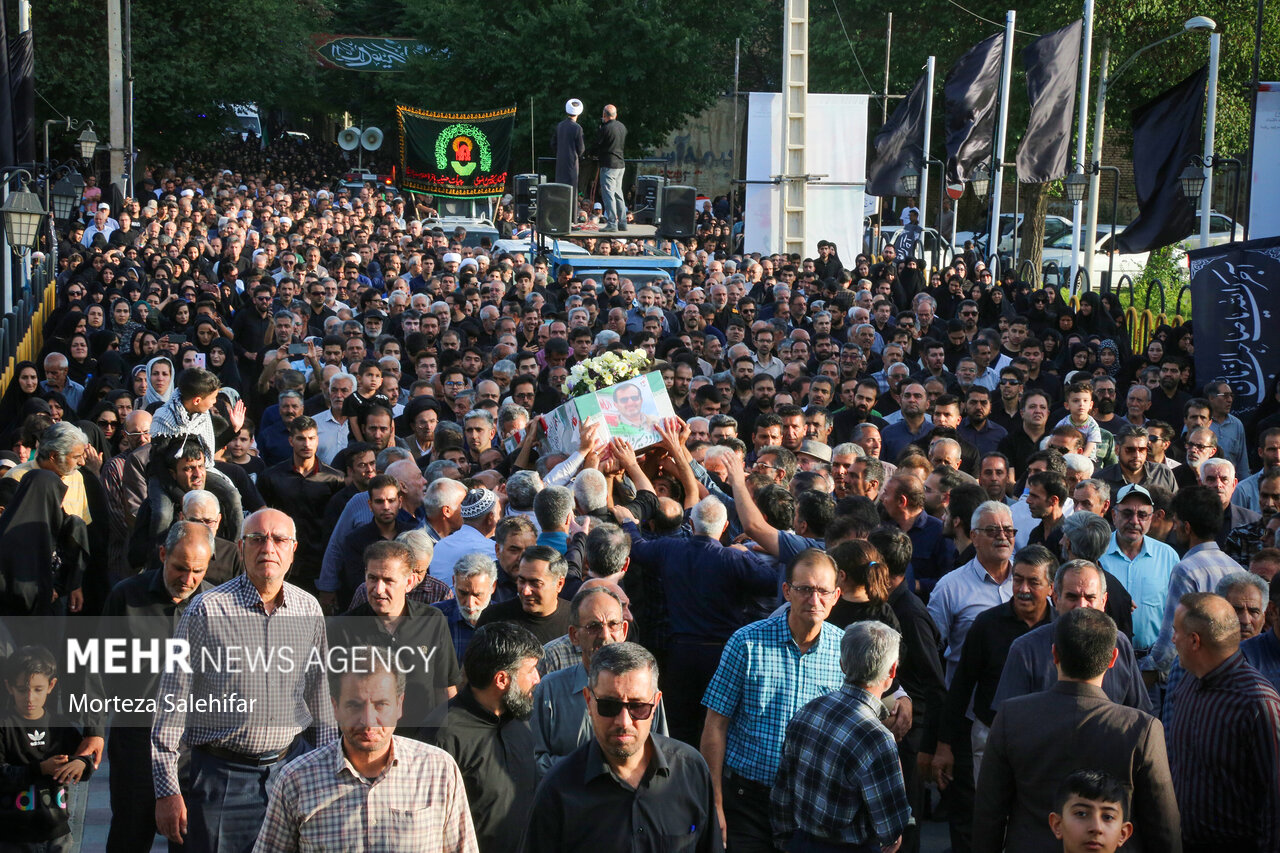
Funeral of Davood Shirvani, Iranian physician killed in Israeli airstrike on Evin Prison.

On Monday 23 June 2025, during the Twelve-Day War, Israel launched airstrikes targeting parts of the prison, with the Israeli military stating that the strike aimed at the prison's entrance gate. In the wake of the attack, reports indicated that groups of families of political prisoners and local residents attempted to reach the prison. This strike occurred alongside Israeli attacks on other facilities linked to Iran's internal security apparatus, including the Basij Headquarters, Seyyed al-Shohada Corps, Thar-Allah Headquarters, Alborz Corps, Intelligence Protection Command of the Police Force, and the Police Force Intelligence Headquarters.

The Israeli strikes that occurred during visiting hours, caused extensive damage to the prison, including the destruction of the library, the prisoners' meeting area, the clinic, the prosecutor's office, and several prison cells, which were severely damaged, according to human rights groups and relatives of prisoners. One of the missiles hit the entrance to the prison, where prisoners often wait to be transferred to the hospital or court.

According to Iranian media, activists and human rights groups, among the dead and injured were family members of prisoners, social workers, a lawyer, doctors and nurses, a 5-year-old child, teenage soldiers guarding the doors as part of their compulsory military service, administrative staff and residents of the area. It later confirmed the deaths of five prisoners who had been convicted of financial crimes and the escape of an "insignificant number of inmates".

The attack was the deadliest in the conflict. Surviving political prisoners were transferred to other prisons, such as Nasrin Javadi who in July was moved to Qarchak Prison.

Shortly after the explosions occurred at Evin Prison, a video surfaced on X and Telegram featuring the hashtag "#freeevin". The content of the posts and videos seemed to lack authenticity. According to the researchers, these videos were part of an "Israeli deception".

The New York Times did originally report on 6 July 2025 in an article by Farnaz Fassihi and two other authors, that after the attack some 100 transgender individuals were missing, who had been imprisoned in Evin. Later research, conducted by journalists of the German TAZ, could not confirm that statement. After contacting the New York Times Iranian source Reza Shafakhah, the lawyer denied ever making that claim in his call with Fassihi. After his account, he had no idea if transgender people were missing after the attack or how many transgender people are imprisoned in Iran. He suggested, Fassihi wanted to contradict Israeli public statements with a dramatic reveal for publicity reasons.

On the day of the attack, France's foreign minister, Jean-Noel Barrot said on Twitter, "The strike targeting Evin prison in Tehran, put our citizens Cécile Kohler and Jacques Paris, who have been held for three years, in danger. It is unacceptable". The two French citizens were not the only foreigners held at Evin at the time if the attack. Reuters said the attack clearly showed that Israel was escalating the war "beyond military and nuclear sites to aim squarely at the pillars of Iran's ruling system".

UK-based broadcasting service, Iran International said that following the attack, inmates described a violent evacuation. They were transferred to Greater Tehran Prison and Qarchak Women's Prison, both reportedly overcrowded, unsanitary, and experiencing shortages of food and clean water. In addition, prisoners reported being denied medical treatment and access to vital prescription medications.

=== 2026 ===
By 2 March 2026 during the 2026 Iran war, according to the wife of Mostafa Mohammadhasan, a political prisoner in Evin Prison, Iranian riot police (NOPO) had taken over control of the prison from the usual prison staff. Reports claim that during the war prisoners have been abandoned in locked cells, while guards have been largely absent leaving prisoners trapped without proper oversight, food, or support. Iran Human Rights (IHR) says since the outbreak of the war and ongoing internet blackout, reports about prisoner safety and access to essentials have surfaced, although details remain limited because of communication restrictions.

Female prisoners at Evin Prison reported a lack of medical care, including restrictions on doctor visits and access to necessary treatments.

== Women in Evin ==
Women have their own dedicated section in Evin. They live in four overcrowded cells, often sharing spaces with up to 20 people. These cells are cramped, with bunk beds stacked three-high; they lack basic amenities, and offer little privacy, with inmates having to wait in long lines for access to toilets and hygiene facilities.

Interrogation and torture are common in Evin, where detainees face physical and psychological abuse, including recurring threats of execution. Prisoners are subjected to violence in attempts to force false confessions, and the trauma of these experiences is often compounded by the constant fear of being sentenced to death.

== Allegations of rape and torture ==
In August 2009, President Mahmoud Ahmadinejad said in a live broadcast on state radio on rape and torture in Iranian prisons, "In some detention centers, inappropriate measures have taken place for which the enemy was again responsible."

Following the 2009 Iranian presidential election and subsequent protests, Iranian presidential candidate Mehdi Karroubi said several protesters held behind bars had been savagely raped, according to a confidential letter to senior cleric and former President Akbar Hashemi Rafsanjani. Karroubi said this was a "fragment" of the evidence he had and that if the denials did not stop, he would release even more.

It is said that interrogators have used rape in Iran for decades. During the 1980s, the rape of female political prisoners was so prevalent that it prompted Hussein-Ali Montazeri, Supreme Leader Ayatollah Khomeini's deputy, to write to Khomeini in a letter dated 7 October 1986: "Did you know that young women are raped in some of the prisons of the Islamic Republic?" Two prominent members of Iran's human rights community, the feminist lawyer and journalist Shadi Sadr and the blogger and activist Mojtaba Saminejad published essays online from inside Iran saying prison rape has a long history in the Islamic Republic.

In August 2021, hacktivist group "Edaalate-Ali" (lit. 'Ali's Justice'), leaked CCTV footage showing mistreatment of inmates, including a cleric walking over the body of an elderly man, who was dragged across the institution by prison guards. The head of Iran's prison system, Mohammad Mehdi Haj-Mohammadi, apologized for the incident.

== Legal implications ==
In April 2025, the European Union imposed sanctions on Hedayatollah Farzadi, the director of Evin Prison, as part of a broader response to Iran's detention of EU citizens. The EU accused Farzadi of being directly responsible for severe human rights violations against political prisoners, including arbitrary solitary confinement and restrictions on communication and visitation rights. These measures were enacted amidst growing concerns over Iran's use of foreign detainees as political leverage, with Evin Prison frequently cited as a central facility in such practices.

In the event of a future regime change in Iran, those responsible for human rights violations in Evin Prison may be held accountable. According to The Economist, the testimonies in White Torture, a 2022 book that documents the experiences of women in the prison, could serve as key evidence in potential legal proceedings. The book includes the names of interrogators and officials involved in the abuse, which could play a crucial role in efforts to achieve justice.

== Notable prisoners ==
- Narges Mohammadi – Human rights activist repeatedly imprisoned in Evin for her work advocating against the death penalty and for women's rights. Awarded the 2023 Nobel Peace Prize.
- Nazanin Zaghari-Ratcliffe – British-Iranian dual national, arrested in 2016, held in Evin, and released in 2022.
- Kylie Moore-Gilbert – Australian academic, arrested in 2018 on espionage charges, imprisoned in Evin until 2020.
- Siamak Namazi – Iranian-American businessman, arrested in 2015, detained in Evin until 2022.
- Olivier Vandecasteele – Belgian aid worker, arrested in 2022 on espionage charges, detained in Evin, and released in 2023.
- Johan Floderus – Swedish diplomat, arrested in 2022, detained in Evin, and released in 2024.
- Emad Sharghi – Iranian-American businessman, arrested in 2018, imprisoned in Evin, and released in 2022.
- Cecilia Sala – Italian journalist, arrested in 2024 for reporting, held in solitary confinement in Evin, and released in 2025.
- Zeynab Jalalian – Kurdish women's rights activist, arrested in 2008, sentenced to life in Evin Prison.
- Zahra Bahrami – Arrested in 2010 during protests, she was executed in Evin Prison on drug-related charges in 2011.
- Shane Bauer and Sarah Shourd – Held during the 2009–2011 detention of American hikers by Iran.
- Nasser Fahimi – Kurdish political activist arrested in 1998, held in Evin and later imprisoned for his activism.
- Alireza Farshi – Azerbaijani-Turk activist, arrested in 2014, detained in Evin, and released in 2023.
- Kasra Nouri – Sufi activist arrested in 2018, detained in Evin, sentenced to 12 years for religious activities.
- Nargess Eskandari-Grünberg – Arrested for women's rights activism, detained in Evin before fleeing to Germany in 1985.
- Ali Saremi – Political dissident, arrested in 2009, detained in Evin, and executed in 2010.
- Morad Tahbaz – Iranian-American environmentalist, arrested in 2018, held in Evin, and released in 2022.
- Ramin Jahanbegloo – Iranian-Canadian philosopher, arrested in 2006, held in Evin, and released the same year.
- Mohsen Mirdamadi – Iranian reformist politician, arrested in 2009 following the presidential election protests, held in Evin, and released in 2014.
- Ramin Parchami – Iranian actor, arrested during the 2009 protests, held in Evin, and later released.
- Maziar Bahari – Iranian-Canadian journalist and filmmaker, arrested in 2009, held in Evin, and released later that year.
- Yousef Emadi – Iranian musician and producer, arrested in 2013, held in Evin, and later released.
- Nasim Soltanbeygi – Iranian journalist, held in Evin at various points between 2007 and 2024.
- Xiyue Wang – American academic who was imprisoned from 2016 to 2019.
- Nasrin Javadi – Iranian trade unionist, detained at Evin from 2022 until she was transferred to Qarchak Prison following the Israeli strikes on Evin prison in 2025.
- Robert Bruchim (known in Iran by the pseudonym Milad Darwish) – German-Iranian Jewish journalist, documentary filmmaker and trade union activist. Between 2012 and 2015, he was repeatedly detained in Iran and imprisoned in Evin Prison, including in Ward 209, Ward 2-A, and later Ward 8.
- Maryam Zaree – Iranian-German actress, film director and screenwriter; born in Evin in 1983.

== See also ==
- 1988 executions of Iranian political prisoners
- 2010 Iranian political prisoners' hunger strike for prisoners' rights
- 2011 executions in Iran
- Political repression in the Islamic Republic of Iran
- Human rights in Iran
- Judicial system of Iran
- List of prisons in Iran
- White torture in Iran
- White Torture (book)
- Sednaya Prison

== Bibliography ==
- Abrahamian, Ervand (1999). Tortured confessions: prisons and public recantations in modern Iran. University of California Press. ISBN 978-0-520-21866-6.
