= Marzieh Rasouli =

Iranian journalist

- Persian: مرضیه رسولی
- Occupation: Journalist

Marzieh Rasouli (Persian: مرضیه رسولی) is an Iranian journalist who writes about culture and the arts for several of Iran's reformist and independent publications. In 2012 the Iranian authorities arrested her and accused her of collaborating with the BBC. In 2014 she was convicted of "spreading propaganda" and "disturbing the public order". Sentenced to two years in prison and 50 lashes, she was taken to Evin prison on July 8, 2014. PEN International called for her "immediate and unconditional" release. Marzieh Rasouli's sentence was reduced on appeal to one year in prison, and on October 19, 2014, she was released from prison.

== Journalism ==
Prior to her imprisonment, Rasouli wrote on culture and the arts for reformist publications. Her work appeared in Shargh, where she edited the newspaper's music pages, and in other reformist newspapers including Etemaad and Roozegar. She also has a blog titled 3rouzpish (Three Days Ago).

== Arrest, conviction, and imprisonment ==
Rasouli was arrested at her Tehran home in January 2012 during the run-up to Iranian parliamentary elections. It was reported that the accusation on the arrest warrant was "acting against national security". She was held for six weeks in solitary confinement in Tehran's Evin prison. Prior to the release of Rasouli and two other leading women journalists who had also been arrested the same month, the Iranian Revolutionary Guards' Cyber-Crimes website Gerdab published a statement accusing them of "collaborating with the BBC, British intelligence and the foreign-based opposition." The satellite-broadcast BBC Persian Television service is banned in Iran.

On February 27, 2012, Rasouli was released on a bail of 2 billion Iranian Rials ($300,000). PEN International reported that Rasouli was "briefly detained in January 2013, together with 18 other journalists working for reformist media outlets."

In July 2014, she was convicted of "spreading propaganda" against the Iranian regime and "disturbing public order". Sentenced to two years imprisonment and 50 lashes, she returned to Evin to begin serving her sentence on July 8, 2014. On July 16, 2014, citing Article 19 of the International Covenant on Civil and Political Rights, to which Iran is a party, PEN issued a call for the "immediate and unconditional release" of Rasouli and "all other writers currently similarly detained in Iran in connection with their peaceful exercise of their right to freedom of expression and assembly". PEN also called for Rasouli's sentence of 50 lashes to be "overturned immediately as it violates the absolute prohibition in international law against torture and other cruel, inhuman or degrading treatment or punishment."

Among the personalities who called for the journalist's release and denounced the Iranian regime was Noam Chomsky.
