= Alireza Shir Mohammad Ali =

Iranian political prisoner (1998–2019)

- علیرضا شیرمحمدعلی
- Born: 1998; Tehran, Iran
- Died: 10 June 2019 (aged 20–21); Greater Tehran Central Penitentiary, Iran
- Cause of death: stabbed

Alireza Shir Mohammad Ali (Persian: علیرضا شیرمحمدعلی) was an Iranian political prisoner at the Greater Tehran Central Penitentiary (Fashafoyeh Prison). Ali was killed while in prison by the prisoners that were housed in general population on 10 June 2019.

== Arrest ==
Alireza Shir Mohammad Ali was arrested after massive anti-government protests in 2018. He was subsequently sentenced to eight years in prison on charges of “blasphemy, insulting the former and current leader, and propaganda against the regime”. In March 2018, he went on a month-long hunger strike with another prisoner, Barzan Mohammadi, protesting terrible conditions and heavy restrictions at the Tehran Central Penitentiary.

== Death ==
On 10 June 2019, Shir Mohammad Ali was “attacked by two non-political prisoners and stabbed in the neck and stomach and died before arriving at the hospital.”

== International reaction ==
Human Rights Watch called for an urgent investigation by Iran's judicial authorities to determine whether the role of a lack of oversight or neglect by Fashafoyeh Prison authorities contributed to the murder of Shir Mohammad Ali.

On 13 June 2019, Amnesty International responded to the murder of Shir Mohammad Ali, a prisoner of conscience, and called on Iranian authorities to identify any state failings that contributed to his death and to remedy them.

== See also ==
- Human rights in the Islamic Republic of Iran
- Greater Tehran Central Penitentiary
