= Nasser Fahimi =

Human rights defender, prisoner

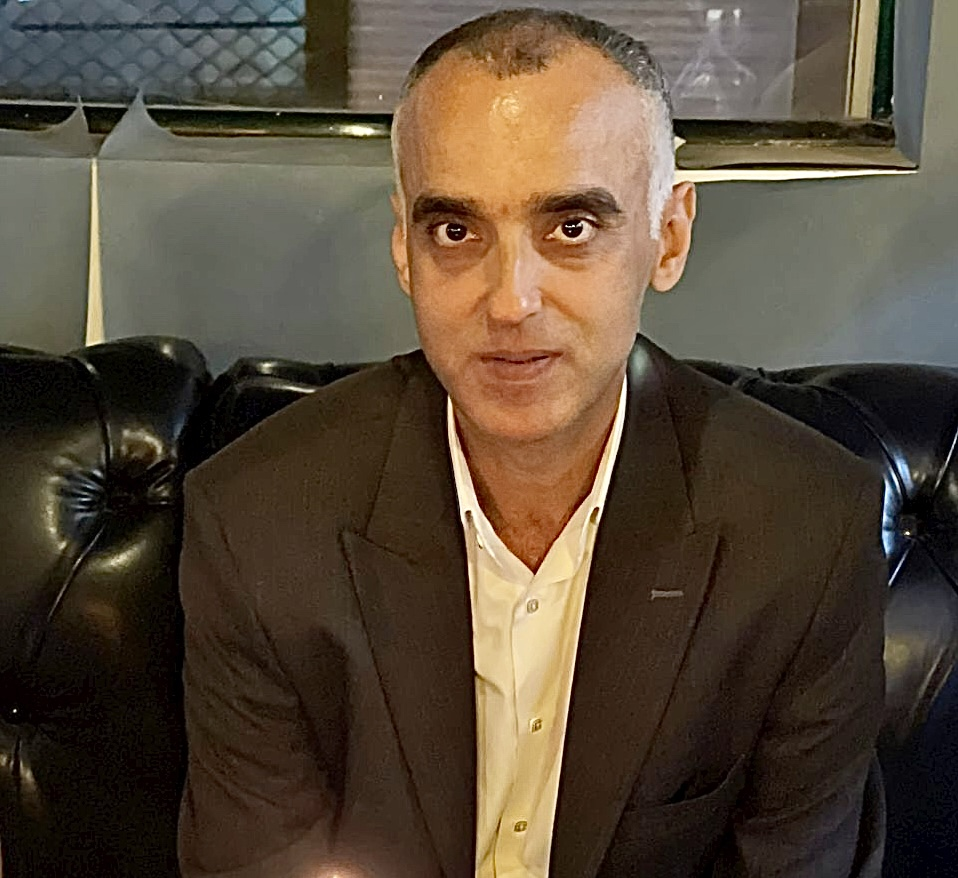
- Nasser Fahimi in 2023
- Born: May 8, 1974 (age 52); Sanandaj, Kurdistan Province, Iran
- Occupations: Physician, Human rights defender
- Years active: 1998 to present
- Organization(s): Membership in the American Iranian Medical Association IDO-IAMA and the Weill Cornell Medical Universities Association APLU NAICU-Médecins Sans Frontières
- Known for: Human rights activism; being the first figure in the political history of Iran to request revocation of Iranian citizenship

Nasser Fahimi (Persian: ناصر فهیمی) is an Iranian physician, human rights defender, and a political prisoner of conscience. He is also the first figure in the political history of Iran who formally requested the Islamic Republic to revoke his Iranian citizenship due to its type of government (a dictatorship).

== Early life ==
Nasser Fahimi was born on May 8, 1974, in Sanandaj, Kurdistan province of Iran.

== Activity ==
In an open letter addressed to the High Commissioner for Human Rights, Verónica Michelle Bachelet, and the President of the United States, Joe Biden, he called for the intensification of human rights condemnations against the Islamic Republic.

== Arrest and imprisonment ==
He was first arrested in 1998 during the protests aimed at condemning the supporting actions of the Turkish government for Abdullah Ocalan. Also, in 2010, after 21 days of being arrested in an unknown place, he was transferred to jail 209.

He was also sentenced to 10 years in prison in 2014, by Abolqasem Salavati on the charge of "administration of opposition groups". In 2015, he was sentenced to six months in prison and 74 lashes on the charge of "insulting judicial authorities". He has also been imprisoned in Fashafouyeh Prison for one year where he was also denied access to medical services.

== Cancellation of citizenship ==
In a message to Ali Khamenei, the Supreme Leader and Hassan Rouhani, the President of Iran, Fahimi requested the judiciary to revoke his official citizenship due to the regime's dictatorship.
