= Nasim Soltanbeygi =

Iranian journalist

- نسیم سلطان‌بیگی
- Citizenship: Iran
- Occupation: Journalist
- Known for: Reporting on the Mahsa Amini protests
- Criminal charges: colluding and assembling against national security spreading propaganda
- Criminal penalty: Three years' imprisonment
- Criminal status: Released

Nasim Soltanbeygi (Persian: نسیم سلطان‌بیگی) is an Iranian journalist. She served three-and-a-half years in prison for her reporting on the Mahsa Amini protests.

== Career ==
Soltanbeygi is a freelance journalist who has reported on politics, social issues and human rights news for Iranian news outlets including the state-run reformist newspaper Shargh and Peace Mark. She also posts regularly on the social media outlets including X and Instagram.

During the Mahsa Amini protests, Soltanbeygi contacted foreign journalists to share information about what was happening, including authorities' clampdown on protesters.

== Criminal charges ==
=== 2006 arrest and trial ===
On 12 June 2006, Soltanbeygi was arrested during a women's rights demonstration in Haft-e Tir Square. Following nine days of solitary confinement in Evin Prison, she was released on bail. On 15 September 2007, Soltanbeygi was given a two-year suspended sentence from branch 15 of the Islamic Revolutionary Court for "illegal assembly" and "conspiracy against national security".

=== 2007 arrest, trial and sentence ===
On 3 December 2007, Soltanbeygi was arrested during a student rally and spent 56 days in detention, including 40 days in solitary confinement, before being released on bail. On 30 November 2010, she was sentenced to six years imprisonment; upon appeal, the year-long sentence for "propaganda against the regime" was acquitted with two years suspended, and her three-year sentence for "activities against national security" were upheld. She began serving her sentence on 13 October 2012 at Evin Prison; after one year, she was pardoned and released.

Mistreatment in custody was later attributed to Soltanbeygi developing epilepsy.

=== 2023 arrest, trial and sentence ===
On 11 January 2023, Soltanbeygi was arrested at Imam Khomeini International Airport in Tehran while boarding an international flight. Her personal items, including a laptop, phone and luggage were seized, and she was taken to an undisclosed location. Soltanbeygi was subsequently permitted to make a phone call and informed her mother that she had been arrested.

After initially being held in solitary confinement in Evin Prison in Tehran, on 7 February 2023, Soltanbeygi was temporarily released on bail, under the supervision of the Islamic Revolutionary Guard Corps' intelligence unit, after paying a 10 billion IRR bail. In May 2023, the prosecutor issued an indictment against Soltanbeygi for "the most severe punishment" after she did not collaborate with officers during several interrogations held that month.

In August 2023, Soltanbeygi was sentenced to three years and six months in prison for "colluding and assembling against national security" and an additional eight months "spreading propaganda against the system" by Judge Iman Afshari at branch 26 of the Islamic Revolutionary Court, in response to her coverage of the Mahsa Amini protests. She was also subjected to a two-year ban on leaving Iran or joining a political group or assembly. Soltanbeygi appealed her sentence, which was ultimately upheld. The appeal, by branch 36 of the Islamic Revolutionary Court, also confirmed that Soltanbeygi would not be eligible for the amnesty issued in February 2023 to mark the 44th anniversary of the Iranian Revolution.

On 21 November 2023, Soltanbeygi was arrested again after she responded to a court summons at branch 1 of the Islamic Revolutionary Court to begin her sentence. She was transferred to Evin Prison.

=== Release ===
On 10 March 2024, Soltanbeygi was temporarily released from prison on medical furlough due to several health issues including insomnia upon the recommendation of the Forensic Medical Commission. She subsequently returned to prison.

On 20 September 2025, the Forensic Medical Commission confirmed that the remainder of Soltanbeygi's sentence had been suspended under the General Pardon and Sentence Reduction Directive of 2025, based on its recommendations.

The United Nations Special Rapporteur on Human Rights in Iran expressed "profound concern" at Soltanbeygi's conviction, stating it was linked to her "peaceful human rights activism"; it also expressed worry about the impact the sentence would have on her health.

Front Line Defenders condemned the "judicial harassment" of Soltanbeygi by Iranian authorities and called it a "reprisal" for her human rights activism.

== Recognition ==
In 2024, Soltanbeygi was announced as the winner of Index on Censorship's Freedom of Expression Awards in the journalism category for bringing the world "the most important stories out of her country" in an "incredibly challenging environment".
