= Ramin Parchami =

Iranian actor

- رامین پرچمی
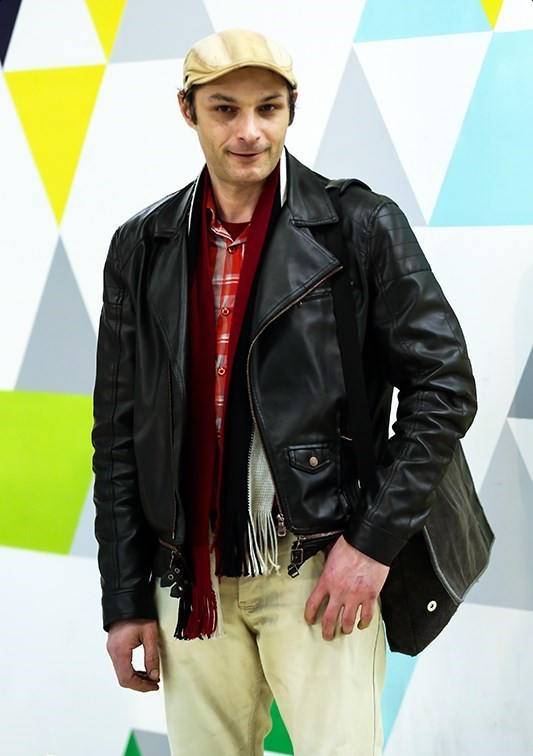
- Parchami at the 36th Fajr Film Festival
- Born: September 18, 1973 (age 52); Lahijan, Gilan, Iran
- Education: Islamic Azad University
- Occupation: Actor

Ramin Parchami (Persian: رامین پرچمی; born September 18, 1973) is an Iranian actor in cinema, theater, and television. In 2011, he was arrested during the Green Movement protests in Tehran and imprisoned for several months in Evin Prison.

== Education ==
Ramin Parchami holds a master's degree in directing and acting in theater from the Islamic Azad University.

== Career ==
In addition to acting, Parchami directed a short film titled *The Solution*. He began his acting career with the TV series Dar Panahe To and the film Ziyafat. He also worked as the editor-in-chief of the cultural-artistic weekly *Naghshe Afarinan* for a period.

He became famous for his roles in television series such as Dar Panahe To, After the Rain, Neighbors, Under the Sky of the City 3, and films like Ziyafat, Eteraz, Telephone, Gray, Maman's Guest, and Ekhrajiha 2.

== Political activity ==
During the 2011 Iranian protests (Green Movement), Parchami was arrested on February 14, 2011, in Tehran and transferred to Evin Prison. After several months in prison, he was temporarily released on March 18, 2012, to carry out administrative procedures, which was kept out of media at his request to avoid administrative complications.

Finally, on July 29, 2012, with Parchami's consent, his release was publicly announced.

On April 20, 2011, it was announced that Parchami had been sentenced by Branch 13 of the Islamic Revolutionary Court of Tehran to one year of imprisonment for acting against national security by participating in illegal gatherings, filming, and disturbing public order.

== Filmography ==
=== Films ===
Year	Title	Director	Role
1995	Ziyafat	Masoud Kimiai	Javad
1999	Telephone	Shafi Agha Mohammadian	
1999	Eteraz	Masoud Kimiai	Mojtaba Pouladi
2000	Gray	Mehrdad Mirfatah	
2003	Maman's Guest	Dariush Mehrjui	Construction worker
2008	Ekhrajiha 2	Masoud Dehnamaki	Christian soldier
2017	Crocodile	Masoud Takavar	
2018	At the Time of Divorce	Hassan Hajgozar	
2022	Non-Actor	Hamidreza Sangiyan	

=== Television series ===
Year	Title	Director	Role
1995	Dar Panahe To	Hamid Labkhandeh	Ramin
1996	Goriz	Karim Atashi	
1996	Final Step	Reza Tavakoli	
1997	Return of the Swallows	Abolghasem Talebi	
1998	Ghesse Zendegi	Sirous Kashaninejad	
1999	Youthful Days	Asghar Tavasoli	
1999	After the Rain	Saeed Soltani	Firooz
2000	Neighbors	Mohammad Hossein Latifi	
2000	A Voice in Golestan	Ramin Lebaschi	
2000	Road to Home	Hamidreza Madanchi	
2001	House of Wishes	Hossein Soheilizadeh	
2001	Family Restaurant	Hossein Soheilizadeh	Guest actor
2002	Under the Sky of the City (Season 3)	Mehran Ghafourian	Guest actor
2004	Lost Love	Hossein Soheilizadeh	
2004	Elephant Keepers	Kazem Rastgoftar	
2005	And God Created Love	Masoud Shah Mohammadi	Guest actor

=== Play reading ===
- The Fate of Passionate Lovers (2013)
