= Israeli strikes on Evin prison =

2025 attack in Tehran, Iran

- Part of the Twelve-Day War and the Middle Eastern crisis (2023–present)
- Location within Iran
- Location: Evin Prison in Tehran, Iran
- Date: 23 June 2025
- Attack type: Airstrikes
- Deaths: 80
- Perpetrator: Israel Defense Forces

On 23 June 2025, Israel struck Evin Prison in Tehran, Iran, marking the deadliest attack during the Twelve-Day War. Within hours of the attack, the Israeli government took responsibility for the strike.

According to the Iranian government, 80 people were killed in the strikes, with dozens wounded, including prison guards, prisoners, family members visiting.

== Context ==
The attack came on the second-to-last day of the Israeli-Iranian war. Iranian casualties during the war numbered over 1,100 deaths according to official sources. Israeli official sources reported at least 29 deaths. Both totals included civilians, women, and children. In a social media post Israeli Foreign Affairs Minister Gideon Sa’ar framed the attack on Evin prison as "our response" to Iranian attacks on Israeli civilians.

At the time of the strike, there were some 1,500 to 2,000 prisoners held at Evin prison. According to Amnesty International, prisoners at Evin included "arbitrarily detained human rights defenders, protesters, political dissidents, members of persecuted religious minorities, and dual and foreign nationals frequently held for diplomatic leverage." The daytime strike came during visiting hours and visitors and those filing administrative paperwork were among the casualties.

== Damages and casualties ==
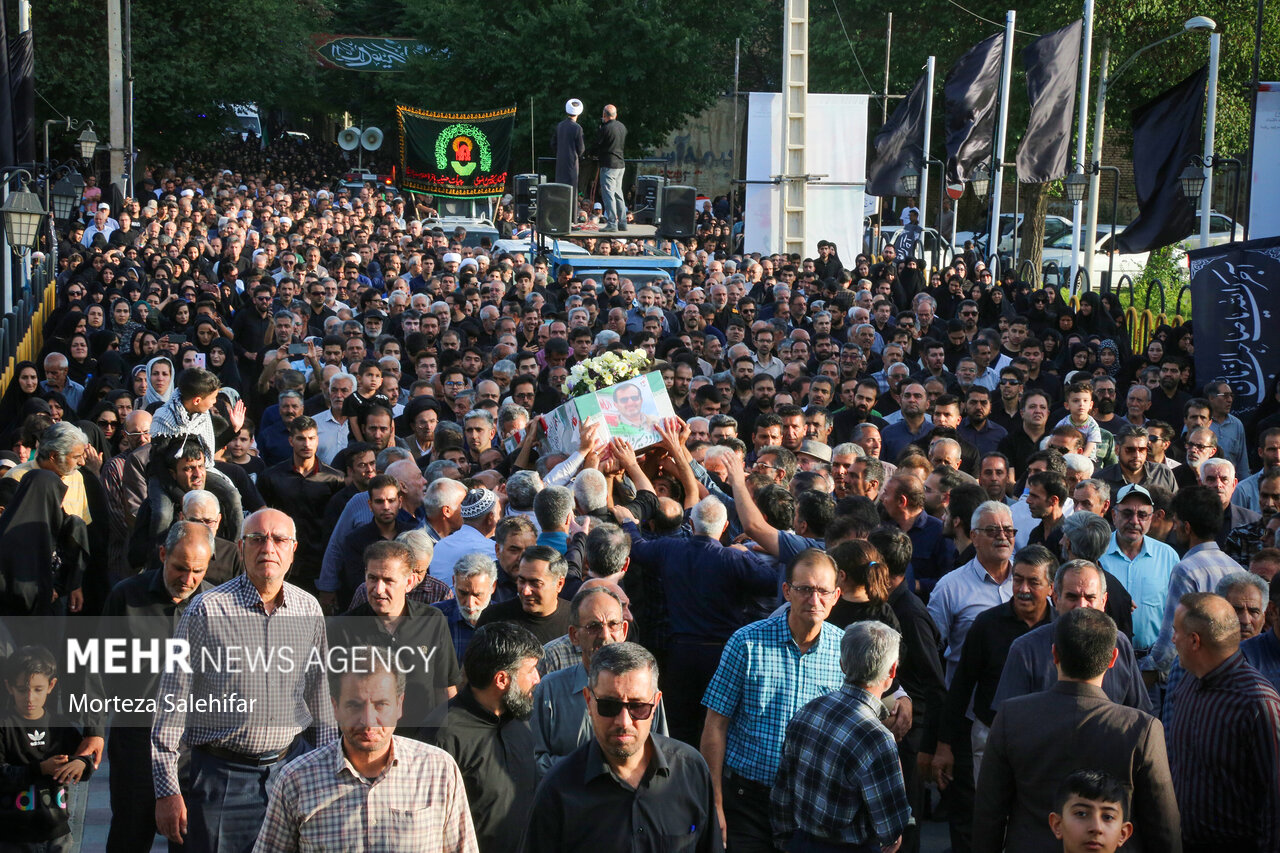
Funeral of Davood Shirvani, Iranian physician killed in Israeli airstrike on Evin Prison.

The Israeli strikes that occurred during visiting hours, caused extensive damage to the prison, including the destruction of the library, the prisoners' meeting area, the clinic, the prosecutor's office, and several prison cells, which were severely damaged, according to human rights groups and relatives of prisoners. One of the missiles hit the entrance to the prison, where prisoners often wait to be transferred to the hospital or court.

According to Iranian media, activists and human rights groups, among the dead and injured were family members of prisoners, social workers, a lawyer, doctors and nurses, a 5-year-old child, teenage soldiers guarding the doors as part of their compulsory military service, administrative staff and residents of the area. Among those killed were prisoner Masoud Behbahani, an Iranian-American national, and well-known artist and nearby resident Mehrangiz Imanpour. Iranian government reports stated that 42 of those killed were prison staff and five were prisoners.

The attack was the deadliest in the conflict. Surviving political prisoners were transferred to other prisons, such as Nasrin Javadi who in July was moved to Qarchak Prison.

Shortly after the explosions occurred at Evin Prison, a video surfaced on X and Telegram featuring the hashtag "#freeevin". The content of the posts and videos seemed to lack authenticity. According to the researchers, these videos were allegedly part of an "Israeli deception".

The New York Times did originally report on 6 July 2025 in an article by Farnaz Fassihi and two other authors, that after the attack some 100 transgender individuals were missing, who had been imprisoned in Evin. Later research, conducted by journalists of the German TAZ and the BBC Persian Service, could not confirm that statement. After contacting the New York Times Iranian source Reza Shafakhah, the lawyer denied ever making that claim in his call with Fassihi. After his account, he had no idea if transgender people were missing after the attack or how many transgender people are imprisoned in Iran. He suggested, Fassihi wanted to contradict Israeli public statements with a dramatic reveal for publicity reasons. Human Rights Watch reported that the strikes damaged "the main quarantine section, where transgender prisoners were held" as well as a number of sections where national security and activist detainees were held.

== Reactions ==
Airstrikes on Evin Prison, including the hospital wing, sparked widespread condemnation and anger in Iran, even among opponents of the government. Nobel Peace Prize laureate Narges Mohammadi, Iran's human rights activist, said that the Israeli attack "carried out in broad daylight, in front of families and visitors, is clearly a war crime." Mohammadi spent decades commuting to and from Evin and was on leave in July 2025.

The Israel Defense Forces refused to comment on the reason for the attack on Evin or the victims. The attack on Evin has been described by Israeli officials as "symbolic". Foreign Minister Gideon Sa'ar said in a social media post that this was both revenge for Iran's missile attacks and a form of liberating action.

Amnesty International warned that "Deliberately attacking civilian objects is prohibited under international humanitarian law and would amount to a war crime".

The French foreign minister said the attack on the prison was "unacceptable" because it put the lives of two French citizens held there at risk.

Thameen Al-Kheetan, a spokesperson for the UN High Commissioner for Human Rights, called the attack "a grave breach of international humanitarian law."

Bahar Ghandehari, Director of the Human Rights Protection Department at the Iran Center for Human Rights, condemned Israel's attack on a place protected by international humanitarian law. She dismissed Israel's justification for the attack as a symbolic act, calling it "legally baseless" and "morally reprehensible". She said "Israel's calculated attack on Evin constitutes a blatant war crime and a serious breach of international law. It must be held fully accountable."

In October 2025, a Citizen Lab report found that a network of 50 fake accounts on X (Twitter) purporting to be Iranian residents near the prison had posted AI-generated and/or manipulated content that called for people to storm the prison in the aftermath of the strikes as part of an anti-government uprising. Based in part on the high production value of one of the videos and the release shortly after the strikes, Citizen Lab concluded that the network was mostly likely either directly run by an Israeli government agency or through contractors with advance knowledge of the strikes.

Human Rights Watch condemned the attack, stating that it was "unlawfully indiscriminate" and an apparent "war crime".

On 13 March 2026, Sara Hossain, the head of the Independent International Fact-Finding Mission on Iran considered that the strike as a war crime, stating to the United Nations Human Rights Council, "We found reasonable grounds to believe that, in carrying out the airstrikes on Evin prison, Israel committed the war crime of intentionally directing attacks against a civilian object."

== See also ==
- List of massacres in Iran
- List of attacks during the Twelve-Day War
- Israeli war crimes
