= Bidokht =

City in Razavi Khorasan province, Iran

Bidokht Persian: بيدخت
- City
- Location within Iran
- Coordinates: 34°20′52″N 58°45′23″E
- Country: Iran
- Province: Razavi Khorasan
- County: Gonabad
- District: Central

Population (2016)
  - Total: 5,501
- Time zone: UTC+3:30 (IRST)

Bidokht (Persian: بيدخت) (Note: Also romanized as Beydokht and Bīdokht; also known as Bidukh) is a city in the Central District of Gonabad County, Razavi Khorasan province, Iran. It is 270 kilometres (170 mi) south of Mashhad.

== Demographics ==
=== Population ===
At the time of the 2006 National Census, the city's population was 4,823 in 1,392 households. The following census in 2011 counted 5,348 people in 1,597 households. The 2016 census measured the population of the city as 5,501 people in 1,719 households.

== Overview ==
Bidokht is the seat of the Gonabadi Sufi order. In the center of the town stands Mazār-e Solṭāni, hosting the mausoleum of Solṭān-Alishāh. It is also the burial place of Solṭān-Ḥoseyn (Sultan Hussein) Tābandeh Reżā-Alishāh, (Ali Tabandeh) Maḥbub-Alishāh and Noor Ali Tabandeh Majzoob-Alishāh. In 1979 Islamic revolutionary bands desecrated the mausoleum complex.
