= Nasrin Javadi =

Iranian human rights activist (born 1958)

- نسرین جوادی
- Born: 1958 (age 67–68); Pahlavi Iran
- Citizenship: Iran
- Occupation: Trade unionist
- Organization: Social Security Retirees' Labour Council
- Criminal charges: Assembly and collusion against national security Propaganda against the state Disrupting public order
- Criminal penalty: 7 years imprisonment
- Criminal status: Released

Nasrin Javadi (Persian: نسرین جوادی; born c. 1958), also known as Azam Khazri Javadi (اعظم خضری جوادی), is an Iranian human rights activist. She became a trade unionist after retiring from her job as a medical equipment distribution worker, and was a member of the Free Union of Iranian Workers, as well as a founding member of the Social Security Retirees' Labour Council. Javadi was imprisoned for her activism between 2022 and 2025.

== Biography ==
Javadi worked for a medical equipment distribution company before retiring and receiving a pension from the Social Security Organization. She first began her activism when she joined the 40, 000 Signatures campaign to increase the minimum wage in Iran. In addition to joining the Free Union of Iranian Workers, she also co-founded the Social Security Retirees' Labour Council, a trade union dedicated to promoting the rights of retired workers in Iran.

== Arrest, trial and imprisonment ==
On 1 May 2019, Javadi was arrested while taking part in a protest in front of the Islamic Consultative Assembly in Tehran to mark International Workers' Day. She was detained at Qarchak Prison in Varamin until being released on bail on 30 May.

On 6 August 2019, branch 26 of the Islamic Revolutionary Court in Tehran sentenced Javadi to seven years' imprisonment on three charges. This included five years for "assembly and collusion against national security"; one year for "propaganda against the state"; and one year and 74 lashes for "disrupting public order". She was also banned for two years from using smartphones and taking part in social and political activities. Javadi appealed the sentence; on 6 May 2020, branch 36 of the Court of Appeal upheld her conviction for assembly and collusion, but acquitted her of the other charges. Human rights groups stated that Javadi's conviction was linked to her activism for labour rights.

Javadi was ordered to start her sentence in June 2020, however this was delayed after her lawyer requested a waiver on medical grounds due to Javadi's "deteriorating health conditions", including osteoporosis, a herniated disc, and significant hearing loss in one ear. Javadi's lawyer stated that the Forensic Medicine Organisation had assessed her as being "physically unfit for incarceration". On 1 July 2022, Javadi was summoned to begin serving her sentence at Evin Prison in Tehran.

During Javadi's imprisonment, it was reported that she had developed several medical issues due to "essential medical care" not being provided to her. She spent at least 50 days in solitary confinement. In October 2022, Javadi was among a group of 13 prisoners at Evin Prison who were charged with "disturbing public order and comfort, assembly and collusion against the regime, insulting officials and defying prison guards" by branch 3 of the Evin Prosecutor's Office after they refused to wear handcuffs while being transported to court. In 2025, Javadi co-authored an open letter alongside fellow political prisoners Anisha Asadollahi and Nahid Khodabakhashi stating that "wars will never benefit the people. It's the people - who had no role in starting these wars - who always pay the price".

In July 2025, Javadi and other political prisoners were transferred to Qarchak Prison following the Israeli strikes on Evin Prison.

== Release ==
On 15 September 2025, Javadi was released from Qarchak Prison after serving three years on the basis of "old age". She was photographed upon her release holding a sign saying "no to execution" (نه به اعدام, na bah edam). Javadi was released alongside three other human rights activists held at Qarchak.
