= Mahmoud Nili Ahmadabadi =

Professor of metallurgy

Mahmoud Nili Ahmadabadi محمود نیلی احمدآبادی
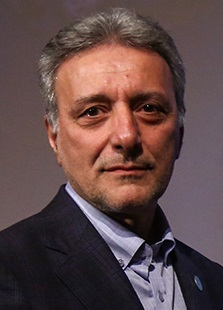
- Nili in 2019
- Born: 1956 (age 69–70); Isfahan, Iran
- Education: Shiraz University; Sharif University; Tohoku University
- Occupation: Professor
- Website: Official website

Mahmoud Nili Ahmadabadi (Persian: محمود نیلی احمدآبادی; born 1956) is a professor of metallurgy at the University of Tehran, who served as the President of University of Tehran from 2014 to 2021. He is former head of the Center for Excellence for Higher Performance Material at the University of Tehran. In October 2021, the then president of the University of Tehran, Mahmoud Nili Ahmadabadi, wrote a letter to Gholam-Hossein Mohseni-Eje'i, the head of the Islamic Republic's judiciary, demanding the release of Kasra Nouri, a student prisoner, and a day later the president of the University of Tehran was fired.

== Education and career ==
Mahmoud Nili Ahmadabadi, or Mahmoud Nili, was born in 1956 in Isfahan, Iran. After obtaining a BSc degree from University of Shiraz in 1982, he started working for revolutionary institutes. Seven years later, he obtained an MSc degree from Sharif University of Technology and went to Japan to study at in Tohoku University. Mahmoud Nili has written more than 70 scholarly articles.

== See also ==
- University of Tehran
- Kasra Nouri

Academic offices
| Preceded by Farhad Rahbar | Chancellor of University of Tehran; 2014–2021 | Succeeded by Mohammad Moghimi |
