= Margherita Guidacci =

Italian poet (1921–1992)

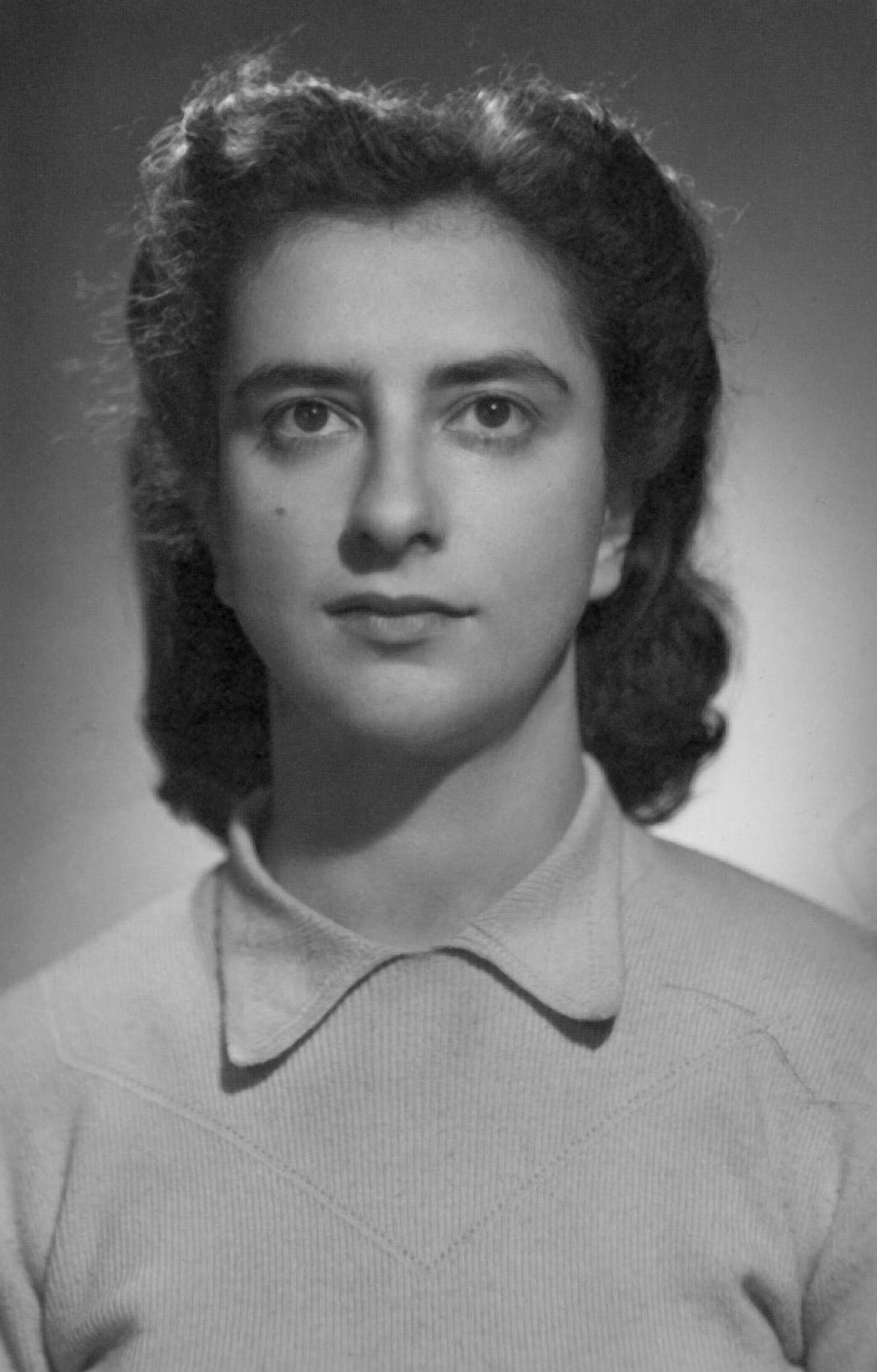
- Guidacci in the 1940s
- Born: 25 April 1921; Florence, Italy
- Died: 19 June 1992 (aged 71); Rome, Italy
- Education: University of Florence (1943)
- Occupation: Poet
- Spouse: Luca Pinna (m. 1949; died 1977)
- Writing career
- Period: 1950–1992
- Notable works: Translations of Emily Dickinson, T. S. Eliot and Elizabeth Bishop; Introducing the word paparazzi in English
- Notable awards: Biella Poesia Award 1978 Il vuoto e le forme; Caserta Prize 1987 (complete works)

Margherita Guidacci (Italian pronunciation: [marɡeˈriːta ɡwiˈdattʃi]; 25 April 1921 – 19 June 1992) was an Italian poet.

== Early life and career ==
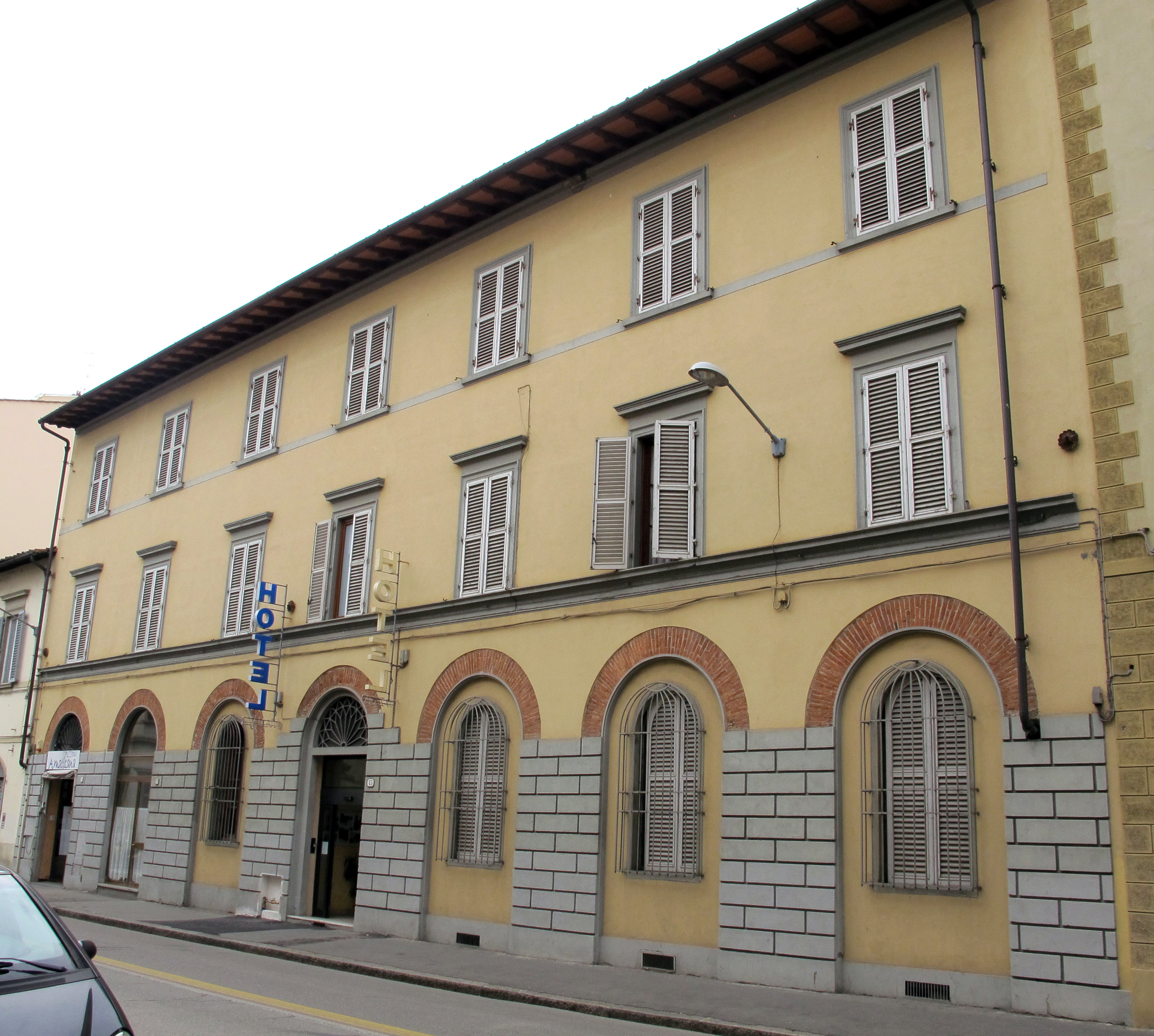
House where Margherita Guidacci lived, located at Via della Mattonaia 43 in Florence

Born in Florence, Guidacci graduated from the University of Florence in 1943 and traveled to England and Ireland in 1947.

After moving to Rome upon marriage, the poet taught English language and literature at the Liceo scientifico Cavour for ten years, from 1965 to 1975. Guidacci obtained the libera docenza ("free teaching") in the English language and literature in 1972, and from 1975 to 1981, she taught English and American Literature at the University of Macerata and the College of Maria Assunta attached to the Vatican.

== Poetry and translations ==
The poetry of Margherita Guidacci is deeply spiritual but not in the religious sense. Rather her poems include profound sentiments and a view of life as a search for regeneration and resurrection from death. Guidacci regarded life as a passage and its desolation and pain a means toward transformation beyond death.

Guidacci is noted for her Italian translations of English poets, including John Donne's sermons and Emily Dickinson's poetry. T. S. Eliot and Elizabeth Bishop are among other poets Guidacci translated into her native language.

=== Literary awards ===
In 1978, Guidacci was awarded the Biella Poesia literary prize for her collection Il vuoto e le forme. Guidacci traveled to the United States in 1986, and was the recipient of the 1987 Caserta Prize for her complete works. Among literary prizes Guidacci was awarded are: Carducci Prize, 1957; Ceppo Prize, 1971; Lerici Prize, 1972; Gabbici Prize, 1974; Seanno Prize, 1976.

=== Paparazzi ===
The English usage of the word paparazzi is credited to Margherita Guidacci's translation of Victorian writer George Gissing's travel book By the Ionian Sea (1901). A character in Margherita Guidacci's Sulle Rive dello Ionio (1957) is a restaurant-owner named Coriolano Paparazzo. The name was in turn chosen by Ennio Flaiano, the screenwriter of the Federico Fellini film, La Dolce Vita, who got it from Guidacci's book. By the late 1960s, the word, usually in the Italian plural form paparazzi, had entered the English lexicon as a generic term for intrusive photographers.

== Personal life ==
Guidacci married the sociologist Luca Pinna in 1949. In 1957, they moved to Rome. Her husband died in 1977, and she continued to live in Rome until her death in 1992.

== Published works ==
- Guidacci, Margherita (1946). La sabbia e l'angelo [The Sand and the Angel] (in Italian). Florence: Vallecchi.
- Guidacci, Margherita (1954). Morte del ricco: un oratorio (in Italian). Florence: Vallecchi.
- Guidacci, Margherita (1957). Giorno dei santi (in Italian). Milan: Libri Scheiwiller.
- Guidacci, Margherita (1961). Paglia e polvere (in Italian). Padua: Rebellato.
- Guidacci, Margherita (1965). Poesie (in Italian). Milan: Rizzoli.
- Guidacci, Margherita (1970). Un cammino incerto (in Italian). Luxembourg: Cahiers d'Origine.
- Guidacci, Margherita (1970). Neurosuite (in Italian). Vicenza: Neri Pozza.
- Terra senza orologi, Milan, Edizioni Trentadue, 1973.
- Taccuino slavo, Vicenza, La Locusta, 1976.
- Il vuoto e le forme, Padua, Rebellato, 1977.
- L'altare di Isenheim, Milan, Rusconi, 1980.
- Guidacci, Margherita (1980). Brevi e lunghe: Poesie (Collana letteraria; 5) (in Italian). Vatican City: Libreria Editrice Vaticana. ISBN 978-88-209-1328-1.
- L'orologio di Bologna, Florence, Città di vita, 1981.
- Inno alla gioia, Florence, Centro internazionale del libro, 1983.
- La via crucis dell'umanità, Florence, Città di vita, 1984.
- Liber Fulguralis, Messina, La mea stregata, 1986.
- Poesie per poeti, Milan, Istituto di propaganda libraria, 1987.
- Una breve misura, Chieti, Vecchi faggio editore, 1988.
- Guidacci, Margherita (1989). Il buio e lo splendore (I Garzanti poesia) (in Italian). Milan: Garzanti. ISBN 978-88-11-63905-3.
- Anelli del tempo, Firenze, Città di vita, 1993.
- Guidacci, Margherita (1999). Prose e interviste (Egeria) (in Italian). Editrice C.R.T. ISBN 978-88-87296-62-4.
- Le poesie, ed. Maura Del Serra, Florence 1999; revised and expanded edition, Florence 2020.

=== Translations ===
- Guidacci, Margherita (1989). A Book of Sibyls: Poems. Translated by Ruth Feldman. Rowan Tree Press. ISBN 978-0-937672-26-6.
- Guidacci, Margherita (April 1992). Landscape With Ruins: Selected Poetry of Margherita Guidacci. Translated by Ruth Feldman. Wayne State Univ Pr. ISBN 978-0-8143-2352-6.
- Guidacci, Margherita (2004). Selection of Modern Italian Poetry in Translation. McGill-Queen's University Press. ISBN 0-7735-2697-8.
- Guidacci, Margherita (1993). In the eastern sky: Selected poems of Margherita Guidacci. Dedalus. ISBN 978-1-873790-22-9.
- Guidacci, Margherita (1975). Poems from Neurosuite. Translated by Marina La Palma. Kelsey Street Press.
- Guidacci, Margherita. Le Retable d'Issenheim. ARFUYEN.
- Guidacci, Margherita (1992) [1921]. L'altare di Isenheim. Rusconi, Milano, 1980, Gambetti, 1997.
- Guidacci, Margherita. Isenheimski oltar. Translated from the Italian by Gérard Pfister. Jezik/Language: Croatian.
