= Yousef Emadi =

Yousef Emadi یوسف عمادی
- Born: May 1984; Sari, Iran
- Occupation(s): Composer, Musician, Poet
- Works: The Sky Is Not Blue!

Yousef Emadi (Persian: یوسف عمادی; born May 1984 in Sari) is an Iranian composer, tar and setar player, music researcher, and poet specializing in blank verse (She'r-e Sepid). In 2013, he was arrested on charges related to his musical activities, sentenced to prison for insulting sanctities and propaganda against the regime, and later imprisoned in Evin Prison in Tehran.

== Biography ==
He studied Persian classical music under Ali Yadollahi and later completed advanced traditional music studies under Mohammad Reza Lotfi. After his arrest in 2013, he was forced to suspend his musical and research activities.

== Arrest and Imprisonment ==
On October 5, 2013, Emadi was arrested in Sari and transferred to Ward 2-A of Evin Prison, where he spent one month in solitary confinement. His case was reviewed in 2015 by Branch 28 of the Islamic Revolutionary Court presided over by Judge Mohammad Moghiseh, and he was sentenced to six years imprisonment and a fine on charges of unauthorized artistic activities, insulting sanctities, and propaganda against the regime. On appeal, Branch 54 of the Revolutionary Court reduced the sentence to three years imprisonment and three years suspended imprisonment.

== Imprisonment ==
Since November 2016, Emadi has been held in Ward 7 of Evin Prison.
