= Maryam Shafipour =

Iranian human rights activist

Maryam Shafipour is an Iranian human rights activist. Following seven months of pre-trial detention in Evin Prison, including more than two months in solitary confinement, Shafipour was sentenced in March 2014 to seven years in prison for her political activities. Human rights organization have called for her release and condemned her conviction and prison sentence. She was released in July 2015.

== Biography ==
Shafipour studied water engineering at Imam Khomeini International University in Qazvin. She was a member of the women's committee of Mehdi Karroubi's campaign for president in the June 2009 elections in Iran. The ensuing protests led government authorities to crack down on politically active students that supported reformist candidates Mir-Hossein Mousavi and Karroubi, including banning individuals like Shafipour from pursuing higher education. She was suspended and later expelled from her university in 2010 for political activities including “blogging”, “reporting for local newspapers” and “involving in student movements“ In 2010, Shafipour also received a one-year suspended prison sentence for "spreading propaganda against the system". A suspended sentence is not implemented unless the person is found guilty of another charge.

Her activism also included "advocating for the rights of university students barred from higher education because of their activism and for the release of political prisoners", including Karroubi, and she was a member of “council of define rights of education”, a group established by students who banned to continue their education.

As soon as she was released from prison, she took preliminary steps to launch the campaign of “In Support of Imprisoned Mothers” in coordination with Shirin Ebadi (the Nobel peace prize winner). The campaign started its activities in a gathering in front of the International Court of Justice in The Hague in support of prisoner mothers.

Shafipour was invited by “Noble Women’s Initiative” to take part in a mentorship program as a young woman human rights defender in Canada in August 2016. Since then, she has lived in Canada.

In 2016, she launched the #FreeNarges social media campaign following the unfair verdict of the Iranian judiciary sentencing Narges Mohammadi to 16 years in prison. A number of independent civil rights and human rights activists decided to launch this campaign as part of a concerted effort to support Narges and her goal of eliminating discrimination against Iranian women, and to draw attention to her plight.

== Arrest and detention ==
Appearing before the Evin Prison Court on 27 July 2013 after being summoned, Shafipour was arrested. Transferred to Evin Prison in Tehran, she spent 67 days in solitary confinement during which she was denied access to a lawyer. She was then moved to the prison's general ward, where she spent another five months in pre-trial detention while her case judge refused to release her on bail. During this time, interrogators reportedly "subjected her to psychological and physical abuse, including kicking her."

On 16 September 2013, Shafipour was transferred to a hospital outside the prison for a brief period, though the prison authorities refused to tell her parents why she was sent to the hospital. She had complained to her family earlier about numbness in one of her hands. In December 2013, she reportedly fainted due to the onset of an irregular heartbeat and was taken to the prison medical clinic.

== Trial and sentencing ==
Shafipour's first court hearing was held on 21 October 2013 in Branch 15 of the Revolutionary Court in Tehran. The charges against her included "spreading propaganda against the system." A second court hearing scheduled for 1 January 2014 was postponed due to the absence of the presiding judge.

On 1 March 2014, Branch 28 of Tehran Revolutionary Court informed Shafipour's lawyer that she had been convicted "on charges of 'propaganda against the regime' and 'assembly and collusion against national security,' and sentenced to seven years in prison and two years' ban on 'cyberspace, media, and press activities.'" In July 2015, she was released from Evin prison.

== Reaction ==
Human rights organizations Amnesty International, Human Rights Watch, and the International Campaign for Human Rights in Iran have called for the release of Shafipour and condemned her conviction and prison sentence. Hassiba Hadj Sahraoui, deputy director for the Middle East and North Africa Programme at Amnesty International, stated, "Maryam Shafi' Pour's conviction is a chilling reminder of how little Iran's human rights record has changed since 2009, when students were arrested in droves during post-election unrest."
