= 2018 Iran Dervish protests =

Series of protests in Tehran by an Iranian Sufi group

2018 Dervish protests
- Part of the Iranian Democracy Movement
- Date: 4 February 2018 – 4 March 2018 (1 month)
- Location: Tehran, Iran
- Caused by: Possible arrest of Noor Ali Tabandeh; Several Dervishes arrested
- Goals: -Greater religious freedom, especially for Dervishes
- Methods: Demonstrations, riots
- Status: -Protests Quelled -Continued rise of the Iranian Democracy Movement

Parties
Ni'matullāhī dervishes	Islamic Republic; • Police; • Irgc; • Basij; • Ansar-e Hezbollah

Lead figures
Noor Ali Tabandeh	Ali Khamenei

Number
Hundreds	100+

Casualties
- Deaths: Up to 5 protesters 5 security forces
- Injuries: 170+ protesters 30 security forces
- Arrested: 400+

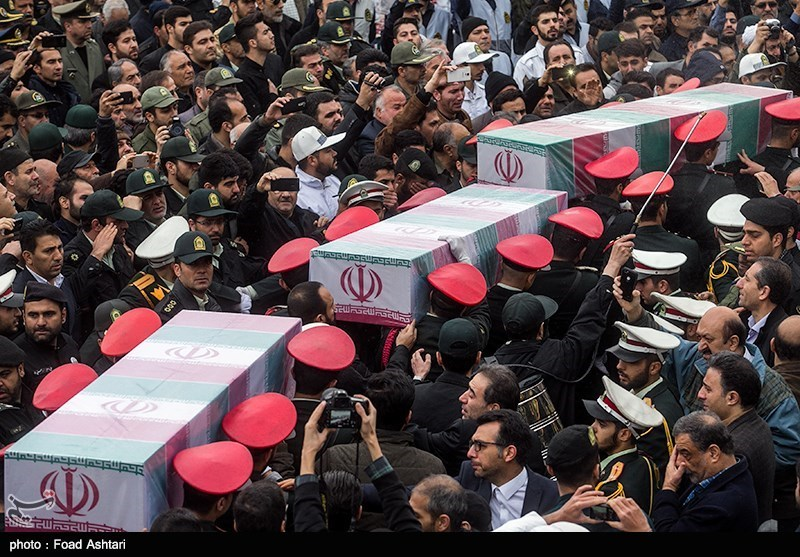
Funerals of policemen who died during the protests, held on 22 February 2018

The 2018 Dervish protests were a series of protests against the Iranian government by the Ni'matullāhī (or Gonabandi) Sufi Order, occurring between February and March 2018 in Tehran. These protests led to clashes between security forces and the dervishes, resulting in the bloody repression of protestors. Tensions between Police, the IRGC, and the Basij with a number of Gonabadi Dervishes eventually led to the deaths of six people, the execution of Dervishes, and the arrest of hundreds of wounded Dervishes on March.

The United States called the repression of the Dervishes the largest repression of religious minorities in the Islamic Republic, while the Ministry of Interior of Iran called the protests a plot to expand its scope to the national level by creating regional unrest.

== Background ==
The Ni'matullāhī, or Gonabandi, are a Sufi order; the Iranian government considers them a threat. Conversion to Sufism is frowned upon by the Shi'a religious establishment.

In January 2012, at least 10 of the group's members were imprisoned in Fars province, and others may be held at Evin Prison in Tehran, including Kasra Nouri

== Protests ==
On 19 February, the Sufis organized a sit-in protest at a police station, located in the Pasdaran district of Tehran, where one of their members was held. Later, clashes broke out between the Sufi protestors and security forces. Police used tear gas in an attempt to disperse the protesters. Five riot police were killed.

According to the Iranian press, police arrested around 300 people, and there have been reports that some of the protesters may have been killed. However, the Sufi dervishes gathered around the home of their 90-year-old leader Noor Ali Tabandeh to protect him from arrest.

In the aftermath of the 19 February, protests, footage emerged that showed several Sufi protesters who were arrested, being tortured by government forces.

On 4 March, it was revealed that one of the protesters had died under the custody of the Iranian government.

== See also ==
- Noor Ali Tabandeh
- Kasra Nouri
