= Ali Ashtari =

Iranian accused of espionage for the Israeli government

Ali Ashtari علی اشتری
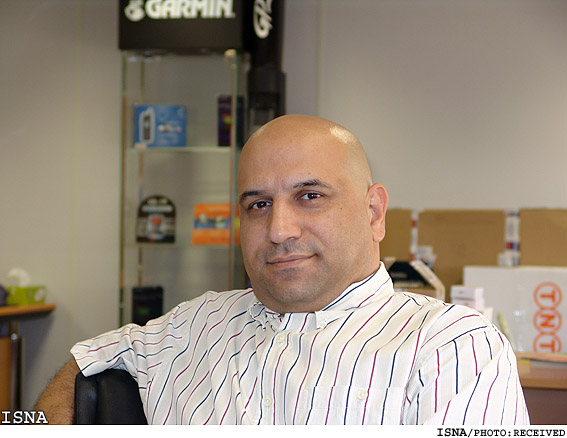
- Born: 1963; Tehran
- Died: 2008 November 17, Monday (aged 45); Tehran
- Cause of death: execution
- Occupation: freelance job
- Known for: One of the Iranians who were executed on charges of spying for Israel.
- Political party: No party affiliation

Ali Ashtari (Persian: علی اشتری; born 1963 – died 2008) was an Iranian who was accused of espionage for the Israeli government. His trial commenced in 2008, and on 30 June, he was sentenced to death by the Branch 15 of the Islamic Revolutionary Court of Tehran. The execution was carried out on 17 November 2008. Ashtari's expertise lay in the field of electronics, allegedly in matters related to espionage.

== Background ==
According to the Ministry of Information of the Islamic Republic of Iran, Ashtari allegedly joined Mossad during one of his foreign trips. Mossad, the Israeli intelligence agency, reportedly enticed him with suitable psychological profiling, addressing his ethical, familial, and financial concerns. Ashtari gradually became aware of the true nature of Israeli intelligence elements after undergoing a series of phases.

=== Alleged modus operandi ===
Security sources in Iran claimed that Ali Ashtari, without bypassing the country's special intelligence filters, managed to expand his access and establish connections with various individuals. His presence in domestic and foreign forums, coupled with his ability to gain the trust of his clients, allowed him to be consulted in critical national centers and projects. Allegedly, he utilized the gathered information for the benefit of Israeli intelligence services.

His ability to instill trust among his clients led him to be consulted in essential national centers and projects. Reportedly, in some instances, he provided faulty components, leading to the failure of certain projects that were irreparable in some fields.

== Ministry of Intelligence Awareness and Confessions ==
The then-director of the Counterintelligence Organization of the Ministry of Intelligence stated that Ashtari's activities came to the attention of Iranian authorities through monitoring and controlling important national centers. They observed an excessive influx of Ashtari's presence in these areas, leading to suspicions and subsequent investigations. Upon scrutiny of his foreign travels, authorities discovered his collaboration with Mossad.

Ashtari reportedly confessed to all his collaborations during the initial stages of his arrest. The Ministry of Intelligence reportedly gained awareness of 90% of his activities, with Ashtari later admitting to the remaining 10%.

== Execution ==
Ali Ashtari's death sentence was carried out on the early morning of 17 November 2008.

== Note ==
- The information provided here is based on Iranian sources and may be subject to interpretation and varying perspectives.
