= Noor-Ali Tabandeh =

Iranian spiritual leader

Noor Ali Tabandeh
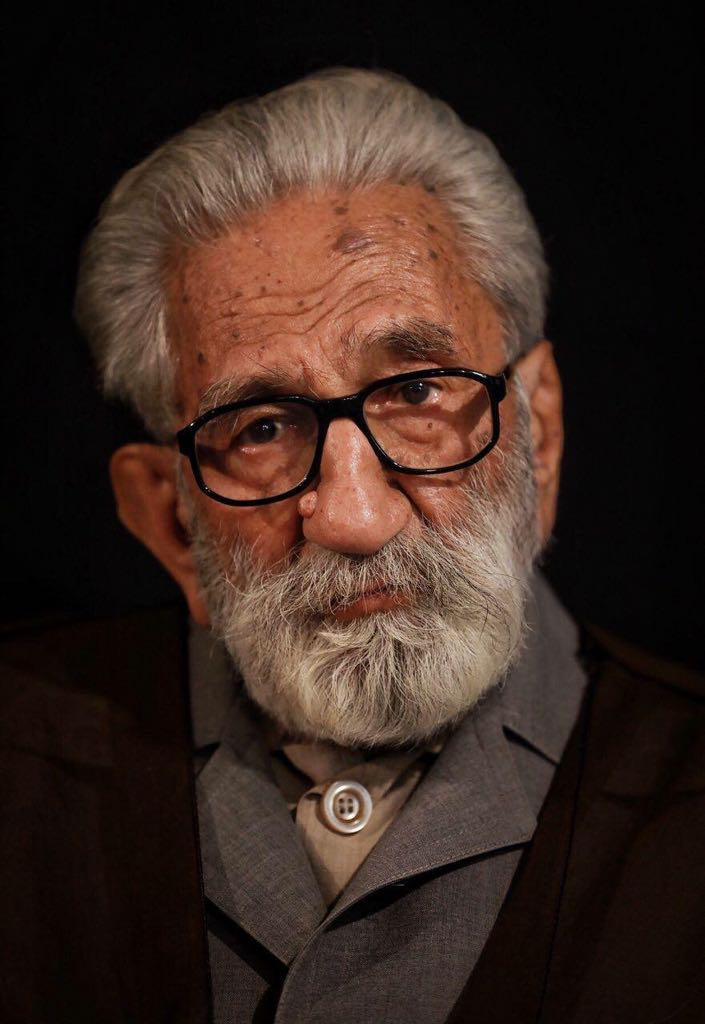
- Tabandeh in October 2015
- Preceded by: Ali Tabandeh (Mahboub Ali Shah)
- Succeeded by: Alireza Jazbi (Sabet Ali Shah)
- Title: Majzoub Ali Shah II

Personal life
- Born: 13 October 1927 Bidokht, Persia
- Died: 24 December 2019 (aged 92) Tehran, Iran
- Resting place: Sultani Tomb, Bidokht

Religious life
- Religion: Islam
- Denomination: Shia
- Tariqa: Gonabadi
- Creed: Dervish

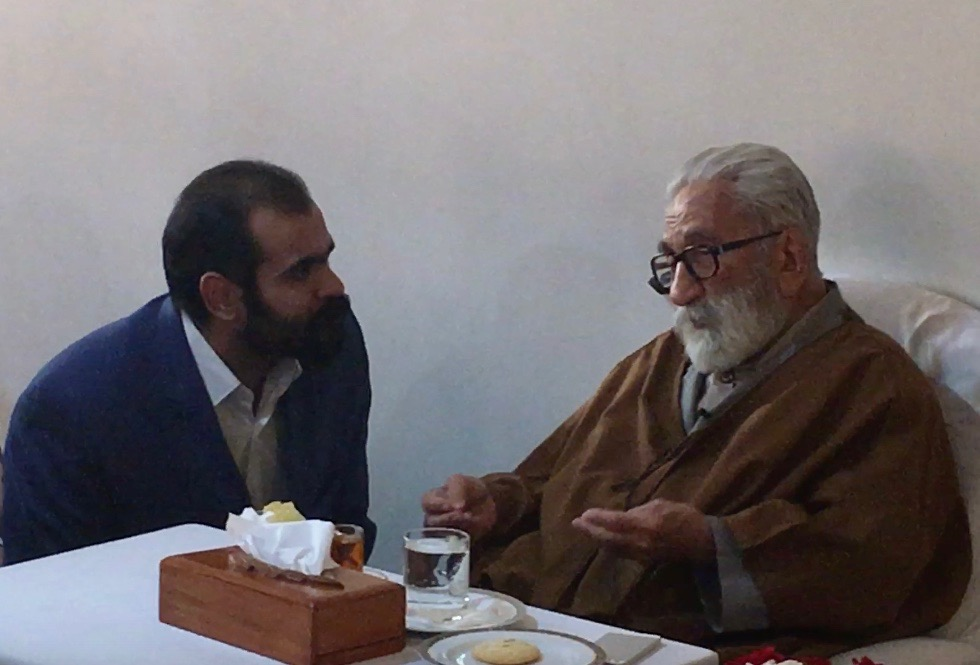
Noor-Ali Tabandeh and Kasra Nouri, Sufi’s rights activist in 2018

Noor-Ali Tabandeh (also known by the title Majzoub Ali Shah; Persian: نورعلی تابنده, October 13, 1927 – December 24, 2019) was the spiritual leader or Qutb of the Ni'matullah (Sultan Ali Shahi) Gonabadi Order in Iran (Gonabadi Dervishes), which is the largest Sufi order in Iran. He was born in Beydokht, Gonabad, Iran and died in Mehr Hospital in Tehran on December 24, 2019 after two years of house arrest.

During his time within the Ministry of Justice and working as an attorney, Tabandeh made considerable efforts to support the human and social rights of Iranians, for which he was imprisoned and suffered numerous persecutions. Since the 2018 crackdown of the regime on followers of the Gonabadi order, he was held under house arrest by the authorities.

== Education and career ==
As a young man he received teachings from his father in Beydokht, a dependency of Gonabad, and learnt the rudiments of Islamic science and traditional and modern astronomy. In 1945 he travelled to Tehran and acquired a first grade Diploma in Literature and in 1946 obtained a Diploma in Natural Science from the Tehran Elmiyeh High School and entered the law faculty of Tehran University. In 1948, he obtained a Bachelor of Science degree in judicial law and simultaneously engaged in the study and research of Islamic sciences. He specialised in religious jurisprudence and its principles, taught by his elder brother the master of spiritual sciences, Sultan Hussein Tabandeh (Reza Ali Shah), and used to attend study classes of the late master Shahabi, master Seyed Mohammad Meshkat and the late Sheikh Mohammad Sangalaji, whilst employed in the Ministry of Foreign Affairs.

In 1950 he was transferred to the Ministry of Justice and was assigned as the Head of the Office of Guardianship of the Courts of Tehran and later as the advisor of the courts of the province of Tehran.

In 1952 under the guidance of his father, Mohammad Hassan Bechareh Beydokhti (Saleh Ali Shah), he entered into the path of Sufism and for the completion of this education, he travelled to France. In 1957, after finishing his education in the field of French literature, he obtained his doctorate in the field of law and came back to Iran and continued work in various occupations in the Ministry of Justice.

During a few journeys to Europe, he met often with Henry Corbin a French orientalist who was interested in the teachings and methods of Sultan Ali Shah and started to study under him in the aforementioned subject. Again in the summer of 1968 he went to Paris with a French government scholarship to study judicial law and engaged in research in the International Management Institute (PAII) and obtained a diploma in judicial management.

Upon retirement from the judiciary in 1976, he went on to act as an attorney and in the same year he travelled to Paris for study and research. After the Iranian revolution, for some time he was the assistant director to the Ministry of Guidance and a member of the Management Board of Trustees of the Hajj and Pilgrimage Organization and was then appointed as the assistant director to the Ministry of Justice and Minister of Justice. In the autumn of 1980 he resigned this position.

== Political activities and governmental oppression ==
Tabandeh was a protege of Mohammad Mossadegh and active in his National Front. He had a long association with the Freedom Movement of Iran which seeks constitutional reform along the lines of secular freedoms of expression, ideas and belief. It was according to these beliefs that he signed his name on a petition addressed to Akbar Rafsanjani opposing the Iranian totalitarian government. As a result he was imprisoned for around two years charged with being ‘against the theocracy of Velayat-e-Faqih'. For six months of this sentence he was held in solitary confinement.

Similar persecutions have occurred towards Tabandeh and the Gonabadi Sufi’s over the past decades, such as in 1981, when the spiritual center of the Order in Tehran was set ablaze and completely destroyed. Furthermore, between 2009 - 2013 many worship houses were destroyed and since then the number of persecutions increased. Following the 2018 Dervish protests in Tehran, which led to the arrest of over 300 Sufis and the torturing of many Sufi men and women, Tabandeh, then 91 years of age, who was seen as the leader of the Sufi community was under complete house arrest, without access to medical assistance and denied contact with the outside world

== Leadership authorisation of the Nematollahi Gonabadi Order ==
On September 9, 1992, corresponding with the death of Sultan Hussein Tabandeh, the leadership of the order was passed down to his son Ali Tabandeh (Mahboob Ali Shah). On October 20, 1992, a spiritual authorisation decree was issued to Dr Noor Ali Tabandeh under the title of Majzoub Ali Shah by Ali Tabandeh (Mahboub Ali Shah). After the death of Ali Tabandeh, on 16, January 1997, Noor Ali Tabandeh officially took charge of the guidance of the Nematollahi Gonabadi Sufi order.

== See also ==
- 2018 Dervish protests
- Kasra Nouri

Religious titles
| Preceded by Ali Tabandeh (Mahboub Ali Shah) | Qutb of Ni'matullahi Gonabadi Order; 1997–2019 | Succeeded by Alireza Jazbi (Sabet Ali Shah) |
