= Kasra Nouri =

Iranian Jurist and political activist

- کسری نوری
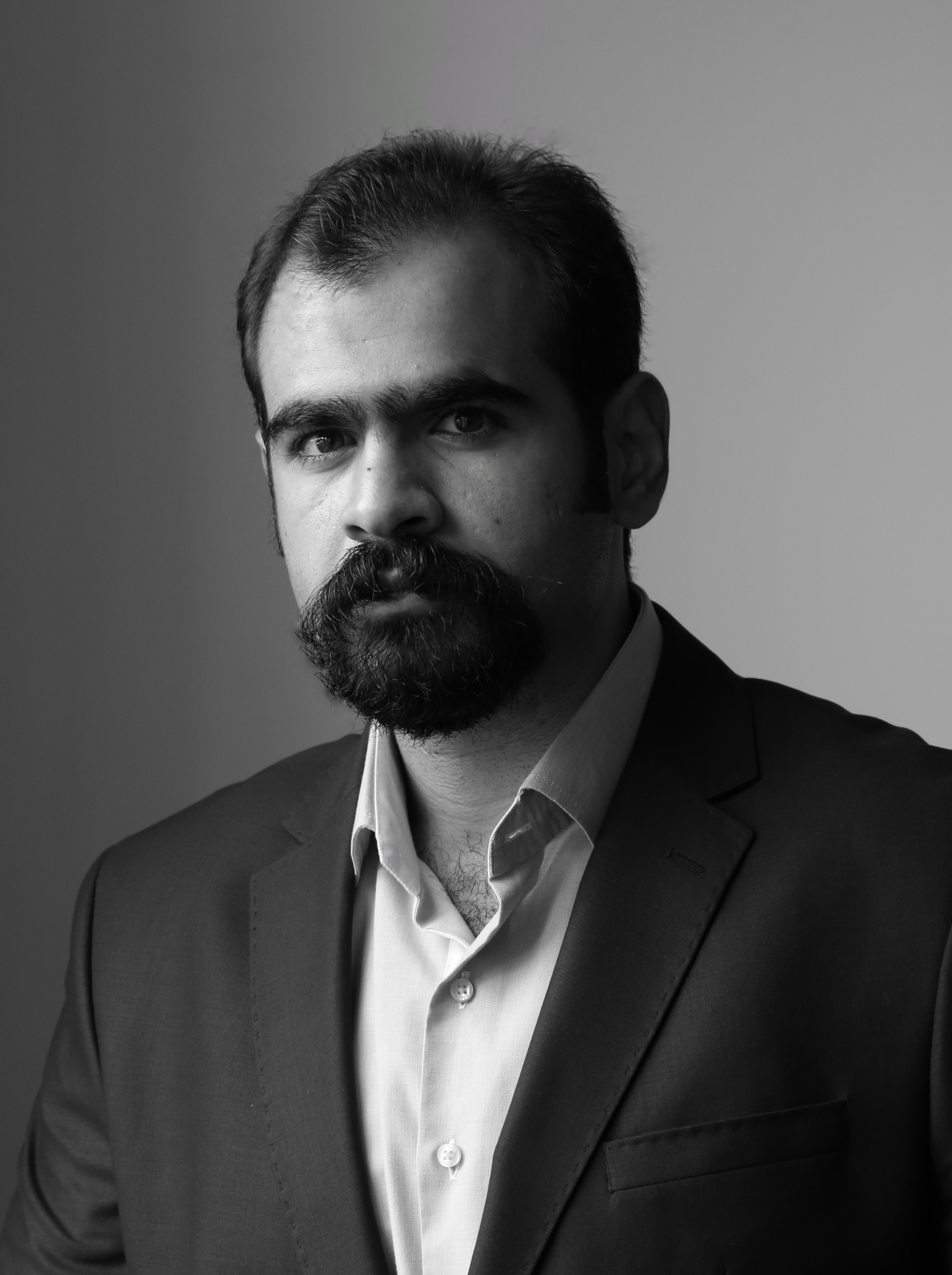
- Born: 27 June 1990 (age 36); Iran
- Education: University of Tehran
- Occupations: political activist Editor of Majzooban-e noor
- Known for: Political prisoner
- Website: www.majzooban.org

Kasra Nouri (Persian: کسری نوری) is an Iranian journalist and political activist. He was the CEO of "Majzooban-e noor" website, which covered news about the Dervish religious community, Nouri was last arrested with his family during 2018 Dervish protests and sentenced to 12 years in prison and 148 lashes.

Iranian journalist Kasra Nouri was arrested in February 2018 while covering religious protests for the Majzooban-e-Noor website, which covers news about the Gonabadi Dervishes, a Sufi splinter group. He is serving a 12-year sentence on anti-state charges in Adel-Abad prison near the central city of Shiraz, after initially being held in the Greater Tehran Penitentiary. Tehran's Appeals Court upheld his sentence in March 2019.

During the 2018 Dervish protests, he was arrested along with his mother Shokoufeh Yadollahi and his brothers Pouria Nouri and Amir Nouri.

Majzooban-e-Noor covers news about the Gonabadi dervishes' religious community. Nouri had reported that security and intelligence forces had incited residents to attack the dervishes during a September 2011 confrontation, causing one death and injuries to several others. Many dervishes, including several other journalists with Majzooban-e-Noor, were imprisoned immediately after the 2011 crackdown.

Nouri was arrested in 2012 and was sentenced in 2013 to four years and four months in prison for "propaganda against the regime," "acting against national security," "insulting the Supreme Leader," and "membership in the Majzooban-e-Noor group," according to Majzooban-e-Noor.

He supported Mehdi Karroubi (presidential candidate) in the 2009 Iranian presidential election.

The journalist was arrested five times by security forces.

In October 2021, the then president of the University of Tehran, Mahmoud Nili Ahmadabadi, wrote a letter to Gholam-Hossein Mohseni-Eje'i, the head of the Islamic Republic's judiciary, demanding the release of Kasra Nouri, a student prisoner, and a day later the president of the University of Tehran himself was fired.

== Arrest and imprisonment ==
He was first arrested on 11 January 2012 at his home by plainclothes police, which occurred after 47 days of confinement in the Intelligence Office. His family knew nothing of his whereabouts or condition until a month later; after repeated attempts, they were finally allowed to visit. Known under the pseudonym "No. 100", he was released on bail set at 50 million Tomans (or 500,000,000 Iranian Rials). The temporary release of political prisoners took two weeks. For the second time, on 24 March, he was again arrested at his home by plainclothes police after an alleged interview with Radio Free Europe. His release on bail was blocked, after 15 months in detention and transfer to the Revolutionary Court of Shiraz, he was sentenced on 23 April 2012, receiving a four-year, four-month jail term.

According to the Human Rights Campaign the charge against him states that this human right activist's actions would result "promoting innovation in doctrine matters", "insecurity in society and promoting superstitions". The warrant was issued by Judge Rashidi, president of Branch 3 of the Revolutionary Court of Shiraz and finally, after a delay of five months was confirmed in appeal. A qualified lawyer, in 2012 he and a group of other lawyers and human rights defenders issued calls to maintain the independence of the Iranian Bar.

Nouri was later arrested and jailed for anti-regime activities. He was arrested for 11 days in January 2018 and imprisoned in Evin Prison without any legal process. His mother told the BBC Persian service at the time that he went on a hunger strike immediately after his arrest. According to a January 2018 interview with Nouri by the Iranian Diaspora News Website WW, Nouri was finally released.

== Hunger strike ==
In January 2013, prisoners in Tehran protested against mistreatment by going on hunger strike for 90 days. The journalist began waging a hunger strike in April 2013 to protest the transfer to solitary confinement of several Majzooban-e Noor journalists. Finally, after authorities met the demands of dervishes, the prisoner hunger strike ended. Dervish prisoners on hunger strike along with Nouri caused worldwide concern over the situation. Ana Gomes, a member of the European Parliament wrote to the Iranian Embassy in Belgium and Portugal and sent a letter to the Iranian Foreign Ministry calling for Kasra Nouri and other dervishes imprisoned, to be freed. The German Foreign Ministry released a statement regarding the status of Kasra Nouri and other political prisoners, expressing concern on Germany's Deutsche Welle Radio on the 69th day of his hunger strike. Amnesty International also shared concern with regard to the issue. As well as this, in his statement Mr.Kasra Nouri claims that detention authorities in the Shiraz "prison ministry", beat the prisoners to end their hunger strike. The Nobel Peace Prize winner Shirin Ebadi, in a letter to Ahmed Shaheed, expressed sympathy over Kasra Nouri and the dervishes' situation, especially with regards to the rights of religious minorities in Iran.

== Convictions ==
Nouri was sentenced to 12 years in prison, 74 lashes, two years in exile in a remote city, a two-year ban on political, social and media activities, and a two-year ban on traveling outside Iran, U.S.-funded Radio Free Europe/Radio Liberty reported on 30 July 2018. Judge Mashaullah Ahmadzadeh, the head of Branch 26 of Tehran's Revolutionary Court, tried Nouri and issued the verdict against him in absentia, RFE/RL reported. In a 28 July post on Twitter, Majzooban-e-Noor said Nouri was convicted on a number of charges. An 29 August report by Human Rights Watch said these charges included "assembly and collusion against national security," "disrupting public order," "rebelling against officers on duty," and "propaganda against the state."

Nouri's brother, Pooria Nouri, confirmed the news on his personal Twitter account on 9 March 2019, writing, "due to my brother's decision not to appeal his verdict, his initial sentence was upheld and communicated/announced to him today in prison."

Kasra Nouri is charged with: propaganda against the regime, acting against national security, disclosing state secrets, interviews, membership in gangs majzooban deviant, insulting the leadership, public opinion, spreading lies, interview with the foreign media. He had two court cases in both the general public and Shiraz Criminal Court, calling the judge incompetent. He was sentenced to a one-year suspended sentence. with the verdict issued by Judge Rashid, head of the Revolutionary Court of Shiraz, Shiraz Branch 3 of the Revolutionary Court. He was sentenced to four years and four months.

== Education ==
- Shiraz University (2008–2012)
- University of Tehran (2017-)

== See also ==
- 2018 Dervish protests
- Noor Ali Tabandeh
- Seyed Mostafa Azmayesh
- Dervish
