= Liceo scientifico statale Camillo Cavour =

Liceo Scientifico Statale Camillo Cavour
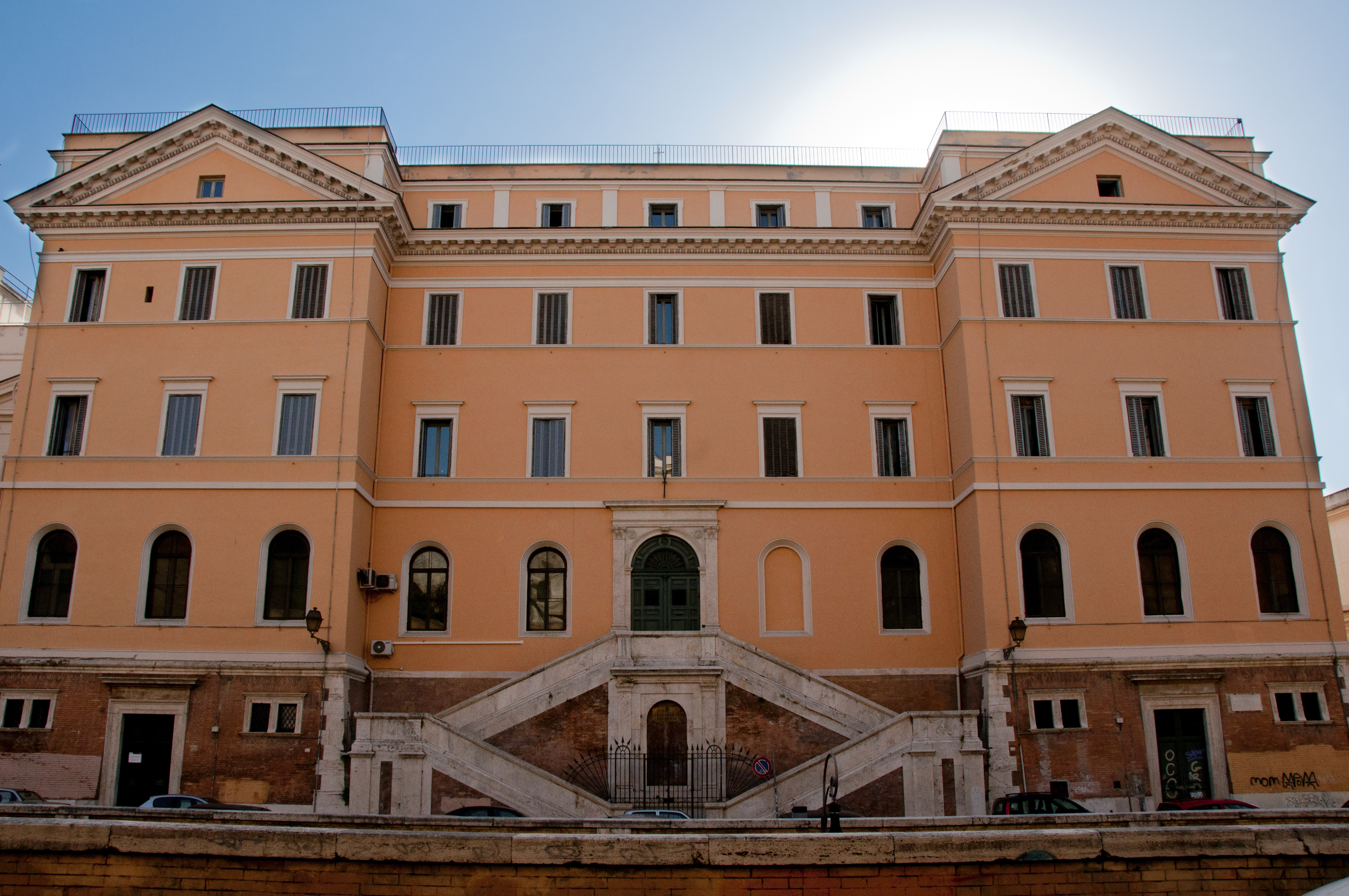

Location
- via delle Carine, 1 Rome, 00184; Italy
- 41.892757°N 12.491297°E

Information
- Type: liceo scientifico
- Established: 1871
- Principal: Claudia Sabatano
- Enrollment: 1002
- Sports: orienteering; chess; athletics
- Newspaper: Cavò
- Website: liceocavour.edu.it

Liceo scientifico statale Camillo Cavour (Italian for 'State scientific lyceum Camillo Cavour') is a liceo scientifico located in Rome, in via delle Carine 1, in Rione Monti. It was the first scientific lyceum in Rome, and potentially in the whole Italy.

== History ==
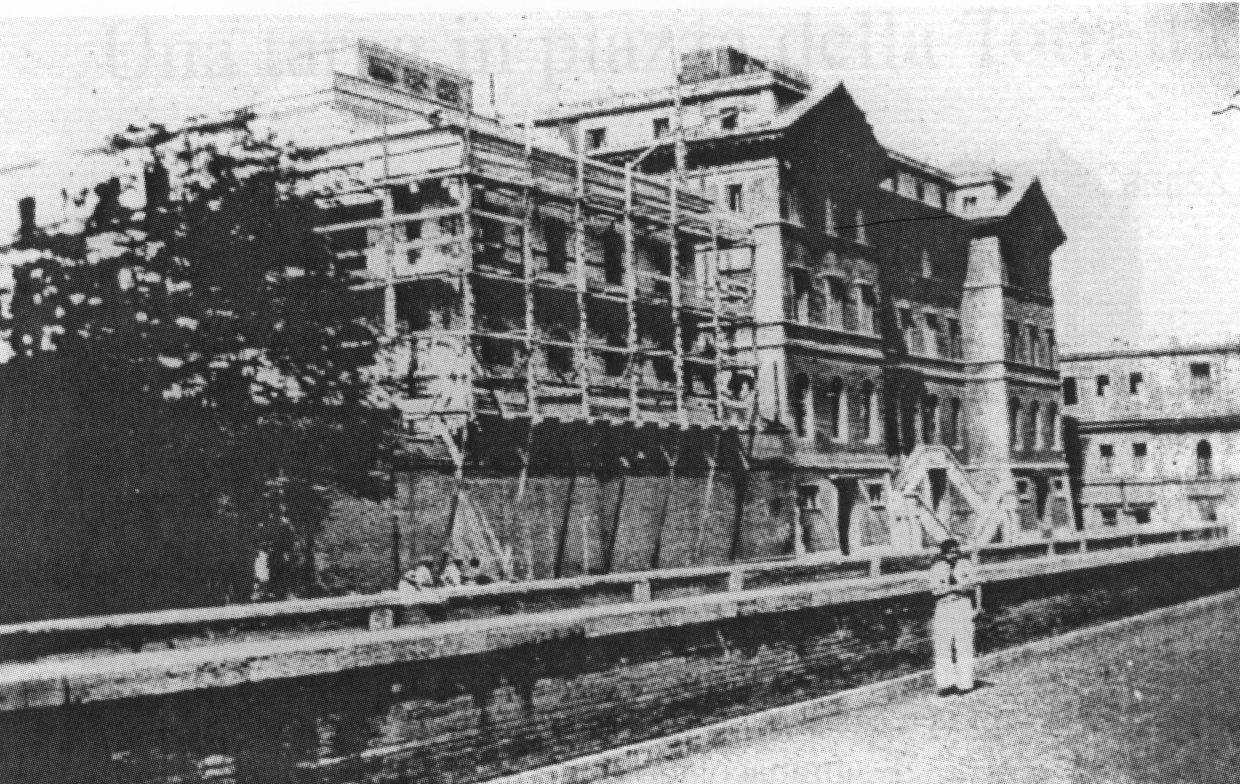
Construction of the second building

The Liceo Cavour was established in 1871 as the Physics and Mathematics branch of the Regio Istituto Tecnico di Roma (which later became the Istituto Tecnico-Commerciale Leonardo Da Vinci). After the Gentile Reform in 1923, this school became the Regio Liceo Scientifico di Roma, under the royal legislative decree of 9 September 1923, n. 1915. It was founded in 1923–24, as the scientific branch of liceo classico Ennio Quirino Visconti, the first liceo classico in Rome. In 1926 the Regio Liceo Scientifico di Roma was established as an independent body, starting teaching in 1926–27. In 1946, with the inauguration of the Liceo Scientifico Statale Augusto Righi (a branch of the Regio Liceo), the school was renamed Liceo Scientifico Camillo Cavour.

Among the more famous people to have worked here were the poet Margherita Guidacci, English language and literature teacher from 1965 to 1975, Gioacchino Gesmundo, History and Philosophy teacher from 1934 to 1944, and the physicist Bruno Pontecorvo (who was part of the group of physicists and scientists named I Ragazzi di Via Panisperna', 'Via Panisperna Boys') with his younger brother Umberto. Notable former students include Franca Falcucci, the future Minister of public education, and Marta Russo, whose murder garnered huge media attention.

== Structure ==
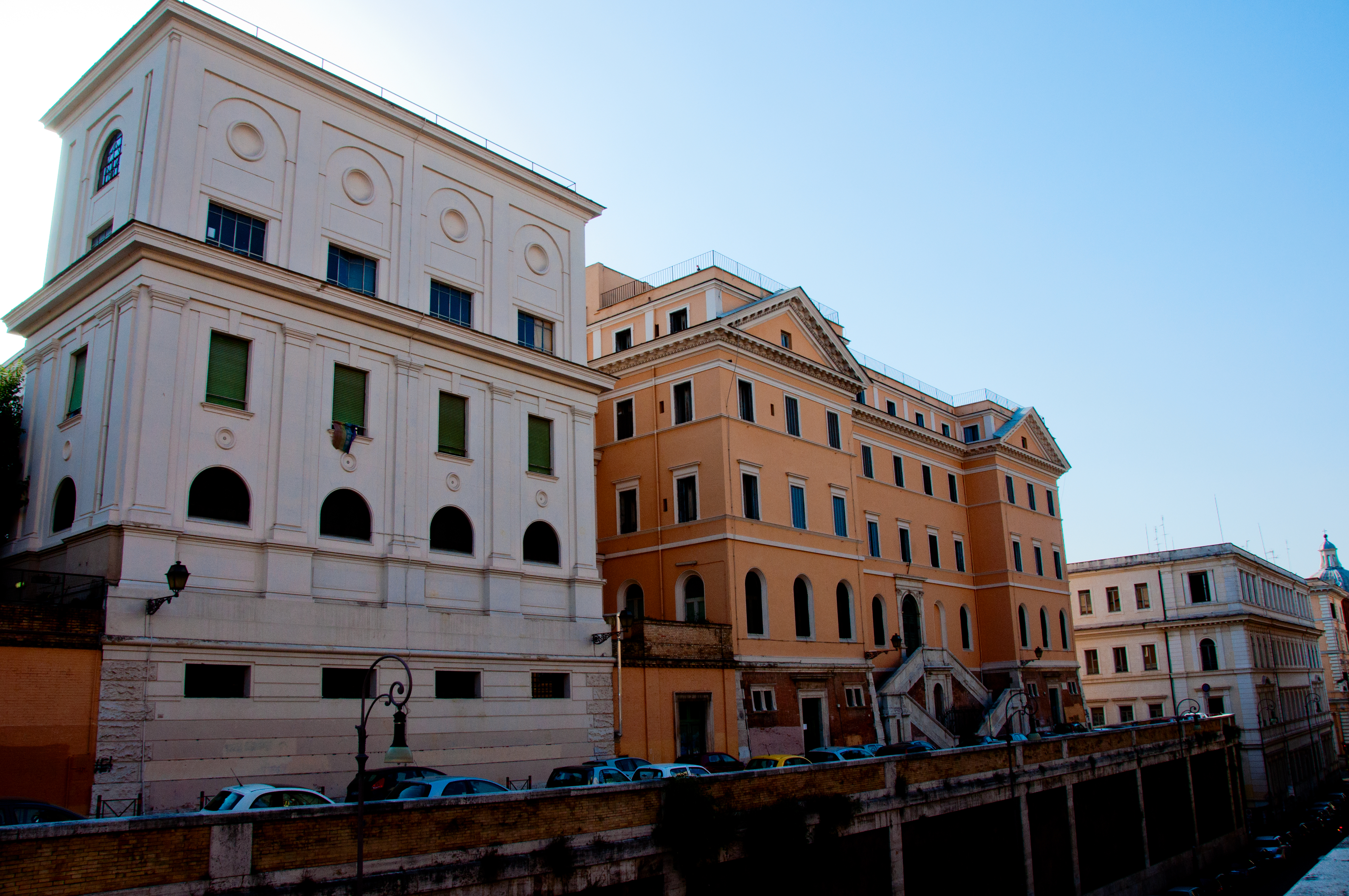
The two buildings: on the left side "palazzina B" and on the right side "palazzina A" (the oldest one)

Since its foundation until 1962, the liceo was based at 'ITC Leonardo da Vinci', in via Cavour 258. In October 1962 it moved to the new building in via Vittorino da Feltre 6, near the Colosseum. The building was built between 1884 and 1887 by architect Luca Carimini, and it initially housed the Missionary Oblates of Mary Immaculate college. In 1905, when the headquarters of the Oblates was moved to Rome, a second building was constructed close to the first one, and the access on via delle Carine was opened. The school is housed in both buildings.

Inside the liceo, in addition to several classrooms, there are a Chemistry laboratory and a Physics laboratory, Technical drawing classrooms, a language laboratory, a ICT laboratory, a lecture hall, a library, two gyms, two volleyball courts, a basketball court and a cafe.

== Curriculum ==
The liceo offers the traditional study plan of liceo scientifico. Until their abolition in 2010 as a result of the Gelmini Reform, a PNI trial (National plan of Computer Studies) and a bilingualism trial were activated; after the reform, they were blocked till depletion.

== Philately ==
On 29 September 2001, to celebrate the 75th anniversary of the school, Poste Italiane issued a postage stamp that portrayed the Liceo. Designed by Luigi Vangelli, it was produced in 3,500,000 copies.

== Links ==
It can be reached from Colosseo and Cavour stations.
It can be reached, since 2026, from Fori Imperiali/Colosseo station.

== See also ==
- Liceo Ginnasio Ennio Quirino Visconti
- Liceo Ginnasio Torquato Tasso

== Bibliography ==
- Cartocci, Alessandro (21 April 2010). "Il Cavour, primo liceo scientifico di Roma e D'Italia". Strenna dei Romanisti (in Italian). Vol. LXXI. Roma Amor. pp. 159–166.
- Poste Italiane (2001). Il libro dei francobolli d'Italia 2001 [Italian postage stamps book 2001] (in Italian). Edizione Poste Italiane. pp. 82–85.
