= Death of Mahsa Amini =

2022 killing in Tehran, Iran

- Date: 16 September 2022
- Location: Tehran, Iran
- Also known as: Death of Jina Amini
- Outcome: Mahsa Amini protests
- Burial: Saqqez, Kurdistan Province, Iran

On 16 September 2022, 22-year-old Kurdish-Iranian woman Mahsa Amini, (Note: Persian: مهسا امینی) also known as Jina Amini, (Note: sometimes also transliterated as Zhina Amini; Persian: ژینا امینی, romanized: Žīnā Amīnī; Kurdish: ژینا ئەمینی, romanized: Jîna Emînî. See Romanization of Persian and Comparison of Kurdish alphabets.) died in a hospital in Tehran, Iran, under suspicious circumstances. The Guidance Patrol, the religious morality police of Iran's government, had arrested Amini for allegedly not wearing the hijab in accordance with government standards. The Law Enforcement Command of the Islamic Republic of Iran stated that she had a heart attack at a police station, collapsed, and fell into a coma before being transferred to a hospital. However, eyewitnesses, including women who were detained with Amini, reported that she was severely beaten and that she died as a result of police brutality, which was denied by the Iranian authorities. The assertions of police brutality, in addition to leaked medical scans, led some observers to believe Amini had a cerebral hemorrhage or stroke due to head injuries received after her arrest.

Amini's death resulted in a series of protests described by CNN as more widespread than the protests in 2009, 2017, and 2019, and by The New York Times as the largest Iranian protests since at least 2009. Iran Human Rights reported that by December 2022 at least 476 people had been killed by security forces attacking protests across the country. Amnesty International reported that Iranian security forces had fired into groups with live ammunition and killed protesters by beating them with batons. Amini's death ignited the global Woman, Life, Freedom movement, rooted in her Kurdish background, which demands the end of compulsory hijab laws and other forms of discrimination and oppression against women in Iran. During the ensuing events some female demonstrators removed their hijab or publicly cut their hair as acts of protest.

== Background ==
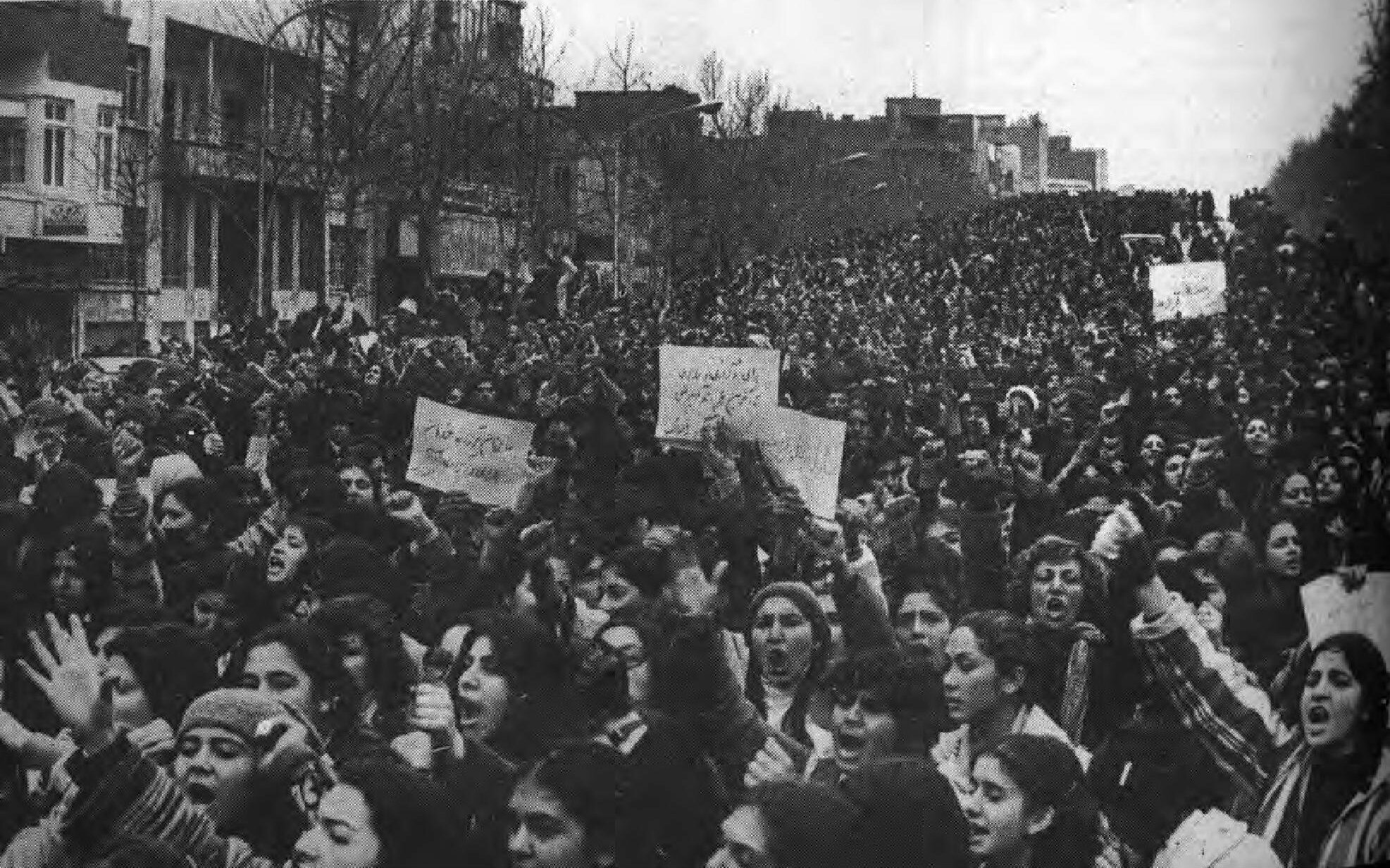
1979 Iranian Women Day's protests against mandatory hijab laws

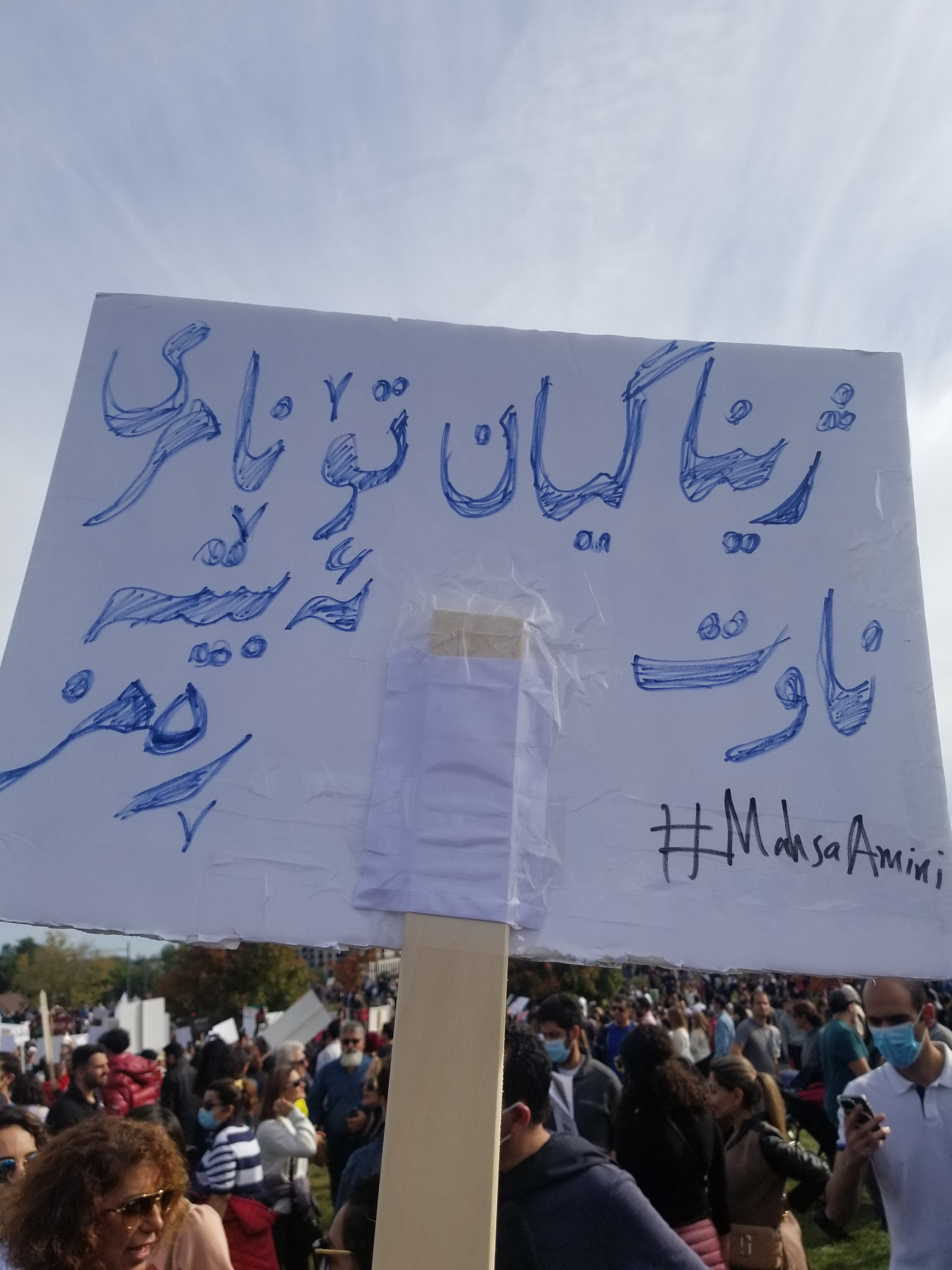
A sign in a protest in Toronto with the epitaph on Amini's grave in Kurdish that reads "Jina, dear! You will not die. Your name will turn into a symbol."

Iranian government introduced a mandatory dress code for women after the Iranian Revolution of 1979. On 7 March, less than a month after the revolution, then recently named Supreme Leader Ruhollah Khomeini decreed the hijab (Islamic headscarf) to be mandatory for all women in workplaces. He further decreed that women would no longer be allowed to enter any government office without the hijab, as they would be "naked" without it.

Since then, violence and harassment against women not wearing the hijab in accordance with Iranian government standards, whether by law enforcement personnel or pro-government vigilantes, has been reported. From 1980, women could not enter government or public buildings or attend their workplaces without a hijab. In 1983, mandatory hijab in public was introduced in the penal code, stating that "women who appear in public without religious hijab will be sentenced to whipping up to 74 lashes". In practice, however, a number of women, such as Saba Kord Afshari and Yasaman Aryani, were sentenced only to heavy prison terms.

In the 2010s and 2020s, clothing in Iranian society underwent significant changes, and young women in particular became more liberal about hijab rules. This has prompted the Guidance Patrol, Iran's morality police, to launch intermittent campaigns to verbally admonish or violently arrest and "re-educate" women they considered to be wearing the hijab incorrectly. Under routine circumstances, the detainees are brought to a center where they are re-instructed in the dress regulations, before being made to sign a pledge to uphold said regulations, and then being allowed to leave with their family.

Protests against the compulsory hijab have been common since 1979 revolution. One of the largest protests took place between 8 and 14 March 1979, beginning on International Women's Day, a day after hijab rules were introduced by the Islamic Republic. Protests against mandatory hijab rules continued, such as during the 2019–2020 protests, when protesters attacked a Guidance Patrol van and freed two detained women.

In 2020, two representatives of Supreme Leader Ali Khamenei separately said that improperly veiled women should be made to feel "unsafe". The representatives later backtracked and said that their comments were misunderstood. Among the general population, an independent survey conducted in the same year showed that 58% of Iranians did not believe in hijab altogether, and 72% were against compulsory hijab rules. Only 15% insisted on the legal obligation to wear it in public.

=== Victim ===
Mahsa Amini was born on 21 September 1999 to a Kurdish family in Saqqez, Kurdistan Province, in northwestern Iran. While Mahsa was her Persian given name, her Kurdish name was Jina (also spelled Zhina), and this was the name her family used. In Persian Mahsa means "similar to the moon" and in Kurdish, Jina means "life" or "a life-giving person".

Amini attended Hijab Secondary School and in 2015, Taleghani High School, to earn a diploma. She aspired to become a doctor. At the time of her death, Amini had recently been admitted to university in Urmia, where she would have studied biology. Before starting university, she travelled to Tehran with her parents and 17-year-old brother, Ashkan, to visit relatives.

Amini's father rejected claims by the Iranian government that Amini was involved in any politics. Instead, Amini has been described as having been a "shy, reserved resident" of her hometown who avoided politics, was never politically active as a teenager, and was not an activist. According to those who knew her closely, Amini did not follow the news, did not have many friends and mostly socialized with her relatives. Amini's family have described her as having no prior health conditions, and as being a healthy 22-year-old, contrasting the claims made by the Iranian government that she possessed prior health conditions.

=== Family ===
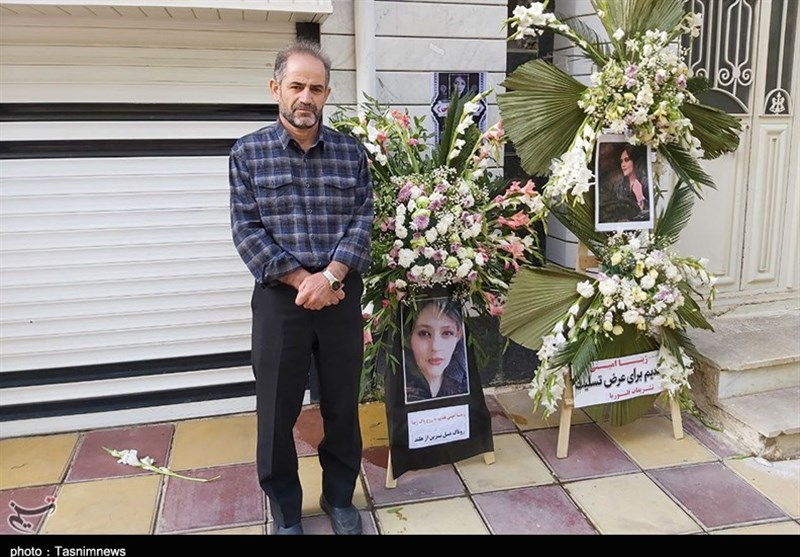
Amjad Amini, Mahsa Amini's Father

Amini's father is an employee in a government organization and her mother is a housewife. Her mother was an active member of the Parents and Teachers Association for three years in Shahrak Elementary School, Hijab Secondary School and Taleghani High School. She had one younger brother, Kiarash (Ashkan).

Amini's cousin, a left-wing political activist belonging to the Komala party and a Peshmerga fighter living in self-exile in Iraqi Kurdistan, was the first member of Amini's family to speak to the media after her death.

=== Opposition to hijab ===
For Amini, as can be seen from her photos and videos on social media, only the mandatory rules made her wear hijab half-heartedly. She did not observe the hijab in various events such as weddings and wore traditional Kurdish clothes that do not have a hijab. She also partially observed hijab when traveling to tourist areas. This issue caused the moral security officers to arrest her and beat her. This also caused people, especially women and girls, to join her and put away their hijab.

== Circumstances of death ==
Amini had come to Tehran to visit her brother and on 13 September 2022 was arrested by the Guidance Patrol at the entry of the Shahid Haghani Expressway in Tehran while in the company of her family. She was then transferred to the custody of Moral Security. Amini's brother, who was with her when she was arrested, was told she would be taken to the detention center to undergo a "briefing class" and released an hour later. Amini was beaten by police shortly after her arrest, while in a police van. After she arrived at the police station, she began to lose vision and fainted. Two hours after her arrest, Amini was taken to Kasra Hospital. It took 30 minutes for the ambulance to arrive, and an hour and a half for her to get to Kasra hospital. Iranian police later denied beating Amini, claiming she had "suffered a sudden heart failure". Police later stated to her brother that his sister had a heart attack and a brain seizure at the police station to which she had been taken.

Kasra Hospital (pictured in 2016) was the place where Amini died.

For two days, Amini was in a coma in Kasra Hospital in Tehran. On 16 September, journalist Niloofar Hamedi (later arrested) broke the story of her coma, posting to Twitter a photo of Amini's father and grandmother crying and embracing in the hospital hallway. Amini died in the intensive care unit later that day. The clinic where Amini was treated released a statement on Instagram saying that she had already been brain dead when she had been admitted around 13 September. By 19 September, the post had been deleted.

On 17 September, the police chief of Tehran stated that the grounds of Amini's arrest were wearing her headscarf improperly and for wearing tight pants.

Published hospital pictures show Mahsa Amini bleeding from the ear and with bruises under her eyes. In an 18 September letter, Doctor Hossein Karampour (the top medical official in Hormozgan province), pointed out that such symptoms "do not match the reasons given by some authorities who declared the cause to be a heart attack... (they are instead consistent with) a head injury and the resulting bleeding." This was also confirmed by alleged medical scans of her skull, leaked by hacktivists, showing bone fracture, hemorrhage, and brain edema.

By 19 September, police had released CCTV footage showing a woman, who they identified as Amini, talking with an official. In the footage, the official grabs Amini's clothing, and Amini holds her head with her hands and collapses. Amini's father dismissed the footage as an "edited version" of events. Amini's brother noticed bruises on her head and legs. The women who were detained with Amini said she had been severely beaten for resisting the insults and curses of the arresting officers.

According to Iran International, the Iranian government was forging fake medical records for Amini, showing that she had a history of heart disease. On 20 September, Massoud Shirvani, a neurosurgeon, stated on state-owned television that Amini had a brain tumor that was extracted at the age of eight.

A low-resolution copy of an alleged CT scan of Amini post-arrest that was leaked to Iran International.

By 21 September, the hospital had released preliminary CT scans. Government supporters stated the CT scans showed psychological stress caused by a previous brain operation; critics stated the scans showed physical beating and trauma. The Iranian government stated Amini had a brain operation at the age of five.

Regarding various government claims, Mahsa Amini's father (Amjad Amini) told the BBC around 22 September that "they are lying... She never had any medical conditions, she never had surgery." (Two classmates, interviewed by the BBC, said that they weren't aware of Mahsa ever being in hospital.) Amjad said he had not been allowed to view his daughter's autopsy report. He denied that Mahsa had been in bad health. "I asked them to show me the body-cameras of the security officers, they told me the cameras were out of battery." Iranian authorities had charged that Mahsa was wearing immodest clothes when arrested; Amjad rejected this claim, stating that she always wore a long overcoat. Amjad said he was repeatedly prevented by medical staff from seeing his daughter's body after her death: "I wanted to see my daughter, but they wouldn't let me in", and charged that when he asked to see the autopsy report, he was told by the doctor: "I will write whatever I want and it has nothing to do with you." Amjad saw the body after it had been wrapped for the funeral, and noticed bruises on her feet, but could not see the rest of the body due to the wrapping. Iranian authorities denied any head injuries or internal injuries.

According to Iran International, on 29 September an audio file was released by a former commander of Iran's Revolutionary Guards Corps, which reported unnamed "reliable sources" saying that the reason for Mahsa Amini's death was an injury to her skull and that the injury was the result of a severe beating.

The Amini family's lawyer, Saleh Nikbakht, told the Etemad online news website that "respectable doctors" believe Mahsa was hit while in custody. Nikbakht also said the family wants a fact-finding committee to probe her death, and that police footage filmed after her arrest should be handed over.

By 2 October, Amini's family had acknowledged that Amini had an operation for a minor neurological condition (possibly a brain tumor) at the age of eight, but said it had been under control through levothyroxine (a medication to treat hypothyroidism), and that her doctors had recently given her the all-clear. Citing medical specialists they had consulted, the family stated the condition was unrelated to Amini's death.

A 7 October coroner's report stated that Amini's death was "not caused by blows to the head and limbs" and instead linked her death to pre-existing medical conditions, ruling that she had died from multiple organ failure caused by cerebral hypoxia. The report stated Amini had had a brain tumor operation when she was eight. The report did not say whether Amini had suffered any injuries.

In a 13 October letter, over 800 members of Iran's Medical Council accused the head of Iran's Medical Council of assisting in a government cover-up of the cause of Mahsa Amini's death.

In an 8 December article, Der Spiegel confirmed with Amini's grandfather that Amini had a brain tumor removed when she was an elementary school student. Amini's grandfather emphasized that the tumor was benign, and stated that she never had any health problems since the operation. Der Spiegel also relayed a report from one her two cousins present at Amini's arrest, stating that Amini had been forced into the arrest vehicle by the morality police.

On 11 September 2023, Reza Behrouz, an Iranian opposition doctor living in Texas, said in a post on X that he saw no skull fracture or brain injury in Mahsa Amini's CT scans. He said Iran International had contacted him to comment on the scans. Behrouz said they had decided not to talk about the scans because they thought it could affect the protest movement. He later deleted the post.

=== 2024 United Nations Human Rights Council report ===
In a report released on 8 March 2024, the United Nations Human Rights Council concluded that Amini's death was caused by physical violence she suffered while in morality police custody. The report found Iran responsible for her death and claimed the government had attempted to hide the truth and intimidate Amini's family rather than conduct an impartial investigation. In addition, the report found evidence of widespread human rights violations during Iran's response to protests in 2022 and 2023, with many amounting to crimes against humanity.

=== Iranian government investigation ===
President Ebrahim Raisi asked Interior Minister Ahmad Vahidi to investigate the cause of her death thoroughly. In early October the Legal Medical Organization of Iran's judiciary reasoned Amini had died due to underlying disease stemming from brain surgery she had at the age of eight.

== Protests ==
A series of protests and civil unrest against the government of Iran began in Tehran on 16 September 2022 as a reaction to the death of Amini that day following police custody, after she was arrested by the Guidance Patrol for wearing an "improper" hijab—in violation of Iran's mandatory hijab law—while visiting Tehran from Saqqez. According to eyewitnesses, Amini was severely beaten by Guidance Patrol officers—an assertion denied by Iranian authorities.

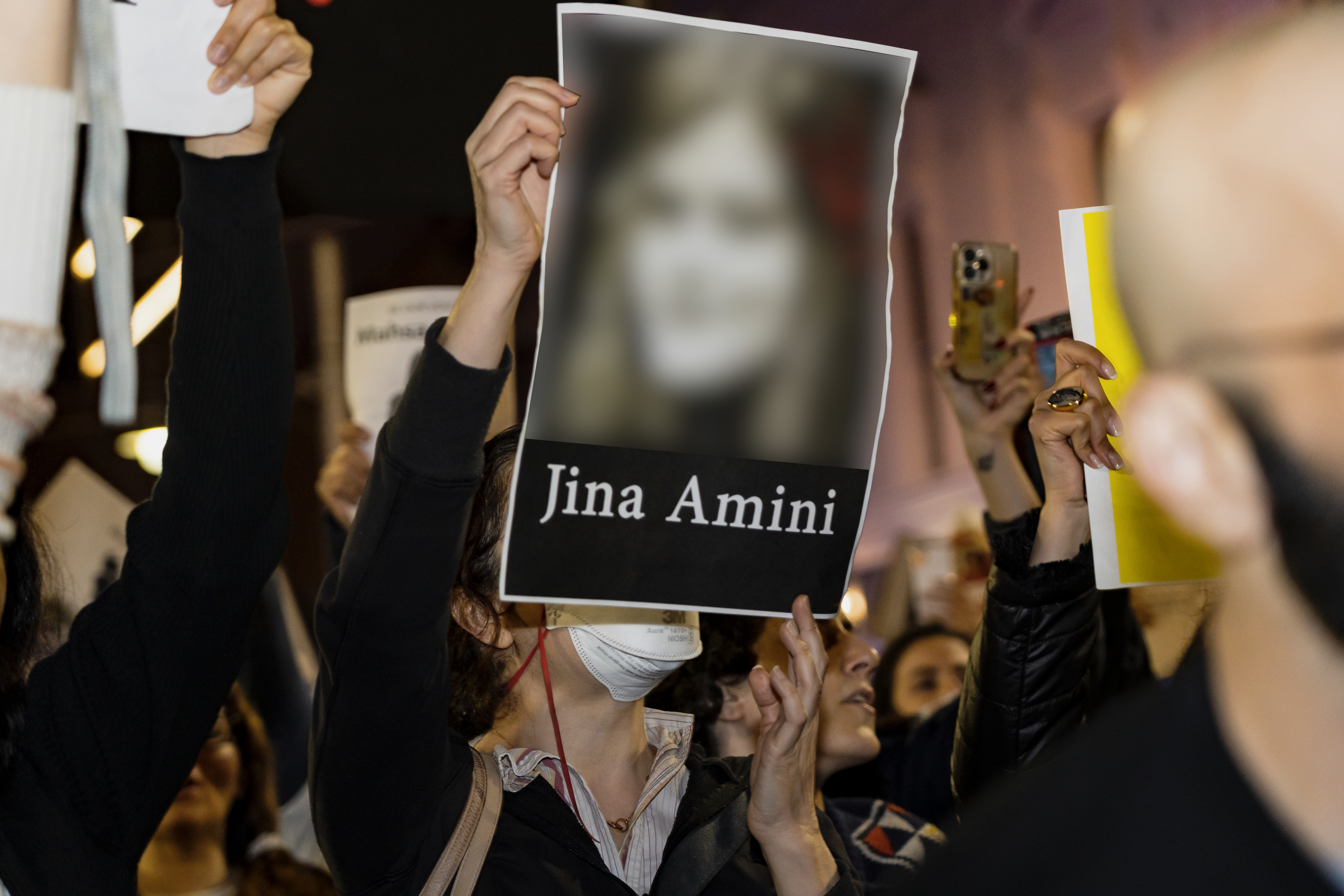
Protests in Melbourne to stand in solidarity with the Iranian protests.

The protests began hours after Amini's death, starting at the hospital in Tehran where she was treated and quickly spreading to other parts of the country, first to Amini's hometown of Saqqez and other cities in the Kurdistan Province, including Sanandaj, Divandarreh, Baneh, and Bijar. In response to these demonstrations, beginning around 19 September the Iranian government implemented regional shutdowns of Internet access. As protests grew, a widespread Internet blackout was imposed along with nationwide restrictions on social media. In response to the protests, people held demonstrations in support of the government across several cities in Iran, in an attempt to counter the protests. The Iranian government has referred to these counter-protests as "spontaneous". The pro-government protesters called for the anti-government protesters to be executed, and have referred to them as "Israel's soldiers", whilst shouting "Death to America" and "Death to Israel", reflecting Iran's clerical rulers' usual narrative of putting the blame of the unrest on foreign countries. On 3 October, in his first statement since the outbreak of the protests, Supreme Leader Ayatollah Ali Khamenei dismissed the widespread unrest as "riots", and likewise tried to cast it as a foreign plot.

The inscription on Amini's tombstone reads in Kurdish:

Kurdish: ژینا گیان تۆ نامری. ناوت ئەبێتە ڕەمز
romanized: Jîna gyan to namirî. Nawit ebête remz.
"Beloved Žina [Mahsa], you will not die. Your name will become a symbol." (Note: Some sources use "rallying call" rather than "symbol" when translating the epitaph.)

According to Iran Human Rights, as of 8 October 2022 at least 185 people have been killed as a result of the government's intervention in the protests, involving tear gas and live rounds, making the protests the deadliest since the 2019–2020 protests that resulted in more than 1,500 fatalities. The government's response to the protests has largely been condemned, and the United States Department of the Treasury has sanctioned the Guidance Patrol and several high-ranking Iranian officials.

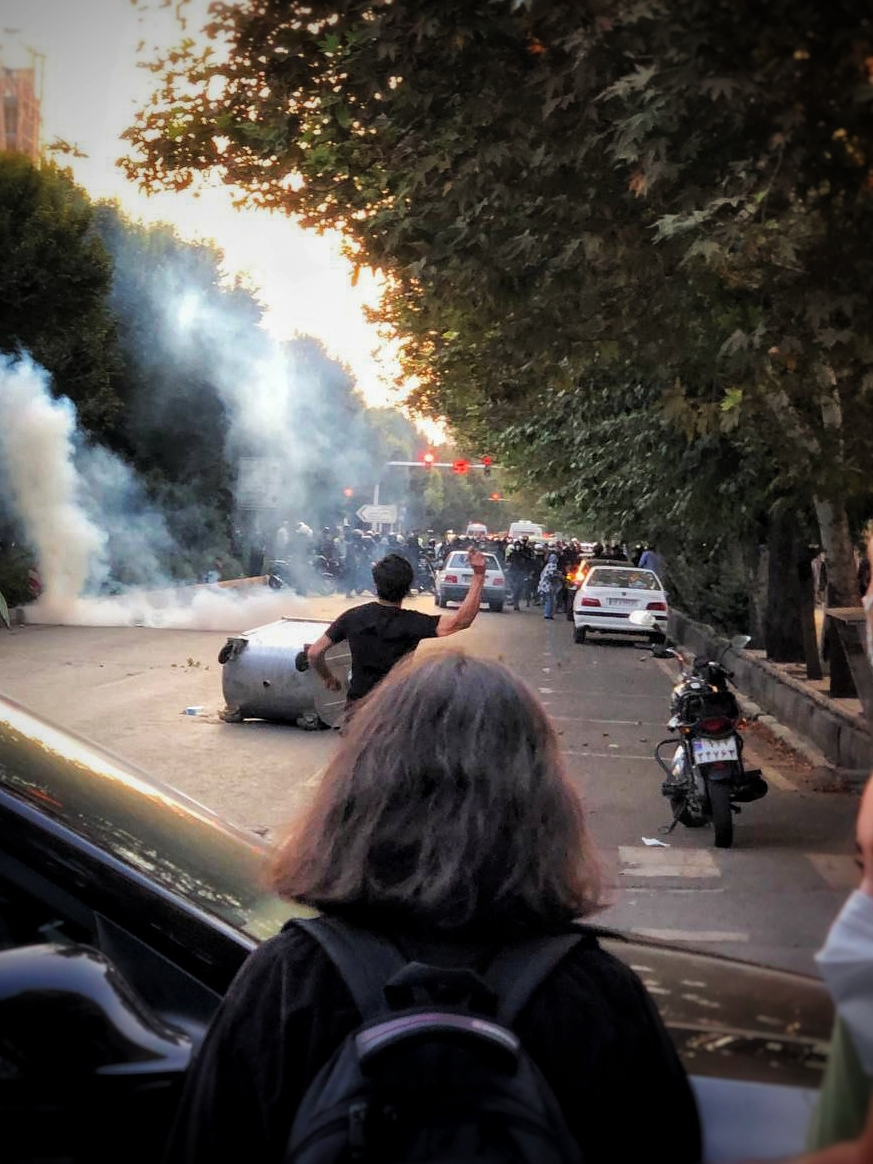
People protest against Amini's killing in Tehran's Keshavarz Blvd

On 17 September, hours after Amini died, demonstrators gathered outside Kasra Hospital in Tehran, where Amini had been treated. Human rights groups reported that security forces deployed pepper spray against protesters and that several were arrested. Then a series of protests broke out over Amini's death, including in Saqqez, her hometown. Some shouted "death to the dictator", and Kurdish feminist slogans such as "woman, life, freedom".

A spokesperson for Hengaw, a Kurdish human rights group, stated that "the security institutions forced the Amini family to hold the funeral without any ceremony to prevent tensions."

=== On social media ===
Amini's beating and death caused widespread anger among several social networks. The hashtag #MahsaAmini became one of the most repeated hashtags on Persian Twitter. The number of tweets and retweets of these hashtags have exceeded 80 million. Some Iranian women posted videos on social media of themselves cutting their hair in protest. It was reported on 21 September that the Iranian government had blocked internet access to Instagram and WhatsApp and disrupted internet service in Kurdistan and other parts of Iran in an attempt to silence the unrest. As of 24 September, the hashtag #Mahsa_Amini and its equivalent in Persian broke the Twitter record with more than 80 million tweets. According to Professor Marc Owen Jones at Hamad Bin Khalifa University, of 108,000 accounts in a sample of online protestors, 13,000 were created in the month of September 2022, suggesting thousands of the accounts may be fake, presumably by pro- or anti-government manipulators.

== Other immediate reactions ==
=== Domestic ===
Amini's father was interviewed by various international media about his daughter's death and answered the claims of Iranian government officials. In a phone call with him, the president of Iran, Ebrahim Raisi, expressed regret over Amini's death. The governor of Kurdistan Province personally went to Amini's father's house and consoled him about the death of his daughter. In an interview with BBC Persian, the father accused the authorities of lying about her death and noted that every time he was asked how he thinks she died, his response was mysteriously cut from local news broadcasts. He stressed that the authorities refused to let him see his daughter at the clinic, and that when he finally saw her body before the funeral, it was completely wrapped except for the face and feet, which had mysterious bruises.

The well-known Iranian lawyer, Saeed Dehghan, described Amini's death as "murder".

Supreme Leader of Iran Ali Khamenei called it a "bitter incident" and said that his "heart was broken for the young girl," but also added "this chaos was planned" in reference to the protests. President Ebrahim Raisi said that the death of Mahsa Amini will be "pursued," calling it a "tragic incident," but said that "chaos is unacceptable". He further accused western countries of "double standards" regarding human rights, adding "What about all the people killed by American police? Did all these deaths get investigated?".

On 17 September, Iranian Grand Ayatollah Ayatollah Bayat-Zanjani described the Guidance Patrol as "not only an illegal and anti-Islamic body, but also illogical." He said it was unsupported by Iran's laws and engaged in "repression and immoral acts".

In October 2022, Amini's family complained about receiving death threats to warn them against attending the protests.

=== International ===
==== Institutions and organizations ====
- Amnesty International requested a criminal investigation into the suspicious death. According to this organization, "all responsible officers and officials" in this case must be brought to justice and "the conditions leading to her suspicious death, which include torture and other ill-treatment in the detention center, must be investigated criminally."
- Human Rights Watch called Amini's death "cruel" and demanded from the Iranian authorities to end the mandatory hijab law and enhance the women rights situation in the country.
  - Additional concerns were raised by the group at the apparent lethal force retaliation by government officials to the protests.
- The Center for Human Rights in Iran declared Amini another victim of the Islamic Republic's "war on women" and stated that the tragedy should be strongly condemned worldwide to prevent further violence against women in Iran.
- Humanists International called for those responsible for the murder of Amini "to be held accountable", condemned Iran's "strictly enforced patriarchal religious norms", and added that "compulsory veiling is a human rights violation, and that appeals to religious 'morality' can never be used to police women's choices, or to invalidate their equal dignity and worth".
- The United Nations announced that the death and alleged torture of Amini should be investigated independently. A joint statement by UN experts "strongly condemned the death of 22-year-old Mahsa Amini, who died in police custody".

==== Politicians ====
Politicians such as Bill Clinton, Hillary Clinton, Nancy Pelosi, Nikki Haley, Jim Risch, Farah Pahlavi, Masoud Barzani, Justin Trudeau, Masud Gharahkhani, Annalena Baerbock, Mélanie Joly, and others reacted to Amini's death.

- Javaid Rehman, United Nations special rapporteur, expressed his regret for the behavior of the Islamic Republic of Iran and added: "This incident is a sign of widespread violation of human rights in Iran."
- France's Ministry of Foreign Affairs condemned the torture that led to Amini's death.
- United States Secretary of State Antony Blinken condemned the killing in the custody of Iranian police forces and demanded an end to such actions by the Iranian government.
- Mohaqeq Damad said, "The establishment of the force for promotion of virtues and prevention of vice is in fact meant to monitor the rulers' actions, not to crack down on the citizens' freedoms and is a deviation from Islamic teachings."
- Chilean president Gabriel Boric, during his speech at the UN General Assembly, paid tribute to Amini and called for an end to the abuse of power by the powerful around the world.
- Selahattin Demirtaş, the imprisoned former Co-chair of the pro-Kurdish Peoples' Democratic Party (HDP) shaved his head together with his cellmate Adnan Mizrakli, the former Mayor of Diyarbakir.
- Several European Union officials have condemned her death. Josep Borrell, the EU foreign policy chief called her death "unacceptable". A spokesperson issued a statement announcing that what happened to Amini is unacceptable and the perpetrators of this killing must be held accountable.
- US President Joe Biden, in the annual speech of world leaders to the United Nations on 21 September, referred to the situation of women in Iran and Amini's death and vowed solidarity with Iranian women.
- Robert Malley, the representative of the US in Iranian affairs, called Amini's death "horrific" and wrote: "Mahsa Amini’s death after injuries sustained in custody for an "improper" hijab is appalling. Our thoughts are with her family. Iran must end its violence against women for exercising their fundamental rights."
- Olaf Scholz, Chancellor of Germany, called Amini's death in police custody "terrible", and expressed his sadness at the deaths of "the brave women" at the protests. He added that women should be able to make their own decisions, and not live in fear.
- On 26 October 2022, women foreign ministers from a dozen nations led by Canada's Melanie Joly jointly condemned Iran's violent crackdown on women's rights. In a joint statement they said: "As women foreign ministers, we feel a responsibility to echo the voices of Iranian women".

==== Celebrities ====
A number of celebrities and others reacted to Amini's death.

- American actress Leah Remini wrote on Twitter: "Killing of Mahsa Amini is unacceptable under any circumstances, but the fact that she was arrested for wearing an inappropriate hijab makes it even more appalling."
- Khaby Lame, an Italian influencer of Senegalese origin, wrote on his Instagram page, "The biggest war for women's rights and human rights is happening in Iran. If you live on earth and remain silent, you will never be able to speak about women's rights again."
- British Iranian comedian and author Shaparak Khorsandi, whose family fled Iran following the revolution, said "The Iranian regime kills women for trying to live freely. This is not just Iran's problem, it is the world's problem. Do not look away. This denial of basic human rights is an affront to human dignity. Mahsa Amini cannot speak up any more. The world should act in solidarity and amplify her voice and the voices of all Iranian women who dare to speak up for choice and democracy".
- Australian actor Nathaniel Buzolic, publishing a picture of Amini on his Instagram, asked: "Where are the feminists? Why is the world silent?"
- Turkish actress Nurgül Yeşilçay published a picture of Amini in her Instagram story and wrote: "It's unfortunate... Alas for all the women in the world."
- J. K. Rowling, author of the Harry Potter novels, posted on Twitter, "Then the rest of the world needs to keep saying her name. #MahsaAmini died aged 22 in police custody because she violated hijab regulations. Solidarity with all Iranians currently protesting."

==== Others ====
- The decentralized hacker group Anonymous claimed to have disrupted several Iranian government and state-affiliated media websites in support of the protests and released a video announcing the group's support of the protests along with footage of the protests.

=== Sanctions ===
Following Amini's death and the associated protests, countries and entities such as the United States, Canada, the United Kingdom, and the European Union sanctioned Iran over human rights violations relating to Amini's death and the subsequent protests.

== Memorials and recognitions ==
=== In the arts ===
- Iranian Australian photographer Hoda Afshar created a series of 12 photographs for a September 2023 exhibition at the Art Gallery of New South Wales in Sydney. Called In Turn, the photographic series features four Iranian Australian women dressed in black and white, plaiting one another's hair, and first holding a white dove and then releasing it. The series is based on a kind of ritualistic practice performed by Kurdish female fighters before setting out to fight Islamic State, and was created as a response to Amini's death.
- The 2023 installment of the PaykanArtCar art project by Simin Keramati was a tribute to Amini.
- Several murals were created of Amini, including in Argentina, Brunswick, Dublin, Edmonton, Haifa, Tel Aviv, Jerusalem, Los Angeles, Melbourne, Sydney, Richmond, San Francisco, Toronto, and Washington D.C.

=== Academic scholarships and awards ===
The following scholarship have been established in memory of Mahsa Amini

- Mahsa Amini Graduate Fellowship at Columbia University in the City of New York School of Engineering and Applied Sciences Eligible students will have lived or studied in Iran and have overcome systemic challenges, such as gender-based or other obstacles, in their academic pursuits. In the absence of eligible students from Iran in any year, the fellowship may be awarded to students who have lived or studied in the following countries: Afghanistan, Algeria, Bahrain, Egypt, Iraq, Jordan, Kuwait, Lebanon, Libya, Morocco, Oman, Pakistan, Qatar, Saudi Arabia, Somalia, Sudan, Syria, Tunisia, Turkey, United Arab Emirates, and Yemen. First scholarship was awarded in 2023.
- Mahsa Amini Graduate Fellowship at University of California Santa Barbara This Fund support qualified graduate students in a UC Santa Barbara doctoral program who have matriculated from an Iranian institution where they received a bachelor’s degree in something other than a STEM discipline. First scholarship was awarded in 2024.
- Women Life Freedom Scholarship at Dalhousie University Eligible candidates are first year masters or PhD at Dalhousie who are from Iran and self-identify as a woman or another equity-deserving gender identity.
- Mahsa Amini Scholarship at University of Windsor In order to qualify, students must be a Masters level or PhD level. A Minimum cumulative average of 80% is required. The scholarship is open to all students, across all Faculties, with a preference to support International Students.
- Mahsa Amini Scholarship at Dawson College Eligible candidates are international students or refugee in financial need or in need of extra financial support. Priority is given to candidates who identify as women or non-binary people.
- Mahsa Jina Amini Fellowship at Cambridge Middle East and North Africa Forum
- The Mahsa Amini Award at Marist College The Mahsa Amini award aims to promote humanity and freedom by supporting freedom activists across the globe, regardless of their nationality, gender, religion, sexual orientation, country of origin, age, political party, etc.
- Dear Elnaz Graduate Fellowship In Memory Of Women, Life and Freedom at University of Alberta From fellowship page: "Elnaz Nabiyi was a passenger of the Ukrainian Airliner Flight PS752 which was shot down by the Islamic Revolutionary Guard Corps of the government of Iran on January 8, 2020. Elnaz, a keen advocate of educational advancement and freedom of choice, was a Ph.D. student at the University of Alberta at the time of the downing of Flight PS752. On September 16, 2022, Mahsa Amini, a 22-year-old Kurdish Iranian girl was killed in the custody of Iran's morality police in Tehran, for not properly wearing a compulsory hijab. In Iran, the slogan "Women, Life, Freedom" was first used at Mahsa's burial and later followed through nationwide protests against the totalitarian regime of Iran."

=== Non-academic scholarships ===
- Mahsa Zhina Amini Fellowship at RadioFreeEurope/RadioLiberty

=== Sakharov Prize ===
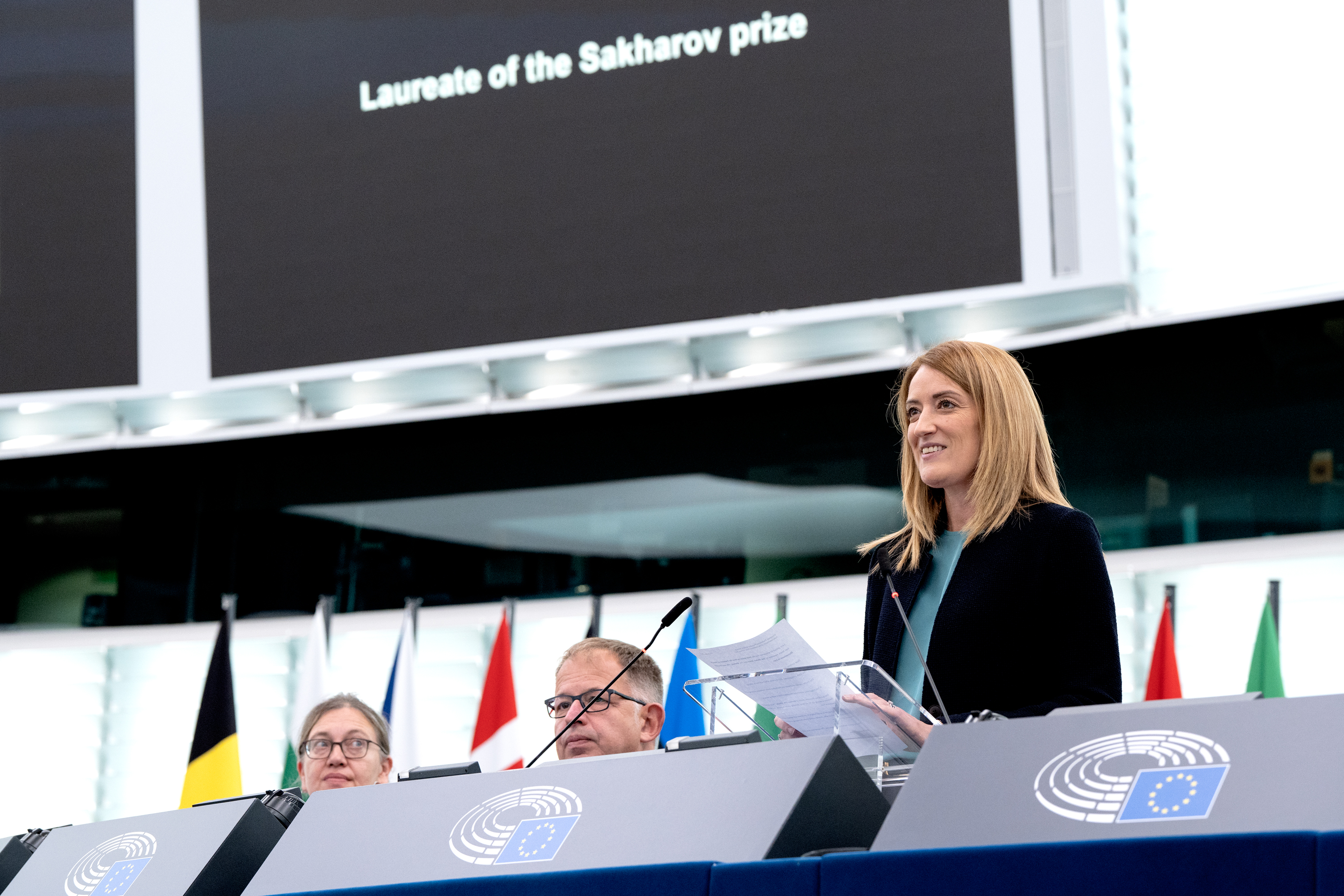
Members of the European Parliament have awarded the 2023 Sakharov Prize for Freedom of Thought to Jina Mahsa Amini and the Woman, Life, Freedom movement

Members of the European Parliament have awarded the 2023 Sakharov Prize for Freedom of Thought to Mahsa Jina Amini and the Woman, Life, Freedom movement. President Roberta Metsola declared:

On 16 September we marked one year since the murder of Jina Mahsa Amini in Iran. The European Parliament proudly stands with the brave and defiant who continue to fight for equality, dignity and freedom in Iran. We stand with those who, even from prison, continue to keep Women, Life and Freedom alive. By choosing them as laureates for the Sakharov Prize for Freedom of Thought 2023, this House remembers their struggle and continues to honour all those who have paid the ultimate price for liberty.

According to their lawyer, Amini's family were prevented from flying to the award ceremony after their passports were confiscated despite holding valid visas.

== Anniversaries and subsequent reactions ==
=== 2023 anniversary ===
On 15 and 16 September 2023, security forces were positioned in Tehran and other cities like Saqqez the birth-place of Mahsa Jina Amini as Iran marked one year since her death. Amini's father was detained while exiting the family home in the western town of Saqqez and then released after being warned not to hold the memorial service. Reports also indicated an increased security presence in other cities in an effort to prevent any unrest. Iranians abroad staged a demonstration in Brussels on Friday and more were expected to be held elsewhere in Europe, in addition to Canada and the United States. The US, along with the European Union and the United Kingdom, separately announced new sanctions on a number of Iranian officials and entities on the eve of Amini's death anniversary.

US President Joe Biden and Secretary of State Antony Blinken said in two separate messages on the occasion of the anniversary of Mahsa Jina Amini's death in the custody of the morality police of Iran that they will continue to stand by the people of Iran. Linda Thomas-Greenfield issued a statement on the occasion of Mahsa Amini's death anniversary, saying:

Mahsa "Gina" Amini's life was tragically cut short, but her courage inspired a movement that will continue against the unprecedented brutality of the Iranian regime. In the months since her death, tens of thousands of ordinary Iranians—led by other brave Iranian women—have come together to protest with a simple message: "Women, life, freedom". Today, the United States announced new sanctions against 29 Iranian individuals and entities involved in repression and violence against protesters, prisoner abuse, and censorship.

=== 2024 anniversary ===
In the lead-up to the second anniversary of Mahsa Amini’s death, more and more women were appearing in public without the mandatory hijab. Mahsa Amini's family planned to perform ceremonies of her death anniversary at her house and also at her grave in Aychi cemetery of Saqqez, but they and people from her birth town were still under pressure from the Iranian government to not perform these ceremonies. On the anniversary day, Iranian security forces detained her father, Amjad Amini, warning the family not to visit her grave or hold a memorial ceremony, while roadblocks and internet restrictions were imposed across Kurdish towns. Despite the heavy security presence and multiple arrests, protests and sporadic clashes erupted in several cities, with demonstrators chanting slogans and human rights groups reporting violence.

==== MAHSA Act 2024 ====
In the United States, the Mahsa Amini Human rights and Security Accountability Act (MAHSA Act) is a bill that was first introduced to the 117th Congress in the wake of the Woman, Life, Freedom protests. Its intention is to put sanctions on the leaders of the Islamic Republic of Iran. The bill was reintroduced as H.R. 589 to the House of Representatives and as S.2626 to the Senate in the 118th Congress.

=== 2026 anniversary ===
On the fourth anniversary of her death, general strikes took place in several cities in western Iran, including Saqqez, Sanandaj, Oshnavieh, Bukan, Paveh, Divandarreh, Kermanshah, and Marivan. Security forces were deployed to several cities, including Saqqez, where they flooded routes to her grave in the Aichi cemetery by releasing water from the Cheragh Veys dam. Twenty people were arrested in Oshnavieh. Additionally, Amnesty International released a 1,000-page report detailing crimes against humanity committed during the crackdown against the Mahsa Amini protests and identifying 87 officials involved in the alleged crimes, including 62 commanders and 10 national-level government officials, among whom were Ali Khamenei, Mohammad Bagheri, and Ahmad Vahidi.

== In popular culture ==
In 2023, Naza Alakija produced the short film Rise, based on Mahsa Amini. The 2024 film The Seed of the Sacred Fig, directed by Mohammad Rasoulof, is set in the midst of the death of Mahsa Amini and the 2022–2023 protests in Iran.

== See also ==
- Aida Rostami
- Chehellom
- Gisuboran
- Hadis Najafi
- Homa Darabi
- Human rights in Iran
- Iranian protests against compulsory hijab
- Iranian schoolgirls mass poisoning reports
- Killing of Neda Agha-Soltan
- Nika Shakarami
- Rage Against the Veil
- Taraneh Mousavi
- Women's rights in Iran
- Zahra Bani Yaghoub
- Zahra Kazemi
