= Saeideh Shafiei =

Story writer and Journalist

- Born: September 15, 1983 (age 42); Tehran, Iran
- Occupations: Story writer and Journalist

Saeideh Shafiei (Persian: سعیده شفیعی) (born 1983) is an Iranian story writer and journalist. She contributes to economic topics in journalism, and her novel 'The Spiral Girl' (In Persian: Dokhtar-e Pich) has been published. Recognized as a laureate of the International Festival of Press and News Agencies, Shafiei was arrested at the same time as the Mahsa Amini protests, which are known as the 'Women, Life, Freedom' movement and occurred following the death of Mahsa Amini.

== Biography ==
Saeideh Shafiei was born in 1983 in Tehran. She holds a bachelor's degree in economics from Allameh Tabataba'i University in Tehran and a master's degree in energy economics from the Islamic Azad University, Tehran Central Branch.

== Writing and Journalism ==
This story writer is the author of the novel 'The Spiral Girl' (In Persian: Dokhtar-e Pich), published in 2017 by Nashre-Cheshmeh Publishing House. In addition to her novels, she has contributed numerous works in the form of articles, notes, reports, and interviews on macroeconomics and energy economics in various media outlets. Some of the platforms include Shargh newspaper, Donya-ye Eqtesad, Iran Farda, Ensaf News, Ermaghan Bidari, Ettelaat-e Siyasi-Eqtesadi, ILNA, Iran Development newspaper, and more.

== Detention ==
On January 22, 2023, Saeideh Shafiei was arrested by the intelligence organization of the Islamic Revolutionary Guard Corps (Sepah) at her residence and was transferred to Evin Prison. This journalist and writer were accused of "assembly and collusion against national security", and "propaganda against the regime". After 18 days of temporary detention, she was released on bail of five hundred million tomans (approximately US$12,150) pending a court hearing.

== Conviction ==
The trial for the charges against Saeideh Shafiei, Nasim Sultan Beigi, and Mehrnoosh Zarei Hanzaki took place on Tuesday, July 3, 2023 in Branch 26 of the Tehran Revolutionary Court, presided over by Judge Iman Afshari. With Iman Afshari's verdict, the judge of Branch 26 of the Tehran Revolutionary Court sentenced Saeideh Shafiei and Nasim Sultan Beigi to three years and seven months in prison for "assembly and collusion against national security" and eight months in prison for " propaganda against the regime." In total, they each were sentenced to four and a half years of imprisonment.

Saeideh Shafiei and Nasim Sultan Beigi's objection to the harsh verdict was also confirmed in the appellate court.

Moreover, under this verdict, they will not be eligible for amnesty as outlined in the "pardon and commutation" directive issued in February 2023. Despite multiple legal flaws, their request for a retrial was also rejected by the Supreme Court. Saeideh Shafiei was sent to Evin Prison on November 19, 2023, to serve a harsh sentence due to her journalistic activities.

== Reactions ==
The spokesperson for the U.S. Department of State criticized the Islamic Republic's pressure on journalists. In response to a question about the recent verdict issued by the Revolutionary Court against Saeideh Shafiei and Nasim Sultan Beigi, two female journalists, Matthew Miller deplored "the Iranian regime’s continued crackdown on journalists for engaging in acts of journalism, oftentimes with baseless and completely discredited allegation[s]." The regime's actions, he said, "remain a violation of their human rights, something the world continues to watch."

Human Rights Watch, in response to the trial, declared that the charges against these three journalists should be dropped.

Reporters Without Borders described the heavy sentences imposed on Saeideh Shafiei and Nasim Sultan Beigi as the government's retaliation against journalists and condemned the Islamic Republic for this action.

In this regard, also, the International Federation of Journalists (IFJ) General Secretary Anthony Bellanger said: "We are extremely concerned about the fate of our colleagues in jail and the authorities' relentless attempts to tighten their grip on media and journalists. We demand all journalists’ immediate release and urge the Iranian leaders to establish real conditions for democracy in the country."

== Achievements ==
Saeideh Shafiei was introduced as a selected author in the articles section of the fourth Festival of Press and News Agencies.
