= Saba Kord Afshari =

Iranian women's rights protester

Saba Kord Afshari (Persian: صبا کردافشاری) is an Iranian political prisoner. She appeared without a head scarf in public, in defiance of Iran’s compulsory hijab laws, and posted a video about it on social media.

== Arrest ==
She was arrested on 2 August 2018 and subsequently sentenced to one year in prison on the charge of “disrupting the public order” at Branch 28 of Tehran’s Revolutionary Court led by Judge Moghiseh. She was released on 14 February 2019 when Ali Khamenei pardoned a large number of prisoners. Following her release, Afshari, Maryam Akbari Monfared and Yasaman Aryani wrote a letter denouncing prison conditions in Iran.

On June 1, 2019, Ms. Kord Afshari was rearrested; her trial was held on August 19, 2019. Her mother Raheleh Ahmadi was also arrested. On September 26, 2019, she was sentenced by Branch 26 of the Revolutionary Court of Tehran, presided over by Judge Iman Afshari. Her sentences included 15 years of imprisonment on the charge of “promoting corruption and prostitution through appearing without a headscarf in public” 1 year and 6 months in prison on the charge of “propaganda against the state” and 7 years and 6 months in prison on the charge of ” assembly and collusion with an intent to commit a crime against the national security”, which adds up to a total of 24 years in prison. In December 2019, the Tehran Court of Appeals reduced her sentence to 9 years, 7.5 of which are imposable by law. Her sentence was later reduced to 5 years.

In December 2020 she was transferred from Evin prison to Qarchak women’s prison. While there, she suffered from several health conditions, such as chronic ulcers, and had trouble receiving treatment for them. She contracted COVID-19 at least once.

On February 8, 2023, months after the Mahsa Amini protests, she was released from prison as part of a mass amnesty commemorating the Iranian Revolution.

== International Response ==
The 118th Congress condemned the Iranian regime for its treatment of "Saba Kord Afshari, who was sentenced to 15 years in prison for posting videos to social media without a hijab and transferred into Ward 6 of the notorious Qarchak Women's Prison." The condemnation was bipartisan and almost universal.

In March 2023, the UN Working Group on Arbitrary Detention ruled that her detention was in violation of international law.

== See also ==
- 2017–19 Iranian protests against compulsory hijab
