= Marjan Davari =

Iranian researcher, translator and writer (born 1966)

- مرجان داوری
- Born: 24 April 1966 (age 60); Tehran, Iran
- Citizenship: Iranian
- Education: Alzahra University (B.A.)
- Occupations: Researcher, translator, writer
- Writing career
- Language: Persian
- Genres: Philosophy, Psychology, Esoteric, Theological sciences, Ontology, Metaphysics

Marjan Davari (b. April 24, 1966; Tehran, Iran) (Persian: مرجان داوری) is an Iranian researcher, translator and writer who has been studying, teaching, translating and researching new age material, philosophical and metaphysical texts for more than 26 years.

Marjan was arrested at her father's home on September 23, 2015, in Karaj and has been held in a women's jail, Qarchak prison (زندان قرچک), She subsequently was sentenced to death for promoting new age cults and movements from eastern cultures such as Tibetan Buddhism, Hinduism, and Eckankar.

== Education and work ==
She finished elementary school in UK and after returning to Iran attended an international Parthian school. She received an English translation diploma when she was 13 and continued her studies in graphic design and painting at Alzahra University alongside research and translation of inner-science, eastern and western ontology.

Her published translated works include Talons of Time by Paul Twitchell, The Seeker of Phil Morimitsu and The Spiritual Exercises of ECK by Harold Klemp.

She concentrated solely on inner-science and eastern ontology and worked as a researcher and teacher of metaphysics at the Rah-e Ma’refat (Road of Wisdom) institute. She considers herself a free researcher in the field of esoteric science and metaphysics. She was also a teacher at Rah-e Ma’refat institute.

Her collected works and writings were kept in an archive but have since been confiscated by security forces.

== Arrest and trial ==
Davari was arrested at her father's home in Mehr Shahr in Karaj in September 2015. She was held in solitary confinement in Evin Prison’s ward 209 for three months with no access to a lawyer. She was then transferred to the women’s ward.

She was charged with conspiracy against the Islamic regime, being a member of Eckankar, spreading corruption on earth, having a love affair and insulting the Supreme Leader of Iran.

In March and October 2016 there was interrogation and hearings in the Islamic Revolutionary Court presided over by Judge Abolqasem Salavati. In February 2017 she was transferred to the women’s prison in Qarchak (زندان قرچک) and on 12 March was sentenced to death for blasphemy with an additional 16 months for insulting Supreme Leader Ali Khamenei by the 15th branch of the Islamic Revolutionary Court in Tehran. presided over by Judge Abolqasem Salavati.

== International response ==
In March 2017 Red T, a nonprofit organization dedicated to the protection of translators and interpreters, published an open letter to Ali Khamenei with the subject "No Death for Content - Free Translator Marjan Davari".

On 16 March 2017, Marjan's supporters started an online petition at Change.org to raise awareness about her condition and urging Amnesty International to take appropriate action to stop the execution of Marjan Davari. This petition, available in most common languages including English, French, German, Italian, Spanish, Japanese, Chinese, Dutch and Persian, was signed by 30,068 supporters.

== See also ==
- Nazanin Zaghari-Ratcliffe
- Ghoncheh Ghavami
- Atena Daemi
- Narges Mohammadi
- Arash Sadeghi
- Mohammad Ali Taheri
- List of Iranian women prisoners and detainees
