= Soheil Arabi =

Iranian blogger

- Born: Soheil Arabi; 21 August 1985 (age 41)
- Known for: Being arrested for activist blogging

Soheil Arabi (Persian: سهیل عربی; born 21 August 1985), is an Iranian blogger who was sentenced to death in Iran in 2013 on charges of insulting the Islamic prophet Muhammad in his postings on Facebook about Atena Daemi. His sentence was commuted in 2015 to several years imprisonment and two years of mandatory study of Islamic theology. On 2 January 2023, Arabi was reportedly re-arrested by security forces.

Arabi is a Press Freedom Prize Winner, an award created by Reporters Without Borders, which honours courageous and independent journalists who have faced threats or imprisonment for their work and who have challenged the abuse of power.

== Arrest, trial, death sentence, commutation of sentence ==
Islamic Revolutionary Guard Corps (IRGC) agents arrested Arabi at his home in Tehran in November 2013. He then spent two months in the IRGC's Ward 2-A in Evin Prison. During interrogation, he was pressured into confessing his alleged crimes. He was then transferred to Section 350 of Evin, which is under control of the Iranian judiciary. On 30 August 2014, a five-judge panel of Branch 76 of the Criminal Court of Tehran sentenced Arabi to death for "insulting the Prophet of Islam" in eight Facebook accounts allegedly belonging to Arabi.

On 4 September 2014, Branch 15 of the Tehran Revolutionary Court also sentenced Arabi to three years in prison on charges of "insulting the Supreme Leader" and "propaganda against the state" in his postings on Facebook.

In late September 2015, his death sentence was commuted to "reading 13 religious books and studying theology for two years" by a higher court. It was the first time that such a decision to commute a death sentence had occurred in the Islamic Republic of Iran, where an unknown number of people are on death row for blasphemy, heresy or other religious offences.

== Hunger strikes ==
Atheist Republic demanding Arabi's release (August 2019)

In August 2017, Arabi went on a hunger strike to protest IRGC harassment of his wife and relatives.

In protesting the assault and battery of civil activists, Atena Daemi and Golrokh Ebrahimi Iraee, Soheil once again went on hunger strike. On January 26, 2018, his mother, Farangis Mazloom, confirmed the hunger strike in an interview with Radio Farda. Agents of the Greater Tehran Prison severely beat Soheil Arabi to force him to end his hunger strike. They dealt severe blows to his head.

In April 2019, Soheil Arabi was seriously hurt when he defended a few ordinary prisoners against mistreatment and beating by guards. It was claimed he urgently needed to have a surgery.

This was the third time Soheil Arabi went on hunger strike, this time to protest poor prison conditions, violent mistreatment of prisoners by prison guards and officials, and various deprivations in prison. Civil activist Soheil Arabi was taken to the dispensary of Fashafouyeh Prison (a.k.a. the Greater Tehran's Penitentiary) after his health critically deteriorated since 15 June 2019, when he went on hunger strike. He went on hunger strike because his repeated requests to provide for his needs had gone unheeded by prison authorities. He was transferred to the dispensary on 20 June 2019.

== Reactions ==
CEMB demanding Arabi's release (December 2014)

Human Rights Watch (HRW) has called for Iran's judiciary to vacate Arabi's death sentence. HRW's deputy Middle East and North Africa director said, "It is simply shocking that anyone should face the gallows simply because of Internet postings that are deemed to be crude, offensive, or insulting. Iran should urgently revise its penal code to eliminate provisions that criminalize peaceful free expression, especially when they punish its exercise with death."

Amnesty International has also called on its supporters to urge the Iranian authorities not to execute Arabi and release him "if he is being held solely for peacefully exercising his right to freedom of expression."

The online freethought community Atheist Republic announced plans to hold protests on 17 August 2019 in various locations across the world, demanding Arabi's release using the #FreeSoheil hashtag.

== Re-arrest ==
On 2 January 2023, Arabi was "re-arrested, violently beaten and denied medicine in his own home", according to the Freedom From Religion Foundation. He was beaten so badly during his arrest that he "had a heart attack and was taken to hospital", according to the Council of Ex-Muslims of Britain. As of 7 January 2023, he was reportedly being held in Fashafouyeh Prison, near Tehran.

On 16 August 2026, the Tehran Revolutionary court sentenced Arabi to five years in prison on charges of "gathering and collusion with the intention of committing crimes against the country’s security". The sentence was upheld by branch 36 of the Tehran Court of Appeal on 17 October.
