= Maryam Akbari Monfared =

Supporter of the People's Mojahedin of Iran (born 1976)

- مریم اکبری منفرد
- Born: December 14, 1976 (age 49); Iran
- Occupation: Human rights activist
- Organization: Supporter of the People's Mojahedin of Iran
- Known for: Political prisoner, human rights activism
- Criminal penalty: 15 years imprisonment for moharebeh ("enmity against God")
- Criminal status: Imprisoned in Qarchak Prison
- Children: 3

Maryam Akbari Monfared (Persian: مریم اکبری منفرد; born 14 December 1976) is a supporter of the People's Mojahedin of Iran. Three of her brothers and one of her sisters were executed during the 1988 mass executions in Iran.She is mother of the three

== Arrest and Prison ==
Monfared was arrested on 31 December 2009 and was forcibly disappeared for five months. She was detained in solitary confinement for the first 43 days of her imprisonment, and interviewed without access to a lawyer. The lawyer assigned to her by the Iranian government only met and spoke to her during the trial, which consisted of a single hearing of less than one hour. She was sentenced to 15 years in prison by the Branch 15 Revolutionary Court in Tehran in May 2010, which condemned her for "enmity against God" (moharebeh). The UN Working Group on Forced or Involuntary Disappearances called on Iran to investigate the disappeared relatives of Maryam Akbari Monfared to find out their fate.

She has three daughters, her youngest was a just toddler when she was imprisoned. She has been named a prisoner of conscience by Amnesty International as her conviction is solely based on an arbitrary interference with her privacy, family and correspondence. Akbari Monfared, despite serving a decade in prison, has not been allowed a single day of furlough so far, and she has not been allowed to attend the weddings nor funerals of her relatives. She has faced discrimination in prison from the prison guards and at times refused medical treatment.

In August 2025, human rights organizations reported that Akbari Monfared’s health was in immediate danger due to prolonged power outages, extreme summer heat, lack of access to potable water, and denial of adequate medical care in Qarchak Prison. Despite suffering from chronic illnesses, she has been denied transfer to external medical facilities. These conditions were described as part of a broader deterioration affecting all female detainees in the facility.

== International calls ==
Even while detained, Maryam campaigns and raises her voice by publishing open letters about prison conditions for women. Also while in prison, she filed a formal complaint demanding truth and justice for her siblings and several thousand political prisoners who were victims of extrajudicial executions in 1988. As a result, she has been threatened with an extended prison sentence and denied medical care.

On October 10, 2018, she and three other prisoners, Golrokh Ebrahimi Iraee and Atena Daemi wrote a letter addressed to the United Nations Special Rapporteur Javaid Rehman, asking him to come to Iran to witness violations of human rights occurring in the country in person.

== See also ==
- Human rights in the Islamic Republic of Iran
- Human Rights Activists in Iran
