= Raheleh Ahmadi =

Iranian political prisoner

Raheleh Ahmadi is an Iranian political prisoner and the mother of Saba Kord Afshari. She was arrested on 10 July 2019 after protesting the arrest and treatment of her daughter, who had been arrested a month earlier for protesting Iran's compulsory hijab law.

== Arrest and charges ==
Ahmadi's daughter, Saba Kord Afshari was arrested on 1 June 2019 for participating in the White Wednesdays protest against Iran's compulsory hijab law. According to the National Council of Resistance of Iran, Ahmnadi was arrested to pressure, "her daughter Saba Kord Afshari because she has refused to do video confessions in recent weeks. According to some sources, Ms. Ahmadi has been told that she will only be released when her daughter confesses in front of the camera." Prison authorities had previously tried to pressure Afshari into confessing while holding her in solitary confinement.

Ahmadi was sentenced to 4 years 2 months in prison on "conspiracy and collusion against national security." She was acquitted of “encouraging people to immorality or prostitution,” the charge often given to women who don't wear the hijab in Iran. Her sentence was later reduced to 2 years 7 months in prison.

== Imprisonment and health concerns ==
She was being held in Evin prison. There was significant concern about her health while imprisoned. In March 2020, she suffered an ear infection. After her mother died in July 2021, her lumbar disc pain worsened, leaving her unable to walk unassisted. She also has a thyroid condition which makes her more vulnerable to infections. On 16 February 2022, she was put on medical furlough after contracting COVID-19. During the pandemic, there was concern about limited access to medical services in the women's section of Evin prison and that prison authorities in Iran were depriving political prisoners of medical care.

She and her daughter were released in February 2023.

== International response ==
Freedom Now filed a petition to the Working Group on Arbitrary Detention on behalf of Ahmadi and Afshari. The Working Group found their detention to be in violation of international law.
