= Iman Afshari =

Iranian judge of the Branch 26 of the Islamic Revolutionary Court

Presiding Judge of Branch 26 of the Islamic Revolutionary Court of Tehran
- Incumbent
- Assumed office 2018-2019

Iman Afshari (Persian: ایمان افشاری) is an Iranian judge who presides over Branch 26 of the Islamic Revolutionary Court in Tehran, part of a parallel court system that tries political and national-security cases in Iran.

News reports, rights groups and governments have linked him to long prison terms imposed on labour activists, political dissidents, and members of religious minorities, and, according to The Washington Post citing the activist news agency HRANA, to one death sentence during the 2022 protests, in which an appeal was later accepted. He was added to the United Kingdom sanctions list in December 2022, which cited fair-trial and freedom-of-expression violations against political protesters, and was designated by the European Union in January 2026 as part of the Iranian sanctions, which cited involvement in the violent repression of protests and in arbitrary arrests of activists.

== Judicial career ==
Afshari is the presiding judge of Branch 26 of the Islamic Revolutionary Court of Tehran. According to Iran Human Rights Society, he received a religious seminary (hawza) education. He began working at Branch 26 in the winter of 2018–2019. A September 2024 opinion article published by the Foundation for Defense of Democracies similarly stated that he had held the position for approximately six years.

The New Yorker described him in 2026 as "known in Tehran for his tough sentences". The Washington Post named him among a small group of Revolutionary Court judges reported to have issued death sentences during the crackdown on the 2022 protests. Alhurra named him as one of four judges recurring in cases involving political executions.

== Reported rulings ==
According to the Center for Human Rights in Iran, Afshari presided over the February 2019 trial of labour activist As'ad Behnam Ebrahimzadeh (Persian: اسعد ابراهیم‌زاده), which Ebrahimzadeh said lasted ten minutes and was conducted without his lawyer. He was convicted of "propaganda against the state" and "membership in illegal organizations" and sentenced to one and five years' imprisonment respectively; under Article 134 of the Islamic Penal Code, (Note: Article 134 provides that, in cases involving multiple ta'zir offenses, separate punishments are imposed for the offenses but "only the most severe punishment shall be executed".) only the longer five-year sentence was to be served, subject to appeal.

Afshari also imposed a further one-year prison sentence, with a ban on political membership and a travel ban, on the activist Golrokh Iraee, who the United States Commission on International Religious Freedom said was neither present at the hearing nor given access to a lawyer. The commission's chair, Gayle Manchin, called it an "outrageous and unwarranted punishment".

In November 2022, Afshari sentenced two Baháʼí leaders, Mahvash Sabet and Fariba Kamalabadi, both former members of the Baháʼí 7, to ten years' imprisonment each after a trial that USCIRF and Radio Free Europe/Radio Liberty reported had lasted about an hour. Each had already served a decade in prison in an earlier case concerning their work for the Baháʼí community.

The Washington Post, based on accounts from HRANA, reported that Afshari issued one death sentence during the 2022 protests, and that Iran's high court later accepted an appeal in the case, a finding the paper attributed to the "Volunteer Committee to Follow Up on the Situation of Detainees".

== Sanctions ==
On 9 December 2022, the United Kingdom added Afshari to its sanctions list under reference IRN0112. The UK statement of reasons said that, as presiding judge of Branch 26, he had been "involved in the commission of serious human rights violations in Iran", specifically violations of the right to a fair trial and of political protesters' right to freedom of expression.

On 29 January 2026, the Council of the European Union designated Afshari under its Iran human rights sanctions regime, alongside the interior minister Eskandar Momeni and the prosecutor general Mohammad Movahedi Azad. The Council said those listed had been involved in the "violent repression of peaceful protests" and in the arbitrary arrest of activists and human rights defenders.

== See also ==
- Abolqasem Salavati
- Human rights in the Islamic Republic of Iran
