= Gisuboran =

Mourning ritual and protest

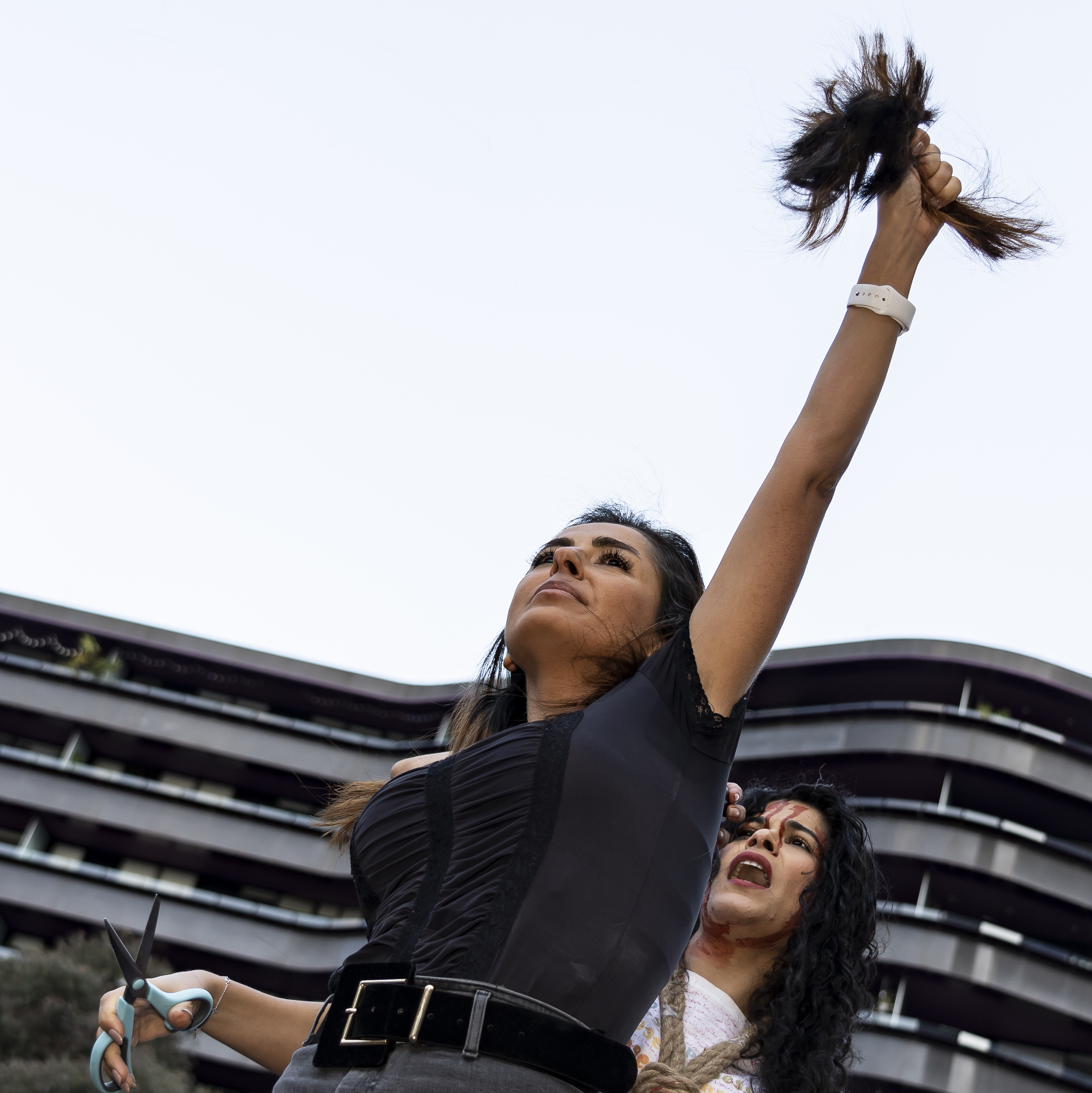
A protester in Australia holding her cut hair in solidarity with the Mahsa Amini protests

Gisuborān meaning haircutting (Persian: گیسوبران) is one of the mourning rituals in Iranian culture. This ritual gives a sad and emotional state to mourning. In 2022 women in Iran and later internationally used haircutting as a protest against the treatment of women in Iran. The BBC included an unknown woman cutting her hair as one of their 100 Women in 2022.

== In Persian literature ==
In Shahnameh, written by Ferdowsi, Farangis cut her hair because of her husband's unjust death, named Siyâvash.

This ritual has also been reflected in poems of Hafez, Khaghani and Salman Savaji.

Modern writers like Simin Daneshvar have used this ritual on their metaphors. Simin writes in savushun about a tree named "Gisu tree" (the hair tree) from which women would hang their cut hair.

== In culture of Iranic ethnics ==
This ritual is alive in culture of Bakhtiari people. Bakhtiari women cut their hair during the mourning ceremony of their elders and trample their hair on the way to the cemetery (to bury the dead). Bakhtiari People call this ritual "Pal Borun". "Pal" means "long hair" and "borun"(cognate with "boran" in Persian) means "cutting". They also have poems that they recite while performing this ceremony.

The Kurds of Iran and the Iranian Lors who are close to them, know this ritual by the name of "Chamar". The dead body is placed in a tent and a horse is decorated and its reins are given to one of the relatives of the died to move towards the tent. As soon as the horse approaches the tent, people start crying and they play a sad song with an instrument called "Chamariyone", which is a type of trumpet, and women cut their hair. These rituals are similar to what was done in the Shahnameh in the story of Siavash's death. The act of "cutting" in this ritual is also known as "Kol".

== Gisuboran for Mahsa Amini ==
During Iran's nationwide protests 2022, a number of Iranian women cut their hair in a symbolic gesture to protest the death of Mahsa Amini after being arrested by the morality police. Some men also did so to support women.

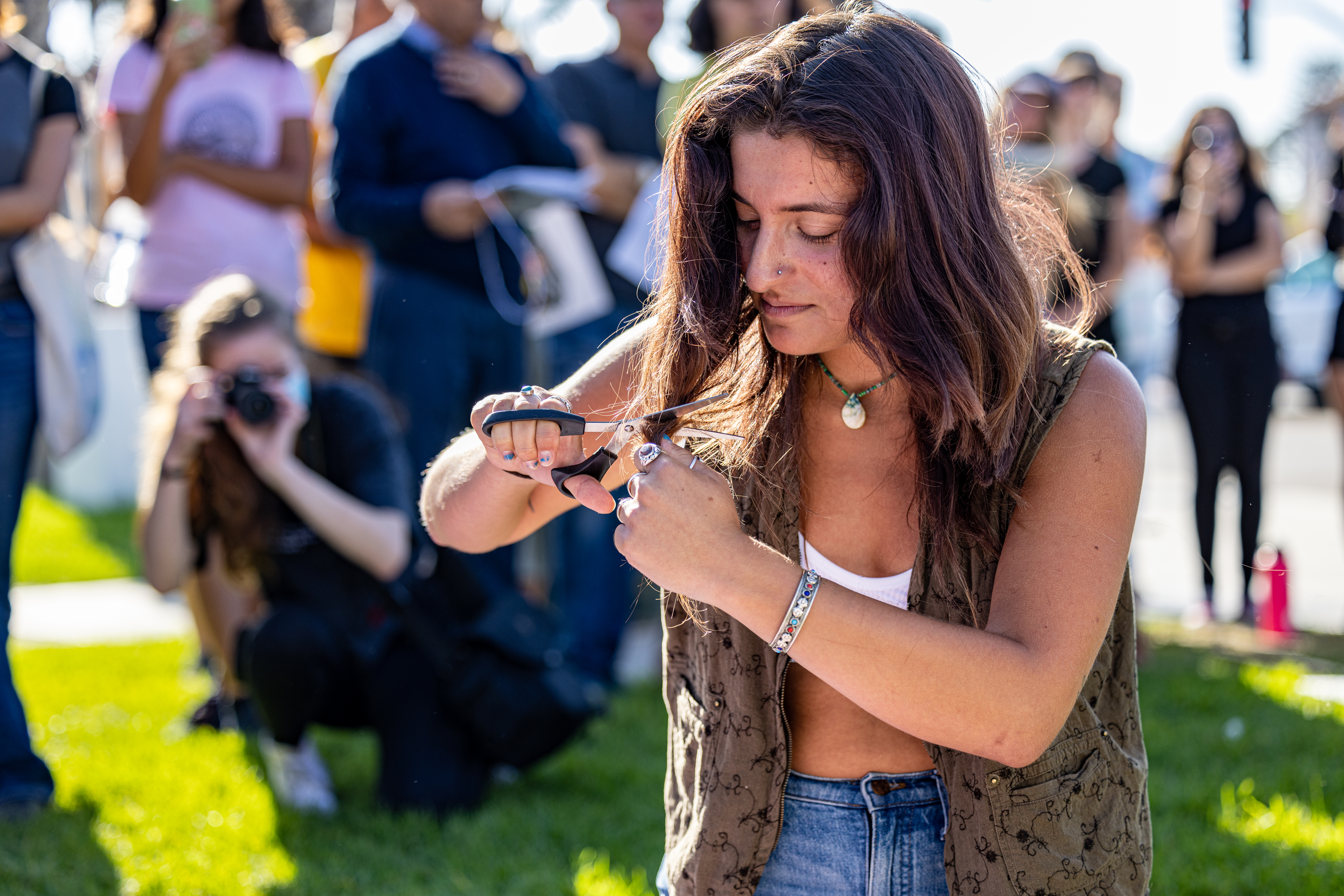
Gisuboran at a protest rally after the killing of Mahsa Amini, Santa Barbara, California

=== International reaction ===
Users of TikTok and other platforms performed this ritual to sympathize with Iranians.

- Italy: AleXsandro Palombo, an Italian artist, drew the character Marge Simpson with cut hair on the wall of the Iranian Embassy in Milan. Visitors of the MAXXI Museum in Rome cut off strands of their hair and placed them in a box to be delivered to the Iranian Embassy in Rome as a symbol of solidarity with Iranian women. "They need to know that they are not alone," said Giovanna Melandri, head of the museum; "They should know that what they want are basic human rights."
- France: French actress Juliette Binoche, along with dozens of famous French actresses and singers, cut their hair in support of the Iranian people. By publishing a video of herself and other actors cutting their hair, she wrote on her Instagram account: "In solidarity, for the right to freedom for Iranian men and women." Isabelle Adjani, Jane Birkin, Charlotte Gainsbourg, Isabelle Hupert, Isabelle Carre, Barbara Pravi, Julie Gayet, Angel are among the artists who appear in this video along with a number of women's rights activists.
- Syria: Syrian Kurdish women cut their hair and burned their scarves in protest against Mahsa Amini's death.
- Turkey: Melek Mosso, Turkish musician and music teacher, cut her hair in support of Iranian women during the concert. She said:"I am performing tonight's concert for women everywhere. No one can take away our freedom."

The BBC included an unknown woman cutting her hair as one of their 100 Women in 2022.
