= Naza Alakija =

Iranian humanitarian and producer

Nazanin Jafarian
- Born: Nazanin Jafarian; February 1989 (age 37)
- Education: University of Manchester; Queen Mary University of London
- Occupations: Activist, filmmaker
- Website: Official website

Naza Alakija (born Nazanin Jafarian in 1989) is a former model, philanthropist, socialite and filmmaker.

== Biography ==
Alakija was born in February 1989. Originally from Iran, her family relocated to England when she was nine, settling in Cheshire. Alakija graduated with a Bachelor of Science (BSc) from the University of Manchester in 2010. She later pursued a Master of Arts (MA) in International Relations and Affairs.

In 2017, Naza married Folarin Alakija, the son of Nigerian oil billionaire Folorunso Alakija. The wedding received wide attention for its opulence, which was held at Blenheim Palace with an estimated cost of up to $8 million.

In 2019, Alakija founded SAGE Innovation Centre to advocate for climate change and women's rights. Alakija also supports a project that operates mobile library buses in Afghanistan.

=== Filmmaking ===
Alakija later turned to filmmaking, using film to advocate for environmental and social causes. The 2022 climate change documentary Overheated was produced by Maggie Baird and Naza Alakija, under the director Yassa Khan. In 2023, Alakija produced Rise, a short film about the death of Mahsa Amini. The film features Yasaman Mohsani portraying Amini.
