= Mahvash Sabet =

Iranian poet and former educator (born 1953)

- Persian: مهوش ثابت
- Born: Mahvash Shahriari Sabet; February 4, 1953 (age 72); Ardestan, Isfahan, Iran
- Occupations: Poet and educator
- Known for: Trial for the crime of "spying for Israel", "blasphemy" and propaganda against the Islamic Republic of Iran

Mahvash Shahriari Sabet (Persian: مهوش شهریاری ثابت; born February 4, 1953 in Ardestan, Isfahan) better known as Mahvash Sabet (Persian: مهوش ثابت) is an Iranian poet and former educator. She was one of the Bahá'i Seven, a group of seven Bahá'i community leaders arrested by the Iranian government.

In 2010, she was sentenced to twenty years in prison, and to another ten years in 2023. Human rights organizations have reported that she has serious health conditions and underwent open heart surgery, though she was expected to continue serving a ten year prison sentence. Before her arrest, she worked as a teacher and school principal but was dismissed after the 1979 Islamic Revolution because of her Bahá’í faith.

== Education and Career ==
Sabet was born in Ardestan, Iran. When she was in the fifth grade, her family moved to Tehran.

She graduated college with a bachelor's degree in psychology.

She began her professional career as a teacher, before later working as a principal at several schools and collaborating with the National Literacy Committee of Iran. After the Iranian Revolution, she was barred from working in public education due to her faith.

== Religious activity ==
Sabet became the director of the Bahá'í Institute for Higher Education, where she worked for 15 years.

In 2006, Sabet was asked to become a leader of Iran's Bahá'í community. She and six other leaders "tended to the spiritual and social needs of the Iranian Baha’i community given the absence of formally elected Baha’i leadership". At that time, Baha’i administrative and educational activities were considered illegal by Iranian authorities.

== Writing ==
She began writing poetry while in prison, Sabet wrote poems about her experiences on scraps of paper, napkins, and paper towels, which were then given to family members during visits. Initially, she wrote poetry for her family, but with time Sabet began using poetry as a way to express and process her emotions, with it becoming a "means of survival".

In 2011, some of her poems were shared with Bahiyyih Nakhjavani, a relative living in the United Kingdom, who translated some of the poems into English. In 2013, 70 of Sabet's poems were compiled and released as a book, titled Prison Poems. Then, two more volumes of her poetry were published : Raha (a Tale of Love -More Prison Poems) in 2019 and Hekaya-e Asheghi (Love Story) in 2021.

PEN International recognized Sabet as an "International Writer of Courage" in 2017, and she received honorary membership in the PEN organizations of Austria and Denmark.

== Arrests and imprisonments ==
Sabet was first arrested in 2005 on the day of her daughter's wedding, but was released after questioning.

On March 5, 2008, Sabet was detained while visiting Mashhad, becoming the first of the Baháʼí Seven to be arrested. She was kept in Raja’i Shahr Prison, and later in Qarchak Prison in Varamin. In February 2009, she was charged with spying for Israel, propaganda against the Islamic Republic, insulting sacred sites, and establishment of an illegal administration. In June 2010, she and the rest of the Baháʼí Seven were tried, convicted, and given sentences of 20 years in prison. The group was represented by Shirin Ebadi during her trial, who said that there was "not a shred of evidence" for the crimes which they were charged with. In September 2010, it was reported that Sabet's sentence was reduced to 10 years in prison after an appeals court reportedly dropped the "espionage" charges.

Sabet was held in Tehran's Evin Prison for the duration of her sentence. While in Evin, she developed tuberculosis and osteoporosis, for which she was allowed a five-day furlough in October 2016 to pursue treatment. In 2011, Sabat was included in a series of Dutch postage stamps recognizing victims of human rights abuses in Iran. In 2012, it was reported that Sabet broke her hip while imprisoned and was not allowed to take medical leave from prison. In 2016, the Baháʼí 7 were informed that their sentences had been reduced to ten years, in light of a 2013 penal code reform. On an unspecified date, Sabet's sentence was reduced to 10 years in prison based on Article 134 of Iran's Penal Code.

She was released on September 18, 2017, a day earlier than scheduled.

Sabet was arrested again on July 31, 2022. At the time, she was at a friend's house in northern Iran while recovering from COVID-19. A statement released after her arrest accused her and other detainees of "participating in groups to act against national security through teaching and preaching the Baha’i faith to children in kindergartens, [and] agitating against Islamic Sharia through holding coaching courses". She was beaten during interrogations, according to her daughter, and kept in solitary confinement for 42 days. She was then transferred to Evin's Ward 209, and, five months later, to the women's political-ideological ward of Evin Prison. On November 21, 2023, she was sentenced to another ten year prison sentence in Evin Prison after an hour-long trial shared with Fariba Kamalabadi, another member of the Baháʼí 7.

In 2015, during her first imprisonment, and again in 2023 her second incarceration, members of the European Parliament expressed concern over Mahvah Sabet’s imprisonment, such as Cornelia Ernst, then Chair of the European Parliament’s Delegations for Relations with Iran.

In December 2024, Sabet was sent to a hospital for urgent medical treatment after her health deteriorated significantly. She was later temporarily released after undergoing open-heart surgery, in order to recover at home. According to her family, among many other health complications, Sabet is suffering from pulmonary fibrosis and heart issues. PEN International remains gravely concerned about the sharp deterioration in Sabet’s health and calls for her not to be returned to prison.

== Family ==
Shahriyari married her husband, Siyvash Sabet, on May 21, 1973. The couple has a son and a daughter. Sabet's daughter moved to Australia in 2017, and as of 2022 she lives in Sydney with her daughter.

== See also ==
- Baháʼí 7
- Baháʼí Faith
- Prisoner of conscience
- Persecution of Baháʼís
