= Aida Rostami =

Iranian physician (died 2022)

- Born: c. 1986
- Died: December 12, 2022; Tehran
- Cause of death: Killed by Iran security forces
- Known for: Healthcare activism related to the Mahsa Amini protests

Aida Rostami (Persian: آیدا رستمی; c. 1986 – Monday, December 12, 2022) was a 36-year-old Iranian physician who was allegedly kidnapped, fatally beaten, and killed by security forces of the Islamic Republic of Iran for treating protesters who were injured during the Mahsa Amini protests. In light of rising demands and threats on Iranian hospitals and medics to assist security forces in the middle of the protests, Aida Rostami has emerged as an inspirational figure among medics associated with the Mahsa Amini protests.

== Background ==
There were nationwide protests in Iran following the death of 22-year-old woman, Mahsa Amini, who was arrested and killed while in the custody of the Guidance Patrol, the religious morality police of Iran's government, on September 16, 2022. During these protests, Islamic Republic security forces killed hundreds of protestors and detained and wounded thousands more. Iranians injured by security forces during protests avoid seeking care in the country's increasingly dangerous hospitals for fear of being arrested, tortured, prosecuted, or murdered. Medics willing to take risks to assist the wounded are treating protestors at their workplaces, demonstrators' houses, or elsewhere. Rostami was treating demonstrators in Tehran's Ekbatan and other western districts of Tehran.

== Incident ==
On the evening of Monday, December 12, 2022, at 7:00 p.m., Rostami called her mother from the Chamran Hospital, where she was employed. She asked her mother if she needed anything on her way home. However, she did not come home. The next day, her family received a call from the police station located in the Ekbatan neighborhood of Tehran, requesting that they come to the station. They received a letter notifying them that Aida Rostami had died as the result of an accident and instructing them to get her dead body from the Forensics Office. Her family saw that her body with a smashed face, a broken arm, and an enucleated left eye. According to the Forensics death report, the cause of death was being hit by a hard object. When asked about the unexplained hard item, they said that details will be provided later. "The medical examiner told her family that they were ordered not to reveal the true cause of Aida's death. They said that she did not die in a car accident, they killed her." Local sources who examined her dead body told the IranWire on December 16. A member of her family told IranWire, "It is not possible that when you are driving and you get an accident, both of your hands would break, your lower torso gets bruised, and your eye completely comes out."

On December 16, 2022, Mizan, the news agency of the Islamic Republic of Iran's judicial system, said that Aida Rostami's lover threw her down a bridge. Iranian authorities have frequently adopted similar storylines for young women who died during the Mahsa Amini protests, such as Nika Shakarami.

== Responses ==
On December 19, 2022, an alliance of german medical organizations condemned the "murder" of Dr. Aida Rostami for "providing medical care to protesters". They also published an open letter to Chancellor Olaf Scholz, expressing solidarity with Iranian medical professionals and their grave concern "about the human rights and medical situation facing the civilian population of Iran."

Several personnel of the Iran's healthcare system indicated on social media that they would go on strike in protest of Aida Rostam's death.

== See also ==
- Death of Mahsa Amini
- Death of Nika Shakarami
- Deaths during the Mahsa Amini protests
