= Baháʼí 7 =

Seven Bahá'í community leaders arrested in 2008

Yaran
- Predecessor: The National Spiritual Assembly of Iran
- Formation: 1980s
- Type: Baháʼí administration
- Location: Tehran, Iran

The Baháʼí 7, also known as the Yaran ("friends"), were seven Iranian Baháʼí community leaders who were arrested in 2008 and served ten-year prison sentences in Iran. They were Mahvash Sabet, Fariba Kamalabadi, Jamaloddin Khanjani, Afif Naeimi, Saeid Rezaie, Behrouz Tavakkoli and Vahid Tizfahm.

The seven represented an informal national committee that saw to the religious and community affairs of Iran's Baháʼís after the state banned the faith's elected institutions in 1983. A Revolutionary Court in Tehran convicted them in August 2010 on charges including espionage for Israel and propaganda against the state, and sentenced each to 20 years in prison; the terms were later reduced to ten years. The seven never received a written copy of either verdict. The Yaran itself was dissolved in 2009 on the order of Iran's prosecutor general.

The seven were released between September 2017 and December 2018. Sabet, who wrote poetry throughout her imprisonment, was named PEN International's International Writer of Courage in October 2017, weeks after she left prison. In July 2022, during a fresh crackdown on the Baháʼí community, Iranian security forces arrested Sabet, Kamalabadi and Naeimi again; Sabet and Kamalabadi each received a second ten-year sentence in November 2022, which an appeal court upheld the following August.

The case raised international reactions outside of Iran: Amnesty International treated all seven as prisoners of conscience. United Nations human rights experts, the British and German governments and the United States Department of State called for their release, and legislators in the United States and Canada raised the case repeatedly between 2009 and 2025.

== Background ==
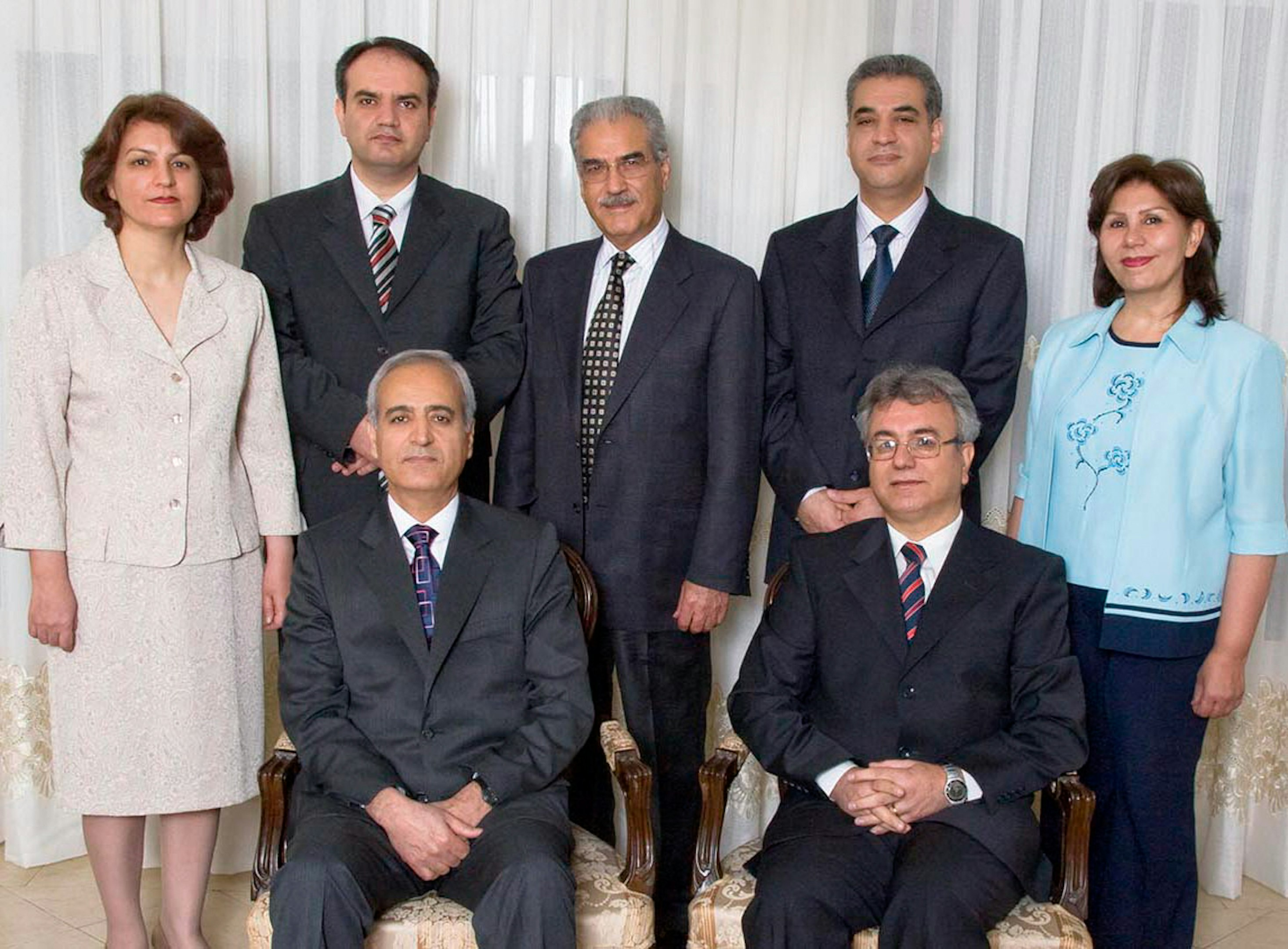
Yaran disappeared in 2008

Because the Baháʼí Faith has no clergy, the adherents will choose a Spiritual Assembly, at a local or national level, to carry out the affairs of the community.

While there had been a history of persecution of Baháʼís in Iran, this was elevated to an official state-sanctioned persecution following the 1979 Iranian Revolution.

In 1980, the nine members of the National Spiritual Assembly were arrested by the Islamic Revolutionary Guard Corps and never heard from again, though the authorities never acknowledged that the group (plus two others with them when they were arrested) had been executed. In 1981, eight of the nine members of the replacement National Spiritual Assembly were arrested and executed; unlike the first Assembly, the Central Revolutionary Courts did acknowledge that the executions of the second Assembly had occurred. In 1983, the Attorney-General of the Revolution announced a ban on all administrative and community activities of the Baháʼí community in Iran. Though the members of the third incarnation of the National Spiritual Assembly disbanded, seven of them were arrested and executed between 1984 and 1987, as acknowledged by the Revolutionary authorities.

Following the 1983 disbandment of the National Spiritual Assembly, a number of Iranian Baháʼís formed an informal group, called the Yaran, to serve the needs of the country's adherents on an ad hoc basis. The group tended to the spiritual and material needs of the Iranian Baháʼí community at a national level and, according to the Baháʼí International Community, operated with the knowledge of the Iranian authorities. Its membership changed over the next 25 years, and was made up of the seven Baháʼí as of March 2008. Tavakkoli, who served on it for 18 years, said that in March 2009 the prosecutor general ruled the Yaran's activities contrary to the national interest, and that the Baháʼí community responded by disbanding the group and its local affiliates.

== Arrests and detention ==
Sabet was detained on 5 March 2008 after being summoned to Mashhad by the Ministry of Intelligence. Officers from the Ministry of Intelligence arrested the other six leaders in raids on their homes on 14 May 2008.

The seven were held in Evin Prison in Section 209, which is run by the Ministry of Intelligence, and were denied access to a lawyer. The five male detainees reportedly were placed in one cell together measuring 10m^{2} and without any beds.

The seven spent about four months in solitary confinement before the first reported family visit, in September 2008. In August 2010, after the verdict, all seven were moved from Evin to Rajaʼi Shahr Prison in Karaj. In February 2011 the International Federation for Human Rights, together with the Iranian League for Human Rights and the Defenders of Human Rights Center, reported that conditions there were deteriorating, that the five men had been placed under harsher conditions after a further transfer, and that the two women had been physically threatened by fellow inmates.

== Charges and trial ==
On 11 February 2009, the Deputy Prosecutor of Tehran said that the case against the "seven defendants in the case of the illegal Bahai group" would be sent in next week to the Revolutionary Court and they would be charged with "espionage for Israel, insulting religious sanctities and propaganda against the system." In response, Amnesty International stated that it "considers the charges to be politically motivated and those held to be prisoners of conscience, detained solely because of their conscientiously held beliefs or their peaceful activities on behalf of the Baha'i community. If convicted, they would face lengthy prison terms, or even the death penalty."

In May 2009, the families of the detainees were told that the seven were now facing the additional charge of mofsed-e-filarz (spreading corruption on earth), which can carry the death penalty. The families were also informed that their detained relatives were scheduled to appear on 11 July 2009 before Branch 28 of the Revolutionary Court in Tehran to face the charges. The scheduled 11 July appearance was delayed and no new trial was given.

The first session of the trial was held on January 12, 2010, before the Revolutionary Court in Tehran. Government authorities reportedly attempted to bar the Baháʼís' lawyers from the courtroom, but were permitted access after insisting upon entering. Sessions were also held on February 7 and 12 April 2010. At the latter session, the seven Baháʼí and their lawyers reportedly "refused to participate in the proceedings when they saw Ministry of Intelligence interrogators and a film crew at what was supposed to be a closed hearing."

The case was heard by Judge Mohammad Moghisseh in Branch 28 of the Revolutionary Court. The defence team was led by the Nobel Peace Prize laureate Shirin Ebadi, who said she and her colleagues were given the case file only after the 18-month investigation had closed and were allowed a single meeting with their clients in prison beforehand. Ebadi described the charges as baseless and politically motivated, and said the proceedings did not follow Iran's own laws. In March 2009 the U.S. Senate recorded that Ebadi had been denied all access to the prisoners and their files.

On 7 August 2010, the Revolutionary Court in Tehran convicted the seven Baháʼí of crimes including "espionage for Israel", "insulting religious sanctities" and "propaganda against the system," and sentenced them to 20 years imprisonment. In response, Amnesty International called for their immediate release, describing the verdict as "a sad and damning manifestation of the deeply-rooted discrimination against Baha'is by the Iranian authorities."

In September 2010 the seven were told that an appeal court had acquitted them of some of the charges, including espionage, and that their sentences had been reduced to ten years; they were never given a written copy of either verdict. In March 2011, judge Mohammad Movahedi Azad (later Prosecutor-General) reinstated the 20-year sentences. Each ultimately served ten years, under Article 134 of the Islamic Penal Code, which allows a prisoner convicted on several counts to serve only the longest of the sentences.

== Completion of prison terms ==
On September 18, 2017, Mahvash Sabet was released from prison. Two days later Senator John McCain commented on being unified with the Baháʼís on her release and condemning her imprisonment. During her imprisonment, Sabet wrote many poetry books that were smuggled out and published. She is an acclaimed writer and a poet.

On October 31, 2017, Fariba Kamalabadi was released "after completing a 10-year prison sentence. Her release follows that of Mahvash Sabet, a teacher, poet and also a former member of the group, the Yaran (or friends) ... Five other members of the group remain in jail...".

Behrouz Tavakkoli was released in early December 2017, and told the Center for Human Rights in Iran that he had been refused furlough for the whole of his ten years. On 19 March 2018, Vahid Tizfahm, an optician from Tabriz and at 44 the youngest of the seven, became the sixth to be released.

On March 17, 2018, then 85-year-old Jamaloddin Khanjani was released, "...the oldest of the seven, is the fifth to be released since September 2017...".

On 20 December 2018, Afif Naeimi became the last of the seven to be released. The Baháʼí International Community said Naeimi, then 56, had serious health problems and often received inadequate treatment in custody, and that the authorities did not count the time he spent on hospital furlough towards his sentence, which extended his detention by months and made him the last of the group to go free.

== Sabet's prison writing ==
Sabet wrote poetry throughout her first imprisonment, scribbling on paper napkins and towels and passing them to her family during contact visits. A collection was translated by the novelist Bahiyyih Nakhjavani and published in English in 2013 as Prison Poems.

PEN International marked Sabet's work on its Day of the Imprisoned Writer in November 2014, and her verses were reproduced on a New York mural painted by the Chilean street artist El Cekis. In October 2017, three weeks after her release, she was named International Writer of Courage, an award she shared with the poet Michael Longley, that year's PEN Pinter Prize winner; Nakhjavani accepted it on her behalf in London. At the ceremony Longley called her imprisonment "a sin against the light".

== Second arrests and imprisonment ==
In July 2022, Iranian security forces began a new round of raids and arrests against the Baháʼí community. Three former members of the Yaran were among those detained: Mahvash Sabet (arrested on 31 July after a raid on her home), Fariba Kamalabadi and Afif Naimi. All three were charged with "managing the unlawful [Baháʼí] administration", which carries up to ten years in prison. In August 2022 Iran's Ministry of Intelligence said it had arrested Baháʼís suspected of spying for a Baháʼí centre in Israel and of unlawfully promoting their religion.

Sabet and Kamalabadi were tried on 21 November 2022 before Judge Iman Afshari in Branch 26 of the Tehran Revolutionary Court. The hearing lasted about an hour, and each was sentenced to ten years in prison; Sabet was convicted of founding or leading an organisation aimed at disrupting national security, under Article 498 of the Islamic Penal Code. IranWire reported that the judge spent most of the hearing rebuking the defendants for having run the Baháʼí community in Iran, and RFE/RL reported that he faulted the two women for not having learned from their earlier imprisonment.

The Tehran Court of Appeal upheld both sentences in August 2023. The two were also ordered to hand over their phones and laptops, and were barred for two years from living in Tehran, leaving the country and taking part in social or political organisations. Sabet's health deteriorated in custody: USCIRF recorded a severe respiratory and lung condition in October 2024 for which it said she was not given appropriate treatment, and a transfer to a Tehran hospital in December 2024 for worsening cardiac problems. She was sent home on medical furlough after open-heart surgery and remained liable to be returned to prison as of April 2025.

Khanjani was detained a second time on 13 August 2023, when security forces took him and his daughter Maria Khanjani to Evin Prison. The grounds were not disclosed. He was released on bail on 2 September 2023.

== International response ==
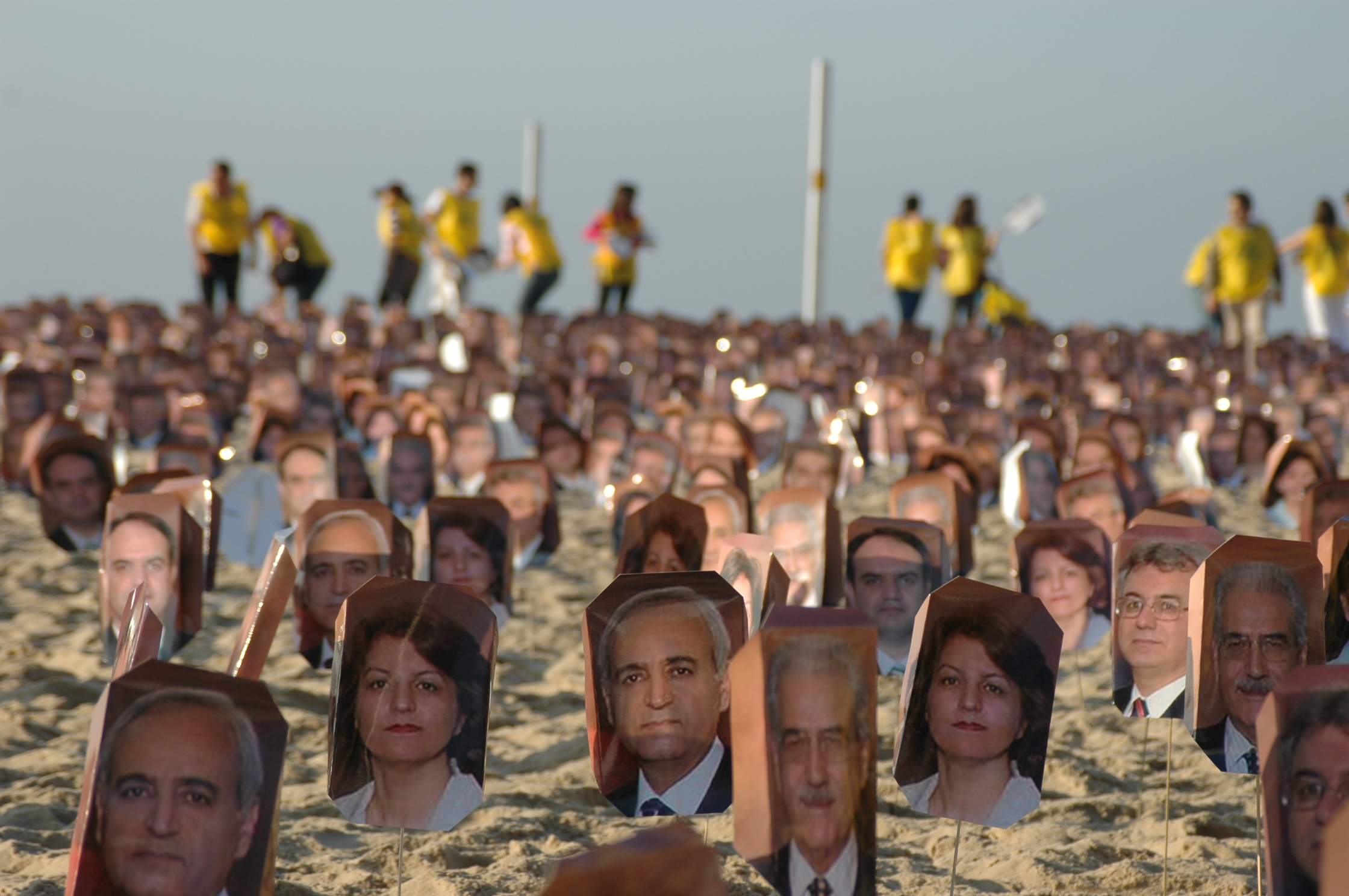
Images of the Baháʼí 7 at a rally in Rio de Janeiro, Brazil

The day after the 20-year sentences were handed down in August 2010, the German government's human rights commissioner, Markus Löning, called them a severe setback and asked Iran to quash the verdicts and hold a fair retrial. British Foreign Secretary William Hague said two days later that the Iranian judiciary had failed to follow even its own procedures, that the accused had been denied access to lawyers, and that the case was "a shocking example of the Iranian state's continued discrimination against the Baha'is". In May 2013 a group of United Nations human rights experts called on Iran to release the seven immediately. The U.S. State Department did the same in May 2017, on the ninth anniversary of the arrests.

Legislators in several countries took up the case. The U.S. Senate considered resolutions condemning Iran's treatment of its Baháʼí minority and naming the seven in 2009 and again in 2013, and members of the Tom Lantos Human Rights Commission each adopted an individual prisoner through its Defending Freedoms Project. In the Canadian House of Commons, James Bezan marked the eighth year of the imprisonment in May 2015, calling the 20-year term the longest then imposed on any prisoner of conscience in Iran, and Marwan Tabbara made a similar statement a year later. In December 2025, a resolution introduced in the U.S. House of Representatives named Sabet and Kamalabadi as former Yaran members serving a second ten-year term.

Kamalabadi's case drew attention inside Iran in May 2016, when she was visited during a short furlough by her former cellmate Faezeh Hashemi Rafsanjani, a daughter of former president Akbar Hashemi Rafsanjani, and by the human rights lawyer Nasrin Sotoudeh. Photographs of the visit circulated widely on social media and on Iranian satellite television.

== See also ==
- Persecution of Baháʼís
- National Spiritual Assembly of the Baháʼís of Iran
