= Soheila Hejab =

Iranian human rights activist

- سهیلا حجاب
- Born: 1990
- Occupations: lawyer political and civil rights activist
- Known for: Civil rights advocacy

Soheila Hejab Bidsorkhi (Persian: سهیلا حجاب, romanized: Soheila Hijab; born 1990) is an Iranian lawyer, political activist, and civil rights activist.

== Background and education ==
Hejab is an ethnic Kurd with origins in Kermanshah. She obtained a law degree and qualified as a human rights lawyer. Hejab is known to have supported monarchism and the exiled Crown Prince Reza Pahlavi.

== Arrests ==
Hejab has been repeatedly arrested for her political and women's rights activism.

== Before 2019 ==
Hejab was first arrested in January 2018 in Shiraz on charges of "assembly, collusion and propaganda against the system". Another arrest followed in December 2018, when she was sentenced to two years in prison, of which she served five months.

== 2019 arrest and allegations of mistreatment ==
Hejab was rearrested by the Islamic Revolutionary Guard Corps (IRGC) in June 2019 and eventually brought to Evin Prison. In an open letter from 13 January 2020, she denounced the suppression of protests in November 2019 and called for the overthrow of what she called the "tyrannical regime". In March 2020, days after her temporary release on heavy bail, Hejab was sentenced to 18 years in prison after having been convicted for charges including "propaganda against the system", "forming a women's rights group" and "calling for a referendum to change the Constitution". According to Iranian law, she has to serve 7.5 years of the sentence. After an appeals court session on 23 May 2020, she was arrested and beaten by IRGC officials and brought to Qarchak Prison. From within prison, she continued to call for the toppling of Supreme Leader of Iran, Ali Khamenei. In November 2021 it was reported that Hejab had been moved to a prison in Sanandaj.

In February 2022 it was reported that Hejab had contracted COVID-19, along with 13 other prisoners in the women's ward. A missive from March 2022 by the Center for Human Rights in Iran to Human Rights Commissioner Michelle Bachelet named Hejab as one of five Iranian activists who were currently sick but denied medical leave. Hejab was reportedly released on medical grounds in March 2023.
