= Qarchak Prison =

Prison in Iran

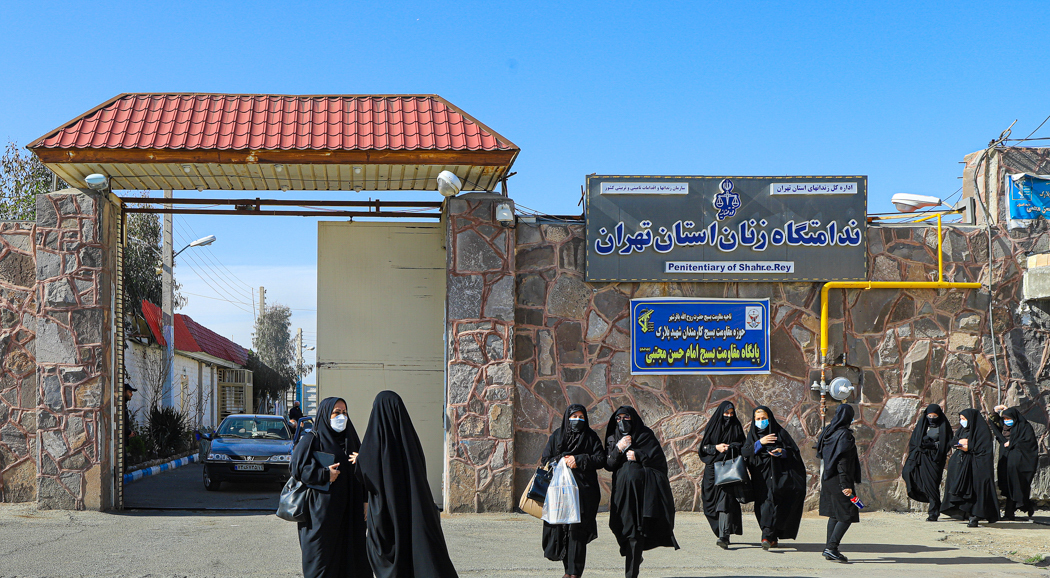
- Qarchak Prison (2021)
- Interactive map of Qarchak Prison
- Location: Varamin; 35.468°N 51.557°E
- Status: Operational
- Opened: 2010; 16 years ago
- Managed by: Judicial system of Iran; IRGC
- Warden: Soughra Khodadadi

Notable prisoners
- Yasaman Aryani; Atena Daemi (Jan 2018-May 2018:returned to Evin); Marjan Davari; Atena Farghadani (2015-16); Ghoncheh Ghavami (2014); Bahareh Hedayat (Feb 2020); Soheila Hejab; Golrokh Ebrahimi Iraee (Jan 2018-May 2018: returned to Evin) (Nov 2019-Dec 2020: returned to Evin); Noushin Jafari (16 Feb 2021- ) Zeynab Jalalian (April 2020-June 2020: transferred to Kerman Prison); Saba Kord Afshari (Aug 2018-Oct 2018: transferred to Evin) (June 2019-Aug 2019: transferred to Evin) (Dec 2020-); Leila (Khadijeh) Mirghafari (Apr 2020); Kylie Moore-Gilbert (July 2020-Oct 2020:transferred to Evin); Sepideh Qolian; Shaparak Shajarizadeh (Feb 2018-Apr 2018); Nasrin Sotoudeh (Oct 2020-); Shokoufeh Yadollahi (Feb 2018-Jul 2019:Transferred to Evin)

Qarchak Prison (Persian: زندان قرچک, romanized: Zendân-e-Qarchak) is a prison for women located in Qarchak, in Qarchak County, previously part of Varamin County, Tehran province, Iran (30 km SSE of the capital). It is also called Persian: زندان زنان ری, romanized: Rey Women Prison (Shahr-e Rey prison), "Gharchak Women’s Prison", Rey Penitentiary or Varamin prison.

== Health and sanitation conditions ==
Health conditions are very poor inside Qarchak. There is no proper sewer. According to the NCRI Women's Committee, the prison infirmary was ill-equipped to deal with outbreaks of coronavirus and did not have masks or sanitary supplies for inmates.

In August 2025, reports from human rights organizations described a severe deterioration in conditions at Qarchak Prison, citing prolonged power outages during extreme summer heat, lack of access to potable water, and denial of adequate medical care for inmates with chronic illnesses. Political prisoner Maryam Akbari Monfared was reported to be in immediate danger due to the lack of urgent medical attention.

== Prisoners ==
The prison's seven sections contain more than 1400 prisoners, which is twice the nominal capacity.

As of July 2020, 17 female political prisoners are being detained in Qarchak prison.

On 23 May 2020, Soheila Hejab (Persian: سهیلا حجاب, romanized: Soheila Hijab), a 30-year-old law graduate sentenced to 18 years in prison for forming a group for women's rights and who had been summoned for that day to the Court of Appeals, was brutally arrested on leaving the hearing by IRGC agents, and taken to Qarchak.

In June 2020, it was reported that political prisoners in Qarchak had been infected with COVID-19.

On 26 July 2020, the Australian academic Kylie Moore-Gilbert was moved from Evin to Qarchak. Moore-Gilbert was later returned to Evin and freed in November 2020.

On 20 October 2020, human rights activist and lawyer Nasrin Sotoudeh was moved to Qarchak from Evin prison.

In July 2025, trade unionist Nasrin Javadi and other political prisoners were moved to Qarchack following the Israeli strikes on Evin prison.

== Reactions ==
Qarchak prison is listed under Section 106 of the US's Countering America's Adversaries Through Sanctions Act (CAATSA) on the basis of extrajudicial killings, torture and other violations of human rights.

On 7 December 2021, the U.S. Department of the Treasury added Soghra Khodadadi (described as "the current director of Qarchak") to its Specially Designated Nationals (SDN) list. Individuals on the list have their assets blocked and U.S. persons are generally prohibited from dealing with them. The listing said Khodadadi "was responsible for ordering and directly participating in a violent attack on 13 December 2020 against prisoners of conscience in Ward 8 along with at least 20 other guards. According to publicly available reports, prison guards beat these female prisoners of conscience with batons and stun guns. Khodadadi ordered this attack in retaliation for the prisoners exercising their right to freedom of expression."

== See also ==
- Human rights in Iran
- Judicial system of Iran #Prison system
