= Taraneh Mousavi =

Iranian activist (1981–2009)

- ترانه موسوی
- Born: 1981; Tehran, Iran
- Died: 2009 (aged 28)
- Cause of death: Tortured, raped, burned, and killed by the Iranian Police and Basij
- Occupation: Iranian protester

Taraneh Mousavi (Persian: ترانه موسوی; 1981–2009) was a young Iranian woman who reportedly died after being sexually abused while in custody after being arrested for protesting the 2009 election results.

Most information about her comes from Iranian blogs and Internet sites and has not been verified. But Morteza Alviri, representative to a committee tasked with investigating post-election crimes, confirmed the affair of Taraneh Mousavi. Mousavi was reportedly arrested at a protest rally close to the Ghoba mosque in Tehran on June 28, 2009. Reports are unclear as to whether she was participating in the rally. Some weeks later, according to one Iranian blog, her mother received an anonymous call from a government source informing her that her daughter had been hospitalized for "rupturing of her womb and anus in ... an unfortunate accident". She could be found at Imam Khomeini Hospital in the city of Karaj, just north of Tehran. Another site reportedly stated that Mousavi "was mentally and physically abused" in Evin prison. The site reported self-described witnesses as saying nothing about her death but that a person matching "her physical description and injuries" had been treated at the Imam Khomeini Hospital, but was unconscious both when witnessed and when later "transferred out of the hospital." On July 17 one of the blogs reported that, the day before her family was informed, "a burned corpse matching Taraneh's description had been found in the desert between Karaj and Qazvin," and that they should keep quiet about the incident. In the US, a Republican Senator publicized the incident in a speech on the Senate floor. The US congressman urged Iran's Supreme Leader to look at the pictures of Taraneh, condemning the Iranian leader and his regime, where he described them as murderous and misogynistic, according to the observers, France 24.

== In Roger Waters: The Wall ==
Her picture was shown among many other people in Roger Waters The Wall in the ending credits.

== Controversy ==
Doubts have been raised as to the veracity of the story. Mehdi Jami of Newsbann first raised questions about the absence of any evidence of the story being true. This was then picked up on by QLineOrientalist, who argued that the story as presented by a clique of three bloggers with a "high degree of coordination between them" and was riddled by unresolvable internal contradictions. For example, the burned body was supposedly identified by a security official, but it is unclear how a burned body would have been identified as belonging to Taraneh Muslavi by people who, presumably, were not looking for her.

The Islamic Republic released a video purporting to identify the real Taraneh Musavi. In this video, they claimed there were only three people in Iran with the name "Taraneh Mousavi" in Iran; however, opposition groups produced a list of other Taraneh Mousavis in Iran including a musician in a music band called "Orchide".

== See also ==
- Political repression in the Islamic Republic of Iran
