= Cheragh Veys =

Cheragh Veys چراغ‌ویس
- Village
- Location within Iran
- Coordinates: 36°10′08″N 46°05′39″E
- Country: Iran
- Province: Kurdistan
- County: Saqqez
- Bakhsh: Central
- Rural District: Mir Deh

Population (2006)
  - Total: 174
- Time zone: UTC+3:30 (IRST)
  - Summer (DST): UTC+4:30 (IRDT)

Cheragh Veys (Persian: چراغ‌ویس, also Romanized as Cherāgh Veys) is a village in Mir Deh Rural District, in the Central District of Saqqez County, Kurdistan Province, Iran. At the 2006 census, its population was 174, in 31 families. The village is populated by Kurds.
