= Arash Sadeghi =

Iranian activist and political prisoner

- Persian: آرش صادقی
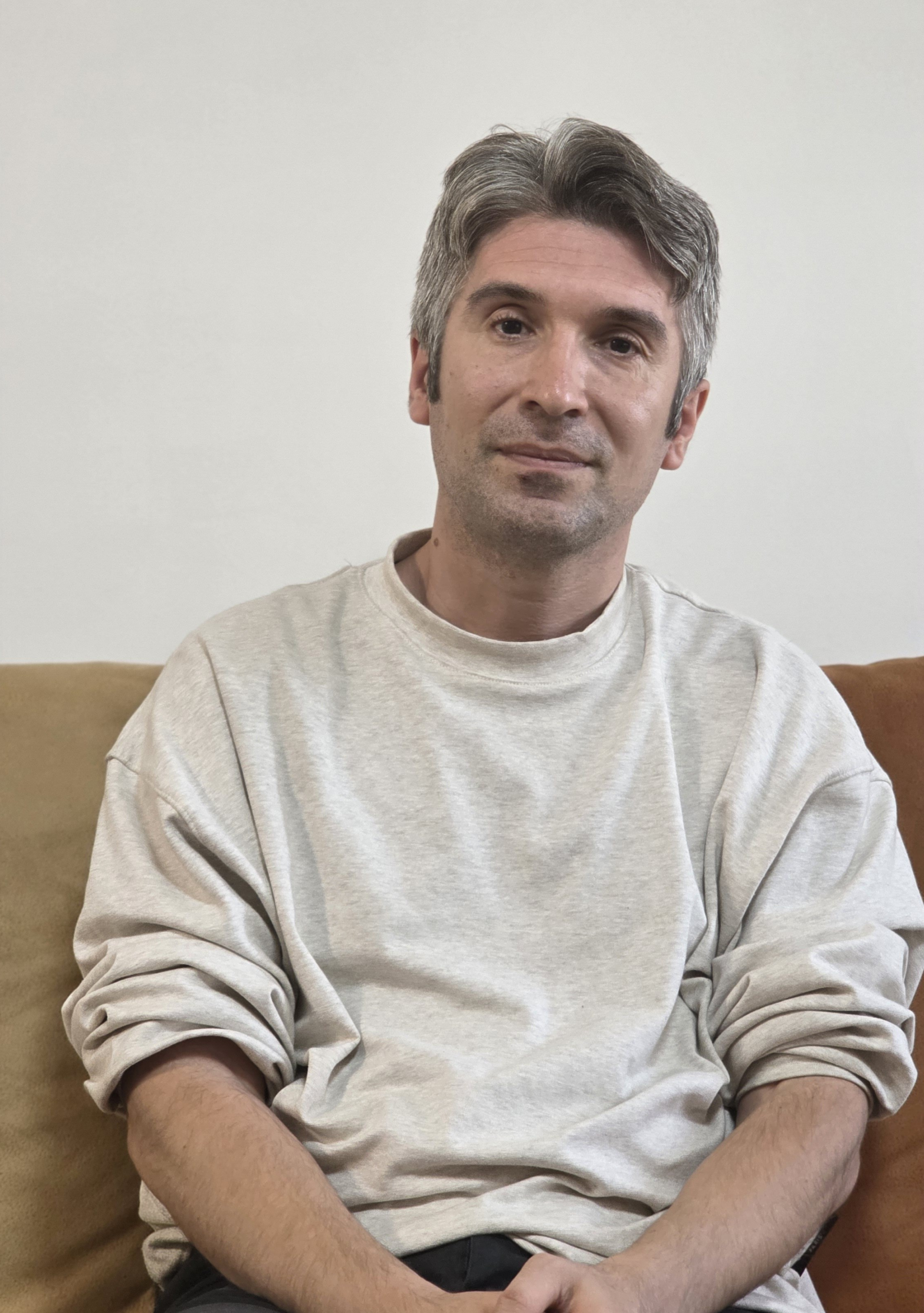
- Arash Sadeghi
- Born: September 29, 1986 (age 39)
- Known for: Human rights activism
- Spouse: Golrokh Ebrahimi Iraee

Arash Sadeghi (Persian: آرش صادقی, born September 29, 1986) is an Iranian activist and a political prisoner known best for his hunger strike as an act of protest against the detention of his wife without any judiciary proof or legal warrant. Sadeghi was a university student in Allameh Tabatabaei University in Tehran where he was expelled by the authorities due to his political activities.

Sadeghi ended his hunger strike after 71 days after his wife was granted temporary release from prison. He was released from prison on May 1, 2021. Sadeghi was arrested again on October 12, 2022 during the Mahsa Amini protests.

== Activism ==
He was first arrested on July 9, 2009 after the results of the controversial 2009 Presidential Election were announced due to which Mahmoud Ahmadinejad would be kept in power for a second term. He was then taken to custody from which he was released after 90 days. He was arrested again for a second time in December of the same year.

In 2013 he was sentenced to 19 years in prison for the following charges: propaganda against the government, defamation of the supreme leader, and threatening national security.

Sadeghi went on a hunger strike on October 24, 2016 to protest against the arrest of his wife who was detained on the charge of writing a fiction which has not yet been published. The short story was handwritten in her personal diary which was confiscated in a raid by government security agents. Her short personal story in her journal was about Stoning Women to death which has been carried out by the Iranian judiciary.

As of 2016 there were multiple campaigns raising awareness about his condition.

== Mother's death during security forces' raid ==
During an earlier raid by Iranian security forces in 2010 when he was not home, his mother suffered a heart attack and died a few days later in hospital as a result of the heart attack. The security agents kept ransacking the house while she laid on the floor due to the heart attack.

== Cancer affliction and denied treatment ==
Arash Sadeghi has been diagnosed with a bone tumor. Amnesty criticized the Iranian authorities for “disregarding medical advice which recommends his immediate transfer to a facility specializing in cancer treatment.”

Sadeghi was reported to have suffered pain in his shoulder for several months, with the prison clinic in Raja’i Shahr, Karaj, prescribing anti-inflammatory drugs. Finally he received an X-ray in May 2018 and later an MRI.

On May 10, 2021, it was reported that Sadeghi had been released from prison on May 1, 2021, pursuant to a May 2020 law that reduced prison sentences for political prisoners.

== Hunger strike ==
Sadeghi has been on several hunger strikes. His kidney and stomach ailments were attributed to the hunger strikes.

== Twitter Campaign ==
On the 68th day of his strike, Iranian Twitter users started a widespread campaign to raise awareness about Arash Sadeghi's critical condition; consequently, the hashtag #SaveArash became the number 1 trending hashtag on Twitter.

== 2022 arrest ==
During the Mahsa Amini protests Sadeghi was arrested again on October 12, 2022. His father, Hossein Sadeghi, broke out the news on his Twitter account by writing only one sentence: "Arash Sadeghi was arrested." In a call to his family, Sadeghi said that he was transferred to ward 209 of Evin Prison which is run by the government's Ministry of Intelligence.

== See also ==
- Human rights in Iran
- Detainees of the Mahsa Amini protests
