= Yasaman Aryani =

Iranian human rights activist

Yasaman Aryani is an Iranian political prisoner. She appeared without a head scarf, and talked about it on social media.

== Biography ==
In August 2018, Aryani was arrested at a protest in Tehran with other activists, while assisting an old woman the police knocked to the ground. Charged with "disrupting public order", Aryani was sentenced to a year in Evin Prison. According to the U.S., Evin Prison has committed "serious human rights abuses" against political dissidents and critics of the government.

When released in February 2019, Aryani denounced her early release as "a show" with the Iranian government trying to promote a positive image with the international community.

External videos
- Yasaman Aryani without her head scarf – YouTube

On 8 March 2019, she and her mother boarded a women-only train on the Tehran Metro, and neither of them wore headscarves. In April 2019, Aryani and her mother were arrested in relation to the video (right) taken of them on a train without headscarves. In the video, Aryani spoke of her hopes for a future when women would be free to choose what they wear, "me without the hijab and you with the hijab". After a version of the video went viral, Aryani was arrested and charged with "inciting and facilitating corruption and prostitution" through promoting "unveiling". The 1979 Islamic Revolution, Iranian authorities enforce a strict dress code which includes women veiling themselves. Aryani and her mother were each sentenced to 16 years in prison.

On 29 July 2019, together with three other female political prisoners in Qarchak prison, Aryani was brutally attacked by regular inmates, who were incited by prison officials. (Prisoners of conscience, i.e. political prisoners, in Qarchak prison are repeatedly attacked by common law, i.e. criminal, prisoners, who are incited by prison officials.) According to the Nobel Women's Initiative, Aryani has faced "nightmarish conditions in prison... she’s been held in solitary confinement, denied calls from family, and threatened with the arrest of other family members if she did not recant on camera and express 'regret' for allowing herself to be influenced by 'foreign agents'." Amnesty International is campaigning for her release.After serving almost four years, Aryani and her mother were released.
