= Atena Daemi =

Iranian civil rights activist

Atena Daemi Khoshknoudehani
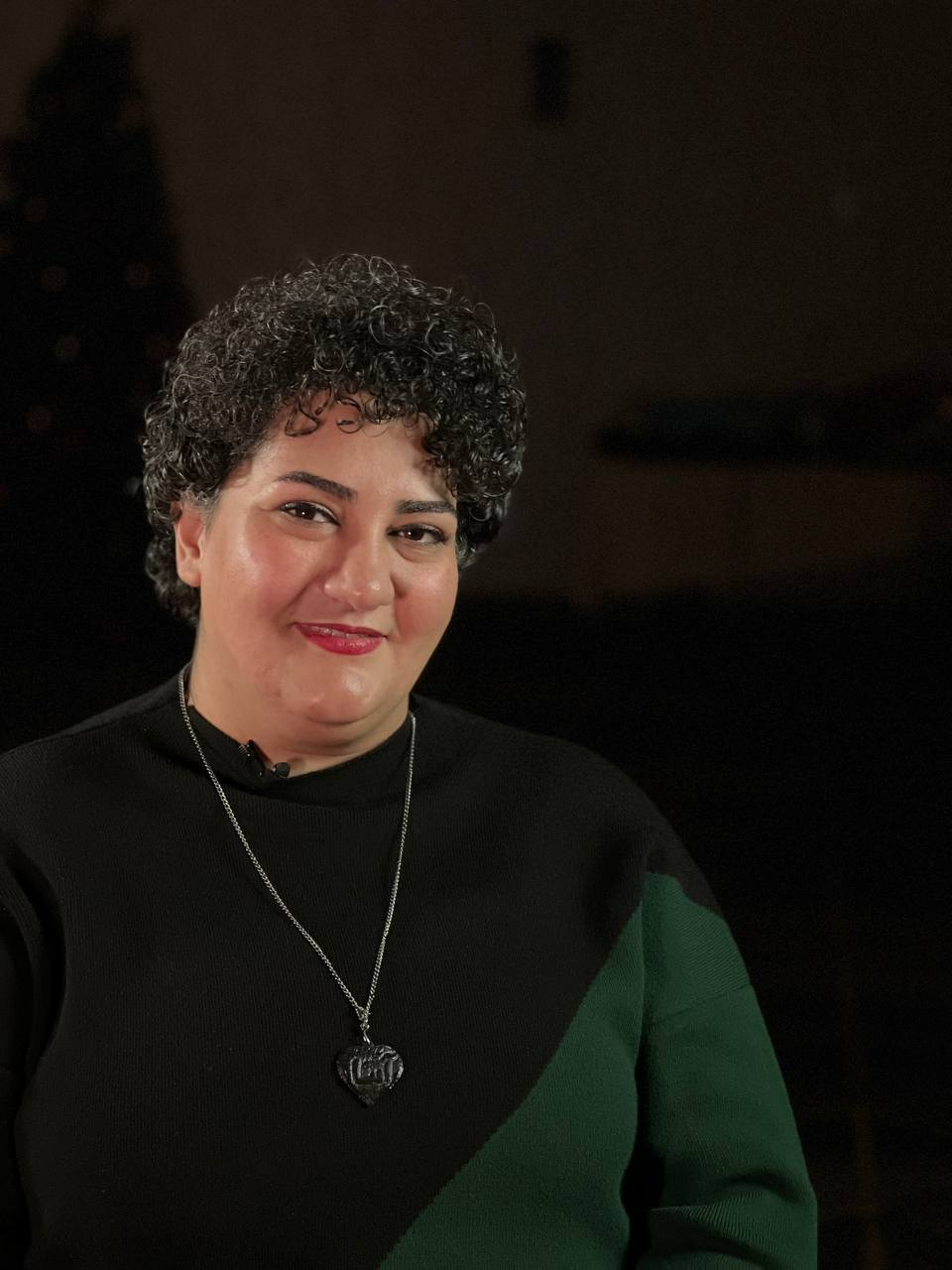
- Born: Fatemeh; 26 March 1988 (age 38); Tehran, Iran
- Known for: Human Rights Defender

Atena Daemi Khoshknudhani (Persian: آتنا دائمی; born 1988) is an Iranian civil rights activist, children's rights activist, human rights activist and political prisoner in Iran. Daemi was last arrested in November 2016 and sentenced seven years prison sentence. Peaceful activities for which she was charged include distributing anti-death penalty leaflets and making posts on Facebook and Twitter criticising Iran's execution record. Later, Daemi and her sisters were arrested and sentenced on charges of having "insulted officers on duty". Subsequent appeals have overturned that conviction and reduced Daemi's original sentence.

Daemi has been on hunger strike at Evin Prison (9 April 2017 – 1 June 2017, 55 days) and at Shahr-e Rey prison near Tehran (24 January 2018 – 15 February 2018, 22 days). She continues to protest against conditions and against the death penalty from within Evin prison. She is considered a prisoner of conscience by Amnesty International.

== Activities ==
Daemi worked at the prestigious Revolution Sports Club in Tehran. She participated in protests appealing for an end to capital punishment, and attended rallies on behalf of children in Syria.

== Arrest ==
Atena Daemi was arrested on 21 October 2014; she was kept in solitary confinement, denied access to a lawyer, and repeatedly interrogated for 86 days. On 14 January 2015 she was transferred to the women's wing of Evin prison. She was accused of "gathering and colluding against national security", "spreading propaganda against the system", "concealing evidence" and "insulting the founder of the Islamic Republic of Iran and the Supreme Leader".

== Sentence ==
Daemi was sentenced on 21 May 2015 by Judge Moghiseh of Revolutionary Court Branch 28, after a fifteen-minute trial. She received a sentence totaling fourteen years in prison, on several counts. The longest sentence was seven years for "assembly and collusion". Her sentence relates to peaceful activism, including charges related to distributing anti-death penalty leaflets and posts on Facebook and Twitter criticising Iran's execution record. Her arrest and sentencing are seen as part of a wave of vague charges and harsh sentences being used against activists, authors, and artists by Iran's judiciary.

Daemi's case was appealed to Branch 36 of the Appeals Court. As of 13 January 2016 the appeal had not been processed and concerns about her health had not been addressed. Daemi was released on bail, after a payment of 5500 million rials, on 15 February 2016. An appeals court hearing was held in July 2016. The appeal was based on Article 134 of the New Islamic Penal Code, under which her sentence was reduced to the maximum length of the most serious charge, seven years.

Daemi was re-arrested at her parents home, in front of her sisters, on 26 November 2016 and returned to Evin Prison. She formally complained to the Office of the Prosecutor in Evin prison about the actions of the Revolutionary Guards who arrested her.

On 23 March 2017, Daemi and her sisters were charged and convicted with "insulting public officers on duty". After a one-hour criminal court trial, they were sentenced to three months and one day. This term of imprisonment was added to Daemi's sentence, but suspended for her sisters.

In April 2017, Daemi began a hunger strike to protest the additional charges. At a second appeals court hearing, she and her sisters were acquitted of the 2017 charges. Daemi ended her hunger strike on 1 June 2017, after 55 days.

In January 2022, Amnesty International announced that Daemi had been released, following five years of imprisonment.

== Detention ==
=== Evin Prison ===
Daemi started a hunger strike on 9 April 2017, which lasted until 1 June, a strike of 55 days, to protest the addition of three months and one day to her seven-year sentence. It was also in protest of the sentencing of her sisters after the Islamic Revolutionary Guards Corps (IRGC) complained that the sisters had "insulted officers on duty."

A letter was written by Amnesty International on 17 May 2017, asking for Daemi to be transferred from prison to a hospital, and describing what had happened to her in prison. The letter said that Daemi, who had then been on hunger strike for 40 days, had been coughing up blood, and had suffered severe weight loss, nausea, vomiting, blood pressure fluctuations, and kidney pain. Doctors warned that she required immediate hospitalization. However, the authorities at Evin Prison refused to authorize her transfer to a hospital outside prison for medical treatment. Her hunger strike ended on 1 June 2017, after an appeals court struck down the additional charges against her and her sisters.

=== Qarchak Prison ===
On 24 January 2018, Daemi was transferred to Qarchak prison. She was moved along with Golrokh Ebrahimi Iraee, who had been imprisoned for writing an unpublished fictional story that criticized the practice of stoning women to death. Their transfer to Shahr-e Rey, a prison for violent offenders, was challenged as illegal, because it violates Iranian regulations about the classification of prisoners.

Both women began a hunger strike on 3 February 2018 following their transfer. Amnesty international again appealed for their immediate and unconditional release on the grounds that they have been imprisoned for the peaceful exercise of their human rights. Amnesty has repeatedly expressed concern over unsanitary and dangerous conditions at the prison, which was previously an industrial chicken farm, as well as concerns about ill-treatment of Daemi and Iraee.

Atena Daemi remained on hunger strike until 15 February 2018, 22 days. Golrokh Ebrahimi Iraee continued her hunger strike until 24 April 2018, lasting 81 days. Both women were in extremely serious physical condition, and were the subject of international appeals. They were returned to Evin Prison's Women's on May 10, 2018.

=== Rasht Prison ===
On 16 March 2021, just days before Nowrouz, Atena was "prison exiled" to Rasht Central Prison, where it would be harder for her family to visit her.

== Subsequent protests ==
On 25 May 2018, Daemi sent a letter out of Evin Prison, condemning the death penalty and discussing the situation of death-row political prisoner Ramin Hossein-Panahi.

On 10 October 2018, World Day Against the Death Penalty, Daemi, Golrokh Ebrahimi Iraee, and Maryam Akbari Monfared signed a letter publicly appealing to Javaid Rehman, as a United Nations Special Rapporteur, to assess possible human rights violations in Iran, including the use of the death penalty.

In October 2018, commemorating the fourth year of her imprisonment, Daemi wrote a public letter to her mother.
