= List of people from Tehran =

The following notable people were born in, residents of, or otherwise closely associated with the city of Tehran, Iran. Tehran natives are also referred to as Tehranis.

== Born in Tehran ==
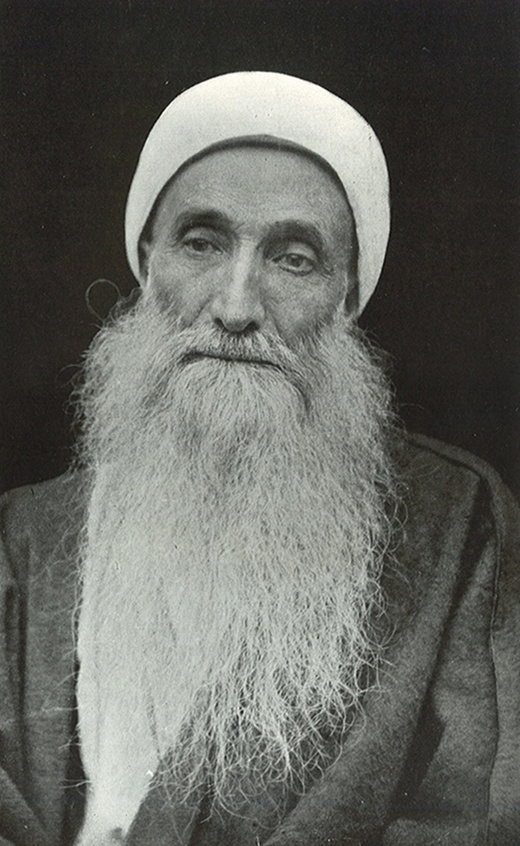
Subh-i-Azal (1831–1912)

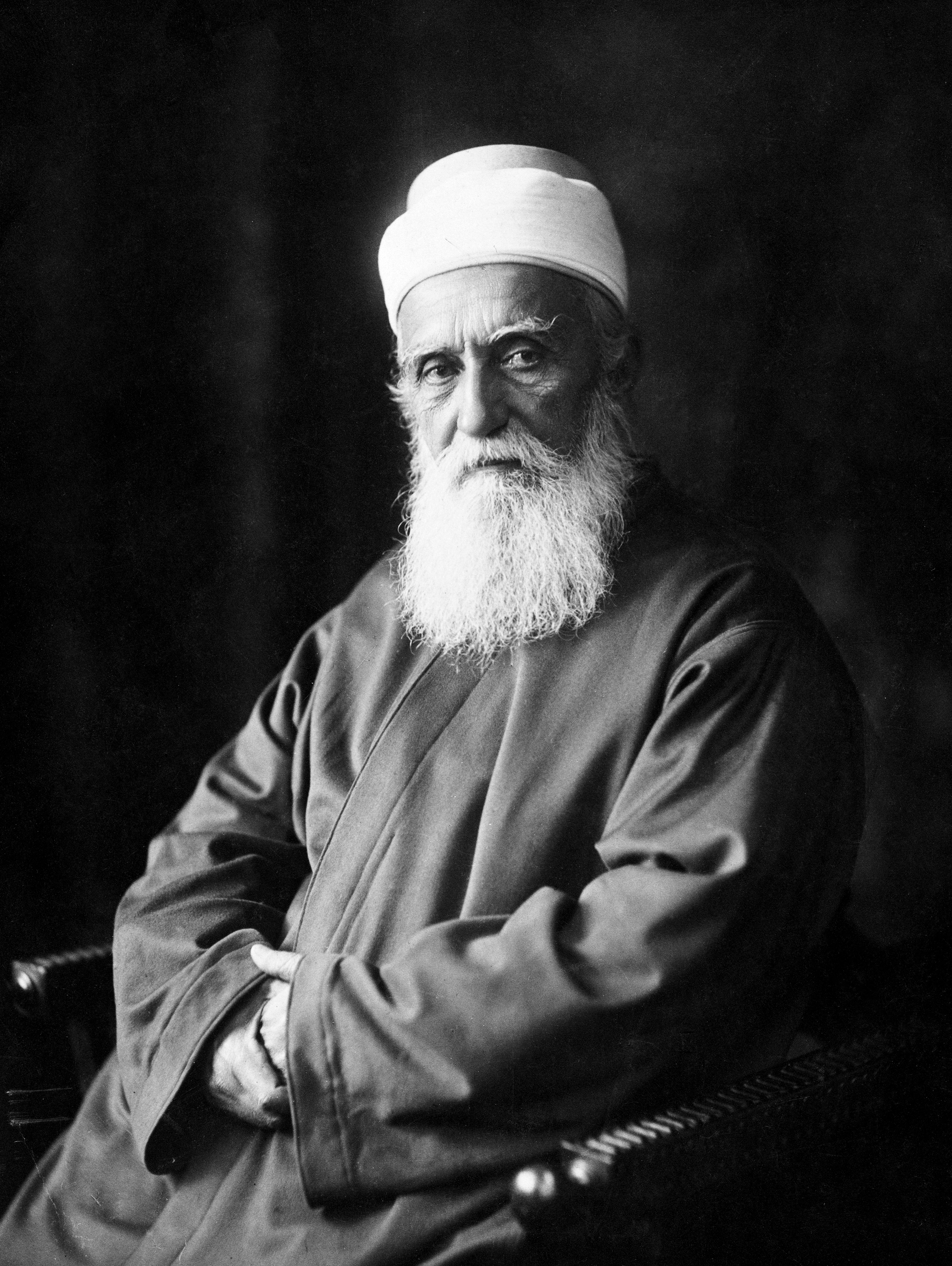
ʻAbdu'l-Bahá (1844–1921)

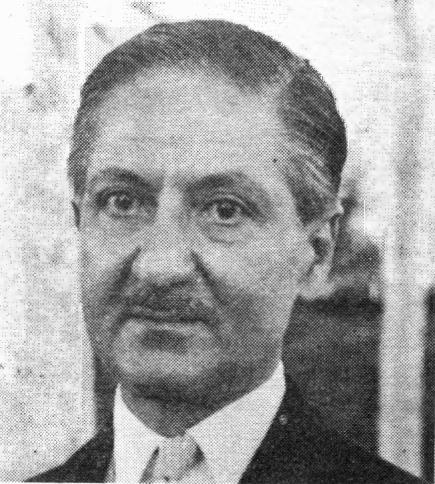
Nasrollah Entezam (1900–1980)

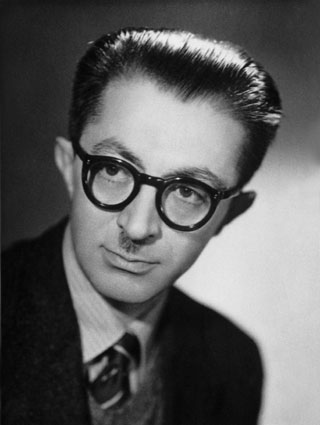
Sadegh Hedayat (1903–1951)

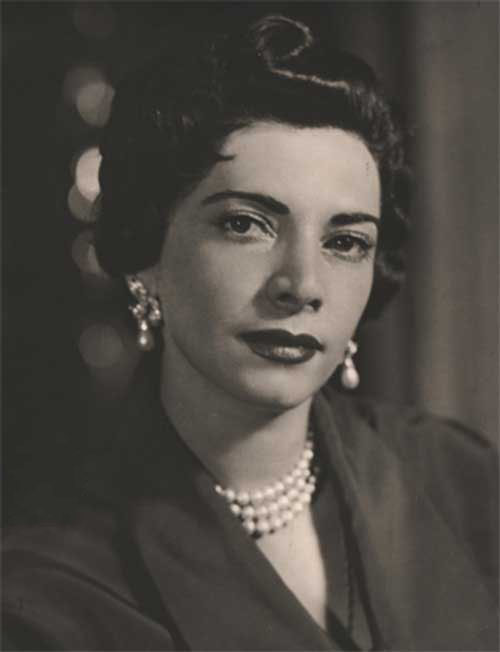
Shams Pahlavi (1917–1906)

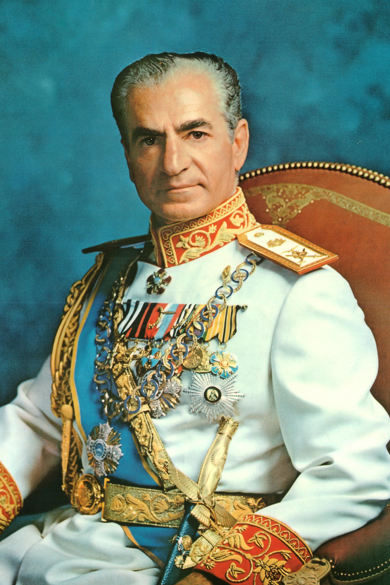
Mohammad Reza Pahlavi (1919–1980)

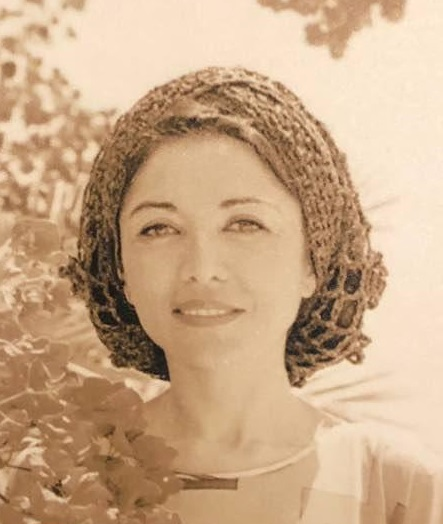
Fatemeh Pahlavi (1928–1987)

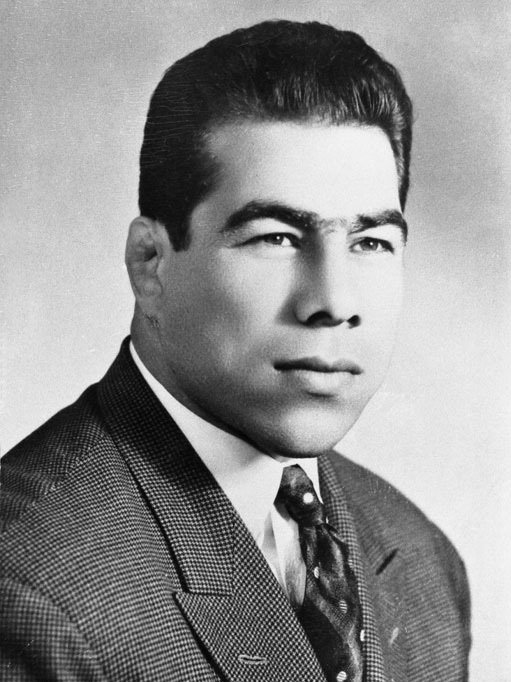
Gholamreza Takhti (1930–1968)

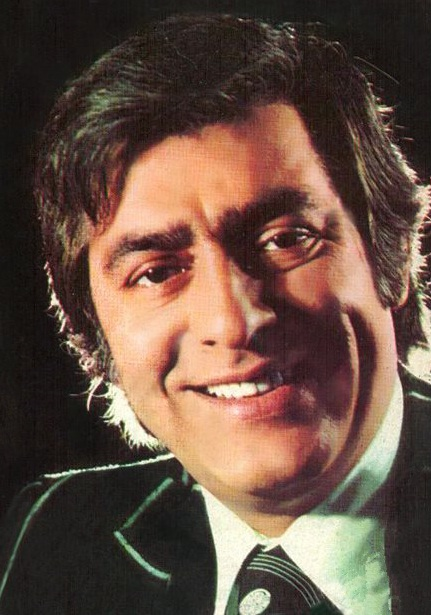
Mohammad Ali Fardin (1931–2000)

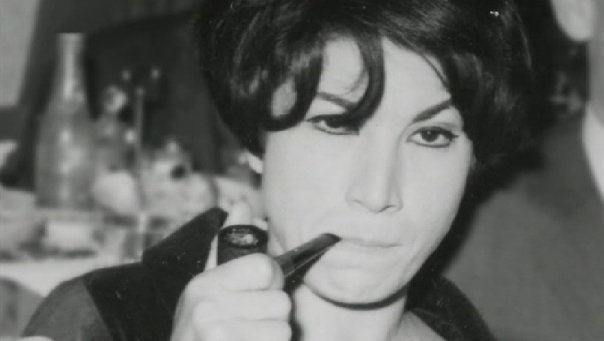
Forough Farrokhzad (1935–1967)

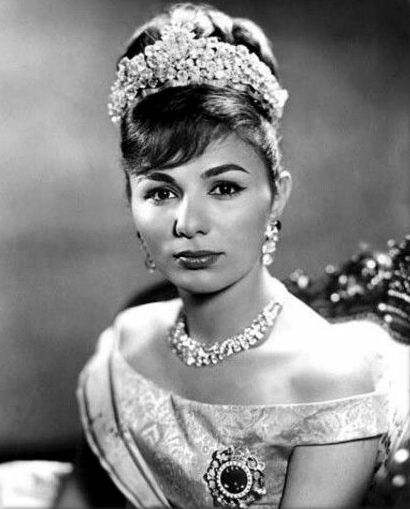
Farah Pahlavi (born 1938)

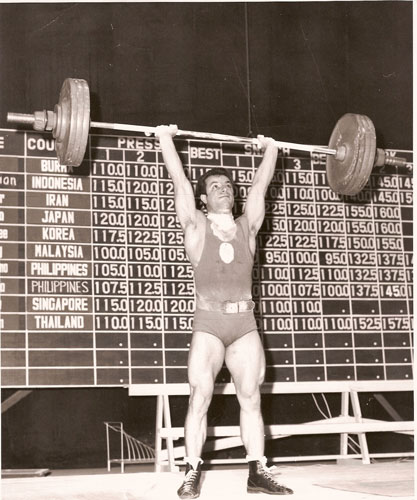
Parviz Jalayer (born 1939)

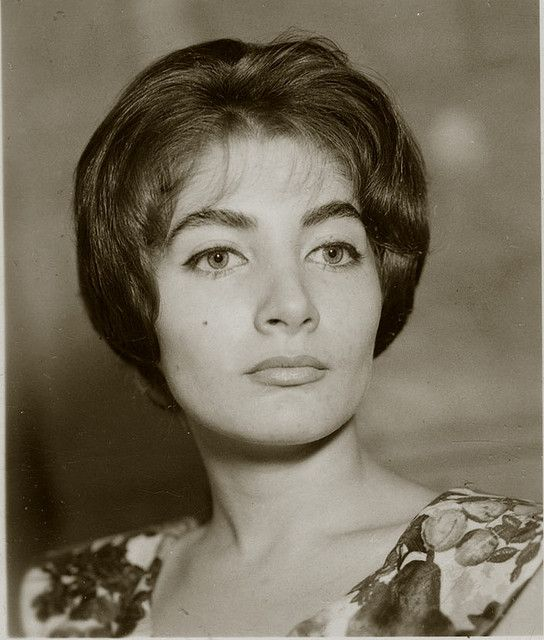
Shahnaz Pahlavi (born 1940)

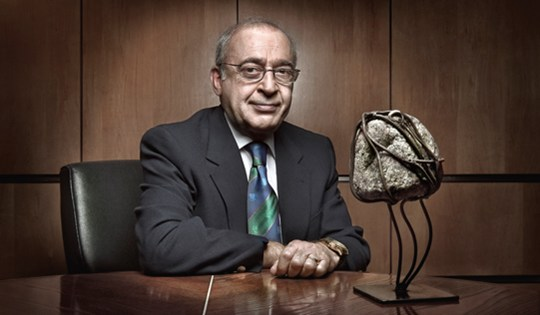
Moussa B. H. Youdim (born 1940)

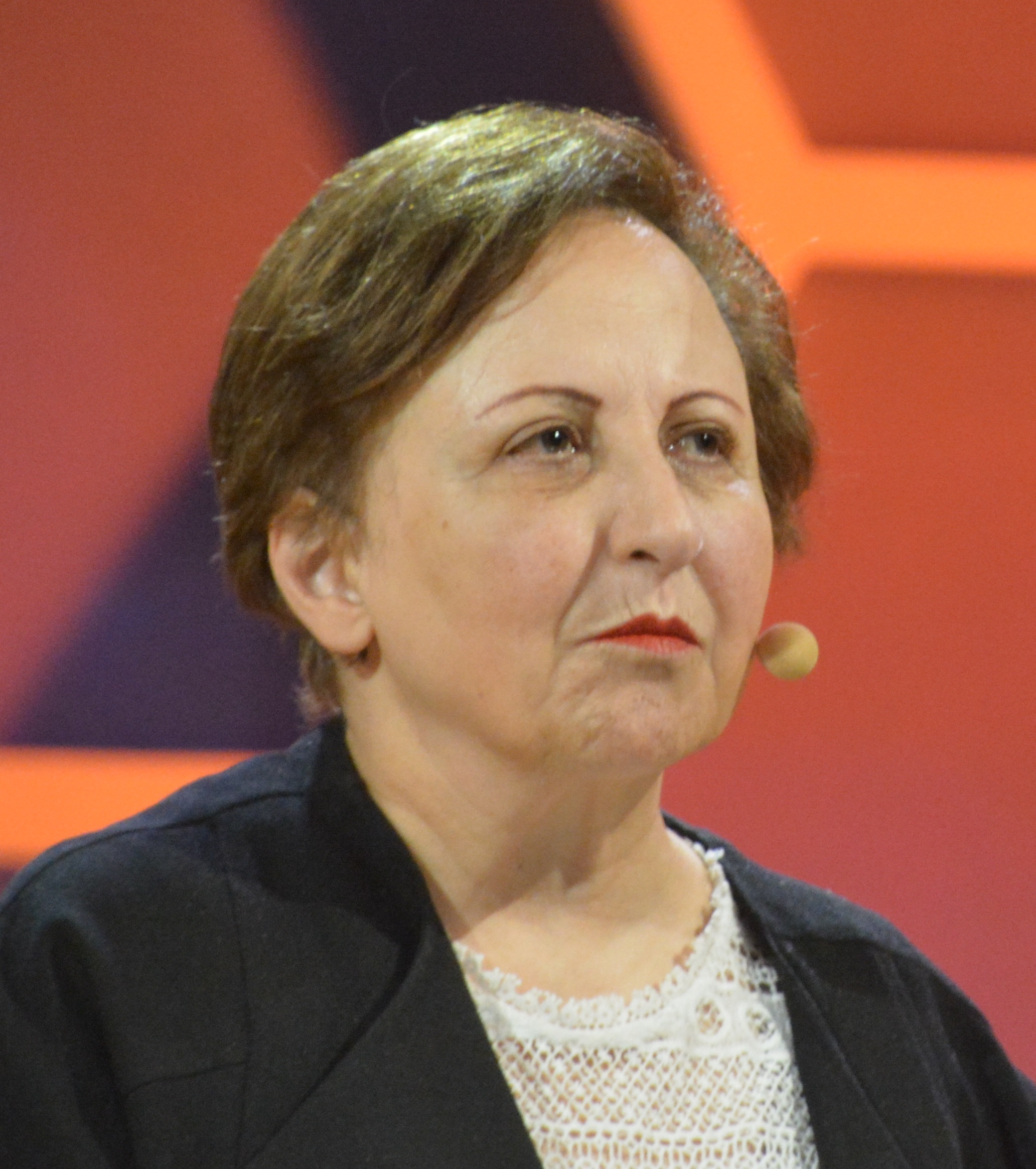
Shirin Ebadi (born 1941)

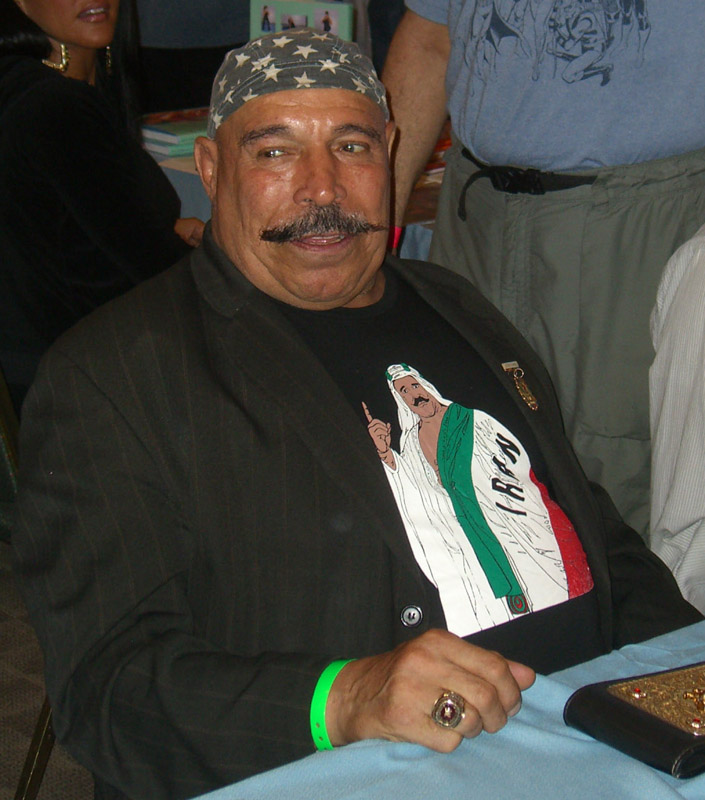
Khosrow Vaziri (1942–2023)

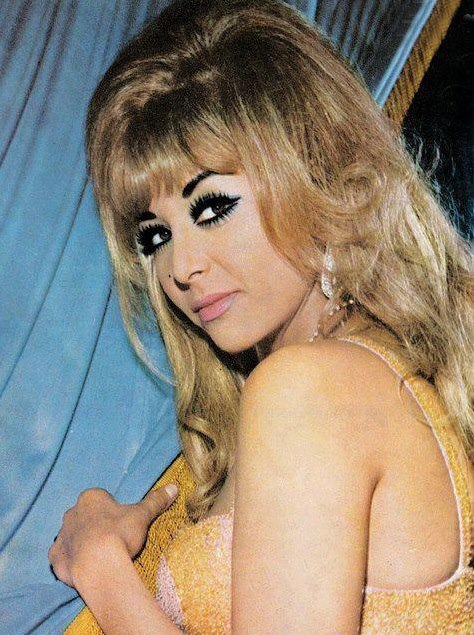
Jamileh (born 1946)

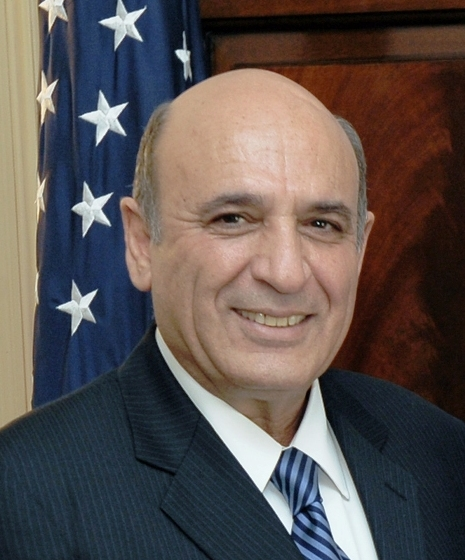
Shaul Mofaz (born 1948)

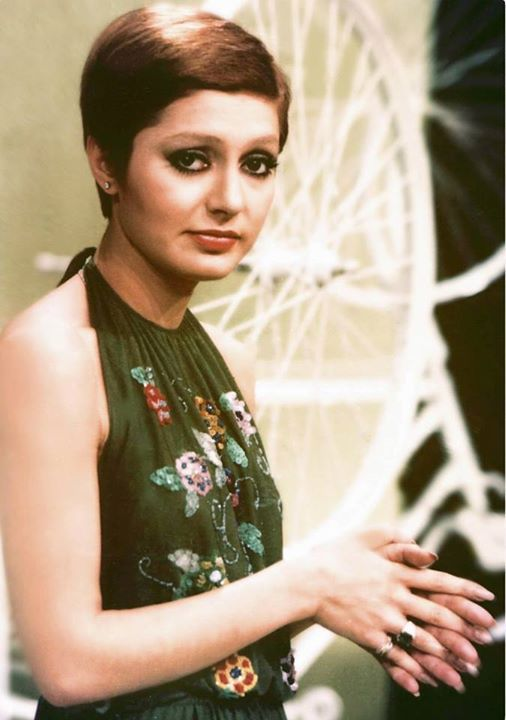
Googoosh (born 1950)

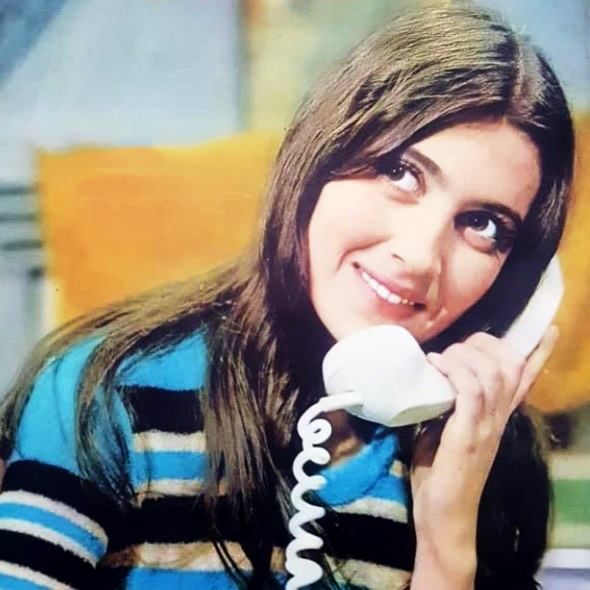
Mary Apick (born 1954)

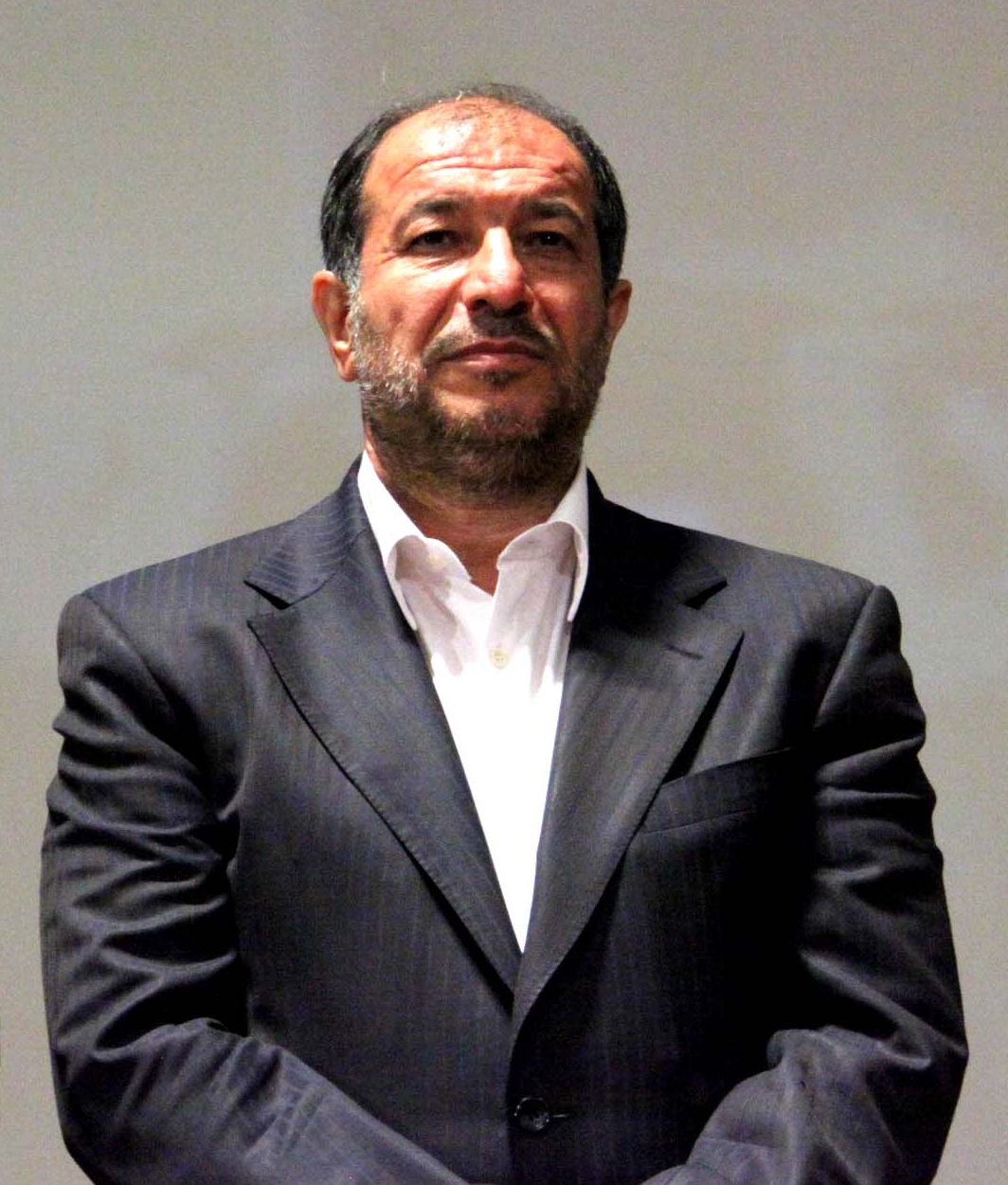
Mostafa Mohammad-Najjar (born 1956)

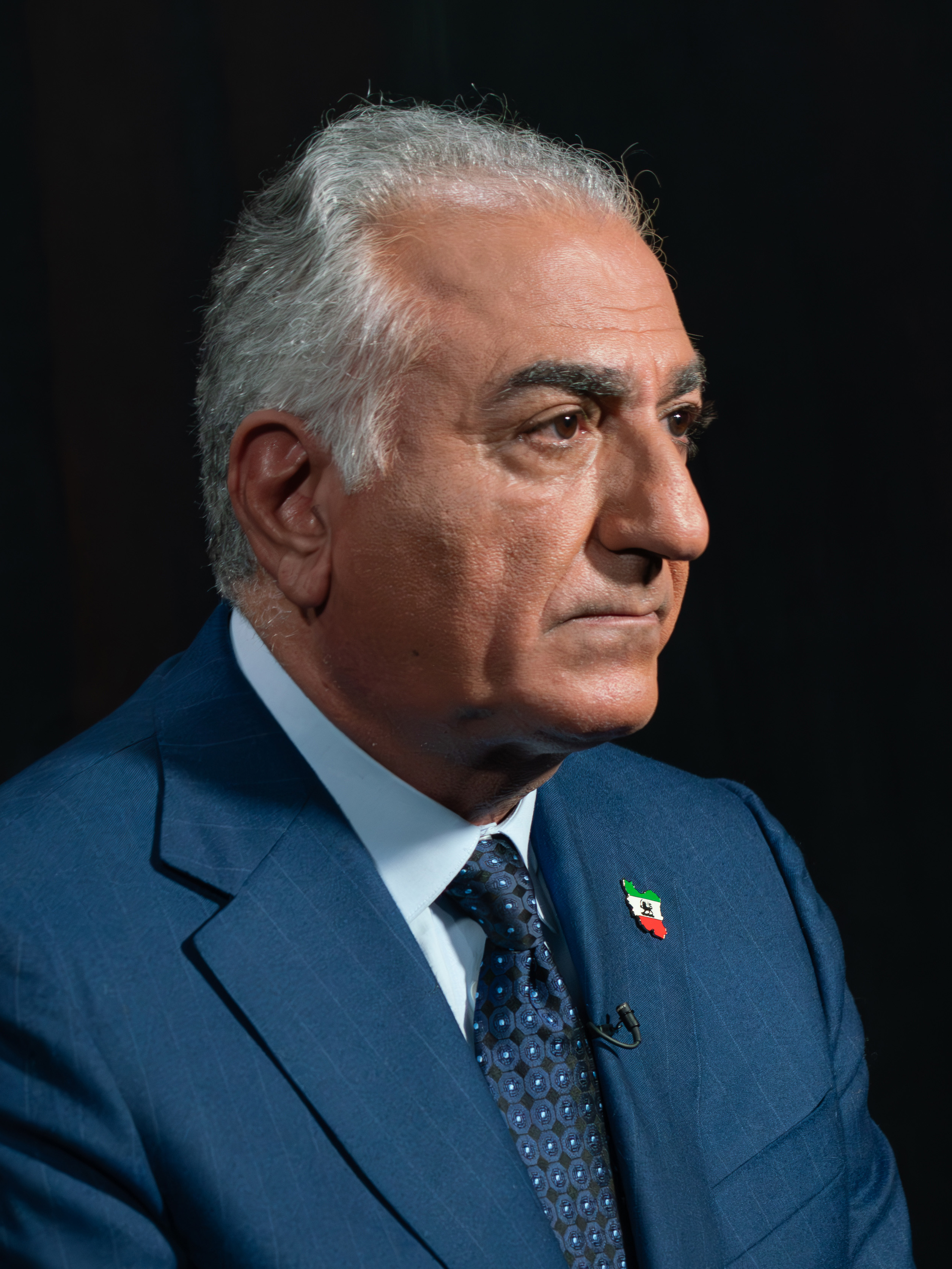
Reza Pahlavi (born 1960)

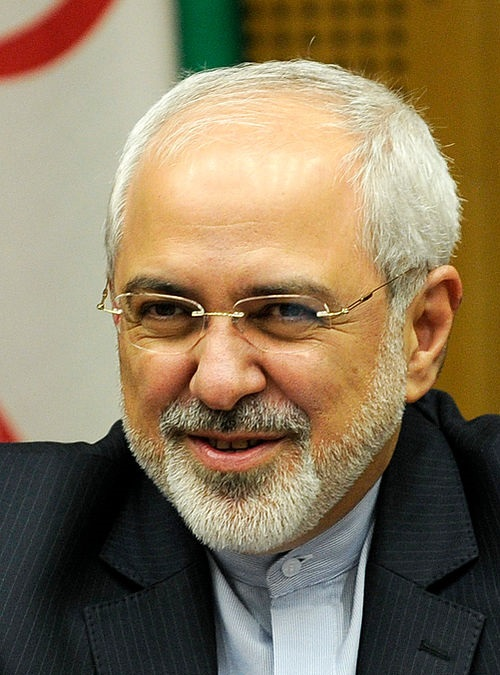
Mohammad Javad Zarif (born 1960)

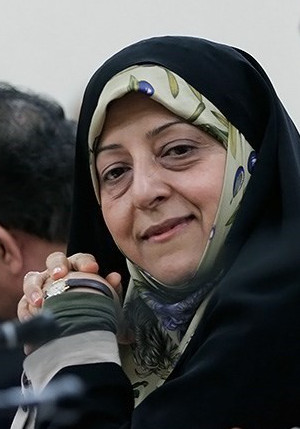
Masoumeh Ebtekar (born 1960)

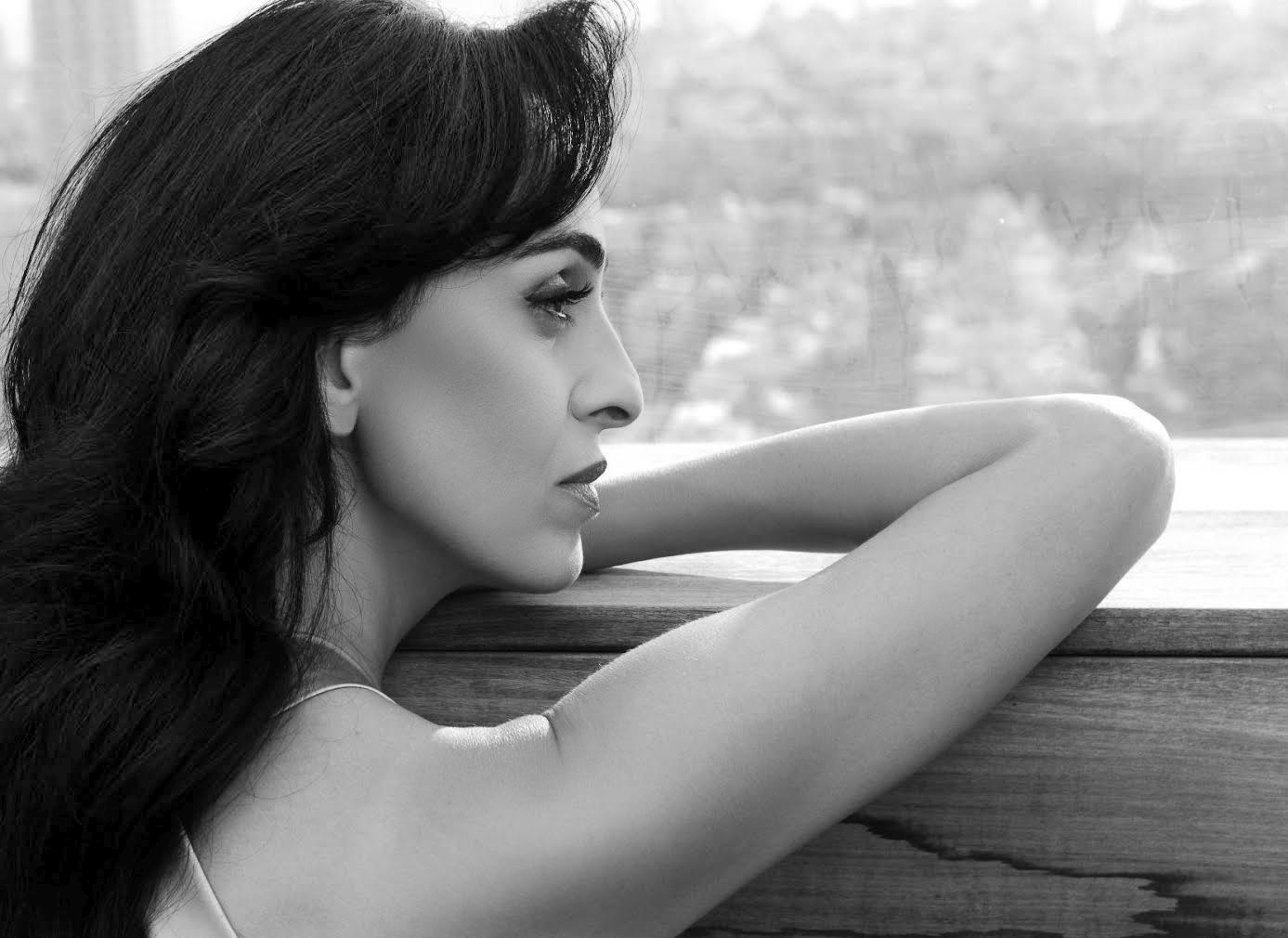
Rita (born 1962)

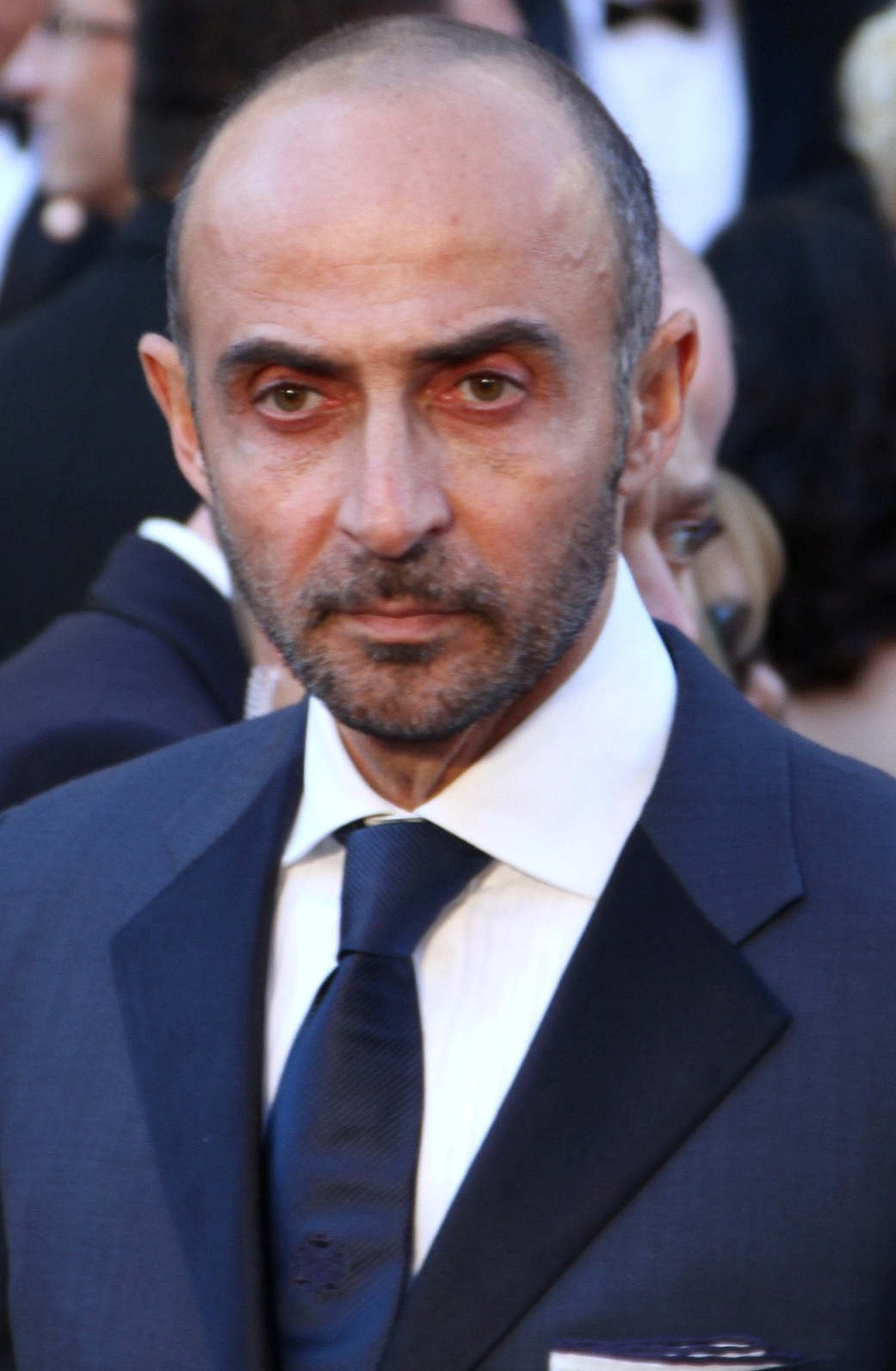
Shaun Toub (born 1963)

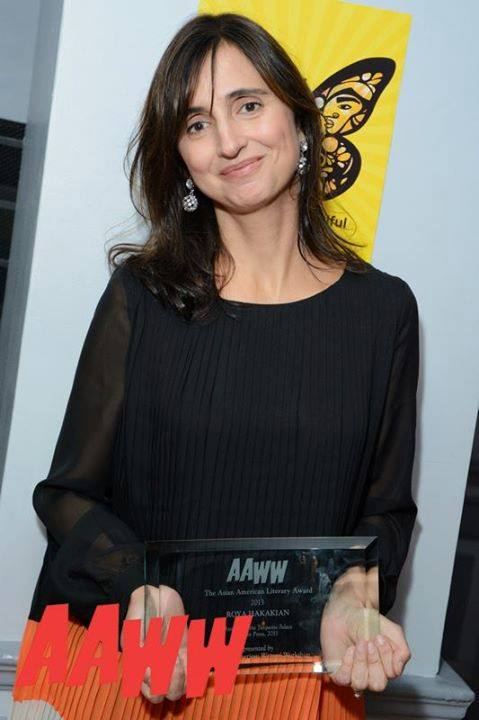
Roya Hakakian (born 1966)

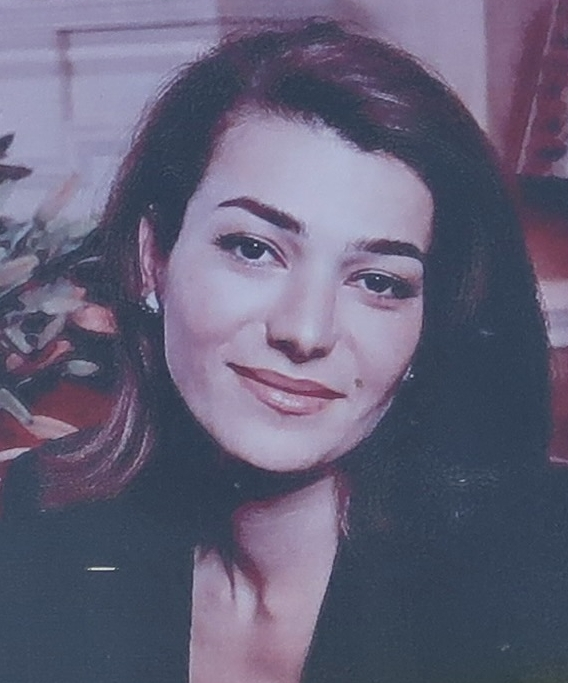
Leila Pahlavi; credit: Polymagou - CC BY-SA (born 1970)

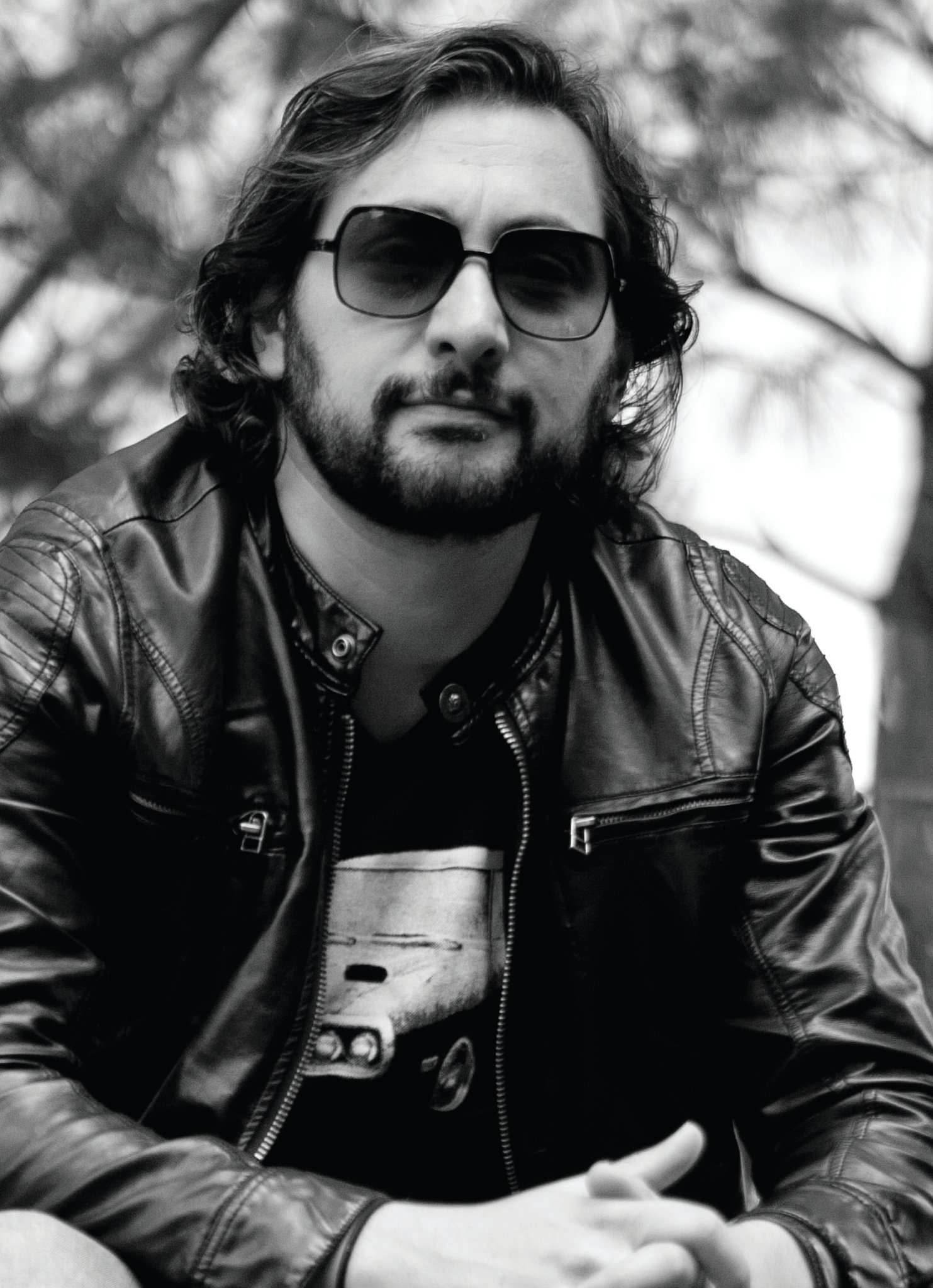
Sharam (born 1970)

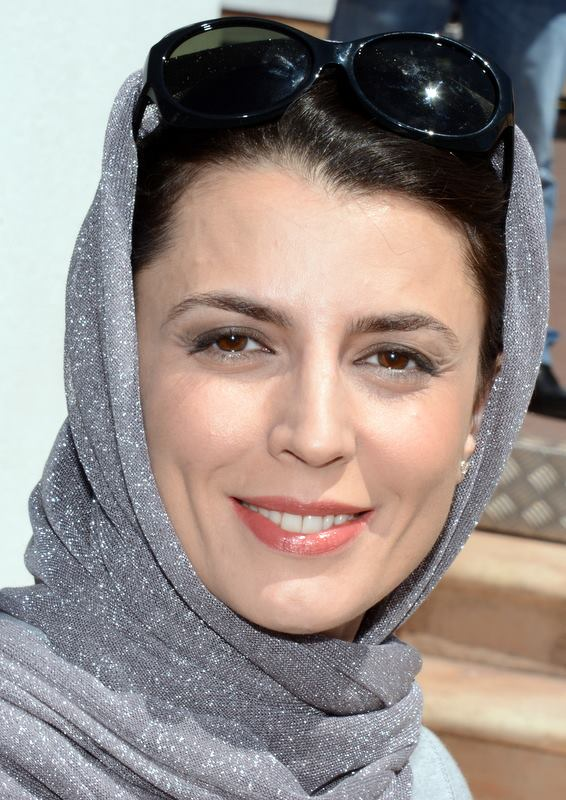
Leila Hatami (born 1972)

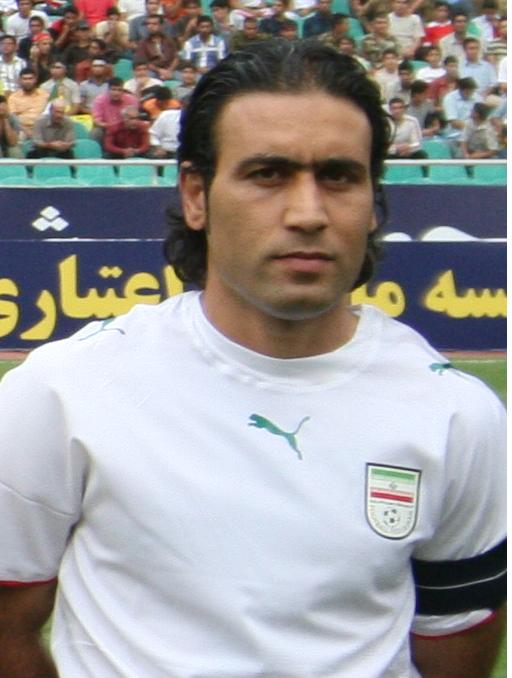
Mehdi Mahdavikia (born 1977)

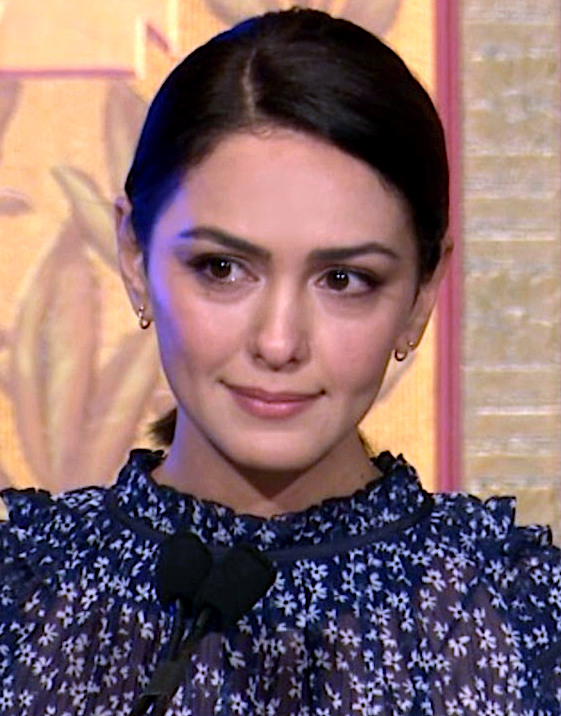
Nazanin Boniadi (born 1980)

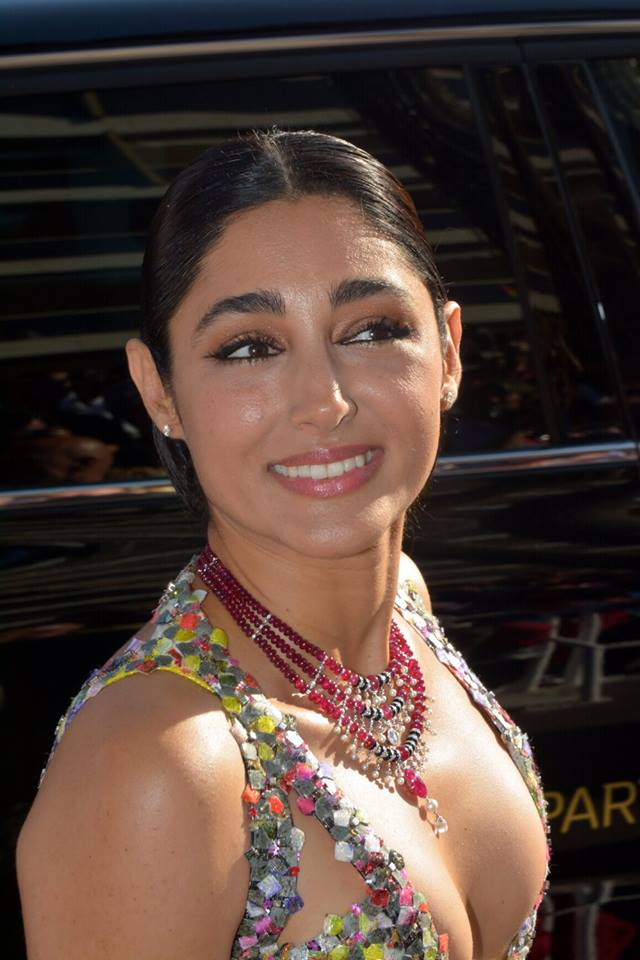
Golshifteh Farahani (born 1983)

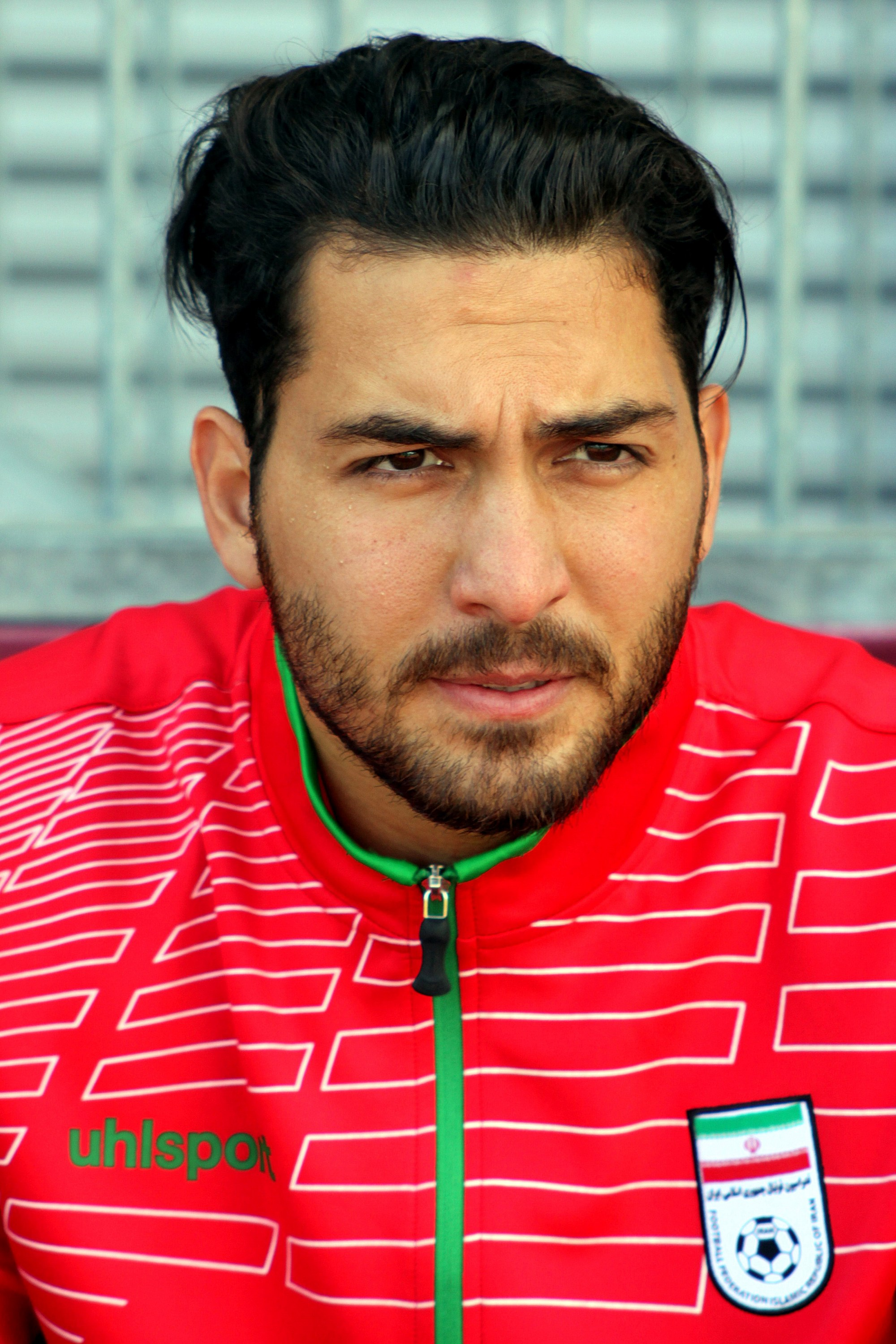
Alireza Haghighi (born 1988)

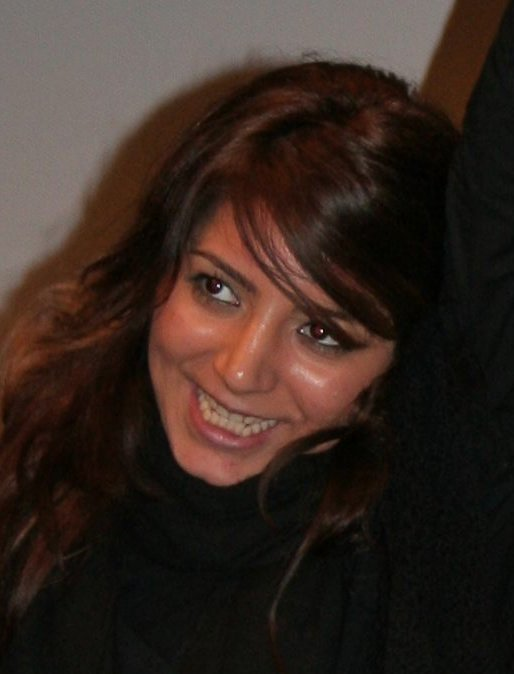
Hana Makhmalbaf (born 1988)

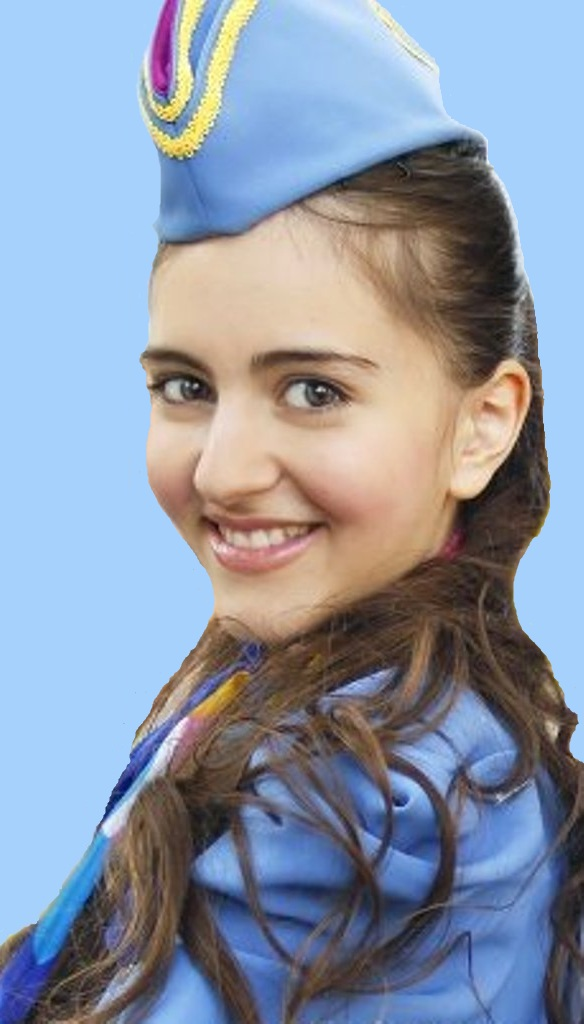
Dalita Avanesian (born 1999)

=== Prior to the 19th century ===
- Mirza Ghiyas Beg (c. 1544–1621), nobleman and Grand vizier of the Mughal Empire

=== 1801–1900 ===
- Baháʼu'lláh (1817–1892), founder of the Bahá'í faith
- Subh-i-Azal (1831–1912), Persian religious leader of Azali Bábism
- Abdol-samad Mirza Ezz ed-Dowleh (1843–1929), prince and governor
- `Abdu'l-Bahá (1844–1921), former head of the Bahá'í faith
- Antoin Sevruguin (1851–1933), photographer
- Morteza Gholi Khan Hedayat (1856–1911), politician and first chairman of the Iranian parliament
- Mirza Ali Asghar Khan Amin al-Soltan (1858–1907), Prime Minister of Iran
- Mehdi Qoli Hedayat (1863–1955), Prime Minister of Iran
- Vosugh od-Dowleh (1868–1951), Prime Minister of Qajar era Iran
- Mohammad Ali Foroughi (1877–1942), Three-time Prime Minister of Iran
- Hossein Ala' (1881–1964), Prime Minister of Iran in 1951 and from 1955 to 1957
- Abol-Ghasem Kashani (1882–1962), Twelver Shia Muslim cleric and Chairman of the Parliament of Iran
- Mohammad Mosaddegh (1882–1967), Prime Minister of Iran from 1951 to 1953
- Ali Akbar Bahman (1883–1967), diplomat and politician
- Ali Mansur (1886–1974), Prime Minister of Iran
- Harold Nicolson (1886–1968), English diplomat, author, diarist and politician
- Sulayman Hayyim (1887–1970), lexicographer, translator, playwright and essayist
- Firouz Nosrat-ed-Dowleh III (1889–1937), prince and statesman
- Abolqasem Najm (1892–1983), diplomat and politician
- Hossein Joudat (1892–1990), cultural, political, media and literary figure
- André Sevruguin (1896–1996), miniature painter
- Ahmad Matin-Daftari (1897–1971), Prime Minister of Iran
- Nasrollah Entezam (1900–1980), diplomat
- Mohammad Hejazi (1900–1974), novelist, short-story writer, playwright, essayist, translator

=== 1901–1930 ===
- Ali Razmara (1901–1951), military leader and prime minister of Iran
- Sadegh Hedayat (1903–1951), writer, translator and intellectual
- Bozorg Alavi (1904–1997), writer, novelist, and political intellectual
- Turan Amirsoleimani (1905–1994), aristocrat and third wife of Reza Shah
- Ali Amini (1905–1992), politician and writer, Prime Minister of Iran from 1961 to 1962
- Mohsen Foroughi (1907–1983), architect
- Mehdi Bazargan (1907–1995), politician and activist, Prime Minister of the Interim Government of Iran in 1979
- Rahi Mo'ayyeri (1909–1968), poet and musician
- Mohammad Gharib (1909–1975), pediatrician and professor
- Abbas Ali Khalatbari (1912–1979), diplomat
- Davud Monshizadeh (1915–1989), Nazi, founder of Sumka (the "Iranian National Socialist Workers Party")
- Shamsi Hekmat (1917–1997), Iranian-American educator, philanthropist, pioneered reforms in women's status in Iran
- Shams Pahlavi (1917–1996), the elder sister of Mohammad Reza Pahlavi, the last Shah of Iran
- Amir-Abbas Hoveyda (1919–1979), economist and politician
- Mohammad Reza Pahlavi (1919–1980), Shah of Iran from 1941 until his overthrow by the 1979 Iranian Revolution
- Amir Khosrow Afshar (1919–1999), diplomat
- Nasser Moghaddam (1921–1979), the fourth and last chief of SAVAK
- Alenush Terian (1921–2011), astronomer and physicist, first female professor of physics in Iran
- Heydar Ghiai (1922–1985), architect
- Hassan Ali Mansur (1923–1965), politician, Prime Minister from 1963 to 1965
- Gholam Reza Pahlavi (1923–2017), prince, president of the National Olympic Committee
- Jalal Al-e-Ahmad (1923–1969), writer, thinker and social and political critic
- Abdul Reza Pahlavi (1924–2004), prince
- Abdollah Mojtabavi (1925–2012), freestyle wrestling athlete
- Ahmad Reza Pahlavi (1925–1981), prince
- Sadegh Nezam-mafi (1925–2009), physician and medical pioneer
- Ali Javan (1926–2016), Iranian-American physicist and inventor at MIT
- Simin Behbahani (1927–2014), poet, lyricist and activist
- Ray Aghayan (1928–2011), costume designer
- Fatemeh Pahlavi (1928–1987), princess
- Masoud Boroumand (1928–2011), footballer
- Ardeshir Zahedi (1928–2021), diplomat
- Lotfi Mansouri (1929–2013), opera director and manager
- Ali Mirzaei (1929–2020), weightlifter
- Mahmoud Mollaghasemi (born 1929), freestyle wrestler
- Izak Parviz Nazarian (1929 –2017), Tehran -born American businessman, investor, real-estate developer, and philanthropist
- Ezzatollah Sahabi (1930–2011), scholar, humanitarian, democracy activist, politician and former Parliament member
- Gholamreza Takhti (1930–1968), Olympic gold medalist wrestler

=== 1931–1950 ===
- Mohammad Ali Fardin (1931–2000), wrestler and actor
- Younes Nazarian (1931 – 2022), Iranian-American businessman, investor, and philanthropist
- Mostafa Chamran (1932–1981), physicist, politician and commander
- Nasser Givehchi (1932–2017), wrestler
- Seyyed Hossein Nasr (born 1933), Iranian-American University Professor of Islamic studies at George Washington University and Islamic philosopher
- Forough Farrokhzad (1935–1967), poet and film director
- Iraj Ghaderi (1935–2012), film director and actor
- Bahman Nirumand (born 1936), Iranian and German journalist and author
- Kamran Diba (born 1937), architect
- Irán Eory (1937–2002), actress; moved to Mexico
- Majid Samii (born 1937), neurosurgeon and medical scientist
- Hossein Zenderoudi (born 1937), painter and sculptor
- Bahram Beyzai (1938–2025), film director and playwright
- Keyvan Khosrovani (born 1938), architect, lighting designer, fashion designer and couturier
- Farah Pahlavi (born 1938), Queen and Empress of Iran from 1959 until the 1979 Iranian Revolution
- Parviz Jalayer (1939–2019), weightlifter and Olympic silver medalist
- Dariush Mehrjui (1939–2023), director, screenwriter, producer, film editor
- Kamran Shirdel (born 1939), documentarist
- Bijan (1940–2011), designer of menswear and fragrances
- Homa Darabi (1940–1994), Iranian-American political activist against forced hijab, affiliated with the secular Nation Party of Iran; professor of child psychiatry, physician; set herself on fire in Tehran's Tajrish Square to protest Iran's restrictions of women's rights
- Henry Elghanayan (born 1940), Tehran-born American real estate developer
- Abbas Kiarostami (1940–2016), film director, screenwriter, photographer and film producer
- Shahnaz Pahlavi (born 1940), Princess of Iran
- Moussa B. H. Youdim (born 1940), Tehran-born Israeli neuroscientist specializing in neurochemistry and neuropharmacology.
- Parvin Darabi (born 1941), Iranian–American author and women's rights activist; speaks out against Iran's regime and Islam
- Kamran Hakim (born 1941), Tehran-born American real estate businessman
- Barbet Schroeder (born 1941), Iranian-born Swiss film director and producer
- Rafael Minaskanian (born 1941), musician and pianist
- Hayedeh (1942–1990; also known as Ma'soumeh Dadehbala), pop and classical singer; lived in Los Angeles
- Khosrow Vaziri (1942–2023), professional wrestler and actor
- Homa Katouzian (born 1942), economist, historian, sociologist and literary critic
- Ali Hatami (1944–1996), film director, screenwriter, art director and costume designer
- Kamal Kharazi (1944–2026), politician and diplomat
- Younan Nowzaradan (born 1944), Iranian-born American surgeon and TV personality
- Sohrab Shahid-Saless (1944–1998), film director and screenwriter
- Gholam-Ali Haddad-Adel (born 1945), philosopher and politician
- Mohammad Nassiri (born 1945), weightlifter and Olympic gold medalist
- Abdolkarim Soroush (born 1945), thinker and reformer
- Jamileh (born 1946), Iranian-American actress, cabaret performer, and dancer
- Mahasti (1946–2007), Persian classical, folk, and pop music singer; lived in California
- Ali Parvin (born 1946), football player and coach
- Shahrnush Parsipur (1946–2026), novelist and translator
- Mohammad Reza Adelkhani (born 1947), footballer
- Mansour Barzegar (born 1947), wrestler
- Jamal Ejlali (1947–2025), actor
- Shaul Mofaz (born 1948), Israeli politician and Israel Defense Forces Chief of Staff
- Firouzeh Vokhshouri (born 1948), Princess Firouzeh Asem of Jordan
- Ebi (born 1949), singer
- Nasser Hejazi (1949–2011), football player and coach
- Farzaneh Kaboli (born 1949), a leader in Iranian folkloric and national dance art, actress
- Googoosh (born 1950), singer, songwriter, and actress of Iranian Azerbaijani origin; moved to Canada
- Hassan Mehmani (born 1950), actor and director

=== 1951–1960 ===
- Andranik Eskandarian (born 1951), Iranian-American footballer
- Mansoor Hekmat (1951–2002), Marxist theorist and leader of the worker-communist movement
- Shohreh Aghdashloo (born Vaziri-Tabar, 1952), Iranian-American actress
- Seyed Mostafa Azmayesh (born 1952), France based Iranian religious scholar
- Parviz Davoodi (1952–2024), hardline conservative politician
- Valentine Moghadam (born 1952), Iranian-American feminist scholar, sociologist, activist and author, Professor of Sociology and International Affairs; Director of International Affairs Program and Director of Middle East Studies Program, Northeastern University
- Alexios Schandermani (born 1953), writer
- Maryam Rajavi (born 1953), President of the National Council of Resistance of Iran; leader of the People's Mujahedin of Iran, lives in France
- Daryush Shokof (born 1954), writer, film director, artist and film producer based in Germany
- Mary Apick (born 1954), Iranian-Armenian stage, television and film actress; moved to the United States
- Joseph Moinian (born 1954), Tehran-born American investor, real estate developer, and philanthropist
- Hadi Teherani (born 1954), German-Iranian architect and designer
- Neil Kadisha (born 1955), Tehran-born American businessman, investor, and philanthropist
- Darius Khondji (born 1955), Iranian-French cinematographer
- Azar Nafisi (born 1955), Iranian-American writer and professor of English literatureI at Tehran University and Johns Hopkins University
- Feizollah Nasseri (born 1955), weightlifter
- Goli Ameri (born 1956), Iranian-American diplomat and businesswoman
- Afsaneh Beschloss (born 1956), Iranian-born American former treasurer of the World Bank, economist, entrepreneur, and investor, CEO of RockCreek, an investment firm that she founded
- Ramin Jahanbegloo (born 1956), philosopher and academic
- Elaheh Koulaei (born 1956), Professor of political science, Faculty of Law and Political Sciences, Tehran University; politician
- Mostafa Mohammad-Najjar (born 1956), politician and army general
- Mohsen Makhmalbaf (born 1957), film director, writer, film editor and producer
- Abbas Maroufi (1957– 2022), novelist and journalist
- Andranik Madadian (born 1958), Armenian-Iranian singer-songwriter and actor
- Bita Farrahi (1958–2023), actress
- Fariba Adelkhah (born 1959), French-Iranian anthropologist and academic imprisoned in Iran from 2019 until 2023.
- Farzad Bonyadi (born c. 1959), professional poker player
- Efraim Davidi (born1959), Tehran-born Israeli professional footballer
- Majid Majidi (born 1959), film director, film producer and screenwriter
- Ahmad Bourghani (1960–2008), politician, journalist, writer and political analyst
- Masoumeh Ebtekar (born 1960), Vice President of Iran for Women and Family Affairs. Former head of Iran's Department of Environment, recipient of the UN Champions of the Earth Environmental Award
- Vali Nasr (born 1960), American academic and author
- Reza Pahlavi (born 1960), crown prince of Persia
- Cumrun Vafa (born 1960), Iranian-American leading string theorist from Harvard University

=== 1961–1970 ===
- David Nazarian (born 1961), Tehran-born American businessman, investor, and philanthropist
- Bob Yari (born 1961), American film producer and director
- Parastou Forouhar (born 1962), installation artist
- Rita (born 1962), Iranian-born Israeli actress and singer
- Hassan Bastani (born 1962), playwright
- Camila Batmanghelidjh (1963–2024), Iranian-born Belgian author and charity executive in the United Kingdom
- Amir Ghalenoei (born 1963), football coach and player
- Farahnaz Pahlavi (born 1963), the eldest daughter of Mohammad Reza Pahlavi
- Nasrin Sotoudeh (born 1963), human rights lawyer for opposition activists, women protesting mandatory hijab laws, juveniles facing the death penalty, and politicians; imprisoned multiple times in Evin Prison and Qarchak Prison, served a 3-year term, was re-arrested to serve an accumulated 38-year sentence.
- Shaun Toub (born 1963), American film and television actor
- Philippe Blasband (born 1964), filmmaker; writer in French language from Belgium
- Zahra Bahrami (1965–2011), dual Dutch and Iranian citizen arrested during a political protest, imprisoned in Evin Prison, and later convicted for drug trafficking and executed by hanging
- Anna Kaplan (née Monahemi; born 1965), Iranian-born American, member of the New York State Senate
- Rosie Malek-Yonan (born 1965), Assyrian-American actress, author, director and activist of Assyrian ethnicity
- Marina Nemat (born 1965), Canadian–Iranian human rights activist, past political prisoner and memoirist, imprisoned for over two years in Evin Prison
- Marjan Davari (born 1966), researcher, translator and writer, held in Evin Prison and Qarchak Prison and sentenced to death for "spreading corruption on earth" by promotingTibetan Buddhism, Hinduism, and Eckankar; imprisoned since 2015.
- Afshin Ellian (born 1966), Iranian-Dutch professor of law, philosopher, poet and critic of political Islam
- Roya Hakakian (born 1966), Iranian-American Jewish human rights activist, poet, journalist, and writer.
- Reza Mirkarimi (born 1966), film writer and director
- Maryam Namazie (born 1966), British–Iranian secularist, communist and human rights activist, writer, commentator, and broadcaster; vocal critic of Islamism and sharia law; the leader of the Council of Ex-Muslims of Britain
- Ali-Reza Pahlavi (1966–2011), member of the Pahlavi Imperial Family of Iran
- Jasmin Tabatabai (born 1967), Iranian-German actress
- Mani Haghighi (born 1969), filmmaker, screenwriter and actor
- Abbas Jadidi (born 1969), wrestler
- Albert Elay Shaltiel (born 1969), Tehran-born Israeli founder and director of the ILAI Fund which assists children with disabilities.
- Azam Ali (born 1970), Iranian American singer and musician
- Amir Ansari (born 1970), Iranian-American Chief Technology Officer and co-founder of Prodea Systems
- Shokufeh Kavani (born 1970), Iranian-born Australian contemporary painter, translator and artist
- Leila Pahlavi (1970–2001), youngest daughter of Mohammad Reza Pahlavi, Shah of Iran
- Sharam (born 1970), Iranian-American progressive house DJ and producer

=== 1971–1980 ===
- Arash Hejazi (born 1971), novelist, fiction writer and translator of literary works from English and Portuguese into Persian
- Niki Karimi (born 1971), actress, film director and screenwriter
- Mansour (born 1971), Iranian Azerbaijani artist
- Alireza Mansourian (born 1971), football coach and player
- Sam Mizrahi (born 1971), Iranian-born Canadian real estate developer
- Tina Gharavi (born 1972), Iranian-born British screenwriter and director
- Leila Hatami (born 1972), actress, was in the Academy Award-winning film A Separation
- Atoosa Rubenstein (born Atoosa Behnegar, 1972), Iranian-American founder and editor of CosmoGirl magazine; editor of Seventeen
- Tami Stronach (born 1972), Israeli American dancer and choreographer
- Camelia Entekhabifard (born 1973), Iranian-American journalist and author
- Ali Tabatabaee (born 1973), Iranian-American rapper, singer, musician in band Zebrahead
- Cassandra Clare (born 1973), American author of young adult fiction
- Kirill Pirogov (born 1973), Russian film and theatre actor and composer
- Shadi Sadr (born 1974), feminist activist, lawyer and journalist, based in the United Kingdom
- DJ Aligator (born 1975), Iranian-Danish producer and DJ
- Sam Nazarian (born 1975), Iranian American businessman, investor, and philanthropist
- Marjan Neshat (born 1975), actress nominated for 2025 Tony Award for Best Featured Actress in a Play for English; moved to the United States
- Omid Nouripour (born 1975), Iranian-German politician
- Pardis Sabeti (born 1975), Iranian-American geneticist at Harvard Medical School
- Bahar Soomekh (born 1975), Iranian-American actress, Crash and Saw III
- Bijan Djir-Sarai (born 1976), Iranian-born German politician
- Vahid Hashemian (born 1976), footballer and coach
- Roxana Manouchehri (born 1976), visual artist
- Saba Soomekh (born 1976), Iranian-born American professor of religious studies at UCLA and Loyola Marymount University
- Mahnaz Afshar (born 1977), Iranian-born German actress
- Arash (born 1977), Iranian-Swedish singer, entertainer and producer
- Mehdi Mahdavikia (born 1977), football player
- Marsha Mehran (1977–2014), novelist
- Maryam Mirzakhani (1977–2017), mathematician and the first woman to win the Fields Medal, professor of mathematics at Princeton University and Stanford University; moved to California
- Laleh Seddigh (born 1977), female race car driver
- Mahnaz Afshar (born 1978), Iranian-born German actress
- Ameneh Bahrami (born 1978), woman blinded in an acid attack
- Antonio Esfandiari (born 1978), Iranian-American professional poker player
- Ramin Karimloo (born 1978), Iranian-Canadian actor and singer
- Nazanin Zaghari-Ratcliffe (born 1978), British-Iranian imprisoned for 5 years after being found guilty of "plotting to topple the Iranian government"
- Nazanin Afshin-Jam (born 1979), Iranian-Canadian human rights activist, author and public speaker, and former Miss World Canada
- Shahrzad Rafati (born 1979), Iranian-Canadian CEO of BroadbandTV Corp (BBTV)
- Azadeh Shahshahani (born 1979), Iranian–American human rights lawyer and former president of the National Lawyers Guild
- Yashar Samimi Mofakham (born 1980), curator and visual artist
- Navíd Akhavan (born 1980), Iranian-German actor
- Tarlan Rafiee (born 1980), curator and visual artist
- Nazanin Boniadi (born 1980), Iranian-born British, London-based actress
- Samira Makhmalbaf (born 1980), filmmaker and script writer
- Narges Rashidi (born 1980), American-German actress
- Zahra Bani Yaghoub (1980–2007), medical doctor, arrested by the Guidance Patrol for breaching modesty laws by sitting in a park with her fiance, died in prison in Hamedan
- Sami Yusuf (born 1980), British singer-songwriter, composer and producer of Iranian Azerbaijani descent

=== 1981–2000 ===
- Zahra Amir Ebrahimi (born 1981), Iranian-French actress and social photographer, subject of a 2006 sex tape scandal in Iran, sentenced to 6 months in prison and 90 lashes
- Masoud Kazemi (born 1981), journalist and human rights activist
- Taraneh Mousavi (1981–2009), arrested for protesting the 2009 election results, died after being sexually abused while in custody
- Nasim Pedrad (born 1981), Iranian-American actress and comedian
- Amir Hossein Sadeghi (born 1981), football player
- Nina Zanjani (born 1981), Iranian-Swedish actress
- Sirvan Khosravi (born 1982), pop singer and composer
- Amir Shapourzadeh (born 1982), Iranian-German footballer
- Vahid Talebloo (born 1982), football goalkeeper
- Neda Agha-Soltan (1983–2009), shot and killed during the 2009 Iranian election protests; her name quickly became a rallying cry for the opposition
- Golshifteh Farahani (born 1983), Iranian-French actress
- Andranik Teymourian (born 1983), footballer
- Aylar Lie (born 1984), Iranian-born Norwegian actress, model, singer, former pornographic actress
- Elshan Moradi (born 1985), Iranian-American chess grandmaster
- Gegard Mousasi (born 1985), Dutch mixed martial artist
- Behrang Safari (born 1985), Iranian-Swedish footballer
- Fatemeh Behboudi (born 1985), photojournalist
- Elham Azizi (born 1986), Iranian-American biomedical scientist and professor at Columbia University
- Niloufar Bayani (born 1986), wildlife conservation biology researcher and activist; jailed in Iran
- Ashkan Dejagah (born 1986), professional footballer
- Mohammad Bagheri Motamed (born 1986), taekwondo practitioner
- Omid Abolhassani (born 1988), football player banned for four years
- Alireza Haghighi (born 1988), goalkeeper
- Marjan Kalhor (born 1988), alpine skier
- Hana Makhmalbaf (born 1988), filmmaker
- Mohammad Parvin (born 1988), football player
- Atousa Pourkashiyan (born 1988), Iranian-American chess player; Woman Grandmaster
- Mohammad Kiadarbandsari (born 1989), alpine skier
- Sara Nicole Andersen (born 1992), Norwegian-Iranian Miss Universe Norway 2012
- Milad Mohammadi (born 1993), footballer
- Atefe Asadi (born 1994), poet, author, translator, editor, and lyricist
- Dalita Avanesian (born 1999), Armenian singer, participant in Junior Eurovision Song Contest 2011

=== Full date unknown ===
- Mina Bissell, Iranian-American biochemist, Director of University of California, Berkeley Life Sciences Division
- Maryam Eslamdoust, politician and trade union official
- Nikta Fakhri, Iranian-American physics professor at MIT
- Omid Habibinia, journalist and organization founder
- Farzaneh Milani (born 1947), Iranian-born American Director of Studies in Women and Gender; Professor of Persian and Women Studies at the University of Virginia in Charlottesville, Virginia, United States
- Sharon Nazarian (born 1967), Iranian-born American social activist, academic, clinical psychologist, and philanthropist
- Tali Farhadian Weinstein (born in 1975 or 1976), Iranian-born American attorney, professor at Columbia Law School and NYU Law School, and politician
- Hashem Yekezareh, engineer and industrial executive
- Gale Paridjanian, guitarist and co-founder of Turin Brakes (born in Tehran in 1970s)

== Lived in Tehran ==
- Naser al-Din Shah Qajar (1831–1896), Shah of Iran from 1848 to 1896
- Shirin Ebadi (born 1947), lawyer
- Majid Entezami (born 1948), musician and composer
- Kayhan Kalhor (born 1963), Kamancheh player, composer and master of classical Kurdish and Iranian traditional music
- Hadi Saei (born 1976), taekwondo athlete
