= Manouchehri =

Manouchehri is an Iranian surname. Notable people with the surname include:

- Alí Manouchehri (born 1986), Iranian footballer
- Amin Manouchehri (born 1986), Iranian footballer
- Roxana Manouchehri, Iranian artist
- Manuchehri, 11th-century Persian poet

== See also ==
- Manouchehri House, a historic building in Kashan, Iran
