= Bastani (name) =

Bastani (Persian: باستانی, lit. 'ancient, traditional') is a surname, commonly found in the Persian language. People with this surname include:

- Aaron Bastani (born c. 1983), British journalist and writer
- Hassan Bastani (born 1962), Iranian researcher and designer
- Masoud Bastani (born 1978), Iranian reformist journalist
- Mohammad Ebrahim Bastani Parizi (1924–2014), Iranian historian

== See also ==
- Bastani, an Iranian-style ice cream
