= Sadegh Nezam-mafi =

Iranian nuclear medicine specialist

Dr. Sadegh Nezam-mafi (Persian: صادق نظام‌مافی, 1925 in Tehran – 2009 in Tehran) was an Iranian physician and a pioneer of nuclear medicine in Iran. He introduced nuclear endocrinology to the country in 1960 with a thyroid probe and a rectilinear scanner. In 1972 he published "Diagnostic Value of Liver Scan in Operated Echinococcus Cyst" in the German journal Strahlentherapie Sonderb.
