= Atefe Asadi =

Iranian poet, writer, and translator

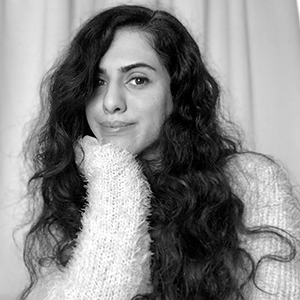
- Born: April 1994 (age 32); Tehran, Iran
- Education: Bachelor's in English Translation

Atefe Asadi (Persian: عاطفه اسدی; born April 1994, Tehran, Iran) is a contemporary Iranian poet, author, translator, editor, and lyricist. She was awarded the Hannah Arendt Fellowship in 2022 and has since resided in Germany.

== Early life and education ==
Atefe Asadi was born in Tehran, Iran. She earned a bachelor's degree in English Translation Studies. In 2022, she emigrated to Germany and currently resides in Hannover.

== Literary career ==
Asadi collaborated with various literary magazines and websites in Iran, including "Sayeh-ha", "Konsefr", "Ketabchi", and "Morva". However, the Ministry of Culture and Islamic Guidance banned all three of her short story collections.

Her works often focus on themes like women's rights, minorities, migration, discrimination, and freedom. They have been translated into multiple languages and published in countries such as Germany and Italy. She frequently participates in workshops and conferences on "literature in exile".

In 2026, Asadi published the poetry collection Schreiben ist Nacht in Germany together with the German author Daniela Dröscher.

== Social and political activities ==
Asadi faced significant challenges in Iran due to the censorship of her works and her participation in protests. She was arrested for her underground distribution of banned writings.

In exile, she has been an outspoken critic of the Iranian regime, advocating for international support for the "Woman, Life, Freedom" movement and for designating the Iranian Revolutionary Guard Corps (IRGC) as a terrorist organization.

Numerous articles by Atefeh Asadi on literature, art, and the political situation in Iran have been published in European journals. One of her essays, titled "We, the people of Iran, have always been alone", was published during the Twelve-Day War between Iran and Israel in the Frankfurter Allgemeine Zeitung. Following strong reader interest, it was translated into English and French and was listed among the notable articles on platforms such as Perlentaucher and Deutschlandfunk Kultur.

== Artistic contributions ==
Asadi collaborated on the "Woman, Life, Freedom" monument, created by German sculptor "Krommel". She also contributes to literary events, including workshops and school readings in Germany.
