= Manouchehri House =

Historic house in Kashan, Iran

- Interactive map of the Manouchehri House area

General information
- Type: Hotel
- Location: 7th Emerat Street, Sabet Alley, Mohtasham Street, Kashan, Iran
- Coordinates: 33°58′53″N 51°27′08″E

Website
- http://www.manouchehrihouse.com/hotel.html

Manouchehri House is a historic house in Kashan, Iran, now in use as a hotel. Its primary architecture dates back to the Safavid dynasty. Manouchehri House was partly ruined by the 1778 earthquake and was rebuilt in the Qajar era. In 2007, the house was bought and registered as a heritage monument, despite being in a state of disrepair. After major restoration work, the house became the first boutique hotel in Iran. It was awarded a Lonely Planet Top Choice award in 2012. It was shortlisted for an Aga Khan Award.
