= Hashem Yekezareh =

Iranian engineer and industrial executive

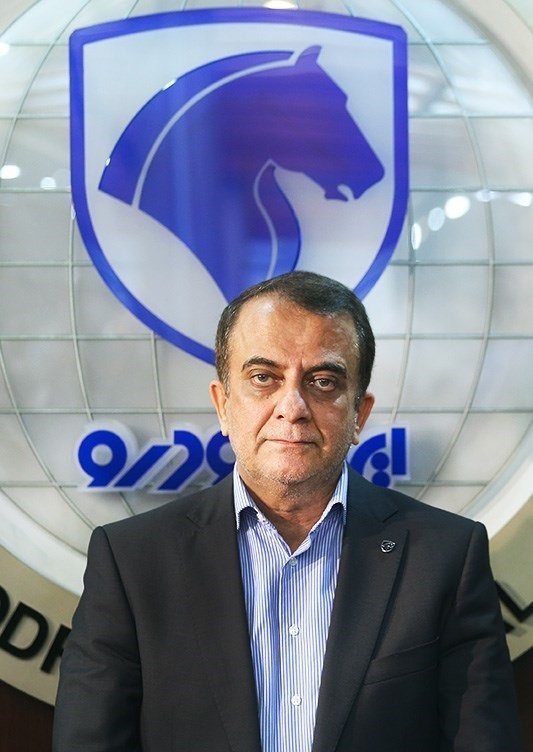
- Born: Tehran, Iran
- Education: Amirkabir University of Technology
- Occupation: CEO of Iran Khodro

Hashem Yekezareh (Persian: هاشم یکه‌زارع) is an Iranian engineer and industrial executive. Previously a senior executive for SAIPA, he serves as the Chairman of the Managing Board of Iran Khodro, Iran's largest car manufacturer since 2013. He was also chairman of Saipa Diesel (12 years), Pars Khodro (7 years) and Iran Khodro Diesel (4 years).

According to Ali Rabiei, the government spokesman, on August 28, 2018, Hashem Yekhzare, the CEO of Iran Khodro, was dismissed from his position due to the "price increase" of the products. An hour after his dismissal, he was arrested in his office on an unknown charge.
