= Masoud Kazemi =

Iranian journalist (born 1981)

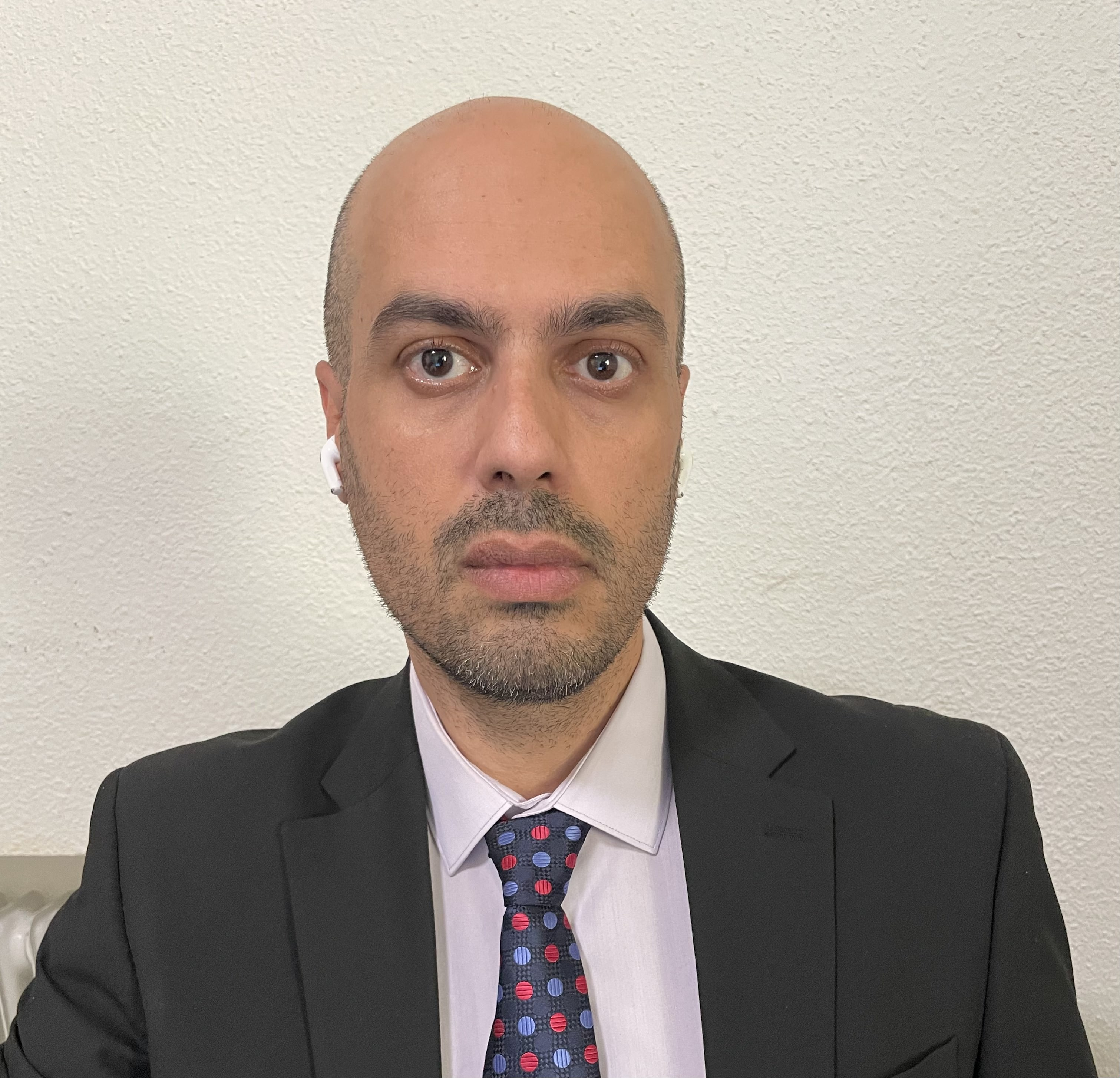
- Born: 17 December 1981 (age 44); Tehran, Iran
- Occupations: Journalist; Editor; Human's rights activist
- Years active: 2009–present
- Known for: extensive reporting on political and economic corruption.

Masoud Kazemi (born 17 December 1981) is an Iranian journalist and human rights activist. He is best known in Iran for his extensive reporting on political and economic corruption, particularly the Babak Zanjani case.

== Activities ==
Kazemi has collaborated with various media outlets, including Shargh newspaper, Ghanoun, Hambastegi, Mardom Emrooz, IRNA news agency, Seda weekly, and Jame’e Pouya weekly, among many other official Iranian media. He was also the editor-in-chief of the political-social monthly magazine Sedaye Parsi for a time. Kazemi also engaged in journalism and human rights advocacy in Iran through his Twitter account. He is the producer of the podcast “Kutena,” which addresses economic and political corruption in Iran.

=== Arrests ===
First Arrest

Kazemi was first arrested on 5 November 2018 by the Islamic Revolutionary Guard Corps (IRGC) Intelligence Organization. After spending six days in solitary confinement in the security ward 2A of Evin Prison, he was released on bail of 100 million tomans.

Second Arrest

Kazemi was again arrested on 22 May 2019, by Branch 28 of the Revolutionary Court of Tehran and was transferred to Evin Prison. Kazemi's lawyer reported that Judge Moghiseh insulted and cursed his client during the trial. Ali Mojtahedzadeh stated that his client was subjected to insults such as “God damn you,” “Your mouth should be filled with gunpowder,” and “May your tongue be cut out” by Judge Moghiseh.

Kazemi's lawyer also noted that the judge issued his verdict against Kazemi before hearing the defendant's defense. On 2 June 2019, while Kazemi was in prison, Branch 28 of the Revolutionary Court sentenced him to four and a half years in prison. This sentence was upheld in the appellate court, but according to Article 134 of the Islamic Penal Code, only two years of it were enforceable: two years for insulting the Supreme Leader, two years for spreading falsehoods, and six months for insulting state officials. Kazemi was also sentenced to a two-year work ban and barred from leaving the country. On 4 April 2020, Kazemi announced that after serving more than one-third of his sentence in Evin Prison and following the judiciary's Nowruz (Persian New Year) directive, he had been released from prison.

== Reactions ==
Kazemi's arrest and imprisonment sparked significant international reactions. Amnesty International, in response to the confirmation of Kazemi's four-and-a-half-year prison sentence, published a statement calling the sentence unjust and demanded his immediate and unconditional release.

On 28 May 2019, The Washington Post reported extensively on the incident, stating that Kazemi, an experienced journalist, was taken to court and imprisoned for tweeting about government corruption and accused of propaganda against the state.

In September 2019, Kazemi was listed among the world's pressured journalists by the Coalition of 10 International Media for Press Freedom. This report was covered by major outlets such as Time magazine and The New York Times.

In January 2020, Kazemi's name appeared on the list of pressured journalists compiled by the Coalition of Forty International Media for Press Freedom, which included journalists who were still in prison following the November 2019 protests in Iran and the subsequent internet shutdown.

In November 2019, PEN International Australia published a report about Kazemi, stating that we must ensure governments cannot silence any pen.

In March 2020, the U.S. State Department released its annual report on human rights violations worldwide, which included references to the continued detention of dual citizens such as Siamak Namazi, environmental activists like Niloufar Bayani, and the sentencing of Kazemi, editor-in-chief of Sedaye Parsi, to four and a half years in prison as examples of human rights violations.

Five hundred sixty-four journalists signed a letter to the heads of the three branches of the Iranian government and members of parliament, demanding the release of Kazemi and Marzieh Amiri, another imprisoned journalist. In this letter, they protested against the “pressure from security agencies” that led to the unemployment of some journalists and also against the “summons and arrests.”
