= Roxana Manouchehri =

Iranian artist

Roxana Manouchehri (Persian: رکسانا منوچهری, born Tehran, Iran 1976) is an Iranian visual artist. Through her work, Manouchehri generally focuses on her surroundings and its essential aspects. Although many Iranians’ lifestyles appear modern, they are still governed largely by conventional, religious attitudes. She addresses the gap of nature and form found between modernism and tradition. She has an M.A. in Painting from the Art University Tehran, Iran, 2001, and a B.A. in Painting from the same university, 1997.

She left Iran in 2007 having been awarded a 6-month Asian Artists Fellowship Program in National Art Studio, Chang-dong, Seoul, South Korea in Oct. 2007. There she exhibited her work in her 'Feel the Expanse' series. She also had several other solo and group shows during her time in South Korea.

In July/August 2010, she was awarded a 2-month residency in Belmont Mill Artist Studios in Co. Offaly, Ireland.

She was also awarded a 4-week residency in Rauma, Finland in early 2011.

Manouchehri currently resides and works in Dublin, Ireland. where she works on an ongoing basis with the Chester Beatty Library hosting workshops for children and adults. She has held several exhibitions in Iran, Dubai, South Korea, Finland, Madrid, London, New York, and Poland and has participated in many domestic and international group shows.

She has been invited to showcase her work in several art fairs and auctions in Seoul, Dubai and Tehran. Some important collectors keep her works worldwide.

Manouchehri have had 7 solo exhibition in Assar Art Gallery in Tehran. Etemad gallery presents her works from 2015.

She was awarded a full stipend artist residency in Can Serrat, Barcelona in April 2013.

In December 2013, Manouchehri had a solo exhibition in the Kevin Kavanagh gallery in Dublin. The show, entitled 'Enigma' was a collaboration with Assar Art Gallery in Tehran. Currently she has a studio in Mountjoy square studios in Dublin. She has worked with organisations, museums, collectives and curators such as IMMA, Trinity college, Roya Khadjavi projects in NY and ArtNomads.
