= Hassan Bastani =

Iranian researcher, playwright, designer, theater director and screenwriter

حسن باستاني Hassan Bastani
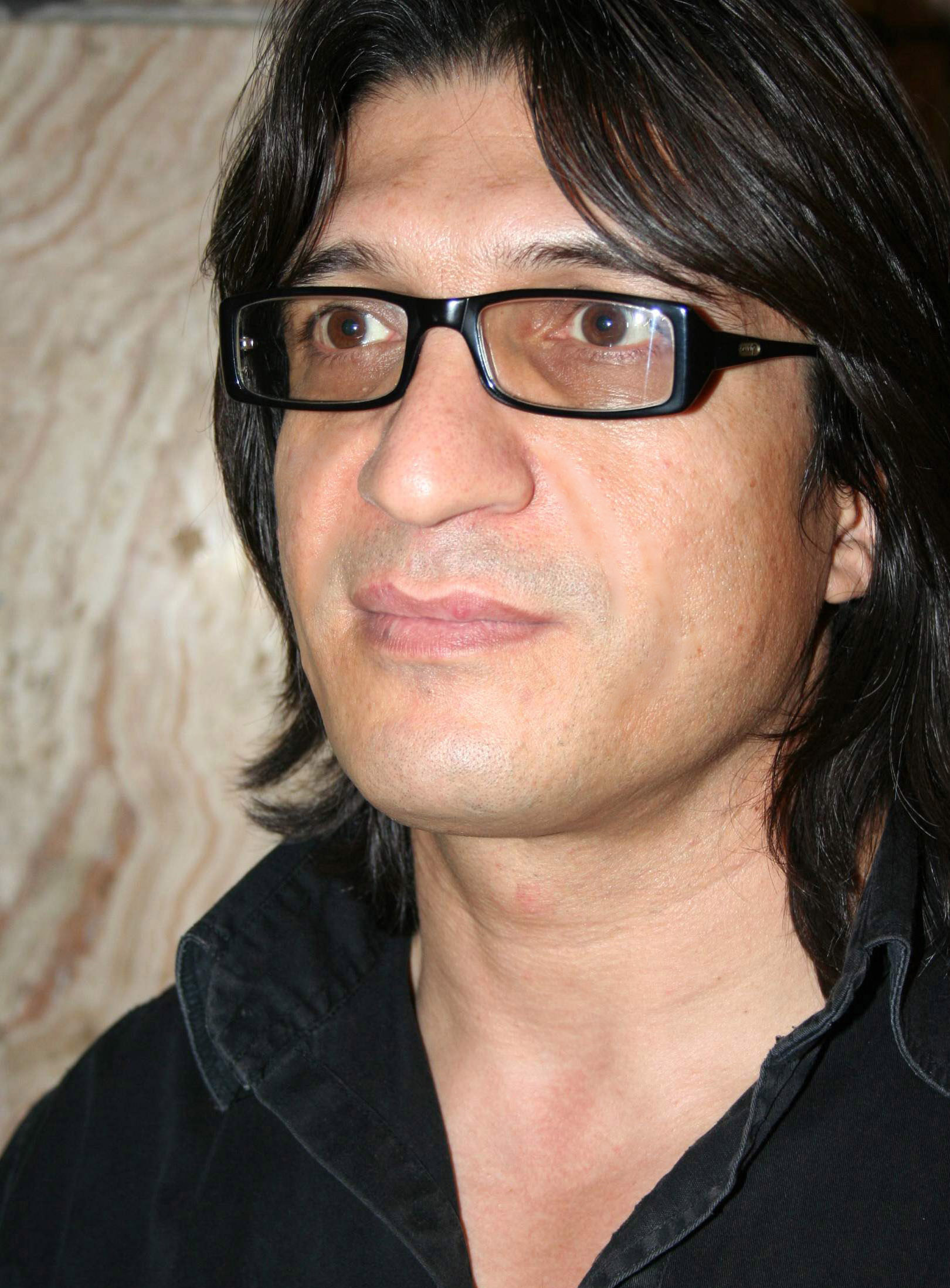
- Born: January 19, 1962; Tehran, Iran
- Occupations: Researcher, playwright, designer, theater director, screenwriter
- Parent(s): Mahpareh, Ghodrat

Hassan Bastani Persian: حسن باستاني; born January 19, 1962) is an Iranian researcher, playwright, designer, theater director and screenwriter.

He started his professional achievement in Playwright and theater direction since 1995 and has written more than 40 and directed 12 plays up to now. Most of his plays were participated in nation and international festivals in Iran and other countries (14 international theater festivals in Iran and 4 ones aboard)He received 29 honored diploma and appreciation tablets from national festivals and 5 honored diploma from international festivals. Also, He had 2 public performances in Georgia (2005) and Colombia (2010).

Hassan Bastani is administrator of "education and research committee" and "board member "of Playwrights and translators association of the Iranian theater forum, also founder and supervisor of Adonai Theater group in 2006. Bastani besides researching on Persian ancient scripture, culture and mythology has involved on playwriting plays with cultural, ancient literary and folkloric theme also antiwar works.

== Education ==
Hassan Bastani entered to School Theater in 1976. Some years later he became a teacher and began his corporation with Deylaman theater group. He staged his first professional directing work at Isfahan University of Technology, in 1989. Also In 1989, he graduated in [Mining Exploration] from, Iran. He passed Superlative Training Courses of Playwriting from Islamic Development Organization in 1991 and Superlative Training Courses of Playwritingand screenwritingby Bahram Beyzaie from Hamid Samandarian Institute in 1995. Now he is studying Theology at Nations University.

== Career ==
=== Theaters and playwrights ===
- The stories of me and you and Jamshidshah and Shahnameh
- The Divel and Miss Prym./ Based on the novel by Paulo Coelho
- Dash Akol
- Sugmehr (Mehr Tragedy)
- Mother of all those Esfandyars
- Landless more than the Wind, Iranshahr Hall, 2013
- Antoine and the little prince, Theatre Shahr or Teatre shahr or Shahr-Theater or Tehran City Theater, 2012
- Jonas and father Jepeto
- General's flasks
- Abbasgholikhan mezghounchi souvenir
- On shore of torpid river
- Killer, Gagig Karapetian, Tehran City Theater, 2011
- Kalkal nameh
- Soldier's day,Sexta Fiesta international theater festival, Medellín, Colombia, Cali teatro, Cali- Colombia, libéré teatro, Bogotá, Colombia, 2010, Tehran City Theater,2011
- Pitook
- The son of man
- Armageddon
- Me and you and Rostam and Shahnameh
- No news in Charsoo, Sangelaj Hall, 2009(تماشاخانه سنگلج)
- The black letter reading
- Kufians(Crowded Of no one)
- Forever lasting, Mehr Hall (2008), Mobarak Hall Bahman Cultural Center, 2008
- Easter, August Strindberg, Tehran City Theater, 2006
- Iran, Theater forum, 2005
- Dragon faced
- Apartment
- Another Pouria, Tehran City Theater, 1997
- Hero
- The Tragedy of Foroud Sivashan
- Fem & Sorrow of Zariran Memorial
- Who is inside me
- Rose smell
- Sat in mud
- Afrah
- The last Second
- Heritage
- Lady Sun
- The Helpless master
- The cold room
- Your God liked this
- Scarecrow
- Green per green, Behrouz Gharibpour, Isfahan University of Technology, 1989
- The last dinner, Isfahan University of Technology,1989

=== television series ===
- Sat in mud tele theater, Directed by Majid Vahedizadeh (مجید واحدی‌زاده)
- European passenger-Akaskhaneh series, Directed by Hassan Nangoli Ahoura حسن نانکلی اهورا.

=== Scenario ===
- Life power 2

=== Radio drama ===
- Iran
- Rose smell

=== Compilation ===
- When a miracle comes to you

=== Paper ===
- ART AND ART SITUATION SINCE PREHISTORY UP TO NOW

== Received awards ==
- Letter of Commendation of UNICEF for supporting its stall at 6th Tehran International Book Fair
- Letter of Commendation of the 6th Course of Selection of top works of Dramatic Literature of Iran, 2012.
- Letter of Commendation of the 5th Course of Selection of top works of Dramatic Literature of Iran, 2011.
- Letter of Commendation of Art and cultural organization of Tehran municipality for the fifth program of Criticizing Mah Theater in Tehran Theater Club Soldier's day, 2011
- Letter of Commendation of Sexta fiesta international festival, Medellín, Colombia for play writing, directing and scene designing of Soldier's day, 2010
- Letter of Commendation of the 6th Annual Feast of World Theatre Day of the Iranian theater forum, 2009
- Letter of Commendation of the 5th Mah nationwide theater festival for Scene design of play Soldier's day, 2008
- Letter of Commendation of the 4th Mah nationwide theater festival for second place of play Forever lasting, 2007
- Honored Diploma and memorial statue of The First Provincial Festival Play writing of Provincial Festival Play writing for the selected playwright of Forever lasting, 2007
- Letter of Commendation of the 4th Annual Feast of World Theatre Day of the Iranian theater forum, 2007
- Letter of Commendation and memorial statue of the 2nd Great Contest of Play writing for Islamic Celebrities of Great Contest of Play writing for Islamic Celebrities for playwright of the prophet daughter-in-law (Landless more than the Wind), Art and cultural organization of Tehran municipality, 2007
- Honored diploma of the 14th Festival of Radio and Television Products of Capital Cities for the best playwright of Sat in mud Isfahan, 2006
- Letter of Commendation of The 2nd millennium pottery festival of Damghan Tappeh Hesar, 2006
- Selected Iranian play Dragon faced for participating at White nights international theater festival, invited from Theater an der Ruhr, Mülheim, Germany, 2005
- Honored diploma of Filling the empty space international theater festival for playwright of Dragon faced, Baku, Azerbaijan Republic, 2005
- Letter of Commendation of the 16th Annual Theater Festival of District 6-"Golestan" Province -"Gorgan", 2005
- Letter of Commendation of The 6th international theater festival of Iranzamin for play Dragon faced, 2004
- Honored diploma of the 12th theater festival of state and the 5th street festival of Ardebil state for first place of playwright of Dragon faced, 2004
- Honored diploma of the 6th Nationwide theater festival of state Qom for first place of playwright of Hero, 2001
- Honored diploma of the 8th Soureh Nationwide theater festival for first place of playwright of Mehr Tragedy, 1999
- Honored tablet of the 17th Fajr International Theater Festival, 1989
- Letter of Commendation of The 4th children of mosque national theater festival for playwright and directing of your lord liked this, 1998
- Letter of Commendation of The 9th International ritual & traditional theater festival, 1997
- Honored diploma of The First Nationwide playlet festival for first place of playwright of Mehr Tragedy, Zahedan 1996
- Honored diploma of the 3rd Nationwide Theater Festival- Atashkar for 3rd place of playwright and second place of direction of Another Pouria, 1996
- Letter of Commendation of the 14th Fajr International Theater Festival, for text third place of Sat in mud, 1996
- Letter of Commendation of the 13th Nationwide Theater Festival of provinces for playwright of Sat in mud, 1995
- Letter of Commendation of the 13th Nationwide Theater Festival of provinces for playwright of Another Pouria, 1995
- Letter of Commendation of the 11th Fajr International Theater Festival, 1992
