= Khomeinism =

Iranian conservative ideology

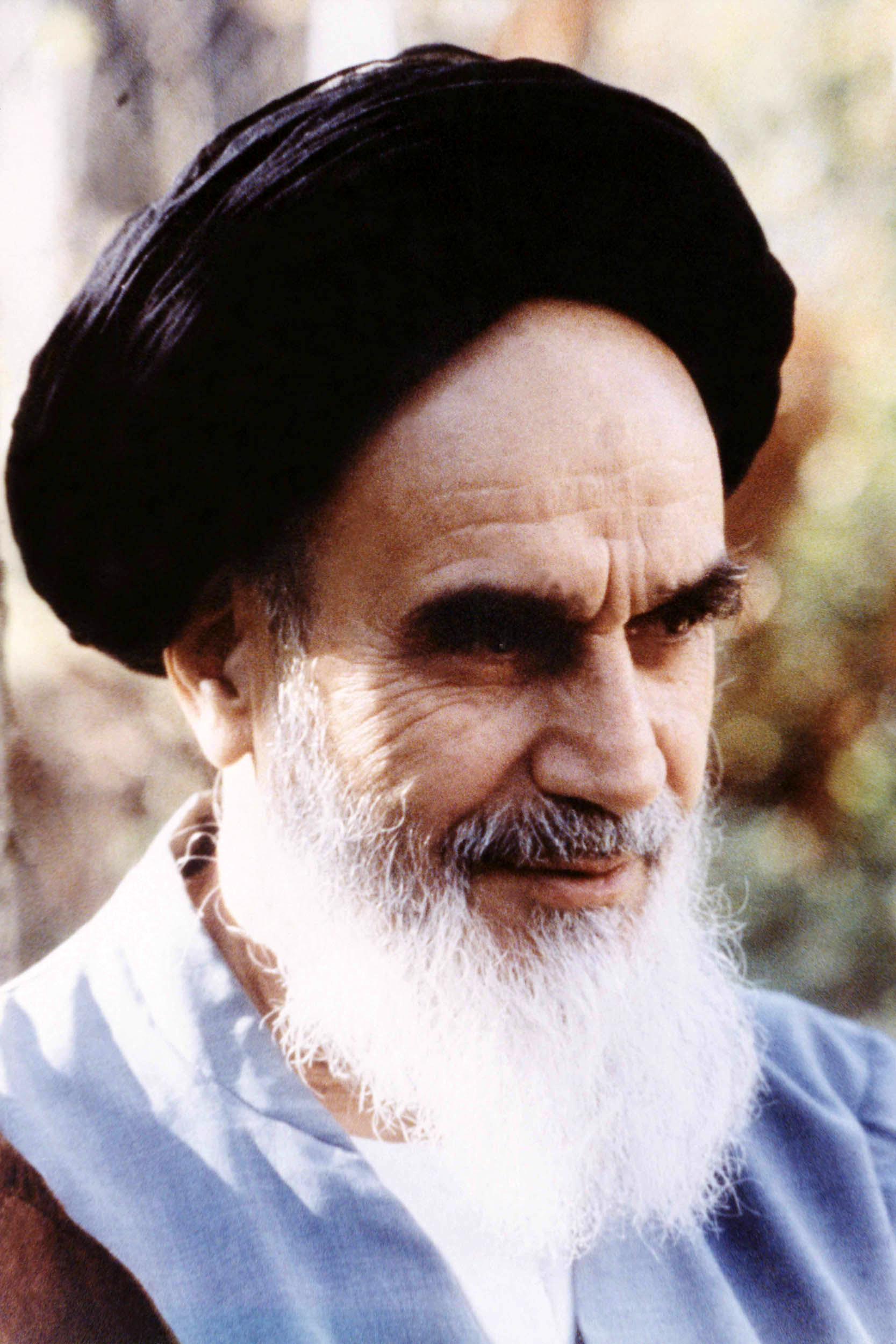
Ruhollah Khomeini, after whom Khomeinism is named

Khomeinism (Note: Persian: خمینیسم, romanized: Khomeynism, pronounced [xomejˈniːsm]) is a form of Shia ideology that refers to the religious and political ideas and practices connected with Ruhollah Khomeini, the first supreme leader of Iran. While primarily referring to the ideas and practices of Khomeini himself, Khomeinism may also refer to the ideology of the clerical class which has ruled the Islamic Republic of Iran founded by Khomeini, following his death, and to the "radicalization" of segments of the Twelver Shia populations of Iran, Iraq, and Lebanon, and to the Iranian government's "recruitment" of Shia minorities in Afghanistan, Pakistan, Saudi Arabia, and Africa. The term Khomeinist may also be used to describe members of Iran's ruling clerics, as opposed to Shia Muslim clerics who do not follow the concept of Wilayat ul-Faqih or other ideas of Khomeini.

Under Khomeini's leadership, Iran replaced its monarchy with a theocratic republic. Khomeini brought about a major paradigm shift in Shia Islam. He declared that Islamic jurists (clerics specializing in Islamic jurisprudence) are the true holders of religious and political authority, who must be obeyed as "an expression of obedience to God", and whose rule has "precedence over all secondary ordinances in Islam such as prayer, fasting, and pilgrimage". Khomeini's doctrines greatly impacted Shia Islam, which had upheld political quietism for over a thousand years. Another significant revision of tradition was on Mahdism, the messianic belief in the reappearance of their Twelfth Imam and the proper way to wait for Him. Traditional Twelver theologians urged believers to wait patiently for his return, but Khomeini and his followers called upon Shia Muslims to actively pave the way for Mahdi's global Islamic rule.

Since his death, politics in the legal sphere of the Islamic Republic of Iran has been "largely defined by attempts to claim Khomeini's legacy", according to at least one scholar, and "staying faithful to his ideology has been the litmus test for all political activity" there. According to Vali Nasr, outside Iran, Khomeini's influence has been found among the large Shia populations of Iraq and Lebanon. In the non-Muslim world, Khomeini had an impact on the West and even Western popular culture where it was said that he became "the virtual face of Islam" who "inculcated fear and distrust towards Islam".

== Background ==
Ayatollah Khomeini was a senior Islamic jurist cleric of Twelver Shi'i Islam (which makes up about 80% of the Shi'i population). Shia theology holds that Wilayah or Islamic leadership (political and religious) belongs to a divinely-appointed line of Shia Imams descended from a cousin (Ali) and daughter (Fatima) of the Islamic prophet Muhammad, the last of which is the 12th Imam, Muhammad al-Mahdi. The God-given (Infallible) knowledge and sense of justice of the Imams makes them the definitive reference for (Shia) Muslims in every aspect of life, religious or otherwise, including governance. However, the twelfth Imam disappeared into what Shia believe is "occultation" (ghaybat) in 939 AD and so has not been present to rule over the Muslim community for over a thousand years.

In the absence of the Imam, Shia scholars/religious leaders accepted the idea of non-theocratic leaders (typically a hereditary monarch such as a sultan, king, or shah) managing political affairs, defending Shia Muslims and their territory, but no consensus emerged among the scholars as to how Muslims should relate to those leaders. Shia jurists have tended to stick to one of three approaches to the state: cooperating with it, becoming active in politics to influence its policies, or most commonly, remaining aloof from it.

For many years of his career Khomeini opted for the second of these three, believing Islam should encompass all aspects of life, especially the state, and disapproving of the political developments in his country – Iran's weak Qajar dynasty (1789–1925), the Western concepts and language borrowed in the 1906 constitution, and especially the aggressively secularist and modernizing Pahlavi dynasty (1925–1979). Precedents for this approach included the theory of "co-working with the just sultan" put forward by Sayyed Murtaza during the Buyid era (934-1062 CE) in his work Al-Resala Al-Amal Ma'a Sultan about 1000 years ago, an idea that was developed further by Nasir al-Din al-Tusi (1201 – 1274 CE). Clerical political influence was institutionalized during the Safavid Empire about 500 years ago. In modern times the Grand Ayatollah Mirza Shirazi intervened against Nasir al-Din Shah when in 1890 that Qajar monarch gave a 50-year monopoly over the distribution and exportation of tobacco to a foreign non-Muslim. Shirazi issued the famous fatwa against the usage of tobacco as part of the Tobacco Protest.

In 1970, Khomeini broke from this tradition, developing a fourth approach to the state, a revolutionary change in Shia Islam proclaiming that monarchy was inherently unjust, and that religious legal scholars should not just become involved in politics but rule. During this phase, the Egyptian Jihadist ideologue Sayyid Qutb was an important influence on Khomeini and the 1979 Iranian Revolution.

=== Origin of the term ===
"Khomeinism" was perhaps first used (Note: "Khomeini’s Islamist, populist agenda – dubbed 'Khomeinism' by scholar Ervand Abrahamian – has radicalized and guided Shiite Islamists both inside and outside Iran.") as the title of a book by Ervand Abrahamian (Khomeinism: Essays on the Islamic Republic, 1993), where Abrahamian argued that it was more useful to think of Khomeini as a populist in the same vein as South American caudillos, than as the fundamentalist or traditionalist he was often described as in the West. It is also the title of an unsympathetic report on Khomeini's ideology from a group called United Against Nuclear Iran (UANI), emphasising Khomeini's controversial interpretation of Shi'ism, his rejection of Western interference and influence in the Muslim world, authoritarian rule in Iran, his successors' support for allied militias in Lebanon, Iraq, etc. and is used in the title of a chapter by Mojtaba Mahdavi in a 2014 book A Critical Introduction to Khomeini, (Cambridge University Press), which describes "five distinct stages" in the evolution of Khomeini's thought "beginning with political quietism and concluding with political absolutism". (Note: Khomeini as the quietist (1920s–1940s); the constitutionalist (1940s–1971); the revolutionary (1971–1979); the vali-ye faqih (1979–1987); and the absolute vali-ye faqih (1987–1989)) The title of a PhD. thesis by Mohammad Rezaie Yazdi (Khomeinism, the Islamic Revolution and Anti Americanism), where Yazdi "attempts to show how the Ayatullah" emphasized a clash between the United States and "Iranian national freedom and religious pride"

== Tenets ==
At least one scholar (Ervand Abrahamian) has argued that Khomeini's "decrees, sermons, interviews, and political pronouncements" have outlasted his theological works because it is the former and not the latter that the Islamic Republic of Iran "constantly reprints." Without the decrees, sermons, interviews, and political pronouncements "there would have been no Khomeinism [ideology]. Without Khomeinism there would have been no revolution. And without the Islamic Revolution, Khomeini would have been no more than a footnote to Iranian history."

=== Improvisational ability ===
Outside of his doctrinal beliefs, Khomeini has also been noted for being a "brilliant tactician," with a great "ability to improvise." Elaine Sciolino writes:

Khomeini once protested the shah's enfranchisement of women, and then encouraged women to participate in his revolution and vote for his government when he needed their numbers. He once promised that clerics would hold only temporary positions in government and then allowed them to hold the most senior positions. He pledged to continue the war against Iraq until its defeat and then abruptly made peace. He once said that the fact that "I have said something does not mean that I should be bound by my word." Indeed, it is that suppleness, that ability to improvise that has outlived Khomeini and that continues to pervade the Islamic Republic, keeping it going.

At least one scholar (Daniel Brumberg) has argued that Khomeini's ability to swing from one "religiopolitical...perspective to another" has been exploited by followers to advance their various and competing agendas. In particular reformists such as Muhammad Khatami in search of more democracy and less theocracy. Another (Abrahamian) argues that Khomeini's "ideological adaptability" belie the "label of fundamentalist" applied to him in both the West and in Iran.

=== Governance ===
==== Rulers ====
As to how jurists should influence governance, Ayatollah Khomeini's leadership changed direction over time as his views on governance evolved. On who should rule and what should be the ultimate authority in governance:

- Khomeini originally accepted traditional Shia political theory, writing in "Kashf-e Asrar" that, "We do not say that government must be in the hands of" an Islamic jurist, "rather we say that government must be run in accordance with God's law ... " suggesting a parliament of Shi'a jurists could choose a just king. ( امام خمينى، كشف الاسرار: ۱۸۷ – ص ۱۸۵)
- Later he told his followers that "Islam proclaims monarchy and hereditary succession wrong and invalid." Only rule by a leading Islamic jurist (velayat-e faqih) would prevent "innovation" in Sharia or Islamic law and ensure it was properly followed. The need for this governance of the faqih was "necessary and self-evident" to good Muslims.
- Once in power and recognizing the need for more flexibility, he finally insisted the ruling jurist need not be one of the most learned, that Sharia rule was subordinate to interests of Islam (Maslaha – `expedient interests` or `public welfare`), and the "divine government" as interpreted by the ruling jurists, who could overrule Sharia if necessary to serve those interests. The Islamic "government, which is a branch of the absolute governance of the Prophet of God, is among the primary ordinances of Islam, and has precedence over all secondary ordinances such as prayer (salat), fasting (sawm), and pilgrimage (hajj)."

==== Lack of detail on governing ====
While Khomeini was keenly focused on the Islamic scholars’ right to rule and the state's "moral and ideological foundation", he did not dwell on the state's actually functioning or the "particulars" of its management. According to some scholars (Gheissari and Nasr) Khomeini never "put forward a systematic definition of the Islamic state and Islamic economics;... never described its machinery of government, instruments of control, social function, economic processes, or guiding values and principles." In his plan for Islamic Government by Islamic Jurists he wrote: "The entire system of government and administration, together with necessary laws, lies ready for you. If the administration of the country calls for taxes, Islam has made the necessary provision; and if laws are needed, Islam has established them all... Everything is ready and waiting. All that remains is to draw up ministerial programs ..."

==== Power of modern government ====
Scholar Shadi Hamid argues that an important feature of Khomeinism was the combining of conservative Islamic teachings not with iron-age horse powered technology, but with power of the modern state "in all of its sprawling, overbearing glory", something unique in Islamic history.

Until the 20th century, states simply could not be authoritarian in the fullest sense of the word. Their bureaucratic, technological, and surveillance capacity was limited. Even under despots, ordinary people could still live relatively free lives because the state could only extend its tentacles of control so far. The introduction of the nation-state removed any such constraints. Leaders could seek dominion not just over government but over society, too. Not only did they want to change your behavior; they wanted to transform the way you perceived the world.

=== Sharia (Islamic law) ===
In his manifest Islamic Government, Khomeini emphasized the wonder and preciousness of sharia, divine law.

God, Exalted and Almighty, by means of the Most Noble Messenger (peace and blessing be upon him), sent laws that astound us with their magnitude. He instituted laws and practices for all human affairs ... There is not a single topic in human life for which Islam has not provided instruction and established a norm. [But] ... foreign agents have constantly insinuated that Islam has nothing to offer, that Islam consists of a few ordinances concerning menstruation and parturition ...

and how being divine, no human should ever attempt to change it.

... in Islam the legislative power and competence to establish laws belongs exclusively to God Almighty. ... No one has the right to legislate and no law may be executed except the law of the Divine Legislator ... The law of Islam, divine command, has absolute authority over all individuals and the Islamic government.`

However, at least one scholar notes a number of ways that Khomeini made sharia (or at least the sharia of Usuli Shi'ism) "subordinate to the revolution".

- traditionally the fatwa pronounced by a grand ayatollah ceased to be in effect when the ayatollah died. Khomeini affirmed fatwa, such as his fatwa calling for the killing of Salman Rushdie, could remain valid.
- Khomeini defrocked a grand ayatollah (Mohammad Kazem Shariatmadari) and "promoted clerics as a function of their political allegiance and not their religious rank".

=== Mahdism ===
Khomeini's insistence on a religious state governed by select members of Shia clergy was closely linked to his reformulation of Twelver Shi'ite messianic beliefs on Mahdism. Traditional Twelver Shi'ite belief held that, during the occultation of the twelfth Imam when injustice reigned, Muslims should remain aloof from the corruption of politics and wait patiently for the re-emergence of al-Mahdi, the Twelfth Imam. Fundamentally countermanding this tenet, Khomeini asserted that Shias must "prepare for Mahdi’s global revolution" by establishing a religious state. Such a government would be headed by an oligarchy of Shiite clerics, who would rule (Khomeini believed) on behalf of the 12th Imam. This millenarian belief became the core rationale behind the system of Velayat-e-Faqih (guardianship of the jurist).

Khomeini's ideas on Mahdism would be further developed after his death; most notably by his successor Ali Khamenei and the principalist cleric Mohammad-Taqi Mesbah-Yazdi. Yazdi called for cultivating a generation based on Mahdist ideology and values. Building on Khomeni's ideas, Ali Khamenei demarcated five stages as part of the millenarian framework: "an Islamic Revolution, an Islamic regime, an Islamic government, an Islamic society, and an Islamic civilization." The doctrine of Mahdism is taught in Islamist seminaries and it is also a core ideological hallmark of the Basij and the IRGC institutions. Since the emergence of the 2009 Green movement, a "cult of Mahdism" has been heavily promoted by the IRGC and state-backed clergy in an attempt to deter the youth from embracing secular ideas; and it is strongly tied to the inner circle of Ali Khamenei. Mohammadi Golpayegani, chief staff of the Office of Supreme Leader backed the 2022 Russian invasion of Ukraine, claiming that it was a “prelude to the reappearance" of 12th Imam.

=== Conspiracy theories ===
Throughout his political career Khomeini expressed a belief in the existence of plots and conspiracies fomented by foreigners and their Iranian agents against Islam and Muslims. Abrahamian argues that this belief, shared among adherents of most political persuasions in Iran to varying degrees, can be explained by the domination of Iran's politics by foreign powers for the past 200 years until the Islamic revolution, first by Russia and Britain, later by the United States. Foreign influence was involved in all of Iran's three military coups: 1908 (Russian), 1921 (UK) and 1953 (UK and US).

One of the reasons Khomeini gave in his 1970 lecture series for why theocratic rule of humanity by Islamic jurists was essential, was that (he believed) it was the only form of government that would protect the Muslim world from the conspiracies of colonialists, who were responsible for,

the decline of Muslim civilization, the conservative `distortions` of Islam, and the divisions between nation-states, between Sunnis and Shiis, and between oppressors and oppressed. He argued that the colonial powers had for years sent Orientalists into the East to misinterpret Islam and the Koran and that the colonial powers had conspired to undermine Islam both with religious quietism and with secular ideologies, especially socialism, liberalism, monarchism, and nationalism.

He claimed that Britain had instigated the 1905 Constitutional Revolution to subvert Islam: "The Iranians who drafted the constitutional laws were receiving instructions directly from their British masters."

In the contemporary world, Khomeini held Western colonial conspiracies responsible for keeping the country poor and backward, exploiting its resources, inflamed class antagonism, dividing the clergy and alienating them from the masses, causing mischief among the tribes, infiltrating the universities, cultivating consumer instincts, and encouraging moral corruption, especially gambling, prostitution, drug addiction, and alcohol consumption.

At least one scholar (Abrahamian) sees "far-reaching" consequences in the belief in ever-present conspiracies. If conspiracy dominates political action then

"those with views different from one's own were members of this or that foreign conspiracy. Thus political activists tended to equate competition with treason, ... One does not compromise and negotiate with spies and traitors; one locks them up or else shoots them. ... The result was detrimental for the development of political pluralism in Iran. ... Differences of opinion within organizations could not be accommodated; it was all too easy for leaders to expel dissidents as 'foreign agents'.

Abrahamian believes that what he calls this "paranoid style" paved the way for the mass executions of 1981–82, where "never before in Iran had firing squads executed so many in so short a time over so flimsy an accusation."

=== Populism ===
Another way Khomeini's views changed direction over time was concerning political populism and relations between social classes. Before 1970, Khomeini had had the conventional traditional "paternalistic" religious views on class. Since "God had created both private property and society, society should be formed of a hierarchy of mutually dependent strata (qeshreha)." The poor should not be envious of the rich, and the rich should be grateful to God, avoid any displays of wealth and make generous charitable contributions to the poor. This changed markedly after 1970 when his political movement began to gain momentum. In his writings,

Khomeini depicted society as sharply divided into two warring classes (tabaqat): the mostazafin (oppressed) against the mostakberin (oppressors); the foqara (poor) against the sarvatmandan (rich); the mellat-e mostazaf (oppressed nation) against hokumat-e shaytan (Satan's government); the zagheh-neshinha (slum dwellers) against the kakh-neshinha (palace dweller); the tabaqeh-e payin (lower class) against the tabaqeh-e bala (upper class); and tabaqeh-e mostamdan (needy class) against the tabaqeh-e a'yan (aristocratic class). In the past, such imagery would have been used by secular leftists rather than by clerical leaders."

Ervand Abrahamian argues that, while these and other points demonstrate Khomeini "came to power by openly exploiting class antagonisms", at the same time "careful scrutiny" of his writing during this time show him to have been "remarkably vague" on the specifics of how he planned to help the poor – "especially on the question of private property".

In this way, Abrahamian argues, Khomeini's "ideas, and his movement" despite being Islamic, bear a striking resemblance to populist movements in other countries – particularly those of South America such as Juan Perón and Getúlio Vargas. Like them, Khomeini led a "radical but pragmatic" protest movement "against the established order". The movement was not of the working class and poor, but of the "propertied middle class". "The lower classes, especially the urban poor" were not so much served by his movement as mobilized by Khomeini. These movements attacked "the upper class and foreign powers," but not property rights. They preached "a return to `native roots` and eradication of `cosmopolitan ideas.` It claimed "a noncapitalist, noncommunist `third way` towards development," but was intellectually "flexible", emphasizing "cultural, national, and political reconstruction," not economic and social revolution."

Like those movements it celebrated the oppressed poor and gave them a label – mostazafin by Khomeini, descamisados (coatless ones) by Peron, trabalhadores by Vargas. But the actual power flowed from its leader, who was "elevated ... into a demigod towering above the people and embodying their historical roots, future destiny, and revolutionary martyrs."

=== Democracy ===
Whether Khomeini's ideas are compatible with democracy and whether he intended the Islamic Republic to be democratic is disputed, with both supporters and opponents on each side of the issue. Notable Iranians who believe he did not, include Mohammad Taghi Mesbah Yazdi (a senior cleric and main theorist of Iranian ultraconservatives who opposes democracy), Akbar Ganji (a pro-democracy activist and writer who is against the Islamic government) and Abdolkarim Soroush (an anti-regime Iranian philosopher in exile), according to Reza Parsa writing in the state-run Aftab News. Other followers of Khomeini who maintain he did support democracy and that the Islamic Republic is democratic include Ali Khamenei, Mohammad Khatami and Morteza Motahhari.

Khomeini preached to his followers about theocratic rule by jurists, but not to the public. He made statements before the revolution indicating support for "democracy", but opposition to it once in power. During a pre-revolutionary meeting with Karin Samjabi in Paris in November 1978, he stated that the future government of Iran would be 'democratic and Islamic`. but after he had returned to Iran and the Shah's government had collapsed, told a huge crowd of Iranians, "Do not use this term, `democratic.` That is the Western style,`"

One explanation for this change of position is that Khomeini needed the support of the pro-democracy educated middle class to take power. Another is that Khomeini used another definition of "democracy" than "Western parliamentary" or representative democracy (Shaul Bakhash). According to scholar Bakhash, Khomeini believed that the huge turnout of Iranians in anti-Shah demonstrations during the revolution meant that Iranians had already voted in a `referendum` for an Islamic republic. Khomeini wrote that in Muslim countries, Islam and Islamic law,

truly belong to the people. In contrast, in a republic or a constitutional monarchy, most of those claiming to be representatives of the majority of the people will approve anything they wish as law and then impose it on the entire population.

In drawing up the constitution of his Islamic Republic, he and his supporters agreed to include Western-democratic elements, such as an elected parliament and president, but some argue he believed Islamic elements, not Western-style elected parliaments and presidents, should prevail in government. After the ratifying of the Islamic constitution he told an interviewer that the constitution in no way contradicted democracy because the `people love the clergy, have faith in the clergy, and want to be guided by the clergy` and that it was right that Supreme Leader oversee the work of the non-clerical officials `to make sure they don't make mistakes or go against the law and the Quran.'

As the revolution was consolidated, terms like "democracy" and "liberalism" – considered praiseworthy in the West – became words of criticism, while "revolution" and "revolutionary" were terms of praise.

According to Khomeini, proponents of "democracy" and even "Islamic democracy" are misguided. He stated in a 1980 interview:

"But as for ‘democratic,’ we won’t accept it even if you put it next to ‘Islamic.’ Even apart from this, as I said in an earlier talk, to juxtapose “democratic” and “Islamic” is an insult to Islam. Because when you place the word “democratic” in front of “Islamic,” it means that Islam is lacking in the alleged virtues of democracy, although Islam is, in fact, superior to all forms of democracy. To speak of a “democratic Islamic republic” is like speaking of a “justice-oriented Islamic republic.” That is an insult to Islam because it suggests that justice is something extrinsic to Islam, whereas it is the very substance of Islam.

Still another scholar, non-Iranian Daniel Brumberg, argues that Khomeini's statements on politics were simply not "straightforward, coherent, or consistent," and that in particular he contradicted his writings and statements on the primacy of the rule of the jurist with repeated statements on the importance of the leading role of the parliament, such as `the Majlis heads all affairs`, and `the majlis is higher than all the positions which exist in the country.` This, according to Brumberg, has created a legacy where his followers "exploited these competing notions of authority" to advance "various agendas of their own." Reformist seizing on his statements about the importance of majlis, and theocrats on those of rule by the clergy.

=== Third World ===
According to at least one observer (Olivier Roy), from the overthrow of the shah until the death of Khomeini in 1989,

sympathy for the third world was a constant ... The Iranian press during [this period] devoted extensive coverage to non-Muslim revolutionary movements (from the Sandinistas to the African National Congress and the Irish Republican Army) and downplayed the role of Islamic movements considered conservative such as the Afghan mujahideen. During this period third world solidarity took precedence over Muslim fraternity in an utter departure from all other Islamic movements.

=== Human rights ===
Khomeini believed it was essential that Muslims (and eventually everyone) be governed by Islamic law/Sharia. Khomeini ruled "that the penalty for conversion from Islam, or apostasy, is death."

After the creation of the Islamic Republic of Iran, thousands of people were executed in public, including homosexuals. On 12 September 1979, Oriana Fallaci, Italian journalist, interviewed Khomeini, asking him if it was right to shoot homosexuals. He responded that some societies "where men are permitted to give themselves to satisfy other men's desires", and that "the society that we want to build does not permit such things." When she responded about the "boy they shot yesterday, for sodomy.", he responded "Corruption, corruption. We have to eliminate corruption."

Before taking power, Khomeini expressed support for the Universal Declaration of Human Rights. "We would like to act according to the Universal Declaration of Human Rights. We would like to be free. We would like independence," he stated. However, once in power, Khomeini took a firm line against dissent, warning opponents of theocracy for example: "I repeat for the last time: abstain from holding meetings, from blathering, from publishing protests. Otherwise I will break your teeth." Khomeini believed that, since Islamic government was essential for Islam, what threatened the government threatened Islam.

Since God Almighty has commanded us to follow the Messenger and the holders of authority, our obeying them is actually an expression of obedience to God.

Iran adopted an alternative human rights declaration, the Cairo Declaration on Human Rights in Islam, in 1990 (one year after Khomeini's death), which differs from the Universal Declaration of Human Rights, requiring law to be in accordance with Sharia, denying complete equality with men for women, and forbidding speech that violates the "dignity of Prophets", or "undermines moral and ethical values."

One observer, Iranian political historian Ervand Abrahamian, believes that some of the more well-known violations of international human rights initiated by Khomeini – the fatwa to kill British-citizen author Salman Rushdie and the mass executions of leftist political prisoners in 1988 – can be explained best as a legacy for his followers. Abrahamian argues Khomeini wanted to "forge unity" among "his disparate followers, [and] raise formidable – if not insurmountable – obstacles in the way of any future leader hoping to initiate a detente with the West," and most importantly to "weed out the half-hearted from the true believers", such as heir-designate Ayatollah Hussein-Ali Montazeri, who protested the killings and was dismissed from his position.

According to Zahra Eshraghi, granddaughter of Ayatollah Khomeini,

"Discrimination here [in Iran] is not just in the constitution. As a woman, if I want to get a passport to leave the country, have surgery, even to breathe almost, I must have permission from my husband."

=== Economics ===
In the realm of economics, Khomeini was known both for his lack of interest and conflicting views on the subject.

He famously replied to a question before the revolution about how the Islamic Republic would manage Iran's economy by saying economics was "for donkeys" (also translated as "for fools"), and expressed impatience with those who complained about the inflation and shortages following the revolution saying: "I cannot believe that the purpose of all these sacrifices was to have less expensive melons." His lack of attention has been described as "possibly one factor explaining the inchoate performance of the Iranian economy since the 1979 revolution," (along with the mismanagement by clerics trained in Islamic law but not economic science).

Khomeini has also been described as being "quite genuinely of two minds", and of having "ambiguous and contradictory attitudes" on the role of the state in the economy. He agreed with conservative clerics and the bazaar (traditional merchant class) on the importance of strict sharia law and respect for the sanctity of private property, but also made populist promises such as free water and electricity and government-provided homes for the poor, which could only be provided, if at all, by massive government intervention in the economy in violation of traditional Shariah law. While Khomeini was alive, these conflicting attitudes were represented in the clash between the populists of the Parliament and the conservatives of the Guardian Council.

After his death until 1997, the "bazaari side" of the legacy predominated with the regime of President Akbar Hashemi Rafsanjani. Rafsanjani and Supreme Leader Ali Khamenei, emphasized `reconstruction,` `realism,` `work discipline,` `managerial skills,` `modern technology,` `expertise and competence,` `individual self-reliance,` `entrepreneurship,` and `stability.`"

The populist side of Khomeini's economic legacy is said to be found in President Mahmoud Ahmadinejad, who allegedly "mirrored" Khomeini's disdain for the "donkey" science of economics, wearing "his contempt for economic orthodoxy as a badge of honour", and overseeing sluggish growth and rising inflation and unemployment under his administration.

Khomeini strongly opposed Marxism. `Atheistic Marxists` were the one group he excluded from the broad coalition of anti-Shah groups he worked to rally behind his leadership. In his last will and testament, he urged future generations to respect property on the grounds that free enterprise turns the `wheels of the economy` and prosperity would produce `social justice` for all, including the poor.

Islam differs sharply from communism. Whereas we respect private property, communism advocates the sharing of all things – including wives and homosexuals.

What one scholar (Ervand Abrahamian) called the populist thrust of Khomeini can be found in the fact that after the revolution, revolutionary tribunals expropriated "agribusinesses, large factories, and luxury homes belonging to the former elite," but were careful to avoid "challenging the concept of private property."

On the other hand, Khomeini's revolutionary movement was influenced by Islamic leftist and thinker Ali Shariati, and the leftist currents of the 1960s and 1970s. Khomeini proclaimed Islam on the side of the mustazafin and against exploiters and imperialists. In part for this reason, a large section of Iran's economy was nationalized during the revolution. At least as of 2003, Iran's public sector and government workforce remains very large. Despite complaints by free marketeers, "about 60% of the economy is directly controlled and centrally planned by the state, and another 10–20% is in the hands of five semi-governmental foundations, who control much of the non-oil economy and are accountable to no one except the supreme leader."

=== Women in politics ===
In October 1962 when the shah introduced a plan to (among other things) let women vote for the first time, Khomeini (and other religious people) were enraged: `The son of Reza Khan has embarked on the destruction of Islam in Iran. I will oppose this as long as the blood circulates in my veins.`" Religious Muslims fought the bill and the shah backed down. Historian Ervand Abrahamian also states that Khomeini had argued "for years" that women's suffrage was "unIslamic."

Before the Revolution, Khomeini opposed allowing women to serve in parliament, likening it to prostitution.

We are against this prostitution. We object to such wrongdoings ... Is progress achieved by sending women to the majlis? Sending women to these centers is nothing but corruption.

However, in the late 1970s, before the Revolution, Khomeini changed his stance:

In an Islamic order, women enjoy the same rights as men – rights to education, work, ownership, to vote in elections and to be voted in. Women are free, just like men to decide their own destinies and activities.

=== Religious philosophy, fiqh, teachings ===
Khomeini made a number of changes to Shia clerical system. Along with his January 1989 ruling that sharia was subordinate to the revolution, he affirmed against tradition that the fatwa pronounced by a grand ayatollah survived that ayatollah (such as the fatwa to kill Salman Rushdie), and defrocked Ayatollah Mohammad Kazem Shariatmadari, a political opponent.

==== Fiqh ====
In Fiqh, (Islamic jurisprudence) some scholars have argued Khomeini championed innovative reinterpretations of doctrine, prompted by the challenges of managing a country of 50 million plus.

- Use of Maslaha, or maslahat (`expedient interests` or `public welfare`). This was a common concept among Sunni, but "before the 1979 revolution most" Shi'ite jurists had "rejected maslahat as a dangerous innovation (bid‘ah)."
- Wider use of "secondary ordinances". Clerics had traditionally argued that the government could issue these "when addressing a narrow range of contractual issues not directly addressed in the Qur'an." Khomeini called for their use to deal with the deadlock between the Majles and the Council of Guardians
- Ijtihad

==== Esmat ====
Esmat is perfection through faith. Khomeini believed not only that truly just and divine Islamic government need not wait for the return of the 12th Imam/Mahdi, but that "divinely bestowed freedom from error and sin" (esmat) was not the exclusive property of the prophets and imams. Esmat required "nothing other than perfect faith" and could be achieved by a Muslim who reaches that state. Hamid Dabashi argues Khomeini's theory of Esmat from faith helped "to secure the all-important attribute of infallibility for himself as a member of the awlia' [friend of God] by eliminating the simultaneous theological and Imamological problems of violating the immanent expectation of the Mahdi." Thus, by "securing" this "attribute of infallibility for himself", Khomeini reassured Shia Muslims who might otherwise be hesitant about granting him the same ruling authority due the 12 Imams. no

==== The Prophets ====
Khomeini believed the Islamic prophets have not yet achieved their "purpose". In November 1985, he told radio listeners, "I should say that so far the purpose of the Prophets has seldom been realized. Very little." Aware of the controversial nature of the statement he warned more conservative clerics that "tomorrow court mullahs . . . [should] not say that Khomeini said that the Prophet is incapable of achieving his aims." He also controversially stated that Fatimah, the daughter of Muhammad, was superior in status to the prophets of God.

Khomeini's authority and charismatic personality prevented less popular jurists from protesting these changes as un-Islamic bid‘ah.

=== Istishhad ===
Perhaps the most significant legacy of Khomeini internationally is a broader definition of martyrdom to include Istishhad, or "self-martyrdom". Khomeini believed martyrdom could come not only from "inadvertent" death but "deliberate" as well. While martyrdom has always been celebrated in Islam and martyrs promised a place in heaven, (Q3:169–71) the idea that opportunities for martyrdom were important has not always been so common. Writing in 2006, Vali Nasr states that "until fairly recently" willingness to die for the cause" (with suicide bombing or other means) was seen as a "predominantly Shia phenomenon, tied to the myths of Karbala and the Twelfth Imam", though it has since spread to Sunni Islam.

==== Iran–Iraq War ====
Khomeini not only praised the large numbers of young Shia Iranians who became "shahids" during the Iran–Iraq War but asserted the war was "God's hidden gift", or as one scholar of Khomeini put it, "a vital outlet through which Iran's young martyrs experienced mystical transcendence." Khomeini explained:

"If the great martyr (Imam Husayn ibn Ali) ... confined himself to praying ... the great tragedy of Kabala would not have come about ... Among the contemporary ulema, if the great Ayatollah ... Shirazi ... thought like these people [who do not fight for Islam], a war would not have taken place in Iraq ... all those Muslims would not have been martyred."

Death might seem like a tragedy to some but in reality...

If you have any tie or link binding you to this world in love, try to sever it. This world, despite all its apparent splendor and charm, is too worthless to be loved

Khomeini never wavered from his faith in the war as God's will, and observers have related a number of examples of his impatience with those who tried to convince him to stop it. When the war seemed to become a stalemate with hundreds of thousands killed and civilian areas being attacked by missiles, Khomeini was approached by Ayatollah Mehdi Haeri Yazdi, a grand ayatollah and former student with family ties to Khomeini. He pleaded with Khomeini to find a way to stop the killing, saying, "it is not right for Muslims to kill Muslims." Khomeini answered reproachfully, asking him, "Do you also criticize God when he sends an earthquake?" On another occasion Khomeini showed his disdain for a delegation of Muslim heads of state who had come to Tehran to offer to mediate an end to the war by keeping them waiting for two hours, and speaking to them for only ten minutes without providing a translator before getting up and leaving.

Vali Nasr writes that necessity may have been a motivator for use of martyrdom by "hundreds of thousands of volunteers" at least early on in the war when many of the "most seasoned officers" in Iran's military had been purged and the hostage crisis "left Iran internationally isolated" and "conventional means of repelling the Iraqi invasion were hard to come by."

==== Lebanon, Palestine, Iraq ====
While istishhad suicide attacks did not win the Iran–Iraq War for Iran, suicide bombings did spread to Lebanon, where observers agree they won victories for the Lebanese branch of the Islamic Da'wa Party, Shia 'allies' of the Islamic Revolution. The 1983 bombings against U.S. and French peacekeeping troops by Hizballah killed over 300 and drove the US and French from Lebanon. Another longer bombing campaign did likewise to the Israeli army. Khomeini is credited, by some, with inspiring these "suicide bombers".

The power of suicide operations as a military tactic has been described by Shia Lebanese as an equalizer where faith and piety are used to counter the superior military power of the Western unbeliever:

You look at it with a Western mentality. You regard it as barbaric and unjustified. We, on the other hand, see it as another means of war, but one which is also harmonious with our religion and beliefs. Take for example, an Israeli warplane or, better still, the American and British air power in the Gulf War. .... The goal of their mission and the outcome of their deeds was to kill and damage enemy positions just like us ... The only difference is that they had at their disposal state-of-the-art and top-of-the-range means and weaponry to achieve their aims. We have the minimum basics ... We ... do not seek material rewards, but heavenly one in the hereafter.

The victory of Hezbollah is known to have inspired the Sunni groups Hamas in Palestine, and al-Qaeda in its worldwide bombing campaign. In the years after Khomeini's death, "Martyrdom operations" or "suicide bombing" spread beyond Shia Islam and beyond attacks on military and are now a major force in the Muslim world. According to one estimate, as of early 2008, 1,121 Muslim suicide bombers have blown themselves up in Iraq alone.

Ironically and tragically, by the early twenty first century, thousands of Muslims, particularly Shia, have become victims, not just initiators, of martyrdom operations. In the Iraq civil war, Salafi Jihadi ideologue Abu Musab Al-Zarqawi declared "all-out war" on Shia Muslims in Iraq in 2005 in response to a US-Iraqi offensive on the town of Tal Afar. Sunni suicide bombers targeted not only thousands of civilians, but mosques, shrines, wedding and funeral processions, markets, hospitals, offices, and streets.

From at least 2003 to 2006 attacks were "mostly" by Sunnis against Shia, and "by 2007 some of the Shia ulema have responded by declaring suicide bombing haram:

'حتي كساني كه با انتحار مي‌آيند و مي‌زنند عده‌اي را مي‌كشند، آن هم به عنوان عمليات انتحاري، اينها در قعر جهنم هستند'
'Even those who kill people with suicide bombing, these shall meet the flames of hell.'"

=== Shia rituals ===
Khomeini showed little interest in the rituals of Shia Islam such as the Day of Ashura. Unlike earlier Iranian shahs or the Awadh's nawabs, he never presided over any Ashura observances, nor visited the enormously popular shrine of the eighth Imam in Mashad. This discouraging of popular Shia piety and Shia traditions by Khomeini and his core supporters has been explained by at least one observer as a product of their belief that Islam was first and foremost about obedience to Islamic law, and that the revolution itself was of "equal significance" to Battle of Karbala where the Imam Husayn was martyred.

This legacy is reflected in the disdain for Shia shrines in other countries shown by Iranian officials, such as Faezeh Rafsanjani, when visiting Pakistan and other countries, and the surprise sometimes shown by their Shia hosts; and perhaps also in President Mahmoud Ahmadinejad's May 2005 statement that "the Iranian revolution was of the same `essence` as Imam Husayn's movement."

=== Mystique ===
Khomeini was celebrated in foreign and domestically-targeted Iranian publications, and some compared his treatment to the personality cults of such figures as Joseph Stalin, Mao Zedong and Fidel Castro. However, his followers went beyond creating a personality cult to transforming Khomeini into what biographer Baqer Moin called, "a semi-divine figure".

In late November 1978, when millions of Iranians were waiting impatiently for Khomeini's return from exile, a rumor swept the land that his face could be seen in the moon. Many gathered excitedly on rooftops and the power of the belief was so "intense and the claim so unwaveringly firm that those who 'could not see' said otherwise". (Note: i.e. those who failed to see Khomeini in the moon were discouraged from admitting such knowing “the neighbors say that only those with pure heart and strong belief may see him,” according to Shahla Talebi, (creating an Emperor's New Clothes effect).)

Vali Nasr writes of "the messianic symbols and language" used Khomeini's network/followers to "give him an aura of power". Khomeini was the first and only Iranian cleric to be addressed as "Imam", a title hitherto reserved in Iran for the twelve infallible leaders of the early Shi'a. He was also associated with the Mahdi or 12th Imam of Shia belief in a number of ways. One of his titles was Na'eb-e Imam (Deputy to the Twelfth Imam). His enemies were often attacked as taghut and Mofsed-e-filarz, religious terms used for enemies of the Twelfth Imam. Many of the officials of the overthrown Shah's government executed by Revolutionary Courts were convicted of "fighting against the Twelfth Imam" – implying that the revolution was the promised return of the Twelfth Imam". An allegedly eight-century Hadith attributed to the Imam Musa al-Kazim was repeated in Iran as a tribute to Khomeini: "A man will come out from Qom and he will summon people to the right path. There will rally to him people resembling pieces of iron, not to be shaken by violent winds, unsparing and relying on God". Vali Nasr reports that

on one occasion a parliamentary deputy asked him if he was the 'promised Mahdi.' Khomeini did not answer. Fearing that Khomeini had not heard, the MP repeated the question. Khomeini still did not answer, astutely neither claiming nor denying that he was the Twelfth Imam.

As the revolution gained momentum, the awe exhibited towards Khomeini spread to some non-supporters, one of which called him "magnificently clear-minded, single-minded and unswerving." His image was as "absolute, wise, and indispensable leader of the nation":

The Imam, it was generally believed, had shown by his uncanny sweep to power, that he knew how to act in ways which others could not begin to understand. His timing was extraordinary, and his insight into the motivation of others, those around him as well as his enemies, could not be explained as ordinary knowledge. This emergent belief in Khomeini as a divinely guided figure was carefully fostered by the clerics who supported him and spoke up for him in front of the people.

Even many secularists opponents were said to feel the power of his "messianic" appeal. Comparing him to a father figure who retains the enduring loyalty even of children he disapproves of, journalist Afshin Molavi writes that defenses of Khomeini are "heard in the most unlikely settings":

A whiskey-drinking professor told an American journalist that Khomeini brought pride back to Iranians. A women's rights activist told me that Khomeini was not the problem; it was his conservative allies who had directed him wrongly. A nationalist war veteran, who held Iran's ruling clerics in contempt, carried with him a picture of 'the Imam'.

His mausoleum is said (by Vali Nasr) to have been modeled (by his successors) after the shrine of the Imam Reza in Mashhad, and visitors "actively encouraged to perform rituals usually reserved for visits to an imam's final resting place".

=== Sternness and austerity ===
Companions and followers of the Ayatollah Khomeini have shared many stories of his concern for others and his disinterest in personal wealth and comfort.

While the Imam was sometimes flexible over doctrine, changing positions on divorce, music, birth control, he was much less accommodating with those he believed to be the enemies of Islam. Khomeini emphasized not only righteous militancy and rage but hatred,

And I am confident that the Iranian people, particularly our youth, will keep alive in their hearts anger and hatred for the criminal Soviet Union and the warmongering United States. This must be until the banner of Islam flies over every house in the world.

Salman Rushdie's apology for his book (following Khomeini's fatwa to kill the author) was rejected by Khomeini, who told Muslims: "Even if Salman Rushdie repents and becomes the most pious man of all time, it is incumbent on every Muslim to employ everything he has got, his life and wealth, to send him to Hell."

Khomeini attributed some of his reversals to advisers he claimed had persuaded him to make unwise decisions against his better judgment, appointing people to posts who he later denounced. "I swear to God that I was against appointing Medi Bazargan as the first prime minister, too, but I considered him to be a decent person. I also swear to God that I did not vote for Bani Sadr to become president either. On all these occasions I submitted to the advice of my friends." Before being revised in April 1989, the Iranian constitution called for the supreme leader to be a leading cleric (Marja), something Khomeini says he opposed "since from the very beginning."

He also preached of Islam's essentially serious nature:

Allah did not create man so that he could have fun. The aim of creation was for mankind to be put to the test through hardship and prayer. An Islamic regime must be serious in every field. There are no jokes in Islam. There is no humor in Islam. There is no fun in Islam. There can be no fun and joy in whatever is serious. Islam does not allow swimming in the sea and is opposed to radio and television serials. Islam, however, allows marksmanship, horseback riding and competition ...

and the all-encompassing nature of Islam, and thus of its law and its government,

Islam and divine governments ... have commandments for everybody, everywhere, at any place, in any condition. If a person were to commit an immoral dirty deed right next to his house, Islamic governments have business with him. .... Islam has rules for every person, even before birth, before his marriage, until his marriages, pregnancy, birth, until upbringing of the child, the education of the adult, until puberty, youth, until old age, until death, into the grave, and beyond the grave.

=== Mysticism ===
A number of writers have mentioned the importance of mysticism in the thinking of Khomeini. According to scholar Vali Nasr, Khomeini's "politics and religious views reflected not so Shia history and theology (indeed, he was something of a theological innovator and maverick) as the authority that he claimed by virtue of his understanding of mystical doctrines. His was a new Shiism, interpreted by someone who claimed direct knowledge of the Truth."

== International tenets ==
=== Spread of Islam ===
Khomeini strongly supported the spread of Islam throughout the world. In one of his speeches, Khomeini declared:

We shall export our revolution to the whole world. Until the cry 'There is no god but Allah' resounds over the whole world, there will be struggle.

Spreading of Islam would not exclude warfare:

Once we have won the war [with Iraq], we shall turn to other wars. For that would not be enough. We have to wage war until all corruption, all disobedience of Islamic law ceases [throughout the world]. The Quran commands: “War! War until victory!” A religion without war is a crippled religion... Allah be praised, our young warriors are putting this command into effect and fighting. They know that to kill the infidels is one of the noblest missions Allah has reserved for mankind.

Islam would exist not just as a faith, but as a state:

Establishing the Islamic state world-wide belong to the great goals of the revolution.

Khomeini believed Islam would replace both capitalism and communism:

... `We have often proclaimed this truth in our domestic and foreign policy, namely that we have set as our goal the world-wide spread of the influence of Islam and the suppression of the rule of the world conquerors ... We wish to cause the corrupt roots of Zionism, capitalism and Communism to wither throughout the world. We wish, as does God almighty, to destroy the systems which are based on these three foundations, and to promote the Islamic order of the Prophet ... in the world of arrogance.

Khomeini held these views both prior to and following the revolution. The following was published in 1942 and republished during his years as supreme leader:

Jihad or Holy War, which is for the conquest of countries and kingdoms, becomes incumbent after the formation of the Islamic state in the presence of the Imam or in accordance with his command. Then Islam makes it incumbent on all adult males, provided they are not disabled and incapacitated, to prepare themselves for the conquest of countries so that the writ of Islam is obeyed in every country in the world... those who study Islamic Holy War will understand why Islam wants to conquer the whole world. All the countries conquered by Islam or to be conquered in the future will be marked for everlasting salvation... Islam says: Whatever good there is exists thanks to the sword and in the shadow of the sword! People cannot be made obedient except with the sword! The sword is the key to Paradise, which can be opened only for Holy Warriors! There are hundreds of other [Qur'anic] psalms and Hadiths [sayings of Muhammad] urging Muslims to value war and to fight. Does all that mean that Islam is a religion that prevents men from waging war? I spit upon those foolish souls who make such a claim.

Vali Nasr believes Khomeini saw his revolution as Islamic, not specifically Shia, and saw the Islamic Republic as "the base for a global Islamic movement" led by him, "in much the same way" as Bolshevik leaders Lenin and Trotsky, had seen "Russia as the springboard country of what was meant to be a global communist revolution." Olivier Roy writes that Khomeini did "extoll" Shiism and saw a special role for the Shi'a, but not one of privilege. He thought of Shia, "the way Marx thought of the proletariat: a particular group that brings about the emancipation of all humanity," by leading a revolution to form a new world order.

=== Unity of the Ummah ===
Khomeini made efforts to establish unity among Ummah and "bridge the gap between Shiites and Sunnis", especially during the early days of the Revolution, according to at least Vali Nasr because "he wanted to be accepted as the leader of the Muslim world, period". One way to do this was to focus on issues that united Muslims – anti-Imperialism, anti-Zionism, anti-Americanism, and "the battle against outsiders" – rather than "religious questions that were likely to divide them". He forbade Shia to criticize the Caliphs that preceded Ali (who Shia traditionally saw as usurpers, who should not have been chosen as leaders over Ali), and "declared it permissible for Shiites to pray behind Sunni imams." He supported "Islamic Unity week" (which includes the day when Sunnis believe Muhammad was born – 12 Rabi' al-Awwal – and the day most Shia believe he was – 17 Rabi' al-Awwal), and International Day of Quds.

Shortly before he died, the famous South Asian Islamist Abul Ala Maududi paid Khomeini the compliment of saying he wished he had accomplished what Khomeini had, and that he would have liked to have been able to visit Iran to see the revolution for himself.

The draft constitution of Iran in June 1979 promised that "Persians, Turks, Kurds, Arabs, Baluchis, Turkomans, and others will enjoy equal rights." Khomeini stated in November 1979 that "sometimes the word 'minorities' is used to refer to people such as Kurds, Lurs, Turks, Persians, Baluchis, and such. These people should not be called minorities, because this term assumes there is a difference between these brothers. In Islam, such a difference has no place at all. There is no difference between Muslims who speak different languages, for instance, the Arabs or the Persians. It is very probable that such problems have been created by those who do not wish the Muslim countries to be united. They create the issues of nationalism, of Pan-Iranism, Pan-Turkism, and such -isms which are contrary to Islamic doctrines. Their plan is to destroy Islam and Islamic philosophy."

In Sunni-Shia unity, as in many other issues, there was a divide between Khomeini's views before and after 1970. In his early treatise "Kashf al Asrar", Khomeini reportedly expressed anti-Sunni views, such as accusing caliphs Abu Bakr and Umar – companions of Muhammad and highly revered by Sunni Muslims – of kufr (disbelief) and of altering the Qur'an, and calling them "ignorant fools, hobos and tyrants" unworthy of being Caliphs. He also allegedly accused the vast majority of the Companions as being party to Abu Bakr and Umar's alleged "crimes". In addition, Khomeini reportedly claimed that Sunnis had fabricated hadiths for political purposes and that some Sunni scholars were pawns of the Great Satan. Khomeini had portrayed non-Shia schools in general of being submissive to rulers, while Shias always supported revolution against tyrants. According to Sa`id Hawwa in his book al-Khumayniyya, Khomeini's real aim was to spread Shi'ism through the use of such tactics as taqiyya and anti-Zionist rhetoric. Nevertheless, he called upon the Sunni masses to join hands with the Islamic Revolution against "America and Zionism".

To accomplish the ideological objectives of Khomeinism, Iran began training thousands of Shia militants across the Arab World and eventually outside the Muslim World as well.

Khomeini's "Islamic Brotherhood" did not extend to the Wahhabi regime of Saudi Arabia, whom he vehemently hated and regarded as apostates. Under his leadership the Iranian government cut off all relations with Saudi Arabia. Khomeini even declared that Iran may one day start good diplomatic relations with the US or Iraq but never with Saudi Arabia. Iran did not re-establish diplomatic relations with Saudi Arabia until March 1991, after Khomeini's death.

Since the death of Khomeini, Iranian leaders have become more sectarian and Sunnis victim to systemic discrimination.

=== Shia revival ===
The Iranian revolution "awakened" Shia around the world, who, outside of Iran, were subordinate to Sunnis. Shia "became bolder in their demands of rights and representations", and in some instances Khomeini supported them. In Pakistan, he is reported to have told Pakistan military ruler Zia ul-Haq that he would do to al-Haq "what he had done to the Shah" if al-Haq mistreated Shia. When tens of thousands of Shia protested for exemption from Islamic taxes based on Sunni law, al-Haq conceded to their demands.

Shia Islamist groups that sprang up during the 1980s, and often received "financial and political support from Tehran", include the Amal Movement of Musa al-Sadr and later the Hezbollah movement in Lebanon, Islamic Dawa Party in Iraq, Hizb-e Wahdat in Afghanistan, Tehreek-e-Jafaria in Pakistan, al-Wifaq in Bahrain, and Hezbollah Al-Hejaz and al-Haraka al-Islahiya al-Islamiya in Saudi Arabia. Shia were involved in the 1979–80 riots and demonstrations in oil-rich eastern Saudi Arabia, the 1981 Bahraini coup d'état attempt and the 1983 Kuwait bombings.

=== Neither East nor West ===
Khomeini strongly opposed alliances with, or imitation of, Eastern (communist) and Western Bloc (capitalist) nations. The slogan "Neither East nor West", meant not only opposition to the two superpower blocs, but also keeping Iran and Islam uncontaminated by their ideas and ideologies.

In our domestic and foreign policy, ... we have set as our goal the world-wide spread of the influence of Islam ... We wish to cause the corrupt roots of Zionism, capitalism and Communism to wither throughout the world. We wish, as does God almighty, to destroy the systems which are based on these three foundations, and to promote the Islamic order of the Prophet ...

Despite commonalities between the Islamic Republic and Marxist thought and practice – Iran nationalized many of its industries, strongly denounced foreign intervention of capitalist powers, shared anti-capitalist, anti-imperialist rhetoric (even borrowing imagery from Marxists), (Note: Under Khomeini, the Islamic Republic celebrated 1 May (May Day) as the Festival of the Islamic Workers. Khomeini cited a hadith to the effect that the sweat of the worker meant more in the eyes of Allah than the prayers of the faithful.") while Iran's Tudeh (Communist) party saw itself as part of "a front of cooperation ... for popular support of the anti-imperialist revolution of February 1979"before its membership was imprisoned – Khomeini was "anti-Marxist", and did not follow the Marxist economic analysis of capitalism being the cause of imperialism, and socialism its cure. Even before taking power, Khomeini attacked the Iranian left, claiming that the Tudeh party was cooperating with the shah, accusing Marxists of planning "to stab Muslims in the back, and denounced Russia as a greedy superpower".

In the Last Message, The Political and Divine Will of His Holiness the Imam Khomeini, there are no less than 21 warnings on the dangers of what the west or east, or of pro-western or pro-eastern agents are either doing, have done or will do to Islam and the rest of the world.

In particular he loathed the United States

... the foremost enemy of Islam ... a terrorist state by nature that has set fire to everything everywhere ... oppression of Muslim nations is the work of the USA ...

and its ally Israel

the international Zionism does not stop short of any crime to achieve its base and greedy desires, crimes that the tongue and pen are ashamed to utter or write.

Khomeini believed that Iran must strive towards self-reliance. Rather than siding with one or the other of the world's two blocs (at the time of the revolution), he favored the allying of Muslim states with each other, eventually uniting into one state. In his book Islamic Government he hinted governments would soon fall into line if an Islamic government was established.

If the form of government willed by Islam were to come into being, none of the governments now existing in the world would be able to resist it; they would all capitulate.

== Unintended consequences ==
=== Weakening of religion ===
According to Abbas Djavadi, the state power granted Shi'i clerics in the Islamic Republic of Iran has weakened the traditional bond between the masses of devout Shi'a (i.e. Twelver, Usuli Shi'a), and the networks of the sources of emulation (marja'-i taqlid) that traditionally guided them.

The marja', a centuries-old concept in Usuli Shi'i Islam, are religious authorities, the most learned and respected scholars. Each devout Shia who does not have the scholarly religious education to make decisions by themselves (known as a muqallid), chooses a marja' as their guide; they consult their marjas risalah (religious reference book), their marjas representative, or sometimes the marja' themselves, before making decisions when they are in doubt on important religious, social, or political questions.

Voluntarily chosen, Marja' are traditionally dependent solely on voluntary religious donations. One of the qualities sought after when choosing a marja' is being “clean” of political or business interests.

According to Djavadi, the creation of the Islamic Republic changed this traditional framework. After the revolution “most" of the influential and popular marja's, such as Mohammad Kazem Shariatmadari and Hussein-Ali Montazeri, were

put under house arrest or forced into passivity. Under the new system, more than 200,000 mullahs became receivers of government salaries and benefits -- and were therefore largely silenced. This was an unprecedented development in Iranian history, during which Shi'ite clerics were always dependent solely on voluntary religious donations.”

But this hasn't been just a transfer of power and influence from voluntary pious support for the marja' networks to state power given by the constitution for the clergy.

The more the Islamic regime's leading clerics have distanced themselves from religion in order to cling to power, the more they have come to depend on the Islamic Revolutionary Guard Corps, the Basij militia, and the notorious "plainclothes militia" to maintain their positions by force. The five years of Mahmud Ahmadinejad's presidency have seen the further strengthening of the Revolutionary Guard and the gradual transition from religious authoritarianism to a military dictatorship with religious trappings.

An opinion poll dated June 2020 based on interviews with 40,000 literate Iranians above 19 years in Iran, found 47% of all respondents, and 52% of those respondents aged 20–29 years old, stated they had gone "from being religious to non-religious". Only 32% identified themselves as Shiite Muslims. (In contrast, World Atlas estimates 92% of the Muslims in Iran are Shi'i Muslim, while other sources estimate 99.98%,-96.6% of Iranians are Muslim.)

Before the 1979 Revolution, Shia clerics were among the most trusted societal groups. However, a confidential survey in 2023 by the Ministry of Islamic Guidance and Culture found that only 25% of respondents still have some level of trust in them. Approximately 56% expressed little to no trust, while the remaining 18% fell somewhere in between.

Anecdotal reports indicate a decline in religiosity also. According to Christopher de Bellaigue, "in the early 1980s, clerics were generally treated with elaborate courtesy. Nowadays [in 2002], clerics are sometimes insulted by schoolchildren and taxi drivers and they quite often put on normal clothes when venturing outside" the holy city of "Qom." According to journalist David Hirst, the Islamist government in Iran

has turned people in ever increasing numbers not only against the mullahs but also against Islam itself. The signs are everywhere, from the fall in attendance at religious schools to the way parents give pre-Islamic, Persian names to their children. If they are looking for authenticity, Iranians now chiefly find it in nationalism, not in religion.

Iranian sociologist Asef Bayat has described these social changes through the concept of "post-Islamism" in the mid-1990s, arguing that decades of authoritarian moral and political control have fostered new youth identities and everyday practices that challenge Islamist norms without rejecting Islam itself. He observes that urban youth increasingly engage in cultural and social behaviors, such as alternative music scenes, changing fashions, informal dating, and more flexible observance of hijab, that reflect a loosening of strict moral regulation. Bayat emphasizes that this shift does not amount to secularization: many young people continue to express religious belief and attachment to Islam, but in forms that seek to reconcile personal autonomy, cultural expression, and faith.

== Western reception ==
After the collapse of the Eastern Bloc and the Soviet Union, Khomeini's legacy lives on in the Western world. From the beginning of the Iranian Revolution to the time of his death Khomeini's "glowering visage became the virtual face of Islam in Western popular culture" and "inculcated fear and distrust towards Islam." He is said to have made the word "Ayatollah" (a Shii'i clerical ranking) "a synonym for a dangerous madman ... in popular parlance." His fatwa calling for the death of secular Muslim author Salman Rushdie in particular was seen by some as a deft attempt to create a wedge issue that would prevent Muslims from imitating the West by "dividing Muslims from Westerners along the default lines of culture." The fatwa was greeted with headlines such as one in the popular British newspaper the Daily Mirror referring to Khomeini as "that Mad Mullah", observations in a British magazine that the Ayatollah seemed "a familiar ghost from the past – one of those villainous Muslim clerics, a Faqir of Ipi or a mad Mullah, who used to be portrayed, larger than life, in popular histories of the British Empire", and laments that Khomeini fed the Western stereotype of "the backward, cruel, rigid Muslim, burning books and threatening to kill the blasphemer." To many westerners, the fatwa indicated Khomeini's contempt for the right to life, for the presumption of innocence, for the rule of law, and for national sovereignty, since he ordered Rushdie killed 'wherever he is found'.

This was particularly the case in the largest nation of the Western bloc – the United States (or "Great Satan") – where Khomeini and the Islamic Republic are remembered for the American embassy hostage taking and accused of sponsoring hostage-taking and terrorist attacks – especially using the Lebanese Shi'a Islamic group Hezbollah (Note: for example the 1983 Beirut barracks bombing see:Hizb'allah in Lebanon : The Politics of the Western Hostage Crisis Magnus Ranstorp, Department of International Relations University of St. Andrews St. Martins Press, New York, 1997, pp. 54, 117) – and which continues to apply economic sanctions against Iran as of 2024. Popular feeling during the hostage-taking was so high in the United States that some Iranians had complained that they felt the need to hide their Iranian identity for fear of physical attack.

== Influences ==
Khomeini was "not in the habit" of providing footnotes to his works or otherwise acknowledging the influence of others on his ideas, especially if the influences were "foreign or secular". Nonetheless, his ideas as a revolutionary and as Supreme Leader of Iran are thought to have been influenced by a number of people: Sunni Islamists, particularly Sayyid Rashid Rida, Hassan al-Banna (founder of the Muslim Brotherhood organization), Sayyid Qutb, and Abul A'la Maududi; and also Shia thinkers and activists included Fazlullah Nouri, Navvab Safavi, Jalal Al-e-Ahmad, Ali Shariati, Muhammad Baqir al-Sadr.

=== Fazlullah Nouri ===
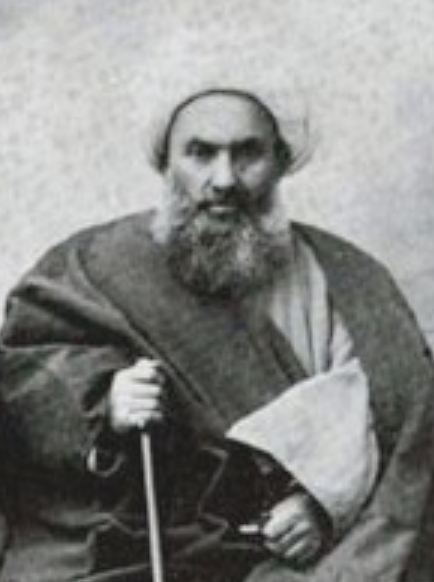
Fazlollah Nouri

Fazlullah Nouri (1843–1909), enemy of the 1905–1922 Persian Constitutional Revolution, was praised by Khomeini as an "heroic figure", and some believe Khomeini's own opposition to constitutionalism and a secular government were influenced by Nuri's objections to the 1907 constitution.

Nouri declared the new constitution contrary to sharia law and spread anti-constitutional propaganda in his newspaper and in leaflets he published. He proclaimed sentiments similar to Khomeini's, such as

Shari'a covers all regulations of government, and specifies all obligations and duties, so the needs of the people of Iran in matters of law are limited to the business of government, which, by reason of universal accidents, has become separated from Shari'a. ... Now the people have thrown out the law of the Prophet and have set up their own law instead.

He led direct action against his opponents, such as an around-the-clock sit-in for three months by a large group of followers in the Shah Abdul Azim shrine; recruiting mercenaries to harass the supporters of democracy, and leading a mob towards Tupkhanih Square December 22, 1907 to attack merchants and loot stores.

In the Islamic Republic he has been called the "Islamic movement's first martyr in contemporary Iran", and honored with an expressway named after him and postage stamps issued for him (the only figure of his era so honored).

=== Rashid Rida ===
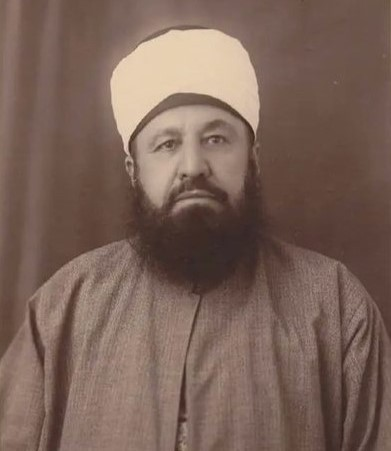
Rashid Rida

Arguably the first prominent Islamist, and "one of the first theoreticians of the Islamic state", Sinni Islamic jurist Rashid Rida (1865–1935) published a series of articles from 1922–1923 in Al-Manar (later a book) titled “The Caliphate or the Supreme Imamate” in which he advocated for the restoration of the Caliphate ruled by Muslim jurists, and proposed revival measures of the Islamic Salafiyya movement to reform education and purify Islam across the globe. Khomeini's manifesto Islamic Government, Guardianship of the jurist, was (according to Mehdi Khalaji) greatly influenced by Rida's book and by his analysis of the post-colonial Muslim world.

=== Fada'ian-e Islam ===
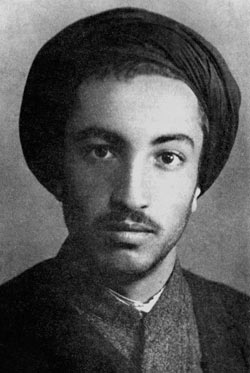
Navvab Safavi

Fada'iyan-e Islam (1946-1955) was a Shia fundamentalist terrorist group that killed a number of well known Iranian secularists. At least one source (Sohrab Behdad), credits the group and its leader, Navvab Safavi (1924–1956), with influence on the Islamic Revolution. According to Encyclopaedia Iranica, "there are important similarities between much of the Fedāʾīān's basic views and certain principles and actions of the Islamic Republic of Iran: the Fedāʾīān and Ayatollah Khomeini were in accord on issues such as the role of clerics", (who should be judges, educators and moral guides to the people); of ethics and morality, (where all non-Islamic laws should be abolished and all sharia law applied, thus limiting all sorts of behavior); the place of the poor (to be raised up), the rights of religious minorities and women, (to be kept down), and "attitudes toward foreign powers" (dangerous conspirators to be kept out).

=== Sayyid Qutb ===
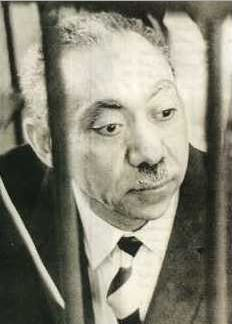
Sayyid Qutb

In his 1964 manifesto (Milestones) Egyptian Islamist and jihadist ideologue Sayyid Qutb (1906–1966) expressed some of the same ideas as Khomeini in his 1969 work Islamic Government, namely an extremely high regard for the powers of Sharia law, and a belief that a senseless unprovoked aggressive hatred of Islam and Muslims by Non-Muslims has led to suffering and destruction, (sometimes called the "War on Islam") and must be defeated.

Qutb preached that the West has a centuries-long "enmity toward Islam" and a "well-thought-out scheme ... to demolish the structure of Muslim society", but at the same time knows its "civilization is unable to present any healthy values for the guidance of mankind"; Khomeini preached that Western unbelievers want "to keep us backward, to keep us in our present miserable state so they can exploit our riches ..."

Qutb considered Sharia a branch of "that universal law which governs the entire universe ... as accurate and true as any of the laws known as the `laws of nature`", physics, biology, etc. Better than that, applying sharia law would bring "harmony between human life and the universe", results otherwise "postponed for the next life", though not quite at the same level of perfection as heaven. Khomeini doesn't compare Sharia to heaven but does say

"God, Exalted and Almighty, by means of the Most Noble Messenger (peace and blessing be upon him), sent laws that astound us with their magnitude. He instituted laws and practices for all human affairs ... There is not a single topic in human life for which Islam has not provided instruction and established a norm."

The explanation for why these laws are not in effect is that "in order to make the Muslims, especially the intellectuals and the younger generation, deviate from the path of Islam, foreign agents have constantly insinuated that Islam has nothing to offer, that Islam consists of a few ordinances concerning menstruation and parturition ..."

Qutb's works enjoyed remarkable popularity in Iran both before and after the revolution as they were translated by Iranian Islamists into Persian. Prominent figures such as current Iranian Supreme Leader Ali Khamenei and his brother Muhammad Ali Khamenei, Aḥmad Aram, Hadi Khosroshahi, etc. translated Qutb's works. In 1984, the Islamic Republic of Iran under Khomeini honoured Qutb's "martyrdom" by issuing an iconic postage stamp showing him behind bars.

=== Gharbzadegi ===
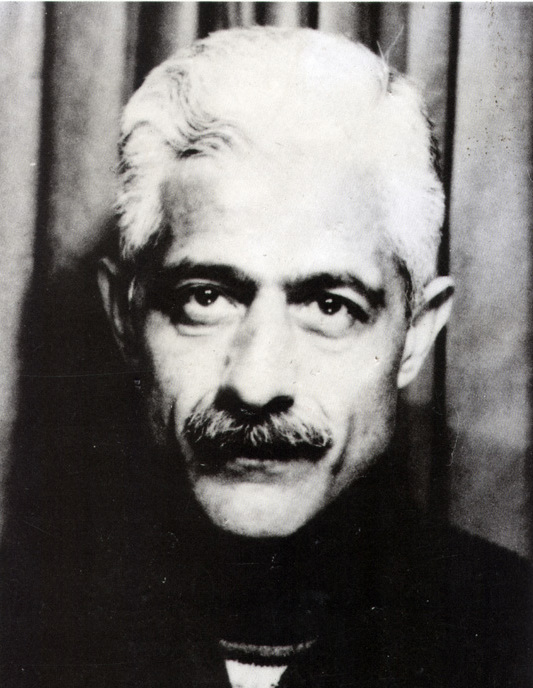
Jalal Al-e-Ahmad

In 1962, Jalal Al-e-Ahmad (1923-1969) clandestinely published a book or pamphlet called Occidentosis (Gharbzadegi): A Plague from the West. It "spearheaded" the search by Western educated/secular Iranians (a group typically immune to calls by the Islamic clergy to repentant and obey God) for "Islamic roots", combining a call for a return to Islam, with a "strong Marxist flavor" and an analysis of society "through a class perspective."

Al-e-Ahmad, who was from a deeply religious family but had had a Western education and been a member of the Tudeh (Communist) party, argued that Iran was intoxicated or infatuated (zadegi) with Western (gharb) technology, culture, products, and so had become a victim of the West's "toxins" or disease. The adoption and imitation of Western models and Western criteria in education, the arts, and culture led to the loss of Iranian cultural identity, and a transformation of Iran into a passive market for Western goods and a pawn in Western geopolitics.

At least one historian (Ervand Abrahamian) speculates Al-e-Ahmad may have been an influence on Khomeini's turning away from traditional Shi'i thought towards populism, class struggle and revolution. Fighting Gharbzadegi became part of the ideology of the 1979 Iranian Revolution – the emphasis on nationalization of industry, "self-sufficiency" in economics, independence in all areas of life from both the Western (and Soviet) world. He was also one of the main influences of the later Islamic Republic president Ahmadinejad. The Islamic Republic issued a postage stamp honoring Al-e-Ahmad in 1981.

Al-e-Ahmad "was the only contemporary writer ever to obtain favorable comments from Khomeini", who wrote in a 1971 message to Iranian pilgrims on going on Hajj,

"The poisonous culture of imperialism [is] penetrating to the depths of towns and villages throughout the Muslim world, displacing the culture of the Qur'an, recruiting our youth en masse to the service of foreigners and imperialists..."

=== Ali Shariati ===
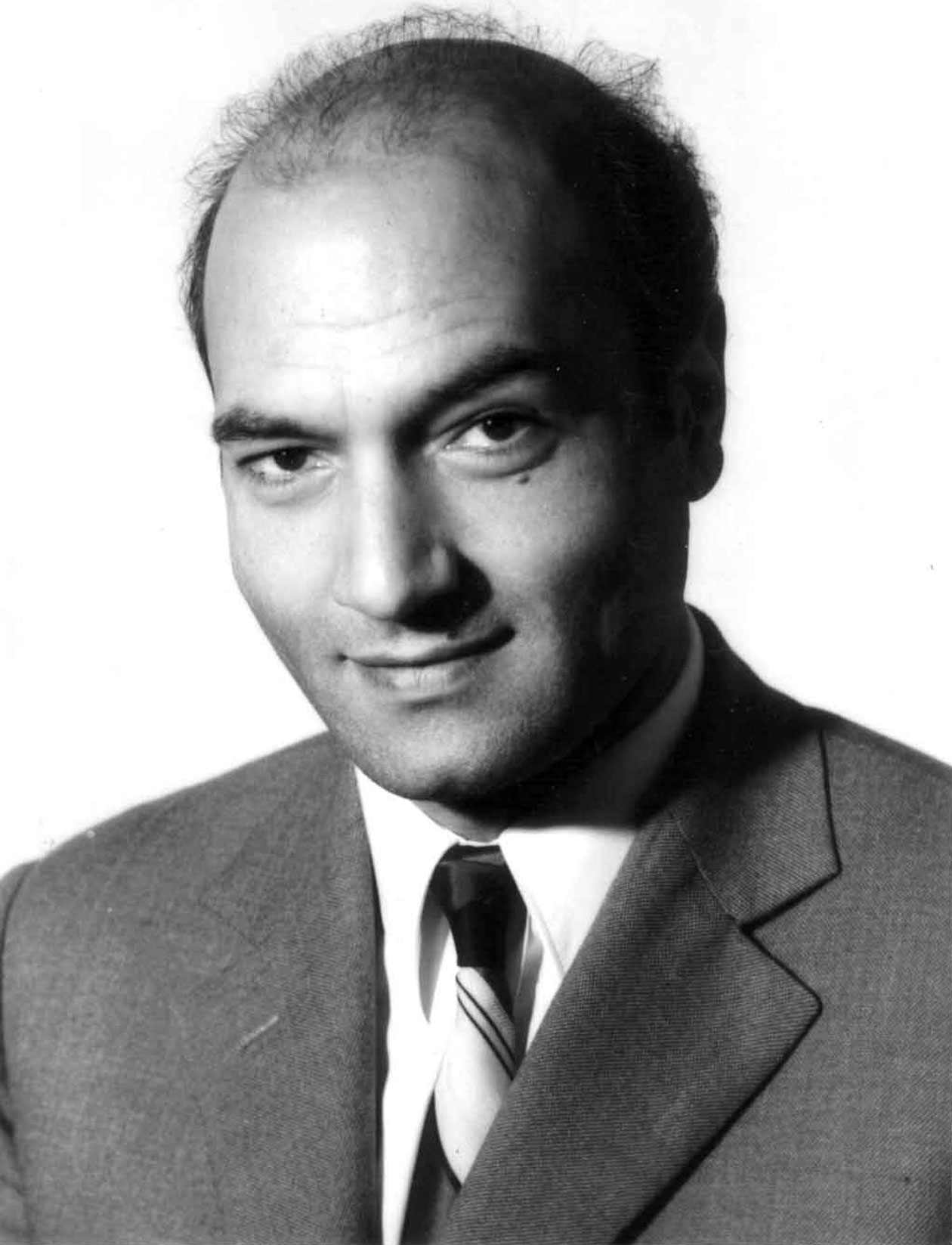
Ali Shariati

Like Al-e-Ahmad, Ali Shariati (1933–1977) was a late twentieth century Iranian figure from a strongly religious family, given a modern education, exposed to Marxist thought, and who reinvented Shia religiosity for those with secular education.

Shariati was "the most outspoken representative" of the Socialist or Red Shia movement, with "phenomenal" popularity among the "young intelligentsia" of Iran, influencing young clerics as well as secular youth. This mattered in Iran because Iran's education system was "substantially superior" to that of its neighbors, and by 1979 had about 175,000 students, 67,000 studying abroad away from the supervision of its oppressive security force the SAVAK. The early 1970s saw a "blossoming" of Marxist groups around the world including among Iranian post-secondary students.

Although a harsh critic of traditional Usuli Shi'i clergy, who he and other leftist Shia believed were standing in the way of the revolutionary potential of the masses – focusing on the traditional mourning and lamentation for the martyrs, awaiting the return of the messiah, when they should have been in the fight "against the state injustice begun by Ali and Hussein" – he helped make the "modern middle class" receptive to cleric Khomeini. Khomeini was able to win over Shariati's followers with his forthright denunciation of the monarchy; his refusal to join fellow theologians in criticizing the Hosseiniyeh Ershad (a non-traditionalist venue where Shariati often spoke); "by openly attacking the apolitical and the pro-regime 'ulama; by stressing such themes as revolution, anti-imperialism, and the radical message of Muharram; and by incorporating into his public declarations such `Fanonist` terms as the `mostazafin will inherit the earth`, `the country needs a cultural revolution,` and the `people will dump the exploiters onto the garbage heap of history.`" (Note: Following in the footsteps of Marxists around the world, Iranian revolutionaries attempted to interest the rural poor of Iran to class struggle. After one failed uprising, some of the young revolutionaries, realizing that the Iranian masses were too religious to relate to Marxist concepts, began projecting "the Messianic expectations of communist and Third World peoples onto Revolutionary Shi'ism", i.e. socialist Shi'ism. Ali Shariati was "the most outspoken representative of this group", and a figure without equivalent in "fame or influence" in Sunni Islam. He had come from a "strictly religious family" but had studied in Paris and been influenced by the writings of Jean-Paul Sartre, Frantz Fanon and Che Guevara.)

Socialist Shia believed Imam Hussein was not just a holy figure but the original oppressed one (muzloun), and his killer, the Sunni Umayyad Caliphate, the "analog" of the modern Iranian people's "oppression by the shah". His killing at Karbala was not just an "eternal manifestation of the truth but a revolutionary act by a revolutionary hero". An example of his influence on Khomeini is the use by Khomeini of a saying from the 19th century that Shariati popularized as a slogan: 'Every place should be turned into Karbala, every month into Moharram, and every day into Ashara'.

=== Baqir al-Sadr ===
In Iraq, another cleric from a distinguished clerical family, Muhammad Baqir al-Sadr (1935–1980), became the ideological founder of the Islamist Islamic Dawa Party (formed in 1957, with pan-Islamic goals similar to that of Muslim Brotherhood), and author of several influential works including Iqtisaduna on Islamic economics (Our Economics), and Falsafatuna (Our Philosophy), In which he sought to counter secularists and communists arguments that Islam lacked solutions to modern social-economic problems. He has been called (by Gilles Kepel), a "leading theorist of Islamic finance", "one of the foremost Islamic thinkers of the late 20th century", and "Iraq's main Shiite personality" at the time of his death. According to Talib M. Aziz, "his major intellectual achievement", was being the first writer to formulate "an Islamic economic doctrine based on Islamic law".

As Khomeini did from 1970–1980, al-Sadr sought to combine populism with religious revival, claiming that "the call for return to Islam is a call for a return to God's dispensation, and necessitates a 'social revolution' against 'injustice' and 'exploitation.'" Shortly after the fall of the Shah of Iran he wrote an essay on "the structure of an Islamic state, the functions of each of its branches of government, the responsibilities of the marja’ in the state, and the legitimacy of his absolute authority according to Shi’a Islam", that appears to have been quite influential in the writing of the constitution of the Islamic Republic of Iran.

After a military coup in 1958, a pro-Soviet General Abd al-Karim Qasim came to power in Iraq, winning popular support by closing British military bases and killing off the Westernized political elite. But the Iraqi Communist Party coup emerged as a "major political force" after the coup, and the Qasim regime spread "intense secular and antireligious propaganda" and applied pressure on Islam and centers of religious learning – such as Najaf were al-Sadr worked – under the theory that religion was an obstacle to modernity and progress. Ayatollah Muhsin al-Hakim, located in Iraq and one of the leading Shi'i Marja' clerics at the time, issued fatwa against communism.Qasim was overthrown in 1963, but the crackdown on Shi'i religious centers escalated; periodicals, religious schools and seminaries were closed, non-Iraqi students expelled from Najaf, the government attempted to ban annual ceremonies commemorating Imam Husayn’s martyrdom in 1977. Ayatullah Mohsin al-Hakim called Shias to protest. This helped Baqir al-Sadr's rise to prominence as he visited Lebanon and sent telegrams to different international figures, including Abul A'la Maududi. Al-Sadr was killed by the Saddam Hussein regime in April 1980 after several actions in support of the Iranian Islamic revolution.

== Works ==
- Wilayat al-Faqih
- Forty Hadith (Forty Traditions)
- Adab as Salat (The Disciplines of Prayers)
- Jihade Akbar (The Greater Struggle)

== See also ==
- Conservatism in Iran
- LGBTQ history in Iran
- LGBTQ rights in Iran
- Human rights in the Islamic Republic of Iran

=== Related concepts ===
- Imam's Line
- Ideology of the Iranian Revolution
  - Government of the Islamic Republic of Iran
  - Hezbollah
  - History of the Islamic Republic of Iran
  - Human rights in the Islamic Republic of Iran
- Iranian opposition
- Islam in Iran
- Islamism
- Islamic scholars
- Leninism
- Politics of Iran
- Populism
- Qutbism
- Shia Islamism
- Mahmoud Taleghani
- Hossein-Ali Montazeri
- Tahrir-ol-vasyleh

=== Other ideologies ===
- Liberalism in Iran (Mosaddeghism)
- Monarchism in Iran (Pahlavism)
- Secularism in Iran (Anti-Islamism)
- Socialism in Iran (Shariatism)

=== Other topics ===
- Kartir
- Kartir's inscription at Naqsh-e Rajab

== Bibliography ==
- Abrahamian, Ervand (1982). Iran Between Two Revolutions. Princeton University Press.
- Abrahamian, Ervand (1993). Khomeinism: Essays on the Islamic Republic. University of California Press. ISBN 978-0-520-08503-9.
- Abrahamian, Ervand (1999). Tortured Confessions by Ervand Abrahamian. University of California Press.
- Bakhash, Shaul (1984). The Reign of the Ayatollahs : Iran and the Islamic Revolution. New York: Basic Books.
- Brumberg, Daniel (2001). Reinventing Khomeini : The Struggle for Reform in Iran. Chicago: University of Chicago Press.
- Farzaneh, Mateo Mohammad (March 2015). Iranian Constitutional Revolution and the Clerical Leadership of Khurasani. Syracuse, NY: Syracuse University Press. ISBN 9780815633884. OCLC 931494838.
- Harney, Desmond (1998). The Priest and the King : An Eyewitness Account of the Iranian Revolution. I.B. Tauris.
- Kepel, Gilles (2002). Jihad : the Trail of Political Islam. Belknap, Harvard University Press.
- Khomeini, Ruhollah (1981). Algar, Hamid (ed.). Islam and Revolution : Writing and Declarations of Imam Khomeini. Translated by Algar, Hamid. Berkeley: Mizan Press.
- Khomeini, Ruhollah (1980). Sayings of the Ayatollah Khomeini : Political, Philosophical, Social, and Religious. Bantam. ISBN 9780553140323.
- Mackey, Sandra (1996). The Iranians : Persia, Islam and the Soul of a Nation. Dutton. ISBN 0-525-94005-7.
- Moin, Baqer (2000). Khomeini: Life of the Ayatollah. New York: Thomas Dunne Books.
- Nasr, Vali (2006). The Shia Revival : How Conflicts Within Islam Will Create the Future. Norton.
- Rahnema, Ali (1 November 2005). Pioneers of Islamic Revival. London, UK: Zed Books. ISBN 9781842776155.
- Rahnema, Ali (2000). An Islamic Utopian – A Political Biography of Ali Shari'ati. London, NY: I.B. Tauris. ISBN 1860645526.
- Roy, Olivier (1994). "The Failure of Political Islam". The Failure of Political Islam. Translated by Volk, Carol. Cambridge, MA: Harvard University Press. ISBN 9780674291409.
- Schirazi, Asghar (1997). The Constitution of Iran. New York: Tauris.
- Taheri, Amir (1985). The Spirit of Allah. Adler & Adler.
- Willett, Edward C.;Ayatollah Khomeini, 2004, Publisher:The Rosen Publishing Group ISBN 0-8239-4465-4
- Wright, Robin (1989). In the Name of God : The Khomeini Decade. New York: Simon & Schuster. ISBN 9780671672355.
- Wright, Robin (2000). The Last Revolution. New York: Knopf.
- Lee, James (1984). The Final Word!: An American Refutes the Sayings of Ayatollah Khomeini. Philosophical Library. ISBN 0-8022-2465-2.
- Dabashi, Hamid (2006). Theology of Discontent: The Ideological Foundation of the Islamic Revolution in Iran. Transaction Publishers. ISBN 1-4128-0516-3.
- Hoveyda, Fereydoun (2003). The Shah and the Ayatollah: Iranian Mythology and Islamic Revolution. Praeger/Greenwood. ISBN 0-275-97858-3.

== Journals ==
- Aziz, T. M. (May 1993). "The Role of Muhammad Baqir al-Sadr in Shi'i Political Activism in Iraq from 1958 to 1980". International Journal of Middle East Studies. 25 (2): 207–22. doi:10.1017/S0020743800058499. JSTOR 164663. S2CID 162623601.
- Behdad, Sohrab (January 1997). "Islamic Utopia in Pre-Revolutionary Iran: Navvab Safavi and the Fada'ian-e Eslam". Middle Eastern Studies. 33 (1): 40–65. doi:10.1080/00263209708701141. JSTOR 4283846.
- Khalaji, Mehdi (27 November 2009). "The Dilemmas of Pan-Islamic Unity". Current Trends in Islamist Ideology. 9: 64–79.
- Martin, V. A. (April 1986). "The Anti-Constitutionalist Arguments of Shaikh Fazlallah Nuri". Middle Eastern Studies. 22 (2): 181–96. doi:10.1080/00263208608700658. JSTOR 4283111.
