= Amir Farshad Ebrahimi =

Iranian activist

Amir Farshad Ebrahimi امیرفرشاد ابراهیمی
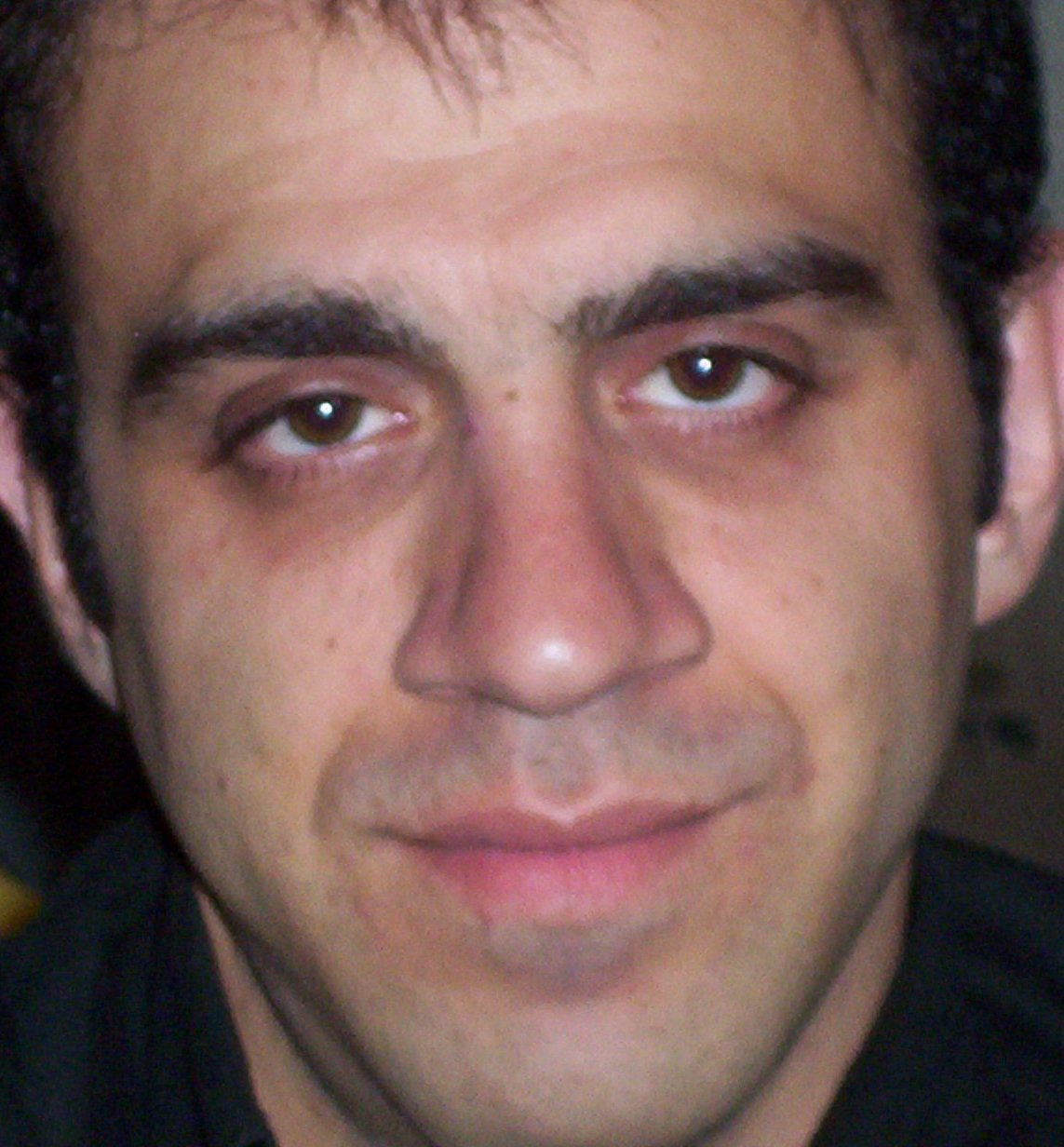
- Born: August 14, 1975 (age 51); Tehran, Iran
- Education: Tehran University

Amir Farshad Ebrahimi (Persian: امیر فرشاد ابراهیمی) (born August 14, 1975) is a founding and former member of hard-line pressure group Ansar-e Hezbollah, a former member of the Basij militia, and an Iranian journalist. Quitting Ansar-e Hezbollah after its involvement in the attack on students in 1999, he was imprisoned in Iran, fled to Turkey and then Germany, where as of 2009 he worked to publicly identify members of plain-clothed men who beat up Iranian protesters of the disputed election.

== Biography ==
Ebrahimi states that in 1988, when he only just 13 years old, he forged an ID and volunteered to fight in the Iran–Iraq War. After the war, believing their sacrifice had given them the right to make "some demands", he and other veterans founded the Ansar-e Hezbollah (Supporters of the Party of God), to serve as guardians of the Islamic revolution, defending it from corruption and Western influence. He rose through the ranks of the organization and became the managing editor of the group's newspaper, Ya Lesarat Hossein. By 1999 he was political secretary of Ansar-e Hezbollah.

=== Quitting Ansar-e Hezbollah and confession ===
According to his own statements, he quit the organization as a result of Ansar-e Hezbollah's use of violence against Tehran University students during the July 1999 protests when, he decided (in his words), "No, Ansar-e Hezbollah is wrong, you the students are right."

"I'm still shocked at how they can [be so violent] and why a group that was supposed to be soldiers of the Hidden Imam, a group that was supposed to follow the path of the martyrs, is now turning the guns that were sacred and used in the war against our own people,"

Ebrahimi condemned the attack and even gave a speech about it to the university students. Ten days after however, he was kidnapped from his house by some of the same people he used to work with, and spent eight months in prison. During this imprisonment, Ebrahimi says he was "physically and psychologically tortured", kept in solitary confinement in "a small coffin-sized cell", and left with injuries including a broken chin and rib. According to him, his interrogators tried to force him to confess "to having received orders from key reformist figures".

After his release from jail in 2000, he sought justice against his torturers and approached human rights lawyer Shirin Ebadi. In March 2000, Ebadi reported that Ebrahimi appeared at her office claiming to have

firsthand information about his comrades who had carried out the attack on the dormitory. He said he belonged to … Ansar-e Hezbollah … and that the group's chief had thrown him in prison for trying to resign from his unit.

Ebadi made a videotape of Ebrahimi confession in which he claimed that not only had his group been involved in the attack on the dormitory where Ebrahim-Nejad was killed, but that "During the time he was active in the group, he had also been involved in violent attacks on two reformist ministers" in president Khatami's cabinet. Ebrahimi alleged "that prominent conservative figures supported the activities of violent right-wing vigilante groups".

Hardline newspapers reported the existence of the confession, which they called the "Tape makers" case. In a number of inflammatory stories, they claimed Ebrahimi was mentally unstable and that Ebadi and another lawyer Rohami had manipulated him into testifying, and in any case confession blemished the Islamic revolution. Circa 29 September 2000, Ebadi and Rohami were sentenced to five years in jail and suspension of their law licenses for sending Ebrahimi's videotaped deposition to President Khatami. Ebarahimi was sentenced to 48 months jail, including 16 months in solitary confinement.

=== Exile ===
After being released from prison, Ebrahimi says he received death threats, and in 2003, after being targeted by an assassination attempt, was finally forced to leave Iran. Ebrahimi went first to Turkey, where according to him he was taken into custody by Turkish security forces and interrogated by the Iranian secret service who threatened to bring him back to Iran. On March 27, 2008, wire services reported that he was in danger of extradition from Turkey to Iran, on charges that he "collaborated with peace activists in the flight of Ali Reza Asgari from Iran." He left Turkey to come to Germany and in 2009 was identifying members of plain-clothed men who beat up Iranian protesters following the disputed 12 June 2009 election. Ebrahimi "names and shames those he recognizes on the Web", publishing their names and phone numbers and sometimes even their addresses on his blog, "so people in their neighborhood know what they are doing." Some are Ansar-e Hezbollah members and former friends.

As of 2023, Ebrahimi had a channel on YouTube with 2760 subscribers and 221 videos, billing himself as "freelance broadcast photo journalist and blogger".

== See also ==
- Ansar-e Hezbollah
