= Vigilantes in Iran =

Pro-Islamic Republic plainclothesmen

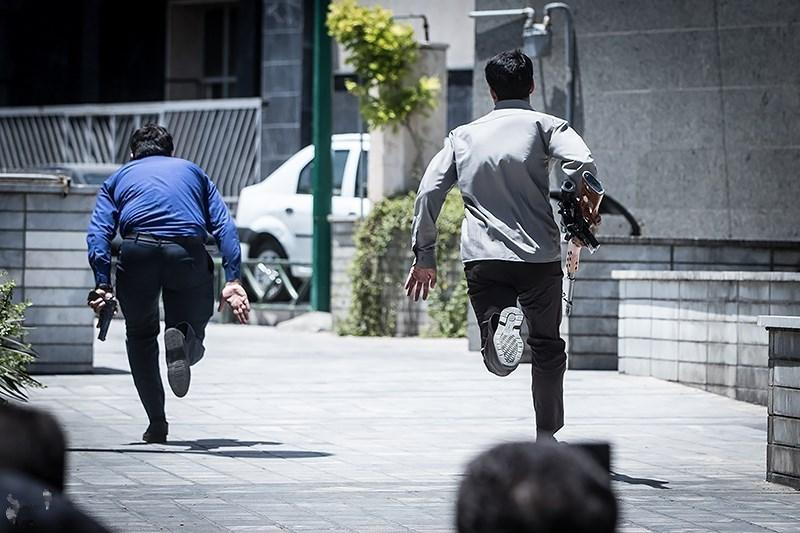
Vigilantes during 2017 ISIL-led attacks on Tehran

Vigilantes or Plainclothesmen (Persian: لباس شخصی; Lebas-shakhsi) in the Islamic Republic of Iran have been called "a prominent part" of the "crackdowns" by the regime on the repeated political protests during the twenty first century in Iran. Men wearing street clothes who appear to be unexceptional civilians but beat protesters, have been called "arguably the most feared and hated" of the forces deployed by the government against protesters.

Vigilantes/plainclothesmen have been described as a "third" strand in Iran's political system (the first being the formal government of president, parliament, etc., and the second being the "revolutionary institutions" of the Supreme Leader, etc.); and as operatives in "an informal but highly organized network of volunteers" that are a "powerful tool" for suppressing dissent with "both a strong ideological and financial interest in maintaining the status quo in Iran".

Attacks by the vigilantes are often in tandem with police. While often more brutal than the police, they are putatively pious civilians outraged at the godlessness of the protestors and spontaneously taking action, attacking protesters before police, and then melting away "as quickly as they appeared" when police arrive.

Plainclothes attackers may also be from security agencies (who do not identify themselves), rather than civilian vigilantes. For these attackers, plainclothes dress has the advantage of anonymity, leaving protesters and public guessing who is beating and shooting demonstrators, and when public anger over brutality escalates, allowing the government to plausibly deny responsibility, maintaining vigilantes were at fault. However, as their attacks become systematic and the police are seen to invariably stand aside during the beatings, plainclothes action undermines the government's line that they are upholding law and order, and can even lead to public doubt about the legitimacy of legal structure of the state in general.

Vigilantes/plainclothesmen are often members of Iranian "pressure groups" (guruh-i fishar) such as the Ansar-e Hezbollah (the "semi-official quasi-clandestine organization of a paramilitary character that performs vigilante duties"). Other sources state that they come primarily from the Basij (Iran International); or from the ranks of both the Basij and Islamic Revolutionary Guard Corps (RFERL); or "could be affiliated with" any of the many Iranian military and intelligence organizations; or that there are two sorts of attackers in plainclothes -- "plainclothes" who are affiliated with intelligence and military organizations, and civilian "volunteers" who are vigilantes (Maryam Sinaee of Iran International). (Note: "Plainclothes forces who could be affiliated with any of the many intelligence and military organizations have often been seen working in tandem with pro-government vigilantes".)

== Selected incidents ==
On 9 July 1999 students of Tehran University staged a peaceful demonstration against the closure of the reformist newspaper, Salam, by the Iranian press court. That evening, "about 400 plainclothes paramilitaries descended on a university dormitory, whispering into short-wave radios and wielding green sticks." The paramilitaries, thought to be Ansar-e-Hezbollah and Basij, began attacking students, kicking down doors and smashing through halls, grabbing female students by the hair and setting fire to rooms. Several students were thrown off of third story balconies "onto pavement below, their bones crushed," and one student paralyzed. According to students' accounts, uniformed police stood by and did nothing. (Note: Iranian police fall under the jurisdiction of the Iranian Armed Forces, which fall under the jurisdiction of the Supreme Leader, rather than the President, Minister of Defense, or Parliament.) "Witnesses reported that at least one student was killed, 300 wounded, and thousands detained in the days that followed."

During the 2009 protests over irregularities in the presidential election, a blog website (Lebasshakhs) was set up to attempt to identify plainclothes by posting photos of them giving readers the chance to recognize them and send in photos of the perpetrators in daily life to expose them. Crowds of demonstrators were so large during that protest movement that IRGC General Hossein Hamadani told reporters he resorted to using convicted violent criminals to control dissent (who could not be accurately called vigilantes but neither could they be called uniformed):

“We had identified and monitored 5,000 violent criminals and, at first, ordered all of them to stay at home when there was any protest. But later I thought: why not employ these thugs? So I organized them in three regiments to engage with the protesters on our behalf. They proved me right … if we want to train Mujahids [holy warriors], we need these types of violent people who are not afraid of a few drops of blood.”

In 2014, a concert by a traditional Iranian singer, Vahid Taj, was disrupted and shut down by several dozen vigilantes who alleged that Taj was "promoting sedition". Police guarding the event did nothing to stop the disruption, despite the fact that the singer "was fully vetted and the concert state-sanctioned".

In October 2014, conservatives in the Iranian parliament voted to place volunteer groups that “promote virtue and prevent vice” on the street, under the jurisdiction of the Basij, paramilitary units who are in turn controlled by the Islamic Revolutionary Guard Corps of Iran. According to Ehsan Mehrabi, the exiled Iranian journalist, this was part of an effort by “radical parliamentarians ... to empower the vigilantes.”

In a 7 June 2017 speech, Supreme Leader Ayatollah Ali Khamenei told listeners,

“Sometimes key think tanks and cultural and political institutions fall into disarray and stagnation, and when that happens, commanders of the soft war [against Western encroachment] should recognize their duty, make decisions and act in a fire at will manner”.

This was "widely interpreted" (according to Radio Farda) as an invitation to his supporters to attack the non-hardline government of Hassan Rouhani. Journalist Azadeh Moaveni describes permission to fire at will, (atash be-ekhtiyar), as "extrajudicial powers" given by the government to supporters. In March 2019 vigilante/plainclothes (working together with morality police) were said to have aggressively confronted or attacked women (insulting and threatening them) who had defied the compulsory hijab laws of the Islamic Republic, in the name of defending “public decency”.

Several years later in 2023, during the Mahsa Amini protests, when vigilantes were again active against protesters, Moaveni tells of a video circulated online of "a chador-wearing woman" in Ramsar threatening "naked" (i.e. bare-headed) women in violation of compulsory hijab that, "if the state didn’t act, 'we will fire at will'". Moaveni writes that as of mid-2023, vigilantism was said to be "on the rise" with reports of "armed men on motorbikes roamed the streets" in the city of Rasht, ordering unveiled women to cover up.

== Operation ==
Vigilantes are usually called into action not by a direct order or request but by a hard-line Islamic cleric who the vigilantes follow. After a protest begins against some incident (a suspicious election result, economic suffering, deaths of protesters), the cleric will declare (often quietly but sometimes not) that the protest is in some way "against God". One example is a 27 June 2009 declaration by Ayatollah Ahmad Khatami (who is also a senior government official) during the Friday Prayer sermon at Tehran University that protestors taking part in “destructive acts” were muharib, or enemies of God, and that “Islam says that muharib should receive the severest of punishments.” Statements like these by "like-minded clerics" send vigilantes "into the streets armed with clubs, knives, and pistols".

According to a former member of Ansar-e Hezbollah, Amir Farshad Ebrahimi, (who fled Iran to Germany after being jailed and tortured for denouncing Ansar-e Hezbollah attacks), most "the plainclothes agents" have been trained in special courses called "velayat" at mosques and schools. These courses teach the doctrine of Velâyat-e Faqih (Guardianship of the Islamic Jurist, i.e. that an Islamic state must be ruled by an Islamic jurist), instructing students in "Islam and politics as interpreted by hard-line clerics" such as Ayatollah Taqi Mesbah Yazdi.

According to Ebrahimi, agents also belong to networks whose connections benefit them. "Senior members" of the network will request favors from government officials for less well connected members. An example being where a senior member will confirm that someone is a member of Ansar-e Hezbollah and also has a travel agency selling plane tickets. The senior member will tell government officials "this guy is one of us and please support him,” by overlooking his tax bill or other favors.

As plainclothes do not wear uniforms they at least sometimes wear something to signal their identity to each other. Protesters have noticed anti-protesters wearing "certain clothing items and accessories such as baseball caps or crossbody sling bags and shirt tails draped over their trousers or even two watches, one on each wrist".

According to Tara Kangarlou of Time magazine, despite being "extremely powerful in force", the core base of support of the regime from which vigilantes come is "relatively small in number" (she estimates only 10% of the population), who are supplemented by individuals with less idealistic motives, such as offenders/convicts who have their sentences reduced by joining the network, or those interested some of the lucrative business deals available to insiders.
