= Amir Majd =

First commander of the Basij force

- امیر مجد
- Born: Pahlavi Iran
- Military career
- Allegiance: Iran
- Branch: IRGC
- Service years: 1979–1981
- Commands: Basij (1979–1981)
- Conflicts: Iran–Iraq War

Amir Majd (Persian: امیر مجد) was the first commander of the Basij force, appointed by Abolhassan Banisadr, the then president of Iran. He served in that position from December 1979 to December 1981. He was one of the forces affiliated with the first government of the Islamic Republic of Iran. According to Mohammad-Ali Rahmani, one of the Basij commanders, Majd turned to the People's Mojahedin Organization of Iran. Majd was dismissed from the command of the Basij and even ordered to be arrested, but he later fled to Mashhad and then abroad.
