= Yalasarat =

Iranian newspaper

- Type: Weekly newspaper
- Format: Broadsheet
- Owner: Ansar-e Hezbollah
- Editor-in-chief: Abdolhamid Mohtasham
- Launched: May 20, 1994; 31 years ago
- Political alignment: Radical right
- Language: Persian
- City: Tehran
- Country: Iran
- Website: yalasarat.ir

Yalasarat al-Hussein (Arabic: یا لثارات الحسین "Those Who Want to Avenge the Blood of Hussein") simply known as Yalasarat, is a Persian language weekly newspaper and news website serving as the official media outlet of Ansar-e Hezbollah.

== See also ==
- List of newspapers in Iran
