= Ansar-e Hezbollah =

Ansar-e Hezbollah انصار حزب‌الله
- General Secretary: Abdolhamid Mohtasham
- Coordination head: Hossein Allahkaram
- Mashhad leader: Hamid Ostad
- Kermanshah leader: Sadegh Ashk-Talkh
- Tabriz leader: Ruhollah Bejani
- Isfahan leader: Komeyl Kaveh
- Founded: 1990, 1993 or 1995
- Headquarters: Tehran
- Newspaper: Yalasarat
- Ideology: Islamism; Khomeinism; Islamic fundamentalism; Social conservatism; Anti-Zionism; Anti-liberalism; Anti-Western
- Religion: Shi'a Islam
- Slogan: Arabic: فَإِنَّ حِزْبَ ٱللَّهِ هُمُ ٱلْغَالِبُونَ "Verily the Party of God are they that shall be triumphant" ^{[Quran 5:56]}

Ansar-e Hezbollah (Persian: انصار حزب‌الله, lit. 'Supporters of the Party of God') is a conservative paramilitary organization in Iran. According to the Columbia World Dictionary of Islamism, it is a "semi-official quasi-clandestine organization of a paramilitary character that performs vigilante duties".

Hossein Allahkaram, one of the organization's known leaders has described it as "groups of young war veterans who, based on their revolutionary-Islamic duty, claim to be carrying out the Imam's will and rectifying existing shortcomings in Iran".

In 2018, the group was targeted with sanctions by the US for its involvement "in the violent suppression of Iranian citizens" and for working with the Basij carrying out attacks on student protesters using "knives, tear gas and electric batons".

== Origin and status ==
Ansar-e Hizbullah, or Followers of the Party of God or more literally Helpers of Hizbullah in Persian, is said to be a semi-official, paramilitary group formed in 1995. Unlike some other paramilitary groups, Ansar-e Hizbullah undergoes formal training.

It is thought to be financed and protected by many senior government clerics. It is often characterized as a vigilante group as they use force but are not part of government law enforcement, although it may not meet the strict definition of the word inasmuch as the group pledge loyalty to the Supreme Leader of Iran Ali Khamenei and is thought to be protected by him.

It has been described as an "offshoot" or "vigilante associate" of the Iranian Hezbollah, a loose-knit movement of groups formed at the time of the Iranian Revolution to assist the Ayatollah Khomeini and his forces in consolidating power.

=== Membership ===
Most of the members of Ansar e Hezbollah are either members of the Basij militias or veterans of the Iran–Iraq War.

== Ideology ==
The organization is described as Khomeinist and composed of poorer classes of the Iranian society. It advocates the pricinple of the "permanent revolution", which regards the Iranian Revolution as incomplete and seeks to realize the principles of revolutionary Islam in Iran. It adheres to the principle of ‘enjoining good and forbidding wrong’ which derives from Quran, and justifies its actions by the need of combatting immoral and un-Islamic activities. Ansar-e Hezbollah also advocates the pricinple of the Guardianship of the Islamic Jurist, by which it argues that the political legitimacy of the Supreme Leader of Iran derives from his religious credential and position as an Islamic jurists. The organization is anti-Western, arguing that the West seeks to undermine Iran by military invasion, as well as a 'cultural invasion' and soft power imperialism. Despite its conservative orientation, it is critical of the Iranian right-wing politicians, attacking the old guard as "the right-wing monopolists".

== Hierarchy ==
General Secretary Abdolhamid Mohtasham is a key figure known for his enforcement of Islamic values and alignment with conservative factions, making him a significant influence in Iran's political landscape.

Hossein Allahkaram, serving as the coordination head of Ansar-e Hezbollah, is a prominent figure within the organization. A former Revolutionary Guard Brigadier General, Allahkaram has been instrumental in the group's activities, which include enforcing Islamic codes. His close ties to factions within the Iranian government have enabled Ansar-e Hezbollah to operate with significant influence and impunity, despite its controversial methods.

Hamid Ostad is a key figure within Ansar-e Hezbollah, leading the group in Mashhad and is recognised as the highest ranking figure out of the municipal leaders.

Sadegh Ashk-Talkh is a key figure within Ansar-e Hezbollah, leading the group in Kermanshah.

Ruhollah Bejani is a key figure within Ansar-e Hezbollah, leading the group in Tabriz.

Komeyl Kaveh is a key figure within Ansar-e Hezbollah, leading the group in Isfahan.

== Activities ==
The Ansar-e-Hezbollah is known for attacking protesters at anti-government demonstrations, in particular during the Iran student riots, July 1999. and is thought to have been behind public physical assaults on two reformist government ministers in Sept. 1998.

Ansar-e-Hezbollah is thought to have been behind death threats and a "series of physical assaults" on philosopher and ex-hardliner Abdolkarim Soroush "that left him bruised, battered and often in tattered clothes."

The organization has been associated with a crackdown on "mal-veiling", i.e. the wearing of a hejab by a woman such that some hair is visible, which has been blamed in Iran for inciting sexual assaults. They operate Yalasarat, a newspaper and associated website that explain the official positions of hardliners in the Iranian government on female behavior.

=== Attacking reformists ===
According to Golnaz Esfandiari of RFERL news agency,

Ansar-e Hizbullah was active in the so-called era of reforms in Iran in the late 1990s and early 2000s, during which its members would disrupt meetings by reformists and attack members of then-President Mohammad Khatami's cabinet. Hard-liners generally regard reformists as enemies of Islam and the revolution, and they frequently allege that such people are collaborating with foreign governments to destabilize Iran's clerically dominated establishment.

According to an ex-Ansar-e Hizbullah member, Amir Farshad Ebrahimi, orders to disrupt reformists' meetings or attack reformist politicians "came from above, including from senior conservative ayatollahs". Ansar-e Hizbullah was loyal to Supreme Leader Ayatollah Ali Khamenei, and his office provided backing for the group.

=== Ezzat Ebrahim-Nejad killing ===
A 2000 expose of Ansar-e Hezbollah involved the murder of Ezzat Ebrahim-Nejad. Ebrahim-Nejad was a university student and poet whose killing by "plain-clothesmen" following a peaceful protest over a newspaper closing was partially responsible for the destructive five-day-long Iran student riots in July 1999. In March 2000, human rights lawyer Shirin Ebadi reports a man by the name of Amir Farshad Ebrahimi appeared at her office claiming to have

firsthand information about his comrades who had carried out the attack on the dormitory. He said he belonged to … Ansar-e Hezbollah … and that the group's chief had thrown him in prison for trying to resign from his unit.

Ebadi made a videotape of Ebrahimi confession in which he claimed that not only had his group been involved in the attack on the dormitory where Ebrahim-Nejad was killed, but that "During the time he was active in the group, he had also been involved in violent attacks on two reformist ministers" in president Khatami's cabinet.

Hardline newspapers reported the existence of the confession, which they called the "Tape makers" case. In a number of inflammatory stories, they claimed Ebrahimi was mentally unstable and that Ebadi and another lawyer Rohami had manipulated him into testifying, and in any case confession blemished the Islamic revolution. Ebadi and Rohami were sentenced to five years in jail and suspension of their law licenses for sending Ebrahimi's videotaped deposition to President Khatami. Ebarahimi was sentenced to 48 months jail, including 16 months in solitary confinement.

=== 2009 Election Protests ===
On 18 June 2009, the Los Angeles Times newspaper reported that "hard-line Ansar-e Hezbollah militiamen warned that they would be patrolling the streets to maintain law and order."

== See also ==
- Hezbollah (Iran)
