= Hossein Allahkaram =

Iranian politician

Sardar Hossein Allahkaram
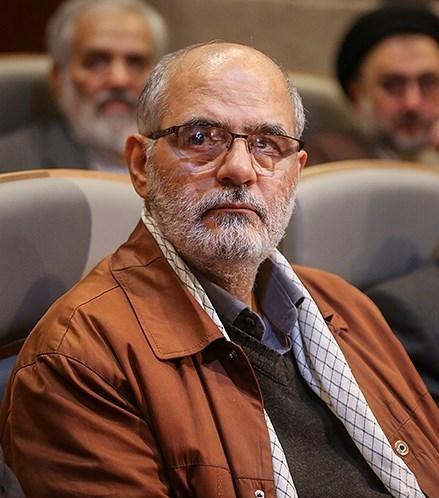
- Born: 20 June 1956 (age 70); Najafabad, Iran
- Education: Islamic Azad University
- Political party: Ansar-e-Hezbollah
- Military career
- Branch: Revolutionary Guards
- Rank: Brigadier general
- Conflicts: Iran–Iraq War

Hossein Allahkaram (Persian: حسین الله‌کرم) is an Iranian conservative activist, pundit and former military officer.

He is head of the coordination council of Ansar-e-Hezbollah and is described as its theoretician.

Following Allahkaram’s Ansar-e-Hezbollah’s attacks on women using acid as well as against students with tear gas, electric batons and knives, Allahkaram as well as co-founder Abdolhamid Mohtasham were sanctioned by the United States Department of the Treasury. Allahkaram is also under EU sanctions.

== Military career ==
A veteran of Iran–Iraq War, he was reported continuing to serve in the Revolutionary Guards as of 2001. According to some sources, he commanded the Quds Force in the Bosnian War along with Mohammad Reza Naqdi.

Party political offices
| New title | Head of Coordination Council of Ansar-e-Hezbollah; 1990–present | Incumbent |
