= Haydaryan =

Iranian security force

Haydaryan is an Iranian security force established in 2009 by Ayatollah Ali Khamenei as a small, elite militia dedicated to preserving the Islamic Republic's Supreme Leader.
