= Hezbollah (Iran) =

Iranian political and militant organization

Hezbollah (Persian: حزب‌الله, romanized: Ḥezbo'llāh, lit. 'Party of God') is an Iranian movement formed at the time of the Iranian Revolution to assist the Ayatollah Ruhollah Khomeini and his forces in consolidating power, initially by attacking demonstrations and offices of newspapers that were critical of Khomeini. References in the media or writing are usually made to members of the group—or Hezbollahi—rather than Hezbollah, as Hezbollah at the time was not a tightly structured independent organisation, but more a movement of loosely bound groups, usually centered on a mosque.

Hezbollahi are said to "generally act without meaningful police restraint or fear of persecution," despite breaking the law by assaulting people and destroying property. They are said to have "played an important role on the street at crucial moments in the early days of the revolution by confronting those the regime regarded as counter-revolutionaries."

Once political challenges to the regime had died down, Hezbollah attacks expanded to include a wide variety of activities found to be undesirable for "moral" or "cultural" reasons, such as poor hijab, mixing of the sexes and consumption of alcohol.

== History and activities ==
According to scholar Moojan Momen, the association between toughs and clerics became common during the era of weak government of the Qajar period, when "it became normal for the prominent" members of the ulama in any town "to surround themselves with a band of the town's ruffians, known as lutis, to their mutual benefit". The ulama had "a ready band" to take to the street to oppose what the ulama opposed, while "the lutis in turn had a protector with whom they could take refuge if the government moved against them." The Hezbollahi which appeared after the Islamic revolution, according to Momen, were "in fact only a new name for the street roughs who had always had a close relationship with the ulama", "who would take to the street and create agitation when it suited the ulama to call them out."

The name Hezbollah, or party of Allah, is generic, coming from the rallying cry used by its "members": "Only one party—of Allah; only one leader—Ruhollah." The phrase party of Allah came from a verse in the Quran ...

And whoever takes Allah and His apostle and those who believe for a guardian, then surely the party of Allah are they that shall be triumphant.

^{[Quran 5:56]} (italics added)

... and Ruhollah was the first name of the Islamic Revolution's leader Ayatollah Ruhollah Khomeini

In the early days of the Revolution, Khomeinists — those in the Islamic Republican Party — denied connection to Hezbollah, and maintaining its attacks were the spontaneous will of the people over which the government had no control.

The Hezbollahi is a wild torrent surpassing the imagination. He is a maktabi [one who follows Islam comprehensively], disgusted with any leaning to the East or West. He has a pocketful of documents exposing the treason of those who pose as intellectuals. He is simple, sincere and angry. Stay away from his anger, which destroys all in its path. Khomeini is his heart and soul . ... The Hezbollahi does not use eau de cologne, wear a tie or smoke American cigarettes. ... You might wonder where he gets his information. He is everywhere, serving your food, selling you ice-cream.

In fact, the Islamic Republican forces did supervise Hezbollah. Hojjat al-Islam Hadi Ghaffari, "a young protegee of Khomeini," being in charge of them.

Hezbollah was instrumental in the Islamic Cultural Revolution against secularists and modernists at Iran's universities.

After Friday prayers on 18 April 1980, Khomeini harshly attacked the universities. `We are not afraid of economic sanctions or military intervention. What we are afraid of is Western universities and the training of our youth in the interests of West or East.` His remarks served as a signal for an attack that evening on the Tehran Teachers Training College. One student was reportedly lynched, and according to a British correspondent, the campus was left looking like `a combat zone.` The next day, hezbollahis ransacked left-wing student offices at Shiraz University. Some 300 students required hospital treatment. Attacks on student groups also took place at Mashad and Isfahan Universities"` Attacks continued April 21 and "the next day at the Universities at Ahwaz and Rasht. Over 20 people lost their lives in these university confrontations. ... The universities closed soon after the April confrontation for Islamization`. They were not to open for another two years."

== Appearance ==
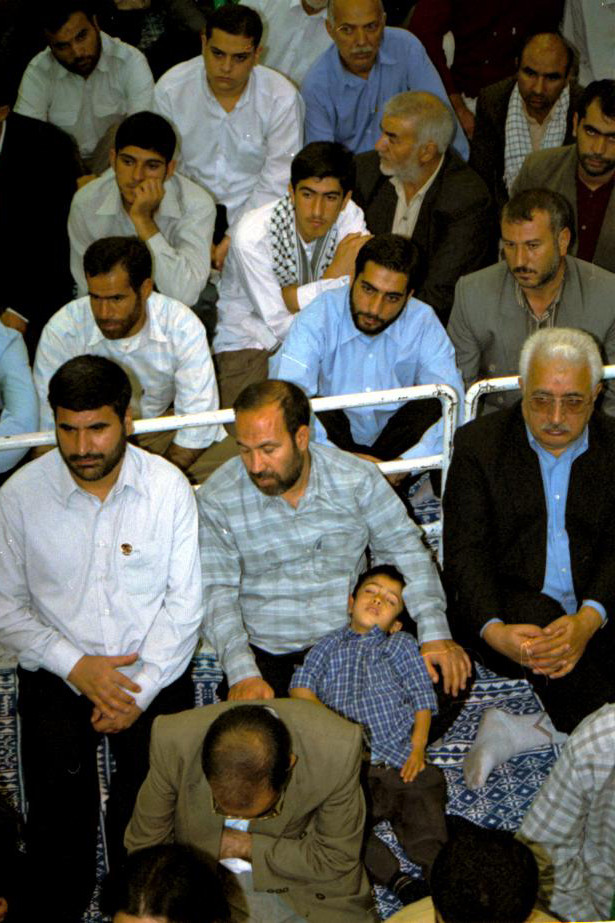
People meeting with Ali Khamenei in 2001

The Hezbollahi do not wear uniforms, but are said to be recognizable to Iranians by a familiar "look" that ignores fashion and in particular Western fashion. Hezbollahi favor simple, non-fashionable, collared shirts that are never tucked into their pants; plain slacks (never jeans), and plain black shoes or slippers. A black and white Palestinian-style chafiye is commonly worn. A beard or three-day growth is almost always worn.

== See also ==
- Islamic Republican Party
- Ansar-e Hezbollah
- Basij
- Islamic Revolutionary Guard Corps
- Islamic Revolutionary Committees
