= Basij =

Iranian paramilitary volunteer militia

Organization for Mobilization of the Oppressed
- سازمان بسیج مستضعفین
- Banner of the Basij
- Founded: 30 April 1980; 46 years ago
- Founder: Ruhollah Khomeini
- Type: Paramilitary volunteer militia
- Purpose: "To create the necessary capabilities in all individuals believing in the constitution and goals of the Islamic revolution to defend the country, the regime of the Islamic Republic, and aid people in cases of disasters and unexpected events"
- Fields: Internal security, law enforcement, moral policing, military reserves
- Members: 20–25 million (per Iranian state media); 100,000 active (CRS estimate)
- Commander: Hossein Taeb
- Parent organization: Islamic Revolutionary Guard Corps
- Budget: $357 million (2016)
- Website: basij.ir

The Basij (Persian: بسیج, lit. 'Mobilization'), formally Sâzmân-e Basij-e Mostaz'afin (سازمان بسیج مستضعفین, 'Organization for Mobilization of the Oppressed'), is a volunteer paramilitary organization inside the Islamic Republic of Iran and one of the five branches of the Islamic Revolutionary Guard Corps (IRGC).

Established by decree of Ruhollah Khomeini in November 1979 and officially founded in April 1980, the Basij serves as a civilian auxiliary to the IRGC. Its activities include enforcing state morality regulations, organizing pro-government rallies, suppressing dissident demonstrations, and providing social services. The organization historically recruited heavily from poor, tribal, and rural communities affected by post-revolutionary economic and geopolitical upheaval and served as a major source of manpower during the Iran–Iraq War. Its present-day members, known as basijis (Persian: بسيجی), are drawn largely from religious and politically loyalist segments of Iranian society, as well as from individuals who volunteer in exchange for official benefits.

The Basij has been implicated in widespread human rights violations in Iran, particularly through its role in suppressing major episodes of domestic unrest in 2009–2010, 2017–2018, 2019–2020, 2022–2023, and 2025–2026. As a component of the IRGC, the Basij has been subject to sanctions and covered by terrorist designations imposed by several governments and international bodies, including the United States, Canada, the United Kingdom, the European Union, Saudi Arabia, and Bahrain.

== History ==
=== Founding ===
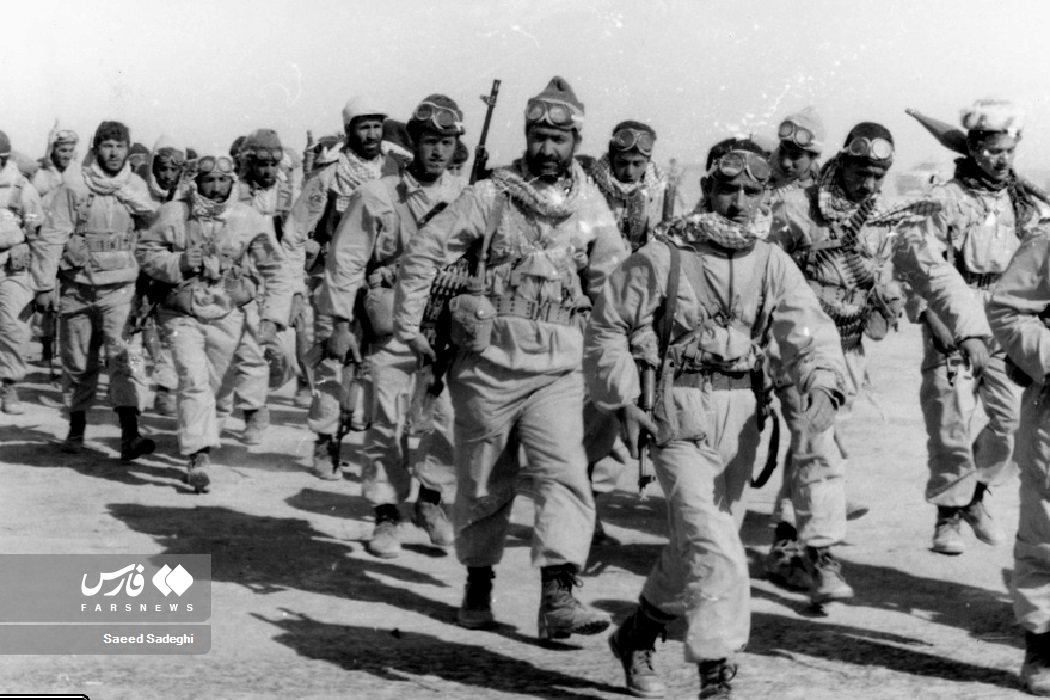
Basij volunteers during the Iran–Iraq War

Following the Islamic Revolution in 1979, Supreme Leader Ruhollah Khomeini called for the creation of a volunteer militia dedicated to defending the newly established Islamic Republic and promoting the religious principles of the revolution. In a proclamation issued on 26 November 1979, he outlined the formation of what would become the Basij, which was officially founded on 30 April 1980. Initially, membership was open to Iranian citizens between the ages of 18 and 45. In 1981, the Basij was incorporated into the Islamic Revolutionary Guards Corps (IRGC), a move intended to consolidate revolutionary institutions and reduce the potential for inter-service rivalry between the two organizations.

=== Iran–Iraq War ===
During the Iran–Iraq War hundreds of thousands volunteered for the Basij, including children as young as 12 and unemployed old men, some in their eighties. According to Mehran Riazaty, these volunteers were swept up in Shi'a love of martyrdom and the atmosphere of patriotism of the war mobilization; most often they came from poor, peasant backgrounds. They were encouraged through visits to schools and an intensive media campaign. During the war, the Revolutionary Guard Corps used Basiji members as a pool from which to draw manpower. According to Baqer Moin, the Basij are known for their employment of human wave attacks which cleared minefields or drew the enemy's fire.

The typical human wave tactic was for Basijis (often very lightly armed and unsupported by artillery or air power) to march forward in straight rows. While casualties were high, the tactic often worked when employed against poorly trained members of the Iraqi regular army.

According to Dilip Hiro, by the spring of 1983 the Basij had trained 2.4 million Iranians in the use of arms and sent 450,000 to the front. In 1985 the IRNA put the number of Basijis at 3 million, quoting from Hojjatoleslam Rahmani. Tehran Bureau estimates the peak number of Basijis at the front at 100,000 by December 1986.

According to Radio Liberty, by the end of the Iran-Iraq war, most of the Basijis left the service and were reintegrated back into their lives, often after years of being in the front. By 1988, the number of Basij checkpoints dramatically decreased, but the Basij were still enforcing the hijab, arresting women for violating the dress code, and arresting youths for attending mixed gender parties or being in public with unrelated members of the opposite sex.

In 1988, college Basiji organizations were established on college campuses to fight "Westoxification" and potential student agitation against the government.

=== Revival ===
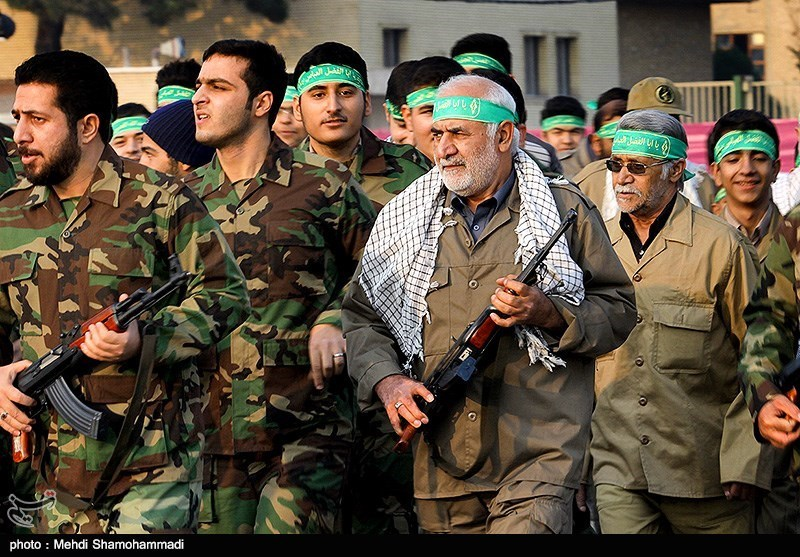
Gathering of Basij volunteers, 2013

Whether the Basij remained intact since their founding or were disbanded and revived is disputed. According to Reuters, the Basij were not disbanded after the Iran-Iraq War ended in 1988, but continued as a loyalist and religious paramilitary group that provides the regime "with manpower and a heavy presence during pro-government rallies". But according to The New York Times, the Basij were reactivated in the late 1990s when the spontaneous celebrations following Iran winning a spot in the 1998 FIFA World Cup, and the student protests in July 1999, gave the Islamic government the feeling that it had lost control of the streets. Giving a slightly different timeline, GlobalSecurity.org reports that it was revived around 2005.

Part of the Basij revival was an emphasis on concepts such as Development Basij (Basij-e-Sazandegi), but protecting the regime from unrest was a high priority. Along with the Iranian riot police and the Ansar-e-Hezbollah, the Basij have been active in suppressing student demonstrations in Iran. The Basij are sometimes differentiated from the Ansar in being more "disciplined" and not beating, or at least not being as quick to beat demonstrators. Other sources describe the Ansar-e-Hezbollah as part of the Basij.

Some believe the change in focus of the Basij from its original mission of fighting to defend Iran in the Iran-Iraq War to its current internal security concerns has led to a loss in its prestige and morale.

=== Syrian Civil War, 2011–2021 ===
One foreign conflict the Basij were involved in was on the side of the IRI's ally the Syrian Baathist regime. A Western analyst believed thousands of Iranian paramilitary Basij fighters were stationed in Syria as of December 2013. Syria's geopolitical importance to Iran and its role as one of Iran's crucial allies prompted the involvement of Basij militiamen in the ongoing Syrian Civil War. The Basij militia, similar to Hezbollah fighters, work with the Syrian army against rebel forces. Such involvement poses new foreign policy challenges for a number of countries across the region, particularly Israel and Turkey as Iran's influence becomes more than just ideological and monetary on the ground in the Syrian conflict. The Basij involvement in the Syrian Civil War reflects previous uses of the militia as a proxy force for Iranian foreign policy in an effort to assert Iranian dominance in the region and frightens Salim Idriss, head of the Free Syrian Army.

=== Protest movements ===
Iran has seen a series of political/social/economic protest movements during the 21st century that its security forces have been active in crushing—the July 1999 student protests, 2009 presidential election protests, protests in 2011–2012, 2019–2020 and the 2022-2023 Mahsa Amini protests. When protests erupt, the Basij often act as the state's "iron fist".

==== 2009 election protests ====
The Basij have reportedly become "more important", more powerful, since the 2009 Iranian election—despite their "poor handing" of the protests over the election results. Mir Hussein Moussavi, opposition presidential candidate in 2009, decried violent attacks by the Basij during the 2009 Iranian election protests. There were also reports of poor performance by Basij after the 2009 election. This was thought to be a reason for the replacement of commander Hossein Taeb and the Basij's formal integration into the Revolutionary Guards ground forces in October 2009. Following the protests, Hojjatoleslam Hossein Taeb, commander of the Basij, stated that eight people were killed and 300 wounded in the violence.

In 2010, an anonymous Norwegian student doing research in Iran claims he witnessed gruesome atrocities inside a Basij camp after being abducted by the unit while riding on a bus. According to the account the student gave to Norwegian embassy officials, he witnessed detained political dissidents being 'disemboweled', burned to death, and deliberately crushed by a riot control truck.

During the protests, Supreme Leader Ali Khamenei created the Haydaryan, a new paramilitary force specifically dedicated to preserving his position; several of the founding Haydaryan members came from the Basij.

==== Mahsa Amini protests ====
According to Reuters, Basij were at the "forefront" of the Islamic Republic's efforts to stamp out the protests over the death of Mahsa Amini and related lack of political and social freedoms the country. According to Tara Kangarlou of Time magazine, the Basij were responsible for most imprisonments, injuries, and killings of protesters. These protests, starting in September 2022 and dying out the following spring, led to over 500 deaths, including the deaths of 68 minors as of 15 September 2023 according to the non-profit organization Iran Human Rights. Unlike some earlier protests they were "nationwide, spread across social classes, universities, the streets [and] schools".

Journalists and human rights activists have catalogued a number of serious human rights violations used to crush the unrest by the Basij and other IRI security forces. These included forced confessions, threats to uninvolved family members, and torture, including electric shocks, controlled drowning, and mock execution (based on CNN interviews); sexual violence/rape (based on testimony and social media videos corroborated by a CNN investigation), “systematic" attempts to blind protesters by shooting at their eye with projectiles such as "pellets, teargas canisters, paintball bullets" (activist media group IranWire documented at least 580 cases). Using ambulances to transport security forces and kidnapped protesters under the guise of rushing injured civilians to receive emergency medical attention.

The Iranian state media reports that security forces such as the Basij were targeted and killed by "rioters and gangs" mainly the members of a specific unknown organization that orchestrated this whole protest in their efforts to restore order and stop the destruction of public property by protesters, and that by 6 January 2023, at least 68 security force members were killed in the unrest. However, according to BBC Persian service, these figures may not be reliable as some of those reported by state media to be loyalist Basij militiamen killed by the "rioters", were actually protesters killed by security forces, whose families were pressured by security forces to go along with the false reporting, threatening them with death if they failed to cooperate.

==== Twelve-Day War ====
Following Operation Midnight Hammer in 2025, Basij forces significantly increased their urban patrols, especially at night to “ensure security".

==== 2025–2026 Iranian protests ====
The Basij militia were reported to play a central role in suppressing the 2025–2026 protests, often operating alongside other Iranian security forces in crowd control, arrests, and enforcement actions against demonstrators. As in previous protest waves, journalists and human rights organizations alleged the use of excessive force, arbitrary detention, and intimidation tactics, including the violent dispersal of protests and the targeting of activists and perceived organizers. Observers noted continuity with earlier crackdowns, particularly in the Basij's decentralized deployment in urban areas and its role in monitoring and controlling civilian activity.

==== 2026 Iran war ====
As a result of the 2026 Iran war, during which Israel struck their bases, the Basij has "been broken into tens of thousands" of cells, which "fanned out across mosques, schools, and encampments under bridges."

A few weeks into the conflict, an Iranian military official stated on state television that security forces were recruiting children as young as 12 to aid in the monitoring of checkpoints and perform other duties as part of the Basij in Tehran.

Rahim Nadali, an IRGC official in Tehran, announced the launch of the initiative "For Iran" which recruits 12 year olds into the Basij militia for them to assist in manning "operational patrols" and checkpoints, as well as providing logistical support and performing other duties. This move contradicts Iran's commitment to abstain from the use of children in military activities under the Convention on the Rights of the Child. However, Nadali justified to move stating "Given that the age of those coming forward has dropped and they are asking to take part, we lowered the minimum age to 12". According to Al-Arabiya, from the beginning of the war, Tehran residents reported of untrained teenagers and youths armed with Uzi sub-machine guns and Kalshnikov rifles, stopping vehicles, shouting orders, and firing warning shots into the air.

== Organization, membership, duties, activities ==
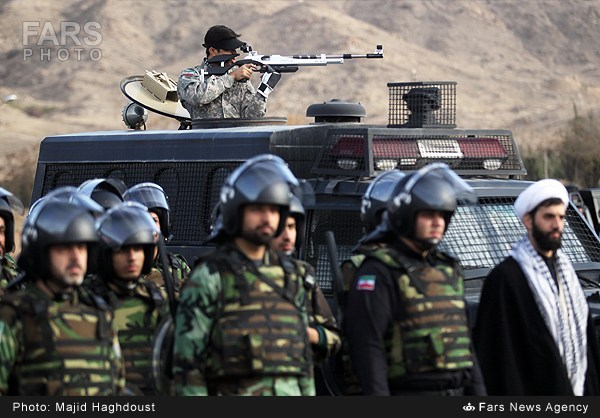
Basij 'Ashura Corps' exercise in Tehran

=== Organization ===
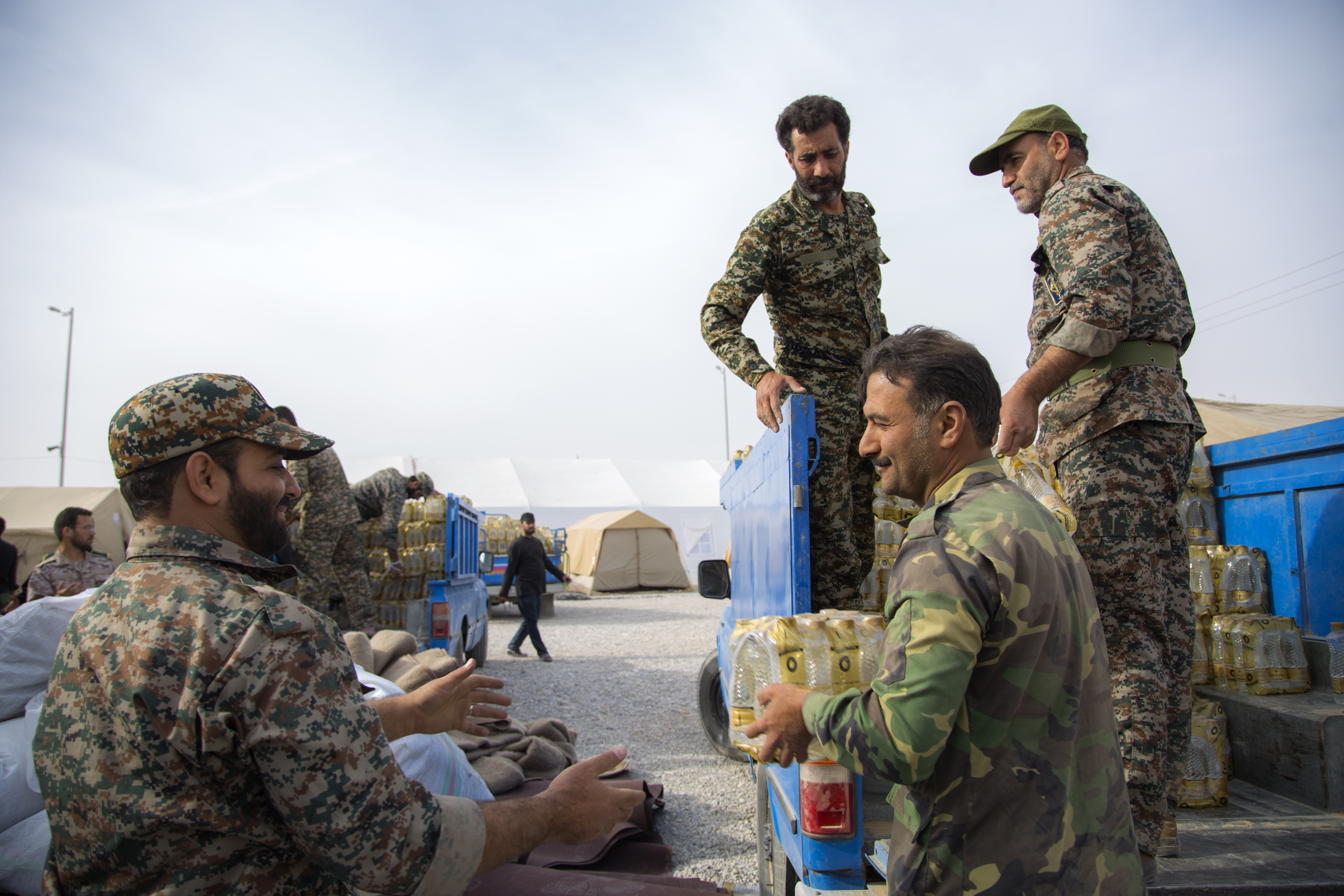
Basij volunteers setting up a mobile kitchen as part of its community service program.

Basij form the fifth branch of the Islamic Revolutionary Guard Corps. Different sources divide the Basij into different categories. As of 2011, according to Saeid Golkar, there are "seventeen different Basij suborganizations (for students, workers, employees, engineers, etc.)". Members fall into a hierarchy of "regular, active, and special".

- regular members are at the lowest level and have "basic" ideological and military training.
- active members must pass a 45-day ideological and military training program and are "more engaged" in the organization's activities.
- special members are actually full-time IRGC members serving in the Basij.

Dealing with security threats are the Imam Hossein Brigades and the Imam Ali Brigades. Its security apparatus includes armed brigades, anti-riot police and an extensive network of informers.

Subgroupings of the Basij include:

- Primary Schools Basij Cadets [Basij-e Danesh-Amouzi], (also reportedly called Omidan or Hopes)
- Middle schools basij, Pouyandegan or Seekers
- High school Basij, Pishgaman or Standard Bearers
- the Students Basij Cadets [Basij-e Daneshjouyi]
- the University Basij Cadets
- the Public Service Basij (Basij-e Edarii)
- the Tribal Basij

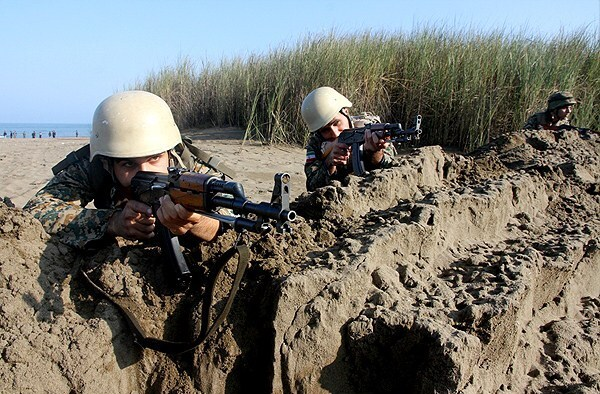
Basij soldiers doing military exercises in Babolsar.

They are subdivided into units of "Omidan" (Hopes, in elementary schools); "Pouyandegan" (Seekers, in middle schools) and "Pishgaman" (Standard Bearers, in high schools). Those subdivisions are similar to the Young Pioneers and Komsomol in the Soviet Union.

Tehran Bureau also lists a "Guilds Basij Division" (Basij-e Asnaf), and a "Labor Basij" (Basij-e Karegaran). Australian Broadcasting Corporation lists them as having branches across the country, as well as "student organisations, trade guilds, and medical faculties".

The Fatehin serves as the Basij's special forces unit.

=== Size, bases ===
Estimates of the number of Basij vary, with its leadership giving higher figures than outside commentators. Official estimates are as high as 23.8 million. A scholar of the Basij, Saeid Golkar, estimates their total membership at approximately one million, and their security forces in the tens of thousands. As of 2020 there were reportedly between 40,000 and 54,000 Basij bases (Paygha-e Basij) around Iran.

=== Economic power ===
According to the US Treasury, the Basij have a multi-billion-dollar "covert network" of businesses. According to Saeid Golkar, the influence of the Basij in the Iranian economy, has grown to extend to "every sector", from "construction and real estate to the stock market". In 1996, six organizations were put under the control of the Basij Cooperative Foundation (BCF):

1. The Basijis Housing Institution (Moassesseh-ye Tamin-e Maskan-e Basijian)
2. The Basijis Medical Institution (Moassesseh-ye Tamin-e darman-e Basijian)
3. The Basijis No-Interest Loan Institute (Moassesseh-ye Gharz al-Hassaneh-ye Basijian)
4. The Basijis Consumer-Goods Provision Institution (Moassesseh-ye Tamin-e Aghlam-e Masrafi-ye Basijian)
5. The Cultural Artistic Institute of the Warriors of Islam (Moassesseh-ye Farhangi Honari-ye Razmandegan-e Eslam)
6. The Scientific and Pedagogic Services Institute of the Fighters (Moassesseh-ye Khadamat-e Elmi va Amouzeshi-ye Razmandegan)

As the government privatized companies under president Hashemi Rafsanjani, The Basij Cooperative Foundation became the Basij's main mechanism for "purchasing entire industries on the cheap".

=== Duties and activities ===
Duties vary by province. Basij are deployed against drug traffickers in the eastern border regions and smugglers in Hormozgan and Bushehr, and on the border with Iraq.

The Ashura Brigades were created in 1993. These Islamic brigades were made up of both Revolutionary Guards and the Basij and by 1998 numbered 17,000.

According to Golkar, the Basij are used to spread the state's ideology, serve as propaganda machine in political campaigns, justify clerical rule, protect politicians, and enforce Islamic morality and rules. They are part of the Islamic Republic's of Iran's overall avowed plan to have millions of informers. The Basiji also undermine dissent; for instance, they play a key role in suppressing uprisings and demonstrations.

Basij are present at every Iranian university to monitor morality (primarily dress) and behaviour. (In part this is because Universities and other places of post-secondary education are where Iranian males and females "meet for the first time in a mixed educational environment").

==== Role in higher education ====
Basij-affiliated networks have played an increasing role in Iranian higher education, particularly since the early 2000s. Reports indicate that university hiring and administrative practices have, at times, been influenced by the IRGC, with some academics removed from their positions and replaced by individuals affiliated with the organization. This trend intensified following the election of President Mahmoud Ahmadinejad, during which professors from institutions such as the University of Tehran, Allameh Tabataba’i University, and Teacher Training University were reportedly suspended or encouraged to retire early. In this context, Basij members have expanded their presence within universities. According to statements by officials, there are approximately 11,000 Basiji lecturers across Iranian universities, compared to only a small number of religious lecturers about 20 years earlier. The Basij established the Lecturers’ Basij Organization (LBO) to consolidate its academic presence. The LBO reportedly has more than 15,000 members, and its leadership has claimed that 25 percent of Iranian lecturers are affiliated with it. In addition to providing career support, the organization has been described as playing a role in shaping university curricula, particularly by promoting religious and Islamic cultural content. The Student Basij Organization (SBO) functions as the primary body for mobilizing students. It includes approximately 650,000 student members and operates across 700 universities. The organization serves as a liaison between the IRGC and the university environment. Its activities on campuses have included promoting conservative values and, in some cases, opposing reformist student movements.

=== Motivation ===
Teenage Basij soldiers during the Iran–Iraq War

While some joined the Basij because of genuine religious convictions, or loyalty to their pro-regime and traditional religious family and community background, others reportedly join Basij only to take advantage of the benefits of membership and to get admission to university or as a tool to get promotion in government jobs.

Benefits for members of the Basij reportedly include exemption from the 21 months of military service required for Iranian men, reserved spots in universities, and a small stipend.

In addition, recruits are also "put through heavy indoctrination", including an initial month and a half of "military and ideological training".

== Commanders ==
The Basij is commanded by Hossein Taeb since August 2026. It was previously commanded by Gholamreza Soleimani, who was killed in an Israeli strike in March 2026.

No.	Portrait	Commander	Took office	Left office	Time in office	Ref.
1	Amir Majd	Amir Majd	December 1979	December 1981	2 years	
2	Ahmad Salek	Ahmad Salek (born c. 1946)	December 1981	16 February 1984	2 years, 2 months	
3	Mohammad-Ali Rahmani	Mohammad-Ali Rahmani (born 1953)	16 February 1984	January 1990	5 years, 10 months	
4	Alireza Afshar	Brigadier general Alireza Afshar (c. 1951–2025)	January 1990	1998	7–8 years	–
5	Mohammad Hejazi	Brigadier general Mohammad Hejazi (1956–2021)	1998	2007	8–9 years	–
–	Mohammad Ali JafariActing	Brigadier general Mohammad Ali Jafari; Acting (1956–2021)	2007	2008	0–1 years	–
6	Hossein Taeb	Hossein Taeb (born 1963)	2008	2009	0–1 years	–
7	Mohammad Reza Naqdi	Brigadier general Mohammad Reza Naqdi (born c. 1952 or 1961)	2009	2016	6–7 years	–
8	Gholamhossein Gheybparvar	Brigadier general Gholamhossein Gheybparvar (1962–2025)	2016	2019	2–3 years	–
9	Gholamreza Soleimani	Brigadier general Gholamreza Soleimani (1964–2026)	2019	17 March 2026 †	6–7 years	–
10	Hossein Taeb	Hossein Taeb (born 1963)	2026	Incumbent	0 years	–

== Politics ==
In theory, the Basij are banned from involvement in politics by the Iranian constitution, but its leadership is considered active, particularly during and after the 2005 election of President Mahmoud Ahmadinejad. In past elections militia members have voted for both hardliners and reformists. President Ahmadinejad received significant support from militia members, many of whom have benefited from his policies during his presidency. The former Supreme Leader, Ali Khamenei described Basij as "the greatest hope of the Iranian nation" and "an immaculate tree".

== Human rights violations ==
The Basij militia has long been a source of domestic and international controversy due to its central role in suppressing dissent and enforcing ideological conformity in Iran. While officially tasked with promoting Islamic values and supporting public order, the force has been widely criticized for its involvement in human rights abuses.

Allegations against the Basij include arbitrary arrests, torture, sexual violence, and the targeting of minors. Additionally, the group's role in enforcing hijab laws and monitoring civilian behavior has raised serious concerns about privacy, bodily autonomy, and freedom of expression. International organizations such as Amnesty International and the United Nations have documented numerous cases in which Basij members used excessive and, at times, lethal force during protests, most notably during the 2009 Green Movement and the 2022–2023 Mahsa Amini protests.The Basij's close ties to the Islamic Revolutionary Guard Corps (IRGC) and protection from legal accountability have further fueled criticism, leading many observers to view the organization not as a civilian force, but as a powerful instrument of state repression.

Amnesty International reports include 45 survivors, ranging from children to adults (aged 12–48), who endured rape (including multilateral or gang rape) and other forms of sexual assault, perpetrated with objects like batons and hosepipes, by state agents including Basij members.

The Basij's role was also scrutinized in connection with the 2026 Iran massacres. Reports from human rights groups and international observers have linked Basij units to participation in or support of large-scale violent crackdowns during this period. Allegations include involvement in mass detentions, coordinated use of lethal force against civilians, and cooperation with other security bodies in suppressing unrest.

== See also ==
- Guidance Patrol
- Hezbollah of Iran
- Islamic Revolutionary Guard Corps
- Killing of Neda Agha-Soltan
- List of armed groups in the Syrian Civil War
- Political repression in the Islamic Republic of Iran
- Popular Mobilization Forces
- Zahra Bani Yaghoub
- Ebrahim Zolfaghari

=== Other paramilitary groups ===
- Alianza Apostólica Anticomunista (Spain)
- Argentine Anticommunist Alliance (Argentina)
- Colectivos (Venezuela)
- Extermination battalions (Soviet Union)
- Petrus (Indonesia, under Suharto)
- Janjaweed and Rapid Support Forces (Sudan)
- Red Guards (China)
- Schutzstaffel (Nazi Germany)
- Shabiha (Ba'athist Syria)
- Tonton Macoute (Duvalier Haiti)
