= Nejad =

Nejad is an Iranian surname and may refer to:

- Ali Nejad (born 1978), Iranian-American television poker commentator
- Ezzat Ebrahim-Nejad, Iranian student, poet and demonstrator shot dead by security forces in Tehran University in 1999
- Korosh Nejad, Iranian professional poker player based in London, England
- Peyman Askari Nejad (born 1977), USA based Principal Structural Engineer
- Qasim Ali Zahir Nejad (1303–1378), Major General in the Army of Iran after the 1357 revolution
- Sharmin Meymandi Nejad, Iranian writer and director and the establisher of the Imam Ali Society
- Vahid Hamdi Nejad, Iranian footballer

== See also ==
- Eslah Nejad Intersection, intersection in southern central Shiraz, Iran
