= Political repression in the Islamic Republic of Iran =

Political repression has been practiced in Iran since the Iranian Revolution of 1979. This repression culminated in Ayatollah Ruhollah Khomeini's rise to power and the establishment of an Islamic republic, whose political system combines religious and state institutions that it previously overthrew. Human rights organizations have accused the Islamic Republic of executing, torturing, and repressing political opponents and dissidents. Survivors described being blindfolded, waiting in corridors to be brought before a committee, and witnessing prisoners being taken for execution—including those whose health had deteriorated due to torture. Human rights groups have alleged that such practices are used to suppress political dissent. In 2024, the UN Special Rapporteur on Human Rights in Iran published a report that categorized the 1981–1982 massacres and 1988 executions as crimes against humanity and genocide. Since the 2026 Iran massacres, repression has become nearly total, with prohibitions against open dissent being strictly enforced.

== Establishment of the Islamic Republic and early repression (1979–1989) ==
=== 1979 revolution and rise of the Islamic Republic ===
The 1979 Islamic Revolution, which resulted in the overthrow of the Pahlavi monarchy, marked a significant shift in governance for Iran. Following this revolution, political power was held by the clerical leadership of Ayatollah Khomeini; he sought to establish an Islamic state based on the concept of Wilāyat al-Faqīh (Guardianship of the Islamic Jurist), a doctrine that grants supreme political authority to the highest-ranking cleric.

Having overthrown the previous government because it oppressed civil liberties, Khomeini was first viewed as a unifying figure who did not seek power, but sought only to help liberate the Iranian people, as well as being an ally of the different branches of the Iranian opposition. However, Khomeini's regime subsequently moved to swiftly and systematically eliminate rival political groups.

=== 1980s: revolutionary purges and consolidation of power ===
==== 1981–1982 massacres ====
The 1981 massacre was orchestrated by the Islamic Republic of Iran, which targeted perceived political and religious opponents of the Islamic Republic. Among those targeted were intellectuals, artists, scientists, liberals, monarchists, socialists, ethnic minorities, and members of religious groups such as the Bahá'ís. Lasting from June 1981 to March 1982, this mass violence was part of the Cultural Revolution in Iran, which was initiated by Ayatollah Khomeini in order to remove non-Islamic influences from Iranian society. This purge led to the deaths of thousands of political and religious dissidents, as well as critics of the regime.

In 2024, the UN Special Rapporteur classified the crimes committed during this period as both genocide and crimes against humanity. The report called for establishing an independent international body to investigate and hold those responsible accountable for their actions during the massacre.

==== 1988 executions of political opposition ====
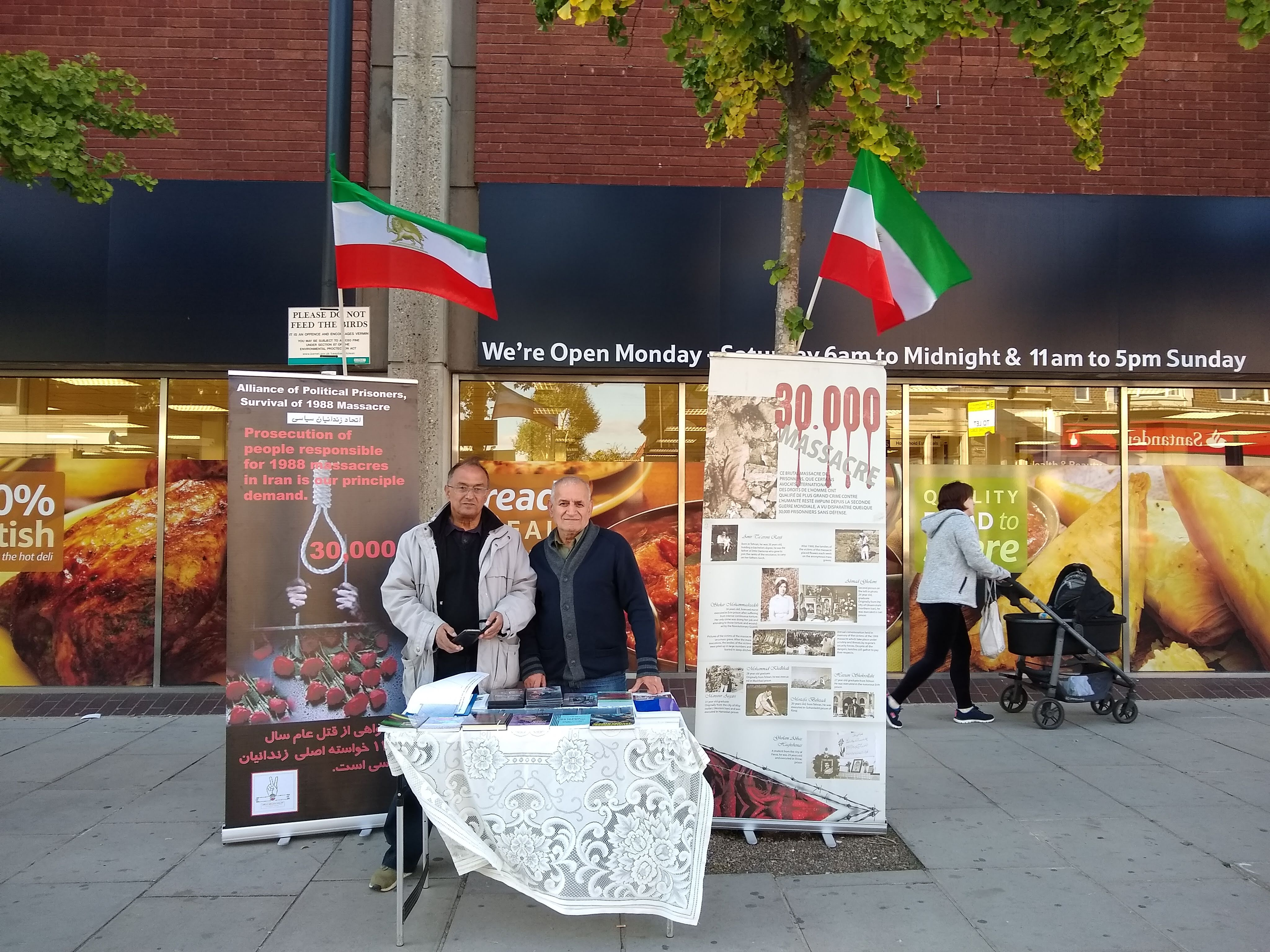
Iranians in London in 2018, calling for justice over 1988 executions

In mid-1988, Ayatollah Khomeini, the Supreme Leader of Iran, ordered the execution of thousands of political prisoners. These executions took place over five months, beginning in July, in at least 32 cities in Iran. The executions were conducted without legal process, after trials that focused on determining neither guilt nor innocence. Many prisoners were subjected to torture, and the executions were carried out in secrecy. The exact number of those killed remains uncertain, but estimates range from 2,800 to 5,000 people, according to the NGO Human Rights Watch (HRW); some human rights organizations such as Amnesty International (Amnesty) estimate at least 5,000 people killed.

Most victims supported the People's Mujahedin of Iran (MeK) party, but people from other leftist groups—such as the Fedaian and the Tudeh Party—were also executed. While a possible motive for the killings was retaliation for the MeK's Operation Mersad in 1988, some victims were unrelated to that operation. Ayatollah Montazeri, the Deputy Supreme Leader at the time, claimed that the regime had planned these executions for years, using the MeK operation as a pretext. Survivors have called for accountability. In 2024, the UN Special Rapporteur on Human Rights in Iran classified the killings as crimes against humanity, a characterization that was shared by a number of other governments.

== Political repression under Ali Khamenei (1989–2026) ==
=== Transition to Khamenei's leadership ===
In 1989, following the death of Ayatollah Khomeini, Ali Khamenei assumed the role of Supreme Leader of Iran. A former president and a close ally of Khomeini, Khamenei continued the policies of the Islamic Republic. According to the British newspaper The Guardian, he acted by "eliminating opponents and rewarding those loyal to him". Among those targeted by Khamenei were poets.

=== 1999 student uprising ===
The Islamic Consultative Assembly of Iran (the Majles) passed a tough press censorship law on July 7, 1999; the next day the reformist newspaper Salaam was shut down, which sparked student protests.

Around 200 students gathered outside a dormitory at the University of Tehran to protest against the press censorship law. Around 4 am on July 9, 400 uniformed men with blue batons stormed the dormitory, beating sleeping students and pushing some from second- and third-floor windows. While the official death toll was two, students claim that five to eight people died, with one confirmed victim being a former student of activist Ezzat Ebrahim-Nejad. Raamin Karimi, a student, was beaten and thrown from a third-floor window; he was "offered to God" as a sacrifice by his attackers.

The student protests spread across 18 cities—including Tabriz, Shiraz, Isfahan, Mashhad, and Yazd—within days. Students demanded freedom of the press, the release of political prisoners, accountability for the security forces, and the transfer of the military from the Supreme Leader to the elected government.

Regime response

Khamenei initially condemned the attacks and called students "my sons and daughters"; however, within days he reframed the protesters as "rioters and bandits backed by terrorist groups and foreign enemies". Khamenei publicly described the protesters as a threat to national security and pledged to "stand in their way". The deputy speaker, Hassan Rouhani, warned that those involved could be executed as mohareb ("fighters against God"). The organization Iran Human Rights Monitor (Iran HRM) notes that this pattern of labelling protesters as seditionists or mohareb, and calling for decisive force, recurred in all major uprisings under Khamenei (in 1999, 2009, 2019, 2022, and 2025–26), reflecting an entrenched governance model.

Following the 1999 and 2003 protests, thousands of demonstrators were arrested; many faced torture, solitary confinement, prison sentences, and death sentences later commuted. Some detainees disappeared entirely, while many released students were expelled from universities and prohibited from employment.

The security forces’ accountability was limited: only two policemen received minor punishments, while 15 vigilantes involved in the dormitory raid were acquitted. Iran HRM describes the lack of accountability for state violence as a recurring feature of protests in Iran since 1999.

=== Repression of 2009 protests ===
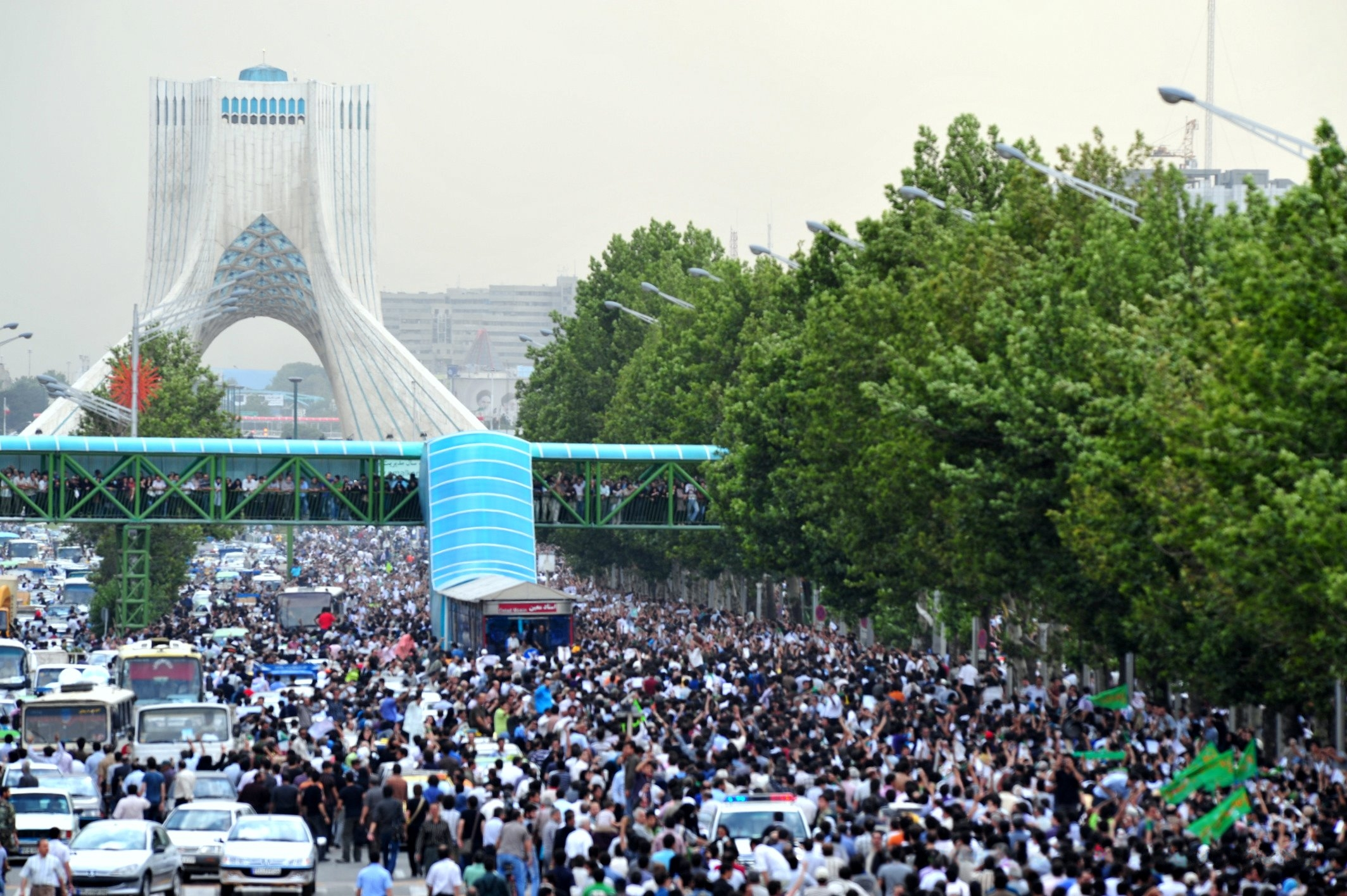
Green Movement protest against electoral fraud

After Mahmoud Ahmadinejad was declared the winner of presidential elections—amid allegations by the Iranian opposition of widespread electoral fraud—there were widespread protests known collectively as the Green Movement. This movement was the most significant challenge to the Islamic Republic since the 1980s, with more than one million protesters in Tehran alone. Protesters demanded the annulment of the election results and the resignation of the government, accusing the regime of rigging the election.

In response to the protests, the Iranian government used police, the Islamic Revolutionary Guard Corps (IRGC), and its paramilitary Basij militia. Basij members carried out night raids, as well as raids against the homes of Iranians during protests. According to the American newspaper Los Angeles Times, militiamen from the Ansar-e Hezbollah party warned that they would patrol the streets to enforce law and order.

Thousands of people were arrested; hundreds were killed; and many others were tortured or forced into making televised confessions. The movement effectively ended in February 2011, when its leaders Mir-Hossein Mousavi and Mehdi Karroubi were placed under house arrest.

=== 2017–2018 Dey protests ===
Public protests erupted across several cities in Iran starting on December 28, 2017, and continued into early 2018; these protests are often referred to as the Dey protests. The protests initially began in Mashhad, Iran's second-largest city, before spreading to around 150 cities in more than two weeks. The protests focused on economic issues, specifically a sharp increase in the price of eggs; however, the protests quickly expanded to include political opposition to the theocratic government and Supreme Leader Ali Khamenei. Demonstrators expressed their anger through various chants directed at the regime and its leadership, including the provocative chant "Death to the dictator!" aimed at Khamenei. Fewer than 30 people were killed, including some police and Basij; the regime exercised relative restraint compared to protests in 2019. According to the American newspaper The Washington Post, these protests—along with attacks on government buildings—disrupted a regime with little tolerance for dissent, with some protesters even urging security forces to join them.

=== 2019 fuel protests ===
The 2019 protests were triggered by a sudden increase in gasoline prices on November 15. The protests rapidly spread across 29 out of 31 Iranian provinces, with an estimated 200,000 participants and 7,000 arrests, according to security officials. A 2020 report by HRW found that Iranian authorities continued to tightly suppress peaceful activism—targeting human rights defenders, lawyers, and political prisoners who spoke out against government corruption, mismanagement, and repression. The regime's response to protests, including those in November 2019, involved excessive and lethal force, according to HRW. Security forces killed at least 230 people, according to official figures—though Reuters estimated that the true death toll exceeded 1,500—with tanks, heavy armor, and machine guns deployed in some cities. Iran also took down the Internet nationwide for five days, not only to prevent the spread of dissent, but also to cut off protesters from each other and to control the scale of the protests as seen by outside observers.

According to HRW, the Iranian government is a world leader in carrying out executions, performing 233 executions in 2020. Among those executed were people convicted of crimes when they were children. Human rights defenders, ethnic minorities, and political activists face arbitrary imprisonment, torture, and unfair trials, according to HRW. The government's actions—including the imprisonment of peaceful dissenters and a failure to hold security forces accountable—are said to have deepened public frustration with the regime.

=== 2022 protests ===
Iranian protesters killed per province in Iran during 2022 protests

In September 2022, HRW reported that widespread protests in Iran were met with excessive and lethal force from security forces—including unlawful killings, torture, sexual assault, and enforced disappearances of protesters, including women and children. HRW reported at least 500 deaths, including those of 68 children. Security forces reportedly used various types of bullets to shoot victims. HRW also reported that a 17-year-old boy, a high school student, was sexually assaulted; another was pushed onto a lit gas range and tortured during her arrest. HRW also found that Iranian interrogators used needles to torture a boy.

In 2023, as the anniversary of Mahsa Amini's death approached, HRW reported that Iranian authorities intensified their repression of dissent—targeting activists, students, and families of those killed in the 2022 protests. HRW reported that government efforts to enforce compulsory hijab laws increased, alongside arrests of women's rights defenders, artists, and lawyers.

Iranian academic Ali Sharifi Zarchi was dismissed from his position for expressing support for the protesters, but he was eventually reinstated following public pressure.

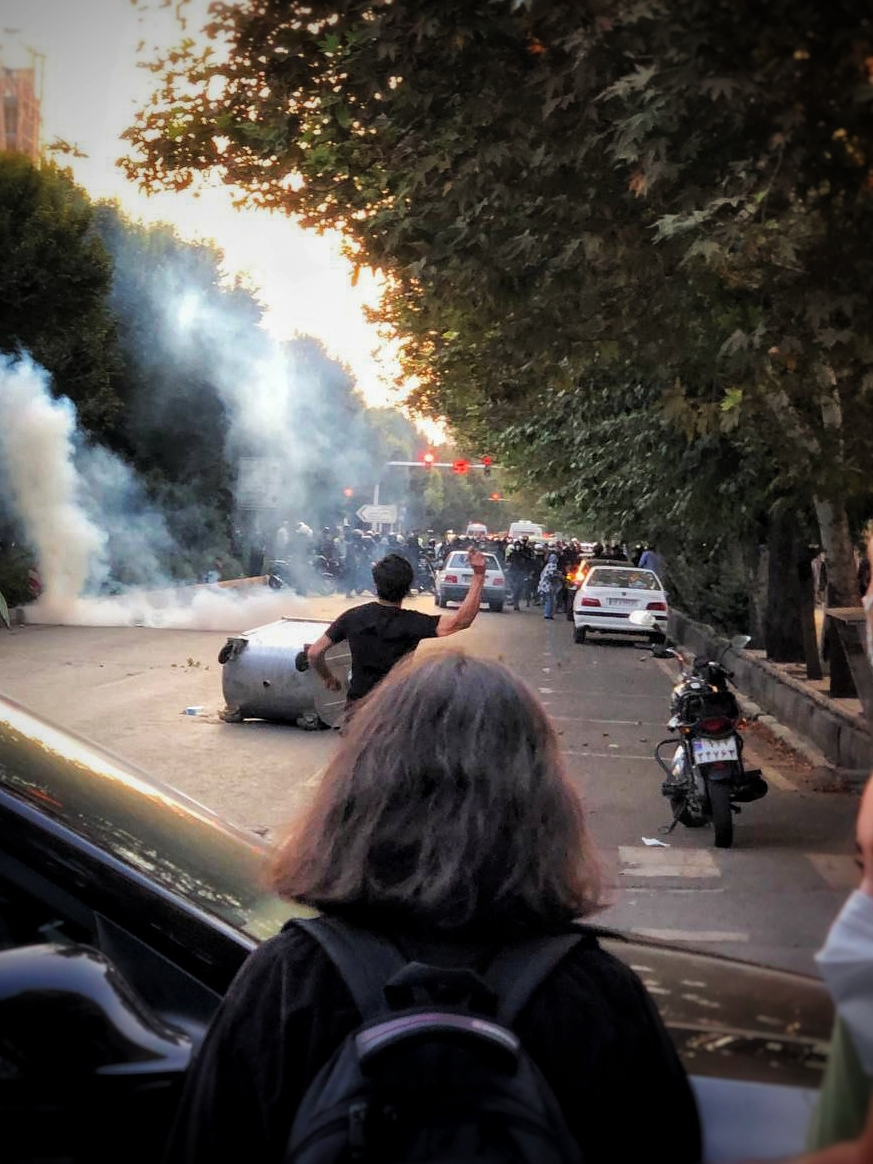
Protests in Tehran

=== During the Twelve-Day War ===
Following the onset of the Twelve-Day War, Amnesty reported that Iranian authorities escalated their political repression by targeting individuals accused of espionage or collaboration with Israel. The government called for expedited trials and executions, targeting those whom the Iranian government accused of "enmity against God" and "corruption on earth", which are punishable by death in Iran. Amnesty expressed grave concerns about what it called the systematic abuse of the death penalty. Amnesty warned that these charges are often used to punish individuals for peacefully exercising their rights to freedom of expression. The Iranian government also targeted family members of the detained and those already on death row. Amnesty reported a heightened risk of execution for individuals such as Swedish-Iranian academic Ahmadreza Djalali and others, who were sentenced after unfair trials and forced confessions.

To increase the use of the death penalty, Iran's parliament fast-tracked legislation to automatically assign death sentences for espionage or cooperation with hostile governments. Amnesty said that the bill was aimed at streamlining executions on national security charges, including those not involving intentional killing. Amnesty reported that during the war, the Iranian regime repressed dissent through arbitrary arrests, forced confessions, and executions, which instill fear and maintain control over the Iranian people during conflict.

The American news website Long War Journal (LWJ) wrote that Iranian authorities have cracked down on citizens whom it accuses of sharing online content seen as supportive of Israel. The government arrested at least 19 individuals in Hormozgan and Yazd provinces for allegedly spreading misinformation or photographing sensitive sites. Iranian officials cited Article 8 of a national security law, and they said that their actions were in order to combat "hostile measures". The regime also cracked down on Internet access, a tactic often used to stifle dissent. In response, businessman Elon Musk stated that Starlink was currently functioning in Iran. The LWJ wrote that at least 10 people were detained on espionage charges linked to Israel, with two people executed at the outset of the conflict.

Iranian general Majid Khademi stated that immediately after the Twelve-Day War, 2,735 people allegedly linked to anti-security networks were arrested.

=== 2026 Iran massacres ===
The Iranian government's crackdown during the 2025–2026 protests resulted in massacres that left tens of thousands of protesters dead, making it one of the largest massacres in modern Iranian history.

According to the Human Rights Movement News Agency (HRANA), in the two weeks after December 28, 2025, more than 18,000 people were arrested and at least 2,571 people died. On January 14, the Iranian Human Rights Organization (based in Norway) said that at least 3,428 protesters were killed by Iranian security forces, and at least 10,000 protesters were arrested, during the peak of unrest from January 8 to 12. On January 14, the government signaled its readiness to swiftly try and execute anti-government protesters; it intensified the crackdown on demonstrations across the country, signifying that the death toll could increase further.

Sources close to Iran's Supreme National Security Council and the presidential office report as follows: the killing of protesters was carried out on the direct order of Khamenei, with full approval from senior state officials. The council allegedly authorized live fire, which was carried out mainly by the IRGC in what is described as a deliberate, organized operation that was exceptional in scale and intensity. On January 13, the Guardian reported that Islamic Republic security forces were documented as using shotguns and rifles with live ammunition—in addition to heavy DShK machine guns—against protesters.

Reports noted the presence of Iraqi Popular Mobilization Forces, Arabic-speaking mercenaries, Lebanon's Hezbollah, and the Afghan militia Liwa Fatemiyoun in suppressing protests. The Iranian government has been accused of using footage of protesters' bodies in morgues to demoralize future protesters. Families trying to recover the bodies of their loved ones have often been forced to pay compensation for the bullets that killed their relatives. Reports stated that security forces and Revolutionary Guard members raided and intimidated the families of protesters who were killed, imposed restrictions on the retrieval and burial of bodies, and warned that families would be charged fees. There have been reports that families could not locate the remains of relatives after authorities buried them in locations far from where the deaths occurred. Reports have also indicated that authorities retained the remains until families consented to official accounts describing the deceased as aligned with the government and Basij, rather than as protesters. Similarly, images and videos from pro-government rallies were reportedly altered. In addition, multiple testimonies have revealed Iranian security forces raiding hospitals to arrest—and in many cases execute—hospitalized protesters.

On January 13, in a televised statement, the office of the Tehran prosecutor declared that an undeclared number of protesters would be charged with moharebeh, or "waging war against God"—an offense punishable by death in Iran and used extensively in the past by the regime's judiciary. According to the Human Rights Activists News Agency, as of January 14, 2026, more than 18,400 people had been arrested.

Human rights observers reported that tens of thousands of people were detained during the protests, with security forces arresting those suspected of participating in demonstrations. According to rights organizations, authorities have also focused on particular groups viewed as posing a threat to the state—including certain politicians, medical professionals, legal practitioners, and journalists. Repression has become nearly total, with prohibitions against open dissent being strictly enforced.

=== Internet blackouts ===
On January 8, 2026, the government imposed significant restrictions on telephone and Internet access, in order to limit communication and the dissemination of information. Unlike during the Twelve-Day War, the Internet was not officially shut down nationwide. However, connectivity was heavily disrupted in cities experiencing active demonstrations, making it difficult for citizens to send messages, share media, or organize further protests. These measures were widely seen as part of the authorities' efforts to suppress dissent and control the narrative around the unrest.

On January 9, it was reported by multiple media outlets that Iran—in a largely unprecedented measure—had activated military-grade jammers to disrupt civilian Starlink signals. Initially, only 30% of media traffic was affected, but the proportion rose to 80% within several hours. However, effective the morning after the blackout began, Islamic Republic authorities issued a "whitelist" which allowed government-affiliated institutions and accounts limited access to the Internet; included were government-aligned media and Telegram channels, as well as some universities. American magazine Forbes quoted Virtual Private Network (VPN) expert Simon Migliano as saying that "Iran's current nationwide blackout is a blunt instrument intended to crush dissent." Migliano also addressed the cost of the Internet shutdown, saying "this 'kill switch' approach comes at a staggering price, draining $1.56 million from Iran's economy every single hour the Internet is down." On January 11, Iran shut down the Starlink Internet for the first time.

=== 2026 Iran war ===
During the 2026 Iran war, the government shut down all branches of the Lamiz cafe after it used a design that some interpreted as mocking the death of Ali Khamenei. The Iranian judiciary seized the assets of people it described as "supporters of the United States and Israel" without providing any evidence. At least 4,000 people were arrested on national security charges following the outbreak of the 2026 war. The UN documents cases of enforced disappearance, torture, and coerced televised confessions among detainees. Before the war, around 21,000 people had already been arrested in connection with the June 2025 hostilities. These arrests included people prosecuted for online expressions of support for or content about Israeli strikes on Iran. Such people were convicted by courts following unfair trials based on confessions made under torture. Amnesty noted that authorities "used the context of armed conflict as a pretext to further intensify repression", increasing the use of the death penalty as a tool of political repression, even when the country was under bombardment.

=== United Nations' response ===
On January 5, 2026, António Guterres—Secretary-General of the United Nations—urged the Iranian government to respect the rights of peaceful protesters. On January 11, Guterres released a statement saying that he was "shocked by reports of violence and excessive use of force by Iranian authorities against protesters across the country", pressuring the Iranian government to restore communications. The UN Human Rights Council adopted a resolution on January 23, 2026: it condemned the violent crackdown on peaceful protesters and urged the Iranian government to stop the unjust killings, enforced disappearances, sexual and gender-based violence, and arbitrary detention.

== Mechanisms of political repression ==
=== Role of the Islamic Revolutionary Guard Corps ===
The Islamic Revolutionary Guard Corps (IRGC) plays a central role in enforcing political repression in Iran. Under the IRGC's control is the Basij militia, which is tasked with controlling and oppressing dissent against the Islamic Revolution. The IRGC was created to protect the new theocratic regime, prevent coups, and protect Ayatollah Khomeini's vision of a state based on velayat-e faqih ("guardianship of the jurist"). The IRGC has grown into a powerful military, political, and economic force. It is tasked with maintaining internal security and defending the regime against perceived threats, both domestic and foreign. Former members occupy high-ranking government positions. It has amassed wealth by operating networks that bypass international sanctions. The organization is responsible for overseeing various repressive activities, including suppressing protests, surveilling opposition figures, and controlling media and Internet access. The IRGC is said to control between 20% and 40% of the Iranian economy.

==== The Basij ====
The Basij, a paramilitary force under the IRGC, plays a key role in enforcing political repression in Iran. Established in 1979 by Ayatollah Khomeini, it functions as a tool for maintaining regime control, suppressing dissent, and policing public morality. The Basij is instrumental in quelling protests and has been involved in violent crackdowns throughout Iran's history. Its members, including underage recruits, students, and elderly people, are mobilized to enforce the regime's policies and maintain internal security. Despite not receiving salaries, Basij members benefit from preferential access to government jobs and services. A central element of the IRGC, the Basij is a powerful force used by the regime to suppress opposition and maintain its political grip on the country.

The Basij has used violence against students, women, and opposition activists.

=== Judicial and legal repression ===
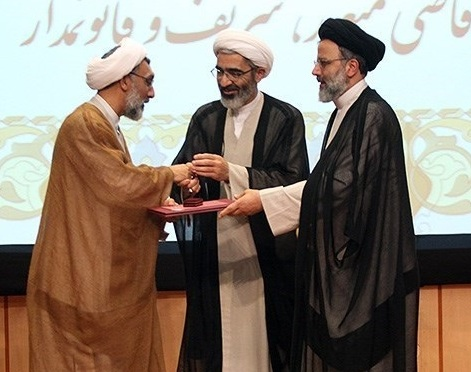
Mostafa Pourmohammadi (left) and future President of Iran Ebrahim Raisi (right), who belonged to the "Judges of Death" committee of the 1988 executions, in 2013

The Iranian judiciary plays an important role in maintaining fear among the population, as well as suppressing dissent and maintaining the regime's control. Courts in Iran lack independence from government or religion. Political dissidents are sometimes denied access to legal representation and can be forced to make confessions through torture. Arbitrary arrests and trials deemed unfair by Amnesty are held. Amnesty also reported that Iran's detention of foreign nationals in Iran can amount to hostage taking.

The Iranian legal system features capital punishment for political crimes, including charges such as efsad-fil-arz ("corruption on earth"), moharabeh ("waging war against God"), insulting the Islamic prophet Muhammad, and others.

=== Media censorship and Internet surveillance ===
Media censorship is a tool of political repression in the Islamic Republic of Iran. The government controls all major newspapers, television stations, and radio stations, with independent journalism being severely restricted. Journalists who criticize the government or cover political events are subject to violence. The media in Iran were described by the Foundation for Defense of Democracies (FDD) as "propaganda".

Iran has one of the world's most restrictive systems of Internet censorship; the government and the IRGC block access to around 70% of the Internet, including major platforms such as YouTube, Twitter, Facebook, and Telegram. The government heavily monitors and restricts Internet traffic, with the Internet Filtering Committee deciding which sites to block. In response to the 2019 protests, Iran implemented a total Internet shutdown, reducing traffic to 5% of normal levels. Following the 2022 protests over Mahsa Amini's death, Iran was ranked as the second-highest country for Internet censorship. Authorities have targeted VPNs to block access to foreign media. As of 2025, more than 100,000 Starlink (satellite Internet) terminals were operating in Iran.

=== Seizure of bodies of protesters ===
The Islamic Republic of Iran has been accused of seizing the bodies of deceased protesters from hospitals and morgues, thereby preventing their families from conducting funerals, which could otherwise become focal points for further protests. Human rights organizations have documented similar incidents since 1979, with cases escalating after periods of protest. The UN has reported that Iran has refused to return the bodies of some of the deceased, and the UN has associated this practice with Iran's treatment of detained protesters.

The confiscation of bodies is viewed as a method to deny the victims and their families dignity and respect, as well as a way to conceal atrocities committed by the government. Such an act violates both international human rights law and Islamic law, which mandate proper burial and respect for the deceased. In addition to violating legal and moral principles, this practice also denies families the right to seek justice and truth concerning their loved ones' deaths. By preventing funerals, the authorities are supposedly aiming to stifle potential protests and obscure the true scale of violence against protesters.

=== Hostage diplomacy ===
Iran has been accused of using hostage diplomacy by "systematically" arresting foreign nationals and Iranians with dual citizenship to obtain political concessions from other countries. A dual German-Iranian citizen was charged with "belonging to an illegal organization" and spreading "propaganda against the regime". The German broadcaster Deutsche Welle (DW) reported that there was no evidence supporting these charges. Lawyers representing detainees in Iran have argued that such arrests are often politically motivated, with individuals detained to be exchanged for other prisoners or political gains at a later date. DW said that the practice of holding foreign nationals as bargaining chips began when Iranian students took US embassy personnel hostage to pressure the US government in 1979.

Dual nationals detained in Iran include German-Iranian Nahid Taghavi and Swedish-Iranian academic Ahmadreza Djalali. DW journalist Shabnam von Hein noted that the tactic of hostage taking increases during discussions of Iran's nuclear program.

=== Ecological repression ===
Political repression in Iran is sometimes linked to environmental governance and resource extraction. In the Iranian region of Azerbaijan, the desiccation of Lake Urmia—caused largely by dam constructions and agricultural policies—is a form of environmental injustice that disproportionately affects ethnolinguistic minority communities such as Azeris and Kurds who live in areas surrounding the lake.

In Khuzestan, large-scale hydrological interventions—including dam building and river management projects—have been associated with long-term ecological degradation, water scarcity, and displacement of local livelihoods. These processes have been accompanied by the use of security forces to suppress unrest, including violent crackdowns during the 2021 water protests. Generally speaking, environmental transformations are often enforced through coercive state practices, where policing and repression are used to secure development projects and manage populations affected by resource extraction and ecological decline.

== Repression of ethnic and religious minorities ==
Since the establishment of the Islamic Republic in 1979, ethnic and religious minorities in Iran have faced varying forms of political repression and discrimination. After the revolution, violent confrontations occurred between the new Islamic government and several minority groups who had expected greater cultural and political autonomy under the new regime. During the 1980s, the state intensified military and security campaigns in minority-populated border regions, especially in Iranian Kurdistan. Minority activism and demands for autonomy were framed as threats to national unity and territorial integrity. While periodic gestures were made toward greater inclusiveness and pluralism—for example during the Khatami presidency—since the 2005 presidential elections, exclusionary discourses have dominated Iranian politics. The election of President Ahmadinejad was followed by several periods of unrest amongst minority communities, which were met with repression and violence. Beyond violent repression, persistent inequalities have affected these same groups—particularly concerning political representation, economic development, language rights, and religious freedom. During the 2022–2023 Women, Life, Freedom protests, minority-populated regions such as Kurdistan and the Sistan and Baluchestan province again became major centers of unrest, and they experienced some of the deadliest state repression. Structural discrimination against ethnic and religious minorities remains embedded in Iranian law and policy.

=== Ethnic minorities ===
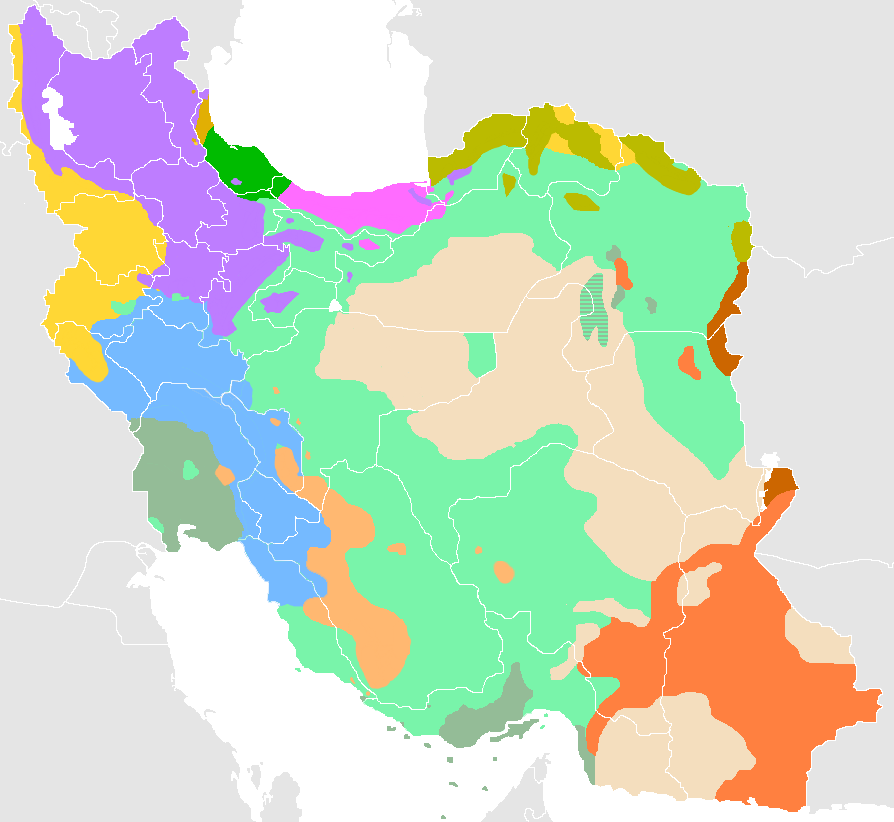
Map of Iran's ethnic composition

Approximately half of Iran's population is ethnically Persian. Forming up to 24% of the population, Azeris constitute the second-largest ethnic group. In addition, 8% of the Iranian population are Kurdish; Arab tribes make up 3%; and Balochis and Turkmens each consist of roughly 2% of the population. Beyond these groups, several smaller ethnic communities exist throughout Iran.

==== Iranian Azerbaijanis ====
The Islamic Republic often portrays the Turkic-speaking Azerbaijanis (Azeris)—who mainly reside in northwest Iran along the border with Azerbaijan—as a well-integrated minority, probably because most of them are Shia Muslims. However, because the state nevertheless prioritizes Persian as the national language, Azerbaijani-language education and broader expressions of ethnic identity are limited. Activists who demand education in their own language, for example, are regularly arrested. Furthermore, a state-run assimilation program attempts to control the pace of population growth and the spread of activist groups. Iranian authorities have also viewed Azeri activism with increasing suspicion, particularly following the establishment of the independent country Azerbaijan in 1991, which strengthened cross-border and national identification among Iranian Azeris.

One of the largest episodes of Azeri unrest under the Islamic Republic occurred in May 2006: protests erupted across Tabriz, Urmia, Ardabil, and other cities after a state-run newspaper published a cartoon comparing Azeris to cockroaches. Although the newspaper later apologized, demonstrations continued for weeks, and these were met with mass arrests and violent repression by security forces. Azerbaijani activists subsequently commemorated the protests as a "national awakening" movement against ethnic discrimination. In 2011, violent repression occurred during peaceful protests against the degradation of Lake Urmia in Western Azerbaijan. Security forces attacked and killed a number of protesters and arrested hundreds.

Repression of Azeri activists intensified again during the Women, Life, Freedom protests in 2022–2023. Iranian authorities sentenced dozens of Azeri activists to long prison sentences on charges such as "propaganda against the state", "espionage", and "acting against national security" because authorities associated peaceful advocacy for cultural and minority rights with separatism and opposition activity. For example, labor activist Sharifeh Mohammadi, from East Azerbaijan, was sentenced to death in 2024 based on allegations that she belonged to an opposition group. After Mohammadi was held in solitary confinement and tortured, her mother was finally allowed to visit her. During this visit, Mohammadi was forbidden to speak to her mother in Azerbaijani and was forced to communicate in Persian, even though her mother does not speak Persian.

==== Baluchis ====
Since the establishment of the Islamic Republic, Iran's Baluchi population has faced persistent political, economic, and religious discrimination. Most Baluchis live in the southeastern province of Sistan and Baluchestan, one of the poorest and most underdeveloped regions in Iran; this province is characterized by high unemployment, low literacy rates, limited access to healthcare and education, and disproportionate state security. Baluchis are predominantly Sunni Muslim; therefore, within the Shia-based political system of the Islamic Republic, they face both ethnic and religious persecution. The often overlooked Afro-Baluchi community—whose ancestors were taken from East Africa and brought to southeastern Iran as slaves in the 18th century—is subject to additional racial discrimination from both Baluchi communities and the state. Baluchis also face restrictions on using the Baluchi language, exclusion from public-sector employment through ideological screening procedures, and discrimination against Sunni religious institutions and leaders.

State repression increased after the emergence of the Sunni Baluchi militant group Jondallah in the mid-2000s. After the group carried out several attacks, Iranian authorities responded with mass arrests, executions, televised confessions allegedly obtained under torture, and expanded military operations in Baluchi areas. Baluchis accused of national security offenses were subjected to arbitrary detention and widespread use of the death penalty.

During the Women, Life, Freedom protests, Sistan and Baluchestan became one of the principal centers of unrest, and it experienced some of the deadliest state violence in the country. Baluchis were disproportionately targeted during the crackdown, which represents only one episode of the structural discrimination that they have continually faced in the Islamic Republic.

==== Iranian Kurds ====
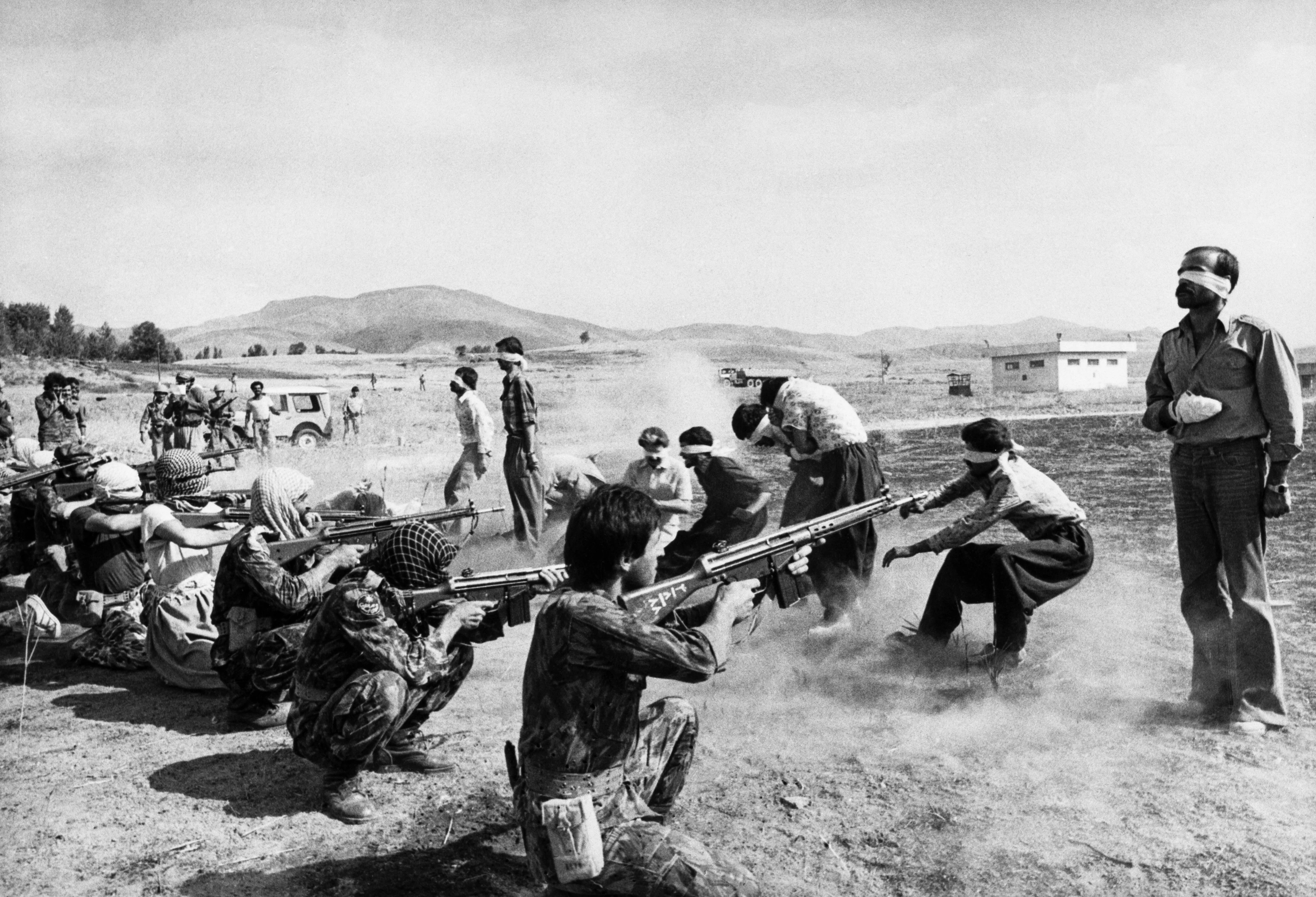
A firing squad of the Islamic Republic at the Sanandaj airport in Iran. In a 30-minute trial, 11 prisoners from the Kurdish rebellion were charged with the crimes of firearm trafficking, murder, and inciting riots. The prisoners were sentenced to death.

The Iranian region of Kurdistan (Rojhelat) has been one of the most heavily secured regions of the country since 1979. Following the revolution, Kurdish demands for political autonomy and cultural rights were rejected by the new regime; this led to an armed conflict between Kurdish groups and state forces during the 1980s. In the summer of 1979, people in the city of Mariwan staged a peaceful protest in a camp on the outskirts of the city. Ayatollah Khomeini responded by declaring a jihad on all Kurds and launching a full-scale invasion into Rojhelat—including massacres in Qarna and Qalatan, as well as seizing the city of Mahabad, where the army arrived with F4-fighter jets and tanks. During the Iran-Iraq war, Rojhelat was turned into a front line of the war; in its aftermath, many Kurdish opposition groups were forced into exile in Iraqi Kurdistan. The Islamic Republic subsequently described Kurdish political activism as a threat to Iran's territorial integrity and national security, in order to justify extensive militarization, surveillance, repression, and discrimination in Kurdish-populated provinces. In Kurdistan, state policies combine military repression and cultural assimilation programs aimed at restricting Kurdish-language education, political organization, and—more broadly—the expression of Kurdish identity. Over the following decades, Kurdish activists, journalists, teachers, and political organizers were often arrested, imprisoned, or executed on charges related to separatism or national security; media campaigns portrayed Kurds in Iran as violent, backward, and linked to foreign-backed separatism. Kurdish-populated regions remain economically marginalized and subject to intermittent military operations.

After the Women, Life, Freedom protests were triggered by the death of Iranian-Kurdish woman Mahsa Amini in police custody, Kurdish regions became centers of contention. Demonstrations began in Saqqez and rapidly spread throughout Kurdistan, where protesters invoked long-standing Kurdish slogans, symbols, and histories of resistance—including the movement's main slogan, which was translated from the Kurdish Jin, Jiyan, Azadi. Like the Baluchis, Kurdish minorities were disproportionately targeted during the crackdown and experienced unlawful killings, mass arrests, torture, and Internet shutdowns; this occurred within a broader pattern of structural discrimination and security enforcement by the Islamic Republic.

==== Khuzestani Arabs ====
Khuzestani Arabs face repression through economic neglect, inadequate infrastructure—including collapsing buildings and frequent electricity outages—exploitation of resources in their province with no benefit to them, and resource scarcity (particularly water shortages). Protests against these conditions are regularly met with violent and military repression by the regime. Although they initially supported the Islamic Revolution, many Khuzestani Arabs—who live in the resource-rich, southwestern province of Khuzestan—became disillusioned after their demands for greater cultural and political rights were rejected by the new regime. On May 29, 1979, later referred to as "Black Wednesday", Iranian security forces opened fire on protests in the Khuzestani city of Khorramshahr, and they killed and injured demonstrators. Nevertheless, many Arabs supported Iran in the Iran-Iraq war; however, relations with the central government deteriorated during the following decades amid allegations of discrimination, underdevelopment, and demographic engineering in Arab-majority areas of Iran. High unemployment and poverty rates mark life in Khuzestan, despite the province's contributing 15% of Iran's Gross Domestic Product (GDP), making it the second-highest contributor after the capital, Tehran.

One of the largest episodes of unrest occurred in April 2005 after the circulation of a disputed government document, which allegedly proposed to reduce the Arab population in Khuzestan through population transfers and settlement policies. Demonstrations spread across Ahvaz and other cities, which were violently suppressed by security forces; this resulted in more than 30 deaths, hundreds of injuries, and mass arrests. Large-scale protests continued every two years or so throughout the 2010s and 2020s—particularly over water shortages, pollution, poverty, and state neglect in the province. During the nationwide 2019 fuel protests, Khuzestan experienced one of the deadliest crackdowns, with security forces deploying tanks, armored vehicles, and military-grade weaponry against demonstrators. In July 2021, the "Uprising of the Thirsty" protests over water scarcity spread across Khuzestan, and these were met with live ammunition, mass arrests, Internet shutdowns, and heavy security. During the 2022–2023 "Woman, Life, Freedom" protests, authorities again portrayed unrest in minority regions as foreign-backed separatism; they committed unlawful killings and repression in Khuzestan, including the fatal shooting of 9-year-old Kian Pirfalak in the city of Izeh.

=== Religious minorities ===
Most Iranian citizens are Shia Muslims. However, there are small populations of Christian Armenians and Assyrians; Baháʼís; Jews; Sunni Muslims; and Zoroastrians. Christians, Zoroastrians, and Jews are constitutionally recognized and have guaranteed representation in the parliament.

==== Baháʼís ====
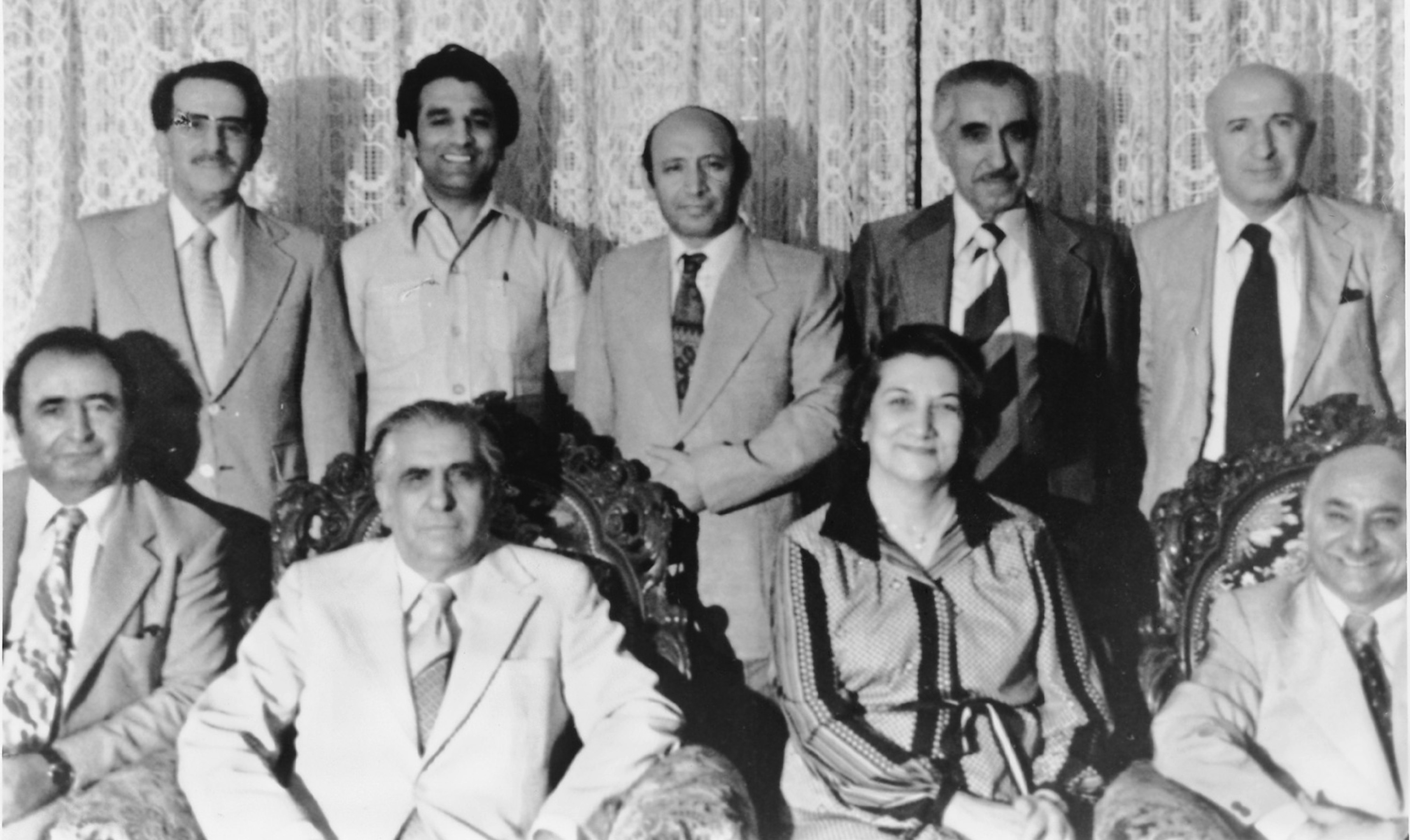
Baha'i members of the National Spiritual Assembly who disappeared in August 1980. All are presumed to have been killed.

The Baháʼís are Iran's largest non-Muslim religious minority. An estimated population of several hundred thousand people lives dispersed throughout the country, particularly in major urban centers such as Tehran, Shiraz, and Isfahan. Since the establishment of the Islamic Republic, Baháʼís have faced systematic religious persecution and have been denied recognition as a protected religious minority under the Iranian Constitution, unlike followers of Christianity, Judaism, and Zoroastrianism. Iranian authorities and senior Shia clerics have frequently portrayed Baháʼís as heretics, apostates, or agents of foreign powers—even though the religion was founded in 19th-century Iran by Iranians. However, Baháʼís maintain their international headquarters in Israel. Shortly before returning to Iran during the revolution, Ayatollah Khomeini stated that Baháʼís would not be allowed to practice their religion under an Islamic government, describing them as a "political faction" rather than a legitimate faith. During the first years of the Islamic Republic, Baháʼí institutions were dissolved; property and cemeteries were confiscated or destroyed; and thousands of Baháʼís were dismissed from public-sector employment. Between 1979 and the mid-1980s, at least 175 Baháʼís were executed or killed, often following accusations of espionage or apostasy. One of the most widely reported incidents occurred in June 1983, when ten Baháʼí women—including 17-year-old Mona Mahmoudnezhad—were executed in Shiraz after refusing to renounce their faith.

By the early 1990s, repression had become increasingly institutionalized. A 1991 memorandum issued by Iran's Supreme Council of the Cultural Revolution instructed authorities to block the "progress and development" of the Baháʼí community, including by denying Baháʼís access to higher education and positions of influence. Baháʼís continued to face arrests, surveillance, hate speech, and restrictions on religious practice throughout the 2000s and 2010s; Baháʼí-owned businesses were periodically shut down, and students were expelled from universities. During the 2022–2023 "Woman, Life, Freedom" protests, Iranian authorities accused the Baháʼí community of helping to initiate the unrest. This led to intensified repression, including house raids, arbitrary arrests, and increased incitement against Baháʼís in state rhetoric.

== See also ==
- History of the Islamic Republic of Iran
- Human rights in the Islamic Republic of Iran
- Iranian external operations
- List of foreign nationals detained in Iran
- Political repression
- Politics of Iran
