= Radio JIBi =

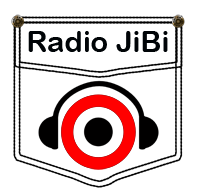
- Type: Public Radio Station
- Country: United States
- Founded: 2014 by Ahmad Batebi
- Headquarters: United States
- Broadcast area: Internet، Frequency modulation
- Launch date: March 2014
- Official website: radiojibi.com
- Language: Persian و English

Radio JIBi is a news and education project. It includes a 24/7 radio station and a virtual school. It aims to present the latest news and scientific and intellectual education in Persian and English.
