= 1999 Iranian student protests =

Violent public protests in Iran

The Iranian student protests of July 1999 (also known as 18th of Tir and Kuye Daneshgah Disaster (Persian: فاجعهٔ کوی دانشگاه) in Iran) (7–13 July) were student protests which were violently repressed by the Basij and Ansar-e Hezbollah. Before the 2009 Iranian election protests, they were the most widespread and violent public protests to occur in Iran since the early years of the Iranian Revolution.

The protests began on 8 July with peaceful demonstrations in Tehran against the closure of the reformist newspaper Salam. Following the demonstrations, a student dormitory was raided by riot police that night during which a student was killed. The raid sparked six days of demonstrations and rioting throughout the country, during which at least three other people were killed and more than 200 injured.

In the aftermath of these incidents, more than seventy students disappeared. In addition to an estimated 1,200–1,400 detainees, the "whereabouts and condition" of five students named by Human Rights Watch who are believed to be detained by Iranian authorities remain unknown.

== Overview ==
The protests began on the eve of 9 July 1999 after a peaceful demonstration by a group of students of Tehran University against the closure of the reformist newspaper, Salam, by the press court. The Salam newspaper (Persian: روزنامه سلام) was operated by the Association of Combatant Clerics, the reformist political party to which the then president, Mohammad Khatami belonged. The student groups, which at the time were considered one of the major supporters of Khatami and his reform programs, were protesting in support of Khatami against the closure of the newspaper by the judiciary, which was controlled by the hardline opponents of President Khatami.

On the evening of the protests, "about 400 plainclothes paramilitaries descended on a university dormitory, whispering into short-wave radios and wielding green sticks." The paramilitaries, thought to be Ansar-e-Hezbollah and Basij, began attacking students, kicking down doors and smashing through halls, grabbing female students by the hair and setting fire to rooms. Several students were thrown off of third story balconies "onto pavement below, their bones crushed", and one student paralyzed. According to students' accounts, uniformed police stood by and did nothing. "Witnesses reported that at least one student was killed, 300 wounded, and thousands detained in the days that followed."

The next day, unrest began in earnest, spreading through Tehran and to other cities and continuing for almost a week, with unemployed youths joining the students. The Basij are reported to have disguised themselves as students (wearing jeans, T-shirts, and shaving their faces) and thrown bricks into shop windows to discredit the student demonstrators. The five days of rioting "turned Tehran into a battlefield," and was "inarguably the worst mass disturbance" the Islamic Republic had seen in its 20 years of existence. Running street battles left downtown Tehran "gutted", with burned-out buses, and smashed storefronts.

There were many arrests and injuries, and at least one confirmed fatal shooting, namely that of Ezzat Ebrahim-Nejad. The death of Ebrahim-Nejad was the only one acknowledged by the state-controlled Iranian television, however, major student groups and the foreign media have claimed more than 17 dead during the week of violent protests. Another student Saeed Zeinali disappeared after his arrest by security forces.

Major Iranian cities such as Tabriz, Mashhad, Shiraz and Esfahan were scenes of violent and widespread demonstrations as well. The protests continued at Tabriz University on 11 July 1999 (20th of Tir) and police and hardliners responded similarly in Tabriz universities and schools, entering the universities and brutally attacked students. Four students died in the unrest and many were beaten while in custody.

According to The Economist magazine, the demonstrations "took a more violent turn on 13 July, when some of the students, deeply dissatisfied with the official response, tried to storm the Ministry of the Interior, the perceived seat of their troubles." On July 13 President Khatami issued a statement "disowning" the demonstrators, stating that continued defiance of the ban on demonstrations was "an attack on the foundations of the régime."

The next day, 14 July, "Tens of thousands of supporters" of Supreme Leader Ali Khamenei rallied in Tehran in a demonstration called by the Organization for Islamic Propagation (Keesing's July 1999). "Reports characterize the demonstration as the régime's counterattack, claiming that the demonstrators include tens of thousands government employees who have been brought to Tehran by bus."

=== Student Uprising: July 1999, "18 Tir" ===
The Iranian student protests of July 1999 is considered to be the first massive uprising initiated by the generation born under the Islamic Republic Regime. The protest grew out of response to the Islamic Republic's violent attack on Tehran University's student dormitory on July 9, 1999, in which numerous students were seriously injured and several killed. Over the next five days proceeding the attack, approximately 50,000 students protested in Tehran, in addition to thousands more in various universities across Iran, against both conservatives and reformists under the Islamic Republic Regime and The Supreme Leader Khamenei, in particular. Student protester's main demand called for the replacement of the Islamic Republic with a government that upheld the ideals of secular democracy. The student protests of July 1999 is considered to be a foundation for the Green Movement of 2009. Many journalists and photojournalists who covered the event were later arrested, tortured, or forced to flee the country due to serious threats to their lives. Among them, three prominent photojournalists like "Hassan Sarbakhshian", "Farzaneh Kalantari", and "Shahram Azad" who documented numerous protests, have never been able to return to the country since.

=== Election of 1997 ===
The presidential election of Mohammad Khatami on 23 May 1997 is symbolic of Iran's desire for reform. The elections resulted in higher voter turnout as a result of Khatami's liberal views that attracted large number of youth and women specifically. In fact, "Iran's youth...reportedly made up a large part of the 20 million who gave Khatami his victory. They were joined by large numbers of women." The election of Khatami brought hope of economic, political and societal reform to Iranian citizens. One of the ways that Khatami appealed to women was by stating his belief that, "women should be active in all social, political and economic activities, and said he would welcome qualified women in his cabinet if he should win the presidency. Efforts should be made to do away with male supremacy". By holding such liberal ideas, Khatami sets himself up for battle against conservative ideology within the judicial sector of the government. In addition, "the Islamic Republic in 1997 was still an oligarchy, controlled by a network of Shi'ite clerics who were disciples of Ayatollah Khomeini" and loyal followers of Islam. Therefore, the liberal views of Khatami did not coincide with those of the clerics. Still, it seems as if Khatami strategically attracts votes from youth and women through his liberalistic views. In fact he "distanced himself from the faltering and unpopular campaign to 'Islamize' the universities, a goal of the conservative faction". This quote indicates that Khatami noticed the dissatisfaction with the conservative's agenda and consequently used this to his advantage. As a result, the election of Khatami publicized the Iranian citizens need for reform, especially in regards to freedom of the press.

=== Government and the press ===
The control of the press that the Iranian government had was a result of the "dysfunctional dualism of political and ideological institutions". The struggle between conservative and moderate reform administrations resulted in restrictions of the press. During this time period, Iran experienced an apparent struggle of power between reformist president Muhammad Khatami and the conservative leader of the Islamic republic, Ayatollah Ali Khamenei. In efforts to decrease support for the president's liberalization agenda, the judiciary closed down newspapers that expressed reformative views. The judiciary justified the closure of several publications on the basis of "factional issues ... The hardline judiciary close[d] reformist publications, while hardline ones that commit[ed] similar violations [were] rarely punished". The judiciary used press policies as a tool to promote conservative views. The judiciary was able to do this because press policies were vague and used to their benefit. Consequently, on 7 July 1999 the Salam daily was closed. The basis of the closure was because of a report revealing plans by the Ministry of Intelligence and Security to restrict the press. The editor of the newspaper faced "charges of spreading fabrications, disturbing public opinion, and publishing classified documents". The judicial sector of the Iranian government had clear objectives to eradicate the spread of reformative views by closing down publications that spread truth to the public however the judiciary distorted the information to enable their control of the press.

The press in Iran, within the boundaries of the established order which consist of the president and the clerics has reflected throughout history intergovernmental debates. These debates are dictated by the structure of governance in the Islamic Republic and who holds power. The press under the Islamic Republic in Iran has never been free. The basis of the Islamic Republic ipso facto was established upon the forceful closure of nearly all the existing free press, in the mid-summer of 1980. The only period that the press was free was from February through July 1980. In addition, since the establishment of the Islamic Republic, the many publications have been connected ideologically to the political sectors that exist in the regime. Still publications that are considered to be pro-reform have endured consequence of closure. Although liberal publications face opposition by law, "they have remained resilient beneath the political undercurrents of the society, as the advocates of freedom of the press, freedom of speech, etc". Nevertheless, liberal independent publications were under risk of extinction due to the marginalization inflicted by the Islamic Republic in Iran.

=== Press and the July 1999 protest ===
In Iran, there has been a history of ideological and governmental conflicts that are revealed in the sphere of politics. Since the election of Khatami, this issue where belief and government come into contact has become more and more apparent. The internal struggle and basic factional disputes within the state are reflected by the management of the press in general and the control of those publications that spoke on behalf of the controlled sects within the government.

The student protest of July 1999 occurred as a result of these restrictions of freedom of the press. Prior to the protest, the publisher of the Daily Saleem was "arrested, put on trial, and convicted for printing" false information. In the Daily Saleem, communication between Saeed Emami, former Deputy Minister of Intelligence of the Islamic Republic to his boss, Intelligence Ministry Chief Qorban-Ali Dorri-Najafabadi was revealed to the public. The Daily Saleem published information about governmental plans to further restrict and control freedom of the press.

In response to the closure of the newspaper, hundreds of students from Tehran University participated in a demonstration on 8 July. This demonstration has been deemed to be peaceful. The day following the demonstration, security forces, including the police and the Ansar-e-Hezbollah, invaded student dormitories and resulted in injuries, arrest and extensive damages to the student dormitories. On July 9, 1999, the students of Tabriz University protested, demanding more freedom and continuing the protests started at Tehran University. Following the invasion of student dormitories, intense pro-democracy demonstrations took place on 12 and 13 July. In response to the pro-democratic protest, Ali Khamenei and his conservative supporters organized a counter-demonstration rally which occurred on 14 July. Consequently, it is estimated that over 1,500 student protesters were arrested. Some scholars recognize the regime's "overreaction to both its own reform counterparts and the opposition forces reveal[s], how weak and insecure the ruling conservatives are". The reasoning behind this idea is that if the government was confident in its laws and policies, it would not demonstrate fear. In the Journal of Iranian Research and Analysis, Cyrus Bina indicates that fear is demonstrated when:

two dozen high-ranking Pasdar commanders present President Khatarni an official letter of ultimatum, telling him that they have no choice except to seize power if he fails to crush the student rebellion soon ... commanders, who are under direct authority of Khamenei, threatened the President that their patience is running thin and that they can no longer stand on the sideline.

The fact that the clerics and judicial sector felt the urgency to immediately stop the student protests is an indication of the fear they had and the amount of influence the protestors could have on Iranian society if their voices were not silenced. Therefore, it is clear that the initial student protest was prompted by the closure of the daily Saleem which occurred on 7 July. The protesters expressed strong objection to the restriction on freedom of the press by the judicial sector. The protest reflects the collective resentment of the public against the suppression of the press and the restriction of basic freedoms and universal rights. After the attack on the students of Tehran University by a hard-line vigilante group, Khatami delivered a speech three months later defending his reform program and insisting on the foundations of his government. He referred to the reformation of the system from within with holding two elements of Islamic and republic.

=== Student demands during protest ===
The end results that the students were expecting from the protest are reflected in the slogans that they chanted during the protest. After researching the popular slogans used during the protest, it is evident that the student had multitude of demands as a result of the six-day demonstrations in Tehran. Still, it is important that the slogans are analyzed in relation the objective of the overall protest. From all the slogans used throughout the protest there is one common theme that ties all of them together, opposition to Ali Khamenei, the "Supreme Leader" as referenced in the slogans, his Ansar-e Hezbollah, and the state-supported terrorism In nearly one-third of the slogans used during the protest in 1999, students demonstrated opposition to Khamenei directly. For example, the slogan "Khamenei! Shame on You, Leadership Is Not for You" is one a very daring statement and is considered one of the "boldest yet to be found in any demonstration in the last decade in Iran". These straight forward criticisms toward Khamenei, combined with slogans against the cleric rule and the "20-year" repression under the Islamic order, reflect the failed velayat-e faghih as a model of government in Iran.

In addition students involved in the protest revealed resentment toward the Ansar-e Hezbollah. This resentment deriving from violent intervention, disruption of political meetings, peaceful demonstrations and university lectures in support of the cleric and the supreme leader. According to Cyrus Bina, these types of "pressure groups are kept on the government's payroll and that their violence is often coordinated with the uniformed law enforcement forces against the public". Consequently, it is evident that during this time period conservatives constantly made efforts against liberals even through infliction of violence. The Iranian student demonstrations of July 1999 reveal the desperate need for reform. From research it is evident that the protest against the closure of the Daily Saleem resulted in a 6-day protest. That was motivated by a limited group. The demonstrations of July 1999 engaged students in politics, protesting against government corruption, political repression, the clerical rule and Khamenei. In the bigger picture, the students were protesting against the system of the Islamic Republic in Iran. In the end the protest was an act upon their needs for reform that was fueled during the election on May 23, 1997, in Iran.

=== Aftermath ===
A crackdown on reformists and reform policies followed the riots.

- A "long-negotiated compromise" that would have weakened the Council of Guardians to screening candidates for parliament and president was vetoed, giving the guardians "absolute vetting power".
- A "thought crime" law was passed prohibiting "any violent or peaceful act by a person or group against the regime" including speech, and punishing such criticism with stiff sentences.
- Another law prohibited "any contact or exchange of information, interviews or collusion with foreign embassies, organization, parties or media at whatever level which could be judged harmful to Iran's independence, national unity or the interests of the Islamic republic."

Several students and activists involved in the demonstration such as Manouchehr Mohammadi, Ahmad Batebi, Roozbeh Farahanipour, Farokh Shafiei, Hassan Zarezadeh Ardeshir, Khosrow Seif, Farzin Mokhber and Bahram Namazi were arrested. Of those students, Akbar Mohammadi died during a hunger strike while protesting against his prison sentence; Human Rights Watch called his death "suspicious" and demanded an investigation. Heshmat Tabarzadi, viewed by the Iranian government as one of the leaders of the protests, was arrested and spent nine years in Evin Prison, including two in solitary confinement. According to the Middle East Eye, a lecturer in the U.K argued that the impact of the 1999 student protests became apparent 10 years later during the 2009 Green Movement.

== 2009 anniversary protests ==
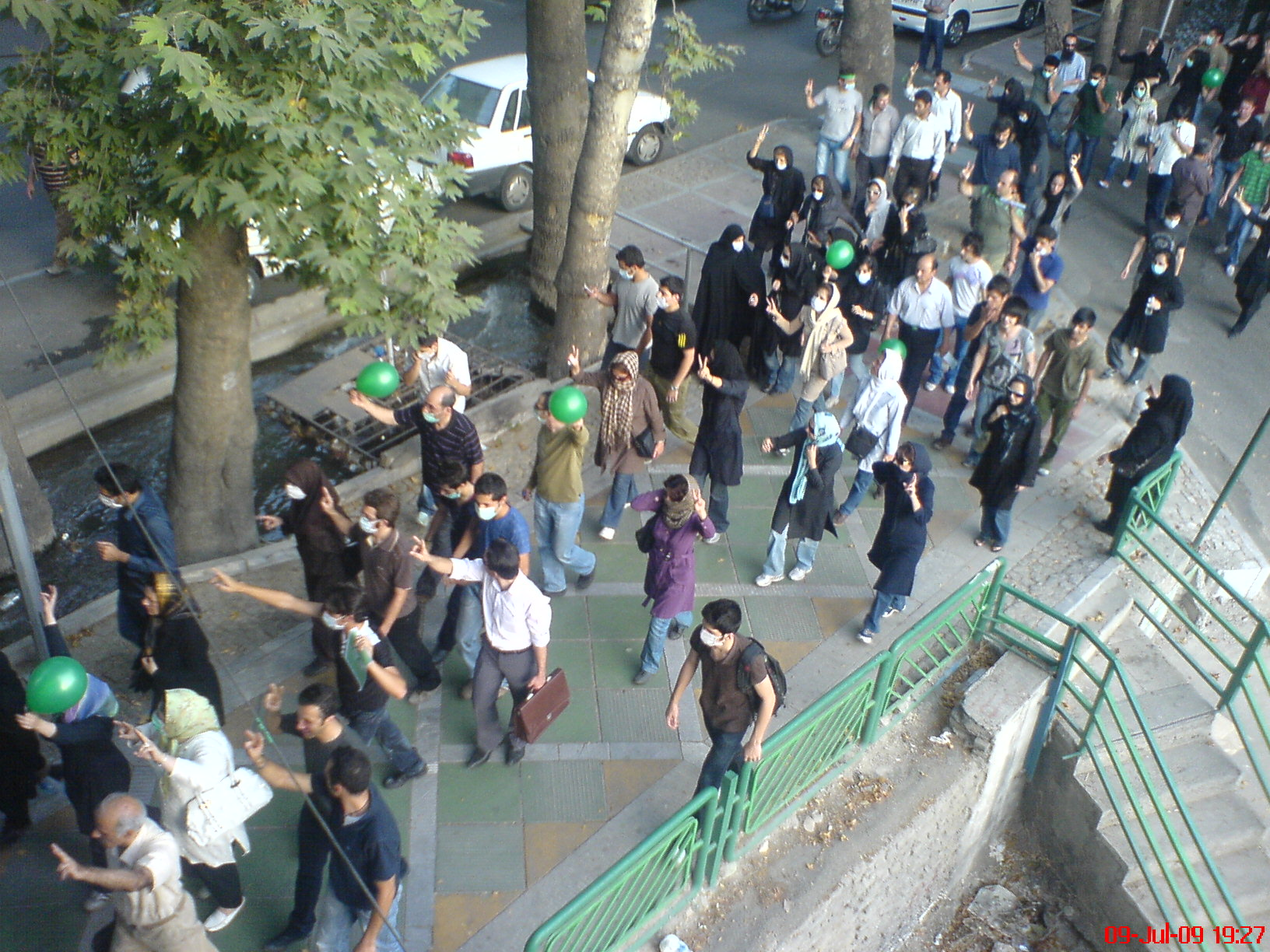
July 9, 2009, protest march in Tehran.

On 9 July 2009, "18 Tir" anniversary protests were scheduled for many cities in Iran and other cities worldwide. Time reported that thousands marched through the central districts of Tehran to commemorate the July 1999 student protests, and to protest the June 2009 presidential election.

Early on during the protest, Amnesty International reported: "At least 200 demonstrators are reported to have gathered along Enghlab Avenue, around the gates of Tehran University, only to be confronted by a large presence of anti-riot police and plain-clothed security officials, possibly including members of the notorious Basij militia, who used baton charges and tear gas to disperse them."

After dark, clashes continued and rubbish was set ablaze.

"The demonstrators made a moral point. They told the government in no uncertain terms they are still there and not going away," said an Iranian analyst who witnessed the mayhem.

The Australian reported: "The millions of Iranians who no longer dare to demonstrate have not gone away either. They are channelling their anger into a campaign of civil disobedience. Apart from shouting 'God is great' from their rooftops every night, they have started writing Mr Mousavi's name on banknotes, boycotting government banks and goods advertised on state television and turning on all their electrical appliances at the same time to try to overload the electricity grid."

== See also ==
- Evin Prison
- Human rights in Iran
- Political repression in the Islamic Republic of Iran
- Iranian reform movement
- Tabriz University's student movement, July 1999
- Pupil Day (Iran)
