= Mohammad Khatami's reforms =

Iranian government reforms (1997–2005)

Mohammad Khatami was elected as the President of Iran in 1997 after having based his campaign on a reform program promising implementation of a democratic and more tolerant society, the rule of law and improvement of social rights. After taking office, Khatami faced fierce opposition from his powerful opponents within the unelected institutions of the state which he had no legal power over, and this led to repeated clashes between his government and these institutions (including the Guardian Council, the state radio and television, the police, the armed forces, the judiciary, the prisons, etc.). After 8 years of presidency, he is widely considered to have lost the power struggle with his opponents. Many of his supporters have grown disillusioned with him and the reform programs that he was associated with.

== The reforms ==
The promotion of civil society and the rule of law are the key elements in Khatami's reform program.

- Initiating Iran's city council elections
- Voicing the idea of civil society and the rule of law
- Full commitment to Iranian constitution of the time (any revision in the law must be done through legal routes)
- Calling on people to criticize high-ranking authorities; (the supreme leader is not a holy personality)
- Giving permission to newspapers to express a wide range of political views
- Reopening the embassies of all European countries
- Reorganizing the ministry of intelligence of Iran; after the Iran's Chain Murders of Intellectuals
- Initiating a dialogue between people of different faith inside and outside Iran

== Major events ==
According to a famous statement made by Khatami, his government survived an average of one national crisis every nine days during his term of office. Highlights of important crises (related to his domestic reform plans) during his presidency include:

- The serial murders of Iranian political dissidents by rogue elements in the Intelligence Ministry.
- The beating of two of his closest allies and key cabinet ministers (Ataollah Mohajerani and Abdollah Noori) by Islamist pressure groups after a Friday prayer in Tehran.
- An unsuccessful attempt to impeach Khatami's culture minister (Ataollah Mohajerani) by the conservative-dominated 5th Majlis.
- The impeachment of Khatami's interior minister (Abdollah Noori) by the 5th Majlis which led to Noori's removal from office.
- Noori's trial and imprisonment on the grounds of insulting Islamic values.
- Iran student riots, July 1999. This was the second largest anti-regime street demonstrations after the 2009 Iranian Election Protests in the history of the Islamic Republic. At the time, students were considered to be the most important supporters of Khatami's government.
- The attempted assassination of Saeed Hajjarian, one of Khatami's closest allies and considered by many to be the mastermind strategist of the reform movement.
- The judiciary's verdict resulting in the closure of over 20 reformist newspapers in one day. This was considered by many to be the starting point of the reform movement's demise and was described by some political activists as the silent coup d'état against Khatami's government
- The failure of the "Twin Bills" (لوایح دوگانه in Persian). The bills were presented by Khatami to the 6th Majlis but after a long struggle they were eventually disapproved by the Guardian Council. These two pieces of proposed legislation would have introduced small but key changes to the national election laws of Iran and also presented a clear definition of the president's power to prevent constitutional violations by state institutions. Khatami himself described the "twin bills" as the key to the progress of reforms in Iran
- The imprisonment of many prominent figures of the reform movement and some of Khatami's key allies during his presidency by the judiciary on the grounds of insulting Islamic values. Some of these individuals are: Dr. Mohsen Kadivar, Gholamhossein Karbaschi, Ayatollah Hossein-Ali Montazeri, Mohsen Sazegara, Abbas Abdi, investigative journalists Akbar Ganji and Emadedin Baghi, etc.
- The trial and death sentence of Dr. Hashem Aghajari, a university professor and political activist accused of insulting Islamic values during one of his speeches. The death sentence was reversed after widespread protests by students and reformist parties. Dr. Aghajari was released after a brief stay in prison.

In September 2002 Khatami presented the so-called twin bills to Parliament. The twin bills addresses two issues: the first would curb the powers of the Council of Guardians, while the second would enhance presidential powers. The bills were rejected by Guardian council and Khatami withdrew them from the parliament eventually.

== Reform within the framework of Iranian constitution ==
=== Criticism ===
Khatami's desire to not make reforms out of the framework of Islamic Republic constitution, caused many people to question the outcome of his programs in areas such as implementation of a democratic society or women's rights. He has received criticism inside and outside the Islamic Republic.

During a speech at Tehran University, a group of his former supporters who had grown disillusioned with him chanted, " No more lies! ". Many of them had gotten physically beaten by police and other security forces before the meeting and were frustrated with Khatami's lack of action. According to Khatami,"[T]he reforms should come from within the regime. I consider the Islamic Republic to be a great achievement of the most popular revolution in my lifetime." Many of his supporter misunderstood this idea. With regard to those that were disillusioned with the epic of 23 May 1997, Khatami denounced a group that caused violence in the Iran student riots, July 1999 because of "their envy" and that they "created obstacles to implementation of the will of the people" referring to his opponents within the political establishment of the country. Additionally, he asserted,

Rest assured that beyond the Islamic Republic there will not be a democratic regime in the true sense of the word.

In the same vein, he has ridiculed the idea of "exporting" Western-style democracy in the Middle East,

It's a great joke - the greatest joke that Mr Bush said, that he would like to "export" democracy to the Middle East [referring to the fact that because of different cultural and historical backgrounds, democracy can only be achieved through a process unique to each culture and is therefore not something that can be 'exported'].

It seems that Khatami had commitment to reforming the systems. He tries to change the political currents of the country. At the same time he wants to add new controversial dimensions to the public discussions. Of course his administrations could not provide the wide range of social and political reforms promised. . The movement of 2nd khordad showed the last thread of ideology of Islamic republic in politics. This movement also insisted on the policymaking that Rafsanjani's state has established.

Khatami called Iranians for respecting the concept of Guardianship of the Islamic Jurists even if they do not believe in it. He reasoned that the concept is a part of Iranian constitution. A Paris-based analyst said,

When Mr. Khatami joins him, and worse, imitates him (Ali Khamenei), he loses his own power base.

According to the Iranian scholar, Azar Nafisi, "Khatami is a symptom and not the cause of change in Iran," .

Despite the fact that President Khatami was supportive of democratic reforms, Defenders of Human Rights Center which is Iran's main human rights organization, did not succeed in official registration and its qualification was not approved after three years of sending requests.

=== Defense ===
In his "letter for the future" President Khatami himself defended his government and his achievements. He wrote:

There have been changes of such an extent in social, cultural and political relations that it is impossible to return to the period of before the reforms.

President Khatami called for freedom of expression and asked people to publicly and openly criticize high-ranking politicians. Despite crackdown of the press by conservatives, Khatami succeeded in his plans to some extents. American journalist Ted Koppel who visited Iran in 2006, emphasized on the difference between Iran and other totalitarian regimes. In an interview Koppel said:

I have been over the years to many totalitarian countries as Soviet Union, China, Romania and North Vietnam. There is a sort of a feeling when you are in a totalitarian country. …that you can sense the moment you get off the plane. It’s almost like a hand around the throat ….People are very afraid to talk. ….That’s not Iran. By and large Iranians feel very free to talk, very free to criticize their president and our president … it is just a livelier place than what I was expected it to be. I guess that was the biggest surprise for me.

According to the political analyst and a former political prisoner, Hassan Yousefi Eshkevari, President Khatami's success can be listed as follows:

- His conviction in law and respect for law
- He remained faithful to his calls for abstaining from violence.
- Non-suppression of opponents and critics.
- The improvement of Iran's foreign relations and its image abroad.
- Honesty and sincerity.

In 2006, University of St Andrews Students’ Association fully backs the decision to grant President Khatami an honorary doctorate of law. After many discussions the association concluded that:

Khatami himself predominantly adopted a brave stance to promote liberal values in the face of great adversity. This personal courage, combined with his subsequent work in building interfaith dialogue and communication (notably through the Dialogue of Civilisations project), coupled with his notable achievements as a scholar, make him a very suitable candidate for such an award.

During his two terms in office, Khatami was able to introduce some reforms to the Iranian political system, however all in all, he is widely considered to have lost the power struggle with his opponents. The root cause for his failures is widely considered to be the limited powers of the President in the Iranian political system. As President, Khatami had little or no authority over many key state institutions such as the judiciary, the state radio and television, the armed forces including the police, the military, etc. (See Politics of Iran).

Some people criticise president Khatami for the mass closure of reformist newspapers by the press court during the first term of his presidency. These critics are unaware of the fact that not only Khatami had no control over the judiciary as president, but also that the judiciary was widely known to be controlled by hardline opponents of Khatami at the time.

Of course He tries to make in tune the Islamic government with the aspirations of Iranian people. However it can be said that the movement of Khatami was a continuation of two earlier movements namely constitutional revolution and Islamic revolution in 1979 against Pahlavi regime. These revolutions are welcoming to modernity.

=== Aims of 2nd khordad movement ===
Among his primary aims in politics were cases such as more personal freedom, social justice, privacy, tolerance, public participation in the interior affairs of state, consolidation of the rule of law, open and free press, establishment of political parties, transparency in accountability and end to corruption. The movement is to undertake remodeling of Islamic republic, modernizing its structure and rationalize the bureaucracy. In other word, the whole groups follow to change the policy making in all dimension.
