= Lily Mazahery =

American lawyer (born 1972)

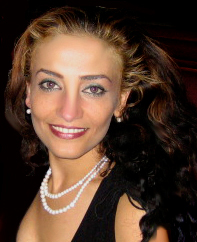
- Mazahery in 2007, Washington D.C.
- Born: October 10, 1972 (age 54); Tehran, Iran
- Occupations: Lawyer (disbarred), founder and president of the Legal Rights Institute, founder and principal of the Mazahery Law Firm
- Known for: Representing high profile political dissidents and victims of human rights abuse, international human rights activism

Lily Mazahery (Persian: لیلی مظاهری; born October 10, 1972) is an Iranian-American disbarred lawyer, formerly a human rights activist, and a source on Iran. She is principal of Mazahery Law Firm and the founder and president of Legal Rights Institute (LRI), a non-governmental organization (NGO).

== Overview ==
Mazahery received her Juris Doctor in 1999 and was admitted to the District of Columbia bar on December 2, 2002. She was disbarred in February 2014 for misrepresenting prominent human rights victims, including Ahmad Batebi.

Prior to her disbarment, Mazahery's practice primarily focused on immigration law. She assisted individuals who had been victims of human rights violations in Iran and other countries in North Africa, the Middle East, and Asia. Mazahery also advocated for equal rights for women in Islamic countries, including the abolishment of stoning as a form of execution and honour killings.

== Disbarment for ethical violations ==
On October 4, 2013, the Board of Professional Responsibility for the District of Columbia Court of Appeals recommended that the D.C. Court of Appeals disbar Mazahery and pay restitution in the amount of $3,241.92 plus interest for multiple acts of dishonesty stemming from her representation of human rights advocates Ahmad Batebi and Kianoosh Sanjari and mishandling of funds relating to the execution of Akram Mahdavi.

The Board found that Mazahery engaged in a "pattern of dishonesty" in these three matters and disclosed client secrets. The Board also found that Mazahery's "ethical violations are simply too serious, too numerous, and adversely affected too many people" and that she had made false statements to the bar, at her hearing, committed perjury and larceny in relation to handling funds intended for Batebi, evaded Sanjari and Batebi when they requested information about their asylum applications and committed deceit regarding donations intended for Mahdavi. In February 2014, Mazahery consented to the disbarment and was subsequently disbarred.

== See also ==
- List of Iranian women
- Persian women's movement
- Human rights in Iran
