= Abbas Abdi =

Iranian reformist and journalist (born 1956)

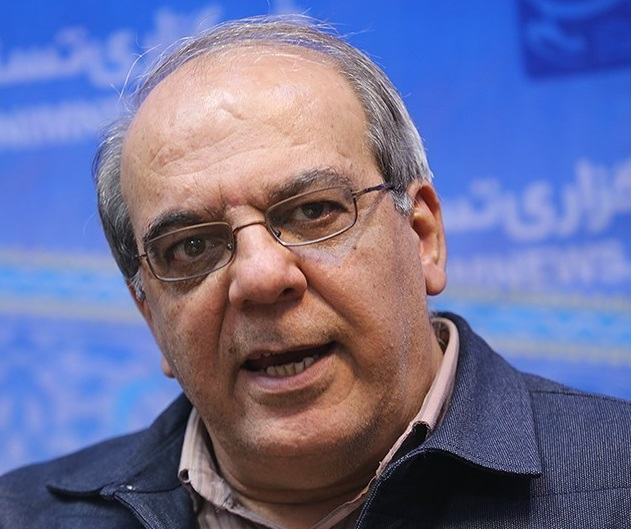
- Abdi in 2016
- Born: 1 October 1956 (age 69); Tehran, Imperial State of Iran
- Education: Amir Kabir University
- Occupations: Journalist; social researcher; human rights activist
- Known for: Editor-in-chief of Salam daily newspaper
- Political party: Union of Islamic Iran People Party

Abbas Abdi (/ɑːˈboʊseɪ ɑːbˈdiː/; Persian: عباس عبدی; born 1 October 1956) is an Iranian reformist. He is also a journalist, self-taught sociologist, and social activist.

== Biography ==
Abbas Abdi was born in 1956. He studied polymer engineering at Tehran Polytechnic. He worked briefly in the foreign intelligence department of the Prime Minister's Office of Research and Information and served as the cultural deputy in the Center for Strategic Research under the president's office. He was a member of the editorial board of the daily Salam. Abdi was a member of central council of Iran Participation Front, and is currently the chairman of the Association of Iranian Journalists.

He was the first person to storm the United States embassy in Tehran, along with other students, during the early years of the Iranian Revolution in 1979. In the following years, he became a critic of the political establishment of Iran. In 1993, he was imprisoned for eight months due to his critical writings in the reformist daily, Salam. He was a supporter of President Mohammad Khatami's reform plans, and one of the most influential figures in the reformist camp after 1997. He ran into legal trouble after the Iran student protests, July 1999 following the invasion of Tehran University dormitories, in which the police attacked the dormitory of the university because of student protests following Abdi's article in Salam.

Abdi became the director of the Ayandeh polling organization and participated in a poll asking Iranians if they supported resuming government dialogue with the United States. On 22 September 2002 the official news agency IRNA published an Ayandeh poll indicating that 74.4% of Iranians favored a resumption of ties with the United States. Abdi was arrested at his home on 4 November 2002, accused of "having received money from either the US polling firm Gallup or a foreign embassy". Abdi spent several years in prison as a result. In the 2009 presidential election, he was one of the key advisors to Mehdi Karroubi.

== See also ==
- Human rights in Islamic Republic of Iran
- 2nd of Khordad Movement
