= Society of Students Against Poverty =

Iranian student NGO

Society of Students Against Poverty (Imam Ali's Popular Students Relief Society), (Persian: جمعیت امام علی, Jameeat-e-Imam Ali) is the first nonpartisan, student NGO in Iran founded in 1999 and had its first official office in Sharif University in 2000. The major activities are tending to social problems, with focus on issues related to children. Since 2010 the NGO is a member of United Nations Economic and Social Council.

The founder of the Imam Ali's Popular Students Relief Society Sharmin Meymandi Nejad, is the initiator of Intelligent Charity.

Intelligent Charity Organization means an organization in which all the members are like a body, they evaluate the circumstances especially in social problems and present solutions in every case. Solutions are given by the university students who have expertise and knowledge in the case they work on. The solutions are based on students’ theory and domain researches and include planning and timetables.

The main field of activity of this community is to work on children related social issues, such as orphan children, runaway children, Juvenile delinquency, child labor, sick children and also with poor families (mostly in relation to their children)

== Committees ==
Health Committee: both prevention and cure for the families under control.
Social Committee: dealing with family pathology like child harassment, selling children, family addiction...
Education Committee: educating and cheering children, and helping the best of them in their supplemental education.
Culture and art Committee: improving the cultural level of the children and families
Employment Committee: Finding job opportunities and making employment for family members

== Major organization’s programs ==
=== Rahyaft-e-Darooni ===
Sharmin is the professor of organization's tutorial classes called “Rahyaft”.

Sharmin Meymandi Nejad, The founder of the organization

=== Koochegardan-e-Ashegh ===
Koochegardan is the most famous activity of the organization. This national-religious ceremony, runs every Ramadan. In this program, students gather needful materials for the poor families from their universities. And on the 21st night of Ramadan, Laylat al-Qadr (Night of Power, or Decree) and the night of the martyrdom of Imam Ali, they give all the gathered materials to the needy people.

Koochegardan started in 1999 in Tehran and continued to this date. The latest Koochegardan took place in October 2006, in Tehran, Kermanshah, Zanjan, Zabol,... The 2006 program gave away about 5000 packages of materials.

Iran Supreme Leader, Ayatollah Khamenei at the speech of Eid ul-Fitr named this activity and praised their effort . khamenei.ir.

=== The 1st Cancer seminar (about children) ===
The seminar took place in Sharif University, Shahid Beheshti University and The Dialogue Between Civilizations Center, for 5 days in 1999.

=== Children of love festival (Jashnvare Farzandan-e-Mehr) ===
The festival consisted of three sections: short films, movie dramas and theater.

=== Birth of Jesus Christ ceremony (Jashn-e-Milad-e-Masih) ===
In January 2000, and 2001, the organization celebrated the birth of Jesus Christ with attendance of Christian members and with the purpose of respecting the love of Jesus Christ toward human being and also to emphasis on organization's view toward all religions’ objectives, which is to love people and make a better society.

On December 22, 2006, the ceremony took place again. Father Kishishian and Sharmin Meymandi Nejad gave speeches on Christianity and Islam and the religious part in helping people.

=== Iran 1130 ===
Iran 1130, is a plan to make the candidates of Iranian presidential election, build a village in their election campaigns instead of heavily spending on paper ads and the like.

=== Teflan-e-Moslem ===
According to the 2005 conference about the condition of Iranian children, held by the first big brother society, a seminar took place in Tehran Juvenile Correction & Rehabilitation Center in the holy month of Muharram in the year 2007, with the aim to free some of the children who were there because of money.

== Other activities ==
Praying ceremonies - Street Children (The seminar in Alzahra University in March 1999) - Little teachers of love (Yadvare-e-Moalleman-e-Koochak-e-Eshgh) – Interpretation of Quran – Nurse day ceremony (in Ali Asghar Hospital) – Toy festival (one week program in Koohsangi park in Mashhad, with the assistance of Ferdowsi University of Mashad in September 2001) – Celebration of Love (Jashn-e-Mehr, in October 2001 in University of Tabriz) – Helping the people of Bam, following the earthquake - Protest against the condition of the Iraqi children during the war in April 2003, at UN center in Tehran.

Haji Firooz in hospital - one of the programs in which haji firooz give presents to the children in the hospitals

Children's theatre performance in one of the celebrations

In a special ceremony, the children with the best marks in school receive presents
