= Saeed Zeinali =

Iranian activist (born 1976)

- Born: 22 September 1976
- Disappeared: Probably after 2002
- Education: University of Tehran
- Occupation: Student
- Known for: Political prisoner, 1999-present
- Mother: Akram Neghabi

Saeed Zeinali (Persian: سعید زینالی; born 22 September 1976) is an Iranian student at Tehran University who was arrested on 10 July 1999, 5 days after the 1999 Iranian student protests. He was 23 years old.

== Disappearance ==
He was imprisoned in the notorious Evin Prison in Tehran at least until 2002. Three months after his arrest he was allowed to make a phone call to his family, but they have not heard about him since. Security forces and Evin prison officials refuse to publish any information about him.

== Aftermath ==
On 9 July 2013, the anniversary of the event hold at Tehran University, Saeed Zeinali's mother Akram Neghabi said that a judiciary official has promised to help her.

On 2019, after 21 years, Amnesty International wanted to clarify the status of detained student Saeed Zeinali and wrote on its Twitter: "Two decades have passed since the forced disappearance of student activist Saeed Zinali. Amnesty International stands by his suffering family to realize truth and justice."

== See also ==
- List of people who disappeared mysteriously: post-1970
