= Ezzat Ebrahim-Nejad =

Iranian activist (1975-1999)

- Born: 1975
- Died: July 9, 1999 (aged 23–24); Tehran, Iran
- Occupation: Lawyer
- Known for: 1999 murder

Ezzat Ebrahim-Nejad (also Ezzat Ebrahimnejad) was an Iranian student, poet and demonstrator who was shot and killed in the attack by security forces on a Tehran University dormitory that preceded and provoked the July 1999 student protests in Iran.

Several other students were beaten and injured in the attack and some police were later brought to trial, but no trial has been held for Ebrahim-Nejad's killer, who according to witnesses was a lebas-shakhsi, or plainclothesman, a "shorthand" term for "paramilitary forces in civilian clothes". According to Iranian human rights activist Shirin Ebadi, it was Ebrahim-Nejad who was the owner of the blood-stained shirt held aloft by Ahmad Batebi in a celebrated photo which appeared on the cover of The Economist magazine in 1999.

== Life ==
In 1998, he graduated from the Shahid Chamran University of Ahvaz School of Law.

Shirin Ebadi, who worked as Ebrahim-Nejad family's pro bono lawyer, described Ebrahim-Nejad as "talented, hardworking, and ambitious" and his father as willing "to sell his small house in the provinces to hire a lawyer to pursue his son's killers". The family also complained to Ebadi of harassment – having stones thrown at them by vigilantes when they attempted to visit their son's grave and being barred from government offices in the wake of the tragedy.

Ezzatollah Ebrahim-Nejad was fulfilling his military service at the IRGC Joint Staff in Tehran when he visited friends at the University of Tehran’s Kuye Daneshgah dormitory; consequently, he was present at the complex during the raid on the student dormitories. His brother recountsed the circumstances of the killing as follows:

"The Ansar-e Hezbollah forces would retreat, regroup, and then attack again. To describe exactly how Ezzat was killed, I must mention that we actually summoned the person who dealt the fatal blow to court; unfortunately, the court did not accept the accusation against him, though we stand by our claim. When Ezzat was struck, he was among the students right in front of the dormitory’s main gate. At one point, they dragged him aside—three or four individuals swarmed him—and students watching from a distance saw them pounce on Ezzat, beating him with batons and chains. Because his ankle was already broken, when his body was recovered, we found fractures in his thigh, his shoulder blade, and both arms. There is actual video footage of this. His entire back was covered in marks from the chains. When the students saw the assault, they suddenly rushed in to intervene. Unfortunately, they acted a bit too late; one of the assailants drew a weapon and fired directly at Ezzat’s head from a distance of just one meter—the bullet struck his left eye and penetrated his brain. This happened at exactly ten minutes to seven."

Following his death, he was posthumously convicted by the Revolutionary Court of acting against national security due to his participation in protests, chanting slogans, and resisting Ansar-e Hezbollah forces. The publication of an offensive post on Masoud Dehnamaki’s personal blog prompted Ezzatollah Ebrahim-Nejad’s family to release information regarding his death, implicating Dehnamaki and Mehdi Safari-Tabar—the son of the Friday Prayer Imam of Eslamshahr—in the killing:

"On 9 July 1999, you lured Ezzat—alone and unaccompanied—into a corner; you and your friends struck him down with knives and chains, and ultimately, you finished him off with a 'coup de grâce'—a shot fired by Mehdi Safari-Tabar (the son of the Eslamshahr Friday Prayer Imam and a Revolutionary Guard commander) into Ezzat’s left temple and eye... Although we stood alone then—as we do now—and lacked the power to drag you into the July 9th court proceedings, rest assured that God will summon you to His own court; there, you will find no Supreme Leader, no Revolutionary Guard, and no one to exonerate you."

According to Ebadi, after much delay over who had jurisdiction over Ezzat's case, the revolutionary court dismissed it "since no people had officially been charged and since Ezzat was dead anyway."

In 2009, it was reported that his grave at Behesht-e Zahra had been replaced, removing his cause of death.

== See also ==
- List of unsolved murders (1980–1999)
