= Akbar Mohammadi (student) =

Iranian political activist (1969–2006)

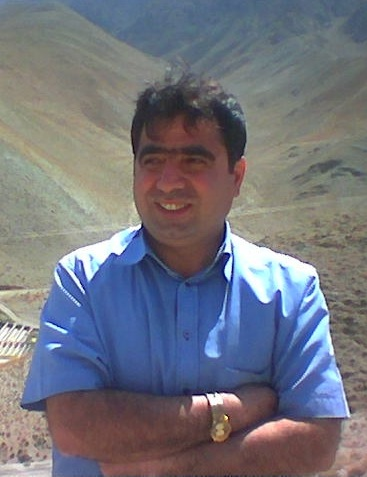
- Born: 30 May 1969; Amol, Pahlavi Iran
- Died: 30 July 2006 (aged 37); Evin prison, Tehran, Iran
- Known for: Imprisonment after July 1999 Iranian Student Protests and died at Evin prison due to hunger strike.

Akbar Mohammadi (Persian: اکبر محمدی; 30 May 1969 – 30 July 2006) was an Iranian student at Tehran University involved in the 18th of Tir crisis, also known as the July 1999 Iran student protests, Iran's biggest pro-democracy demonstrations since the 1979 Islamic Revolution. He later died at Evin prison, causing an international outcry.

== Background and imprisonment ==
Akbar Mohammadi was from the city of Amol in northern Iran. The son of Muhammad Mohammadi, Akbar had a brother, Manuchehr, and a sister, Simin. During the July 1999 protests, Manuchehr was arrested and accused of taking a "leading role". Apparently due to his connection with Manuchehr, Akbar was also arrested and reportedly given a death sentence for his role in the protest. In an appeal in November 2000, Akbar's sentence was reduced to seven years' imprisonment. Three years later, an additional two years were added to Akbar's sentence following charges that he had given interviews to foreign media and made "political statements".

Akbar and Manuchehr's family was for sometime unaware of their location. When the family discovered that Akbar and Manuchehr had been arrested, their father Muhammad and their sister Simin began to lobby on their behalf; both were themselves arrested and sent to Evin prison, with Simin reportedly being beaten before her father.

== Death ==
On 30 July 2006, Akbar Mohammadi died in Evin prison. He had been on a hunger strike for more than a week, reportedly protesting the refusal by the authorities to allow him to seek medical treatment for injuries suffered as a result of torture. Mr. Mohammadi's attorney, Khalil Bahramian, said that according to fellow detainees of his client, he "had been savagely beaten by prison guards in the past few days and that he was carrying the signs of the beatings".

Mohammadi's death caused an international outcry. On 3 August 2006, Human Rights Watch called on the Iranian government to allow an "independent investigation into the suspicious death in prison of student activist Akbar Mohammadi". This call was supported by hundreds of leading Iranian personalities and groups.

== See also ==
- Zahra Kazemi
- Saeed Mortazavi
- Mahmoud Hashemi Shahroudi
- Human rights in Iran
