= Ali Sharifi Zarchi =

Iranian academic

- Occupation: Chair of the Scientific Committee of the International Olympiad in Informatics
- Known for: Political activism

Ali Sharifi-Zarchi is an Iranian academic in bioinformatics, machine learning, and artificial intelligence, known for his activism during and after the 2022-2023 protests in Iran. He was an assistant professor of bioinformatics at the Department of Computer Engineering at Sharif University of Technology and the chair of the scientific committee of the International Olympiad in Informatics.

He was dismissed from the faculty of Sharif University of Technology in September 2023 for publicly expressing support for the protest movement and criticizing government actions, but later returned at the beginning of the following academic year following a government review of dismissed students and professors.. He was expelled from Sharif University for the second time and he no longer is affiliated with the university.

A court in Iran's central Yazd province announced in March 2026 that it had confiscated assets belonging to Sharifi Zarchi, as part of a crackdown on those accused of siding with the US and Israel in the 2026 Iran War.

== Personal life ==
Sharifi Zarchi was a member of Iran's national student team at the 2000 International Olympiad in Informatics, where he won a gold medal. He holds a bachelor's and master's degree in computer engineering from Sharif University of Technology and a PhD in bioinformatics from the University of Tehran. He also completed research and postdoctoral work at the Max Planck Society in Germany and a state university in the United States. Since 2011, he has been a bioinformatics researcher at the Royan Institute and, since 2016, a faculty member at Sharif University of Technology.

== Activism ==
Ali Sharifi-Zarchi became widely recognized for his activism during the nationwide 2022-2023 protests in Iran. His activism is closely associated with his public criticism of the Iranian government, his support for protest movements, and his calls for accountability regarding state actions.

In a public statement rejecting the authority of Supreme Leader Ali Khamenei, he wrote on X "Ali Khamenei is not my leader."

His statements have called for global engagement in response to human rights concerns, and to take action against the "brutal regime." He has also highlighted the plight of Iranians living under an ongoing internet blackout, describing his decision to remain abroad as an effort to serve as a voice for those inside the country.

== Dismissal from the university ==
During the 2022-2023 Iranian protests, Sharifi-Zarchi was among the critics of the Iranian government's policies and the ongoing security pressure on students and universities. He was summoned by the Ministry of Intelligence of Iran, where they presented him with a folder of all his X posts, leading to his dismissal in September 2023. A student-led petition gathered over 13,000 signatures opposing his expulsion. He was later reinstated. However, he was dismissed for a second time in 2026 and is no longer affiliated with Sharif University of Technology. Zarchi declared on X that all his students and courses he used to offer, were assigned to his former colleagues.

== Exile ==
As a result of his activism, he faced pressure and potential risk of repercussions from authorities. This led to concerns about his safety and ability to continue working freely in Iran. After receiving confirmation from Iran's judicial system that he could face arrest, he decided not to return to the country. He is currently living in exile after aligning himself with protesters during the 2025 Iranian uprising, where slogans called for the end of the Islamic Republic of Iran and the return of the Pahlavi dynasty. He was in Iran when the protests began but had left to attend a training camp for gold medalists of the International Olympiad in Informatics in China when tensions escalated and decided not to return.

Sharifi-Zarchi has said that many of his friends in Iran are awaiting international action, and that the majority of his contacts inside the country can only connect intermittently due to restrictions and internet disruptions. While abroad, he learned of the violent crackdown unfolding during the protests, including reports of widespread casualties. Among those killed in the protests was his close friend, Parsa Saffar, a medical student from Mashhad, who was shot dead during demonstrations. Sharifi-Zarchi described him as a brave and brilliant student.

His assets were seized by Iran’s judiciary on March 26, 2026, with authorities describing him as "anti-Iran".
