= Sharmin Meymandi Nejad =

Iranian writer, playwright, director

Sharmin Meymandi Nejad شارمین میمندی نژاد
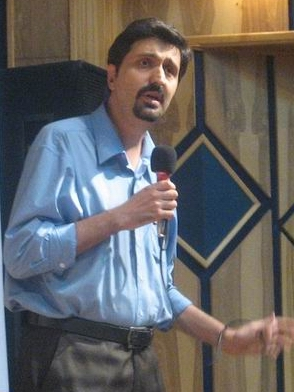
- Born: March 30, 1970 (age 56); Tehran, Iran
- Education: University of Tehran
- Occupations: Theatre director, Playwright, Humanitarian, Researcher, Founder of the Society of Students Against Poverty
- Spouse: Zahra Rahimi
- Parent(s): Mohammad Hossein Meymandi Nejad (father), Fateme Lord (mother)

Sharmin Meymandi Nejad (/ʃɑːrˈmiːn meɪmænˈdi neˈʒɑːd/ Persian: شارمین میمندی نژاد born March 30, 1970, in Tehran) is an acclaimed Iranian writer, playwright, director and researcher of social sciences. Meyamandi Nejad is mostly known for being the founder of Society of Students Against Poverty (IAPSRS). An NGO which is mainly dedicated to children's and women's right.

== Early life and academic background ==
His father, Professor Mohammad Hossein Meymandi Nejad, was a famous scientist and author of more than 100 books and his mother was Fateme Lord.

After finishing Highschool, in 1991 Maymandi Nejad attained a perfect score on the universities entrance exam and was admitted to the Faculty of Fine Arts at University of Tehran, from which he gained a B.A in dramatic arts. Following this, he continued his graduate studies at the same university in dramatic literature. He eventually graduated in 1998.

== Works ==
=== Plays ===
Since the beginning of his academic education, Sharmin took an interest in writing plays and soon he became one of the most acclaimed young playwrights in Iran. Sharmin made his writer-director debut in 1993, with the critically well-received play called Mehr-e-Giah. This play was held for 45 days in Charsoo Hall in City Theater in Tehran (Shahr Theater). At that time, Charsoo Hall was only allocated to recognized directors. Therefore, this very first job made Maymandi Nejad very famous among his colleagues.

Sharmin wrote and directed several other plays including:

- Dorj-e-Meshkin: 1994, writer-director, charsoo hall
- Ahh! Sooske aziz salam! (Ahh! Hello Dear Beetle!): 1995, writer-director, Molavi hall, Student Theater festival
- Akharin Navadeye Namrood (The Last Descendant of Namrood): 1995, writer-director, Theatre Shahr hall no.2, Special Part Fadjr International Theater Festival
- Naghle Ghole Aasheghan (Citation of Lovers): 1995, writer, Theatre Shahr Main hall
- Ghesseye Eshgh (Love Story): 1996, writer, Tarbiat Modarres University Hall
- Hameye Farzandane Khorshid (All the Children of the Sun): writer-director, Theatre Shahr hall no.2, Special Part Fadjr International Theater Festival

=== University lectures ===
He held theatre-therapy classes from 1996 to 1999 in Alzahra University and workshops on hypnosis and its application in helping children diagnosed with cancer.

Sharmin lectured from 2004 to 2006 at Islamic Azad University of Art & Architecture. At the same time, he taught Basics of Acting at University of Tehran's Fine Arts College.

=== Books ===
==== Published ====
- Mehr-e-Giah – Play – 1999 – Jahad Daneshgahi
- All the Children of the Sun – Play – 2000 – Namira Publication
- Contemporary Iranian Literature – Selected Plays – 2001 – Neyestan Publication
- Dorj-e-Meshkin – Play – 2003 – Golpar Publication
- When Alladin had No Magic Lantern and the Tales of Old Shahrzad in New York – Play – 2004 – Namira Publication
- The Secret of Sultan's Harem – Play – 2005 – Namira Publication
- Museum of Death – Novel – 2009 – Albourzfar Danesh Publication

==== Ready to Publish ====
- Pathway of the Prophets – Collection of letters
- The Inverse of a Butterfly is a Butterfly – Novel
- Apocalypse of Shahrzad – Play
- Teymoor Shah – Play
- Children of Helle – Screenplay

=== Awards ===
- 2003 - Center of Dialogue among civilizations Prize
- 2005 - First Prize for playwriting in Biennial Drama Festival

=== Researches ===
- Ways of Teaching Theater to Orphan Children and its Therapeutic Influence – 1995 – Shahid Ghoddoosi Behzisti
- Linguistic and Symbols in Divine Books – 1999
- Typology of spurious jobs of children - 2014 - child labour in Iran seminar in University of Tehran
- Philosophy of Romani people – 2016

== Humanitarian Works ==
Sharmin founded an NGO called Imam Ali Popular Students Relief Society, also known as the Society of Students Against Poverty. This NGO is now (2021) active all around the country, with more than 10,000 volunteers serving more than 6,800 women and children. The Imam Ali Society is also active in Iraq and Afghanistan.

=== Society of Students Against Poverty ===
Society of Students Against Poverty(Imam Ali Society), is the first nonpartisan, student NGO in Iran. It was founded in 1999 and had its first official office in Sharif University of Technology in 2000. The major activities are focused on social issues, especially ones affecting children. It has 44 centres in deprived areas and slums all over the country where working children and underprivileged women benefit from medical and educational services, including literacy, languages, art and music, sports, etc. There are also different projects and seminars held frequently designed based on the national and religious ceremonies. These projects are trying to create a tie between ceremonies and social volunteering movements.

=== Rahyaft ===
In 1996, Sharmin started teaching a series of classes called "Rahyafti Be Daroun"(Acceding Inside) in Sharif University. The main goal of these classes is to help other people with the knowledge, experience and exercises in the process of studying these syllabuses in order to train altruistic, committed and pragmatist social activists who are effectively active in solving social issues.

This class is now being held as a course for new members to help them integrate with Imam Ali society as a charity.

Sharmin Meymandi Nejad is the initiator of Smart Charity in Iran. A Smart Charity Organization refers to a system in which all members act with a holistic approach where they consider the issues as symptoms and evaluate the real causes. Finally, they present solutions to lead charitable activities towards eliminating the root causes in every case. These solutions are given by university students with case-related expertise and are developed based on students' theoretical and experimental researches.

Rahyaft covers the following syllabus:

1. Theology, vases and origins of the world's live religions
2. Cosmology, origin and initiation of the world in accordance with religions and science.
3. Sociology
4. Psychology
5. Philosophy
6. Linguistics, the origin of different languages, comparison of eastern and western languages, and the effect of the language on the way we think.
7. Mythology
8. History of religion
9. Social work
10. Symbols, tt will be possible if we stop word-thinking and begin to concentrate our attention on the symbols and concepts.
11. Healing methods

=== Saving teenagers sentenced to death ===
Since 2006, Sharmin has actively helped young offenders. In this regard, he started collaborating with Tehran Penitentiary Center and reviewed the judiciary cases of children and teenagers in that centre. During a period till 2008, 70 teenagers were released through "Teflan-e-Moslem" program of the Society of Students Against Poverty some of whom were arrested on felony charges and were sentenced to death. later, Sharmin trained some social workers of Imam Ali Society and formed a team for "Teflan-e-Moslem" program. This team has saved 50 teenagers from execution ever since.

=== Theater for disadvantaged children ===
Sharmin has written and directed plays with social themes in order to raise awareness about social issues. These plays have been Performed by underprivileged children. Some of these plays are:

Teymour: 2011, writer-director, House of arts of Imam Ali Society
Haftomin barkhoon khane Rostam (7th bloody passage of Rostam): 2013, writer-director, Social and Cultural Student Center of University of Tehran
Tasmime jome siahe Kobra (The decision of Kobra on the Dark Friday): 2014, writer-director, House of arts of Imam Ali Society
Ejdeha bar doush (ِSerpent on shoulder): 2015, writer-director, Milad tower Conference Hall
Gharibkhani: 2016, writer, University of Zanjan, Mazandaran University of Medical Sciences, Artistic forum of Sari, and University of Isfahan

== Detention ==
On July 2, 2019, the Society of Students Against Poverty (IAPSRS) announced that the security forces arrested the founder of the organization, Sharmin Meymandi Nejad, at his home.

=== Statement ===
After the arrest of the founder and two members of this organization, IAPSRS stated in a statement that they were arrested with the complaint of the IRGC's Thar-Allah Headquarters and on charges of "insulting the leader and founder of the Islamic Republic" and "acting against national security".

=== United Nations statement ===
United Nations High Commissioner for Human Rights Michelle Bachelet on Thursday, August 9, in a statement, expressed great concern about the threats against the Society of Students Against Poverty and called for the release of Sharmin Meymandi Nejad as soon as possible. She stated in this statement that it seems that the purpose of the pressure on this NGO is to try to close it down. Bachelet said that this organization had recently criticized the authorities calling people affected by poverty "troublemakers" following the protests in Iran in November 2018.

=== Freedom ===
After 129 days of detention, Sharmin Meymandi Nejad was released on Tuesday evening, November 6, 2019, with a bail of 2 billion Tomans.
