= Ahmad Batebi =

Iranian activist

- احمد باطبی
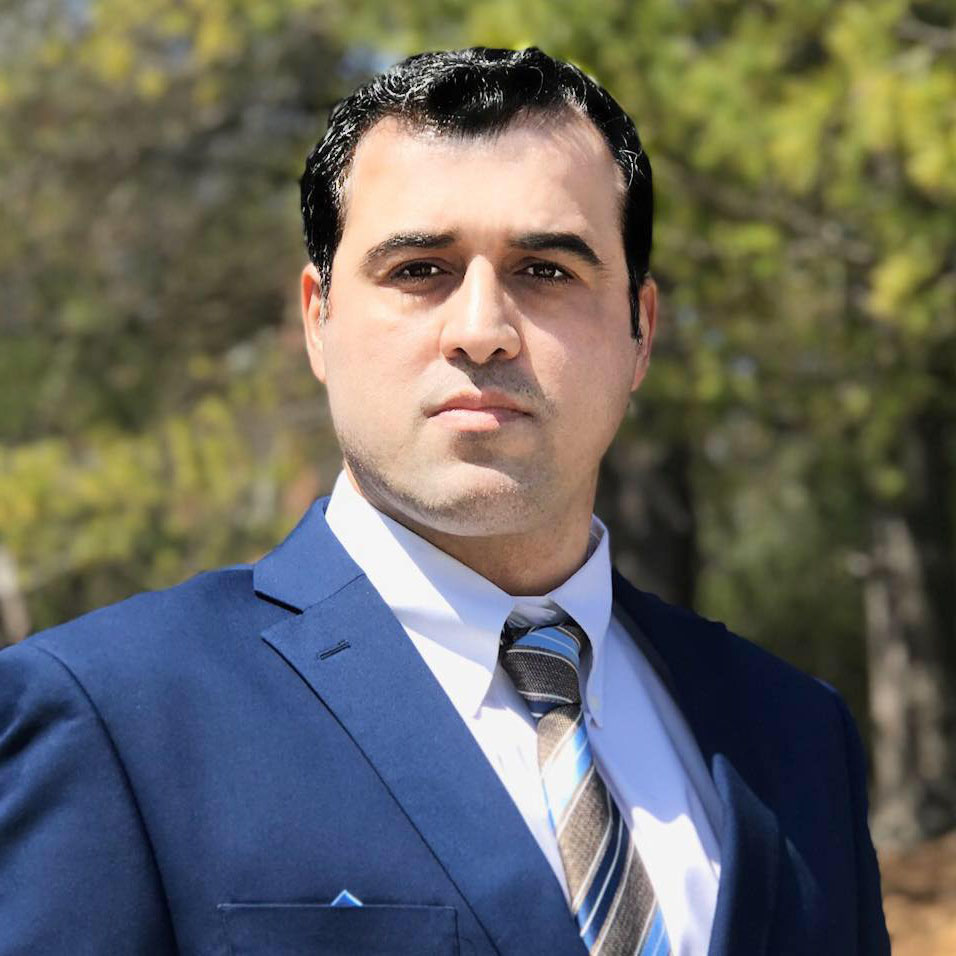
- Born: July 25, 1977 (age 49); Shiraz, Iran
- Citizenship: Iran, America
- Education: P.h.D of Cybersecurity
- Occupation: Spokesperson for the Human Rights Activists in Iran
- Known for: Imprisonment after July 1999 Iranian Student Protests
- Height: 192 cm (6 ft 4 in)
- Criminal charges: Action against national security
- Criminal penalty: Execution, 15 years prison
- Website: www.ahmadbatebi.com

Ahmad Batebi (Persian: احمد باطبی; born July 25, 1977) is an Iranian activist who was designated a prisoner of conscience by Amnesty International. During his studies at the University of Tehran he gained international fame for his appearance on the July 17, 1999, cover of The Economist magazine, holding up a shirt splattered with the blood of a fellow protester.

The photo, which has been called "an icon for Iran's student reform movement", was taken during the Iranian Student Protests in July 1999 in Tehran. Following its publishing, Batebi was arrested, tried in closed-door proceedings, found guilty of "creating street unrest", and sentenced to death.

This was reduced to 15 years after domestic and international outcry. Less well-known are persistent reports of torture and ill-treatment of Batebi in prison and his resulting poor physical and mental health. While temporarily released from prison to receive medical attention, Batebi was assisted by the KDPI, to flee Iran for Iraq. He finally entered the United States on June 24, 2008, on humanitarian parole. He was then granted asylum status by the United States government.

== The protest ==
The student protests of 1999 began on July 7 with peaceful demonstrations in Tehran against the closure of the reformist newspaper, Salam. This was followed by an attack on a student dormitory that night by vigilantes and riot police in which a student was killed. This sparked six days of demonstrations and rioting in which at least three more people were killed and more than 200 injured.

A photojournalist for Jame'e newspaper, Jamshid Bayrami, took the Economist cover photo then. In the photograph, Batebi waves a bloody T-shirt above his head.

The shirt belonged to the student standing next to Batebi, who had been shot. "The bullet hit the wall and ricocheted back into my friend's shoulder. I heard the bullet go by my face," Batebi recalled. "It sounded like a bumblebee going by my ear."

To staunch the bleeding, Batebi removed his friend's shirt to put pressure on the wound. He then helped transport his friend to a medical facility. Returning to the protest with the bloody shirt, he displayed it to the protesters to warn them of the shooting.

== Trial and prison life ==
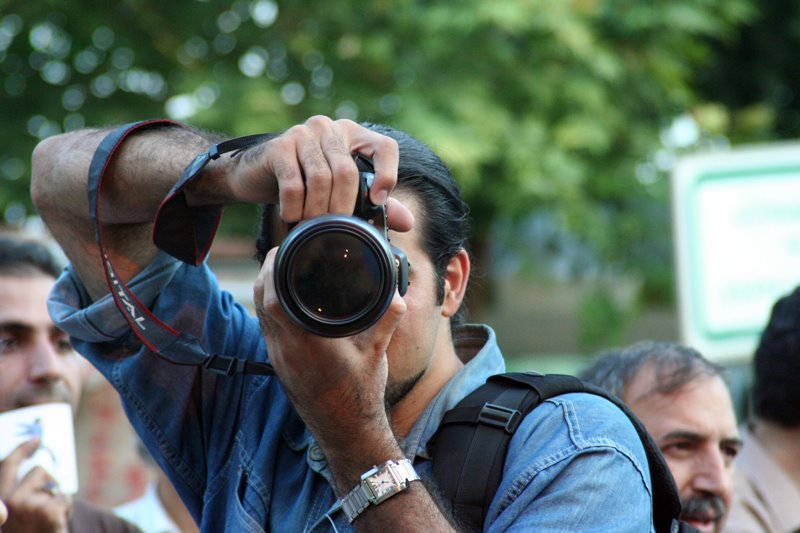
Batebi as a photojournalist at University of Tehran

Batebi was initially arrested in connection with the protests several days after the publication of the Economist photograph. He was held without charges for about seven months when he was brought to trial. At the trial, the judge showed Batebi the Economist photograph. It was the first time he had seen it.

"With this picture, you have signed your death sentence," Batebi recalls the judge told him. Batebi describes the trial as follows:

"[The judge] said, 'You have defaced the face of the Islamic Republic that represents God on earth. You have defaced it around the world. And therefore, you have to be sentenced to death.' It took less than three minutes."

He and many other protesters were brutally tortured. In prison, Batebi wrote of beatings by guards:

I resisted and punched one of them in the face. At this point, they took me and ducked my head into a closed drain full of excrement. They held me under for so long I could not hold my breath any longer, and excrement was inhaled through my nose and seeped into my mouth.
During the interrogations, they threatened several times to execute me and to torture and rape my family members as well as imprison them for long terms.

He was one of four people who received a death sentence in a closed-door trial by a Revolutionary Court on charges relating to "creating street unrest" and "agitating people to create unrest," and "endangering national security" following the demonstrations. Batebi, in an open letter addressed to the judiciary, wrote that he had been beaten in his "testicles, legs, and abdominal area. When I protested, they answered that this is the land of the Velayat and that I should be blinded and not live here."

Following an outcry from Iranians and international human rights groups, his death sentence was commuted to a 15-year prison term by Iran's Supreme Leader, Ayatollah Khamenei. Upon appeal in early 2000, the sentence was further reduced to 10 years.

Around March 2005, Batebi was temporarily released from Evin Prison to get married. He failed to report back to prison. On June 23, 2005, a newspaper interview reported him "currently on the run, avoiding the authorities in Iran". Batebi was re-arrested on July 27, 2006, and re-imprisoned. He continued to serve his sentence. However, his family was not told where he was detained until August 12, 2006, when he was permitted to telephone his wife.

He was held in Section 209 of Evin Prison, which is run by the Ministry of Intelligence.

During a hunger strike in August 2006, "his doctor wrote an open letter to the prison authorities" stating that Batebi "required specialist care", and that "there was a risk he could die if he was not released." Also adding to the fears for his life was the fate of another July 1999 protester, Akbar Mohammadi, who died in custody under suspicious circumstances in July 2006.

By September 20, 2006, his relatives were permitted to visit him in prison thrice. During their first two visits, Batebi's family was accompanied by four prison guards, although their third visit, on September 18, was reportedly less heavily supervised. Batebi was not permitted to see his lawyer.

Amnesty International reported that Batebi's physical and mental health was deteriorating further.

"He suffers from a number of medical problems due to being tortured and ill-treated during his previous detention, including stomach and kidney problems. He has lost some of his teeth, permanent hearing problems, and poor vision." Despite the seriousness of his medical condition, prison authorities are allegedly not permitting Ahmad Batebi to receive any medical treatment beyond a few painkillers. According to a press report, Dr Hesam Firouzi, Ahmad Batebi's doctor, wrote to the authorities on 6 August stating that his patient was at risk of paralysis or heart attack, and needed to receive specialist treatment outside prison.

Psychological abuse is reported to include denying Batebi "the opportunity to see daylight", forcing him "to wear a blindfold during exercise sessions in the prison yard."

In February 2007, Batebi was reported to have suffered two brain strokes over a few days, having several seizures on February 16, spending "three hours in a coma" and suffering another two days later after being released from the hospital. He was returned to the prison following his second stroke over the reported objections of hospital doctors who are said to have told prison officials that he requires follow-up care in a hospital. Following the strokes, Batebi reportedly told his father in a telephone call on February 22 that the prison authorities do not care about him and that if he dies, his father should "hold a celebration of my life, rather than a funeral".

Somaye Bayanat, Batebi's wife, was detained at her house outside Tehran on February 21, 2007. "Her whereabouts are not known to Amnesty International. Amnesty International fears she may risk intimidation, harassment or ill-treatment because of her connection to Ahmad Batebi."

== Escape ==
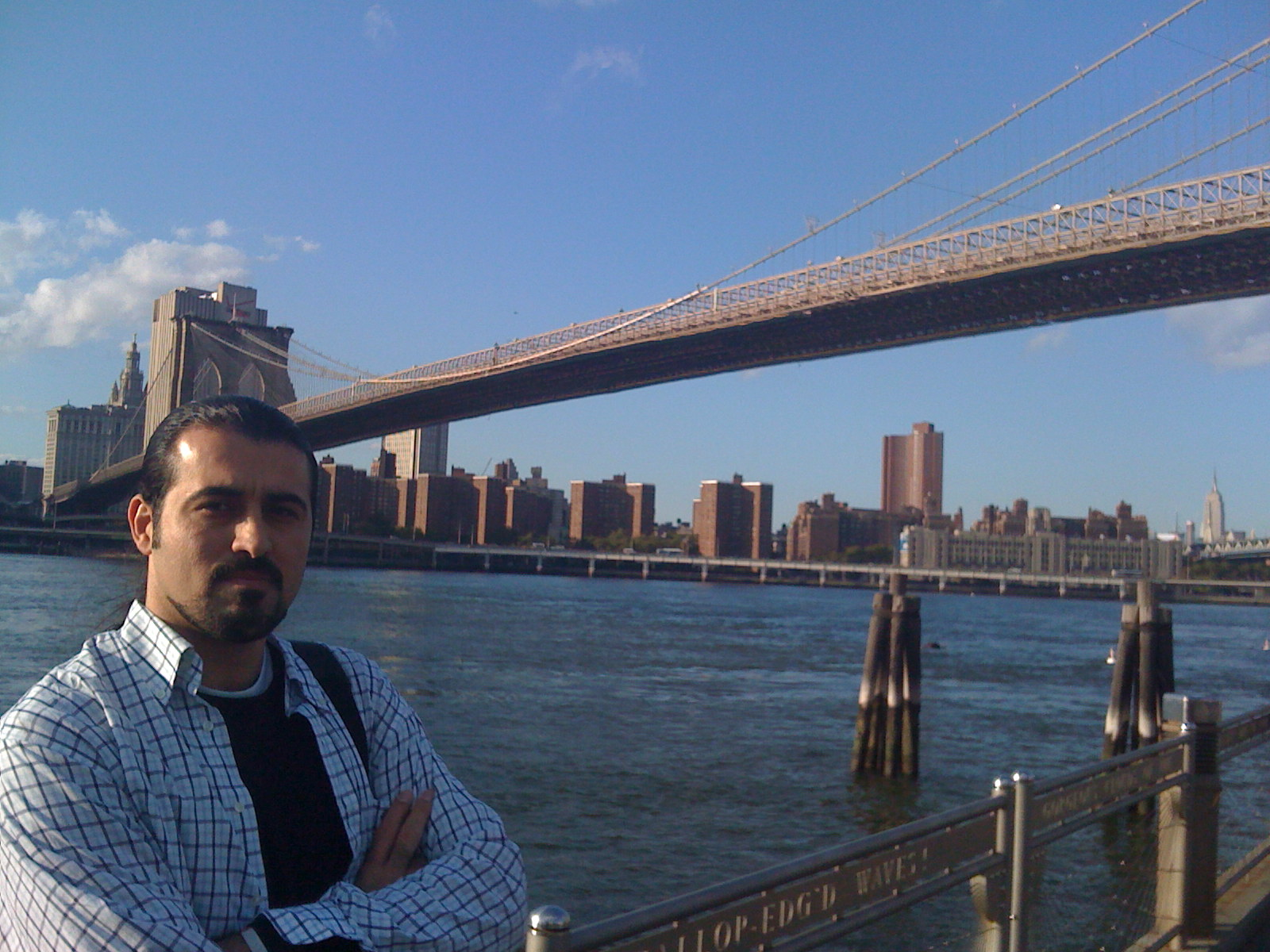
Ahmad Batebi, New York, Summer 2008

While being temporarily released from Evin Prison to receive medical attention, Batebi fled the country into Iraq. Batebi's escape from Iran and eventual transfer to the United States began when he contacted internationally recognized immigration and human rights, lawyer and activist Lily Mazahery, on March 13, 2008, on the then-existing Yahoo 360 social media site. He was further assisted by the KDPI and the Kurdish underground network who moved him to the northwestern border with Iraq and then to Arbil.

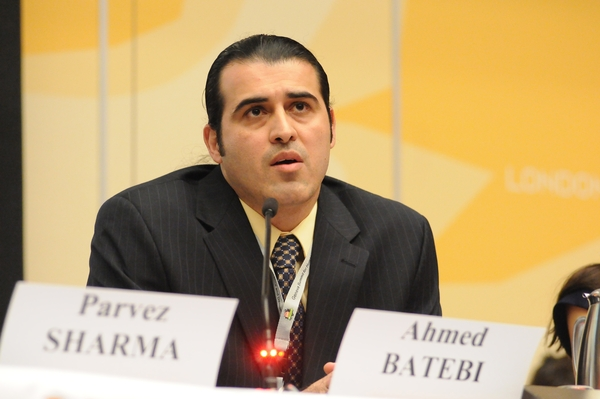
Batebi in Geneva Switzerland, United Nations Headquarters, 2009

Mazahery reported his critical situation in Arbil to the United States government, which accepted his entrance to the US under "humanitarian parole". Although Sweden had granted him asylum through UNHCR, after consulting his friends and lawyer in the US, Batebi preferred to reside there. On June 23, 2008, Batebi left Iraq for the United States. After a short airport transit through Austria, he arrived in Washington Dulles International Airport on June 24, 2008, where officials escorted him from the National Security Council from his plane to the international section of the airport, where White House officials transferred his custody to Mazahery.

== Aftermath ==
Following his escape to the U.S., Batebi appeared in an interview with Voice of America (VOA) Persian TV in which he explained the story of his escape. He announced that he intended to represent Iran's human rights activists in the U.S. Some also criticized him for his frequent presence on VOA programs. Batebi was eventually hired by Voice of America Persian TV.

== See also ==
- Human rights in Iran
- Iranian reform movement

== References and notes ==
Specific references:

General references:

- Amnesty International Urgent Action to get Batebi Medical Treatment, Wife Detained Archived 2007-09-29 at the Wayback Machine
- Amnesty International: Iran: Further information on fear for safety/ medical concern/ incommunicado detention: Ahmad Batebi (m)
- Amnesty International: "Five Years of injustice and ill treatment: Akbar Mohammadi - case sheet", July 7, 2004. Accessed May 4, 2007.
- Ahmad Batebi Profile The Alliance for Essential Liberties in the Middle East's profile of Ahmad Batebi Dead link
