= Salam (newspaper) =

Daily newspaper in Iran(1991–1999)

- Publisher: Mohammad Mousavi Khoeiniha
- President: Mohammad Mousavi Khoeiniha
- Editor-in-chief: Ibrahim Abedi; Abbas Abdi
- Founded: 9 February 1991
- Ceased publication: 1999
- Political alignment: Reformism (Iranian)
- Language: Persian
- Headquarters: Tehran
- Country: Iran

Salam (Persian: سلام, romanized: Salām; IPA: [sæ.lɒ́ːm]; lit. 'Salute') was a Persian-language daily newspaper published in Tehran, Iran. It was named by Ahmad Khomeini, the son of Ayatollah Khomeini. It was highly influential in the country during its brief existence from 1991 to 1999 and was one of the early reformist dailies published following the Islamic revolution in Iran.

== History and profile ==
Salam was established by a group of reformist people attached to the Association of Combatant Clerics, and the first issue appeared on 9 February 1991. The paper was based in Tehran and became one of the most read dailies in the country soon after its launch.

The publisher of Salam was Mohammad Mousavi Khoeiniha who remained in the post until 1999 when it was disestablished.

== Content, political stance and editors ==
In addition to quality editorials, Salam provided investigative articles about financial scandals. It was among the first newspapers in the country to deal with injustice and corruption. The paper also included a special section in which readers wrote their comments or raised questions.

Salam had an anti-American and social democrat political stance. It had also a liberal stance and advocated state planning in economy. It criticized Ali Akbar Rafsanjani while he was serving as the President and supported the next President Mohammad Khatami during his election campaign.

One of the editors-in-chief of Salam was Ibrahim Abedi. Abbas Abdi also served in the post.

== Bans and closure ==
Abbas Abdi, editor-in-chief of Salam, was jailed for eight months in 1993 for his critical writings published in the paper. On 7 July 1999 Salam was temporarily banned by the Special Court for the Clergy following its publication of a secret ministry report. This incident led to six-day student demonstrations in Tehran. It was the first major student uprising since the Islamic revolution in 1979.

On 4 August 1999 the paper was banned for five years and its publisher, Mohammad Mousavi Khoeiniha, was banned from journalistic activity for three years.
