= Detainees of the Mahsa Amini protests =

People arrested in 2022 Iranian protests

This list reports the notable citizens, civil and political activists, students, journalists, lawyers and athletes who have been arrested in Iran during the ongoing protests sparked by the death of Mahsa Amini in September 2022. There is no clear information about the whereabouts and the situation of many of them.

The arrests come on top of severe internet restrictions and blocking of apps including Instagram and WhatsApp, which activists say is aimed at preventing details of the protests from reaching the outside world.

This list is organized in alphabetic order of the surnames.

== Detainees ==
List of detainees
	Detainee	Date of arrest	Date of release	Location	Circumstances
1	Elham Afkari	10 November		Shiraz	Elham Afkari, Navid Afkari's sister, was arrested on 10 November 2022 and charged with being an agent of Iran International, the opposition television broadcaster which was recently called a "terrorist" organization by the Iranian intelligence minister. She is in the custody of Iran's Ministry of Intelligence.
2	Taraneh Alidoosti	17 December	4 January 2023	Evin Prison	Leading Iranian actor. Earlier in November she had posted a picture of herself on Instagram without the mandatory hijab to show support for Woman, Life, Freedom and the Mahsa Amini protests. She was arrested on 17 December after security forces searched her house. She was later released on 4 January 2023, after posting bail which was reported to be around £20,000.
2	Mona Borzouei	28 September		Evin Prison	Poet and songwriter. Security forces arrested Borzouee on 28 September 2022, during Mahsa Amini protests, for statements she had made on her Twitter account.
3	Golrokh Ebrahimi Iraee	26 September		Tehran	Human rights activist, former political prisoner and wife of Arash Sadeghi. She was arrested by security forces in her house and taken to an undisclosed location.
4	Hengameh Ghaziani	20 November		—	Actress. She was arrested for "provocative" social media posts and media activity. She had expressed solidarity with the protest movement and removed her headscarf in public.
5	Shervin Hajipour	29 September		Sari	Singer and songwriter. He was arrested on 29 September for his song Baraye which has been described as "the anthem" of the protests and later released on bail.
6	Niloofar Hamedi	21 September		Evin Prison	Journalist who broke the news of Mahsa Amini's treatment by the morality police.
7	Faezeh Hashemi Rafsanjani	Late September		—	Women's rights activist and politician. She was arrested in late September 2022.
8	Bahareh Hedayat	3 October		Evin Prison	Women's rights activist. She was arrested by security forces in Tehran on 11 October. After eight days of detention she informed her family in a phone call that she was in the ward 209 of Evin prison and did not know the reason for her arrest, nor the charges against her.
9	Hossein Mahini	29 September		Tehran	Footballer and a member of the Iran national football team in 2006. He was arrested for voicing solidarity and support with the Iranian people during the protests on social media.
10	Amir Emad Mirmirani	5 October		Evin Prison	Blogger, lecturer and internet activist known as Jadi. Security forces raided his house and arrested him without showing an arrest warrant.
11	Elaheh Mohammadi	29 September		Tehran	Journalist who reported on Mahsa Amini's funeral. According to her lawyer, Mohammad Ali Kamfiroozi, Mohammadi was summoned by the judicial authorities but was then arrested by security forces on 29 September 2022 while on her way to the Ministry of Intelligence office for questioning.
12	Katayoun Riahi	29 November		Qazvin province	Actress. She was one of the first celebrities who took off her hijab amidst the nationwide protests and in support of the people. Security forces arrested her in her villa in the suburbs of Qazvin. Her arrest took place about two months after the security officers' attempt to arrest her in her house, but according to reports she had managed to escape in time.
13	Kaveh Rezaei	29 September		Tehran	Football player from Shabad and a member of the Tractor team. He was detained by the security forces in Tehran and transferred to Evin Prison.
14	Hossein Ronaghi	24 September		Evin Prison	Blogger, human rights activist and political dissident. He was arrested along with his lawyers by security agents in front of the Evin Prosecutor's Office and transferred to Evin prison where he was tortured and both of his legs broken. He has been on hunger strike since his arrest and in spite of life-threatening deterioration of his health, prison officials refuse to dispatch him to the hospital for medical care. In a statement from Evin Prison, imprisoned filmmakers Jafar Panahi and Mohammad Rasoulof warned about the serious deterioration of Ronaghi's health and said that he is in danger of having a stroke any minute after fifty days of hunger strike.
15	Arash Sadeghi	12 October		Evin Prison	Iranian activist and former political prisoner. He was arrested on 12 October and taken to Evin Prison. According to his father Arash is suffering from chondrosarcoma and the prison is denying him his special medication and not allowing the family to deliver them to the prison either. Due to his illness he has to take a special blood test and have his bone tissues scanned every month, so the continuation of detention is very harmful for aggravating his illness.
16	Toomaj Salehi	30 October		—	Iranian hip hop artist mostly known for his protest songs. Fars News Agency, affiliated with the IRGC, described him as one of "the leaders of the riots who promoted violence."
17	Fatemeh Sepehri	21 September		Mashhad	Civil rights activist and former political prisoner. She was arrested and taken to the solitary confinement at the Islamic Revolutionary Guard Corps Intelligence center after security agents raided her house. She was previously sentenced to prison due to her peaceful activities.
18	Majid Tavakoli	23 September		Tehran	Human rights activist and political prisoner. His brother Mohsen Tavakoli announced his arrest on Twitter and reported that the security forces came into the house at night by creating panic and took his brother away.
19	Mahmood Shahriari	28 September		Tehran	Radio and Television presenter.
20	Dariush Farhood	—		Tehran	85-year-old professor of medical and clinical genetics is known as the father of Iran's genetics.
21	Hamidreza Aliasgari	—		Tehran	Footballer and a member of the Iran national football team from 2006 to 2011. He was arrested for supporting the Iranian people during the protests on social media.
22	Mohammadreza Jalaeipour	—		Evin Prison	Sociologist and political activist.
23	Milad Nouri	4 October		Tehran	Developer, digital rights and Internet freedom activist.
24	Adel Talebi	September		Fashafooyeh Prison	Digital marketer and digital activist who has been arrested by security forces in Tehran.
25	Aryan Eqbal	4 October		Tehran	Network engineer and Internet freedom activist arrested in Tehran.
26	Mohsen Tahmasebi			Shiraz	Cyber Security activist.
27	Neda Naji	2 October		—	Labor activist Neda Naji was arrested.
28	Pouran Nazemi	19 October		—	Iranian Human rights activist.
29	Nik Yousefi	16 October		Tehran	Security forces arrested photographer and filmmaker Nik Yousefi and transferred him to an unidentified location.
30	Marzieh Amiri	—		Tehran	Iranian journalist
31	Yalda Moaiery	19 September		Tehran	Iranian security forces arrested Moaiery, a prominent photojournalist, as she was covering anti-state protests on Hejab street in downtown Tehran
32	Nazila Maroufian	—		Tehran	Iranian journalist
33	Kianoush Sanjari	13 November		Tehran	Iranian journalist
34	Iman Behpasand	22 September		Tehran	Iranian journalist
35	Ruhollah Nakhaee	23 September		Tehran	Iranian journalist
36	Alireza Khoshbakht	23 September		Tehran	Iranian journalist
37	Zahra Tohidi				Iranian journalist
38	Mojtaba Rahimi				Iranian journalist
39	Majid Tavakoli				Iranian journalist
40	Marzieh Talaee				Iranian journalist
41	Masoud Kordpour	20 September		Bukan	Iranian journalist
42	Hamed Shafiei				Iranian journalist
43	Sarvenaz Ahmadi	6 November	29 December 2024	Tehran	Iranian journalist. After being released on bail in December 2022, in January 2023 she was sentenced to six years imprisonment which was reduced to three years on appeal. Ahmadi began serving her sentence in May 2023. In September 2024, Ahmadi started a medication strike in protest of inhuman prison conditions and authorities declining to grant her medical leave. She was conditionally released from prison in December 2024.
44	Kamiar Fakour				Iranian journalist
45	Elmira Bahmani				Iranian journalist
46	Mehrnoosh Tafian	28 September		Ahvaz	Iranian journalist
47	Farshid Ghorbanpour	25 September		Tehran	Iranian journalist
48	Javad Shaker				Iranian journalist
49	Alireza Jabbari-Darestani	25 September		Tehran	Iranian journalist
50	Siavash Soleimani				Iranian journalist
51	Ali Khatibzadeh				Iranian journalist
52	Fardin Kamangar				Iranian journalist
53	Mohammad Zare-Foumani				Iranian journalist
54	Saba Sherdoost				Iranian journalist
55	Milad Fadaei-Asl				Iranian journalist
56	Mandana Sadeghi	19 October		Abadan	Iranian journalist
57	Reza Mohammadi				Iranian journalist
58	Amir Ebtehaj				Iranian journalist
59	Farzaneh Yahya-Abadi	19 October		Abadan	Iranian journalist
60	Farkhondeh Ashori	17 October		Shiraz	Iranian journalist
61	Navid Jamshidi				Iranian journalist
62	Hossein Esmaeili	12 October		Sabzevar	Photo journalist
63	Marzieh Amiri	31 October			Iranian journalist
64	Ehsan Pirbornash	between 22 and 28 November		Tehran	Iranian journalist
65	Saeedeh Fathi	16 October		Tehran	Iranian journalist
66	Vahid Shamseddin-Nejad				Iranian journalist
67	Yaghma Fashkhami	2 November		Tehran	Iranian journalist
68	Vahid Shademan				Iranian journalist
69	Porya Mahdavi-Moghddam				Iranian journalist
70	Nazila Maroufian	30 October		Tehran	Iranian journalist
71	Saman Ghazali				Iranian journalist
72	Malihe Darki	26 October		Abadan	Iranian journalist
73	Nasrin Hassani	30 September		Bojnourd	Iranian journalist
74	Somayeh Masror				Iranian journalist
75	Omid Tahan-Bidhendi	4 October		Tehran	Iranian journalist
76	Samaneh Asghari	11 October		Qarchak Perison	Student of industrial engineering at Khawarzami University and an activist women and children's rights activist.
77	Leila Mirghaffari	16 September		Tehran	Human Rights Activists
78	Faranak Rafiei	18 September		Sanandaj	Human Rights Activists
79	Ribvar Kamranipour	19 September		Marivan	Human Rights Activists
80	Amjad Saedi	19 September		Marivan	Human Rights Activists
81	Mahrizan Ahmadi	20 September		Sanandaj	Human Rights Activists
82	Baran Saedi	arrested between 17 and 21 September		Sanandaj	Human Rights Activists
83	Mahrou Hedayati	arrested between 17 and 21 September		Sanandaj	Human Rights Activists
84	Azadeh Jama’ati	arrested between 17 and 21 September		Sanandaj	Human Rights Activists
85	Bahar Zangiband	arrested between 17 and 21 September		Sanandaj	Human Rights Activists
86	Siroos Abbasi	22 September		Dehgolan	Human Rights Activists
87	Azad Abbasi	22 September		Dehgolan	Human Rights Activists
88	Fatemeh Sepehri	22 September		Mashhad	Human Rights Activists
89	Majid Tavakoli	23 September		Tehran	Human Rights Activists
90	Bahareh Hedayat	3 October		Tehran	Human Rights Activists
91	Hossein Masoumi	3 October		Tehran	Human Rights Activists
92	Hossein Sarbandi	3 October		Tehran	Human Rights Activists
93	Saeed Shirzad	3 October		Tehran	Human Rights Activists
94	Ali Shirzad	3 October		Tehran	Human Rights Activists
100	Neda Naji	2 October		Tehran	Human Rights Activists
101	Leila Abbasi	21 September		Bijar (city)	Teachers’ Rights Activist
102	Jafar Valadkhan	21 September		Bijar (city)	Teachers’ Rights Activist
103	Ms. Ghelichkhani	21 September		Bijar (city)	Teachers’ Rights Activist
104	Mohammad Reza Nosrati	21 September		Bijar (city)	Teachers’ Rights Activist
105	Melika Kavand	21 September		Bijar (city)	Teachers’ Rights Activist
106	Mozaffar Salehnia	21 September		Sanandaj	Free Workers Union of Iran board member
107	Shadi Aslani	21 September		Sanandaj	Teacher
108	Reza Sharifeh	21 September		Sanandaj	Retired teachers
109	Mohammad Karam Zamani	27 September		Bijar (city)	Teachers’ Rights Activist
110	Davoud Razavi	27 September		Tehran	Bus trade union official
111	Kamran Sakhtemangar	29 September		Saqqez	Labor activist
112	Mohammad Aref Jahangiri	1 October		Sanandaj	Retired teacher
113	Shahram Azmoudeh	2 October		Talesh	Teachers’ Rights Activist / journalist
114	Mohammad Saeid Boueshagh	2 October		Lordegan	Teachers’ Rights Activist
115	Hesam Mehdizadeh	29 September		Kamyaran	Teachers’ Rights Activist
116	Edris Mehdizadeh	29 September		Kamyaran	Teachers’ Rights Activist
117	Farzin Movafaghi	29 September		Kamyaran	Teachers’ Rights Activist
118	Khabas Mozaffari	29 September		Kamyaran	Teachers’ Rights Activist
119	Bahram Yaghobi	3 October		Tabriz	Teachers’ Rights Activist
120	Mansoureh Mousavi	20 September		Mashhad	Author/Women's Rights Activist
121	Karamollah Soleimani	21 September		Gachsaran County	Author/Theater director
122	Mojgan Kavousi	23 September		Nowshahr	Former prisoner of conscience/research
123	Banafsheh Kamali	24 September		Yazd, central Iran	Poet
124	Morvarid Ayaz	30 September		Rasht	Sociologist
125	Zahra Savarian	3 October		Abadan, Iran	Poet
126	Atefeh Chaharmahalian	3 October		(city unknown)	Poet, former board member of the Iranian Writers Association
127	Golshin Mohammadian	between 17 and 21 September		Sanandaj	Filmmaker/Rights activist
128	Farhad Sanandaji	21 September		Sanandaj	Filmmaker/Rights activist
129	Mahnaz Mohammadi	19 September		Tehran	Filmmaker/Women Rights activist
130	Amir Gholami	21 September		Tabriz	Filmmaker/Rights activist
131	Mohammad Siamaknia	24 September		Tabriz	Documentary Filmmaker/Rights activist
132	Sara Saniei	25 September		Tehran	Sculptor
133	Peyman Mirzazadeh	26 September		Tehran	Singer/former prisoner of conscience
134	Sepideh Salarvand	2 October		Tehran	Filmmaker/Rights activist
135	Toktam Akhundzadeh	30 September		Tehran	Female former national row team member
136	Farideh Moradkhani	23 November		Tehran	Niece of Iran's Supreme Leader, Ayatollah Ali Khamenei and daughter of the late Ali Tehrani, a Shia Islamic theologian, writer, and opposition figure.
137	Voria Ghafouri	24 November		Tehran	Professional soccer player
138	Reza Asadabadi	23 November			Labor Journalist
139	Adel Karimi	11 October		Mahabad	Photo Journalist
140	Vida Rabbani	24 September		Tehran	Journalist
141	Aria Jafari	25 September		Isfahan	Photo Journalist
142	Fahimeh Nazari	3 November		Tehran	Journalist
143	Mehdi Amirpour	27 November		Tehran	Sports Journalist
144	Hashem Moazenzadeh	21 September		Tehran	Media Activist
145	Maryam Vahidian	27 November			Labor Journalist, arrested on her birthday
146	Mohammad Ali Kamfirouzi	15 December	9 January 2023	Shiraz	Advocate and civil rights activist
147	Mehdi Bahman	11 October		Tehran	Storyteller, illustrator and researcher in the field of approximation of religions. Arrested following a public interview with Israeli Public Broadcasting Corporation and was sentenced to death by the Islamic Revolutionary Court.
148	Elnaz Mohammadi	5 February 2023	11 February 2023	Tehran	Iranian journalist and former social group secretary of The Ham-Mihan newspaper. She and her twin sister Elaheh Mohammadi were arrested by Islamic Revolutionary Guard Corps during Mahsa Amini protests.
149	Donya Rad	30 September		Tehran	Iranian social media activist and script supervisor who was arrested by the Islamic Revolutionary Guard Corps during the Mahsa Amini protests for published a photo of herself and another girl without a hijab eating breakfast in a coffee shop in the south of Tehran.
150	Negin Bagheri	September 2023		Tehran	Bagheri and Elnaz Mohammadi were arrested by Islamic Revolutionary Guard Corps during the Mahsa Amini protests for "assembly and collusion" and "conspiracy".
151	Hamid Pourazari	22 November		Tehran	theatre director, actor and playwright who was arrested by Islamic Revolutionary Guard Corps during the Mahsa Amini protests for publishing a video appeared on Soheila Golestani's Instagram page. In it, she, along with several actors including theater director Pourazari and others, appeared without hijabs.
152	Eshragh Najafabadi	October 2022	6 February 2023	Shiraz	athlete and a former member of Iran's national Mountain Bike team. He was arrested during the Mahsa Amini protests in Iran. He was accused of participation in the 2022 Shah Cheragh attack. He was released after three months of detention.
153	Elham Modarresi	2 November	January 2023	Karaj	Iranian painter and political prisoner. She was arrested on 2 November 2022 by the Islamic Republic of Iran's security agents raiding her house and was transferred to Kechoui prison in Karaj. Modarresi claimed she was subjected to torture to obtain a forced confession and was denied medical treatment for a genetic liver disorder. Modarresi was released in January 2023.
154	Mahan Sadrat	Between 12 October and 3 November		Tehran	He was accused of Muharebeh and sentenced to death. His death sentence was overturned by the lower court on 24 December 2023.
155	Soheila Golestani	22 November	11 December	Tehran	Iranian actress and voice actor. In the Mahsa Amini protests a video of Golestani was published in which she appeared with several other actors without a hijab in front of the camera. This protest movement was later repeated with the same form and style by other groups of Iranian and foreign artists. Following the release of this video and its widespread coverage, Golestani and Hamid Pourazari were arrested on 22 November 2022.
156	Behrad Ali Konari	November 3, 2022	April 17, 2023	Karaj	Behrad Ali Konari, a rapper from Ahvaz, is one of the sixteen defendants in the case of the death of Rouhollah Ajamian. Following the commemoration of Hadis Najafi in Karaj, he was sentenced to 25 years of imprisonment in exile by the initial court.
156	Vafa Ahmadpour	May 9, 2024	February 19, 2024	Shiraz	On Thursday, May 9, 2024, Vafa Ahmadpour and Danial Moghaddam were arrested in Shiraz following the release of the music video for "Amadebash," which addresses the repression of the 2021 uprising and criticizes the Islamic Republic, as well as the demographic challenges and issues facing the people of Iran. The video for "Amadebash" was filmed at Persepolis (Takht-e Jamshid). In the song, they address problems such as economic difficulties and the "morality police" (Gasht-e Ershad), stating that "the people of Iran" will remain united and "take over this country."

== See also ==
- Human rights in Iran
