= Hossein Ronaghi =

Iranian human rights activist (born 1985)

- حسین رونقی
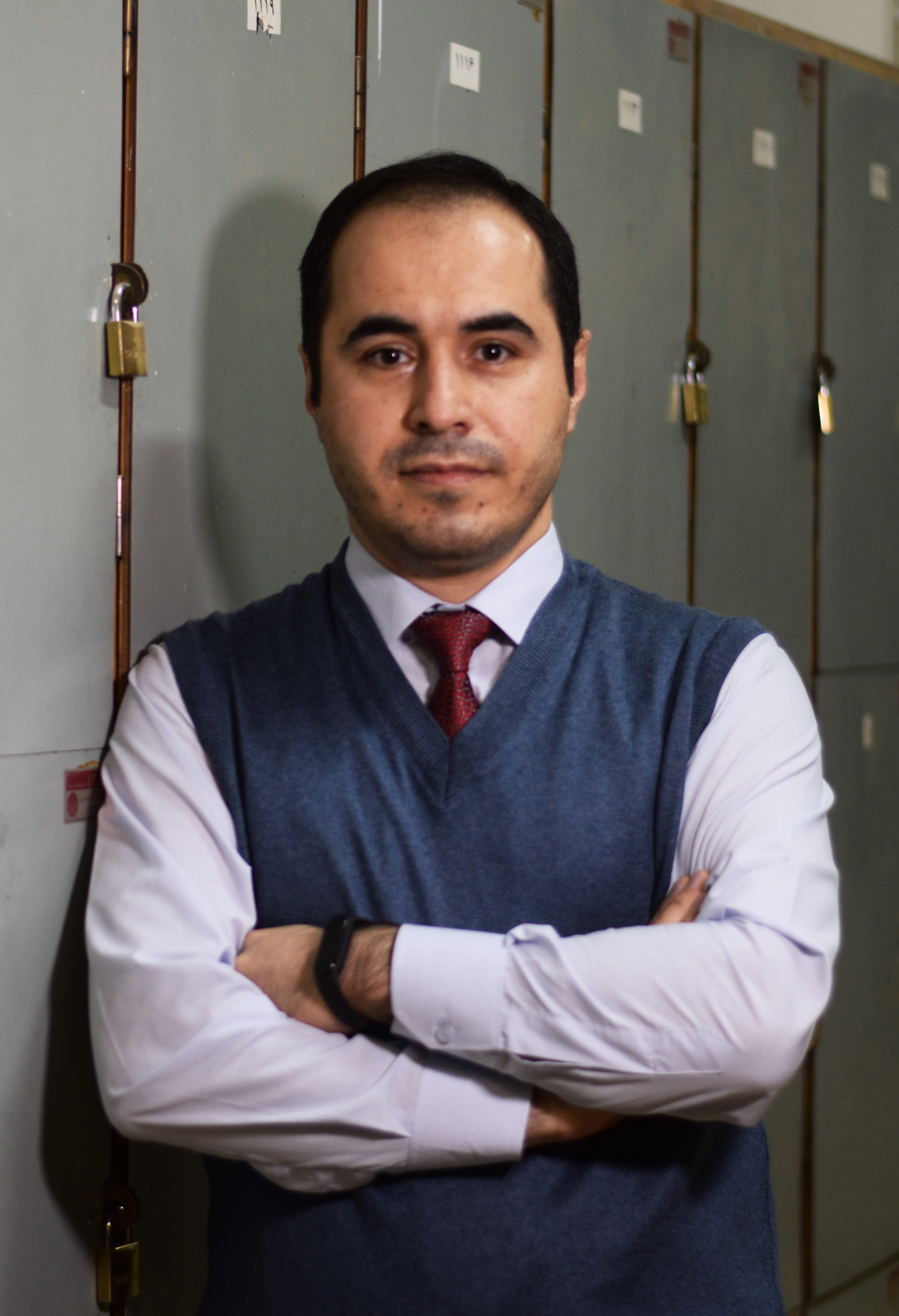
- Ronaghi in January 2022
- Born: Seyed Hossein Ronaghi Maleki سید حسین رونقی مَلِکی; 4 July 1985 (age 41); Malekan, East Azerbaijan province, Iran
- Education: Software engineering
- Alma mater: Azad University
- Occupations: Human rights activist; blogger; journalist
- Years active: 2008–present
- Known for: Supervisor of Iran Proxy

Seyed Hossein Ronaghi Maleki (Persian: سید حسین رونقی ملکی; born July 4, 1985) is an Iranian human rights activist and blogger. He spent a total of 6 years in prison since 2009 for his activities. Following his re-arrest in 2022, he became one of the well-known faces of the Mahsa Amini protests.

== Early life ==
Hossein Ronaghi was born on 4 July 1985 in Malekan, East Azerbaijan. He was a computer software engineering student at Arak Azad University.

== Biography ==
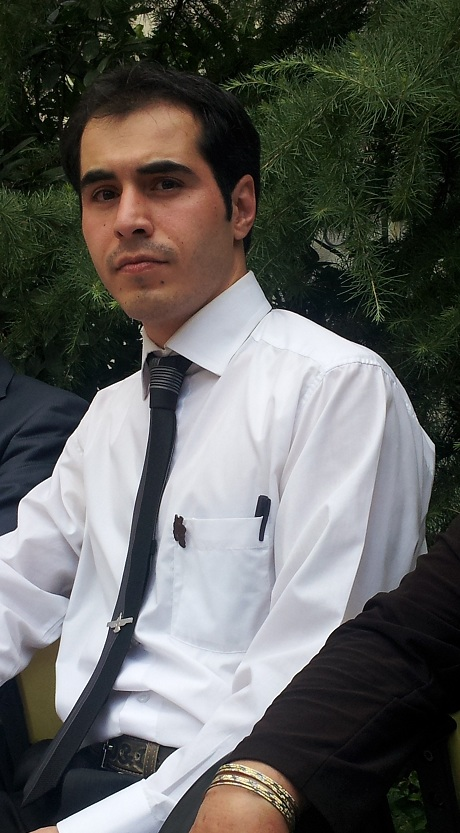
Ronaghi in his 20s

He was first imprisoned on 13 December 2009, for his activities in the 2009 Iranian presidential election protests. Before the 2009 presidential election of Iran, Ronaghi was blogging under the pseudonym of Babak Khorramdin. He was in charge of the anti-censorship committee Iran Proxy. The committee would create a list of websites to pass filtering and send it to people via email. Ronaghi was re-arrested on 23 February 2022 after criticising the Cyberspace service regulation system that would limit internet access in Iran.

== Arrests ==
=== 13 December 2009 ===
Ronaghi was quietly arrested along with his brother Hassan on 13 December 2009, for renewing proxies that allowed journalists and political activists to circumvent the government's website bans following last year's contested presidential elections. He was also charged with insulting the leadership for his critical blog posts.

Ronaghi and his brother were subjected to severe physical and mental pressure in the prison to the extent that, according to his family, Hassan was injured in the back of his neck due to torture. His brother was released from prison a month later with a bail of 80 million tomans.

On 15 March 2010, Kayhan whose editor-in-chief is representative of the Supreme Leader of Iran, published a report about Ronaghi and made heavy accusations against this articles. In the report, he was accused of taking action against national security and communicating with foreign organizations and taking money from them.

The continued pressure on him in the solitary cells to get a televised confession made Ronagi go on a hunger strike on 24 May 2010, and was transferred to solitary cell. After his hunger strike, his parents went to Tehran to follow up on his condition but did not get any news about their child and the judicial authorities did not answer them. After hearing a negative answer for a face-to-face meeting from the Tehran prosecutor, Hossein Ronaghi's mother decided to go on a hunger strike together with her son until he broke his hunger strike after nearly two weeks.

After 10 months of Hossein Ronaghi Maleki's detention in Ward 2A of Evin Prison, finally on 5 October 2010, the 26th branch of the Revolutionary Court issued a sentence of 15 years of imprisonment and was served on him, and due to his refusal to sign the sentence, he was beaten by the head of the office and accompanying officers; For this reason, he went on a hunger strike on 7 October 2010, for the third time during his prison term, in protest against his sentence, which resulted in his serious physical condition. On 20 November 2010, Ronaghi's case, that faced objections from his lawyers, was sent to the Court of Appeals, and on 11 December 2010, the sentence of 15 years of ta'zir imprisonment (it is the kind of imprisonment where the convict cannot pay a fine instead of serving his full prison sentence) for Hossein Ronaghi was approved by the 54th branch of the Court of Appeals, and he was sent to Section 350 of Evin Prison. His accusations in the court were "membership in the proxy Iran network with the aim of disrupting the country's security, insulting the leadership, insulting the founder of the Islamic Republic, publishing lies with the intention of disturbing the public mind and propagandizing activities against the system of the Islamic Republic of Iran."

In prison, Ronaghi developed a kidney disease and underwent at least four operations. More than 100 of Maleki's fellow prisoners wrote a letter to the authorities warning that he would die if not provided with appropriate medical care.

Although Ronaghi suffers from heart and kidney problems, during his custody, the prison guards denied him medical treatment. When he went on a hunger strike to protest his maltreatment and torture, he was placed in solitary confinement. He was under intense pressure to make a televised confession of his alleged wrongdoing. when Ronaghi was handed a 15-years long prison sentence. Neither his lawyer nor his family were present for the verdict.

He requested sick leave twice in letters to the prosecutor of Tehran on 10 July 2011, and in August of the same year, and in those letters he spoke about his bad condition and the prison condition and the pressures of the illegal institutions in the prison. This letter caused him to be beaten in prison on 15 August 2011. As a result of this beating, he was transferred to Taleghani Hospital in Tehran and was under anesthesia for several hours. On the same night, while he was not in a good condition, Ronaghi was sent back to Evin prison and was denied leave. Ronaghi lost a kidney on 26 October 2011, due to not being transferred to the hospital on time and not being on sick leave. He went on an indefinite hunger strike following the intervention of Intelligence Organization of the Islamic Revolutionary Guard Corps in his case and preventing him from receiving sick leave in December 2011. Having been recently operated on, he was specifically kicked in the kidney by security forces. Physical abuse and torture, lack of medical treatment, and the effects of several hunger strikes led to Ronaghi's kidney failure. Consequently, his kidney was removed, and his remaining kidney was extremely damaged, threatening his life while in prison.

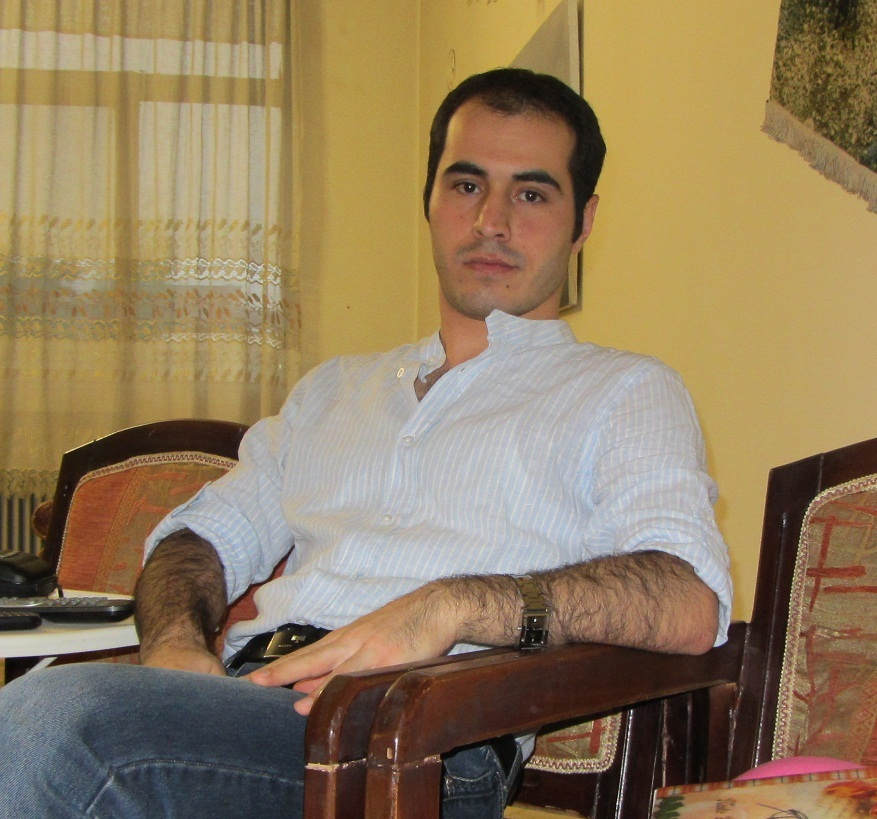
Ronaghi in July 2012

In July 2012, he was given a short medical parole but after some time, he was beaten and arrested again while helping the victims of the 2012 East Azerbaijan earthquakes. Having been recently operated on, he was specifically kicked in the kidney by security forces. He then was sent on medical leave in the early summer of 2015 with a bail of one billion and four hundred million tomans. In the winter of the same year, during treatment, he was sent back to prison again to serve the rest of his sentence.

Amnesty International designated Ronaghi a prisoner of conscience, stating that he appeared to be "held solely on account of his peaceful exercise of his right to freedom of expression". The organization called for him to be released immediately and unconditionally.

In January 2016, Ronaghi was reported to be back in Evin prison after a period of medical parole that had been granted in June 2015.

In April 2016, Ronaghi was released from Evin prison due to the medical diagnosis of "intolerance of punishment". After his release, he wrote on his Facebook page: "After forty-one days of hunger strike and the hardships my parents suffered and the psychological pressure on the family and the people around me, this was accomplished"

Throughout a ten-year period, Ronaghi spent a total of 6 years in prison, him and his family were under constant pressure, suffered harassment and forced inspections. Finally, in June 2019, his permanent release was signed and Ronaghi's legal case was closed. Though his brother was released, scarred by beatings, Hossein Ronaghi's permanent release was not announced until June 2019.

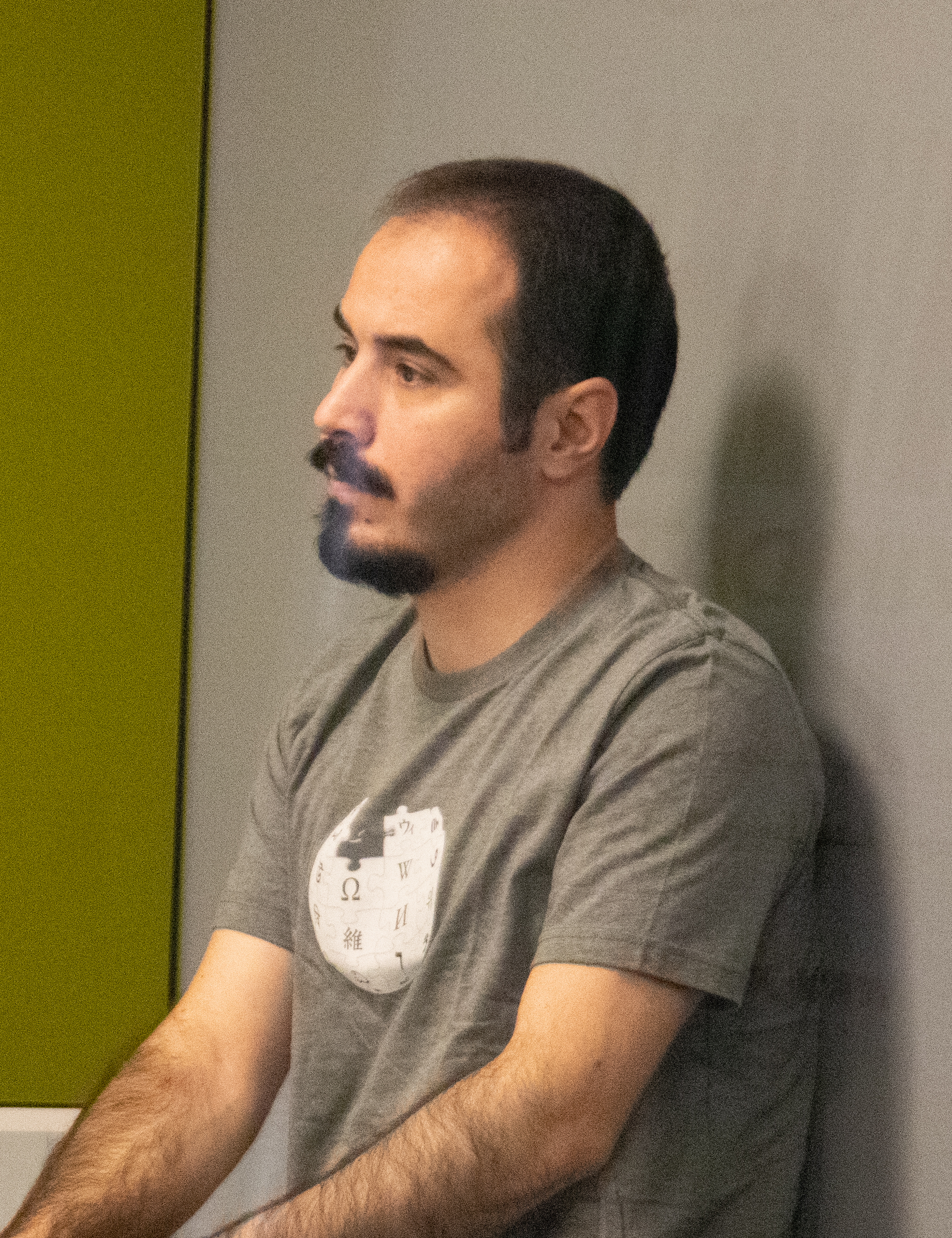
Ronaghi at the 16th Persian Wikipedia Birthday in 2019

Since his release, Ronaghi has been actively advocating against governmental propaganda. Most recently, he published an opinion piece in The Wall Street Journal titled "Western Media Aren't Telling you the Truth About Iran" in which he shared his own experiences and observations as an activist and citizen in the Islamic Republic of Iran.

=== 23 February 2022 ===
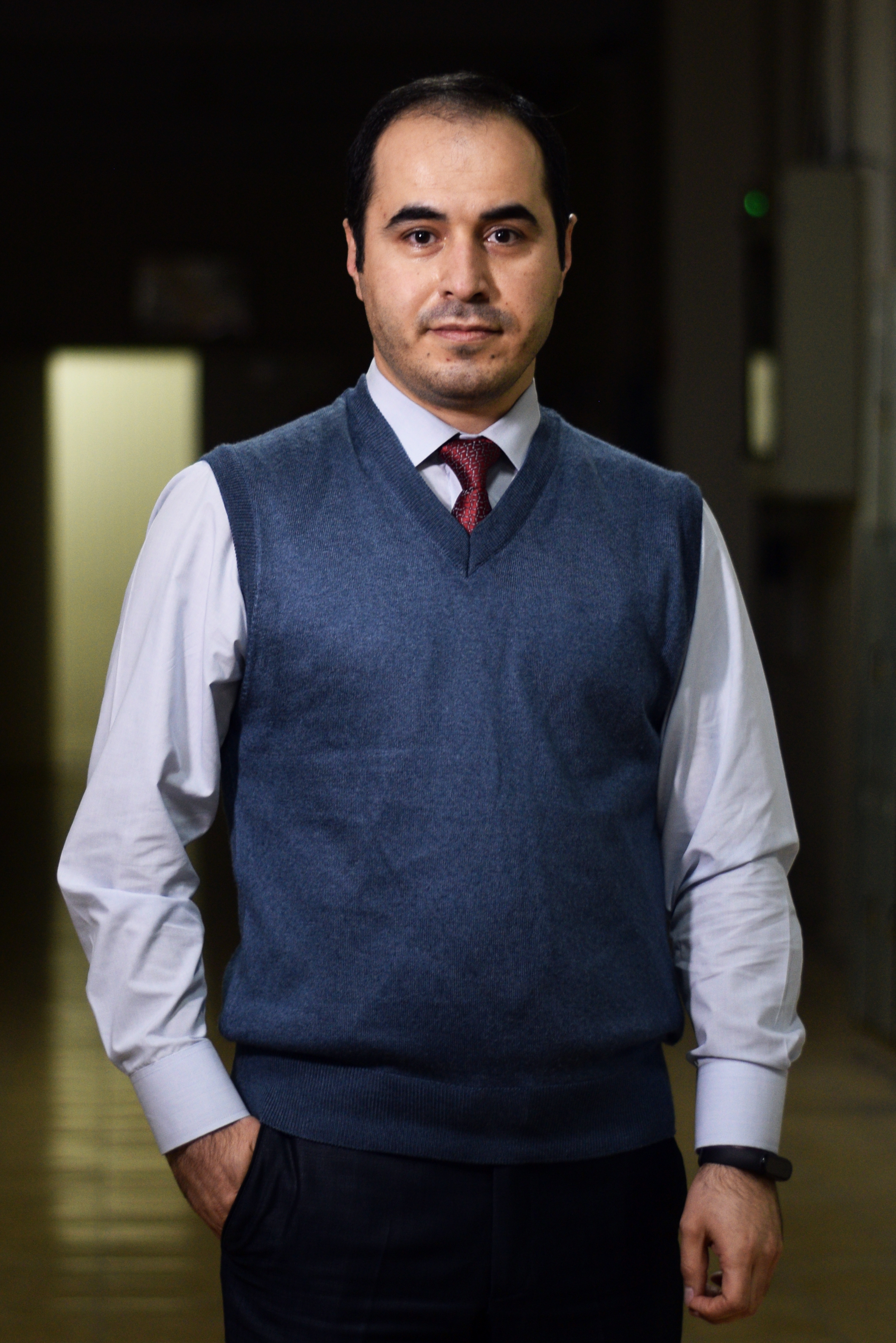
Ronaghi in January 2022

The first news of Ronaghi's re-arrest came up on 23 February 2022, when the media first reported the disappearance of Ronaghi and then his arrest by security forces. The day before his arrest, he had criticized a plan to restrict the Internet in Iran, known as the Cyberspace service regulation system, in a series of tweets. His brother, Hassan Ronaghi, reported anonymous and threatening calls from state security agencies before Hossein disappeared. Confirming the news of his arrest, Iran International News Agency stated that no information was available about the detainee and his whereabouts. Human rights activists say the security forces have raided Ronaghi's home and confiscated some of his belongings.

On 26 February 2022, three days after his abduction, his lawyers appeared at the Security Prosecutor's Office and announced the arrest and filing of a case for their client in the 2nd branch of the investigation headed by investigator Mahmoud Hajmoradi. One of Ronaghi's lawyers said: "Hossein's lawyers were not allowed to access the case and get more information because they were not on the list of trusted lawyers of the judiciary." In a conversation with Harana news agency, some sources identified the organization responsible for the arrest of Hossein Ronaghi as the Ministry of Intelligence. On 27 February 2022, Ronaghi finally called his family, informing them that he had gone on dry hunger strike immediately after arrest. His brother, Hassan Ronaghi, wrote on Twitter: "Hossein called home and I talked to him. Since the day of his abduction, he has been on dry strike and was not feeling very well. I told him to break your strike, it's dangerous for you, he just kept silent in response."

On 3 March 2022, Ronaghi was temporarily released on bail while the charges of "propaganda against the regime" and "congegrating and colluding against national security" remain in place for further proceedings.

=== 24 September 2022 ===
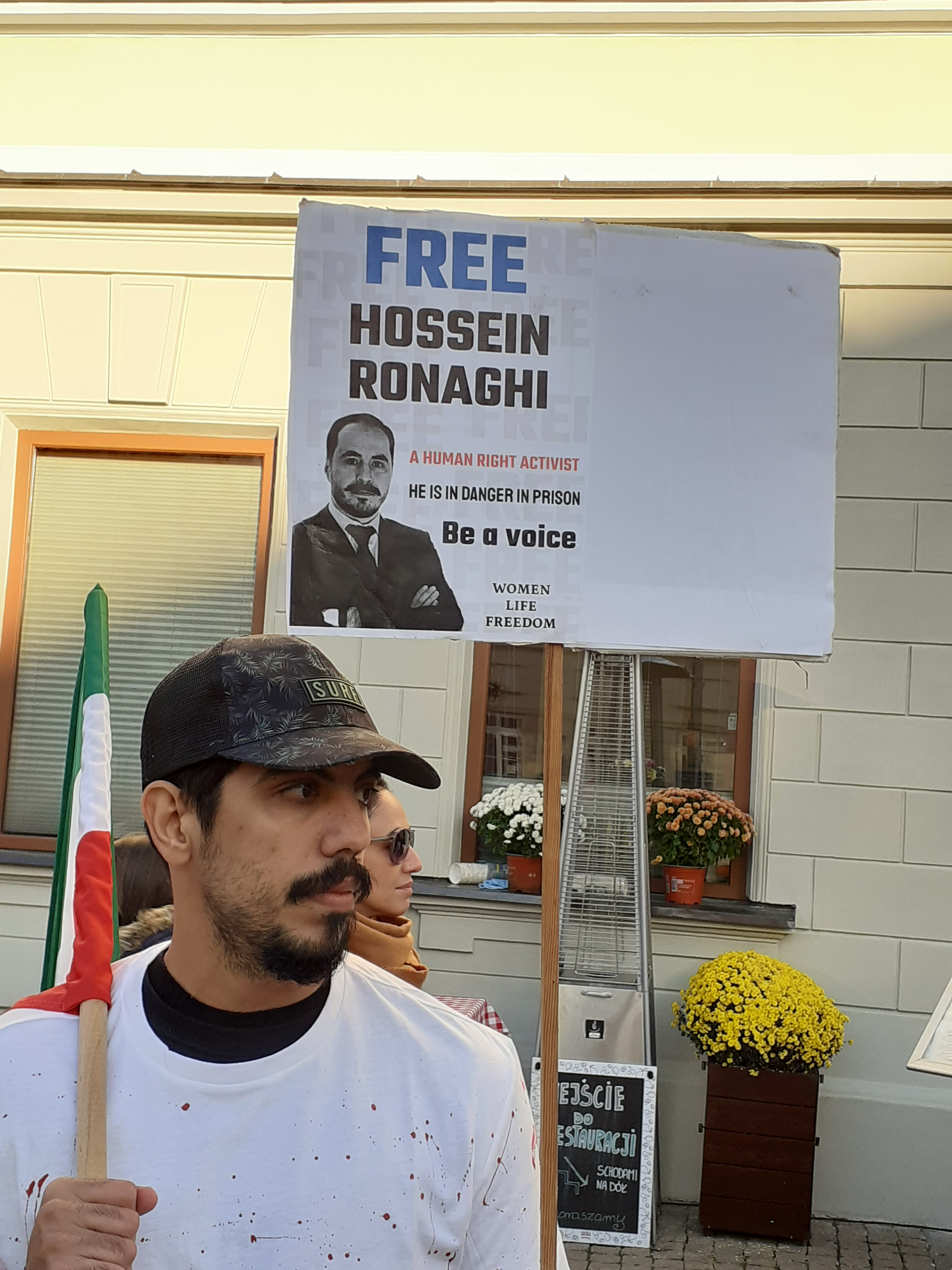
Ronaghi's image during a demonstration of solidarity with Iranian women in Warsaw in November 2022

On 22 September, in the midst of Mahsa Amini protests, Hossein Ronaghi appeared on London-based channel Iran International for the first time, to speak on the uprisings taking place across Iran. In the middle of the interview, Ronaghi noticed the entrance of security forces into his apartment, stating "they seem to be here". While the TV host announced that Ronaghi has reportedly been arrested when closing the program, hours later, he published a video via a friend, informing the public that he had managed to escape a kidnapping attempt by security forces who had brought an ambulance to take him with, and used a brass knuckle to break his car's window. He also promised to go to the Evin Courthouse in the following week with his lawyer, and that he would immediately start a dry strike, if arrested.

On 24 September, Ronaghi appeared at the doors of the Evin Courthouse with his lawyers, Milad Panahipour and Saeid Jalilian, as promised. They were met with a very brutal violence before entering the courthouse. Security forces arrested Ronaghi and both his lawyers upon their entrance into the courthouse. A few days after his brutal arrest, a video was published of the moment he was arrested in front of Evin Courthouse where while he was shouting "I want to go to the prosecutor's office", some people tried to force him into a car. The video of his arrest went viral on social media and his last shout-in-pain words became a symbol of anger of the Mahsa Amini protests against police brutality. Ronaghi started his dry strike from the beginning of entering the prison, and during this time, his family repeatedly expressed concern about his physical weakness.

Ronaghi's parents, Zoleykha Mousavi and Ahmad Ronaghi, said in an exclusive interview with the Voice of America that judicial officers broke both of their son's legs and told the Tabriz intelligence office that if the parents gave an interview, they would destroy the entire family. His parents added that two days after the arrest, on 26 September Hossein confirmed in a call that his both legs were broken. Also, Ahmad Ronaghi emphasized that he heard Hossein Ronaghi's voice when he told his mother, "They broke my legs". Later on, it was reported that both of Ronaghi's legs had been broken, and one of his fingers dislocated without any medical help, and his body had beem dragged inside the prison from his solitary confinement station to the interrogation room.

Mizan News Agency which is the official news agency of Judicial system of the Islamic Republic of Iran said that with the follow-ups, the claims of breaking the legs of Ronaghi are not true at all and denied the violence despite the video of him getting brutally arrested by the security forces.

On 15 October 2022, starting around 10:00 PM Evin Prison caught fire and there were also explosions and automatic gun battles happening. There were no news or phone calls from Ronaghi since his early days of arrest when he had told his family that he started his dry strike. After about twenty days of having no news of him after the prison fire, he called and said that he was still being on a dry strike.

After 15 days of hunger strike, and 4 days of dry strike, one of Ronaghi's lawyers, Milad Panahipour was released from prison.

On 2 November, after 40 days of solitary confinement, Ronaghi was moved from Ward 209 to Ward 4 which is a part of Evin's general section. On 3 November he was transferred to Taleghani hospital for a few hours, through which it was determined that his kidney has lost 40% of its functionality and although his life is in immanent danger, he was moved back to Evin. He was threatened by the head of Evin courthouse that he will face a fate similar to the late filmmaker and poet, Baktash Abtin, who was killed in prison as a result of medical deprivation.

His parents waited for days from morning to night in front of the Evin prison to hear about Ronaghi, and according to Ronaghi's brother, Ronaghi's father suffered a stroke in front of the prison and was admitted to the hospital and went under a surgery on 6 November.

On 12 November, imprisoned filmmakers Jafar Panahi and Mohammad Rasoulof expressed their concerns about the condition of Ronagi in a statement issued from Evin prison, noting that there is a possibility of his heart failure at any moment. They said that as eyewitnesses imprisoned in Ward 4 of Evin prison, they are closely observing the physical conditions and the treatment of Ronaghi. They mentioned Ronaghi's hunger strike of 50 days which has resulted in his inability to walk, his high blood pressure, irregular and low heart rate, low blood pressure, low blood sugar, acute kidney failure. Additionally, Panahi and Rasoulof warned that Ronaghi has decided to go on a hunger strike starting Sunday, 13 November, and that this decision means that his life is in serious danger.

Ronaghi who is in a serious physical condition due to hunger strike in prison, was supposed to be transferred to Day Hospital on Saturday, 13 November, but according to his brother saying, he was not taken to this hospital and while they were chasing Ronaghi's ambulance, they lost them and he was kidnapped to an unknown hospital. after Ronaghi's brother announced Ronaghi's disappearance, In response to this situation hundred of people gathered in front of Day Hospital and chanted "Death to the dictator". The officers shot and fired tear gas to disperse them.

On 14 November, #HosseinRonaghi hashtag became a trend on Twitter with more than 1,800,000 uses. At the same time, Iran's Judiciary Media Center, by publishing a photo of Hossein Ronaghi, whose mother is also present at his bedside, described his physical condition as "good". On the same day, in an interview with Radio Farda, Hossein Ronaghi's father called the report of the Islamic Republic's state media that his son was being treated as a "pure lie" and said that it was a game played by the interrogator and the prosecutor.

On the evening of Saturday, 26 November, Ronaghi was temporarily released on bail from Evin prison and transferred to a hospital in Tehran for treatment after 64 days of hunger strike.

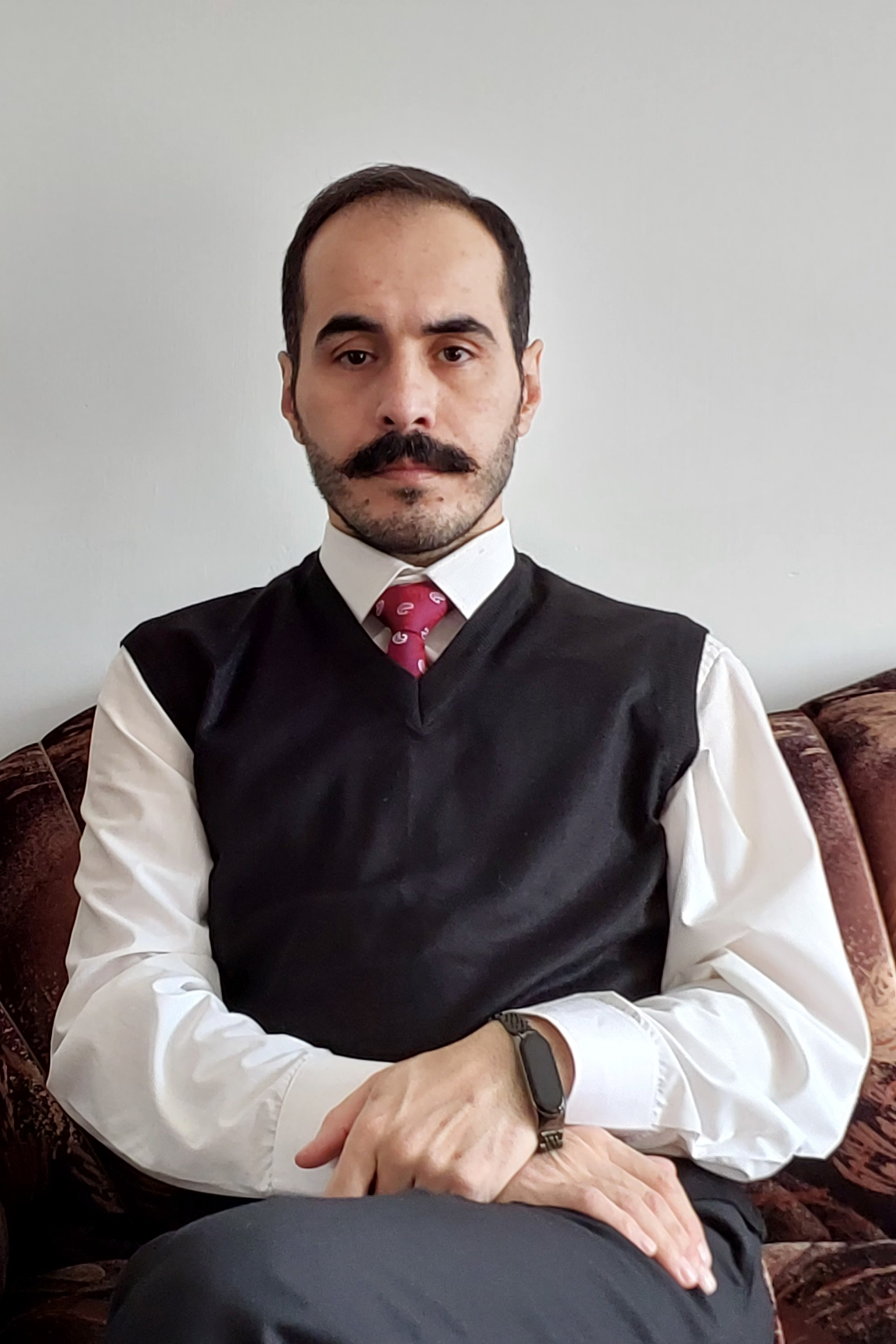
Ronaghi's post after his temporarily release and treatment on 6 December 2022

On 6 December, Ronaghi posted a photo of himself adding his hometown, Malekan, and the song "Baraye" to the post on his social media accounts. Starting with "Women, Life, Freedom", he wrote in his post Mohammad Mohtari's poem "Quotation" from "Interior Makeup" book and ended his caption by writing "Write that I will forever stay in Iran and with Iranian people"

=== 15 November 2024 ===
On the morning of Friday 15 November 2024, Hossein Ronaghi was arrested by the security forces on his way to the funeral ceremony of Kianoush Sanjari, his electronic devices were confiscated and he was released after a few hours.

== Controversy ==
=== Broken legs and weight loss ===
After Iran's Judiciary Media Center published the photo of Ronaghi lying on bed in front of his mother on 14 November 2022 (one day after people protested in front of Day Hospital in response to Ronaghi's health situation), many people accused Ronaghi's family of lying that Ronaghi's legs were broken by the security forces.

On 28 November 2022, Masoud Kazemi, the journalist who first reported Ronaghi's broken legs posted that "it is known that one of his legs was damaged due to the conflict in front of the prison with the interrogators of the Ministry of Intelligence and the other leg is healthy", and stated an error occurred because multiple sources "not politically aligned" with Ronaghi attested to the information that both legs had been broken.

A few hours later, an audio file was leaked of a meeting between Basij commanders. In the audio file the deputy commander of the Basij Ghasem Ghoreyshi stated that they broke Ronaghi's both legs in the "first moments", that he is in a "bad condition" due to his hunger strike and his heart condition, and there is a possibility of his death at "any moment".

On 26 November 2022, after he was temporarily released on bail from Evin prison and transferred to a hospital in Tehran for treatment, his Brother Hassan, posted two pictures of Ronaghi lying on bed in a hospital and wrote that Ronaghi has started his treatment. On 30 November, Ronaghi's brother posted four pictures of Ronaghi shirtless after receiving eight Intravenous therapy along with therapeutic and strengthening medications, showing his massive weight loss due to his 64 days of hunger strike.

=== Basji commanders meeting ===
On 28 November 2022, following the Black Reward hacking group's access to the internal system of the Fars News Agency, this group published the audio file of the meeting between Ghasem Ghoreyshi, the deputy commander of the Basij, and media managers close to the IRGC and Basij on their Telegram account, in which the meeting Hossein Ronagi's situation in prison has also been discussed.

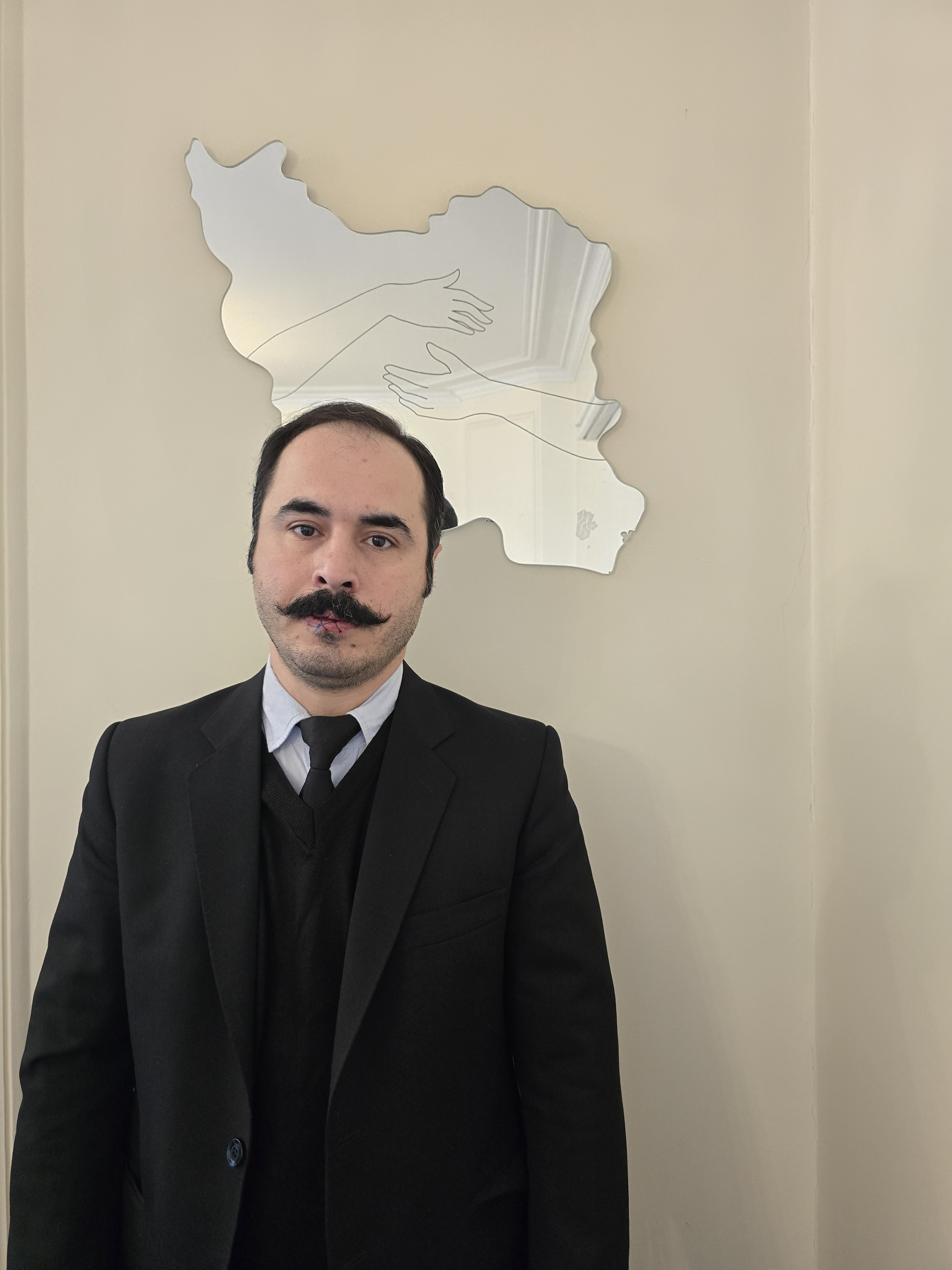
Hossein Rounaghi, human rights activist, with sewn lips

In this meeting, after Hossein Ronaghi's transfer to prison, the security officials were worried about the "repetition of Mehsa Amini's case" because of his health condition, and it is mentioned that Ronaghi is an Azari, and they compare him with Sattar Khan, the hero of Persian Constitutional Revolution. In the file, it is said that Ronagi's legs are broken in prison and his weight is greatly reduced due to hunger strike. On the other hand, due to the aggravation of Ronaghi's heart disease, the officials were worried about the possibility of his "stroke". In the following, Ghoreyshi stated that "We said that a photo should be published showing that he is healthy, sitting and his family is with him. A decision was made within two hours, he was taken there, his picture was taken and we transferred him to another hospital... he is still not well and has a heart problem. He also has many fans." According to the leaked audio file, Iran's Judiciary Media Center, published the photo of Ronaghi and his mother to "calm the situation" and to show Ronaghi's health is in "good condition".

=== Most searched on Google ===
In a Google Trends survey of Iranian users' statistics, in November 2022, the term "Hossein Ronaghi" was among the most searched on Google in Iran. 2022 FIFA World Cup, Dollar price, Lottery, Virtual private network, Abdolhamid Ismaeelzahi and Toomaj Salehi were also among the other searched terms in this month.

=== Protest action ===
In the morning of Sunday, 17 November, Hossein Ronagi published a video on social networks and announced that he will sit in front of the Islamic Revolutionary Court in protest against the crimes of the Islamic Republic. Hours later, he published a photo of himself with sewn lips on social networks.

== See also ==
- Detainees of the Mahsa Amini protests
