= Afkari =

Afkari (Persian: افکاری) is a Persian-language surname. Notable people with the surname include:

- Habib Afkari (born 1991), Iranian political dissident
- Navid Afkari (1993–2020), Iranian wrestler
