= Amir Emad Mirmirani =

Hacker and internet activist

Jadi Mirmirani
- امیرعماد میرمیرانی
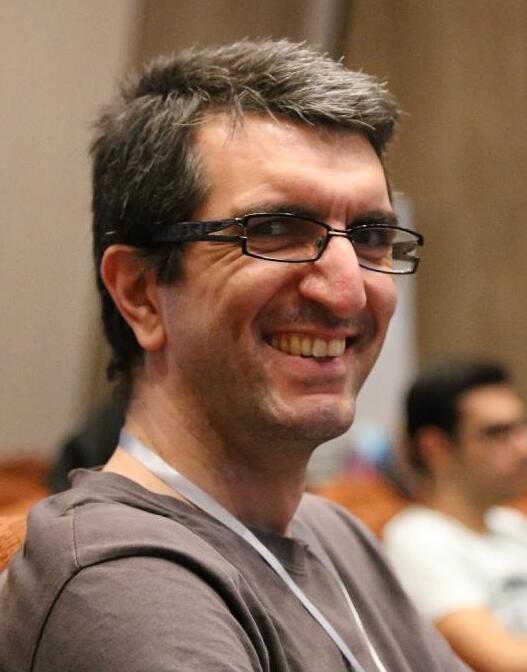
- Jadi on Software Freedom Day 2016 in Tehran
- Born: January 15, 1978 (age 48); Tehran, Iran
- Other name: Jadi Mirmirani
- Occupations: Programmer, blogger, Geek, Hacker and activist
- Website: jadi.net

AmirEmad Mirmirani (Persian: امیرعماد میرمیرانی) also known as Jadi (Persian: جادی), is an educator, programmer, blogger, Geek, Hacker and internet activist in the field of Free and open-source software and Linux in Iran. He was arrested in October 2022 amidst the Mahsa Amini protests for raising awareness about internet censorship in Iran and the role of various tech companies including Abr Arvan in it.

== Background ==
Jadi has a Bachelor of Science in Telecommunications engineering from the K. N. Toosi University of Technology and a master's degree in sociology from Allameh Tabataba'i University. He is an expert in Linux and Python and has worked in telecommunication companies with different companies around the world. He is considered one of the leading lecturers of scientific courses on Python, Blockchain, Bitcoin, Machine learning and LPIC in Iran. He is also the author and translator of technical and science fictions books. Some of his translations include Just for fun, a biographical account of Linus Torvalds, the creator of the Linux kernel and Snow Crash by Neal Stephenson.

Jadi also hosts a podcast called Radio Geek (also known as Radio Jadi). He is passionate about freedom of expression and believes in human-digital rights.

== Arrest ==
On October 5, 2022, security forces raided his house, arrested him without showing an arrest warrant and took him to Evin Prison. His arrest was believed to be in connection with his efforts educating and warning about internet censorship and Islamic Republic's plans to establish a Cyberspace service regulation system as well as raising awareness about tech companies such as Abr Arvan that cooperate with the government of Iran to cut off Iranian users' access to the internet and provide access only to domestic networks.

Shortly after the arrest, his Twitter and Instagram accounts were deactivated. His arrest was part of a wave of arrests carried out by the Government of Iran as a result of the September 2022 Iranian protests. He was released on bail on December 12, 2022. and later his case was closed without a final ruling.

== See also ==
- ‌Mahsa Amini protests
- Detainees of the September 2022 Iranian protests
- Human rights in Iran
