= Elham Afkari =

Iranian activist

- Born: Elham Afkari; Shiraz, Iran
- Known for: Sister of Navid Afkari

Elham Afkari is an Iranian activist and the sister of Navid Afkari. During the Mahsa Amini protests, on November 10, 2022, she was arrested along with her husband and their three-year-old daughter and was transferred to Detention Center No. 100 in Shiraz. She was later released.

== Arrests in 2021 ==
On June 12, 2021, Elham Afkari, along with other family members and acquaintances, protested against the 280-day solitary confinement of her two brothers, Habib and Vahid, in front of Adel-Abad Prison. Plainclothes officers allegedly assaulted them and confiscated their phones. That same day, Elham and her husband's sister were arrested but released after a few hours.

Later, on September 13, 2022, coinciding with the second anniversary of Navid Afkari’s execution, Elham, Habib Afkari, and Habib’s wife were arrested at a police checkpoint in Shiraz while en route to Navid Afkari’s grave. They were released after the ceremony. Reports indicate that both Elham and Habib Afkari resisted arrest.

== 2022 arrest ==
On November 10, 2022, Elham Afkari, her husband, and their three-year-old daughter were arrested. According to government-affiliated media, she was detained and charged with allegedly collaborating with Iran International. The Afkari family released a statement denying any cooperation between Elham and foreign media, while acknowledging her opposition to the Islamic Republic.

Mizan News Agency published an image of Elham Afkari blindfolded while in detention, an action that reportedly violated Iranian laws prohibiting the publication of an accused individual’s image before a conviction.

Although government-affiliated media initially reported that she was arrested at the Iranian border, Fars News Agency later stated that she was actually detained in Shiraz.

Saeed Afkari stated on Twitter that Elham’s husband and child, who were also detained, were released after several hours. He later tweeted that Elham was denied contact with anyone and was unaware of whether her child had been released.

The following day, images surfaced showing her mother, Behiye Namjoo, outside the Shiraz Intelligence Office, expressing distress and demanding her daughter’s release. In a widely shared video, she can be seen knocking on the office door, saying, "I will tear this door down."

Reports indicated that Elham Afkari began a hunger strike following her arrest. Another Afkari family member, Hamid Afkari, was also arrested outside the Shiraz Intelligence Detention Center while protesting her detention.

== See also ==
- 2017-2018 Iranian protests
- Navid Afkari
- Human rights violations by the Islamic Republic of Iran
