= Ezzat Goushegir =

Iranian writer

Ezzat Goushegir (Persian: عزت گوشه‌گیر) is a fiction writer and playwright born in Iran and living in the U.S. since 1986.

She has published four books in Persian, including two collections of short stories.

She began her playwriting career in 1976 when her first play "Beginning of Bloom" was produced for Iranian National Television followed by the “Middle East Odyssey” at Culture and Art Hall in Tehran. She received her MFA from the University of Iowa.

Since coming to the United States she has been writing in English and Persian. Several theater companies U.S., Canada, China, England, Sweden, and Iran have produced her plays. She currently contributes a weekly memoir and many other writings to Shahrvand, the Persian-language magazine based in Toronto, and since 2003 she has taught at DePaul University in Chicago. She is a regular contributor to literary journals, and her writing has appeared in publications in Iran, Europe, and Canada. She was a Fellow Writer in the Iowa City International Writing Program, contributed to the Conference of International Women’s Playwrights, was a Writer-in-Residence at the University of Maryland, also has been a co-director and dramaturge of a reading series at New Federal Theatre in New York. She is a member of “The Dramatists Guild of America” and “The Association of Writers and Writing Program”.

== Works/Publications ==
- The Bride of Acacias
- Gousheigir, Ezzat (2011). Afghanistan: A Window on the Tragedy. Oliver Arts & Open Press. p. 160. ISBN 978-0-981-98917-4.
- Behind the Curtains, the Story of Tahereh (recipient at a

Norman Felton award)

- The Woman, the Room, and Love
- ... And Suddenly the Leopard Cried: WOMAN
- Metamorphosis, a collection of two plays
- Adel, Kevin N; Gousheigir, Ezzat (2010). The Boy and The Red Balloon. CreateSpace Independent Publishing Platform. p. 32. ISBN 978-1-450-57914-8.
- Goushegir, Ezzat (2006). "Women's Prison, Manijeh Hekmat (director), 2002". Journal of Middle East Women's Studies. 2 (1): 138–140. doi:10.2979/MEW.2006.2.1.138.
- Maryam’s Pregnancy (Won a Richard Maibaum award)
- Migration in the Sun a book of poetry.
- Medea Was Born in Fallujah (anthologized in Witness and Crawdad in 2006) Vol. 20 Issue 1, p181-188, 8p. ISSN 0891-1371
- Now Smile (anthologized in Witness and Crawdad in 2006)
- Beginning of Bloom
- The Woman Reluctantly Said Goodbye (Persian Edition), 2013. ISBN 978-1-450-57914-8
