= Detention Center No. 100 =

Unofficial detention facility in Shiraz

- Location: Shiraz, Iran
- Status: Operational
- Capacity: Unknown
- Managed by: Ministry of Intelligence

Detention Center No. 100 (Persian: بازداشتگاه پلاک صد) is a secret, unofficial detention facility in Shiraz, operating under the supervision of Iran's Ministry of Intelligence. It is located near Adelabad Prison.

== Facility details ==
The detention center reportedly consists of three separate hallways containing six, three, and five cells, respectively. Additional hallways exist but are not in use, with inscriptions on the walls suggesting that the facility has been operational since the 1960s.

Cells in the facility are known to be extremely cold during winter, and bright lights remain on at all times, making sleep difficult for detainees. Some of the larger cells hold three to five prisoners, while smaller ones are used for solitary confinement. The outdoor yard is located behind the interrogation section.

A former political prisoner described the facility's layout as consisting of parallel hallways where cell doors face each other. When a door in an opposite hallway opens, detainees often believe it is their own cell door, creating a psychological strain over time.

== Notable incidents ==
=== Death of a prisoner ===
Reza Mohammadi, a political prisoner arrested in 2009 during a protest marking the anniversary of Persian poet Hafez, was detained at Detention Center No. 100. His family was unaware of his whereabouts for an extended period. On February 20, 2010, authorities informed them that he had been injured and was undergoing medical treatment. A few days later, the family was notified that he had died due to a "fall in the prison bathroom."

=== Navid Afkari ===
Navid Afkari, an Iranian wrestler and protester against the Iranian government, was detained in Detention Center No. 100 before being executed on September 12, 2020, in Adel-Abad Prison.

== See also ==
- Human rights in the Islamic Republic of Iran
- Ministry of Intelligence (Iran)
