= Elnaz Mohammadi =

Iranian journalist

- Persian: الناز محمدی
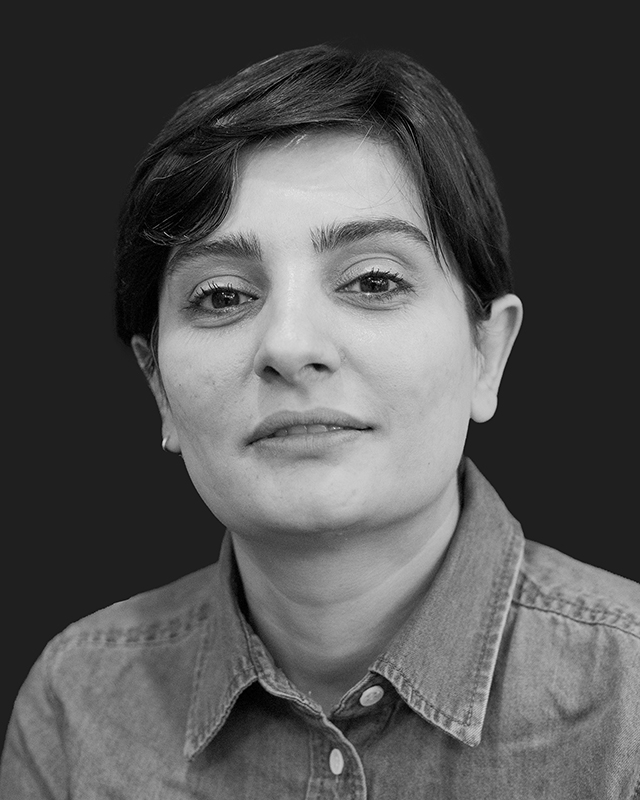
- Born: Elnaz Mohammadi; May 9, 1987 (age 39); Tehran, Iran
- Education: Islamic Azad University, Central Tehran Branch
- Occupation: Journalist
- Relatives: Elaheh Mohammadi (sister)

Elnaz Mohammadi (Persian: الناز محمدی; born May 9, 1987 in Tehran) is an Iranian journalist and former social group secretary of the Ham-Mihan newspaper. She and her twin sister Elaheh Mohammadi were arrested by Islamic Revolutionary Guard Corps during Mahsa Amini protests. In 2026, she was awarded a Courage in Journalism Award by the International Women’s Media Foundation.

== Arrests ==
Mohammadi was arrested on February 5, 2023 after receiving a summons, and appeared in the Evin Prison courthouse. She was released on bail a few days later on February 11, 2023.

In September 2023, she was acquitted by Branch 26 of the Tehran Revolutionary Court of the charge of cooperation with hostile foreign countries due to the lack of proof of the crime and lack of evidence. According to the same verdict, she was sentenced to three years in prison on charges of conspiracy and collusion, one fortieth of which to be enforced and the rest suspended for five years.

On October 28, 2023, Mohammadi reported to Evin Prison to commence the execution of her suspended sentence, along with additional penalties that had been imposed. She announced later in December of the same year she was forced to resign as the secretary of the social group of Ham-Mihan newspaper.

== See also ==
- Mahsa Amini protests
- Elaheh Mohammadi
- Detainees of the Mahsa Amini protests
