= Sanjari =

Sanjari (Persian: سنجری) is an Iranian surname. Notable people with the surname include:

- Ahmad Sanjari (born 1960), Iranian professional footballer
- Heshmat Sanjari (1917–1995), Iranian conductor and composer
- Kianush Sanjari (1982–2024), Iranian journalist and activist
