= Yalda Moaiery =

Iranian photographer

- Persian: یلدا معیری
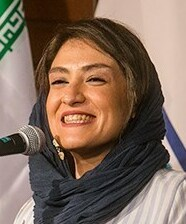
- Occupation: Photojournalist
- Known for: Photography work in topics including war, natural disasters, and protests.

Yalda Moaiery (Persian: یلدا معیری) is an Iranian photojournalist. She is best known for photography work in topics including war, protests, and natural disasters. In 2019, she gained international attention after Donald Trump used one of her photos on social media to support an attack on Iran, which she publicly spoke out on. During the Mahsa Amini protests in 2022, she was one of several journalists arrested in Iran. She is a member of the Iranian Photojournalists Association (IPJA).

== Background ==
Throughout her career, Moaiery has documented wars, conflicts and natural disasters in parts of the world including Iran, Afghanistan, Iraq and Lebanon. Her photographs have been featured in international magazines and newspapers, such as Time, Newsweek, San Francisco Chronicle, Le Monde and El Pais.

Moaiery’s 20-year career has taken her around the world but her work also focuses on life in Iran, including mass protests in 2019 over rising fuel prices. Her portfolio includes photo essays on women serving in the Iranian military and the legacy of Iran’s Supreme Leader Khomeini.

In 2019, she gained notoriety when she spoke out against President Donald Trump after he used one of her photos on instagram to attack the Iranian government. She is 44 years old as 2026.

== Arrest ==
Moaiery was arrested on September 19, 2022 by security agents in downtown Tehran while covering the protests that erupted after the death of Mahsa Amini while in the custody of the morality police in Tehran. Moaiery was reportedly hit during her arrest and forced into a van with tens of other female protesters before being taken to Qarchak prison, a female-only detention facility in the city of Varamin, southeast of Tehran.

After the news of Moaiery’s arrest surfaced, the Tehran Province Journalists' Association issued a statement demanding her immediate release, saying that she had been detained “while staunchly defending colleagues’ freedom of movement in covering events”. She was released on bail on December 20, 2022.

On August 8, 2026, Moaiery was sentenced to 15 years in jail by the Islamic Revolutionary Court after being accused of giving interviews to media outlets considered unfriendly by the Iranian regime and delivering images to organizations purportedly connected to the US and Israel.

== See also ==
- Niloofar Hamedi
- Elaheh Mohammadi
