= Adelabad Prison =

Prison in Shiraz, Iran

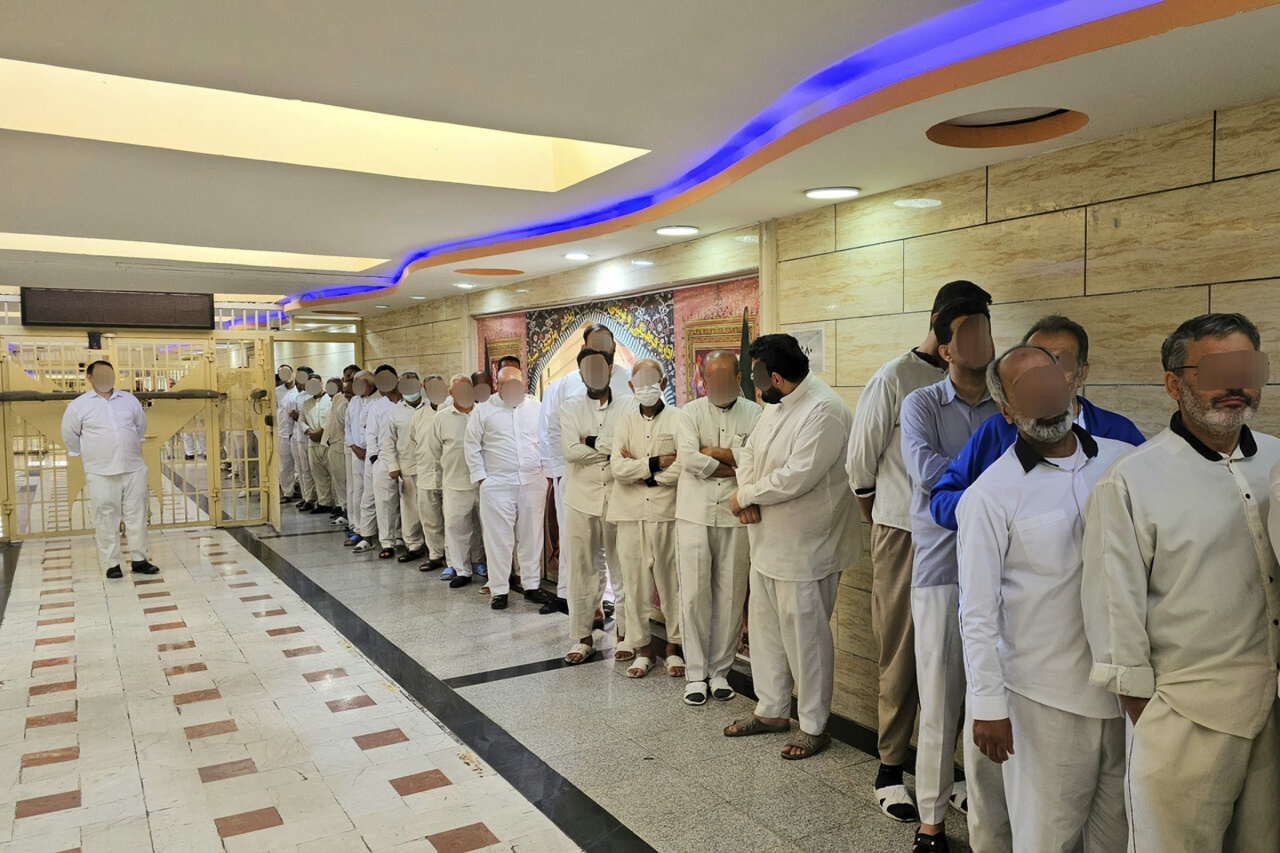
- Elections held inside Adelabad Prison

- Location within Iran
- Location: Shiraz, Iran; 29°34′35.4″N 52°30′24.9″E
- Status: Operational
- Capacity: 7,000 inmates
- Opened: 1972; 54 years ago
- Managed by: Judiciary of the Islamic Republic of Iran
- Director: Rouhollah Rezaei Dana (acting)

Adelabad Prison (Persian: زندان عادل‌آباد) is a prison located in the southern Shiraz, Iran.

As the central prison of Shiraz, Adelabad was initially constructed in an uninhabited area south of the city. However, due to the expansion of Shiraz, it is now located within the urban limits.

Several notable political prisoners have been incarcerated here, including Navid Afkari, Kasra Nouri, Vahid Afkari, Ali-Akbar Masoumi Beigi, and Ezzatollah Sahabi, from pre-1979 Revolution to the present.

== Description ==
Adelabad Prison is one of the largest prisons in Iran. Constructed during the 1970s, it was originally located outside the city limits, but today, it is within the city's urban fabric.

The prison's official name is Shiraz Central Prison, but it is widely known as Adelabad Prison due to its location in the Adelabad district.

== Structure ==
Adelabad Prison consists of two main sections: the central detention center and the main prison facility. These are two separate buildings within the same complex.

The prison has 14 wards, with those convicted of serious crimes such as murder, armed robbery, and first-degree kidnapping typically held in Wards 10 and 11, officially named "Hemat Ward" and "Neshat Ward," considered among the most notorious within the facility.

Other prisons in Shiraz include Pirbanoo Prison (for drug-related offenses) and the Shiraz Military Prison.

Due to concerns regarding public safety and urban planning, Shiraz City Council has proposed relocating Adelabad Prison outside the city. This plan, first discussed in 2007, aims to improve mental health and security in the metropolitan area and create better conditions for prisoner rehabilitation.

== Prison Facilities ==
=== Medical Services ===
Reports indicate that medical care in Adelabad Prison is inadequate, with inmates sometimes waiting 10 to 15 days to see a doctor. Some cases of untreated illnesses have led to severe health complications and even deaths.

=== Educational and Recreational Facilities ===
Authorities claim the prison offers vocational training in 15 fields. There is also a designated room for incarcerated mothers to play with their children.

== Notable Events ==
=== 2020 Riot ===
On 29 March 2020, a riot erupted in Adelabad Prison due to inmates protesting their conditions amid the COVID-19 pandemic and their exclusion from furlough programs. Some reports indicated gunfire was heard, though authorities denied any escape attempts.

=== 2021 Political Prisoners' Hunger Strike ===
On 19 March 2021, political prisoners at Adelabad, along with inmates in Evin Prison and Greater Tehran Central Prison, staged a three-day hunger strike in protest against injustice and in solidarity with impoverished Iranians.

=== U.S. Treasury Sanctions ===
On 24 September 2020, the U.S. Department of the Treasury sanctioned Adelabad Prison for human rights violations. The sanctions followed the execution of Navid Afkari, and also targeted Judge Mahmoud Sadeati for his role in Afkari's case.

=== European Union sanctions ===
In April 2025, the European Union sanctioned Adelabad Prison, citing its involvement in the unlawful detention of several European citizens. According to the EU, these individuals were held as hostages, denied access to a fair trial, and subjected to severe violations of their most basic rights. The sanctions included an asset freeze and were part of broader measures targeting Iran's human rights abuses and treatment of dual and foreign nationals.

== See also ==
- Prisons in Iran
- Qarchak Prison
- Vakilabad Prison
