= Sangar, Sepidan =

Sangar سنگر
- Village
- Location within Iran
- Coordinates: 29°59′45″N 52°08′45″E
- Country: Iran
- Province: Fars
- County: Sepidan
- Bakhsh: Hamaijan
- Rural District: Hamaijan

Population (2006)
  - Total: 622
- Time zone: UTC+3:30 (IRST)
  - Summer (DST): UTC+4:30 (IRDT)

Sangar (Persian: سنگر) is a village in Hamaijan Rural District, Hamaijan District, Sepidan County, Fars province, Iran. At the 2006 census, its population was 622, in 137 families.

== Notable people ==
- Navid Afkari
