= World Press Freedom Prize =

Press freedom prize

The UNESCO/Guillermo Cano World Press Freedom Prize, created in 1997, honours a person, organization or institution that has made an outstanding contribution to the defence and/or promotion of press freedom anywhere in the world, especially when this has been achieved in the face of danger.

The prize, worth US$ 25,000, is awarded each year on the occasion of World Press Freedom Day on 3 May.

The prize is named after Guillermo Cano Isaza, the editor of the Colombian newspaper El Espectador, who was murdered in Bogotá on 17 December 1986. Cano was a vocal critic of the country's powerful drug barons.

Each year, an independent jury of six news professionals selected by the UNESCO Director-General selects a winner from the many nominations submitted by non-governmental organizations working in the field of press freedom, and by UNESCO Member States. The jury remains in charge for a period of three years, renewable once.

The anti-mafia Italian journalist Marilù Mastrogiovanni serves as chair of the jury as of 2021. Other members of the Jury are:

- Wendy Funes (Honduras), investigative journalist;
- David Dembele (Mali), Editor-in-chief of the Depêche du Mali/L’Investigateur;
- Hamid Mir (Pakistan), Executive Editor of Geo Television Pakistan;
- Alfred Lela (Albania), Political Analyst on News 24 and Founder and Director of Politiko;
- Zainab Salbi (Iraq), As a journalist, she created and hosted several shows including: #MeToo, Now What? on PBS (2018)

== Award winners ==
| Year | Recipient | Country |
|---|---|---|
| 1997 | Gao Yu | China |
| 1998 | Christina Anyanwu | Nigeria |
| 1999 | Jesús Blancornelas | Mexico |
| 2000 | Nizar Nayyouf | Syria |
| 2001 | Win Tin | Myanmar |
| 2002 | Geoffrey Nyarota | Zimbabwe |
| 2003 | Amira Hass | Israel |
| 2004 | Raúl Rivero | Cuba |
| 2005 | Cheng Yizhong | China |
| 2006 | May Chidiac | Lebanon |
| 2007 | Anna Politkovskaya | Russia (posthumous award) |
| 2008 | Lydia Cacho Ribeiro | Mexico |
| 2009 | Lasantha Wickrematunge | Sri Lanka (posthumous award) |
| 2010 | Mónica González Mujica | Chile |
| 2011 | Ahmad Zeidabadi | Iran |
| 2012 | Eynulla Fatullayev | Azerbaijan |
| 2013 | Reeyot Alemu | Ethiopia |
| 2014 | Ahmet Şık | Turkey |
| 2015 | Mazen Darwish | Syria |
| 2016 | Khadija Ismayilova | Azerbaijan |
| 2017 | Dawit Isaak | Sweden/Eritrea |
| 2018 | Mahmoud Abu Zeid | Egypt |
| 2019 | Kyaw Soe Oo & Wa Lone | Myanmar |
| 2020 | Jineth Bedoya Lima | Colombia |
| 2021 | Maria Ressa | Philippines |
| 2022 | Belarusian Association of Journalists | Belarus |
| 2023 | Niloofar Hamedi, Elaheh Mohammadi, Narges Mohammadi | Iran |
| 2024 | Palestinian journalists covering Gaza | Palestine |
| 2025 | La Prensa newspaper | Nicaragua |
| 2026 | Sudanese Journalists Syndicate | Sudan |

== See also ==
- World Press Freedom Day
- William O. Douglas Prize
