= Saeed Shirzad =

Iranian political prisoner

- Persian: سعید شیرزاد
- Born: Saeed Shirzad; 1989 (age 35–36); Kermanshah, Iran
- Known for: Human rights activists

Saeed Shirzad (Persian: سعید شیرزاد; born in Kermanshah), is an Iranian human rights activists who's been on several long hunger strikes. His arrest and hunger strike have been widely reflected on news agencies and the social medias. Saeed was detained on June 8, 2014. He spent more than two months in Evin Prison without being in touch with his family and lawyer. He was finally sentenced to five years in prison in September 2015, after Branch 15 of the Revolutionary Court convicted him of “gathering and colluding to commit crimes against national security.

== Hunger strike ==
He went on hunger strike on December 7, 2016 in protest to the inappropriate situation of the Gohardasht Prison, including "continuous insult to the families of prisoners, failure to accept official letters of hunger strike, which would discredit medical officials from prison authorities, detain members of the families of political prisoners at the meeting hall, beating political prisoners.

Saeed Shirzad, sewed his lips shut in protest at what he described in a letter to judicial officials as “the quiet death of prisoners” at Rajaei Shahr Prison of Karaj. He ended his 39-day hunger strike on 14 January after the authorities at Karaj's Raja’i Shahr Prison made an oral promise to address his grievances about the inhumane treatment of political prisoners in the prison.

== See also ==
- Detainees of the Mahsa Amini protests
