= Kianush Sanjari =

Iranian blogger (1982–2024)

- کیانوش سنجری
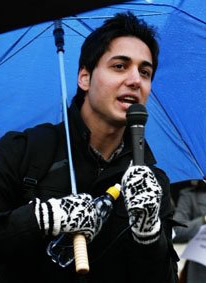
- Sanjari in 2008
- Born: 11 September 1982; Tehran, Iran
- Died: 13 November 2024 (aged 42); Tehran, Iran
- Other names: Kianoosh Sanjari, Kianush Sanjari Baf, Kiyanoosh Sanjari
- Known for: Political activist, political prisoner, journalist

Kianush Sanjari (Persian: کیانوش سنجری; 11 September 1982 – 13 November 2024) was an Iranian journalist and activist. He had a history of being arrested and imprisoned in solitary confinement several times in Iran.

Sanjari previously worked for Voice of America Persian News Network in Washington D.C., from 2008 to 2013. He also worked as a researcher for the Boroumand Foundation, the Iran Human Rights Documentation Center, and the Iran Human Rights organization in Norway. He was a former student blogger.

== Biography ==
Sanjari was born in Tehran on 11 September 1982. He was arrested in Iran several times by the security forces, between 1999 and 2007, and served two years in Evin Prison, then he fled Iran to Iraqi Kurdistan. He received asylum from Amnesty International and traveled to Norway, and then later traveled to the United States.

In 2016, Sanjari returned to Iran to care for his aging mother, after several years of working with Persian-language media abroad. But just a few days after arriving in Tehran, he was arrested by intelligence ministry agents and taken to Ward 209 at Evin Prison. He was interrogated and after a trial that lasted only minutes, Branch 26 of the Revolutionary Court sentenced him to 11 years in prison. He would have to serve a minimum of five years. He was also banned from leaving Iran for two years after serving his sentence.

In early 2019, after serving three years of his sentence, Sanjari fell sick and the prison doctor ruled that he must be granted a medical leave of absence. Instead, he was quickly transferred to Aminabad Psychiatric Hospital. "One day they handcuffed me, put me in a car and transferred me, under guard, to Aminabad, also known as Razi, Psychiatric Hospital. They took me directly to the ward and two soldiers stood guard over me. At night the nurse injected me with something that for all intents and purposes locked my jaw. I fell unconscious after the injection and, in the morning when I woke up, I saw that my hands and feet were chained to the bed." He describes this moment as the "most painful" of his life. By order of the Special Medical Committee, Sanjari was hospitalized several more times. He reported that during one of these hospitalizations, he was subjected to electric shocks nine times.

He was later on medical furlough, but was required to regularly present himself at Evin Prison, reporting to the office responsible for monitoring people convicted or charged with security offenses.

Amnesty International emphasized the case of Sanjari in its campaign for freedom of expression irrepressible.info, as Sanjari's charges stopped him from commenting and reporting the clashes on his blog, in a country where state media is heavily censored.

== White torture ==
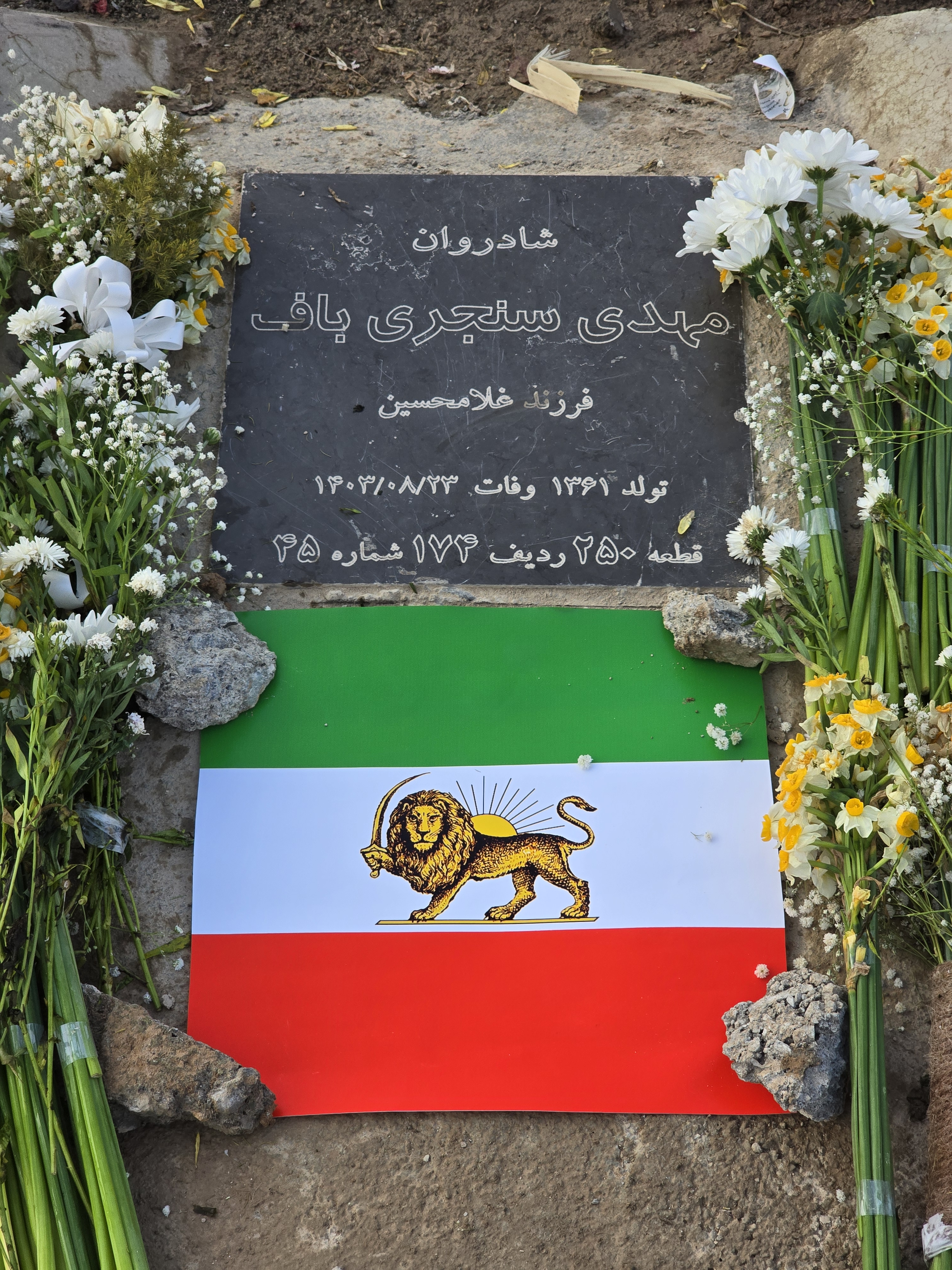
The grave of Kianush Sanjari in December 2024

After being arrested and taken to solitary confinement in Evin Prison, he allegedly experienced white torture and commented:

"I feel that solitary confinement - which wages war on the soul and mind of a person - can be the most inhuman form of white torture for people like me, who are arrested solely for [defending] citizens' rights. I only hope the day comes when no one is put in solitary confinement [to punish them] for the peaceful expression of his ideas."

== Death ==
Sanjari reportedly died by suicide in Tehran, on 13 November 2024, at the age of 42 after jumping off a building. About 20 hours before his death, he warned on X that if the political prisoners Fatemeh Sepehri, Nasrin Shakarami, Toomaj Salehi, and Arsham Rezaei are not released from prison, he would commit suicide in protest against the dictatorship.
