= Abr Arvan =

Iranian cloud service provider

- Founded: 2015
- Parent: Fanap
- Website: arvancloud.ir/en

Abr Arvan (Persian: ابر آروان) is an Iranian content delivery network and cloud service company. As of 2020, it provided free cloud services to 300 Iranian companies. It also provides VOD, radar (network availability), object storage, Infrastructure as a service and Platform as a service to its buyers. According to Donya-e-Eqtesad it provides the cloud ecosystem for Iran. It had fifty thousand clients in 2020. Based on W3techs abr arvan is the eighth CDN provider in the world.

According to Fanap boss 75% of the Arvan team has immigrated out of Iran within period of 2022-2023.

== History ==
Abr Arvan started in 2014 with the aim of producing cloud technological products. The founding team consisted of four people, whose first acquaintance was formed in the World Skills Competition. These people were selected as the first team product in March 2015 in the Fanap Innovation Competition. After a few months, with the initial investment of Fanap in the amount of 300 million Tomans, the official activity of this company began and in January 2015, it was officially registered. In March of the same year, this company was accepted in the section of knowledge-based companies as a "start-up level 1" company. In 2018, the second stage of increasing the capital of this company with a valuation of 200 billion Tomans was done by Fanap Holding and the total shares of this holding reached 47%.

== Security issues ==
=== DDOS Susceptibility ===
In 2018, a Telegram MTProto MTProxy based DDOS took down Arvan's networks.

=== Service outages ===
In March 2021, IaaS and PaaS services of Abr Arvan were targeted by large attacks, forcing the company to take off its data centers from the public network. The outage lasted for several days.

== Controversies ==
=== Involvement in National Information Network ===
In 2021, Arvan engaged in a contract with Ministry of ICT of Iran on Iran Cloud project. The project is set to deploy National Information Network, a network that allows the Iranian government to cut off Iranian users' access to the internet and provide them only domestic networks. Abr Arvan's Public Relations Manager has denied the company's involvement in the Internet nationalization or restriction project.

=== EU Sanctions ===
In 2022, a collaboration between Correctiv, Die Tageszeitung and netzpolitik.org claimed that a German company supports Abr Arvan in circumventing sanctions.

In 14 November 2022 European Union imposed sanctions on the Iranian cloud provider Arvancloud. Claiming that "Arvan Cloud is an Iranian IT company supporting the Iranian government's efforts to control access to the Iranian intranet. Since 2020, it is a major partner in the project of the Iranian government, in general, and the Iranian Minister of Information and Communications Technology, in particular, to set up a separate, Iranian version of the internet. Such a national intranet with connecting points to the global internet will help to control the flow of information between the Iranian intranet and the global internet. As such, Arvan Cloud is involved in censorship and efforts of the Iranian government to shut down the internet in response to recent protests in Iran. Arvan Cloud is also associated with persons responsible for serious human rights violations in Iran, notably the EU-listed Iranian Minister of Information and Communications Technology."

The measures imposed by the sanction, consist of a travel ban and an asset freeze. In addition, EU citizens and companies are forbidden from making funds available to the company.

In early April 2024, the EU announced the revocation of sanctions against Arvan Cloud following a legal complaint lodged by the company.

=== US Sanctions ===
In June 2023, the U.S. Department of the Treasury's Office of Foreign Assets Control designated sanctions against Arvan Cloud, two senior employees of Arvan Cloud, and an affiliated company based in the United Arab Emirates for their roles in facilitating the Iranian regime's censorship of the Internet in Iran.

== Other products ==
- Streaming services
- cloud domain name systems
- datacenter
- DDoS mitigation
