= Fatemeh Sepehri =

Iranian activist

- فاطمه سپهری
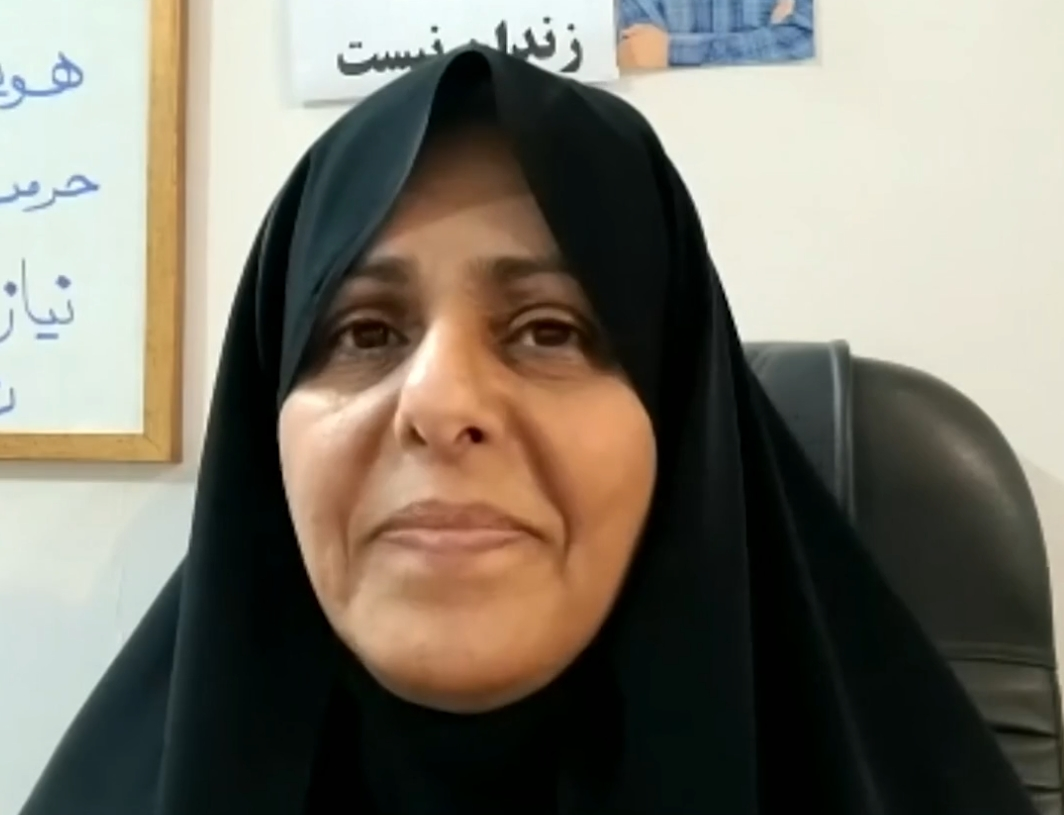
- Sepehri in 2022
- Born: 1964 (age 61–62)
- Years active: 2009–present
- Known for: Political and women's rights activist, political prisoner

Fatemeh Sepehri (Persian: فاطمه سپهری; born 1964) is a political and women's rights activist and a political prisoner from Iran.

== Personal life ==
Fatemeh Sepehri was born in 1964.

She married and had a daughter. Her husband was killed in the 1980s, during the Iran-Iraq War. After his death, the Foundation of Martyrs and Veteran Affairs confiscated Sepehri's belongings, telling Sepehri they would be returned to her daughter once she was a legal adult.

In 2004, at age 40, she received a bachelor’s degree in business management from Ferdowsi University of Mashhad.

== Political activism ==
Sepehri began working as a political activist following Iran's 2009 elections.

Sepehri was detained in Mashhad on Sunday, August 1, 2021 during a peaceful demonstration in support of the protesters in the southwestern province of Khuzestan and to protest the heightened security climate in the country. The demonstrators were also demanding the release of political prisoners.

=== Statement of 14 Political Activists ===
Sepehri and her brother, Mohammad Hossein Sepehri, are two of the signatories of the Statement of 14 Political Activists during the 2017–2018 Iranian protests requesting the resignation of Ali Khamenei from his post as the Supreme Leader of the Islamic Republic and later the abolition of Islamic republic and establishment of a democratic secular government.

After signing the letter, Sepehri received a great deal of attention due to her status as the widow of a war casualty, and came to be known as a martyr's widow. Iranian authorities did not expect the wife of a martyr with strong religious beliefs to urge Khamenei to resign and advocate a secular democratic governing system to replace the Islamic Republic regime.

Shortly after the publication of the two letters, authorities arrested Fatemeh Sepehri, her brother Mohammad Hossein and other signatories to the petitions during a protest in front of the Islamic Azad University of Mashhad. Fatemeh Sepehri was charged with “disorderly conduct, inciting unrest and propagating lies” and sentenced to five years in prison and 154 lashes. She ultimately received a suspended sentence and was released from prison after nine months.

== 2022 arrest and imprisonment ==
During a wave of arrests as a result of Mahsa Amini protests, Sepehri was arrested on September 21 and taken to an unknown location after security agents raided her house.

On October 23, 2022, Sepehri's daughter published a video stating that her mother had been kept in solitary confinement at the Islamic Revolutionary Guard Corps Intelligence center of Mashhad since her arrest, and after enduring more than a month in solitary confinement she can barely speak. The family's appeal to the case investigator and deputy prosecutor of the Mashhad court to transfer her to the general ward was ineffective.

In February 2023, Sepehri was given an 18 year prison sentence for "propaganda activities against the Islamic republic", "cooperation with hostile governments", "insulting the late Ayatollah Ruhollah Khomeini and Ali Khamenei", and "gathering and conspiring against national security". As of June 2023, she was being held in Vakilabad Prison.

By September 2023, Sepehri was in need of heart surgery. She announced she would only to consent to surgery if her brothers, Hassan Sepehri and Mohammad-Hossein Sepehri, were released from detainment. She underwent her heart surgery on October 1, and was released from hospital and returned to prison on October 7. In December, Sepehri continued to struggle with health issues, including an elevated heart rate that made speaking difficult.

In early April 2024, a judge accused Sepehri of supporting Israel after video was released in which she condemned Hamas' attacks against Israel on October 7, 2023 and Iranian support of Hamas. In mid-April, one of Sepehri's brothers reported on social media that his sister had faced "psychological torture" during an interrogation in Mashdad. on 6 June 2024, she was sentenced to 18 and a half years jail for having supported Israel.

In May 2025, Sepehri was hospitalized multiple times for "severe heart palpitations, chest pain, and low blood pressure". In September 2025, her family reported she had "severe pain in both hands" and has "painful masses" on her shoulders and chest.

== See also ==
- ‌Mahsa Amini protests
- Detainees of the Mahsa Amini protests
- Women's rights in Iran
- Human rights in Iran
