= Sarvenaz Ahmadi =

Iranian social worker and journalist (born 1998)

Sarvenaz Ahmadi (Persian: سروناز احمدی; born 1998) is an Iranian social worker and journalist who was sentenced to six years imprisonment after taking part in the Mahsa Amini protests in 2022.

== Career ==
Ahmadi obtained a master's degree in social work from the University of Social Welfare and Rehabilitation Sciences in Tehran. She went on to work as a social worker primarily working with children in poor neighbourhoods of Tehran. Ahmadi also worked as a freelance journalist focusing on politics, labour unions, and children's rights for outlets including Meidaan and SMT. While in prison, Ahmadi wrote several open letters criticising the treatment of detainees within the Iranian prison system, in addition to xenophobic policies passed by the Iranian government against Afghan refugees.

In 2022, Ahmadi married Kamyar Fakour, an environment and labour journalist.

== Arrest, trial and imprisonment ==
In September 2022, widespread civil unrest and protests broke out across Iran following the death in police custody of Mahsa Amini after allegedly violating Iran's mandatory hijab law. Ahmadi began to document the protests on her Twitter account, attending protests with her husband. Ahmadi was briefly arrested before being released, following which her Twitter account was deleted. On 6 November 2022, Ahmadi and her husband were arrested for a second time and detained until 7 December when they were released on bail.

On 3 January 2023, Branch 15 of the Tehran Revolutionary Court sentenced Ahmadi to five years imprisonment for "gathering and colluding with the intention of acting against national security". She received an additional one-year sentence for "propaganda activities against the state". Fakour received a one-year sentence. Both Ahmadi and Fakour's lawyers were prevented from attending the sentencing hearing. Ahmadi appealed the sentence, and Branch 36 of the Tehran Court of Appeals subsequently reduced it to three years and six months in prison, with the possibility of applying for conditional release after serving one year and nine months of her sentence.

On 10 May 2023, Ahmadi and Fakour were arrested and both taken to Evin Prison in Tehran to begin serving their sentences. In August 2023, both of them were denied amnesty due to their alleged membership in "hostile groups with the intention of topping the Islamic Republic". Fakour was released from prison in November 2024.

Ahmadi's family and lawyers reported that her mental and physical health had declined in prison, including experiencing panic attacks and fainting episodes. On 14 August 2024, Ahmadi's mother stated that Ahmadi had been diagnosed with epilepsy whilst in prison. A doctor who medically assessed Ahmadi stated that prison conditions were triggering her epilepsy and recommended that she be granted urgent medical leave. This request was initially ignored by prison authorities, and between 9 September and 6 October 2024, Ahmadi stopped taking her medication in protest against the denial of her request for medical leave, in addition to wider issues with the treatment of detainees and "inhumane conditions" within Evin Prison. On 4 October, Mary Lawlor, the UN special rapporteur on the situation of human rights defenders, released a statement expressing concern for Ahmadi's welfare and called on the Iranian government to release her so she could access urgent medical care.

On 29 December 2024, Ahmadi was granted conditional release on health grounds.
