= Nazila Maroufian =

Iranian journalist

- Persian: نازیلا معروفیان
- Born: 20 May 2000 (age 25)
- Occupation: Journalist
- Known for: Interview with Mahsa Amini's father and fight against compulsory hijab

Nazila Maroufian (Persian: نازیلا معروفیان; born 20 May 2000) is an Iranian civil activist, political prisoner and journalist who works for the news media Roydad 24.

Maroufian has been arrested and released several times since the beginning of the Mahsa Amini protests in September 2022. She is being held in Evin Prison as of September 2023. She was first arrested for interviewing Mahsa Jina Amini's father about the details of his daughter's death.

== Early life and education ==
Maroufian, was born in Saqqez and lives in Tehran. She is a graduate of Allameh Tabatabai University and a reporter of "Event 24" and "Mostaghel Online".

== Journalism and imprisonment ==
=== First arrest and imprisonment ===
Maroufian published her interview with Amjad Amini, the father of Mahsa Jina Amini, on 14 October 2022. After this, she reported that she was being threatened by the security forces of Iran with arrest. She also tweeted: "Finally, I published the interview with Mehsa Amini's father. I would like to thank the news media of "Mostaghel online", for publishing this interview. Another point is that I neither intend to commit suicide nor have any underlying disease. In this tweet thread, I will write the important points of this interview". In the interview Amjad Amini said that the Deputy Medical Examiner had told him that he would write "whatever is for the good of the country" about his daughter's death.

Maroufian was arrested on 30 October 2022, and was transferred to Detention Centre 209 in Evin Prison.

On 5 January 2023, Maroufian underwent cardiac arrest and was taken to the hospital.

On 28 January 2023, Maroufian announced that she was sentenced by the court presided over by Judge Afshari to two years of imprisonment, five years of curfew and a fine of 15 million tomans.

=== Dismissal from work ===
In May 2023, Maroufian announced that she was fired from her workplace for narrating the sexual abuse committed by a special unit agent. She described such actions to commit suicide or escape and declared that she would stay in Iran under any circumstances.

=== Subsequent arrest ===
On 8 July 2023, Maroufian was arrested again for defying Iran's compulsory hijab law and was transferred to Evin prison. Before this, the intelligence forces entered her house and confiscated her laptop and phone, searched her house, and ordered her to go to the prosecutor's office on 8 July.

After the re-arrest of Maroufian, Committee to Protect Journalists issued a statement on 12 July 2023 which condemned her arrest and demanded her unconditional release.

On 24 August 2023, she was arrested for the fourth time after supporting Mehdi Yarrahi, a fellow Iranian activist and musician.

== Forced departure from Iran ==
Maroufian said that she was sexually assaulted during her last arrest by Iran's government agents who arrested her.

She also went from Iran to Iraqi Kurdistan and from there to France because Iran's government agents had told her mother that she would be killed.

== See also ==
- Compulsory Hijab in Iran
- Iranian protests against compulsory hijab
- Human rights in Iran
- Reactions to the Mahsa Amini protests
- Elaheh Mohammadi
- Niloofar Hamedi
