= Irrepressible.info =

2006 anti-internet censorship campaign

irrepressible.info
- Website type: Campaign website
- Commercial: No
- Launched: 2006
- Current status: inactive

irrepressible.info was an anti-Internet censorship campaign and website by Amnesty International and The Observer. It was developed in 2006 by Soda Creative and hosted by Darq Ltd. The site was based in the United Kingdom and open to participation from people around the world.

The site allowed users to republish excerpts of allegedly censored sites. These excerpts linked back to irrepressible.info, where visitors could learn more about the censored site in question.

Visitors were also invited to sign a pledge opposing online repression. Amnesty presented this petition with over 50,000 signatures at the November 2006 United Nations Internet Governance Forum in Athens.

irrepressible.info was based on an idea by Alexander Kohlhofer and was created to mark the 45th anniversary of Amnesty International.

== Some of the sites listed as censored ==
- Open Society Institute (OSI) & Soros Foundation Network; see also Open Society Institute
- Forum of the Ferghana.run Information Agency (main site available in English, forum in Russian); see Fergana for another entry to portal
- OSI Burma Project Southeast Asia Initiative
- Women's League of Burma; see also Women's League of Burma
- Reveil Tunisien.org (in French)
- Mang Lu'oi Nhan Quyen Viet Nam (Vietnam Human Rights Network); see also Human rights in Vietnam
- Levant News, daily from the Levant Institute (in Arabic, also available in English)
- Amnesty International; see also Amnesty International
- Human Rights In China; see also Human rights in the People's Republic of China
- Free Tibet; see also International Tibet Independence Movement
