= Elaheh Mohammadi =

Iranian journalist

- Persian: الهه محمدی
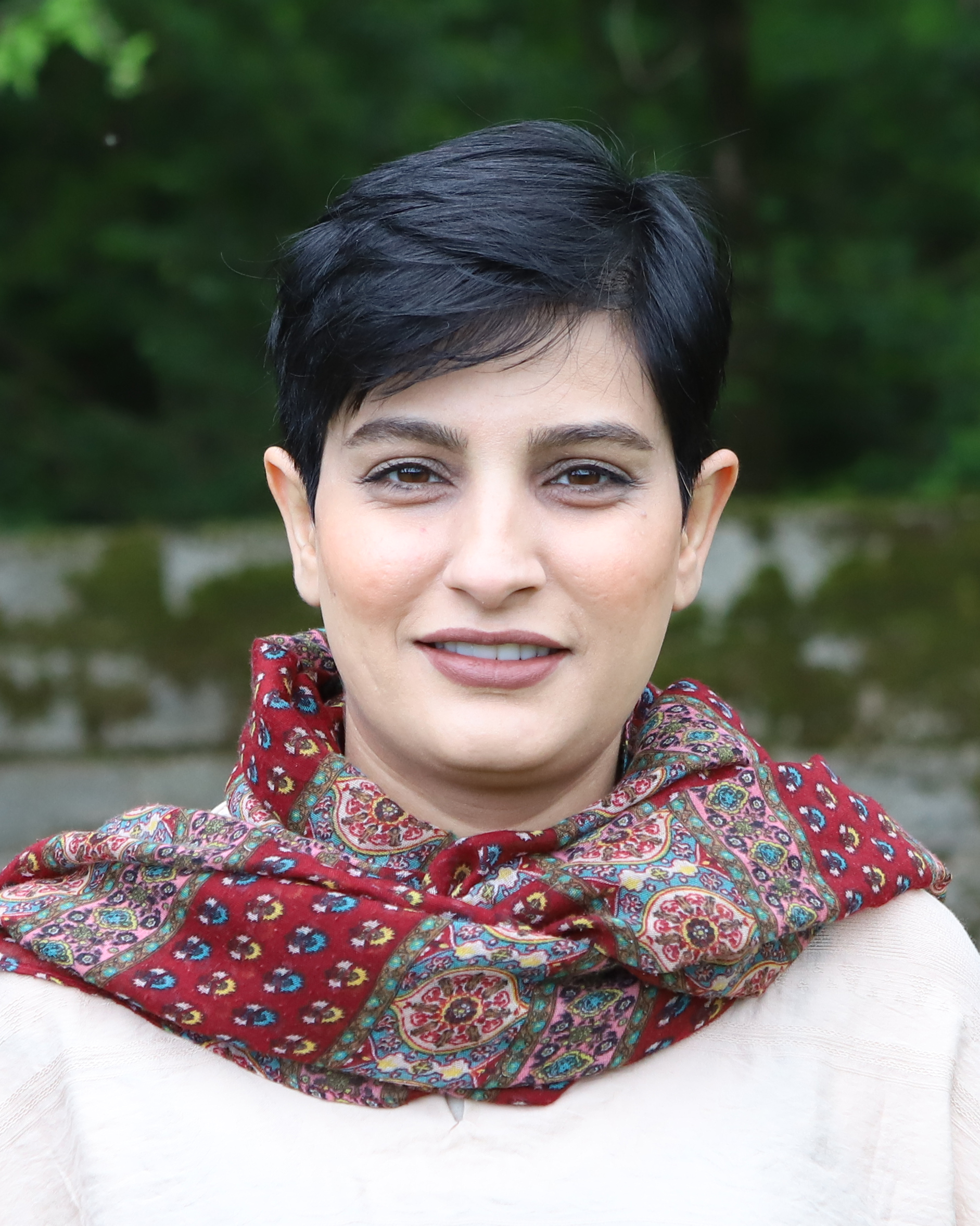
- Born: 9 May 1987 (age 39)
- Occupation: Journalist
- Known for: Reporting on Mahsa Amini's funeral and her subsequent arrest
- Awards: World Association of Newspapers' Golden Pen of Freedom Award, UNESCO/Guillermo Cano World Press Freedom Prize, Leuchtturm Prize, John Aubuchon Press Freedom Award, Courage in Journalism Award, International Women's Media Foundation awards

Elaheh Mohammadi (Persian: الهه محمدی; born 9 May 1987) is an Iranian journalist who reports on society and women's issues for the daily Ham-Mihan newspaper. She has also worked with state-controlled media outlets such as Shahrvand, Khabar Online and Etemad Online in the past years. Time magazine named her one of the 100 most influential people in the world in 2023. In 2026, she was awarded a Courage in Journalism Award by the International Women’s Media Foundation.

Mohammadi was arrested by Iranian security forces in September 2022 for reporting on Mahsa Amini's funeral.

== Report on Mahsa Amini's funeral and arrest ==
Mohammadi had traveled to Saqqez for Iran's Ham-Mihan newspaper to cover the funeral of Mahsa Amini, 22, who had spent three days in a coma following her arrest by Tehran's notorious morality police and died on 16 September. Mohammadi had reported about the police attack at the funeral.

Mohammadi was summoned by the judicial authorities but was then arrested by security forces on 29 September 2022, while on her way to the Ministry of Intelligence office for the questioning, according to Mohammad Ali Kamfiroozi, Mohammadi's lawyer, who broke the news on his page on social media.

On 4 November 2022, the Islamic Revolutionary Guards and Intelligence ministry issued a joint statement, filled with unsubstantiated claims, accusing Mohammadi and Niloofar Hamedi, another female journalist, of being foreign agents engaged in “multi-dimensional wars” organized by “Western and Zionist intelligence agencies… to carry out serious and uninterrupted planning with the aim of influencing different social layers, especially in areas related to women”.

Her sister Elnaz Mohammadi has been sentenced to three years in prison in September 2023.

=== Legal proceedings and exoneration ===
On 11 August 2024, Mohammadi's lawyers announced that the journalist had been acquitted by the Court of Appeal of the charge of "collaborating with a hostile foreign government, the United States." Regarding the remaining charges, she was legally covered by the 2021 amnesty decree. On 11 February 2025, it was reported that Mohammadi had been pardoned by Iran's top judicial authority alongside Niloofar Hamedi on the anniversary of the 1979 Islamic Revolution with Supreme Leader Ayatollah Ali Khamenei’s approval. The pardons cleared remaining charges of "colluding against national security" and "propaganda against the regime," closing their cases. Both women had been temporarily released on bail in January 2024 after 17 months in prison while awaiting appeal and were later acquitted of the charge of "collaboration with the U.S." by an appeals court. She was summoned for questioning on February 25 but released after several hours.

== Awards and recognition ==
- International Press Freedom Award by Canadian Journalists for Free Expression (CJFE), shared with Niloofar Hamedi, February 2023
- 2023 Harvard's Louis M. Lyons Award for Conscience and Integrity in Journalism, shared with Niloofar Hamedi, March 2023
- In March 2023 the Turin city council granted honorary citizenship to Iranian journalist Elahe Mohammadi.
- 2023 UNESCO/Guillermo Cano World Press Freedom Prize, Shared with Niloofar Hamedi and Narges Mohammadi.
- In April 2023, Mohammadi and Niloofar Hamedi were included in Time magazine's list of 100 Most Influential People in the World.
- June 2023, Golden Pen award from WAN-IFRA, shared with Niloofar Hamedi.
- 2026, Courage in Journalism Award from the International Women’s Media Foundation.

== See also ==
- Compulsory Hijab in Iran
- Human rights in Iran
- Mahsa Amini protests
- Nazila Maroufian
