= Habib Afkari =

Brother of Navid Afkari and former political prisoner (born 1991)

- Born: Habib Afkari Sangari حبیب افکاری سنگری; 3 December 1991 (age 34); Shiraz, Fars province, Iran
- Family: Navid Afkari (brother)

Habib Afkari Sangari (Persian: حبیب افکاری سنگری; born 3 December 1991) is a political dissident who was imprisoned in November 2018 for participating in August 2018 protests in Shiraz.

== Arrest and torture ==
Habib was arrested in November 2018, three months after his brothers Vahid and Navid, because of his involvement in August 2018 protests. All three brothers were heavily tortured in order to confess, which the Afkari's publicized through audiotapes and letters where they called for help and denied the charges.

In the last available reports, the forensics doctors recorded 15 injuries on Habib Afkari's body.

== Charges and sentences ==
The case investigator's final report cited confessions and security investigations: "The defendants, in this case, have taken various actions to fight the Islamic government. "Writing slogans, attending protests, and attacking security forces." Habib Afkari was sentenced to 7.5 years in prison for "Assembly and collusion against national security," 4.5 years in prison for "disobeying the police orders," and 2.5 years on the charge of "assault with a knife." Additionally, he was sentenced to nine months in prison on the charge of "insulting officers" and one extra year and 74 lashes on for "disturbing public order." Habib Afkari was also sentenced to pay 8% of the total amount of the blood money to the plaintiffs. According to Article 134, his applicable sentence follows as: Seven years and six months of imprisonment and payment of about 8% of the blood money.

== Solitary confinement and release ==
Immediately after Navid Afkari's execution on September 12, 2020, Vahid and Habib Afkari were moved to solitary confinement. In May 2021, Pouran Nazemi was arrested while protesting Afkari's imprisonment outside the prison. Habib was released on March 5, 2022, while Vahid remains in solitary confinement in Adel-Abaad Prison.
