= Niloofar Hamedi =

Iranian journalist

- نیلوفر حامدی
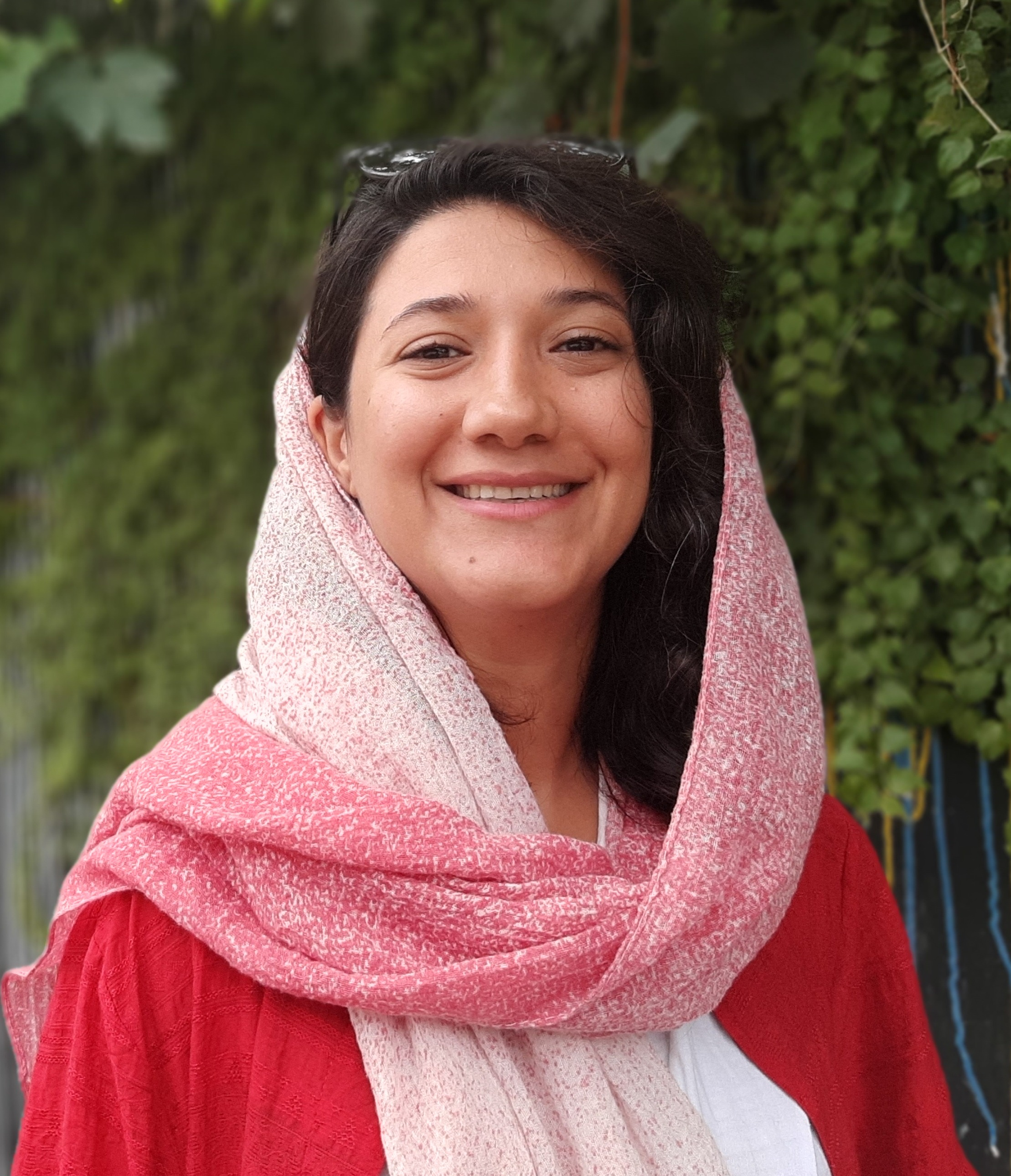
- Born: 22 October 1992 (age 33)
- Occupation: Journalism
- Known for: Reporting Mahsa Amini's death
- Awards: UNESCO/Guillermo Cano World Press Freedom Prize, World Association of Newspapers' Golden Pen of Freedom Award, Leuchtturm Prize, John Aubuchon Press Freedom Award

Niloofar Hamedi (Persian: نیلوفر حامدی; born 22 October 1992) is an Iranian journalist who works for the reformist daily newspaper Shargh. She was arrested during the Mahsa Amini protests for breaking the news about Mahsa Amini and reporting on her treatment by Iran's Morality Police. Hamedi is also known for her work as one of the first journalists to have interviewed the family and lawyer for imprisoned writer Sepideh Rashnu, and she published an investigative report on her case. Time magazine named her one of the 100 most influential people in the world in 2023.

== Report on Mahsa Amini and arrest ==
On 16 September 2022, Hamedi gained access to Kasra Hospital in Tehran, where 22-year-old Mahsa Amini was being treated following her detention by the morality police for allegedly wearing her compulsory hijab inappropriately. Later that day, and around the time of Amini's death, Hamedi tweeted a photo of Amini's parents hugging and crying in the hospital. That picture quickly spread along with Hamedi's reporting on Amini's death, and eventually spiraled into nationwide protests.

As a result of her news coverage, Hamedi was arrested by security forces on 21 September, following a wave of arrests that targeted journalists and students. Hamedi's Twitter account, where she had originally posted the influential photo of Amini's parents, was suspended without explanation. Her charges include colluding with the intention of acting against national security and propaganda against the state.

According to Hamedi's lawyer, Mohammad Ali Kamfirouzi, she has been interrogated and is being held in solitary confinement at Tehran's Evin Prison. On 4 November 2022, the Islamic Revolutionary Guards and Intelligence ministry issued a joint statement, filled with unsubstantiated claims, accusing Hamedi and Elaheh Mohammadi, another female journalist who had reported on Amini's funeral, of being foreign agents engaged in “multi-dimensional wars” organized by “Western and Zionist intelligence agencies… to carry out serious and uninterrupted planning with the aim of influencing different social layers, especially in areas related to women”. The statement incorrectly claimed that Niloofar Hamedi, 30, had published a photo of Mahsa Amini in a hospital bed that went viral on social media. Yet Hamedi, who works for the Shargh newspaper in Tehran, never tweeted a photo of Amini in a hospital bed; she had only tweeted a photo of Mahsa’s parents (father and grandmother according to some reports) embracing in the hospital after her death.

=== Exoneration ===
On 11 February 2025, it was reported that Hamedi had been pardoned by Iran's top judicial authority alongside Elaheh Mohammadi on the anniversary of the 1979 Islamic Revolution with Supreme Leader Ayatollah Ali Khamenei’s approval. The pardons cleared remaining charges of "colluding against national security" and "propaganda against the regime," closing their cases. Both women had been temporarily released on bail in January 2024 after 17 months in prison while awaiting appeal and were later acquitted of the charge of "collaboration with the U.S." by an appeals court.

== Recognition ==
=== Awards ===
- International Press Freedom Award by Canadian Journalists for Free Expression (CJFE), shared with Elaheh Mohammadi, February 2023
- 2023 Harvard's Louis M. Lyons Award for Conscience and Integrity in Journalism, shared with Elaheh Mohammadi, March 2023
- 2023 UNESCO/Guillermo Cano World Press Freedom Prize, Shared with Elaheh Mohammadi and Narges Mohammadi.
- 2023 Golden Pen for freedom by WAN-IFRA, shared with Elahe Mohammadi.

=== Other recognitions ===
- Hamedi's photo of Mahsa Amini's father and grandmother embracing each other right after her death was selected the Photo of Year (for year 1401) by a group of renowned Iranian Afghan photojournalists, March 2023
- In April 2023, Hamedi and Elaheh Mohammadi were included in Time magazine's list of 100 Most Influential People in the World.

== See also ==
- Compulsory Hijab in Iran
- Iranian protests against compulsory hijab
- Human rights in Iran
- Reactions to the Mahsa Amini protests
- Nazila Maroufian
