= Shahrvand =

Persian language newspaper

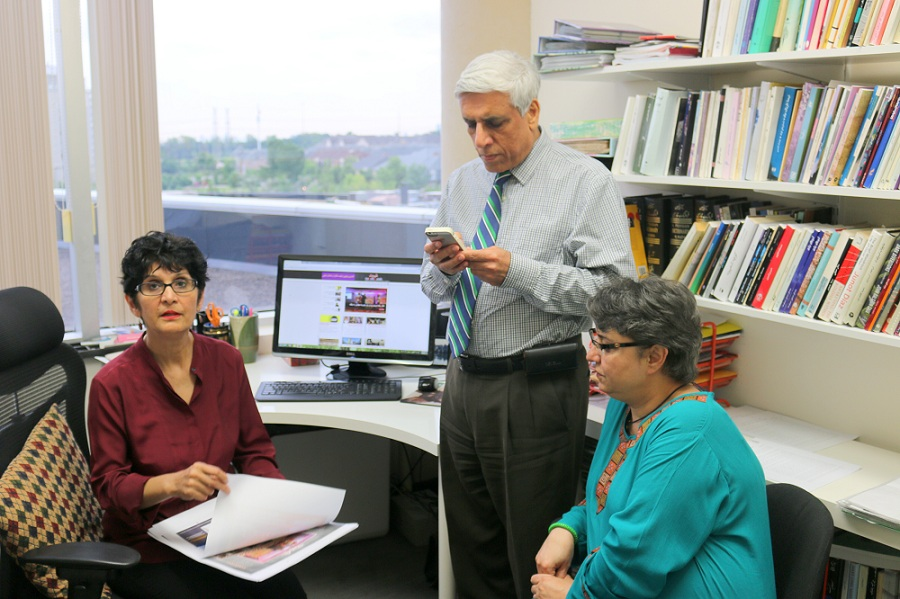
Shahrvand Editorial Team in their office in Toronto, June 2014

Shahrvand (Persian: شهروند) is the largest Persian language newspaper in North America, which serves the Iranian and Afghan communities across North America.

Shahrvand has been published since 1991. Shahrvand is published weekly on Thursdays with distribution through Iranian businesses as well as community arts/cultural/entertainment events. Shahrvand has introduced weekly arts and cultural listings provided in partnership with Toronto’s NOW magazine. .

== Features ==
Shahrvand regularly features:

- Current affairs
- Business news
- Sports
- Science and Technology news
- Entertainment
- Literature
- Crossword Puzzles

== Distribution ==
Distributed free of charge to the community in the following areas:

- Ontario: Greater Toronto Area, Ottawa, London, Hamilton and Windsor
- Quebec: Montreal
- Alberta: Edmonton and Calgary
- United States: Houston, Dallas, Seattle, Los Angeles, San Francisco and San Diego

== Demographic information ==
There are over 450,000 Persian speakers populating Canada; roughly 150,000 live in Southern Ontario, particularly in the GTA (Greater Toronto Area).

== Circulation ==
With a weekly circulation of 14,000 in Toronto and an estimated readership of 110,000 Shahrvand provides an editorial platform. Shahrvand Publications is headquartered in Toronto, Ontario; and has affiliate offices across Canada, the United States, and Germany. Shahrvand has a network of journalists and contributing editors in the Middle East, Europe and North America.

== English edition ==
A summary of the Persian language Thursday edition of Shahrvand is published in English on the website and is targeted to second generation Canadians of Iranian descent, as well as those who display an interest in Iranian culture.
