= Cyberspace service regulation system =

Cyberspace service regulation system act (طرح نظام تنظیم مقررات خدمات فضای مجازی or طرح صیانت از فضای مجازی; Cyberspace protection bill; lit. security plan) is a cyberlaw put in place in 2022 in Iran. It puts the responsibility of controlling internet exchange points on the Iranian Armed Forces.

== Bill ==
=== Data ===
Corporations are required by law to safeguard Iranian users' private data; though it also requires National Information Network's "sanitation", prevention, countering and detection of cyber crime and obeying courts and Iranian judicial system orders'.

== Effect of the bill ==
Radio Farda reported that Instagram (at the time unblocked in Iran) may be affected by the act.
