= Execution of Navid Afkari =

Iranian wrestler (1994–2020)

Navid Afkari

Personal information
- Native name: نوید افکاری سنگری
- Born: Navid Afkari Sangari; 22 July 1993 Shiraz, Iran
- Died: 12 September 2020 (aged 27) Adel-Abaad prison, Shiraz, Iran
- Resting place: Sangar, Sepidan County
- Occupation: Wrestler
- Years active: 2002–2015
- Criminal charges: Alleged murder of security agent, organizing a group, participating in protests
- Criminal penalty: Death
- Criminal status: Executed
- Family: Habib, Saeid, Vahid (brothers), Elham (sister)

Navid Afkari Sangari (Persian: نوید افکاری سنگری; 22 July 1993 – 12 September 2020) was an Iranian wrestler who was sentenced to death and executed in Shiraz after being accused and convicted of murdering a security guard during the 2018 Iranian protests; sources from outside Iran also cited convictions on other charges related to Afkari's participation in the protests, while Iranian sources denied that the case had any connection to the protests. Afkari had filed a complaint with the Iranian judiciary, and stated in an audiotape recording that was smuggled from his prison, that his initial confession had been forced due to torture; the Iranian judiciary denied the torture claims, and the Iranian state media broadcast a recording of the confession. There were worldwide calls for Afkari to be pardoned, including by International Olympic Committee President Thomas Bach, and by then U.S. president Donald Trump. Afkari's brothers, Vahid and Habib were sentenced to 54 and 27 years, respectively, in prison in the same case.

In September 2020, the United States blacklisted several Iranian officials and entities over alleged gross violations of human rights that also included Navid Afkari's execution.

== Wrestling career ==
Navid Afkari had been a wrestler, having discovered the sport at the age of nine, and had participated in several national Iranian wrestling events. In 2008 he was ranked 2nd in the 69 kg category in youth Greco-Roman wrestling. In 2016, he ranked 8th place nationally in the 71 kg category for Greco-Roman wrestling.

== Arrest and charges ==
Afkari was arrested on 17 September, 2018 for the murder of Hasan Turkman, who worked as a security guard for Water and Sewage company of Shiraz,

Turkman was murdered on the night of 1 August 2018 (on 2 August 2018 according to the official version) while returning home from work. According to the Iranian Criminal Investigation Police, Afkari was arrested after he was identified in CCTV footage from a place near the murder scene. Afkari had been identified by police via the footage that was later reported to be the version of events prevailing inside of Iran.

In audio clips released (or according to another source, leaked) from the court, Afkari stated that he had not played a role in the murder of Turkman. According to Afkari's lawyer Ali Younesi, there was no evidence linking him to that case. In an interview with "Emtedad" news network that was published by Deutsche Welle, Younesi claimed the sentencing court had been influenced by two sources that they claim showed Afkari as the murderer. According to Younesi, the court used CCTV footage of a street near where Turkman was found dead, but showed the scene before Turkman's death. Footage from the moment when the felony took place was claimed to not exist.

The video was reported to show Afkari walking on the sidewalk while talking on the phone. According to audio recordings from the court, Afkari had requested that the video be presented to the court, which head judge, Mehrdad Tahmtan refused. In addition to the CCTV footage, the court used eye-witness accounts as the other evidence for linking Afkari with Turkman's murder case. The accounts were later dropped by the people that initially testified against Afkari. One testified under pressure, another said that their testimony was not right or accurate and another one mentioned that they had met Afkari for the first time during the court.

For his involvement in the protests, and further the alleged murder case, the court led by the head judge, Mehrdad Tahmtan, sentenced Afkari with two capital punishments. After his sentencing, Afkari found this ruling unjust, and he voiced his concerns. In one of his voice calls from the Adel-Abaad prison, he said:

My audience are noble people that have a bit of honor in them. Your complacency means rooting for oppression and the oppressor. It means supporting the execution of an innocent man, which means I will be getting closer, step-by-step, to the hanging platform.

He insisted his innocence stating:

People! It is only logical that I will fight for my life; and as per the evidence, all clues are an affirmation to my innocence. All the evidence that we have collected and everything that I am saying right now, is only here to let you know that if I ever get executed, in the 21st century and with all the human right organizations, the UN or security council or the whatever else, an innocent human being, which had tried to the best of his might and fought, to have his voice heard, was hanged.

He warned people about the systemic corruption infesting the judiciary system of Iran and how innocent lives get taken by their unjust rulings, stating:

Know and be aware that if the innocent me gets executed, this won't be the first victim of the unfairness of this so-called 'justice-oriented' unjust court".

== Forced confessions ==
While Afkari initially issued a confession accepting the murder charge, he would later take it back stating he had been tortured into making a false confession. As per the audio recordings released by the court, Afkari's request to summon the witness who testified about his torture was ignored by the judge.

During the hearings in the privately held court, Afkari stated:

I told the inspector that neither do I know the secret agent (that has been killed), nor have I heard his name! But under torture, and to save my family, and for Vahid (one of his imprisoned brothers), I gave them what they wanted.

His parents sent a letter to the chief justice of Iran claiming their son endured torture.

In one of his last recordings from prison, Afkari said:

Once I had been freed from the pressure of solitary confinement, the basement, and the tortures, once I stepped back onto the prison, I immediately wrote to the judicial offices and filed my complaint (against their use of torture) and screamed (my innocence); that I am not a murderer. I requested them to take me to the forensics bureau (for medical examinations of his scars). Per their report and eye-witness account (of my torture) and other evidence, it was made clear that I had been tortured. No matter the countless times I wrote (and pleaded) that all my confessions were obtained under (pressure and) torture; or how there is not a single shred of evidence in this damned case that could prove my guilt, but they did not want to hear our voice. I figured they were looking for a neck for their noose.

== Death sentence ==
Afkari was given two death sentences for his charges. According to human rights activists in Iran, his brothers Vahid and Habib were sentenced to 54 and 27 years in prison for charges stemming from the same case, as well as 74 lashes each. In a tweet from 1 May 2021, journalist and activist Masih Alinejad said that Vahid was subjected to pressure to make forced confessions under the threat of execution.

=== Reactions ===
Afkari's death sentence sparked global outrage and calls to overturn his execution. U.S. President Donald Trump, International Olympic Committee President Thomas Bach and Ultimate Fighting Championship President Dana White all petitioned Iran not to execute Afkari. Trump tweeted on 4 September 2020:

Hearing that Iran is looking to execute a great and popular wrestling star, 27-year-old Navid Afkarai [sic], whose sole act was an anti-government demonstration on the streets. They were protesting the “country’s worsening economic situation and inflation”. To the leaders of Iran, I would greatly appreciate if you would spare this young man’s life, and not execute him. Thank you!

U.S. State Department spokeswoman, Morgan Ortagus, tweeted: "We join the world in outrage at the Iranian regime's death sentence for Navid Afkari, who was tortured into giving a false confession after participating in peaceful protests in 2018. The regime also tortured his two brothers and sentenced them to decades in prison. Let them go!"

The World Players Association urged for the Iranian judiciary to issue a stay of execution.

Iran's state-sponsored Tasnim News Agency dismissed Trump's tweet in a feature story, saying that US sanctions had hurt Iranian hospitals amid the pandemic, "Trump is worried about the life of a murderer while he puts many Iranian patients' lives in danger by imposing severe sanctions," the agency said.

=== Potential banning of Iran from the Olympics ===
There have been talks about whether Iran should be banned from the Olympic Games. Australian sports administrator Brendan Schwab, executive director of the Switzerland-based World Players Association, which represents tens of thousands of professional athletes around the world, said that:

We can't think of a more grievous attack on the humanitarian values of the Olympic movement than the horrific execution of an athlete through a coerced confession obtained through torture.

Schwab stated that Afkari's execution "must result in Iran forfeiting its right to be a part of sport's universal community".

== Death and burial ==
On 12 September 2020, it was announced that Afkari had been executed. His body was buried at night-time with high-security presence; only Afkari's immediate family members attended.

Afkari's supporters raised several points of doubt regarding the official version of the execution. Afkari was supposedly executed in the month of Muharram, during which the executions are not supposed to take place from the legal provisions, as it is considered forbidden (haram) to kill during that month by sharia law, also written in the Constitution of the Islamic Republic of Iran.

There were also reports that the family of Turkman was about to agree to drop their call for qisas (retribution). They were to have a meeting to discuss the matter with the other side the day Afkari was announced dead. His brother received the news of Afkari's death through a call shortly before his plane was due to depart for Shiraz in order to go and visit the Turkmans.

Afkari's lawyer Younesi said that his client had been denied a last meeting with family before execution, in violation of Iranian law. There were also claims that the legally required notification of family about execution, one or two day in advance, had not been made. In the last voice call from Afkari made hours before his death, he still appeared to have been completely unaware of his impending execution.

Allegations were made by witnesses that Afkari had been tortured prior to execution. There were signs of blunt trauma on Afkari's body, his face was deformed and he had a broken nose. The family members were only allowed to see Afkari's face and they were forbidden from seeing his body. The cloth with which his body had been carried to the burial was stained with blood from the inside. These accounts led to suspicions that the official version of Afkari's execution had been intended to forestall public anger.

Members of the Iranian diaspora held protest vigils in cities worldwide, including Toronto, Winnipeg, Edmonton, Frankfurt, Paris, Berlin, London, Gothenburg, The Hague, Bern, Brussels, Copenhagen, Rome, Malmö, Hamburg and Washington.

== Sister's arrest ==
Elham Afkari, Navid's sister, was arrested on November 10, 2022 amidst the nationwide protests in Iran following the Death of Mahsa Amini. Iranian officials have charged her with being an agent of Iran International, the opposition television broadcaster which was recently called a “terrorist” organization by the Iranian intelligence minister. She is in the custody of Iran's Ministry of Intelligence.

== In popular culture ==
Afkari and his death was the inspiration for the song titled Navid Azadi (lit. beacon of freedom) by Iranian artist King Raam. The 2021 art project PaykanArtCar was inspired by Afkari, as was Amir Zargara's 2024 short film A Good Day Will Come.

A campaign in the name of "United For Navid" was founded by Iranian journalist and women’s rights activist Masih Alinejad to draw attention to Iran's Islamic republic regime’s abuse of Iranian athletes' human rights.

== See also ==
- Human rights in Iran
- Human rights in the Islamic Republic of Iran
- High Council for Human Rights
- Judicial system of Iran
- #StopExecutionsinIran
- Ruhollah Zam
- Majid Jamali Fashi
