= Reactions to the Mahsa Amini protests =

Reactions to Iranian protest movement since September 2022

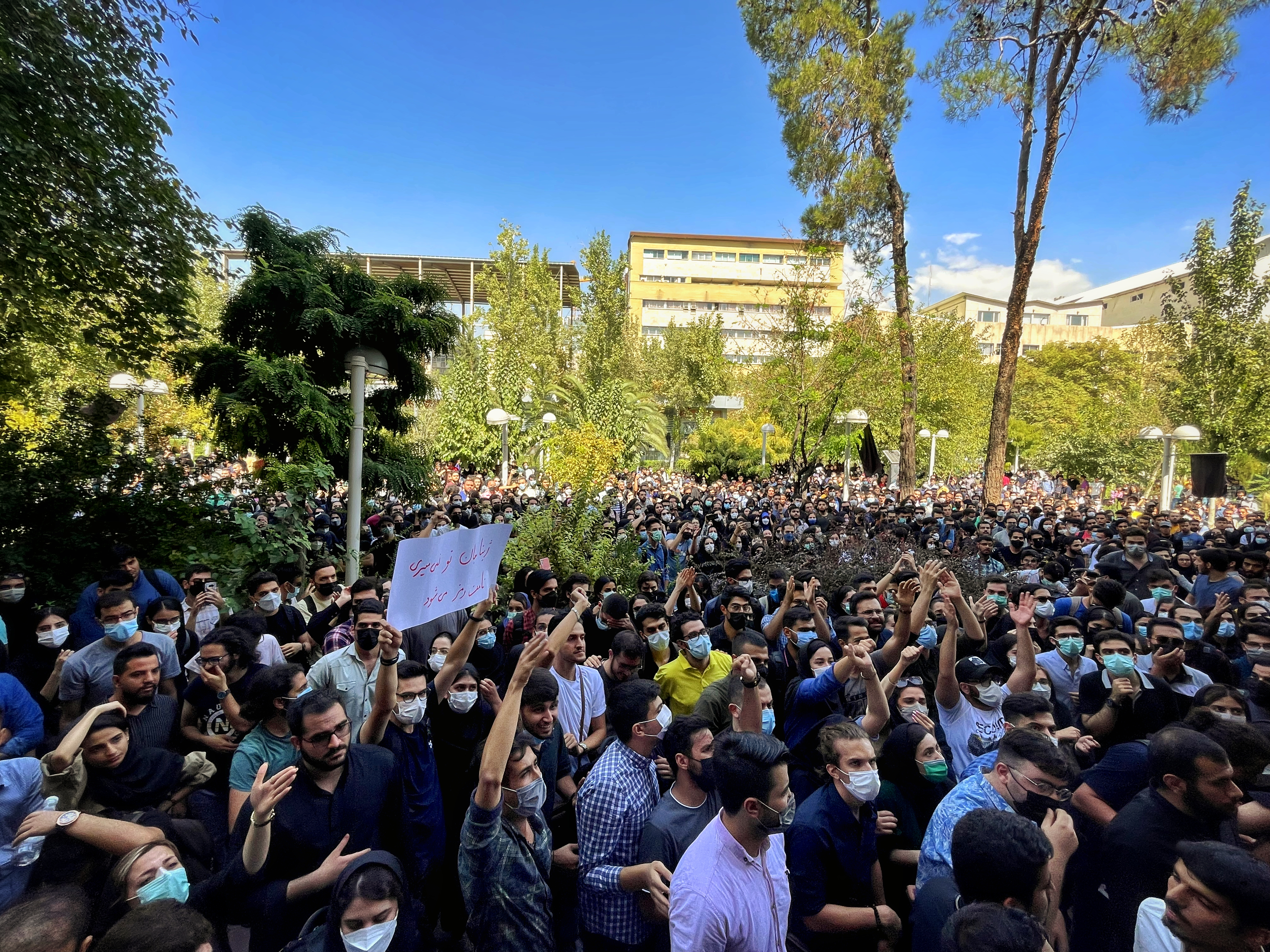
Students at Amir Kabir University protesting in the Iranian capital Tehran on 20 September 2022.

Large scale protests broke out following the death of Mahsa Amini while she was under arrest by the Guidance Patrol of the government of the Islamic Republic of Iran. Reactions to her death and the following crackdown on protestors by law enforcement are both domestic and international.

== Incumbent Iranian politicians ==
- Ali Khamenei, head of government 1980-1988 and head of state since, said on 25 November 2022, "They have sacrificed their lives to protect people from rioters ... the presence of Basij shows that the Islamic Revolution is alive." In April 2023, he further said that "rejecting hijab was religiously and politically forbidden" and that women who do this open up to foreign intelligence.
- Masoud Pezeshkian, (member of the Islamic Consultative Assembly, 2008–present), in a video interview on IRINN TV translated by MEMRI said, "After 40 years of this society...They have been raised by us, not by the Americans. We have had control of the broadcasting authority, the mosques, the schools, the universities. We have been everywhere. It is our fault. We want to implement religious faith through the use of force. This is scientifically impossible."
- In response to the protests in December 2022, Ebrahim Raisi said, "The constitution guarantees the (existence) of the Islamic system", adding that it also "guarantees fundamental rights and legitimate freedoms."
- Abbas Ka'bi and Mohsen Araki of the Society of Seminary Teachers of Qom (Jame’e Moddaresin-e Howzeh Elmiye-ye Qom) called for the death, amputation, crucifixation and exile of the anti-hijab protestors.

== Sunnis in Iran ==
- Molavi Abdolhamid Ismaeelzahi blamed Ali Khamenei. Abdulhamid called for an immediate referendum to "change policies based on the wishes of the people."

== Diaspora reactions ==
- Reza Pahlavi, the son of the final Shah who was ousted in 1979 Iranian revolution, called for additional international pressure on the Iranian leadership, such as the expulsion of diplomats, the freezing of assets, and the creation of a strike fund to compensate workers. He stated: "Women may decide to wear or not wear the veil. But it ought to be a choice, a free choice, not imposed for ideological or religious reasons." His mother, former Empress Farah called for the overthrow of the Iranian government and said that it was the "first time [she] saw a movement on such a scale in Iran".
- Iranian former footballer Ali Karimi expressed his support for the protestors, and called on the Iranian army to side with them. He also shared technical advice on how to circumvent the Internet blackout. Fars News, partially affiliated with the IRGC, called him "the new leader of the opposition", and called for his arrest. Other prominent sportsman who spoke in favor of the protesters included fencer Mojtaba Abedini, and footballers Hossein Mahini (arrested), Alireza Jahanbakhsh, Ali Daei, and Mehdi Mahdavikia.
- Prominent exiled activist Masih Alinejad tweeted, "Police used tear gas to disperse Iranian protesters in Paris in an effort to protect the Islamic Republic embassy. Meanwhile, @EmmanuelMacron shook hands with the murderous president of Iran."
- Author Marjane Satrapi, whose graphic novel Persepolis depicted her life during the 1979 Iranian revolution, described the protests as "beautiful and inspiring". Stating "What I have lived, the youth is living now" and that "there is nothing more beautiful and inspiring than their courage."
- Maryam Rajavi, co-leader of the People's Mojahedin Organization of Iran (MEK) together with Massoud Rajavi, applauded the protesters for their "courage" and said that the people of Iran – especially the women – will "sweep away Khamenei's dark rule" and urged the international community to support protesters.
- The Tudeh Party of Iran made statements condemning the murder of Mahsa Amini and supported protests in Iran and all progressive forces against the Islamic Republic.

== International reactions ==
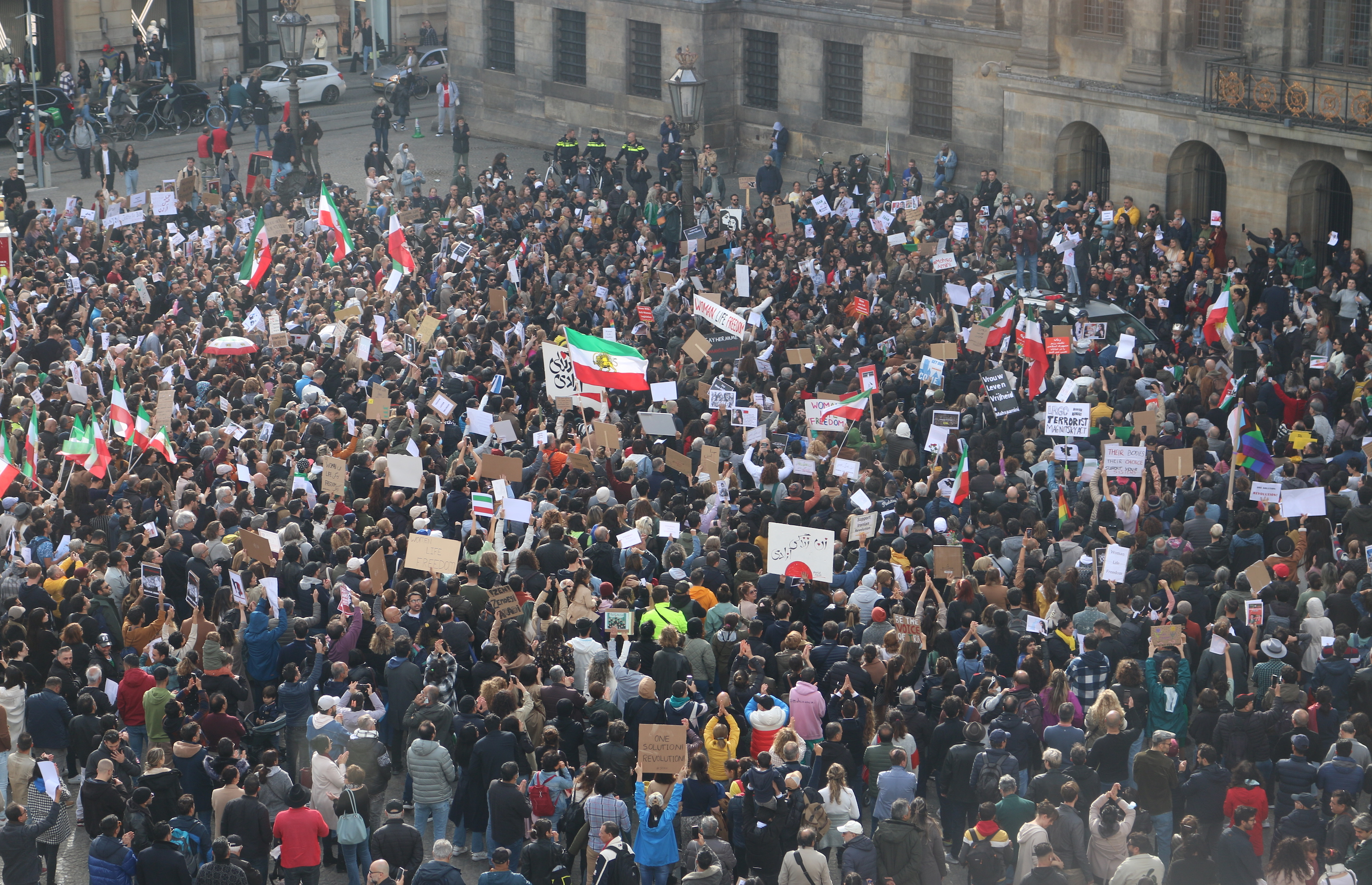
Solidarity protest in Amsterdam

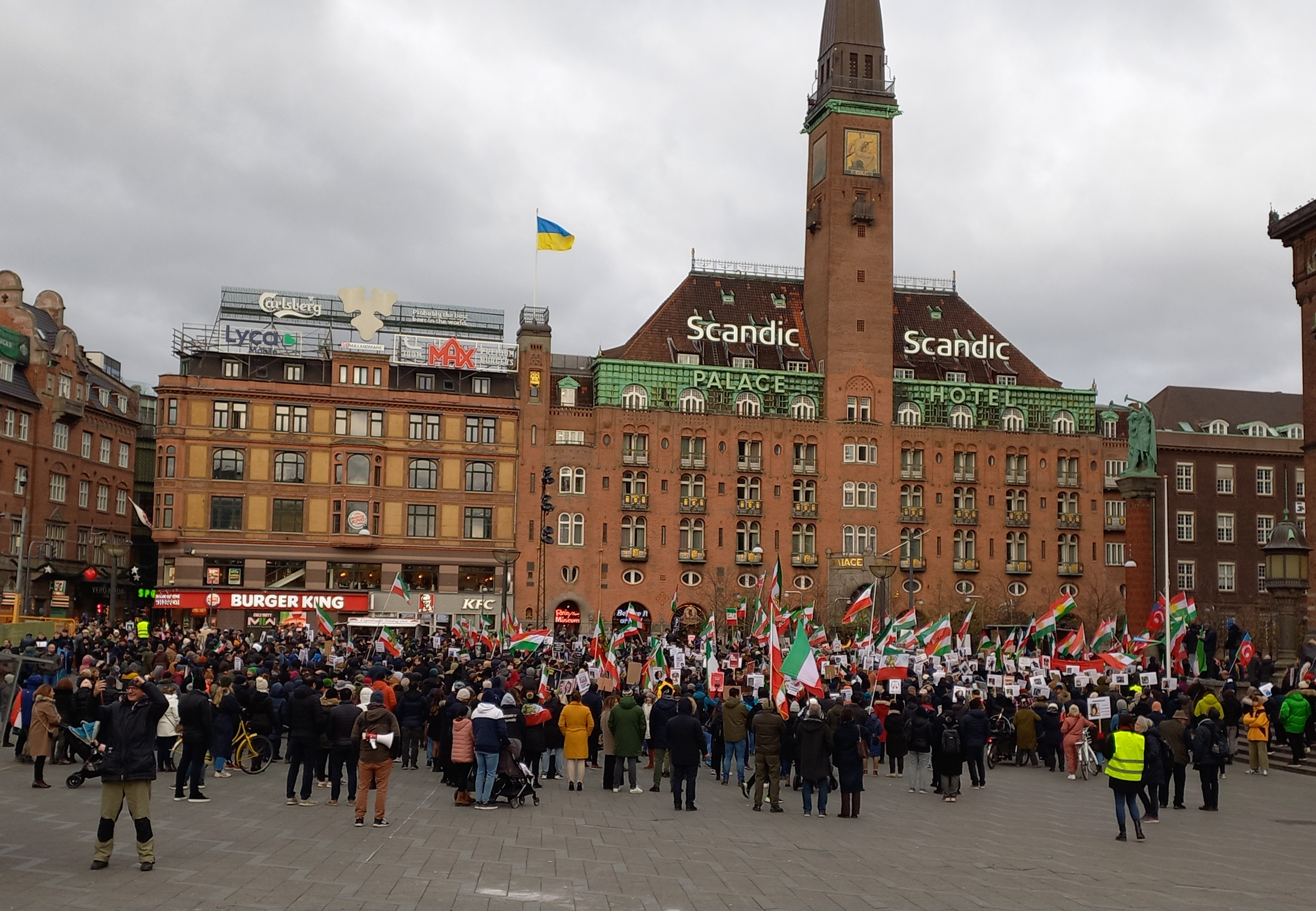
Solidarity protest in the Copenhagen town square

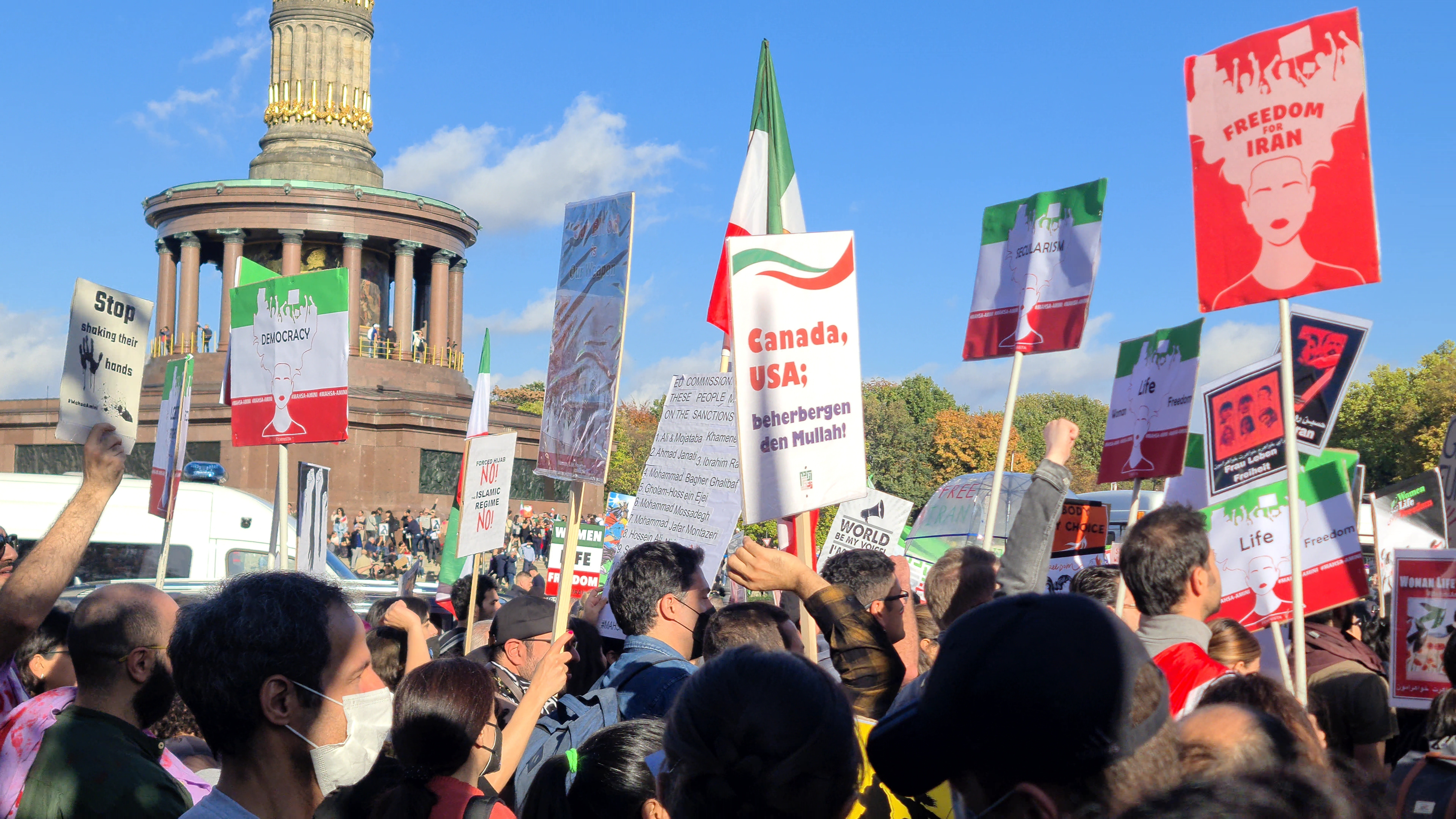
Solidarity protest in Berlin

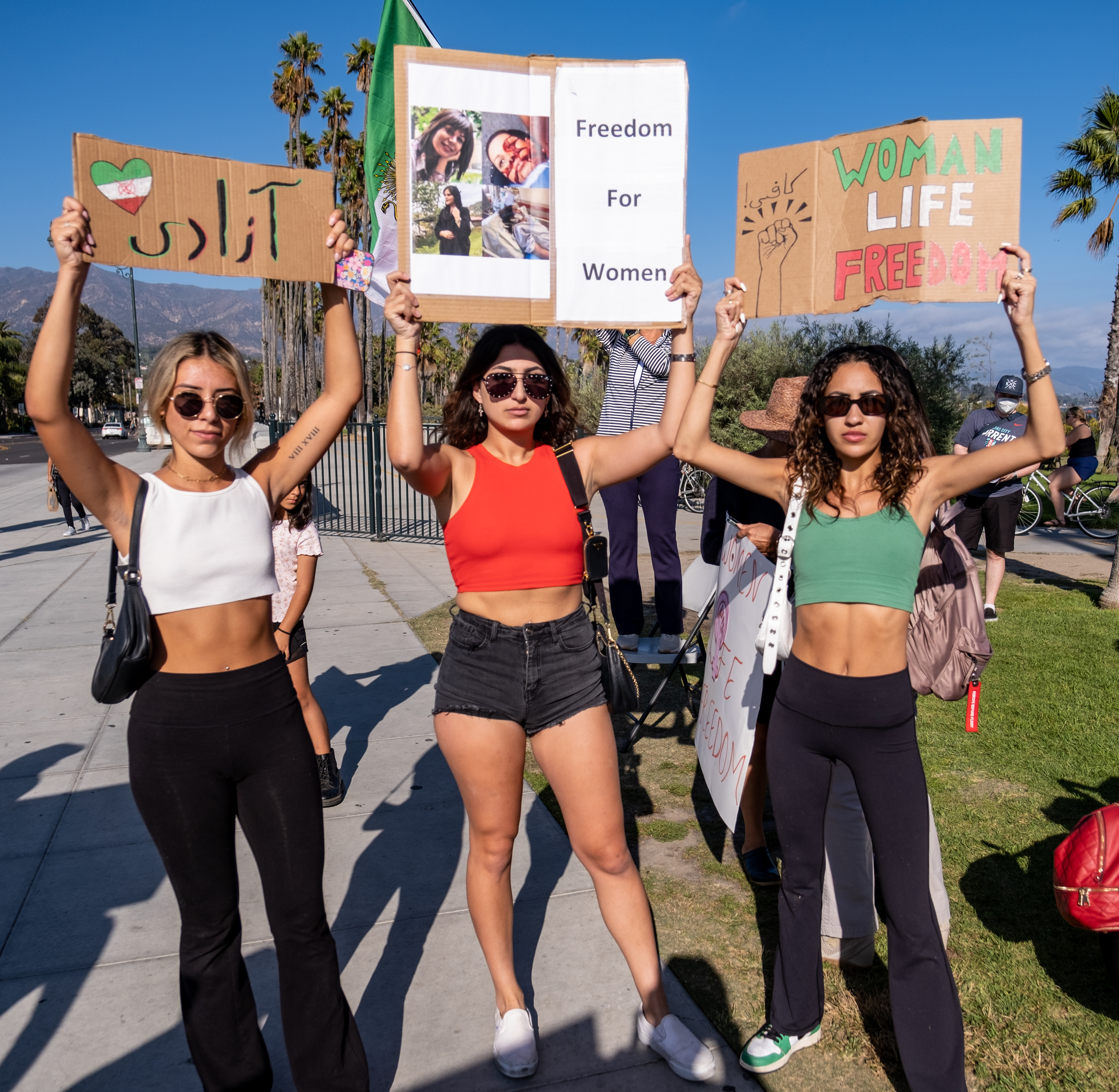
Solidarity protest in Santa Barbara

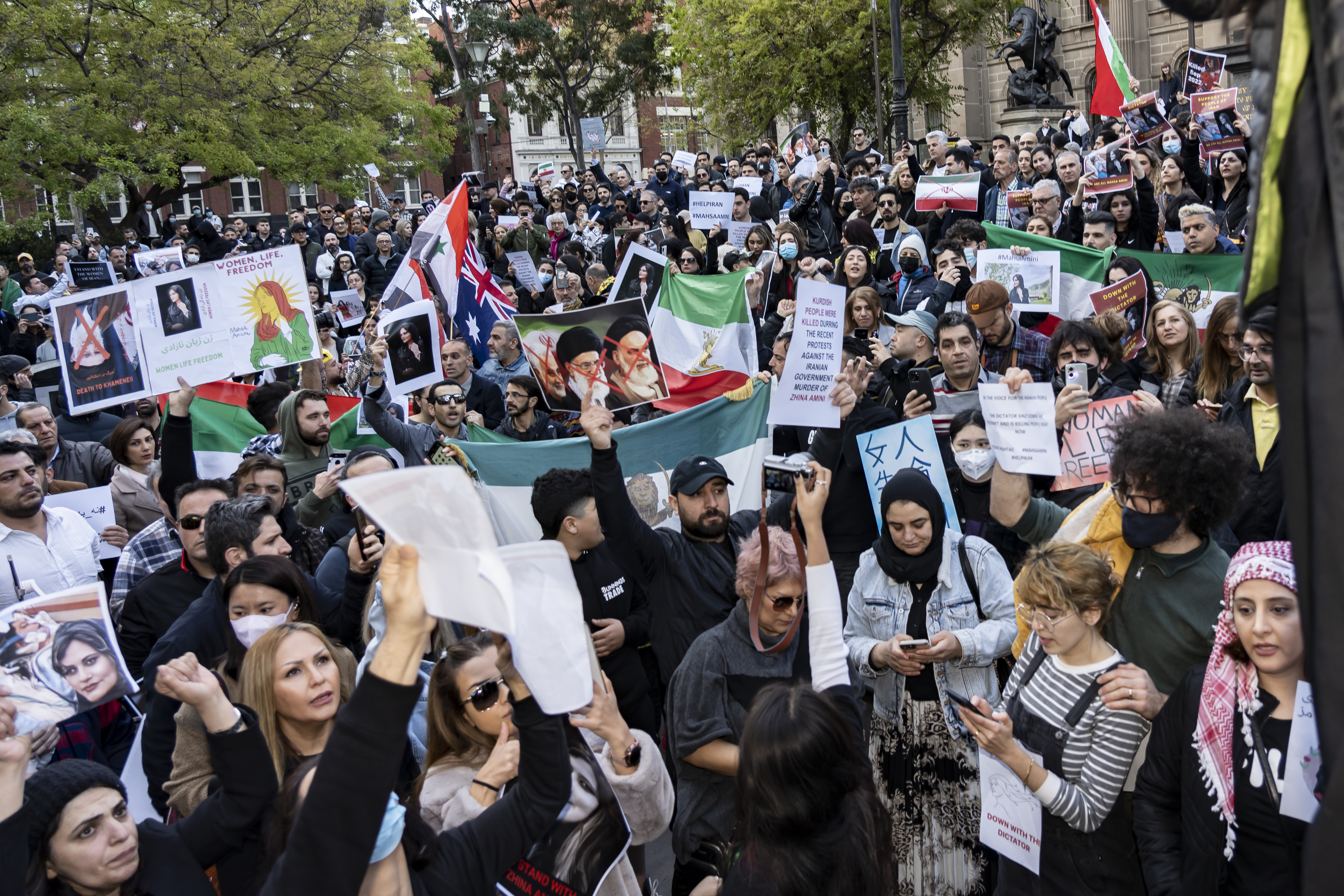
Solidarity protest in Melbourne

California State Capitol lit with Iranian flag to support Mahsa Amini protests

According to the BBC, as of November 2022, Western grassroots public opinion is strongly on the side of the protestors. For Western governments, the protests compete for priority with other issues such as Iranian nuclearization and Iranian arms shipments to Russia. Many international NGOs have explicitly condemned Iran's government for the violent crackdown, but the United Nations has declined to follow suit, instead limiting itself to statements of concern. As of November 2022, most Gulf states (including Saudi Arabia) have remained quiet, refraining from official statement.

=== Countries ===
- Argentina: The Chamber of Deputies unanimously approved a resolution expressing support to Iranian women against "oppression, human rights violations and the grave repression implemented." At the United Nations, Argentina voted in favour of expelling Iran from the United Nations Commission on the Status of Women in a US-led initiative.
- Australia: Foreign Minister Penny Wong condemned the Iranian crackdowns, stating "We continue to support the people of Iran and their right to freedom of expression and equality for women and girls."
- Austria: The foreign ministry condemned the Iranian government's "disproportionate use of force" and stated that "Peaceful protests, started by courageous Iranian women, and freedom of expression must be respected at all times." Austria further supported European Union sanctions against Iranian officials responsible.
- Belgium: Foreign Minister Hadja Lahbib, along with fellow politicians Darya Safai and Goedele Liekens, cut her own hair during a live debate in support of Iranian protestors, and stated that "women can exercise their right to protest, but the reaction of security forces is disproportionate."
- Bolivia: Bolivian ambassador to Iran Romina Pérez condemned the protesters as "recent riots [in Iran] perpetrated by British and American Zionists". Pérez added that "we are sure that all problems will be solved with the solidarity, knowledge and understanding of the dear leader of Iran".
- Bosnia and Herzegovina: Ambassador to the United Nations Sven Alkalaj abstained from voting on the resolution which condemns the status of human rights in Iran on 16 November 2022. On 6 December 2022, Foreign Minister Bisera Turković met with Iran's Foreign Minister and stated that "Iran is our partner and a friend, and the only country that unequivocally supports the territorial integrity and independence of Bosnia and Herzegovina. They supported us in the time of defence and construction of Bosnia and Herzegovina, for which we remain thankful." She added that "little is told about the rights in Afghanistan and Palestine and in the end about human rights in our country". Turković criticised stereotypes in the media and said in the end "imagine me talking to you vailed like this, what would be your perception, stereotype? Human rights include a right of clothes, that everyone should wear what they want and be equally treated".
- Canada: Foreign Minister Mélanie Joly called for "a full and complete investigation into the regime's actions" in the aftermath of Amini's death. On 29 October 2022, Prime Minister Justin Trudeau marched with protesters in Ottawa where Trudeau expressed his support for the protests and for Iranian women, while also announcing a round of sanctions on Iran for "gross and systematic human rights violations".
- Chile: President Gabriel Boric called on the United Nations to "mobilize efforts to stop violence against women whether it be in Iran, in memory of Mahsa Amini, who died at the hands of the police this week, or anywhere in the world" in his speech on 20 September.
- Finland: Foreign Minister Pekka Haavisto stated on 25 September that "People in Iran, as anywhere else, have the right to peaceful protest. This right must be ensured."
- France: Foreign Minister Catherine Colonna summoned the Iranian ambassador in Paris to condemn the Iranian government's actions, which include the arrests of 4 French citizens in Iran and the extraction of forced confessions under duress, and announced France's support for European Union sanctions and freezing of Iranian assets. President Emmanuel Macron also discussed the issue directly with Iranian President Ebrahim Raisi. In November 2022, Macron repeatedly referred to the protests as a "revolution".
- Germany: Foreign Minister Annalena Baerbock said in an interview to Bild am Sonntag on 9 October that "Those who beat up (Iranian) women and girls on the street, who abduct, arbitrarily imprison and condemn to death people who want nothing other than to live free – they stand on the wrong side of history." Baerbock also said that Germany would support the European Union freezing assets of Iranian officials responsible for law enforcement crackdowns.
- Greece: The foreign ministry issued a statement that "We fully align ourselves with the declaration by High Representative/Vice President Josep Borrell on the latest developments in Iran."
- (Vatican City) Holy See: Pope Francis condemned Iran for its use of the death penalty against protesters, saying that "The death penalty cannot be employed for a purported state justice, since it does not constitute a deterrent nor render justice to victims, but only fuels the thirst for vengeance" and called for a worldwide abolishment of capital punishment.
- Israel: Prime Minister Yair Lapid said in his speech to United Nations General Assembly on 22 September that "Young Iranians are suffering and struggling from the shackles of Iran's regime, and the world is silent. They cry for help on social media. They pay for their desire to live a life of freedom — with their lives. Iran's regime hates Jews, hates women, hates gay people, hates the West. They hate and kill Muslims who think differently, like Salman Rushdie and Mahsa Amini."
- Netherlands: Foreign Minister Wopke Hoekstra met with Iranian Foreign Minister Hossein Amir-Abdollahian on 23 September and stated that "Women's rights are human rights and should be respected, as well as the right to peaceful protest." On 6 October, Justice Minister Dilan Yeşilgöz-Zegerius cut her hair during an interview with Op1 to support the Iranian protests.
- New Zealand: Prime Minister Jacinda Ardern stated on 3 October that she was "deeply concerned to see the loss of life and, of course, just generally what we would consider to be human rights issues as they relate to women and girls." The foreign ministry also summoned Iranian ambassador Mohammad Reza Mofatteh to discuss the issue.
- Norway: Foreign Minister Anniken Huitfeldt condemned Iranian law enforcement crackdowns on protestors, but rejected applying unilateral sanctions on Iran.
- Portugal: The foreign ministry stated that "Portugal follows with concern the repression of protests in Iran and mourns all civilian casualties. The right to public protest implies restraint by the authorities. Full, swift accountability of those repressing protests and those responsible for #MahsaAmini's death is vital."
- Saudi Arabia: An intelligence report shared with the United States said "Iran is trying to distract attention from the ongoing protests by poising to carry out attacks on both Saudi Arabia and Iraq".
- Spain: The foreign ministry summoned the Iranian ambassador in Madrid to express "absolute condemnation" for Iran's excessive crackdowns. Second deputy prime minister Yolanda Díaz and Minister of Equality Irene Montero condemned the actions of Iran's government, and called on the UN to investigate Mahsa Amini's death.
- Sweden: Prime Minister Magdalena Andersson on 24 September urged "the Iranian government to refrain from violence against these protesters. Freedom of expression, association and peaceful assembly must be ensured." The next day, Foreign Minister Ann Linde also stated that "Sweden stands firmly behind the women and people of Iran that are peacefully taking to the streets in solidarity with Mahsa Amini."
- Switzerland: The foreign ministry condemned the Iranian government's crackdowns and stated that Switzerland was "dismayed by the high number of victims in relation to the protests in Iran." Flavia Wasserfallen from the Social Democratic Party (SP) cut her hair in support of the demands of the Iranian women.
- Turkey: Presidential Spokesperson İbrahim Kalın said he was saddened by Amini's death and that Iran needs to find a balanced way to respect people's free will and maintain public order. Demonstrations occurred in several Turkish cities, including a protest by a group of Iranians in front of the Iranian Consulate in Istanbul. The two Kurdish imprisoned politicians Selahattin Demirtas and Adnan Mizrakli from the Peoples' Democratic Party (HDP) both cut their hair in support of the protests.
- United Kingdom: Foreign Office Minister Tariq Ahmad on 21 September stated "The death of Mahsa Amini in Iran following her arrest for alleged dress code violations is shocking. We are extremely concerned at reports of serious mistreatment of Ms Amini, and many others, by the security forces."
- United States: During his floor speech to the United Nations General Assembly, President Joe Biden offered solidarity to the protesters, imploring them to "secure their basic rights". Secretary of State Antony Blinken tweeted: "We call on the Iranian government to end its systematic persecution of women and allow peaceful protest". U.S. National Security Adviser Jake Sullivan tweeted that "[Amini's] death is unforgiveable. We will continue to hold Iranian officials accountable for such human rights abuses".

=== International organizations ===
- European Union: The European External Action Service (EEAS) condemned Amini's death in a statement and called for the Iranian government to "ensure that fundamental rights of its citizens are respected". On 4 October, EU foreign policy chief Josep Borrell said the EU was considering sanctions against Iran. By 7 October, Denmark, France, Germany, and Italy had called for EU sanctions against Iran.
- United Nations: UN Secretary-General António Guterres, on 27 September, issued a statement calling on Iranian security forces to "refrain from using unnecessary or disproportionate force". Nada al-Nashif, the acting UN High Commissioner for Human Rights, expressed concern over Amini's death and Iranian authorities' response to the resulting protests. Ravina Shamdasani, the spokesperson for the UN High Commission for Human Rights, urged Iran's clerical leadership several days later to "fully respect the rights to freedom of opinion, expression, peaceful assembly, and association". Shamdasani added that reports specify that "hundreds have also been arrested, including human rights defenders, lawyers, civil society activists, and at least 18 journalists", and "Thousands have joined anti-government demonstrations throughout the country over the past 11 days. Security forces have responded at times with live ammunition".

== List of supporters ==
=== Outside of Iran ===
- Masih Alinejad
- Hamed Esmaeilion
- Farah Pahlavi
- Nazanin Boniadi
- Ali Karimi
- Bahman Ghobadi
- Ali Abbasi
- Shirin Neshat
- Roger Waters
- Donald Trump
- Joe Biden
- Michelle Obama
- Oprah Winfrey
- Angelina Jolie
- Coldplay
- U2
- Harry Styles
- Kim Kardashian
- Elnaz Rekabi
- Marjane Satrapi
- Zar Amir Ebrahimi
- Kim de l'Horizon
- Ali Velshi
- Greta Thunberg
- Morteza
- Ebi
- Behrouz Vossoughi
- French Film Industry
- Parviz Sayyad
- Golshifteh Farahani
- Googoosh
- Rana Mansour
- Nazanin Zaghari-Ratcliffe
- Nurgül Yeşilçay
- Elif Shafak
- Kianush Sanjari
- Leah Remini
- Justin Bieber
- Yungblud
- Dua Lipa
- Kylie Jenner
- Halsey
- Nathaniel Buzolic
- Phil Heath
- Khaby Lame
- Sharon Stone
- Bella Hadid
- Eda Ece
- Ebru Gündeş
- Demet Özdemir
- Gökhan Alkan
- Burcu Biricik
- J. K. Rowling
- Kylie Moore-Gilbert
- Shahyar Ghanbari
- Shohreh Bayat
- Margaret Atwood
- Chris de Burgh
- Fernando Pimenta
- Shahin Najafi
- Hichkas
- Kiosk
- Golazin
- Abjeez
- Sevdaliza
- Jessica Chastain
- Bill Clinton
- Melika Balali
- Muse
- Penélope Cruz
- Tony Blair
- Paolo Maldini
- Toni Kroos
- Claudio Marchisio
- Josep Borrell
- Annalena Baerbock
- Justin Trudeau
- Mélanie Joly
- Nazanin Nour
- Afshin Naghouni

=== Inside Iran ===
- Ali Daei
- Toomaj Salehi
- Gohar Eshghi
- Asghar Farhadi
- Pegah Ahangarani
- Abdolreza Kahani
- Bahram Beyzai
- Hossein Ronaghi
- Fatemeh Motamed-Arya
- Taraneh Alidoosti
- Navid Mohammadzadeh
- Marzieh Boroumand
- Rasoul Khadem
- Sajjad Esteki
- Mojtaba Abedini
- Kimia Yazdian
- Iran men's national sitting volleyball team
- Iran national beach soccer team
- Iran men's national basketball team
- Iran men's national water polo team
- Persepolis F.C.
- Esteghlal F.C.
- Voria Ghafouri
- Ehsan Hajsafi
- Katayoun Riahi
- Mohsen Chavoshi
- Anahita Hemmati
- Reza Attaran
- Amir Jafari
- Shahram Nazeri
- Kayhan Kalhor
- Shaghayegh Dehghan
- Hengameh Ghaziani
- Sahar Zakaria
- Sirvan Khosravi
- Xaniar Khosravi
- Afsaneh Bayegan
- Rakhshān Banietemad
- Hootan Shakiba
- Kambiz Dirbaz
- Maryam Palizban
- Bahar Dehkordi

== See also ==
- Timeline of the Mahsa Amini protests
