= Mahdyar Aghajani =

Iranian musician, composer, and producer (born 1989)

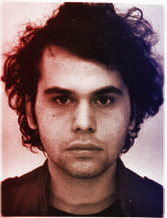

Background information
- Born: Mahdyar Aghajani; January 22, 1989 (age 37)
- Origin: Tehran, Iran
- Genres: Experimental, soundtrack, fusion, hip hop, electronic
- Occupations: Musician, film composer, record producer
- Years active: 2005–present
- Website: www.mahdyar.com

Mahdyar Aghajani (Persian: مهدیار آقاجانی; born 22 January 1989) is a musician, record producer and composer born and raised in Tehran, Iran. He raised the standard of Iranian underground music, using Persian traditional instruments (such as oud, santoor, daf, tombak, ney, kamancheh and qanoon) in electronic and hip hop music.

== Career ==
In 2006 Hichkas released the first Iranian hip hop album Jangale Asfalt (The Asphalt Jungle). Mahdyar Aghajani, musician and producer of this album, integrated hip hop and Iranian traditional music in a creative way. Mahdyar's production on Jangale Asfalt has nonetheless set a new benchmark in the evolution of Persian rap, with tracks like "Vatan Parast" ("The Patriot") serving as the fusion of Iranian/Middle Eastern harmonies and pounding urban protest music.

After an interview with Nasim-E-Haraz magazine regarding the release of his first mainstream album in 2006 with Hichkas, Mahdyar faced pressured from the Iranian government. This was the most influential collaboration between Hichkas and Mahdyar and music they produced together was listened throughout Europe and Iran, so much so the government noticed the artists as a threat to the culture of Iran and had his name listed as a threat, despite use of traditional Iranian instruments and strong nationalistic lyrics.

In 2009 Mahdyar composed the original soundtrack for the film No One Knows About Persian Cats. The film criticizes Iranian government policies regarding underground music. No One Knows About Persian Cats success at the 2009 Cannes Film Festival got part of the crew of the film in trouble with Iranian authorities. The pressure resulted in Mahdyar leaving his family behind at the age of 20 and he fled to Berlin then to Paris where he currently resides. He is busy with the production for couple of albums including Hichkas's forthcoming album and his own debut album

== Soundtracks ==
=== Feature films ===
- 2009: No One Knows About Persian Cats
- 2014: Rosewater
- 2014: Desert Dancer

=== Short films ===
- 2008: The Official Prince of Persia
- 2010: Demandez au Vent

=== Documentaries ===
- 2010: Cultures of Resistance
- 2011: Chroniques d'un Iran Interdit
- 2015: K2 and the Invisible Footmen
- 2016: Cast from the Storm
- 2017: Burkinabè Rising

== Solo ==
=== Albums ===
- 2018: Seized

=== Singles ===
- 2011: Weasels and Warcries
- 2011: New Bloom
- 2013: Bang
- 2016: Gomrok
- 2017: Money Money

== Production credits ==
=== 2006 ===
- Hichkas – The Asphalt Jungle

01. "Moghaddame"
02. "Dide o Del (feat. Reveal, Amin Fooladi and Bidad)"
03. "Ekhtelaf"
04. "Man Vaystadam"
05. "Introduction"
06. "Ghanoon"
07. "Vatan Parast (feat. Reveal and Amin Fooladi)"
08. "Oun Manam"
09. "Bar Paa"
10. "Zendan (featuring Reveal)"
11. "Dide o Del (Remix) (feat. Reveal, Amin Fooladi and Bidad)"
12. "Har Tor Shodeh Migam (Bonus Track)"

=== 2008 ===
- Hichkas

"Bunch of Soldiers"Ye Mosht Sarbaz"

=== 2009 ===
- Bahman Ghobadi – No One Knows About Persian Cats

12. "Jouwani"

=== 2010 ===
- Hichkas

"Ye Rooze Khoob Miad"
This song has become an instant hit, often blasting from cars on Tehran's busy streets in capital city Tehran.

=== 2011 ===
- The Tour of Duty EP

01. "Hichkas - Anjām Vazife"
02. "Reveal - 021LDN"
03. "Hichkas - Mā Az Ounāshim"
04. "Fadaei - Vāstā Lāshi"
05. "Quf - Shak (Feat. Fadaei)"

- Quf – Zir o Bam e Zirzamin

01. "Sobhe Masnavi"
02. "Balatar 1"
03. "Tariki"
04. "Hadaf (Feat. Bidad)"
05. "I.R.A.N. (Feat. 7Khat)"
06. "Hesse Gharib"
07. "Khavar Miane (Feat. Lowkey)"
08. "Fazaye Sard"
09. "Marjan (Feat. Reveal)"
10. "Miane Ghamhayam (Feat. Fadaei)"
11. "Balatar 2"
12. "Shabe Khazan"

=== 2012 ===
- Hichkas - Young N Foolish (Feat. Reveal & Quf & Kool G Rap)
- Fadaei - Adl EP

01. "Zendegi"
02. "Sarzamine Madari"
03. "Chi Shenidi (Feat. Hichkas)"
04. "Jabe Jadooyi"
05. "80 (Feat. Quf)"
06. "Nemidoonam"

=== 2013 ===
- Birdy Nam Nam - Written in the Sand (Mahdyar Aghajani Remix)

=== 2018 ===
- Mahdyar Aghajani - Seized

01. Seize
02. Money Money
03. Timmy Might Bury Y’all
04. Vow
05. Hush
06. Iran Iraq
07. Khakis
08. Running from
09. Lust
10. Glimmer of
11. Twist the Facts

=== 2020 ===
- Hichkas - Mojaz

01." Rosva"
02." To koja boodi?"
03." Sakhte mosalmoon boodan"
04." Ghazi mano doost dasht"
05." Man kiam?"
06." Chera nemimiri?"
07." Az ashnayitoon khoshalam"
08." Shabi gorga"
09." Khalaaf kaaraye asli"
10." Terroreshoon kon"
11." Jadvalo roya"
12." Sheytoone mige"
13." Ki mige"
14." Ye maks"
15." Mahze mokhaalefat"
16." Va zir"

- Quf - Tarane alidoosti
- Fadaei - Dige Tablo Shode
- Fadaei - Abi Ghermaz
- Shapur - Ettelaat

=== 2021 ===
- Fadaei - Koli
- Fadaei - Bilit
- Fadaei - Fatehe
- Fadaei - Sarnegooni
- Shapur - Ghasem kojayi
- Fadaei - Az Karaj Ta Langerud

=== 2022 ===
- Fadaei - Hagh

01." Moghaddame"
02." Tavaf"
03." Alef"
04." Maslahati"
05." Timarestane Dahe 60"
06." Mehr O Raha"
07." Mage Chi Mishe"
08." Mohajer"
09." Narefigh (Feat. Shapur)"
10." Zard"
11." Az Samime Ghalb"
12." Rahbar"
13." Khoon"

- Shapur - Marg Bar Kolle Nezam
- Fadaei - Taskhir
- Fadaei - Meshki
- Shapur - Kerkere

=== 2023 ===
- Fadaei - Yadegari
- Fadaei - Achmaz (Feat. Shapur)
- Shapur - Miam Pishet
- Shapur - Faramooshi (Feat. Fadaei)
- Shapur - Alaki
- Fadaei - Tehran
- Shapur - Dalghak

=== 2024 ===
- Shapur - Sagpedar
- Shapur - Fact
- Shapur - Batel
- Fadaei - Bolandtar
- Shapur - Darvish
- Fadaei - Balast
- Shapur - Kamin (Feat. Fadaei)
- Fadaei - Ashegh

01." Beluga"
02." Khaen"
03." Ashegh"
04." Mosallahim (Feat. Shapur)"
05." Migiri"
06." Atish"
07." Benz"

- Fadaei - Ma Yademoon Nemire

=== 2025 ===
- Shapur - Kavir
- Shapur - Sefid
- Fadaei - Mamoolan
- Fadaei - Khodafez

=== 2026 ===
- Rend Album By Fadaei
- Fadaei - Soghot
