= Reza Pishro =

Iranian rapper, songwriter and record producer

Reza Pishro رضا پیشرو
- Pishro during an appearance on BBC Persian's Bolour-e Banafsh in 2018

Background information
- Born: Mohammad Reza Naseri Azad
- Origin: Tehran, Iran
- Genres: Persian rap, hip hop
- Occupations: Rapper, songwriter, record producer
- Years active: 1998–present
- Label: Rail

Mohammad Reza Naseri Azad (Persian: محمدرضا ناصری آزاد), known professionally as Reza Pishro (Persian: رضا پیشرو), is an Iranian rapper, songwriter and record producer associated with Persian hip hop. He emerged from the underground rap scene in Iran during the late 1990s and early 2000s and became associated with the collectives 021 and Samet. His discography includes the early independent releases Vaght-e Kasif and Vagheiat-e Talkh, followed by albums such as Jahaname Saket, Aghaz Injast, Doran-e Talaei, Rail, Vol. 1, Azad, Parvaz and Nirvana.

== Career ==
=== Early career ===
Pishro began recording rap music in the late 1990s, initially using the name Reza 3pac, a reference to American rapper Tupac Shakur. He was part of the early generation of Persian-language underground rappers, whose music circulated independently and outside Iran's officially licensed music industry.

His early independent releases included Vaght-e Kasif (2003) and Vagheiat-e Talkh (2006). The latter initially circulated through individual tracks, according to a retrospective discussion of his career published by Owrsi in 2018.

Pishro was associated with the underground collectives 021 and Samet. His work and collaborations formed part of the development of Persian rap during the 2000s. A 2008 Financial Times report on Iranian rappers discussed the emerging underground music scene during this period.

=== Albums and musical development ===
Pishro released Jahaname Saket in 2007, followed by Aghaz Injast in 2010 and Doran-e Talaei in 2012. His later releases include Rail, Vol. 1 (2017), Azad (2019), Parvaz (2021), the EP Barandazi (2022) and Nirvana (2023).

In 2026, he released Acemoon (آسمون), an extended play, and Refigh (رفیق), a collaborative album with Iranian rapper Tohi. The latter includes tracks credited to both artists as well as guest appearances.

=== Collaborations and collectives ===
Pishro has collaborated with several Persian hip-hop artists, including Hichkas, Ho3ein, Bahram, Yas, Tech N9ne, Erfan, Amir Tataloo, Sogand, Saaren, Ali Owj, Bahar Atish, Sadegh, Mehrad Hidden, KamyaR, and Tohi. His collaborations with Hichkas were part of the early history of the 021 and Samet collectives. Owrsi's retrospective account discusses a number of his collaborations and the development of these groups.

Pishro and Hichkas later became involved in a public musical dispute, which included diss tracks exchanged between the two artists. The disagreement and their earlier association have been discussed in retrospective accounts of Persian rap.

=== Arrest and departure from Iran ===
Pishro was arrested in Iran in 2018. The Human Rights Activists News Agency (HRANA) reported on his arrest and subsequent developments in the case.

Iran Human Rights Monitor also published a report about his arrest in February 2018.

Pishro later left Iran and continued his musical activities abroad. His departure and the circumstances surrounding it have been mentioned in Persian-language coverage and interviews.

=== Musical themes ===
Pishro's music has been discussed in relation to the social and political themes found in Persian rap. A 2019 academic article, "Music as Resistance; Counter-Hegemonic Themes in Persian-Iranian Rap", examined the lyrics of several Iranian rappers, including Pishro, in the context of counter-hegemonic themes in Persian rap.

Pishro's work has also appeared in discussions of Iranian protest music. Variety included the song "Enghelab Solh" among its selection of Iranian protest songs published following the death of Mahsa Amini in 2022.

== Discography ==
=== Albums and extended plays ===
Year	Title	Notes
2003	Vaght-e Kasif (وقت کثیف)	Unofficial release
2006	Vagheiat-e Talkh (واقعیت تلخ)	Unofficial release
2007	Jahaname Saket (جهنم ساکت)	
2010	Aghaz Injast (آغاز اینجاست)	
2012	Doran-e Talaei (دوران طلایی)	
2017	Rail, Vol. 1 (ریل، جلد یک)	
2019	Azad (آزاد)	
2021	Parvaz (پرواز)	
2022	Barandazi (براندازی)	EP
2023	Nirvana (نیروانا)	
2026	Acemoon (آسمون)	EP
2026	Refigh (رفیق)	Collaborative album with Tohi
