= Bahar Dehkordi =

Background information
- Also known as: Bahar Atish
- Born: November 19, 1990 (age 35); Tehran, Iran (Resides: Canada)
- Genres: Rap; R&B; Hip hop; Trap; Pop
- Occupations: Singer; Theatre actor; Director
- Years active: 2005–present

Bahar Dehkordi (born November 19, 1990), known by her stage name Bahar Atish, is an Iranian rapper, theatre actress, and women's rights activist. Bahar was one of the detained women active in the field of Persian rap.

== Biography ==
Bahar was born on November 19, 1990, in Tehran. She is one of the two daughters of Parviz Dehkordi and the eldest daughter of the family. Bahar entered the Persian rap scene at a young age during her teenage years. Through her music, she expressed her opposition to the political and social situation caused by the Islamic Republic regime, which led to her arrest at the age of fifteen. She is a strong supporter of gender equality and women's rights, which are also reflected in her songs. Bahar's father was also a victim of the policies of the Islamic Republic, and Bahar talks about her father's influence on her activism:

I learned freedom and protesting against injustice alongside my father. I chose the stage name "Atish" because I was determined to burn the rulers with my music who had destroyed my father's youth and life.

Her activities in music have led to her being arrested twice. Singing illegal songs in Iran led to Bahar's arrest at the age of 15 in 2005 by the forces of the Islamic Republic of Iran. At that time, Bahar was the first woman to be arrested for rapping. Her first official song was released in 2007, which once again led to her arrest. Due to a suspended sentence and release on bail, her music activities were temporarily halted. However, after being detained, she continued her artistic endeavors in other fields and studied theatre at University of Art, Tehran. Despite the pressures, Bahar continued her activism and singing protest songs in Iran and eventually, in 2022, after re-recording the song "Az Jens-e Paeez" (From the Autumn), which was sung in support of the Women, Life, Freedom Movement, she was forced to leave Iran. After leaving Iran, she migrated to Turkey and then to Canada, where she currently resides.

== Music career ==
Bahar Atish works in various genres including Rap, Old School Hip Hop, and R&B. She was one of the first women to participate in underground concerts in Iran, starting this activity in 2007. Her song "Emshab Shab-e Maast" (Tonight is Our Night) was one of the first songs Bahar officially released on October 19, 2009. The themes of her songs mostly focus on women's rights, freedom in Iran, and political and social issues. Bahar Atish addresses the necessity of Gender Equality in songs like "Kham" (Raw) and "Najib" (Noble). Other prominent songs of hers include "Az Jens-e Paeez" (From the Autumn), "Tolu" (Sunrise), and "Shakaf" (Crack). In the song "Shakaf," which addresses the social divide in Iran, Bahar uses the Trap style. Bahar has also released two EPs, and songs like "Zahre Aqrab" (Scorpion's Poison) and "Khoda Banu" (God's Lady) were successful tracks from these albums. She also released the ethnic protest song "No to Execution." Bahar collaborated with other artists such as Justina on songs like "Faryad Azadi" (Shout for Freedom) and "Radikal" (Radical). She also collaborated on the songs "Chetor Mishe" (How Can It Be) and "Enqelabe Solh" (Peace Revolution) with artists such as Reza Pishro, Amir Tataloo, Ardalan Tohmeh, and Pootak. The two songs “Shimiyaei” and “Tabeid” are the latest works by Bahar Atish, released as music videos on YouTube.

=== Singles ===
#	Name	Artist	Duration
1	Az Jens-e Paeez (From the Autumn)	Bahar Atish	2:26
2	Faghat To Miayi (Only You Come)	Bahar Atish	2:41
3	Enqelabe Solh (Peace Revolution)	Bahar Atish, Tataloo, Reza Pishro, Pootak	4:48
4	Tolu (Sunrise)	Bahar Atish	2:39
5	Taksir (Multiplication)	Bahar Atish	3:22
6	Faryad Azadi (Shout for Freedom)	Bahar Atish, Justina, Suki, MCM, and others	4:16
7	Shakaf (Crack)	Bahar Atish	2:48
8	Faryad Ma (Our Shout)	Reza Pishro, Bahar Atish, Tataloo	2:52
9	Ghadrat Dast-e Maast (The Power is in Our Hands)	Bahar Atish, Reza Pishro	2:24
10	Chetor Mishe? (How Can It Be?)	Tataloo, Bahar Atish, Reza Pishro, Tohmeh	10:00
11	Emshab Shab-e Maast (Tonight is Our Night)	Bahar Atish, Big Boy	4:02
12	Oboor Ahesteh (Pop)	Bahar Atish	4:10
13	Jaye To Khali (Pop)	Bahar Atish	4:16
14	Nasazgari (Pop)	Bahar Atish	4:29
15	Lanat (Pop)	Bahar Atish	5:47
16	Atish Bazi (Fire Play)	Bahar Atish, 0912	2:43
17	Paye Harf-am Hastam (I Stand by My Word)	Bahar Atish, Reza Pishro	1:50
18	Lilith	Bahar Atish	3:41

=== Albums ===
Zahre Aqrab (1):

#	Name	Artist	Duration
1	Intro	Bahar Atish	2:16
2	Kham (Raw)	Bahar Atish	1:48
3	Marg Ya Azadi (Death or Freedom)	Bahar Atish	3:38
4	Najib (Noble)	Bahar Atish	2:43
5	Payan-e Baz (Open End)	Bahar Atish	2:32

Zahre Aqrab (2):

#	Name	Artist	Duration
1	Shok (Shock)	Bahar Atish	3:26
2	Roya (Dream)	Bahar Atish	3:41
3	Khoda Banu (God's Lady)	Bahar Atish	3:10
4	Zahre Aqrab (Scorpion's Poison)	Bahar Atish	3:26

== Cinema career ==
Bahar, who had studied in the field of theater and took some time off from the underground music scene to complete her degree, continued her career in cinema by performing in theater and short films. She also played a role as an assistant director and presenter in the program "Horeh." This program was about unsanitized interviews with Iranian musicians. During this time, Dekhordi performed in various theater productions. She starred in the play "Agha Zobih" written by Mehdi Maleki. In that play, the jury of the first play reading festival awarded special recognition to the actors of the play. Other plays in which she performed include "The Only Way Possible" and "Objects Are Closer Than They Appear in the Mirror". She also collaborated in the play "Avaye Ab" directed by Atieh Javidi.

The play "Ramali", written by Behzad Zandieh and directed by Bahar Dekhordi, was one of the selected plays that entered the Fourth City Theater Festival in 2015. After a period of working in cinema, she resumed her musical activities at the end of the 2010s.

== Gallery ==
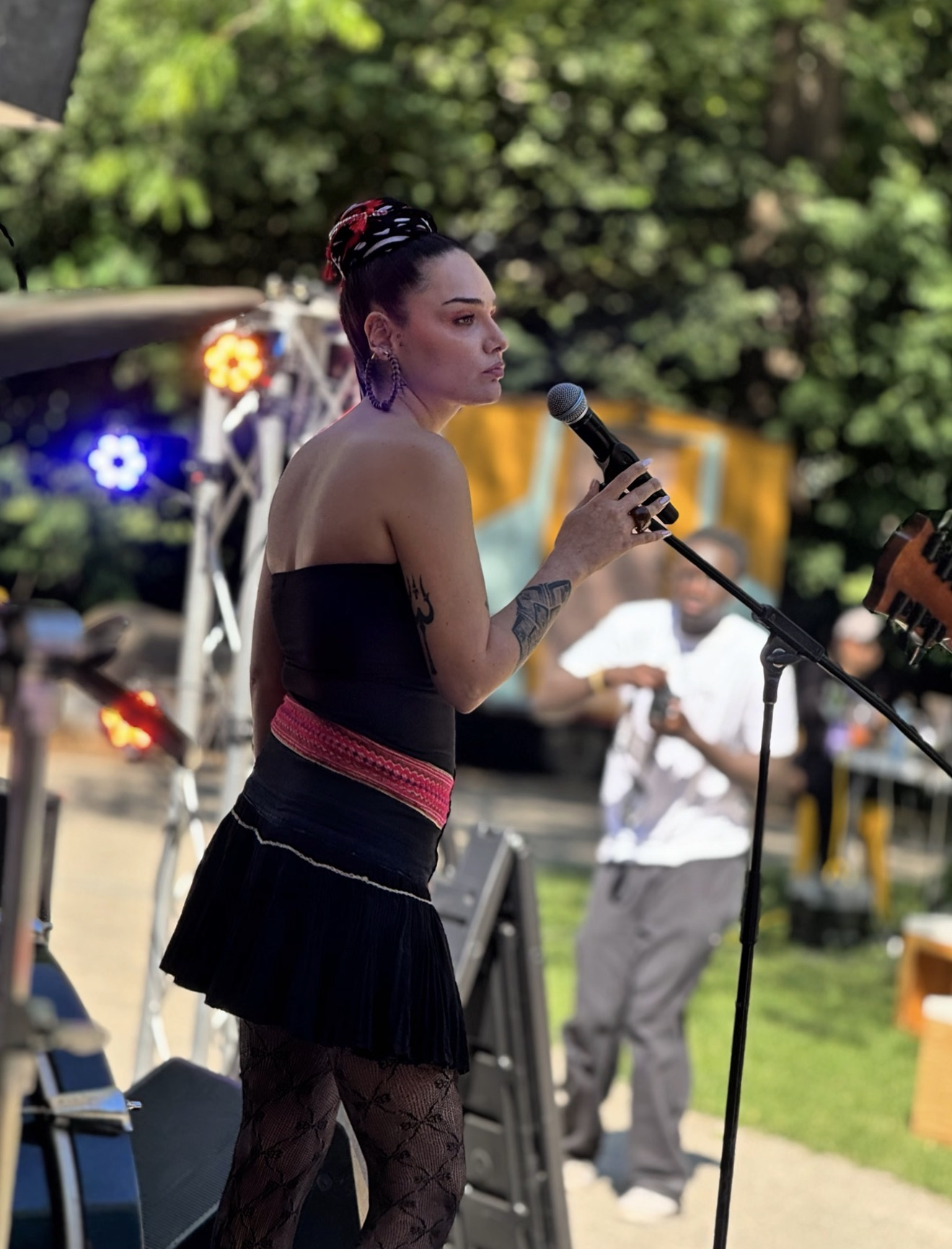
Bahar Dehkordi at the Small World Music Festival in 2026

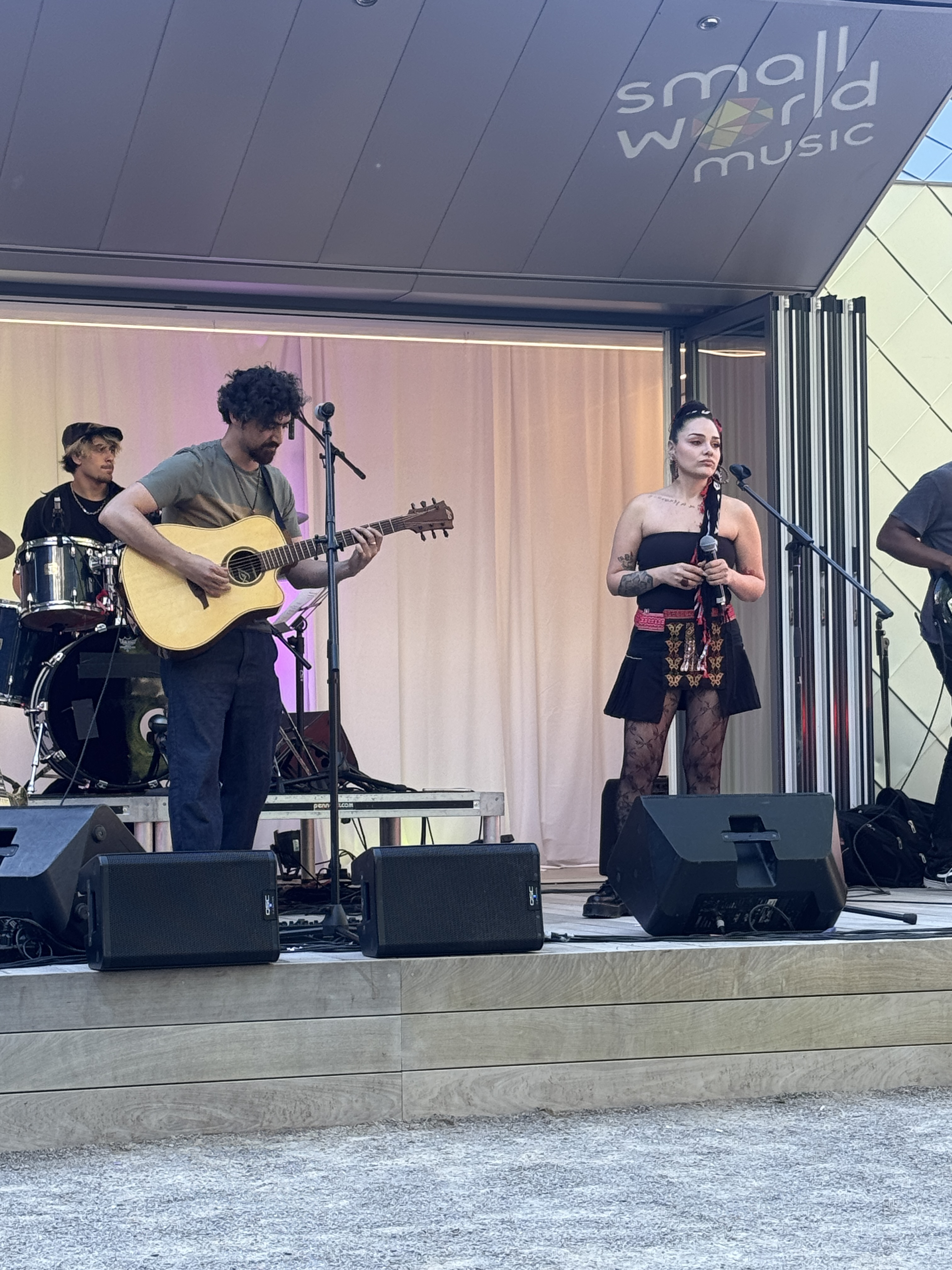
Bahar Dehkordi at the Small World Music Festival in 2026

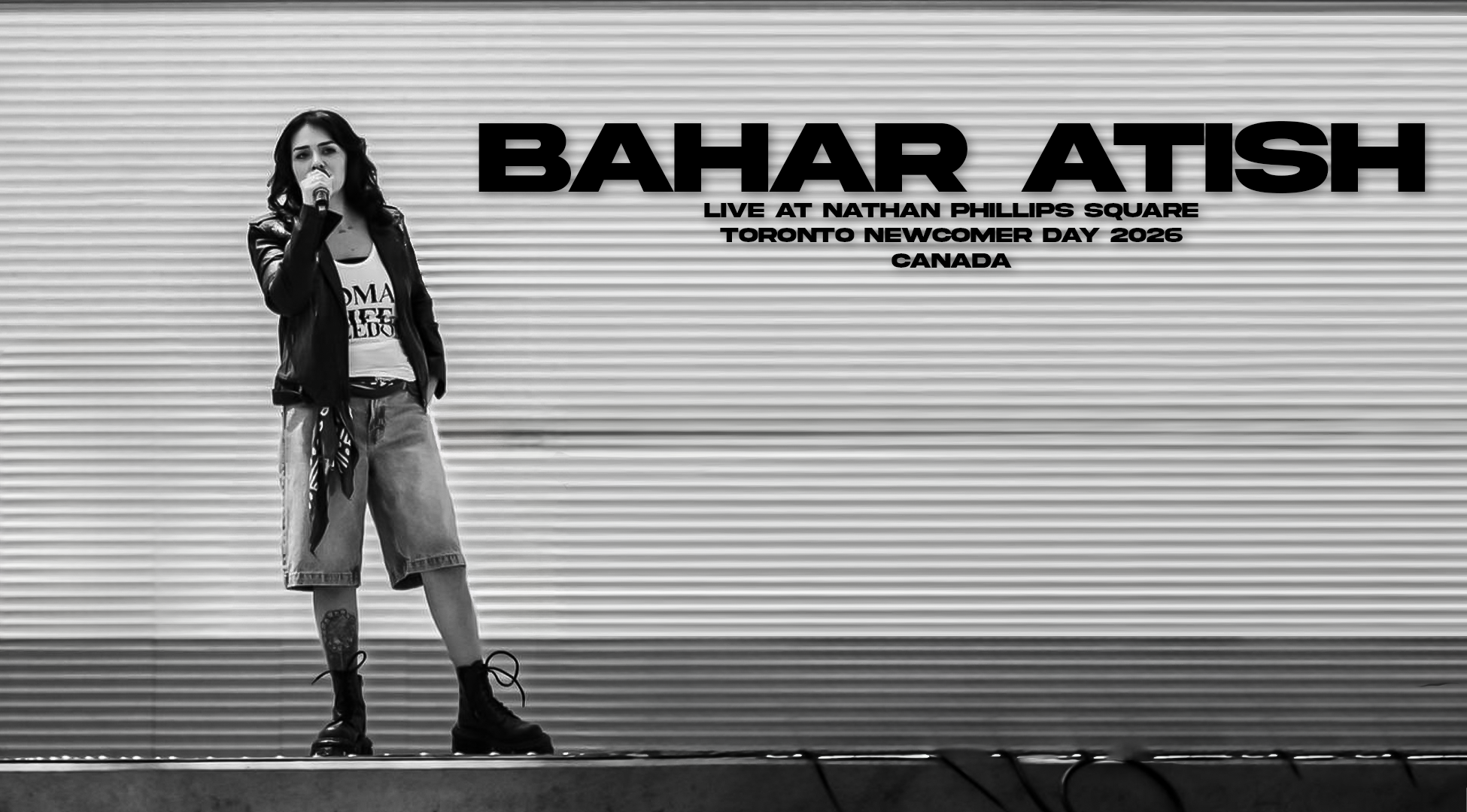
Bahar Dehkordi at Toronto Newcomer Day in 2026

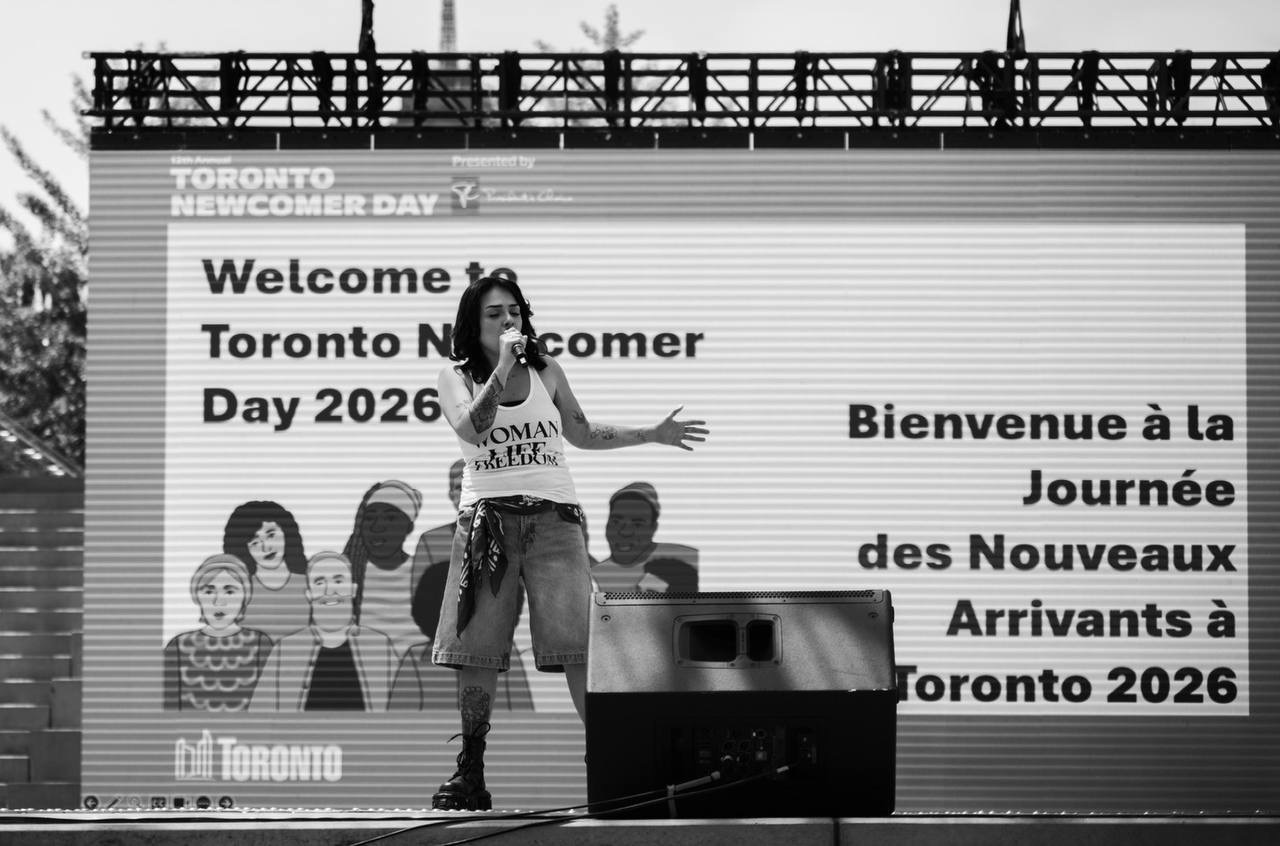
Bahar Dehkordi at Toronto Newcomer Day in 2026

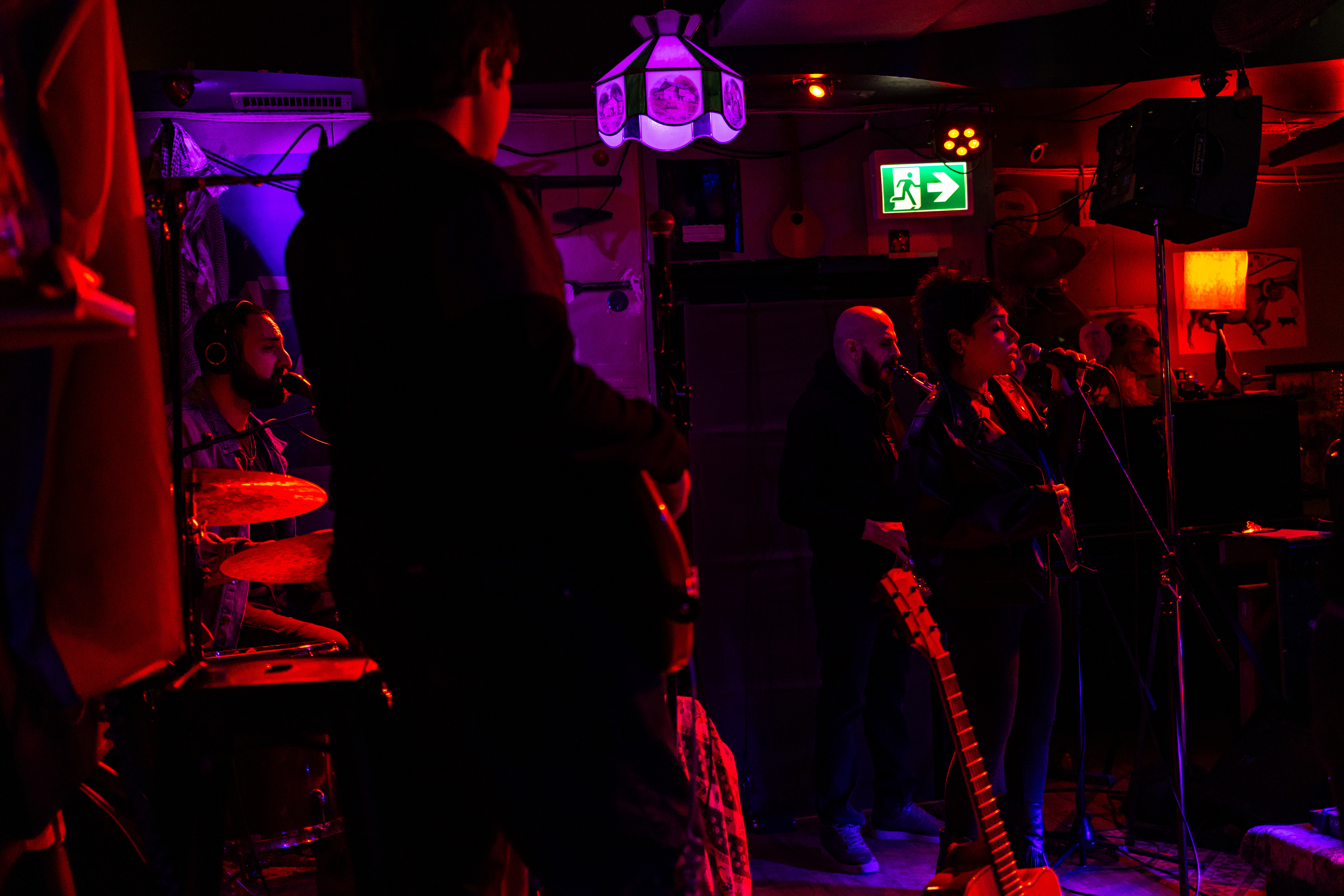
Bahar Dehkordi, 2025

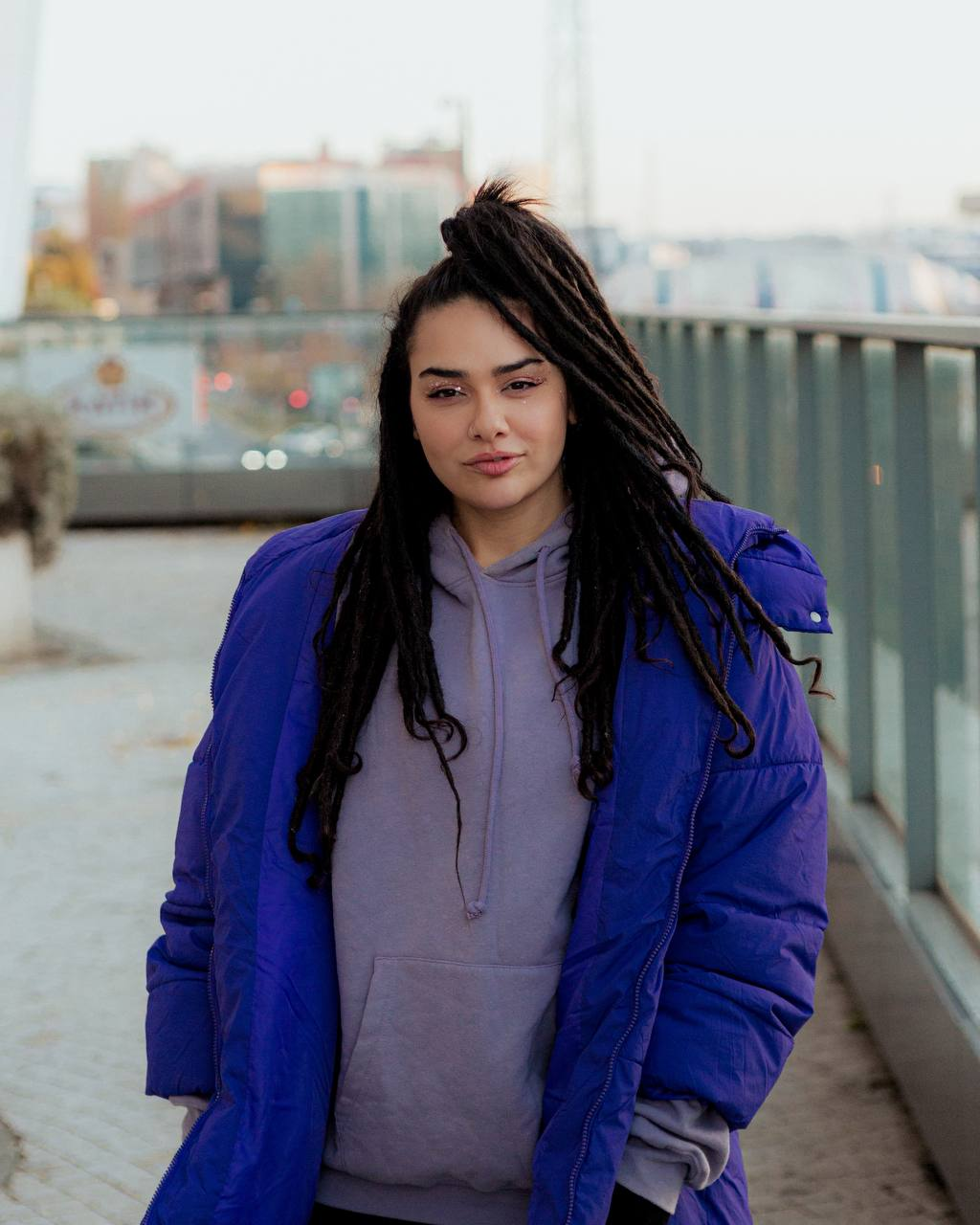
Bahar Dehkordi, 2023

== See also ==
- List of Iranian hip-hop artists
