= Death and the Judge =

- Directed by: Hassan Khademi
- Produced by: Mehdi Kouhian
- Cinematography: Alireza Soltani, Aref Namvar
- Edited by: Shahrooz Tavakol
- Release date: 2018
- Running time: 54 minutes
- Country: Iran
- Language: Persian

Death and the Judge is a 2018 Iranian documentary film directed by Hassan Khademi. The film narrates the life and career of Nourollah Aziz-Mohammadi, an Iranian criminal judge who has issued more than 4,000 death sentences during his career. The film won the AIFIC Award at the Iran's Cinema Verite Film Festival and the Bertha Fund Award at the Amsterdam International Documentary Film Festival.

== Reception ==
Reza Hosseini points out that the film has its weaknesses, but the appeal of the subject and the stubbornness of the filmmaker make it spectacular. Salahedin Ghaderi (from Kharazmi University) provides a sociological review of the film and calls it a "good text" for sociological inquiry.

Seyed Reza Saemi believes that "the hardest part of judging is the judgment of the offender sentenced to death, and that is enough to probably make negative assumptions about this judge in the minds of the audience, but as the film progresses and we become more familiar with Aziz Mohammadi's character, gradually that presumptuous stance comes closer to a fair trial."

== See also ==
- Rapping in Tehran
