= Jangale Asfalt =

The Asphalt Jungle

Studio album by Hichkas
- Released: 1 October 2006
- Recorded: 2005–2006
- Genre: Hip hop
- Length: 37:13
- Label: 021
- Producer: Mahdyar Aghajani

Hichkas chronology
| The Asphalt Jungle (2006) | Permissible (2020) |

The Asphalt Jungle (Persian: جنگل آسفالت, lit. 'The Asphalt Jungle') is the debut studio album by Iranian rapper Hichkas, released unauthorized and underground on 1st October 2006. Written by Hichkas and produced by Mahdyar Aghajani, it is considered as the first professional Iranian hip hop album.

== Background ==
The album was composed by Mahdyar Aghajani who was 18 at the time. This album is a combination of hip hop and traditional Iranian music (for example Persian instruments were used). Three tracks of this album have been performed in English with the collaboration of Reveal, a British rapper of Iranian descent.

== Composition ==
The album was originally released in 2006 in Iran. It is considered the first Iranian hip-hop album: A blend of conventional instruments, such as the santoor and tombak, with pounding electronic beats serves as the backdrop to Hichkas's smooth rapping. Many songs, like "Dideh Va Del", feature a chorus overflowing with echoes of traditional vocals encased within verses that rap observations of Iran's current social climate. Other songs, like "Vatan Parast", mute classical instruments to allow more modern hip hop elements. What these songs, and Jangale Asfalt as a whole, did was aid in producing a form of expression that belonged solely to the Iranian youth.

== Controversy ==
In 2006, after the release of this album, Hichkas was arrested by the Iranian authorities and accused of releasing music without permission. He was later released, but encountered difficulties with local authorities in Iran.

In an interview with Index on Censorship Hichkas said, "When we made physical copies of our first album Jangale Asphalt in 2006, we were arrested whilst selling it on the streets of Tehran. You can't just sell records in Iran, you need to seek approval from the authorities before you release anything or perform concerts. There is no structure or support system for musicians to perform freely, and in particular for hip hop artists."

== Track listing ==
All tracks were produced by Mahdyar Aghajani and written by Hichkas, except where noted.

The Asphalt Jungle track listing
| No. | Title | Writer(s) | Original title | Length |
|---|---|---|---|---|
| 1. | "Intro" | | Moghaddameh | 1:22 |
| 2. | "Eye and Heart" | | Dideh va Del | 4:51 |
| 3. | "Difference" (featuring: Reveal; Amin Fouladi; Bidad) | Hichkas; Reveal; Amin Fouladi; Bidad | Ekhtelaf | 3:42 |
| 4. | "I'm Standing" | | Man Vaistadam | 4:06 |
| 5. | "Intro of The Law" | | Moghaddameh Ghanoon | 0:31 |
| 6. | "The Law" | | Ghanoon | 4:10 |
| 7. | "The Patriot" (featuring: Reveal; Amin Fouladi) | Hichkas; Reveal; Amin Fouladi | Vatan Parast | 4:14 |
| 8. | "That's Me" | | Oon Manam | 3:39 |
| 9. | "Afoot" | | Barpa | 3:13 |
| 10. | "Prison" (featuring Reveal) | Hichkas; Reveal | Zendan | 3:30 |
| 11. | "Eye and Heart - Remix" (featuring: Reveal; Amin Fouladi; Bidad) | Hichkas; Reveal; Amin Fouladi; Bidad | Dideh va Del - Remix | 3:50 |
| Total length: | | | | 37:13 |

== Personnel ==
Credits adapted from Hichkas's Spotify credits.

- Hichkas – vocals
- Mahdyar Aghajani – producer
- Reveal – vocals
- Amin Fouladi – vocals
- Bidad – vocals
