= Rapping in Tehran =

- Directed by: Hassan Khademi
- Release date: 2009
- Running time: 37 minutes
- Country: Iran
- Language: Persian

Rapping in Tehran is a 2009 documentary film directed by Hassan Khademi. The film depicts the situation of underground music in Iran. The film has participated in several international film festivals including Dok Leipzig, ZagrebDox, United Nations Association Film Festival (UNAFF), Copenhagen International Documentary Film Festival and Peace on Earth Film Festival (POEFF). It was nominated for Best Screen Play at the World Music & Independent Film Festival (2010) and won the Special Jury Award from the Chicago International Movies and Music Festival (2010).

== Synopsis ==
The documentary looks at the creation of "underground music" in the Islamic Republic of Iran and shows the daily struggle of young people against the repressive traditional apparatus. Law enforcement agencies are strongly opposed to rap music due to its social content.

== See also ==
- Iranian hip hop
- Death and the Judge
