= Iranian hip-hop =

Musical genre

Iranian hip hop (Persian: هیپ‌هاپ ایرانی), also known as Persian hip hop (هیپ‌هاپ فارسی), refers to hip hop music in the Persian language developed in Iran and the Iranian diaspora. It originated from American hip hop culture, but has developed into a distinct rap style that draws on Iranian cultural concepts and engages with the modern issues Iranians are facing today.

== History ==
Hip hop emerged within Iran in the late 1990s, when a few Iranians started translating American gangsta rap into Persian and spread recordings of these songs on the internet. A little later these individuals would start writing their own lyrics and experimented with producing original tracks.

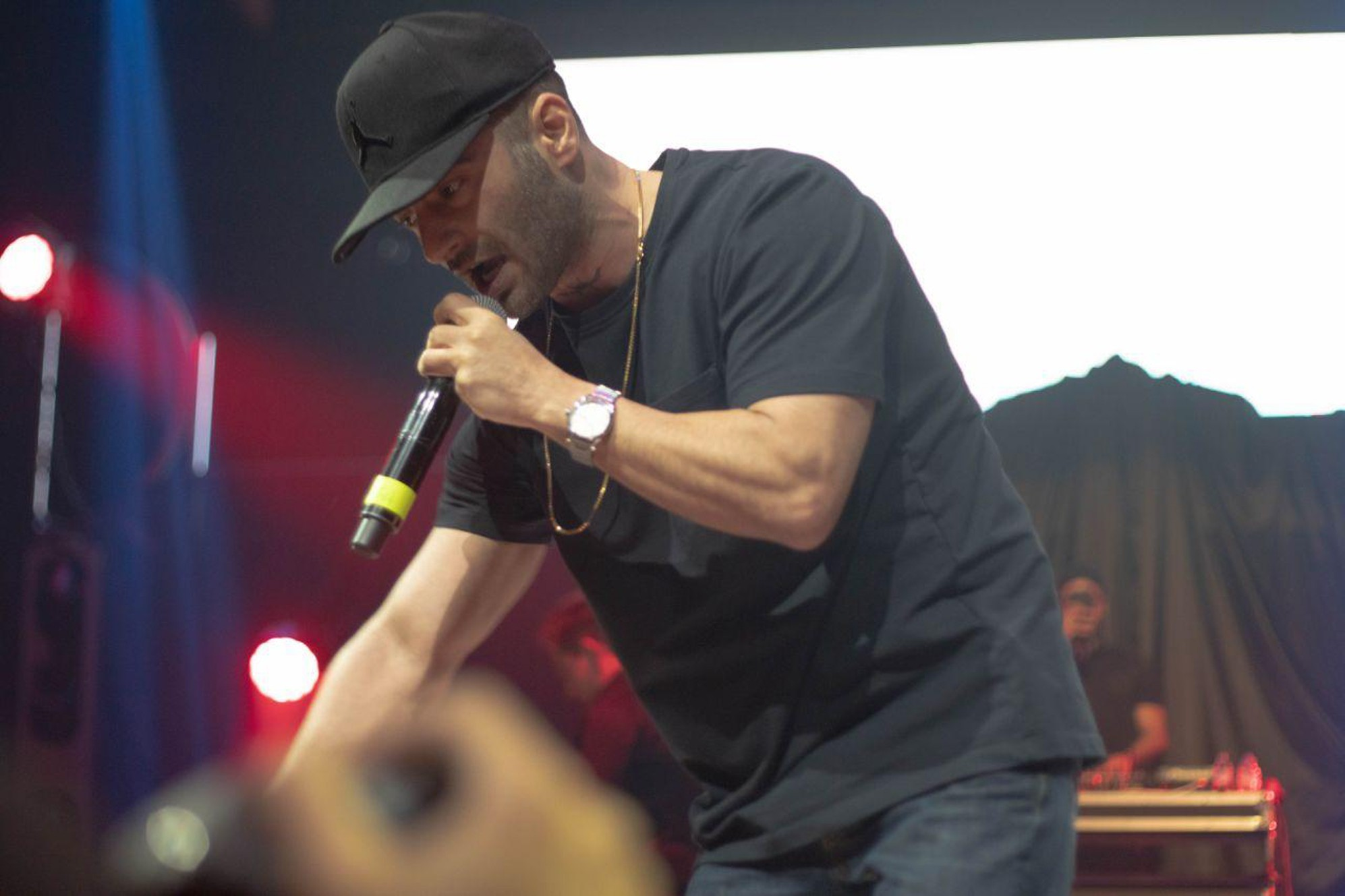
Yas is a rapper in Iranian hip-hop style

Iranian hip hop originates from the country's capital Tehran, although a number of experimental works were recorded earlier by diasporan Iranian musicians, particularly in Los Angeles. In the early 2000s, rap music did not enjoy huge popularity yet within Iran and the emerging hip hop scene consisted of a relatively small community of artists based in several Iranian cities. Rappers often gathered to discuss what to rap about and write lyrics together. Hip hop tracks were recorded in basements and bedrooms turned into recording studios. Many now known artists started in these hidden studios, including 021, Zedbazi, and Amir Tataloo. Because of the illegal status of rap in Iran, these tracks had to be circulated through unofficial channels, which sometimes required artists to get creative: Yas and Hichkas for example, two rappers who belong to the 'first generation' of Iranian hip hop, have recounted how they would throw their CDs through the windows of cars waiting at traffic lights.

Hip hop became more accessible in the mid-2000s, when the advance of the internet made it easier and cheaper for artists to reach their audiences. In 2003 a rap website called RapFa aired. Another website that was established at the same time was Bia2Rap. The founders of this website started their work in the form of a blog. Bia2rap website was filtered in 2008 by Iranian government, for the crime of broadcasting rap music. Through this music platform Iranian hip hop and its community could grow nationwide. On the website hip hop songs can be uploaded and reviewed. Artists can also communicate with each other and their listeners online. Before this website artists could often not do so and audiences were limited. This website also allowed artists to gain exposure and even make music videos, the earliest video dates back to 2005. In the mid-2000s, the first rap songs produced in Iran were aired on Persian news and music channels. As hip hop became more accessible its popularity grew, and by 2008 rap was a widely played musical genre.

Although different governments have restricted musical expression to varying extents, in general rappers cannot get permission to perform in Iran. On several occasions, recording studios have been shut down, websites have been blocked, and artists have been arrested. During the Green Movement that erupted after Mahmoud Ahmadinejad's disputed 2009 re-election, a widespread crackdown on artistic expression occurred that targeted those who had participated in or supported the protests. Many rappers have since emigrated from Iran. Only a few works have been officially approved by the Ministry of Culture and Islamic Guidance. Hip hop dance is also present in underground movements, with few performances having received limited permission.

== Hip hop and politics ==
=== Hip hop and the Iranian government ===
Hip hop music is not considered a legitimate artform by Iran's authorities. All forms of music were banned shortly after the 1979 Iranian Revolution. While this decision has since been partially reversed, the Iranian government continues to crack down on music that it considers harmful. Hip hop music, perceived and portrayed by the government as a morally degrading import from the West, falls in this category and is thus mostly prohibited in Iran. All artists in Iran are obliged to submit their productions to the Ministry of Culture and Islamic Guidance for approval, which almost never deems hip hop tracks appropriate for release. The result of this is that most of the Iranian hip hop scene has been forced to go underground. Female artists are especially restricted in Iran, as women cannot sing in public and solo female vocalists are prohibited from performing in front of men.

=== Political themes ===
Rap music and the surrounding hip hop culture that emerged in Iran in the early 20th century defied the country's traditional Islamic conventions and customs. Due to the inclusion of taboo topics and the use of slang and swearing, hip hop is labeled as subversive and morally corrupting by the traditional segments of Iranian society. This perception has been compounded by state media outlets, which have linked rapping to Satanism. The hip hop scene has been used by artists and their listeners as a space to resist society's Islamic-inspired expectations. As the popularity of hip hop grew, it became more prominent and appreciated as a medium for political criticism. Rapper Bahram Nouraei has vocalized his dissatisfaction with Mahmoud Ahmadinejad's administration in his 2008 breakthrough song Nameye Be Raees Jomhour ("A letter to the President"). His most popular work, Inja Irane ("Here is Iran"), was described as a "poignant critique of the country" by Rolling Stone. Hip hop artists have pointed to the directness inherent in rap music to explain the suitability of the genre as a platform for social and religious critique. However, this does not mean that Islamic values and practices have no place in hip hop, as some artists, such as Tataloo and Sefat, incorporate these themes into their works. There are also rappers who have released pro-government songs. Tataloo, for example, has released 'Energy Hasteei' ("Nuclear energy"), a song supporting Iran's nuclear strategies.

=== Rappers arrested during the Mahsa Amini protests ===
==== Toomaj Salehi ====
On the 30th of October, 2022, rapper Toomaj Salehi (Persian: توماج صالحی) was violently arrested by Iran's security forces. Salehi, who raps under his first name Toomaj, had been actively involved in the Mahsa Amini protests. He was charged with spreading propaganda, cooperating with hostile governments and forming an illegal group aimed at disrupting the country's security. Later the charge of sowing corruption on earth was added, which carries the death sentence. He is currently held in isolation in prison and is mostly denied contact with his lawyers. It has been reported that Salehi has been tortured and requires urgent medical care. His arrest attracted attention from international media outlets, with human rights organizations warning that it is unlikely Salehi or any of the many detained protesters will receive a fair trial. Salehi's songs are socially engaged and have explicitly criticized Iran's government, tackling topics such as poverty, women's inequality, human rights violations and corruption. Shortly before his arrest he released the protest songs Meydoone Jang ("The battlefield") and Faal ("Divination"). In Meydoone Jang, Salehi calls upon his listeners to take part in the uprising, showing clips from the Mahsa Amini protests in the song's music video. In the music video released for Faal, Salehi is seen rapping his lyrics, in which he predicts the end of the Islamic regime, to a man with a concealed face representing the country's ruling system.

==== Saman Yasin ====
Saman Yasin (Persian: سامان یاسین), a Kurdish dissident rapper who condemns oppression and inequality in his works, was arrested violently in October 2022 due to his support for the Mahsa Amini protests. The main charges brought against him were enmity against God and the attempted killing of security officers during a demonstration, which Yasin denied. According to the Kurdistan Human Rights Network, Yasin has been severely mistreated and tortured in order to gain a forced confession, and it has been reported that he tried to take his own life in jail. Yasin was found guilty and sentenced to death in November. Later Iran's Supreme Court annulled Yasin's sentence and called for a retrial, while at the same time upholding the death sentence of another protester called Mohammad Qobadloo.

== Themes ==
Many Iranian hip hop artists focus on the Persian identity, as opposed to Arab identity, in their music. The Persian identity and histories that they pride is often that of the ancient Persian Empire, and not the current state. Some artists incorporate local elements such as Iranian classical music and literature.

Other themes include social and political conditions and events, and slandering other rappers, also called 'dissing'. Furthermore, global hip hop themes, such as violence, sex and drugs, are common topics. In Persian hip hop, these taboo themes tend to be discussed with a view to their broader societal and economic implications, taking on a layer of social or political critique.

== Iranian hip hop artists ==
Both artists in Iran and artists from the Iranian diaspora are regarded as Iranian hip hop artists.

Iran's premier rap group, 021, named after the telephone area code of Tehran, was founded during the late 1990s. Hichkas (Persian: هیچ‌کس), the lead figure of this group, came to be one of Iran's earliest renowned rappers, and therefore nicknamed the Father of Persian Rap. His well-received album Jangale Asfalt ("Asphalt Jungle"), produced by Mahdyar Aghajani, was the first Iranian hip hop album. It incorporated a fusion with traditional Persian harmonies and contributed remarkably to the evolution of hip hop in Iran. Hichkas co-founded 021 music group with Yashar and Shayan duo but they later separated from the group and created their own group renamed Vaajkhonyaa. Hichkas, Mehrak Reveal, Reza Pishro, Ali Quf, Ali Owj, and Mahdyar Aghajani became the prominent members of 021.

Zedbazi (Persian: زدبازی), founded officially in April 2002, is regarded as the pioneer of gangsta rap in Iran. The band quickly gained a huge popularity among the youth, due mainly to their use of explicit lyrics, littered with profanity and depictions of sex and drug use. They are credited with starting a new movement in Iranian music.

Yas (Persian: یاس) was the first Iranian rapper to be authorized to perform in Iran. He reached national fame through his song CD ro Beshkan ("Break the Disk"), which was written about an Iranian actress who was subjected to a sex tape scandal. On 21 December 2011, he was chosen by voters as the "Artist of the Week" on MTV, entitled "Tehran's Hard-Hitting MC".

The restrictions have been more stringent on women. Salome MC (Persian: سالومه ام‌سی), who started her career collaborating with Hichkas, was one of the first women to contribute to Iranian hip hop. She was named as an influential and "revolutionizing" artist by MTV and Time.

=== Rivalry ===
In the early 2000s in Tehran, a rivalry and tension between rappers from East Tehran and West Tehran took place. This rivalry was driven by the disparities in their economic and social backgrounds. In addition, tensions were strengthened by existing rivalries between the East and West Coast in American hip hop culture. Rappers from East Tehran predominantly come from lower middle class or lower class, which is why they are inclined to use hip hop as a medium for social and political commentary. Their lyrics delve into issues like poverty, economic struggles, and social discrimination. Rappers from West Tehran frequently focus on topics like parties, and lifestyles associated with a high socio-economic status. Consequently, rappers from East Tehran look down upon the rappers from the wealthier western part of the city.

== Media ==
In 2009 Hassan Khademi has directed a documentary called Rapping in Tehran. This documentary explores the emerging hip hop scene in the Islamic Republic of Iran. The film was screened at several international film festivals.

== Samples ==
Zamin Safe
A sample of Zamin Safe by Zedbazi.

Nemitooni Band Koni Paamo Be Zamin
A sample of Nemitooni Band Koni Paamo Be Zamin (feat. Paya) by Erfan.

== See also ==
- Music of Iran
- Graffiti in Iran
- Dance in Iran
- List of Iranian hip hop artists
