= Hichkas =

Iranian rapper (born 1985)

Hichkas هیچ‌کس
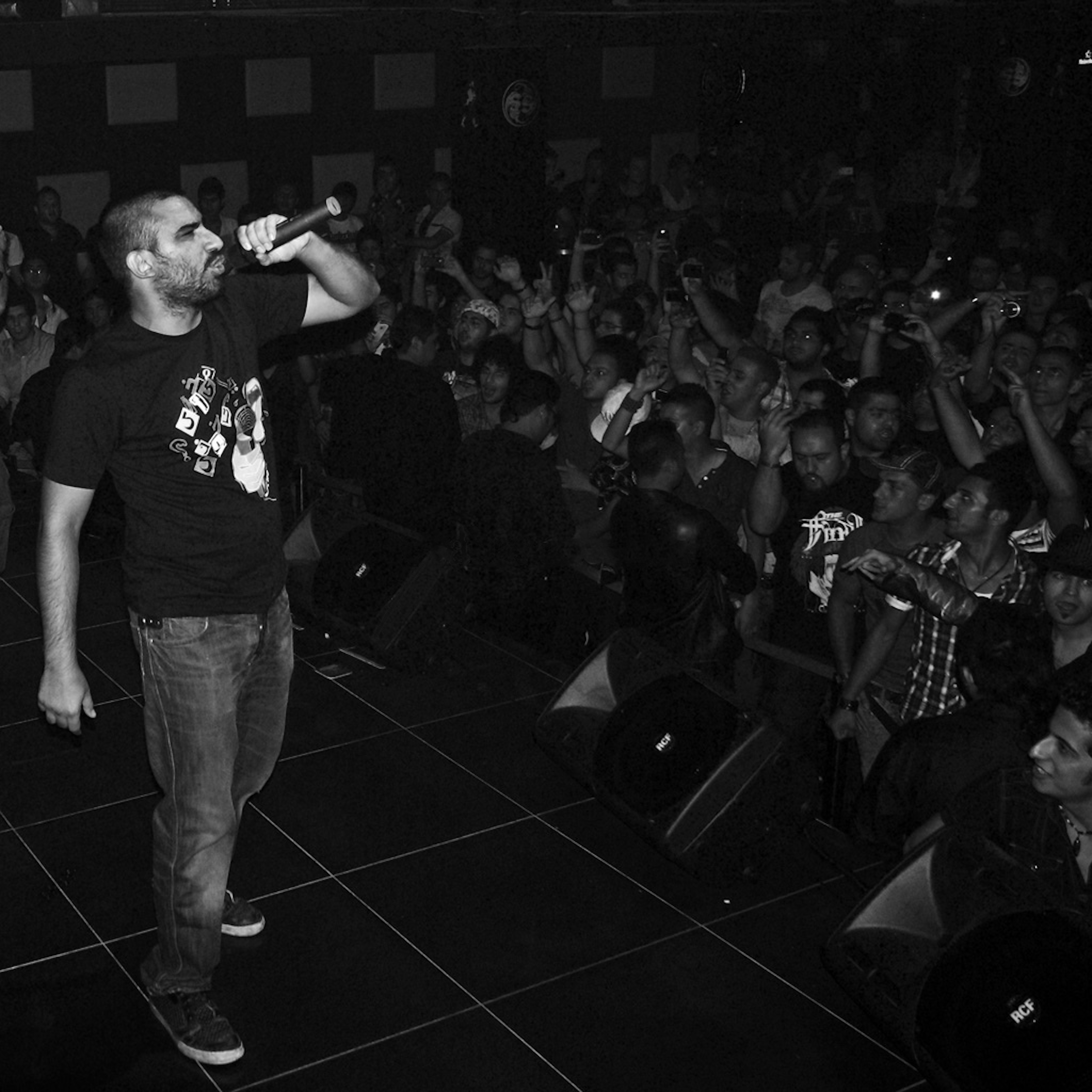
- Hichkas in London 2011

Background information
- Also known as: Hichkas
- Born: Soroush Lashkari; 9 May 1985 (age 41); Tehran, Iran
- Genres: Persian rap; electronic music; persian hip hop
- Occupations: Rapper; singer; songwriter; music producer
- Years active: 1999–present
- Website: www.hichkas.me

Soroush Lashkari (Persian: سروش لشکری; born 9 May 1985), known professionally as Hichkas (هیچ‌کس /ˈhɪtʃˌkæs/; lit. 'nobody'), is an Iranian rapper and singer-songwriter. Credited with popularizing Persian hip hop to the Iranian people and other Persian-speaking countries such as Afghanistan and Tajikistan, Hichkas' national success and acclaimed works are widely regarded as having broken the barriers that were in place by the Islamic regime for the acceptance of rappers in popular music. Hichkas is considered one of the pioneers of Iranian hip hop and is nicknamed "Father of Persian Rap" by his fans. He became a representation of the Iranian underclass and reflected the angst of young Iranians. He has been influential for many artists of various genres and is often cited as one of the greatest rappers of Iranian hip hop.

Hichkas is also the founder of the label 021 (alongside Shayan and Yashar) which is considered the first Persian hip hop group. After that, he founded the labels Saamet (alongside Reza Pishro and Reveal), and Moltafet (alongside Ali Quf, Fadaei, and Dariush). Hichkas' songs are themed around social and cultural issues in Iran and his lyrical ability and influence pervade the hip-hop and rap genre, placing him at the forefront of contemporary Iranian music, inspiring a new generation of Iranian songwriters and artists. Hichkas' first album Jangale Asfalt (Persian: جنگل آسفالت; The Asphalt-paved Jungle) was the first Iranian hip-hop album released in 2005. Hichkas' early releases combined traditional Persian instruments and urban beats to create a hybrid genre, a combination of East and West.

In addition to performance, Hichkas' work further spans into art direction, production, and artist development, working closely with up-and-coming artists, providing mentoring and coaching, and consistently being the inspiration behind many Iranian urban artists. He has appeared as a guest speaker at many universities including Oxford University, Cambridge University, and University of Calgary discussing Iranian poetry, the Iranian underground music scene, and the effects of the Internet on music publishing in Iran.

Hichkas has collaborated with a number of international hip hop artists, including American hip hop artist Kool G Rap. His highly anticipated second album Mojaz (Persian: مجاز; permissible) was released in March 2020, 8 years after its initial announcement.

== Early life ==
Soroush Lashkari was born on 9 May 1985, in Tehran, Iran and is the son of a family of five. He lived in Germany until he was two years old and then lived in the Vanak neighborhood of Tehran. He was studying translation at Garmsar University but dropped out of college for personal reasons and in order to pursue Persian hip hop. His father is from the Ziaabad village of Qazvin and has a family relationship with Hossein Lashkari (pilot of Iran's Air Force who was captured in Iraq during the Iran-Iraq war). Hichkas currently lives in London after emigrating to Great Britain in the aftermath of the 2009 Iranian presidential election protests. He is married to the British-based Iranian feminist activist Azadeh Akbari.

In his early years, Hichkas was known for founding a supergroup called 021 (the area code for Tehran). Around 2003, he started his music career in the Vanak neighborhood, participating in Persian free-styling with people who also covered some English language songs in rap battles. Hichkas gained attention when he began rapping in Persian about social problems and the younger generation in Iran. Hichkas' early releases combined traditional Iranian instruments and urban beats to create a hybrid genre, a combination of East and West.

== Discography ==
=== Studio albums ===
- Jangale Asfalt (2006)

The Asphalt Jungle (2006)
#	Title	producer	Time
1	Intro	Mahdyar Aghajani	1:22
2	Dideh va Del	Mahdyar Aghajani	4:51
3	Ekhtelaf	Mahdyar Aghajani	3:42
4	Man Vaistadam	Mahdyar Aghajani	4:06
5	Moghaddameh Ghanoon	Mahdyar Aghajani	0:31
6	Ghanoon	Mahdyar Aghajani	4:10
7	Vatan Parast	Mahdyar Aghajani	4:14
8	Oon Manam	Mahdyar Aghajani	3:39
9	Barpa	Mahdyar Aghajani	3:13
10	Zendan	Mahdyar Aghajani	3:30
11	Dideh va Del - Remix	Mahdyar Aghajani	3:50

- Mojaz (2020)

Mojaz (2020)
#	Title	Producer	Time
1	Rosva	Mahdyar Aghajani	4:40
2	To Koja Boodi?	Mahdyar Aghajani	3:55
3	Sakhte Mosalmoon Boodan	Mahdyar Aghajani	3:15
4	Ghazi Mano Doost Dasht	Mahdyar Aghajani	3:40
5	Man Kiam?	Mahdyar Aghajani	5:54
6	Chera Nemimiri?	Mahdyar Aghajani, Hekmat	4:41
7	Az Ashnayitoon Khoshhalam	Mahdyar Aghajani	4:44
8	Khalafkaraye Asli	Mahdyar Aghajani, Hekmat	4:06
9	Shabi Gorga	Mahdyar Aghajani, Hekmat	5:31
10	Teroreshoon Kon	Mahdyar Aghajani	3:16
11	Jadval o Roya	Mahdyar Aghajani	3:42
12	Sheytoone Mige	Mahdyar Aghajani, Hassan	3:14
13	Ye Maks	Mahdyar Aghajani, Hassan	3:56
14	Ki Mige?	Mahdyar Aghajani	2:44
15	Mahze Mokhalefat	Mahdyar Aghajani	3:21
16	Va Zir	Mahdyar Aghajani	1:44

=== Compilation albums ===
- Anjām Vazife (The Tour of Duty EP) produced by Mahdyar Aghajani (2011)

=== International collaborations ===
- Young N Foolish (featuring Kool G Rap, Reveal, Quf) produced by Mahdyar Aghajani (2012)
- "Long Live Palestine, Part II" (Lowkey featuring Hichkas, Reveal, Dam, Narcy, Eslam Jawaad, Hasan Salaam, and Shadia Mansour) produced by Nutty P (2010)

=== As featured artist ===
- "Boro Jolo" (with Reza Pishro) (2007)
- "Divoone" (with Reza Pishro) (2007)
- "Long Live Palestine, Part II" (Lowkey featuring Hichkas, Reveal, Dam, Narcy, Eslam Jawaad, Hasan Salaam, and Shadia Mansour) produced by Nutty P (2010)
- "Chera Badi?" (with Zedbazi) (Why Are You So Mean?) (2012) produced by Alireza JJ
- "Chi Shenidi?" (with Fadaei) (2012)

=== Single ===
==== 2024 ====
- Dishab Ye Basiji Koshtam - (I killed a basiji last night)
- Rooye Jenazat Miraghsam - (I dance on your corpse)

== Filmography ==
- Trip e Ma (Our Style) (2004), music video edited by Fred Khoshtinat
- Ye Mosht Sarbaz (A Bunch of Soldiers) (2008), music video directed by Fred Khoshtinat, with guest appearances by Mahdyar Aghajani, Reveal, Reza Pishro, Ali Quf, Atour and Bahram Nouraei. Sections of the video are included in the Cultures of Resistance full-length documentary feature film by Iara Lee.
- No One Knows About Persian Cats (2009) feature film directed by Bahman Ghobadi, which won an Un Certain Regard Special Jury Prize Ex-aequo at the Cannes Film Festival.

== See also ==
- Reza Pishro
- Yas
- Bahram
- Fadaei
- Iranian hip hop
- List of Iranian musicians
- Music of Iran
- Persian pop music
- Rock and alternative music in Iran
