= Reveal (rapper) =

Iranian-born British rapper (born 1983)

- Born: Mehrak Golestan; 29 December 1983 (age 42); Tehran, Iran
- Origin: London, England
- Genres: Hip-hop
- Occupation: Rapper
- Years active: 2000–present
- Website: www.revealpoison.com

Mehrak Golestan (Persian: مهرک گلستان; born 29 December 1983) is an Iranian-born British rapper.

He appeared on the BBC current affairs programme Newsnight on 9 August 2011 discussing the London riots of 2011.

He is the son of Iranian photographers Kaveh Golestan and Hengameh Golestan, and the grandson of writer and film director Ebrahim Golestan.

== Discography ==
=== Extended plays ===
Selected extended plays
#	Title	Date	Artist	Producer
1	"Seven Shades"	2012	Reveal	-

=== Mixtapes ===
Selected mixtapes
#	Title	Date	Artist	Producer
1	"Poisonous Poetry"	2005	Reveal, Poisonous Poets	-
2	"Lost Tapes Vol. 1 (Poison and Other Toxins)"	2011	Reveal	-
3	"Lost Tapes Vol. 2 (Estates and Legacies)"	2011	Reveal	-

=== Singles ===
Selected singles
#	Title	Date	Artist	Producer
1	"Kill 'em With a Pen"	2008	Reveal, 7Khat	-
2	"021LDN"	2011	Reveal	-
3	"I Predict a Riot"	2011	Reveal	-

=== As featured artist ===
Selected appearances
#	Title	Date	Artist	Producer
1	"Tiripe Ma"	2003	Reveal, Hichkas	-
2	"Dideh Va Del"	2006	Reveal, Hichkas, Amin Fooladi, Bidad	-
3	"Vatan Parast"	2006	Reveal, Hichkas	-
4	"Zendan"	2006	Reveal, Hichkas	-
5	"Khatteh Man (Remix)"	2008	Reveal, Erfan, Khashayar, Afra, Mehrad Hidden	-
6	"Long Live Palestine Part 2"	2010	Reveal, Lowkey, Dam, Narcy, Eslam Jawaad, Hichkas, Hasan Salaam, Shadia Mansour	-
7	"Nefrat"	2010	Reveal, Erfan	-
8	"Marjan"	2011	Reveal, Quf	-
9	"Tiripe Ma 2"	2012	Reveal, Hichkas	-
10	"Ki Mige"	2020	Reveal, Hichkas	-

=== Music videos ===
Selected music videos
#	Title	Date	Artist	Producer
1	"Tiripe Ma"	2003	Reveal	-
2	"What Estate R U From"	2007	Reveal	-
3	"West London"	2011	Reveal	-
4	"Neva Blink"	2011	Reveal	-
5	"The Warning"	2012	Reveal	-
6	"7ntro"	2012	Reveal	-

== See also ==
- List of Iranian hip-hop artists
