= Golazin =

Iranian musician and actress

Golazin "Gola"
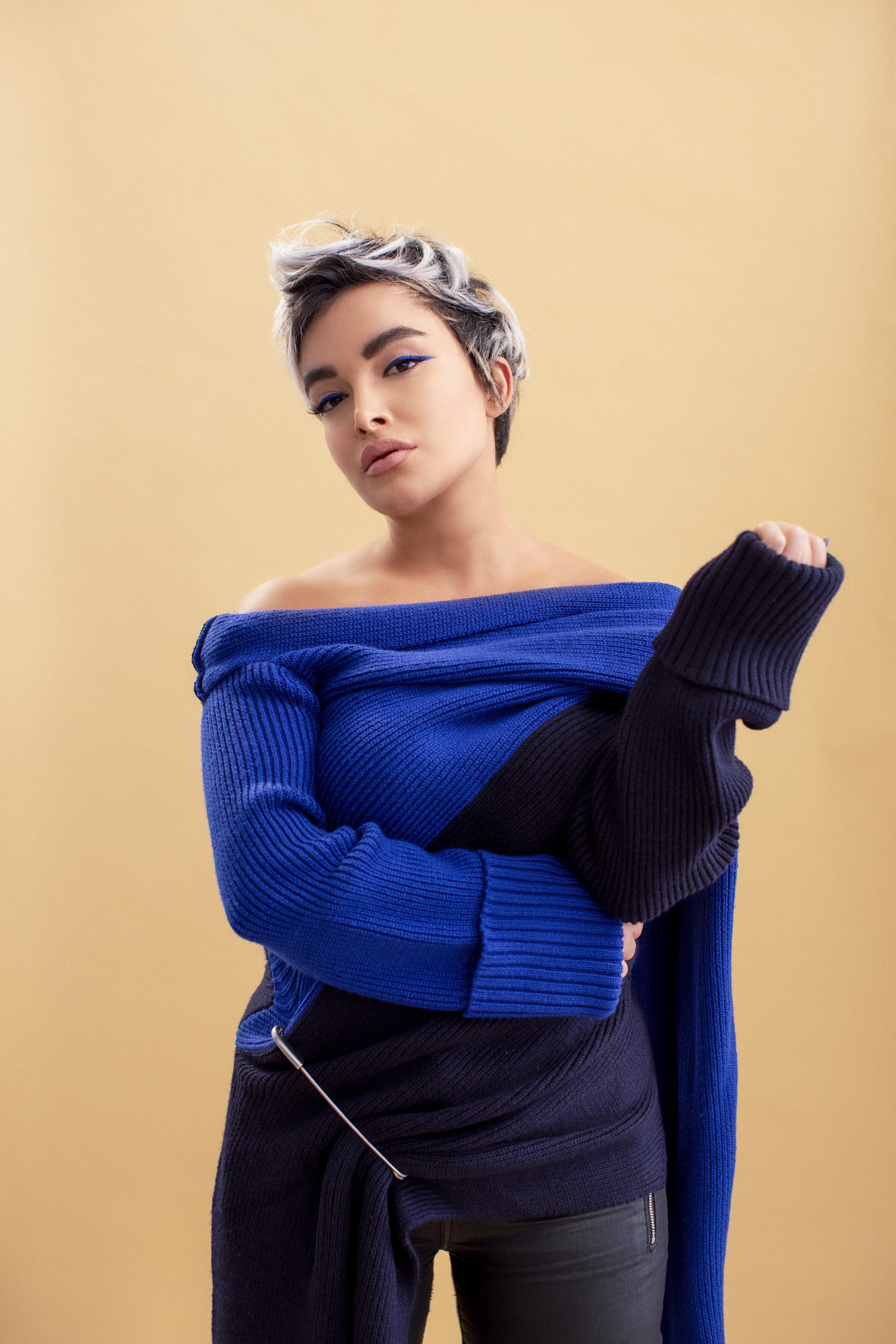
- Gola in 2020

Background information
- Born: Golazin Ardestani; Iran
- Genres: Trap pop, urban
- Occupations: Singer, Actress
- Instruments: Vocals, piano, flute, santur
- Years active: 2016–present
- Label: Zan Recordings

Golazin Ardestani (Persian: گل آذین اردستانی), better known by her stage name Gola, is an Iranian born, British-American singer-songwriter, musicologist, vocalist and actress based in London. She plays piano, santur, dammam (Persian percussion) and the flute.

== Early life ==
Gola grew up in Isfahan, Iran. She studied music composition and performance at Tehran's University of Soureh. In 2011, she moved to London to pursue a master's degree in music psychology at Roehampton University.

== Career ==
When she was 19, Gola joined Iran's first girlband, Orchid, which was only allowed to play before a female audience in Iran because of local laws. She was arrested three times in Iran. Following her tours with Orchid, she honed her own tastes as an artist and garnered a fervent fan base.

The restrictions in place for female singers in Iran, and political unrest, fueled Golazin's decision to move to London in 2011. Her debut single, "Miri", received over 3 million listens on Radio Javan.

In 2018, Gola released the single "The Line", her first track in English. Her singles "Haghame" and "Khodavande Shoma" were streamed millions of times after their release. She released the single "Now You Know" in 2019. She has worked alongside Idan Raichel and Iranian rapper Hossein Tohi. Gola creates music influenced by both Eastern and Western music, with an underlying message of raising awareness of Iran.

== Discography ==
=== Persian singles ===
1. Khoda Danad
2. Eshghe Ariaei
3. Behtarin Abi
4. Khodam Boodam Oonja
5. Raghse Shirin
6. Betars Az Man
7. Khodavanda
8. Khosh Be Halam
9. Haghame
10. Khodavande Shoma

=== English singles ===
1. The Line
2. Now You Know
