= Yas (rapper) =

Iranian rapper (born 1982)

Yas Blessing of Persian Rap
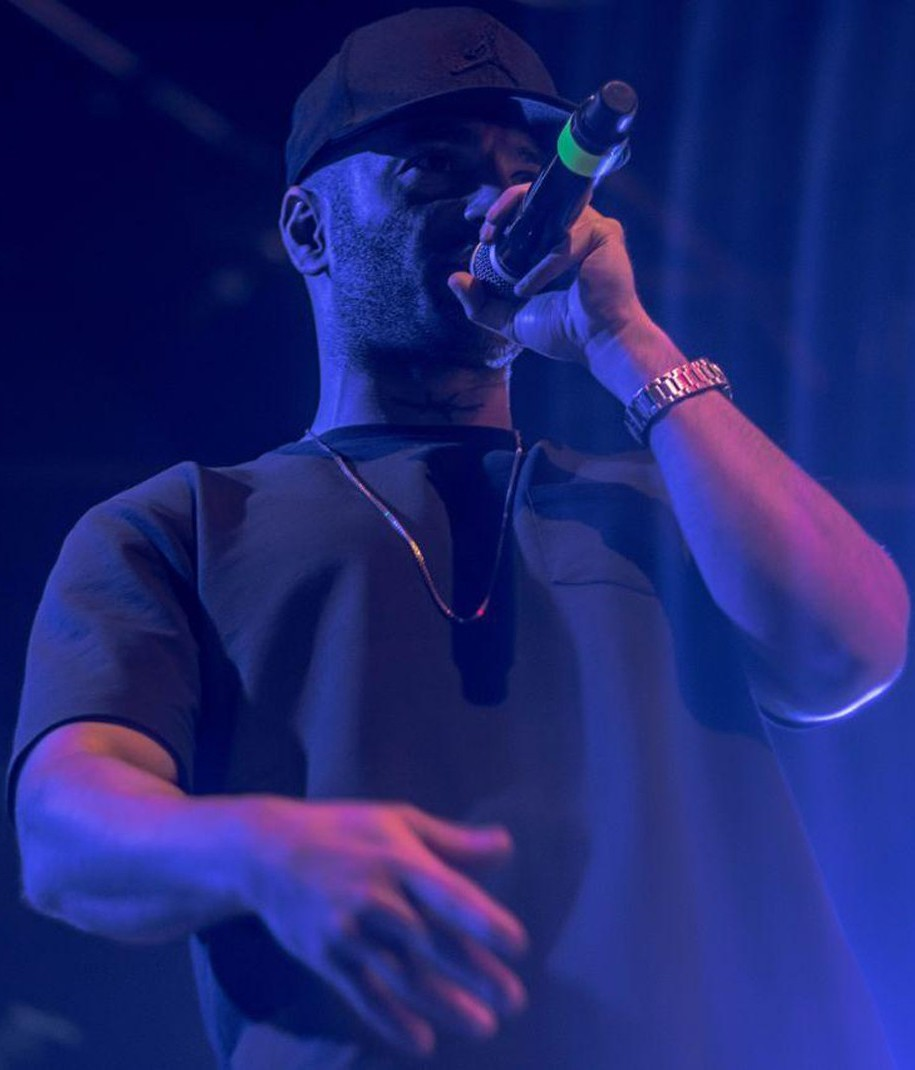
- Yas performing live in Concert in 2018 at Melbourne, Australia

Background information
- Also known as: Yas
- Born: Yaser Bakhtiari; 20 June 1982 (age 44)
- Origin: Iran
- Genres: Rap, Hip Hop
- Occupations: Rapper, Songwriter, Musician
- Years active: 2000–present
- Labels: Faryas, Yastunes
- Website: Yastunes

Yaser Bakhtiari (Persian: یاسر بختیاری, born 1982) better known by his stage name Yas /jɑːs/ (یاس), is an Iranian rapper. He wears a Faravahar pendant, a symbol of Iranian nationalism and Zoroastrianism.

On 21 December 2011 Yas was chosen by the voters as the Artist of the Week in MTV IGGY Entitled Tehran’s Hard-Hitting MC.

Yas is one of the founders of Persian rap, and in 2013 he became the first Iranian rapper to be allowed by the Islamic Republic to legally perform in Iran.

== Early life ==
Yas developed an interest in hip hop music during his teenage years. According to biographical accounts, he was introduced to rap music at the age of 14 after his father returned from a business trip to Germany with recordings including a Tupac album and other hip-hop music.

Following the death of his father, Yas took on greater family responsibilities and left his plans for higher education in order to work and contribute financially to his household. During this period, he began writing poetry, which later developed into songwriting and rap lyrics, marking the beginning of his career in music.

== Music career ==
Yas started his work after the 2003 Bam earthquake. Devastated by the disaster, it was then, that he wrote his first song "Bam". This was the beginning of his rapping career. Yas in 2006 made a song called CD Ro Beshkan (Break The Disk) which was written about actress Zahra Amir Ebrahimi in Iran who was the victim of a Sex scandal tape. The scandal ultimately ended her career. In the song, Yas criticizes the people for playing a role in her demise and asked everyone to stop spreading her shame and to get rid of the footage from their computers and cellphones. The song was listened to and downloaded by millions in Iran alone.

Yas in June 2008 made a song called Hoviate Man [my identity] describing his pride in his Iranian heritage and mention of the controversial 300 film. Yas in 2008 made and wrote a song named "Darkam Kon" (Understand me). Yas's music was a protest against the government and for poverty and people who can't find jobs.

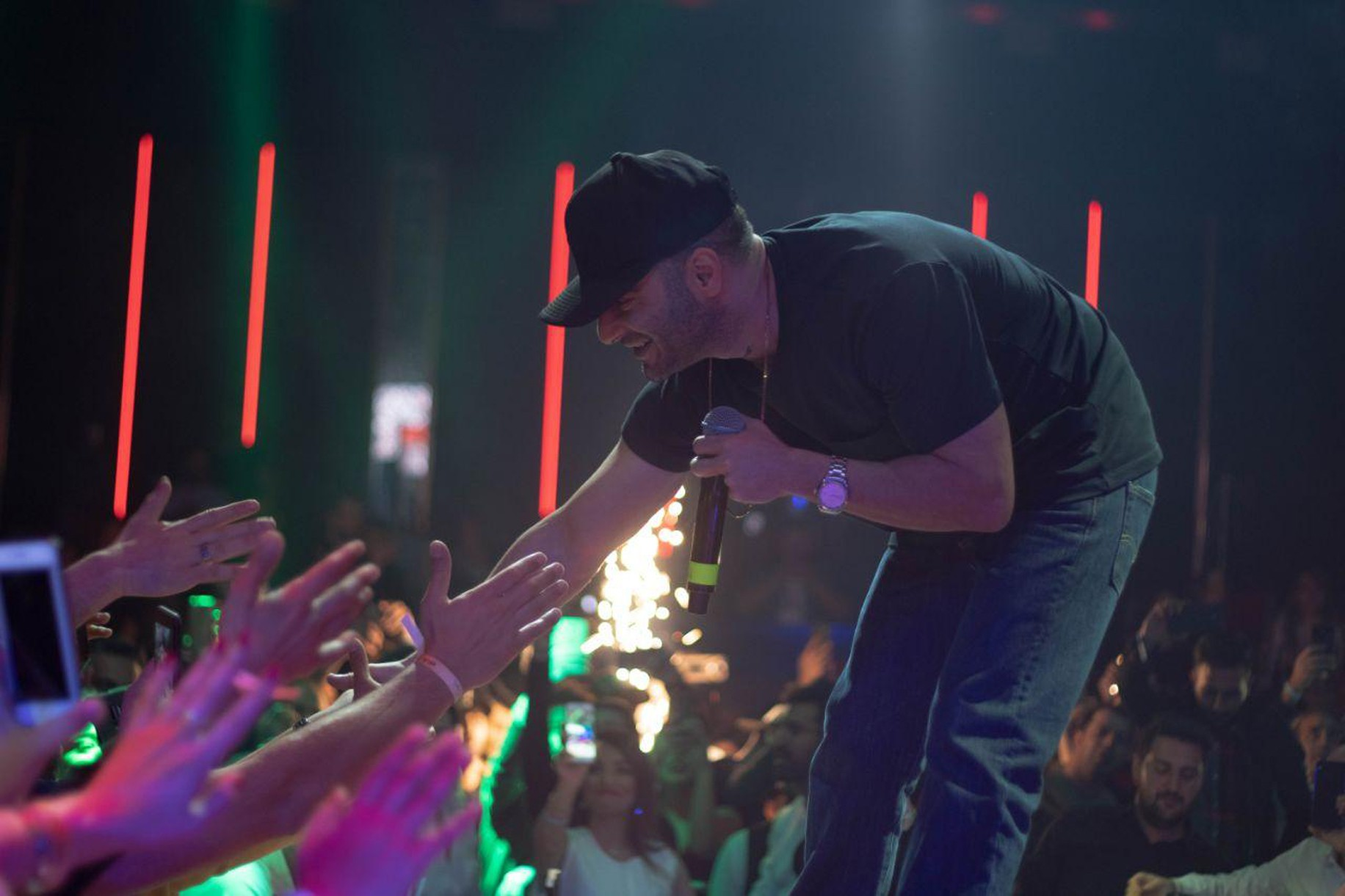
Yas performing in 2018.

In May 2011 Yas made a song called "Az Chi Begam" (What Can I Say) which is a protest song for those schoolchildren who suffered from a fire in addition to injustice and misery, like their fellow countrymen. Yas criticizes the negligence of the Islamic Republic of Iran in providing substandard facilities, in this case, a very old oil burning heater, which caused eight 7-year-old schoolchildren burned in Doroudzan village’s school disaster.

In 2013 he became the first rapper authorized to perform by the Iranian government. In 2014 Yas decided to cooperate with Tech N9ne. The pair are the first rappers from Iran and the United States to work together musically. Their single was titled "The Sound of Unity" which was released along with a Music video.

== Manner ==
Yas, who raps in Persian, states he was heavily influenced as a young man by Tupac Shakur albums brought back to Iran by his father, as well as the Classical Persian poetry especially Rumi. He is one of the few Persian rappers who do not use any swear words in their song Yas theme songs are the social problems. Yas’ accomplishments paved the way for new rappers to perform in Iran.

== Media appearances ==
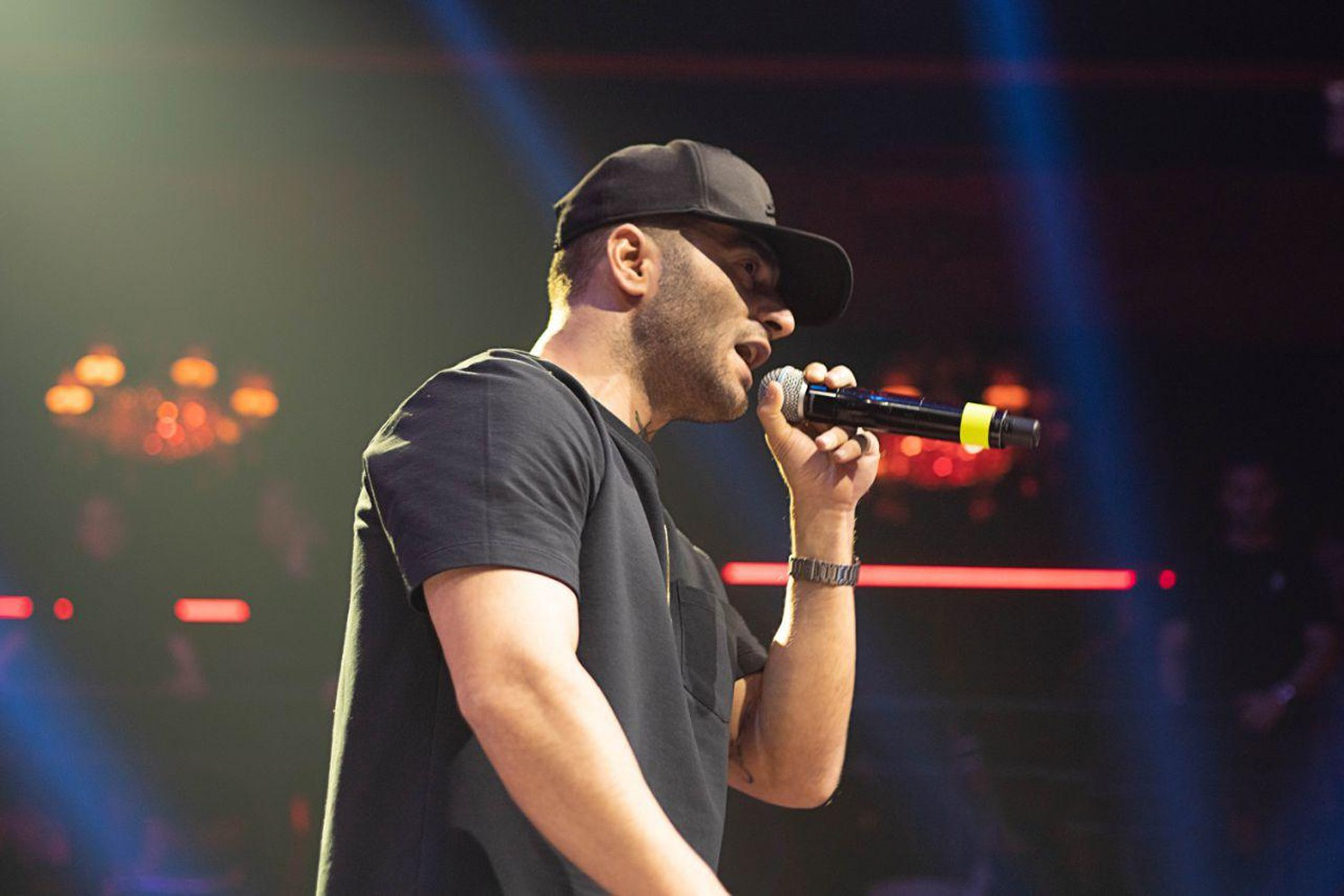
Yas in 2018

Yas signed a contract with an American music publishing company Modiba. IEvergreen Publishing is also the home of the late Tupac Shakur catalog who has granted permission for a mashup song between Yas and Tupac.

== Discography ==
=== Singles ===
Year	Title	English translation / Meaning	Featured artist(s) / Notes
2000	BacheHaye Khiaboon	Street Kids	
2002	Bam	Bam	
2002	Man Khaste am	I Am Tired	
2003	Honey	Honey	
2003	Yek Nafas Begin	Let's Say With One Breath (together)	
2003	Bia To	You Come	Ft Sasan
2003	Daftaram Dastameh	My Notebook Is In My Hand	
2003	Cheshmamouno Baz Konim	We Should Open Our Eyes	Ft N.I.M.I
2004	Raz	Mystery	Ft Sasan
2004	Setare Ghotbi	Polar Star	
2004	Dardo Del	Chat	
2004	Donyaye Bi Rahm	The Ruthless World	
2005	Zehi Eshgh	Welldone Love	Ft Sara Naeini
2005	Che Roozaye Sakhti Raft	What Difficult Days Went By	
2006	Bi To Dige Na Aslan	Without You, Not At All	
2006	Na Aslan	Not At All	
2006	Cd Ro Beshkan	Break The Cd	
2006	Bayad Betoonim	We Must Be Able To	
2007	Hoviate Man	My Identity	
2007	Solh Toei	Peace Be Upon You	
2007	Be Omide Iran	In The Hope Of Iran	Ft Rastin
2007	Bezarin Bokoshamesh	Let Me Kill It	
2008	Toos Rap	Iran's Rap	
2008	Sakhte	It's Hard	Ft Nima Allameh Dahr
2008	Darkam Kon	Understand Me	
2008	Be Donya Khosh Oomadi	Welcome To The World	
2008	Haminja Piyadeh Misham	I'll Get Out Right Here	
2008	Tamoomesh Kon	Stop It	
2009	Bia Kenaram Beshin To	Come Sit Next To Me	Ft Sasan
2009	Goftam Naro	I Said Don't Go	Ft Reza Sadeghi
2009	Delet Daryast	Your Heart Is [Like] The Sea	
2009	To Marizi	You're Crazy	Ft Xaniar Khosravi & Sirvan Khosravi
2009	Ba Man Bash	Be With Me	
2009	Yadet Nareh	Don't Forget	Ft Majid Ghafouri
2009	Entezar	Wait	
2009	Marham	Salve	
2010	Nisti	You're Not	Ft Aamin Malek
2010	Bekhatere Man	For The Sake Of Me	
2010	Ghesseye Zirzamin	The Story Of The Undergrounds	
2010	Vaghte Tolue Yas	Yas Rising Time	
2010	Sheykhe Hilegar		
2011	Sarbaze Vatan	Soldier of the Homeland	
2011	Az Chi Begam	What Can I Say	
2012	Man Mijangam	I'll Fight On	
2012	Vaghte Raftan	Time To Leave	Ft Aamin Malek
2012	Trash The Club		
2013	Faryas (Faryad E Yas)	Shout of Yas	
2013	Amen		Ft Aamin Malek
2014	Man Edameh Midam	I'll Continue	
2014	Sound Of Unity (Sedaye Ettehad)	Sound Of Unity	Ft Tech N9ne (Aaron Dontez Yates)
2014	Do Do Ta Chahar Ta	2×2=4	
2014	Vasiat Nameh	Wills	
2014	Zende Bad Iran	Long Live Iran	
2015	Free Style (Live Shomal)	Norouz 94 Or Dar Rah Shomal	
2015	Bad Shodam	I've Become Bad	
2015	Mosafer	Passenger	
2015	Hamechi Dorost Mishe	Everything Will Be Fine	
2015	Charsoo	Crossroad	
2015	Dige Nist	No More She Is Here	
2015	Speak		Ft John D & Arsha Michaels
2016	Barcode	Song Barcode Movie	
2016	Boghz Yani	Spite Means	Ft Aamin Malek
2016	Nameyi Be Farzand	Letter To A Child	
2017	Sarkoob	Suppression (Long Version)	
2018	Bande Naaf Ta Khatte Saaf	From Cord To Smooth Line	Ft Moer
2019	Esalat	Gentility	Ft Moer
2019	Sefareshi	Commissioned	
2020	Agah	Aware	Ft Moer
2020	Lal	Mute	
2022	Khanevadegi 2	Famililly 2	
2022	Beem	Fear	
2025	Baaq	Garden	
2026	Separ	Shield	Ft. Reza Pishro & Tech N9ne

==== Bad shodam (I become bad) ====
The song “Bad Shodam” (meaning “| Became Bad” in English) is about the influence of the environment on human actions like domino effect, highlighting how an unhealthy environment by society and culture can transform even good people into bad ones.

Yas describes his transformation from someone who used to help everyone into a cold person without moral principles. He also emphasizes, through the story of his girlfriend’s betrayal, that her pride and showing off her fame were the result of her betrayal.

Still, Yas doesn’t try to excuse what he’s become. He owns it honestly, without pretending he’s right.

The song “Bad Shodam” became one of the most popular Persian rap tracks. Its storytelling, emotional delivery, and message were highly praised, and many people could relate to the song

==== Beem (fear) ====
"Beem" is Yas's first political single. "Beem" has been referred to as Yas's best work and one of the best Persian rap songs. The structure and framework of the song closely resemble that of the song "Sarkoob" (another Yas's song).It consists of 5 verses and 3 different beats, with a duration of approximately 12 minutes.

For the first time in persian rap, Yas blended classical Persian poetry with modern music. Lyrically, the song marked a significant leap compared to his previous works. The use of literary devices such as metaphor, simile, and wordplay increased, and the range of both modern and classical vocabulary expanded, resulting in a more complex and richer poetic composition.

The song's themes are mostly political, protesting Government of Iran and the censorship and propaganda surrounding Persian rap. However, it also includes social elements such as forced migration, public ignorance, and normalization the protests. Yas criticized the undue attention given to the opinions and statements of certain figures and media outlets, condemning public gullibility and the failure to grasp the truth. He also strongly criticized the political views of the "Meltefat" group. Additionally, the song references events such as Ukraine International Airlines Flight 752, 2021 Iranian presidential election, and 2019–2020 Iranian protests.

The song was widely acclaimed by listeners and critics, topping various polls as the best "Persian rap song." Released before Mahsa Amini protests, some saw its lyrics as prophetic due to their relevance. Pouya Poutk, who had previously criticized Yas for being "conservative" and "cowardly," praised his courage for releasing a "political song in Iran." However, the track also faced criticism. Amir Tataloo criticized the mix-mastering, Yas's delivery, and the song's resemblance to his own works. Sepehr Khalseh also criticized the complexity and loss of meaning in the rhymes, giving it a 7 out of 10.

== Music videos ==
Title	English title / Translation	Featured artist(s) / Notes
Bezarin Bokoshamesh	Let Me Kill Him	
ba To bi Dige Na Aslan	Never without you	Ft Aamin
Raaz (Mano To)	The secret between me and you	Ft Sasan
Ghesseye Zirzamin	Underground Story	
Bekhatere Man	For my sake	
Sarbaze Vatan	Homeland Soldier	
Trash The Club		Ft Dj Aligator & Al Agami
Az Chi Begam	What Can I Say	
Vaghte Raftan	Time To Leave	Ft Aamin
Faryas (Faryad E Yas)	Shout Of Yas	
Sound Of Unity	Sedaye Ettehad	Ft Tech N9ne
Mosafer	Passenger	
Hamechi Dorost Mishe	Everything Will Be Fine	
Nameyi Be Farzand	Letter To A Child	
Bande Naaf Ta Khatte Saaf	From An Umbilical Cord To A Smooth Line	Ft Moer
Sefareshi	Special Request	
Agah	Aware	Ft Moer
Khanevadegi 2	Family 2	Ft various artists

== Concert ==
Country	Cities / Venues
United States	University of Michigan; San Francisco; California; Los Angeles; Yale University
United Arab Emirates	Dubai
Canada	Toronto
England	London
Australia	Melbourne
Turkey	Istanbul
Germany	Hamburg; Cologne

== Filmography ==
Title	Type
Rock On	Documentary
Paparazzi	Documentary
Raad, A Woman's Story	Movie
Taraneh	Song (Documentary)

== See also ==
- List of Iranian hip-hop artists
- Iranian hip hop
