= Erfan (rapper) =

Iranian rapper, songwriter, producer, and label owner

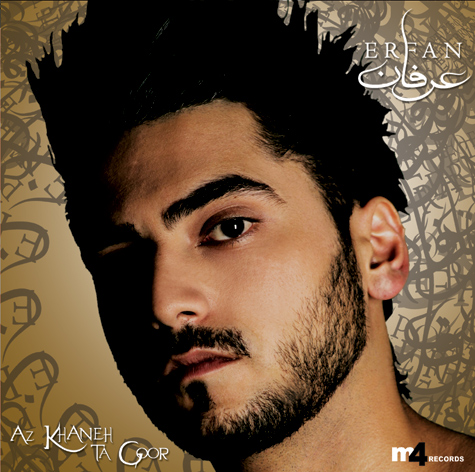

Background information
- Born: Erfan Hajrasooli Ha; 3 August 1983 (age 43); Isfahan, Iran
- Origin: Iran
- Genres: Hip hop, Iranian hip hop, trap
- Occupations: Rapper, songwriter, singer, record producer, record executive
- Instrument: Vocals
- Labels: Avang Music, Paydar, RadioJavan
- Website: www.i-erfan.us

Erfan Hajrasuliha (Persian: عرفان‌ حاج رسولی ها), known professionally as Erfan Paydar (Persian: عرفان پایدار), is an Iranian rapper, singer, songwriter, producer, and label owner. He is one of the pioneers of Persian Rap. Erfan's "Az Khaneh Ta Goor" (Persian: از خانه تا گور) was one of the first professionally produced Iranian rap albums, released by a major record label. He is nicknamed the "Sun of Persian rap” (Persian: خورشید رپ پارس) by his fans. He is the founder of the label Paydar. He has a collaboration with Yas, Ho3ein, Koorosh and so many Iranian artists . His views are a result of his personal experiences and that is reflected in his poems. His songs provide a mixture of commentary on daily life as well politics, poetry, and social issues.

In addition to Az Khaneh Ta Goor, Erfan has, to date, released more albums including, Hamishegi, Khodafezi and Ayatoltrap (with Gdaal), Angizeh accompanied by Dara Paydar and Khorshid Vol. 1 (Tolou).

Erfan took a hiatus from music for two years following the release of Khodafezi. According to Erfan, the reasons for his farewell are fully stated in this album. Then, in 2018, he made his return with the release of the single "Khosh Oomadi" featuring Canis.

In addition to music, Erfan has worked in other fields including directing, photography, podcast production (Nomadland Podcast), establishing real estate Paydar Fit and Cuché sustainable apparel brands.

== Biography ==
=== Life and career ===
Erfan was born in Isfahan, Iran, on 3 August 1983. He ended his career after the "Khodahafezi" (meaning Goodbye) album was released in 2016 but he returned to Iranian hip-hop in 2018 with the single song "Khosh Omadi" (meaning welcome back).

=== Work to date ===
Erfan released his debut album Az Khaneh Ta Goor (From the Cradle to the Grave) in 2007. Erfan's focus on his first album was to introduce Iranian hip hop to a wider audience and detail some of his frustrations with Iranian music. The album was named after a poem by Molaana Rumi about death. The album encompasses some of his thoughts as a traveling immigrant from his home country Iran. On 1 September 2011 Erfan released the single, 'Donya Male Maast" featuring Sami Beigi, produced and composed by Los Angeles-based composer/producer Naveed Dezfoli.

=== Az Khaneh Ta Goor (2007) ===
On 24 July 2007, Erfan released his first album. Earlier events had provided inspiration for Erfan's first album. Erfan was briefly arrested and jailed in 2002. "Sad Ghasam" was featured on Erfan's debut album, Az Khaneh Ta Goor.

=== Musical style and influence ===
Erfan has said that "many old school/new school musicians and many old school/new school Iranian poets" have influenced him in his style. In his interview with Radio Javan he names some of his influences as traditional Iranian poets such as Omar Khayyam, Hafez and Saddi Shirazi and more recent Iranian poets such as Sohrab Sepehri and Parvin E'tesami. He also mentions traditional Iranian music and names singers Dariush and Googoosh as well as American rappers Tupac Shakur, Nas and Mos Def.

=== Social causes ===
In 2007, Nouraei collaborated on a public service announcement for the Persian American Cancer Institute. In July 2009, following the 2009 Iranian presidential election and the protests that followed, he released the song Tasmim (Decision), which addressed the post-election events and expressed themes of sorrow and frustration, as well as support for the continuation of the protest movement. He also expressed support for the Iranian Green Movement through his Facebook page.(subscription required)

== Albums ==
Year	Album
2007	Az Khaneh Ta Goor
2010	Hamishegi
2016	Khodafezi
2018	Ayatol Trap
2020	Angizeh
2022	Nur
2024	Khorshid Vol. 1 (Tolou)
