= 2017–2018 Iranian protests =

Series of demonstrations in Iran beginning on 28 December 2017

- Part of the 2017–2021 Iranian protests
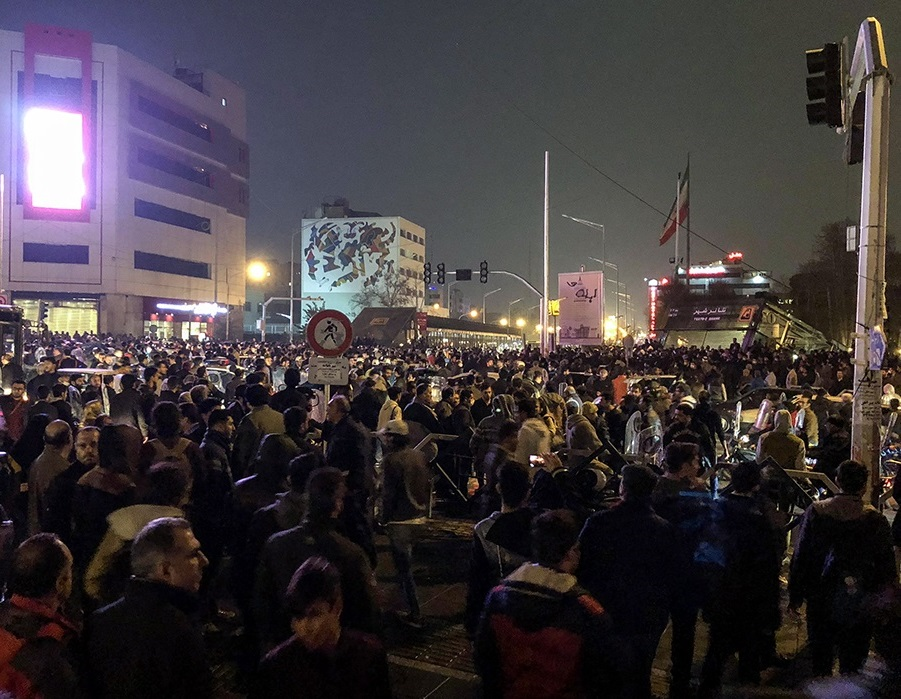
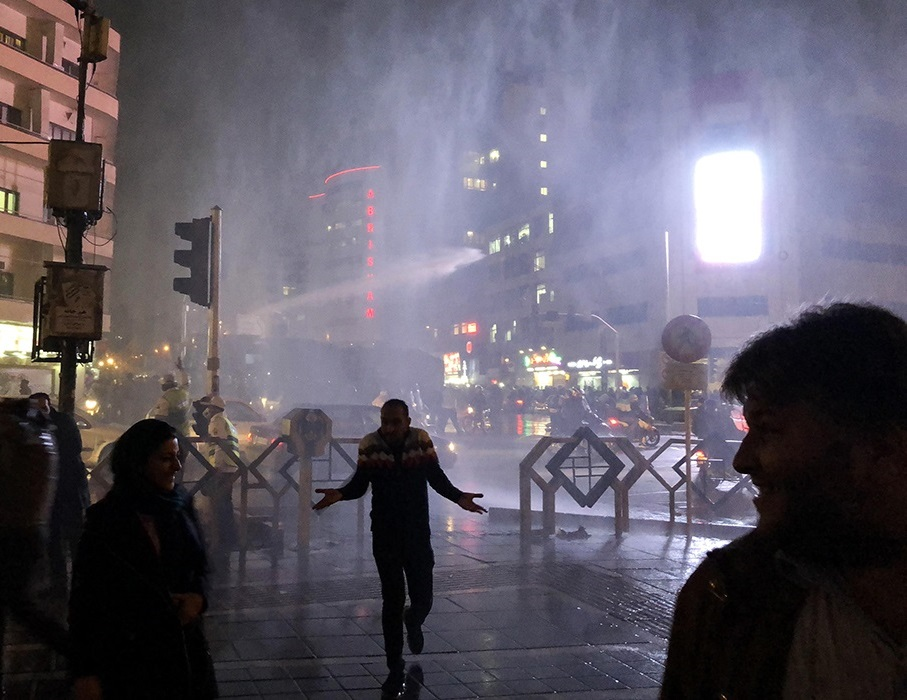
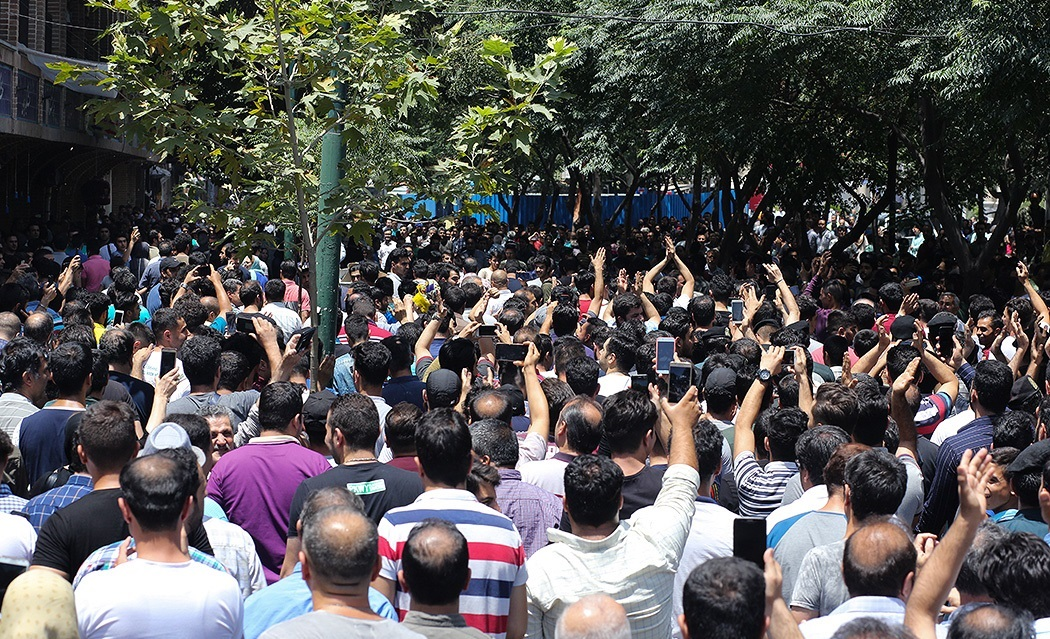
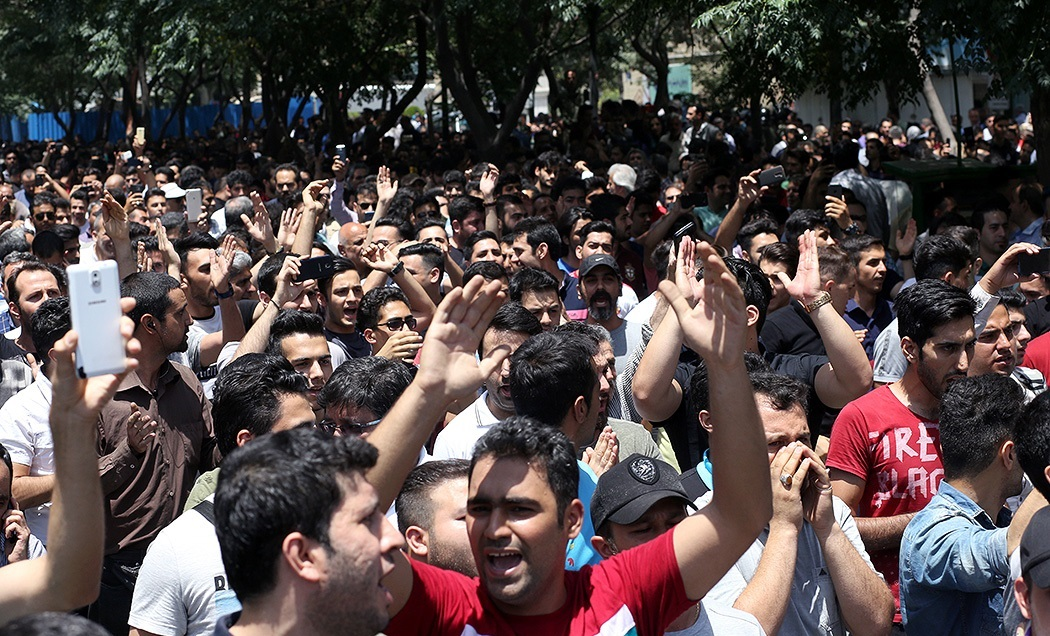
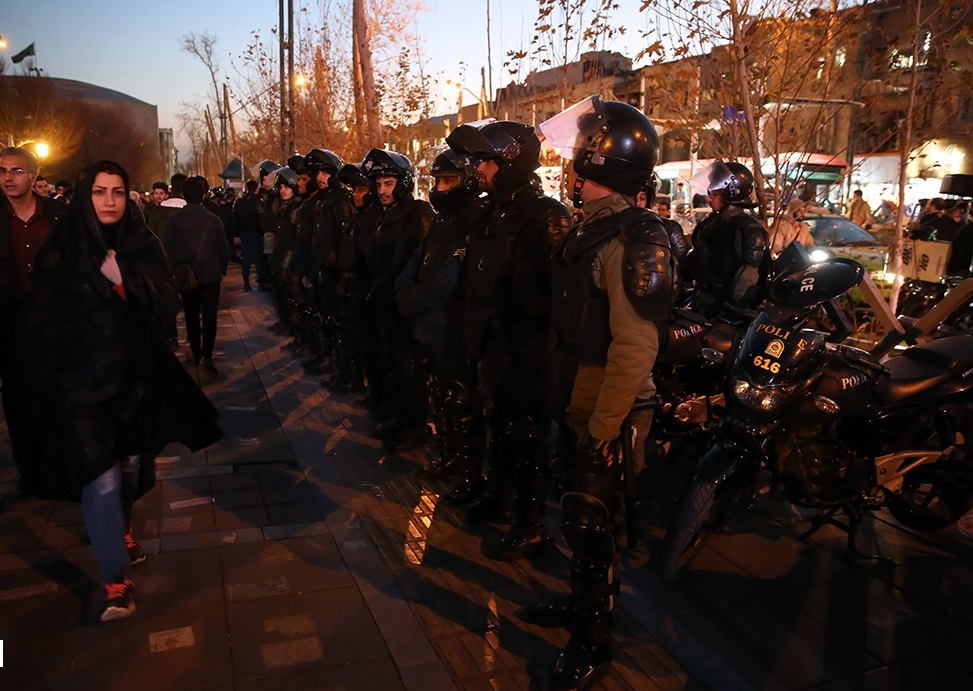
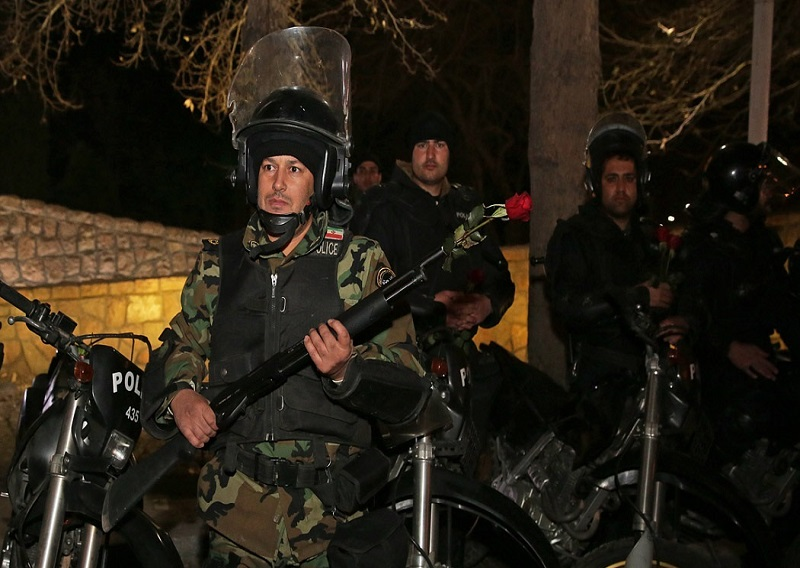
- Date: 28 December 2017 – 7 January 2018 (clashes also occurred later in 2018)
- Location: Iran
- Caused by: Economic hardships; Government corruption; Opposition to Iranian involvement in regional conflicts; Opposition to the Iranian government; Autocratic Government of Ali Khamenei; 2016 Cyrus the Great Revolt; Mandatory hijab law since 1979; Human rights violations; Passing of the Law of "confrontation with human-rights violations and USA adventuresome and terrorist measures in the region"
- Goals: Social and economic stability; Greater social, economic and political equality; Removal of Ali Khamenei
- Methods: Demonstrations, riots, civil disobedience, strikes
- Result: Protests quelled by government forces; Girls of Enghelab Street demonstrations against mandatory hijab, leading to a surge of popular opinion against mandatory hijab in Iran and the 2017–2019 Iranian protests against compulsory hijab; Continued rise of anti-government sentiment in Iran, eventually escalating into further protests in 2018 and the 2019–2020 Iranian protests

Parties
Protestors (Pahlavi Iran) Monarchist	Iranian government

Lead figures
No centralized leadership	Ali Khamenei; Hassan Rouhani

Number
Tens of thousands (domestic); Thousands (international)	Tens of thousands of law enforcement and military personnel

Casualties and losses
23 or 25 killed 4,972 people arrested	1 police killed (per Iranian state media)

Casualties
- Deaths: 24 to 26 protesters: Up to 5 died in custody; 1 law enforcement officer
- Arrested: ≈ 7,000+

Public protests took place in several cities in Iran beginning on 28 December 2017 and continued into early 2018, sometimes called the Dey protests. The first protest took place in Mashhad, Iran's second-largest city by population, initially focused on the economic policies of the country's government; as protests spread throughout the country, their scope expanded to include political opposition to the theocratic government of Iran and its longtime Supreme Leader, Ali Khamenei. The Iranian public showcased their fury in the protests with a wide repertoire of chants aimed at the regime and its leadership. According to The Washington Post, protesters' chants and attacks on government buildings upended a system that had little tolerance for dissent, with some demonstrators even shouting "Death to the dictator!"—referring to Supreme Leader Ayatollah Ali Khamenei—and asking security forces to join them.

The protests marked the most intense domestic challenge to the Iranian government since the 2009 presidential election protests. The year 2018 hosted the most serious and biggest opposition demonstrations since 2009, shaking the very pillars of this regime. However, these protests differ from the Green movement in participants, causes, goals, and chants. Unlike 2009, the 2017–2018 protests remain leaderless and disorganized. While some analysts suggest the protests are a result of unfavorable economic policies adopted by the administration of Iranian President Hassan Rouhani, others say that dissatisfaction with the theocratic regime and the Supreme Leader are the actual causes of the unrest. Rouhani acknowledged on 8 January 2018 that "people had economic, political and social demands".

According to Iranian authorities, protests turned violent in some parts of the country, and Iranian state television reported that the protesters attacked police stations and military personnel and installations, and started fires. As of 2 January 2018, at least twenty-one protesters and two security force members had been killed. Additionally, 3,700 demonstrators were arrested according to Mahmoud Sadeghi, a reformist lawmaker from Tehran, though official figures were much lower. On 5 January 2018, four special rapporteurs of the Office of the United Nations High Commissioner for Human Rights urged the Iranian government to acknowledge and respect rights of protesters and end its blocking of the Internet.

In a backlash against the protests, thousands of government supporters staged pro-government rallies in more than a dozen cities across Iran.

== Background ==
The current Iranian regime came into power following the 1979 Iranian Revolution, which saw the Pahlavi dynasty overthrown in favor of a theocratic Islamic Republic led by Supreme Leader Ruhollah Khomeini.

Since 1989, Ali Khamenei has ruled Iran as Supreme Leader, making him the second-longest serving head of state in the Middle East (after Oman's Sultan Qaboos), as well as the second-longest serving Iranian leader of the last century, after Shah Mohammad Reza Pahlavi.

The Iranian president Hassan Rouhani, who was re-elected in 2017, had promised many changes such as a richer economy and open foreign policy, but he has little power to change compared to Khamenei in the Iranian government.

In 2006, following international concerns regarding the government's nuclear program, a comprehensive, international sanctions regime was imposed on Iran. In 2015, Iran negotiated a deal with the great powers of the world in exchange for economic relief. Many Iranians hoped relief from sanctions would result in economic prosperity; however benefits have not reached the average Iranian. Instead, the benefit from sanctions relief mostly went to state firms and Setad controlled by Supreme Leader Ali Khamenei, estimated by Reuters at $95 billion in 2013. In 2017, according to the Iranian Chamber of Commerce, 33% of Iranians lived below the poverty line, and the gap between the rich and poor has deepened. CNN's Hamid Panah argued that these distributional developments in the economy helped stoke the protests. Recent economic hardships have appeared to incite economic protests and shine light on government corruption.

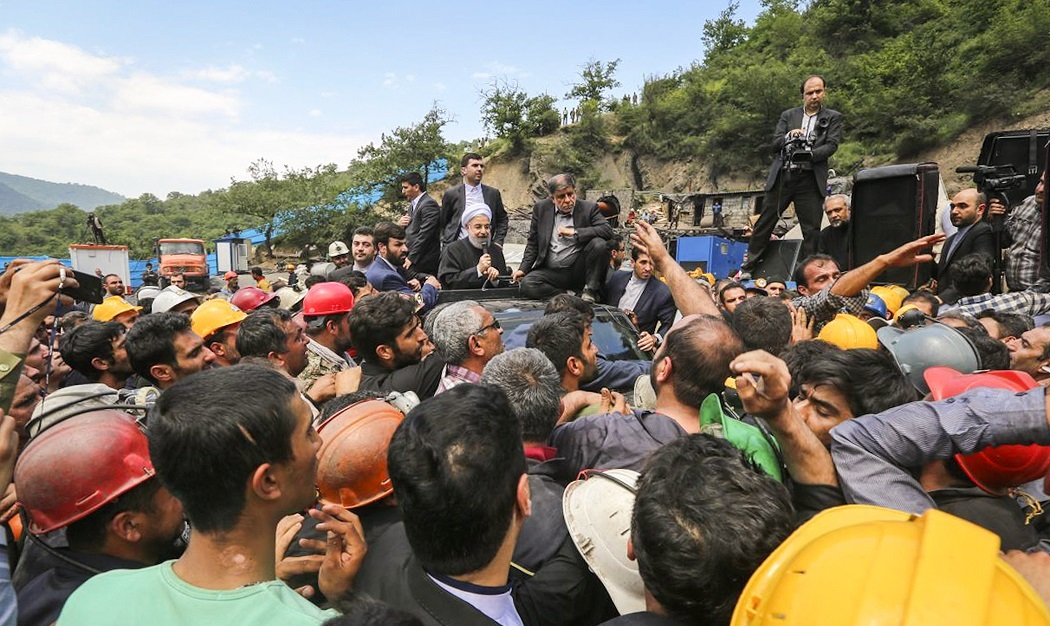
President Hassan Rouhani between Yurt coal mine workers who protested to the government's lack of management

"The initial spark for the protests was a sudden jump in food prices. It is believed that hard-line opponents of Rouhani instigated the first demonstrations in the conservative city of Mashhad in eastern Iran, trying to direct public anger at the president. But as protests spread from town to town, the backlash turned against the entire ruling class."

— Associated Press, 6 January

In order to deflect criticism about the economy, Rouhani had been complaining for several weeks about government money going to religious institutions, which are seen as the power base of the hardliners; according to international media reports, analysts believe that hardliners started the protests as a means to embarrass Rouhani. For many Iranians, development had been slow despite the president's promise to restore the economy.

Protesters registered their opposition to cuts to fuel and cash subsidies, contained in the 2018 budget proposal unveiled in mid-December, which caused widespread anger, with the hashtag #pashimanam ("we regret" [i.e., we regret our vote for Rouhani]) going viral across the country. The generous government funding of the Revolutionary Guards remained unaffected, and there were large increases for religious foundations, which are not required to declare how they spend their funds, and are "tied closely to powerful clerics and often serve as machines for patronage and propaganda to build support for their authority." Furthermore, protesters sought an explanation as to why the government had spent a lot of money elsewhere in the Middle East.

The 2017-2018 protests were the largest protests in Iran since the 2009 Iranian presidential election protests.

== Timeline ==
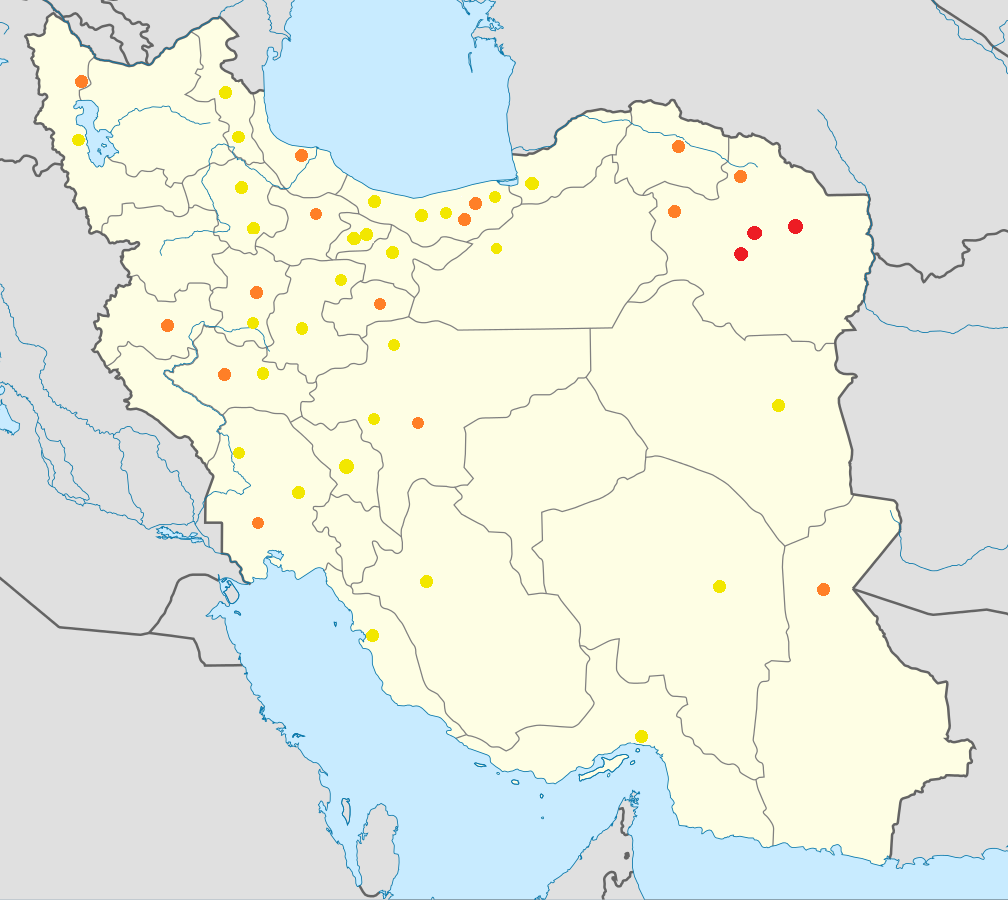
Cities by day first affected by protests: Red: 28 December Orange: 29 December Yellow: 30 December

The protests began in Mashhad on 28 December 2017, and spread to over 140 cities in every province in Iran over a two-week period.. The demonstrations were started by crowds protesting across Iran, including in Mashhad, the second-most populous city. Protests spread to over 70 towns and cities, including Nishapur, Kashan, Kerman, Kermanshah, Kashmar, Rasht, Isfahan, Arak, Bandar Abbas, Ardabil, Qazvin, Hamedan, Sari, Babol, Amol, Shahinshahr, Shahrekord, Shiraz, Khorramabad, Zanjan, Gorgan, Zahedan, Urmia, Dorud, Yazd and Shahrud. According to CNBC, there was widespread protest in 80 cities in Iran.

In some demonstrations, protestors provocatively chanted "Reza Shah, bless your soul", a reference to Reza Shah, the leader of Iran during 1925–41 and founder of the Pahlavi dynasty that was deposed in the 1979 revolution that led to establishment of the current government. Protestors also shouted slogans praising the (deceased) deposed shah Mohammad Reza Pahlavi, and his son and former heir-apparent, the exiled Reza Pahlavi, Crown Prince of Iran. The protesters called for Khamenei to step down, as well as tore down and set fire to posters of Khamenei in Tehran. Protesters also shouted: "Khamenei, shame on you, leave the country alone!" and "death to the dictator". Protesters also chanted "People are paupers while the mullahs live like gods."

=== December 2017–January 2018 ===
The protests in Iran erupted on 28 December 2017. Several crowds were seen protesting across Iran, including in Mashhad, the second most populous city, as well as a several hundred person protest in Tehran, the capital. There were also protests in Neyshabour, Kashmar, Yazd and Shahroud. The protests were allegedly organised on social media messaging apps. Crowds were seen chanting "We don't want an Islamic Republic!", "death to Rouhani", as well as "death to the dictator".

The protests were initially for economic woes, against the high price of goods and commodities, but has "quickly changed" to protesting Iranian involvement in the Middle East, and the government itself.

Demonstrations continued on Friday past sunset. Protests spread to several major cities including Rasht, Isfahan, Ahvaz, Qom, Sari, Zahedan, and Qazvin. A small number of people were arrested in Tehran.

On 30 December the protests escalated, as three were killed and others wounded in shooting by Revolutionary Guards during night protests in central Iran. As Saturday coincided with the anniversary of 30 December 2009 pro-government rally in Iran, some 4000 people attended a pro-government rally in Tehran. According to state television, pro-government rallies were held in 1200 towns and cities in all. At the same time, anti-government riots spread to Tehran for the first time, where students in Tehran University chanted anti-government slogans before getting dispersed by riot police. Posters of Khamenei were torn down at Tehran University. Internet access was shut down in parts of the country, including many areas in Tehran.

Iran's interior minister Abdolreza Rahmani Fazli warned that those who "disrupt the order and break the law must be responsible for their behavior and pay the price". Rahmani Fazli said in a statement on state television that "fear and terror will definitely be confronted." VOA Persian's service identified the victims as Hamzeh Lashni and Hossein Reshno after a reporter spoke to the victims' families.

Anti-government protests continued for a fourth day. Some scattered demonstrations in Tehran and families of arrested protesters gathering outside Evin prison. 200 people were arrested in Tehran on Sunday, and another 10 were arrested in West Azerbaijan province.

Rouhani, in his first comments after days of anti-government demonstrations said people have the right to protest but stressed violence, vandalism and inflammatory political slogans must be avoided as these only worsen the conditions of the people.

According to Iran's State media accounts, which could not be confirmed by independent sources, some armed demonstrators tried to take control of police stations and military bases but were repulsed by security forces. It was confirmed that 10 people had been killed during clashes Sunday night.

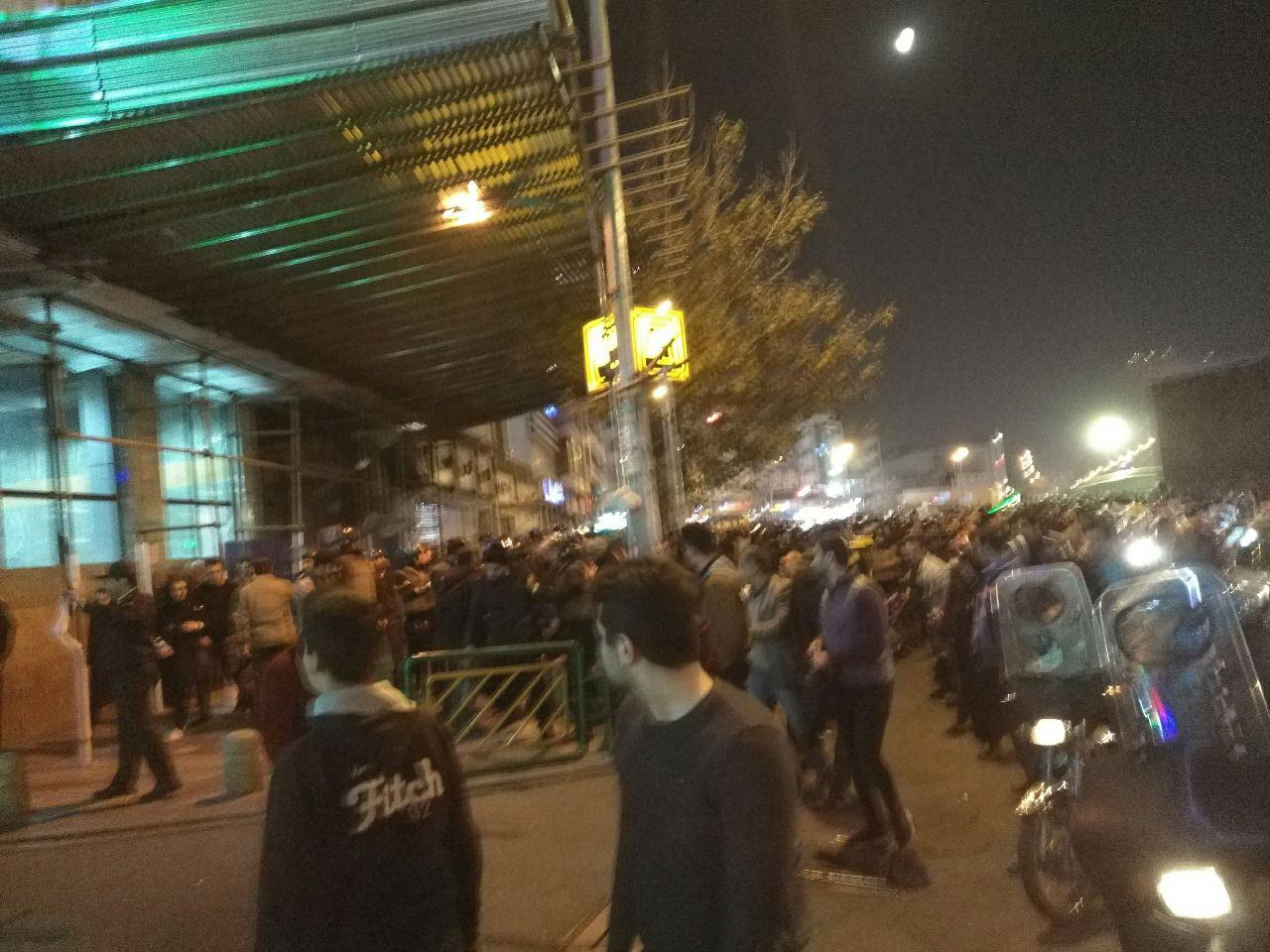
Anti-government protests in Tehran, 31 December 2017

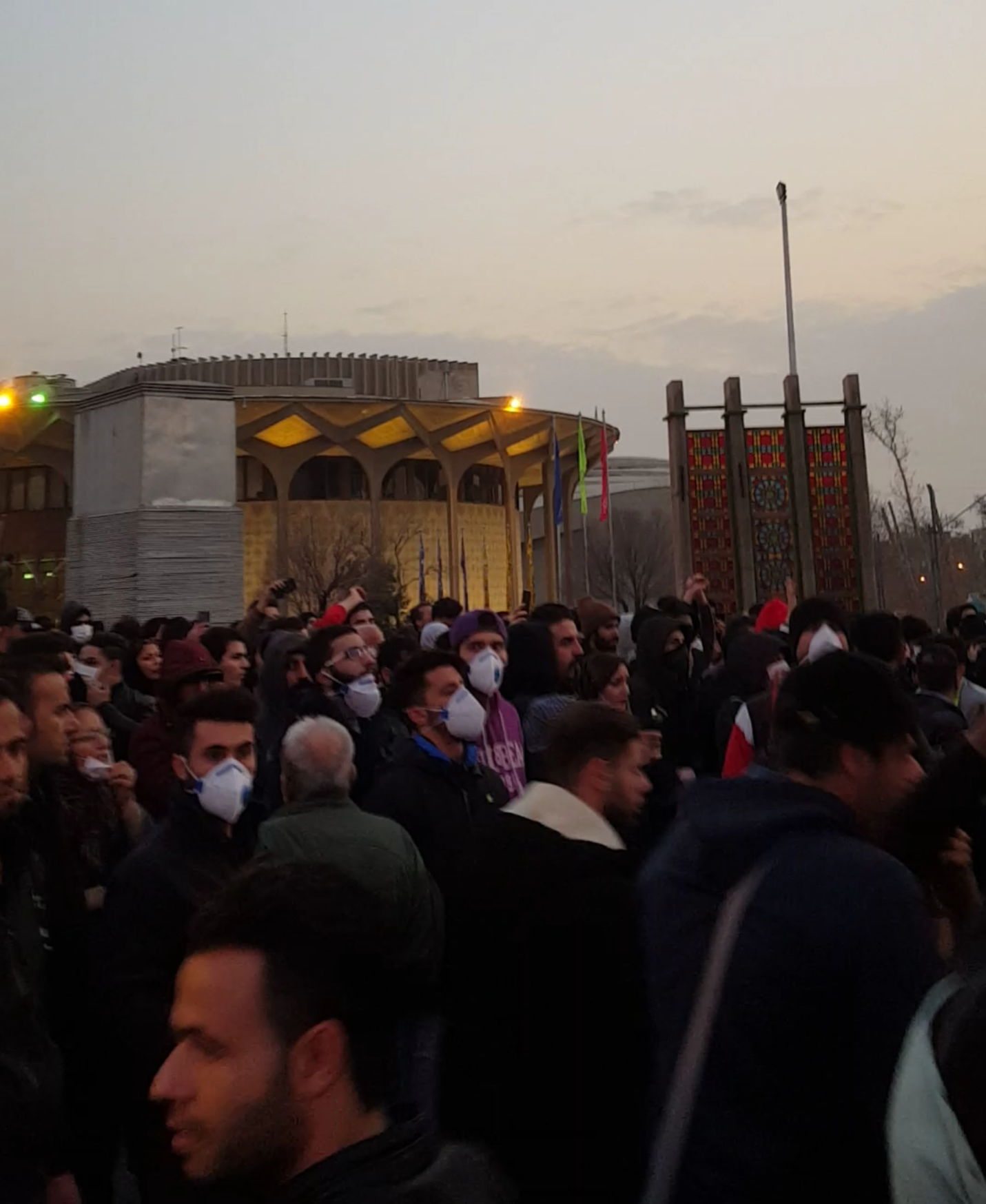
Protests in City Theater of Tehran, 30 December 2017

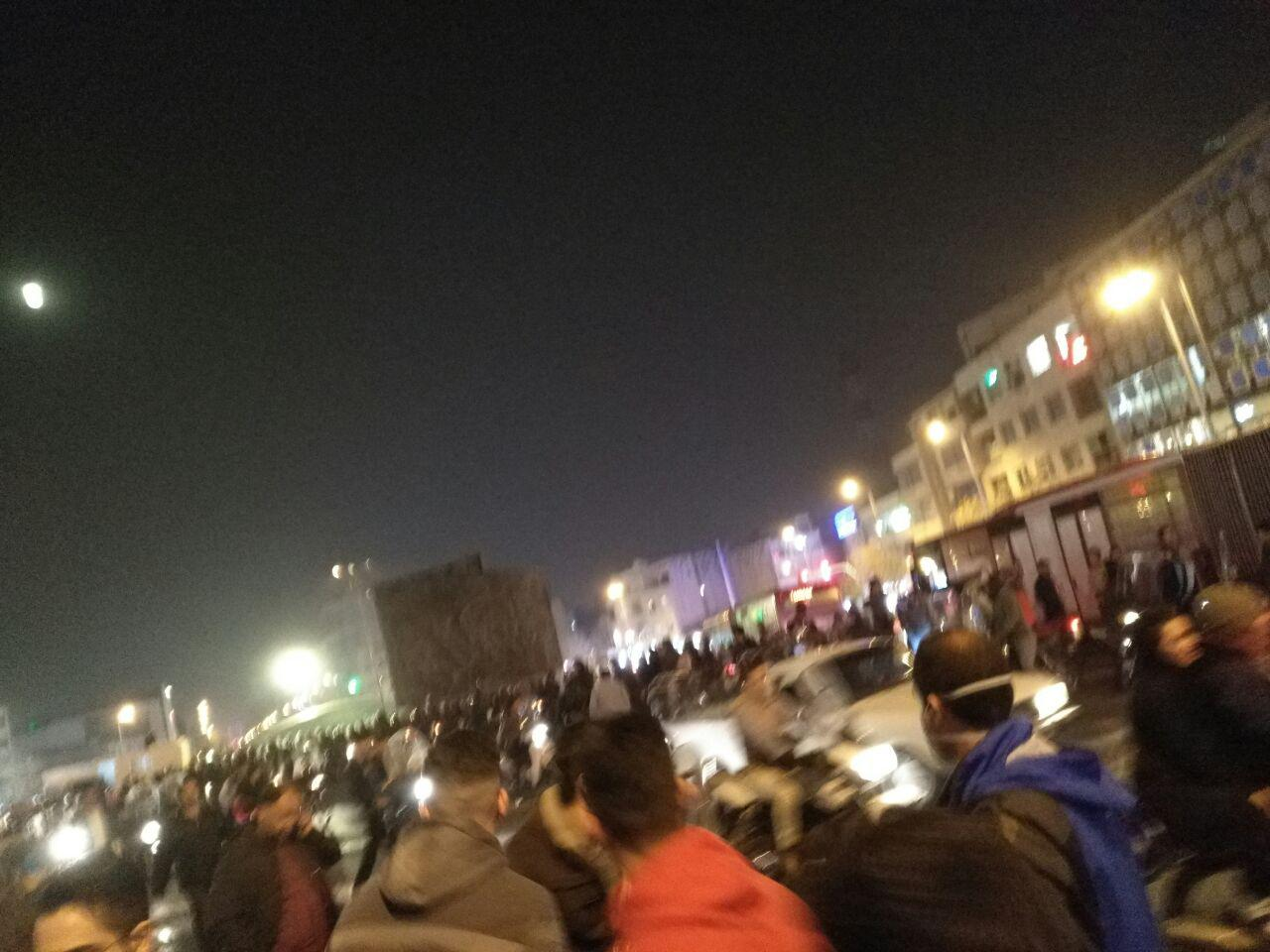
Anti-government protests in Tehran's Enqelab square, 31 December 2017

Protests continued on Monday in Tehran and other cities throughout the country. State media reported that one member of the government security forces was shot and killed during protests on 1 January.

Clashes overnight between protesters and security forces killed nine people. State television reported that six of these deaths occurred after rioters tried to storm a police station in Qahdarijan with the intention of stealing weapons. Additionally, an 11-year-old boy and a 20-year-old man were killed in the town of Khomeinishahr, and a Revolutionary Guard member was killed in Najafabad. All three were killed with hunting rifles. 550 people had been arrested since the start of protests. 90 percent of those arrested are younger than 25 years old.

Protesters at the Iranian embassy in Geneva

On 3 January, there were sporadic demonstrations throughout Iran. In the city of Malayer demonstrations started after sundown and their chants targeted the Supreme Leader. Videos online also showed demonstrations in the northern city of Noshahr, with protesters shouting "death to the dictator". Major General Mohammad Ali Jafari, the head of the Islamic Revolutionary Guard Corps, dispatched forces to the provinces of Hamadan, Isfahan and Lorestan, but he later stated that "the sedition" and the number of protestors was around 1500 in individual locations and around 15,000 nationwide. Iranians living outside of Iran staged demonstrations in support of the protests in Iran. These rallies took place in cities such as Stockholm, Athens, Bern, and Cologne.

According to an Iranian intelligence ministry announcement on 4 January, three IRGC members were killed dismantling an anti-government "terrorist cell" in northwestern city of Piranshar. Per IRGC, the "terrorist cell", which possessed weapons and explosives, was said to have been assigned with bombings and murder of innocents in Iran in order to escalate the unrest. On Thursday, 4 January, anti–government demonstrations were held in the cities of Sanandaj, Bukan, Kamyaran, Dezful, Ahvaz and Rasht.

UN human rights experts urged Iran to respect rights of protesters, and end the Internet crackdown.

The Iranian Revolutionary Guard said that Iran's people and security forces, including the Basij, police, and Intelligence Ministry, had defeated the unrest. The IRGC said the United States, Britain, Israel, Saudi Arabia, People's Mujahedin of Iran, and monarchists were responsible for the unrest. For the fifth day, staged rallies were held against the anti-government protests. However, according to an article in The Wall Street Journal, signs of unrest remain, with dozens of videos circulating in social media showing the burning of government documents.

According to a report in Al-Quds Al-Arabi, former president Mahmoud Ahmadinejad may have been arrested in Iran and kept under house arrest with the approval of Supreme Leader Ali Khamenei, for "inciting violence", after he criticized the current government of Iran during the protests.

Sina Ghanbari, a 23-year-old man arrested during the protests, was reported to have died at Evin prison from unspecified causes. Iranian MP Tayebeh Siavoshi said the protester committed suicide in prison.

Thousands of demonstrators holding placards with pictures of Reza Pahlavi II marched in Los Angeles, home to a large Iranian expatriate community, to show support for anti-regime protests in Iran. Some 2,000 protesters in Westwood, Los Angeles, rallied in support of the protesters in Iran.

==== Pro-government rallies ====
The December protests coincided with the annual rally commemorating the 9 Dey rally, 4,000 people attended to support the government.

On 3 January, thousands of counter protesters marched in pro-government rallies which were broadcast on national television, against alleged US involvement in the unrest. According to The Washington Post, the rallies appeared like "state-organized gatherings", while the Revolutionary Guards-affiliated Fars News Agency described them as "the revolutionary outburst of Iranian people against lawbreakers".

Pro-government rallies continued in the following days in several Iranian cities. Reuters described these rallies as "staged".

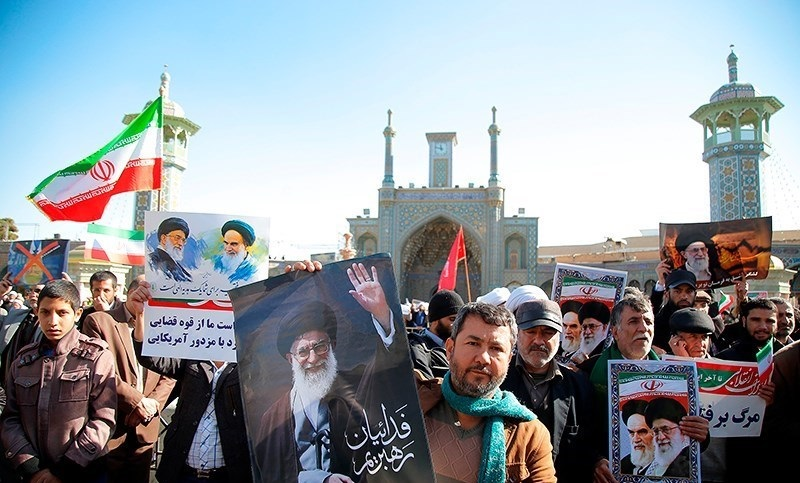
Pro-government rally in Qom, 3 January 2018

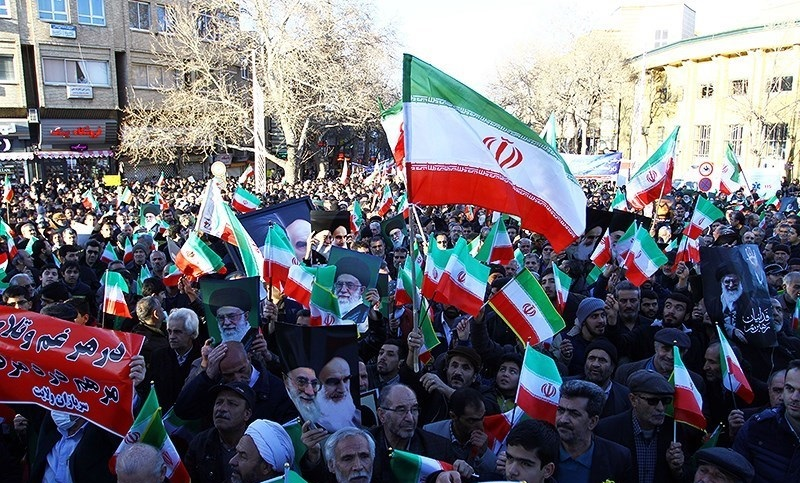
Pro-government rally in Hamedan, 3 January 2018

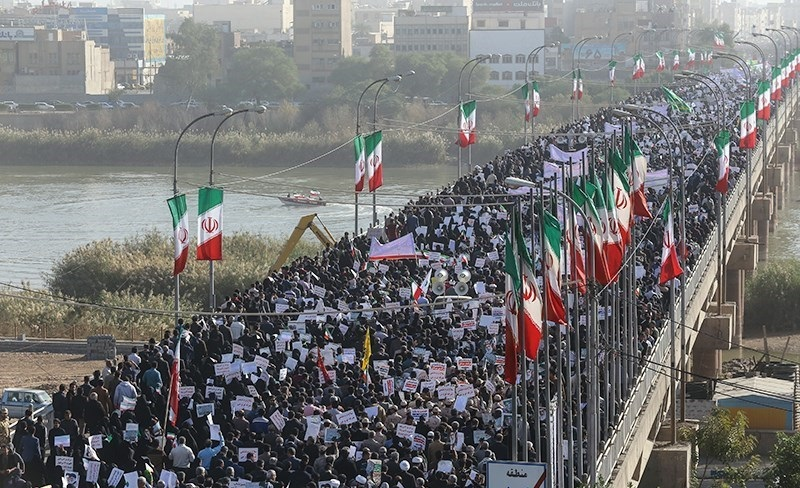
Pro-government rally in Ahvaz, 3 January 2018

=== March 2018 ===
The 2018 Khuzestan protests, that are dubbed "the Uprising of Dignity", were a series of protests by Iranian Arabs located in the Khuzestan province of Iran. The protests started on 28 March 2018, and were against discrimination towards the ethnic Arab minority. They started after a popular Iranian cartoon show that used figurines to depict the different ethnicities of Iran, ignored the Arab minority located in Khuzestan. About 200 people were arrested by the security forces in April 2018. There may have been one death; there were 11 injuries.

=== August 2018 ===
On 1 August, protests occurred in several Iranian cities. The protests began in Isfahan and continued in Karaj. In videos that circulated on social media, purportedly filmed in the town of Gohardasht, a suburb of Karaj, dozens of demonstrators were seen in the streets setting fire to police vehicles and shouting "Death to the dictator". Police responded with tear gas. The authenticity of the videos could not immediately be verified.

Protests broke out on 2 August across several Iranian cities, including Mashhad, Kara, and Shiraz, and Tehran. Chants during demonstrators included "death to the dictator".

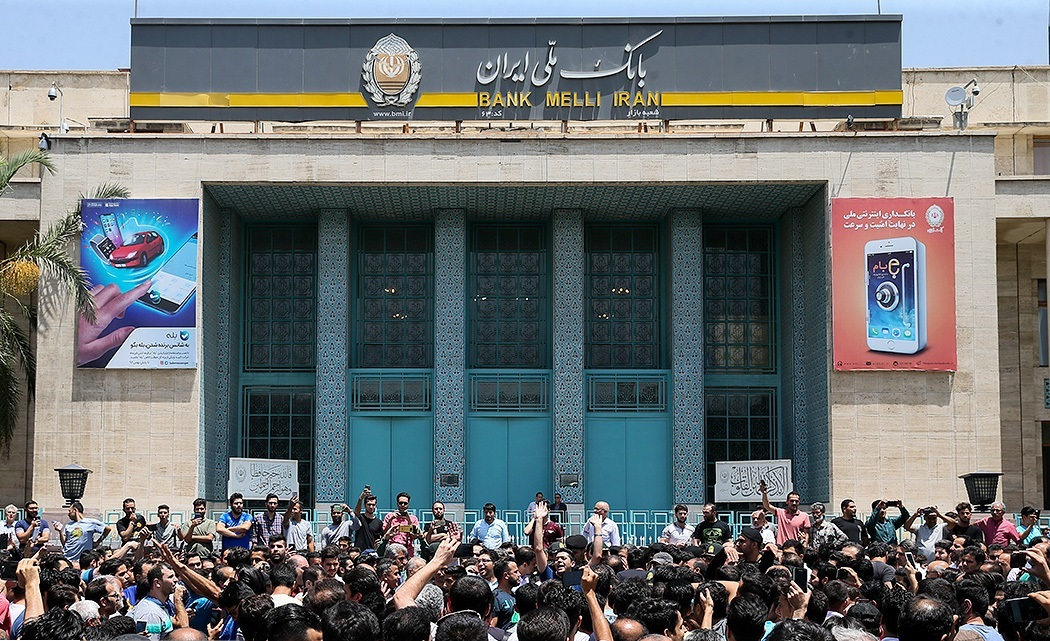
Bazaar protests in front of the Iranian National Bank, Bank Melli Iran

On 3 August, street protests took place in the capital Tehran, and nine other cities: Ahvaz, Hamedan, Isfahan, Karaj, Kermanshah, Mashhad, Shiraz, Urmia and Varamin. Some citizen journalist reports said Iranian security forces tried to break up the demonstrations with tear gas and by beating and arresting protesters. But, there were no credible reports about how many Iranians were hurt and detained by the authorities. Protesters also targeted a religious school in Karaj province near Tehran.

== Casualties ==
In the first four days of protests, 12 protesters were killed in clashes with security forces. On 1 January, state media reported the death of a security force member in Tehran, after he was shot with a hunting rifle. As of 2 January, a total of 21 protesters have been killed. State television reported that six were killed following a failed raid on a police station. Included among the dead are five people in Qahderijan and six in Tuyserkan. Some journalists reported that security forces attempted beating the protesters and using tear gas, according to VOA News.

On 9 January 2018, The Guardian and Amnesty reported that three detainees had died while in custody in Tehran's Evin Prison. Amnesty reported a further two detainees having died in custody in Arak and Dezfoul respectively. Iranian judiciary officials confirmed the Arak death and one Evin death, and said that the deaths were suicides. The local prosecutor in Arak told the Mizan News Agency that video footage, which was not released, showed the dead protester stabbing himself with a knife.

Many Iranians, including a number of lawmakers, have called into question the declaration by Iranian authorities that two deaths in custody were "suicides" and that another death was a "terrorist" who died in clashes with security forces. According to ISNA, a group of lawmakers called for an investigation into these deaths, saying relatives and eyewitnesses had questioned the official line.

According to French newspaper Le Monde, 25 people at all died during these demonstrations.

=== Torture allegations ===
According to Fox News, hundreds of protesters, including family members of detainees, protested outside of Evin Prison demanding information on their loved ones who according to the protesters were being tortured inside. The US White House described reports of torture and death in prison as "disturbing".

In mid-December 2018 family of Vahid Sayadi Nasiri a political prisoner in Qom prison in Iran, told reporters that he had died. Nasiri had been on hunger strike for weeks before he died in prison. Vahid Sayadi Nasiri was arrested in 2015 for insulting the Supreme Leader Ali Khamenei. On 13 December 2018 a spokesman for United States Department of States, Robert Palladino, announced that United States condemns Iranian regime for the "unconscionable" death of Vahid Sayadi Nasiri who was on hunger strike in jail. Nasiri was forcefully arrested four months ago and had no access to lawyer.

== Damage to public property ==
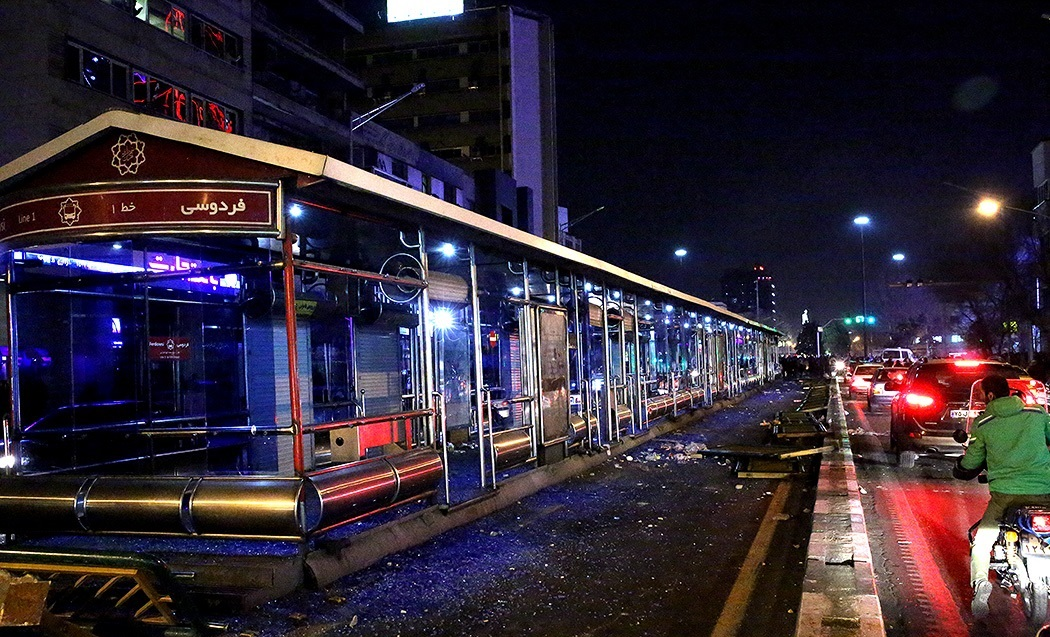
Damage to a Tehran Bus Rapid Transit station during January 2018 protests in Tehran

On 30 December 2017, Tasnim News Agency reported that fifty protesters damaged Tehran Bus Rapid Transit stations and broke the handrails in Ferdowsi Square, Tehran. According to the report of the Tehran mayor, Mohammad Ali Najafi, the damage to the public properties in Tehran "was not that serious" and only some of the Bus Rapid Transit (BRT) stations and a number of garbage cans were burned.

In Dorud, according to Mehr News Agency, on 31 December 2017 protesters attacked the staff and damaged the fire trucks. In another incident, also in Dorud, two people died when a hijacked fire truck collided with a car, according to the state media. The Washington Post reported that in some cases protesters had attacked police stations and government buildings. The Islamic Republic News Agency said that weapons and military uniforms among protesters were taken into custody by Iranian security guards.

== Government response ==
=== English banned in primary school ===
Primary schools in Iran suspended the teaching of English after the mass protests. Khamenei had previously claimed that it paved the way for "cultural invasion" of Western values, expressing deep concern in 2016 over the spread of English to "nursery schools".

=== Media coverage and censorship ===
In statements by the Iranian Minister of Interior Abdolreza Rahmani Fazli, said that the improper use of social media was "causing violence and fear", further stating that "such behavior will be smashed". Iranian state news channel Islamic Republic of Iran News Network was banned from covering the protests.

Reports by independent media organizations in Iran was restricted. However, Iran's state media covered Rouhani's comments about the protests which said "people have the right to criticize" but the authorities would not tolerate antisocial behavior and that criticism is "different from violence and destroying public properties".

==== Internet ====
In some regions, Iran's internet service providers, which are either directly owned by or closely tied to the Iranian Revolutionary Guard, which reports directly to the Supreme Leader of Iran, blocked internet access in several cities as protests continued. Previously, several satellite networks in Iran were jammed, and internet and telephone in some areas were cut. VPNs, which had offered a backdoor to the internet, were also turned off.

According to OpenDNS's BGP Stream, on 1 January 2018 Iran's internet traffic dropped by nearly 50%. Meanwhile, the number of Iranians making use of TOR has increased significantly during the protests.

==== Telegram ====
Telegram messenger played a major role in spreading the news about the protests and served as the primary platform to unify the protesters. On 30 December, the Iranian government requested the closing of a Telegram channel called "Amad News" (AMAD standing for Agaahi, awareness, Mobaareze, combat & Democracy) operated by Roohollah Zam which called for use of handmade explosives against the security forces. The request was accepted by Telegram since it also violated their terms of service and policies, and its CEO Pavel Durov received criticism for complying with the request. The channel was reinstated on the next day with a different title (Sedaye Mardom, lit. Voice of People) after the admin who published the post calling for violence was dismissed. On 31 December, the Iranian government blocked access to Telegram after it had refused to ban another channel. Telegram CEO Pavel Durov tweeted that "Iranian authorities are blocking access to Telegram for the majority of Iranians after our public refusal to shut down telegram.me/sedaiemardom and other peacefully protesting channels."

The government lifted restrictions on Telegram on 13 January 2018. but again applied permanent restrictions after late April 2018. Iranian government created another version of the app that works beside telegram called Talagram or Telegram Golden and one more clone called Hotgram with overhauled censorship and features.

==== Instagram ====
Iran blocked Instagram on 31 December 2017. The access was restored on 6 January 2018.

=== Arrests and executions ===
By 14 January, over 440 protesters who were arrested during the Tehran riots had been released, according to Tehran prosecutor Abbas Jafari Dolatabadi.

On 19 February, Iranian MP, Mohammad Kazemi claimed that a lower court in Malayer had sentenced a fifteen-year-old boy to five years in prison for pulling down the flag of the Islamic Republic of Iran in a city square during the protests.

Mostafa Salehi, a protester accused of killing an Iranian paramilitary during the 2017–2018 protests, was executed in 2020 in the Isfahan Province.

== Opinions ==
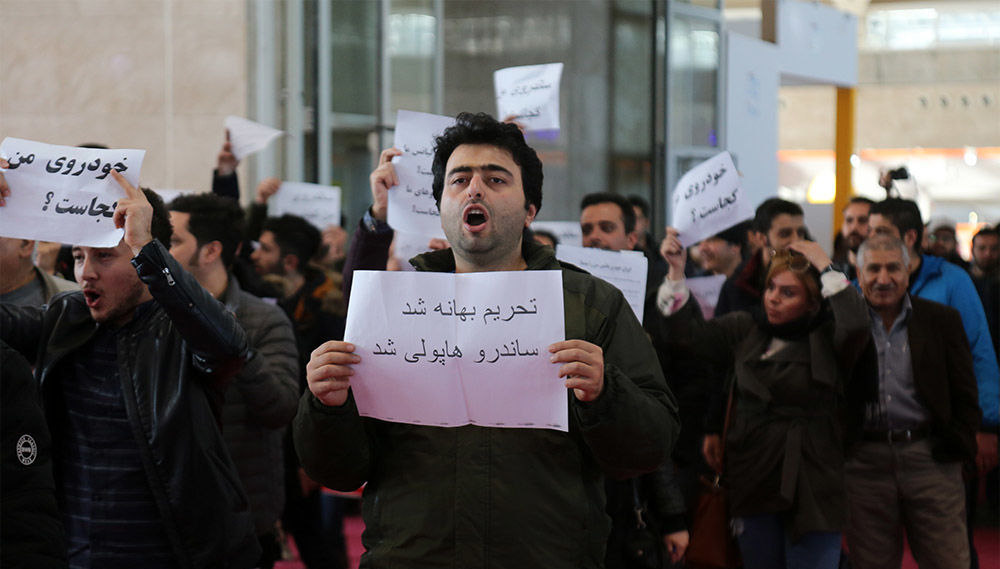
A man protesting to the economic situation

Conservative Iranian politician and economist Ahmad Tavakkoli blamed the protests on economic conditions experienced by the poor, for which he blamed the Rouhani administration, the policies of International Monetary Fund, and problems experienced by depositors due to non-regulation of financial institutions. Sadegh Zibakalam, a reformist Iranian academic and pundit, blamed the protests on the lost hopes of young educated unemployed Iranians, who he said felt betrayed given the Rouhani administration's earlier promises of change. He also opined that use of monarchist slogans was only the youths' way of expressing their anger at the establishment, not an indication of real support for the Pahlavis; he said he could understand the grievances of the protestors but considered them counterproductive. As deposited by the guardian, the protest mostly comprises Iranian workers under the age of 25.

Iranian author Majid Mohammadi posited three causes for the protests: government corruption, economic hardships, and religious authoritarianism. In his opinion, religious authoritarianism was the most salient target of the protests since protesters had come to believe that the Guardianship of the Islamic Jurist was determined to preserve the status-quo and not susceptible to reform.

According to Trita Parsi, the founder and president of the National Iranian American Council, the main participants in these protests were different from those involved in the 2009 Iranian presidential election protests. Parsi suggested that the protesters were mainly those disillusioned with the Iranian reform movement or who never supported it. He said Iranian Reformists had been surprised by these protests and had not come out in support of the protestors.

American journalist and political commentator Bret Stephens wrote that "real democracies don't live in fear of their own people", referring to the crackdown on protesters, and the Internet. He said that one of the reasons the protesters called for Khamenei to step down was frustration over his control of a financial organisation called "Setad" that was worth at least $95 billion in 2013 (according to a report from Reuters). According to Aljazeera, the leaders of Iran have pointed fingers at foreign media for overstating the extent of the protest.

The New York Times columnist and commentator on Iranian politics Roger Cohen, argued that "Trump Is Right, This Time, About Iran", writing that even if Trump's support of protestors "sounds hollow", he is right to tweet that the "wealth of Iran is being looted" by a "brutal and corrupt Iranian regime". Whereas Philip H. Gordon, senior fellow in US foreign policy at the Council on Foreign Relations, wrote in the same newspaper that the best thing the President could do to support Iranians was "Be quiet and do nothing", arguing that if "Mr Trump blows up the deal and reimposes sanctions, he will not be doing the opposition a favor but instead giving Iranians a reason to rally to—rather than work against—the government they might otherwise despise."

Elliott Abrams, a former U.S. Assistant Secretary of State for the Reagan administration, criticized The New York Times on 31 December for what he said was misleading coverage of Iran's protests. In his view, the news coverage diminished the value of Iran's protests, limiting it to the economic sphere, while the slogans suggested that the political dimension of the demonstrations was also significant.

According to Scott Waldman, climate change may have helped spark the protests as Iran has been suffering from a cycle of severe droughts from the 1990s, suffers from dust storms, and mismanaged water resources. The rising temperatures may be an underlying cause for economic difficulties that led to the protests.

Rudy Giuliani, Trump's personal lawyer, suggested that Iranian June protests were "orchestrated" from outside the country. He said: "those protests are not happening spontaneously. They are happening because of many of our people in Albania [which hosts an MEK Iran compound] and many of our people here and throughout out the world." Some Iranian watchers believe that the protests were constituted by traditional Iranian Politicians, according to Vox.

In research published in Journal of International Affairs in 2020, financial economist and activist Saeed Ghasseminejad and colleagues argued that in 2017 protests in Iran had switched from reform to revolution, in the sense of aiming to overthrow the Islamic Republic. They argued that five factors: "geography, demography, violence levels, organization/cohesion, and slogans of protests" provided evidence for a switch.

== Reactions ==
=== National ===
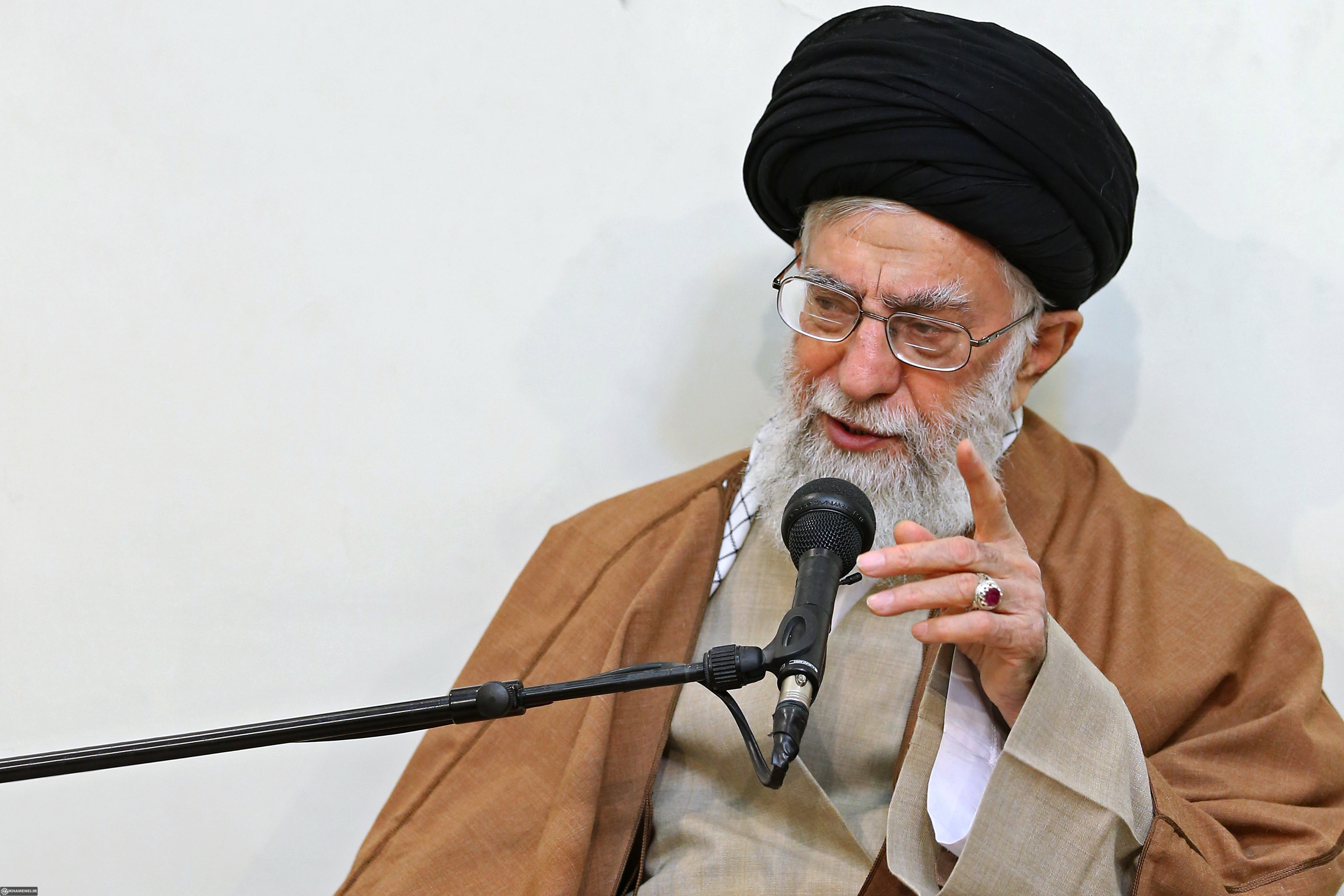
Khamenei condemned the protests and described them as "Fitna" like the 2009 protests.

- Khamenei blamed "the enemies" of the Islamic Republic for the unrest, saying, "In the events of the past few days, the enemies of Iran are deploying every means at their disposal including money, arms and political and intelligence support to coordinate making troubles for the Islamic establishment".
- In early 2018, Rouhani phoned French president Emmanuel Macron to ask him to act against the Mujahideen-e-Khalq (People's Mujahedin of Iran), an exiled Iranian opposition group based in Paris, and accused them of fomenting the recent unrest.
- Rouhani stated that Iranian people have an inalienable right to express their criticism about their country's problems, adding that protests should not be expressed in a manner that makes people feel their lives and the revolution have been threatened. He asked security forces to avoid the use of violence "as they did so far". In reference to US President Trump's expression of support for the protestors he said, "this man in the US who pretends to have sympathy for our people today should keep in mind that he was the one who called the Iranian nation terrorists months ago. This man who is against Iranians wholeheartedly has no right to feel sympathy for the people of Iran."
- Iranian foreign ministry's spokesman, Bahram Qassemi, responded to Trump's tweets saying "the Iranian people do not tolerate the opportunistic and hypocritical slogans of US officials", and "the constitution of the Islamic Republic of Iran establishes democratic structures for legal protection of the civil rights of the people and the possibility of pursuing these demands within the framework of the law is fully possible".
- Ali Shamkhani, the Secretary of the Supreme National Security Council, said that the US, UK and Saudi Arabia were inciting riots by their use of hashtags and social media campaigns.
- The Islamic Revolutionary Guard Corps issued a statement and pledged that the organization will closely observe "future acts of sedition" and "in supporting the Guardianship of the Islamic Jurist, will allow no harm to be inflicted upon the country".
- Former Iranian Foreign Ministry spokesperson, Hamid Reza Asefi, said Saudi Arabia is seeking to exploit and misuse of what he termed "civil rallies and freedom of expression" and claimed that Saudi regime is trying to incite chaos in Iran for their own political ends. He said Iranian people and the government would never let the Saudi government or any other country to take advantage of the protests and even interfere in Iran's domestic issues. He further said the protests are not being held against the government but against economic problems.
- Judiciary Chief Sadeq Larijani ordered prosecutors and law enforcement to take serious measures against rioters and vandals, warning they would be punished firmly.
- On 29 December 2018, Hassan Khomeini the grandson of the founder of the Islamic Republic, in response to the growing discontent across the country said that there was no guarantee that the regime would not be overthrown.

=== Diaspora ===
- Farah Pahlavi, the exiled widow of Mohammad Reza Pahlavi, the former shah of Iran, responded in support of the protests on her Instagram and Facebook accounts
- Reza Pahlavi II, the exiled son of Mohammad Reza Pahlavi and Farah Pahlavi, posted a supportive message on his Telegram channel on the second day of the protests.

=== International ===
- EU – European Union foreign-policy chief Federica Mogherini called for restraint.
- United States –
  - United States President Donald Trump posted a series of comments on his Twitter account at the end of December, including saying "Many reports of peaceful protests by Iranian citizens fed up with regime's corruption & its squandering of the nation's wealth to fund terrorism abroad. Iranian govt should respect their people's rights, including right to express themselves. The world is watching! #IranProtest".
  - Nikki Haley, the American ambassador to the United Nations, criticized the Iranian government's response to the protests and expressed support for the protestors on 2 January, saying "This is the precise picture of a long oppressed people rising up against their dictators."
  - Rex Tillerson said in a 5 January interview, "We are supportive of the Iranian people achieving their aspirations for a better quality of life, for greater freedom. We believe they deserve that, but it will be up to the Iranian people to manage that peaceful transition. We support that."
  - On 11 December 2018, a group of U.S. Congress lawmakers joined an event organized by the Organization of Iranian American Communities (OIAC) in Washington, D.C. to express support for protesters in Iran.
- Russia – Foreign Minister Sergey Lavrov stated that the mass unrest in Iran was an internal affair of the nation and hoped that the crisis would evolve without any bloodshed and violence. He also emphasized that any foreign interference in internal affairs of Iran that may destabilize the situation was unacceptable.
- Turkey – Foreign Minister Mevlüt Çavuşoğlu said "We believe it is necessary to avoid violence and not succumb to provocations", concerning the reports of people dying and vandalization of public buildings in Iran. He also hoped that foreign interventions would be avoided. Recep Tayyip Erdoğan, the President of Turkey, condemned the US and Israel for the alleged interference in the internal affairs of Iran.
- Israel – Prime Minister Benjamin Netanyahu praised the protesters as "heroic" in their "noble quest for freedom". He added, "I heard today Iran's President [Hassan] Rouhani's claim that Israel is behind the protests in Iran. It's not only false. It's laughable. And unlike Rouhani, I will not insult the Iranian people. They deserve better."
- United Kingdom – Secretary of State for Foreign and Commonwealth Affairs Boris Johnson tweeted that he was "watching events in Iran with concern" and emphasized citizens' rights to peaceful demonstrations.
- France – French president Emmanuel Macron criticised America and its Middle Eastern allies for loudly supporting the protesters, on 3 January saying that "The official line pursued by the United States, Israel and Saudi Arabia, who are our allies in many ways, is almost one that would lead us to war."

=== Security Council meeting ===
On Friday 5 January 2018, following a request by Nikki Haley, U.S. Ambassador to the U.N., an emergency meeting was held at the UN Security Council about the violations of the human rights of the Iranian protesters. According to Tayé-Brook Zerihoun, Assistant Secretary-General for Political Affairs, videos posted on social media platforms showed protesters being beaten, and government buildings, banks and religious centres burning. Over 1,000 protesters had been arrested. Nikki Haley stated the events that happened during the previous week in Iran needed the attention of the world.

Although the US overcame Russian attempts to block a UN security council discussion of the Iranian protests, it lost European support to act against Iran. While the UK, France and Germany agreed with the US on protection of protesters' rights, they used the debate to reject American efforts to undermine the nuclear deal with Iran. French representative François Delattre said that the event was not a threat to international peace and security and said, "It is up to the Iranians, and to the Iranians alone, to pursue the path of peaceful dialogue." China, Russia and some other nations considered the protests as internal issue which did not relate to the security council.

== See also ==
- Restart (group)
- Iran student protests, July 1999
- 2009 Iranian presidential election protests
- 2011–12 Iranian protests
- 2018 Dervish protests
- 2018 Khuzestan protests
- 2018 Iranian water protests
- 2018 Iranian general strikes
- 2019 Iranian protests
- 2021–2022 Iranian protests
- Economy of Iran
- Girls of Enghelab Street
- History of the Islamic Republic of Iran
- Internet activism during the 2009 Iranian election protests
- Water crisis in Iran
- 2018 protests in Iran
