= Taye =

Taye is the name of an import Flemish noble house.

- Noble House of Taye: The Marquess of Wemmel.
  - Maria de Taye
  - François Philippe de Taye, Marquess of Wemmel.
  - Engelbert de Taye, Lord Mayor of Brussels.
  - Jacobus de Taye, Lord Mayor of Brussels.

Taye is a male given name of Nigerian and Ethiopian origin that may refer to:

- Taye Babalola (born 1991), Nigerian footballer playing in Israel
- Taye Biddle (born 1983), American football wide receiver
- Tayé-Brook Zerihoun (born 1942), Ethiopian United Nations official
- Taye Diggs (born 1971), American theatre, film and television actor
- Taye Taiwo (born 1985), Nigerian footballer playing in Turkey
- Peter Taiye Oladotun (born 1985), Nigerian footballer playing in Malta
- Moges Taye (born 1973), Ethiopian marathon runner
- Yemenashu Taye (born 1979), Ethiopian long-distance runner

== See also ==
- U.S. Grant Tayes (1885–1972), African American painter, musician, barber, and columnist in Missouri
