= Oladotun =

Oladotun is a Nigerian given name or surname. Notable people with the name include:

- Baba Oladotun (born 2008), American basketball player
- Dotun Olatunji (born 1979), nickname of Nigerian cricketer Oladotun Olatunji
- Oladotun Ojuolape Kayode (born 1984), known professionally as Do2dtun, Nigerian personality, actor, and entrepreneur
- Olatunji Oladotun Alade (born c. 1993), known professionally as Dotman, Nigerian singer, rapper, and executive
- Peter Taiye Oladotun (born 1985), Nigerian footballer
