= Stone (font family) =

Stone (font)
- Category: Basic
- Designer: Sumner Stone
- Date created: 1987
- Re-issuing foundries: Linotype; ITC

The ITC Stone font family is a collection of typefaces designed by Sumner Stone, a typeface designer and graphic artist. It was created in 1987 with Bob Ishi when Stone was the Director of Typography at Adobe Systems. The font family includes four different types: ITC Stone Serif, ITC Stone Sans, ITC Humanistic, and ITC Stone Informal. It was created with the intention that different styles could be mixed into one page.

== Design ==
The design of the ITC Stone font family ensures that the font families can be used simultaneously within the same context. The way they interrelate is that they share the same cap height, lowercase x-height, and stem weights. The font is simple, legible, and modern.

== History ==
Stone used pencil drawings to draft out the Stone font family, which included versions Serif, Sans, and Informal. He finished them using Adobe Illustrator. In 1992, the family was expanded by John Renner with "linguistic symbols used by the International Phonetic Association." In 2005, an additional version, ITC Stone Humanistic, was added. In 2011, Vladimir Yefimov added the Cyrillic version, which was released by ParaType, a font department of a company based in Moscow.

== Subfamilies ==
- ITC Stone Serif
- ITC Stone Sans
- ITC Stone Humanistic
- ITC Stone Informal

Medium, semi-bold, and bold types are available in both roman and italic.
