= Haystack (software) =

- Developer(s): Daniel Colascione
- Initial release: 2010
- Operating system: Windows, Mac OS X, Linux
- Type: Anonymity
- License: Proprietary
- Website: haystacknetwork.com

Haystack was a never-completed program intended for network traffic obfuscation and encryption. It was promoted as a tool to circumvent internet censorship in Iran. Shortly after the release of the first test version, reviewers concluded the software did not live up to promises made about its functionality and security, and would leave its users' computers more vulnerable.

== History ==
Haystack was announced in the context of the perceived wave of Internet activism during 2009 Iranian election protests. There was a great deal of hype surrounding the Haystack project. The BBC's Virtual Revolution television series featured the software in the context of attempts to bypass network blocking software in Iran. The project was composed of one programmer and a spokesperson. Early on in the project the CRC claims to have received a manual describing Iran's filtering software, written in Persian, from an Iranian official.

Amidst criticism from technologists, including Jacob Appelbaum and Danny O'Brien, on September 13, 2010, the Washington Post reported that security concerns had led to suspension of testing of Haystack. A message on the front page of the Haystack web site posted the same day confirmed the report, saying "We have halted ongoing testing of Haystack in Iran pending a security review. If you have a copy of the test program, please refrain from using it." The following day the BBC reported the same news and quoted the CRC as stating that source code to the application would be released.

== Shutdown ==
The resignation of the only programmer on the project, Daniel Colascione, effectively ended development of the Haystack project. The project web site is now defunct.
