= Internet activism during the 2009 Iranian election protests =

Internet activism and, specifically, social networking has been instrumental in organizing many of the 2009 Iranian election protests. Online sites have been uploading amateur pictures and video, and Twitter, Facebook, and blogs have been places for protesters to gather and exchange information. Although some scholars in the West stress that Twitter has been used to organize protests, Iranian scholars argue that Twitter was hardly used by Iranian citizens in the midst of the 2009 protests.

== Use of social networking ==
Twitter in particular has been seen a key central gathering site during the protests.

The U.S. State Department urged the company to postpone a scheduled network upgrade that would have briefly put the service offline. Twitter delayed the network upgrade from midnight American time/morning Iran time to afternoon American time/midnight Iran time "because events in Iran were tied directly to the growing significance of Twitter as an important communication and information network", but at the same time denied that the State Department had "access to our decision making process". Social networking sites became the primary source of information, videos, and testimonials of the protests. Major news outlets, such as CNN and BBC News, gained much of their information from using and sorting through tweets by Twitter users and videos uploaded to YouTube. The use of social networking became central enough to the reports from Iran to make Prime Minister of the United Kingdom Gordon Brown state that the way the internet has democratised communication has forever changed the way foreign policy can be carried out and even suggest that web-based social networking could have prevented the Rwandan genocide.

Several reports disagree that the role of Twitter is central to the protests. The Economist magazine stated that the Twitter thread IranElection was so deluged with messages of support from Americans and Britons that it "rendered the site almost useless as a source of information—something that Iran's government had tried and failed to do". The Economist asserted that the most comprehensive sources of information in English by far were created by bloggers who pulled out useful information from the mass of information, of whom it singles out Nico Pitney of the Huffington Post, Andrew Sullivan of The Atlantic and Robert Mackey of the New York Times. A study by social media analytics company Sysomos shows that of 65 million population, there are only 19,235 Twitter users who disclose their location as Iran.

== Internet activism and hacktivism ==
=== DDoS attacks ===
Mousavi's supporters, through social networking sites, exchanged scripts for launching distributed denial of service attacks (DDoS) against Ahmadinejad's website. British citizens were reported to support the DDoS attacks against president Ahmadinejad by providing software for launching them. Many anti-Ahmedinejad activists have attacked the websites of Ahmedinejad and the government. The impact of the attacks remains unclear. At times the government's official website (ahmedinejad.ir) was inaccessible.

=== Anonymous Iran ===
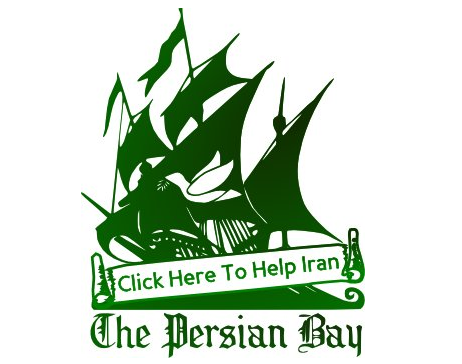
Homepage of The Pirate Bay on 20 June 2009; it remained renamed in solidarity for several days, as Anonymous and TPB had collaborated on the launching of the website Anonymous Iran.

Anonymous, together with The Pirate Bay, established the Iranian Green Party Support site Anonymous Iran during the protests. The site, which has drawn over 22,000 supporters worldwide, provides several tools to circumvent the Iranian regime's Internet censorship; the site thus provides covert resources and support to Iranians who are directly protesting. Anonymous has published a short video on Iran and has released a message to the Iranian government, manifestos in which Anonymous declares its reasons for supporting the protests.

In addition to providing support and resources, the site also features a daily report on events in Iran by underground journalist Josh Shahryar called the Green Brief.

=== Haystack ===
On July 4, an IT professional called Austin Heap announced together with Daniel Colascione their preparations to release Haystack, what would be a program designed specifically to bypass Iranian authorities' Internet monitoring and censorship mechanisms and allow the Iranian population to access an unfiltered Internet.

The program has begun to be tested with the help of collaborators from Iran and development continued also for the supporting network of servers and its security policy.

Global advocacy group Avaaz.org donated a grant of $15,000 US for the ongoing project.

However, independent reviews showed the software was dangerously insecure. Not only did it fail to encrypt secrets properly, but it could also reveal its users’ identities and locations. Digital activist Danny O'Brien openly criticized Haystack over how it would leave its users vulnerable. Also, the Electronic Frontier Foundation has advised all of Haystack users to stop using it.

There were critics about the hype made at the time of the software announcement, with the government and media accepting all the claims at face value.

The disclosure of the security issues with Haystack has led its sole programmer, Dan Colascione, to resign and ultimately, to the announcement in September 2010 that the software had been withdrawn over security fears.

== Webcomics ==
Cover of Persepolis 2.0

A webcomic called Persepolis 2.0 was created in 2009 by Iranian-born artists Payman and Sina whose subjects were the re-elections of conservative Iranian president Mahmoud Ahmadinejad and the social turmoil that followed them. The novel uses previously published graphic material by Marjane Satrapi from the original Perspolis graphic novel and is ten pages long.

In an interview with Agence France-Presse, the pseudonymous authors said, "Marjane's images describe events from 30 years ago yet they mirror the postelection events so well." The artists live in Shanghai, China, and use only the names "Payman" and "Sina."

In an e-mail, Sina said that visitors of the website came from 120 countries, that the reception "has been great," and that he received e-mails from many people wishing to support the Iranians.

== See also ==
- International reaction to the 2009 Iranian presidential election
- 2009 Iranian election protests
- Persepolis
