= Lloyd J. Reynolds =

American calligrapher and professor

- Occupations: Professor of Creative Writing, Calligraphy, and Art History
- Employer: Reed College

Lloyd J. Reynolds (1902–1978) was an American calligrapher and professor at Reed College (1929–1969) who taught classes on creative writing, art, and calligraphy. Lloyd Reynolds was born in 1902 in Bemidji, Minnesota. He received a BA in Botany and Forestry from Oregon State University, then an English degree at the University of Oregon. He went on to receive an MA in English literature from the University of Oregon.

Reynolds started at Reed in 1929 in the English Department, teaching creative writing, then began teaching classes on art history and graphic arts. Reynolds' classes continued for several decades, and his students included Gary Snyder, Philip Whalen, Peter Norton, Charles Bigelow, David Eddings Willard McCarty, Kris Holmes, Sumner Stone, Jacqueline Svaren, Georgiana Greenwood, and informally Steve Jobs. Starting in 1949, Reynolds began teaching calligraphy classes at Reed, and retired from Reed and his last class in 1969. The calligraphy program at Reed was continued by Robert Palladino until the cancellation of the program by the college in 1984.

In 1954, Reynolds was targeted by the House Un-American Activities Committee, as were two other Reed professors. He reportedly refused to testify at the hearing.

In 1972, Reynolds was awarded an honorary degree from Reed College and was named Calligrapher Laureate of Oregon by Governor Tom McCall. He died in October 1978.

The Reed College Special Collections houses the Lloyd J. Reynolds Collection. The Cooley Gallery hosted the exhibition "Lloyd Reynolds: A Life of Forms in Art" in 2011.

== Publications ==
- Reynolds, Lloyd J. Italic Lettering & Handwriting: Exercise Book. Portland, Ore: Champoeg Press, 1963. OCLC 2203545
- Reynolds, Lloyd J. 1969. Italic calligraphy and handwriting: exercises and text. New York: Pentalic. OCLC 2203545
- Reynolds, Lloyd J. Weathergrams. Portland, Ore: Society for Italic Handwriting, Reed College, 1972. OCLC 9319640
- Reynolds, Lloyd J. Handwriting & Calligraphy. Oregon Rainbow: 4 (1976) 32–39.
- Reynolds, Lloyd J. 1979. Straight impressions. Woolwich, Me: TBW Books. OCLC 5421847
