= Death of Sina Ghanbari =

A portrait of Sina Ghanbari.

Sina Ghanbari (Persian: سینا قنبری, 6 January 1997 – 7 January 2018) was a young Iranian protester and consequently a political prisoner. He was arrested by the Iranian Islamic republic government's police during the 2017–2018 Iranian protests and died in the quarantine section of Evin Prison after being transferred there on January 7, 2018.

Mahmoud Sadeghi, Tehran's Representative and a member of the Education Committee of the Islamic Consultative Assembly, confirmed the death of Sinai Ghanbari. Some news sources have said that Sina Ghanbari was arrested by the police during the general protests of 2018, as he was only 23 years old. This is while some of Iran's domestic news agencies have announced his age only 22 years old. According to the Iranian officials, most of the detainees in the recent demonstrations and unrest in January 2018 are youths and youngsters. Hossein Zolfaghari, Deputy Secretary of State for Interior Affairs, said on Monday, January 1, 2018, that more than 90 percent of those arrested in the recent unrests were young and youngsters, with an average age of under 25, and most of them had no previous arrest and detention history.

== Death ==
Mahmoud Sadeghi, a parliamentarian, confirmed the death of Sina Ghanbari, a detainee in Iran's 2018 demonstrations, to warn of the recurrence of what was called "Kahrizak II". (@mah_sadeghi), meanwhile, a judiciary official in Iran declared the death of Sinai Ghanbari as "suicide".

Earlier, the committee for the follow-up of arrestments in January 2018 after the release of one of the detainees in Evin Prison, reported that Sina Ghanbari, 23, Tehran citizen, who had been detained for several days in the quarantine section of Evin Prison, died for unknown reasons. Hours after the news was announced of Sinai Ghanbari's death, the Director General of Tehran's prisons, said that the prisoner had killed himself as suicidal in the bathroom. Nonetheless, following the arrest of this young protester in jail, a member of the Iranian National Security and Foreign Policy Committee stated: "The subject of suicide by Sinai Ghanbari has not been approved, and we are investigating this issue."

== Reactions ==
On Monday, January 8, the Society of the Defense for Human Rights expressed concerns about the fate of all detainees, referring to the death of Sinai Ghanbari. The community also announced that there is no news of the fate of another 20-year-old, Ashkan Absoran. According to the statement, "On January 4th, he announced his arrest by phone to his family."
