= Sumner Stone =

American typeface designer and graphic artist

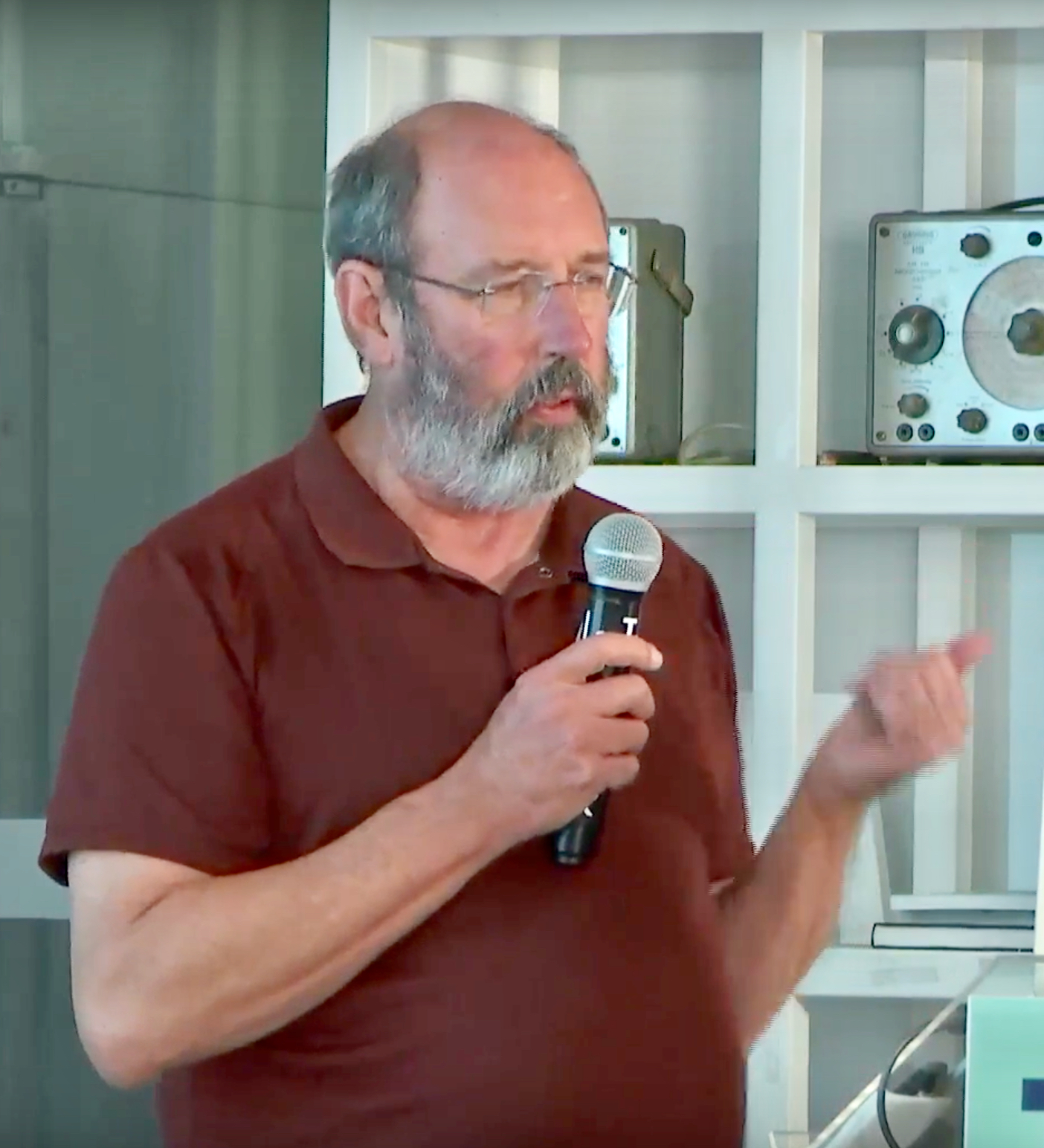
- Born: June 9, 1945 (age 81); Venice, Florida, United States
- Education: Reed College; Sonoma State University
- Occupation: type designer
- Notable work: ITC Stone typeface
- Website: http://www.stonetypefoundry.com

Sumner Stone (born 9 June 1945) is a typeface designer and graphic artist. He notably designed ITC Stone while working for Adobe. A specimen of ITC Stone is shown at his personal website.

== Career ==
Stone studied at Reed College, graduating with a degree in sociology in 1967, and earned an MA in Mathematics from Sonoma State University in 1977. After graduating from Reed, he took calligraphy lessons with Lloyd Reynolds.

1969–1971

Lettering Artist, Hallmark Cards. Kansas City, Missouri

1972–1979

Principal, Alpha & Omega Press, Sonoma, California

1979–1983

Director of Typographic Development, Autologic, Inc., Thousand Oaks, California

1983–1984

Director of Typography and Design, Camex, Inc. Boston, Massachusetts

1984–1989

Director of Typography, Adobe Systems, Inc., Mountain View, California: participated in the development of digitizing and editing tools; designed what was to become the ITC Stone typeface family; established and directed the Adobe Originals program; directed the business, technical, and design aspects of producing Japanese fonts in collaboration with the Morisawa company in Japan; invented and participated in the initial development of the Multiple Masters font software

Since 1990, Stone has owned and run the Stone Type Foundry, now located in Guinda, California.

== Typefaces ==
- Arepo
- Basalt
- Cycles
- Davanti
- ITC Bodoni
- ITC Stone (Stone Sans, Stone Humanist, Stone Serif, Stone Informal)
- ITC Stone II (Stone Sans)
- Leaves & Straw
- Magma
- Munc
- Numa
- Popvlvs
- Sator
- Scripps College Old Style
- SFPL
- Silica
- Stone Print
- Tuff

== Publications ==
"Transitions in Letterform: The Pre-Serif Letter". EJF Journal, January 2007.

Rock Wraps Paper, Inscriptions at the Old Public Library of San Francisco. Jack W. Stauffacher, ed. San Francisco: The Book Club of California and San Francisco Public Library, 2003.

"The Imperial Roman Letter". Society of Fellows News, American Academy in Rome, Fall 2003.

"Becoming Type", in Calligraphic Type Design in the Digital Age. John Prestianni, ed. San Francisco: Gingko Press, 2002.

Font: Sumner Stone, Calligraphy and Type Design in a Digital Age. Ditchling: Ditchling Museum and the Edward Johnston Foundation, 2000.

Foreword to Adrian Wilson, The Design of Books. San Francisco: Chronicle Books, 1993.

On Stone: The Art and Use of Typography on the Personal Computer. San Francisco: Bedford Arts, 1991. (Also published as Typography on the Personal Computer. London: Lund Humphries, 1991.)

"Forgotten Characters: An Adventure in Typographic Navigation", in Designer's Guide to Typography. Nancy Aldrich-Reunzel and John Fennell, eds. New York: Watson-Guptill, 1991.

"Hans Eduard Meier's Syntax Antiqua" and "The Stone Family of Typefaces: New Voices for the Electronic Age", in Fine Print on Type. Charles Bigelow and Linnea Gentry, eds. San Francisco: Bedford Arts, 1989.
