= Mizan News Agency =

Iranian news agency

- Type: News agency
- Founded: 2014
- Headquarters: Iran
- Key people: Mehdi Keshdar (CEO)
- Website: mizanonline.ir

Mizan News Agency (Persian: خبرگزاری میزان) is the official news agency of the Iranian judiciary.

== History and management ==
Mizan News Agency began operations in August 2014. The CEO since 2015 has been Mehdi Keshdar.

In February 2023, the X social network blocked Mizan News Agency's account due to multiple violations of rules regarding the spreading of hate.

== Content ==
Mizan News Agency specializes in news about judiciary-related topics, such as criminal proceedings, and also publishes general domestic and international news. IranWire in 2022 described one of its main functions as responding to criticisms about the judiciary and prison conditions. In May 2026, BBC Persian described its coverage of executions of protesters as "fraught with ambiguities and questions about the court process", and noted a consistent pattern of framing the cases in national security terms.

In 2018, Mizan News Agency published an article threatening BBC Persian journalists that they will "get what they deserve" for being "divisive" and "misrepresenting history", which the BBC condemned as a "significant escalation of the threats made against named BBC Persian staff".
