= Robert Palladino =

American Trappist monk and academic (1932–2016)

- Occupation: Academic

Robert Joseph Palladino (November 5, 1932 – February 26, 2016) was an American Trappist monk, calligrapher, and academic. He was a professor at Reed College in Portland, Oregon, where he taught Steve Jobs, and replaced Lloyd J. Reynolds as the head of the calligraphy program. Jobs credits Palladino's class with inspiring him to include multiple fonts on the original Mac. Despite his influence on Jobs, Palladino never owned a computer.

Although Reed's calligraphy program was dissolved in the 1980s, since 2012 The Calligraphy Initiative in Honor of Lloyd J. Reynolds, a program of the Douglas F. Cooley Memorial Art Gallery, has introduced a new generation of Reed students and community members to the study and practice of calligraphy and palaeography through a weekly Scriptorium. A month before his death in 2016, Robert Palladino returned during Reed's Paideia as a guest instructor.
