= Zemestan-Yurt coal mine disaster =

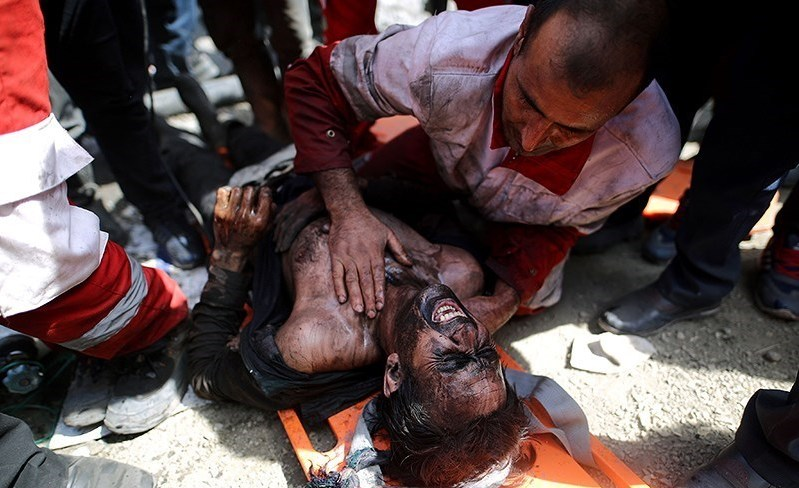

On 3 May 2017, an explosion occurred at a depth of 1,200 meters in a tunnel of the Zemestan-Yurt coal mine, Golestan Province, Iran, when miners were trying to power a locomotive using an external battery. 42 people were killed in the accident and at least 75 injured, primarily from burns and inhalation of toxic gas.
