= International reaction to the 2009 Iranian presidential election =

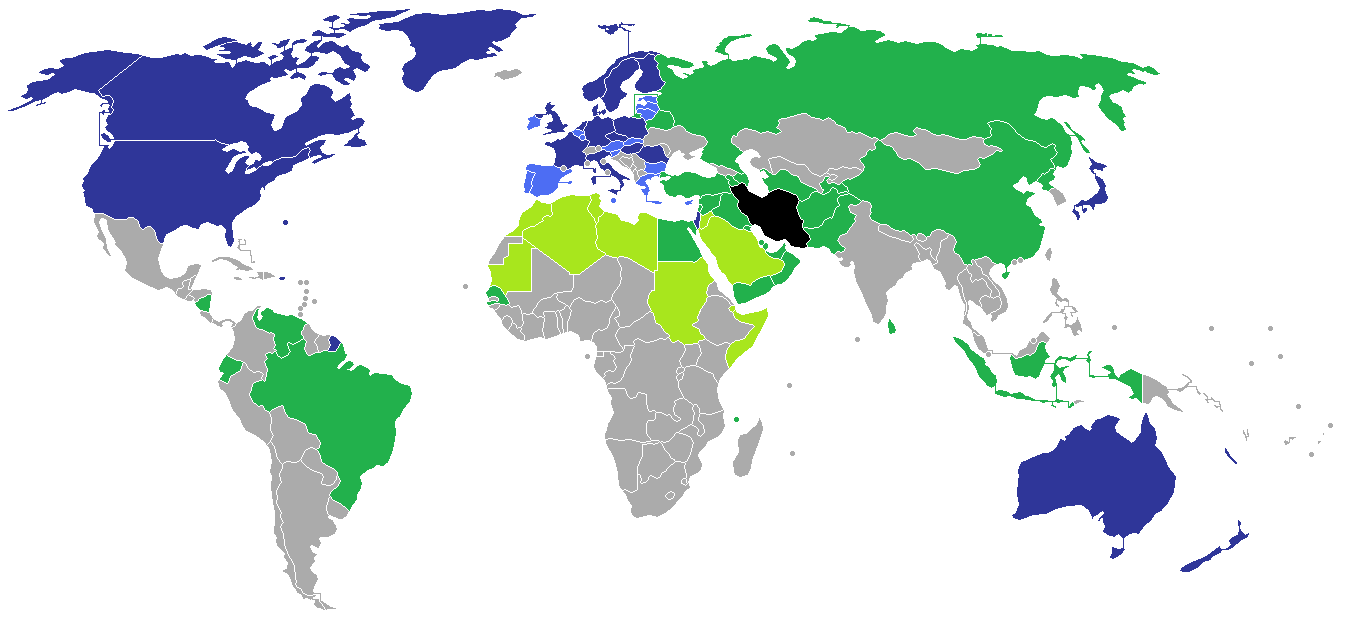
Map of countries by reaction to the 2009 presidential election Iran Congratulated Ahmadinejad Arab League members that have not reacted publicly to the results (the Arab League has welcomed the results) European Union members that have not reacted publicly to the results (the EU has expressed doubts over the results) Did not recognise election results

Reactions to the 2009 Iranian presidential election varied across the world. Most Western countries expressed concern, while most countries in Latin America, Asia, and Africa that expressed any opinion congratulated Mahmoud Ahmadinejad for his victory. The UN and EU also expressed concern about the aftermath.

Notably, the Austrian diplomats admitted his mission to Iran was in like with EU policy on Iran and in support of efforts to gather intelligence in the country after the election.

== Domestic political reactions ==
Mir-Hossein Mousavi has not asked for any kind of foreign assistance or called on other leaders to comment. His spokesperson, Mohsen Makhmalbaf, has criticised U.S. President Barack Obama for maintaining that the difference between Ahmadinejad and Mousavi "may not be as great as has been advertised." Makhmalbaf retorted, "Does he like it himself [when someone is] saying that there is no difference between Obama and [George W.] Bush?" He also said that other nations must "not recognize the government of Ahmadinejad as a legitimate government" and that "it's not only an internal matter- it's an international problem".

The Iranian government has made protests to representatives from the United Kingdom, France, and the Czech Republic for what it sees as their meddling in internal Iranian affairs. The British ambassador to Tehran was summoned to the Iranian Foreign Affairs Ministry on 17 June where Iranian officials deplored international media coverage of the protests. The United Kingdom expelled two Iranian diplomats after Iran expelled two British diplomats, whom Iran accused of spying.

In January 2010, Mohammed Reza Heydari, an Iranian diplomat in Oslo, resigned his post and was granted asylum by Norway. Over a year after the election and subsequent protests the number two diplomat at Iran's Finland embassy resigned saying "The situation got worse because...my people are being killed still. I won't go back to Iran because I could face capital punishment. I will stay abroad as a political activist." A few days later, Farzad Farhangian resigned as the press attache to the Iranian embassy in Belgium and sought asylum in Norway. He said he wanted to "take a stand in support of the Iranian people and the [opposition] movement." He also said the turning point for him was after the election, since when he could not "come to any agreement" with the ambassador at the embassy. He added that "We have had a lot of arguments since last year."

== Countries ==
=== Expressions of concern ===
- (Australia) On 16 June, Australian Foreign Minister Stephen Smith called for a fast, thorough and transparent investigation of the vote-rigging allegations. "It is now crystal clear that there are very grave doubts about the result so far as the Iranian election is concerned," Mr Smith told Parliament. "We are very gravely concerned about the very serious breaches of human rights we have seen."
- Canadian Foreign Minister Lawrence Cannon said that his country was "deeply concerned" by reports of election irregularities. On 15 June, Cannon told Parliament: "We have called for a full and transparent investigation into electoral fraud and discrepancies. The security force's brutal treatment of peaceful demonstrators is unacceptable." Canada also summoned Iran's top diplomat to explain the reported beating and detention of a freelance Canadian journalist in Tehran.
- The charge d'affaires for the Czech Republic has called for an inquiry on the election results.
- (Denmark) The Danish government has summoned Iran's ambassador to protest against post-election violence.
- Finnish Foreign Minister Alexander Stubb summoned the Iranian Ambassador Reza Nazarahari and stated Finland's unreserved condemnation concerning the use of violence by the authorities. Subb made an appeal for a peaceful settlement of the situation and the implementation of freedom of speech and opinion. In addition, he urged Iran to free the imprisoned opposition leaders and recount the votes cast in the Presidential elections in order to clear the suspicions concerning the election results presented in the country.
- French foreign minister Bernard Kouchner expressed worries with the election results. He also told that it "was the opportunity for Ahmadinejad to open discussions" but, instead, they used brutality. On 15 June, his office summoned the Iranian Ambassador to France to talk about the vote-tampering allegations. On 16 June, President Nicolas Sarkozy branded Iran's election result a "fraud," saying the subsequent unrest was a direct result of Ahmadinejad's failings in his first term.
- (Germany) German Chancellor Angela Merkel announced that "the German government is very concerned about the current situation." The chancellor demanded more information from Iranian authorities on the elections and the following unrest, saying the allegations of election fraud called for a "transparent investigation." She also criticised the use of "completely unacceptable force against protesters," the "wave of arrests" during the demonstrations and the fact that foreign media were being hampered from reporting on the developments. Foreign Minister Frank-Walter Steinmeier summoned the Iranian ambassador Monday to explain the disputed presidential election. "I have already prompted Iran, together with European colleagues today, to quickly shed light on what has happened there—if one can take the announced election results there seriously or not," he told German public television station ARD. As of June 2009 it was reported that German companies have fled Iran following riots.
- Israeli Defense Minister Ehud Barak has said, "I'm not sure if the results reflect the real will of the Iranian people". He also has labeled Ahmadinejad's re-election "bad news". Israel's deputy foreign ministry spokesman, Danny Ayalon, said: "With the results of the election in Iran, the international community must stop a nuclear Iran and Iranian terror immediately. If there was a shadow of a hope for change in Iran, the renewed choice of Ahmadinejad expresses more than anything the growing Iranian threat."
- Italy's foreign minister has said G8 countries will adopt a "tough" stance towards Iran over post-election unrest. Franco Frattini said Iran was "at a turning point" following the post-election street clashes, in which at least 17 people have been killed. "It must choose whether or not to keep the door open to dialogue with the international community," he said. "The hand extended by the United States, which we have supported, cannot come back with blood on it. "We will adopt a particularly tough and clear position."
- (Japan) Japanese Foreign Minister Hirofumi Nakasone said on 16 June: "We are extremely concerned about the confusion in Iran. We are carefully monitoring the situation... We hear about shootings. We hope that the situation will come to an end as soon as possible."
- On 16 June, Dutch Foreign Minister Maxime Verhagen summoned an Iranian diplomat to protest Tehran's crackdown on protesters and to call for the immediate release of detainees. According to a statement issued by Verhagen's office after the meeting, the minister asked Iran to probe complaints of election fraud as the Netherlands had "serious question marks" over the reliability of the results. He also protested against interference with foreign journalists and the arrest of a Dutch television crew, and demanded an explanation from the Iranian authorities for the intimidation and seizure of footage of Dutch journalists.
- On 16 June, Foreign Minister of New Zealand Murray McCully said: "The New Zealand government is concerned at the reports coming out of Iran of mounting violence, and calls on all involved to help restore calm... New Zealand shares the view of United Nations Secretary General Ban Ki-moon, and several European Union leaders, that the election process needs to be carefully explained."
- (Norway) Norwegian Foreign Minister Jonas Gahr Støre said: "There is much unrest in Iran around the results, and there are allegations of electoral fraud. This is alarming". He also said that they would have to take the results that has been released under advisement, and stressed that there had not been fully democratic election in Iran, saying that: "This is about candidates that have had to go through a pre-approval to be allowed to be candidates, and this can not be said to be acceptable from normal democratic standards". Mazyar Keshvari, an Iranian-Norwegian politician for the Progress Party, called the election "a huge farce from start to finish" and a "show-off", and said that "Ahmadinejad exceeds Comical Ali with his statements about the election in Iran was entirely free."
- (Poland) Polish Foreign Ministry announced that "[The ministry] calls government in Tehran to avoid actions which could result in bloodspill, and also expects the government to take responsibility of finding peaceful solution of the crisis, according to its obligations within international community."
- On 18 June, the Foreign Minister of Sweden Carl Bildt stated in a public pronouncement concerning the violence: "It is obvious that this is totally unacceptable ... [I]t is now of utter importance that the authorities respect the complaints which have been directed at the election and the counting of votes; and handle those in a correct and transparent manner".
- (United Kingdom) British Prime Minister Gordon Brown said on 16 June: "The elections are a matter for the Iranian people, but if there are serious questions that are now being asked about the conduct of the elections, they have got to be answered... There must be no violence in response to peaceful protests... the relationship they will have and the respect they will have from the rest of the world will depend on how they respond to what are legitimate grievances that are being expressed and have to be answered." Foreign Secretary David Miliband said that they viewed "the implications of recent events in Iran with serious concern." Miliband elaborated on that position on 17 June: "We deplore the violence and especially the loss of life but we will not end up in a position where anyone can accuse the US or the UK or any Western power of trying to choose the Iranian Government, that’s not our job."
- (United States) White House press secretary Robert Gibbs stated, "[l]ike the rest of the world, we were impressed by the vigorous debate and enthusiasm that this election generated, particularly among young Iranians. We continue to monitor the entire situation closely, including reports of irregularities". On 12 June—prior to the declaration of the winner—President Obama reacting to a question on the elections stated "We are excited to see what appears to be a robust debate taking place in Iran". Later, Vice President Biden has said, "[i]t sure looks like the way they're suppressing speech, the way they're suppressing crowds, the way in which people are being treated, that there's some real doubt". On 15 June, State Department spokesman Ian Kelly declared that the US was "deeply troubled by the reports of violent arrests and possible voting irregularities." The President echoed the statement later that day. Former U.S. President Jimmy Carter said after the vote that "I think this election has brought out a lot of opposition to [the President's] policies in Iran, and I'm sure he'll listen to those opinions and hopefully moderate his position." Former U.S. defense official Richard Perle remarked that the results "were not a surprise." Congressman Ron Paul criticised the reaction of the U.S. Government "on events thousands of miles away about which we know very little."

=== Expressions of congratulations ===
- Hamid Karzai, President of Afghanistan, congratulated Ahmadinejad with his election victory.
- Armenian President Serzh Sargsyan sent a congratulatory message to Ahmadinejad stating in part, "On behalf of the people of the Republic of Armenia and myself I warmly congratulate you on the occasion of your re-election as President of the Islamic Republic of Iran and wish you new successes and achievements."
- (Azerbaijan) Azerbaijani President Ilham Aliev congratulated Ahmadinejad with his victory on Monday, he said: "We place a particular emphasis on development of overall relations between our countries. We are pleased with close cooperation and constantly developing business relations that exist between our countries..."
- According to Fars News Agency, the King of Bahrain, the Prime Minister, and Crown Prince were all amongst the first of world dignitaries to congratulate Ahmadinejad. Foreign Minister Khalid ibn Ahmad Al Khalifah later met with the Iranian ambassador to Bahrain and said that Bahrain condemns any foreign interference in Iran's internal affairs.
- (Brazil) Brazilian President Luiz Inácio Lula da Silva dismissed the fraud possibility, congratulated Ahmadinejad for the victory and scheduled a visit to Iran soon.
- (Belarus) Belarusian President Alexander Lukashenko congratulated Ahmadinejad on his re-election as president of Iran on Saturday. He said: "I'm convinced that Belarusian-Iranian constructive relations will develop dynamically and that mutually advantageous strategic projects will be realised for the sake of the peoples of our countries."
- Reuters and Times Online reported that China endorsed Ahmadinejad's re-election. Chinese foreign ministry spokesperson voiced respect for, what he called, "the choice of the Iranian people" and hoped Iran could maintain stability.
- (Comoros) President Ahmed Abdallah Mohamed Sambi felicitated Ahmadinejad saying, "Ahmadinejad's reelection is a clear indication of the Iranian people's trust in their president's commitment to the move towards comfort and welfare of the country and the Iranian nation." He reiterated support for cooperation with Iran to materialize advancement and justice in the world, particularly in the Islamic Ummah.
- (Ecuador) President Rafael Correa congratulated his Iranian counterpart.
- Mohammad-Mehdi Akef, a leader in the Muslim Brotherhood in Egypt, sent a message of congratulations to Ahmadinejad.
- (Indonesia) Indonesian foreign ministry spokesman, Teuku Faizasyah said: "We welcome the victory of Mahmoud Ahmadinejad and are ready to continue our cooperation."
- Iraqi President Jalal Talabani congratulated his Iranian counterpart. Iraqi lawmaker Sami Askari, a confidante of Prime Minister Nouri Maliki, said that he expects Iran-Iraq relations to stay the same as before and that it would not have changed had the election gone another way. Muqtada al-Sadr all congratulated Ahmadinejad on this election victory. SCIRI leader Abdul Aziz al-Hakim sent a notice praising Khamenei that did not mention Ahmadinejad.
- (Kuwait) In a message of congratulations to Ahmadinejad, Kuwaiti Emir Sabah Al-Ahmad Al-Jaber Al-Sabah praised the healthy relations between the two nations, wished Ahmadinejad all the best, and expressed hope that the bilateral relations would witness more development.
- President Michel Suleiman congratulated Ahmadinejad and expressed hope that Iran and Lebanon would continue to expand their mutual relations. Prime Minister Fouad Siniora cabled Ahmadinejad, congratulating him on his election victory. Siniora said: "I am delighted to congratulate you on your election, and for the huge trust that the Iranian people have granted you. I hope that God will grant us success in the good historic relations between our two countries and two people."
  - Hezbollah leader Hassan Nasrallah congratulated Ahmadinejad for his victory.
- (Nicaragua) President Daniel Ortega congratulated Ahmadinejad and underlined continuation of growing cooperation between their two countries.
- Kim Yong-Nam, Supreme People's Assembly of North Korea, sent a message to Ahmadinejad on Sunday. Kim "sincerely wished him success in his responsible work to frustrate pressure and interference of outsiders and build independent and prosperous Iran".
- (Palestine) Fawzi Barhoum, a spokesman of the Hamas government in Gaza, hailed the election results and said: "The results of the elections in Iran show the wide public support for Iran's policy of challenge," referring to Ahmadinejad's anti-Israeli policy. Palestinian Islamic Jihad congratulated Ahmadinejad as well.
- (Pakistan) Pakistani President Asif Ali Zardari and Pakistani Prime Minister Yousaf Raza Gillani both sent separate messages congratulating Ahmadinejad with his victory. Zardari said: "This is indeed testimony of the confidence of the people of Iran in your leadership qualities and an acknowledgement of your outstanding services."
- Sheikh Hamad Bin Khalifa Al-Thani, the Emir of Qatar, also congratulated Ahmadinejad with his election victory.
- Russian President Dmitry Medvedev congratulated Ahmadinejad on his re-election. He expressed hope Tehran-Moscow friendly relations would be expanded in line of the two nations' interests and peace and stability of the region. On June 25, Foreign Minister Sergei Lavrov urged for all questions as to the results of the Iranian elections’ results to be resolved according to the Iranian laws. Mr. Lavrov expressed concern over the ‘outbreaks of violence in Tehran and other cities,’ calling for everyone to bear and forbear and not to outrun the existing laws. The minister also deflected the accusations of Russia having defiantly supported Mahmoud Ahmadinejad.
- (Senegal) Senegalese President Abdoulaye Wade congratulated Ahmedinejad and wished him success in his second term.
- Sri Lankan President Mahinda Rajapaksa, congratulated Ahmadinejad with his re-election, saying: "The Government and the people of Sri Lanka join me in congratulating you on Your Excellency’s re-election as the President of the Islamic Republic of Iran. For all of us in Sri Lanka, this is joyous news because we consider Your Excellency to be a close of friend of our country. It is my firm conviction therefore that during your new tenure of office, the close ties of friendship and cooperation between our two countries will be further strengthened to great heights for the mutual benefit of our peoples."
- (Syria) Syrian President Bashar al-Assad sent Ahmadinejad a cable in which he gave him his "best wishes for progress and prosperity" to the Iranian people.
- President of Tajikistan Emomalii Rahmon congratulated Ahmedinejad on his re-election.
- (Turkey) Turkish President Abdullah Gül and Prime Minister Recep Tayyip Erdoğan both congratulated Ahmadinejad on his reelection.
- (Turkmenistan) Turkmen President Gurbanguly Berdimuhamedow sent a congratulatory message to Ahmadinejad where he wished his Iranian counterpart prosperity, health and growing success, and hoped for expansion of close ties and cooperation between Iranian and Turkmen governments and nations.
- Abdullah bin Zayed Al Nahyan, the Foreign Minister of the United Arab Emirates, called his Iranian counterpart Manouchehr Mottaki and congratulated Ahmadinejad's re-election and lauded the massive voter turnout.
- (Venezuela) Venezuelan President, Hugo Chávez, phoned Ahmadinejad to congratulate his "great and important victory for people fighting for a better world".

== International organisations ==
- Amnesty International has called for an investigation into "the shocking scenes of violence meted out by the security forces."
- Arab League Secretary General Amr Moussa congratulated Mahmoud Ahmadinejad on his election victory. "We hope that the next term would witness progress on the relations between Iran and the Arab world and cooperation in establishing peace in the Middle East," he said.
- A statement by the administration of the European Union stated that the body is "concerned about alleged irregularities". On 15 June, EU foreign ministers meeting in Luxembourg issued a joint statement expressing concern about the use of violence against peaceful demonstrators in Tehran. "This is a situation that the Iranian authorities must investigate," their statement said. On August 6, 2009, European Union spokesman Amadeu Altafaj Tardio announced that the EU will not send a congratulatory message to Mahmoud Ahmadinejad on his election win, as the EU customarily does to newly elected national leaders.
- On 23 June 2009, the press office of Ban Ki-moon, the Secretary-General of the United Nations, expressed his concerns about the Iranian government's violent crackdown on the civil protests. His press office urged Iran's government "to respect fundamental civil and political rights, especially the freedom of expression, freedom of assembly and freedom of information" and to put an "immediate stop to the arrests, threats and use of force". The UN's General Assembly committee for social, humanitarian and cultural affairs voted to condemn human rights violations made by Iran.

== Media reactions ==
BBC News described the overall reaction by the international community to the election as "muted."

Analysts and reporters cited by media such as Times Online,. Fareed Zakaria GPS, The New Yorker, Fox News Channel, BBC News, The Daily Telegraph, The New York Times, Al Jazeera English, and Reuters have expressed doubts about the result of the election.

The Christian Science Monitor claimed Khamenei looked to remove his rival first-generation leaders – some of them the original leaders - of the Islamic revolution.

== Immigrant organizations ==
- Ali Mallah, the Vice President of the Canadian Arab Federation endorsed the election of President Mahmoud Ahmedinejad and stated that Western governments, "starting with the US and France" had been working to unseat Ahmedinejad, and criticized the "dehumanizing Ahmedinejad in the ugliest terms." Mallah stated that "They [Western media] were really preparing the stage to really distort the truth about the outcome of the result even before the election was announced and that shows their questionable interests." Finally, Mallah accused Western internet service providers of aiding and helping the Iranian opposition, claiming that "The videos and emails coming from inside Tehran are being supported by [American] Internet Service Providers."

== See also ==
- 2009 Iranian presidential election protests
