= Tayé-Brook Zerihoun =

United Nations official

Assistant Secretary-General for Political Affairs
- Incumbent
- Assumed office 28 April 2010
- Preceded by: Haile Menkerios

Personal details
- Born: 13 December 1942 (age 82); Ethiopia
- Children: 4

Tayé-Brook Zerihoun (born 13 December 1942) is an Ethiopian politician. He was appointed Assistant Secretary-General for Political Affairs in the United Nations Department of Political Affairs on 28 April 2010 by Secretary-General Ban Ki-moon.

Prior to his appointment, Zerihoun served from April 2008 as the Special Representative of the UN Secretary-General in Cyprus and Head of the UN peace-keeping mission in the country (UNFICYP).

Zerihoun also served in the UN Mission in Sudan (UNMIS) from August 2004 to March 2008, initially as Deputy and then as acting Special Representative of the Secretary-General.
