= Peter Taiye Oladotun =

Nigerian footballer

Personal information
- Date of birth: 6 December 1985 (age 40)
- Place of birth: Lagos, Nigeria
- Height: 1.82 m (5 ft 11 1/2 in)
- Position: Striker

Team information
- Current team: Lija Athletic F.C.
- Number: 9

Senior career*
| Years | Team | Apps | (Gls) |
| 2003–2006 | Mushiner Striker | | |
| 2006–2007 | Radnički Beograd | 4 | (2) |
| 2007 | Rudar Pljevlja | | |
| 2008 | Mladost Podgorica | | |
| 2008–2009 | Bežanija | 4 | (2) |
| 2009 | → PKB Padinska Skela (loan) | 13 | (3) |
| 2009 | Orijent Rijeka | 14 | (5) |
| 2010 | Radnički Kragujevac | 1 | (0) |
| 2010–2011 | Sutjeska Foča | 11 | (2) |
| 2011 | Kamza | 1 | (1) |
| 2012 | Marsaxlokk | 10 | (1) |
| 2013– | Lija Athletic | 1 | (0) |
- * Club domestic league appearances and goals as of 16 August 2013

Peter Taiye Oladotun (born 6 December 1985 in Lagos) is a Nigerian professional football striker playing with Lija Athletic F.C. in the Maltese First Division.

He had previously played with Serbian clubs FK Radnički Jugopetrol (Belgrade), FK Bežanija, FK PKB Padinska Skela and FK Radnički 1923 (Kragujevac), known that season as Šumadija Radnički 1923, also in Montenegro, with FK Rudar Pljevlja and FK Mladost Podgorica, and Croatia, with NK Orijent (Rijeka), before moving to Bosnia and Herzegovina and signing with FK Sutjeska Foča in summer 2010 to play in the First League of Republika Srpska. In summer 2011 he moved to Albania to play with KS Kamza in the Albanian Superliga but after only 6 months he moved to Malta by signing with Marsaxlokk F.C. in the Maltese Premier League. In January 2013 he joined Lija Athletic F.C. playing in the Maltese First Division.

== External sources ==
- Profile and photo at FK Radnički 1923 official site
- Peter Taiye Oladotun at Srbijafudbal
- 2010-11 stats at BiHsoccer
