= List of Iranian hip-hop artists =

List of active Iranian hip-hop musicians

Iranian hip-hop
Overview
- Origin: Iran
- Language: Persian and other languages
- Cultural origins: Hip hop music and Iranian popular music
- Development: Late 1990s–present
- Main scene: Iran and the Iranian diaspora
- Related genres: Persian pop, Underground music, trap

This is a list of active Iranian hip hop musicians.

Stage name	Full name	Year of birth	Country of residence	Notes
Dorcci	Mohammad Rashidian Dorcheh	1995	Iran	
Vafadar	Vafa Ahmadpour Damanab	1983	Iran	
Yas	Yaser Bakhtiari	1982	Iran	
Hichkas	Soroush Lashkary	1985	United Kingdom	
Reza Pishro	Mohammad Reza Naseri Azad	1988	Dubai	
Bahram	Bahram Nouraei	1988	Sweden	
Ho3ein	Hossein Rahmati	1989	Germany	
Erfan	Erfan Hajrasuliha	1983	United States	
Behrad Ali Konari	Behrad Ali Konari	1994	Iran	
AmirMafia	Amirali Azimzadeh	1989	Switzerland	
Fadaei	Ashkan Saranjam	1989	France	
Ali Quf	Ali Reza Ghasemi	1985	Iran	
Amir Tataloo	Amirhossein Maghsoudloo	1987	Iran	
Shahin Najafi	Morteza Najafipoor Moghaddam	1980	Germany	
Reveal	Mehrak Golestan	1983	United Kingdom	
Toomaj	Toomaj Salehi	1990	Iran	
Safaee		2001	Iran	
Ali Sorena	Ali Khoddami	1990	Iran	
Bahar Atish	Bahar Dehkordi	1990	Canada	
Shayea	Mohammad Reza Dadashpour	1992	Iran	
Arman Vino	Arman Davinia	1998	Germany	
Gdaal	Ali Ghani Nezhad	1992	Canada	
Farshad	Farshad Ghambari	1989	Iran	
Hiphopologist	Soroush Valizadeh	1993	Iran	
Chvrsi	Mahdi Jaafarpour	1998	Iran	
Poori	Pooria Bashari	1995	Iran	
Young Sudden	Mahmood Heydaripour	1999	Iran	
Shapur (Rapper)	Farzad Shabestanipour	1989	Netherlands	
Bengard	Amir Mehdi Rajabi	2004	Iran	
Hoodadk4			Iran	
Big Shaggy			Iran	
Putak	Pooria Arab	1991	Iran	
Sohrab MJ	Sohrab Mostafavi	1985	Iran	
Mehrad Hidden	Mehrad Mostofi Rad	1981	Iran	
Koorosh			Iran	
Arta	Arta Mir Hosseini	1996	Canada	
Sijal			Iran	
021kid	Tony Mohraz	1997	United Kingdom	
Amin Tjay		2000	Iran	
Vinak		1994	Iran	
Mahnam Navab Safavi			Iran	

== See also ==
- Persian hip hop
- Iranian music
- List of hip-hop musicians
- List of Iranian hip-hop groups and record labels
