= Ali Sorena =

Iranian Rapper (b. 1990)

Sorena
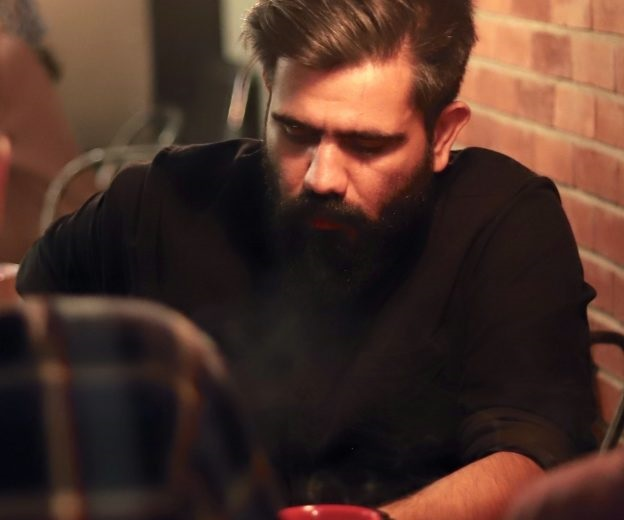
- Sorena in 2019

Background information
- Born: Ali Khodami; 17 January 1990 (age 36); Garmsar, Semnan, Iran
- Genres: Persian rap; Hip-hop
- Occupations: rapper; singer; songwriter
- Years active: 2008–present

Ali Khodami (Persian: علی خدامی; born 16 April 1990), better known by his stage name Sorena, is an Iranian rapper. In his music, Sorena explores social and political issues, with a particular focus on the role of women in society.

== Activity ==
Sorena addresses political themes in various ways through his music, but his initial silence during the start of the Woman, Life, Freedom Movement sparked controversy. However, he later voiced his support for the movement on social media. Ali Sorena is known as the "Lonely Man" because he performs most of his works solo and releases them as full albums. Notable examples include Negar and Gavazn. Like many other underground artists in Iran, Sorena works independently of the government, facing numerous challenges in releasing his works. In response to the 14th presidential election, Sorena declared the election illegitimate, writing the following on his Twitter account:

I say "no" to this fraudulent, decayed election, just as I say "no" to all other forms of oppression.

== Albums ==
=== Mard Tanha (February 2012) ===
#	name	vocal	producer	time
1	Gharibeh Nisti	Ali Sorena	Ali Sorena	04:46
2	Beshnas	Ali Sorena	Ali Sorena	03:40
3	Taghsir	Ali Sorena	Ali Sorena	04:03
4	Masti	Ali Sorena	Ali Sorena	02:41
5	Zendegi Hip-Hopi	Ali Sorena	Ali Sorena	04:45
6	Duel	Ali Sorena	Ali Sorena	03:00
7	Haft Khat	Ali Sorena	Ali Sorena	03:40
8	Khak Sorkh	Ali Sorena	Ali Sorena	02:58
9	Hala Vaqt Khab Nist	Ali Sorena	Ali Sorena	04:00
10	Bad Az Man	Ali Sorena	Ali Sorena	04:11

=== Avar (February 2014) ===
#	name	vocal	producer	time
1	Be Bache-t Begu	Ali Sorena	Atour	04:09
2	Nami-Tarsam	Ali Sorena	Mez'Rab	03:53
3	Shoroo	Ali Sorena	Mez'Rab	03:06
4	Majnoon-e Shahr	Ali Sorena	Mez'Rab and Ali Sorena	03:49
5	Do Shab	Ali Sorena	Atour and Ali Sorena	03:31
6	Atal Metal	Ali Sorena	Mez'Rab	03:00
7	Ba Man Qadam Bezan	Ali Sorena	Mez'Rab and Ali Sorena	03:58
8	Avar	Ali Sorena	Atour and Ali Sorena	04:06

=== Negar (March 2016) ===
#	name	vocal	producer	time
1	Tavallod	Ali Sorena	Ehsan Zia (Atour)	02:50
2	Berim Aghab-tar	Ali Sorena	Ehsan Zia (Atour)	04:08
3	Negar	Ali Sorena	Ehsan Zia (Atour)	03:22
4	Naghs	Ali Sorena	Ehsan Zia (Atour)	03:00
5	Kashti	Ali Sorena	Alireza Poorsohoolat (Mez'Rab)	03:23
6	Jari	Ali Sorena	Alireza Poorsohoolat (Mez'Rab)	01:26
7	Morphine	Ali Sorena	Ehsan Zia (Atour)	03:56
8	Atash	Ali Sorena	Alireza Poorsohoolat (Mez'Rab)	02:32
9	Tork	Ali Sorena	Ehsan Zia (Atour)	03:08
10	Pak	Ali Sorena	Alireza Poorsohoolat (Mez'Rab)	03:13
11	Turbine	Ali Sorena	Ehsan Zia (Atour)	02:08
12	Toofan	Ali Sorena	Ehsan Zia (Atour)	03:34
13	Marg	Ali Sorena	Ehsan Zia (Atour)	04:00

=== Kavir (October 2017) ===
#	name	vocal	producer	time
1	Kavir	Ali Sorena	Saeed Dehghan	04:49
2	Ganjeshgaka	Ali Sorena	Saeed Dehghan	04:58
3	Tiryak	Ali Sorena	Saeed Dehghan	03:38
4	Teatr-e Sayeh-ha	Ali Sorena	Ali Sorena and Saeed Dehghan	04:09
5	Maryam	Ali Sorena	Saeed Dehghan	03:20
6	Posht In Jangha (Freestyle)	Ali Sorena	Saeed Dehghan	06:20
7	Nafir	Ali Sorena	Ali Sorena	02:44

=== Gavazn (March 2020) ===
#	name	vocal	producer	time
1	Harekat (Arrabeye Marg)	Ali Sorena	Saeed Dehghan	04:10
2	Nakhoda Jelal	Ali Sorena	Saeed Dehghan	04:21
3	Daar (Dastan-e Maryam)	Ali Sorena	Saeed Dehghan	04:06
4	Goriz Az Markaz	Ali Sorena	Saeed Dehghan	04:42
5	Bi-Rahe	Ali Sorena	Ali Sorena and Saeed Dehghan	03:08
6	Raghs (Pichak)	Ali Sorena	Saeed Dehghan	03:25
7	Bad Pichid To Mazra-e Gandom	Ali Sorena	Shemrooni	04:42
8	Ghalb-ha-ye Atashin	Ali Sorena	Beatbynajwa	03:52
9	Laghzesh	Ali Sorena	Beatbynajwa	02:17
10	Darun	-	Ali Sorena	01:39
11	Gavazn	Ali Sorena	Ali Sorena and Saeed Dehghan	05:21
12	Istgah-e Shahr-e Yakh	Ali Sorena	Saeed Dehghan	04:47
13	Na Miram Na Barmigardam	Ali Sorena	Saeed Dehghan	02:50
14	Pelikan	Ali Sorena	Ali Sorena	03:33
15	16.6%	Ali Sorena	Shemrooni	03:41
16	Asayeshgah	Ali Sorena	Ali Sorena and Saeed Dehghan	04:43
17	Dasht-e Parvaneha	Ali Sorena	Ali Sorena and Saeed Dehghan	05:42
18	Cut	Ali Sorena	Ali Sorena	04:03

==== Khoone Khorshid (November 2024) ====
The album Khoone Khorshid, one of the rare collaborations of Sorena with other Persian rap artists, was created in collaboration with Bahram Nouraei and released in November 2024. The album's visual design was done by Erfan Ashourian, with artistic direction by Setareh Malekzadeh.

#	Title	Lyrics	Producer	Duration
1	Khoone Khorshid	Ali Soorena, Bahram Nouraei	Peymandegar	4:04
2	Malakeh	Ali Soorena, Bahram Nouraei	Ashkan Mousavi	5:08
3	Gorg o Mish	Ali Soorena, Bahram Nouraei	Peymandegar	5:40
4	Shere Bidari	Ali Soorena, Bahram Nouraei	Ashkan Mousavi	4:40
5	Sangsar	Ali Soorena, Bahram Nouraei	Ashkan Mousavi	5:20

==== Mojassameh (February 2025) ====
The album Mojassemeh, released on February 20, 2025. The production is shaped by the contributions of composers and producers including Saeed Dehghan, Atour, Farshad, PooYar, and Ali Sorena.

#	Name	Vocal	Producer	Duration
1	Mojassameh	Ali Sorena	Saeed Dehghan	4:08
2	Badhaye Vahshi	Ali Sorena	Farshad	2:59
3	Khaneye Sorkh	Ali Sorena, SarrSew	Saeed Dehghan	3:58
4	Sarzamine Bartar	Ali Sorena	Saeed Dehghan	3:56
5	Bandbaze Mast	Ali Sorena	Saeed Dehghan	3:44
6	Khab Dar Khab	Ali Sorena	Ali Sorena	3:44
7	Morse	Ali Sorena	Saeed Dehghan	4:53
8	Docharkheh	Ali Sorena	Saeed Dehghan	3:54
9	Enghelabe Rangha	Ali Sorena	Farshad	3:04
10	Ghatel Ya Maghtool	Ali Sorena	Atour	1:36
11	Gole Sorkh	Ali Sorena	Saeed Dehghan	3:25
12	Charkheshe Rangha	Ali Sorena, SarrSew	Saeed Dehghan	3:05
13	Enfejare Rangha	Ali Sorena	Farshad	3:12
14	Saeghe	Ali Sorena	Atour	3:48
15	Raghase Maghroogh	Ali Sorena, Pari Eskandari	Beatbynajwa	4:14
16	Ki Ba Ma Zooze Mikeshe	Ali Sorena	Saeed Dehghan	3:11
17	Mikeshan Ist	Ali Sorena	Atour	3:47
18	Toghyan	Ali Sorena	Atour	3:02
19	Mikhoonim Vase Taghia	Ali Sorena	PooYar	3:45
20	Shabe Sarde Kalanshahr	Ali Sorena	Saeed Dehghan	3:57

== Singles ==
The released singles by Sorena are divided into two categories:

- Songs released before the album "Lonely Man," which belong to the non-professional period and were recorded in a home studio. The composition of these songs was done by Sorena himself and includes "Jorm (Crime)," "Vatan (Homeland)," "Payan-Nameh (Thesis)," "Khis Shodi (You Got Wet)," "Amadeh Bash (Be Ready)," "Tasviri Az Dard-e-Man (An Image of My Pain)," and "Mohreh Bargasht (The Returned Piece)."
- Songs released officially after the album "Lonely Man," all available on platforms such as SoundCloud, Spotify, and others. These singles include "Mehran," "Booseh Yahuda (Judas' Kiss)," "Nagmeh (Melody)," "Nafas (Breath)," and "Akharin Vasvaseh (The Last Temptation)." Other songs are considered demos of low quality, removed album tracks, or practice versions that have been unauthorizedly released by some individuals.

(List of Released Singles)
#	Song name	Singer	Duration
1	Akharin Vasvaseh (The Last Temptation)	Ali Sorena	8:15
2	Booseh Yahuda (Judas' Kiss)	Ali Sorena	6:10
3	Mehran	Ali Sorena	3:50
4	Nagmeh (Melody)	Ali Sorena	3:47
5	Nafas (Breath)	Ali Sorena	3:42
6	Amadeh Bash (Be Ready)	Ali Sorena	3:58
7	Payan-Nameh (Thesis)	Ali Sorena	4:18
8	Khis Shodi (You Got Wet)	Ali Sorena	3:38
9	Jorm (Crime)	Ali Sorena	3:27
10	Mohreh Bargasht (The Returned Piece)	Ali Sorena	3:16
11	Tasviri Az Dard-e-Man (An Image of My Pain)	Ali Sorena	4:00
12	Vatan (Homeland)	Ali Sorena	2:49

== See also ==
- List of Iranian hip-hop artists
