= 021kid =

Iranian-British rapper

- 021kid in 2026

Background information
- Also known as: Tony Mohraz
- Born: Mohammad Amin Mohraz; 11 August 1997 (age 29); Tehran, Iran
- Origin: Tehran, Iran
- Genres: UK drill, Iranian hip-hop
- Occupations: Rapper, songwriter, record producer
- Years active: 2013 - present
- Label: Drillfarsi

Mohammad Amin/Tony Mohraz (Persian: محمدامین/تونی محرز; born 11 August 1997), known professionally as 021kid, is an Iranian-British rapper, singer, and songwriter.

Mohraz performs in both Persian and English and has been described in music media as an early figure in the development of Persian drill.

== Career ==
=== Early career ===
021kid's music career developed between Iran and the United Kingdom. After moving from Tehran to the UK in 2018, he became active in the London drill scene and revolutionized the genre by incorporating Persian-language lyrics into a whole new style of UK drill and hip-hop.

He kicked off his European career in August 2022 with Fumez the engineer then in October 2022 on the famous UK rap and drill freestyle rap platforms, Fire in the booth: plugged in and combining his talent with Charlie Sloth. He also collaborated at the time with other underground rappers like Chinx (OS), Sava, Mitch and Country Dons.

021Kid's most famous track went viral in March 2023, which he appeared in the third season show of The Cold Room, a freestyle series hosted by producer Tweeko and produced by Mixtape Madness at the time. He performed the opening episode of the season, becoming one of the Iranian artists associated with the UK's drill scene.

=== Political music ===
021kid's music has also addressed political and social issues in Iran. In 2024, Voice of America reported on a song by 021kid released in response to the death sentence issued to Iranian rapper Toomaj Salehi, with the song calling for his freedom.

In May 2026, 021kid released a Persian remix of the Israeli rap song Harbu Darbu by Ness & Stilla. The remix attracted international media attention for its political lyrics directed against the government of the Islamic Republic of Iran and its security forces.

=== London political activity in 2026 ===
With the January Protests in Iran uprising in early 2026, 021Kid released a series of music videos such as "Javid Shah" & "Lion and Sun" which expresses him with his sense of rebellion against the country's economic crisis, inflation and reputation. He strongly advocates for the return of Reza Pahlavi as the new leader for Iran.

== Discography ==
=== Singles and tracks ===
==== 2019 ====
- Amazing Grace — released 2 August 2019. This was 021kid's first released song.

==== 2020 ====
- PERSIANXXL — released 17 January 2020.
- Zone4 — released 1 February 2020.
- GOOD&EVOL — released 6 March 2020.
- 31tir — released 19 July 2020.
- Girim — released 4 August 2020.
- Dally — released as a single on 20 September 2020 and later included on ON MY OWN on 25 October 2020; featuring Nixxxsta.
- Highfive — released 25 October 2020; featuring Ramtin.
- BAD B — released 21 November 2020; featuring Aria Momed.

==== 2021 ====
- West London — released 21 January 2021; with 021G.
- Baby Bad — released 24 March 2021.
- Tarlan — released 21 April 2021; featuring El Chiefo.
- Pop That — released 4 June 2021.
- Come Back — released 8 August 2021; associated with ON MY OWN.
- SLAP — released 9 September 2021; featuring Chvrsi.
- Persian Gang Business — released 21 October 2021; featuring Sep SHZ.
- Off the Leash — released 30 October 2021.
- Shomare Daar — released 25 November 2021; featuring Saretan.
- Cocktail + Gillaass — released 4 December 2021.
- Yeki Meset — released 10 December 2021.
- Lemme Land (Remix) — released 25 December 2021; an unofficial remix of Canking and Ess2Mad's Lemme Land.

==== 2022 ====
- Psilocybin — released as a single on 14 February 2022 and later as a track on GSZ on 28 June 2023; featuring Poobon.
- Monde Yadam — released 25 February 2022.
- Haji Baba — released 7 March 2022 on Amadeus by Alireza JJ, featuring Young Sudden and 021kid.
- ISTAK — released 9 March 2022.
- 60min (freestyle) — released 14 March 2022.
- Labtar Kon — released 24 March 2022; featuring Ezza.
- Veda — released 10 April 2022.
- Baby — released as a single on 18 April 2022 and later as a track on Shahre Moon on 9 June 2023; by Hoomaan featuring 021kid.
- Toofani — released 1 May 2022; with Isam.
- Tourist — released 10 May 2022.
- Business Man — released 21 May 2022; with Ess2Mad.
- Live My Life — released 31 May 2022; with J Large.
- Kaka Sangi (Freestyle) — released 2 June 2022.
- Pabarja + Jalebe (2020) — released 12 June 2022.
- Aklil Soranj — released 25 August 2022 on IVXX VOL II (Vision) by Koorosh, featuring 021kid.
- Avalanche — released 22 September 2022; with Behzad Leito.
- Inja Irane — released 12 October 2022; with Putak.
- Naghabel — released 8 December 2022.
- Ey Iran — released 14 December 2022; with Tohi.
- Faze Sekte — released 24 December 2022 on Zooze by Catchybeatz, Soalk and ILLNOIZ, featuring 021kid.

==== 2023 ====
- Radioactive (GSZ Intro) — released as a single on 19 January 2023 and later as a track on GSZ on 28 June 2023.
- Random — released 31 January 2023.
- The Endz — released 2 February 2023.
- Hamejoore Hast — released as a single on 29 March 2023 and later as a track on Bache Tokhs on 9 May 2023; by Behzad Leito featuring 021kid.
- SOS — released 31 March 2023 on Mixtape Bonuses.
- Hendel — released 31 March 2023 on Mixtape Bonuses.
- On the Glide — released 31 March 2023 on Mixtape Bonuses.
- April Fools (Freestyle) — released 2 April 2023.
- Back Seat — released as a single on 17 April 2023 and later as a track on GSZ on 28 June 2023; featuring Sijal and Sepehr Khalse.
- Roulette — released as a single on 19 April 2023 and later as a track on Home Alone on 29 March 2024; by Koorosh featuring Poobon, Isam and 021kid.
- Big Spliff — released as a single on 10 May 2023 and later as a track on GSZ on 28 June 2023; featuring Tremz.
- Di Maria — released as a single on 23 May 2023 and later as a track on GSZ on 28 June 2023; featuring Isam.
- Yekshanbe (Freestyle) — released 28 May 2023.
- Gimicci Freestyle — released 13 June 2023.
- Moonlight — released 28 June 2023 on GSZ; featuring Sijal and persicat.
- Beriz — released as a single on 2 July 2023 and later as a track on 5 July 2023; with Omid ABN.
- Neriz Bou (Drill Version) — released 5 July 2023 on Beriz.
- Dastan — released 14 July 2023 on Noskhe by Hiphoplogist, featuring 021kid.
- ?Chishod — released as a single on 11 August 2023 and later as a track on Lowkey on 23 August 2023; by Sami Low, Raha and 021kid, featuring XWHISKY.
- 666 — released 17 August 2023 on Red Horn by Putak, featuring 021kid.
- Can't let go — released 15 September 2023.
- Lion Skin — released as a single on 3 October 2023 and later as a track on GSZ on 21 December 2023.
- No Hook — released as a single on 18 October 2023 and later as a track on GSZ on 21 December 2023; by 021kid featuring Putak.
- Comfy — released as a single on 25 October 2023 and later as a track on GSZ on 21 December 2023; by 021kid featuring Catchybeatz and Behzad Leito.
- 88 — released 19 December 2023 on Encounters by Atour, featuring 021kid.
- Merch, Odds, G Wag, Secret and Lodge — released 21 December 2023 on GSZ Vol. II.
- Zena — released 31 December 2023; the source states that the song was subsequently removed for unspecified reasons.

==== 2024 ====
- Palangi — released 3 January 2024.
- Classy — released 17 January 2024.
- Moody — released 2 February 2024; with Saeed Dehghan.
- Ye Name — released 8 February 2024.
- High Heel — released 23 February 2024; the source states that the song was subsequently removed for unspecified reasons.
- Lonely Streets — released 23 February 2024.
- Daroo — released 13 March 2024.
- 120min (Freestyle) — released 15 March 2024.
- Ting — released 17 March 2024.
- 8Rishter — released 2 April 2024; with Chvrsi.
- Toomaj — released 27 April 2024; the source states that the song was subsequently removed for unspecified reasons.
- Cartel — released 10 May 2024 on Khorshid Vol. I (Tolou) by Erfan, featuring Imanemun and 021kid.
- Case — released 24 May 2024.
- DAMN IT — released 6 June 2024.
- Double — released 2 July 2024.
- Ain't On Nuttin — released 5 July 2024 on Packs To Plaques by Country Dons, featuring 021kid.
- Ai — released 11 July 2024; by HeroSina featuring Poobon and 021kid.
- Many Men — released 21 July 2024; with Dalu.
- Jiiiiigh — released 24 July 2024 on Spicy by Behzad Leito, featuring 021kid.
- Stabby — released 20 September 2024.
- Petros — released 1 October 2024.
- Break — released 11 October 2024.
- Crooky — released 10 December 2024.

==== 2025 ====
- Lahze Akhar — released 8 January 2025.
- International Godfathers — released 24 January 2025; by D-Savv, Saamou and MaxThaDemon featuring Jay Bahd, Dezzie, 021kid, Izzpot and 26AR.
- Out of Sight (Freestyle) — released 20 February 2025.
- MARDE TANHA, TRAP ZAKHAR, PACK SEFID and NO TRUST — released 21 February 2025 on C4.
- Beezan Taar (Freestyle) — released 22 March 2025.
- Catch Up — released 16 April 2025.
- Ta delet bekhad — released 1 May 2025 on Abraye Noghrei 3 by Gdaal, featuring 021kid.
- Tatal (Freestyle) — released 13 May 2025.
- Jahanam — released 18 May 2025; with Gdaal.
- Overdose — released 25 May 2025.
- BADNESS — released 12 June 2025.
- ALZ — released 18 July 2025; featuring Yasna.
- Energy — released 11 September 2025.
- Demons (Freestyle) — released 21 September 2025.
- No ID Caller — released 29 September 2025.
- BEYNOL (FREESTYLE) — released 4 October 2025.
- London to Madrid — released 21 October 2025; with Parsa Jafari and ZORG.
- Casper — released 13 November 2025 on Comeback.
- Shake — released 3 December 2025; by Lil' Vader featuring 021kid.
- Parental Advisory — released 15 December 2025.
- Beri — released 26 December 2025; with Gdaal and Diata.

==== 2026 ====
- Javid Shah — released 6 January 2026.
- LION SUN — released 24 January 2026.
- Persian Warrior — released 2 April 2026.
- MY FLAG — released 12 June 2026.
- FULL FORCE — released 23 July 2026.
- SWEET ONE - released September 2026.

== See also ==
- Iranian hip hop
- List of Iranian hip-hop artists
- Music of Iran
