= Behrad Ali Konari =

Iranian rapper

- بهراد علی کناری
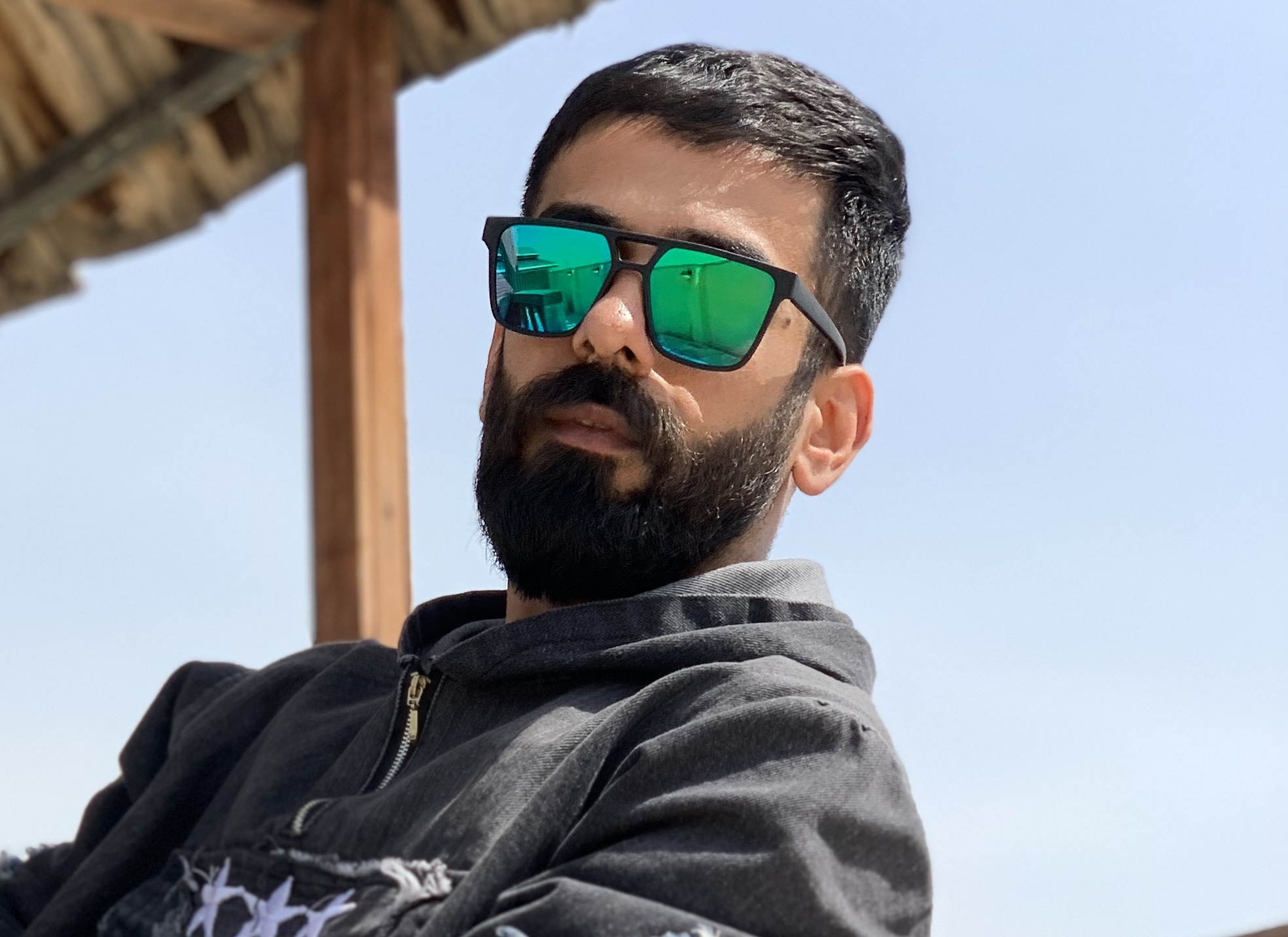
- Born: 21 July 1994; Ahvaz, Khuzestan Province, Iran
- Occupation: Rapper
- Known for: Opposing mandatory hijab
- Notable work: "Mr. President" music video
- Criminal status: Released

Behrad Ali Konari, a rapper from Ahvaz, is one of the sixteen defendants in the case of the death of Rouhollah Ajamian. Following the commemoration of Hadis Najafi in Karaj, he was sentenced to 25 years of imprisonment in exile by the initial court.

== Background ==
The Twitter account of 1500tasvir had previously announced that Behrad Ali Konari, a 28-year-old rapper from Ahvaz who was arrested during the 2022 Iranian protests in Karaj, had been charged with "Corruption on Earth" by a court in Alborz Province, putting his life in danger.

Behrad Ali Konari's court-appointed lawyer argued during the trial that his client had not committed any acts constituting "Corruption on Earth" under Article 286 and that his Instagram stories did not contain any evidence of incitement or conspiracy. Sources close to the rapper state that he is currently being held in the Karaj Central Penitentiary. Behrad Ali Konari, one of the detainees from the 2022 nationwide protests in the case known as the "murder of Basij member Rouhollah Ajamian," has been released.

On April 17, 2023, Behrad Ali Konari, the 14th defendant in the case related to the protests in Kamalshahr, Karaj, was released from Karaj Central Penitentiary after serving part of the imprisonment sentence issued against him.

== See also ==
- List of Iranian hip-hop artists
