= Ghowgha =

Ghowgha, Ghawgha, or Qowqa (Persian: غوغا) may refer to:

- Ghawgha Taban, Afghan singer
- Ghogha (rapper), Iranian singer

== See also ==
- Ghogha, a town in India
