= List of Iranian hip-hop groups and record labels =

List of Iranian hip-hop groups, collectives, and record labels

- Country: Iran
- Genre: Iranian hip-hop
- Related topic: Iranian hip-hop

This list of Iranian hip-hop groups and record labels covers record labels, music collectives, and hip-hop groups associated with the Iranian hip-hop scene.

Iranian hip-hop developed primarily through independent and underground networks. Because of restrictions on the production and distribution of rap music in Iran, many artists organized themselves through informal collectives, independent labels, and artist-led groups rather than conventional commercial record companies.

== Record labels and music collectives ==
=== Saamet ===
Saamet (صامت) was a music collective and label associated with the early Iranian hip-hop scene. It was founded by Hichkas, Reza Pishro, and Reveal.

Saamet is associated with several prominent artists from the early Iranian underground hip-hop movement. Sources discussing the collective have also associated artists and producers including Ali Quf, Mahdyar Aghajani, and others with its wider network.

=== Moltafet ===
Moltafet (ملتفت) is an Iranian rap and hip-hop music group and artist collective founded in 2011 by Hichkas, Mahdyar Aghajani, Fadaei, Reveal, and Ali Quf.

Shapur later joined the group. Hichkas and Reveal subsequently left Moltafet. The collective has been associated with rappers and producers including Fadaei, Ali Quf, Shapur, Mahdyar Aghajani, and Hekmat.

=== Paydar ===
Paydar (پایدار) is an Iranian hip-hop record label founded by rapper and producer Erfan Hajrasuliha, professionally known as Erfan Paydar.

Paydar became associated with artists working in Iranian hip-hop and the Iranian diaspora. Further information about its historical roster is documented inconsistently across available sources.

== Hip-hop groups and artist collectives ==
=== Zedbazi ===
Zedbazi (زدبازی) is an Iranian hip-hop group formed in 2002 by Saman Wilson and Mehrad Hidden, with Sohrab MJ joining shortly afterward. The group later included Alireza JJ, Sijal, and Nassim.

The group became associated with the development and popularization of gangsta rap within Iranian hip-hop. In 2022, Saman Wilson announced the addition of Sepehr Khalse and Behzad Leito, after which the expanded lineup was referred to as Z7.

=== TM BAX ===
TM BAX (تی‌ام بکس) is an Iranian hip-hop group associated with the Persian rap scene. Sources identify Alibi, Nabilety, and Shahin Loo among its core members.

The group began releasing music in the late 2000s and subsequently released several projects associated with the Iranian and Persian-language hip-hop scene.

=== Tik Taak ===
Tik Taak (تیک‌تاک) is an Iranian hip-hop group associated with Khashayar SR, Sina Saei, and Sina Mafee. Contemporary artist profiles and releases identify these musicians as members of the group.

An early group profile described Khashayar SR and Sina Saei as rappers, vocalists, and music producers, while later material and releases also credit Sina Mafee as a member.

== See also ==
- Iranian hip-hop
- List of Iranian hip-hop artists
- Persian music
