= Vafa Ahmadpour =

Vafa Ahmadpour Damanab
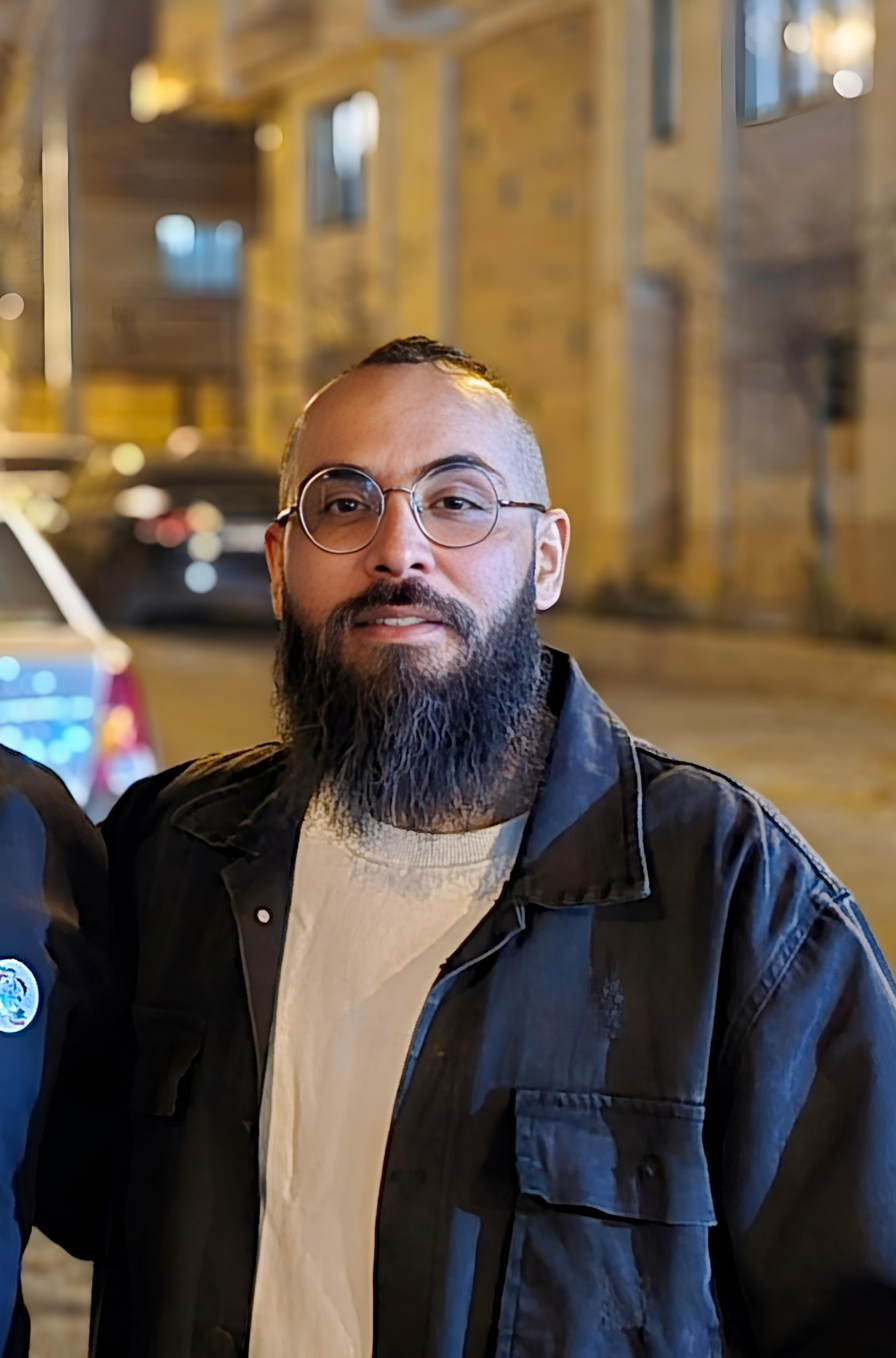

Background information
- Also known as: Vafadar
- Born: 1983 (age 42–43); Iran
- Genres: Rap
- Occupation: Singer
- Works: Songs: "We Protest"; "Barefooted"; "Renaissance"; "Black Life"; "Free"; "Standby"
- Years active: 2006–present

Vafa Ahmadpour, known by his stage name Vafadar, is a rapper from Iran. Vafadar began his artistic career in rap music in 2006. He and Danial Moghadam, protest rap artists, have voiced the crises and struggles faced by the Iranian people.

== Personal life ==
Despite being active in music since 2006, Vafa makes a living as a laborer. Due to threats from Iranian authorities over his protest songs, he lived in hiding for a while.

== Arrest ==
Vafadar's politically charged music led to his summons to court. After the 2022 Iranian protests, he went into hiding for a year. Security forces found his phone number, called him, and summoned him to court. Since a phone summons is not legally valid, he did not attend. In response, intelligence officers visited his former workplaces and raided his home, taking his family hostage to coerce him to surrender. On the night of February 4, 2024, Vafa decided to turn himself in for his family's sake. He was arrested in Tehran and transferred to an undisclosed location. PEN America strongly condemned his arbitrary arrest and called for his immediate release. On February 19, 2024, he was temporarily released from Evin prison on bail until his court hearing. Following the hearing, he was sentenced to one year in prison for propaganda against the state.

On Thursday, May 9, 2024, Vafa Ahmadpour and Danial Moghaddam were arrested in Shiraz following the release of the music video for "Amadebash," which addresses the repression of the 2021 uprising and criticizes the Islamic Republic, as well as the demographic challenges and issues facing the people of Iran. The video for "Amadebash" was filmed at Persepolis (Takht-e Jamshid). In the song, they address problems such as economic difficulties and the "morality police" (Gasht-e Ershad), stating that "the people of Iran" will remain united and "take over this country."

== See also ==
- Persian hip hop
- List of Iranian hip-hop artists
