= Moltafet =

Iranian rap and hip hop group

Background information
- Genres: Rap; Hip hop
- Years active: 2011–present
- Label: Moltafet
- Members: Fadaei; Ali Quf; Shapur; Mahdyar Aghajani (Producer); Hekmat (Producer)
- Past members: Hichkas; Reveal; Dariu$h Tk
- Website: moltafet.com

Moltafet is an Iranian rap and hip-hop music group. It was founded in 2011 by Hichkas, Mahdyar Aghajani, Fadaei, Reveal and Ali Quf. In the following years, Shapur also joined the group. Over the years, Hichkas and Reveal left the group.

== Activities ==
In recent years, the activities of this music group have predominantly been political. They have focused on criticizing the Iranian government and its suppression of public protests. The members of Moltafet frequently address social and political issues through their music. This has led to some of their works facing restrictions and bans from the Iranian authorities.

In recent years, Moltafet has had numerous members both within Iran and abroad.

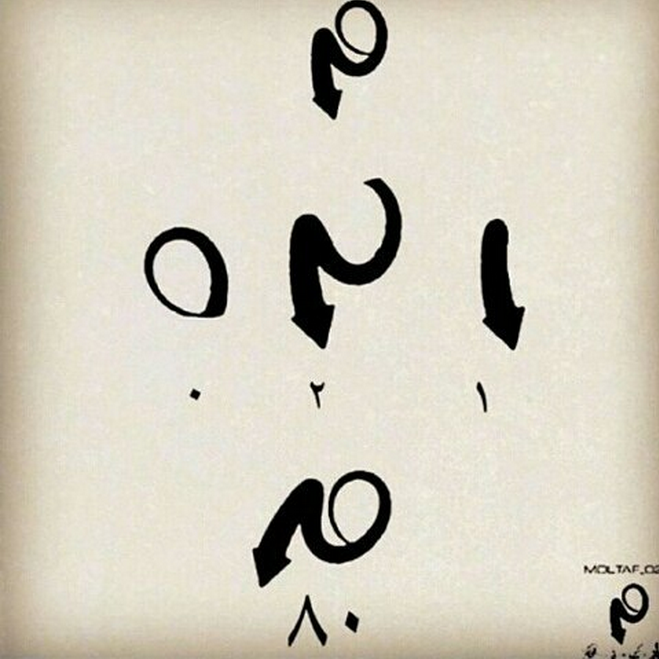
Analysis of the Moltafet label where you can see the numbers 021, referring to the Tehran area code, and 80, which refers to the decade when the group started and the song "80"

The Moltafet music group has had prolonged conflicts with other music groups and various rappers. The group's conflicts with the music groups Zedbazi and Hossein have lasted for several years, with numerous diss tracks exchanged between them.

== See also ==
- List of iranian hip-hop groups and record labels
