= Nouraei =

Nouraei or Nouraee (Persian: نورائی) is an Iranian surname. Notable people with the surname include:

- Bahram Nouraei (born 1988), Iranian hip hop artist and producer
- Nasser Nouraei (born 1954), Iranian football player
