= Nesa Azadikhah =

Nesa Azadikhah نسا آزادیخواه
- Born: 22 May 1984 (age 42); Tehran, Iran
- Genres: Electronic music; Hip hop; Techno; House music; Ambient music; Dance music
- Occupations: DJ; Composer; Music arranger
- Instruments: Daf; Tombak
- Years active: 2000–present

Nesa Azadikhah (born May 22, 1984) is an Iranian electronic music composer, DJ, and music producer. She is a supporter of the Women, Life, Freedom movement, which she demonstrates through her music releases and compilations like Woman, Life, Freedom alongside DJ Aida. In 2024, she was included in BBC's 100 Women series for her contributions to dance music culture in Iran.

== Activities ==
Nesa Azadikhah started her music career at the age of six, playing the Tombak and Daf, and has been organizing underground gatherings in Tehran since the age of sixteen. Nesa is the founder and executive director of Deep House Tehran. Deep House Tehran daily, weekly, and monthly covers the electronic music scene in Iran, publishes music compilations, educational content, and podcasts, and reviews electronic music albums.

She began her professional activities in music at a young age by participating in and performing at parties and gatherings of underground music in Tehran. She is recognized as one of the first female DJs and live performers in Iran. Nesa contributed as a composer in the albums “Khodha” and “Gozaar” by Bahram Nouraei, and she has also composed for plays such as “House, Kitchen”.

Nesa Azadikhah has been a supporter of the Women, Life, Freedom movement, demonstrating her support through artistic and civil activities. She was one of the signatories of the Statement of the Iranian Artistic Community in Support of Art Students during the Women, Life, Freedom movement. She also released the electronic music album “Women, Life, Freedom” in collaboration with DJ Aida. The release of this album led Nesa to leave Iran for Europe in August 2022.

Nesa's portfolio also includes numerous international activities with various groups and artists. As the head of Deep House Tehran Nesa has collaborated with Sama' Abdulhadi, the first female Palestinian DJ, aiming to create a space for electronic music expression in Iran. Nesa collaborated in the exhibition “Every Beginning Is But a Continuation,” a work by her twin sister, Niyaz Azadikhah, and was responsible for the sound design of the videos in the exhibition. This experimental exhibition included animated and static images and designs, along with various pleasant and jarring sounds from life that transformed into a video animation. Niyaz Azadikhah is Nesa Azadikhah's twin sister.
