= Bengard =

Bengard بنگارد
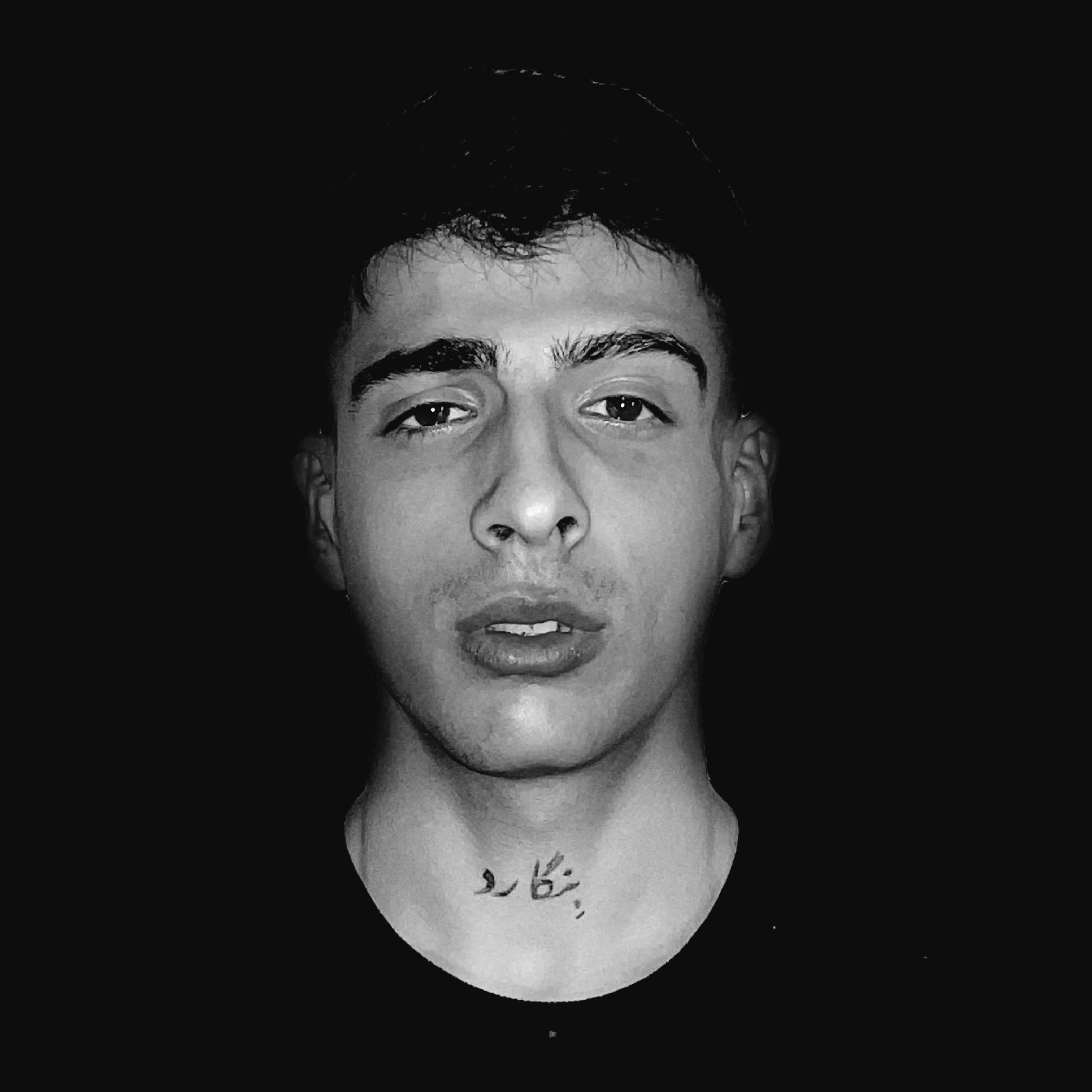

Background information
- Born: Amir Mahdi Rajabi; 11 October 2004 (age 22); Eslamshahr, Iran
- Genres: Drill; trap
- Occupation: Rapper
- Years active: 2017–present

Amir Mahdi Rajabi (Persian: امیر مهدی رجبی; born 11 October 2004), known professionally as Bengard (بنگارد), is an Iranian rapper. He was arrested following 2025–2026 Iranian protests.

== Career ==
At the age of 16, he released a self-composed song titled "God", which discusses personal themes and addresses hardships in his life. Bengard has released independent music projects on steaming services. These include the albums Amir Bengard Is Back (2016), Baroon (2022), Etehad (2022), and XxX Lucifer 013 (2022).

In an interview with Rasanashr, he said:

that rap music is a culture and should not be viewed as entertainment.

== Arrest ==
In 2023, during conscripted military service, he was detained for one month by the Law Enforcement Command's Intelligence Protection Organization following the publication of a video showing a live rap performance. After legal proceedings at the military prosecutor's office, he was sentenced to three months of additional service and ordered to pay a monetary fine of 27 million Iranian toman, according to reports.

Following the 2025–2026 Iranian protests, he was arrested on 19 January 2026 by the Ministry of Intelligence. According to a report by IranWire and Radio Zamaneh, intelligence agents subjected him to physical abuse and psychological torture in an attempt to extract a forced confession, including allegations of arson attacks on banks, manufacturing Molotov cocktails, and physical confrontations with Iranian agents. The report also states that he was subjected to psychological intimidation, including threats such as “Feel the coldness of the noose around your neck.” According to human rights organizations, the physical and psychological injuries inflicted on him were severe enough to cause speech impairment (stuttering) during conversation.

== See also ==
- 2025-2026 Iranian protests
- Iranian hip hop
- List of Iranian hip hop artists
- Music of Iran
