= 1500tasvir =

User account in social networks

+1500 Tasvir
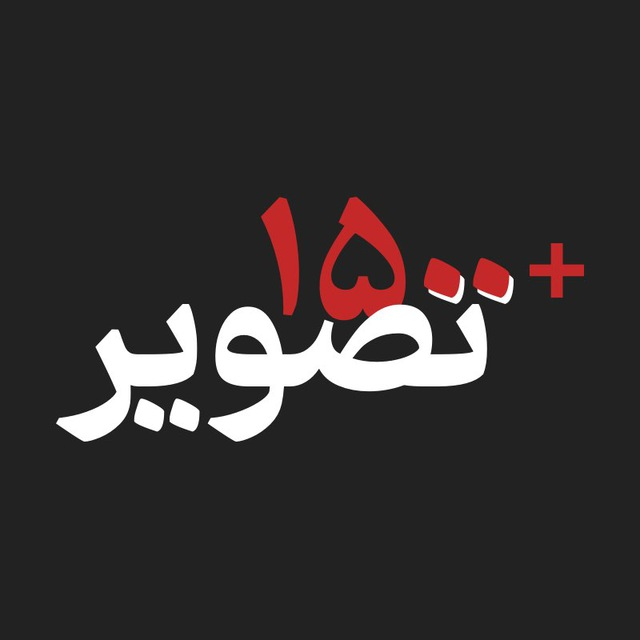
- Website type: User account
- Available in: Persian; English
- Area served: Media activity against the Islamic Republic of Iran
- Services: Accounts on Twitter, Instagram, and Telegram
- Website: Official website
- Launched: November 2020
- Current status: Active

1500Tasvir is a social media-based activist group. The name "1500" refers to the number of people killed during the November 2019 Iran protests. Initially, the account was established to track and repost images of those killed during these protests. However, it later evolved into a media outlet, publishing news about protests in Iran, particularly during the 2022 Iranian protests. Many images and news pieces from this account have been utilized by international Persian and non-Persian media outlets such as BBC, CNN, The Guardian, Deutsche Welle, Radio Farda and Voice of America. In 2026, this account does not have a page on Instagram or Twitter, and their Telegram page has mostly remained as an archive.

== Significant activities ==
=== I Am Innocent ===
Approximately a year after the execution of Navid Afkari, the +1500 Tasvir account launched a series on social media titled "I Am Innocent," focusing on the case of Navid Afkari, Vahid Afkari, and Habib Afkari. This series detailed the inconsistencies and new revelations in the Afkari brothers' case, highlighting that no evidence implicated them in the alleged murder case. Instead, forced confessions obtained under torture were used by the Islamic Republic as the sole basis for Navid Afkari's execution. At the same time as the final episode of this series aired, users launched a Twitter storm using the hashtag "I Am Innocent."

=== Collaboration with CNN ===
A few days after Nika Shakarami was killed by the Islamic Republic's suppressive forces during the nationwide protests of 2022, the +1500 Tasvir account posted on social media, asking people to share any images they had from Boulevard Keshavarz after 8 PM (the location and time of Nika Shakarami's death). Among the submitted images, the last photos of Nika Shakarami participating in protests against the Islamic Republic appeared in a report published by CNN. This report garnered global attention and further exposed the falsified information disseminated by the Islamic Republic.
