= Fadaei =

Iranian rapper (born 1989)

Fadaei فدائی
- Also known as: Gladiator of literature
- Born: Ashkan Saranjam; December 5, 1989 (age 36); Tehran, Iran
- Genres: Persian Rap; Persian Hip-Hop
- Occupations: Rapper; Singer; Songwriter
- Years active: 2009–present
- Label: Moltafet

Logo
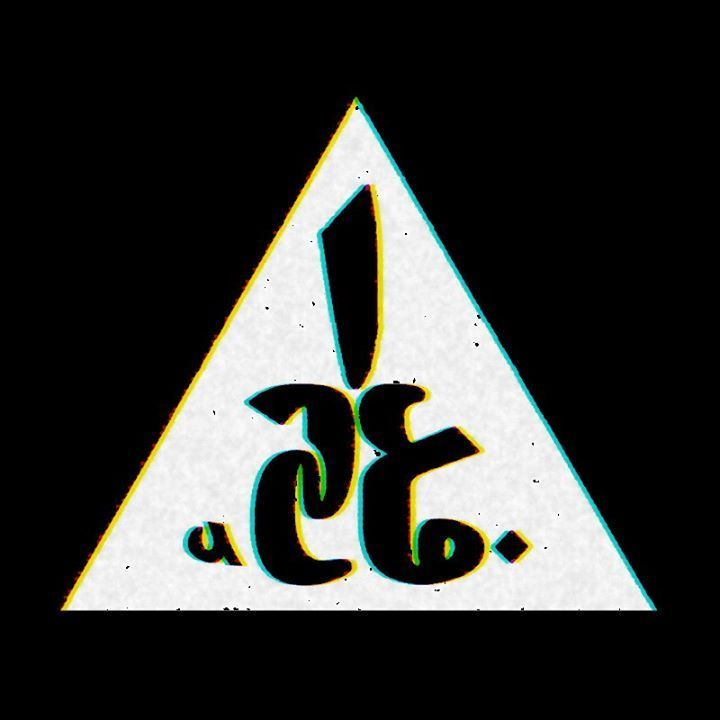

Ashkan Saranjam (Persian: اشکان سرانجام; born 5 December 1989), known professionally as Fadaei (Persian: فدائی), is an Iranian rapper, singer, and songwriter.

He is a member and manager of the Moltafet music group. His music frequently addresses political and social issues and has been described as critical of the Islamic Republic of Iran.

== Career ==
He started his work by releasing "Iran Iran" a year after the 2009 Iranian presidential election protests mentioning the killing of Neda Agha-Soltan and the 2009 Kahrizak Detention Center disaster. After the execution of Majid Reza Rahnavard, he released the song "Taskhir", the introduction of which (the leader's turban is time to jump) became the slogan of the popular protests of the 1401 Iranian uprising .

After Fadaei's quarrel with Hichkas, he is the manager of the Moltafet music group. On the anniversary of the assassination of Mahsa Amini and the beginning of the Women, Life, Freedom movement on16 September 2022, Fadaei released the song "Ma Yademoon Nemire", which is considered one of his best works.

== Discography ==
=== 2010 ===
Iran Iran

- Released: 2010
- Producer: Mahdyar Aghajani

=== 2011 ===
"4. Vāstā Lāshi" from the album Anjam Vazife

- Released: 2011
- Producer: Mahdyar Aghajani

"5. Shak (feat. Ali Quf)" from the album Anjam Vazife

- Released: 2011
- Producer: Mahdyar Aghajani

Saze Ma

- Released: 2011
- Producer: Mahdyar Aghajani

"Miane Ghamhayam (feat. Ali Quf)" from the album Zir O Bame Zirzamin

- Released: 2011
- Producer: Mahdyar Aghajani

Ye Eshghe Noghrei

- Released: 2011
- Producer: Mahdyar Aghajani

=== 2012 ===
Refigh

- Released: 2012
- Producer: Mahdyar Aghajani

"1. Zendegi" from the album Adl

- Released: 2012
- Producer: Mahdyar Aghajani

"2. Sarzamine Madari" from the album Adl

- Released: 2012
- Producer: Mahdyar Aghajani

"3. Chi Shenidi? (feat. Hichkas)" from the album Adl

- Released: 2012
- Producer: Mahdyar Aghajani

"4. Jabe Jadooyi" from the album Adl

- Released: 2012
- Producer: Mahdyar Aghajani

"5. 80 (feat. Quf)" from the album Adl

- Released: 2012
- Producer: Mahdyar Aghajani

"6. Nemidoonam" from the album Adl

- Released: 2012
- Producer: Mahdyar Aghajani

=== 2013 ===
Naji

- Released: 2013
- Producer: Mahdyar Aghajani

=== 2014 ===
Hamseda

- Released: 2014
- Producer: Mahdyar Aghajani

=== 2015 ===
Jenayi

- Released: 2015
- Producer: Mahdyar Aghajani

=== 2016 ===
Mostaghel

- Released: 2016
- Producer: Mahdyar Aghajani

=== 2018 ===
Efrati

- Released: 2018
- Producer: Mahdyar Aghajani

=== 2020 ===
1000ta Maznoon

- Released: 2020
- Producer: Mahdyar Aghajani

Man Kiam? (feat. Hichkas)

- Released: 2020
- Producer: Mahdyar Aghajani

Dige Tablo Shode

- Released: 2020
- Producer: Mahdyar Aghajani

Abi Ghermez

- Released: 2020
- Producer: Mahdyar Aghajani

=== 2021 ===
Koli

- Released: 2021
- Producer: Mahdyar Aghajani

Bilit

- Released: 2021
- Producer: Mahdyar Aghajani

Fatehe

- Released: 2021
- Producer: Mahdyar Aghajani

Sarnegooni

- Released: 2021
- Producer: Mahdyar Aghajani

Az Karaj Ta Langerud

- Released: 2021
- Producer: Mahdyar Aghajani

=== 2022 ===
"1. Moghaddame" from the album Hagh

- Released: 2022
- Producer: Mahdyar Aghajani

"2. Tavaf (feat. Mostafa Miri)" from the album Hagh

- Released: 2022
- Producer: Mahdyar Aghajani

"3. Alef" from the album Hagh

- Released: 2022
- Producer: Mahdyar Aghajani

"4. Malahati (feat. Heydar)" from the album Hagh

- Released: 2022
- Producer: Mahdyar Aghajani

"5. Timarestane Dahe 60" from the album Hagh

- Released: 2022
- Producer: Mahdyar Aghajani & Hekmat

"6. Mehr O Raha" from the album Hagh

- Released: 2022
- Producer: Mahdyar Aghajani

"7. Mage Chi Mishe" from the album Hagh

- Released: 2022
- Producer: Mahdyar Aghajani

"8. Mohajer" from the album Hagh

- Released: 2022
- Producer: Mahdyar Aghajani

"9. Narefigh (feat. Shapur)" from the album Hagh

- Released: 2022
- Producer: Mahdyar Aghajani

"10. Zard" from the album Hagh

- Released: 2022
- Producer: Mahdyar Aghajani

"11. Az Samime Ghalb" from the album Hagh

- Released: 2022
- Producer: Mahdyar Aghajani

"12. Rahbar" from the album Hagh

- Released: 2022
- Producer: Mahdyar Aghajani & Hekmat

"13. Khoon" from the album Hagh

- Released: 2022
- Producer: Mahdyar Aghajani & Hekmat

Taskhir

- Released: 2022
- Producer: Mahdyar Aghajani

=== 2023 ===
Meshki

- Released: 2023
- Producer: Mahdyar Aghajani

Yadegari

- Released: 2023
- Producer: Mahdyar Aghajani

Achmaz (feat. Shapur)

- Released: 2023
- Producer: Mahdyar Aghajani

Faramooshi (feat. Shapur)

- Released: 2023
- Producer: Mahdyar Aghajani

Tehran

- Released: 2023
- Producer: Mahdyar Aghajani

=== 2024 ===
Bolandtar

- Released: 2024
- Producer: Mahdyar Aghajani

Balast

- Released: 2024
- Producer: Mahdyar Aghajani

Kamin (feat. Shapur)

- Released: 2024
- Producer: Mahdyar Aghajani

"1. Beluga" from the album Eshgh

- Released: 2024
- Producer: Mahdyar Aghajani

"2. Khaen" from the album Eshgh

- Released: 2024
- Producer: Mahdyar Aghajani

"3. Ashegh" from the album Eshgh

- Released: 2024
- Producer: Mahdyar Aghajani

"4. Mosallahim (feat. Shapur)" from the album Eshgh

- Released: 2024
- Producer: Mahdyar Aghajani

"5. Migiri" from the album Eshgh

- Released: 2024
- Producer: Mahdyar Aghajani

"6. Atish" from the album Eshgh

- Released: 2024
- Producer: Mahdyar Aghajani

"7. Benz" from the album Eshgh

- Released: 2024
- Producer: Mahdyar Aghajani

Ma Yademoon Nemire

- Released: 2024
- Producer: Mahdyar Aghajani

=== 2025 ===
Mamoolan

- Released: 2025
- Producer: Mahdyar Aghajani

Khodafez

- Released: 2025
- Producer: Mahdyar Aghajani

=== 2026 ===
"1. Iran Iran 2" from the album Rend

- Released: 2026
- Producer: Mahdyar Aghajani

"2. Azadi" from the album Rend

- Released: 2026
- Producer: Mahdyar Aghajani

"3. Tehran Paris" from the album Rend

- Released: 2026
- Producer: Mahdyar Aghajani

"4. Beppa" from the album Rend

- Released: 2026
- Producer: Mahdyar Aghajani

"5. Perspolis" from the album Rend

- Released: 2026
- Producer: Mahdyar Aghajani

"6. Menare (feat. Shapur)" from the album Rend

- Released: 2026
- Producer: Mahdyar Aghajani

"7. Mahal" from the album Rend

- Released: 2026
- Producer: Mahdyar Aghajani

"8. Madar" from the album Rend

- Released: 2026
- Producer: Mahdyar Aghajani

Soghoot

- Released: 2026
- Producer: Mahdyar Aghajani

== See also ==
- Iranian hip hop
- List of Iranian hip hop artists
- Music of Iran
- Persian pop music
- Rock and alternative music in Iran

== Extra links ==
- Fadaei on Instagram
