= Toomaj Salehi =

Iranian rapper (born 1990)

- توماج صالحی
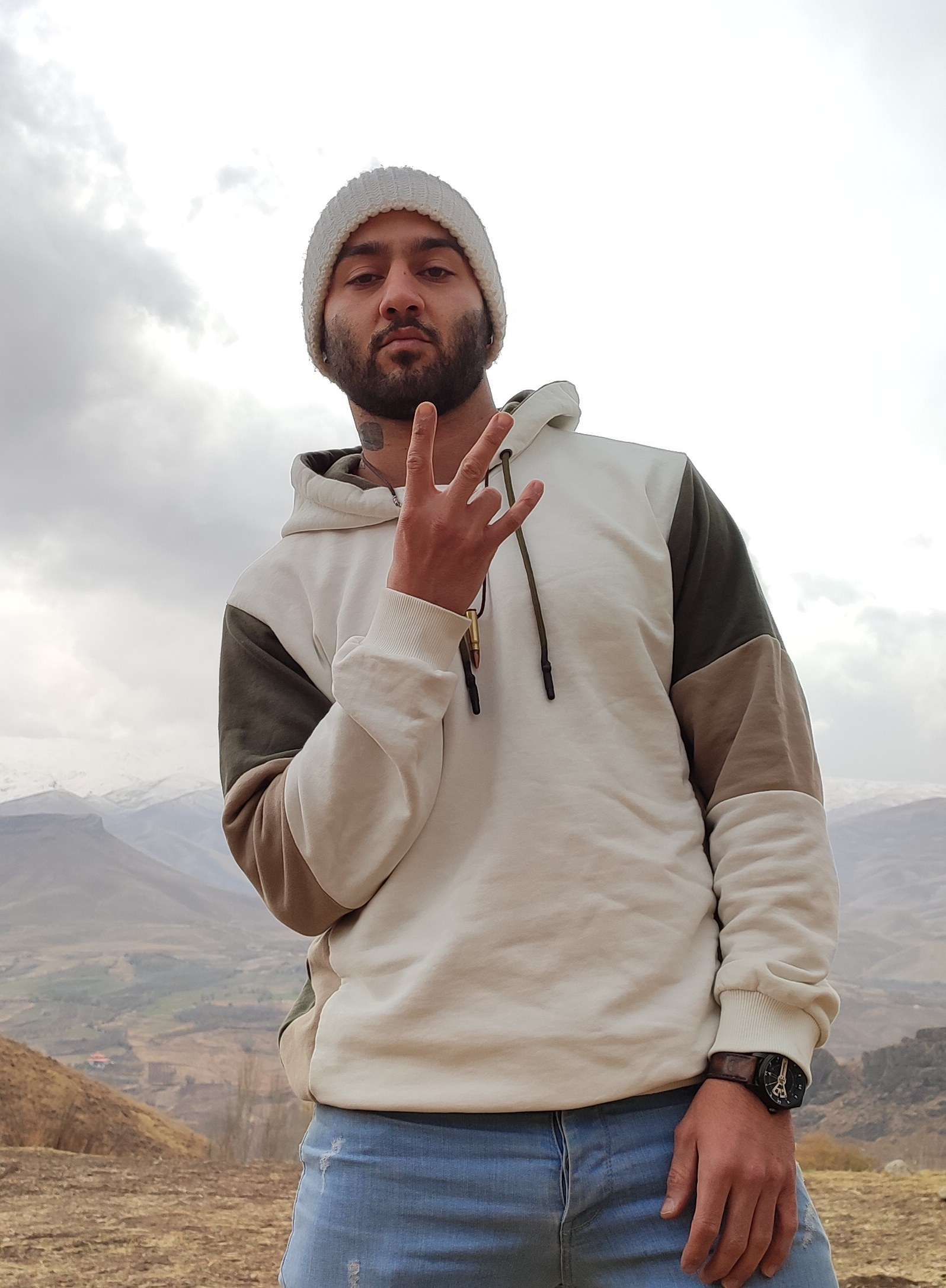
- Born: 3 December 1990 (age 35); Isfahan, Iran
- Criminal charges: Waging war against God; Corruption on Earth
- Musical career
- Genre: Hip-hop
- Occupations: Rapper; singer; songwriter
- Years active: 2017–present

Toomaj Salehi (Persian: توماج صالحی; born 3 December 1990) is an Iranian rapper and activist mainly known for his protest songs concerning Iran's societal issues and the policies of the government of the Islamic Republic of Iran. In July 2023, the Iranian Government sentenced Salehi to six years in prison for participating in the 2021–2022 Iranian protests. On 24 April 2024, Salehi was sentenced to death for charges linked to Iran's 2022–23 Woman, Life, Freedom movement. The sentence was overturned in June 2024, and he was released from prison on 2 December 2024 having served his prison sentence.

== Early life and education ==
Salehi was born on 3 December 1990 and raised in Isfahan, Iran, to Bakhtiari Lur parents. His mother died from cancer when he was twelve. He studied mechanical engineering before joining his father's workshop in the suburb of Ispahan, where he forged metal parts. His parents were working-class, but the Bakhtiari people, an ethnic group, have historically been tribal leaders and influential in Persian politics. Salehi's father was an activist, and one of thousands of leftists arrested in the 1980s, spending eight years as a political prisoner. His mother was also briefly detained.

Salehi was introduced to rap music by his brother, and says he was influenced by Tupac Shakur. He started writing his own lyrics when still a teenager.

== Career ==
Salehi launched his career at the age of 26. At first, studios were not interested in his work as it was too overtly political, but as protests started taking place across Iran, his songs gained traction. He became a hip-hop musician mainly known for his protest songs concerning Iran's societal issues and the policies of the Iranian Government. He has sold personal items, such as his motorcycle, to produce music, as the "rap-e farsi" genre has to take place secretly, being banned by the government. Salehi's targets include political repression, religious pressure, the economy, women's rights, and the corruption of the authorities. Rap is illegal in Iran, and others use pseudonyms to avoid detection, but Salehi has always used his real name. He was barred from performing live in Iran.

His 2021 song, "Soorakh Moosh" ("Mouse Hole" or "Rat Hole"), targets the Islamic Republic directly, as well as Western nations and organisations who turn a blind eye to the oppression, naming US-based lobby group National Iranian American Council (NIAC) in the song.

He openly supported the support for the Woman, Life, Freedom movement and protests, created after the 2022 death-in-custody of Mahsa Jina Amini in 2022. He has supporters within Iran and all over the world, including Coldplay and Sting, for speaking out about human rights abuses, injustice and inequality.

Salehi's day job is working as a laborer at a metalworking factory.

== Discography ==
=== Single tracks ===
| Year | Song |
|---|---|
| 2020 | Moosh |
| 2020 | Dard |
| 2020 | Che |
| 2020 | Nadidi |
| 2021 | Sirk |
| 2021 | Torkamanchaay |
| 2021 | Yaghout |
| 2021 | Tanto |
| 2021 | Normal |
| 2021 | Sir Ta Piaz |
| 2021 | Bazmande |
| 2021 | Farshid |
| 2021 | Soorakh Moosh |
| 2021 | Anar |
| 2022 | Karoon |
| 2022 | Hiroshima |
| 2022 | Noghte Koor |
| 2022 | Nadidi 2 |
| 2022 | Tanaab Dar |
| 2025 | Shab Hamishe Shab Nemimune |
| 2025 | Maa Hanooz Zendeim |
| 2025 | Pileh |
| 2025 | Otaghe Bi Panjareh |
| 2025 | Dorse Abi |
| 2026 | Saale Balvaa |
| 2026 | Sootoon |
| 2026 | Lalaee |
| 2026 | Faro Ri Rumore Del Ratatata |
| 2026 | Pichak |
| 2026 | Azadi |
| 2026 | To Chi? |
| 2026 | Rok |
| 2026 | Mowji |

== Arrests and sentencing ==
Iran's security forces arrested Salehi on 12 September 2021, in his house in Shahin Shahr, near Isfahan. He was charged with "propaganda against the regime" and "insulting the supreme leadership authority". He was released on bail on 21 September, pending a trial. On 23 January 2022, the Islamic Revolutionary Court of Shahin Shahr sentenced Salehi to six months in jail and a fine.

Salehi was arrested again on 30 October 2022, during the Mahsa Amini protests. Fars news agency, affiliated with the IRGC, described him as one of “the leaders of the riots who promoted violence.” The state media also said that Salehi was arrested during a border-crossing, a claim which was denied by Salehi's social media administrator, who announced that he was arrested in the province of Chaharmahal and Bakhtiari, not a border province.

Salehi was reportedly charged with "propagandistic activity against the government, cooperation with hostile governments and forming illegal groups with the intention of creating insecurity in the country". The state-backed Young Journalists Club published a video of a blindfolded man it claimed to be Toomaj who admitted, apparently under duress, to making "a mistake". Salehi was reportedly placed in Evin prison. According to his family, Iranian authorities have tortured Salehi while in captivity.

His last music YouTube video posted prior to his October 2022 arrest included the lyrics, "Someone's crime was dancing with her hair in the wind. Someone's crime was that he or she was brave and criticized... 44 years of your government. It's the year of failure."

On 26 November 2022, the family of Toomaj said his life was at risk after he went on trial behind closed doors.

German member of parliament Ye-One Rhie and Canadian Member of Parliament Jonathan Wilkinson both became his sponsors with an aim to improve conditions during his imprisonment and prevent execution. Tasnim News Agency — a semi-official news agency in Iran — was criticized for disinformation by human rights lawyers.

In July 2023, he was sentenced to six years and three months in prison. He was briefly released on bail on 18 November 2023. During this time he released a video in which he alleged that he had been severely tortured after his arrest, and placed in solitary confinement for 252 days, but had not "confessed". He said that the torture included getting adrenaline injections so that he would not pass out, getting beaten up and having his arms, legs and fingers broken, and staying in a constantly lit cell for more than 200 days. The Department of Intelligence arrested him again for "fake news" in Babol on 30 November, 11 days after he was temporarily released after his bail was paid. His lawyer tweeted that he should have been arrested before Toomaj, that his re-arrest was without grounds and therefore a kidnapping. He was getting media coverage after talking to high profile people and events and other artists. He said that he had sued the court of employees of state and media news and Isfahan Province General Intelligence Department, but the judicial system denied that there ever was a lawsuit.

A new trial was held in a lower revolutionary court; this overturned the decision of the Supreme Court and added new charges, including "propaganda against the state" and "corruption on Earth." On 24 April 2024, he was sentenced to death by the Islamic Revolutionary Court of Isfahan for "waging war against God" and "corruption on Earth," one of the most serious charges in Iran. He was given 20 days to appeal the ruling.

The death penalty in Iran is usually carried out by hanging, with very little prior notice. In an interview with Shargh on 24 April 2024, one of Salehi's lawyers, Amir Raesian, argued that this death sentence did not comply with the overturning of his original sentence by the Supreme Court. There were fears that his health may have been deteriorating.

Raesian stated on 22 June 2024 that the Supreme Court had overturned the death sentence and ordered a retrial, in addition to ruling that his previous sentence was also in violation of rules regarding sentencing for a multiplicity of crimes.

On 2 December 2024, Salehi was released after serving his prison sentence.

=== Support ===
Salehi has the support of many young Iranians, some of whom have staged street protests, as well as the Iranian diaspora. On social media, they have used the hashtag #FreeToomajSalehi. His friend and musical collaborator, a rapper who goes by the name of Afrasiab, released a video in Iran, saying "Enforcing this sentence is the biggest mistake of the century... Toomaj is not just one person. He's a nation that won’t be chained down". Salehi has been hailed as a national hero, even being mentioned by pensioners' protest in southwestern Khuzestan province.

The United Nations called for his release, and a petition launched by the Index on Censorship calling for his immediate and unconditional release was signed by over 100 artists, writers, and musicians including Margaret Atwood, Sting, and Coldplay.

Amnesty International also ran a campaign to save Salehi.

His uncle had also been calling on European and world leaders to intervene and boycott Iran, both economically and diplomatically.

Hadi Ghaemi, executive director of the Center for Human Rights in Iran in New York, had said that Salehi's case "underscores the glaring unlawfulness and injustice of the Islamic Republic's judicial system. Not only was Toomaj imprisoned for participating in a peaceful protest, but now a lower court, acting as a willful instrument of the state's security apparatus, has unlawfully sentenced him to death".

In November 2024, activist Kianoosh Sanjari committed suicide by jumping off a building in Tehran to demand the release of Salehi and several other political prisoners.

== Awards ==
In 2023, while detained in Iran, Salehi received the Freedom of Expression Art Award from Index on Censorship in recognition of what the organization described as his "unwavering commitment to using his craft as a weapon against injustice". Salehi donated the monetary portion of the award to people affected by floods in Iran.

In 2024, while still imprisoned, Salehi was awarded the 2024 Václav Havel Prize for Creative Dissent.

== See also ==
- List of Iranian hip-hop artists
- ‌Mahsa Amini protests
- Detainees of the September 2022 Iranian protests
- Human rights in Iran
