= Mahnam Navab Safavi =

Iranian rapper sentenced to death in 2026

- مهنام نواب‌صفوی
- Born: Isfahan, Iran
- Occupation: Rapper
- Status: Sentenced to death
- Criminal charges: Moharebeh (enmity against God); propaganda against the government; assembly and collusion; allegations relating to destruction of public property
- Penalty: Death

Mahnam Navab Safavi (Persian: مهنام نواب‌صفوی) is an Iranian rapper from Isfahan. He was arrested during the January 2026 protests in Iran and was sentenced to death by Branch 5 of the Islamic Revolutionary Court in Isfahan in 2026. Reports about his case have cited charges including moharebeh, propaganda against the government, assembly and collusion, and alleged participation in the destruction of public property.

== Early life ==
Navab Safavi is a 22-year-old rapper and resident of Isfahan, according to reports published after his arrest and death sentence.

== Career ==
Navab Safavi has been described in published reports as a Persian-language rapper. Coverage of his case has primarily concerned his arrest during the January 2026 protests and the subsequent criminal proceedings against him.

== Arrest and legal proceedings ==
Navab Safavi was arrested in January 2026 during nationwide protests in Isfahan. Human rights sources reported that he was arrested in the Sheikh Sadough area of the city and was subsequently transferred to Dastgerd Prison.

According to HRANA, Navab Safavi was arrested on 10 January 2026. The organisation reported that the case was later referred to Branch 5 of the Revolutionary Court of Isfahan, presided over by Judge Hemmati-Nejad.

In July 2026, multiple reports stated that Branch 5 of the Isfahan Revolutionary Court sentenced Navab Safavi to death. Iran International reported, citing an informed source, that the ruling was issued on charges including moharebeh through participation in the destruction of public property, propaganda against the government, and assembly and collusion.

Hengaw reported additional allegations including destruction of public property and other protest-related offences, and stated that the death sentence had been formally communicated to Navab Safavi.

== Trial and allegations of forced confession ==
Reports about the judicial proceedings raised concerns about the conduct of the trial. Iran International reported that Navab Safavi had two lawyers, but that they had not been given access to the case file or an opportunity to defend him, and that the trial was held remotely.

HRANA likewise reported that his trial was conducted remotely and that it had received information indicating that Navab Safavi had been subjected to forced confessions during detention. HRANA stated that it was continuing to investigate the judicial process, the evidence relied upon by the court and his access to legal counsel.

The human-rights publication Negah also reported that confessions attributed to Navab Safavi had allegedly been obtained under pressure and coercion.

These reports describe allegations concerning the circumstances of the proceedings and detention; the claims concerning forced confessions and procedural irregularities have not been established by an independent judicial finding in the sources cited here.

== Death sentence ==
The death sentence was reported by several Iranian and international human-rights and news organisations in July 2026. The sentence was issued by Branch 5 of the Isfahan Revolutionary Court under Judge Hemmati-Nejad.

The charges reported in connection with the sentence include moharebeh through alleged participation in the destruction of public property, propaganda against the government, assembly and collusion, and allegations concerning incitement to violence. One report also identified writing protest slogans as an alleged act cited in the case.

Navab Safavi is being held at Dastgerd Prison in Isfahan, according to the reports cited above.

== Reactions and reporting ==
The case has been covered by Iranian and international Persian-language media and human-rights organisations. Iran International reported that the death sentence was based on information provided by an informed source familiar with the case, while HRANA, Hengaw and IranWire published separate reports concerning the sentence and judicial proceedings.

Other reports concerning the case have described Navab Safavi as one of the detainees arrested during the January 2026 protests and have referred to concerns about access to legal representation and the circumstances of his detention.

== See also ==
- 2025–2026 Iranian protests
- Iranian hip hop
- Capital punishment in Iran
- Political prisoners in Iran
- Human rights in Iran
