= Chinx (OS) =

British rapper

- Born: Derek Pinto; London, England
- Genres: British hip hop; UK drill
- Years active: 2022–present
- Label: One Side Entertainment
- Member of: OS

Derek Pinto, known professionally as Chinx (OS), is a British rapper from Camden Town, London. He is a member of the UK drill collective group known as OS, also known as 1Side, who are based in the Regent's Park Estate within Camden Town. He first released his debut mixtape, One Sided Story, in 2022.

== Early life ==
In 2017, he was jailed for a possession of firearm more specifically having an unauthorised license of a Walther P38 pistol. And was released on license in October 2021.

He has previous convictions for Robbery in October 2014 and Assault in 2016.

== Career ==
After his release in October 2021, he released his first track titled 'Secrets Not Safe' on Mixtape Madness which hit 1.5 million streams. But due to request by Metropolitan Police, it was ordered to be taken down 4 days after its release due 'Inciting violence'.

He appeared on Fumez the Engineer's Plugged In series which hit an estimated 2 million streams on YouTube as of 24 October 2023.

He also appeared in a Daily Duppy produced by GRM Daily which was further released on 5 March 2023, hitting over 1 million streams on YouTube.

== Discography ==
=== Mixtapes ===
Title	Details	Peak chart positions	Certifications
Title	Details	UK	Certifications
One Sided Story	Released: 24 February 2023; Label: 1Side; Format: CD, Digital download, streaming	61	—

=== Singles ===
Title	Year	Peak chart positions		Album
Title	Year	UK	UK R&B	Album
"Lock & Load"	2022	—	—	Non-album singles
"Absent"	2022	—	—	Non-album singles
"Pretty Petite"	2022	—	—	Non-album singles
"Beware"	2022	—	—	Non-album singles
"What I Mean"	2022	—	—	Non-album singles
"Secrets Not Safe"	2023	—	—	One Sided Story
"One Style" (with OS, (1Side) Fiz, Pepper & R1)	2023	—	—	One Sided Story
"Usual Culprits"	2023	—	—	One Sided Story
"Trap Fashion"	2023	—	—	One Sided Story
"Ain't Got Time"	2023	—	—	One Sided Story
"5AM In North West"	2023	—	—	One Sided Story
"Fish O Filet"	2023	—	—	One Sided Story
"Concrete Jungle"	2023	—	—	One Sided Story
"Check This"	2023	—	—	One Sided Story
"Manager"	2023	—	—	One Sided Story
"Imaginary Girl"	2023	—	—	One Sided Story
"Levels"	2023	—	—	One Sided Story
"Dinga"	2023	—	—	One Sided Story
"Outro"	2023	—	—	One Sided Story
"Cold Road"	2023	—	—	One Sided Story
"Mucky"	2023	—	—	One Sided Story
"Daily Duppy"	2023	—	—	Non-album singles
"Lights Off"	2023	—	—	Non-album singles
"Man Down"	2023	—	—	Non-album singles
"Nervous”	2024	—	—	Non-album singles
“Smoke”	2024	—	—	Non-album singles
