= Farshad Ghanbari =

- Also known as: Ghosty (previous alias)
- Born: January 2, 1989 (age 36); Tehran, Iran
- Genres: Hip hop
- Occupations: Rapper; Composer
- Years active: 2006–present

Farshad Ghanbari (born January 2, 1989) is an Iranian rapper and composer. He began his career in Persian rap in the 2000s and learned music composition through self-teaching and experience alongside his rap career.

== Career ==
Farshad was born on January 2, 1989, in Tehran and moved to Garmsar at the age of three. He began his music career in the 2000s as a teenager in Garmsar. He was introduced to music in 2002 by playing the setar for three years and followed Iranian traditional music, including works by Mohammad Reza Lotfi and Mohammad Reza Shajarian, until in 2005 he was introduced to Persian rap by first-generation rappers like Yas and Hichkas and became more interested in the genre. His introduction to Eminem marked a major turning point in his pursuit to become a rapper, and for years, he tried to emulate Eminem's style.

Farshad officially began his career in 2007 at the age of 19. After some time in the Persian rap scene, he adopted the alias Ghosty and returned to Tehran. His first album, Yek Rooze Kabous (One Day Nightmare), was released in 2009, featuring a narrative-style theme. Due to personal reasons such as depression and identity transformation, he took a two-year break from his career. Before releasing his album Pooch (Void), he permanently discarded the alias Ghosty and continued his work under his real name, Farshad. Alongside his rap career, he pursued music composition experimentally. In 2018, Farshad was selected in a competition organized by Junkie XL for film music composition, which led to a collaboration between the two. His song lyrics differ from the mainstream Persian rap style, which makes his work unique. Regarding Persian rap, he says:

Rappers can depict Iran transparently if they are aware of their cultural and social heritage. However, many are trying to imitate the narratives promoted in Western mainstream media. This means that Iranian hip hop is promoting the flashy and superficial lifestyles common in Western rap. For example, artists celebrate drug use and produce highly sexualized content in their videos.

Farshad believes that any produced work should evoke a change in the listener, and that this change should be entertaining to encourage the audience to listen to the piece. As a result, his works, especially the albums Navasandeh (Writer), Rand (Rogue), and 404, utilize storytelling and the concept album style.

Regarding the criticism that the characters in his albums exhibit excessive depression and nihilism, and that Farshad might be as introverted and defeated as the characters he creates, he responds:

“Confusing the character an artist creates with the artist themselves is a misunderstanding. The character and story created by an artist might be inspired by parts of their own life, but it is not a reflection of the artist’s true personality.”

His song "Black Note" was featured in the TV series The Penguin. Farshad is one of the rappers who, despite the underground status of rap in Iran, still resides in the country.
