= Ghogha (rapper) =

Iranian rapper, lyricist, and artist

- Born: September 19, 1989 (age 37)
- Origin: Tehran, Iran
- Genres: Conscious hip hop; rock; World music
- Occupations: Rapper; singer; songwriter; activist
- Years active: 2005–present
- Label: Peeleh Records
- Website: www.ghogha.me

Setareh Malekzadeh, also professionally known as Ghogha (Persian: غوغا), is a rapper, lyricist, singer and visual artist from Tehran, Iran, currently living in Stockholm, Sweden. She uses modern Persian poetry as lyrical influence referring to some of the Iranian modernist poets such as Forough Farrokhzad and Fereydoon Moshiri. Her lyrics are about philosophy, politics and women's rights. She has performed in a music festival called Voices of Change powered by the National Swedish Touring Theatre, in 2010.

She appeared in a music program called Tracks on Arte Television Network in which she criticizes the Islamic laws forbidding women to express themselves through music.
