= Zedbazi =

Persian hip-hop group

Zedbazi زدبازی

Background information
- Origin: Tehran, Iran
- Genres: Hip Hop; Gangsta Rap; Pop Rap; Rock
- Years active: 2002–2014; 2020–present
- Members: Sohrab MJ; Mehrad Hidden; Alireza JJ; Sijal; Saman Wilson (Founder)
- Past members: Nassim

Zedbazi (Persian: زدبازی) is an Iranian hip hop band formed in 2002 by longtime friends Saman Wilson and Mehrad Hidden, with Sohrab MJ joining soon after and Sijal, Alireza JJ and Nassim joining later. In a 2022 concert, Saman Wilson announced two new members, Sepehr Khalse and Behzad Leito, which was later denied in a podcast.

They are known as the pioneers of gangsta rap in Iran. The band's most popular song is "Tabestoon Kootahe" (2007).

The band split in October 2014 following internal disagreements.

On May 20, 2020, Zedbazi announced on Instagram that the group was resuming activities. On June 10, 2020, they released two singles: "Yakh" (یخ; meaning "ice"), a diss track aimed at the band Moltafet and Hichkas; and "Bache Mahal" (بچه محل; meaning "neighbourhood guy"), about their path to fame since the early days of Persian rap. The songs were released on Radio Javan.

The last song they published under the name Zedbazi was "Tehran Mibinamet", released in 2022.

== History ==
=== Foundation ===
Zedbazi was formed in early 2002 by Saman Wilson (Saman Rezapour) and Mehrad Hidden (Mehrad Mostofi-Rad), who had become friends at high school in Tehran through breakdancing. According to Hidden, after spending about a year outside Iran he returned to find that Wilson had written Persian lyrics over beats by Eminem, including a version of "Without Me". The pair went on to record over songs by 50 Cent and D12 before producing their own beats. Hidden has said that the first original beat he produced for the group was "Az Khazar ta Khalij-e Fars" ("From Caspian to Persian Gulf"), made after a listener accused them of using stolen beats. The group's early songs were recorded at Hidden's home.

Wilson and Hidden met Sohrab MJ in England. He joined the band after collaborating on "Kal Kal" (کل‌کل – Kal-kal, "Argue"), a cover of D12's "Rap Game".

Alireza JJ and Sijal began working with the group in 2005, first appearing on "Berim Faza" ("Let's Go to Space") and "Mal-e Ham Boodim" ("We Were for Each Other"), after Sijal brought beats produced by JJ to Wilson. Nassim first appeared on "Tabestoon Kootahe" (تابستون کوتاهه – Tābestun Kutāh e, "Summer is Short") in 2007. Hidden has said that the newcomers brought a different style to the band: "Our formula was necessary for the inception, theirs was necessary for the continuation."

The name Zedbazi (زدبازی – Zedbāzi) combines zed, short for zākhār, a slang word for a close friend, and bāzi ("play"). According to Wilson, the term arose between him and a friend (not Sohrab MJ) during his first year in England. Zākhār can mean both "an old and close friend" and, used disparagingly, "an old-fashioned and fusty person", depending on tone. Zedbazi can therefore be translated as "the Zakhar acts."

=== Early years and popularity ===
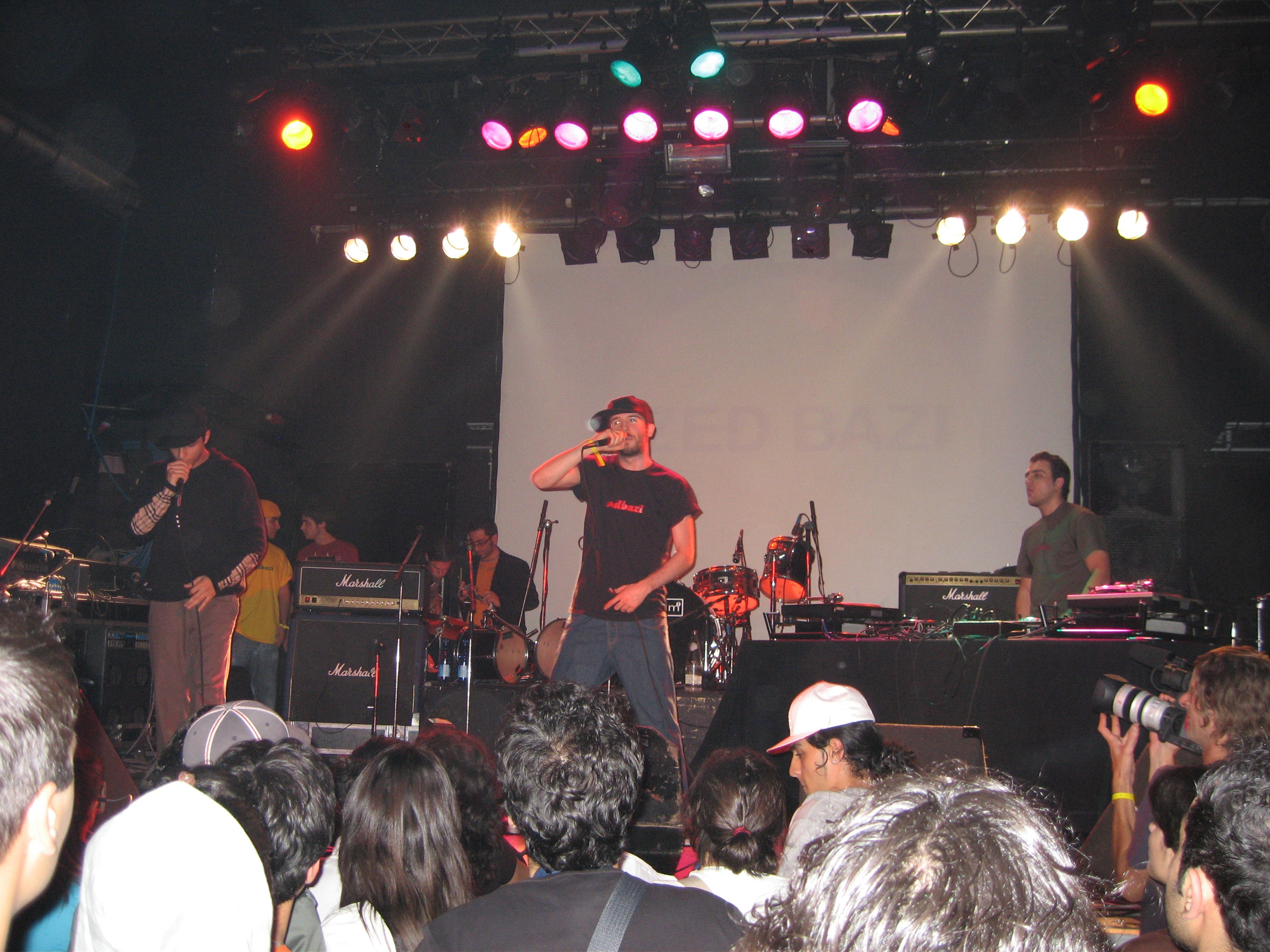
Zedbazi at the Iranian Intergalactic Music Festival (October 22, 2006)

The group initially kept its members' identities hidden. In July 2006, BBC Persian described Zedbazi as one of the most secretive Iranian underground groups, whose following had grown over the previous two years through the internet, in what it reported as the group's first official interview. In the same interview, the members defended their use of profanity as part of rap culture and everyday speech. In October 2006, Zedbazi performed at a variety night at the Café de Paris in London, and at the Cobden Club, on a bill with Abjeez presented by the Iran Heritage Foundation. Until the release of its 2014 documentary, the group had released no music videos and given no on-camera interviews.

Zedbazi emerged at the same time as Hichkas and rapidly gained popularity among Iranian youth for lyrics featuring profanity and depictions of sex and drug use. Several members studied and lived in Europe during this period, which Alireza JJ said gave the group references and a sound that set it apart from other Iranian rappers. JJ has said that Zedbazi was the first group to use explicit language in Iranian music. The group also had a long-running rivalry with the rapper Reza Pishro, carried out through diss tracks.

"Tabestoon Kootahe", released in September 2007, is considered Zedbazi's most popular song. It is about "the bittersweet feeling" of returning to Iran for the summer. The song began as a beat produced by Alireza JJ in Paris; after Sijal played it to Wilson and Hidden, it was developed over about a month with Hidden and Arash Dara, and completed with a verse by Wilson. According to JJ, it first spread through CDs handed out at parties.

=== Temporary dissolution ===
In October 2014, the band announced a separation due to internal disagreements. Hidden later said the split followed disputes, particularly with Alireza JJ, including over ownership of the group's name. Saman Wilson, who had not performed on the band's songs after "Tabestoon Kootahe", joined Mehrad Hidden to form a new band named Bozorg (بزرگ – Bozorg, "Great"). Alireza JJ, Sijal and Nassim continued to work together, and Sohrab MJ worked alone.

=== Return ===
Zedbazi announced their return to Persian rap in June 2020 by releasing two tracks, "Yakh" and "Bache Mahal".

They published another song, "Tehran Mibinamet" (تهران میبینمت, "See You in Tehran"), in 2022. In October 2023, the group was scheduled to perform at the O2 Forum in Kentish Town, London.

== Discography ==
=== Zedbazi ===
The band's first single, "Diss ajili" ("Nut diss"), was released in 2003 by Saman Wilson, the only vocalist on the track. Its main melody is taken from "Without Me" by Eminem.

Until 2012, the band had not released an album, and their songs were released as singles.

Their first studio album, Zakhar Nameh (زاخارنامه – Zāxār Nāme, "The Zakhar Book"), was released on June 4, 2012. All band members except Saman Wilson took part in the album, which featured Hichkas, Behzad Leito and Arash Dara. Hidden has described it as closer to a selection of songs than a conceptual album, and singled out its opening track, "Tehran Mal-e Maneh" ("Tehran Is Mine").

Singles
Title	Year	Member(s)	Album
"Nut diss"	2003	Saman Wilson	
"Our Songs Are Awesome"	2004		
"Party"	2004		
"From Caspian To Persian Gulf"	2004		
"Diss back"	2004	Mehrad Hidden, Saman Wilson	
"Doll"	2004	Sohrab MJ, Mehrad Hidden, Saman Wilson	
"Let's Go To Space"	2005	Sijal, Sohrab MJ, Saman Wilson	
"We Were For Each Other"	2005	Sijal, Sohrab MJ	
"For Each Iranian"	2005	Saman Wilson, Hichkas	
"Be Ready"	2005	Sohrab MJ, Mehrad Hidden	
"Numb"	2006	Sijal, Sohrab MJ, Mehrad Hidden, Saman Wilson	
"Short Summer"	2007	Sijal, Alireza JJ, Mehrad Hidden, Saman Wilson, Nassim	
"Koli Guitar"	2008	Alireza JJ, Sijal, Nassim	
"Dark Town"	2008	Mehrad Hidden, Alireza JJ, Sohrab MJ	
"My life"	2009	Mehrad Hidden, Sijal, Nassim, Alireza JJ, Sohrab MJ	
"Earth's Flat"	2009	Mehrad Hidden, Sijal, Nassim, Alireza JJ, Sohrab MJ	
"Because I Am Crazy About You"	2009	Mehrad Hidden, Sohrab MJ	
"Alley"	2009	Sijal, Mehrad Hidden, Sohrab MJ	
"Iranian L.A."	2009	Alireza JJ, Sijal, Mehrad Hidden	
"Coocooli Koo"	2009	Alireza JJ, Sijal, Mehrad Hidden	
"Open The Door"	2010	Mehrad Hidden, Sijal, Alireza JJ	
"War Casualties"	2010	Mehrad Hidden, Alireza JJ	
"Our Story"	2010	Mehrad Hidden, Alireza JJ, Nassim	
"Like Me"	2010	Mehrad Hidden, Alireza JJ	
"My Dad (Looks At Me Badly)"	2011	Mehrad Hidden, Alireza JJ, Sohrab MJ, Sijal	
"Mysterious Eyes"	2011	Sijal, Sohrab MJ, Alireza JJ	
"Artificial laugh"	2011	Mehrad Hidden, Sijal	
"It's just beginning of our life"	2011	Mehrad Hidden, Alireza JJ, Sohrab MJ, Sijal, Nassim	
"Stop the time"	2012	Sijal, Alireza JJ, Mehrad Hidden, Nassim, Behzad Leito, DJ AFX	
"Tehran Is Mine"	2012	Mehrad Hidden, Alireza JJ, Sohrab MJ, Sijal	Zakhar Nameh
"Pink Cigarette"	2012	Mehrad Hidden, Alireza JJ, Sohrab MJ, Sijal, Nassim	Zakhar Nameh
"Don't Lie"	2012	Sohrab MJ	N/A
"Obi"	2013	Mehrad Hidden, Alireza JJ, Sohrab MJ	N/A
"Neighbourhood guy"	2020	Mehrad Hidden, Alireza JJ, Sohrab MJ, Sijal, Saman Wilson	N/A
"Ice"	2020	Mehrad Hidden, Alireza JJ, Sohrab MJ, Sijal, Saman Wilson	N/A
"See You In Tehran"	2022	Mehrad Hidden, Saman Wilson, Alireza JJ, Sohrab MJ & Sijal	N/A

=== Alireza JJ, Sijal and Nassim ===
On July 28, 2014, the album Pir Shodim Vali Bozorg Na (پیر شدیم ولی بزرگ نه – Pir Ŝodim Vali Bozorg Na, "Got Old But Didn't Grow Up") was released, featuring only three members of the band (Alireza JJ, Sijal and Nassim) and without the Zedbazi record label. It was composed by Alireza JJ and DJ AFX and featured Behzad Leito, Paya, Erfan, Sepehr Khalse, Sina Mafee, Magico and Cornellaa.

Studio albums
Title	Details	Featuring artists	Producers
Pir Shodim Vali Bozorg Na	Released on Jul 28, 2014; Label: Radio Javan	Behzad Leito, Cornellaa, Sohrab MJ, Erfan, Paya, Sepehr Khalse, Sina Mafi, Magico	Alireza JJ, DJ AFX
Pir Shodim Vali Bozorg Na 2	Released on Sep 23, 2016; Label: Radio Javan	Behzad Leito, Sohrab MJ, Sepehr Khalse, Siavash Rad, Wantons (Sami Low)	Alireza JJ, Siavash Rad, Sami Low, Behzad Leito, Khashayar SR, DJ AFX

=== Bozorg ===
The album Bozorg: Vol. 2 (بزرگ: ولوم 2 – Bozorg: Volume 2), by Bozorg (Saman Wilson and Mehrad Hidden), was released on February 27, 2015, featuring Sohrab MJ, Arash Dara, Tara Salahi, Kiarash and Siamak. It was composed by Mehrad Hidden, Arash Dara and DJ Rassek and mastered by Iman Tanha. It has 19 tracks; Hidden said its 18 main tracks represented eighteen years, with a bonus track added later. Two further volumes have been announced.

=== Mehrad Hidden ===
The album Toonel vol.1 (تونل جلد 1), by Mehrad Hidden, was released on February 2, 2017, featuring Saman Wilson, Sohrab MJ, Zakhmi, Arash Dara, Sijal and Canis, with DJ Rassek as a featured composer. Toonel was composed and produced by Mehrad Hidden and Canis and mastered by Iman Tanha. It has 11 tracks in the rock and hip-hop genres. It was sponsored by Bose and released on Spotify, SoundCloud and Radio Javan.

The album Sefr (صفر, "Zero"), by Mehrad Hidden, was released on November 11, 2018, with Arash Rassek as co-producer, Iman Tanha as mix and mastering engineer and Imane as the cover artist. It has nine tracks in the rock genre and was released on Spotify, SoundCloud and Radio Javan. Hidden and Rasekh described it as a cinematic electronic rock album, with hip-hop influences but no rap.

The EP Salakh (سلاخ), by Mehrad Hidden, was released on February 27, 2019. It has six tracks in the new age genre and was released on Apple Music and Spotify.

The album Toonel vol.2 (تونل جلد 2), by Mehrad Hidden, was released on August 14, 2020, featuring Pozx, Arash Dara, Shayea, Saman Wilson, Zakhmi, Canis, Amirali, Sohrab MJ, Tara Salahi and Sijal. Toonel vol.2 was composed and produced by Canis and mastered by Shung. It has 14 tracks in the rock and hip-hop genres and was released in association with Tenzu Music on Apple Music, Spotify and Radio Javan.

The EP Alavis, by Mehrad Hidden and HEEN, was released on February 17, 2021. It has two tracks in the electronic genre and was released on Apple Music, Spotify and SoundCloud.

In 2022, he released Zoozanaghe, a 14-track album made with Moody Mousavi, on Apple Music and Spotify.

In 2024, Mehrad Hidden released Pizza, a six-track album featuring Shayea.

Studio albums
Title	Details	Featuring artists	Producers
Toonel vol.1	Released on Feb 2, 2017; Label: Radio Javan	Saman Wilson, DJ Rassek, Sohrab MJ, Zakhmi, Arash Dara, Sijal, and Canis	Mehrad Hidden, Canis

=== Sohrab MJ ===
Sohrab MJ released his first album, Yeksin, on September 20, 2017. Alireza JJ produced four of its tracks and Khashayar Sr produced the remaining one. Yeksin has five tracks, with guest appearances by every Zedbazi member except Saman Wilson, and by Behzad Leito.

Sohrab MJ released his second album, Zakhare Asli, on April 1, 2021. It was produced by Alisam, Jawaheri, Ali K, Tazad, Cepehri, Mehrad Hidden, Arman Miladi, Alireza JJ and Mr.MP. Zakhare Asli has ten tracks and a bonus track (on physical copies only), with guest appearances by Saman Wilson, Mehrad Hidden, Ali K, Sijal, Amir Tataloo, Arash Saretan, Hoomaan, Sepehr 3NIK, Sepehr Khalse, Sina Mafee, Alireza JJ, Sayan YO, Tarin, I.Da, Maslak and Merzhak.

Studio albums
Title	Details	Featuring artists	Producers
Yeksin	Released on Sep 20, 2017; Label: Radio Javan	Mehrad Hidden, Behzad Leito, Alireza JJ, Sijal, and Nassim	Alireza JJ, Khashayar Sr

=== Behzad Leito and Sepehr Khalse ===
Behzad Leito and Sepehr Khalse were added to Zedbazi by Saman Wilson in 2022, having previously featured on several Zedbazi songs. After their addition, the group was named Z7 (Persian: زِد سِوِن).

== See also ==
- List of Iranian hip-hop groups and record labels
