= Bahram Nouraei =

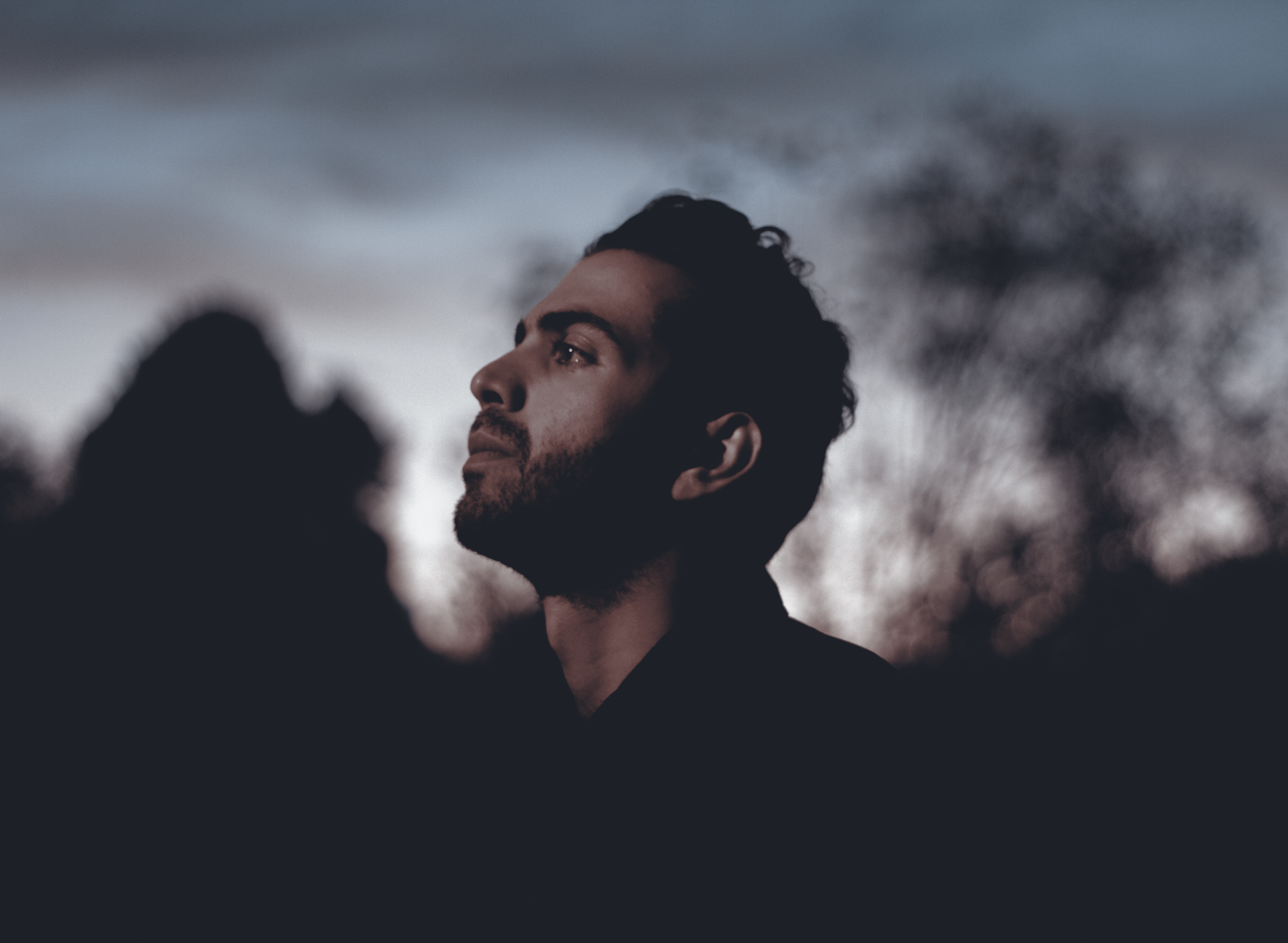
- Bahram August 2016

Background information
- Born: April 25, 1988 (age 38)
- Origin: Tehran, Iran
- Genres: Rap; Conscious Hip Hop; Abstract Hip Hop; Experimental; Alternative Hip Hop; World music
- Occupations: Rapper; Music Producer; Lyricist; Activist
- Years active: 2002–present
- Labels: Peeleh; Divar
- Website: www.bahramnouraei.com

Bahram Nouraei (Persian: بهرام نورائی; born 25 April 1988), professionally known as Bahram (Persian: بهرام), is an Iranian hip hop recording artist and record producer from Tehran. He is based in Stockholm, Sweden.

Nouraei is associated with the Iranian hip hop and underground music scenes. What'sUp Iran described him as one of the leading figures in Iranian underground hip hop and included him among 50 people considered influential in the cultural landscape of the Middle East.

== Music career ==
Bahram Nouraei's first breakthrough hit was a political single track called "Nameyee Be Rayees Jomhour" (in English: A letter to the president) in 2007 which was written in the form of an open letter criticizing the sixth president of Iran Mahmoud Ahmadinejad. His debut album "24 Sa'at" (In Persian: 24 ساعت) (In English: 24 Hours) released in August 2008 containing the track "Inja Irane" (In Persian: اینجا ایرانه) (In English: Here's Iran) which is described as a powerful commentary on modern-day of Iran by Rolling Stone. His second studio album "Sokoot" (In Persian: سکوت) (In English: Silence) released in 2011 containing the first Iranian abstract hip hop track called "Khorshid Khanoom" (In Persian: خورشید خانم) (In English: Lady Sunshine) written in the form of a monologue with the sun in a chronological order.

=== Good Mistake ===
Bahram's third LP album "Eshtebahe Khoob" (In Persian: اشتباه خوب) (In English: Good Mistake) is the first Iranian concept album ever made using reverse chronology as the storytelling method. The album has been commonly produced by Bahram Nouraei and Mahdyar Aghajani and sponsored by Cultures of Resistance Network Foundation. Good Mistake is independently released on 4th of July 2015 and ranked #4 and #6 on Billboard's Top World Albums Chart for the last two weeks of July 2015. The project is also followed by a collection of artworks designed exclusively for each and every track in order to provide visual interpretations for the album.

=== Gozaar ===
Bahram's EP album called "Gozaar" (In Persian: گذار) (In English: Transition) was released at the same time as the Iranian New Year (on March 22, 2020). Produced by Nesa Azadikhah, Ashkan Mousavi and Peymandegar.

=== Khodha ===
Bahram's LP album called "Khodha" (In Persian: خودها) (In English: Selves) was released by Peeleh on April 13, 2023, produced by Ashkan Mousavi, Peymandegar and Nesa Azadikhah. The album dominated all 12 top spots on SoundCloud Hot&New chart.

Bahram has attempted to explore the concepts of "conscious" and "unconscious" through a conceptual album, using Jung's "Theory of Shadows" Employing metaphors such as the "mirror", "pig" and "self", he delves into societal issues stemming from insufficient self-awareness at the individual level, aiming to address them.

== Activism ==
In 2009 Bahram spent one week in Evin prison which houses political prisoners. Bahram was accused for illegal cultural activism but set free. He has also appeared in a documentary film called "Bahram: An Iranian Rapper" intended to present the underground music scene in Iran and explain the Iranian culture after the Islamic revolution. The film was presented in an independent film festival called San Francisco's Iranian film festival at the San Francisco Art Institute (SFAI) in September 2011.

== Discography ==
=== Albums ===
Album	Release date	Track listing	References
24 Sa'at | 24 Hours	August 2008	1. "24 Sa'at"; 2. "Man"; 3. "Khiyaboon"; 4. "Rahe Man"; 5. "Inja Irane"; 6. "Gele Nakon"; 7. "Delnevesht"; 8. "Bikhialesh"; 9. "Afsoos"	
Sokoot | Silence	May 2011	1. "Intro"; 2. "Jalebe"; 3. "Harfaye Man"; 4. "Az Man Bepors"; 5. "Mano Bebakhsh"; 6. "Dar Naro"; 7. "Yeki Tomast Yeki Gorg"; 8. "Nasle Man"; 9. "Be Chi Eteghad Dari"; 10. "Khorshid Khanoom"; 11. "Ye Hes"; 12. "Yaghi"; 13. "Ajib"; 14. "Outro"	
Eshtebahe Khoob | Good Mistake	July 2015	1. "Khoob"; 2. "Saz"; 3. "Lams"; 4. "Naghsh"; 5. "Negah"; 6. "Jang"; 7. "Tekrar"; 8. "Niaz"; 9. "Zakhm"; 10. "Rishe"; 11. "Momken"; 12. "Mordab"; 13. "Sooz"; 14. "Boresh"; 15. "Solh"; 16. "Eshtebah"	
Gozaar | Transition	March 2020	1. "Ghahghara"; 2. "Charkheh"; 3. "Omgh"; 4. "Moghabeleh"; 5. "Adam"	
Khodha | Selves	April 2023	1. "Khodha"; 2. "Naadideh"; 3. "Ye Chizi Mord"; 4. "Khoon"; 5. "Gom"; 6. "Bala Oftadan"; 7. "Ayneh"; 8. "Peyda"; 9. "Birokh"; 10. "Soo Soo"; 11. "Gheyre Ine Mage"; 12. "Madreseye Khook Ha"	
Khoone Khorshid | The Sun's Blood	November 2024	1. "Khoone Khorshid"; 2. "Mahlake"; 3. "Gorgo Mish"; 4. "Shere Bidari"; 5. "Sangsar"	
Heech | Nothing	December 2025	1. "Aghoosh"; 2. "Heech"; 3. "Hamin Gooshe"; 4. "Oon Azadeh"; 5. "Age Biam Biroon"; 6. "Ezterabe Zerang Boodan"; 7. "Siah"; 8. "Matarsak"; 9. "Maar"; 10. "Zire Pooste Shab"; 11. "Chi Mikhy Azam"	

=== Single Tracks ===
Year	Title	Details
2007	Nameyee Be Rayees Jomhoor	{{In Persian: نامه‌ای به رییس جمهور}} {{In English: A letter to the president}}
2007	Ma Ba Hamim	Feat. Reza Pishro {{In Persian: ما با همیم}} {{In English: We're together}}
2007	Paye Kaar	Feat. Nimosh
2007	Marge Rap e Fars	Feat. Tighe & Suchmeh {{In Persian: مرگ رپ فارس}} {{In English: Death of Persian Rap}}
2010	Ino Befahm	Feat. Erfan {{In Persian: اینو بفهم}} {{In English: Realize It}}
2019	Goosht	Prod. Peymandegar {{In Persian: گوشت}} {{In English: Meat}}
2020	Oboor Kon	Askhan Mousavi Feat. Bahram Prod. Ashkan Mousavi {{In Persian: عبور کن}} {{In English: Pass Through}}
2021	Beshno	Prod. Peymandegar {{In Persian: بشنو}} {{In English: Listen}}
2023	Daagh	Prod. HOLLY {{In Persian: داغ}} {{In English: Hot}}
2024	Begoosham	Feat. Bamdad Prod. Peymandegar {{In Persian: بگوشم}}
2024	Na	Feat. Ghogha, Elham Prod. Ashkan Mousavi {{In Persian: نه}}
