= 2022 Iranian protests =

2022 Iranian protests can refer to:

- 2021–2022 Iranian protests, related to power and water insecurity and broader demands for democracy
- 2022 Iranian food protests, related to food insecurity
- Mahsa Amini protests, begun in September 2022 and related to police brutality by virtue police against women
