= Sein Win =

Sein Win may refer to:

- Sein Win (general, born 1919) (1919–1993), Burmese brigadier-general, fourth Prime Minister of Burma
- Guardian Sein Win (1922–2013), Burmese journalist
- Ludu Sein Win (1940–2012), Burmese writer and journalist
- Sein Win (politician, born 1944) (1944–2026), Chairman of the National Coalition Government of the Union of Burma and unofficial Prime Minister of the Union of Burma
- Sein Win (general, born 1956), Burmese lieutenant-general, Myanmar Minister of Defence, 2015–2021
