= Joan Airoldi =

American librarian

Joan Airoldi (1946 or 1947 - 3 December 2022) was the former director of the Whatcom County Library System in Washington state.

== Resisted targeting of library patron under the Patriot Act ==
In June 2004, with the support of staff from the Deming Library, a branch of the Whatcom County Library System, Airoldi refused to provide information requested by a visiting FBI agent regarding a patron's use of a book on Osama bin Laden. The library system informed the FBI that no information would be released without a subpoena or court order. She also led the library board to vote to fight any such subpoena in court. When that grand jury subpoena was eventually issued, the library prepared to challenge it in court, and the subpoena was quickly withdrawn. At the time, Airoldi made this statement: "Libraries are a haven where people should be able to seek whatever information they want to pursue without any threat of government intervention."

== Awards ==
Airoldi received the 2005 PEN/Newman's Own First Amendment Award in recognition of this act. The Deming Library staff were similarly recognized, receiving a Human Rights Award in 2005 from the Whatcom County Human Rights Task Force.
