= San San Nweh =

Burmese writer and journalist

- Born: August 1945 (age 80); Tharrawaddy, Bago Division, Myanmar
- Occupations: reporter, novelist
- Known for: dissident reporting
- Awards: Freedom to Write Award (1995); Reporters Without Borders-Fondation de France Prize (1999); Golden Pen of Freedom (2001)

San San Nweh (Burmese: စမ်းစမ်းနွဲ့ (or) စမ်းစမ်းနွဲ့ (သာယာဝတီ), [sáɰ̃ sáɰ̃ nwɛ̀]; or San San Nwe) is a Burmese writer and journalist. She was jailed for nearly seven years (1994–2001) by the Burmese military junta for her "anti-government intentions". San San Nweh was awarded the 2001 Golden Pen of Freedom, along with Win Tin, in recognition of "their outstanding services to the cause of press freedom" in Myanmar.

== Biography ==
San San Nweh was born on in August 1945 in Tharrawaddy, Burma (now Myanmar). One of the first Burmese women to complete journalism training, San San Nweh was editor of two journals--Gita Padetha and Einmet-Hpu. Since 1974 she has published a dozen novels, over 500 short stories and about 100 poems. Her books include Alone in the Wind and the Rain, Only a Folding Umbrella, and Prison of Darkness.

On 6 October 1994, San San Nweh was arrested, together with her daughter, and found guilty of "publishing information harmful to the state" with a view to "fomenting disorder". She was sentenced to seven years in jail, the maximum provided by the emergency law, and then to a further three years for "giving biased viewpoints" to French journalists in April 1993. She was also accused of "providing information about the human rights situation to the United Nations' Special Rapporteur for Burma". San San Nweh suffered various health problems during her time in prison. Amnesty International named her a prisoner of conscience and campaigned for her release.

After serving seven years of her ten-year prison sentence, San San Nweh was released in July 2001 from Insein Prison, Yangon but has not been allowed to leave Myanmar.

San San Nweh has won numerous awards for her work, including a PEN/Barbara Goldsmith Freedom to Write Award in 1995 and a Reporters Without Borders-Fondation de France Prize in 1999. In 2001, she and Win Tin were jointly awarded the World Association of Newspapers' Golden Pen of Freedom Award.
