= Yndamiro Restano Díaz =

Cuban dissident journalist and poet (born 1948)

- Born: c. 1948
- Occupation: journalist
- Organization: Movimiento de Armonía
- Known for: dissident reporting, 1990-95 imprisonment
- Awards: International Press Freedom Award (1994); Golden Pen of Freedom Award (1996)

Yndamiro Restano Díaz (born c. 1948) is a Cuban dissident journalist and poet who has won the 1996 Golden Pen of Freedom Award of the World Association of Newspapers and a 1994 International Press Freedom Award from the Committee to Protect Journalists. In 1995, the South Florida Sun-Sentinel described him as "Cuba's leading dissident journalist".

== Background ==
Restano began his career as a radio journalist, but an interview he gave to a US journalist saw him spend a short time in prison and then lose his job in 1985.

In 1990, he was a founder of the Movimiento de Armonía (MAR; English: "Harmony Movement"), an unofficial political group which sought "to help through our ideas with the transition from state socialism to democratic socialism in our country". He also acted as the group's president.

== 1990 arrest ==
On 20 December 1991, Restano was approached and handcuffed in Vedado, Havana outside of his parents' home. His detainers, who arrived in a private vehicle, took him to the headquarters of the Department of State Security. Six days later, MAR members Berenice Morales, Jorge Egaña and Iraida Montalvo Miranda were also arrested. Amnesty International declared the four prisoners of conscience, "detained solely on account of their peaceful political activities", and called for their immediate release.

Restano's trial began on 20 May 1992. Standing trial with him was María Elena Aparicio, a museum employee and fellow MAR member who was said to be MAR's coordinator for Havana. The pair was charged with rebellion; the prosecutor alleged that they had violated Cuban law by forming a political organization without government permission, that they had planned to form clandestine cells for the violent overthrow of the government, and that they had produced and distributed anti-government propaganda materials. Both were convicted, with sentences of ten years of imprisonment for Restano and seven for Aparicio. Restano was then sent to Guanajay Prison, Havana Province, to serve his term.

== Release and Independent Press Bureau of Cuba founding ==
During a 1995 trip to France by Fidel Castro, Danielle Mitterrand, wife of former French President François Mitterrand, requested his release along with that of five other prisoners. Restano was released on 2 June of that year, having completed four years of his ten-year sentence, and France-Libertes, the organization headed by Danielle Mitterrand, was credited by Reuters and other news organizations with having secured his release. Following his release, he stated that he intended to continue working for "democracy and human rights" in Cuba.

On 15 September 1995, Restano founded the Independent Press Bureau of Cuba with the support of the France-based press freedom organization Reporters Without Borders. According to Restano, the following day, two colonels from Cuba's Ministry of the Interior met with him for more than six hours, at one point stating, "Someone could kill you, Indamiro. This is the most sensitive area where you are attempting to tread".

== International recognition ==
In 1994, while still incarcerated, Restano won an International Press Freedom Award of the committee to Protect Journalists, "an annual recognition of courageous journalism". Along with Burmese novelist San San Nwe, he was also given the 1995 PEN/Barbara Goldsmith Freedom to Write Award, which recognizes writers "who have fought courageously in the face of adversity for the right to freedom of expression".

Following his release, Restano was awarded the 1996 World Association of Newspapers' Golden Pen of Freedom, which recognizes "the outstanding action, in writing or deed, of an individual, a group or an institution in the cause of press freedom".
