= World Association of Newspapers' Golden Pen of Freedom Award =

International journalism award

The Golden Pen of Freedom Award is an annual international journalism award established in 1961, given by the World Association of Newspapers to individuals or organisations. The stated purpose of the award is "to recognise the outstanding action, in writing or deed, of an individual, a group or an institution in the cause of press freedom". One of the objectives of the award is "to turn the spotlight of public attention on repressive governments and journalists who fight them" and to afford journalists a degree of protection against further persecution.

The Award is presented each year at the opening ceremony of the World Newspaper Congress and World Editors Forum.

Award winners

Year	Winner	Country
1961	Ahmet Emin Yalman	Turkey
1963	Guardian Sein Win	Burma
1964	Gabriel Makoso	Democratic Republic of the Congo
1965	Esmond Wickremesinghe	Sri Lanka
1966	Jules Dubois	USA
1967	Mochtar Lubis	Indonesia
1968	Christos Lambrakis	Greece
1969	The Czechoslovak press	Czechoslovakia
1970	Alberto Gainza Paz	Argentina
1972	Hubert Beuve-Méry	France
1973	Anton Betz	Germany
1974	Julio de Mesquita Neto	Brazil
1975	Sang-Man Kim	South Korea
1976	Raul Régo	Portugal
1977	Robert High Lilley	Northern Ireland
1978	Donald Woods, Percy Qoboza	South Africa
1979	Claude Bellanger (posthumous)	France
1980	Jacobo Timerman	Argentina
1981	José Javier Uranga	Spain
1982	P. Joaquin Chamorro Barrios	Nicaragua
1985	Joaquin Roces	Philippines
1986	Anthony Heard	South Africa
1987	Juan Pablo Cárdenas	Chile
1988	Naji al-Ali (posthumous)	Palestinian territories
1989	Sergei Grigoryants	Soviet Union
1990	Luis Gabriel Cano	Colombia
1991	Gitobu Imanyara	Kenya
1992	Dai Qing	China
1993	Pius Njawe	Cameroon
1994	Omar Belhouchet	Algeria
1995	Gao Yu	China
1996	Yndamiro Restano Díaz	Cuba
1997	Naša borba, Feral Tribune, Oslobođenje	Federal Republic of Yugoslavia, Croatia, Bosnia-Herzegovina
1998	Doan Viet Hoat	Vietnam
1999	Faraj Sarkohi	Iran
2000	Nizar Nayouf	Syria
2001	Win Tin, San San Nweh	Burma
2002	Geoffrey Nyarota	Zimbabwe
2003	Belarusian Association of Journalists	Belarus
2004	Ruslan Sharipov	Uzbekistan
2005	Mahjoub Mohamed Salih	Sudan
2006	Akbar Ganji	Iran
2007	Shi Tao	China
2008	Li Changqing	China
2009	Najam Sethi	Pakistan
2010	Ahmad Zeidabadi	Iran
2011	Dawit Isaak	Eritrea/Sweden
2012	Anabel Hernández	México
2013	Than Htut Aung	Myanmar
2014	Eskinder Nega	Ethiopia
2015	Journalists killed in the line of duty	Worldwide
2016	Dmitry Muratov	Russia
2017	Can Dündar	Turkey
2018	Maria Ressa	Philippines
2019	Jamal Khashoggi	Saudi Arabia
2020	Jineth Bedoya Lima	Colombia
2021	Jimmy Lai, News Department of Apple Daily	Hong Kong
2022	Gazeta Wyborcza and the Gazeta Wyborcza Foundation	Poland
2023	Niloofar Hamedi and Elaheh Mohammadi	Iran
2024	Carlos Chamorro	Nicaragua
2025	Oksana Brovko and Oleksii Pogorelov for the Independent Press of Ukraine	Ukraine

== See also ==
- William O. Douglas Prize
