= Tohti Tunyaz =

Uyghur historian and writer (1959–2015)

Tohti Tunyaz (Chinese: 吐赫提•土亚兹; pinyin: Tǔhètí Tǔyāzī; 1 October 1959 – 29 May 2015), also known by the pen name Tohti Muzart, was an ethnic Uyghur historian and writer who graduated from the history department of the Central Institute of Nationalities, Beijing, in 1984 and was assigned to work for the China National Standing Committee. During this time he reportedly formed a close relationship with former Xinjiang governors Seypidin Azizi and Ismail Emet and was involved in the translation of Eziz's works. Tohti began studying for his PhD at Tokyo University's School of Humanities in Japan in 1995, specializing in Uyghur history and ethnic relations. He reportedly published several papers on Uyghur history in Japan and has published a book in Beijing. Tohti died on 29 May 2015, possibly of a heart attack.

== Arrest ==
Tohti was first arrested by Chinese authorities on 6 February 1998, a few weeks into a trip to Xinjiang Uyghur Autonomous Region for research purposes. His only proven "crime" appears to be that of obtaining and copying part of a 50-year-old document for his research with the help of an official librarian, which the authorities claimed was "stealing state secrets." According to Amnesty International an article published in the January 2001 issue of China's national security newsletter, Tohti Tunyaz “turned his back on his homeland” by going to Japan to study for his PhD, where he “came under the influence of western liberal thinking” and “engaged in Xinjiang minority splittist activities”.

== Trial ==
On 10 November 1998, Chinese authorities charged Tohti with "stealing state secrets for foreign persons" and "inciting national disunity," the latter charge allegedly for publishing a book in Japan in 1998 entitled The Inside Story of the Silk Road. According to the Chinese government the book advocates ethnic separation; scholars in Japan, however, insist no such book exists. He was convicted by the Ürümqi Intermediate People's Court on 10 March 1999, and following an appeal, was sentenced by China's Supreme Court on 15 February 2000, to 11 years in prison with an additional two years' deprivation of political rights.

=== Views against the Court Decision ===
The court decision was based on the supposition that the defendant intended to publish a book in Japanese for the purpose of instigating national disunity, and made copies of confidential documents at Urmuchi in order to leak them to foreigners. However, according to the decision handed down at Urumchi in August 1999, neither the book nor its manuscript was submitted to the court as evidence. As far as his teachers and colleagues know, Tohti wrote no such book in Japan. As to leaking confidential documents, Tohti received copies from a librarian after he had been given permission from the authorities to do so. Furthermore, the foreigner who was alleged to have received the documents was never identified at the trial. Consequently, it can be concluded that the decision was based on a misrepresentation of the facts concerning Tohti's scholarly activities. His real and only intention was to collect source materials in order to complete his doctoral thesis dealing with the modern history of the Uyghur people.

== Current status ==
Tohti served his 11-year sentence in Xinjiang Uyghur Autonomous Region Prison No. 3 in the provincial capital of Ürümqi, and according to English language reports, he was released from prison on 10 February 2009.

According to his friends and supporters in Japan:

1. After his release, he was taken to Beijing to serve the additional two-year sentence (until February 2011) of deprivation of political rights under the strict surveillance of local authorities.
2. Although technically "a free man" and therefore free to return to Japan to continue his studies (where the University of Tokyo still considers him as a matriculating student), the Chinese government has stopped issuing passports to Uyghurs under its jurisdiction.
3. Until his death in 2015, Tohti earned a living as a language adviser for the English language edition of a Chinese magazine, while making efforts to recover his research from the shambles in which he found it after his release from prison.

It is unknown whether his wife, a Japanese citizen, and children were with him or not.

In December 2001, the United Nations Working Group on Arbitrary Detention issued an official opinion declaring Mr. Tohti to be arbitrarily detained.

Tohti was honoured in 2002 with a PEN/Barbara Goldsmith Freedom to Write Award.

He died on 29 May 2015, possibly of a heart attack.
