= Mahjoub Mohamed Salih =

Sudanese journalist (1928–2024)

Mahjoub Mohamed Salih (12 April 1928 – 13 February 2024) was a Sudanese journalist. He was awarded the 2005 Golden Pen of Freedom.

== Biography ==
Salih became a journalist in 1949 after joining the Sudanese independence movement from Egypt. He founded the oldest independent newspaper in Sudan, Al Ayam, in 1958. Twice closed by the Sudanese government during the 1960s, it became a product of it in 1970. Salih did not publish it again until 1986. This was not the end of his troubles with the law, as it was again closed from 1989 to 2000.

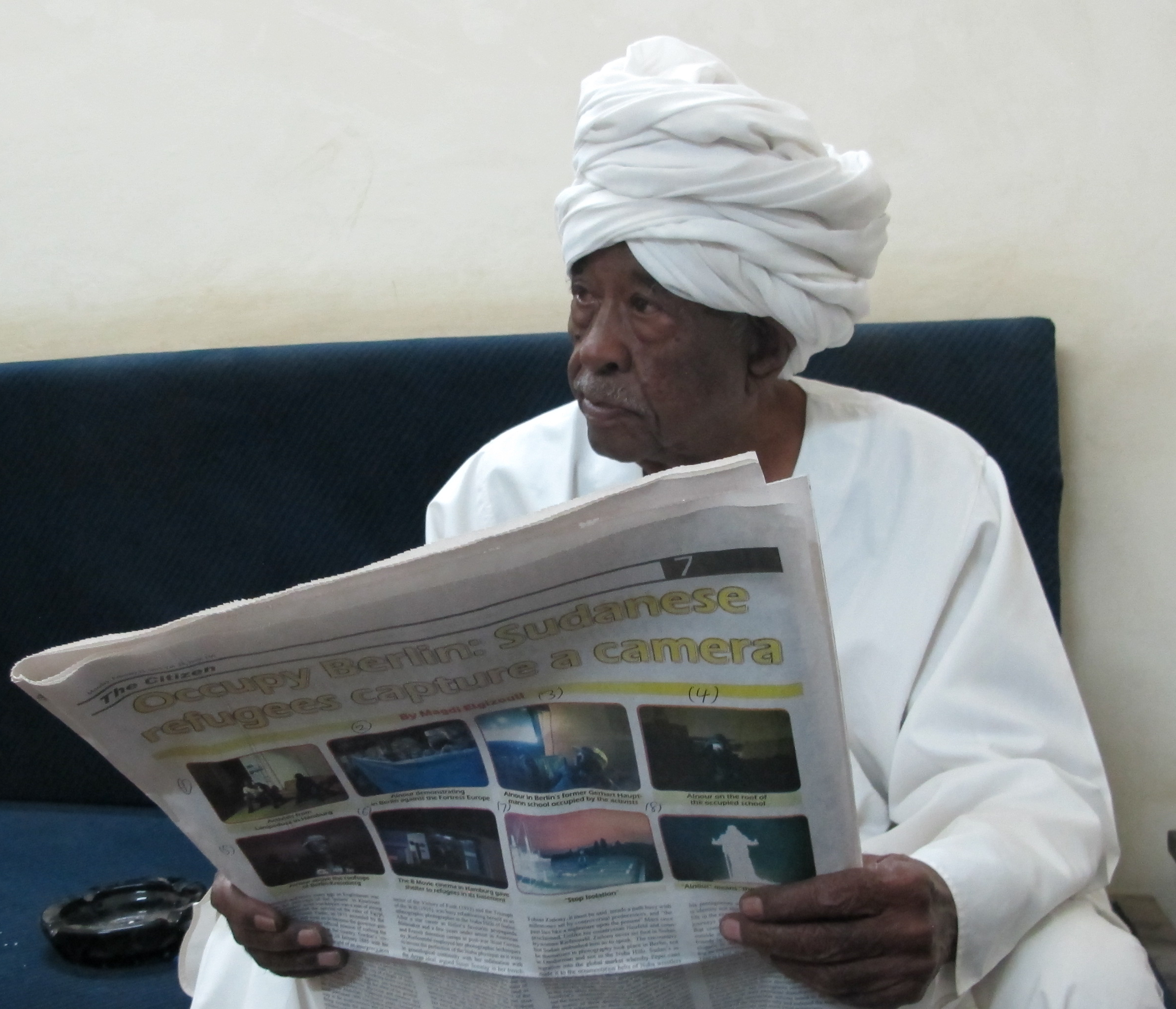
Salih in his office at Al Ayyam newspaper in Khartoum, 2015

In 2003, he began covering the War in Darfur. For this, his newspaper was stopped, punished, and from November 2003 to January 2004, closed down. However, Sudanese authorities claimed it was due to Al-Ayem's failure to pay their taxes. In any case, its journalists have been fined, and sensitive or controversial issues have been confiscated by Sudanese authorities. Salih personally was incarcerated "numerous" times for publishing such issues.

Salih received Golden Pen of Freedom in 2005, during the opening ceremonies of the 58th World Newspaper Congress and the 12th World Editors Forum, the global meetings of the Earth's press. It has been awarded annually since 1961 for the stated purpose of "recognis[ing] outstanding action by an individual, a group or an institution in the cause of press freedom." In attendance of the ceremony were the President of South Korea, Roh Moo-Hyun, several representatives from the diplomatic community, and over 1,300 journalists, publishers, and editors of newspapers in 82 countries.

In July 2005, Sudanese authorities suspended their censorship of the press. A new law was put into place requiring that they have to take the journalist to court, instead of immediately punishing them. Salih became the application of that law, after Al-Ayam published an article seen as demeaning to the armed forces.

In 2015 Salih identified the pressure against journalist in Sudan as having intensified from times past.

Salih died on 13 February 2024, at the age of 95.
