= PEN American Center inactive awards =

PEN/Barbara Goldsmith Freedom to Write Award
- Awarded for: Honoring writers who fought for the right to freedom of expression in the face of adversity.
- Sponsored by: PEN America
- Country: United States

The PEN America Literary Awards have been characterized as being among the "major" American literary prizes. The awards are among many PEN awards sponsored by International PEN in over 145 PEN centres around the world.

Many of the awards once presented by the PEN American Center (today PEN America) are no longer issued, including those listed below.

== PEN/Barbara Goldsmith Freedom to Write Award (1987–2015) ==
The PEN/Barbara Goldsmith Freedom to Write Award was an award that honored writers anywhere in the world who have fought courageously in the face of adversity for the right to freedom of expression. Established in 1987, the award was administered by PEN American Center and underwritten by PEN trustee Barbara Goldsmith. The last award was in 2015; its successor is the PEN/Barbey Freedom to Write Award, established in 2016 and honoring writers who were imprisoned for their work.

=== Winners ===
PEN/Barbara Goldsmith Freedom to Write Award winner
| Year | Winner | Country | Ref. |
|---|---|---|---|
| 1987 | Nizametdin Akhmetov | Soviet Union | |
| 1987 | Matsemela Manaka | South Africa | |
| 1988 | Maina wa Kinyatti | Kenya | |
| 1988 | Pramoedya Ananta Toer | Indonesia | |
| 1989 | Martha Kuwee Kumsa | Ethiopia | |
| 1989 | Nguyễn Chí Thiện | Vietnam | |
| 1990 | Bei Dao | China | |
| 1990 | Jack Mapanje | Malawi | |
| 1991 | Abraham Serfaty | Morocco | |
| 1991 | Francisco Valencia | El Salvador | |
| 1992 | Jean Mario Paul | Haiti | |
| 1992 | Thiagarajah Selvanithy (“Selvi”) | Sri Lanka | |
| 1993 | Zoran Mutic | Bosnia | |
| 1993 | Nizar Nayouf | Syria | |
| 1993 | Svetlana Slapšak | Serbia | |
| 1994 | Đoàn Viết Hoạt | Vietnam | |
| 1994 | Edip Polat | Turkey | |
| 1995 | Yndamiro Restano Díaz | Cuba | |
| 1995 | San San Nweh | Myanmar (Burma) | |
| 1996 | Ma Thida | Myanmar (Burma) | |
| 1996 | Anonymous | Africa | |
| 1997 | Godwin Agbroko | Nigeria | |
| 1997 | Ayşe Nur Zarakolu | Turkey | |
| 1998 | Ogaga Ifowodo | Nigeria | |
| 1998 | Liu Jingsheng | China | |
| 1999 | Faraj Bayrakdar | Syria | |
| 1999 | Eşber Yağmurdereli | Turkey | |
| 2000 | Flora Brovina | Kosovo | |
| 2000 | Xue Deyun | China | |
| 2001 | Shahla Lahiji | Iran | |
| 2001 | Mamadali Mahmudov | Uzbekistan | |
| 2002 | Aung Myint | Myanmar (Burma) | |
| 2002 | Tohti Tunyaz | Xinjiang Autonomous Region, China | |
| 2003 | Bernardo Arévalo Padrón | Cuba | |
| 2003 | Zouhair Yahyaoui | Tunisia | |
| 2004 | Lê Chí Quang | Vietnam | |
| 2004 | Nasser Zarafshan | Iran | |
| 2005 | Ali al Domaini | Saudi Arabia | |
| 2005 | Deyda Hydara | Gambia | |
| 2006 | Mohammad Benchicou | Algeria | |
| 2006 | Rakhim Esenov | Turkmenistan | |
| 2007 | Normando Hernández González | Cuba | |
| 2008 | Yang Tongyan | China | |
| 2009 | Liu Xiaobo | China | |
| 2010 | Nay Phone Latt | Burma | |
| 2011 | Nasrin Sotoudeh | Iran | |
| 2012 | Eskinder Nega | Ethiopia | |
| 2013 | Ayşe Berktay | Turkey | |
| 2014 | Ilham Tohti | Xinjiang Autonomous Region, China | |
| 2015 | Khadija Ismayilova | Azerbaijan | |

== PEN/Steven Kroll Award (2012–2014) ==
The PEN/Steven Kroll Award was awarded by the PEN American Center "to acknowledge the distinct literary contributions of picture book writers." Established in memory of Steven Kroll, a former PEN Trustee and Chair of PEN's Children's/Young Adult Book Authors Committee, this honor was awarded for the first time in 2012 for a book published in 2011. The last award was given in 2014.

=== Winners ===
PEN/Steven Kroll Award winners
| Year | Author | Title | Ref. |
|---|---|---|---|
| 2012 | Patricia C. McKissack | Never Forgotten | |
| 2013 | Michelle Markel | The Fantastic Jungles of Henri Rousseau | |
| 2014 | Bil Lepp | The King of Little Things | |

== PEN/W.G. Sebald Award (2010–2011) ==
The PEN/W.G. Sebald Award for a Fiction Writer in Mid-Career was awarded by the PEN American Center to honor a promising writer who has published three works of fiction.

=== Winners ===
PEN/W.G. Sebald Award winners
| Year | Author | Ref. |
|---|---|---|
| 2010 | Susan Choi | |
| 2011 | Aleksander Hemon | |

== PEN Emerging Writers Awards (2011) ==
The PEN Emerging Writers Awards was awarded by the PEN American Center. It was awarded to up-and-coming authors whose writing had been featured in distinguished literary journals, but had not published book-length works. Three prizes were awarded: one fiction, one nonfiction, and one poetry. Candidates were nominated only by editors from print and online journals. Participating journals for 2011 included: 6 x 6, A Public Space, Bloom, Colorado Review, Creative Nonfiction, Fence, Gargoyle, Glimmer Train, Guernica, Harvard Review, jubilat, Kenyon Review, Lungfull!, New York Quarterly, One Story, The Oxford American, Ploughshares, Rain Taxi, Spinning Jenny, and Tin House.

=== Winners ===
PEN Emerging Writers Awards winners
| Year | Category | Author | Ref. |
|---|---|---|---|
| 2011 | Fiction | Adam Day | |
| 2011 | Poetry | Smith Henderson | |
| 2011 | Nonfiction | David Stuart McLean | |

== PEN/Amazon.com Short Story Award (2000) ==
The PEN/Amazon.com Short Story Award was given to unpublished writers who submit original short story manuscripts. Each manuscript competed for a $10,000 cash grant and publication at Amazon.com and in The Boston Book Review. Award was active for one year.

== Architectural Digest Award for Literary Writing on the Visual Arts (2000–2001) ==
The Architectural Digest Award for Literary Writing on the Visual Arts was presented for literary writing on the visual arts. It was active two years 2000–2001.

== Gregory Kolovakos Award (1992–2004) ==
The Gregory Kolovakos Award was a literary award given every three years by PEN American Center to a U.S. literary translator, editor, or critic "whose work, in meeting the challenge of cultural difference, extends Gregory Kolovakos's commitment to the richness of Hispanic literature and to expanding its English-language audience". It was primarily intended to recognize translations into English from Spanish, but translations from other Hispanic languages were also eligible. Gregory Kolovakos was a graduate of Yale University and served as the director of the Literature Program of the New York State Council on the Arts for many years. He was also the founding executive director of the Gay and Lesbian Alliance Against Defamation in 1985. The monetary amount of the Award was USD $2000. The prize was first given in 1992.

=== Winners ===
Gregory Kolovakos Award winners
| Year | Author |
|---|---|
| 1992 | Eliot Weinberger |
| 1998 | Johannes Wilbert |
| 2001 | Gregory Rabassa |
| 2001 | Alastair Reid |
| 2004 | Cola Franzen |
| 2004 | Robert M. Laughlin |
| 2004 | Alexander Taylor |

== Jerard Fund Award (2001–2005) ==
The Jerard Fund Award honored a work in progress of general nonfiction distinguished by high literary quality by a woman at the midpoint in her career. Presented every 2 years, it was active from 2001 to 2005.

== Martha Albrand Award for the Art of the Memoir (1998–2006) ==
The Martha Albrand Award for the Art of the Memoir was presented for a first published memoir. It was active from 1998 to 2006.

== Martha Albrand Award for First Nonfiction (1989–2006) ==
The Martha Albrand Award for First Nonfiction was presented for an American author's first-published book of general nonfiction. It was active from 1989 to 2006.

== PEN/Newman's Own First Amendment Award (1993–2006) ==
The PEN/Newman's Own First Amendment Award was an award presented annually from 1993 to 2006 to a U.S. resident who "fought courageously, despite adversity, to safeguard the First Amendment right to freedom of expression as it applies to the written word." Sponsored by PEN American Center and Newman's Own, a cash prize of $20,000 was awarded. It was active from 1993 to 2006.

=== Winners ===
PEN/Newman's Own First Amendment Award winners
| Year | Author | Description | Ref. |
|---|---|---|---|
| 1993 | Claudia Johnson | Restored literary classics - including Steinbeck's Of Mice and Men, Chaucer's The Miller's Tale, and Aristophanes's Lysistrata — that had been banned from Florida classrooms; defended student production of A Raisin in the Sun. | |
| 1994 | Carole Marlowe | Arizona drama teacher who resisted district censorship of a play selected for student production. | |
| 1995 | Joyce Meskis | Denver bookstore owner who successfully challenged a Colorado law barring stores open to children from selling novels and art books with sexual content, and who continued to sell Salman Rushdie's The Satanic Verses in 1989, donating 25% of proceeds to anticensorship organizations. | |
| 1996 | Cissy Lacks | Missouri high school Creative Writing teacher fired for "failure to censor her students' creative expression." | |
| 1997 | Nancy Hsu Fleming | Defeated a corporation's attempt to silence her written concerns about possible groundwater contamination caused by a local landfill. | |
| 1998 | Terrilyn Simpson | Maine writer and journalist harassed for her attempts to cover local industrial health hazards. | |
| 1999 | Releah Lent | Florida high school teacher and student newspaper advisor who has struggled to defend literature in the classroom and press freedom for students. | |
| 2000 | William Holda | President, Kilgore College, who defended the production of Tony Kushner's play Angels in America in Kilgore, Texas. | |
| 2001 | Deloris Wilson | High school librarian in West Monroe, Louisiana who fought to preserve access to library materials banned for sexual content. | |
| 2001 | Alberto Sarrain | Cuban-émigré theater producer who challenged Miami-Dade County's ban on public funding to arts organizations performing work by artists currently living in Cuba. | |
| 2002 | Vanessa Leggett | Freelance writer who was jailed in a federal detention center in Texas for 168 days for refusing to bow to a sweeping subpoena of confidential source materials. | |
| 2003 | Jerilynn Adams Williams | Texas librarian who successfully turned back an attempt to remove books from circulation at Montgomery County public libraries. | |
| 2004 | Barbara Parsons Lane | One of eight incarcerated writers who were sued by the State of Connecticut after contributing to Couldn't Keep It To Myself: Testimonies from our Imprisoned Sisters, a moving anthology of stories and essays by women who participated in a creative writing workshop led by Wally Lamb at York Correctional Institute. | |
| 2005 | Joan Airoldi | Librarian and library director in rural Washington state who challenged an FBI effort to search patron records under the Library Awareness Program. | |
| 2006 | Sibel Edmonds | Translator who was fired from her job at the FBI after complaining of intelligence failures and poor performance in her unit. | |

== PEN/Katherine Anne Porter First Amendment Award (2008) ==
The PEN/Katherine Anne Porter First Amendment Award was presented for only one year. It was meant to given to a U.S. resident "who has fought courageously, despite adversity, to safeguard the First Amendment right to freedom of expression as it applies to the written word." Sponsored by PEN American Center and Katherine Anne Porter Foundation, the award included a cash prize of US$10,000. The award succeeded the PEN/Newman's Own First Amendment Award which was last awarded in 2006. The award was given in 2008 only.

=== Winner ===
| Year | Author | Description | Ref. |
|---|---|---|---|
| 2008 | Laura Berg | Psychiatric nurse at a Veterans Affairs hospital who faced an investigation into possible charges of sedition when she wrote a letter to the editor of her local newspaper which was critical of George W. Bush. | |

== Renato Poggioli Translation Award (1991–2000) ==
The Renato Poggioli Translation Award was for a translator at work on an English-language version of Italian literature. Active from 1991 to c. 2000.

== Roger Klein Award for Career Achievement (1971–2000) ==
The Roger Klein Award for Career Achievement was presented to a trade book editor every two years for "distinguished editorial achievement." It was active from 1971 to c. 2000. |To a trade book editor every two years for "distinguished editorial achievement."

== Roger Klein Award for Editing ==
The Roger Klein Award for Editing was an honor "given [every two years] to an outstanding editor in trade hardcover publishing." It was active from 1971 to c. 2000.
