= Adam Day =

American poet and critic

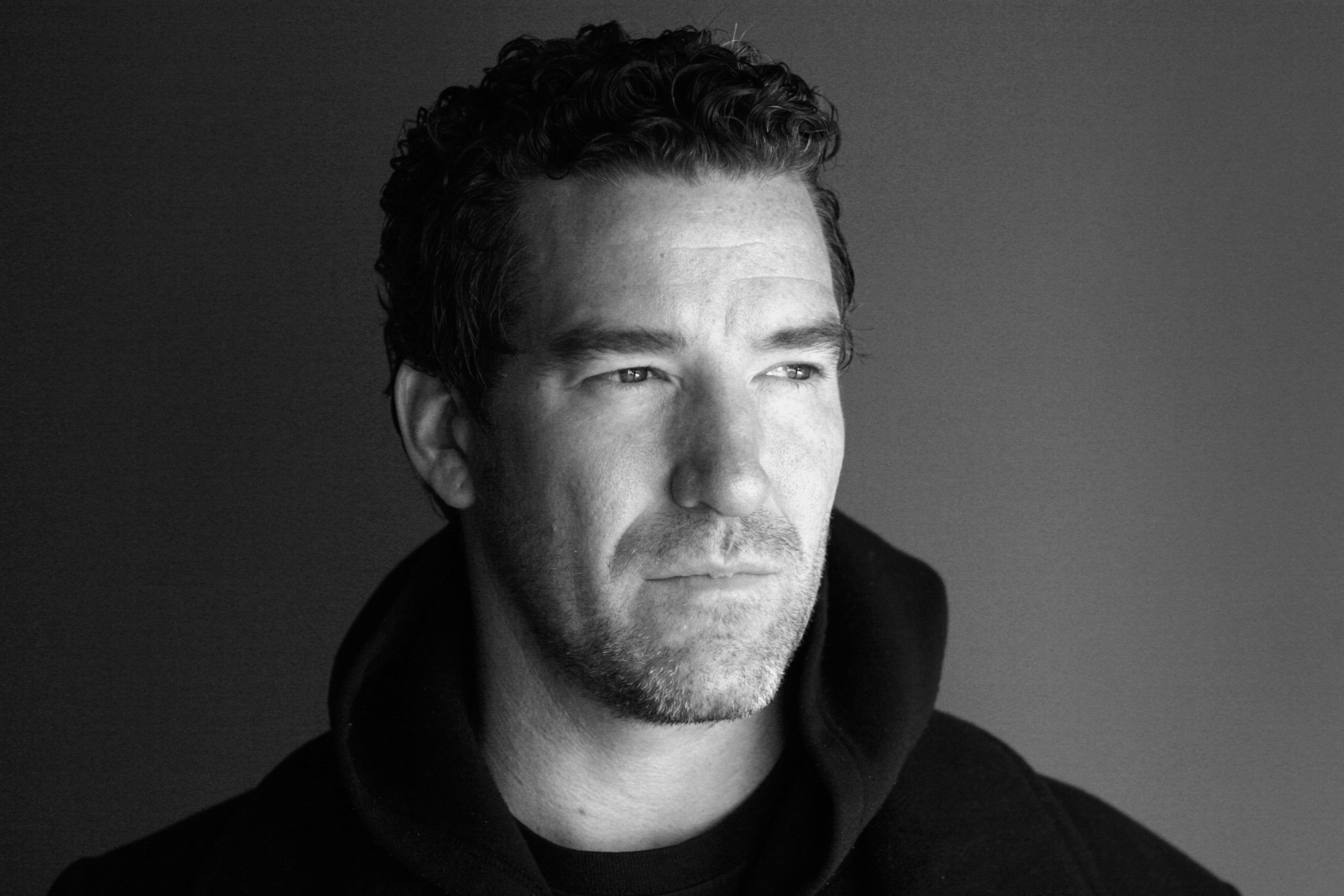
- Day in 2015
- Born: Louisville, Kentucky
- Education: New York University
- Occupations: Poet and critic
- Organization: Baltic Writing Residency
- Notable work: The Strategic Crescent; Illuminated Edges; Left-Handed Wolf; Model of a City in Civil War; Badger, Apocrypha

Adam Day is an American poet and critic. He is the author of American Elision (Louisiana State University Press, 2027), The Strategic Crescent (Broadstone Books, 2025), Illuminated Edges (Kelsay Books, 2024), Left-Handed Wolf (Louisiana State University Press, 2020), Model of a City in Civil War (Sarabande Books, 2015), and one chapbook of poetry, Badger, Apocrypha (Poetry Society of America, 2011).

== Life and work ==
Day was born and raised primarily in Louisville's working class south end. He graduated from Eckerd College (2001), and from New York University (2004) with an MFA in creative writing.

Day publishes Action, Spectacle, an online and print journal of art and culture, which is guest-edited by a changing lineup of writers and artists. He also publishes Action, Spectacle Press, which publishes chapbooks of prose and of poetry, and full-length books of poetry.

He has taught English and creative writing at Earlham College, New York University, Bellarmine University, the University of Houston, the University of Kentucky, and elsewhere.

In 2011, Day was selected by David Lehman for the PEN Emerging Writers Award. Lehman wrote, "Day is unafraid to conjoin historical and fictional personages for effects that startle and provoke, as in Combine, in which Stalin, Goya, Queen Anne, and Tennessee Williams are among the cast of characters. Impressive, too, is the poem in which Day juxtaposes excerpts 'From an Interview with Kenzaburō Ōe, with Stage Directions from Synge's Riders to the Sea.' This poet's technical prowess, adventurousness, and wide-ranging curiosity give pleasure now and the promise of a great deal more to come."

== Honors and awards ==
- Al Smith Fellowship from the Kentucky Arts Council
- PEN Emerging Writers Award
- Poetry Society of America Chapbook Fellowship for Badger, Apocrypha

== Collections of poetry ==
- American Elision (Louisiana State University Press, 2027),
- The Strategic Crescent (Broadstone Books, 2025),
- Illuminated Edges (Kelsay Books, 2024),
- Left-Handed Wolf (Louisiana State University Press, 2020),
- Model of a City in Civil War. (Sarabande Books, 2015),
- Badger, Apocrypha. (Poetry Society of America, 2010).
