= Bellingham Public Library =

Public library system in Washington

- 48°45′15″N 122°28′45″W
- Location: Bellingham, Washington, US
- Type: Public library
- Established: June 15, 1891
- Branches: 4

Collection
- Size: 250,089 items

Access and use
- Circulation: 1.5 million
- Population served: 90,665
- Members: 46,590

Other information
- Director: Rebecca Judd
- Website: bellinghampubliclibrary.org
- References: Washington Public Library Statistical Report, 2016

The Bellingham Public Library is a public library system serving Bellingham, Washington, US. It maintains four libraries, one in the Civic Center of downtown Bellingham, one in Fairhaven, one in Barkley Village, and one in the Cordata neighborhood, inside Bellis Fair Mall. The system is independent of the Whatcom County Library System, serving the entire county, but has a reciprocal borrowing agreement.

== History ==
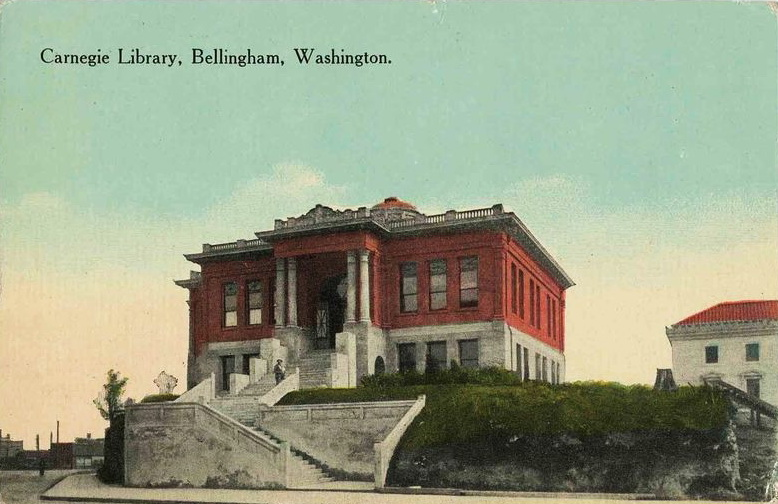
Downtown Bellingham's Carnegie library was demolished in the early 1950s

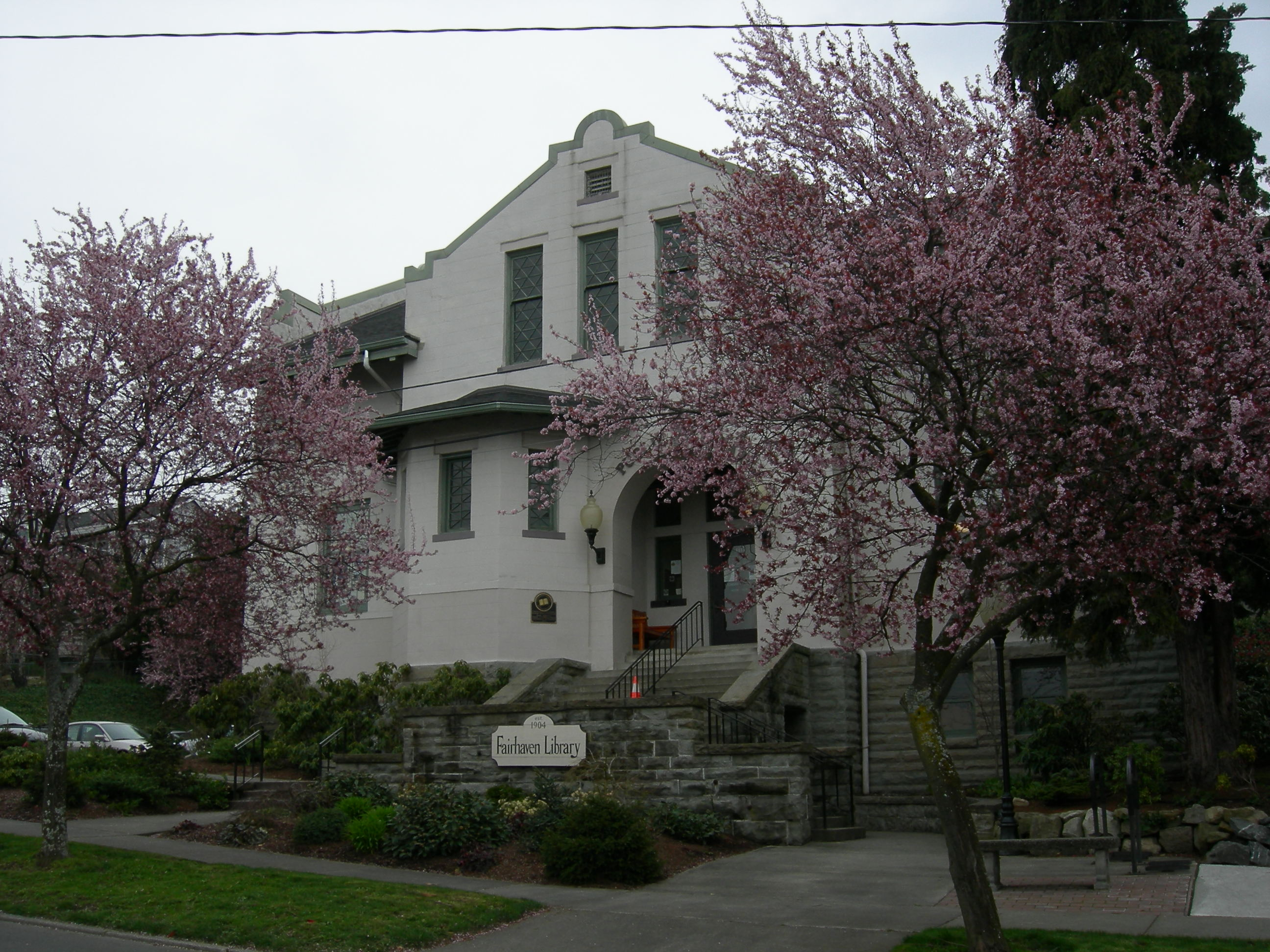
Fairhaven Library, constructed in 1905, is still in service

Bellingham Bay Public Library and Fairhaven Library were originally established separately in the early 1890s. Bellingham Bay Library opened on June 15, 1891, as a subscription library and became a free library in 1903. In 1906, the city of Bellingham received funds from the Carnegie Corporation for a permanent building, which was constructed in 1908 and used until 1951, when the current Central Branch library building was opened.

The Fairhaven Library also began as a subscription library in 1890. Fairhaven Library received funds from the Carnegie Corporation for a permanent building, which was completed in 1905 and is used to this day. The Central Library and Fairhaven Library were consolidated into one library system in 1903, when the towns of Fairhaven and Whatcom joined to form Bellingham.

== Branches ==
The Bellingham Central Library opened on August 19, 1951, replacing the now demolished Carnegie library. In 2007, the library board recommended the replacement and demolition of the central library, citing its inefficiency and lack of space. The central branch was renovated in 1985 and 2020; a third major renovation is planned to begin in 2025 using funding from the American Rescue Plan Act.

The Fairhaven branch opened on December 20, 1904, having used $15,500 in donations from Andrew Carnegie. A third branch at Silver Beach was opened in 1924 and operated until 1975. A branch was opened at Barkley Village on September 13, 2008, located underneath a condominium complex in space donated by the private developer. A fourth branch was opened on April 28, 2023, inside Bellis Fair Mall, as part of a two-year pilot project to establish library services on the north side of Bellingham.

== Services ==
As of 2016, Bellingham Public Library circulates 1.5 million items each year and has over 46,000 registered cardholders. In 2008, Bellingham's per capita circulation was 18.7–the highest rate for libraries of its size in Washington state.

Bellingham Public Library hosts a number of special events throughout the year, including weekly storytime events for children, author appearances, adult literacy tutoring, and family and community outreach events. The library also offers readers' advisory talks and materials to assist patrons in selection of materials from the collection. The library has annual community reading and book discussion programs, including the Summer Reading Program and Whatcom READS. Bellingham Public Library maintains special collections in genealogy and local Northwest Washington history. There are also special services for Adult Basic Education, as well as a circulating collection of kits for reading groups.

== Collaboration ==
In addition to the four branches operated by the Bellingham Public Library system, materials can also be checked out and returned at Whatcom Community College Library. The Bellingham Public Library system also maintains a reciprocal borrowing agreement with Whatcom County Library System. In 2010, Bellingham Public Library became a partner with other library systems in "Whatcom Libraries Collaborate". This program allows a cardholder from any of the six library systems (including academic and public libraries) located in Whatcom County to borrow materials from any other member library.

Bellingham Public Library is a sponsor of the "Whatcom READS!" program, together with Whatcom County Library System, Bellingham Technical College Library, Whatcom Community College Library, Western Washington University Library, and other local organizations. This program is modeled after the "If All Seattle Read the Same Book" project initiated by librarian Nancy Pearl, and consists of a series of discussion groups and author events focusing on one particular book, which brings the community together through literature.
