= Tomas Brunegård =

Swedish businessman

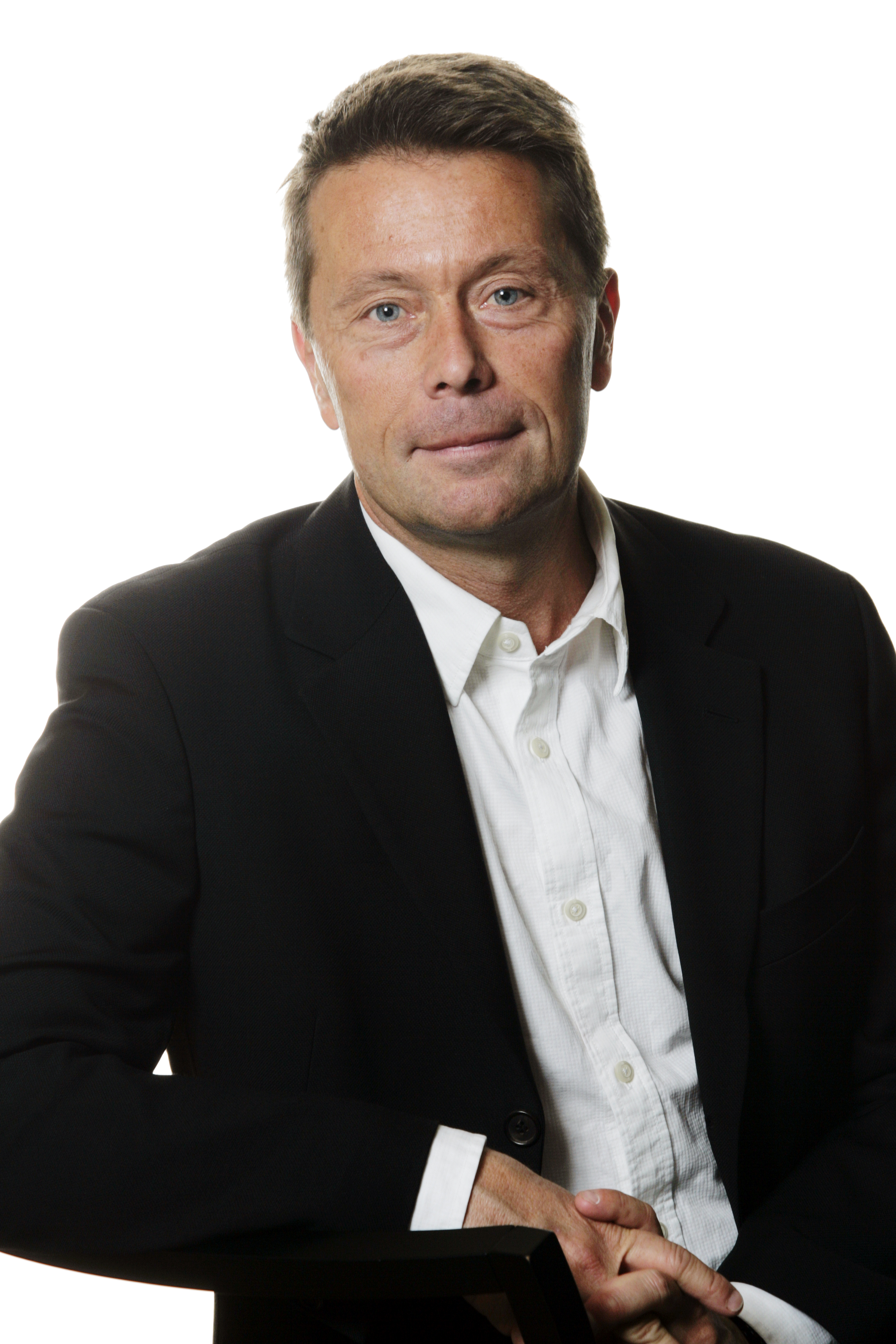
Tomas Brunegård

Tomas Brunegård (born 1962) is the Chairman of the Swedish Newspaper Publishers' Association and President of World Association of Newspapers and News Publishers (WAN-IFRA). He is also the former CEO of the Swedish media company the Stampen Group.

Brunegård has a Master of Science Business Administration from the School of Business, Economics and Law at the University of Gothenburg, and has previously been vice president of Burger King Sweden (1993–1996).

Member of the Governing Board, International School of Economics, Tbilisi (Georgia) 2010-2014.

Other assignments: Chairman of TU (Sweden) 2008-2013, Board member of Mentor Medier (Norway) 2011-, Board member of Utgivarna(Sweden) 2012-2013, Board member of Stena Line Holding (Holland) 2013-, Board member of FOJO (Sweden) 2014-, Board member of Svenska Mässan(Sweden) 2004-.

He is the author of two books. The first book, Mitt val, was released in 2019 and the second book, The Reason: A Personal Story, a Media Career, Jungles, and Thoughts on Why We Are Here, was released in 2023.
