= Whatcom County Library System =

Public library system in Washington

Coordinates: 48°49′48″N 122°32′21″W

Whatcom County within Washington

The Whatcom County Library System (WCLS) is a public library service for residents of Whatcom County, Washington. It has 10 library branches, a bookmobile, and other programs.

== History ==
The first libraries in Whatcom County were begun by women's clubs and organizations, and included facilities in Lynden, Ferndale, Blaine, and Sumas. The origination of a county-wide library system dates to the 1940s, when the County Grange proposed the idea of consolidating existing services and extending outreach to other communities. In 1944, voters in unincorporated Whatcom County passed a measure initiating a tax for library services and forming the Rural Library District.

In 1947 Sumas became the first city in Whatcom County to join WCLS. Bookmobile services began that same year and continue to be maintained as an outreach function of WCLS, along with services to senior communities and to correctional facilities. Over the next several decades, other communities voted to join the library system, and through fundraising efforts by the various "Friends of the Library" groups, were able to update and maintain their individual branch facilities.

== Whatcom County Library Foundation ==
In 2004, through a $25,000 grant received from the Pen Foundation for the PEN/Newman's Own First Amendment Award, WCLS instituted the Whatcom County Library Foundation. The Foundation is a nonprofit organization that assists in supporting the libraries of Whatcom County, and states that their focus is "to foster intellectual freedom and First Amendment rights and to encourage life-long learning." Among the endeavors supported by the Foundation are grants to WCLS libraries for special projects, support for building fundraising efforts, and the "Raise a Reader" program, which donates books to families of newborn infants at St Joseph's Hospital in Bellingham.

== Services ==
WCLS offers library services to multiple communities throughout Whatcom County. At the system's branches and Bookmobile, the library hosts a wide variety of events, including storytime, author appearances, youth and family events, game nights, literacy programs and community-building events. The Outreach Program offers delivery of items to care centers, assisted living facilities and correctional institutions, as well as homebound patrons. WCLS also maintains an active inter-library loan program for patrons.

In 2010, WCLS became part of the Ask-WA online service, offered in conjunction with the Washington State Library. This program provides residents of Washington state access to a reference librarian 24 hours a day, 7 days a week. Patrons can submit their questions via the internet and conduct a live chat with a librarian. WCLS also maintains an online presence through social networks such as Facebook and Twitter, as well as the WCLS online catalog.

== Collaboration ==
Although it is a separate library system, WCLS has maintained a reciprocal borrowing agreement with Bellingham Public Library since 1944. In 2010, WCLS became a member of "Whatcom Libraries Collaborate", a consortium of all academic and public libraries in Whatcom County. Through this program, any cardholder from any member library can borrow materials from and return materials to any other member library.

Whatcom County Library sponsors the "Whatcom READS! One Book Together" program in conjunction with the Whatcom County Library Foundation, Bellingham Public Library, Whatcom Community College Library, Western Washington University Library, Northwest Indian College, the Bellingham School District and their community partner, Village Books. Each year one book is selected as the central theme for the event, and a series of community discussion groups, author appearances, contests, and other activities are hosted throughout Whatcom County.

== WCLS Branch Locations ==
- Blaine Public Library
- Deming Library
- Everson McBeath Community Library
- Ferndale Public Library
- Island Library on Lummi Island
- Lynden Library
- North Fork Community Library in Kendall
- Point Roberts Library
- South Whatcom Library in Sudden Valley
- Sumas Public Library

== Bookmobile Stops ==
- Lake Samish
- Birch Bay
- South Lake Whatcom
- Wickersham
