= Bil Lepp =

American storyteller

Bil Lepp is an American storyteller and a five-time winner of the West Virginia State Liars' Contest. He performs at storytelling festivals around the nation and is a regular performer at the National Storytelling Festival in Jonesborough, Tennessee.

As of 2021, Lepp has released 25 collections of stories in the form of books and albums. He serves as host of Man vs. History, a series on History in which he explores the facts behind iconic events and personalities in American history.

== Awards and honors ==
- 2011 Storytelling World Award for Vampire Santa (album)
- 2014 PEN/Steven Kroll Award for The King of Little Things (picture-book)
- Irma Black Award Honor for The King of Little Things
