= Win Tin =

Burmese writer and political prisoner (12 March 1929 – 21 April 2014)

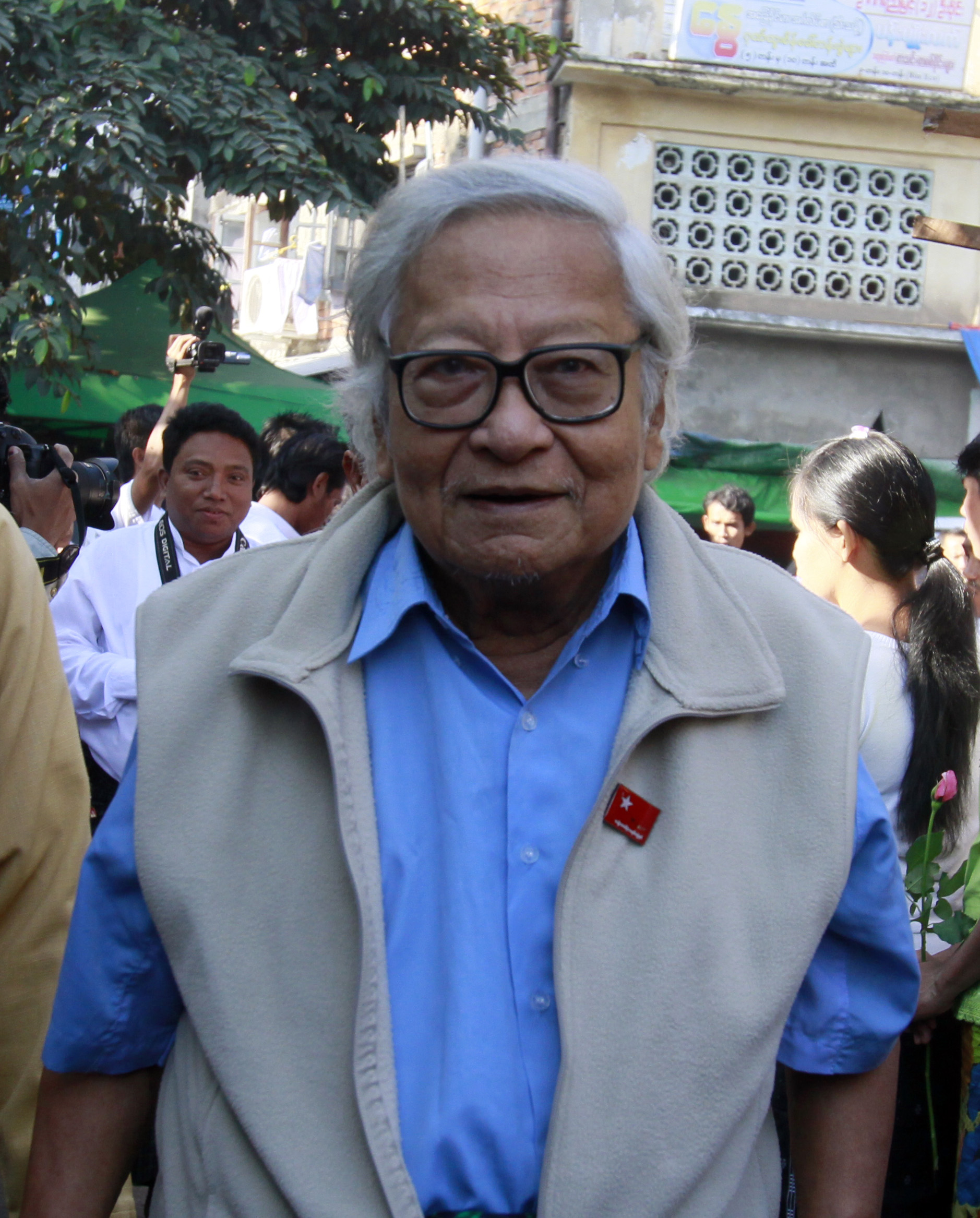
- Born: 12 March 1929; Gyobingauk Township, Pegu Division, British Burma
- Died: 21 April 2014 (aged 85); Yangon, Burma (Myanmar)
- Other names: Maung Wun Zin (မောင်ဝန်ဇင်း), Paw Thit (ပေါ်သစ်), Pyay Soe (ပြည်စိုး), Ponnya (ပုည), Win Swe (ဝင်းဆွေ), Thutethi (သုတေသီ), An Editor (အယ်ဒီတာ တစ်ဦး)
- Education: Rangoon University
- Occupations: Journalist and politician
- Political party: National League for Democracy
- Parent(s): U Pu; Daw Mar

Win Tin (Burmese: ဝင်းတင်, [wɪ́ɰ̃ tɪ̀ɰ̃], 12 March 1929 – 21 April 2014) was a Burmese journalist, politician and political prisoner. He co-founded the National League for Democracy (NLD). He was imprisoned by the military government for 19 years (1989–2008) for his writings and his leadership position in the NLD.

== Early life and education ==
He attended Myoma High School in Yangon. He received a Bachelor of Arts degree in English literature, modern history and political science from Rangoon University in 1953. Some of his contemporary school mates were Kyaw Aung and Mya Than Tint.

== Before 88 uprising ==
He served as the editor-in-chief of Kyemon (The Mirror), one of Burma’s most popular newspapers at that time after it was nationalized and original founder, U Thaung, was imprisoned in 1964. In 1969, he was appointed as editor-in-chief of a State owned new daily newspaper, the Hanthawaddy Daily in Mandalay by Ne Win’s military government. It became a successful one within a few years. But thanks to his unwillingness to compromise his editorial independence and his proclivity to run stories criticizing the regime, the paper was shut down and he was dismissed in 1978.

He wrote Search for beauty under the pen name Paw Thit. Translations of Northern Light and Queed were his well-known works. He also wrote books on his tours in communist countries. His autobiography, What is the Human Hell, was published in 2010 and described in detail of inhuman torturing and interrogation practices in prison.

== Political imprisonment ==
Win Tin served a 20-year sentence on charges including "anti-government propaganda." He had tried to inform the United Nations of ongoing human rights violations in Burmese prisons.

In 2001, Win Tin was awarded the UNESCO/Guillermo Cano World Press Freedom Prize for his efforts to defend and promote the right to freedom of expression. That year, he was also awarded the World Association of Newspapers' Golden Pen of Freedom Award. From 2006 onward, he could not receive visits from the International Committee of the Red Cross (ICRC).

At 81, he was in a poor state of health, exacerbated by his treatment in prison, which included torture, inadequate access to medical treatment, being held in a cell designed for military dogs, without bedding, and being deprived of food and water for long periods of time.

D Wave, NLD official periodical, was started in prison by his hand writing.

== Release ==
He was freed on 23 September 2008, after serving 19 years in prison.

After his release from prison, Win Tin made efforts to reorganise the NLD. He relaunched the weekly meetings of the party's Central Executive Committee which had been irregularly held since 2003. He also resumed a regular roundtable called "Youth and Future" which Aung San Suu Kyi had participated in the past. Win Tin visited families of political prisoners to offer moral support.

According to The Economist, he viewed Aung San Suu Kyi as being "too soft and much too pro-establishment," someone who "negotiated with the generals, where he never would, and was revered by party members in a way which he thought was bad for democracy."

He set up U Win Tin Foundation to help former political prisoners and their families including scholarships for university education in 2012. Most of the awarded money was used for that purpose.

== Health problems and death ==
He was admitted to a private hospital on 12 March 2014 for respiratory problems and hip pain before being moved to the Yangon General Hospital. He died of multiorgan failure on 21 April 2014. He wished to be cremated immediately after his death. His body was cremated at Yayway Cemetery in Yangon’s North Okkalapa Township in the evening of April 23.
