= Bellis Fair Mall =

Bellis Fair
- Coordinates: 48°47′09″N 122°29′26″W
- Address: 1 Bellis Fair Parkway; Bellingham, Washington; 98226
- Opened: August 1988; 38 years ago
- Developer: General Growth Properties
- Manager: 4th Dimension Properties
- Owner: 4th Dimension Properties
- Num. of anchor tenants: 6
- Floor area: 773,000 square feet (72,000 m^{2})
- Floors: 1 (staff mezzanine in Target)
- Website: bellisfair.com

Bellis Fair is an enclosed shopping mall in Bellingham, Washington, United States. Opened on August 4, 1988, it features JCPenney, Kohl's, Macy's, Macy's Home Store, Dick's Sporting Goods, H&M, Ashley Furniture, and Target. The mall is located along Interstate 5 at its interchange with State Route 539 (Guide Meridian Road) north of downtown Bellingham.

== History ==
Bellis Fair opened in August 1988, at the site of a former USDA Soil Conservation Service plant-materials center. Plans to build a regional shopping center north of Bellingham were announced in 1980 by the Trillium Corporation, who had acquired 1,200 acres (490 ha) for retail and office development. The mall attracted several retailers from downtown Bellingham, including Sears, Cineplex Odeon, JCPenney and The Bon Marché, who had failed to build a mall in downtown Bellingham in the early 1980s. Mervyn's and Target also anchored the mall initially, with the latter as part of the first wave of Target stores in the Pacific Northwest. The mall was popular with shoppers from nearby Vancouver, Canada, in the early 1990s, but sales waned as the Canadian dollar declined in value against the American dollar by 1995.

In 1990, a Nordstrom Place Two store was added, having also relocated from downtown Bellingham. The Nordstrom Place Two store was later converted to Nordstrom Rack in 1994, before closing in 1999 and becoming an auxiliary store for The Bon Marché. Also in 1999, Old Navy was added.

Bellis Fair Mall is the last place North Carolina student Leah Roberts was seen in March 2000 before she disappeared. She bought a ticket to watch the movie American Beauty at the mall and she ate at a café there. Her crashed car was later discovered nearby but no trace of her has ever been found.

Both Bon Marché stores became Bon-Macy's in 2003 and Macy's in 2005. After Mervyn's closed its stores in the Pacific Northwest in 2006, many of the locations were sold to Kohl's, including the Bellis Fair store. Sears closed in January 2013 and became Sports Authority the same year. The cinema closed in 2014, replaced with many restaurants.

Portions of the mall were renovated in 2015 including the common area, food court and entryways. Sports Authority closed in 2016 and was replaced with a Dick's Sporting Goods in 2017. Ashley Furniture opened in the remainder of the former Sears in 2018.

In February 2022, Brookfield Property Partners defaulted on its $77 million loan and the mall was put up for auction. Brookfield's original note on the property had been taken out a decade prior for $93 million when the mall was valued at $145 million.

In December 2022, 4th Dimension Properties acquired the mall at auction for $44 million. The developer stated an intent to improve the mall's nearly 80% occupancy rate by attracting nontraditional tenants.

A branch of the Bellingham Public Library opened in the mall on April 26, 2023.
