= Luis Gabriel Cano =

Luis Gabriel Cano Isaza (1924-2010) was the President and publisher of El Espectador who won the Golden Pen of Freedom Award in 1990 for his writings on the cocaine traffic. His brother Guillermo, who had also worked on the paper, had been assassinated by drug gangs. He had also won the Maria Moors Cabot prize in 1969.
