= Anton Betz =

German journalist and publisher (1893–1984)

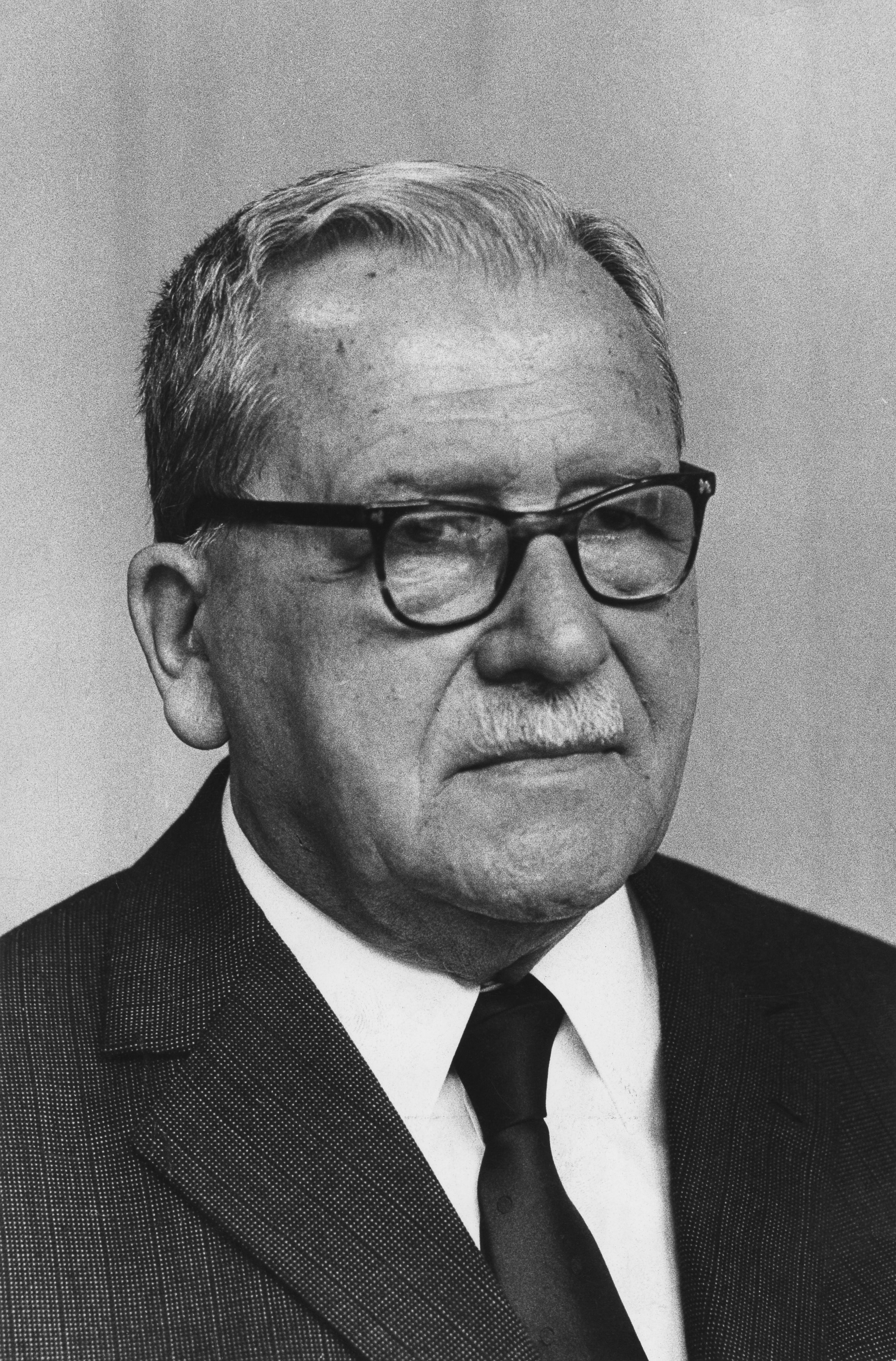

Anton Betz (23 February 1893 – 11 December 1984) was a German journalist and publisher.

== Biography ==
In 1911, Betz became pupil of Ignaz-Günther-Gymnasium in Rosenheim. In First World War Betz was soldier in France. After First World War he studied law in Freiburg and in Bonn. In 1921, he got his first job as journalist at German newspaper Saarbrücker Landeszeitung. On 29 March 1921, Betz married. 1923 Betz became editor-in-chief at German newspaper Saar-Zeitung in Saarlouis. 1925 Betz became CEO of German publisher and company Verlag und Druckerei G. J. Manz in Dillingen an der Donau and one year later CEO of German publisher and company Knorr & Hirth-Verlag in Munich. In 1933, Betzt lost his jobs as journalist and publisher.

After Second World War Betz was co-founder of German newspaper Rheinische Post. NSDAP-opponents Karl Arnold, Anton Betz, Erich Wenderoth and (soon resigned) Friedrich Vogel received a British newspaper license. The newspaper was established in 1946 and belongs to the Arnold, Betz, Droste, Alt and Ebel families. In 1947, Betz was CEO of Deutscher Pressedienst. In 1949, Betz became co-founder of Deutsche Presse-Agentur. In 1952, Betz was founding member of Katholische Nachrichten-Agentur. From 1963 to 1967 Betz was CEO of Bundesverband Deutscher Zeitungsverleger. Betz was founding member of political party CDU in Düsseldorf.

== Awards ==
- 1953: Order of Merit of the Federal Republic of Germany
- 1964: Bavarian Order of Merit
- 1973: World Association of Newspapers' Golden Pen of Freedom Award

== Literature ==
- Karl Bringmann, Max Nitzsche, Fritz Ramjoué: Festschrift für Anton Betz. Rheinisch-Bergische Druckerei- und Verlagsgesellschaft, Düsseldorf 1963.
- Anton Betz: Die Tragödie der „Münchner Neuesten Nachrichten“ 1932/33; in: Emil Dovifat: Karl Bringmann: Journalismus. Düsseldorf, 1961, Band 2, p. 34 ff
- Peter Henkel: Anton Betz: Ein Verleger zwischen Weimar und Bonn, düsseldorf university press, Düsseldorf 2011; ISBN 978-3-940671-48-6
