= Guardian Sein Win =

Burmese journalist and press freedom advocate

- ဂါဒီယန်စိန်ဝင်း
- Born: 12 February 1922; Kyaunggon, Burma
- Died: 17 October 2013 (aged 91); Yangon, Myanmar
- Occupation: Journalist
- Known for: The Guardian

Sein Win (Burmese: စိန်ဝင်း), commonly known as Guardian Sein Win (Burmese: ဂါဒီယန်စိန်ဝင်း), was a Burmese journalist and advocate of freedom of the press throughout his career.

== Early life and education ==
Sein Win was born in the Irrawaddy Delta town of Kyaunggon, British Burma (now Myanmar) on 12 February 1922, as the son of a minor civil servant.

He attended Judson College, a constituent college of Rangoon University. However, outbreak of World War II disrupted his education, and he briefly continued his education at Fukuoka, Japan, returning in 1945. While working as a reporter, he obtained dual undergraduate degrees, a Bachelor of Arts degree and a Bachelor of Laws degree.

== Career ==
Sein Win began his journalism career at the outset of the 1942 Japanese conquest of Burma. During World War II, Sein Win also served as a volunteer reporter and translator for the New Light of Burma newspaper, and also served as an apprentice reporter, editor, publisher and foreign correspondent.

In 1958, he became the chief editor and publisher of The Guardian, an English language Burmese newspaper, by which he would become known. In 1959, he wrote a seminal book, The Split Story: An Account of Recent Political Upheaval in Burma, which described the political chaos and disintegration of the Anti-Fascist People's Freedom League (AFPFL), the country's first post-independence ruling party. In 1962, Ne Win led a coup d'état and drove forward the Burmese Way to Socialism. In 1964, The Guardian, along with The Mirror and The Botataung, two other leading private newspapers, were nationalized and placed under the control of the Ministry of Information.

The following year, in 1963, Sein Win became a member of the International Press Institute’s board and won the Golden Pen of Freedom award from the International Federation of Newspaper Publishers. He joined the Associated Press in 1969, becoming one of the few sources of news from the isolated country and served until 1989. He spent his remaining years working for Japan's Kyodo News Service. Throughout his career, Sein Win served three stints in prison for his journalistic work, in 1958, and again in 1988 following the 8888 Uprising.

Sein Win died on 17 October 2013, after a period of declining health.

== Family ==
His wife, Khin Htwe, predeceased him in 2011. The couple had four children, including a daughter, Aye Aye Win, a journalist.
