= Yang Tongyan =

Chinese novelist (1961–2017)

- Chinese: 杨同彦
- Born: April 12, 1961
- Died: November 7, 2017 (aged 56) at Hospital in Shanghai, China
- Education: Beijing Normal University (1982, B.A.)
- Writing career
- Pen name: Yang Tianshui Chinese: 杨天水
- Period: 1990-2017
- Genres: Essay, short story, poetry

Yang Tongyan (Chinese: 杨同彦; was writing under the pen name Yang Tianshui (Chinese: 杨天水); April 12, 1961 — November 7, 2017), was a Chinese novelist, essayist, and poet best known as dissident for his criticism of the Chinese government.

== Biography ==
Yang Tongyan graduated from Beijing Normal University with B.A. in History (1982). He worked as teacher, in the civil service, and as a freelance writer. His works were published on the internet. He was accused by the Chinese government of counterrevolutionary actions after the Tiananmen Square protests of 1989 and was imprisoned from 1990 to 2000. Yang wrote many of his works in prison. He was a member of the Independent Chinese PEN Center.

He was arrested and then held in a detention centre since December 2005. In May 2006, Tongyan was sentenced to 12 years in prison for publishing criticism of the Chinese government, and sent to prison in Nanjing. He had tuberculosis, peritonitis and was treated in hospital in 2010, but his application for medical parole was denied then. Tongyan was released on medical parole for treatment of an aggressive form of brain cancer in a hospital in Shanghai in August 2017. He underwent brain surgery there on August 23. His colleagues were unable to connect with him while he was receiving treatment in the hospital. He was denied to travel abroad for treatment. Yang died in the hospital in Shanghai on November 7, 2017. Chinese authorities pressured Yang's relatives to cremate his body and bury his ashes in the sea while keeping this information about the burial in sea in secret, but a friend of Yang had learned about it and leaked it to a human rights group. Amnesty International considered Yang Tongyan as a prisoner of conscience who was persecuted by the Chinese government for his fight for human rights.

== Works ==
- China permeated with fear - is a short essay about Chinese society that has tendency to jump in panic when some calamity happened instead to solve source of accident. This tendency can be seen also when Chinese officials are ready to give bribes to their bosses in order to secure their post, being suppressed by panic and fears of losing their job.

== Awards ==
- He was awarded with the PEN/Barbara Goldsmith Freedom to Write Award in 2008. Larry Siems, director of the award, said that the jury chose Yang Tongyan for being one of 39 Chinese writers and journalists who were currently in prison. Also Yang was a member of the Independent Chinese PEN Center, said Larry Siems, that was organised by Chinese colleagues, and there are five members of that PEN Center currently imprisoned.
