= World Association of Newspapers and News Publishers =

Organization of newspaper associations

World Association of Newspapers
- Abbreviation: WAN-IFRA
- Formation: June 1948; 78 years ago
- Type: INGO
- Headquarters: Frankfurt, Germany
- Region served: Worldwide
- Official language: English, French, German
- Website: wan-ifra.org

The World Association of Newspapers and News Publishers (WAN-IFRA) is a non-profit, non-governmental organization made up of 76 national newspaper associations, 12 news agencies, 10 regional press organisations, and many individual newspaper executives in 100 countries. The association was founded in 1948, and, as of 2011, represented more than 18,000 publications globally.

WAN's objectives are to defend and to promote freedom of the press, to support the development of newspaper publishing, and to foster global co-operation. It has provided consultation for UNESCO, the United Nations, and the Council of Europe.

According to WAN, from 2007 to 2011, global newspaper advertising dropped 41% to $76 billion.

== History ==
The earliest organization that has since become WAN-IFRA was the FIEJ (Federation Internationale des Editeurs de Journaux et Publications, English: International Federation of Newspaper Publishers), the international federation of newspaper editors founded in 1948 by survivors of the clandestine press of France and the Netherlands to fight for survival of a free press worldwide.

IFRA's origins emerged from INCA (International Newspaper Colour Association), founded in 1961 when European publishers began to introduce the use of colour in newspapers; it was the world's leading association for newspaper and media publishing. In 1970, it became IFRA (the INCA FIEJ Research Association) to treat the rapidly developing technical side of the publishing industry.

In 2007, the organization founded MINDS, Media Information Network (originally Mobile Information and News Data Services for 3G), a nonprofit organization that hosts an annual conference for news organizations and agencies.

In July 2009, the World Association of Newspapers (WAN) merged with IFRA, the research and service organisation for the news publishing industry, to become the World Association of Newspapers and News Publishers (WAN-IFRA). The two organisations had been discussing a merger, on and off, for more than five years, and had built up several similar products and services and had an increasing overlap in membership.

In June 2024, DistriPress, a global trade association founded in 1955 to promote circulation and distribution of newspapers and magazines, was formerly merged into WAN-IFRA. In December 2025, FIPP announced it will merge into WAN-IFRA.

== Identity and mission ==
WAN-IFRA is a trade association with a human rights mandate. Its first objective is the defence and promotion of press freedom and the economic independence of newspapers. It is also an industry think tank for new strategies, business models, and operational improvements.

== Headquarters ==
WAN-IFRA carries out its work from headquarters in Frankfurt, Germany, and in Paris, France, with subsidiaries in Singapore, India, and Mexico.

== World Editors Forum ==
The World Editors Forum (WEF) is the organisation for editors within the World Association of Newspapers and News Publishers.

== Golden Pen of Freedom Award ==
WAN administers the annual Golden Pen of Freedom Award to recognize a journalist or media organisation that has made an outstanding contribution to the defence and promotion of freedom of the press.

== Monitoring journalists killed ==
Since 1998, WAN has maintained annual tallies of media employees killed around the world. The worst year on record is 2006, when 110 media employees died in the line of duty.

== See also ==
- Tomas Brunegård, Former President of World Association of Newspapers and News Publishers (WAN-IFRA)
