= 2026 Iranian diaspora protests =

Protests outside of Iran against the Iranian government

- Part of the reactions to the 2025–2026 Iranian protests, and the reactions to the 2026 Iran war
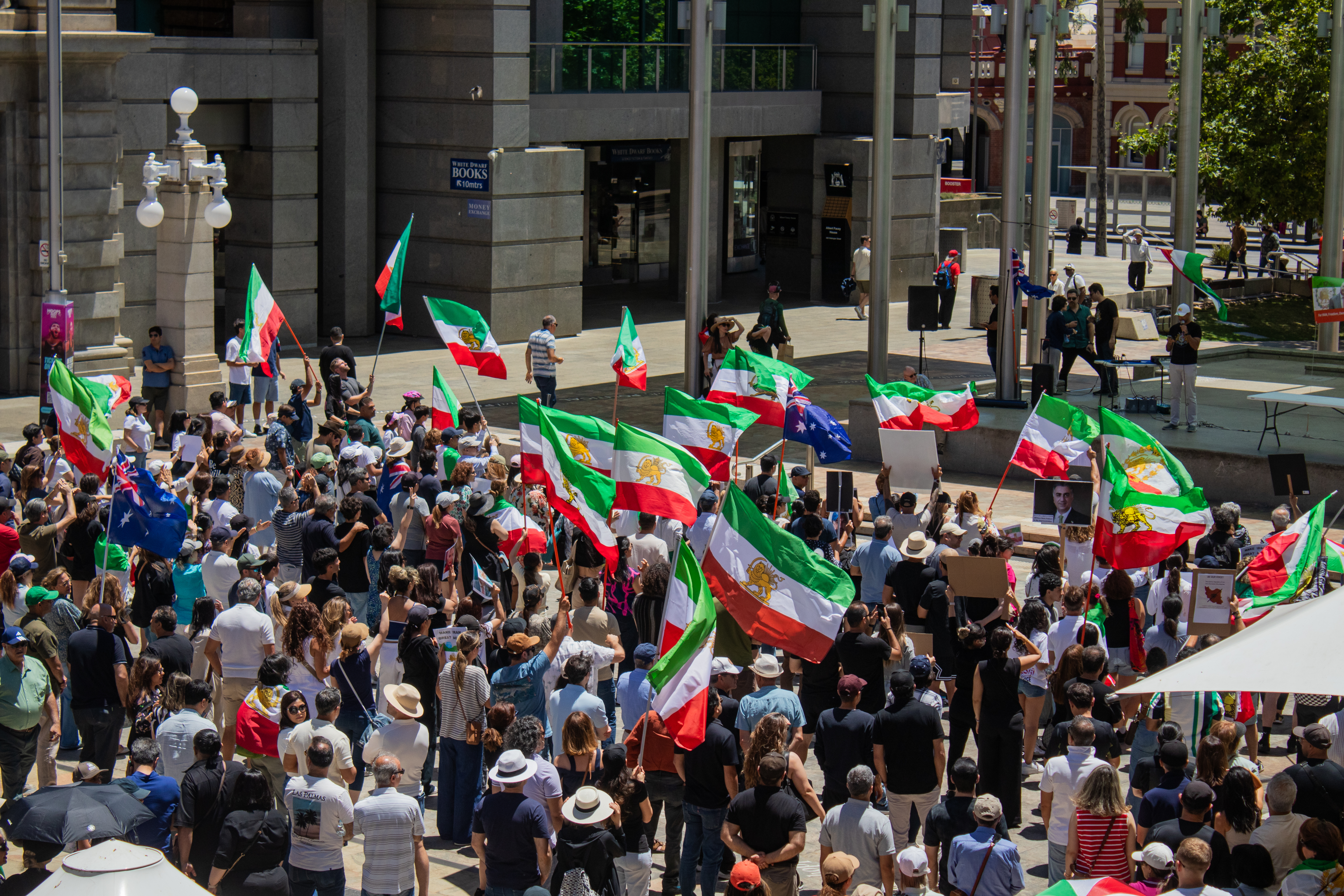
- Members of the Iranian diaspora in Perth, Australia, holding a solidarity rally on 10 January 2026 against the Islamic Republic
- Date: 28 December 2025 - present
- Location: International across at least 30 countries and 73 cities

During the 2025–2026 Iranian protests and the ensuing internet blackout and massacres in Iran, many people across the Iranian diaspora held solidarity rallies worldwide against the Islamic Republic. Some protesters and diaspora members have faced transnational threats, violence, and even death amid the rallies. The diaspora-led rallies against the Islamic Republic have continued during the 2026 Iran war.

After the start of the Iran war on 28 February, celebratory rallies against the Islamic Republic were held worldwide, led by the Iranian diaspora. This mirrored reactions reported among some Iranians in Iran.

Several thousand protesters gathered in Berlin in February 2026, with about 10,000 attending a rally at the Brandenburg Gate organized by the MEK, calling for an end to Iran's clerical regime and condemning its violent crackdown on recent anti-government protests. The MEK event featured prominent European and American political figures, with participants demanding free elections.

Reza Pahlavi called for a global day of action on 14 February, prompting large diaspora rallies in cities including Los Angeles, Toronto, and Munich. The Munich rally attracted more than 250,000 participants, while the Toronto and Los Angeles rallies each drew an estimated 350,000 attendees. Analysts noted that Pahlavi's level of support remains difficult to assess, with some questioning whether participants were expressing support for monarchy or opposition to the Islamic Republic.

== Diaspora protests and rallies ==
=== Initial rallies ===
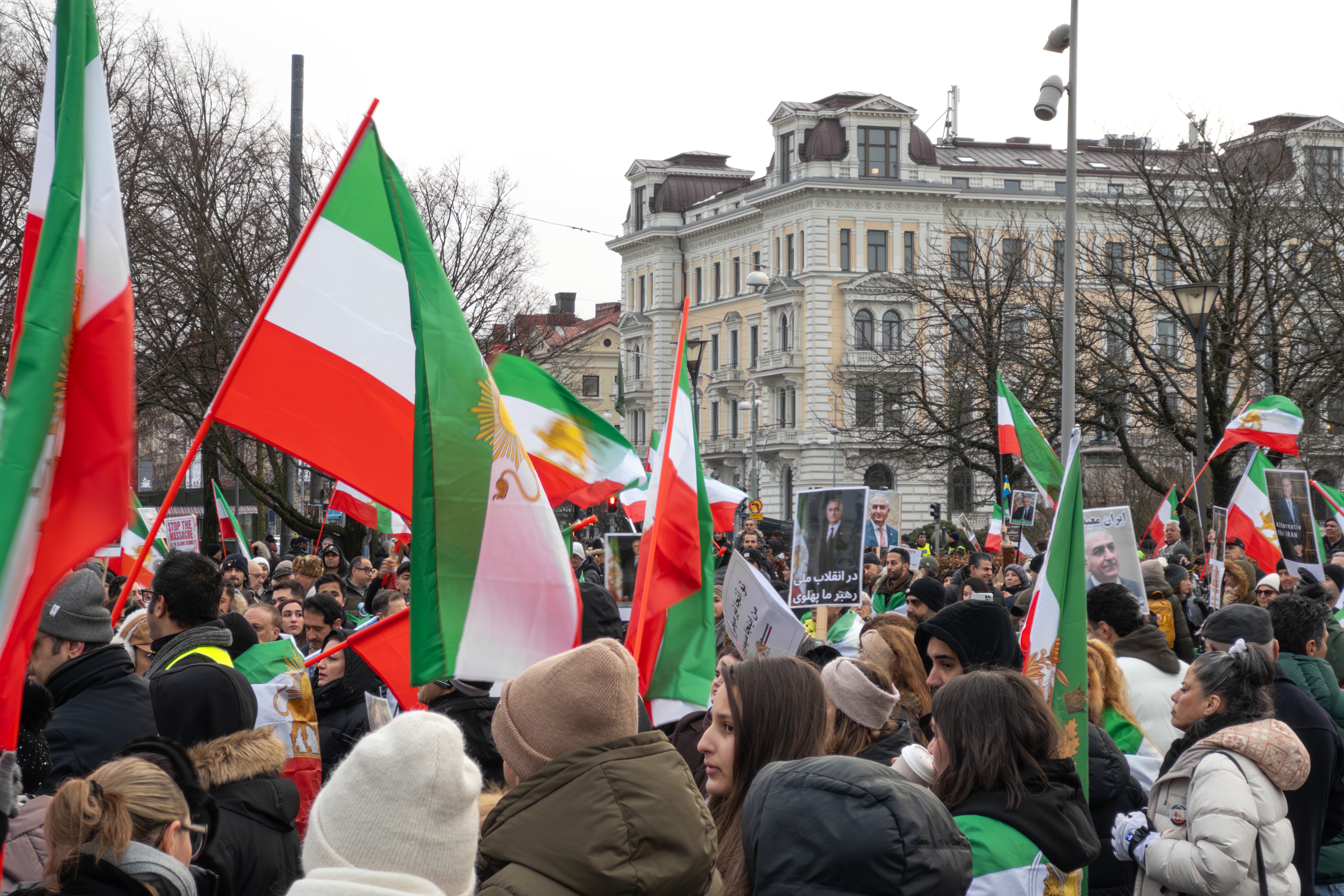
Protest in Gothenburg, Sweden, on 17 January 2026 against the Islamic Republic

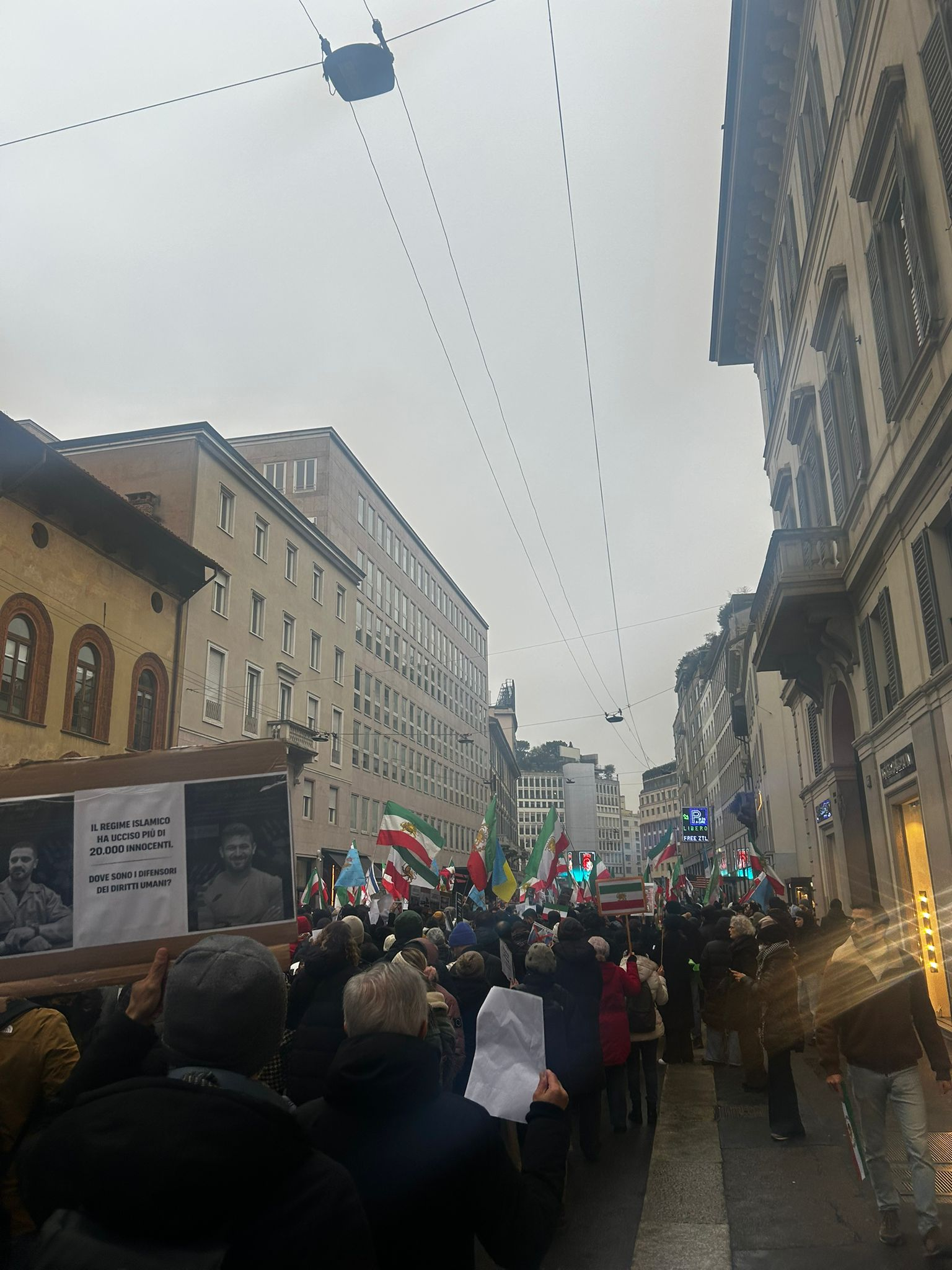
Iranian diaspora protest in Milan, Italy, on 24 January 2026 against the Islamic Republic

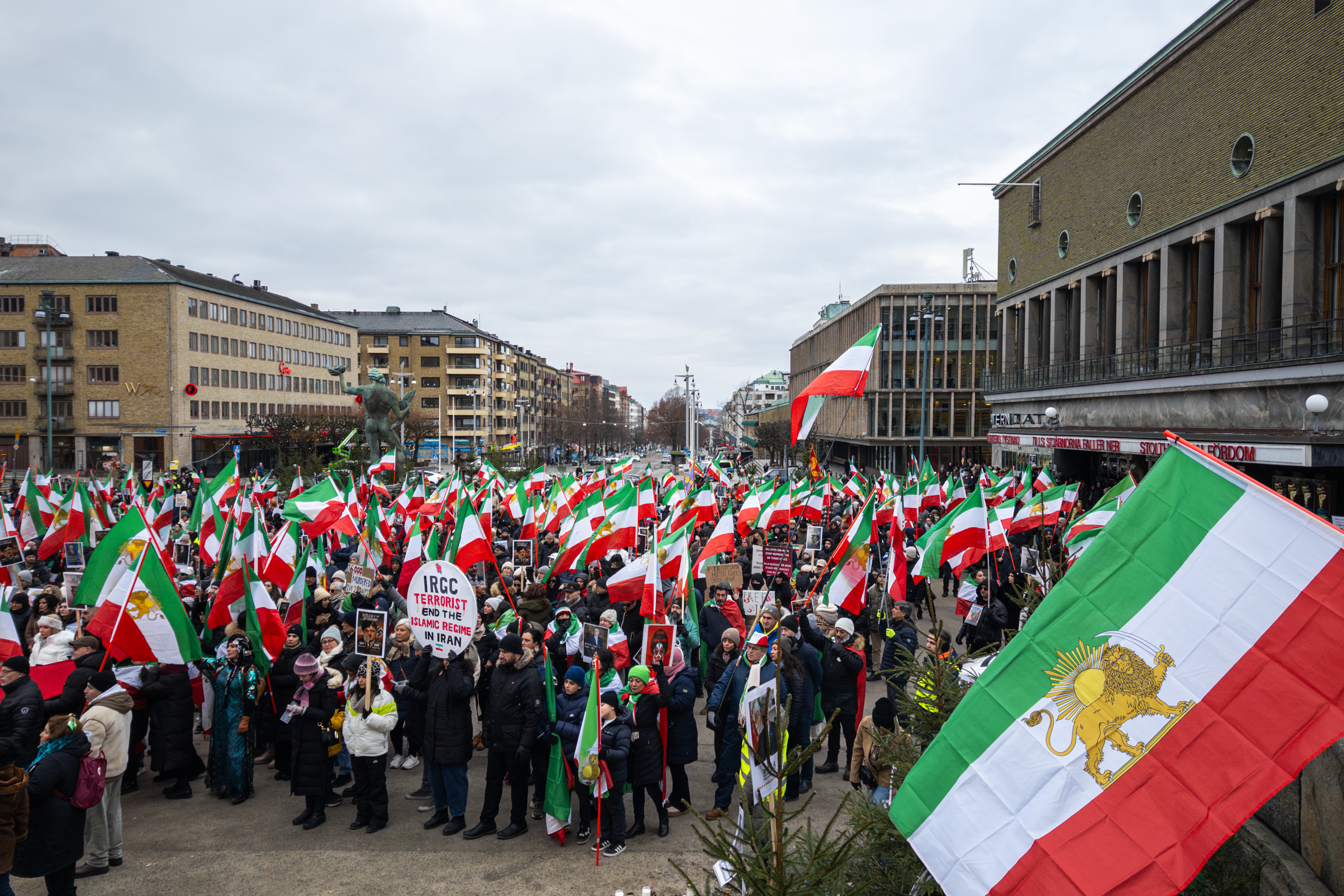
Protest in Gothenburg, Sweden, on 25 January 2026 against the Islamic Republic

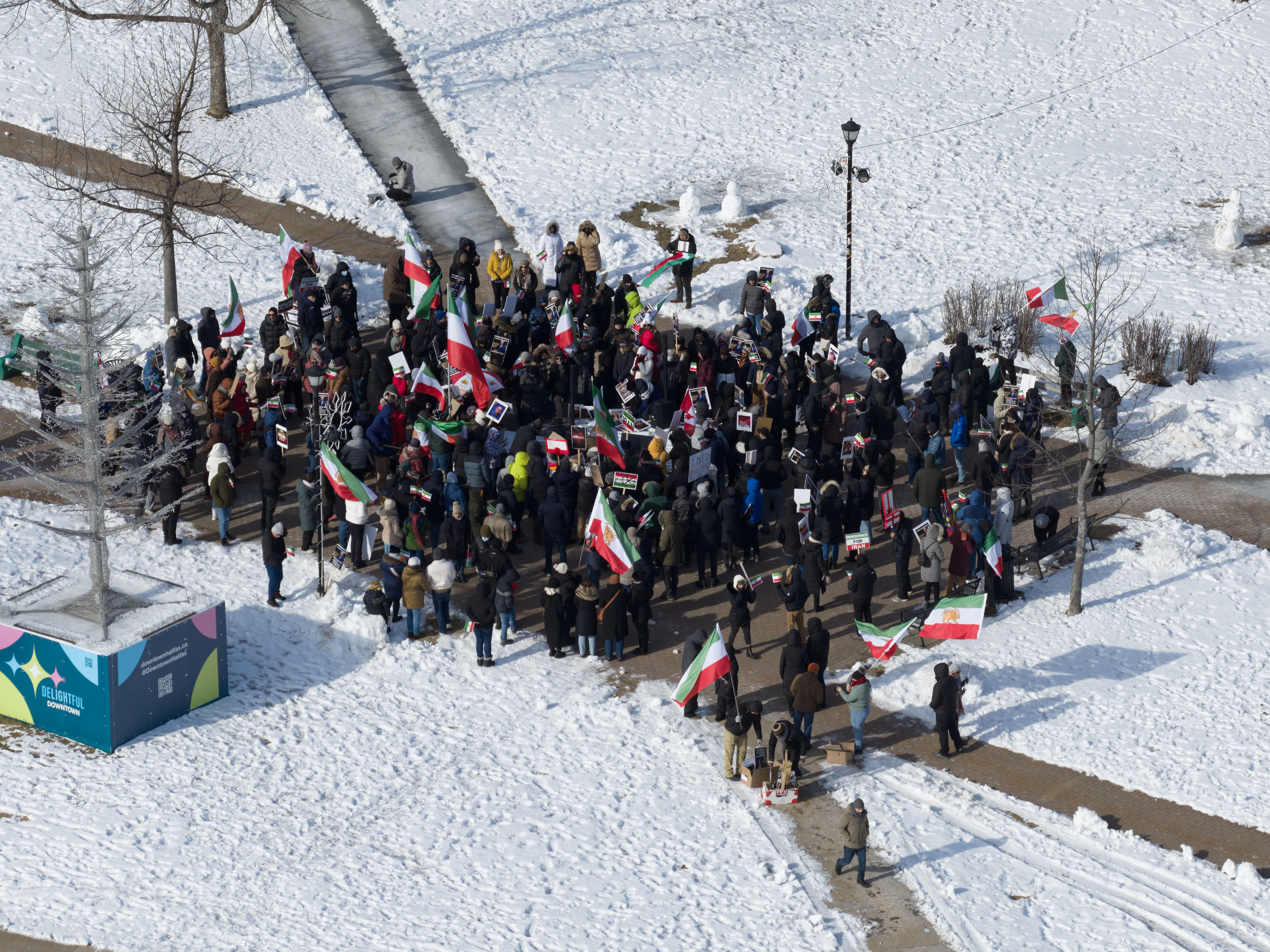
Protest in Halifax, Canada, on 25 January 2026 against the Islamic Republic

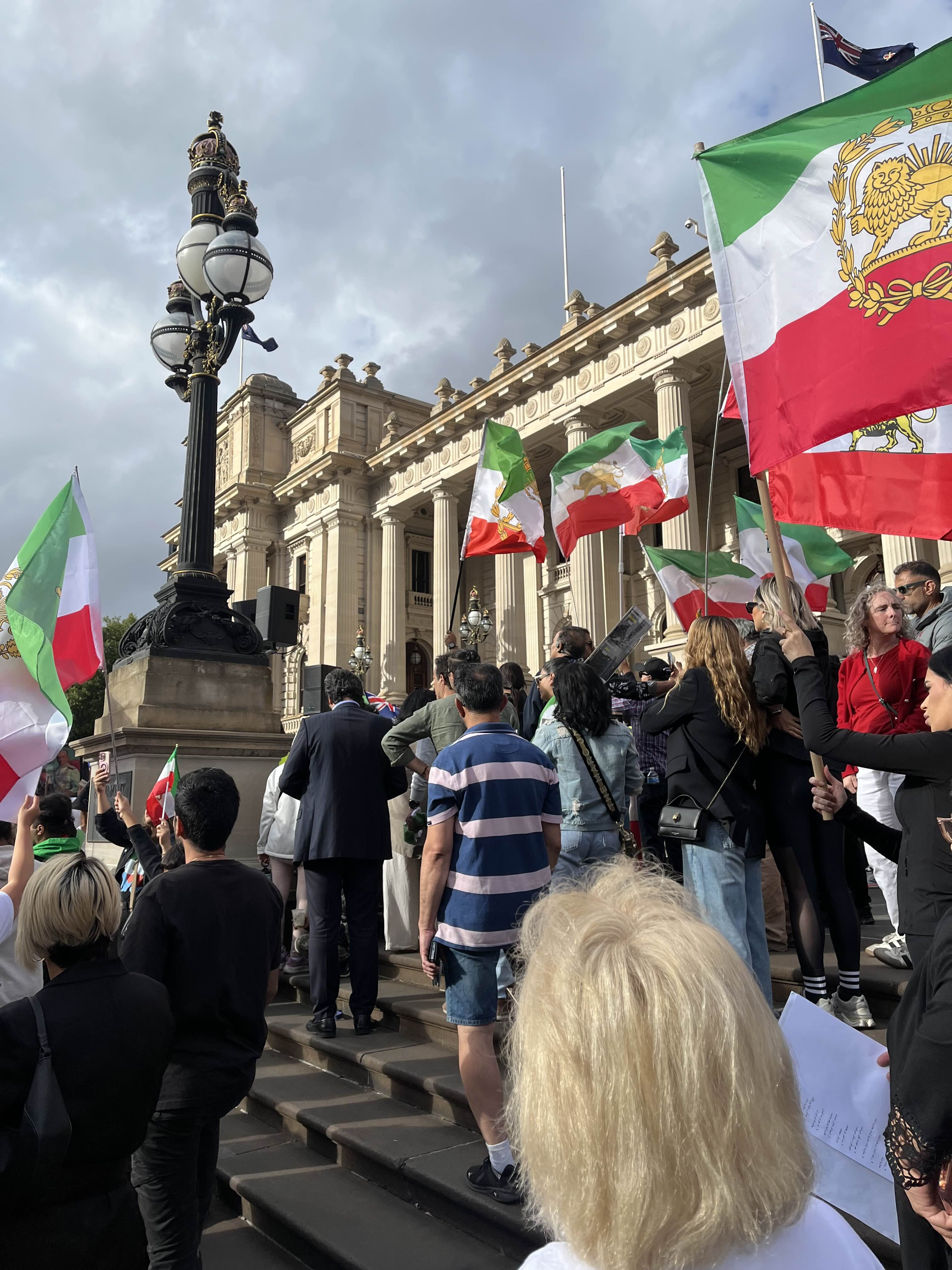
A pro-Pahlavi demonstration in Melbourne, Australia, on 1 February 2026

People with the Ukrainian and Iranian Lion and Sun flag protesting against the Islamic Republic and Russian invasion of Ukraine on 24 February 2026 in Europe

Beginning in January 2026, solidarity rallies against the Islamic Republic were held worldwide in many countries. (Note: including in Canada, the United States, the United Kingdom, Norway, Sweden, Finland, Germany, the Netherlands, Belgium, France, Switzerland, Portugal, Spain, Austria, Hungary, Italy, Poland, Slovenia, Bulgaria, Greece, Cyprus, Romania, Ukraine, Turkey, Ghana, Israel, Georgia, Armenia, India, South Korea, Japan, Australia, New Zealand, and Chile.)

By 20 January, the country with the most rallies was Germany with 27 rallies in the ten days between 11 and 20 January. The US and Australia held 23 rallies each during this period, Canada held 19, and the UK held 12. While the number of protesters across many of the rallies is unclear, by 1 February, a rally in Toronto was reported to have 150,000 in attendance with "zero incidents" according to Toronto police, and a rally in Los Angeles was reported to have 60,000 in attendance.

While the protests in Iran were suppressed with deadly force, the worldwide solidarity rallies across the diaspora continued. Despite isolated incidents of violence reported in some locations, most diaspora rallies were largely peaceful overall, with police in several cities reporting orderly conduct and many participants giving flowers to officers as a gesture of gratitude, as well as cleaning up litter in the streets at the end of the rallies.

=== Global day of action ===
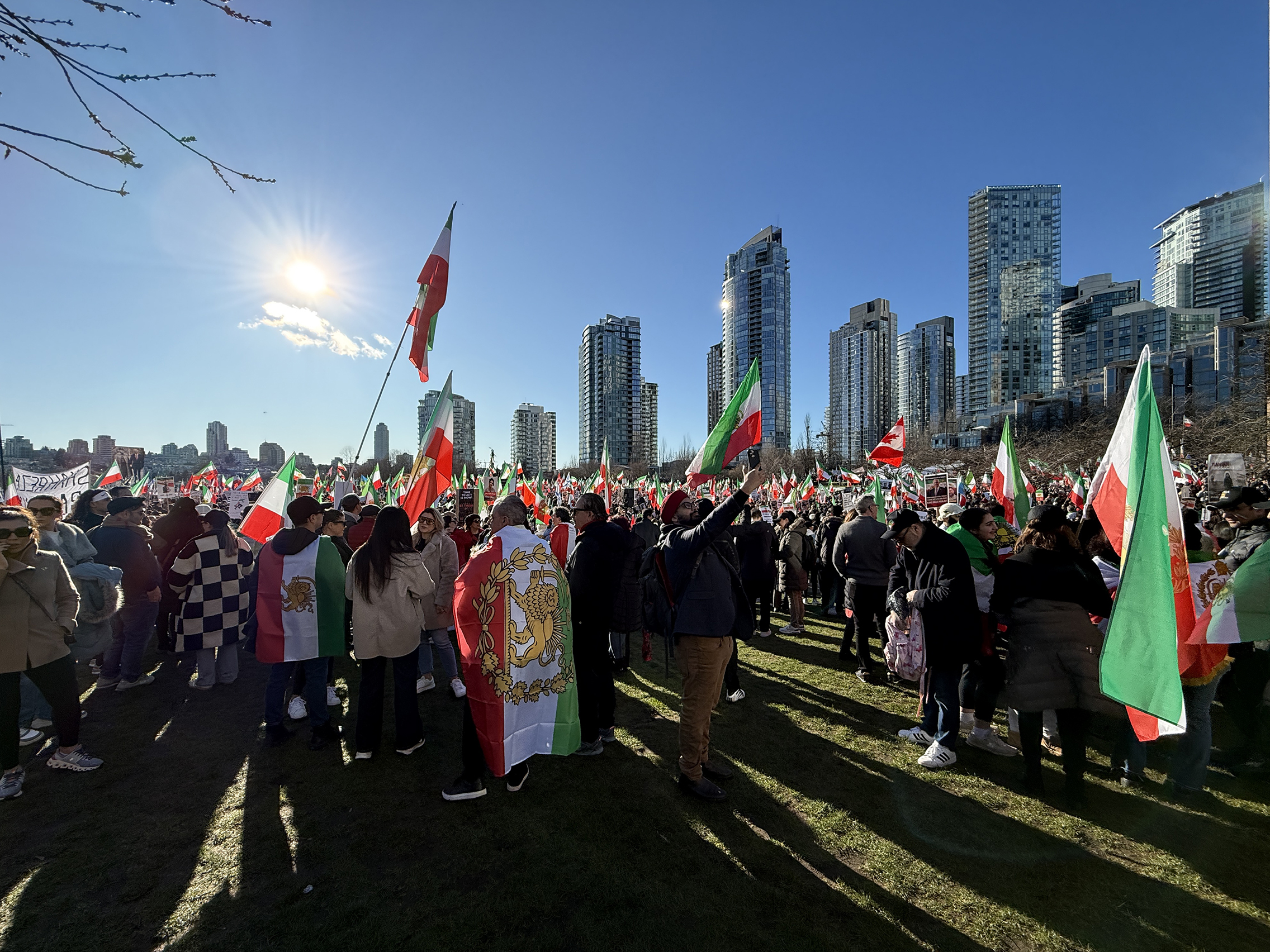
Global day of action for the Iranian people in David Lam Park, Vancouver on 14 February

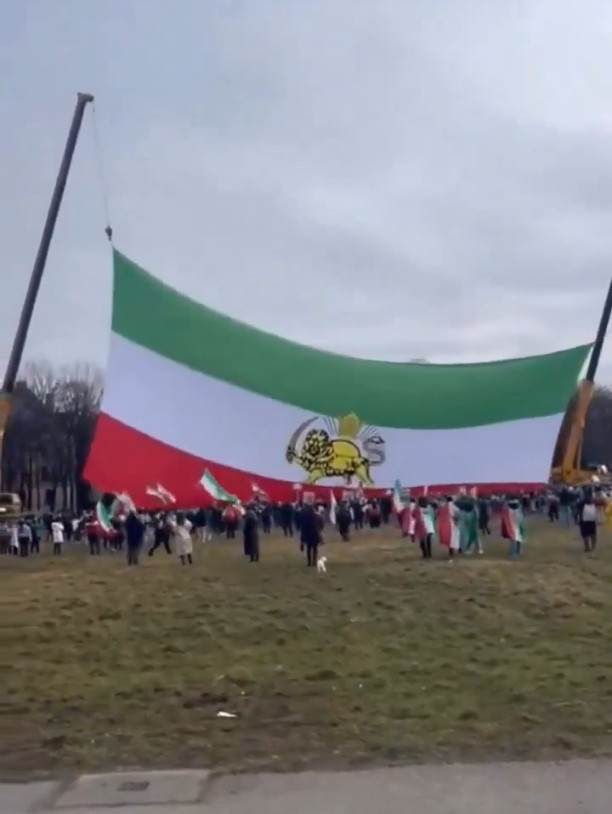
Massive 50-metre flag being raised in Munich on 14 February

Reza Pahlavi declared 14 February as a "global day of action," and called for major diaspora solidarity rallies in Los Angeles, Toronto, and Munich. Iranians from neighboring countries, states, and cities drove, bused, and flew in for the Munich, Toronto, and Los Angeles rallies. According to some reports, 250,000 attended the 14 February rally in Munich, which would make it the largest ever Iran-focused demonstration in European history to date, while the Toronto and Los Angeles rallies each drew 350,000 in attendance. The 14 February rally in London also drew 50,000, and the rally in Vancouver drew 45,000. Thousands of people took part in solidarity rallies elsewhere worldwide, including in Washington, D.C., Lisbon, Tel Aviv, and cities across Australia. In total, the number of protesters across all cities may have exceeded one million.

The same day, the 62nd Munich Security Conference was held, where Reza Pahlavi was invited to participate and speak before giving a speech at the Munich rally. U.S. Senator Lindsey Graham also attended the Munich rally, holding a Lion and Sun flag and telling the crowd, "The people of Iran are making history, and this is the most magnificent moment in Iranian history," while stressing that he would help the Iranian people rid themselves of the Islamic Republic.

Iranian state media downplayed the diaspora rallies, while many Iranians within Iran stated the diaspora rallies gave them a renewed sense of hope and unity. Following the Munich rally, Iran summoned Germany's ambassador in Tehran.

=== Following the Israeli–United States strikes on Iran ===
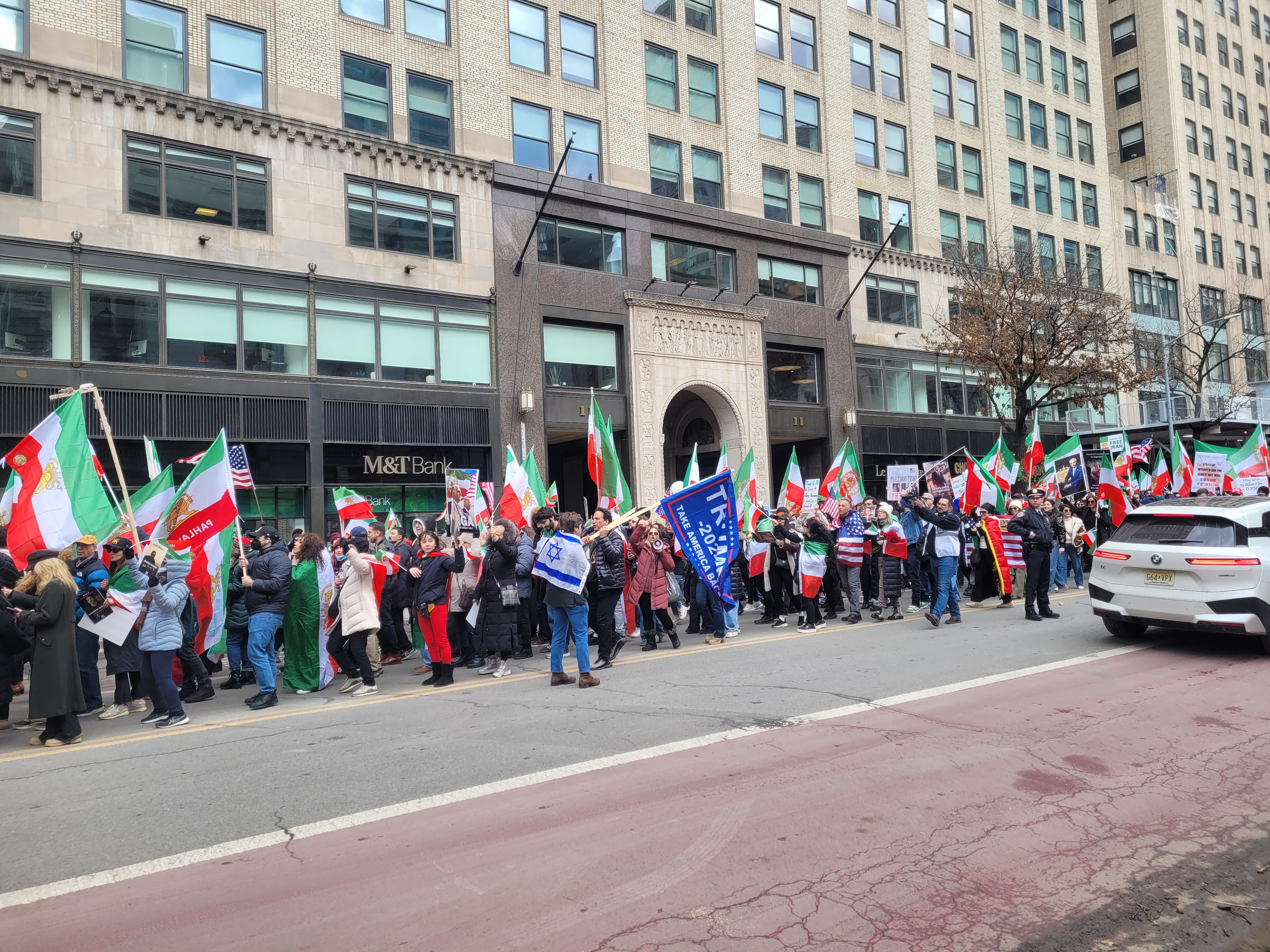
Iranian diaspora in the US celebrated the death of Khamenei in New York City on 1 March 2026

Following the start of the Iran war, many members of the Iranian diaspora held celebratory rallies worldwide amid the American and Israeli strikes on Iran and the assassination of Khamenei, echoing the cheerful sentiment of many in Iran.

Amid the war, members of the Iranian diaspora also celebrated the 17 March Chaharshanbe Suri festivities worldwide ahead of the 20 March Nowruz holiday. The diaspora rallies against the Islamic Republic also continued during the Nowruz festivities. Diaspora-led rallies supporting the overthrow of the Islamic Republic have continued amid the war.

On 29 March, a rally and march from US Congress towards the White House was held in Washington DC in support of regime change in Iran; the rally was called for by Pahlavi. After the 8 April ceasefire, rallies continued to be held worldwide against the Islamic Republic, with protesters voicing opposition to any potential deal with the Islamic Republic during international rallies on 11 April and onwards, including in Australia, Austria, Canada, Finland, France, Germany, Japan, New Zealand, Scotland, South Korea, Spain, Sweden, Switzerland, and the United States. Separately, on 30 April 2026, diaspora protests were held outside the 2026 FIFA Congress in Vancouver, calling on FIFA to ban the Iranian team from the 2026 FIFA World Cup and stating that it represents the Islamic Revolutionary Guard Corps (IRGC) instead of the people of Iran; over 200 Iranians also protested outside SoFi Stadium in Los Angeles on 7 June before Iran's opening 2026 World Cup match, waving Lion and Sun flags after FIFA banned the flag again.

Maryam Rajavi, the leader of the France–Albania based National Council of Resistance of Iran, which is the political wing of the People's Mojahedin Organization of Iran (MEK), announced the formation of a rival transitional government and rejected both the Islamic Republic and the Iran Prosperity Project on the social media site X.

In contrast to the diaspora celebrations supporting the Israeli–US military strikes, protests against the strikes were held worldwide, with protests in the United States against the strikes being organized by a coalition of organizations, including 50501, A.N.S.W.E.R., American Muslims for Palestine, Black Alliance for Peace, Code Pink, Democratic Socialists of America, Palestinian Youth Movement, and the National Iranian American Council, and protests in London, England against the strikes being organized by groups that include the Campaign for Nuclear Disarmament, Stop The War, the Palestine Solidarity Campaign, the Muslim Association of Britain, the Palestinian Forum in Britain, and Friends of Al-Aqsa. The Guardian viewed the coalition in the US protests as consisting of left-wing organizations. London's Metropolitan Police imposed conditions on both the Iranian diaspora rallies and the pro-Palestinian "Hands off Iran" protests in order to prevent potential clashes between the opposing groups.

Philip Mai, a senior researcher at the Social Media Lab at Toronto Metropolitan University, said that coordinated online activity appeared to be promoting Pahlavi as the leading figure of the Iranian opposition during the protests.

In June 2026, the Paris Police Prefecture banned an NCRI-organized demonstration against executions in Iran, citing possible clashes between opposing groups. The NCRI challenged the decision in court, describing the stated reasons as unfounded. The organizers suggested the decision was influenced by a telephone conversation between the French and Iranian foreign ministers shortly before the ban. Organizers expected around 100,000 participants, and the rally was intended to protest the recent increase in executions in Iran.

== Protester demands ==
=== Regime change in Iran ===
Protesters called for the international community to take "immediate action" against the Iranian government's actions in suppressing protesters during the 2026 Iran massacres, while expressing support for the Iranian people.

A study has indicated that members of the Iranian diaspora were deeply affected by the massacres despite being far away physically and that it had a major effect on their lives as a whole.

At many of the rallies, protesters replaced the flag of the Islamic Republic with the Lion and Sun flag, the Iranian flag prior to the 1979 Iranian Revolution, and accompanied it with the flag of the host country. Slogans included "Free political prisoners", "Long live the king", "Death to Khamenei", "king Reza Pahlavi" and "This is the final battle—Pahlavi will return", while some demonstrators who reject both forms of government have been heard shouting "Neither Shah nor Mullah". Protesters' signs condemned the "New Holocaust," a "genocide in the making," and "terror". Protesters also called for regime change and secular democracy.

Another concern cited by protesters is the internet blackout, which they say is a method used by the government to prevent protesters from within the country from effectively communicating, while covering up a deadly repression of protesters. During the internet blackout in Iran, Iranian diaspora internet users ran applications to share part of their bandwidth in an attempt to help users inside Iran circumvent the blackout.

Across the Iranian diaspora as well as Iranians inside Iran, calls grew for American military strikes on Iran. Likewise, amid the 26 February negotiations in Geneva, members of the Iranian diaspora protested against the Islamic Republic outside the United Nations Office. During the 28 February Israeli–United States strikes on Iran, members of the Iranian diaspora held celebratory rallies worldwide, echoing the cheerful sentiment of many in Iran.

On 24 February, Iranian protesters in London urged the UK to designate the IRGC as a terrorist organization.

=== Deportation of Islamic Republic agents abroad ===
Iranian Americans called for the deportation of senior Iranian officials' relatives, some of whom live in the United States. In Atlanta, Georgia, a group protested the employment of Fatemeh Ardeshir-Larijani, daughter of Ali Larijani, outside her place of employment at the Winship Cancer Institute. Ali Larijani has been described as the mastermind of the massacres, according to former Iranian government officials. Fatemeh Ardeshir-Larijani was fired from her position following the protests. Buddy Carter, a Republican congressman for the state of Georgia, demanded that Ardeshir-Larijani's medical license to treat patients in the United States be revoked, calling it a threat to national security. Similarly, on 30 January, protesters in San Jose, California urged for the dismissal of another Iranian official's son, Ehsan Nouhi Bezanjani, the son of Kobra Khazali, from his job at Intuitive Institute. The United States Department of State stated that Secretary of State Marco Rubio was taking action to revoke the privilege of Iranian senior officials and their family members from residing in the United States. On 18 February, the US State Department announced that Rubio was "taking steps to impose visa restrictions against 18 Iranian regime officials and telecommunications industry leaders, as well as their immediate family members." On 20 February, Mora Namdar, the Assistant Secretary of State for Consular Affairs of the US State Department, stated "the United States will continue to pursue visa restrictions for individuals who violently repress and censor Iranians seeking to exercise their freedom of expression." On 4 April, the United States revoked the visas of four Iranians and arrested the niece and grand-niece of former IRGC commander Qasem Soleimani in preparation for their deportation. Soleimani's daughter denied any family connection with the people arrested. On 10 June 2026, the United States Department of State probed National Iranian American Council founder Trita Parsi for possible deportation.

On 4 February 2026, it was reported that human rights advocates in Canada urged the RCMP to investigate the IRGC officials living in Canada who are linked to the repression of protesters and crimes against humanity. The Canadian Senate held a hearing on 10 February and discussed Islamic Republic agents and affiliates living freely in Canada. On 16 March, Canadian politician Melissa Lantsman warned that at least 700 agents of the IRGC reside in Canada. German energy company EnBW investigated a senior executive over allegations of possible ties to Iran's government. The Guardian reported that two UK-based brothers were behind a messaging app that was sharing data with Iranian authorities. On 19 March, the UK arrested two suspected Iranian spies near a nuclear submarine base in Scotland.

On 18 February, it was reported that Australia had granted permanent residency and health qualifications to Hanieh Safavi, the daughter of Iranian major general Yahya Rahim Safavi, a sanctioned adviser to Supreme Leader Ali Khamenei and a former senior figure in the IRGC who was reportedly involved in Iran's nuclear and ballistic missile programs, drawing criticism from members of the Iranian diaspora and opposition lawmakers. A parliamentary petition was subsequently lodged by Iranian Australians, demanding the Australian government "deny all visas, including refugee visas, to IR (Islamic Republic) officials, IRGC members, and their immediate family," while a separate change.org petition was launched calling for Safavi's deportation.

== Violence towards diaspora protesters ==
As the Iranian diaspora held solidarity rallies worldwide, some reports of violence and threats towards them emerged. Deutsche Welle reported that Iranian exiles were being targeted internationally by the Iranian government's secret services.

During protests in the United Kingdom, some British-Iranian activists and community groups reported harassment, threats, and intimidation by pro-monarchist activists. A petition called on the UK government to investigate supporter groups of Reza Pahlavi and protect Iranian, Iraqi, Kurdish, and other communities from intimidation and threats of violence.

On 11 January 2026, a U-Haul truck was used to ram into a crowd of protesters opposed to the Iranian government during solidarity rally in support of the Iranian protesters in Westwood, Los Angeles, California. The vehicle plowed into a crowd estimated at more than 3,000 people. No serious injuries were reported. The truck displayed a sign saying: "No Shah. No Regime. USA: Don't Repeat 1953. No Mullah." The sign appeared to reference the 1953 U.S.-backed coup that ousted Prime Minister Mohammad Mosaddegh, strengthened the shah's rule, and helped pave the way for Iran's 1979 Islamic Revolution. According to the Associated Press, some people within the Iranian diaspora in the United States support replacing Iran's present government but are not in favor of reinstating the monarchy. The man responsible was later identified as Calor Madanescht, who said he intended to join the protest but was attacked by pro-Shah demonstrators after parking his truck. He claimed he drove away to escape the assault and protect himself.

Madanescht was booked into the Los Angeles County Jail with $0 bail, and faced a misdemeanor charge for reckless driving. He was released the following day on his own recognizance. Authorities allege Madanescht deliberately drove the truck into the protest area. Investigators said they do not view the incident as terrorism or politically driven, and said the driver does not have a known criminal record. The FBI was present and working alongside LAPD as investigators assessed the motive, and the case was to be presented to the Los Angeles City Attorney. However, the LA County District Attorney's Office declined to prosecute Madanescht, therefore sending the case back to the city attorney's office.

On 11 January, Turkey barred Iranians from protesting outside the Iranian consulate in Istanbul and cordoned off the area with police.

During the 16 January protests in London, violent clashes ensued, resulting in several protesters being injured and hospitalised, four Metropolitan Police officers being hospitalised, and 14 arrests for offences including violent disorder, assault of an emergency worker, criminal damage, and trespass on diplomatic premises.

After the 17 January protests in Hamburg, two protesters were seriously injured after a stabbing attack, including one critically, leading to three suspects being arrested. The suspects were reportedly Afghan nationals, and authorities stated the attack was premeditated.

On 18 January, following threats from the Islamic Republic, Armenia barred Iranians from protesting in Yerevan and arrested protesters.

Iranians abroad were also the targets of online cybersecurity threats and phishing scams at the time of the protests amid the domestic internet blackout.

On 21 January, it was reported that Turkey, which does not require visas for Iranian citizens, had struck an agreement with the Islamic Republic to arrest and potentially return protesters and refugees who challenge the Iranian government. In cooperation with Turkish President Erdoğan's government, the Islamic Republic has in the past abducted several of its opponents from Turkey and later executed them in Iran.

On 23 January, it was reported that Iranians fleeing the massacres faced violent repression at the Turkish border. By late January, reports emerged of Iranians facing deportation from Turkey.

On 24 January, The Telegraph reported that Iranian dissidents in the United Kingdom were receiving death threats via phone calls and messages from Islamic Republic supporters, threatening to kill them in the UK.

Iranian protesters were also targeted and harassed by pro-Palestinian protesters on 31 January in London.

On 27 January, it was reported that Germany's federal interior ministry had warned members of the Iranian diaspora in Germany of intimidation, harassment, and possible cyber attacks by Iranian state actors.

On 28 January, a federal judge in Manhattan sentenced Carlisle Rivera to 15 years in prison for his role in a plot led by the Islamic Republic to kill Iranian-American dissident Masih Alinejad in 2024. This follows plots by the Islamic Republic in hiring criminals, including Russian mobsters, Mexican cartel hitmen, and a Canadian Hells Angel, to carry out violent acts to silence critics abroad.

On 6 February, Canadian police declared the disappearance of Masoud Masjoudi, an Iranian dissident residing in Canada who protested the influence of the Islamic Republic in Canadian universities, to be a targeted crime, while speculation arose of his suspicious death.

A separate demonstration organised by the MEK took place at Berlin's Brandenburg Gate on 7 February 2026, in solidarity with the nationwide uprising in Iran and calling for the establishment of a democratic republic. Berlin police estimated that between 8,000 and 10,000 people attended. According to the organisers, the demonstration was supported by 344 organisations and political figures, including parliamentary friendship groups, trade unions and civil society organisations from several European countries, as well as 312 Iranian associations across Europe. Speakers included former European Council president Charles Michel, former German economy minister Peter Altmaier and former US Secretary of State Mike Pompeo, who addressed the gathering by video. Maryam Rajavi, president-elect of the National Council of Resistance of Iran, called for regime change through popular sovereignty and rejected both political appeasement and foreign military intervention.

The Guardian reported that the Islamic Republic was monitoring and threatening diaspora journalists and their families over their coverage of the protests.

Iranians abroad also faced intimidation and threats for their online discourse and opinions. An independent research group stated the Islamic Republic had coordinated a large social media influence operation aimed at shaping global narratives. Likewise, another investigative watchdog stated that pro-government editors were active during the crackdown across Wikipedia and other services in deleting content and sanitizing articles related to the Islamic Republic's human rights record.

On 14 February, ahead of the "global day of action" in Toronto, 56-year-old Michael David Holland of Burlington, Ontario was arrested after threatening to target the rally with a firearm to prevent the gathering. Another 26-year-old man from Toronto, Seyed Vorudi, was also arrested for an alleged hate-motivated assault, facing two charges for assault and intent to wear a disguise. Vorudi was previously charged in October 2024 for willful promotion of hatred towards Jewish and LGBTQ communities.

On 23 February, Persian-language network Manoto halted its London-based live broadcast again due to a potential threat warning received from the UK's counterterrorism police perceived to be linked to the Islamic Republic.

=== Violence after 28 February strikes ===
Following the 28 February Israeli–United States strikes on Iran, foreign security officials warned of attacks from sleeper cells abroad. On 1 March, the Austin bar mass shooting was carried out by an American man of Senegalese descent wearing a shirt that read "Property of Allah" and an undershirt bearing the flag of the Islamic Republic of Iran. The same day, a local gym owned by an Iranian-Canadian anti-regime activist located outside Toronto was shot with 17 bullets, hours after Khamenei's death. Los Angeles mayor Karen Bass, whose city hosts the largest Iranian community outside Iran, stated the LAPD would be providing extra security in sensitive areas of the city in the wake of the airstrikes.

In March 2026, it was reported that the Islamic Republic-linked Handala Hack Team placed a $250,000 bounty for the beheading of Iranian-American lawyer and activist Elica Le Bon and Iranian-Canadian former politician and activist Goldie Ghamari after leaking their home addresses to its Jalisco New Generation Cartel partners.

On 4 March, "a small number of isolated incidents" were reported in Manchester between diaspora demonstrators and members of the Islamic Centre of Manchester during the latter's candlelit vigil for Khamenei.

After not singing the national anthem of the Islamic Republic of Iran ahead of their opening game of the Women's Asian Cup in Australia against South Korea as a form of silent protest, the Iranian women's football team was reportedly forced to sing the national anthem prior to their second game against Australia on 5 March, with threats to the players' family members if they did not. After the team's last group stage match against the Philippines on 8 March, members of the team gave what appeared to be SOS hand signals from the bus as they were leaving, leading to protests and growing calls for Australia to offer the team refuge after the players were accused of being wartime traitors by Iranian state media for not singing the national anthem of the Islamic Republic in their opening game amid the Iran war.

On 6 March, London-based Persian-language television network, Iran International, was declared a "legitimate target" for attack by a former Islamic Republic spokesperson. Two years prior, Iran International journalist Pouria Zeraati was stabbed outside his London home following months of threats towards the station's journalists. On 17 March, British politician Jenny Chapman stated the UK will attend to threats against Iran International.

Also on 6 March, British counterterrorism police arrested four people suspected of spying on Jews in London for the Islamic Republic.

The same day, a federal jury in Brooklyn convicted Asif Merchant, a 48-year-old Pakistani man allegedly trained by the IRGC, of a murder-for-hire plot and attempting to kill politicians in the United States, likely in retaliation for the assassination of Qasem Soleimani.

In Moscow, police detained members of the diaspora who celebrated the death of Khamenei.

On 6 March at Washington Square Park in Manhattan, clashes occurred between Khamenei supporters and diaspora counter protesters, leading to multiple arrests being made by the NYPD. In Birmingham, England, Islamic Republic supporters carried pictures of Khamenei while chanting "Allahu Akbar" before burning and stomping on the Israeli flag, leading to clashes with diaspora counter protesters as well. In London, clashes occurred between diaspora celebrants and demonstrators in support of the Islamic Republic near the Islamic Centre of England, leading to one arrest being made the following day.

During the 7 March protests in London against the strikes, which were organized by groups including the Campaign for Nuclear Disarmament, Stop The War, the Palestine Solidarity Campaign, the Muslim Association of Britain, the Palestinian Forum in Britain, and Friends of Al-Aqsa, four people were arrested in total for suspicion of inciting racial hatred, possession of an offensive weapon, racially aggravated public order offences, and violent disorder in relation to an incident the day prior near the Islamic Centre of England.

On 9 March, an Iranian anti-IRGC protester was stabbed and bottled in the North Finchley suburb of London.

Also on 9 March, the Islamic Republic threatened to seize the assets of expatriates and diaspora Iranians along with other legal penalties if they cooperate with nations abroad. On 10 March, the Islamic Republic said that they will go after critics within and outside Iran with seizure of property, arrest, and death, raising fears of another crackdown. On 21 March, the Islamic Republic's intelligence ministry stated it had submitted documents related to fifteen Iranians living abroad to the judiciary for review of asset confiscation. On 5 April, it was reported that Tehran's prosecutor ordered the identification and seizure of assets and bank accounts of more than one hundred Iranian expatriates, including actors, athletes, and staff of media outlets Iran International and Manoto.

On 18 March, a Swedish citizen was executed in Iran by the Islamic Republic. Days prior, an Iranian-Austrian was arrested in Iran. The month prior, a detained British couple were sentenced by the Islamic Revolutionary Court to ten years in prison.

On 19 March, the United States Department of Justice said it shut down websites that spread Islamic Republic propaganda, threatened dissidents abroad, and took credit for hacks. On 20 March, the FBI warned that cyber actors linked to the Islamic Republic's intelligence services were using the social media service Telegram to target dissidents and journalists abroad with malware attacks.

Also on 20 March, the Netherlands tightened security for Iranian dissidents after a man of Iranian descent who is critical of the Islamic Republic was ambushed and shot at his home in Schoonhoven; a 27-year-old man was later arrested in Dortmund, Germany in connection with the shooting.

On 21 March in Birmingham, England's Victoria Square, Iranians demonstrating in a planned protest against the Islamic Republic were attacked with a zombie knife by a group of teenagers; the four teenagers were subsequently arrested on suspicion of violent disorder following the melee.

On 23 March, an Iranian-linked militant group claimed responsibility for arson of Jewish ambulances in northern London.

On 25 March, CNN released a video showing an Iranian diaspora-owned shop in London being vandalized for reportedly having the Lion and Sun flag, one of a series of vandalism incidents targeting Iranian businesses in North London.

On 28 March, it was reported that Iranian expatriates in the United Arab Emirates were having their residency visas canceled and were being repatriated to Iran via Afghanistan. On 1 April, the UAE barred most Iranian nationals from entering or transiting through the country, exempting Golden Visa holders.

Also on 28 March, a foiled bomb attack outside of a Bank of America in Paris was linked to Islamic Republic-linked proxy operatives.

On 29 March, Al Jazeera reported on transnational threats facing the Iranian diaspora, adding that Iranian Americans living in exile feared retribution.

On 4 April, the Associated Press reported that the Islamic Republic was detaining family members and threatening to seize the assets of Iranian opposition figures in exile to silence them.

On 15 April, an attempted arson attack at the London studios of Iran International led to three arrests by the Metropolitan Police.

On 18 April, an Iranian man described to be an opponent of the Iranian government was assaulted in London.

On 23 April, Reza Pahlavi was splattered with red liquid in Berlin.

On 27 April, Canadian politician Costas Menegakis stated Iranian Canadians live in fear of intimidation from the Islamic Republic on Canadian soil, and called for the identification and removal of IRGC operatives in Canada.

Also on 27 April, a memorial in London dedicated to victims of the 2026 Iran massacres was targeted in a suspected arson attack.

On 29 April, two Jewish men were stabbed in Golders Green, London as part of the 2026 London antisemitic attacks and the broader antisemitic incidents during the Iran war; a British national born in Somalia was arrested, and the Iran-linked Harakat Ashab al-Yamin al-Islamia claimed responsibility.

On 5 May, pro-Islamic Republic graffiti was reported in Los Angeles as a form of intimidation against the diaspora community, while in a separate incident, a nearby memorial dedicated to slain Iranian protesters was vandalized.

During a diaspora protest against the Islamic Republic on 10 May in Berlin, Kowsar Eftekhari, who had been shot and blinded in the eye during the 2022 Iranian protests, was attacked by pro-Palestinian counter-protesters who shouted "Allahu Akbar".

On 9 June, a judge in Iran stated the ongoing confiscation of exiled Iranians' assets would weaken the diaspora anti-regime protests.

== Reactions ==
Notable figures in the Iranian diaspora voiced their reactions and opinions to the protests in Iran. Maryam Rajavi, co-leader of the People's Mojahedin Organisation of Iran (MEK), said that protesters have "struck fear into a weakened enemy", warning security forces who obey orders to crackdown on the protests that "the courts of a free Iran are awaiting (you)."

Gissou Nia, a human rights lawyer and Iran expert, stated that while the economic crisis was the catalyst for the protest, the slogans and behaviour of the protesters show a profound dissatisfaction with the Iranian government and a desire to overthrow it.

Iranian dissident and Nobel laureate Shirin Ebadi condemned Iranian security forces for directly shooting unarmed protesters in Fasa, calling it a human rights violation. In a message shared on Instagram, Ebadi stressed that using live ammunition against unarmed civilians cannot be justified. She urged authorities to immediately stop the violence, ensure proper medical care for those injured, and investigate who authorised the use of live fire against protesters in Fasa. During the internet blackout, she claimed the Iranian government may carry out a massacre under cover of a sweeping communications blackout, encouraging Western governments to speak out immediately.

Masih Alinejad, an Iranian-American journalist and human rights activist, stated that President Donald Trump's message to Iran gave people a "strong message" of hope, and that he is on the right side of history. After the massacres, Alinejad denounced the US-Iran negotiations, stating the Islamic Republic shoots protesters and tortures for confessions.

Goldie Ghamari, a Canadian-Iranian activist and former politician, stated that "Iranians are more determined than ever to overthrow the Islamic Republic", "it's life or death", "Iranians have nothing left to lose, and these are the true freedom fighters of the 21st century", and that "the Iranian national revolution is anti-Islam, anti-Islamic, anti sharia law; it's pro-revolution, pro-shah".

British-Iranian actress and activist Nazanin Boniadi urged Hollywood to stand with Iran's protesters.

Ali Karimi, a former footballer for the Iran national football team, spoke at a January rally in Los Angeles and called for political change in Iran. He also wrote an open letter to FIFA and all its member football associations, calling on FIFA president Gianni Infantino to speak up on the protest deaths.

Kimia Alizadeh, Iran's first female Olympic medalist, attended the diaspora protests and stated detained protesters in Iran were being executed.

Many Iranians within Iran have stated that the diaspora rallies abroad give them renewed hope.

After the start of the Iran war, Iranians across social media began gathering cases of repression and neglect in Iran linked to government mismanagement, arguing that the suffering long predates the current war.
