= Reactions to the 2025–2026 Iranian protests =

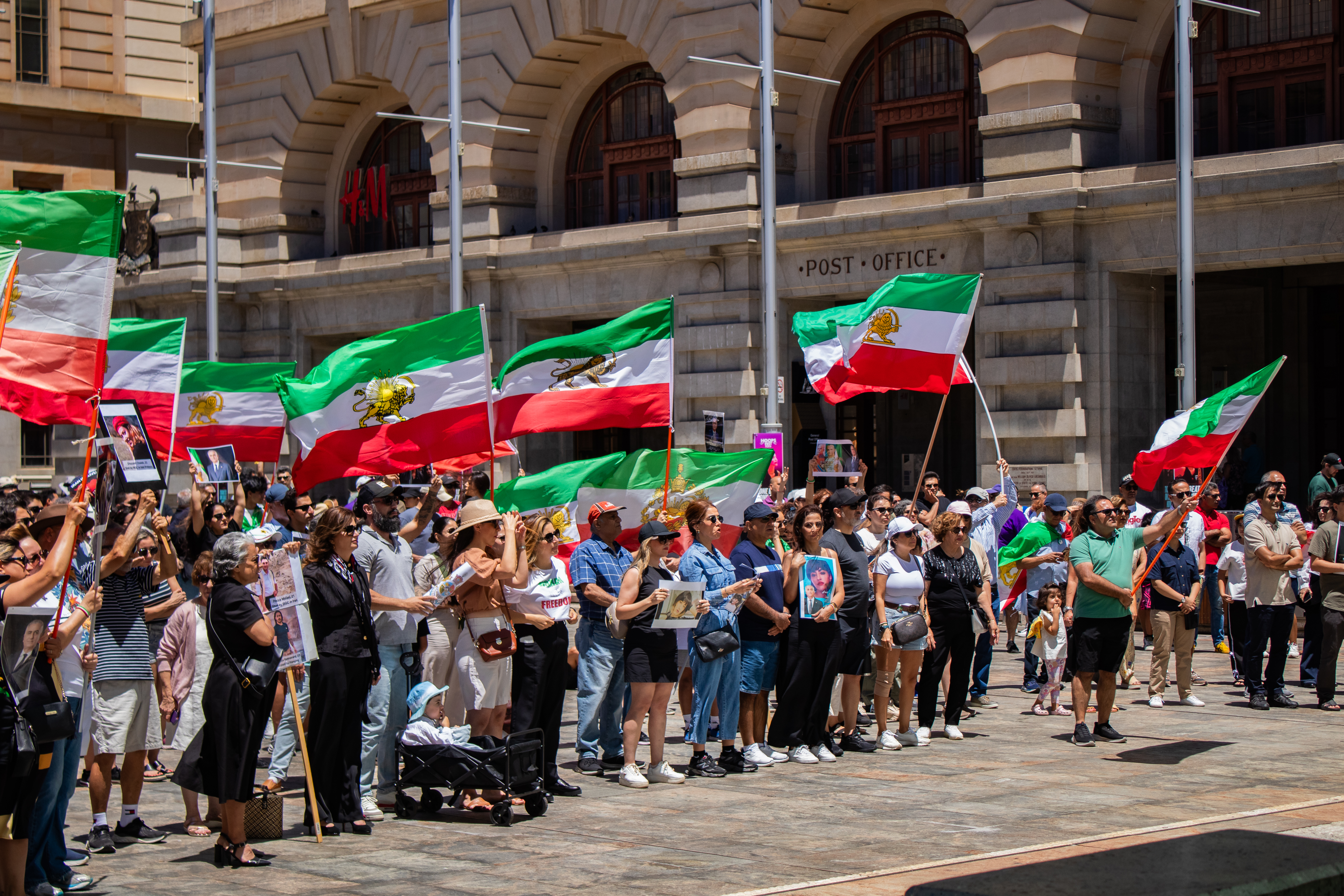
A solidarity rally against the Islamic Republic in Perth, Australia, 10 January 2026

Iranian officials and institutions, both from the Islamic Republic and the opposition; as well as foreign governments, international organizations, and public figures, issued varied responses to the 2025–2026 Iranian protests. The demonstrations were followed by a nationwide internet shutdown and a violent security crackdown. Human rights organizations and media outlets reported nationwide massacres of protesters.

Iranian state authorities defended the crackdown of protests and portrayed the unrest as "violent" or "foreign-backed". In contrast, opposition figures and activists accused the government of ordering or carrying out mass killings of demonstrators. As of 25 February 2026, estimates of the death toll ranged from 3,000 to 36,500, making them some of the largest massacres in modern Iranian history.

Foreign governments and international organizations, particularly in Western countries, condemned the reported use of live ammunition and the high number of fatalities. Several called for accountability and independent international investigations into the violence and warned of potential diplomatic or economic consequences. The United Nations discussed the situation in emergency meetings and human rights forums. Civil society groups, Iranian diaspora communities, and public figures around the world also organized demonstrations and urged stronger international responses in response to the mass killings.

Following the protests that began on 14 January, the Iranian regime declared it would arrest anyone who had been on the streets on criminal charges. The Iranian penal system also declared they would create a database of all past and future possible crimes of protestors and their family members. Iran’s supreme leader Ali Khamenei criticized U.S. President Trump for comments regarding the protests, describing him as "a criminal" and "inexperienced" and accusing him of interfering in Iran's affairs. Trump has called Khamenei "a sick criminal".

The Iranian government shut down the reformist newspaper Ham-Mihan and threatened athletes and public figures who publicly supported the demonstrations. It also imposed extensive security measures in major cities, including machine guns, tanks, drones, snipers, and checkpoints, with soldiers raiding houses and searching door to door in order to arrest protestors. According to several reports, a member of the Iranian armed forces was sentenced to death after refusing orders to fire on civilians.

U.S. Treasury Secretary Scott Bessent stated that U.S. authorities had tracked Iranian officials transferring funds abroad, which he interpreted as an indication that some were preparing to leave the country. Iranian opposition figure Reza Pahlavi criticized the regime’s response to the protests, describing it as a campaign of genocidal repression against Iranians. Khamenei's representative to the IRGC, Abdollah Hajji Sadeghi, called for war, calling the Iranian people "our atom bomb". Foreign Minister Abbas Araghchi warned that "war with Iran will be long and extend throughout the region." Iranian regime-aligned Wikipedia editors have attempted to revise, manipulate, and delete Wikipedia articles' accounts of the massacres.

On 19 January, FARAJA General Ahmed Radan gave a three day ultimatum to everyone involved in any way in the protests, telling them to give themselves up to the police.

The Tehran Stock Exchange reportedly lost 8000 billion toman in total market value two times. Merchants received allowances of 20 minutes of limited internet visiting times at the hall of the Tehran Chamber of Commerce.

China has reportedly sent 16 military cargo aircraft to aid the Iranian government.

On 27 January, Middle East Eye reported the United States was considering strikes on the Iranian regime and military as soon as that week. That same day, the Iranian Government Deputy of Digital Economy was fired for criticizing class-based internet domain access. That same day Trump threatened the Iranian regime that the next round of attacks would cause "major destruction". RadioFarda described the Iranian armed forces as "Practically Naked". Spokeswoman Mohajerani stated that Iran would not start a war but would defend itself. Iran's rial, fell to its lowest record of 1.5 million to $1. LeMonde described the effects of regime massacres in Iran as collective shock. The Chief of the General Staff of the Iranian Armed Forces, Abdulrahim Moussavi, threatened that "Without the IRGC, no name of Iran would remain".

On 27 January, the Iranian regime relayed emergency executive powers to provinces for purposes of government continuity and to accelerate the import of basic commodities. On 28 January, it partially restored internet against the threat of US military intervention. It also started apprehending doctors, one sentenced to death.

Ali Shamkhani, Advisor to Supreme Leader Ali Khamenei, threatened an "unprecedented response" consisting of a declaration of war and preemptive strikes against the United States and Israel.

A list of offspring of Iranian regime officials abroad was posted online on January 28th.

On 30 January, Iranian Foreign Minister Abbas Iraqchi called the foreign ministries of six Muslim countries (Qatar, Egypt, the UAE, Pakistan, Oman, and Turkey) and went to Turkey to visit FM Hakan Fidan and President Erdoğan.

The New York Times wrote that "Iran enjoys diplomatic cover from Moscow and Beijing, The EU condemns but lacks further leverage. Arab leaders prefer a weakened Iran that brutalizes its own people to a liberated Iran that inspires imitation. Campus activists and global do-gooders who profess deep concern for Palestinian lives but show little interest in Iranian ones. It's left to the United States to impose meaningful consequences on the Iranian regime for one of the worst atrocities of this century."

== Sit-in ==
After the massacres, students from 30 universities across Iran announced staged sit-ins, including in medical universities, the government had to switch to online classes and exams for the next semesters as well, the Minister of Health's deputy announced a program to alleviate psychological trauma suffered by students.

== Defections ==
An Iranian diplomat applied for asylum in Switzerland. Elnaz Shakerdoost ended her career over the massacre.

== Executions ==
According to an opinion piece by Lawdan Bazargan in Iran International, the regime was repeating the 1988 summer massacre at scale. At least 50,000 people were arrested. IRGC armed troops raided hospitals shooting wounded protestors.

An analysis by Joseph Epstein, of the Yorktown Institute, suggested Velayat-e Faqih would put ideology over strategy and execute people in large numbers, designating them as Moharebeh ("enemies of God") and baghi ("armed rebellion"). The government penal system stated they will charge public disruptors with Moharebeh. National wrestling team wrestler Saleh Mohammadi was sentenced to public execution, held at the Qom town square.

== Sanctions ==
The Australian reported that Australia was abetting sanctioned IRGC General Yahya Safavi’s daughter Haniyah Rahim Safavi by recently approving her permanent residency. The Australian government stated she will not be deported. Australia started sanctions against FARAJA Cmdr. Ahmed Reza Radan, Minister of Intelligence Esmail Khatib, Deputy Cmdr. IRGC-QF Mohammedreza Falah, Mohamed Saleh Jokar MP, Islamic Revolutionary Guard Corps Cyber Command, IRGC-QF Unit 840.

European sanctions targeted Eskandar Momeni Kalagari, Iran’s Minister of the Interior and Head of the National Security Council, and members of Iran’s judicial system including Mohammad Movahedi-Azad, the Prosecutor General, and Iman Afshari, a presiding judge. Bloomberg News highlighted that Mojtaba Khamenei has mansions in north London and a property empire worth hundreds of millions of dollars in the West.

OFAC sanctioned six individuals: General Majid Khademi, General Ghorban Mohammad Valizadeh, General Hossein Zare Kamali, General Hamid Damghani, General Mehdi Hajian, and Babak Morteza Zanjani, the last described as "a criminal Iranian investor who previously embezzled billions [sic] of dollars in Iranian oil revenue that rightfully belonged to the Iranian people and was never fully recovered."

== US-Iran talks ==
On February 2, Pezeshkian's government ordered a restart and resumption of negotiations on a US deal. Axios reported that America had set 6 conditions for a possible deal with the Islamic republic. Trump has warned Iran 'time is running out'.

1. Limiting missile range
2. Bringing the remainder of enriched uranium out of the country
3. Halting support for proxy forces in the region
4. Halting the enrichment of uranium inside Iran

== War crimes ==
There have been reports of living protestors being shoved into body bags, while there was a shortage of body bags amidst reports of full morgues. One protestor hid in a body bag among dead bodies for 3 days in order to survive. The government also used garbage trucks to transport bodies of teens killed.

The Guardian reported some soldiers disobeyed burying the victims in mass graves fearing reprisals.

IRGC forces shot at crowds of scattering people as they were running away.

== Military ==
The Iranian government ordered the closure of its airspace on 25 January.

Ayatollah Akberi Imam of Tehran Friday prayer told people that they would launch missiles and attack countries in the region where there have been trillions of dollars in American investment.

The Kurdistan Freedom Party claimed a missile attack on their positions by Iran.

Turkey started building up along their border for Iranian refugees from possible attacks on Iran.

The Iranian regime put Chinese facial recognition tech that was used in the Uyghur genocide on the streets.

== Communication blackouts ==
Sattar Hashemi, the Minister of ICT, claimed that the internet shutdown would only be temporary. According to BBC and Radio Farda, to keep the internet censorship going, Iran kept small portion of the population in the country unaffected by internet disruption. The blackout has been labeled as collective punishment.

The Iranian government's Headquarters for Enjoining the Good and Forbidding the Evil called on the government to fully cut off internet access.

Radio Farda started shortwave broadcasts in Iran. On 12 February, the BBC reported the Iranian regime had resorted to cutting Sim cards of dissidents and mobile phone and internet connections for a lot of people.

Iranians worldwide downloaded the Psiphon Conduit app on their devices to help Iranians inside Iran get connected to the Internet.

Iranian regime websites show that officials were contradicting each other on if the internet would ever be restored

Source	Statements
Ministry of Communications Announcement	The decision on the certainty of the Internet has been made by the security authorities.; The Ministry of Communications is pursuing communication.; The results of the actions will be subsequently notified
Abbas Araghchi Foreign Minister	Connecting the Internet soon with full security deployment: Enseries for faster Internet connection of embassies
Sattar Hashemi Minister of Communications	We're seriously following up.; This decision was made according to the security situation and by the security authorities.
Sattar Hashemi Minister of Communications	We're looking for a return on communications and the Internet.; The Internet must return to normal with the approval of the relevant security authorities
Fatemeh Mohajerani Government Spokesman	Proportionate the government is not Internet access disruption.; This decision was made by the security agencies.; We hope to see the right to free access to the Internet as soon as possible.
Fars News Agency	There will be no change in the status of Internet access until the actions of the terror cores are subsided.
Vice President of Science	Consultation with the National Center for Cyberspace and the Ministry of Communications to remove or reduce the access restrictions of some major IT companies
Sitna News Agency	Network tests are underway to prepare for an international internet connection. By controlling security threats, a decision will be made to establish international communications of the country.
Mohammad Siraj Member of the Parliament's Social Committee	The Internet will be available tomorrow (Monday ٢٩ D) or finally Tuesday, December 30th.
Masoud Medekian President	The Supreme National Security Council to remove internet restrictions as soon as possible
Hossein Afshin Vice President of Science	The Internet will be slowly back to normal by the end of the week.
Reza Al-Afat Nasab President of the Virtual Business Union	The Internet is back to normal these days.
Hossein Delirian Spokesperson of the National Cyberspace Center	Internet of merchants and merchants established
Mohammad Aratianfar Member of Government Information Council	The internet is likely to be connected next week.
Ali Akbar Pourjamshidian Secretary of the State Security Council	You can’t tell the exact time for the internet connection.
Jafar Ghaempanah Executive Vice President	The Internet must be connected; how long can we cut it?; We hope we don't have the instability of the Internet anymore.
Farshid Shokrokhodai Member of Chamber of Commerce	The merchants' Internet is not yet connected.; -Traders are in line and check in an email room
Computer Trade Union Organization of the country (Nasr)	Connecting a number of companies, including cryptocurrency exchanges, to the international Internet
Fars News Agency	The process of international Internet connection began yesterday (Thursday, February); The re-connection of the international Internet was announced to the Ministry of Communications after approval by the Supreme National Security Council.; The Internet will be fully established in all provinces in the next 24 hours (Saturday, February 4th)
Iran Cooperative Chamber	International Internet for Economic Activists in the Cooperative Sector
Yousef Median Son of the President	I don't know when the internet will connect.
Ministry of Communications	The claim of the Persian news agency is denied.: The Internet connection order has not been communicated
Vice President of Science	The Internet of Digital Businesses will be established in the next two days

== Government institutions ==
The Ministry of Labor lost their entire data and its backup for undeclared reasons.

The Iranian regime shut down, schools, colleges, dorms and banks for weeks. The Supreme Court of Iran demanded the National Information Network be deployed immediately. The Government arrested lawyers in several cities according to their lawyers.

The Government has banned people from selling their own food stamps for cash.

== Cyber ==
The Government has denied cyber attacks have been successful at Bank Sepah and Minister of ICT Information Technology Organization.

X removed the Islamic Republic flag and replaced it with the Lion and Sun flag in its emoji implementation.

The regime confiscated 158 personal Starlink terminal satellite dish/routers.

Radio France Internationale's Aabla Jounaïdi reported that regime trolls were discrediting anyone who managed to rally support.

=== AI ===
According to reporting by France 24 and Deutsche Welle, state-linked media in Iran, such as the Fars News Agency, highlighted AI-generated images circulating on social media to portray genuine photographs of morgues and casualties as fabricated, as part of an effort to cast doubt on reports of mass fatalities. In January 2026, during a sermon in Mashhad, Iranian cleric Ahmad Alamolhoda accused foreign media outlets of using artificial intelligence to superimpose anti-regime slogans onto footage of public economic protests to falsely suggest widespread opposition to the Islamic Republic.

== International travel and aviation ==
Amid the unrest, several international airlines cancelled flights to and from Iran. On 9 January 2026, Dubai Airports' website showed at least 17 flydubai flights between Dubai and Iranian cities were cancelled. Turkish Airlines cancelled 17 flights, while Turkish carriers AJet and Pegasus also cancelled flights to Iranian destinations. Hamad International Airport's website showed at least two Doha–Tehran flights were cancelled. IndiGo and Air India also altered flight routes around Iran and flights overflowing Iranian airspace were cancelled temporarily after 26 January.

== Responsibility to protect ==
On 13 January, Hengaw argued that the massacres of protesters were crimes against humanity under customary international law and the Rome Statute, and called for the 2005 Responsibility to protect (R2P) political commitment of the United Nations General Assembly to be invoked. Hengaw called for "the international community [to] seriously consider all lawful mechanisms provided under international law, including binding coercive measures under the Charter of the United Nations" of which the aim is "not political intervention, but the immediate and effective protection of civilian lives and the cessation of mass killings".

Estimated deathtoll/casualty number	Sources
Over >36500	Iranintl
Top >30,000	Various
12,000–20,000	CBS News / Iran International
16,500–18,000	The Sunday Times
>12,000	Iran International estimate
4,029–13,078	HRANA
>5,000	Iranian officials

== Local responses ==
=== Government and state institutions ===
==== IRIB ====
IRIB aired 240 forced confessions.

IRIB anchor mocked the frozen corpse of massacre victims. IRIB attempted to show that things have calmed down.

An IRIB network channel director was fired after a reporter on appeared to say "Death to Khamenei" during the Iranian revolution anniversary rally.

IRIB cut the live broadcast of President Pezeshkian after said channel 6 is campaigning against its presidency.

==== Islamic Revolutionary Guard Corps ====
High ranking generals associated with the Islamic Revolutionary Guard Corps (IRGC) have threatened protestors and American president Trump including General Javani, General Rahim Safavi, General Vahidi, General Abdelrahim Mosavi, General Ali Abdellahi, General Ghorbani, General Karami, and General Shekarchi.

Nobel Peace Prize Laureate Shirin Ebadi has called for taking out IRGC commanders.

==== Cabinet ====
Iranian National Tax Administration made 90% of businesses tax exempt for the rest of year.

The Ministry of Welfare and Social Security, Ministry of Industry, Mine and Trade, Ministry of Economic Affairs and Finance have started a new scheme to pay Iranian families subsidies, amounting $7 per month per person. It will be deposited to the National Credit Network, with this money each person can buy some selected items from 9 designated food items.

==== Supreme Leader ====
Ali Khamenei, the Supreme Leader of Iran, said, "We talk to the protesters, but the rioters must be put in their place." On 17 January 2026, Khamenei stated that thousands of individuals had been killed, "some in an inhuman, savage manner", and attributed responsibility for these deaths to the United States and Israel. Khamenei's X profile had posted that "We will not surrender to the enemy", to which Elon Musk replied "زهی خیال باطل" (roughly translated as "delusional thinking"). Khamenei also called protestors "harmful individuals for the country". On 24 January, Khamenei went into hiding in underground bunker tunnel space. In response, protesters on social media began mocking Khamenei with the nickname "Moush-Ali" (Rat-Ali).

===== Supreme Defense Council =====
Defense council has warned that they would be launching preemptive strikes.

==== Supreme National Security Council ====
SNSC ordered a issued an information blackout media gag order.

===== Security council =====
Security council has stated that they do not know the time at which the internet would be restored.

===== Expediency discernment council =====
IRGC General Mohsen Rezaei has threatened that they have to end the ceasefire with Israel due to Trump's rhetoric.

==== President ====
President Masoud Pezeshkian stated in a televised broadcast, "We are at total war with Israel, Europe, and the United States of America", and said that "if we do not resolve the issue of people's livelihoods, we will end up in hell".

==== Former President ====
On February 23, 2026, former Iranian president Mohammad Khatami expressed sympathy with the families of the victims and wishing a speedy recovery for the injured, and he called for the release of those arrested solely for protesting and social helplessness. He also emphasized the need for clear and credible explanations of the incidents, identifying the culprits, halting arrests, summonses, and the issuance of inappropriate verdicts against intellectuals, artists, and political activists. The former president of Iran expressed hope that university issues would be resolved with wisdom and calm, without political, security, or social violence. He also regarded the upcoming negotiations between Iran and the U.S. as important and expressed hope that these talks would lead to a reduction in the problems and threats faced by the people of Iran and the region. Contrary to the goals of regional adversaries, Khatami hoped that a path of peace, progress, and regional security would be pursued.

==== Iranian Parliament ====
On 20 January, as tensions with the US were running high, the Iranian Parliament threatened that any attack on Supreme Leader, Ayatollah Ali Khamenei would lead to Jihad.

The security commission has called for assassinating Trump for his role in the protests.

The legal commission stated there is no problem in the country, but for enemies.

Tehran representative called Trump "Yellow Yankee Animal Buffalo".

==== Reformists Front ====
According to Iran International, amid concerns over the collapse of the Islamic Republic and the fall of Ali Khamenei, in addition to the increasing number of protesters killed by security forces, the Central Council of the Iranian Reform Front held an emergency meeting behind closed doors, at the conclusion of which a statement was drafted, calling for the resignation of Khamenei and the transmission of state control to a "transitional council". However, upon learning of the statement, security forces issued "heavy and blatant" threats to the leaders of the alliance as well as warnings of widespread arrests, and the statement was withdrawn.

==== Other senior officials ====
FARAJA Chief Shirazi stated that the Islamic Republic is not defeatable. Fatemeh Mohajerani, the government spokesperson, stated on social media that the government acknowledges the protests and that it would also hear "harsh voices."

On 7 January, Iranian army commander-in-chief Gen. Amir Hatami said Iran viewed escalating "hostile rhetoric" as a threat and would respond if it continued, after U.S. President Donald Trump and Israeli Prime Minister Benjamin Netanyahu voiced support for the protests.

Iranian Chief Justice Gholam-Hossein Mohseni-Eje'i warned that there would be "no leniency" for those he said were helping "the enemy" amid continuing unrest and blamed the United States and Israel for using "hybrid" methods to destabilize Iran.

Mohammad Bagher Ghalibaf, Speaker of the Islamic Consultative Assembly, said that "malicious individuals and organised movements" sought to turn demands into "chaos", while also stating that public livelihood-related concerns should be addressed responsibly. Qalibaf threatened that Iran will attack all U.S. bases in the Middle East if the U.S. military strikes Iran.

Amoli Larijani, Head of the Expediency Discernment Council, said "criticism and demands are the right of the nation", but argued they should not be expressed in a way that signals to Iran's "enemies".

Foreign minister Abbas Araghchi called on U.S. President Donald Trump to reopen negotiations in an op-ed published in The Guardian, according to Iran International. Araghchi also said that he views the demonstrations of Iranians abroad protesting against the regime as "very dangerous". Araghchi engaged in a diplomatic dispute with German Chancellor Friedrich Merz concerning Iran’s domestic protests and the conflict in Gaza. Merz condemned the Iranian regime’s "brutal violence" against protesters, characterizing the crackdown as a "sign of weakness" and asserting that the regime was in its "final days." In response, Araghchi argued that Germany’s credibility on human rights had been "obliterated" by its support for Israel’s military actions in Gaza. Araghchi had later denied Iran beginning negotiations.

Ahmad-Reza Radan, Iran's national police chief stated on 19 January, that those who were "deceived" into taking part in the demonstrations, or "riots" as the government defines them, had three days to turn themselves in.

Bahraini cleric Sheikh Issa Qasem said millions of Iranians are ready for sacrifice for Khamenei.

IRGC intelligence chief Majid Khademi claimed that "foreign agents" instructed protesters to shoot each other in order to increase the death count and increase the chances of an American attack.

==== Defections ====
On 18 January, a Ministry of Interior official sent an audio message to Iran International stating that he had defected, in the sense that he had participated in the protests, where he witnessed security forces firing on protesters using Heckler & Koch G3 rifles, and in response to a call by Reza Pahlavi, he had stayed home from work. The official described the government as "ruthless". The official remained anonymous for security reasons.

=== State actions and economic measures ===
On 31 December 2025, after a government building was attacked in Fasa, authorities placed almost the entire country on leave until 4 January 2026, while stating that the reasons were cold weather and energy saving.

The government paused subsidising the rial-to-U.S.-dollar exchange rate, a method long used to support imports and curb inflation.

The Iranian government imported 800 members of foreign militias to quell the protests.

In early February, the Iranian government began a campaign to arrest reformist activists, especially those who are close to President Masoud Pezeshkian.

=== Resignations ===
After the Iranian rial hit a record low, Mohammad Reza Farzin resigned as the leader of the Central Bank of Iran and was replaced with Abdolnaser Hemmati.

Vice President Mohammad Reza Aref tendered his resignation, but it was not accepted by President Pezeshkian.

Mehdi Sanaei, the Political Advisor to the President, also resigned.

=== State media ===
Fars News Agency described the strike and demonstrations as "riots" and warned of individuals allegedly infiltrating bazaars to turn economic slogans into political ones.

An IRGC-affiliated local outlet connected to the IRGC Lorestan provincial barracks claimed that protesters were being provided ammunition and firearms by trucks without licence plates.

=== Reactions by public figures ===
Former IRGC General Mohammad Ali Jafari warned Iran would deliver a "crushing blow" in the event of another attack by Israel.

Prominent jailed reformist politician Mostafa Tajzadeh criticised the government's handling of the economic crisis and called for political change, while also stressing that "peaceful protest is the inalienable legal right of citizens".

Mehdi Taremi, captain of Iran's national football team, called on officials to listen to public demands and commented on worsening economic conditions. Former Iran national team captain, Masoud Shojaei, criticised FIFA for its silence over the killing of Iranian athletes during the protests.

A doctor was quoted by The Sunday Times on 17 January as describing the killings as "genocide under cover of digital darkness".

== Public response ==
Foreign Affairs Sanam Vakil reported that Iranian opposition is divided and not unified and non threatening to Iranian regime.

Several filmmakers boycotted the Fajr Film Festival.

On 8 February, it was reported that Iranians inside Iran pleaded with Trump not to negotiate with the Islamic Republic after the massacres in the country. Likewise, an Iranian man from Bushehr, Pouria Hamidi, posted a video appealing to Trump and Western governments to refrain from any deals with the Islamic Republic, before taking his own life. Among Iranians inside Iran as well as across the Iranian diaspora, calls grew for American military strikes on Iran.

In mid-February, it was reported that schools had transitioned from learning spaces to areas characterized by increased surveillance and interrogation, resulting in some families stopping to send their children to school.

=== Sport ===
Croatia, Russia and Saudi Arabia refused to issue travel visa for Iran national wrestling and cycling teams. Two female national basketball team athletes announced they have quit to protest the massacres. Zahra Alizadeh also announced her withdrawal from the Iran women's national football team, becoming one of a number of athletes resigning from their respective Iranian national teams. The AFC ruled that Iranian clubs cannot host AFC Champions League Elite and AFC Champions League Two matches at home following the massacres, and would therefore have to move them to neutral venues. Former Iran national team captain Masoud Shojaei criticised FIFA for its silence over the killing of Iranian athletes during protests, while then-captain Mehdi Taremi expressed solidarity with the Iranian people. Former national team footballer Ali Karimi spoke at a January diaspora rally in Los Angeles and called for political change in Iran. He also wrote an open letter to FIFA and all its member football associations, calling on FIFA president Gianni Infantino to speak up on the protest deaths. Following the massacres, activists called on FIFA and the IOC to ban the Iranian teams from the 2026 FIFA World Cup and the 2026 Winter Olympics. Following the protests and ensuing crackdown, the Spanish Football Federation reportedly pulled out of a planned friendly match with Iran.

After a number of players resigned from the Iran women's national football team and refereeing organization following the massacres, the Iranian football federation reportedly threatened them with multi-year bans from professional football activities, judicial action, and long prison sentences. In March 2026, after the Iran women's national football team players refused to sing the national anthem of the Islamic Republic as a form of silent protest ahead of their 2026 AFC Women's Asian Cup opener against South Korea, concerns grew for their safety following threats from Iranian state media. Ahead of the following match against Australia, the national team players were reportedly forced to sing the national anthem of the Islamic Republic of Iran, with threats to the players' family members if they did not. After the team's exit from the tournament on 8 March, members of the team gave what appeared to be SOS hand signals from the bus as they were leaving, leading to protests and growing calls for Australia to offer the team refuge after the players were accused of being wartime traitors by Iranian state media for not singing the national anthem of the Islamic Republic in their opening game amid the Iran war.

== International reactions ==
=== Iranian studies scholars ===
A group of Iranian studies scholars issued a statement expressing support for the people of Iran.

=== France ===
The French opposed recognizing IRGC a designated terror foreign group.

=== Yemen ===
Ansarullah Houthis threatened that they would engage if Iran was attacked.

=== Lebanon ===
Hezbollah said they are no longer remaining neutral.

=== Iraq ===
Kataib Hezbollah declared Jihad and called for mobilization in support of the Iranian regime.

The Naqshbandi Army voiced their support for the protests.

=== Turkey ===
Turkey's FM said they would continue importing Iranian oil and gas.

=== Russia ===
Sergey Lavrov stated that I see no reasons to stop joint projects with Iran.

=== Arab nations ===
Arab states opposed an attack on Iran for them to be able to gain more concessions. UAE and Saudi Arabia denied airspace from United States military.

=== Afghanistan ===
The Afghan Taliban stated on 15 February that they would support the Islamic Republic in the event of a US attack.

=== Reza and Farah Pahlavi ===
On 20 January, Reza Pahlavi addressed Ali Khamenei saying, "Just as the Nazi criminals were tried and punished in Nuremberg, you and your accomplices will be tried and punished in the court of the Iranian nation." Addressing the Iranian people he said "You are not alone; your resistance has changed history. This regime has broken away and its downfall has begun." He also urged the people to prepare for a broader return to the streets, promising that the day of reclaiming Iran was near. In February 2025, in an interview with The Daily Telegraph, Pahlavi called on Europe and Americans to prepare for impending collapse of regime in Tehran.

Farah Pahlavi, widow of the Shah, stated in an interview with Agence France-Presse, that "there is no turning back" after the protests, conveying admiration for Iranians and saying that "for 47 years (she) wished (and) waited for Iran's freedom." She added that her return to Iran "will take place soon."

Pahlavi declared 14 February as a "global day of action," with major diaspora solidarity rallies that took place in Los Angeles, Toronto, and Munich. Over 250,000 attended the 14 February rally in Munich, while the Toronto and Los Angeles rallies each drew 350,000 in attendance. Protesters within Iran responded to Pahlavi's calls to chant anti-government slogans from rooftops and windows during the rallies abroad. Nevertheless, analysts say Pahlavi's support inside Iran is hard to gauge due to his polarizing reputation. Critics accuse him of overstating his popularity and say they have faced harassment from some of his supporters.

=== Iranian diaspora ===
The Iranian diaspora held solidarity rallies worldwide, with some facing violence and threats during the demonstrations.

On 11 January, a U-Haul Ford F-650 truck (with Alabama Venture) was used to ram into a crowd of anti-Iranian government protesters in Westwood, Los Angeles, California. The solidarity rally in support of the Iranian protesters was scheduled to start at 2 p.m. outside of the Wilshire Federal Building in the 11000 block of Wilshire Boulevard, and the vehicle plowed into a crowd estimated at more than 3,000 people at around 3:34 pm. At least two people were injured. The truck displayed a sign saying: "No Shah. No Regime. USA: Don't Repeat 1953. No Mullah." A similar slogan, "No to Shah, No to Mullahs", has been used by the National Council of Resistance of Iran, which is the political wing of the People's Mojahedin Organization of Iran (MEK). Many Iranians on social media pointed out that the messaging on the side of the truck is commonly associated with supporters of the MEK. Before the attack, a crowd of more than 3,000 protesters was demonstrating in Westwood, Los Angeles, near a federal building, in support of the Iranian protesters. Officers with the Los Angeles Police Department secured the area surrounding the truck, which showed visible damage, including a shattered windshield and broken windows, after crowds attacked the vehicle. According to the Los Angeles Police Department, Calor Madanescht, 48, was staging a counterdemonstration as he approached protesters gathered near the Federal Building in Westwood. Investigators said the truck was searched and impounded, but nothing significant was found inside. Madanescht was booked into the Los Angeles County Jail with $0 bail, and faced a misdemeanor charge for reckless driving. He was released the following day on his own recognizance. Authorities allege Madanescht deliberately drove the truck into the protest area. Investigators said they do not view the incident as terrorism or politically driven, and said the driver does not have a known criminal record. The FBI was present and working alongside LAPD as investigators assessed the motive, and the case was to be presented to the Los Angeles City Attorney. However, the LA County District Attorney's Office declined to prosecute Madanescht, therefore sending the case back to the city attorney's office.

=== Argentina ===
Argentina's Foreign Ministry advised against travel to Iran amid protests and social tension. On 17 January, Argentine president Javier Milei designated IRGC's Quds Force as a terrorist organization.

=== Australia ===
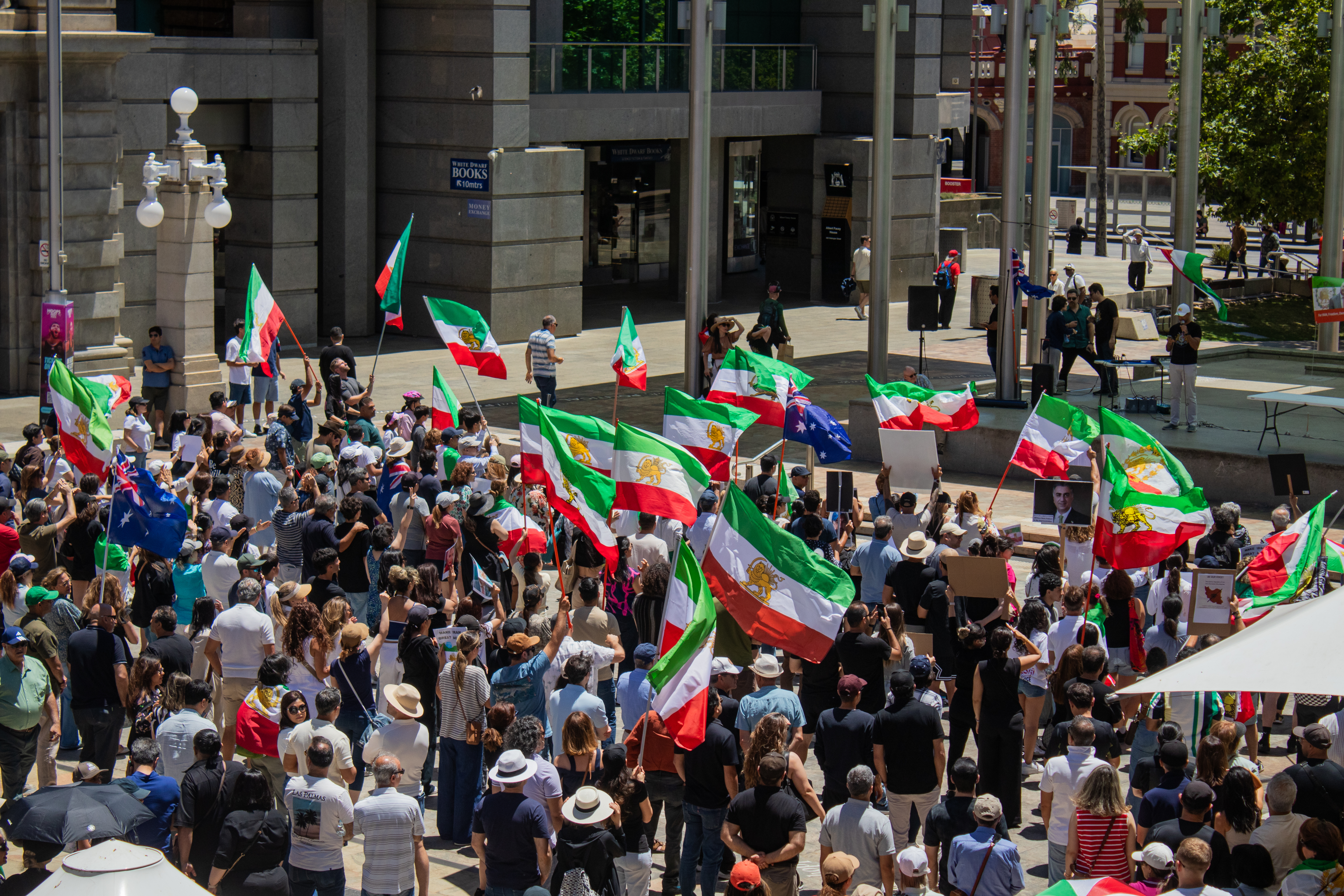
Iranian diaspora holding a solidarity rally in Perth, Australia, on 10 January 2026 against the Islamic Republic

Australia's Foreign Ministry stated that the Australian government condemned the violence committed by Iranian authorities and called on Iran to respect the rights of peaceful protesters. The Australian embassy in Iran shut down its operations. Australian citizens were urged by the government to leave Iran as soon as possible due to violent crackdowns and arrests carried out by Iranian security forces.

Iranian Australians have staged demonstrations across major cities, including Sydney and Brisbane in solidarity with the anti-government protests in Iran, following a deadly crackdown by the Islamic Republic. Protesters gathered outside locations such as Sydney Town Hall and at rallies like Brisbane's "All Eyes on Iran," condemning Iran's economic collapse, corruption, and the killing of demonstrators by security forces. Organizers and speakers from advocacy groups said the rallies aimed to amplify the voices of Iranians facing violent repression, called for the end of Ayatollah Ali Khamenei's regime, and expressed support for exiled Crown Prince Reza Pahlavi, urging the Australian government and international community to stand with the Iranian people.

On 13 January 2026, Sky News Australia reported that Prime Minister Anthony Albanese and Foreign Minister Penny Wong expressed support for the protests against the Islamic regime.

On 3 February, the Australian Government updated their sanction list, imposing financial sanctions on 20 individuals and 3 entities from the IRGC who are accused of "oppressing the Iranian people, violently suppressing domestic protests, and threatening lives both inside and outside Iran." The senators media release details the escalation in Iran stating "the regime has massacred thousands of Iranians while attacking and arresting many thousands more for participating in peaceful protest." On 5 February, the Australian Senate also passed a motion condemning the crackdown on protesters.

=== Baloch actors ===
The recently formed People's Fighters Front (PFP), a Baloch nationalist and separatist group, endorsed the protests on 1 January but said that it will not directly intervene in the protests to avoid blame from the Iranian government. However, it also said that it is monitoring the situation and vowed to respond to governmental violence against protesters.

The Balochistan People's Party, a political group in Iran, urged residents at the Sistan and Baluchestan province to join nationwide protests and strikes against the government and act in unity.

=== Canada ===
Canada’s foreign ministry condemned the killing of protesters and the use of violence after a video emerged showing a car running over protesters.

=== China ===
Chinese state media did not report on the protests initially. When covered, protests were depicted as a result of manipulation of "external forces." On 23 January 2026, China voted against a UN Human Rights Council resolution that condemned Iran's crackdown on nationwide protests.

=== European Union ===
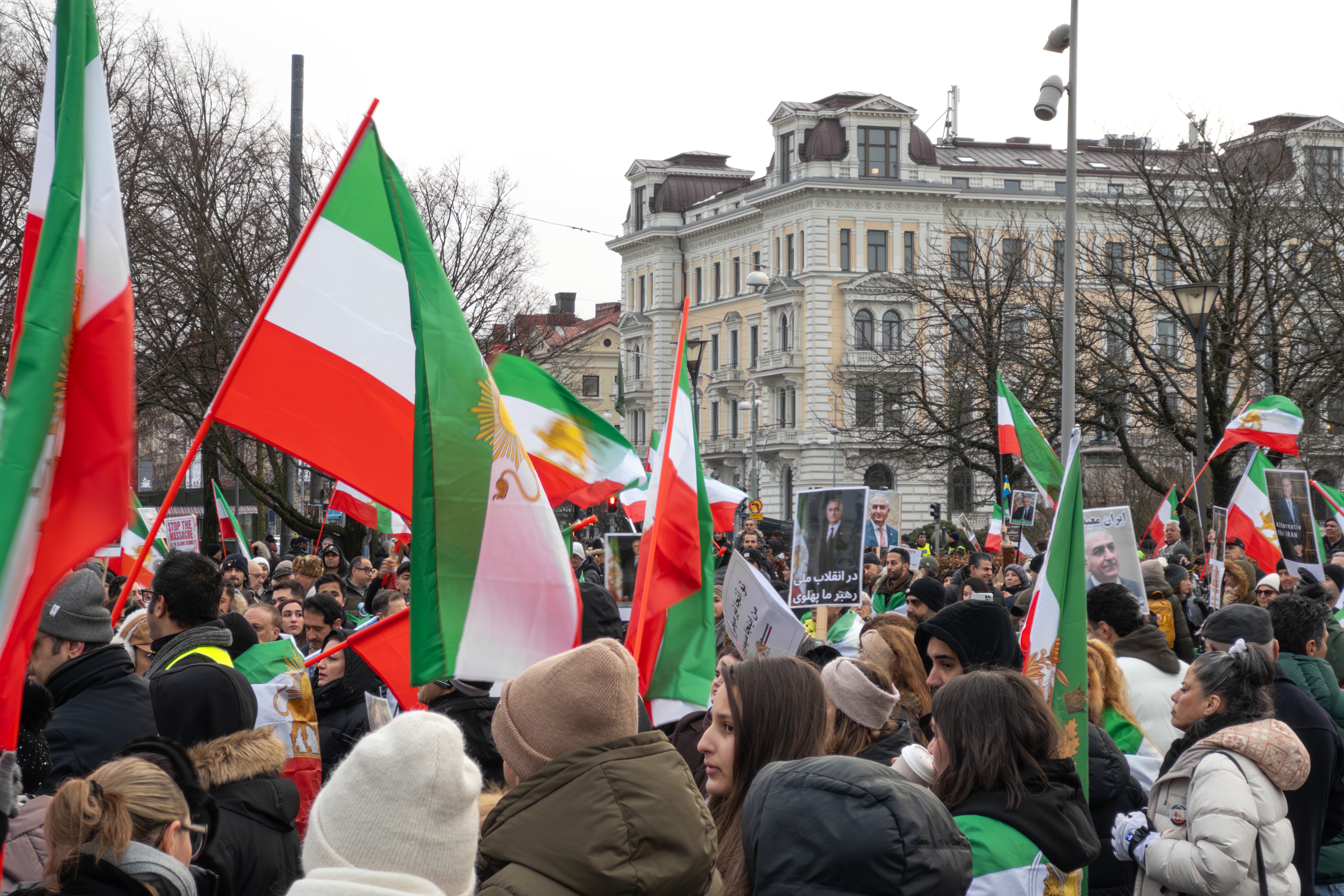
Protest in Gothenburg, Sweden, against the Iranian regime on 17 January 2026

On 3 January, the European External Action Service (EEAS) said the EU was closely following developments across Iran and called on Iranian authorities to uphold rights including freedom of expression, association and peaceful assembly, including ensuring access to information, and to refrain from violence against protesters.

On 9 January, German Chancellor Friedrich Merz, along with French President Emmanuel Macron and British Prime Minister Keir Starmer, issued a joint statement expressing deep concern over the violence perpetrated by Iran's security forces and condemning the killing of protesters. On 13 January, Merz stated that "we are now witnessing the final days and weeks of this regime". He argued, "if a regime can only stay in power through violence, then it is effectively finished." On 29 January, the EU designated the IRGC as a terrorist group as a result for their violent repression.

=== India ===
The Ministry of External Affairs issued an advisory to Indian nationals on 5 January to not travel to Iran during the ongoing protests. The Indian Embassy in Tehran also urged citizens to contact Indian officials and leave the country at the earliest, particularly to Indian students, pilgrims, business persons and tourists visiting or residing in Iran.

=== Israel ===
The national intelligence agency of Israel, Mossad, showed support for the protests, stating "We are with you. Not only from a distance and verbally. We are with you in the field."

Israeli defense officials were on high alert, monitoring the possibility of an Iranian missile attack. Several Israeli politicians expressed support for the protests.

On 4 January 2026, Israeli prime minister Benjamin Netanyahu said Israelis "identify with the struggle of the Iranian people" and suggested it was "quite possible" the protests marked a moment when Iranians were "taking their fate into their own hands".

=== Kurdish actors ===
The Kurdistan Freedom Party (PAK) called on urgent political coordination among Kurdish parties to "articulate a unified political position, and agree on joint Kurdish measures and practical steps that respond to the aspirations of the people and the realities on the ground.”

The Kurdistan Free Life Party (PJAK) issued a public statement expressing support for strikes and demonstrations by merchants and citizens. In its declaration, the organization attributed Iran’s ongoing social and economic crises to long-term state policies of repression, economic mismanagement, and political exclusion.

The Kurdistan Democratic Party of Iran (KDPI) expressed support for public demonstrations and labor actions, citing severe inflation and deteriorating living conditions across the country.

The Komala Party of Iranian Kurdistan, publicly endorsed the protests and strikes by merchants and citizens, describing them as legitimate responses to economic hardship. In its statement, the party held the Iranian government responsible for worsening economic conditions, citing resource misallocation and regional military expenditures.

=== Spain ===
On 9 January, Opposition Leader and leader of the Center-right People's Party Alberto Núñez Feijóo released a statement stating: “The people of Iran are fighting for their freedom, with women at the forefront.” He further emphasized, “Spain must support without ambiguity those who risk their lives to be free. Without silences. Without nuances.”

=== Ukraine ===
Ukraine designated IRGC as foreign terrorist organization group. Ukrainian President Volodymyr Zelenskyy issued a dual Persian and English statement in support of the protests and calling upon the international community to intervene in favor of the protesters. He referred to the protests as an "uprising" and noted how they will hamper Russia, saying, "it is a clear sign that it will not be easier for Russia".

=== United Kingdom ===
In the United Kingdom, members of the Iranian diaspora held a solidarity rally outside 10 Downing Street in London on 3 January 2026, organized by the Association of Anglo-Iranian Women in the UK.

The United Kingdom's Foreign, Commonwealth & Development Office (FCDO) advised against all travel to Iran, warning that the UK government would not be able to evacuate British nationals or provide face-to-face consular assistance in the event of serious unrest or a deterioration in the security situation.

On 10 January 2026, protests were held outside the Iranian Embassy in London, during which a demonstrator climbed the outside of the building and removed the flag from its balcony, replacing it with the Lion and Sun flag. The demonstrator was later arrested for aggravated trespass.

During protests at the Iranian Embassy in London on 16 January, violent clashes ensued resulting in four Metropolitan Police officers being hospitalized and 14 arrests for offences including violent disorder, assault of an emergency worker, criminal damage and trespass on diplomatic premises.

Following the protests, opposition leader and leader of the Conservative party Kemi Badenoch told the BBC that she would "not have an issue" with Iranian regime change and said she supported the involvement of the US and its allies. She claimed that Iran posed a direct threat to the UK, saying it would "very happily wipe out the UK if it felt it could get away with it".

On January 2026, Leader of the right-wing Reform UK party Nigel Farage called on the British government to support the protests in Iran.

=== United Nations ===
On 5 January, United Nations Secretary-General António Guterres urged respect for peaceful protest during the unrest. On 11 January, he released a statement saying he was "shocked by reports of violence and excessive use of force by Iranian authorities against protesters across the country, urging restraint and the immediate restoration of communications." In February, he faced backlash for allegedly congratulating Iranian President Masoud Pezeshkian on the anniversary of the Iranian Revolution. The UN insisted that the letter was simply a matter of protocol and a "routine diplomatic gesture" and should not been seen as an endorsement of policy.

On 23 January, the UN Human Rights Council (UNHRC) adopted a resolution condemning the violent suppression of protests in Iran. Twenty-five states voted in favor of the resolution, including Spain, Italy, Slovenia, Mexico, Colombia, South Korea, and Ghana. Seven states voted against, including China, India, Vietnam, Iraq, Indonesia, and Pakistan. Fourteen states abstained, including Brazil, Qatar, Egypt, South Africa, Kenya, and Thailand.

=== United States ===
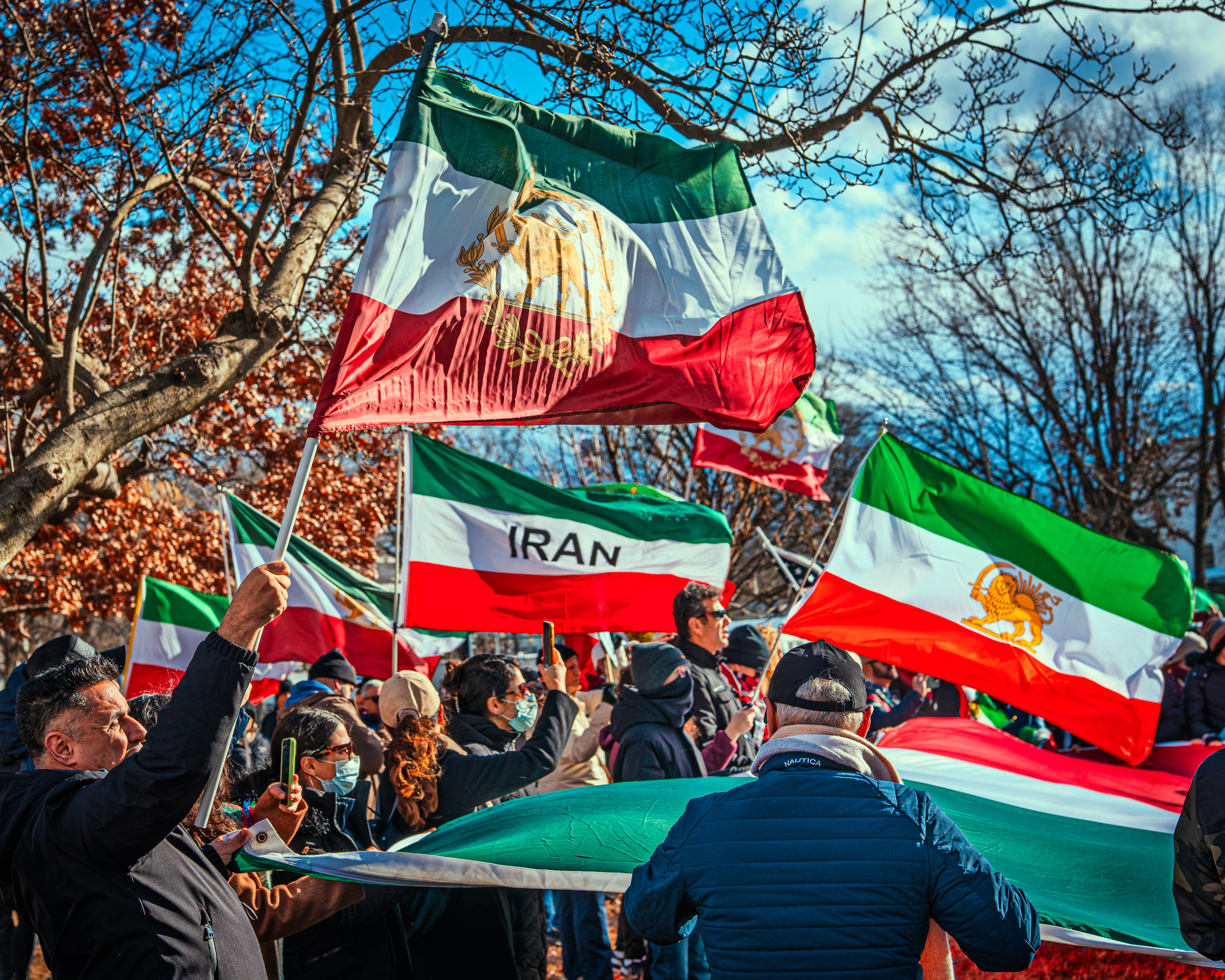
A rally against the Islamic Republic was held in Lafayette Square, Washington, D.C.

The United States Department of State expressed support for the protesters and urged the Iranian government to respect citizens' rights and respond to their concerns instead of resorting to "violent silencing."

U.S. President Donald Trump said that Iran's leadership has "got a lot of problems. They have tremendous inflation. Their economy is bust. And I know that people aren't so happy," also criticizing the government's violent response to protests: "They kill people. Every time they have a riot, or somebody forms a group, little or big, they start shooting people."

U.S. Ambassador to the United Nations Mike Waltz posted on social media, "The people of Iran want freedom. They have suffered at the hands of the ayatollahs for too long. We stand with Iranians in the streets of Tehran and across the country as they protest a radical regime that has brought them nothing but economic downturn and war."

On 2 January, Donald Trump stated that the U.S. would intervene if Iran responded violently to the protests. Trump stated on Truth Social, "If Iran shots [sic] and violently kills peaceful protesters, which is their custom, the United States of America will come to their rescue. We are locked and loaded and ready to go."

On 3 January, after U.S. strikes that lead to the capture of Venezuelan President Nicolás Maduro, Republican senator Lindsey Graham stated on X: "If I were the leader of Iran, I would go pray in the mosque."

On 4 January, President Trump warned that the United States could intervene if Iranian authorities escalated their response to ongoing nationwide protests, saying Iran would be “hit very hard” if security forces continued killing demonstrators. Speaking to reporters aboard Air Force One, Trump said the US was closely monitoring the situation and signaled that further violence against protesters could trigger a strong American response.

On 5 January, the US State Department posted a warning to Iranian leadership on its Persian-language X account stating that "President Trump is a man of action. If you didn’t know before, now you do. Don’t mess with President Trump."

On 6 January, the US State Department addressed the assault on the hospital after the Malekshahi massacre, during which security forces of the Islamic Republic stormed the Imam Khomeini hospital in Ilam where injured protesters were hospitalized. In a post on X it stated that "Storming the wards, beating medical staff and attacking the wounded with tear gas and ammunition is a clear crime against humanity", further adding that "Hospitals are not battlefields. These measures by the Islamic Republic regime are a gross violation of international law and show a complete disregard for human life."

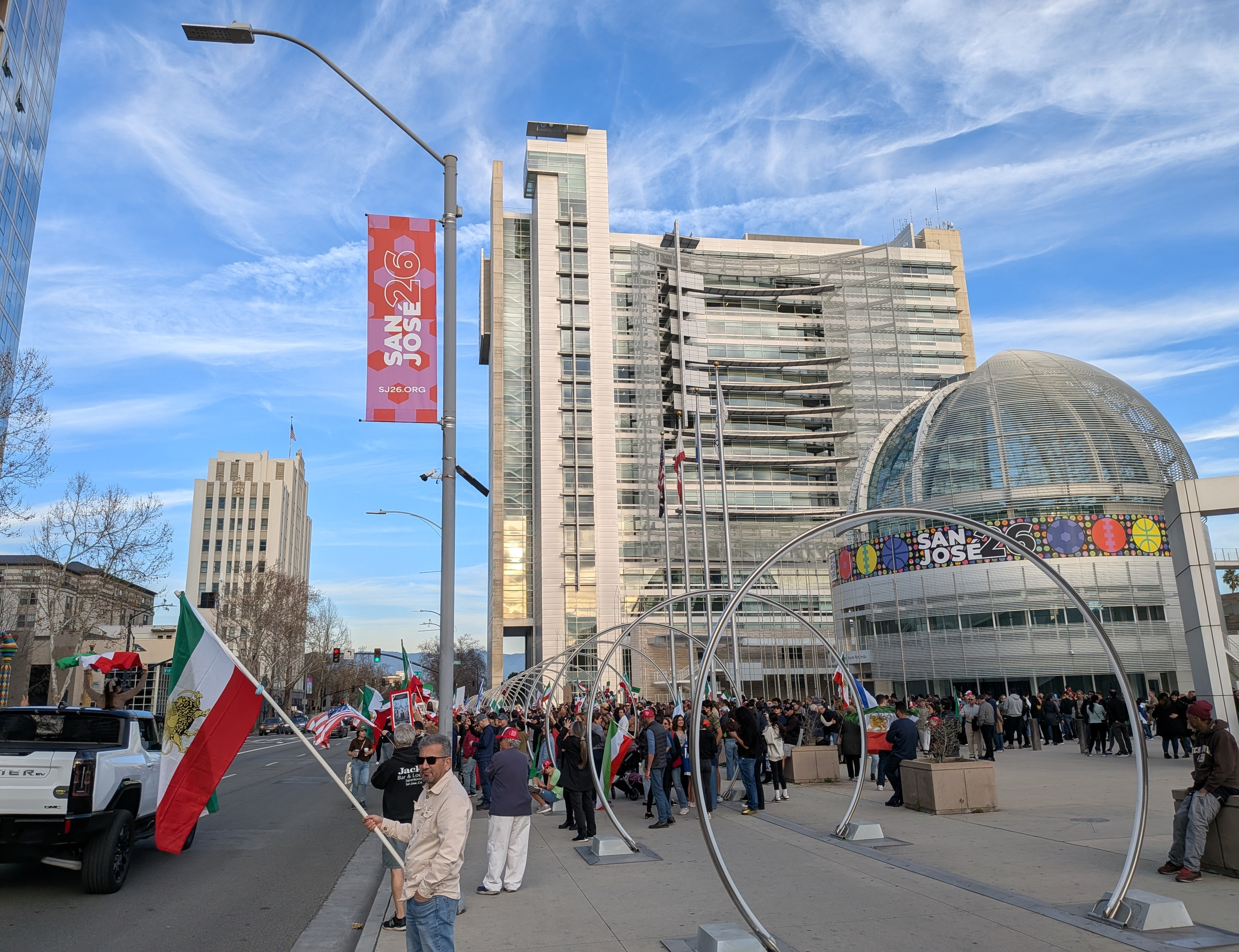
A solidarity rally against the Islamic Republic in San Jose, California, U.S.

On 7 January, in an interview on Fox News, US senator Lindsey Graham issued a warning to Supreme Leader Ali Khamenei, saying, "To the Ayatollahs: you need to understand—if you keep killing your people who are demanding a better life—Donald J. Trump is going to kill you." He added that "change is coming to Iran," calling it biggest shift "in the history of the Mideast to get rid of this Nazi regime." He also referred to the ayatollah as a “modern-day Hitler” addressed Iranian citizens saying "To the people of Iran, help is on the way."

On the same day US Senator Ted Cruz stated that he supported the Iranian protests against the "tyrannical" and "theocratic" regime. He also stated that "the Ayatollah is a zealot. He is a murderer, and I think the regime is fatally weakened as a consequence of losing the war". He further offered his opinion that "the people of Iran want to stand with America," and that "they want to stand with freedom. They want to stand with the West. And tragically, they have suffered under this radical Islamist regime" adding "very few things would produce greater peace in Iran, across the world than seeing the end to this to radical regime."

Laura Loomer, an ally of Trump in the MAGA movement, publicly requested that Trump invite Reza Pahlavi to the White House for a meeting, and that Elon Musk provide Starlink Internet to the Iranian people until Ali Khamenei is overthrown, stating that due to the budget shortage in Tehran, there was an unprecedented opportunity to change the regime.

Additionally, after an anonymous Iranian named a street in Iran after President Trump, the US State Department praised the individual in its Persian language account on X, stating that they "appreciate the action of an anonymous individual in Tehran to name a street after President Trump,“ adding that "the United States respects the voice and aspirations of the Iranian people. We remain committed to supporting their efforts to achieve greater freedom, prosperity, and opportunity.”

U.S. Secretary of State Marco Rubio stated that "The United States supports the brave people of Iran".

On 18 January, US President Donald Trump told Politico "It’s time to look for new leadership in Iran", referring to Khamenei, and said "What he is guilty of, as the leader of a country, is the complete destruction of the country and the use of violence at levels never seen before," adding that "The man is a sick man who should run his country properly and stop killing people," and "His country is the worst place to live anywhere in the world because of poor leadership."

A January Quinnipiac poll found that 70% of Americans oppose U.S. military involvement in Iran, including 79% of Democrats, 80% of independents and 53% of Republicans.

Steve Witkoff, the U.S. Special Envoy to the Middle East, held a meeting with Reza Pahlavi, the exiled former Crown Prince of Iran, at the direction of President Trump. In mid-January 2026, reports emerged that Iranian Foreign Minister Abbas Araghchi sent a personal message to Witkoff stating that Iran had canceled the planned execution of 800 anti-regime protesters. This communication is said to have been instrumental in persuading President Trump to refrain from ordering immediate military strikes against Iran.

Protesters in the United States held placards warning of what they described as a "genocide in the making", drawing comparisons to the Holocaust and denouncing what they called the regime's campaign of "terror".

On 14 February, Trump said that a regime change in Iran would be the "best thing that could happen".

During the 2026 State of the Union address, Trump said that he prefers a diplomatic solution, but he will not allow Iran to get nuclear weapons. He furthermore acknowledged that 32,000 protesters had been killed, and warned that the Iranian government is developing missiles that could eventually reach the US.

=== Reactions by international public figures ===
In January 2026, according to Deadline, a group of 800 professionals of the film industry, including Juliette Binoche, Marion Cotillard, Camille Cottin, Greek director Yorgos Lanthimos and others, released a statement condemning the "killing and torture" of Iranian protesters by the Islamic Republic. The statement decried the fact that "In response to the widespread and peaceful protests of the Iranian people against repression, poverty, discrimination, and structural injustice, the Islamic Republic has chosen not to listen to the voices of its people, but to respond with live ammunition, mass killings, widespread arrests, torture, enforced disappearances, and a nationwide shutdown of the internet," adding that "The deliberate shutdown of the internet and the suppression of media constitute a clear attempt to conceal these crimes and prevent the documentation of truth. These actions represent a blatant and systematic violation of all fundamental human rights, including the right to life, liberty, human dignity, and security, and constitute a clear case of crimes against humanity."

Additionally, the creators called upon "independent international institutions, film festivals, cultural and artistic institutions and the global community of filmmakers and artists" to publicly join the condemnation, "support the struggle" of the Iranian people, and reassess their relationships with the regime.

J.K. Rowling expressed condolences on the death of a Harry Potter fan who was killed during the massacres.

== See also ==
- Abduction of bodies by the Islamic Republic of Iran
