= 62nd Munich Security Conference =

2026 international policy conference

62nd Munich Security Conference Münchner Sicherheitskonferenz
- Nickname: MSC 2026
- Begins: 13 February 2026
- Ends: 15 February 2026
- Venue: Hotel Bayerischer Hof
- Locations: Munich, Germany
- Previous event: 61st (2025)
- Next event: 63rd (2027)

The 62nd Munich Security Conference (German: 62. Münchner Sicherheitskonferenz) was an annual meeting of the Munich Security Conference, took place from 13 to 15 February 2026 in Munich, Germany. The conference focused on major global security challenges in an effort to bring international norms and stability. The event hosted world leaders, addressed ongoing global security crises and geopolitical tensions, as well as technology and cyber threats, instability in governance, and pressures on the international order.

A protest took place around the conference in solidarity with the Iranian people and against the Iranian government.

== Background ==
First held in 1963, The Munich Security Conference became over the decades as a leading forum where senior political, military and diplomatic figures can personally address global security challenges. Key themes in the 62nd MSC included: Middle East security, ongoing strategic competition and erosion of international norms amid heightened global instability, and dialogue between world leaders.

=== Munich Security Report ===
The Munich Security Report (MSR) is published each year ahead of the Munich Security Conference and provides analysis, data, and graphics on current security policy issues. It is prepared with partner institutions and is intended to inform discussions at the conference. The MSR 2026, titled Under Destruction, examined the effects of political movements that seek disruption rather than reform. It linked their rise to dissatisfaction with democratic institutions, declining trust in reform, and perceptions that political systems have become too bureaucratic and legalistic to adapt effectively. The report said that, across the G7 countries surveyed for the Munich Security Index 2026, only a small share of respondents believed their governments' policies would leave future generations better off.

== Participants ==
The 62nd Munich Security Conference is expected to bring together heads of state and government, foreign and defence ministers, and senior representatives of international organizations. As of early 2026, the following leading political figures have been confirmed or publicly reported as invited or expected to attend:

=== Heads of state and government ===
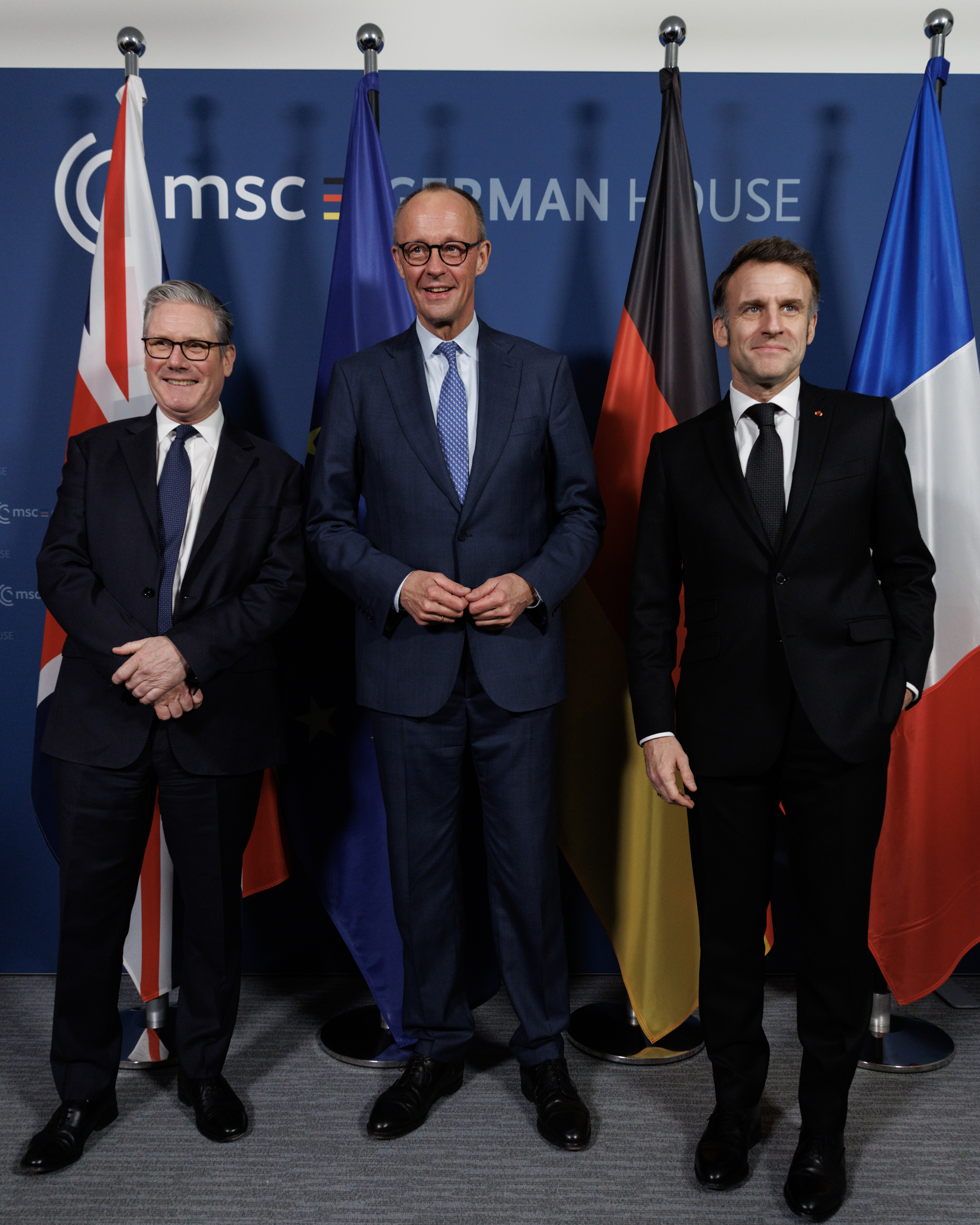
British Prime Minister Keir Starmer, German Chancellor Friedrich Merz, and French President Emmanuel Macron at the Munich Security Conference

- Friedrich Merz – Chancellor of Germany (Host)
- Keir Starmer – Prime Minister of the United Kingdom
- Volodymyr Zelenskyy – President of Ukraine
- Kristen Michal – Prime Minister of Estonia
- Alexander Stubb – President of Finland
- Petr Pavel – President of the Czech Republic
- Emmanuel Macron – President of France
- Gitanas Nausėda – President of Lithuania
- Maia Sandu – President of Moldova
- Pedro Sánchez – Prime Minister of Spain
- Nawaf Salam – Prime Minister of Lebanon
- Evika Silina – Prime Minister of Latvia
- Dick Schoof – Prime Minister of the Netherlands

=== Foreign and defense ministers ===
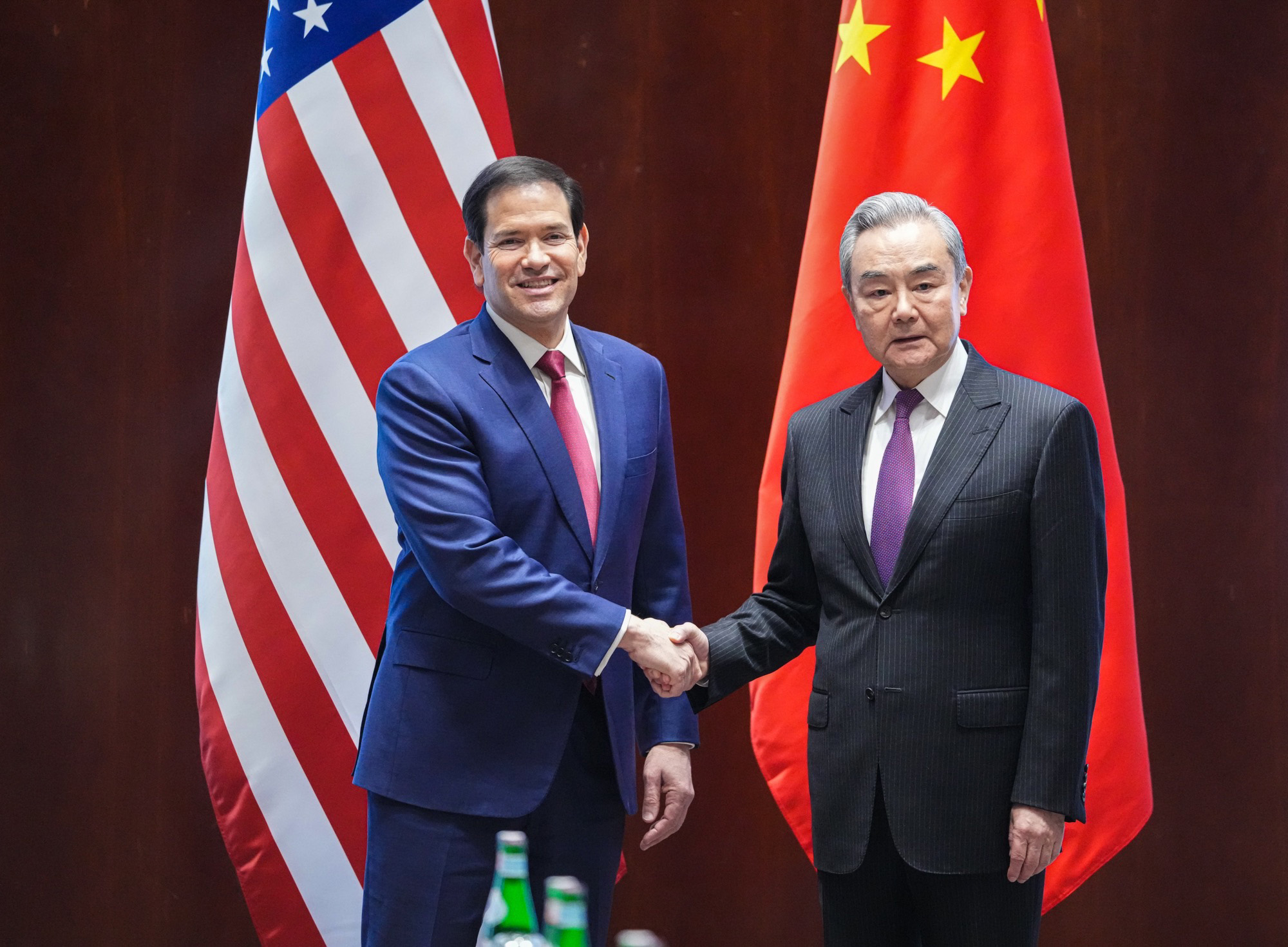
U.S. Secretary of State Marco Rubio met with Director of the CCP Central Foreign Affairs Commission Office and Minister of Foreign Affairs of China Wang Yi at the Munich Security Conference.

- Marco Rubio – United States Secretary of State
- Yvette Cooper – Foreign Secretary of the United Kingdom
- John Healey – Defence Secretary of the United Kingdom
- Subrahmanyam Jaishankar – Minister of External Affairs of the Republic of India
- Anita Anand – Minister of Foreign Affairs of Canada
- Wang Yi – Director of the CCP Central Foreign Affairs Commission Office and Minister of Foreign Affairs of China
- Petr Macinka - Minister of Foreign Affairs of the Czech Republic
- Radosław Sikorski – Minister of Foreign Affairs of Poland
- Baiba Braže – Minister of Foreign Affairs of Latvia
- Tess Lazaro – Secretary of Foreign Affairs of the Philippines
- Asaad al-Shaibani – Ministry of Foreign Affairs and Expatriates of Syria

=== International organizations ===
- Mark Rutte – Secretary General of NATO
- (European Union) Ursula von der Leyen – President of the European Commission
- (European Union) António Costa – President of the European Council
- António Guterres – Secretary-General of the United Nations

=== Other participants ===
- Chris Coons – senior United States Senator from Delaware. He is a member of the Democratic Party
- Ruben Gallego – junior United States Senator from Arizona. He is a member of the Democratic Party
- Mark Kelly – senior United States Senator from Arizona. He is a member of the Democratic Party
- (United States) Alexandria Ocasio-Cortez – U.S. representative for New York's 14th congressional district. She is a member of the Democratic Party
- Jeanne Shaheen – senior United States Senator from New Hampshire. She is a member of the Democratic Party
- Elissa Slotkin – junior United States Senator from Michigan. She is a member of the Democratic Party
- Thom Tillis – senior United States Senator from North Carolina. He is a member of the Republican Party
- Peter Welch – junior United States Senator from Vermont. He is a member of the Democratic Party
- Sheldon Whitehouse – junior United States Senator from Rhode Island. He is a member of the Democratic Party
- (United States) Gretchen Whitmer - Governor of Michigan. She is a member of the Democratic Party
- Roger Wicker – senior United States Senator from Mississippi. He is a member of the Republican Party
- (United States) Gavin Newsom – Governor of California. He is a member of the Democratic Party
- (Syria) Mazloum Abdi – general commander of the Syrian Democratic Forces
- Îlham Ehmed – co-chair of foreign relations office of the Autonomous Administration of North and East Syria
- (Pahlavi Iran) Reza Pahlavi – Iranian exiled crown prince and head of the Pahlavi dynasty
- Paul Grod – President of the Ukrainian World Congress
- Members of national parliaments and senior government officials from Europe, North America, the Middle East, and the Indo-Pacific

== Notable themes and statements ==
=== US-Europe relations ===
With tensions high between Europe and the US over Greenland before the conference, US Secretary of State Marco Rubio stated that the partnership between the two must stay strong, saying that they "belong together" in all security aspects, a message that was met with relief by many European participants.

=== European defence and strategic autonomy ===
The transatlantic alliance had come under increasing strain during the second Trump administration. The issue of European defence and strategic autonomy was addressed by several European leaders like UK Prime Minister Keir Starmer and European Commission President, Ursula von der Leyen, who stated that Europe must reduce its dependency on foreign powers, strengthen its own defense capabilities and be prepared to defend its security and values.

=== Support for Ukraine ===
Throughout the conference, long-term security guarantees were made in support of Ukraine, including references to a U.S. proposal for a 15-year security guarantee. Zelenskyy called on Europe to set a date for Ukraine's acceptance into the EU and to not take a half-baked peace deal.

=== Instability in Iran ===
Ukraine's president Zelenskyy stated that the situation in Iran “must be stopped immediately”, addressing also the continuing supply of drones from Iran to Russia.

== Controversies ==
The invitation list for MSC 2026 has attracted attention and debate. Initially, Iranian Foreign Minister Abbas Araqchi and his deputy were reported to have been invited, though separate reporting indicates that the conference later withdrew some invitations to Iranian officials in response to domestic protests and violent response by the government of Iran. Instead, former Iranian crown prince Reza Pahlavi was invited to the conference, who called on the United States to intervene in Iran and "end the Islamic Republic".

Alexandria Ocasio-Cortez's performance at the conference, which included her inaccurately describing Venezuela as being located "below the equator" and stumbling on U.S. foreign policy and diplomacy issues like those concerning Taiwan, drew criticism, as well as deep questioning of the knowledge that Ocasio-Cortez, who is considered to be a potential U.S. presidential candidate, had regarding foreign policy.

== Protests ==
A protest took place around the conference in solidarity with the Iranian people and against the Iranian government. Other protests were against war, extremism, and public health policies. On Saturday 14 February 2026, a demonstration of people in support of the people of Iran and against the Iranian government, took place in Munich.

== See also ==
- 61st Munich Security Conference
- Global day of action for the Iranian people
- 2026 Iranian diaspora protests
