= Gissou Nia =

Human rights lawyer

- Occupation: Human rights lawyer

Gissou Nia is an American-Iranian human rights lawyer and senior fellow at the Atlantic Council, where she serves as director of the Strategic Litigation Project, which focuses on accountability and prevention for human rights violations, terrorism, atrocities, and corruption.

In a 2018 interview, Nia said she was born in the United States and described herself as Iranian and Iranian-American. She is a law school graduate.

Nia began her career at The Hague, where she worked to prosecute war crimes and crimes against humanity at the International Criminal Tribunal for the former Yugoslavia and the International Criminal Court.

She serves as board chair of the Iran Human Rights Documentation Center where she aims to promote accountability, human rights and the rule of law in Iran. Since the murder of Mahsa Amini in September 2022, Nia has pursued efforts to hold the Islamic Republic accountable, leading a successful campaign to have Iran removed from the UN Commission on the Status of Women.

Since March 2023, Nia has been a founding member and legal advisor to the End Gender Apartheid campaign, an effort to codify the crime of gender apartheid under international law.

In 2026, Nia said the 2025-2026 Iranian protests are motivated by the Iranian people's desire for regime change.
