= List of lawsuits involving X Corp. =

X Corp. is an American technology company created by Elon Musk on March 9, 2023. In an April 4, 2023, court filing, Twitter, Inc. disclosed that it no longer existed and was consolidated into X Corp.

== Ongoing ==
=== Defamation and conspiracy cases in Canada by Masood Masjoody ===
In January 2024, self-representing litigant and exiled Iranian mathematician Masood Masjoody commenced two related civil actions in the Supreme Court of British Columbia (BCSC) against X Corp., Reza Pahlavi, several Iranian-Canadian individuals, and multiple John Doe defendants who were identified only by their X (formerly Twitter) social media accounts. The lawsuits allege defamation, conspiracy, coordinated digital harassment, incitement, and death threats, allegedly carried out by actors commonly affiliated with both the Islamic Republic of Iran and supporters of Reza Pahlavi.

X Corp. was sued not merely as a platform, but as a "publisher" and a "participant or facilitator in the alleged conspiracy". The plaintiff argued that X Corp. played a direct role in the publication and amplification of defamatory and harmful content.

On June 27, 2024, the Court granted an order for substituted service on the John Doe defendants, permitting service via advertisement on the X social platform. In August 2024, the BCSC issued a broad injunction against several John Doe defendants, requiring them to remove defamatory content and prohibiting them from publishing any further material concerning Masjoody. The injunction followed findings that those defendants had failed to respond and were in default. In September 2024, the Court further ordered the John Doe defendants to identify themselves. As of March 2025, they had not complied with the identification order, and remained in breach of the Court's order.

X Corp. applied to dismiss or, alternatively, stay both actions under a forum selection clause in its terms of service, which designates California as the forum for disputes. On May 21, 2024, the BCSC dismissed the application, holding that the plaintiff's claims—including allegations of direct defamation and conspiracy—fell outside the scope of the clause and raised serious issues about X Corp.'s alleged active role in the harmful conduct.

X Corp. appealed. On March 25, 2025, the British Columbia Court of Appeal (BCCA) dismissed the appeal in a landmark decision: X Corp. v. Masjoody, 2025 BCCA 89. The Court found that enforcing the clause was inappropriate where the allegations involved more than a standard user-platform relationship and included claims of direct involvement in defamation, incitement, and coordinated online attacks. The Court allowed the lawsuits to proceed in British Columbia and awarded costs to Masjoody.

As of March 2025, both actions—Masjoody v. X Corp., Reza Pahlavi et al. and Masjoody v. X Corp., Momeni—were ongoing before the Supreme Court of British Columbia.

Masjoody was murdered on March 6, 2026. A police spokesperson described his murder as having "impacted the Iranian community [and] generated widespread concern and public interest" and that the two people accused of the murder had had "some ongoing disputes ... as well as some exchanges on social media". Iranian-Canadian human rights activist Nazanin Afshin-Jam said that Masjoody had been threatened in relation to his attempts to reveal the presence of people in Canada connected with the Iranian Islamic Revolutionary Guard Corps. Two suspects, both supporters of Reza Pahlavi according to The Atlantic, were arrested and charged with first-degree murder.

=== Copyright infringement case ===
In June 2023, the National Music Publishers' Association, on behalf of Universal Music Group, Concord Music Group, Sony Music Publishing, Warner Chappell Music, and other major publishers, sued X Corp. for about US$250 million in damages over alleged copyright infringement on about 1,700 songs.

In March 2024, a US district judge upheld parts of the lawsuit against X Corp. while dismissing most of the claims, including that of "direct and vicarious copyright infringement" as well as the "publishers' contributory infringement".

=== Facilitate Corp case ===
In June 2023, Australian management firm Facilitate Corp sued X Corp. for alleged unpaid bills related to work done in four countries. The firm seeks about A$1 million (US$673 thousand) in damages.

=== Boulder landlord case ===
In June 2023, X Corp. countersued its Boulder landlord over a US$5.8m alleged wrongfully denied tenant-improvement allowance. At the time, X Corp. faced eviction from its Boulder office.

=== French newspaper copyright cases ===
In August 2023, French leading news agency AFP sued X Corp. for failing to compensate it for distributing its original content, citing the "neighboring rights" under the newly adopted EU copyright reforms. In May 2024, an interim relief Paris judicial court ordered X Corp. to provide "precise data" regarding its consumption of AFP's content. A penalty of 2,000 Euro per day of delay was also included in the court order. AFP claims that X Corp. failed to comply with the order and requested a penalty payment of 266,000 euros.

In November 2024, French newspapers Les Echos, Le Parisien, Groupe Le Monde and Le Figaro jointly sued X Corp. for failing to compensate as well.

In February 2025, Les Echos and Le Parisien (both owned by LVMH) dropped the lawsuit without providing further details.

=== Atlas case ===
In September 2023, X Corp. sued financial service company Atlas Exploration, alleging breach of contract. Both companies entered a sublease agreement for space at 650 California Street in San Francisco in April 2021, but X Corp. alleges that Atlas terminated the agreement early. X Corp. seeks more than US$713,500 in rent and other fees stemming from the agreement.

=== Severance pay of Twitter executives ===
Four former Twitter executives, including CEO Parag Agrawal, Chief Financial Officer Ned Segal, head of legal Vijaya Gadde and General Counsel Sean Edgett, sued Elon Musk and X Corp. for US$128 million in unpaid severance in March 2024. In the filing, the plaintiffs alleged that Musk had acted in revenge against them personally. A district judge refused to dismiss the case on November 1, 2024.

In August 2024, Omid Kordestani, former executive chairman of Twitter, filed a lawsuit against X Corp. in California Superior Court. Kordestani alleges that Elon Musk is refusing to cash out more than $20 million worth of shares owed to him as compensation for his service.

In November 2024, former Twitter chief marketing officer Leslie Berland joined the group of executives in their bid to claim unpaid severance. Berland claims that she was "wrongly denied about $20 million in severance after Musk fired her based on a disagreement connected to former president Donald Trump's Twitter account".

=== Media Matters case ===
In November 2023, X Corp. sued nonprofit watchdog journalism organization Media Matters for America for "allegedly disparaging the company and harming its relationships with advertisers".

In December 2023, Ireland-based X Corp. subsidiary Twitter International Limited Company also sued Media Matters in an Irish court.

In August 2024, a Texas federal district judge ruled that X Corp. could pursue federal claims against Media Matters.

In February 2025, Singapore-based X Corp. subsidiary Twitter Asia Pacific (TAP) sued Media Matters for defamation and malicious falsehood in a Singapore court.

In March 2025, Media Matters countersued X Corp, accusing the latter of "abusive" tactics.

=== Sterling Computers Corp. case ===
In May 2024, Sterling Computers Corp. sued Meta Platforms and X Corp. over patent infringement allegations concerning the social media platforms' methods for "filtering posts and messages with algorithm and ranking systems".

=== Imane Khelif case ===
In August 2024, Algerian boxer and Olympian champion Imane Khelif sued X Corp., citing "cyberbullying". The lawsuit was filed in France.

=== Advertisers antitrust case ===
In August 2024, X Corp. sued the food giants Unilever and Mars Inc., private healthcare company CVS Health, and renewable energy firm Ørsted, along with trade association World Federation of Advertisers (WFA), for allegedly conspiring to withhold "billions of dollars" in advertising revenue. WFA-subsidiary Global Alliance for Responsible Media (GARM) was also named in the lawsuit resulting in its shutdown while all efforts were put in a defense in court.

Days later, US district judge O'Connor recused himself from the case without providing an explanation. The case was reassigned to Judge Kinkeade. An NPR report noted judge O'Connor's investment in Elon Musk's company Tesla, Inc. Judge Kinkeade also recused herself in December without explanation.

In October 2024, X Corp. dropped Unilever from its lawsuit after a settlement agreement was announced. Unilever subsequently re-established its X social media account.

Between November 2024 and February 2025, X Corp. added several companies to the list of companies facing boycott allegations, namely Twitch in November 2024 and Nestlé, Abbott Laboratories, Colgate-Palmolive, Lego, Pinterest, Tyson Foods and Shell in February 2025.

=== Wiwynn case ===
In August 2024, Taiwanese tech firm Wiwynn sued X Corp. over US$120 million worth of alleged unpaid IT bills. The firm seeks damages worth US$61 million, "having been able to cancel or recoup about US$59 million worth of the components". The firm added two new counts to the lawsuit in October 2024: intentional misrepresentation and negligent misrepresentation.

=== Don Lemon case ===
In August 2024, Don Lemon sued Elon Musk and X Corp. over the cancellation of a US$1.5 million talk show deal. The ex-CNN talk show host was also promised a share of advertising revenue. The lawsuit alleges fraud, negligent misrepresentation, and misappropriation of name and likeness. In September 2024, Musk sought to dismiss the case through federal court, claiming he did nothing wrong.

Musk tried to move the case to Texas federal court, but a federal judge returned it to state court in December 2024, ruling that Musk improperly invoked federal jurisdiction.

=== California's content moderation law case: Bill 587 ===
In September 2023, X Corp. sued the state of California over a content moderation law "requiring them to publish their policies for policing disinformation, harassment, hate speech and extremism." The lawsuit is focused on Assembly Bill 587. The State prevailed at a late 2023 hearing on a preliminary injunction requested by X Corp., but in September 2024, X Corp. won its appeal to block a part of the law. However, the case was remanded for further analysis by the district court.

In February 2025, the parties reached a legal agreement. The state conceded that that one of its social media laws violated the First Amendment. California also agreed to pay X Corp. almost $350,000 in attorneys' fees. The State's Attorney General's spokesperson said that "the California Department of Justice is committed to enforcing California law, including the remaining requirements of AB 587."

The case was moved before U.S. District Judge William Shubb for a final judgement.

=== California's content moderation law case: Bill 2655 ===
In November 2024, X Corp. sued California's attorney general and secretary of state over "Assembly Bill 2655" (Defending Democracy from Deepfake Deception Act of 2024), a law requiring it to police "deceptive content about elections". X Corp argues that the law will lead to "censorship of political speech and commentary".

=== Reporters Without Borders case ===
In November 2024, French nonprofit organization Reporters Without Borders sued X Corp. in a French court claiming "X's refusal to remove content that it knows is false and deceitful — as it was duly informed by RSF — makes it complicit in the spread of the disinformation circulating on its platform".

=== German non-profits case ===
In February 2025, two German nonprofit organizations sued X Corp. in the Berlin regional court, alleging a breach of EU rules by not providing data to study how posts on the platform could influence the 2025 German federal election. Less than 72 hours later, the court ruled in favor of the plaintiffs and ordered X Corp. to grant "unrestricted access to all publicly available data" before and shortly after the elections.

X Corp. filed an appeal and a motion to dismiss three judges overseeing the case. One judge was subsequently removed from the case. The motion to dismiss the other judges was denied.

== Resolved ==
=== RICO case ===
In May 2022, political activist Laura Loomer sued Meta Inc. and Twitter, alleging that both companies conspired with the government to "censor conservative voices". She sought US$10 billion in punitive damages and an end to online hate speech.

In October 2023, a federal judge dismissed the lawsuit with prejudice.

=== FTC case ===
In November 2023, a federal district judge dismissed a case brought by X Corp. to "end or modify" a consent order between the platform and the US Federal Trade Commission over X Corp.'s handling of user's information. The judge also denied X Corp's bid to end an FTC deposition of Elon Musk.

=== Surveillance disclosures case ===
In 2014, Twitter sued the government to publicly release a report about the exact number of times the government served it with national-security orders, after the Federal Bureau of Investigation concluded that report to be classified. The lawsuit was rejected by a trial judge and the 9th US Circuit Court of Appeals upheld that ruling in March 2023. In January 2024, the Supreme Court declined to hear X Corp's appeal, effectively ending X Corp's case against the government.

=== San Francisco landlord case ===
In March 2024, San Francisco-based landlord SRI Nine Market Square dismissed its case against X Corp. over alleged nonpayment of US$13.6m in rent. The lawsuit was filed in January 2023.

=== CCDH defamation case ===
In May 2024, a federal judge dismissed X Corp.'s lawsuit against the Center for Countering Digital Hate, citing a California law against strategic lawsuits against public participation. X Corp. sought "at least tens of millions of dollars" in damages.

=== Bright Data case ===
In May 2024, a federal judge dismissed X Corp.'s US$1 million lawsuit against Israeli technology company Bright Data for alleged data scraping. The judge emphasized that social media companies shouldn't have complete control over how public data is used, as this could lead to "information monopolies that would disserve the public interest".

=== Severance pay of Twitter staff ===
In July 2024, a district judge dismissed a case brought by former Twitter staff, who accused Musk of "unlawfully denying roughly US$500m in severance payments owed to workers fired after his takeover of the company." At least one former employee was awarded unpaid severance in September in a closed-door arbitration.

=== X Corp. shareholders case ===
In August 2024, a federal US district judge granted a motion Washington Post journalist Jacob Silverman filed to unseal a document pertaining to X Corp.'s shareholders. The judge ruled that X Corp. "did not show good cause" to keep the document hidden from the public.

=== EU User data case ===
In August 2024, nine EU countries (Austria, Belgium, Spain, France, Greece, Italy, the Netherlands, and Poland) sued X Corp. for allegedly using user data without consent to train its generative AI, Grok. The Irish Data Protection Commission (DPC) alleges X Corp. processed personal data from May 7 to Aug. 1, 2024, affecting around 60 million EU users. X Corp. risks fines of up to 4% of its global annual revenue.

In September 2024, X Corp. suspended its use of data of EU citizens to train Grok. It also deleted data collected between May 7 and August 1, 2024.

=== Australia Online Safety Act case ===
In October 2024, a federal judge dismissed X Corp's case against Australia's eSafety Commissioner's fine for "allegedly failing to respond to questions about harmful content on its platform, particularly child sexual abuse material". The US$610,500 penalty was issued to Twitter in October 2023 under the Online Safety Act. X Corp was ordered to pay the fine and the Commissioner's court costs.

=== Trump nondisclosure order case ===
X Corp. unsuccessfully appealed a government nondisclosure order pertaining to an investigation into Donald Trump's efforts to overturn the 2020 elections. X Corp. was fined US$350,500 in penalties for missing a judge's deadline to comply with the order, which X Corp. later paid. A federal appeals court rejected X Corp.'s objections and the US Supreme Court rejected to hear the case in October 2024, effectively ending X Corp.'s case against the government.

=== Adeia case ===
In November 2024, X Corp. and technology licensing company Adeaia Inc (ADEA.O) settled a lawsuit involving digital-media patents. X Corp. sued Adeia Inc in a California federal court in November 2023.

=== Trump J6 Twitter case ===
In February 2025, X Corp. settled with Donald Trump over his January 6 Twitter account suspension. The company has agreed to pay Trump about US$10 million.

=== X trademark case: Multiply ===
In July 2024, PR Firm Multiply sued X Corp. for allegedly stealing their established identity, citing "consumer confusion by using the "X" trademark for social-media marketing services that compete with Multiply".

In February 2025, a settlement agreement was announced without providing further details. Multiply's CEO Dan Baum said that the dispute had been "amicably resolved".

=== X trademark case: X Social Media ===
In October 2023, marketing agency X Social Media filed a lawsuit against X Corp. alleging a violation of its trademark of the letter "X". In July 2024, a federal US District judge allowed three of X Social Media's claims against X Corp. to proceed. The judge agreed with the claim that the trademark "X SOCIALMEDIA" was "incontestable".

On 15 September 2025, X Corp settled with X Social Media as both companies asked a Florida federal court to "dismiss the case with prejudice". X Social Media will change its name to "Mass Tort Ad Agency" without providing settlement terms.

== See also ==
- List of lawsuits involving Tesla, Inc.
