= 2025–2026 Iranian protests =

Anti-government protests

- Part of Gen Z protests in Asia, the Iranian economic crisis, the Middle Eastern crisis, the 2025–2026 Iran internal crisis, and prelude to the 2026 Iran war
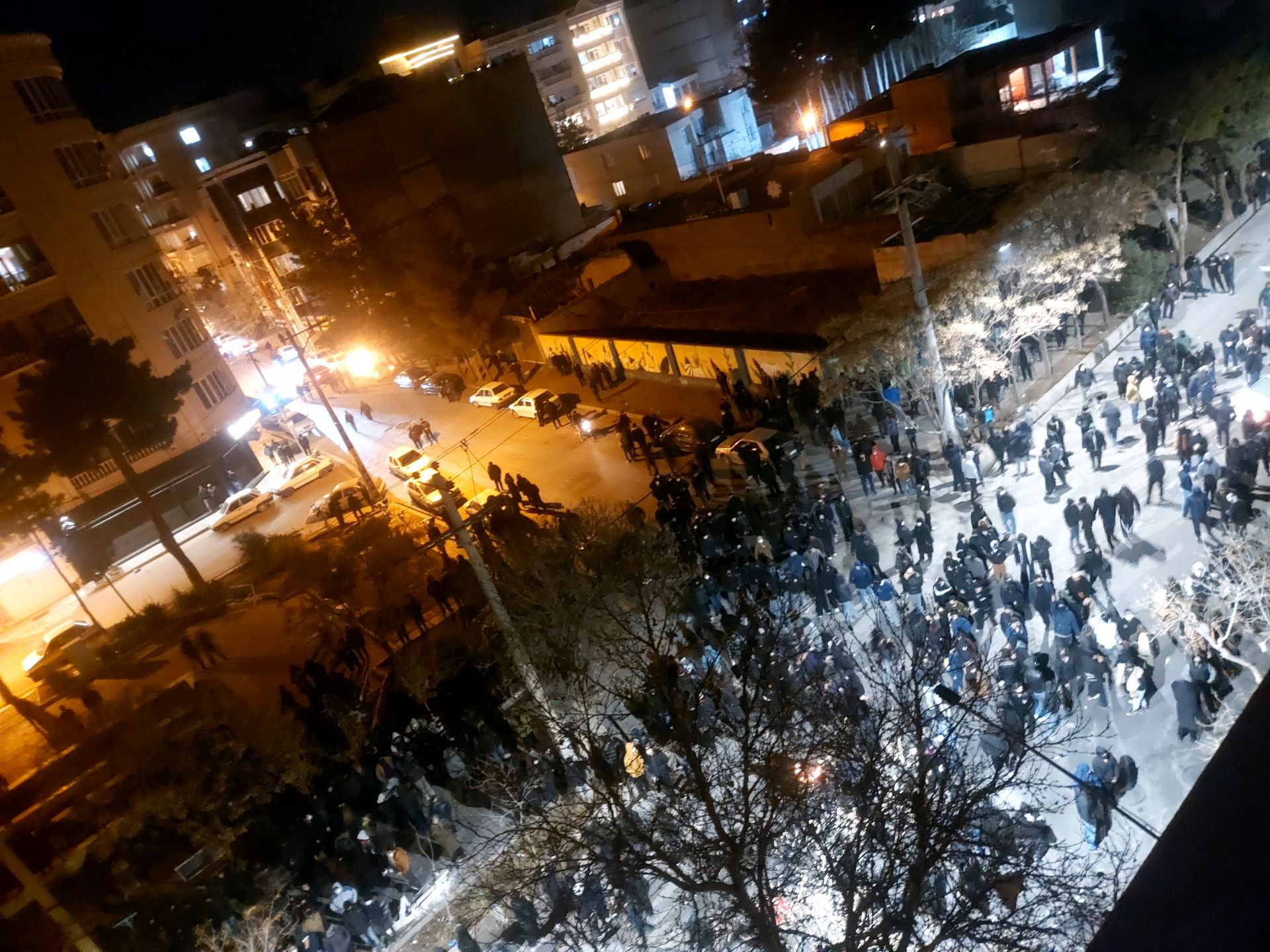
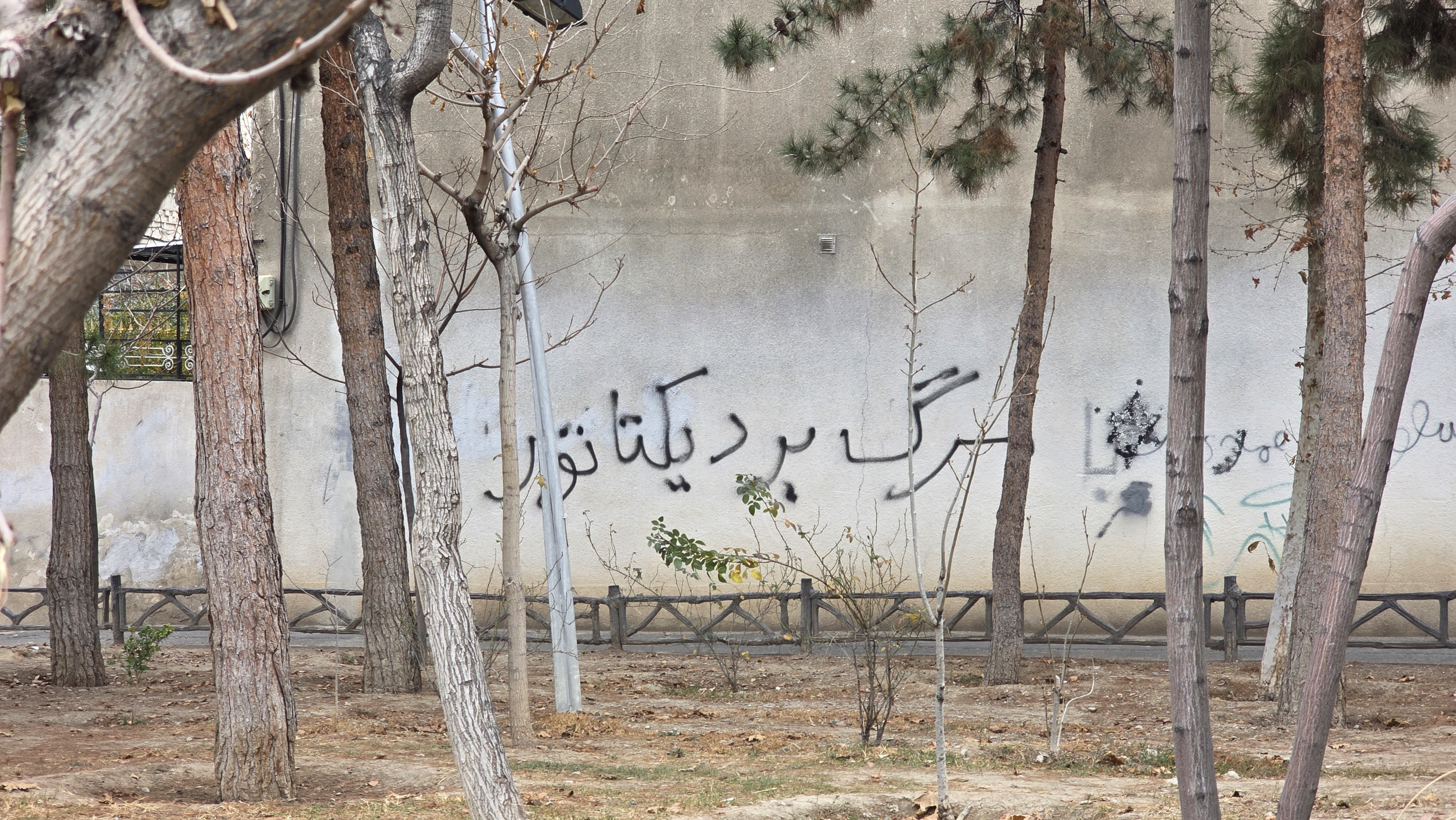
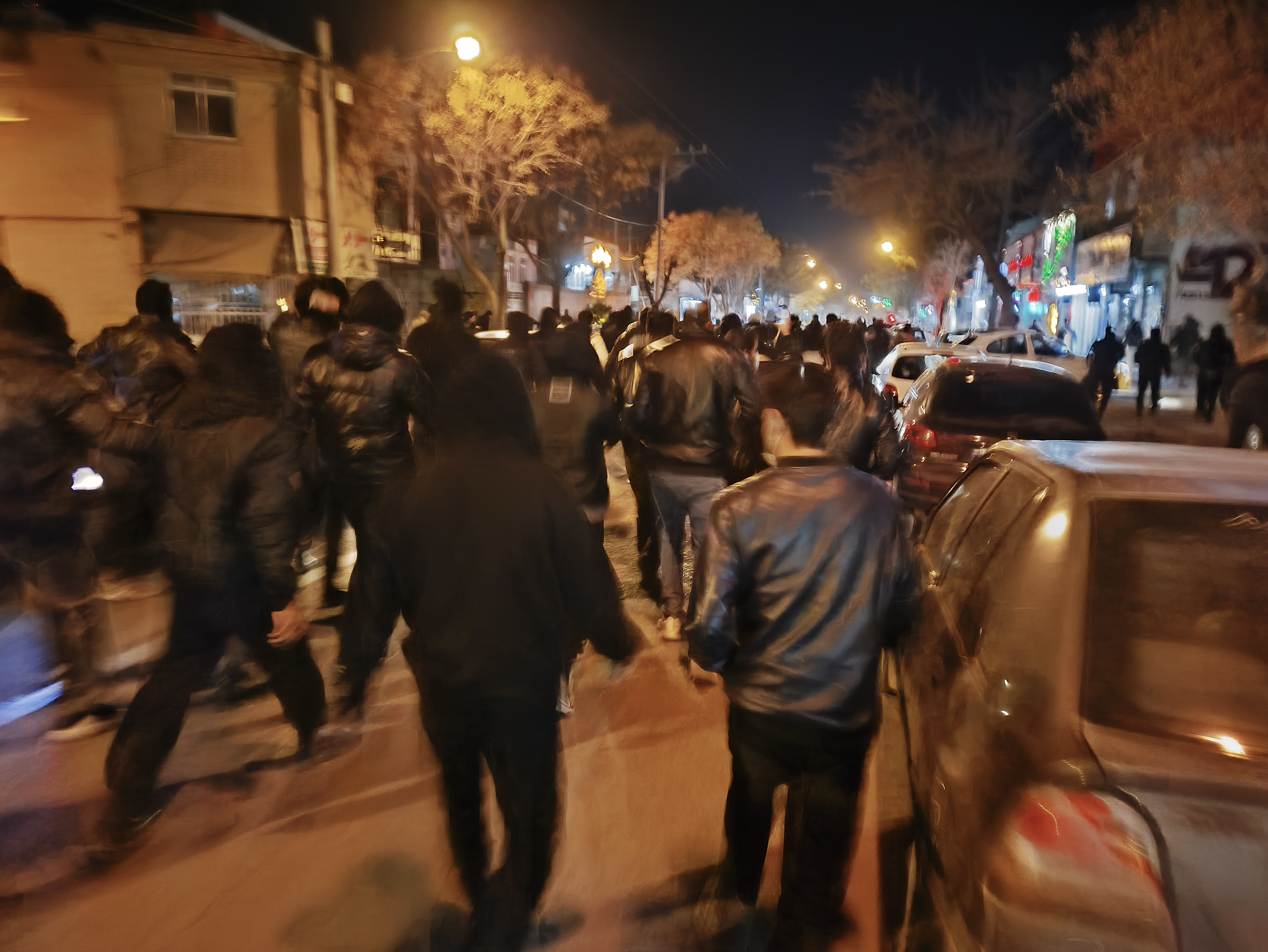
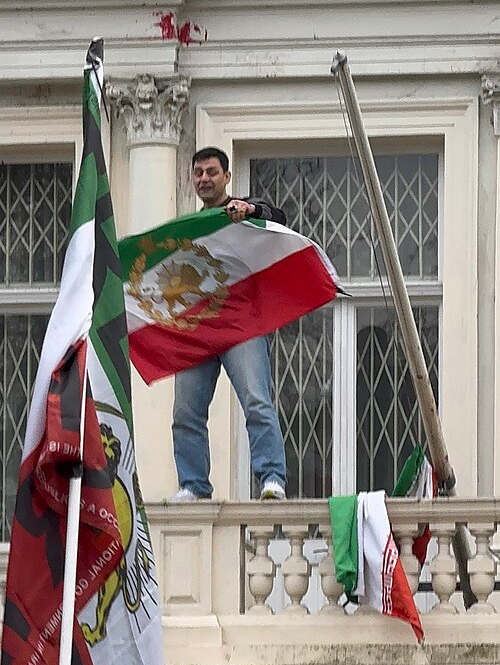
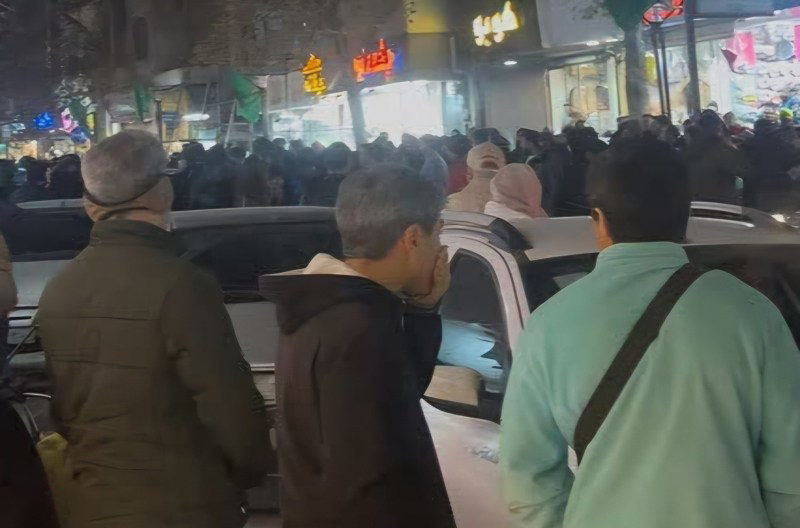
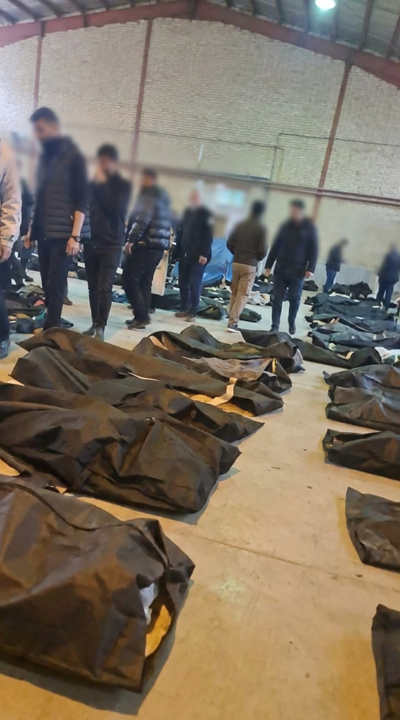
- Top to bottom, left to right: Protests in Neyshabur; Graffiti writing 'Death to the Dictator'; Protests in Kashmar; Protester replacing the flag of Iran with the Lion and Sun flag at the Iranian Embassy in London; Protests in Qazvin; Body bags of victims of the massacres.
- Date: 28 December 2025 – present (10 months and 23 days); Phase I: 28 December 2025 – 16 January 2026 (19 days); Phase II: 21 February 2026 – 31 March 2026 (1 month and 10 days); Phase III: 17 November 2026 - present (3 days)
- Location: 675 locations across 210 cities in all 31 provinces of Iran
- Caused by: Economic issues: Economic mismanagement, international sanctions, rising prices, currency crisis – depreciation of the Iranian rial, water and energy shortages; Political issues: Authoritarianism, human rights abuses, political corruption, Internet censorship and blackouts; Systemic/ideological issues: Foreign proxy involvement, mandatory hijab enforcement, ethnic-based discrimination, religious persecution
- Goals: Overthrow of the Islamic Republic government; Return of Reza Pahlavi to lead a transitional government; End of economic mismanagement
- Methods: Street protests, marches, arsons, and rooftop demonstrations, chants and slogans, strikes and shop closures, online activism, student activism, riots, rebellion, insurgency
- Status: Protests violently suppressed by security forces; Nationwide internet and mobile network shutdown; Central Bank governor resigns; protests grow in size while authorities continue arrests and killings of protesters; 2026 Kurdish–Iranian crisis; Protests mostly quelled by 16 January 2026 while internal minor protests continue; Iranian authorities announce that the protests had been suppressed following a severe crackdown, claiming that the unrest had ended; 2026 Iran–United States crisis; U.S. military buildup in the Persian Gulf region, and renewed negotiations; 2026 Iran war; Protests reignite on 21 February

Parties
Iranian opposition; Anti-government demonstrators; Student demonstrators; Police and military defectors; Armed civilians; Political groups: Iran National Council (INC); Mojahedin-e-Khalq (MEK); National Council of Resistance of Iran (NCRI); Solidarity for a Secular Democratic Republic in Iran; Separatist groups: Kurdish groups; Democratic Party of Iranian Kurdistan; Kurdistan Freedom Party; Kurdistan Free Life Party; Xebat; Komalah; Revolutionary Toilers Association; Kurdistan Toilers Association; Kurdistan National Guard; Zagros Tornado units; Baloch separatists; People's Fighters Front; Balochistan People's Party; Azerbaijani separatists; South Azerbaijan Organisations Cooperation Council; Coordination Council of Azerbaijani Parties in Iran; Arab separatists; Coordinating Council of Ahwazi Organizations; Labour, civil, and retiree groups: Free Workers Union of Iran; Iranian Writers Association; Coordination Council of Iranian Teachers Trade Associations; Haft Tappeh Sugarcane Workers Syndicate; Coordination Committee to Help Form Independent Labour Organisations; Khuzestan Retired Workers; Union of Retirees Group; Kurdish Women's Organisations; Retirees Union; Kermanshah Electricity and Metal Association; "Stop Executions"; "Justice Seekers"; Coordination Council for Protests of Contract Oil Workers; Coordination Council for Protests of Non-Formal Oil Workers; Coordination Council of Nurses Protests; "Neday-e Zanan-e Iran"; World Iranian Christian Alliance; Supported by: United States; Israel	Government of Iran Iranian Armed Forces: Islamic Republic of Iran Armed Forces; Police Command; Islamic Revolutionary Guard Corps; Ground Forces; Basij; Nabi Akram Corps; Pro-government counterprotesters and plainclothesmen Pro-government foreign militias: Popular Mobilization Forces; Kata'ib Hezbollah; Harakat al-Nujaba; Kata'ib Sayyid ul-Shuhada; Badr Organisation; Hezbollah; Liwa Fatemiyoun; Liwa Zainebiyoun; Nakhsa

Lead figures
No centralised leadership; (Iranian opposition) Reza Pahlavi (in exile)	Ali Khamenei X; Mojtaba Khamenei (WIA); Masoud Pezeshkian; Others: Gholam-Hossein Mohseni-Eje'i; Mohammad Bagher Ghalibaf; Ali Larijani X; Abbas Araghchi; Amir Hatami; Ahmad-Reza Radan; Abdolrahim Mousavi X; Mohammad Pakpour X; Ahmad Vahidi; Gholamreza Soleimani X

Number
At least 5 million (per Iran International)	800,000–900,000 Iranian internal security apparatus (Basij personnel, policemen, IRGC Ground Forces); 5,000 Iran-backed Iraqi militiamen; 10,000–500,000 counter-protesters in Tehran

Casualties
- Deaths: 7,015-43,000+ (Note: 7,015–18,759 per HRANA, including 6,508 protesters, 214 government-affiliated individuals (military and non-military), 67 non-protesting civilians and 226 minors confirmed killed, while an additional 11,744 reported deaths are under review.)
- Injuries: 330,000–360,000 (Note: 330,000–360,000 per The Sunday Times, Over 350,000 protesters, including over 10,000 blinded, similar to the 2022 protests per International Centre for Human Rights.)
- Arrested: 53,552
- See casualties for details. Precise casualties uncertain partly due to telecommunications blackout from 8 January to 26 May 2026.

The 2025–2026 Iranian protests (Note: Also known as the Lion and Sun Revolution (Persian: انقلاب شیر و خورشید, romanized: Enqelâb‑e Šir o Xoršid), the National Revolution of Iran (Persian: انقلاب ملی ایران, romanized: Enqelâb‑e Melli‑ye Irân), and the 1404 Iranian uprising (Persian: خیزش ۱۴۰۴ ایران, romanized: Xizeš‑e 1404 Irân).) are a series of nationwide demonstrations against the government of Iran that began on 28 December 2025 amid a deepening economic crisis. The unrest followed a sharp depreciation of the Iranian rial, rising inflation, and widespread shortages linked to international sanctions and government mismanagement. This event has been the largest uprising in Iran since the 1979 Islamic Revolution, (Note: Attributed to multiple sources:) spreading to more than 200 cities across the country. The ensuing crackdown, reportedly carried out under orders by Ali Khamenei and senior officials to use live fire on protesters, resulted in massacres that left thousands of protesters dead.

Initially sparked by frustration over record-high inflation, food prices, and currency depreciation, the protests quickly evolved into a broader movement demanding an end to the Islamic government. Beginning with the bazaari (shopkeepers and merchants) in Tehran's Grand Bazaar and later university students, the demonstrations soon spread to other major cities and small settlements. Protesters chanted anti-government slogans.

Although largely leaderless, the protests escalated on 8 January following a call for unified protests by Reza Pahlavi, the son of Iran's last shah. On 8 January, 1.5 million protesters took to the streets of Tehran and, by 9 January, 5 million people were protesting nationwide according to an unnamed European diplomat citing intelligence. Pahlavi has called for a peaceful transition and a referendum to determine Iran's future political system. The Iranian government has cut off Internet access and telephone services in an attempt to prevent protesters from organising. It has accused the United States and Israel of fuelling the protests.

By 9 January, millions had taken to the streets in protests across all 31 provinces. Amid the internet blackout, Iranian security forces escalated their use of live ammunition against demonstrators. Hospitals in Tehran and Shiraz were reported to be overwhelmed by injured protesters, many suffering gunshot wounds. Iran's foreign ministry spokesperson confirmed that security forces had fired on protesters, raising international concern over human rights. Thousands were also arrested during the violent crackdown. Despite the blackout, on 10 January 2026, The Guardian documented multiple reports of security forces opening fire on demonstrations, with one eyewitness stating they saw "hundreds of bodies" across Tehran.

By late January, Time, The Guardian and Iran International, citing local health officials, reported estimates that between 30,000 and 36,500 protesters were killed during 8–9 January. On 20 January the International Centre for Human Rights (ICHR) said its investigation estimated that at least 43,000 people had been killed by Iranian government forces during the protests. As of 5 February 2026, the US-based Human Rights Activists News Agency (HRANA) had confirmed and documented 7,015 deaths, including at least 6,508 protesters, with 11,744 additional cases under review. The Iranian government had reported 3,117 deaths, while local health officials said the total death toll could be as high as 30,000.

On 11 February, President Pezeshkian apologized to the nation for the massacres. On 21 February, a second major wave of student‑led protests erupted at the start of the new academic semester across several Iranian universities. Demonstrations included sit‑ins and campus protests. The renewed unrest coincided with forty‑day memorials for those killed in earlier protests and featured chants against Ali Khamenei as well as calls for Reza Pahlavi to replace him. During the unrest, a student at the Iran University of Science and Technology in Tehran died, Iranian state media attributed the death to a "sudden health incident". Protests continued over the following days, with demonstrations from 23 to 25 February adopting the Lion and Sun flag and featuring anti‑government chants. University authorities and security forces declared the protests "illegal", conducted searches of student dormitories, and arrested suspected participants, while Basij members and other security forces attacked protesters at several universities.

Following the escalation of the 2026 Iran war and strikes on government and military targets, protests continued across Iran despite renewed internet shutdowns and heavy security deployments. Demonstrations took the form of nightly rooftop chants from residential buildings, with videos showing security forces firing towards people chanting from windows. The assassination of Ali Khamenei marked a turning point, with gatherings and celebrations in several areas despite violent crackdowns. After the government announced Mojtaba Khamenei as the new supreme leader on 8 March, protesters chanted "Death to Mojtaba" in residential neighborhoods. Opposition figure Reza Pahlavi later urged Iranians to remain in their homes while continuing rooftop chants as a sign of unity, while the Islamic Revolutionary Guard Corps threatened a wider crackdown. During Chaharshanbe Suri celebrations ahead of Nowruz, many Iranians defied official restrictions and gathered in the streets, prompting security forces to disperse crowds with gunfire.

== Background ==
=== Economic crisis in Iran ===
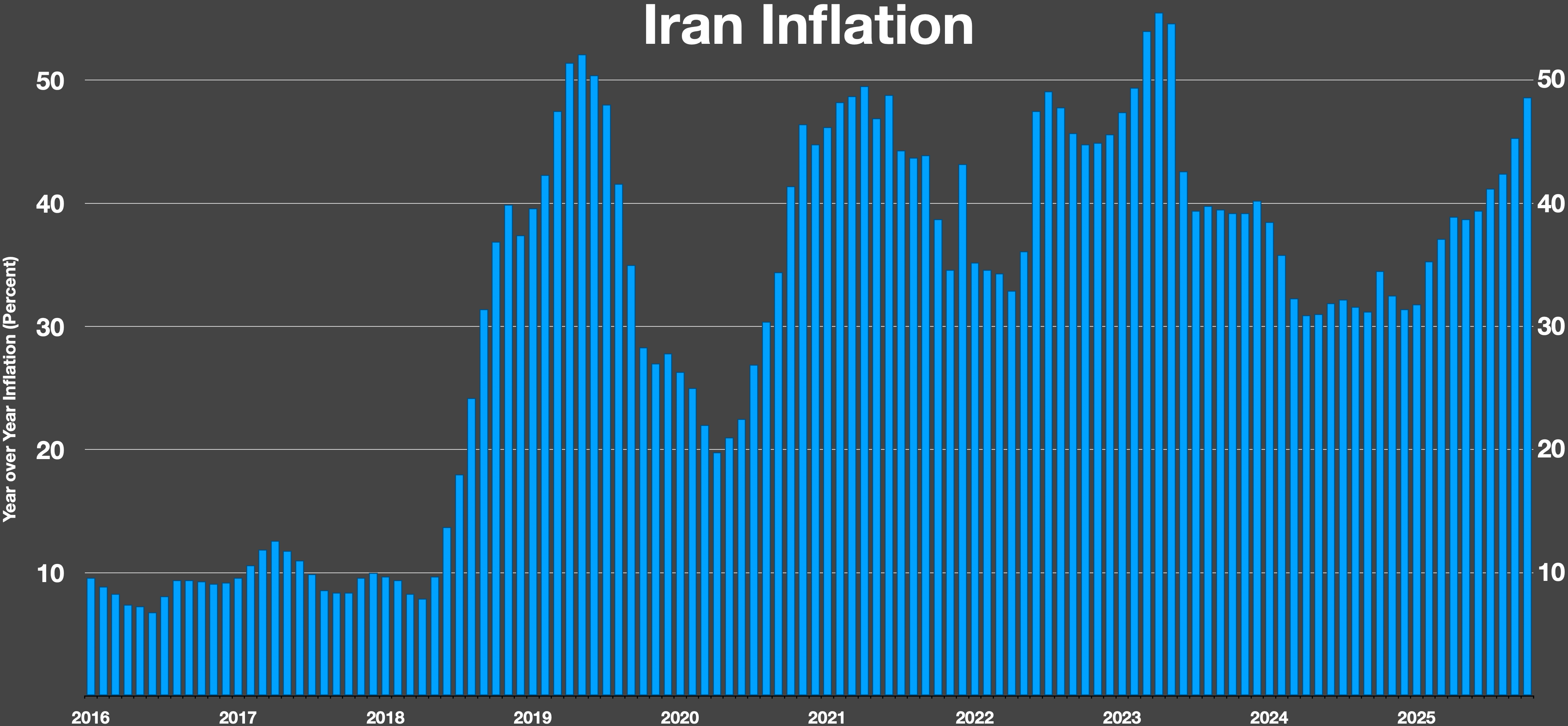
Annual inflation in Iran since 2016

Beginning in 2024, Iran's economy experienced sharp inflation, a devalued currency, and an energy shortage, which culminated in widespread electricity and gas disruptions and apologies from president Masoud Pezeshkian. Iran has suffered declines in global influence, most notably following the fall of the Assad regime in Syria, a major ally. The economic crisis was compounded by fears of renewed conflict after the June 2025 Twelve-Day War with Israel during which Iran's nuclear facilities were struck by the United States. In September 2025, the UN reimposed sanctions on Iran using the "snapback" mechanism, causing the currency to weaken, resulting in price increases for food supplies such as meat, rice, and other staples, freezing Iranian assets abroad, suspending arms transactions, and imposing penalties related to the country's ballistic-missile programme.

Many Iranians feared a broader confrontation involving the US, which contributed to market instability. In the final months of 2025, Iran's economy experienced a sharp depreciation of the Iranian rial, with the US dollar reaching approximately 145,000 Iranian tomans. The country's state statistics centre reported an inflation rate of 42% in December 2025. Food prices rose 72%, while prices for health and medical goods increased by 50% year-on-year. By 3 January, the government increased the value of the rial to 1.38 million. This had no effect, and on 6 January the rial fell to a new record low of 1.5 million to the US dollar, triggering a sharp rise in prices, including food and other essential goods. Analysts cited government monetary and fiscal policies, economic mismanagement, chronic budget deficits, and the continuation of sanctions as key contributing factors. These conditions directly affected trade guilds, particularly businesses dependent on imports. In February 2026, US Treasury Secretary Scott Bessent acknowledged that US sanctions policy had contributed directly to Iran's currency crisis. In testimony before the US Senate Banking Committee, Bessent stated: "What we have done is created a dollar shortage in the country. It came to a swift and, I would say, grand culmination in December, when one of the largest banks in Iran went under. The central bank had to print money. The Iranian currency went into free fall. Inflation exploded, and hence we have seen the Iranian people out on the street."

Iran is experiencing a mismanaged water crisis. Reports in Iranian media indicated the government planned to raise taxes with the start of the Iranian new year on 21 March, fuelling further concern. Some protest messaging linked economic hardship to criticism of the government's foreign policy; during the December 2025 demonstrations, some participants chanted "Neither Gaza nor Lebanon, My Life for Iran". Discontent has also been due to political corruption, with protesters accusing the government of authoritarianism and prioritising proxies such as Hezbollah and Hamas over domestic needs. Iran faces challenges from ethnic secessionist movements from the Kurds, Azerbaijanis, Khuzestani Arabs, and Balochis and from the US and Israel.

There were calls for the overthrow of the government, and distrust in the government's calls for dialogue, seeing them as self-serving and deceptive. NPR reported that months before the protests, public anger and frustration had been mounting due to energy shortages, civil rights abuses and widespread corruption, and that the protests sparked concerns that they could deteriorate into something much more serious. The political character of the protests was marked by protesters chanting "Death to the Dictator" in reference to supreme leader Ali Khamenei, and their loss of faith in Pezeshkian, who was elected in 2024 on promises of good governance, but had overseen water and electricity cuts, while failing to deliver on the promise of lifting internet censorship. Pezeshkian promised to meet with protest representatives, and recognized "the constitutional right of peaceful protest", although he lacked control over security forces. By 1 January 2026, dozens of protesters had been arrested and there were cases of security forces firing live ammunition at protesters. Students at Shahid Beheshti University released a statement declaring that "This criminal system has taken our future hostage for 47 years. It won't be changed with reform or with false promises".

=== Comparison to previous protests ===
The protests were described as Iran's largest since 2022, when nationwide demonstrations erupted following the death of 22-year-old Mahsa Amini while in police custody for allegedly wearing her hijab improperly. On 30 December, Ellie Borhan, a British-Iranian activist, viewed this wave of protests as stronger than previous ones. Iranian public faith in their government faded since the 2022 crackdown on the Woman, Life, Freedom movement during the Mahsa Amini protests. Protests were previously held in May 2025 by truck drivers beginning in Bandar Abbas, who blocked roads and ports in Iran due to discontent over low salaries, high insurance rates, and possible hikes in fuel prices in the future.

Protest slogans have shifted ideologically compared to the 2022 protests. Some new chants increasingly reflect monarchist sentiments. Already in June 2025, during the Twelve-Day War, the exiled crown prince Reza Pahlavi had intensified his political efforts and appealed to the international community to help the Iranian people force out Ali Khamenei's theocratic rule while offering himself up as interim leader to take over running the country. In comparison to the Mahsa Amini protests (2022–2023) which were mainly fuelled by girls and women, young men played larger roles in later rounds of the 2025–2026 protests.

Market traders were influential during the 1979 Islamic Revolution, helping to mobilise public support that ultimately led to the overthrow of the monarchy. The demonstrations were notable in the context of a large-scale government crackdown on dissidents, including arrests of prominent opponents and the highest number of executions in nearly 40 years. Executions in Iran have reportedly doubled in 2025 compared to 2024; the execution trends were on the rise since 2022, with activists alleging that the Islamic Republic aims to use executions to instil fear in its population and therefore suppress internal opposition.

Kurdish-majority regions in Iran have previously undergone severe repression stemming from the Amini protests in 2022, leading to fears of ethnic crackdowns from the government. This was in part due to Iran's accusing Kurdish opposition groups of having incited the 2022 protests. Despite this, Kurdish opposition groups have continued to call for solidarity in the nationwide protests and strikes. Iran has also repeatedly accused Kurdish militias from Iraq of attempting to incite unrest, including in the protests in 2026. Likewise, Balochi regions in Iran, long suffering from underdevelopment and political exclusion, have also previously been subject to violent crackdowns in the Amini protests. On 10 December 2025, Sunni-Balochi militant groups in Iran like the Jaysh al-Adl announced a merger into a united organization called the Jebhe-ye Mobaarezin-e Mardomi (People's Fighters Front). In its coalition video, the union rejected Shia Islam-led clerical rule in the Islamic Republic. The same day, the group carried out an attack on an Islamic Revolutionary Guard Corps regional command, killing four of its soldiers and wounding three others; it announced responsibility for the attack the next day.

== Protests ==
Animated map of the geographical scope of the protests on their first few days

Map of the geographical scope of the protests during the first week

Counties in Iran where protests had been reported as of 6 February 2026 highlighted in orange

=== Initial bazaar ===
==== 28 December 2025 ====
On 28 December, groups of shopkeepers and merchants at Alaeddin Shopping Centre in Tehran and other commercial centres, including Charsou Mall, went on strike by closing their shops. Simultaneously, protest gatherings formed around these locations, and images and videos of widespread shop closures circulated on social media. According to reports, protesters cited the rising dollar exchange rate and market instability, warning that continued conditions would lead to the bankruptcy of many small and medium-sized businesses. Some gatherings extended into surrounding streets, including Jomhuri Street. Other people had joined in with the shopkeepers to protest against economic conditions on Jomhuri Street. Elsewhere, iron traders in Iran closed their shops in similar protests against the devalued currency.

Around the onset of the protests, the value of the Iranian rial sank to a record low of 1.45 million per US dollar before slightly recovering to 1.38 million. The rial had lost approximately 40 percent of its value since the Twelve-Day War, in part due to the sinking of oil revenue from US sanctions. The year-on-year inflation rate was up at 42.2 percent. The protests were first started by shopkeepers who sold electronic goods in central Tehran who shut down their stores. State media revealed blurred footage of initially smaller-scale protests by merchants.

Videos and eyewitness accounts showed groups of merchants chanting slogans against economic mismanagement and in some cases expressing anti-government sentiments. Protesters also chanted "Law Enforcement, support, support", calling on security forces to back the protests. The protesters' main demands included stabilizing exchange rates, addressing merchants' economic hardships, creating a predictable business environment, and preventing losses caused by market volatility. There were no reported clashes with security forces on this day and it remained peaceful.

==== 29 December ====
The protests continued into their second day on 29 December and expanded across various parts of Tehran, including the Grand Bazaar. Merchants and shopkeepers closed their businesses and gathered in the streets to protest the unprecedented collapse of the rial and sharp increases in currency and gold prices. Protesters voiced opposition to economic conditions and government management, citing declining purchasing power and rising living costs. Videos shared online showed continued gatherings around Lalehzar, Chaharsouq, and Jomhuri Street, with participants largely non-violent while conveying critical messages toward government economic policies. The merchants at the Grand Bazaar in Tehran joined the electronic goods shopkeepers who had started the protests the previous day.

Footage verified by independent sources showed crowds at malls near Tehran's Grand Bazaar chanting "freedom" (Persian: آزادی, romanised: Âzâdi). Law enforcement forces used tear gas to disperse demonstrators outside the Alaeddin Shopping Centre. Protests also spread to other cities in Iran. On the night of 29 December 2025, protests were reported in several regions across Iran, including Qeshm in the south, and Zanjan and Hamadan in the north. Demonstrators chanted slogans critical of the supreme leader, including "Death to the Dictator" on Qeshm Island and "Seyyed Ali [Khamenei] will be toppled this year" in Zanjan. A video and photo of an unidentified protester went viral, who defiantly sat in the middle of the Jomhuri Eslami Street at Tehran and refused to move for motorbike security forces, but later was beaten and forced to leave. The protester became known as Tehran's Tank Man, a reference to the Tank Man during the 1989 Tiananmen Square protests and massacre.

=== Spread across Iran ===
==== 30 December ====
By the third day of protests, strikes and security measures had expanded, with shops closing in parts of Tehran such as Shoush and Molavi, as well as in Isfahan's Naqsh-e Jahan Square. Heavy security deployments were reported in Tehran, Mashhad, and at Khajeh Nasir University. Government responses included ordering temporary closures in 11 provinces, including Tehran province, due to cold weather and energy constraints. Security forces fired on protesters in Hamadan and deployed tear gas in Tehran and Malard.

Demonstrations spread to additional cities, including Kermanshah, Shiraz, Yazd, and parts of Tehran such as Shadabad and Shush. Students from universities including Amirkabir, Beheshti, Khajeh Nasir, Sharif, Science and Culture and Tehran Science and Technology as well as Isfahan University of Technology and Yazd University joined rallies, chanting slogans such as "Death to the Dictator", "Death to Khamenei", "Neither Gaza nor Lebanon, My Life for Iran", "We are all together", and "Seyyed Ali (Khamenei) will be toppled this year". President Masoud Pezeshkian called on the government to listen to citizens' demands. In response, a government spokesman said a Communication Group would be implemented. Pezeshkian's comments did not appear to have appeased the protesters, whose demands went beyond just economic stability. Furthermore, some Iranians expressed scepticism in the government's ability to solve the economic problems, citing previous government statements that they were unable to do much about solving the economic problems.

Human rights organisations and Gen Z student groups reported that 11 protesters were arrested in the Shoush Square area in Tehran and that five students were detained and four were later released. Another news report published that one student was severely injured at Tehran's Amirkabir University during a crackdown on a campus gathering by members of the Basij militia of the Islamic Revolutionary Guard Corps. Videos on social media appeared to show students chanting slogans critical of the government, removing signs associated with the office of the Supreme Leader's representatives, and confronting security forces at university entrances.

==== 31 December ====
The people of Isfahan, Kermanshah, and Fasa gathered on the fourth day of protests. In Fasa, people held a large rally in front of the governor's office, and in Kermanshah, the markets went on a complete strike. According to reports, police fired live ammunition and tear gas, at the protesters. At the same time, in Shirvan, working and retired teachers gathered in front of the Education Department. In Kermanshah, repressive forces have been deployed from Ferdowsi Square to the garage (about 8 kilometres), and the heavy presence of security forces is noticeable. One person named Mahdi Samavati was reported to have been killed outside the governor's office protest in Fasa. The semi-official Mehr News Agency quoted the governor of Fasa as denying this report. The Jerusalem Post stated on 31 December that Samavati (given name transcribed as Mehdi) was alive according to several sources, and that the rumour of Samavati's death was disinformation by the authorities aiming at frightening the protesters. Video recordings disseminated online and distributed by the People's Mojahedin Organisation of Iran depict severe confrontations between demonstrators and security forces in several cities, including Tehran, Isfahan, Shiraz, and Kermanshah.

Protester Amirhesam Khodayarifard was killed by a handgun shot to the head by an Iranian security force member in a protest in Kuhdasht, Lorestan province on 31 December. The state-run IRNA news agency and Mehr confirmed the death and stated that Khodayarifard was a member of the Basij. Government authorities pressured Khodayarifard's family to state that he had been a Basij member and called for online social media silence on the topic. The shooting occurred during clashes with protesters. According to Mehr, 13 police officers and Basij members were injured.

The government ordered nationwide total business shutdown in most of the country due to "cold weather", although some analysts say that the real intention is to stifle protests. The shutdown was applied to 21 out of Iran's 31 provinces. The government began threatening to crack down on protesters, and the US State Department stated that they were concerned about protesters "facing intimidation, violence, and arrests". Video footage records protesters like merchants, women's rights activists, and students commonly shouting the slogans "Death to the dictator" and "Neither Gaza nor Lebanon, my life for Iran". In response to the ongoing protests, the Iranian government appointed Abdolnasser Hemmati, a former economics minister, as the new governor of the Central Bank of Iran, following Mohammad Reza Farzin's resignation.

=== 2026 ===
==== 1 January ====
On the fifth day of protests, workers and employees of the central fruit and vegetable market in Tehran stopped working and joined the nationwide uprising by stopping the distribution cycle. Chanting the slogan, "You know with zeal, support support", the protesters called on marketers and the general public to strengthen the national will for change by expanding the strikes. Police officers used tear gas to disperse the demonstrators. According to reports, Sarira Karimi, secretary of the faculty council of the Faculty of Law and Political Science and a member of the faculty council of the University of Tehran, who had been arrested on 31 December 2025, was released on 1 January 2026.

Protesters were reported to have gathered in Marvdasht and chanted slogans against the Islamic Republic government, such as "This is the year of blood, Seyyed Ali is overthrown". In Mashhad, protesters gathered at Saadi Metro Station, where riot police attempted to disperse the crowd with force. In the Sistan and Baluchestan province, a group of Baluch prisoners released a statement calling on locals to join the wider protests and urged for slogans like "Death to the dictator" and "Baluchestan is awake and despises dictatorship".

In Lorestan, home to the Lur minority, protesters were reported lighting fires in the streets while also chanting, "This is the year of blood, Seyyed Ali is overthrown". Additional reports claim officers used live ammunition against protesters. In Lordegan County, gatherings took place in several parts of Lordegan City, including around the governor's office and the municipality square. According to these reports, as tensions escalated, some individuals attempted to damage government and bank buildings. Police used tear gas to disperse the crowds, and clashes were reported between the two sides. Several people were injured during the unrest, and unconfirmed reports suggested that multiple deaths had occurred. At least three people, including a boy, were killed in Lordegan. There was a heavy presence of government forces in Qom.

==== 2 January ====
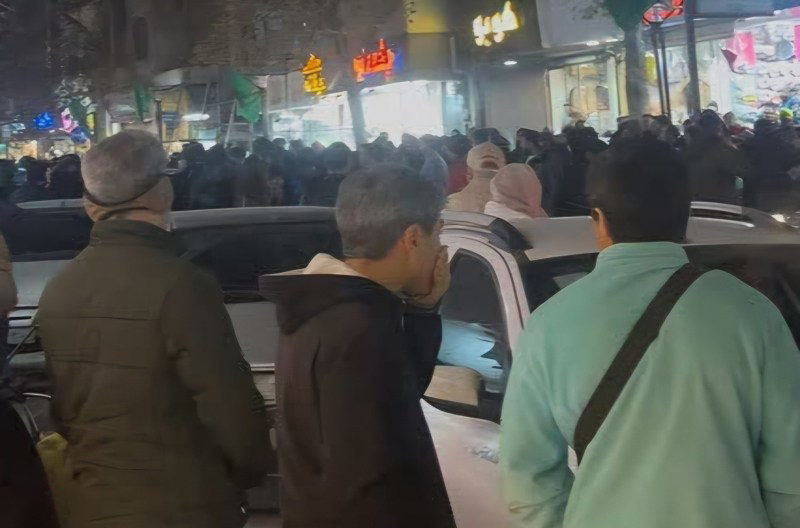
Crowds during protests in Qazvin on 2 January

On 2 January, according to media reports, protests continued in large numbers in Tehran, Qom, Isfahan, Shiraz, Ilam, Mashhad, Karaj, Zanjan, Hamadan, and Qeshm. In Zahedan and Tehran, protests became active again. Funerals for protesters killed by the security forces were held in Fuladshahr, Kuhdasht, and Marvdasht, during which participants expressed opposition to the government, including chants of "Death to Khamenei". At the Kuhdasht funeral for Khodayarifard, Basij and IRGC forces were chased away from the funeral with stones and chants. Khodayarifard's father confirmed that his son was not a Basij member. In the Sadaf district of Hamadan province, protesters were seen setting fire to a Quran and attempting to attack a mosque before being stopped by authorities.

==== 3 January ====
Protests on 3 January were greater in geographic spread and numbers of protesters than on previous days, and the security presence was also greater. The National Council of Resistance of Iran (NCRI) and Human Rights Activists News Agency (HRANA) named some of the locations of demonstrations, including Kazerun, Malekshahi, Kermanshah, Shiraz, Mashhad, Arkavaz, Isfahan, Tehran, Hafshejan, Karaj, Shahrekord, and Fardis. HRANA reported a cumulative count of 16 fatalities since the beginning of the protests, including one member of government security forces. The themes of the protests, as represented by slogans chanted on 3 January, ranged from economic injustice and governance problems to calls for freedom and justice. HRANA viewed the protest aims as having evolved, with "the boundary between trade-related and everyday demands and political demands ha[ving] become blurred, and [the] ongoing protests hav[ing] taken shape on the basis of accumulated, multilayered grievances."

Following statements by US President Donald Trump, where he warns Iran that if they shoot protesters, the United States will come to their rescue, Supreme Leader Ali Khamenei responded on 3 January by saying "We will not yield to the enemy", and stating that the "rioters must be put in their place." On the same day, the US State Department made a statement condemning the suppression of protesters' funerals. Cloudflare reported a 35% decrease in internet traffic in Iran, with Iranian internet users reporting frequent outages and slow connections.

==== 4 January ====
There was a heavy presence of security forces in the Grand Bazaar of Tehran. Protests and strikes took place in at least 20 major cities and small towns throughout Iran. Donald Trump said that Iranian authorities would be "hit very hard" should additional protesters be killed. In Shiraz, videos showed the police assaulting and beating a man on the ground. When protesters threw projectiles at the police, officers moved toward them on motorcycles. Moments later, a protester poured gasoline on one officer setting him alight.

==== 5 January ====
On the ninth day, the protests continued throughout Iran. In Tehran's Bagh-e Sepahsalar neighbourhood, voices echoed chants of "Death to Khamenei". Near Tehran University, special forces stood on high alert, while reports of widespread strikes emerged from cities such as Marvdasht, where resistance pulsed through daily life. In Yasuj, security forces confronted the families of detainees gathered outside the governor's office. Reports say that the protests have reached the smaller towns of Saman, Sangsar, and Kushk, as part of the dissatisfaction of the Iranian people.

In addition to the cities previously mentioned, protests were reported in several other locations across the country, including Saman in Chaharmahal and Bakhtiari Province, Sangsar in Semnan Province, Zahedan, Fardis in Karaj, Meshkan in Fars Province, and Noorabad in Mamasani. Demonstrations were further documented in Qazvin, Hamedan, Ilam, Mashhad, Neyshabur, Abadeh, Bushehr, Babol, Bojnourd, Kushk in Isfahan Province, Shazand in Markazi Province, as well as the northern cities of Rasht and Sari. According to reports, protesters in these areas gathered in public spaces, chanting slogans and expressing dissatisfaction with the Khamenei government, reflecting the continued spread of nationwide unrest.

==== 6 January ====
In a joint statement, several major Kurdish political groups, including the Kurdistan Democratic Party of Iran (KDPI), Komala, the Revolutionary Toilers Association, the Kurdistan Toilers Association, the Khabat Organisation, the Kurdistan Freedom Party (PAK), and the Kurdistan Free Life Party (PJAK), expressed support for the protests and called on Kurds in Iran to carry out strikes and demonstrations. The cities of Abdanan and Malekshahi, both in the Kurdish region of Iran, were abandoned by the country's security forces, leaving control of the cities to the protesters.

A sit-in was conducted by protesters at the Grand Bazaar in Tehran. Merchants at the market held strikes, in particular with many shops in the corridors of the gold and currency, fabric, footwear and home appliances markets partially or fully closed. The strikes appeared to be spontaneous, and according to some reports the Bazaar became a "war zone". The sit-in was dispersed by security forces using tear gas. The total number of protest locations over the ten days was estimated by HRANA to be 285 locations in 88 cities across 27 provinces, with protests having taken place in 22 universities. The slogans of the protests continued to cover a wide range of economic, social and political grievances.

In Yazdan Shahr, locals reported that police used excessive force against protesters, initially deploying tear gas and later firing live ammunition at civilians. The security forces' raids on the Sina Hospital in Tehran and on the Imam Khomeini Hospital in Ilam, aiming to arrest injured protesters, gained national attention. In Ilam, families and medical staff resisted the security forces. Security forces' methods of attack at the Ilam hospital included firing tear gas inside the buildings and on the hospital grounds. The Minister of Interior was ordered to investigate the Ilam raid and provide a report.

On 6 January, a total of 15 forced video confessions by arrested protesters had been broadcast on official media. On online social media, Reza Pahlavi called for chants to take place from homes and in streets at 20:00 (8 pm) IRST on the evenings of 8 and 9 January. He explained the aim as being to "keep [the] demonstrations disciplined, and as large as possible". He promised to "announce the next calls to action" depending on the response to his call.

==== 7 January ====
According to HRANA, street gatherings, protests and strikes took place in 37 cities in 24 provinces, bringing the total since the beginning of the protests to 348 sites across 111 cities in 31 provinces. Ten universities joined the protest on 7 January, making a total of 45. The total number of televised forced confessions by arrestees rose to 40. Artists and teachers published statements supporting the protests and criticising the security forces' repression against protest participants.

HRANA interpreted the continuation of the protests despite arrests and violence by the security forces as showing that "a significant portion of [Iranian] society [had come to view] the cost of protest as lower than the cost of silence and inaction". Key themes continued to be economic and governance grievances, seen as "two facets of a single issue". HRANA interpreted the artists' and teachers' statements as showing that "professional and cultural sectors [we]re increasingly aligning themselves with the protest narrative".

Militants affiliated with the People's Fighters Front (PFF), a newly-formed coalition of Sunni Baloch nationalist militant organisations, assassinated Mahmoud Haqiqat, the police chief of Iranshahr. IRGC-affiliated media reported that protesters killed two Law Enforcement Command officers during protests in Lordegan as well as an unspecified security force member in Malekshahi. In Mashhad, protesters were seen lowering a massive flag of the Islamic Republic and later ripping it in half.

The Komala Party of Iranian Kurdistan called for a general strike in Iran, receiving support from six other Iranian Kurdish opposition parties. The authorities attempted to forcibly disperse the existing protests over economic conditions in the cities of western Iran (Iranian Kurdistan) ahead of the announced date, reportedly with the use of live ammunition.

=== Internet blackout and protest intensification ===
==== 8 January ====
Protesters in the Kashani Boulevard area of Tehran, January 8, 2026

Protests escalated after 20:00, the time specified in Pahlavi's calls for demonstrations. Immediate telephone line and internet cuts occurred in cities, following a government practice before intense crackdowns. Starlink satellite internet service was unaffected, allowing users to bypass government-controlled internet blackouts. Crowds chanting in Tehran appeared to be mainly pro-Pahlavi. CBS News described the protests as reaching "a possible tipping point", and according to Euronews it represented "a new escalation in the protest movement". In Qaemiyeh, protesters pulled down a statue of Qasem Soleimani, an IRGC commander who was assassinated by the US in 2020 and declared a martyr by the Islamic Republic. In Mashhad, a group of protesters had taken down and torn up a large flag of the Islamic Republic.

Human rights organisation Hengaw claimed two IRGC Ground Forces members were killed during the protests in Kermanshah. A police officer in Malard County was killed from a stabbing after attempts to control unrest. Human rights groups verified a video showing "distressed family members" in Ghadir hospital in Tehran, looking through a body-pile of protesters killed by security forces.

==== 9 January ====
Protesters took to the streets on Friday night. Pahlavi asked Trump to support the protesters. The Economist reported that the protests had grown to be the biggest since 2009, while "some veteran Iran-watchers thought the protests were the biggest since the overthrow of the shah in 1979." NDTV 24x7 reported a viral trend of women lighting cigarettes to burn pictures of Khamenei in videos, gaining popularity on social media. Because burning Khamenei's image is illegal in Iran, observers have interpreted the videos as defiance, with the women rejecting state authority over their freedom. The trend was recorded by other news outlets, which similarly note rejection of strict religious and governmental standards imposed on women.

Khamenei addressed the protests in a televised appearance. Khamenei called Trump "arrogant", saying his hands were stained with the blood of Iranians, and Trump would be overthrown like other arrogant leaders. He described the protesters as harmful individuals and rioters. Protesters set fire to buildings in Tehran, including mosques in the Gholhak and Sa'adat Abad neighbourhoods. Opposition media reported that clashes between protesters and security forces in Kermanshah Province killed at least 10 IRGC Kermanshah Nabi Akram Corps members. Gholam-Hossein Mohseni-Eje'i, Iran's judiciary chief, stated that protesters would face severe punishment. US intelligence officers told Axios that their evaluation these protests were incapable of destabilising the regime was "being reassessed".

Trump warned Iran's authorities against killing demonstrators while praising Iranians as "brave people". The Twemoji emoji library changed the Iran flag emoji from the flag of the Islamic Republic to the modern design of the Lion and Sun flag. Airline flights from the UAE, Qatar, Oman, and Turkey to Iranian cities were cancelled. Protests across all 31 provinces left millions in the streets, with at least 217 killed in Tehran's. Thousands were arrested by the violent crackdown. Nobel laureate Shirin Ebadi warned that, under the Internet blackout, the Islamic Republic may massacre the protesters. Despite the internet outage, on 10 January The Guardian documented reports of security forces opening fire on demonstrations, causing many casualties, with one eyewitness stating they saw "hundreds of bodies" throughout Tehran.

Doctors at hospitals in Tehran and Shiraz reported being overwhelmed by injured protesters, with some facilities suspending non-urgent admissions and surgeries due to the influx of patients, many of whom suffered gunshot wounds to the head and eyes. A doctor in Nishapur stated that security forces killed "at least 30 people...among them were children", and "a 5-year-old child was shot while in their mother's arms." According to the doctor, security forces had shot bystanders as well. They added that "hospitals are extremely chaotic and patients terrified to admit and be identified, for this reason, we are trying to inform people and treat them privately in clinics."

The Kurdistan National Guard announced that its Zagros Tornado units attacked an IRGC base in Nurabad, Lorestan, and injured three IRGC members.

==== 10 January ====
During the night, Tehran municipality workers were tasked to collect cartridge cases from the streets and deliver them to security forces. Despite the internet shutdown imposed by Islamic Republic authorities, thousands of protesters gathered in Tehran and throughout Iran overnight on 9–10 January, chanting "Death to Khamenei", and "Long live the shah". This followed a call by Pahlavi for protesters to seize control of city centres and hoist the former Lion and Sun flag, with a promise he would return to Iran soon. The Internet blackout disrupted life, including digital transactions, as well as the functioning of hospitals, pharmacies, and banks. Many businesses did not open.

The Internet outage has prevented proper documentation of the size of the demonstrations and the extent of police brutality against protesters. Iranian Nobel peace prize winner Shirin Ebadi stated she had heard testimonies reporting hundreds of wounded protesters at a single Tehran hospital. The Guardian received reports stating: "We're standing up for a revolution, but we need help. Snipers have been stationed behind the Tajrish Arg area [an affluent part of Tehran]." Another protester testified that many protesters had been shot, stating, "We saw hundreds of bodies", while a third testimony had witnessed a "very high" number of protesters being killed as security forces opened fire. Human rights activists stated the testimonies were consistent with reports they had received. The Guardian stated that protesters had requested international media cover reports of police brutality, with one activist saying "please make sure to state clearly that they are killing people with live ammunition."

Much of the international community, including the EU and US, showed support for the protesters. US Secretary of State Marco Rubio posted on X (formerly Twitter), "The United States supports the brave people of Iran", and president Donald Trump stated "Iran is looking at FREEDOM, perhaps like never before. The USA stands ready to help!!!" Mohammad Movahedi-Azad, attorney general of Iran, stated that protesters may be charged as the "enemy of God", or moharebeh, a crime prosecutable by death, according to CBS News. CBS also reported that state media reports of "no news of any gathering or chaos in Tehran and most provinces" were contradicted by a photo of demonstrations in Sa'adat Abad, and surveillance video from Fars News Agency in which protesters in Isfahan threw petrol bombs. The Young Journalists' Club, associated with state media, reported that protesters killed three volunteer Basij militia of the IRGC in Gachsaran. Pahlavi called for protests to continue, while stating he was "preparing to return to my homeland" and protesters should seize city centres. Iranian state media reported that Army Lieutenant Amin Salimi was shot and killed "while on mission" in the Khavaran District of Tehran. Human rights activists acknowledged his death on 20 January.

Protesters were engaged in violent conflict with government forces until dawn. A video from the Tehran Punak neighbourhood showed that as the government turned off street lights, the protesters set off fireworks and created a sea of light using their smartphones in defiance. An AI generated video, inspired by the actual protest and explicitly described as being AI-generated, was posted on Instagram and according to Deutsche Welle (DW) obtained 60 million views. The AI video was redistributed on other websites, with one redistributed copy receiving 750,000 views according to DW. Because of the lack of clear AI labelling in the redistributed video, DW described the redistributed, unlabelled copies as misinformation, using the word "fake". Videos showed explosions amid protests in Kerman and gunshots in Mashhad. Unlike previous days, on Saturday mostly IRGC and Basij were mobilised, who use live ammunition, according to witnesses. Iran International reported that at least 2,000 protesters had been killed over the previous 48 hours amidst the internet blackout, as security forces escalated use of lethal force. All online service were shut down too, including ATM machines, international phone calls, credit card transactions and business networks, as well as most news sources and social media.

==== 11 January ====
Khamenei and senior Iranian officials said they were willing to talk to the protesters about economic issues, but characterised the unrest as incitement by "rioters" and said the protests were funded by foreign powers. State media reported that President Pezeshkian gave a speech accusing foreign "terrorists" of inciting the protests; Pezeshkian stated: "We are determined, and have decided, to resolve economic problems by any means possible"

Parliament speaker Mohammad Bagher Ghalibaf gave a speech during a parliament session in which he warned of US military bases and regional ships and Israel would be subject to retaliation if Iran is attacked by the US in reference to Trump's threats. In the session, hardliner politicians went to the dais and shouted "Down with America". Demonstrators rallied in Paris, Vilnius, and London in solidarity with the protests in Iran and urged Western governments to support the Iranian people seeking freedom. The New York Times reported that Trump was briefed on military options on Iran but did not yet make a final decision.

Forbes reported that the Iranian government successfully shut down the Starlink internet amidst the internet blackout. Other sources say Iran has successfully disrupted Starlink network connectivity nationwide, reporting that up to 80% of Starlink traffic was interrupted due to coordinated jamming operations. During a solidarity rally in Los Angeles on 11 January, a U-Haul truck was used to ram into protesters at Westwood. In Iran, fighters from the Balochi People's Fighters Front killed one Law Enforcement Command officer and injured another in an attack on an LEC patrol vehicle in Dashtiari County, Sistan and Baluchistan Province.

==== 12 January ====
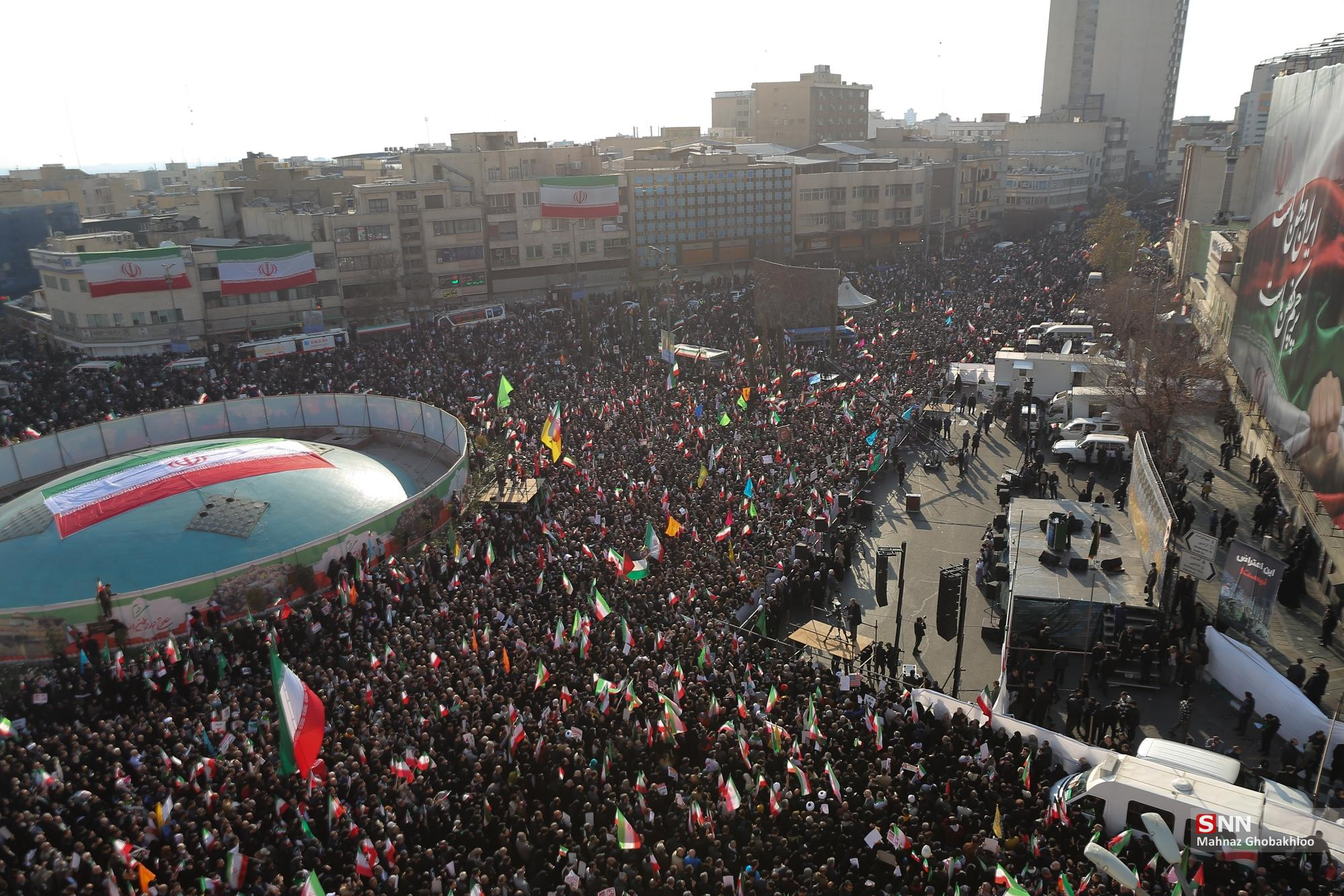
Pro-government demonstrations in Tehran, 12 January

In Tehran, a pro-government rally was held to counter the protests with tens of thousands of attendees in an attempt to project an air of normality. Videos posted on YouTube showed large crowds of people flying the regime flag and chanting Islamic slogans; however, reports from Iran International stated that images and videos were altered. President Masoud Pezeshkian was seen taking part in one rally. US president Donald Trump stated that Iran has reached out to the United States to negotiate its nuclear programme, following his threat to strike the Islamic Republic over its violent crackdown on protesters.

==== 13 January ====
On 13 January, Iran International reported that at least 12,000 people had been killed, describing the massacre as the "largest killing in Iranian contemporary history". CBS News reported that 12,000 people have been killed, and possibly 20,000, as Iran's phone services were being restored, and new information was being released.

President Trump urged Iranians to keep protesting and stated that help was on the way, with no details. Trump said in a post on Truth Social:

'"Iranian Patriots, KEEP PROTESTING - TAKE OVER YOUR INSTITUTIONS!!!... HELP IS ON ITS WAY"'

When a reporter asked what he meant by "help is on its way", he replied, "You're going to have to figure that one out. I'm sorry."

==== 14 January ====
The Kurdistan Freedom Party assaulted the IRGC's headquarters in Kermanshah and, allegedly, according to the KFP's own claims, successfully infiltrated the headquarters and caused severe IRGC casualties. Armed Kurdish groups clashed with the IRGC while seeking to cross the border from Iraq and Turkey into Iran; the IRGC had received warning about their movements from Turkey.

A video, analysed by BBC Verify and BBC Persian, showed, according to forensic examination, nearly 200 bodies scattered in the morgue, many with obvious wounds, including one victim who was only 16 years old. The Iran Human Rights Organisation (IHRNGO), based in Norway, said that at least 3,428 protesters were killed by Iranian security forces and at least 10,000 protesters were arrested during the peak of the unrest in Iran from 8 to 12 January. The head of Iran's judiciary stated that those arrested during the nationwide protests would be swiftly tried and executed. Washington has threatened military action in response to the crackdown.

British and American troops withdrew from Al Udeid Air Base in Qatar. The US stated that the withdrawal was a precautionary measure. "It's a posture change and not an ordered evacuation", a diplomat told Reuters. Italy and Poland, among other countries, have been urging their citizens to leave Iran "immediately". Donald Trump said in the Oval Office that he had been informed that killings of protesters in Iran had ceased, and he believed that there were "no plans for executions". According to AFP, Iranian state television broadcast footage of Donald Trump's attempted assassination at the 2024 Butler, Pennsylvania rally, accompanied by the Persian message "This time, [the bullet] won't miss", which angered Texas Republican Senator Ted Cruz and other close allies of President Trump.

=== Nationwide curfew and crackdown ===
==== 15 January ====
The Iranian government imposed a nationwide curfew to prevent any protests and deployed security forces and tanks to patrol towns and cities across the nation. ISW recorded zero protests on either 14 January or 15 January.

==== 16 January ====
The Human Rights Activists News Agency reported that 22,104 protesters had been arrested. In Zahedan, a small protest was reported after a Friday prayer sermon by Sunni cleric Abdolhamid Ismaeelzahi, during which he condemned the Iranian government's response to the protests. In Tehran, the Friday prayer imam, Ayatollah Ahmad Khatami, called for the execution of detained protesters. A slight increase in internet activity to 2% was recorded by HRANA, despite the restrictions.

==== 17 January ====
ISW recorded zero protests in the streets on 17 January amidst the ongoing enforced curfew. On 17 January, Iran International reported that security forces were visiting homes and businesses to identify protesters and pressuring them to hand over CCTV footage, while also setting up checkpoints in public areas to detain citizens found with protest images on their phones.

==== 18 January ====
In the evening, a cyberattack targeted IRIB, the Iranian state broadcaster. Hackers hijacked the station's transmissions and aired footage showing exiled Crown Prince Reza Pahlavi, followed by a group of men wearing the uniform of the security forces calling for them to not "point your weapons at the people" and instead "join the nation for the freedom of Iran." In Geneva, senior official at Iran's permanent mission to the UN, Ali Reza Jeyrani Hokmabad, requested asylum from Switzerland, deciding not to return to Iran out of fear of the social upheaval there. Hokmabad is reportedly one of several Iranian diplomats who requested asylum from European countries due to the protests.

==== 19 January ====
On 19 January, ABC News reported that the violent crackdown appeared to have quelled the protests. Iranian opposition member Mehdi Yahyanejad, interviewed by ABC, stated that "the crackdown has been so severe the protests have pretty much come to a halt". Due to the ongoing curfew, some Iranians chanted anti-government slogans from the windows of their homes in Tehran, Shiraz, and Isfahan.

==== 21 January ====
On 21 January, Iranian authorities announced that the protests had been suppressed following a severe crackdown. The Prosecutor-General of Iran Mohammad Movahedi Azad stated that the unrest had ended.

==== February ====
On 3 February, medical science students in Tabriz held an on-campus gathering, commemorating victims of the massacres. Similar gatherings were held in Mashhad and Shiraz. On 5 February, a multi-day sit-in by medical science students at Shiraz University of Medical Sciences continued. The Shiraz students were protesting against the overall crackdown and in support of medical staff.

Symbolic protests by the art community against official activities continued on 5 February. There were waves of withdrawals from the Fajr International Film Festival, including Amir Jadidi, who did not attend.

On the night of 10–11 February, while official ceremonies took place in preparation for the 11 February anniversary of the 1979 Iranian Revolution, people chanted explicitly anti-government slogans from their homes in several cities around Iran. Similar chants had been heard on previous nights. HRANA interpreted the chants as an "enduring [form] of civil disobedience". By the "global day of action" on 14 February, the chanting of anti-government slogans during the night had become "one of the [ongoing] forms of continued protest" in the context of the increasing repression. Locations of nighttime slogan chanting included Karaj, Babol, the Chitgar Park area of Tehran, and Kermanshah. A street protest was held in Abdanan on 16 February, while during the 17 February protests in Abdanan, security forces reportedly fired on mourners. Another protest was held in Najafabad on 18 February, while security forces and vehicles were deployed across Mashhad on 18 February amid the protester memorials.

=== Reignition of protests ===
==== 21 February ====
On 21 February, university students held several protests, including a sit-in at Shahid Beheshti University; a protest at Amirkabir University of Technology and a street blockage; a protest at Mashhad University of Medical Sciences; and a protest at Sharif University of Technology which was attacked by Basij members. The new wave of protests – which broke out at the beginning of the new semester, coincided with the 40-day memorial of those killed in the previous round of protests – included chants calling Khamenei a "murderous leader" and calls for Reza Pahlavi to replace him. One student at the Iran University of Science and Technology in Tehran died, with Iranian state media stating it was due to a sudden health incident in class.

==== 22 February ====
Students at major Iranian universities held protests in memory of those killed in the previous round of protests. Rallies included 'Death to the Dictator' chants.

==== 23 February ====
Security camera footage showing officers knocking down, beating, and arresting a young woman, 23 January

Student protests continued for the third consecutive day, adopting symbols of the Iranian monarchy. University administration and security forces stated that the protests were "illegal", conducted searches in the dormitories and arrested students suspected to be involved with the protests.

==== 24 February ====
Basij members and security forces attacked student protesters on the fourth day across several universities.

==== 25 February ====
Protests continued on 25 February, including 'Death to Khamenei' chants and the raising of the Lion and Sun flag at a university campus.

=== After the strikes ===
==== 28 February ====
On 28 February, the first day of the Israeli–United States strikes on Iran, Iranians chanted "Death to Khamenei" from the windows of their homes in continued protests. Female students at a school in Tehran chanted "Death to the Velayat". Many Iranians inside Iran celebrated and rejoiced in the joint American-Israeli strikes on Iran. As Iranians began pouring out into the streets in celebration, the internet blackout was renewed and special forces were deployed in the streets to prevent an uprising. Footage also showed security forces opening fire on celebrants in the streets.

Reza Pahlavi urged Iranians inside Iran to prepare to resume protests as the Islamic Republic "collapses", called on the military and security forces to side with the public rather than the ruling establishment, and described U.S. action against Iran as a "humanitarian intervention" while urging Donald Trump to avoid civilian harm.

==== March ====
Security forces remained deployed, holding weapons in the streets. Window protests continued from homes. Security forces were stationed at civilian sites such as schools and hospitals. Footage showed security forces shooting at people chanting behind the windows of their homes. After a spokesperson for the foreign ministry held a televised press conference from a classroom in Tehran, concerns grew over the authorities' use of civilian sites.

==== 2 March ====
On 2 March, the Iranian women's football team refused to sing the national anthem of the Islamic Republic of Iran prior to a Women's Asian Cup game against the South Korean team in Australia as a form of silent protest.

==== 5 March ====
On 5 March, the team was reportedly forced to sing the national anthem prior to the following game against Australia, with threats to the players' family members if they did not.

==== 8 March ====
After the team's exit from the tournament on 8 March, members of the team gave what appeared to be SOS hand signals from the bus as they were leaving, leading to protests and growing calls for Australia to offer the team refuge after the players were accused of being wartime traitors by Iranian state media for not singing the national anthem of the Islamic Republic in their opening game amid the Iran war.

After Mojtaba Khamenei was named the new Supreme Leader on 8 March, chants of "Death to Mojtaba" were heard from the windows of homes.

==== 10 March ====
On 10 March, Pahlavi urged Iranians to stay in their homes while awaiting for his "final call", and called for nightly rooftop chants to continue as a sign of unity. The same day, the chief of the police threatened that any protester taking to the streets would be seen as an "enemy", and security forces had their "fingers on the trigger" against the protesters.

==== 13 March ====
On 13 March, the IRGC threatened a crackdown bigger than the one in January.

==== 14 March ====
On 14 March, people chanted 'Long live the Shah' in the Chitgar neighborhood of Tehran.

==== 15 March ====
On 15 March, residents of the Saadat Abad neighborhood of Tehran chanted numerous anti-government slogans including "Long live the Shah," "Death to the IRGC and Basij," and "Death to the Islamic Republic."

==== 17 March ====
During the 17 March Chaharshanbe Suri festivities ahead of the 20 March Nowruz holiday, Iranians across Iran defied orders from the authorities and celebrated the festivities, while footage showed gunshots from security forces dispersing crowds. Protests from home windows with chants of "Javid Shah" also continued. Crowds also cheered from their homes and celebrated with fireworks after news of Ali Larijani's death.

==== 19 March ====
A video circulated of a woman standing at the grave of a protester killed in January stating "By the blood of our comrades, we stand until the end," "Javid Shah," and "Long live Iran."

On 19 March, the Islamic Republic executed three protesters.

==== 20 March ====
After the defiant Chaharshanbe Suri celebrations, Iran subsequently closed historic sites during Nowruz, stating the new year ceremonies would not be held in these locations. Images of Trump and Netanyahu were also seen on an Iranian family's haft-seen table during Nowruz. In his Nowruz message, Pahlavi stated that Iranians would "bury this Zahhak-like regime once and for all" and that "we will turn the new year into the year of victory for Iran's Lion and Sun revolution". In Trump's Nowruz message, he expressed hope that the Persian New Year would bring "peace and human dignity" while describing the ongoing war as a "righteous mission".

Amir Avivi, CEO of the Israel Defense and Security Forum and a retired brigadier general, stated, "It's a matter of weeks until the US and Israel will assess that this regime is weak enough. And then there will be a call to the Iranian people to go to the streets and take over the country. And when they do that, above their heads, there will be Israeli drones and American capabilities defending them from the air — and any attempt to hit the Iranian people will be met by an attack."

==== 21 March ====
On 21 March, Iran's head of police announced daily 24-hour vehicle and motorcycle patrols in neighborhoods of Tehran and other cities across Iran. Footage also showed deployed armoured vehicles and Basij forces across Iran.

==== 22 March ====
Security checkpoints and Basij patrols continued to be reported across Iran amid the ongoing internet blackout.

==== 24 March ====
Videos again showed security forces shooting at people chanting anti-government slogans from the windows of their apartments in Tehran.

==== 25 March ====
Window protests continued across apartment blocks in Tehran with protesters chanting "Death to Khamenei".

==== 26 March ====
Pictures of Ali Khamenei were set on fire at a protest in Gonabad.

==== 29 March ====
A resident in Tehran's Chitgar area is filmed saying "Thank you Trump" outside a police station destroyed by American airstrikes.

Also on 29 March, footage showed Iraq's Popular Mobilization Forces deployed again in Iran.

Rights groups stated an 11-year-old was killed while on duty at a Tehran checkpoint, days after Iran allowed children as young as 12 years of age to join their war support. Amnesty International stated Iran's recruitment of children amounts to a war crime.

==== Early April ====
Footage continued to show foreign Shia militias, namely the Iraqi Popular Mobilization Forces and the Afghan Liwa Fatemiyoun, parading through streets in Iran.

On 5 April, Trump stated that the Iranian people were "living in fear" and were "afraid that [the United States would] leave them in the middle of the war".

After the 8 April ceasefire, some Iranians stated they feel a sense of abandonment and despair, while some described the truce as a missed opportunity for political change that would allow the authorities to intensify domestic repression. The internet blackout continued after the 8 April ceasefire, passing the 1,000-hour mark by 11 April. On 14 April, armed security forces continued to be deployed in the streets.

==== Late April tiered Internet protests ====
In late April, during the internet blackout, officials associated with president Masoud Pezeshkian and several Iranian citizens' associations and individuals protested against the imposition by IRGC-aligned authorities of tiered Internet access (Persian: Internet Tabaghati).

On 22 April, Mehdi Tabatabaei, a spokesperson for Pezeshkian, stated that the tiered internet was "entirely inconsistent and in conflict with the policies ... and views of the president". Mohammad Reza Aref, one of the vice presidents of Iran, stated on the same day that "equal and non-discriminatory access to the internet must be provided for all segments of society". Minister of Information and Communications Technology of Iran Sattar Hashemi stated that "fair access to the internet is the right of all people, ... even from a security perspective, access should not be restricted through classification or whitelist systems."

On 26 and 27 April, an organisation of Iranian nurses and another Iranian citizens' association, the Graphic Designers Society, refused the authorities' proposals that the two organisations obtain access for their members to an "Internet Pro" (tiered Internet) exception to the internet blackout, arguing that it would be unfair until all citizens had regular Internet access. The Graphics Designers Society stated that "Free and affordable access to the internet is the right of all people, and [the society] expect[s] authorities to restore this right equally for everyone to prevent further losses for graphic designers." A group of Tehran University of Medical Sciences students published a statement declaring equal access to the Internet to be part of the rights to education and science, stating that unequal access would constitute discrimination, and refusing to use the tiered Internet access. The Internet firm Andropay refused to use the tiered Internet access, stating that tiered access would create a "gap between content creators and their audience". Criticisms of the tiered access within Iran included that access for sellers was pointless if buyers didn't have access. On 30 April, Tehran Province Journalists' Association criticised the tiered access as bad for business, "against citizens' legal rights" and "unethical", called for it to be "removed from the government's agenda", and stated that "Access to free, high-quality and universal internet is not a luxury but a public right, and governments are responsible for ensuring it." According to Iran International, a common reason cited by Iranians for refusal to participate in the tiered access was an objection to unequal Internet access.

The Reformists Front, an alliance of Iranian political parties, stated its objections to tiered Internet access on 30 April, asserted that equal access to the Internet beyond Iran is a citizens' right, and called for "people's access to stable, free and secure internetaccess [to] be restored immediately".

=== May/June student protests ===
In late May and early June, high school students protested in 20 provinces, objecting to repeated changes to exam and university entrance rules and educational conditions. In early June, students protested in Khorramabad, calling for transparency in exam conditions, and in Arak and Isfahan, opposing "in-person exams and poor educational conditions". Some students were injured in Yazd. At least one person was arrested in Qom. A protest in Tehran outside the Ministry of Education opposed the way that 11th-grade grades were used in university entrance exams. Slogans used in protests on 6 June included "Incompetent official we don't want you" in Shahr-e Kord and "Justice, education, our undeniable right" in Tehran in front of the Supreme Council of the Cultural Revolution. The protests grew in the first week of June. University students complained after 75 were hospitalised after eating subsidized meals at Shahid Sadoughi University of Medical Sciences. Several students were expelled, suspended, or banned from entering Shahid Sadoughi University, Sharif University of Technology and Kermanshah University of Medical Sciences for online and protest-related activities. The Coordination Council of Iranian Educators' Unions stated that the exam rules created "psychological pressure and widening inequality within the education system".

=== November protests ===
On 17 November, anti-government protests broke out in Abdanan, Ilam province, after a bus crash near Dehloran which killed 13 oil refinery workers on 14 November. Protesters initially gathered to demand the resignation of local company officials, citing poor road safety and institutional negligence. However, the demonstrations later expanded into broader anti-government movement, with footage posted to social media showing participants chanting "Death to the dictator" and shouting slogans directed at Supreme Leader Mojtaba Khamenei.

Iranian media outlets estimated that around 1,000 people attended the demonstration, which was the largest in the country since the January 2026 unrest. Security forces later dispersed the crowd and detained several participants amidst human rights groups' warnings of a wartime crackdown on domestic dissent.

== Methods ==
The Lion and Sun flag has become a widely used symbol of opposition to the Islamic Republic. Although its display inside Iran is strictly banned, protesters have increasingly begun waving it despite the serious risks involved.

=== Protesters ===
==== National strikes ====
Nationwide strikes were conducted by businesses, stores, cafes, and workers as well as by online shops and social media influencers.

==== Demonstrations ====
Protests took the form of street demonstrations, chanting slogans, car honking, lighting fires, and removing surveillance cameras. To avoid being identified and later arrested, many protesters wore masks and dark clothes, reminiscent of V for Vendetta. In some cases, when the street lights were turned off by the authorities, the protesters set off fireworks and lit the area using their smartphones.

==== Slogans and symbols ====
During the protests, several notable slogans were chanted by demonstrators, reflecting anti-government sentiments, calls for the restoration of the monarchy, and unity among protesters. These slogans were frequently documented in videos and reports by Persian-language media outlets such as Manoto and Iran International. Many drew on historical references to the Pahlavi dynasty, while others directly targeted Supreme Leader Ali Khamenei or the Islamic Republic's leadership. Symbols associated with the protests included the Lion and Sun flag, which was waved in several demonstrations as a sign of monarchist aspirations and opposition to the government. On 9 January 2026, X changed the Iran flag emoji from the Islamic Republic flag to the modern design of the Lion and Sun flag.

- "Death to the Dictator" (Persian: مرگ بر دیکتاتور, romanised: Marg bar Diktâtor) — a general anti-authoritarian chant targeting the government's leadership, reported in Tehran, Isfahan, Kermanshah, Malard, Nahavand, Noorabad, and Karaj. (Note: Attributed to multiple sources:)
- "Death to Khamenei" (Persian: مرگ بر خامنه‌ای, romanised: Marg bar Khâmene'i) — direct call against former supreme leader Ali Khamenei and current supreme leader Mojtaba Khamenei, heard in Isfahan, Farsan, Arak, and other protest sites. Previously used during the 2021–2022 and 2022–2023 protests. (Note: Attributed to multiple sources:)
- "Death to Mojtaba" (Persian: مرگ بر مجتبی, romanised: Marg bar Mojtabâ) — direct call against supreme leader Mojtaba Khamenei, heard from the windows of homes in Tehran.
- "Javid Shah" (Persian: جاوید شاه, romanised: Jâvid Shâh, lit. 'Long live the Shah') — repeated chants calling for the return of the monarchy, heard in Hamadan, Arak, Nahavand, Dehloran, and many other cities during nighttime protests. (Note: Attributed to multiple sources:)
- "This is the final battle, Pahlavi will return" (Persian: این آخرین نبرده، پهلوی برمی‌گرده, romanised: In âkharin nabarde, Pahlavi barmigarde) — a phrase conveying determination for regime change and the return of the Pahlavi family, chanted in Arak, Rasht, Khorramabad, Isfahan, Nahavand, and Dorud. (Note: Attributed to multiple sources:)
- "Neither Gaza nor Lebanon, My Life for Iran" (Persian: نه غزه نه لبنان، جانم فدای ایران, romanised: Na Qazze na Lobnan, jânam fadâ-ye Irân) — a chant that expresses the opposition of some Iranians to the Islamic Republic's military, financial, and political support for Palestinian militant groups, neglecting the needs and interests of Iran itself.
- "Reza Shah, bless your soul" (Persian: رضا شاه، روحت شاد, romanised: Rezâ Shâh, ruhat shâd) — a slogan honouring Reza Shah Pahlavi, founder of the Pahlavi dynasty, chanted in Hamadan, Tehran, Isfahan, Kermanshah, and other locations.
- "Don't be afraid, don't be afraid, we are all together" (Persian: نترسید، نترسید، ما همه با هم هستیم, romanised: Natarsid, natarsid, mâ hame bâ ham hastim) — a chant promoting unity and courage among protesters, chanted during nighttime gatherings in Isfahan.
- "Dishonourable, dishonourable" (Persian: بی‌شرف، بی‌شرف, romanised: Bi-sharaf, bi-sharaf) — directed at security forces or government officials.
- "Freedom, freedom, freedom" (Persian: آزادی، آزادی، آزادی, romanised: Āzādi, āzādi, āzādi).
- "The Shah is coming home, Zahhak is overthrown" (Persian: شاه می‌یاد به خونه، ضحاک سرنگونه, romanised: Shâh mi-yâd be khune, Zahâk sarnegune) — referencing Persian mythology (Zahhak as a tyrant) to symbolise the overthrow of the current government and return of the Shah.
- "Death to the oppressor, whether Shah or Rahbar" (Persian: مرگ بر ستمگر، چه شاه باشد چه رهبر, romanised: Marg bar setamgar, che shah bashad che rahbar) — a general anti-Islamic Republic and anti-monarchy chant mainly by expressed by supporters of the National Council of Resistance of Iran (NCRI).

==== Organisation ====
As of 7 January, HRANA viewed the protests as being networked. The Associated Press viewed the first steps of protests as "broadly leaderless" before 8 January, and described Reza Pahlavi's influence after the call for demonstration on 8 January as unclear; however, when the time clocked at 8 p.m., chanting broke out across Tehran, with crowds shouting anti-government slogans and expressing support for the shah's return. IranWire viewed Generation Z Iranians as "one of the most visible and active groups" in the 2025–2026 protests, whose political views were strongly impacted by the Mahsa Amini protests of 2022–2023.

== Government suppression methods ==
=== Internet blackouts ===
On 8 January 2026, the government imposed significant restrictions on telephone and internet access to limit communication and the dissemination of information. Unlike the Twelve-Day War, there has not been an official internet shut down nationwide. However, connectivity was heavily disrupted in cities experiencing active demonstrations, making it difficult for citizens to send messages, share media, or organise further protests. These measures were widely seen as part of the authorities' efforts to suppress dissent and control the narrative around the unrest.

The next day, on 9 January, it was reported by multiple media outlets that Iran, in a largely unprecedented measure, had activated military-grade jammers to disrupt civilian Starlink signals. Initially, only 30 percent of the media traffic was affected but it rose to 80 percent within several hours. However, from the morning after the blackout began, Islamic Republic authorities issued a "white list" which allowed government affiliated institutions and accounts limited access to the internet, included were government aligned media and Telegram channels, as well as some universities. Forbes quoted VPN expert Simon Migliano as saying that "Iran's current nationwide blackout is a blunt instrument intended to crush dissent." Migliano also addressed the cost of the internet shutdown, saying "this 'kill switch' approach comes at a staggering price, draining $1.56 million from Iran's economy every single hour the internet is down." By 11 January, Iran shut down the Starlink internet for the first time.

Thereafter, security forces started door-to-door operations, seizing satellite dishes amid the blackout to block any external access. On 14 January, reports emerged that the government was finalising their internet kill switch project, which was intended to cut the nation completely off from the global internet for extended periods; this plan was being coordinated with Huawei and China. By 16 January, after more than 200 hours of the blackout, NetBlocks reported a very slight internet connectivity uptick at 2%. Reports also indicated that the government was planning on permanently cutting internet access, with only vetted individuals being permitted filtered and censored access. On 17 January, it was reported that CCTV footage was being confiscated, and checkpoints were set up to detain citizens found with protest images on their phones. On 18 January, Meta began hiding the Instagram followers of Iranian residents after reports indicated that Iranian security bodies were extracting large volumes of user data. After targeting Iranians abroad with cybersecurity threats and phishing scams, it was reported on 19 January that the Iran-linked "Handala Hack" group was routing attacks via Starlink.

On 20 January, it was reported by an investigative watchdog that pro-government editors were active during the crackdown across Wikipedia and other services in deleting content and sanitising articles related to the Islamic Republic's human rights record. The same day, it was also reported that Iranian authorities claimed they had cut off 40,000 Starlink satellite internet connections during the internet blackout. On 21 January, it was reported that the Islamic Republic was working on a state-run intranet amid the ongoing blackout, similar to that of North Korea. On 23 January, NetBlocks reported the blackout was entering its third week while the Iranian government was attempting to generate false traffic in order to manufacture the narrative of a wider restoration and normalcy. During the blackout, Iranian diaspora internet users ran applications to share part of their bandwidth in an attempt to help users inside Iran circumvent the blackout. Separately, an independent research group stated the Islamic Republic had coordinated a large social media influence operation aimed at shaping global narratives. The Guardian also reported the Islamic Republic used Chinese technology during the internet blackout and suppression of protests, such as facial recognition and surveillance tools.

=== Recruitment of foreign militias ===
The presence of state-sponsored foreign Shia militias, namely the Iraqi Popular Mobilisation Forces, Arabic-speaking mercenaries, Lebanese Hezbollah, the Pakistani Liwa Zainabiyoun, and the Afghan Liwa Fatemiyoun, in suppressing protests was reported. Iran International reported that on 2 January 2026, Iraqi militias affiliated with the Iranian government recruited forces to assist Iranian security forces in suppressing protests in Iran. On 6 January 2026, it was reported that approximately 800 members of Iraqi Shia militia groups, including Kata'ib Hezbollah, Harakat al-Nujaba, Sayyid al-Shuhada, and the Badr Organisation had been sent to Iran. The troops were reportedly transported through the border crossings of Shalamcheh, Chazabeh, and Khosravi, officially under the cover of a "pilgrimage to the holy sites of Imam Reza in Mashhad", while in practice they were gathered at a base in Ahvaz before being dispatched to various regions to assist in suppressing protests.

Roni Insaz, a former member of the Islamic Revolutionary Guard Corps, in his interview with The Jerusalem Post, explained "It's very difficult for Iranian forces to kill Iranians, because they are the same people," and added that loyal militias from Syria, Lebanon, Afghanistan, and Pakistan have participated for firing at the protestors. According to Iran International, "The reason behind this move by the Islamic Republic could be its concern that the Iranian police might not follow orders to attack unarmed, ordinary people, or simply because its forces are insufficient to stop protests in more than 100 cities".

On 9 January 2026 the United States warned Iran against using foreign militias to crush protests. According to The Media Line, Iraqi Shiite militia members were recruited to help suppress Iranian protesters, receiving $600 each. By 11 January, more than 60 buses, each carrying about 50 people, had crossed the Iraq‑Iran border. On 14 January, a source told IHRNGO that the security forces in the Kurdish regions of Iran during the killings did not speak Persian, while in Karaj, an eyewitness said the forces spoke Arabic and took selfies with the bodies. On 15 January, an Iraqi source stated to CNN that "nearly 5,000" fighters from Iraqi militias had crossed into Iran over the preceding weeks.

=== Internal propaganda and coercion ===
The Iranian government has been accused of using footage of protesters' bodies in morgues to demoralise future protests. Families trying to receive the bodies of their loved ones have oftentimes been forced to pay compensation for the bullets that killed their relatives. Reports stated that security forces and Revolutionary Guard members raided and intimidated the families of protesters who were killed, imposed restrictions on the retrieval and burial of bodies, and warned that families would be charged fees. There have been reports that families were unable to locate the remains of their relatives after authorities secretly buried them in locations far from where the deaths occurred. Reports have also indicated that the authorities retained the remains until families consented to official accounts describing the deceased as aligned with the government and Basij rather than as protesters. Likewise, images and videos from the pro-government rallies were reported to have been altered. HRANA also reported cases of forced confessions being broadcast. Furthermore, doctors and healthcare workers were reported to have been arrested or disappeared for providing medical care to protesters or documenting their injuries. The Islamic Republic also pressured families of detainees to attend pro-government rallies planned for 22 Bahman (11 February), marking the anniversary of the 1979 Islamic Revolution, telling them that only if they complied and attended would their detained relatives be spared execution or have their sentences reduced.

=== Direct order for live fire on protesters and killing of hospitalised protesters ===
Sources close to Iran's Supreme National Security Council and the presidential office report that the killing of protesters was carried out on the direct order of Supreme Leader Ali Khamenei, with full approval from senior state officials. The council allegedly authorised live fire, which was executed mainly by the IRGC in what is described as a deliberate, organised operation exceptional in scale and intensity.

On 13 January, The Guardian reported that Islamic Republic security forces were documented using shotguns and rifles with live ammunition, as well as heavy DShK machine guns against protesters, with a Tehran doctor stating that security forces were "shooting to kill". Further reports also indicated the security forces used snipers and knives to attack protesters. A spokesperson from the Abdorrahman Boroumand Centre for Human Rights cited evidence that even when using "less lethal" weapons, security forces were deliberately shooting at the heads, eyes, genitals and vital organs of the protesters, so as to terrorise protesters by mutilating them and causing them permanent disability, reusing the tactic employed in the 2022 Mahsa Amini protests. At least one young girl had been shot in the pelvic area and was in critical condition. A medic in Tehran reported that there were "direct shots to the heads of the young people, to their hearts as well."

Additionally, multiple testimonies have revealed Iranian security forces raiding hospitals to arrest, and in many cases execute, hospitalised protesters. On 4 January, according to Namdar Baghaei Yazdi, vice president of the Iranian Medical Society UK, security forces in full riot gear stormed Imam Khomeini Hospital in Ilam, attacked medical personnel with tear gas and shotgun pellets, and arrested injured protesters, with another similar assault being carried out by security forces on 6 January in Sina Hospital in Tehran. Yazdi was quoted as saying "Hospitals are no longer sacred in Iran, and we are very concerned for our medical colleagues there who are already at risk from the regime." A doctor from southern Iran reported that security forces had "finished off" protesters who had been hospitalised at the time, further stating "they killed many, arrested many, and many are on the run. The situation is very bad." According to The Times, another doctor from Tehran stated that security forces had "gone into hospitals and forcibly taken the corpses of protesters with them", and some of the wounded protesters treat their injuries at home and avoid being admitted to the hospital out of fear of being arrested. Iran Human Rights reported that in Rasht, security forces surrounded and trapped protesters inside the Rasht Bazaar, set it on fire, and killed people attempting to surrender or escape, while also "finishing off" wounded survivors in the streets and in hospitals.

=== Chemical substances ===
On 17 January, reports indicated the Iranian government may have used toxic chemical substances against protesters. Footage showed security forces atop vehicles wearing hazmat suits and masks designed for hazardous chemical materials. Some victims reportedly died several days after exposure rather than immediately. On 18 January, it was reported that the detained protesters were being injected with unknown substances while in custody. On 23 January, chemical gas was reported to have been used on the crowds of protesters and escape routes, causing severe breathing problems, burning pain of the eyes, skin and lungs, vomiting blood, and sudden weakness and loss of movement. On 1 February, it was reported that the unknown substances that were being forcibly injected into the detainees had been linked to multiple deaths in custody.

=== Mosques Used by Security Forces ===
Iranian security forces reportedly used mosques across Tehran as bases during the crackdown. Intercepted communications, footage and eyewitness accounts indicate that some mosques were used to deploy forces, monitor crowd and fire from rooftops. Some witnesses also alleged that security personnel damaged or set fire to mosques, potentially allowing authorities to blame protesters for the damage.

=== Concealment of deaths through mass graves and burials ===
On 27 January, The Guardian reported that the Islamic Republic was concealing protest deaths through mass graves and burials.

=== Persecution and executions ===
On 5 January 2026, Gholamhossein Mohseni Ejei, head of the judiciary in the Islamic Republic, stated that there would be no leniency for "rioters" despite the right to demonstrate, and the judiciary's Mizan news agency quoted him saying "I instruct the attorney general and prosecutors across the country to act in accordance with the law and with resolve against the rioters and those who support them (...) and to show no leniency or indulgence", and stressing that the penalty would be "decisive" and "maximum". Regarding the rapid trials and executions or protesters, Iran state television shared a video in which Mohseni-Ejei said "If we want to do a job, we should do it now. If we want to do something, we have to do it quickly, if it becomes late, two months, three months later, it doesn't have the same effect. If we want to do something, we have to do that fast." On 10 January, Supreme Leader Ali Khamenei said that the demands of protesters in the country are "completely fair", but "rioters" should "be put in their place." On 13 January, in a televised statement from the office of the Tehran prosecutor, the office declared that an undeclared number of protesters would be charged with "moharebeh", or "waging war against God", an offence punished by death in Iran, and used extensively in the past by the Iranian judiciary. According to the Human Rights Activists News Agency, as of 14 January 2026, over 18,400 people had been arrested. By 18 January, HRANA reported that 24,669 protesters had been detained.

According to Iran International, on 10 January 2026 the "One Word" lawyers' network, citing the internet shutdown isolating protesters from the outside world, called on the international community and Iranian judges to prevent the show trials and extrajudicial executions of protesters following the orders of Ali Khamenei and senior judicial officials. In its statement, the network detailed new orders from Khamenei instructing security forces "to deal harshly with protesters in recent gatherings" as well as separate statements from the Head of the Judiciary, the Attorney General of the country, and the Tehran Prosecutor calling for "extraordinary, out-of-order proceedings and the imposition of the most severe punishments in the cases of detained protesters."

On 8 February 2026, chief judiciary, Gholamhossein Mohseni Ejei stated that detained individuals who had participated in the protests would be removed from the list of pardons commonly issued on the anniversary of the Iranian Revolution.

Executions of individuals allegedly involved in the protests continued during the 2026 Iran war. The Guardian reported on 2 March 2026 that the Iranian government has persisted in persecuting political prisoners and protest detainees, with hundreds reportedly executed or at risk of execution. Some people experience prolonged solitary confinement, torture, mock executions, and forced confessions, without access to lawyers. Executions during this period included those convicted of moharebeh, armed rebellion, or membership in opposition groups, with specific cases reported in March 2026. Families have frequently received little or contradictory information about their relatives' whereabouts. Meanwhile human rights groups note that the ongoing war has overshadowed these abuses even as the regime carries out death sentences and other severe punishments.

On 1 April 2026, Iran's judiciary executed Amirhossein Hatami, a detainee convicted in connection with a fire at the "185 Mahmoud Kaveh" Basij base in Tehran during the protests. Reports indicate that he and other detainees were allegedly pushed into the base by armed individuals, after which the fire occurred, placing them at immediate risk.

==== Torture and sexual violence ====
On 18 January, The Guardian reported that a human rights group claimed detainees were subjected to torture and sexual assault while in custody. Iran International also reported detainees were being injected with unknown chemical substances. Reports from KHRN (a French-based human rights organisation) cited by Iran International, claimed that two protesters were abused while in detention during Iran's nationwide unrest in the city of Kermanshah. One of those detained was a minor. According to these accounts, security personnel subjected the detainees to sexualised physical mistreatment during their transfer, including beatings and the use of batons through their clothing and over their anal areas. Reports also stated imprisoned protesters were being tortured and raped, while women's bodies were being returned to their families with missing wombs in order to hide the crimes.

== Casualties ==
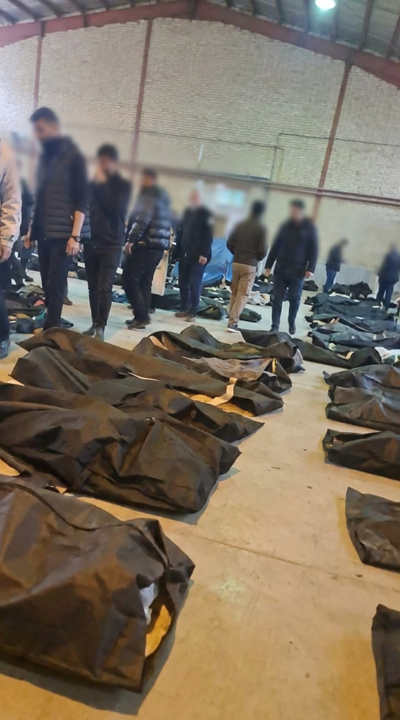
Body bags of victims of the massacres.

Reporting on casualties from the 2026 protests has varied widely, from several thousand to around 30,000 deaths, with figures difficult to verify due to media restrictions and the prolonged internet shutdown. Iran's Supreme Leader Ali Khamenei said that "several thousand" people had been killed, while attributing the violence to protesters. Independent and foreign media, citing medical professionals, human rights groups, and leaked hospital data, have reported substantially higher figures. On 17 January, The Sunday Times reported that a network of Iranian doctors estimated between 16,500 and 18,000 deaths and hundreds of thousands of injuries; one doctor quoted in the report described the killings as genocide. On 21 January, the Iranian government issued a death toll of 3,117 people, of which 2,427 were "civilians and security forces", according to Associated Press, which described the Iranian government as having a track record of undercounting deaths during protests.

=== Casualties, arrests, executions, and injured protesters ===
Human Rights Watch reported that the Iranian government has been carrying out arbitrary arrests of tens of thousands of protesters, and has subjected them to torture and mistreatments.

==== 31 December ====
On 31 December 2025, during a protest in Fuladshahr, Dariush Ansari Bakhtiariwand was shot with a Kalashnikov rifle by security forces. He died before reaching medical care. While participating in a protest in Kuhdasht on 31 December, Amirhesam Khodayarifard (reported to be 21, or 22 years old) was shot dead with a bullet to the head by a plainclothes retired IRGC agent. Eyewitness testimony and video evidence showed that Khodayarifard was among the protesters. Government media stated that protesters had been throwing rocks at security forces, and that Khodayarafid was killed after the rocks had been thrown.

Governmental media, including Mehr News Agency, claimed that Khodayarifard was a member of the Basij. The governor of Kuhdasht, an Imam of Friday Prayer, and Islamic Revolutionary Guard Corps (IRGC) members visited Khodayarifard's family. Permission for the family to access Khodayarifard's body and carry out a burial was conditioned on the family making a televised statement stating that Khodayarifard had been a member of the Basij. Governmental authorities gave warnings on Telegram and Instagram forbidding the publication of information about Khodayarifard's killing. As of 5 January 2026, the authorities, who were pressuring Khodayarifard's family to state that he was a Basij member, had not given the body to Khodayarifard's family, according to IranWire.

==== 1 January ====
Two protesters, Ahmad Jalil, 21, and Sajjad Valamanesh, 28, were killed in Lordegan on 1 January 2026. Both had been shot by security forces and died later from their injuries. On the evening of 1 January, two men and a teenage boy, Shayan Asadollahi, 30, Vahab Musavi, and Mostafa, 15, residents of Azna (in Lorestan province) were killed by gunfire from security forces. The IRGC-aligned Fars News Agency stated that the protesters had either tried to attack a police station or had tried to disarm the security forces. Ahmadreza Amani, 28, was shot in the chest by security forces at around 18:00 IRST in Azna and died in hospital.

Khodadad Shirvani, 33, a Marvdasht resident, was shot with shotgun pellets by security forces on the same evening in Marvdasht. He died after being transferred to a hospital. In Nurabad (Lorestan province), Ahad Ebrahimpour Abdoli, 35, was lethally shot the same evening with three bullets (one to his heart) by security forces during a protest in Ba'ath Square in Nurabad. Security forces and the Imam of Friday Prayer pressured Abdoli's family to say that he was a Basij member and that he had been shot by "enemy forces".

==== 2 January ====
On 2 January, a 42-year-old protester, Ali Azizi Jafarabadi, a Kurdish man from Harsin County was shot dead by security forces in Harsin.

==== 3 January ====
On 3 January, the total number of arrested protesters had increased to 132 according to Hengaw or 582 according to HRANA. Iran International estimated the death count of protesters to be at least eight, the number of locations to be 113 locations in 46 cities across 22 provinces, with at least 44 people shot and wounded by live ammunition or pellet guns fired by Iranian security forces. Four protesters were shot dead with "military-grade" weapons by IRGC members at protests in Malekshahi County in Ilam province; forty were injured and many taken to hospital.

==== 4 January ====
By the early morning of 4 January, Iran International reported the death toll from the protests to have risen to at least 16. HRANA estimated that since the beginning of the protests there had been 990 arrests and 51 cases of injuries to protesters, mostly from pellet and plastic bullets.

==== 5 January ====
The total number of arrested protesters rose to 1,200 on 5 January. Iranian authorities claimed to have arrested a Mossad agent partaking in the protests, with the agent allegedly confessed to being recruited, trained by, and continuing communication with Mossad, and said that Mossad handlers told him to go to people's residences, but was later instructed to move his "operations" to local marketplaces.

==== 6 January ====
On 6 January, a total of 2,076 protesters had been arrested, and at least 34 protesters and 2 police officers had been killed, according to HRANA.

==== 7 January ====
HRANA estimated 140 new arrests of protesters or identifications of previously arrested protesters, making a total of 2,217, including 165 minors and 46 university students. HRANA counted at total since the beginning of the protests as 38 deaths, including 29 adult protesters, 5 minor protesters, and 4 security officers.

==== 8 January ====
According to reports, a massacre occurred in Fardis on 8 January 2026, where troops reportedly killed 50 protesters with a machine gun.

==== 9 January ====
On 9 January, HRANA estimated that a total of 2,311 protesters had been arrested and at least 65 were dead. Time reported that they were in contact with a Tehran-based doctor who informed them that over 217 protester deaths had been recorded across six hospitals in the city, while Iranian Nobel Peace Prize laureate Shirin Ebadi warned that authorities might carry out a massacre under the cover of the widespread internet blackout. Reports from two hospitals in Rasht and Tehran indicate overall 110 dead bodies being transferred to these two hospitals during 8 and 9 January. Some wounded people had military-grade bullets in head and neck, indicating that the shootings were intended to kill.

==== 10 January ====
Amidst the internet blackout during the protests, Iran International stated their most conservative estimates indicated that at least 2,000 people had been killed by government forces over the past 48 hours alone. On 10 January, HRANA estimated that 2,638 protesters had been arrested and confirmed that 116 fatalities had occurred. The Centre for Human Rights in Iran warned that a "massacre is unfolding." It said hundreds of protesters had been killed since the government cut off internet access, and security forces, as in the past, shot people in the eyes with metal pellets and rubber bullets. It reported that hospitals were overwhelmed, and that casualties continue to rise.

Iranian state media reported that Artesh First Lieutenant Amin Salimi was shot and killed "while on mission" in Khavaran neighbourhood, eastern Tehran. US-based human rights activists acknowledged his death on 20 January.

==== 11 January ====
According to a US-based rights group, more than 500 people have been killed in Iran's protests, with 579 additional deaths under investigation (raising the total to 1,123), while over 10,681 people have been arrested. The People's Mojahedin Organisation of Iran reported that more than 3,000 people had been killed in the protests by 11 January. Their figures, based on local sources, hospitals, and families, show the government even displayed some bodies on state TV, falsely blaming protesters for their deaths. By 11 January, Time reported that, starting with reports from a handful of Tehran hospitals, an informal, expatriate group of academics and professionals calculated that protester deaths could have reached 6,000 through Saturday the 10th.

==== 12 January ====
On 12 January, CNN reported that given the government's internet shutdown and the slow trickle of information emerging from Iran, the full scale of casualties remains unclear.

==== 13 January ====
On 13 January, Iran International reported that at least 12,000 people had been killed, describing the massacre as the "largest killing in Iranian contemporary history". CBS News reported that activist groups in Iran estimated 12,000 people to have been killed, and possibly 20,000, based on medical reports.

==== 15 January ====
By 15 January, fatality reports saw a significant increase as minimal internet connectivity was restored. While confirmed figures from HRANA stood at approximately 2,000-2,500 deaths, other rights organisations such as Iran Human Rights (IHR) reported at least 3,428 fatalities. At the same time, leaked internal documents from the Supreme National Security Council and the presidential office, reported by Iran International, suggested that as many as 12,000 people may have been killed during the peak crackdown between 8 and 10 January. CBS News cited sources within Iran claiming the total death toll could potentially reach 20,000.

==== 17 January ====
On 17 January, The Sunday Times reported that "at least 16,500-18,000" people had been killed, and 330,000 had been injured.

==== 18 January ====
On 18 January, HRANA stated that 24,669 protesters had been detained, at least 25 children under 18 years of age had been killed during the protests, and 145 forced confessions had been broadcast. The U.S.-based Human Rights Activists News Agency (HRANA) added that 3,919 people were verified to have been killed during the protests, and a further 8,949 additional deaths were still under investigation. The Guardian reported claims that detainees were being subjected to torture and sexual assault while in custody; Iran International reported detainees were being injected with unknown chemical substances.

==== 20 January ====
On 20 January, the Canadian-based International Centre for Human Rights reported that at least 43,000 had been killed by Islamic Republic agents, over 350,000 injured, and over 10,000 blinded in a similar tactic from the 2022 protests. According to the report, more than 95% of the victims were killed on 8 and 9 January amid the internet blackout.

==== 22 January ====
On 22 January, Iranian state media released its first official casualty figures related to the protests, reporting that 3,117 people had been killed. The announcement stated that the dead included both civilians and members of the security forces, but provided no detailed breakdown or methodology for how the figures were compiled.

Independent human rights organisations challenged the official casualty figures. HRANA reported that the death toll had surpassed 4,900, based on information compiled from hospital records, eyewitness testimony, and regional monitoring networks, and warned that the true number of fatalities was likely higher due to severe reporting constraints. HRANA later updated its data to state that the verified total had reached at least 4,519 confirmed deaths with an additional 9,049 cases under review.

On the same day, the United Nations Special Rapporteur on Human Rights in Iran stated the number of civilians killed may exceeded 20,000, citing information received from civil society sources and the cumulative scale of the crackdown. Separately, the U.S. television network NewsNation reported substantially higher estimates, suggesting the death toll could be closer to 30,000.

HRANA, alongside other journalists and independent analysts emphasised that discrepancies between official and independent casualty figures were driven in part by near-total internet shutdowns, restricted information flows, limits on foreign media access, and security pressure on local reporters. These conditions, including arrests and intimidation of journalists, significantly hindered the ability of independent monitors to document fatalities comprehensively and to verify casualty data during the protests.

==== 24 January ====
The HRANA total death count estimate, including both verified cases and deaths under investigation, grew above 20,000 on 24 January, with counts of 5,149 adult protesters, 60 minors, 208 security force members, 42 non-participants, and 17,031 deaths under investigation, making 22,490 in total. HRANA stated that the overall level of repression was unprecedented, with a cumulative number of 205 broadcast false confessions and the total number of arrests reaching 40,887.

==== 25 January ====
On 25 January, Time reported the 8 and 9 January protest-related death toll as 30,304 from hospital records, according to Amir Parasta, a doctor, excluding military hospital records, bodies in morgues, and places not included in the analysis. Time also stated that two senior health officials said that the death toll "could have been" 30,000, and that Time could not independently verify the two health officials' estimate.

The same day, Iran International reported more than 36,500 were killed by security forces on 8 and 9 January, based on documents reviewed by Iran International's editorial board, as well as field reports and accounts from medical staff and victims' families.

==== 27 January ====
The Guardian reported that the Islamic Republic was concealing protest deaths through mass graves and burials.

==== February ====
Arrests in relation to the protests continued in early February. Arrests of three politicians, Azar Mansouri, Ebrahim Asgharzadeh, and former Deputy Foreign Minister Mohsen Aminzadeh, were announced on 8 February. Reports also emerged in February about the detention of Shin-Nosuke Kawashima, the head of the NHK office in Tehran, and his transfer to Evin Prison. The government of Japan confirmed the detention of one of its citizens in Tehran and stated that Tokyo authorities were in contact with the detainee and his family, demanding his swift release. Iranian officials have not yet officially confirmed the arrest. NHK stated that the safety of its staff is a priority, and no further information has been provided on the matter.

==== March ====
Amid the Iran war and the ongoing internet blackout, 466 people were arrested in Iran on 24 March for their online activities, with over 1,000 arrests having been made over the course of the month since the start of the war, pertaining to individuals accused of "filming sensitive locations", "sharing anti-government content online", or "cooperating with the enemy".

==== Executions ====
According to an HRANA report on 16 January, Iran carried out at least 52 executions during the protests between 5 and 14 January. On 21 January, HRANA further added that at least 313 prisoners were executed during the time of the protests.

On 12 January 2026, it was reported that 26-year-old protester, Erfan Soltani, was sentenced to be executed on 14 January, making him one of the first of these protesters to be handed an execution sentence. Soltani was arrested during protests in Fardis on 8 January. Human rights groups and activists reported that Soltani was denied access to a lawyer, a fair trial, or any opportunity to appeal. Several days later, Soltani was notified that he was to face execution on 14 January, less than a week after his arrest. Shortly before the execution date, Iranian Foreign Minister Abbas Araghchi denied any plans to hang people, and Soltani's family was notified that his execution had been postponed, while the judiciary stated that the charges against him only consisted of "colluding against national security" and "propaganda activities against the establishment" which are not punishable by death in Iran. The state broadcasting company IRIB said that reports of Soltani's pending execution were a "blatant act of news fabrication." According to Human Rights Organisation Hangaw, Soltani met with his family on 16 January and was reported to be in good health. By 2 February, it was reported that Soltani had been released on bail.

On 16 January, U.S. president Donald Trump thanked the government for promising to stop 800 planned executions; however, Ali Salehi, the State Prosecutor in Tehran was seen on state television saying: "Trump says a lot of nonsense and gibberish", and "Our reaction will be forceful, preventive and swift. Indictments have been issued for numerous cases and sent to courts." Iran's judiciary chief, Gholamhossein Mohseni Ejei, stated that carrying out the sentences quickly would serve as a deterrent. On 19 January 2026, UN rights chief Volker Türk claimed in a statement that Iran was using executions "as a tool of state intimidation". During 2025, 1,500 people had been executed in Iran. The number of executions in 2025 was second only to China.

On 17 January, another protester, a 19-year-old Amirhossein Ghaderzadeh, was sentenced to death by hanging, with his execution scheduled for 21 January.

On 20 January, reports circulated that the Iran Human Rights Society (IHRS) said that an Iranian conscript named Javid Khales had been sentenced to death after refusing an order to fire on protesters and that he was being held in Isfahan Prison, though this has not been independently verified.

On 22 January, 33-year-old Ali Rahbar was reportedly executed in Mashhad, becoming one of the first protesters to be executed. Iran's judiciary denied his execution having taken place, stating that such a person had not even been detained.

According to activists, human rights advocates, and foreign intelligence, the Islamic Republic secretly executed jailed protesters while disguising the deaths as protest casualties and suicides. There were also reports of detainees being injected with unknown substances, leading to their deaths.

On 6 February, The Independent reported that secret executions of detained protesters had taken place in Tehran, Isfahan, Shiraz, and Mashhad, and that mass executions were being planned by the Islamic Republic once negotiations with the United States ended. On 9 February, it was reported that the Islamic Republic was pressuring the families of detainees to attend pro-government rallies planned for 22 Bahman (11 February), marking the anniversary of the 1979 Islamic Revolution, telling them that only if they complied and attended would their detained relatives be spared execution or have their sentences reduced.

On 16 February, it was reported that the Islamic Republic had issued death sentences for at least sixteen detained protesters, with multiple detainees stating they had been tortured and were compelled to sign forced confessions. Norway-based rights group Hengaw stated the cases are marred by due process violations. HRANA stated on 15 February, that 53,552 had been arrested, while Iran International added that many are facing serious charges.

Reports also indicated detained protesters were being brutally tortured and raped before being killed in prison, including women's bodies being returned to their families with missing wombs in order to hide the crimes.

On 19 March, three more protesters were executed, including teenage wrestler Saleh Mohammadi. On 2 April, another protester, 18-year-old Amir Hossein Hatami, was executed. On 5 April, two more protesters were executed.

On 13 May, one man was executed after being accused of killing a police officer during the protests. According to HRANA, the regime didn't allow him access to an independent lawyer.

According to Amnesty International, as of 26 May, "At least 78 protesters, dissidents and others with real or perceived links to banned opposition groups are under sentence of death and at risk of execution." In August 2026, Euronews reported that Iran executed a foreign national named Qaim Hosseini; he was accused of taking part in anti-government protests on 8 January in Isfahan.

=== Government forces ===
Government authorities repeatedly presented fatalities during the protests as members of the security forces killed by protesters, after which evidence from witnesses and family statements showed that the victim had been shot by the security forces. Government media claimed that Amirhesam Khodayarifard, killed on 31 December, was a member of the Basij. Eyewitness reports and video evidence, collected by Hengaw, contradicted this claim, in particular showing that he was standing among the protesters and was killed by a shot to the head by a security forces member. Initially, authorities conditioned family access to Khodayarifard's body on the family making a televised statement that he was a Basij member. During the funeral, which took place on 2 January, Khodayarifard's father confirmed that his son was not a Basij member.

On 3 January, Agence France-Presse referred to a statement by Mehr that IRGC member Latif Karimi was killed during clashes in Malekshahi County, during which four protesters were killed by the IRGC. On 4 January, eyewitnesses and other sources clarified that Karimi was present among the protesters when he was shot by IRGC members, and died in Imam Khomeini Hospital in Ilam. Karimi was a retired brigadier-general by profession. Karimi's son stated on Telegram, "My father's only 'crime' was telling [the government security forces] not to shoot at the people."

On 7 January, militants of the Baloch nationalist militant organisation People's Fighters Front (PFF) assassinated Mahmoud Haqiqat, the police chief of Iranshahr. IRGC-affiliated media reported that protesters killed two Law Enforcement Command officers during protests in Lordegan as well as an unspecified security force member in Malekshahi.

On 8 January, Norway-based human rights organisation Hengaw claimed that two IRGC Ground Forces members were killed during the protests in Kermanshah. A police officer in Malard County at the Tehran province was killed from a stabbing after attempts to control local unrest.

On 9 January, opposition media reported that clashes between protesters and security forces in Kermanshah Province killed at least 10 IRGC Ground Forces Nabi Akram Unit members.

On 11 January, fighters from the PFF killed one Law Enforcement Command officer and injured another in an attack on an LEC patrol vehicle in Dashtiari County, Sistan and Baluchistan Province.

On 17 March, Iran International reported that security forces were beginning to grow frustrated with the system with some signs of defections.

=== Notable victims ===
- Shahram Maghsoudi, powerlifting champion
- Mojtaba Tarshiz, former professional footballer
- Salar Behdari, goalkeeper in the Persian Gulf Pro League for Aluminium Arak F.C.
- Mohammad Hajipour, former goalkeeper for the Iran national beach soccer team
- Ahmad Ramezanzadeh, catcher for the Iran national baseball team
- Sara Behboudi, mountaineer
- Sahba Rashtian, women's football assistant referee
- Hassan Ghasemi, karate champion and referee
- Arshia Ahmadpour, boxer
- Saleh Mohammadi, wrestler

=== Foreign victims ===
Canadian foreign minister Anita Anand confirmed that a Canadian citizen was killed by the Islamic Republic forces during the protests. Several Afghan migrants were also among those killed in the protests.

== Reactions ==
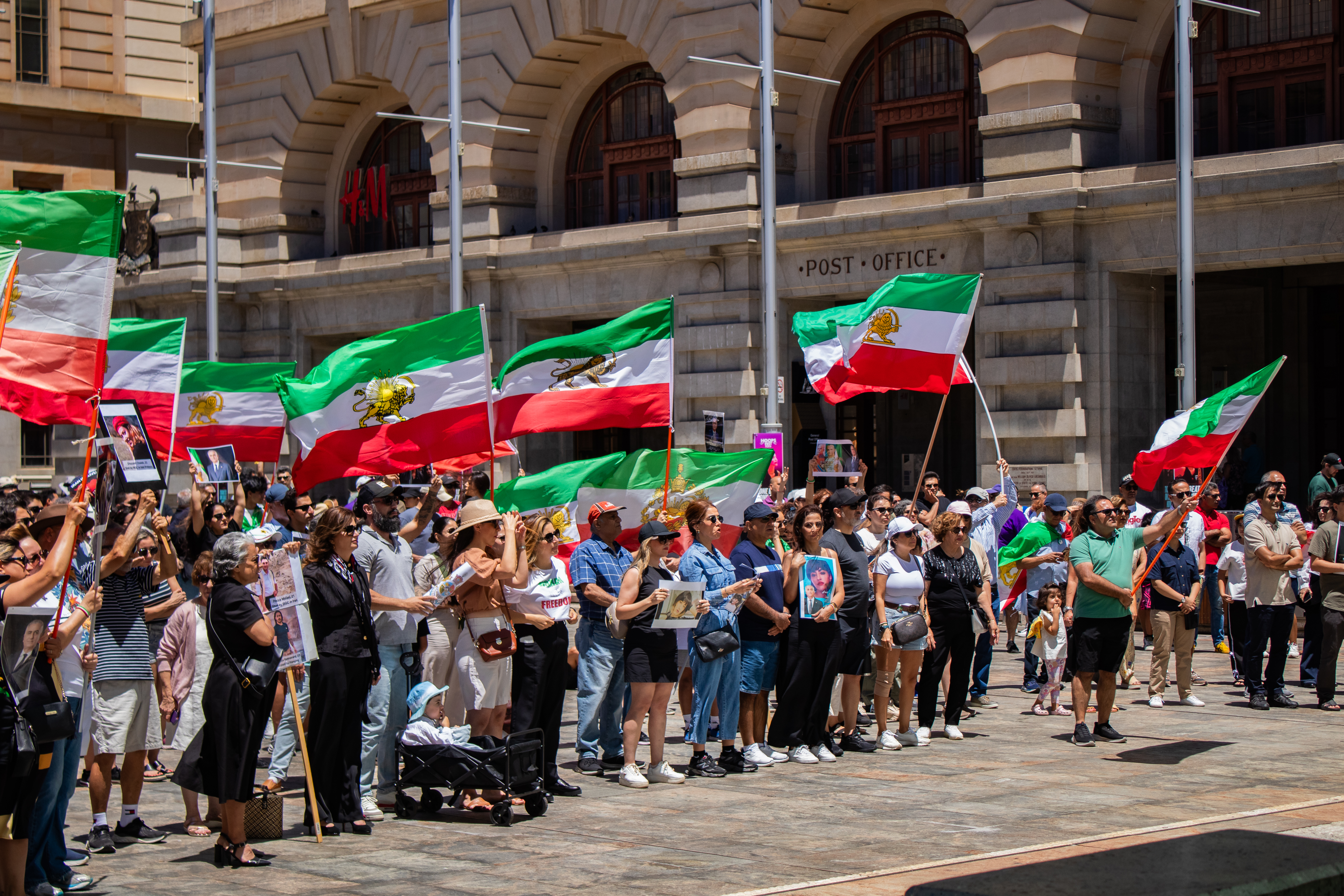
Iranian diaspora holding a solidarity rally in Perth, Australia, on 10 January 2026 against the Islamic Republic

Reactions to the protests ranged from calls for dialogue and economic relief to warnings of force:

=== Domestic ===
Supreme Leader Ali Khamenei said officials should talk to protesters, but added that "rioters must be put in their place". As the unrest continued, President Masoud Pezeshkian announced economic measures including changes to foreign-exchange subsidies intended to shift support directly to consumers. Pezeshkian later apologized to the nation for the massacres. Vice President Mohammad Reza Aref attempted to resign during the first days of the protests, but it was not accepted by President Pezeshkian. Mohammad Baqer Qalibaf, Speaker of the Islamic Consultative Assembly, said "Malicious individuals and organised movements want to turn any kind of public demand and protest into chaos and chaos using their trained agents in the square, but the Iranian nation has repeatedly demonstrated its vigilance, awareness, and compassion for the country's security".

On 10 January 2026, the IRGC warned that safeguarding security is a "red line". Chief Justice Gholam-Hossein Mohseni-Eje'i, the head of Iran's judiciary, said that the punishment for rioters would "be decisive, maximum and without any legal leniency". Attorney general Mohammad Movahedi Azad warned that anyone taking part in demonstrations is an "enemy of God", a crime that carries the death penalty under Iranian law.

On 19 January, Ahmad-Reza Radan, Iran's national police chief stated that those who were "deceived" into taking part in the demonstrations, or "riots" as the government defines them, have three days to turn themselves in. He also said: Important arrests were made of the main elements of the unrest, who will be punished after going through legal procedures. On 20 January the Iranian Parliament threatened that an attack on Supreme Leader, Ayatollah Ali Khamenei will lead to Jihad. On 25 January, Yousef Pezeshkian, one of president Masoud Pezeshkian's sons, urged authorities to lift internet restrictions, arguing that blocking access would only delay, not prevent, the spread of images and videos showing the government's violent suppression of protesters.

The Workers' Union of the Tehran and Suburbs Bus Company said "the path to the liberation of workers and toilers does not lie in a leader imposed on the people from above, nor in reliance on foreign powers, nor through factions within the government."

On 23 March, the Iranian judiciary said that there would be "no leniencies" for those with convicted with relation to the protests.

=== International ===
==== Iranian diaspora ====
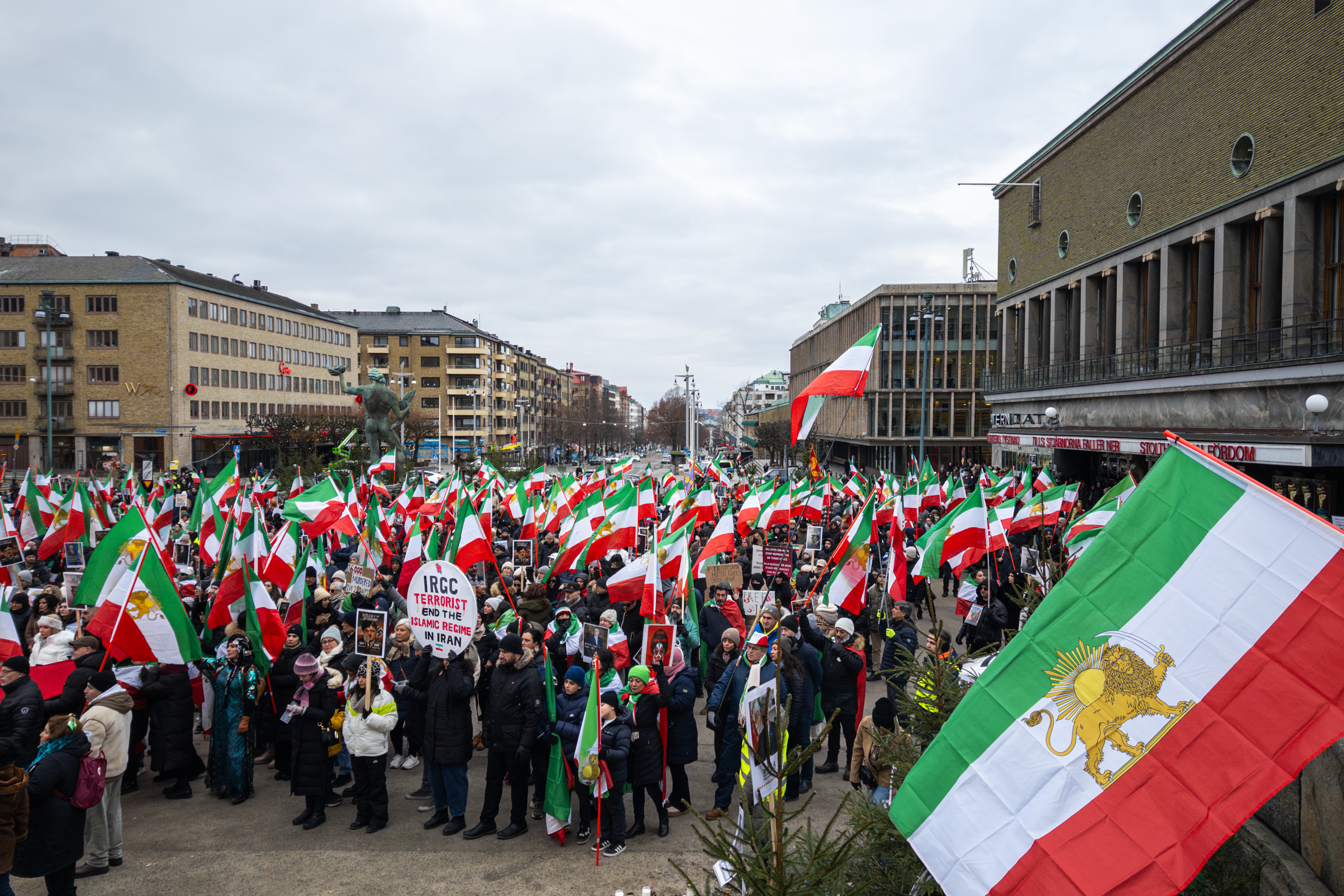
Protest in Gothenburg, Sweden on 25 January 2026

The Iranian diaspora held solidarity rallies worldwide, with some facing violence and threats during the demonstrations.

==== Intergovernmental organisations ====
- European Union: The European External Action Service urged Iran's security forces to exercise restraint and called on authorities to uphold rights including freedom of expression and peaceful assembly. The EU also co-signed the aforementioned joint statement issued by Australia and Canada.
  - European Commission President Ursula von der Leyen, urged the release of imprisoned Iranian protesters, condemned the violent crackdown, and called for internet access to be restored, saying Europe stands "fully behind" those demonstrating.
  - On 16 March 2026, the council of the European Union imposed new sanctions following human rights abuses during the January protests. Those sanctioned include senior officials such as Iran's Deputy Interior Minister for Security, commanders of the Islamic Revolutionary Guard Corps (IRGC), judiciary members, and prison authorities, many of whom are accused of abuses including torture, forced confessions, unfair trials, and harsh sentencing of protesters, activists, journalists, and minorities. Also sanctioned were key organizations involved in repression, including IRGC-linked groups and Naji Research and Development Company (NRDC), which developed surveillance technology used to monitor citizens, as well as cyber police authorities responsible for censorship and online prosecutions. The sanctions include asset freezes, travel bans to the EU, and prohibitions on receiving funds from EU citizens or companies.
- The United Nations criticised Iran's internet shutdown and violation of civil liberties. On 20 January it was stated that The UN Human Rights Council would hold an emergency session on Iran on 23 January about the extreme violence in Iran.
  - UN Special Rapporteur Mai Sato called for an independent investigation to determine whether the Iranian government's suppression of nationwide protests constitutes crimes against humanity.
  - On 23 January 2026, the UN Human Rights Council (UNHRC) adopted a resolution condemning the violent suppression of protests in Iran. Twenty-five states voted in favour of the resolution, including Spain, Italy, Slovenia, Mexico, Colombia, South Korea, and Ghana. Seven states voted against, including China, India, Vietnam, Indonesia, and Pakistan. Fourteen states abstained, including Brazil, Qatar, Egypt, South Africa, Kenya, and Thailand.

==== States ====
- Australia and Canada issued a joint statement condemning Iran's use of force against protesters.
- China – On 23 January 2026, China voted against a UN Human Rights Council resolution that condemned Iran's crackdown on nationwide protests.
- France, Germany and the United Kingdom's Emmanuel Macron, Friedrich Merz and Keir Starmer, respectively, released a joint statement on 9 January urging Iran to exercise restraint.
  - Chancellor Friedrich Merz separately spoke about the violence against Iranian protesters: "This violence is not an expression of strength, but rather a sign of weakness. This violence must end", later saying "If a regime can only keep itself in power by force, then it's effectively at the end. I believe we are now seeing the final days and weeks of this regime. In any case, it has no legitimacy through elections in the population. The population is now rising up against this regime."
- Holy See – Pope Leo XIV expressed concern.
- India – On 23 January 2026, India voted against a UNHRC resolution condemning the crackdown on nationwide protests in Iran.
- Israel – Prime Minister Benjamin Netanyahu said Israel "[identifies] with the struggle of the Iranian people for freedom, liberty and justice". He also mentioned the possibility that the people would take their fate into their hands.
  - Mossad, Israel's intelligence agency, said it was "with [the Iranian protesters] in the field".
- New Zealand – Foreign Minister Winston Peters expressed concern about the killing of protesters and described protests as a "fundamental human right".
- Poland – On 15 January 2026, the Ministry of Foreign Affairs summoned the Iranian ambassador to express concern over the growing number of casualties and arrests, and called on Iran to cease violence against the protesters and initiate talks.
- Spain – The government of Pedro Sánchez condemned the violence against demonstrators in Iran.
- Ukraine – On 2 February 2026, Ukraine designated the IRGC as a terrorist organisation, citing the violent crackdown on protestors.
- United Kingdom – On 13 January 2026, Foreign Secretary Yvette Cooper summoned the Iranian ambassador over the mass killings. British Secretary of State for Transport Heidi Alexander told Sky News that the current priority is to "stem the violence" in Iran. She said Iran is a threat to the Middle East and represses its own people.
  - Kemi Badenoch, leader of the opposition Conservative Party, told the BBC that she would "not have an issue" with Iranian regime change and said she supported the involvement of the US and its allies. She claimed that Iran posed a direct threat to the UK, saying it would "very happily wipe out the UK if it felt it could get away with it".
- United States – US president Donald Trump warned that the United States would intervene if Iranian authorities violently suppressed "peaceful protests", and stated that the US was "locked and loaded and ready to go". Trump later said that US is considering "very strong options" as a response to the Iran protests, among them possible military intervention, and he said: "we will hit them at levels that they've never been hit before". On 15 January, multiple sources reported that Carrier Strike Group 3 was expected to arrive in the Middle East in "about a week", and The New York Times reported that an array of combat and refuelling aircraft "were expected to start flowing into the region soon". On 16 January, Trump thanked the Iranian government for promising to stop the 800 planned executions. Steve Witkoff, the U.S. Special Envoy to the Middle East, reportedly held a secret meeting with Reza Pahlavi, the exiled former Crown Prince of Iran. On 26 January, U.S. officials said the aircraft carrier USS Abraham Lincoln and its escorting warships entered the Middle East region. Defence Ministry spokesman Reza Talaei-Nik, said Iran would respond "forcefully" to any US or Israeli attack. On 13 February 2026, United States Treasury Secretary Scott Bessent claimed that Washington engineered a dollar shortage in Iran to send the Iranian rial into freefall and cause protests in Iran.
- Turkey – Foreign minister Hakan Fidan stated that the protests in Iran were "being manipulated from abroad by Iran's rivals", including the United States and Israel, expressed a wish for the resolution of the perceived antagonism between Iran and the West through negotiations, and called on Iran to engage in "very genuine reconciliation and cooperation" with other Middle Eastern countries.

==== NGOs ====
- Amnesty International and Human Rights Watch condemned the violent repression and documented indiscriminate killings and arrests. Amnesty International later stated in a report marking four years since the Mahsa Amini protests that the Iranian regime coordinated the killing, torture, and sexual abuse of protesters and bystanders during the crackdown on Mahsa Amini protests, and Tehran's suppression of the 2025–2026 Iranian protests bore the "same hallmarks" but on a larger scale.

==== Others ====
- The Mobarizoun Popular Front, a newly-formed Baloch nationalist organisation, expressed its support for the protests.
- The Army of the Men of the Naqshbandi Order expressed support for the Iranian opposition against the Iranian government in early January, calling the Iranian government a "fraudulent mullah regime".
- The Kurdistan Free Life Party (PJAK) co-chair Amir Kerimi stated that the Islamic Republic had lost its social legitimacy and described the situation as an opportunity to build "a democratic and decentralised Iran ... that transcends the nation-state, based on the self-governance of the people", while indicating "the construction of a new authoritarian regime through Reza Pahlavi" as his biggest concern.
  - Israel's former defence minister, Yoav Gallant, stated "At this time, when what matters is the action of the masses on the ground, we need to stay behind and direct things with an invisible hand".

==== Corporate organisations ====
From 9 January 2026, multiple international airlines suspended or cancelled flights to and from Iran due to the protests, the internet blackout, and security concerns. Turkish Airlines cancelled flights between Istanbul and Iranian cities including Tehran, Tabriz and Mashhad, while AJet and Pegasus Airlines suspended all services to Iran. UAE carriers flydubai and Emirates halted flights to Iranian destinations, and Qatar Airways cancelled several flights from Doha to Iran. In Europe, Austrian Airlines cancelled its Vienna-Tehran flight on 9 January. Lufthansa, which had planned to resume flights on 16 January after it suspended them due to regional security concerns, delayed its plans to resume services due to the protests.

==== International travel advisories ====
Since the outbreak of the protests, several countries have issued travel advisories or warnings for Iran and have advised their citizens to leave the country. These advisories cite security concerns and potential disruptions to transportation and communications. Countries that have issued such advisories include the United States, the United Kingdom, Canada, Australia, Germany, France, New Zealand, Ireland, and India.

==== Polling ====
A January 2026 Quinnipiac poll of US voters found that 70% oppose US military involvement in Iran, 79% of Democrats, 80% of independents and 53% of Republicans opposed military involvement.

== Analysis ==
On 30 December, Iran International suggested the protests were a "historic break" of Iranian bazaar merchants, usually a key ally of the Islamic Republic, from the government. This break was fuelled by the Islamic Republic's blame towards the merchants as "price gougers" for rejecting state-standardised pricing, and being unable to restock market inventories if they complied to their demands. Anger towards the government by merchants was also caused by the proposed 2025–26 Iranian budget, which would prioritise deficit spending and tax increases to make up for a decline in oil revenues. Iran International cited the opinion of intelligence analysts and journalists, who suggested Iran might have entered the early stages of regime collapse. On 4 January, Iranian officials, including foreign minister Abbas Araghchi, described the government as being in a "survival mode", with difficulties in either reversing economic problems or handling the threat of attack by the US or Israel. Pezeshkian held emergency meetings following the start of the protests. Some advisers recommended he publicly criticise the role of Khamenei as supreme leader. A 5 January analysis argued the 2025–26 protests differ from the Mahsa Amini protests, in that the former include small towns rather than just cities, and involve a broader range of groups, including students, workers, women, and ethnic minorities. The analysis saw differences in the international context as significant, with Trump's unpredictability and willingness to violate international law as differing from Biden, and the fall of the Assad regime as a weakening of Iran's regional support. The authors saw the focus of the 2025–2026 protests as shifting from social reform to regime change. An analysis in Iran International argued that the fact that students conducted a walkout from high schools throughout the country in mid-February shows that members of Gen Z have not given up despite the attempts to suppress the protests with extensive force.

In early January 2026, The Times referred to intelligence reports stating that Khamenei had an escape plan, for him, 20 close associates and family members, including son Mojtaba Khamenei, ready to flee to Moscow in case security forces defected to the protesters. Beni Sabti, a former Israeli intelligence officer, stated he expected Moscow to be Khamenei's preferred location of exile. Social scientist Mali Rezaei viewed the protests as showing a "deepening rupture between society and the ideological foundations of the state". She argued that one of the factors was the context of Iran's multi-millennial history and ethnic and cultural diversity, in which the seventh century CE Muslim conquest of Persia left in place "a persistent resistance to absolutism". She pointed to a 2020 GAMAAN study that found that irreligion in Iran and support for secularism was growing. Rezaei saw environmental crises such as the disappearance of Lake Urmia as playing a role. She viewed the government's destruction of elements of Persian culture and a "passivity in defending [cultural] legacy" as a weakening of the government's protection of "the nation". Rezaei saw the Mahsa Amini protests and the Woman, Life, Freedom slogan as a turning point in which the protest movement evolved to avoid cooptation by either the government or celebrities. She viewed the pro-Pahlavi slogans as mainly representing a desire for a secular democracy, not absolute monarchy, that would recover national agency.

On 26 January, The New York Times cited US intelligence reports viewing Iran's government as being in its weakest position since the 1979 Iranian Revolution. The NYT stated that a US military buildup near Iran was ongoing and viewed it as unclear if the US administration had taken a decision for a military attack.

=== View as an uprising ===
On 10 January, human rights activist Hamid Enayat suggested that "dozens of instances" of disarmament of security forces during the protests, and the "breakdown of the deterrent function" of the state's monopoly of violence indicated a transition to a new phase, that of an uprising. Enayat cited cases of protesters stopping security forces on buses, disarming them and tying their hands, and a case of a stun gun being taken from a security forces member and used against him. He argued that Malekshahi County effectively came under insurgent control on 6 January when security forces fled. He saw the protests as having shifted to a phase in which the state had lost its power to frighten citizens into obedience.

On 11 January, historian Mark Almond disagreed with comparison of the Iranian protests to the fall of the Berlin Wall in 1989. He argued it would be more like the Storming of the Bastille, because, if successful, the overthrow of the Islamic Republic would be a rebellion against an internally developed regime, rather than one imposed internationally. He argued the protests already qualified for the term "revolution". In contradistinction most Israeli analysts believed the conditions for successful revolution had not yet been met, the existential threat to the regime notwithstanding. A minority view, such as held by retired Brigadier General Amir Avivi, chairman of the Israel Defence and Security Forum (IDSF), is that the Iranian regime faces imminent collapse.

=== View as the beginning of regime change ===
On 13 January, German Chancellor Friedrich Merz stated that "we are now witnessing the final days and weeks of this regime", arguing that "If a regime can only stay in power through violence, then it is effectively finished." Historian Ali Ansari argued that while the Iranian regime has long relied on violence, it now faces a fragile state with dwindling resources and growing disenchantment. Ansari notes, "The Islamic Republic has few options that don't include its own demise", pointing to the rising anger and fear among the population, with many believing the regime has no future. This sentiment marks a turning point, as even the previously apathetic are now rejecting the system. According to The Economist, Iran's leadership, having resorted to violence to maintain power, may be at breaking point. "Iran's rulers are merciless because of their weakness. They have nowhere to turn and nothing to offer their people but violence." It concluded this could be "the moment that ends the theocrats' 47 years in power".

An analysis in Prospect examined four scenarios of change if the government fell. HRANA's total of confirmed deaths and deaths under investigation reached 22,490 on 24 January. According to one scenario, the removal of Khamenei from power would create a power vacuum, while senior bureaucrats would continue to run the state. Competition between remaining elites would bring about a temporary government, as a result of compromise. A second scenario suggests the security establishment would sacrifice clerical rule, including Khamenei, for the sake of seizing power. Coercive measures would be used to prevent disorder and the new leadership "would present itself as the guardian of stability, national unity and territorial integrity," while replacing revolutionary ideology with pragmatism. The third scenario is of simultaneous collapse of political authority and repressive forces, causing different branches of the IRGC and political factions to compete for control, possibly sparking civil war, with the potential of intervention by foreign forces. The final scenario is the return of Pahlavi, who would assume power while the existing government collapses, senior clerics flee to Iraq, some security forces flee to Russia, and most of the IRGC is absorbed into the armed forces.

CNN and the Institute for the Study of War, suggested that groups such as the Kurdistan Freedom Party and the Kurdistan National Guard attacked government military bases and caused severe casualties. A The Wall Street Journal editorial on 2 February strongly encouraged Trump to carry out a military attack to help the protesters overthrow Iran's government, arguing it would be good for Iranians and US interests.

Israeli foreign minister Gideon Sa'ar said that only the Iranian people can topple the Iranian government.

== See also ==
- 2026 Iran explosions
- Gen Z protests
  - Gen Z protests in Asia
- Iran Prosperity Project
- Outline of the 2026 Iran war
- 2026 Iranian pro-government rallies
