= ICHR =

ICHR may refer to:

- Independent Commission for Human Rights, the national human rights institution of Palestine
- Indian Council of Historical Research, an Indian government agency
- Institute of Comparative Human Rights, an institute of the University of Connecticut, US
- International Centre for Human Rights, a Canadian NGO
