= Saleh Mohammadi =

Iranian wrestler (2007–2026)

Personal information
- Born: 11 March 2007 Saveh, Iran
- Died: 19 March 2026 (aged 19) Qom, Iran
- Cause of death: Execution by hanging
- Height: 1.80 m (5 ft 11 in)
- Weight: 88 kg (194 lb)

Sport
- Sport: Wrestling

Saleh Mohammadi (11 March 2007 – 19 March 2026) was an Iranian wrestler and member of the country's national wrestling team.

== Life and career ==
Mohammadi was born in Saveh, and grew up in Qom. He began training in freestyle wrestling, before transitioning to Greco-Roman. In September 2024, he represented Iran at the Saitiev Cup in Krasnoyarsk, Russia, where he won a bronze medal.

== Arrest and execution ==
Mohammadi was arrested on 15 January 2026 on charges of killing a Special Units police officer in Qom on 8 January, during the 2025–2026 Iranian protests. He maintained he was at his uncle's house at the time of the murder, which was apparently corroborated by eyewitnesses and CCTV footage.

After a three-week trial, Mohammadi was sentenced to death by Criminal Court One in Qom for the murder on 4 March. On 19 March, he was publicly executed by hanging, eight days after his nineteenth birthday.

== Reactions ==
Amnesty International strongly condemned the death sentence and deemed the trial against Mohammadi to be “grossly unfair”, calling it a grave violation of the right to life and a use of the death penalty as a tool of political repression. Mohammadi's execution was condemned in a 19 March 2026 editorial published by The Wall Street Journal's editorial board. U.S President Donald Trump condemned the sentence, stating that Mohammadi was killed for speaking up against the Islamic Republic.
