= Yousef Pezeshkian =

Iranian academic

- Born: September 4, 1981 (age 45); Iran
- Occupations: Professor of physics and political advisor
- Parents: Masoud Pezeshkian (father); Fatemah Majidi (mother)
- Family: Pezeshkian

Yousef Pezeshkian (born c. 1981) is an Iranian professor of physics and political advisor. He is the son of President Masoud Pezeshkian, the president of Iran since 2024. He is notable for keeping an online diary on Telegram.

== Family ==
Yousef Pezeshkian is the son of Masoud Pezeshkian, the President of Iran. His father was a physician and cardiac surgeon, and his mother, Fatemeh Majidi, an obstetrician and gynecologist, died in a car accident. One of his brothers also died in the accident, leaving the family with two brothers, Yousef and Mehdi, and a sister, Zahra.

Yusuf Pezeshkiyan graduated from Sharif University and currently teaches as a physics professor at Sahand University of Technology.
