= Amir Avivi =

Israeli general (born 1969)

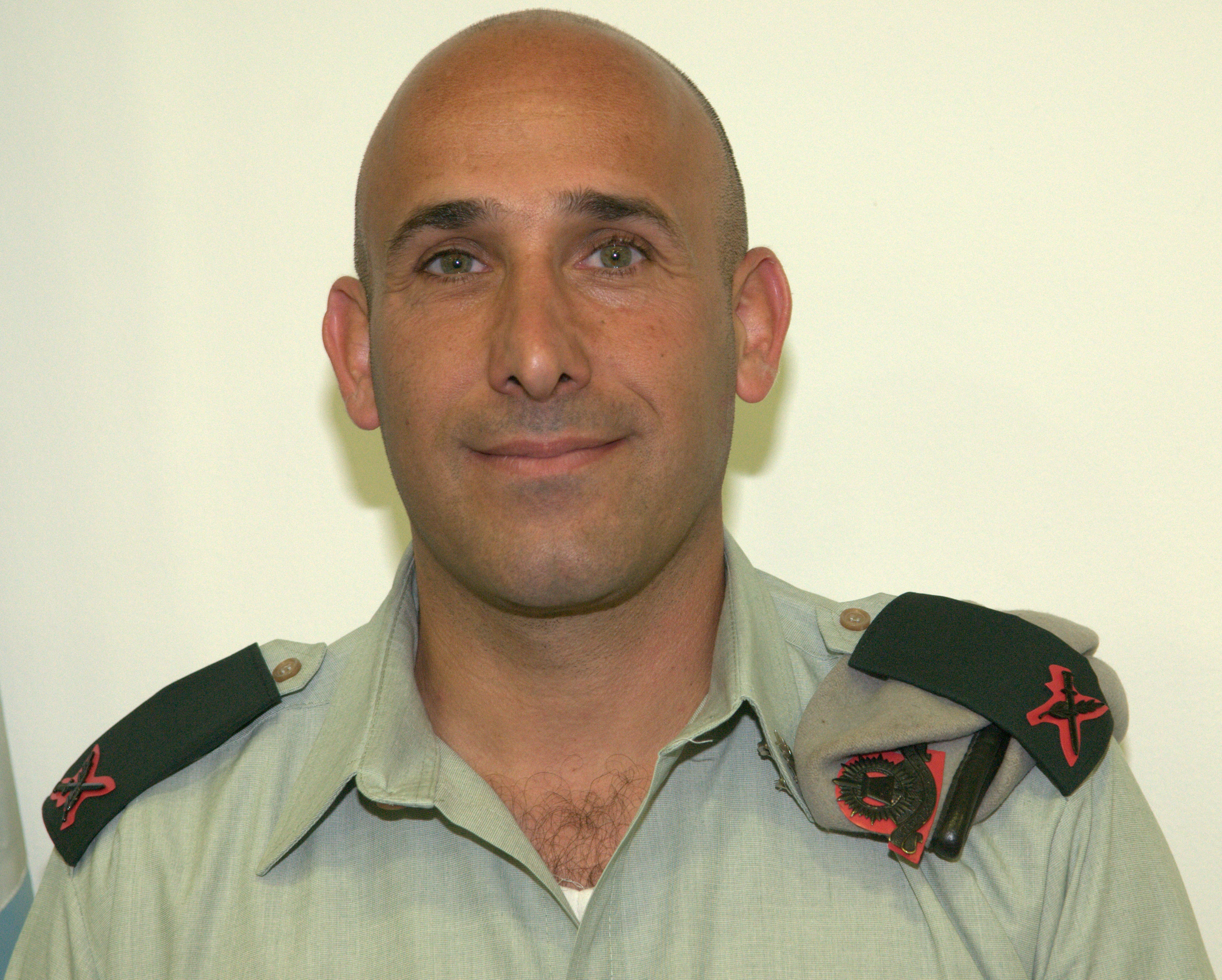
- Amir Avivi on the day he received the rank Lieutenant general
- Native name: אמיר אביבי
- Nickname: Avivi
- Born: 16 April 1969 (age 57)
- Branch: Israel Defense Forces
- Service years: 1987–2017
- Rank: Brigadier general
- Known for: Leader of Habithonistim

Amir Avivi (Hebrew: אמיר אביבי; born 16 April 1969) is a retired Israeli brigadier general at Israel Defense Forces. He served as a military lieutenant at the Defense Establishment Comptroller Unit, he was the commander of the Sagi Brigade and the chief of staff for Israeli general and politician Moshe Ya'alon.

In 2020, he founded the NPO "Habithonistim" (הביטחוניסטים), known in English as the Israel Defense and Security Forum (IDSF), which consists mainly of retired high-ranking members of the Israeli security forces, and has been its leader ever since.

In May 2023, Avivi's book No Retreat: How to Secure Israel for Generations to Come (לא נשוב אחור: כיצד נבטיח את ביטחון ישראל לדורות) was published.

== Activism ==
On 29 November 2018, Avivi spoke at the "My Israel National Interest Conference" and presented his political plan: New State Solution. The main point of the plan is to establish a Palestinian state in the Gaza Strip and the northern Sinai Peninsula, where the Palestinians (including those in the West Bank) will be citizens. The territory will be donated by Egypt, which will receive generous economic aid and a leading status in the Arab world in exchange for this.

In June 2020, Avivi and members of the "Habithonistim" met with Israeli Prime Minister Benjamin Netanyahu, in order to support Trump peace plan. Avivi emphasized that the United States recognition is very important to the implementation of the move and that this is an historic opportunity to make peace. In 2023, Avivi was ranked 37th on the Jerusalem Post's list "50 Most Influential Jews in the World".

== Political views ==
In 2022, Avivi argued that Israel is the Jewish people's most vital strategic asset, and that Israel cannot exist without absolute security control over the West Bank, which he claims is impossible without Israeli settlements.

== Political career ==
Avivi was working towards establishing a new party ahead of the 2026 Israeli legislative election, focusing on attracting voters from the centre-right. The people involved with the nascent party decided against moving forward with the plan, despite the significant investment, as it was believed that having too many parties running would have made it difficult for the right wing to win the election.
