= 2025–26 Iranian budget =

Proposed state budget for the Iranian year 1404

The 2025–26 Iranian budget was approved in November 2024. The budget featured a high deficit, more than 950 trillion toman. Predicted oil revenues were $2 trillion toman with a 26% deficit. The Iranian Armed Forces' share over Iran's oil revenue increased fourfold. The government planned to withdraw 500 billion from its National Development Fund to cover its debts. The government received 40% more income. Minimum wages for government employees increased 20%. Electricity bills grew 38%-80%.
