= International Centre for Human Rights =

Canadian non-government organisation

- Formation: October 2000; 26 years ago
- Type: Nonprofit
- Registration no.: 1810535
- Purpose: Human rights advocacy
- Location: Toronto, Canada
- Official language: English, Farsi
- President: Ardeshir Zarezadeh
- Website: humanrightsintl.com

The International Centre for Human Rights (ICHR) is a Canadian non-government organization that aims to promote human rights worldwide and in Iran. The group's office is in Toronto.

== Creation ==
ICHR was founded in October 2000 by Ardeshir Zarezadeh, a former political prisoner from Iran. ICHR is affiliated with the NGO One Free World International.

== Activities ==
ICHR has advocated for sanctioning the Islamic Revolutionary Guard Corps (IRGC) for being a terrorist group. In 2012, ICHR held rallies to release Iranian political prisoner Saeed Malekpour.

In December 2014, Mohammad Seddigh Kaboudvand received an award in recognition of his work defending the rights of Kurds in Iran and neighbouring countries.

In December 2023, ICHR gave Manouchehr Bakhtiariv a humanitarian award for his campaign for seeking justice after the IRGC killed his son. Canadian MP Melissa Lantsman attended the award ceremony.

ICHR stated that the January 2026 massacres of protesters in Iran were crimes against humanity and that under the 2005 Responsibility to protect (R2P) principle of the United Nations General Assembly, the international community had a legal obligation to intervene in Iran, overriding the principle of national sovereignty. On 20 January, ICHR estimated the number of deaths from the protests as 43,000, based on what it described as its "comprehensive review of images, videos, and received reports, ... and interviews with a credible source within Iran's public health system, additional independent sources, and further documentation review".

== See also ==
- Human rights in the Islamic Republic of Iran
