= 2026 Malekshahi massacre =

Part of 2026 Iran massacres

- Part of 2025–2026 Iranian protests, 2026 Iran massacres
- Location: Malekshahi County, Ilam province, Iran
- Date: 3 January 2026
- Injuries: 30–40
- Victim: at least 5

The 2026 Malekshahi massacre was committed by the forces of the Islamic Revolutionary Guard Corps (IRGC) and Basij on 3 January 2026 in Malekshahi County, Ilam province, Iran. The massacre began at noon when the IRGC and Basij forces opened fire on protesting civilians, killing several.

== Background ==
The 2025–2026 protests in Iran began amid ongoing economic crises, including high inflation, a decline national currency value, and increased cost-of-living, which affected different strata of society. In their early stages, the protests consisted of public demonstrations, bazaar strikes, and the chanting of critical slogans, and continued for several consecutive days. Events which coincided with the protests, such as the resignation of the Governor of the Central Bank, contributed to their intensification. The main bazaar, where some of the protests originated is an institution traditionally regarded as conservative and closely aligned with the establishment, and some analysts interpret this shift in attitude as a reflection of the expanding economic discontent and sign of change in traditional patterns of support for the government.

In the first few days of the protests, the scope of public discontent and demonstrations expanded to various cities and regions across Iran. In the capital, Tehran, people gathered in several neighbourhoods, including Moshiriyeh, Nazi Abad, and Haft Hoz, while strikes and protests by merchants continued in the main bazaar. At the same time, in Ilam province, protests reached Malekshahi County, where security forces took action to disperse demonstrators. This geographic spread of the protests indicated a transformation of initial economic grievances into political and anti-government protests, drawing attention to the depth of the economic and social instability in the country.

== Massacre ==
On 3 January 2026, a group of people gathered in protest in Malekshahi County, Ilam province, chanting slogans such as "Death to Khamenei".

Forces of the Islamic Revolutionary Guard Corps (IRGC) opened fire on protesters using military-grade weapons while the protesters were passing through a street where the governor's office and the Malekshahi Basij headquarters are located.

According to the Kurdistan Human Rights Network (KHRN), as of 4 January 2026, three protesters, Reza Azimzadeh, Mahdi Emamipour and Latif Karimi had died as a result of the shooting, and 30 others were injured. Hengaw estimated the number of injured to be 40. As of 4 January, two of the injured (initially thought to have died) were in critical condition in hospital. The injured were transferred to a Imam Khomeini Hospital in Ilam. One of those hospitalised, Ali Karimi Bavolaki, died several hours later, on 4 January 2026. Farez (or Fares) Agha-Mohammadi and Mohammad Moghaddasi (Bozoneh) were also initially reported, as of 3 January, to have been killed. On 6 January, KHRN stated that Agha-Mohammadi, who had been shot in the head, had initially survived. He died on 5 January in Imam Khomeini Hospital. His brother, Mostafa Agha-Mohammadi, also wounded in the protest, remained in critical condition. Mohammadreza Karami, another protester wounded in the protest, died on 6 January.

Media outlets close to the IRGC initially reported the death of one security officer. On 3 January, Al Monitor referred to a statement by Mehr that IRGC member Latif Karimi was killed during the clashes between protesters and security forces. On 4 January, eyewitnesses and other sources clarified that Karimi was present among the protesters when he was shot by IRGC members, and died in Imam Khomeini Hospital in Ilam. Karimi was a retired brigadier-general by profession. Karimi's son stated on Telegram, "My father's only 'crime' was telling [the government security forces] not to shoot at the people."

Following the incident, Malekshahi was placed under heavy security measures.

== Hospital ==
Local sources reported that staff at Malekshahi hospital faced shortages of blood supplies and specialist physicians and issued a public call for blood donations. Riot police tried to enter the hospital to arrest injured protesters. Local residents and hospital staff blocked the police, preventing the arrests. On 4 January 2026, funeral ceremonies for three of the killed protesters were held with a large public attendance. Participants chanted protest slogans.

Security forces (IRGC and police) also entered Imam Khomeini Hospital in Ilam on 4 January, and attempted to arrest those injured in the protests. Local sources stated that the security forces used tear gas and batons, and fired weapons. The security forces smashed glass doors and forced their way into wards and rooms, and assaulted medical staff, patients and patients' families in their attempts to arrest the injured. The forces' assault disrupted the hospitals' regular medical services.

On 5 January, KHRN described the security forces as holding the hospital under siege.

== Funeral ==
Funerals for Reza Azimzadeh, Latif Karimi, and Mehdi Emamipour were held on 3 January at Malekshahi cemetery. Attendees chanted anti-government slogans.

== Reactions ==
=== National ===
The security forces' raids on the hospital gained national attention. On 6 January, the Ministry of Health and Medical Education that it was investigating the event "urgently" in order to protect the medical centre, medical staff and patients. The Minister of Interior was ordered to investigate the Ilam raid and provide a report.

=== International ===
On 6 January, US officials described the security forces' attack on the hospital as a "clear crime against humanity" and stating "hospitals are not battlefields". The US Department of State distributed images of the attack on online social media.

Amnesty International said that the attack was a violation of international law.

== See also ==
- 2025–2026 Iranian protests
- 2026 Iran massacres
- 2026 Rasht massacre
