= 2025–2026 Iran massacres =

Mass killing of protesters in Iran

- Part of the 2025–2026 Iranian protests and prelude to the 2026 Iran war
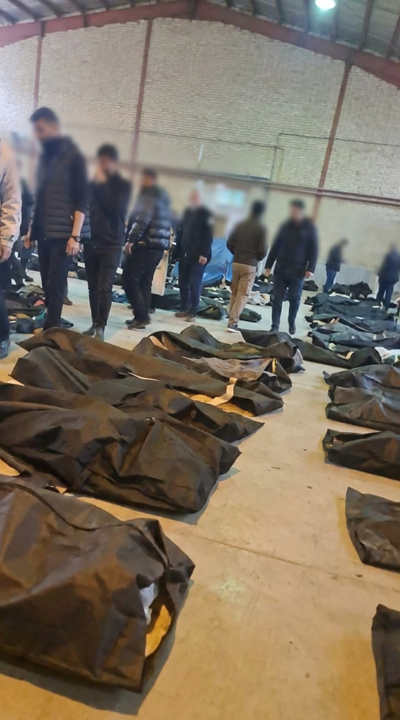
- Body bags of victims of the massacres on 12 January 2026
- Location: Iran
- Date: 30 December 2025 – 31 March 2026 (3 months and 1 day)
- Target: Protesters
- Attack type: Massacres, mass murder, mass shooting, executions, summary executions, torture murders
- Deaths: Estimates ranged from 5,000–36,500+, of which 7,007 are confirmed by Human Rights Activists News Agency (HRANA) (Note: • 7,007 confirmed deaths of protesters per Human Rights Activists in Iran News Agency in-depth report The Crimson Winter • >30,000 based on hospital data per Amir Parasta per Time reported that "As many as 30,000 people could have been killed in the streets of Iran on Jan. 8 and 9 alone, two senior officials of the country’s Ministry of Health told TIME." • Over 36,500 killed during 8–9 January, per Iran International • On 28 January, The Guardian reported that the death toll could be more than 30,000, and that less than 10% of deaths may have been officially registered. • On 16 January, Mai Sato, the United Nations Special Rapporteur on Human Rights in Iran stated that at least 5,000 had been killed and that the number could be as high as 20,000.)
- Perpetrators: Government of Iran and allied foreign militias

The 2025–2026 Iran massacres were a series of mass killings of civilians by the Iranian government during the 2025–2026 Iranian protests, deploying both its own security forces and importing foreign militias to suppress public dissent nationwide. As of September 2026, most death toll estimates ranged from 5,000 people to over 36,500, including 209 government-affiliated military and non-military personnel, making these among the largest massacres in the modern history of Iran.

On 25 January, Time reported that a specific list included 30,304 protest-related deaths registered in civilian hospitals for 8 and 9 January alone. The same day, Iran International estimated total deaths at over 36,500. An Iranian doctors' network cited by The Guardian estimated that the death toll could be more than 30,000, based on an estimated factor of ten undercount in the official death toll. AP News reported that the government's overwhelming use of violence had caused despair among the public.

Ali Larijani, secretary of the Supreme National Security Council, has been attributed responsibility as one of the key planners of the massacres by former Iranian government officials. The crackdown was initiated in pursuit of orders from Supreme Leader Ali Khamenei and senior officials to use live fire against protesters. Khamenei himself had ordered the protests "crush[ed]... by any means necessary". As of 19 January 2026, the Iranian government had reasserted control over the protests. Worldwide support protests took place on 14 February, and protest waves restarted in western Iran on 16 February and in universities on 21 February.

Khamenei acknowledged "thousands" had been killed during the protests, blaming American president Donald Trump for the massacre and accusing those leading the protests of affiliation with the United States and Israel. The Iranian government put the death toll at 3,117, stating that 2,447 were civilians and security forces, and the rest were "terrorists". The government published an official list of 2,986 victims. Human Rights Activists in Iran (HRANA) described the official list as mostly unverifiable due to the lack of sufficient identifying details. Iran International stated on 3 February that it had its own confirmed list of 6,634 deaths, of which less than 100 were on the official list. HRANA published a full report on 23 February 2026, including a detailed named list of 7,007 deaths. According to documents, Iran International reported that more than 36,500 Iranians were killed by security forces during the January 8-9 crackdown. Similarly, Time Magazine, citing Iranian health ministry officials, reported that more than 30,000 people could have been killed during the crackdown.

On 11 January 2026, Iranian president Masoud Pezeshkian accused the United States and Israel of being behind the unrest and alleged that foreign-backed "terrorists" were responsible for killings during the protests. The Iranian cabinet similarly blamed US- and Israeli-backed "mercenaries and terrorists" for killing civilians and security personnel, while Ali Larijani called Donald Trump and Benjamin Netanyahu "the main killers of the people of Iran". On 11 February, Pezeshkian expressed shame over the events and apologized for what he called the government's "shortcomings and deficiencies", but did not acknowledge responsibility by Iranian security forces for the killings. American and Israeli support for the protesters was later partially confirmed when president Donald Trump admitted that he sent weapons to separatist and rebel groups in Iran.

In January 2026, and from 28 February to late May 2026, Iranian authorities imposed a total internet shutdown as part of their crackdown on the protests, restricting communication inside the country and limiting the flow of information about the killings to the outside world.

An Iranian mother grieving over bodies of massacred protesters brought to the forensic medical center in Kahrizak, south of Tehran

== Background ==
Prior to the 2025–26 protests, the higher ranges of numbers of deaths of protesters and the higher ranges of numbers of mass executions of political prisoners during events in the history of the Islamic Republic of Iran have included 3,400 executions during the 1981–1982 Iran Massacres and 1,000 to 30,000 executions in 1988, 72 protestor deaths during the 2009 Iranian presidential election protests, 300–1,500 protestor deaths during the 2019–2020 protests, and 551 during the 2022–2023 Mahsa Amini protests.

Protester deaths and political prisoner executions in Iran
Date	Event	Estimates	Ref
1981–1982	1981–1982 Iran massacres	3,500+	
1988	1988 executions	1,000–33,000	
2009	2009 election protests	72	
2019–2020	2019–2020 protests	300–1,500	
2022–2023	Mahsa Amini protests	551+	

== Casualty estimates ==
=== Summary table ===
Death toll estimates
Source	Date (latest relevant)	Death toll	References
Official Iranian Government (via Pezeshkian admin / Supreme National Security Council)	February 2026	3,117 (incl. ~200–214 security forces)	
HRANA (Human Rights Activists News Agency – US-based, verification-focused)	February 2026	7,007 verified (6,488 protesters, 236 minors; 11,000+ under investigation)	
UN Human Rights Experts / Special Rapporteur on Iran	February 2026	Tens of thousands (discrepancy noted; official 3,117 vs. grassroots estimates in tens of thousands)	
The Guardian (citing medics/morgue staff)	January 2026	>30,000 possible	
Time magazine (citing Iranian health ministry officials)	January 2026	>30,000 (up to 33,000+)	(referenced in multiple sources)
Iran International	January 2026	36,500+	

=== Human rights organisations and independent media ===
Based on verified reports and video footage, during the first seven days of protests, security forces made extensive use of live ammunition, tear gas and crowd-control weapons, and conducted violent arrests. The Guardian reported that at least three children were killed and over 40 minors arrested during eight days of protests.

According to HRANA, during the first ten days of nationwide protests, through to 6 January inclusive, at least 34 protesters were killed, and at least 2,076 citizens arrested in at least 285 locations. On 7 January, 13 protesters were killed, bringing the total to 45, per Iran Human Rights.

On 8 January, at least 217 were killed in Tehran.

As of 10 January, the internet blackout limited reporting on casualties. Iran International estimated on 10 January that at least 2,000 protesters had been killed by government forces over the previous 48 hours.

On 12 January, Time reported that the number of protesters killed might have reached 6,000, excluding protesters whose bodies were taken directly to morgues.

On 13 January, Iran International concluded a multi-stage investigation, and based on government sources, eyewitness accounts, field reports, data from hospitals and testimonies from Iranian doctors and nurses, ascertained that at least 12,000 civilians had been killed. According to the report, the mass killings took place during the 8th and 9th January, and were largely perpetrated by the Islamic Revolutionary Guard Corps (IRGC) and members of the Basij militia. Planned and conducted in an organized manner, and, based on information obtained from the Supreme National Security Council and the Presidential Office, it was ordered by supreme leader Ali Khamenei himself, with the approval of the three branches of government. Furthermore, an order was given by the Supreme National Security Council for direct fire. On 25 January, The New York Times reported that Ali Khamenei himself ordered "to crush the protests by any means necessary". A senior government official was quoted as saying that security forces were given the green light to kill indiscriminately, including civilians, in order to "spread fear and deter further protests". One member of the security forces said that the goal was to kill as many people as possible.

On 13 January, CBS News, citing activist groups, stated the death toll may be as high as 20,000. On 17 January, The Sunday Times reported that at least 16,500 to 18,000 people had been killed and 330,000 injured. In a speech broadcast by Iranian state media on 17 January, Ali Khamenei admitted "several thousand" were killed during the protests. On 18 January, an Iranian official told Reuters that Iranian government estimates put the total death toll from the massacres at over 5,000.

On 20 January, the International Centre for Human Rights (ICHR) estimated, based on image and video evidence and sources in Iran, including "a credible source within Iran's public health system", that 43,000 people had been killed by the security forces.

On 22 January, the United Nations Special Rapporteur on Human Rights in Iran stated the number of civilians killed may surpass 20,000. On 22 January, HRANA updated its verified death counts to 4,714 adult protesters, 42 minors, 207 security force members, and 39 non-participants, while 9,798 additional deaths remained under investigation. NewsNation stated that its sources estimated the death count to be "closer to 30,000" than to HRANA's counts. On 24 January, HRANA's death count, including cases under investigation, exceeded 20,000: 5,149 adult protesters, 60 minors, 208 security force members, 42 non-participants, and 17,031 deaths under investigation, for a total of 22,490. HRANA stated that the overall level of repression was unprecedented.

A count of 25,654 "clinically reported [protest-related] deaths" for dates "up to the [23rd of] January" was stated by a doctor, Amir Parasta, on the basis of medical records "verified by at least two individuals in each medical organization". Sky News published the count on 29 January. A count of 25,654 deaths was published by The Sunday Times on 24 January as a "clinically verified" update from the doctors' network that had earlier reported a count of ~16,500.

On 24 January, The Sunday Times reported a statement by Reza Pahlavi that according to "activists and political prisoners" in Iran and "medical authorities", the total death toll was ~50,000, including ~15,000 deaths in Tehran.

On 25 January, Time reported an estimate of roughly ~30,000 protesters killed on the 8th and 9th of January alone. Amir Parasta, described by Time as a German–Iranian surgeon, stated to Time a total of 30,304 protest-related deaths from hospital records, excluding protest-related deaths recorded in military hospitals, deaths where the body was taken directly to a morgue, and deaths recorded in hospitals were absent from the list. Two senior officials told Time that ~30,000 "could have been killed", that the administration ran out of body bags, and that semi-trailer trucks were used instead of ambulances. On the same day, Iran International reported a series of official reports with death tolls to above 35,000. Reports to the Ministry of Interior on 20 January gave a count above 30,000. A report provided to the National Security and Foreign Policy Committee of the Iranian Parliament gave a count of 27,500. Reports by the Intelligence Organization of the Islamic Revolutionary Guard Corps were of 33,000 on 22 January and 36,500 on 24 January.

On 27 January, a "network of more than 80 medical professionals across 12 of Iran's 31 provinces" in contact with The Guardian estimated that based on their observations, less than 10% of deaths were being officially registered. They inferred that the total "could exceed 30,000".

On 28 January, HRANA updated its verified death counts to 5,993 adult protesters, 113 minors, 214 security force members, and 53 non-participants; and its count of deaths still under investigation to 17,091 people. On 1 February, HRANA's verified death counts increased to 6,425 adult protesters, 146 minors, and 57 non-participants. The security force death count remained at 214. The number of death cases still under investigation dropped to 11,280 names.

A doctor, Yaser Rahmani–Rad, stated to Sky News that his network of doctors had previously estimated 20 to 30 thousand protest-related deaths, and at the time of the interview, published on 29 January, judged that the true value "could be higher".

On 23 February, HRANA published a detailed report, The Crimson Winter, based on the first 50 days of the protests, including a list of the names and other details of the 7007 confirmed deaths (6488 adult protesters, 236 minors, 207 security force members, and 76 non-participants), and 11,744 cases that remained under review.

=== Iranian government ===
On 22 January 2026, Iran Human Rights (IHRNGO) argued that Iranian government sources "ha[d] a documented and long-standing record of systematically underreporting deadly state violence". IHRNGO stated that based on verified executions of prisoners in Iran over the preceding five years, the official government figures only covered "an annual average of 12% of the executions recorded by IHRNGO".

On 1 February, the Office of the President of Iran published a list of 2,986 people killed in "recent incidents" out of the 3,117 that it had earlier stated as having been killed during the protests, stating that 131 identities were not yet determined. According to HRANA, the list was mostly unverifiable, due to "lack[ing] key information such as the time and place of death, the individual's status (protester, non-protester, or government-affiliated force), and a description of the circumstances". The Iran International editorial board stated on the 3rd of February that it had prepared its own list of 6,634 protest-related deaths, based on documentation including the "victims' names, photographs, cities of residence, circumstances of death, and testimonies provided by families and relatives". Iran International stated that there were less than 100 names in common between the two lists, and described the government's list as "a shameful attempt to downplay the scale of the largest street massacre in Iran's contemporary history."

== Planning of the massacres ==
=== General preparations ===
According to a former Ministry of Interior official who had earlier been an IRGC member, long-term preparation for a massacre of the type that took place mainly on 8 and 9 January 2026 started in 2022. Plans included "marking and identifying elevated locations for sniper deployment", "ideological theoretical training and psychological preparation to kill, including firing final shots at protesters", and "training and educating criminal elements to play the role of leaders in gatherings, both to identify people and to steer street movements." According to IranWire, Ali Larijani was one of the key planners of the massacres, which were modelled on those on the 1989 Tiananmen Square massacre.

=== Specific orders ===
Primary responsibility for the massacres was attributed by The New York Times (NYT) and Iran International to Supreme Leader Ali Khamenei. According to the NYT, Khamenei gave an order on 9 January to the Supreme National Security Council to "crush the protests by any means necessary". Iran International stated the Khamenei gave "a direct order" to carry out the killings and that "the heads of all three branches of government" had "explicit knowledge" and gave their approval for the order.

Iran International stated that the Supreme National Security Council issued an order for live fire. The NYT stated that the orders given to security forces were "to shoot to kill and to show no mercy".

Former IRGC detainee "Kazem", released in exchange for cooperation with the IRGC, described his participation on the nights of 8 and 9 January to Iran International. On the afternoon of 7 January, Kazem was ordered to report to the IRGC Vali-e Asr garrison at 10:00 on 8 January. At the 8 January morning meeting, about 50 to 60 men including Kazem were authorised to Kalashnikov rifles, handguns and ammunition. Kazem received a temporary mission order on Mohammad Rasulullah Corps of Greater Tehran letterhead, signed by an official of the Imam Ali Central Security Headquarters, a weapon, and was deployed in western Tehran before 20:00. According to Kazem, the operations were carried out by two methods: "hunting leaders" and "crowd steering". In "hunting leaders", IRGC agents pretended to be protest participants, selected key protesters as targets, and either shot them from behind in convenient situations with handguns, or described their clothing as targets to rooftop snipers. In "crowd steering", parts of the crowd were steered into areas where they were ambushed and killed, aiming to maximise the number of killings.

Kazem stated that government security forces had removed valuables from banks and mosques and then set them on fire. He stated that he had "personally witnessed instructions to remove valuable items from a mosque before it was set on fire".

== Nature ==
=== Types of atrocities ===
Hengaw argued on 13 January 2026 that, based on its evidence, the massacres of protesters were crimes against humanity under customary international law and the Rome Statute, since they consisted of "government forces, acting within a coordinated, widespread, and systematic policy of repression, [committing] acts including the premeditated killing of civilian protesters ... [and] the extensive and lethal use of force" resulting in "mass killings of protesters in various parts of" Iran, with 2,500 victims confirmed by Hengaw. On 24 January, Hengaw published another report, again stating that the killings constituted "clear instances" of crimes against humanity.

The United Nations Special Rapporteur on Human Rights in Iran stated that the evidence justified investigating the possibility that the killings of the protesters were crimes against humanity. She stated that the mandate of the Independent International Fact-Finding Mission on the Islamic Republic of Iran could be extended and that the fact-finding mission could investigate whether Ali Khamenei should be referred for investigation by the International Criminal Court.

Human Rights Watch and the International Commission of Jurists called for the fact-finding mission to investigate the massacres and to be given sufficient resources for its investigation. On 19 January, Iran Human Rights called for the massacres to be investigated by the International Criminal Court. An emergency meeting of the United Nations Human Rights Council on the human rights situation in relation to the protests was scheduled for 23 January.

On 28 January, a group of Iranian lawyers and other intellectuals, including Amirsalar Davoudi, Hatam Ghaderi, Abolfazl Ghadyani, Mehdi Mahmoudian, Abdollah Momeni, Mohammad Najafi, Jafar Panahi, Mohammad Rasoulof, Nasrin Sotoudeh, and Sedigheh Vasmaghi, and the Narges Mohammadi Human Rights Foundation, published a statement on Instagram asserting that the killings were a crime against humanity. The statement attributed principal responsibility to Khamenei. Three of those signing, Mehdi Mahmoudian, Abdollah Momeni, and Vida Rabbani, were arrested on 31 January.

=== Direct order for live fire and killing of hospitalised protesters ===
Sources close to Iran's Supreme National Security Council and the presidential office report that the killing of protesters was carried out on the direct order of Supreme Leader Ali Khamenei, with full approval from senior state officials. The council allegedly authorised live fire, which was executed mainly by the IRGC in what is described as a deliberate, organised operation exceptional in scale and intensity.

On 13 January, The Guardian reported that Islamic Republic security forces were documented using shotguns and rifles with live ammunition, as well as heavy DShK machine guns against protesters, with a Tehran doctor stating that security forces were "shooting to kill", and this was confirmed with testimony from a surviving protester. Further reports also indicated that the security forces used snipers and knives to attack protesters.

A spokesperson from the Abdorrahman Boroumand Center for Human Rights cited evidence that even when using "less lethal" weapons, security forces were deliberately shooting at the heads, eyes, genitals and vital organs of the protesters, so as to terrorize protesters by mutilating them and causing them permanent disability, reusing the tactic employed in the 2022 Mahsa Amini protests. At least one young girl had been shot in the pelvic area and was in critical condition. A medic in Tehran reported that there were "direct shots to the heads of the young people, to their hearts as well."

Additionally, multiple testimonies have revealed Iranian security forces raiding hospitals to arrest, and in many cases execute, hospitalised protesters. On 4 January, according to Namdar Baghaei Yazdi, vice president of the Iranian Medical Society UK, security forces in full riot gear stormed Imam Khomeini Hospital in Ilam, attacked medical personnel with tear gas and shotgun pellets and arrested injured protesters, with another similar assault being carried out by security forces on 6 January in Sina Hospital in Tehran. Yazdi was quoted as saying, "Hospitals are no longer sacred in Iran, and we are very concerned for our medical colleagues there who are already at risk from the regime."

A doctor from southern Iran reported that security forces had "finished off" protesters who had been hospitalized at the time, further stating, "they killed many, arrested many, and many are on the run. The situation is very bad." According to The Times, another doctor from Tehran stated that security forces had "gone into hospitals and forcibly taken the corpses of protesters with them", and some of the wounded protesters treat their injuries at home and avoid being admitted to the hospital out of fear of being arrested. Iran Human Rights reported that in Rasht, security forces surrounded and trapped protesters inside the Rasht Bazaar, set it on fire, and killed people attempting to surrender or escape, while also "finishing off" wounded survivors in the streets and hospitals. Protesters who tried to flee from the scene of the fire were shot by security forces. Forces also blocked fire trucks from responding to the fire. According to HRANA, at least 392 people were killed in Rasht, the vast majority of them since the beginning of the Internet blackout on 8 January.

Reports have also emerged of the use of live ammunition on protesters in Kerman.

On 31 January, The Wall Street Journal reported accounts of authorities executing injured protesters.

On 11 February, The New Yorker reported that the regime forces targeted not only wounded protesters but also medical workers.

=== Chemical weapons ===
On 17 January, reports indicated the Iranian government may have used chemical weapons against protesters. Footage showed security forces atop vehicles wearing hazmat suits and masks designed for hazardous chemical materials. Some victims reportedly died several days after exposure rather than immediately. On 23 January, chemical gas was reported to have been used on the crowds of protesters and escape routes, causing severe breathing problems, burning pain of the eyes, skin and lungs, vomiting blood, and sudden weakness and loss of movement.

There were also concerns about detained protesters being injected with unknown substances while in custody. The injections were first reported on 18 January, and on 1 February, it was reported that activists and human rights monitors had linked forced injections of unknown substances in detention to a growing pattern of deaths among current and former prisoners.

On 4 February, a group of human rights organizations called for an investigation into the alleged use of chemical weapons.

=== Internal propaganda and coercion ===
The Iranian government has been accused of using footage of protesters' bodies in morgues to demoralise future protests and of leaving piles of bodies in what was described as an attempt to instill fear in protesters. Families trying to receive the bodies of their loved ones have oftentimes been forced to pay compensation for the bullets that killed their relatives. Reports stated that security forces and Revolutionary Guard members raided and intimidated the families of protesters who were killed, imposed restrictions on the retrieval and burial of bodies, and warned that families would be charged fees.

There have been reports that families were unable to locate the remains of their relatives after authorities buried them in locations far from where the deaths occurred. Reports have also indicated that the authorities retained the remains until families consented to official accounts describing the deceased as aligned with the government and Basij rather than as protesters. Likewise, images and videos from the pro-government rallies were reported to have been altered. HRANA also reported cases of forced confessions being broadcast. Furthermore, doctors and healthcare workers were reported to have been arrested or disappeared for providing medical care to protesters or documenting their injuries. The Islamic Republic also pressured families of detainees to attend pro-government rallies planned for 22 Bahman (11 February), marking the anniversary of the 1979 Islamic Revolution, telling them that only if they complied and attended would their detained relatives be spared execution or have their sentences reduced.

Following the widespread wave of arrests during the January 2026 protests, human rights organizations and groups reported that a number of detainees were subjected to security pressure to extract forced confessions. According to published reports, state media of the Islamic Republic of Iran and affiliated outlets broadcast videos of detainees confessing to various charges. Human rights groups have described these confessions as the result of pressure, torture, or threats, and as being in violation of the principles of fair trial. Human rights observers have stated that the broadcasting of these confessions on state or affiliated media has taken place while many detainees were denied access to legal counsel or fair judicial proceedings, raising concerns that the confessions were obtained under coercion or threat.

=== Pressure on doctors and medical staff ===
During the nationwide protests of January 2026 in Iran, doctors, nurses, and other medical staff faced a significant number of injured individuals. According to reports, the injuries included gunshot wounds from live ammunition, severe beatings, bone fractures, injuries caused by tear gas, and in some cases required emergency medical interventions such as immediate surgery and intensive care. Radio Farda reported that some of the injured avoided seeking treatment at official hospitals due to fear of arrest, and that part of the medical care was therefore provided discreetly or outside normal hospital procedures.

As the number of injured increased, several media outlets and human rights organizations reported pressure being exerted on doctors and medical staff to prevent them from treating those wounded in the protests. IranWire reported that security agencies contacted or summoned some doctors and hospital administrators, threatening them and instructing them to refrain from treating injured protesters or to provide security authorities with information about injured individuals who sought medical care. According to IranWire, the purpose of these measures was to intimidate the medical community and prevent the dissemination of information regarding the number and condition of the injured.

HRANA, the news agency of the Human Rights Activists in Iran, reported the arrest of several doctors in connection with the January 2026 protests. Among those reported arrested were Hossein Zarrabian, a specialist physician in Isfahan, and Asghar Shakeri, a doctor in Mashhad. According to HRANA and IranWire, these arrests were carried out in response to the provision of medical assistance to individuals injured during the protests.

A group of Iranian ophthalmologists issued an open letter addressed to the heads of government branches and military, law enforcement, and judicial authorities, warning about a concerning increase in severe eye injuries and permanent blindness during the suppression of popular protests. In the statement, the use of pellet guns was identified as the primary cause of these injuries, and the targeting of protesters' eyes and faces was described as "completely unacceptable" and a clear instance of a "violation of human dignity." The physicians also called for the immediate cessation of the use of these weapons, independent investigations, prosecution of those responsible, and medical support for the victims.

In February 2026, reports emerged of an underground 'Red Lion and Sun' network to safely treat wounded protesters.

=== Recruitment of foreign militias ===
The presence of state-sponsored foreign militias, namely the Iraqi Popular Mobilisation Forces, Arabic-speaking mercenaries, Lebanese Hezbollah, the Pakistani Liwa Zainabiyoun, and the Afghan Liwa Fatemiyoun, in suppressing protests was reported. Iran International reported that on 2 January 2026, Iraqi militias affiliated with the Iranian government recruited forces to assist Iranian security forces in suppressing protests in Iran. On 6 January 2026, it was reported that approximately 800 members of Iraqi militia groups, including Kata'ib Hezbollah, Harakat al-Nujaba, Sayyid al-Shuhada, and the Badr Organisation had been sent to Iran.

The troops were reportedly transported through the border crossings of Shalamcheh, Chazabeh, and Khosravi, officially under the cover of a "pilgrimage to the holy sites of Imam Reza in Mashhad", while in practice they were gathered at a base in Ahvaz before being dispatched to various regions to assist in suppressing protests. According to Iran International, "The reason behind this move by the Islamic Republic could be its concern that the Iranian police might not follow orders to attack unarmed, ordinary people, or simply because its forces are insufficient to stop protests in more than 100 cities".

On 9 January 2026, the United States warned Iran against using foreign militias to crush protests. According to The Media Line, Iraqi militia members were recruited to help suppress Iranian protesters, receiving $600 each. By 11 January, more than 60 buses, each carrying about 50 people, had crossed the Iran–Iraq border. On 14 January, a source told IHRNGO that the security forces in the Kurdish regions of Iran during the killings did not speak Persian, while in Karaj, an eyewitness said the forces spoke Arabic and took selfies with the bodies. On 15 January, an Iraqi source stated to CNN that "nearly 5,000" fighters from Iraqi militias had crossed into Iran over the preceding weeks.

=== Concealment of deaths through mass graves and burials ===
On 27 January, The Guardian reported that the Islamic Republic was concealing protest deaths through mass graves and burials.

=== Minors killed during protests ===
According to a report by the Coordination Council of Iranian Teachers' Trade Associations, the number of students who have lost their lives during the nationwide protests in Iran has exceeded 160.

=== Persecution ===
On 5 January 2026, Gholamhossein Mohseni Ejei, head of the judiciary in the Islamic Republic, stated that there would be no leniency for "rioters" despite the right to demonstrate, and the judiciary's Mizan News Agency quoted him saying "I instruct the attorney general and prosecutors across the country to act in accordance with the law and with resolve against the rioters and those who support them (...) and to show no leniency or indulgence", and stressing that the penalty would be "decisive" and "maximum".

Regarding the rapid trials and executions of protesters, Iran state television shared a video in which Mohseni-Ejei said, "If we want to do a job, we should do it now. If we want to do something, we have to do it quickly, if it becomes late, two months, three months later, it doesn't have the same effect. If we want to do something, we have to do that fast."

On 10 January, Supreme Leader Ali Khamenei said that the demands of protesters in the country are "completely fair", but "rioters" should "be put in their place". On 13 January, in a televised statement from the office of the Tehran prosecutor, the office declared that an undeclared number of protesters would be charged with "moharebeh", or "waging war against God", an offence punished by death in Iran, and used extensively in the past by the regime's judiciary. According to the Human Rights Activists News Agency, as of 14 January 2026, over 18,400 people had been arrested. By 18 January, HRANA reported that 24,669 protesters had been detained.

According to Iran International, on 10 January 2026 the "One Word" lawyers' network, citing the internet shutdown isolating protesters from the outside world, called on the international community and Iranian judges to prevent the show trials and extrajudicial executions of protesters following the orders of Ali Khamenei and senior judicial officials.

In its statement, the network detailed new orders from Khamenei instructing security forces "to deal harshly with protesters in recent gatherings" as well as separate statements from the Head of the Judiciary, the Attorney General of the country, and the Tehran Prosecutor calling for "extraordinary, out-of-order proceedings and the imposition of the most severe punishments in the cases of detained protesters". On 18 January, The Guardian reported detainees were being subjected to torture and sexual assault while in custody, while Iran International reported detainees were being injected with unknown chemical substances.

==== Torture and sexual violence ====
On 18 January, The Guardian reported a rights group's claim that detainees were being subjected to torture and sexual assault while in custody, while Iran International reported detainees were being injected with unknown chemical substances. Reports from KHRN (a French-based human rights organisation) cited by Iran International, claimed that two protesters were abused while in detention during Iran's nationwide unrest in the city of Kermanshah. One of those detained was a minor. According to these accounts, security personnel subjected the detainees to sexualised physical mistreatment during their transfer, including beatings and the use of batons through their clothing and over their anal areas. Reports also stated imprisoned protesters were being tortured and raped, while women's bodies were being returned to their families with missing wombs in order to hide the crimes.

==== Executions ====
According to rights group HRANA, Iran carried out at least 52 executions during the protests between 5 and 14 January. According to the BBC, on 8 January 2026, clothes shop owner Erfan Soltani was arrested in his home for being connected with the protests in Fardis. He was denied a lawyer and his family was not notified of the charges brought against him. Several days later, Soltani was notified that he was to face execution on 14 January, less than a week after his arrest.

Shortly before the execution date, Iranian Foreign Minister Abbas Araghchi denied any plans to hang people, and Soltani's family was notified that his execution had been postponed, while the judiciary stated that the charges against him only consisted of "colluding against national security" and "propaganda activities against the establishment" which are not punishable by death in Iran. The state broadcasting company IRIB claimed that reports of Soltani's pending execution were a "blatant act of news fabrication".

US president Donald Trump thanked the regime for promising to stop the 800 planned executions; however, Ali Salehi, State Prosecutor in Tehran, was seen on state television saying "Trump says a lot of nonsense and gibberish", and "Our reaction will be forceful, preventive and swift. Indictments have been issued for numerous cases and sent to courts."

Government officials said on 18 January that it may proceed with executing people arrested during the protests. Iran's judiciary chief, Gholamhossein Mohseni Ejei, stated that carrying out the sentences quickly would serve as a deterrent. On 17 January, another protester, 19-year-old Amirhossein Ghaderzadeh, was sentenced to death by hanging, with his execution scheduled for 21 January. On 20 January, reports circulated that the Iran Human Rights Society (IHRS) said that an Iranian conscript named Javid Khales had been sentenced to death after refusing an order to fire on protesters and that he was being held in Isfahan Prison, though this has not been independently verified. On 22 January, 33-year-old Ali Rahbar was reportedly executed in Mashhad, becoming one of the first protesters to be executed. Iran's judiciary denied his execution having taken place, stating that such a person had not even been detained. On 23 January, Mohammad Abbasi, a protester from Malard was sentenced to death, and his daughter was sentenced to 25 years in jail.

According to activists, human rights advocates, and foreign intelligence, the Islamic Republic secretly executed jailed protesters while disguising the deaths as protest casualties and suicides. There were also reports of detainees being injected with unknown substances, leading to their deaths. On 6 February, The Independent reported that secret executions of detained protesters had taken place in Tehran, Isfahan, Shiraz, and Mashhad, and that mass executions were being planned by the Islamic Republic once negotiations with the United States end. On 9 February, it was reported that the Islamic Republic was pressuring the families of detainees to attend pro-government rallies planned for 22 Bahman (11 February), marking the anniversary of the 1979 Islamic Revolution, telling them that only if they complied and attended would their detained relatives be spared execution or have their sentences reduced.

A 19-year-old protester was reported to have been shot in the head after spending approximately a month in custody.

On 16 February, an Iranian court sentenced fourteen protesters to death in a court case held online. On 16 February, it was also reported that the Islamic Republic had issued death sentences for at least sixteen detained protesters, with multiple detainees stating they had been tortured and were compelled to sign forced confessions. On 18 February, an Iranian court sentenced to death three brothers from Shahinshahr who had been arrested during the protests. On 20 February, another seven protesters - including a 19-year old - were sentenced to death.

Norway-based rights group Hengaw stated the cases are marred by due process violations. HRANA stated on 9 February that 51,790 had been arrested, while Iran International added that many are facing serious charges.

Reports also indicated detained protesters were being brutally tortured and raped before being killed in prison, including women's bodies being returned to their families with missing wombs in order to hide the crimes.

On 19 March, three more protesters were executed, including teenage wrestler Saleh Mohammadi. On 2 April, another protester, 18-year-old Amir Hossein Hatami, was executed. On 5 April, two more protesters were executed.

On 13 May, one man was executed after being accused of killing a police officer during the protests. According to HRANA, the regime didn't allow him access to an independent lawyer.

On 25 May, Abbas Akbari Feizabadi, who had been arrested in connection with the January protests, was executed. According to state media, he had been accused of attacking a county government building; Iran Human Rights described him as the fifteenth protester executed in connection with the January protests since 19 March. On 1 June, Ashkan Maleki and Mehrdad Mohammadinia, two Kurdish protesters from Qorveh who had been arrested during the protests, were executed at Ghezel Hesar Prison. Their executions were carried out without advance notice to their families or a final family visit. They had been convicted in a case involving the burning of a mosque and seminary in Tehran and alleged actions against national security.

On 3 June, Iran Human Rights reported that Fathollah Avari, a 42-year-old protester arrested in connection with the demonstrations in Hamadan, had been executed. The judiciary did not disclose the date of the execution, while Iran Human Rights identified the location as Hamadan Central Prison. State media had broadcast Avari's self-incriminating statements shortly after his arrest; he had been convicted of qisas in connection with the killing of a police officer during the 8 January protests. On 16 June, Javad Zamani and Abolfazl Saedi, who had been detained in connection with the 8 January protests in Shahroud, were executed in Semnan Province. They had been sentenced to death on charges including moharebeh, efsad-fil-arz, arson and offences against national security. State media broadcast their self-incriminating statements when announcing their executions.

On 15 July, Mohammad Amini Dehaghani, who had been detained over the protests in Dehaqan, Isfahan Province, was executed. State media said that he had been convicted of moharebeh and efsad-fil-arz and accused him of acts including blocking roads, setting fire to the Dehaqan governor's office and damaging public property. Iran Human Rights said that no independent information about his case had been available before the announcement of his execution. On 19 July, Erfan Esfandiari and Gol Mohammad Mohammadi, an Afghan national, were executed at Isfahan Central Prison in connection with the 8 January protests at Alikhani Square. According to unofficial reports cited by Iran Human Rights, Esfandiari was 18 and Mohammadi was 23; the organisation said that it had been unable to independently verify Esfandiari's exact age at the time of the alleged offence. They were accused of involvement in the deaths of four security personnel and in arson and property destruction during the protests.

On 22 July, Mehdi Khanaki was executed after being sentenced to death in connection with the January protests in Karaj. State authorities accused him of links to the People's Mojahedin Organization of Iran and of possessing weapons and carrying out activities on behalf of Israel, the United States and other groups. Iran Human Rights reported allegations that he had been tortured and said his Revolutionary Court proceedings had failed to meet minimum fair-trial standards.

On 28 July, Abolfazl Sepahi Badjani, 25, and Amirhossein Safari Hosseinabadi, 28, were publicly hanged in Alikhani Square in Isfahan, where the offences of which they had been convicted were alleged to have occurred. Safari Hosseinabadi had a physical disability and had lost the use of his left hand following an earlier accident. A large group gathered at the site before the executions in an attempt to prevent them; reports and videos indicated that security forces confronted the gathering and that several people were arrested. Iran Human Rights described the hangings as the first recorded public executions in Iran in 2026.

On 16 August, Shahram Sadeghi was executed at Ghezel Hesar Prison. He had been accused of deliberately driving a vehicle into security forces during the 8 January protests in Karaj, injuring seven officers. Iran Human Rights reported that his self-incriminating statements were broadcast on state media before legal proceedings against him had begun and described them as torture-tainted.

On 20 August, Ghaem (Arian) Hosseini, a 21-year-old Afghan national, was executed at Isfahan Central Prison. He was the fifth defendant and the second Afghan national executed in the Alikhani Square case. Hosseini had originally been scheduled to be publicly executed on 28 July together with other defendants, but his execution had been halted at that time for unspecified reasons.

On 23 August, Majid Adineh, who had been arrested in Karaj on the evening of 9 January, was executed. The judiciary initially did not disclose the location of the execution; Iran Human Rights subsequently identified it as Karaj Central Prison. State media accused Adineh of offences including moharebeh, acting on behalf of Israel, the United States and other groups, and possessing weapons. Iran Human Rights said that no independent information concerning his case had been available before his execution and identified him as the 29th protester executed in connection with the December 2025–January 2026 protests since 19 March.

On 3 October, Iran's judiciary announced the execution of Siavash Jamshidi Kheirabadi, arrested during January's protests in Shahrekord and sentenced to death for allegedly firing at security forces. No details of his prosecution had been made public before the announcement, and authorities did not disclose his lawyer, court, judgment, defense details, or the time and place of his execution.

=== Death sentences and prison terms for protesters ===
On 20 February, Amnesty International said that it had documented at least 30 people facing the death penalty for alleged offences related to the January protests. Eight had already been sentenced to death within weeks of their arrests, while at least 22 others, including two 17-year-olds, were undergoing or awaiting proceedings on capital charges. Amnesty International said the cases involved serious violations of fair-trial rights, including the use of torture-tainted confessions, incommunicado detention and denial of access to independent lawyers.

In Yazd, Kaveh Arabian, Ali Daneshparvar and Esmail Ramezanpour were sentenced to death by Branch One of the Yazd Revolutionary Court on charges of moharebeh in cases connected with the January protests. Arabian, a new father, was arrested at his cousin's home on 12 January and held for 68 days in an Islamic Revolutionary Guard Corps intelligence detention facility, where Iran Human Rights reported that he was subjected to pressure to make self-incriminating statements. Daneshparvar, 33, was arrested on 9 January and was reportedly held in solitary confinement for approximately three months. Arabian's sentence was subsequently upheld by Branch Nine of the Supreme Court. On 28 July, one day after a visit with his parents, wife and infant child, he was transferred from Yazd Central Prison to an undisclosed location, prompting fears that his execution was imminent. At that time, Daneshparvar's and Ramezanpour's cases were still awaiting a decision from the Supreme Court.

In Shiraz, Mojtaba Dehbandi, 23, and Kianush Hamzezadeh-Kazerouni, 27, were sentenced to death by Branch One of the Shiraz Revolutionary Court. They faced charges including moharebeh in connection with allegations of arson and acting against national security. Iran Human Rights reported that the two men had brought several protesters injured during the demonstrations into a shop to receive medical treatment. Dehbandi worked in a curtain shop with his brother and Hamzezadeh-Kazerouni was a grocer; both were being held in Adel Abad Central Prison in Shiraz.

On 21 July, Iran Human Rights reported that more than 70 protesters arrested in connection with the January protests were facing execution in Isfahan Central Prison, with 26 being held in pre-execution solitary-confinement cells or isolation suites. The organisation had identified 31 of them; at least one had been under 18 at the time of the alleged offence, three others were suspected of having been under 18, and three were Afghan nationals. It also reported that families had been threatened and pressured not to publicise the cases.

Excluding defendants whose subsequent executions are described in the preceding section, those identified by Iran Human Rights included Alireza Raisi, 22; Alireza Sepahi, 25; Amirhossein Maleki, 20; Abolfazl Ebrahimi, 18 or 19; Amirhossein Ebrahimi, 20; Shervin Bagherian, 18 or 19; Alireza Dashti, 20; Javad Talebpour; Mehdi Eskandari, 28; Sepehr Hounjani, 17 or 18; Mehran Seyedzadeh; Mansour Jafari, 17; Shahin Soleimani, 23; Hossein Ghaleh Beigi, 22; Reza Moazeni, 23; Yaser Mokhtari, 23; Moslem Heidari, 30; Ramezan Asadi; Abolfazl Hashemian; Daniel Harouni; Navid Shirani; Seyed Reza Hassanlu; Davoud Aminzadeh; Mobin Soltani; and Pejman Haghighan. Iran Human Rights said that Ebrahimi, Bagherian and Hounjani may have been under 18 at the time of the alleged offences. It also reported that the other people arrested in connection with the so-called Alikhani Square case received prison sentences ranging from five to ten years.

Mehran Seyedzadeh was sentenced to death in a case concerning the deaths of two IRGC members during the protests. According to an informed source cited by Iran Human Rights, he was held incommunicado for approximately three months and subjected to torture that broke his right arm and two teeth in an attempt to obtain self-incriminating statements. He was subsequently tried without a lawyer, and his death sentence was upheld by the Supreme Court. Afshar Shah Ahmadi, Iman Shafayi and Sadreddin Ahmadzadeh, three Afghan nationals arrested on 10 January, were also sentenced to death in connection with the burning of a police station. Iran Human Rights reported that they had been held incommunicado by the Ministry of Intelligence for 40 days. Shafayi had a pre-existing respiratory illness that reportedly deteriorated during detention, and the organisation said that he had been denied adequate medical care.

In September, The Guardian reported that twin sisters Taraneh and Romina Rahimi, both aged 20, had been sentenced after being detained following their participation in the January protests in Isfahan. According to relatives interviewed by the newspaper, their mother did not learn where they were being held for approximately four months. Taraneh was sentenced to death, while Romina received a 25-year prison sentence. Their relatives alleged that the sisters had been severely beaten and tortured in detention and that Taraneh made a confession after threats were made against her sister. Their mother was not permitted to attend the trial.

=== Suicide and psychological harm ===
In the months following the crackdown, reports emerged of suicides and suicide attempts among relatives and loved ones of people killed during the protests. In September 2026, Iran International reported that Aida Heydari, 25, the fiancée of Abolfazl Soleimani Alamouti, died by suicide on 3 September. Soleimani Alamouti had been shot and killed during protests in Zibashahr, Qazvin Province, on 9 January. According to the family, the couple had planned to marry in September 2026.

Danial Karimi, the father of Amir-Mohammad Karimi, died by suicide on 6 September. Amir-Mohammad Karimi, 19, a former member of Iran's national junior taekwondo team, had been shot and killed during protests in Marvdasht on 9 January and was later buried in the nearby village of Joonjan.

In an earlier case, Farahnaz "Atefeh" Roozfarah, the mother of Saman Ebrahimpour, died by suicide on 16 July after months of mourning. She was 38 and was buried in Shaft, Gilan Province. Ebrahimpour had been killed during the January protests. Iran International also cited journalist Maryam Shokrani as reporting that Tahereh Jangjoo, the mother of Raha Bohloulipour, developed severe depression following her daughter's death and survived at least one suicide attempt.

=== Treatment of corpses ===
On 11 January 2026, a video circulated online showing grieving relatives at the Kahrizak Forensic Medical Center near Tehran, where rows of body bags were laid out inside and outside a warehouse for identification. NBC News geolocated the footage to the facility, but said it could not determine when the video had been filmed or how the people shown in the body bags had died. In these videos, the bodies of hundreds of men in black bags are seen in several sheds and buildings of the Kahrizak morgue, as well as on the ground in the outdoor area. Only some of them have been identified; several bodies show gunshot wounds to the head, abdomen, and chest. In one video, photos of the bodies and the names of the deceased are visible on a monitor—apparently belonging to the morgue's computer system—while another video shows a truck from which people are unloading corpses.

One notable detail in these videos is the absence of female victims, who, according to information in the footage, are kept in a separate hall. In one segment, a member of the medical staff mentions that before the bodies of women are released, the uterus must be opened, which appears to be a routine procedure for issuing death certificates.

According to estimates by HRANA, there were approximately 250 bodies in the Kahrizak morgue alone.

According to reports and witness testimonies, the bodies of protesters were treated in an inhuman and degrading manner. Corpses were dumped from refrigerated trucks onto the ground and often piled on top of each other. Grieving families were forced to search among the piles to find their loved ones. Some families reportedly had to pay exorbitant sums, up to $6,000, to receive the bodies, while many other remains were moved to mass graves. Cemetery staff handled the bodies with carelessness and disrespect; children in small bags were thrown on top of other corpses, sometimes being crushed beneath them. Authorities controlled the burial sites and restricted mourning rituals to prevent further protests, while security forces monitored families even during their final farewells.

On 27 February, a family received the body of a protester who had been missing for about 50 days. The body had signs of gunshots and strikes from a butcher's cleaver.

== Timeline ==
The protests began peacefully on 28 December, following the closure of shops in Tehran due to unease at economic conditions. On 30 December, which was the third day of protests, three protesters were killed: Amirhesam Khodayarifard from Kuhdasht, Dariush Ansari Bakhtiariwand from Fuladshahr, and Khodadad Shirvani from Marvdasht. On the fourth day, which was 31 December, seven protesters were killed during the demonstrations, including 28-year-old barber Shayan Asadollahi. The next day, 1 January, funeral ceremonies were held in Kuhdasht, Fuladshahr, and Marvdasht under severe scrutiny of security forces while nationwide protests continued. Circulated video footage showed a protester lying in the street in Qom with severe chest and arm injuries; the video was widely shared and described as showing a protester killed by a grenade. The following day, 2 January, during protests in Malekshahi, Ilam province, at least five people were killed by gunfire from security forces, and at least 30 others were hospitalized, several in critical condition.

The UN Special Rapporteur on the situation of human rights in Iran expressed concern over the killing of eight protesters during recent demonstrations. An early report by the IRGC Nabi Akram Public Relations Office reported that a Basij member, Ali Azizi, was killed in Harsin County, Kermanshah province. A later report by Hengaw stated that Ali Azizi Jafarabadi, a 42-year-old Kurd with a wife and two children, had been shot by government security forces.

On 8 January, the protest situation intensified, with a major internet blackout obstructing the reporting of injuries and deaths. Six hospitals in Tehran recorded 217 deaths of protesters, mostly as a result of shots from live ammunition. Hospitals were in crisis mode, with a hospital in Shiraz lacking enough surgeons to treat the injured. In a protest in Kermanshah, five protesters were killed by gunfire by government security forces and ten members of the Kermanshah Nabi Akram Corps were killed. The following day, 9 January, hospitals in Iran were mostly in crisis mode trying to handle injured and dead protesters. In Rasht, 70 bodies arrived at 2026 Rasht massacre at Poursina Hospital in Gilan province.

On 10 January, Iran International estimated that 2,000 protesters had been killed over the preceding 48 hours. As reports started emerging about the numbers of protesters killed since the 8 January internet cutoff, Al Monitor described the killings as constituting "a 'massacre'", based on human rights organisations' reports. Activists estimated that at least 538 protesters had been killed. HRANA counted 483 confirmed protester deaths, one prosecutor death, 47 security force deaths, and 579 deaths that HRANA was still investigating. The Center for Human Rights in Iran estimated 490 protester deaths as of 11 January. The Washington Post described the Center for Human Rights in Iran as "[having] a record of issuing conservative estimates of deaths in previous protests". On 12 January, Time quoted an estimate by a group of Iranian expatriate academics and professionals of a possible total of 6,000 protester deaths up to and including 10 January, excluding those of protesters whose bodies were taken directly to morgues, and not to hospitals. Reports indicating that the massacres, as a whole, are likely the largest Iranian massacre in the twenty-first century emerged on 13 January.

On 12 January, Foreign Ministry spokesman Ismail Baghaei acknowledged that protesters had been directly fired upon, while attributing the shooting to the protesters themselves.

On 13 January, Iran International estimated that 12,000 protesters had been killed on 8 and 9 January, based on one source "close to" the Iranian Supreme National Security Council, two sources from the office of the Presidency, sources from the IRGC in three different cities, eyewitness and family reports, and reports from medical centres, doctors and nurses. Based on medical reports, activist groups in Iran told CBS that they estimated at least 12,000 deaths and possibly 20,000. HRANA updated its count of confirmed protester deaths to 2,403, including 12 minors, it updated the security force death count to 147, and counted nine deaths of people who were neither protesters nor military personnel. An unnamed Iranian official told Reuters that the number of deaths of protesters and security forces together was 2,000. The official claimed that both the protesters and security forces had been killed by terrorists.

IHRNGO reported its own confirmed account of 3,379 protesters killed from 8 to 12 January, and 3,428 in total, most of whom were under the age of 30. IHRNGO stated that the Iran International estimate of 12,000 protester deaths and CBS estimate of possibly 20,000 were difficult to verify because of the Internet cutoff, and that IHRNGO was working to verify the reports. IHRNGO stated that the killings in Karaj in Alborz province were carried out with DShK machine guns. Witnesses said that the perpetrators "were speaking Arabic" and that the perpetrators took selfie photos with the bodies. One of IHRNGO's sources stated that the security forces in the Kurdish regions of Iran during the killings did not speak Persian. A consistent claim in reporting is that families were required by the authorities to pay for each bullet that had killed a family member, which can range from 700 million Iranian rials to 2.5 billion rials (about $480 to $1,720) per bullet, depending on the particular case. (Note: This practice has been used by the Iranian authorities in early crackdowns on political unrest)

On 20 January, the Canadian NGO International Centre for Human Rights stated an estimate of 43,000 deaths from the protests, based on its "comprehensive review of images, videos, and received reports, ... and interviews with a credible source within Iran's public health system, additional independent sources, and further documentation review".

The second wave of protests began on 21 February, led by students at several universities. On 24 February, Basij members and security forces attacked student protesters on the fourth day across multiple universities.

On 13 March, the IRGC threatened a crackdown bigger than the one in January if protests restarted.

== Disinformation ==
=== False Basij membership: Amirhesam Khodayarifard ===
One of the first government claims of a killed protester having been a Basij member during these protests was the case of Amirhesam Khodayarifard. On 31 December 2025, Amirhesam Khodayarifard, born in 2004, was participating in one of the protests, in the city of Kuhdasht. The group of protesters had spent hours peacefully demonstrating and chanting against the government. The crowd moved towards Imam Square, where a statue of Ruhollah Khomeini is located. Stones were thrown at the statue. Basij, police officers and plainclothes security officers started firing their weapons. Khodayarifard was shot in the head by a plainclothes security agent according to IranWire. Video footage and eyewitnesses stated Khodayarifard was among the protesters when he was shot.

After the shooting, Khodayarifard was transferred to medical facilities in Khorramabad, where he died several hours later. According to IranWire, locals alleged that Ebrahim Aharoun, a retired IRGC member in plainclothes during the protest, was the person who shot Khodayarifard.

Government-affiliated media claimed that Khodayarifard was a Basij member, and that his death was the result of "violent actions by protesters". The governor of Kuhdasht, an Imam of Friday Prayer, Ali Emami-Rad (a member of the Iranian Parliament), and the IRGC visited the home of Khodayarifard's family several times, pressuring the family and conditioning the release of the body on the requirement that the family state that Khodayarifard had been a Basij member. Images of Khodayarifard in military clothing were circulated by government supporters on online social media to support the claim that he had been a Basij member. The pressure on the family included "a mix of inducements and threats". Visits to the family home included cameras, aiming to record the family's statement.

The family, including Khodayarifard's mother, refused to state that Amirhesam Khodayarifard had been a Basij member. Khodayarifard's father stated that his son was a protester, not a Basij member. Worldwide media reported the government's Basij member claim widely.

Iran International stated on 2 January 2026 that Khodayarifard's funeral had been held on 1 January in Kuhdasht amid a heavy security presence, and that the ceremony had taken place in a tense atmosphere, with pressure and disruptions from security forces and government-affiliated agents. On 5 January, IranWire stated that Khodayarifard's body had not yet been returned to his family.

== Analysis ==
The New York Times viewed the scale of the 2026 massacres as the greatest in "many decades", and as a sign that Iranian government leaders viewed the existence of the Islamic Republic regime to be at risk.

An analysis from The Guardian viewed Iranian elites as showing signs of dissent against the massacres and other repressive measures, suggesting that the repression was having an unstabilising rather than stabilising effect on the political system.

Amnesty International reported that security forces, including the IRGC and police, used live ammunition, metal pellet shotguns, tear gas, and beatings, and noted that a nationwide internet blackout from 8 January hindered independent monitoring of the events.

Human Rights Watch described a coordinated escalation in the use of lethal force and mass killings across multiple provinces, emphasizing that these actions targeted protesters even in areas where no immediate threat existed.

In an article for The Atlantic published following the killing of Khamenei, Karim Sadjadpour portrayed the massacres as "one of the deadliest episodes of state violence in modern history."

A study has indicated that members of the Iranian diaspora were deeply affected by the massacres despite being far away physically and it had a major effect on their lives as a whole.

== Reactions ==
=== Iranian government ===
A supposed state affiliated analyst has defended the killings, framing them as a 'holy duty'.

The Supreme Leader of Iran however acknowledged these deaths and said that 'thousands were killed in an inhumane and savage manner' which he blames it upon the rioters and US-Israeli agents.

IRGC intelligence chief Majid Khademi claimed that "foreign agents" instructed protesters to shoot each other in order to increase the death count and increase the chances of an American attack.

On 23 February 2026, former Iranian president Mohammad Khatami expressed sympathy with the families of the victims and wishing a speedy recovery for the injured, and he called for the release of those arrested solely for protesting and social helplessness. He also emphasized the need for clear and credible explanations of the incidents, identifying the culprits, halting arrests, summonses, and the issuance of inappropriate verdicts against intellectuals, artists, and political activists. The former president of Iran expressed hope that university issues would be resolved with wisdom and calm, without political, security, or social violence. He also regarded the upcoming negotiations between Iran and the U.S. as important and expressed hope that these talks would lead to a reduction in the problems and threats faced by the people of Iran and the region. Contrary to the goals of regional adversaries, Khatami hoped that a path of peace, progress, and regional security would be pursued.

=== Human rights groups ===
On 14 January 2026, Amnesty International called for international institutional actions to prevent repeats of the massacre. Six months after the massacres, on 8 July, Amnesty International stated that the international community had failed to "pursue justice" and called for an Iran-specific "independent international justice mechanism" to be created and for the situation in Iran to be referred to the International Criminal Court.

International Commission of Jurists (ICJ) condemned the killings and called for an independent investigation into the events.

International Federation for Human Rights (FIDH) said that the Iranian regime "must be held accountable" for the massacres.

On 16 September 2026, Amnesty International reported that the Iranian regime coordinated the killing, torture, and sexual abuse of protesters and bystanders during the crackdown on Mahsa Amini protests, and Tehran's suppression of 2025–2026 Iranian protests bore the "same hallmarks" but on a larger scale.

=== Eyewitness accounts and other Iranian reactions ===
Eyewitness accounts described the crackdown with words such as "war situation," "massacre," "bloodbath," and "apocalypse."

A group of Iranian reformists called for an independent investigation into the death toll.

A group of more than 90 Iranian cultural figures based abroad condemned the killings and warned of the possibility that detainees might be executed.

=== Abroad ===
US President Donald Trump encouraged protesters, and threatened several times to strike Iran if the Iranian security forces continued to kill protesters. During the 2026 State of the Union Address, Trump said that 32,000 protesters had been killed. During the 2026 Iran war, Trump said that those involved in perpetrating the massacres would be "tried and executed." Trump said that regime change would happen, but "maybe not immediately," citing the massacres as one of the major obstacles. Following Pope Leo's criticism of the Iran war, Trump called on the pope to call out Iran for the massacre of "42,000 unarmed protesters." In July 20, 2026, post on Truth Social, Trump claimed that Iran had killed "52,000 innocent protestors".

The European Union and Ukraine designated the Islamic Revolutionary Guard Corps as a terrorist organization in response to the crackdown on protesters. The United Kingdom is expected to follow suit.

The Australian government imposed sanctions on twenty Iranian people and three organizations in response to the Iranian government's "horrific use of violence against its own people." The Australian Senate also passed a motion condemning the crackdown on protesters.

The British government also sanctioned ten Iranian people as well as the security forces group.

European countries including Finland, France, Germany, Italy, Netherlands, Portugal, Spain, and United Kingdom, have summoned their Iranian ambassador to condemn the killings.

Canada's foreign ministry condemned the killing of protesters and the use of violence after a video emerged showing a car running over protesters.

The United Nations General Assembly adopted a resolution condemning the widespread violence. United Nations Secretary-General António Guterres said that he was "shocked" by reports of excessive violence by Iranian forces and said that the right to protest must be protected.

== See also ==
- Chain murders of Iran
- 1981–1982 Iran massacres
- 1988 executions of Iranian political prisoners
- Black Friday (1978)
- Cinema Rex fire
- Deaths during the Mahsa Amini protests
- Death sentence of Erfan Soltani
- Human rights in the Islamic Republic of Iran
- List of massacres in Iran
- Politics of Iran
- 2026 United States military buildup in the Middle East
  - 2026 Iran war
- United Nations Human Rights Council resolution on Iran (January 2026)
