= 2026 United States military buildup in the Middle East =

- Part of the Prelude to the 2026 Iran war and Middle Eastern crisis (2023–present)
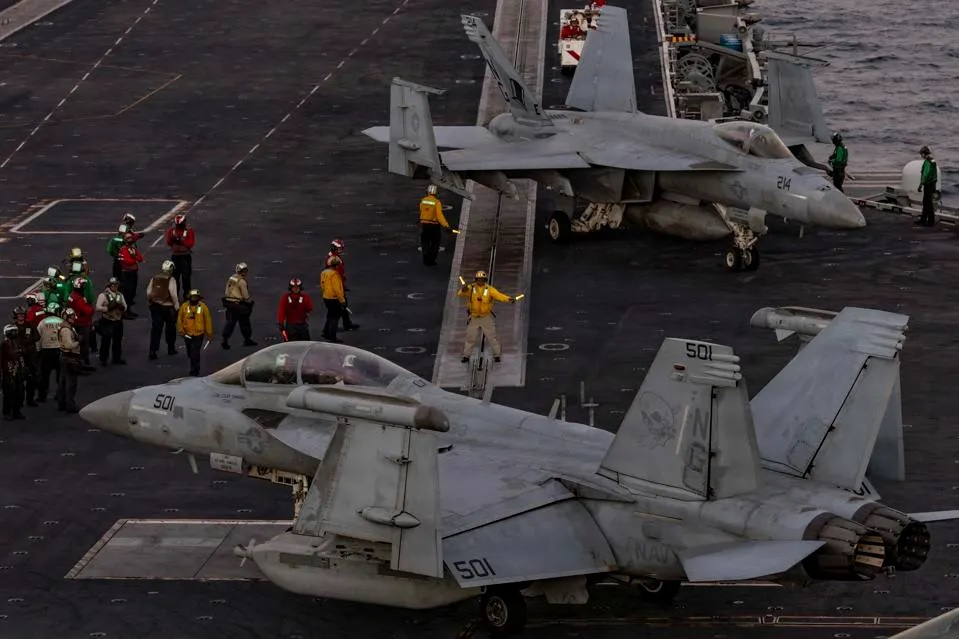
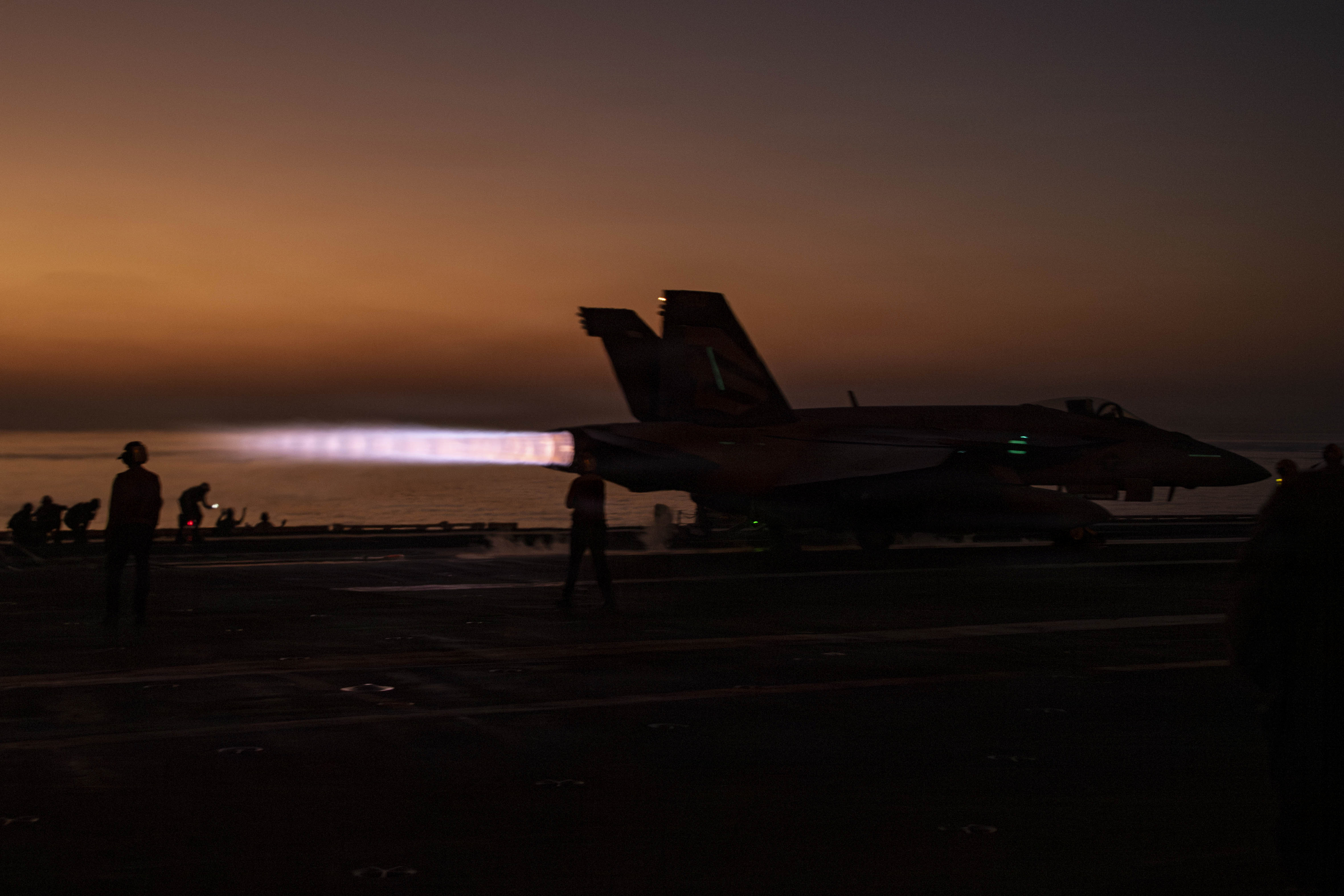
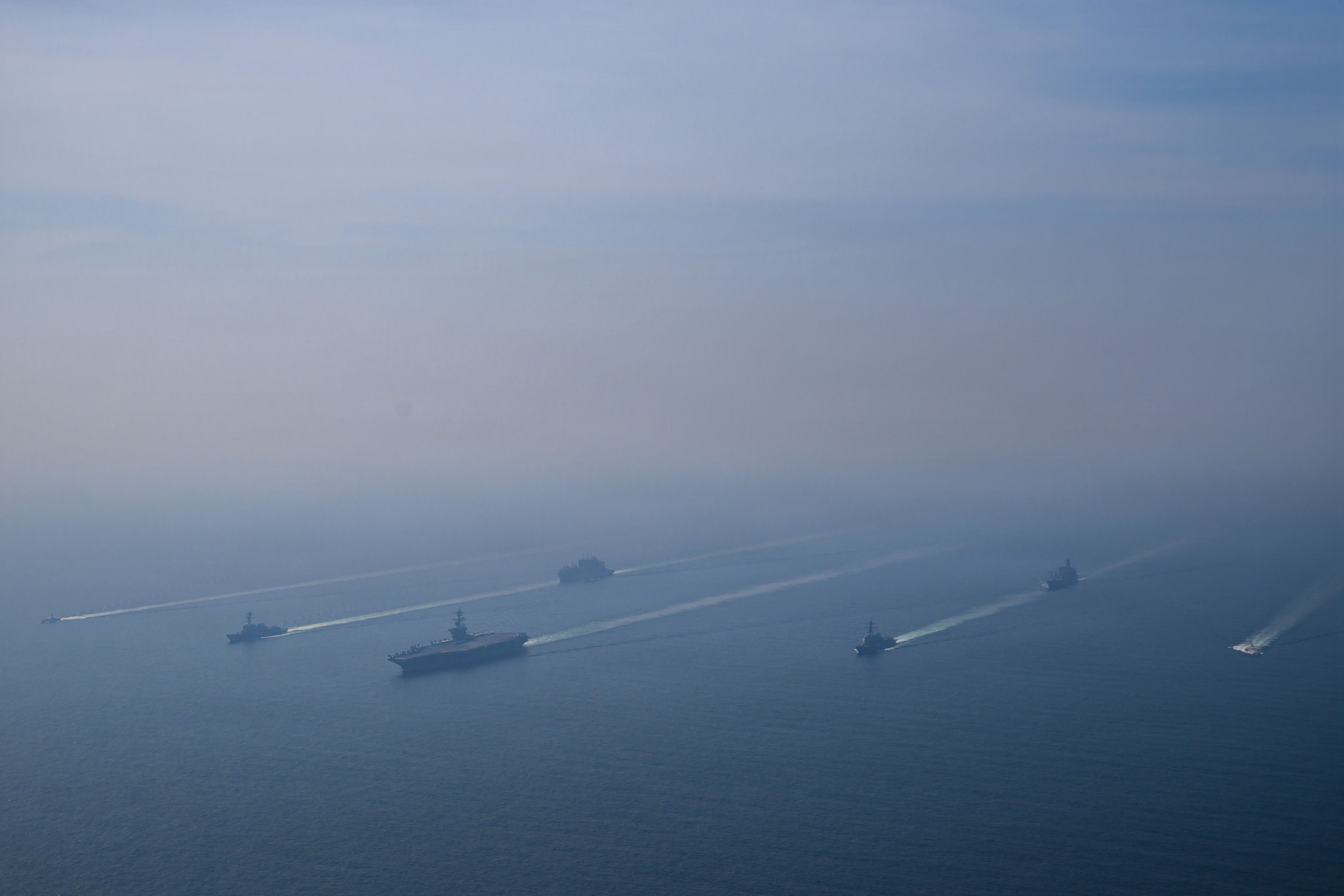
- An EA-18G Growler on the flight deck of USS Abraham Lincoln (left); An F/A-18E/F Super Hornet launches from USS Abraham Lincoln during routine flight operations (right); Carrier Strike Group 3 sails in formation in the Arabian Sea, 6 February 2026 (bottom)
- Location: Middle East
- Commanded by: (President of the United States) Donald Trump (United States) Pete Hegseth (United States) Brad Cooper
- Objective: Prevent further killings of protesters during the 2025–2026 Iranian protests; Prevent and dismantle supposed weapons of mass destruction in Iran; Prepare for strikes on Iran; Regime change in Iran
- Date: January 26, 2026 – present (9 months, 3 weeks and 2 days)
- Executed by: United States: United States Department of Defense; United States Central Command (CENTCOM); United States Armed Forces; United States Navy; Carrier Strike Group 3; Carrier Strike Group 12; Carrier Strike Group 10; Naval Special Warfare Development Group (DEVGRU); United States Navy SEALs; United States Air Force; United States Marine Corps; 31st Marine Expeditionary Unit; 11th Marine Expeditionary Unit; United States Army; 82nd Airborne Division; 101st Airborne Division; 10th Mountain Division; 160th Special Operations Aviation Regiment; Delta Force; US Army Rangers; United States Army Special Forces
- Outcome: 2026 Iran war

Beginning in late January 2026, the United States carried out its largest military buildup in the Middle East since the 2003 invasion of Iraq, deploying air, naval, and missile defense assets amid escalating tensions with Iran, which the United States has attributed to Iran's nuclear program, the 2025–2026 Iranian protests, and a government crackdown that killed thousands of demonstrators. On 28 February 2026, this culminated in a series of joint military strikes in Iran by the United States and Israel, sparking the 2026 Iran war.

Trump held off from immediate military intervention for the protesters, reportedly due to pressure from Israel and the Gulf Arab states and as an apparent reaction to Iranian officials holding off on carrying out executions of prisoners arrested after protests. The planning for a proposed series of attacks also started in co-ordination with Israeli intelligence agencies. In late January, Gulf states reportedly blocked military base and airspace access to the US over fears of Iranian retaliation.

Assets deployed included the US Navy's Carrier Strike Group 3 and Carrier Strike Group 12, led by USS Abraham Lincoln and USS Gerald R. Ford respectively. These groups support cruise missiles, F-35C Lightning II and F/A-18E Super Hornet fighters, and other aircraft. The US Air Force deployed additional F-22 Raptor and F-15E Strike Eagle fighters to bases in Israel and Jordan respectively, as well as large numbers of tanker aircraft.

On 31 March 2026, Carrier Strike Group 10 departed Naval Station Norfolk for deployment to the Middle East, following ongoing combat operations by the US towards Iran. The Carrier Strike Group had arrived in CENTCOM's area of responsibility on April 23, 2026, bringing the amount of Carrier Strike Group's in the area to 3. This is the first time in decades since three aircraft carriers were operating in the Middle East.

== Background ==
=== Iran's nuclear program ===
The United States has maintained a military presence in the Middle East since the early Cold War era, expanding it significantly after the Gulf War and the 2003 invasion of Iraq, maintaining military facilities across at least nineteen sites in the Middle East, in countries including Bahrain, Iraq, Jordan, Kuwait, Qatar, Saudi Arabia, and the United Arab Emirates.

In the context of the Treaty on the Non-proliferation of Nuclear Weapons, a 2006 report of the Director General of the UN Security Council demonstrated a security concern that the IAEA were at that time unable to satisfactorily demonstrate that the government of Iran's nuclear programme did not include a military nuclear dimension. In the context of the continuation of diplomatic relations, subsequent UN resolutions on the matter of the Iran Nuclear Issue were made from 2007–2010, and in 2015.

U.S. pressure on Iran intensified during Trump's first term. In May 2018, the Trump administration announced that the United States would exit the Joint Comprehensive Plan of Action and apply a policy of maximum pressure on Iran's economy, centering the strategy on comprehensive economic sanctions. On 4 February 2025, at the start of his second term, Trump signed a National Security Presidential Memorandum restoring the maximum pressure policy, directing the Department of the Treasury to impose maximum economic sanctions on Iran and the Department of State to lead a campaign aimed at driving Iranian oil exports to zero.

Some degree of limitation of the activities of the IAEA was brought into place via the Iranian government in 2021. In 2024 a statement the Iranian government official Kamal Kharrazi stated that Iran was prepared to change its policy on nuclear armament, and that Khamenei's fatwa against nuclear weapons was the only thing stopping them from doing so.

=== Escalation of tensions in 2025–2026 ===
Tensions escalated sharply in late 2025. On 28 December 2025, protests erupted after a sharp collapse of Iran's currency, amid soaring inflation and worsening living conditions, beginning with shopkeepers in Tehran's Grand Bazaar before spreading across the country. Iranian authorities responded with a crackdown, and on 8 January 2026, cut all internet access to the country. Human Rights Watch found evidence of a coordinated escalation in the use of lethal force beginning 8 January, with protesters and bystanders shot in the head and torso. The death toll remained contested due to the communications blackout. Iran's government put the figure at 3,117; human rights activists counted at least 6,126 dead, while acknowledging the true number could not be independently verified.

On 13 January, speaking in Detroit, Trump told Iranian protesters to "keep protesting" and that "help is on its way," vowing to punish security forces responsible for the killings and announcing he had canceled all meetings with Iranian officials until the crackdown stopped. The U.S. then began reinforcing its military presence in the region.

The Gang of Eight, a group of eight leaders in the US Congress who are commonly briefed on classified intelligence matters, was briefed on the attack prior to its commencement. Also at the time, Bloomberg News reported that NATO Airborne Warning and Control System (AWACS) craft were surveilling Iran out of Konya Airport, though Turkey later denied reports it was aiding US and Israeli strikes on Iran.

The Trump administration stated in February 2026 that Iran had restarted its nuclear programme and was developing missiles with enough range for an attack on the US. According to an anonymous US source, Trump authorized the strike after the US received intelligence that Iran was planning to preemptively launch missiles. The administration did not provide any evidence that Iran was planning to preemptively strike US assets, and an unspecified Pentagon source told Congress in closed-door briefings that there was no intelligence suggesting Iran was planning to attack US forces first. In March 2026, it was reported by ABC News that the U.S. "recently acquired information that as of early February 2026, Iran allegedly aspired to conduct a surprise attack using unmanned aerial vehicles from an unidentified vessel off the coast of the United States Homeland, specifically against unspecified targets in California, in the event that the US conducted strikes against Iran."

== Deployment ==
=== Pre-buildup ===
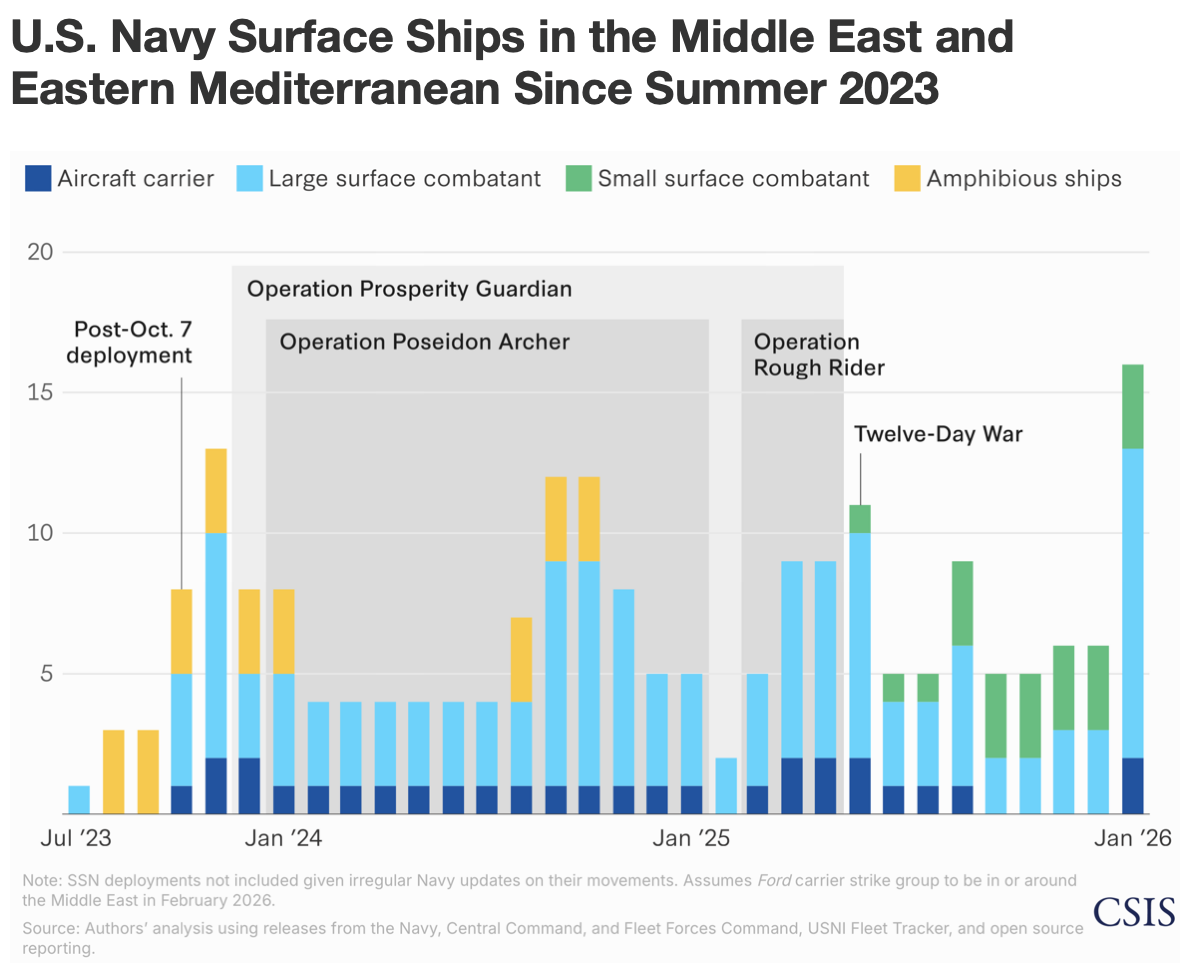
U.S. Navy ship deployments to the Middle East since 2023

Since the October 7 attacks in 2023, the United States has maintained at least one aircraft carrier in the Middle East or eastern Mediterranean, with two carriers present in the region for Operation Rough Rider from March to May of 2025. Coverage briefly lapsed in late 2025 when USS Gerald R. Ford was reassigned to the Caribbean to take part in Operation Southern Spear, but by January 2026 the US naval presence in and around the Middle East was reported to be the largest since the regional crisis began in 2023.

=== January 2026 ===
In mid-January 2026, USS Abraham Lincoln was ordered to CENTCOM's area of operations and arrived on 26 January with its strike group, including guided-missile destroyers, cruisers, support vessels, and embarked aircraft such as F/A-18E Super Hornets, EA-18G Growlers, E-2 Hawkeyes, MH-60 helicopters, and F-35C Lightning IIs.

Additional U.S naval assets reported in the region included warships positioned in the Strait of Hormuz, the Red Sea, and the Mediterranean, as well as littoral combat ships operating in the Persian Gulf. Air components were reinforced by F-15E Strike Eagle and other fighter aircraft relocated from RAF Lakenheath to Muwaffaq Salti Air Base in Jordan. Allied forces, including Eurofighter Typhoons belonging to the Royal Air Force, were also stationed at al-Udeid Air Base in Qatar.

=== February 2026 ===
Throughout February 2026, U.S. officials signaled plans for an expanded carrier presence. The Wall Street Journal and other outlets reported preparations for deploying USS George H. W. Bush, which was completing drills off the coast of Virginia and indicated additional carriers might be sent to reinforce operations.

Map of U.S. bases in the Middle East

On 13 February 2026, sources stated that USS Gerald R. Ford was en route to the Middle East, creating an uncommon two-carrier deployment in the theater at a time of heightened tensions with Iran. Reports from multiple outlets noted that this concentration of U.S. air and naval assets constituted one of the most significant force postures in the region since the 2003 invasion of Iraq. On 20 February, it was reported that the ship was seen off the coast of Gibraltar. The arrival of USS Gerald R. Ford and its strike group marks the largest deployment of naval assets to the region since five carrier battle groups assembled at the beginning of Operation Iraqi Freedom.

On 24 February 2026, it was reported that twelve F-22 fighter jets had been deployed to Ovda Airbase in southern Israel, which had available hardened aircraft shelters. This was the first US deployment of offensive weaponry in Israel. Fox News and The Wall Street Journal had previously reported that the US had been blocked by Gulf allies from using their bases and airspace for strikes on Iran over fears of retaliation.

On 26 February 2026, Fox News reported that the US Fleet Headquarters in Bahrain had been reduced to fewer than 100 mission critical personnel. Satellite photos revealed that all US ships based in Bahrain had left port. Both steps had previously been taken as defensive measures in 2025 ahead of the United States strikes on Iranian nuclear sites.

On 27 February, USS Gerald R. Ford was initially deployed off the coast of Israel. The total number of United States Air Force refueling tankers deployed at Israel's Ben Gurion Airport rose to 14, enabling the Ford's carrier air wings enough range to be able to reach Iran.

==== Incidents ====
On 3 February 2026, the US Central Command said that elements of Iran's Islamic Revolutionary Guard Corps Navy attempted to intercept and board the U.S.-flagged tanker MV Stena Imperative in the Strait of Hormuz. The vessel continued on its course toward the Arabian Sea under the escort of the guided-missile destroyer USS McFaul after U.S. naval forces intervened. During the same day, a U.S. F-35C assigned to USS Abraham Lincoln shot down an Iranian Shahed-139 drone that was flying toward the carrier in the Arabian Sea; U.S. Central Command characterized the drone's approach as a potential threat and stated there were no casualties or damage to U.S assets in the encounter. Iranian state media said that the drone had been completing a surveillance mission in international waters.

On 5 February, Iranian state media reported that the IRGC seized two foreign-flagged oil tankers near Farsi Island in the Persian Gulf, transferring them to the port of Bushehr and alleging the vessels were engaged in fuel smuggling.

According to Defense Express, a Northrop Grumman MQ-4C Triton disappeared over the Strait of Hormuz after sending a 7700 code that signifies an emergency.

=== Iran war ===
On 28 February, the United States and Israel reported that they had conducted military strikes on Iran. Explosions were reported in central Tehran, according to the semiofficial Iranian news station and agency Fars. Israeli Channel 12 News revealed shortly after the strikes began that information about the US F-22 deployment was leaked as part of a joint deception operation to hide that strike preparations were more advanced at other bases. This led to large groups of senior Iranian officials going ahead and gathering together, including Iranian Supreme Leader Ali Khamenei, who were then targeted in opening strikes of the war. Days later it was revealed in a Fox News interview of IDF Spokesperson Brigadier General Effie Defrin that there were months of joint US and Israeli "strategic and operation deception" of satellite imagery leading up to the strike. This encompassed both planes and other facilities. The night of the strike he and IDF Chief of Staff Lieutenant General Eyal Zamir had taken their official cars home from IDF Headquarters. They came back without them so that leading up to the strike satellite imagery would show that their base did not appear full nor warplanes appear armed and ready for a strike.

== Reactions ==
=== Iran ===
Iran's response to the buildup combined military signaling with hardened rhetoric. On 22 January, IRGC commander Gen. Mohammad Pakpour issued a written statement marking the Guards' annual commemoration day, warning the United States and Israel "to avoid any miscalculation" and declaring that the force stood "more ready than ever, finger on the trigger, to execute the orders and measures of the supreme commander-in-chief." Chief of Staff of the Iranian Armed Forces Abdolrahim Mousavi separately announced that Iran had revised its military doctrine from defensive to offensive following the Twelve-Day War.

On 16 February, the IRGC began live-fire naval drills in the Strait of Hormuz, announcing a temporary closure of sections of the waterway, a rare move not seen since the 1980s. The following day, Supreme Leader Ali Khamenei warned that US warships deployed to the Gulf "could be sunk to the bottom of the sea," stating that the "strongest army in the world may receive a slap it cannot recover from." Iran's UN ambassador said all US bases and assets in the region would be considered legitimate targets in the event of an attack. Foreign Minister Abbas Araghchi warned Europe it was "fanning the flames" of a potential wider war, and called the European Union's designation of the IRGC as a terrorist organization a "major strategic mistake." Iran's parliament retaliated by designating the armed forces of EU member states as terrorist organizations under domestic law.

On 26 February, it was reported the Islamic Revolutionary Guard Corps Aerospace Force conducted drills simulating missile attacks on Al Dhafra Air Base in the United Arab Emirates. Satellite imagery reported by The New York Times showed Iran accelerating repairs at missile sites while making limited repairs at its nuclear facilities which had been damaged by the United States strikes on Iranian nuclear sites, indicating a focus on missile infrastructure. The Chinese YLC-8B UHF-Band 3D long-range anti-stealth surveillance radar was reportedly deployed in preparation for potential strikes. State media said the deployment of the Khorramshahr-4 ballistic missile into IRGC underground facilities "coincides with the announced shift in the armed forces' doctrine from defensive to offensive and carries a clear message to regional and extra-regional adversaries." Security Commissioner Yahaya Safavi threatened the White House with a missile attack.

=== United States ===
The US administration maintained that military options remained on the table while pursuing parallel diplomacy. White House Press Secretary Karoline Leavitt told reporters that "President Trump's first option is always diplomacy," while adding that he "is willing to use the lethal force of the United States military if necessary."

Politico reported that some senior White House advisers opposed direct US military action, citing a lack of political support for American casualties, and that a large campaign focused on regime change risked depleting munitions stockpiles. The advisers argued it would be preferable for Israel to strike first, calculating that Iranian retaliation against US assets in the region would then provide a clearer political justification for American involvement. White House Press Secretary Karoline Leavitt responded that "the media may continue to speculate on the president's thinking all they want, but only President Trump knows what he may or may not do."

Secretary of State Marco Rubio stated that the United States was prepared to engage in talks with Iran but stressed that any meaningful negotiations would need to address Iran's ballistic missile program, its support for regional militant groups, and other core security concerns, further adding that Iran's refusal to discuss its ballistic missile program as a "big problem" and an "unsustainable threat" to the US homeland. Rubio expressed skepticism about the likelihood of reaching a successful deal, even as Washington signaled readiness to pursue diplomacy.

The United States imposed new sanctions in late January 2026 targeting Iranian political and economic figures, including Interior Minister Eskandar Momeni and businessman Babak Zanjani, in response to the government's crackdown on protests and to encourage compliance with international norms. Secretary of the Treasury Scott Bessent said that senior Iranian leaders were moving tens of millions of dollars out of the country, describing the financial outflows as evidence that the regime was "abandoning ship" amid ongoing protests and economic collapse, and that the Treasury was tracking these transfers into banks and financial institutions abroad.

The U.S. Virtual Embassy in Iran issued security alerts in January and February 2026, urging American citizens to leave the country amid unrest and travel disruptions, and recommending departure via land through open borders to neighboring countries. The U.S. State Department ordered the departure of non-emergency personal and families from Lebanon on 23 February. It told those in Israel "to leave today" if they wanted to on 27 February.

In his 2026 State of the Union Address President Trump stated that the Iranian regime is rebuilding its "sinister" nuclear weapons program.

In May 2026, Congress began considering major changes to integrate the US and Israeli military, and defense industries, as part of the 2027 National Defense Authorization Act.

=== European Union ===
On 29 January, EU foreign ministers unanimously voted to designate the IRGC as a terrorist organization, placing it on the same list as Al-Qaeda, Hamas, and the Islamic State. EU foreign policy chief Kaja Kallas framed the decision as a direct response to the crackdown on protesters, saying "repression cannot go unanswered." France had reportedly been hesitant, but shifted after new data on the scale of the crackdown became available, and Italy formally proposed the designation days before the vote. The designation triggers asset freezes, travel bans, and a prohibition on funding IRGC-affiliated entities. Iran condemned the move as illegal and politically motivated. The German Bundeswehr later warned of increased Iranian related espionage and cyber attacks.

=== Regional countries ===
Crown Prince of Saudi Arabia Mohammed bin Salman told Iranian President Masoud Pezeshkian that the kingdom would not permit the use of its airspace for any strike on Iran. However, in a closed-door briefing with think tank experts and Jewish organization representatives in Washington, Saudi Defense Minister Prince Khalid bin Salman said that if Trump did not follow through on his threats, it would "only embolden the regime." Israel sent military intelligence officials to Washington to share target data and expressed support for strikes on Iranian leadership. Qatar, the UAE, and Turkey all publicly stated they would not permit their territory or airspace to be used for an attack. An Arab Gulf diplomat said regional leaders were in contact with both Tehran and Washington to avert war, warning that conflict could cause a severe spike in oil prices.

=== Other countries ===
Brazil and Singapore issued threat advisory for citizens to avoid travel to Iran.

- NATO shifted air surveillance focus from Russia to Iran.
- GCC: Kuwait, Egypt and Jordan and Iraq called for restraint.
- G7 threatened to sanction Iranian regime over massacre
- EU: Vice president Estonian prime minister Kaja Kallas said they don't want another war. Poland, Finland, Cyprus, Sweden, and Serbia all told their citizens to evacuate Iran immediately.
- South Korea: The South Korean embassy in Tehran issued a level three red alert and ordered Korean nationals to leave Iran.
- Afghanistan: Taliban spokesperson Zabihullah Mujahid stated that Afghanistan would be prepared to cooperate with Iran in the event of a U.S. attack if requested by Tehran, adding that Iran had prevailed in its recent conflict with Israel and could do so again in a confrontation with Washington.
- China: China condemned U.S. threats and called for a diplomatic resolution. Chinese Foreign Minister Wang Yi warned at the 62nd Munich Security Conference that any war involving Iran would have consequences across the entire region, stressing that escalating tensions could destabilize the broader Middle East.
- France: French Foreign Minister Jean-Noël Barrot urged Tehran to accept negotiations and make concessions to avert war.
- India: India reduced purchases of Iranian oil amid sanctions pressure and enforcement actions targeting Tehran's "shadow fleet", with Indian authorities in February 2026 seizing multiple vessels linked to illicit Iranian oil shipments as part of broader efforts to curb sanctioned energy trade and align with international sanctions enforcement initiatives. Many of these vessels have been sanctioned by the United States. India also remained alert on the potential for a week-long conflict, should such a situation arise.
  - The International Fleet Review 2026, which was hosted in the Indian city of Visakapatnam had the Iranian frigate IRINS Dena and the American destroyer USS Pinckney participating in it, though Pinckney withdrew from the events prior to commencement of the exercise. Dena would be sunk near Sri lanka while returning from the exercise.
- Israel: Israel supported U.S. pressure on Iran but remained wary of Tehran's intentions, with Prime Minister Benjamin Netanyahu urging skepticism about Iran during renewed nuclear talks and emphasizing that Iran should not be trusted to uphold agreements. He stated that Israel was "operating side by side with our major ally, the United States" and that "if the ayatollahs make a mistake and attack us, they will face a response they can't even imagine." It was later reported Israel assessed the U.S. had reached a high level of readiness for a strike, that Iran was stalling in negotiations, and the gaps between the U.S. and Iran were unlikely to be closed.
- Pakistan: Pakistan said it opposes any external interference in Iran and urged all parties to exercise restraint and emphasized the need for dialogue to avoid a wider regional conflict.
- Qatar: Qatar engaged in regional diplomacy to de-escalate tensions and prevent wider conflict.
- Russia: Russia urged a diplomatic solution and offered to store and process Iran's enriched uranium.
- Saudi Arabia: Although Saudi Arabia's official policy is calling for a peaceful, diplomatic resolution, Saudi defense minister Khalid bin Salman said Trump "should take military action" against Iran or risk "strengthening the regime." However, government policy was to not allow use of its airspace or bases for attacks.
- Turkey: Turkey opposed American military action and offered to mediate negotiations.
- Ukraine: Ukrainian President Volodymyr Zelenskyy called for regime change in Iran, stating he would support action against Iran's regime, not against the people.
- United Arab Emirates: The UAE stated it will not allow military operations from its territory or airspace.
- United Kingdom: Prime Minister Keir Starmer denied Trump the use of the British air bases of RAF Fairford in England and Diego Garcia in the Chagos Islands during any attack on Iran, saying it could violate international law.

=== Non-state groups ===
- Al-Qaeda: Al‑Qaeda leader Saif al-Adel wrote to the Supreme Leader of Afghanistan, Hibatullah Akhundzada, requesting that the organization's members be allowed to relocate to the country in the event of the Islamic Republic's collapse.
- Hezbollah: Secretary-General of Hezbollah, Naim Qassem, described Iran's Supreme Leader Ali Khamenei as the representative of the Imam Mahdi and said that Hezbollah and tens of millions of his followers share a deep ideological and religious bond with Khamenei's leadership, viewing threats against him as threats against their own community and obligations to respond.
- Houthis: The Houthis movement in Yemen threatened to resume attacks on commercial shipping in the Red Sea. On 11 February, Houthis were reportedly deploying missiles platforms and digging tunnels raising for possible attack on Red Sea shipping lanes.
- Islamic Resistance in Iraq and Popular Mobilization Forces: The PMF and other Shia militias in Iraq have declared readiness to join a potential war in support of the Iranian regime. These groups have been involved in the massacres and crackdown on Iranian protestors.

== Negotiations ==
Diplomatic contacts between the United States and Iran resumed in early February 2026, as both governments sought to avert a military confrontation while maintaining sharply incompatible positions. Oman served as mediator throughout, with Foreign Minister Badr bin Hamad Al-Busaidi conveying messages between the delegations and hosting or attending each session.

The first round of indirect talks took place on 6 February in Muscat, Oman. The US delegation included special envoy Steve Witkoff, Jared Kushner, and CENTCOM commander Admiral Brad Cooper, the first time a senior US military commander had been present at negotiations with Iran. Iran was represented by Foreign Minister Abbas Araghchi. The talks were structured as indirect discussions, with Al-Busaidi relaying positions between rooms. Araghchi described the session as "a good start," while noting that negotiations must take place "without tension and without threats." Vice President JD Vance publicly voiced frustration over the format, telling Megyn Kelly's podcast that negotiating with a country "when you can't even talk to the person who's in charge" was "bizarre" and made diplomacy "very, very difficult," a reference to Khamenei's absence from the table. Rubio said after the round that he was "not sure you can reach a deal with these guys."

A second round was held in Geneva on 17 February. A US official said Iran would return with detailed proposals to address remaining gaps, and characterized the chances of imminent military conflict as low. Araghchi said the two sides had reached a tentative understanding on the broad principles guiding further discussions, though no substantive agreement had been reached. That same day, Khamenei delivered a speech in which he rejected the US demand for zero enrichment, dismissed US conditions as "foolish," and warned that American warships could be sunk.

A third round took place in Geneva on 26 February. The session ran in two formats: indirect, with Al-Busaidi passing messages between the sides, and at some points directly between the US and Iranian negotiators. IAEA Director-General Rafael Grossi also participated. Araghchi said "good progress was achieved" and that the parties had entered "a serious review of the elements of an agreement, both in the nuclear field and on sanctions," with a fourth round expected within about a week. Al-Busaidi described the outcome as "significant progress" and said technical discussions between nuclear experts would take place in Vienna the following week.

The core positions of the two sides remained far apart throughout. The US demanded that Iran completely halt uranium enrichment, surrender its existing stockpile, roll back its long-range missile program, and end support for regional armed groups. Iran maintained that talks must remain limited to nuclear issues and that its right to enrichment was non-negotiable. The US came into the third round demanding that any future deal remain in effect indefinitely and that Iran give up its stockpile of approximately 10,000 kilograms of enriched uranium, while showing some flexibility on enrichment itself if Iran could prove no path to a bomb existed. On the eve of the third round, the Trump administration imposed new sanctions targeting 14 vessels and entities linked to Iran's oil exports, framing the move as part of the ongoing maximum pressure campaign.

=== Pleas against talks ===
On 8 February, it was reported that Iranians inside Iran pleaded with Trump not to negotiate with the Islamic Republic after the massacres in the country. Likewise, an Iranian man from Bushehr, Pouria Hamidi, posted a video appealing to Trump and Western governments to refrain from any deals with the Islamic Republic, before taking his own life. Among Iranians inside Iran as well as across the Iranian diaspora, calls grew for American military strikes on Iran. Similarly, during the 26 February negotiations in Geneva, Iranian demonstrators protested against the Islamic Republic outside the United Nations Office. United States Senator Lindsey Graham warned against any Iran deal, while also stating, "the best and only long term answer is to stand with the Iranian people and demand regime change." After the 8 April ceasefire, rallies continued to be held worldwide against the Islamic Republic, with protesters voicing opposition to any potential deal with the Islamic Republic.

== See also ==
- 2026 Iran explosions
- 2026 Iranian missile strikes on the UAE
- 2026 Iran War
- Iran Prosperity Project
- Iran–United States relations
- Prelude to the 2026 Iran war
- Twelve-Day War
- United Nations Human Rights Council resolution on Iran (January 2026)
- United States military buildup in the Caribbean during Operation Southern Spear
- American expansionism under Donald Trump
