= Prelude to the 2026 Iran war =

Period of heightened diplomatic tensions

Tension between Iran and the United States during negotiations over Iran's nuclear program intensified in January 2026 when Iranian security forces violently suppressed anti-government protesters.

The US began its greatest buildup of military assets in the region since the Iraq War in 2003. The US accused Iran of building up its nuclear and missile programs to threaten the United States and its allies. Iran accused the US of disinformation. Gulf states like Qatar predicted that escalations could severely harm the region. Negotiations regarding the Iranian nuclear program were held in February until the US and Israel commenced military strikes in Iran on 28 February 2026.

== Negotiations ==
On 13 October 2025, US president Donald Trump stated that the United States was ready to make a deal with Iran; Iranian foreign minister Abbas Araghchi said that Iran would consider any proposal that was "fair and balanced".

Major points of contention remained, including US demands that Iran dismantle its nuclear and ballistic missile programs. Prince Khalid bin Salman, brother of Crown Prince Mohammed and Saudi Arabia's defence minister, reportedly warned about the risks of not attacking Iran in a meeting with US officials.

On 6 February 2026, the US and Iran held indirect talks in Muscat, Oman, mediated by Omani foreign minister Badr bin Hamad Al Busaidi. The discussions were described as a "good start", and both sides agreed to continue. Senior US officials expressed skepticism about the prospects, while Iranian hardliners criticized the negotiations. Meanwhile, the Council on American–Islamic Relations accused Trump of manufacturing justifications for war similar to those for the Iraq War while Qatar Tribune asserted that the administration was falsely claiming that WMDs were being built in Iran.

=== Benjamin Netanyahu's presentation to Donald Trump ===
On 10 February, Israeli prime minister Benjamin Netanyahu, "increasingly alarmed" that negotiations would succeed, met with Trump to push for military action. Prime Minister Netanyahu, who had been urging President Trump for months to attack Iran, on February 11 gave an hour long presentation to Trump in the Situation Room making the urgent case for war. Netanyahu explained that victory would be near-certain: Iran’s ballistic missile program could be destroyed in a few weeks; Iran would be too weak to close the Strait of Hormuz or to strike U.S. interests in the Persian Gulf; and street protests against the Iranian government, with the aid of Israeli agents fomenting riots and an intense U.S./Israeli bombing campaign, would restart to usher in the collapse of the Iranian government. Trump said that Netanyahu's hard sell sounded good, and presidential advisors noted that Trump was deeply impressed by Netanyahu's presentation. Netanyahu had pitched a war against Iran to Presidents George W. Bush, Barack Obama, and Joe Biden, claiming that the war would kill the Iranian senior leadership, incite regime change, and eliminate the Iranian military, but each of the previous presidents rejected Netanyahu's suggestion.

On 11 February, the 47th anniversary of the revolution was marked by pro-government rallies and anti-American rhetoric.

=== Negotiations progress ===
A second round of nuclear talks was scheduled in Geneva. Between 15 and 20 February, Iran increased its oil exports to three times the normal rate, and reduced its oil storage.

On 20 February, Trump issued a 10-day deadline. A third round of indirect talks took place on 26 February, while the sides remained far from agreement.

On 25 February, Iranian foreign minister Abbas Araghchi stated that a "historic opportunity" to reach a nuclear agreement with the US was "within reach". Araghchi emphasized on social media that diplomacy must be prioritized, while reiterating Iran's position against developing nuclear weapons and defending its right to peaceful nuclear technology.

Just before strikes began, on 27 February, Omani foreign minister Badr Al-Busaidi said a "breakthrough" had been reached and Iran had agreed both to never stockpile enriched uranium and to full verification by the IAEA; furthermore, Iran had agreed to irreversibly downgrade its current enriched uranium to "the lowest level possible". Al-Busaidi said peace was "within reach". Talks were expected to resume on 2 March.

On 28 February, following unsatisfactory results in the third round of negotiations, US and Israeli strikes began.

US Middle East envoy Steve Witkoff said Iran had begun talks by insisting on its "inalienable right" to enrich uranium, rejecting a US proposal for zero enrichment, and even boasting that its 460 kilograms of 60% enriched uranium could produce 11 nuclear bombs. Diplomats with knowledge of the Iran talks said Witkoff undermined the negotiations by misrepresenting the key exchange, stating that the US negotiators misunderstood the Iranian proposal, including Iran's offer to suspend uranium enrichment for several years and Iran's reasons for not trusting the US offer of nuclear fuel supplies.

== Anti-government protests in Iran ==
Beginning in late December 2025, nationwide anti-government protests erupted in Iran, driven largely by economic decline, and the government's human rights abuses, with 5 million Iranians protesting. The protests, which included calls for regime change, became the largest since the 1979 revolution, including over 100 cities. The government responded with violent repression, including massacres, with the deadliest incidents occurring on 8 and 10 January 2026. Supreme Leader Ali Khamenei personally ordered the killings with the approval of Iran's top state bodies. The violence was carried out mainly by IRGC and Basij forces, who used live ammunition, shotguns, pellet guns, machine guns, and drones. Witnesses reported blood-covered streets, while hospitals and morgues were overwhelmed.

Iran imposed the longest internet blackout on record to restrict reporting on the unrest and the killings, and disrupt communication among demonstrators. US-based Human Rights Activists News Agency (HRANA) estimated the death toll at 7,000. The Iranian government said the death toll was 3,117. According to HRANA, at least 26,541 people were detained. International Centre for Human Rights said the death toll was 43,000. During a news briefing on 27 February 2026, US President Trump stated that the Islamic Republic "killed at least, it looks like, 32,000 protesters," a figure similar to the earlier estimated death toll of approximately 30,000 by two senior officials in the Iranian ministry of health.

The Shah's son Reza Pahlavi, became a symbolic figure for protesters, called for the end of the Islamic Republic and the establishment of a democratic government. He Trump to carry out targeted strikes on Iran's paramilitary forces to weaken its capacity to suppress protests and hasten the government's collapse.

On 13 January 2026, Trump called on Iranians to "take over your institutions," adding that "help is on its way". He told Iranians to remember "the names of the killers and the abusers", warning that those responsible would "pay a very big price".

On 23 January, it was reported that Khamenei had taken shelter in a Tehran bunker, while global protests in support of Iranian demonstrators were planned and airlines canceled flights to the region; UN Human Rights commissioner Volker Türk condemned the killings, forced confessions, and lack of transparency, and called for an end to executions. Trump announced that a US "armada" was heading to the Middle East, including the aircraft carrier USS Abraham Lincoln and several guided-missile destroyers.

== US buildup ==
Following 13 January, the US adopted a more assertive posture toward Iran while continuing to emphasize that it sought to avoid direct conflict. Senior officials issued statements outlining Washington's position. Trump reiterated that the US was prepared to respond to any actions perceived as threatening US personnel or regional stability, while also stating that military force would be used only if necessary.

On 13 February, Trump ordered USS Gerald R. Ford and its supporting warships to the Middle East.

=== Congressional debates ===
The US Congress debated the subject; some claiming that Iran's regional activities and domestic repression required stronger measures, recommending maintaining or expanding sanctions, increasing military readiness, and issuing clear warnings that attacks on US personnel or allies would result in a forceful response. They contended that a firm posture was necessary to counter destabilizing behavior by Iran.

Others advocated for a more restrained strategy, emphasizing the risks of miscalculation and the potential for unintended conflict. These members called for diplomatic engagement, transparency regarding the administration's decision‑making, and adherence to congressional oversight mechanisms related to the use of military force. Some raised concerns about the legal basis for military action, citing the need for updated authorizations and clear objectives. They claimed that sustained diplomatic efforts offered the best path to addressing long‑standing disputes.

No clear consensus emerged.

=== Diplomacy ===
Further US policy discussions after 13 January considered the security of American personnel and facilities across the Middle East. Pentagon officials emphasized that any attack on US forces would prompt a direct response, reflecting a broader effort to deter proxy activity without escalating into open conflict. Analysts noted that these measures were consistent with previous periods of heightened tension, during which the US sought to balance deterrence against miscalculation.

At the diplomatic level, the US intensified consultations with European and regional partners to coordinate messaging and assess potential avenues for de‑escalation. American diplomats engaged with NATO allies, Gulf Cooperation Council members, and other partners to reinforce shared concerns about Iran's internal repression and regional activities. These discussions aimed to maintain a unified international stance while exploring options for renewed dialogue. Despite these efforts, progress remained limited, as longstanding disagreements over sanctions, nuclear policy, and regional security festered.

=== Military buildup ===
On 13 January, senior national security officials met at the White House to review potential military options, including airstrikes, cyber operations, and targeted raids, as part of the administration's response. On 23 January, Trump announced that a US "armada" was heading to the Middle East.

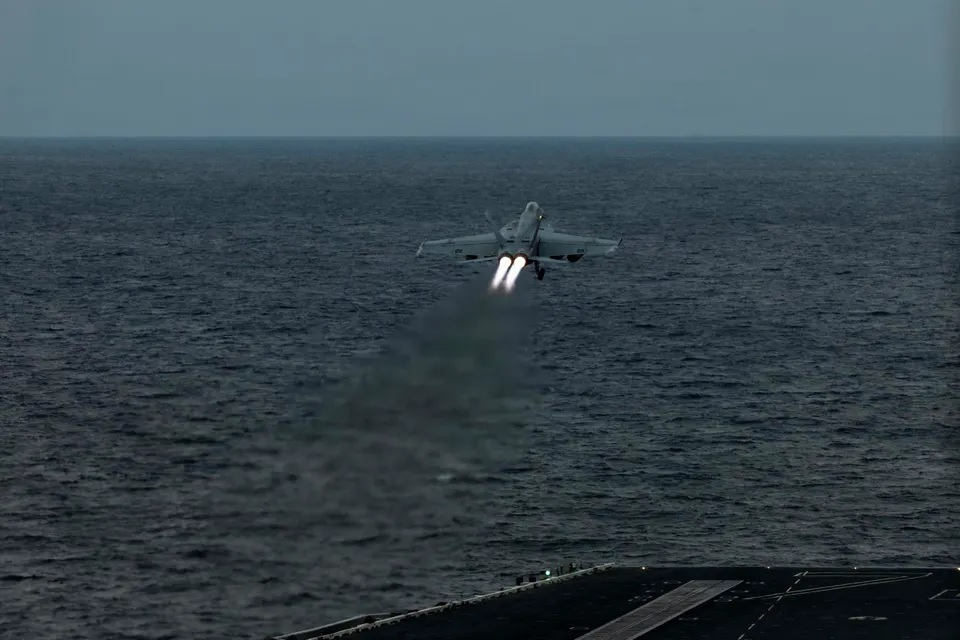
An F/A-18E Super Hornet taking off the Abraham Lincoln in the Arabian Sea on 3 February 2026

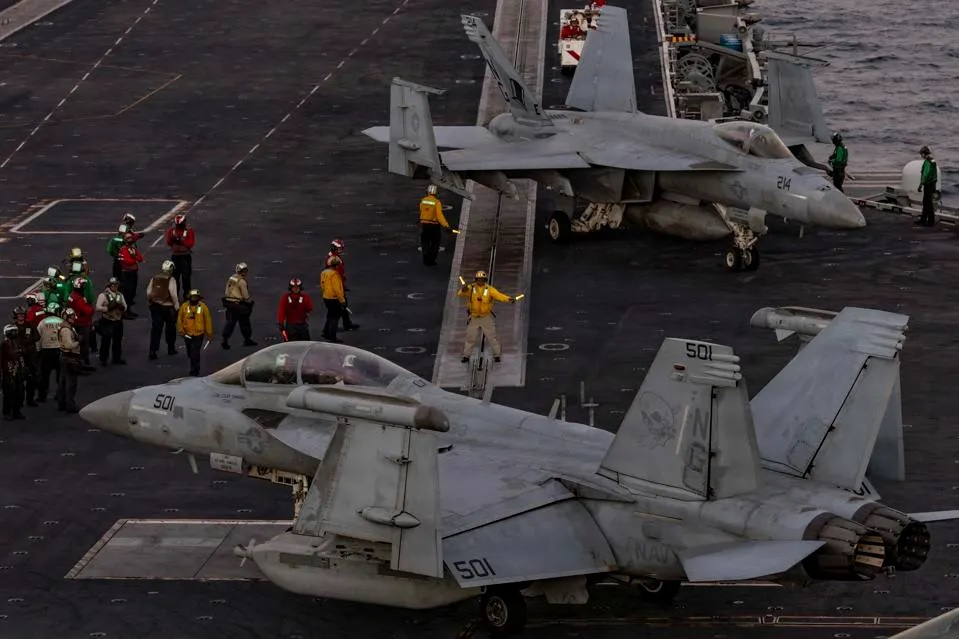
An EA-18G Growler taxiing on the Abraham Lincoln on 3 February 2026

The US military began repositioning assets to strengthen its regional posture. By 25 January, American aircraft carrier strike group, the USS Abraham Lincoln was heading to the Gulf, accompanied by additional Navy and Air Force assets. This movement was described as precautionary and was part of a broader effort to deter Iranian actions.

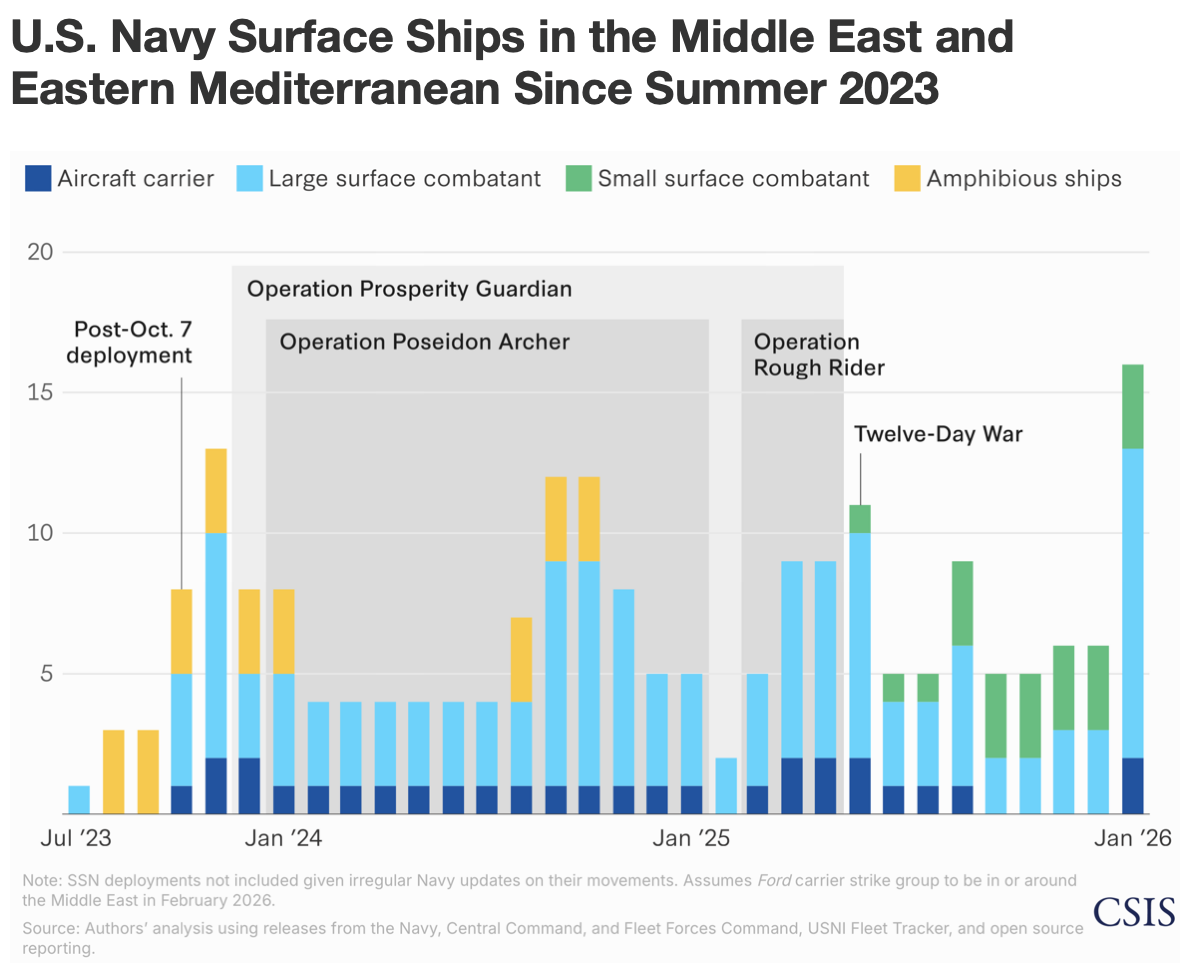
US Navy ships in the Middle East since 2023

Throughout late January, Trump weighed expanded military options. Reports on 29–30 January indicated that he had been presented with plans, including possible commando operations targeting Iranian nuclear facilities. These deliberations paralleled ongoing concerns about Iran's internal unrest, which US officials cited as contributing factors to the heightened military readiness.

On 11 February, Israeli Prime Minister pitched a plan to US President Trump to assassinate Iran's top leaders in the expectation of producing favorable regime change. Despite skepticism from senior cabinet officials, including an intelligence assessment that the plan was "farcical", Trump would approve of the plan on 26 February.

On 14 February, Trump stated he would dispatch the USS Gerald R. Ford, to the Middle East with Carrier Strike Group 12 after completing operations in the Caribbean as part of Operation Southern Spear to support the USS Abraham Lincoln. Arrival of the USS Gerald R. Ford marked a new height in deployment of US Navy assets to the region. US officials told Reuters that the US military was preparing for weeks-long sustained operations against Iran.

Administration national security officials met on 18 February to discuss the situation. Trump was briefed that day by Wirkoff and Kushner about their indirect talks with Iran from the day before.

Also that day, anonymous sources informed CNN that the US military was prepared to strike Iran as early as 21 February, although Trump had yet to make a final decision.

On 19 February 2026, according to reports that the US could launch military strikes on Iran within days, the US warned that Tehran should make a deal. Trump sent warships, tankers and submarines to the Middle East to be ready for potential strikes as early as 21 February.

=== Threatening speeches and posts ===
In the final week of January, Trump issue a series of public warnings directed at Iran, one of the most visible escalations in US messaging during the crisis. On 28 January 2026, Trump declared that "a massive Armada is heading to Iran", describing it as moving "with great power, enthusiasm, and purpose". Trump warned that if Iran did not agree to a deal, "the next attack will be far worse", referencing previous US strikes on Iranian nuclear facilities.

Several of the posts referenced previous US strikes on Iranian nuclear sites which Trump cited as evidence of Washington's willingness to act if necessary. He warned that any further escalation by Iran could prompt a more severe response, presenting the situation as a narrowing window for Tehran to alter its course.

When speaking at Fort Bragg on 13 February, Trump declared that regime change would be "the best thing that could happen".

Trump said on a post on Truth Social, when referring to the Chagos dispute, UK air bases at RAF Fairford and the shared base at Diego Garcia in the British Indian Ocean Territory would be used by the US in an attack on Iran should Iran not agree to a nuclear deal. However, the United Kingdom has reportedly blocked Trump's request to use their air bases, leading to the latter withdrawing his support for the Chagos Islands deal.

While some US sources, including Senator Lindsey Graham, told Axios that the US might need more time to prepare on 18 February, others disagreed. "The boss is getting fed up. Some people around him warn against going to war with Iran, but I think there is 90% chance we see kinetic action in the next few weeks," one anonymous Trump advisor told Axios. US officials stated that Iran has two weeks to submit a detailed proposal.

President Trump said that he is prepared to decide whether to attack Iran within the next 10 days — after deploying a second carrier strike group led by the USS Gerald R. Ford to the Middle East. "We may have to take it a step further, or we may not. Maybe we're going to make a deal. You are going to be finding out over the next, probably, 10 days," Trump said at a meeting of the Board of Peace in Washington.

On 24 February 2026, during a State of the Union speech, Trump accused Iran, which he called "the world's number one sponsor of terror", of reviving efforts to build nuclear weapons. He described Iran's ambitions as "sinister" and warned that Iran had also developed increasingly advanced missile capabilities "that can threaten Europe and our bases overseas, and they're working to build missiles that will soon reach the US of America." US intelligence claims contradict Trump's claims of Iran building such long-range ballistic missiles, with reports suggesting that it would take until 2035 to build such missiles if Iran decided to do so. Claims that Iran was seeking to build long-range ballistic missiles and nuclear weapons were amplified by several Trump administration officials, namely vice president JD Vance, secretary of state Marco Rubio, and special envoy Steve Witkoff.

== Iranian government buildup ==
=== Verbal response ===
Senior Iranian government officials dismissed US warnings as psychological warfare and accused Washington of exploiting Iran's domestic unrest for strategic gain. Government spokespeople reiterated that Iran would not alter its policies under foreign pressure and warned that any military action by the US would be met with what they described as a "decisive" and "regret‑inducing" response. These statements were accompanied by assurances that Iran's armed forces remained fully prepared to counter external threats. Prior to the attack, Khamenei, through his speech addressed to his followers in early February as released by the website of the supreme leader of Iran, warned the US that "if they start a war this time, it will be a regional war".

=== Crackdown ===
Iranian authorities intensified efforts to control the internal situation. Security forces expanded their presence in major cities, and state media portrayed the protests as foreign‑influenced attempts to destabilize the country. Officials framed the unrest as part of a broader campaign orchestrated by hostile governments, arguing that the US and Israel was using the demonstrations to justify increased military pressure.

=== Diplomatic response ===
Diplomatically, Iran maintained that it remained open to dialogue but insisted that any negotiations must respect its sovereignty and security interests. Iranian representatives criticized US sanctions and military deployments as provocative and counterproductive, urging regional states to avoid aligning with what Tehran described as destabilizing American policies. On 31 January, top Iranian security official Ali Larijani said on X that work on a framework for negotiations with the US is progressing.

=== Military and movements ===
Iranian state media reported increased activity among the Islamic Revolutionary Guard Corps (IRGC), including the repositioning of units responsible for air defense, missile operations, and internal security. Analysts noted that these movements were consistent with Iran's standard response during periods of heightened tension, aimed at demonstrating preparedness without provoking direct confrontation.

Iran also conducted limited military exercises in several regions, emphasizing missile capabilities and rapid‑deployment forces. These drills were framed by Iranian officials as routine but were widely interpreted as a message to external actors, particularly the US, that Iran retained the capacity to respond to any attack. Satellite imagery during this period indicated heightened activity at several IRGC bases, including the movement of mobile missile launchers and increased aircraft dispersal at military airfields, measures typically associated with efforts to reduce vulnerability to potential strikes.

Naval forces in the Persian Gulf and Strait of Hormuz also began movements. The IRGC Navy increased patrols and monitored US naval movements closely, while Iranian officials reiterated that the country would defend its territorial waters against any perceived encroachment. Although no direct confrontations were reported, the combination of heightened naval activity, missile readiness, and internal security deployments contributed to a broader atmosphere of military alertness within Iran during the late‑January escalation.

On 3 February 2026, six IRGC Navy gunboats attempted to stop and seize a US tanker in the Strait of Hormuz. The Stena Imperative tanker ignored their demands and continued toward the Arabian Sea under the escort of the USS McFaul (DDG 74). Moreover, a US F-35 fighter jet shot down an Iranian Shahed 139 drone approaching the aircraft carrier USS Abraham Lincoln.

On 5 February, Iran's IRGC Navy announced it had seized two foreign oil tankers near Farsi Island in the Persian Gulf and transferred them to the port of Bushehr, claiming both vessels were involved in fuel smuggling operations.

During the second round of nuclear talks in Geneva on 17 February, Khamenei threatened the US warships in the area, stating Iran is "capable of sinking...[them]." In addition the Strait of Hormuz was closed for several hours during a live military fire drill. Khamenei said that even though the US military may be the strongest in the world, "the strongest army in the world can sometimes be slapped so hard it cannot get up."

Reuters reported on 24 February that the Iran military officials were finalizing the negotiation to acquire CM-302 anti-ship missiles from China, which would pose the greatest threats to the US naval force deployed in the area.

=== Proxies responses and other allied responses ===
Abu Hussein al‑Hamidawi, the leader of Kata'ib Hezbollah, an Iraqi group part of the Popular Mobilization Forces, reaffirmed its support for Iran, warning of a "total war" if Iran is attacked by the US

The leader of Hezbollah made a statement saying that they will choose whether or not to intervene, and is "concerned" about confronting the US. He said that he is "not neutral".

The Taliban-led Afghanistan called on both sides to peacefully resolve their differences, adding that that they would support Iran if the US attacks it.

== Kurdish buildup ==
On 5 January 2026, several Iranian Kurdish parties issued a joint statement calling for a general strike to be held on 8 January in Kurdish areas during the 2025–2026 Iranian protests. Strikes were observed in more than 50 cities and towns, including in Kermanshah province, Kurdistan province, and West Azerbaijan province. In the Kurdish-majority areas of Abdanan and Malekshahi in Ilam province, described as among the centres of the protests, towns were reported to have "fallen into the hands of the protesters" after Iranian security forces abandoned their positions. This was seen as a major success for the Kurdish parties, demonstrating their influence and ability to mobilize people quickly and effectively, something not seen since the Mahsa Amini protests.

== See also ==
- Reactions to the 2025–2026 Iranian protests
- Operation Southern Spear
- 2025 United States strikes on Iranian nuclear sites
- 2026 United States intervention in Venezuela
- Greenland crisis
- 2026 Cuban crisis
- 2026 Iran war
- Prelude to the Iraq War
- Prelude to the 2022 Russian invasion of Ukraine
