= Mass graves in Iran =

Contemporary mass graves in Iran were mostly created during the 1988 executions of Iranian political prisoners. Many of these mass grave sites have been under close surveillance by Iranian state security agents and have also been subject to deliberate politically-motivated destruction. Likewise in January 2026, amid the 2025–2026 Iranian protests and the ensuing 2026 Iran massacres, The Guardian reported that the Islamic Republic was concealing protest deaths through mass graves and burials.

== History ==
=== 1988 ===
In 1988 during the 1988 executions of Iranian political prisoners, thousands of political prisoners were secretly executed in Iran and the bodies secretly buried in mass graves. Based on information provided to Amnesty International, family members, the media, and others, there have been estimates suggesting the existence of more than 120 mass grave sites. Many of the sites have been periodically destroyed by the authorities. Families of the victims have been repeatedly targeted and harassed by state security and intelligence services for holding memorial gatherings at these sites.

=== 2026 ===
On 27 January 2026, amid the 2025–2026 Iranian protests and the ensuing 2026 Iran massacres, The Guardian reported that the Islamic Republic was concealing protest deaths through mass graves and burials.

== Confirmed or credibly suspected mass grave sites ==
=== Khavaran ===
Khavaran is believed to be the largest mass grave so far identified in Iran. In 1988, family members began visiting the site individually or in groups, and in time this led to the creation of an informal community organization called Mothers of Khavaran. The group consists of mothers and other family members of the victims, and despite repeated pressure and harassment by state authorities, they have worked for over thirty years to seek justice and accountability for their loved ones.

== See also ==
- Abduction of bodies by the Islamic Republic of Iran
- Political repression in the Islamic Republic of Iran
