= Killing of Shayan Asadollahi =

2025 death of Iranian protester

Shayan Asadollahi
- شایان اسدالهی
- Born: June 27, 1997
- Died: January 1, 2026 (aged 28); Azna County, Lorestan province
- Cause of death: Killed by Islamic Republic of Iran in the 2025–2026 Iranian protests

Shayan Asadollahi (c. June 27, 1997 – January 1, 2026) was an Iranian protester who was shot dead by security forces during a protest in Iran.

== Background ==
Starting on 28 December 2025, widespread protests erupted across Iran amid a deepening economic crisis and growing public frustration with government corruption, and demands for the end of the regime. The protests were Initially triggered by soaring inflation, skyrocketing food prices, and the Iranian rial's sharp depreciation, but quickly expanded into a broader movement demanding political change and the end of the Islamic Republic, with slogans like "Death to the Dictator", referring to supreme leader Ali Khamenei, and "Long live the Shah", referring to Reza Pahlavi. The demonstrations began in Tehran's Grand Bazaar, and spread to universities and major cities including Isfahan, Shiraz, and Mashhad, drawing students and merchants alike, many of whom cited government corruption, mismanagement, and prioritization of foreign conflicts over domestic needs as major grievances. The economic crisis, worsened by the 2025 conflict with Israel, reimposed UN sanctions, chronic inflation (42.2% in December), and food and health price surges of 50–72%, left merchants struggling to trade and households struggling to survive. Calls for reform grew alongside outrage over energy shortages, water crises, and civil rights abuses, and by early January 2026, dozens of protesters had been arrested, with reports of security forces firing live ammunition directly at demonstrators.

== Personal life ==
Shayan Asadollahi was a barber, aged 28 at the time of his death, from Azna County, Lorestan province. He was of Lur ethnicity, according to Hengaw.

== Killing ==
Asadollahi was killed on 1 January 2026 by direct gunfire from security forces (including IRGC pickup trucks) while returning from a protest. He was shot in the abdomen with live ammunition. He was one of three protesters killed in Azna that evening, alongside a 15-year-old teenager (Mostafa) and Vahab Musavi/Ghaedi.

== See also ==
- 2025–2026 Iranian protests
- 2026 Iran massacres
