= Abduction of bodies by the Islamic Republic of Iran =

The Islamic Republic of Iran has been accused of stealing the bodies of slain protesters from hospitals and morgues in order to prevent families from holding funerals, which could prove to be rallying points for protests. The United Nations has expressed concern about Iran's treatment of detained protesters and said in October 2022 that the authorities were refusing to release some of the bodies of those killed.

The theft of bodies has occurred throughout the regime's history, but has been seen more often in the wake of protests.

== Description ==
The practice is seen as a way of denying dignity and respect to the victims and their families, as well as a way of concealing crimes against humanity. The practice also violates international human rights law and Islamic law, both of which require proper burial and respect for the dead. The practice also deprives the families of their right to truth, justice and reparation for their losses.

By taking away the bodies of the slain protesters, the authorities are trying to prevent their families from holding funerals and mourning ceremonies, which could fuel more protests and public outrage. They are also trying to conceal the evidence of their crackdown and the true number of casualties.

== History ==
The practice of stealing bodies is not new in Iran, as it has been used by the authorities in various protests or conflicts, such as the 2019 Bloody November protests or the 1988 mass executions of political prisoners.

The Bloody November protests in 2019 in Iran were a series of nationwide demonstrations that erupted after the government announced a sudden increase in fuel prices, which caused hundreds of casualties due to hard crackdowns, the authorities have interacted with the families of the victims in various ways, such as withholding their bodies or directing them to bury them in unmarked graves. Human Rights Watch has reported several cases of families who signed statements that they would not communicate with the media or hold public funerals for their loved ones in exchange for the bodies.

During the 2021 protests, Iranian authorities were accused of stealing the bodies of protesters who were killed by security forces during the demonstrations. The protests erupted over various issues such as water shortages, power cuts, economic hardship and political repression. The authorities have also harassed and intimidated the families of the victims, and in some cases, refused to hand over their bodies or forced them to bury them in unmarked graves. The families have been denied the opportunity to say goodbye to their loved ones and to hold funerals and mourning ceremonies, which could fuel more protests and public outrage. Human rights groups and activists have called for justice and accountability for the victims of the repression.

The authorities have also been accused of hiding or manipulating the death certificates of the Mahsa Amini protestors, making it difficult for their families to obtain them or to verify the cause of death. According to Iran Human Rights, a Norway-based NGO, some families have been asked to pay large sums of money to receive the bodies or the death certificates of their loved ones. Some families have also been told that their relatives died of natural causes or accidents, rather than gunshot wounds or torture. Some families have not been able to find their relatives' bodies at all, despite searching in various hospitals and morgues.

Likewise during the 2025–2026 Iranian protests and the ensuing 2026 Iran massacres, reports indicated that families were unable to locate the remains of their relatives after authorities secretly buried them in locations far from where the deaths occurred. Reports stated that security forces and Revolutionary Guard members also raided and intimidated the families of protesters who were killed, imposed restrictions on the retrieval and burial of bodies, and warned that families would be charged fees. Reports have also indicated that the authorities retained the remains until families consented to official accounts describing the deceased as aligned with the government and Basij rather than as protesters. Furthermore, doctors and healthcare workers were reported to have been arrested or disappeared for providing medical care to protesters or documenting their injuries. On 27 January, The Guardian reported that the Islamic Republic was concealing protest deaths through mass graves and burials.

== Refusal to return the bodies of executed individuals ==
On November 29, 2010, Shirin Alam-Houli was tried and sentenced to death on charges of having ties with the PJAK group, after spending one year and 9 months in Evin Prison in Tehran. On May 9, 2010, without her family's or lawyer's knowledge, she was executed along with Ali Heydarian, Farhad Vakili, Farzad Kamangar, and Mehdi Islami in Evin Prison. Despite their efforts, their families have been unable to recover their bodies.

On September 8, 2018, Ramin Hossein Panahi was executed on charges of "membership in a terrorist group, armed conflict, and participation in a terrorist act." According to his brother Amjad Hossein Panahi, the execution was carried out while he was on a hunger strike. He also announced on his Twitter account that his brother’s body was not handed over to the family and had been buried in an undisclosed location.

On the second anniversary of the executions of Ramin, Zaniar, and Lukman, Amnesty International condemned the Iranian government's cover-up regarding the burial places of executed political prisoners, including Ramin Hossein Panahi, Zaniar Moradi, and Lukman Moradi.

== Abduction of bodies of political opponents ==
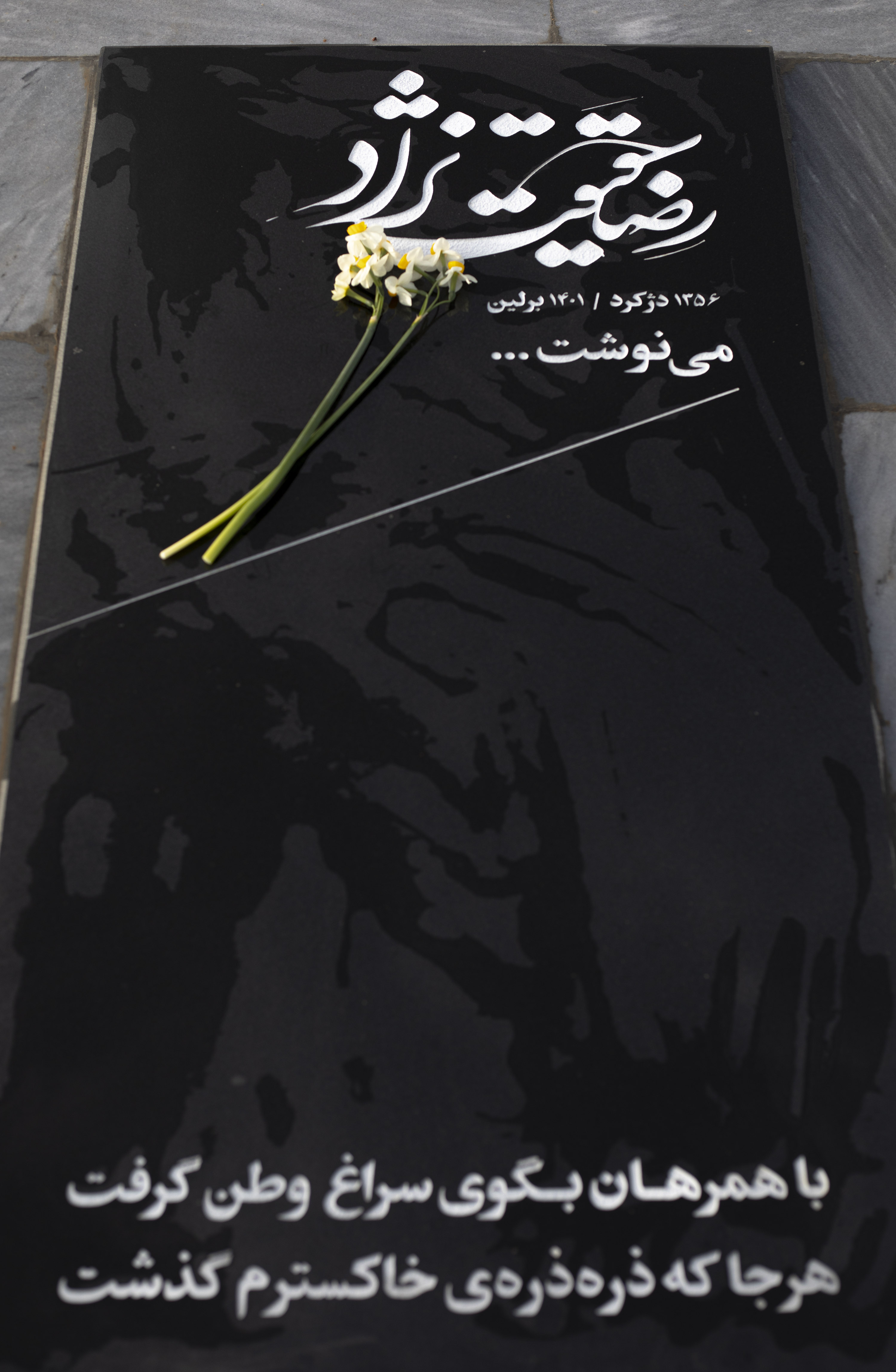
Reza Haghighatnejad's tombstone

The Iranian government has also kidnapped the bodies of its political opponents who died abroad for other reasons. This may be done for revenge against the individual, to pressure their family, or due to fear of public gatherings at the burial. Reza Haghighatnejad, an Iranian journalist, was a political analyst and expert who collaborated with Persian-language media both inside and outside of Iran. He died on October 17, 2022 at the Charité Hospital in Berlin, Germany. His body was then sent to Iran for burial in his hometown. However, on November 26, 2022, Haghighatnejad's body was kidnapped at Shiraz Airport by the Islamic Revolutionary Guard Corps.

Security forces pressured his family to immediately transfer his body out of Shiraz and bury it in another cemetery by 4 p.m. His body was taken despite the fact that an official permit had been issued by the Iranian embassy in Berlin to bury him in his hometown, Dezhkord in Fars Province.

After several days of unsuccessful attempts by the family to reclaim his body from the security forces, on November 6, 2022, they were informed that the Revolutionary Guard had deprived them of their final farewell with their son and buried his body in an undisclosed location far from his hometown.

== Aftermath ==
An independent inquiry, called the Iran Atrocities Tribunal, opened in London in November 2021 to investigate allegations of mass killings of protesters by the Iranian government in November 2019. The tribunal will hear evidence from witnesses, experts and victims’ families, who claim that the Iranian authorities used excessive force to suppress the protests, which erupted over a fuel price hike and turned into a broader expression of dissent. The tribunal will also examine allegations that the Iranian authorities stole the bodies of some of the protesters who were killed, in order to conceal the extent of the violence and prevent their families from holding funerals and mourning ceremonies.

== See also ==
- Killing of Kian Pirfalak
- Mahshahr massacre
- Political repression in the Islamic Republic of Iran
