= United Nations Human Rights Council resolution on Iran (January 2026) =

2026 United Nations resolution on human rights in Iran

The United Nations Human Rights Council (UNHRC) on 23 January 2026 condemned the killing of thousands of people in Iran during a resolution that was adopted with 25 votes in favour, 7 against, and 13 abstentions. Following the adoption, the mandate of the United Nations fact-finding mission on Iran was extended for two years, and the mandate of the Special Rapporteur on human rights in Iran was extended for one year.

== Report of the Special Rapporteur on human rights in Iran ==
The United Nations Special Rapporteur on Human Rights in Iran, Mai Sato, stated that the dangerous rhetoric used by Iranian authorities labeling peaceful protesters as "terrorists", "rioters", or "mercenaries" serves to justify brutal crackdowns and ignores the domestic nature and interconnectedness of the uprising.

She further noted that both the Supreme Leader of Iran and the heads of the three branches of government had called for harsh measures. She emphasized that the use of lethal force must only be a last resort to protect life and must be lawful, necessary, and proportionate. Sato stated that she had received numerous videos showing that the use of lethal force against unarmed protesters violated these principles. The excessive use of force and the issuance of death sentences against peaceful protesters, she said, demonstrate a blatant disregard for the rights to freedom of assembly, freedom of expression, and the right to life. She added that even if a death sentence is not carried out, merely sentencing protesters to death is unlawful and designed to silence dissent.

On 22 January 2026 (2 Bahman 1404), Sato stated that the death toll from the January 2026 Iranian protests could exceed 36,500 people.

== Internet shutdown ==
The resolution condemned the prolonged and nationwide internet shutdown imposed in Iran since 8 January 2026 as a violation of international human rights law. The Human Rights Council called for the immediate, full, and unrestricted restoration of internet access across Iran, emphasizing that the measure was intended to prevent documentation of human rights violations and to restrict citizens' access to information.

== Defense by Iran's ambassador to the United Nations ==
Ali Bahreini, the permanent representative of Iran to the United Nations in Geneva, stated that when the protests began, Iran fully recognized the people's right to peaceful assembly and considered dialogue with protesters. He claimed that on 8 and 9 January 2026, the protests entered a second phase characterized by organized violence, including destruction of public property and armed actions against civilians and law enforcement forces. According to what he described as verified statistics, 3,117 people were killed during the unrest, of whom 2,127 died as a result of what he termed terrorist operations. He asserted that these figures were not fabricated, but the result of nationwide investigations supported by legal documentation.

== See also ==
- 2026 Iran massacres
- 2025–2026 Iranian protests
- Human rights in Iran
