= 2026 Rasht massacre =

Part of 2026 Iran massacres

- Part of 2025–2026 Iranian protests, 2026 Iran massacres
- Location: Rasht, Iran
- Date: 8 January 2026 – 9 January 2026
- Attack type: Massacre, mass shooting, Arson
- Deaths: 392–3,000+
- Perpetrator: Security forces of the Islamic Republic

On 8 and 9 January 2026, security forces of the Islamic Republic carried out a massacre in the historic bazaar of Rasht, Iran, with the aim of suppressing the anti-government protests which began in December 2025. According to reports by human rights sources, they then went into the hospitals to shoot the injured protesters. There were also allegations that security forces targeted injured protesters during the crackdown, including reports that wounded individuals were shot at close range.

== Background ==
The protests of December 2025 in Iran began on 7 December 2025, following widespread dissatisfaction with the Islamic Republic's government and the intensification of the economic crisis in Iran. Initially, these protests were sparked by discontent over inflation, rising food prices, and the sharp devaluation of the Iranian rial, but they quickly transformed into a widespread movement calling for the end of the current regime.

These protests, which initially began with the participation of traders and market vendors in Tehran, soon spread to universities and involved large numbers of students from across the country. Protesters expressed their dissatisfaction with the government through anti-government slogans, as well as slogans supporting the monarchy, clearly voicing their political demands for broader reforms. This movement quickly became the largest wave of unrest in Iran since the 2022–2023 protests following the killing of Mahsa Amini.

The protests, which initially centred around traders in the Grand Bazaar of Tehran, quickly spread to major cities such as Isfahan, Shiraz, Mashhad, Qom, Bandar Abbas, Ferdows, and Bojnord. In response to these developments, the Islamic Republic used violent repression tactics.

A News Reporter in the IRIB Baran Channel (Guilan's Official TV Station) later reported that "We are currently in what seems like a war scene. As you can see, Fire can be seen from the background as if a place was bombed."

== Evidence ==
Analyses of the massacre included that of The Washington Post, which based its analysis on 40 photos and videos and statements by six witnesses and residents.

== Massacre ==
On 8 and 9 January 2026, as the nationwide anti-government protests reached their peak, the city of Rasht became the site of one of the most violent security crackdowns. From the late hours of 8 January, security forces deployed extensively in the central areas of the city, particularly around Rasht Bazaar, Sabezeh Meydan, and the municipal area, to disperse the protest gatherings. According to reports and eyewitness accounts documented in Iran International and Iran Human Rights, in addition to firing tear gas, rubber bullets, and live ammunition, government forces set parts of the market and surrounding areas on fire in some locations, which caused the fire to spread and thick smoke to rise, creating suffocating conditions for the protesters. Conversely, also in Iran International, the fire began by being set by protestors at the Hajj Mojtahid Mosque and was "aimed at freeing detainees". According to an account by Rasht City Council spokesman Mahyar Samakchi published in Mashregh News, the fire was started in the mosque by protestors who threatened passersby and firefighters with machetes to complete their task. This account was seemingly illustrated to some extent by a non-timestamped video referencing the 2025-2026 Iran protests posted to social media by an anti-Iranian-government protestor. The Guardian published an eyewitness account which did not specify the party that set the fire, but that "there was a group of plainclothes [firearm-wielding officers with masks] who attacked crowds trying to put out the fire and [...] stopped the firefighters from entering the bazaar." The Washington Post stated "it was not immediately clear [according to two recently mentioned eyewitnesses] how the fire began or spread", but that "[t]he city was swept up in strong, hot winds that night, according to two [other] witnesses, suggesting the fire spread rapidly."

It is reported that several citizens were trapped in the closed spaces of the bazaar and, while escape routes were either blocked or limited, they were targeted by direct gunfire. Furthermore, they were deprived of the ability to transfer the wounded freely to medical centers. Protesters who tried to flee from the scene of the fire were shot by security forces. Forces also blocked fire trucks from responding to the fire. According to the HRANA, at least 392 people were killed in Rasht, the vast majority of them since the beginning of the 2026 Internet blackout in Iran on 8 January. Iran International reported that some witnesses suggested the death toll may have been as high as 3,000 over the two day-period.

As a part of the massacre, not only did the Rasht baazar get damaged, but many different locations took damage. A Ganbo (Janbo) Market was collapsed in the inside on 8 January, in Lakan Boulevard. It was later renovated in Early March. There is no official record of casualties and fatalities from the Ganbo Market Incident. On the other side of Ganbo Market, A Flower Shop and a Home Masjid was burned down completely. Later on, a sign was put up from the burned buildings in Persian: "This building was attacked by American-Israeli Terrorists" with the Iranian flag in the background. The Flower shop and the Masjid were both taken down and later turned into a Paygah e-Moghavemat (Station of Holdings Back). Again, there is no official record of Casualties and Fatalities of this incident.

The crackdown intensified, global internet access in Rasht and several other parts of the country was widely cut off. According to an eyewitness, around 5 pm on 8 January the internet was disconnected in Rasht, and about 30 to 40 minutes later, phone communications were also cut off, making both phone calls and text messages impossible. This action severely disrupted citizens' connections to the outside world and minimized their ability to share real-time images and information about the events. By the end of these two days, multiple reports emerged of protesters being killed and injured, as well as widespread arrests of citizens. This series of events turned Rasht into one of the most prominent symbols of the deadly repression of the December 2025 protests.
