= Death sentence of Erfan Soltani =

Death sentence issued by the government of Iran

Erfan Soltani (Persian: عرفان سلطانی; born 1999) is a 26-year-old Iranian demonstrator detained during the 2025–2026 nationwide anti-government protests. Throughout January 2026, he was widely reported by Western media and certain opposition groups to have been sentenced to death or executed.

Soltani was arrested on 8 January 2026 and opposition groups claimed he was charged with "waging war against God" (Persian: محاربه, romanized: moharebeh), a capital offense under Iranian law. Soltani's execution was expected to be carried out via hanging on 14 January 2026. Human rights organizations reported Soltani was denied a lawyer and was not given a trial before his sentence. Iranian judiciary refuted the allegations, stating Soltani was charged with "colluding against national security" and "propaganda activities against the establishment," offenses which are not punishable by the death penalty in Iran. On 15 January 2026, British newspaper The Guardian reported that Erfan Soltani's execution "had been postponed", citing a member of his family abroad as a source. Western media and human rights organisations have cited Soltani as an example of the Iranian authorities' handling of detainees during the January 2026 nationwide protests.

On 15 January, the Iranian judiciary dismissed foreign media reports of Soltani's impending execution as a "fabrication". The Iranian judiciary stated that Soltani was accused of "conspiring against national security" and engaging in "propaganda against the regime," offenses that do not carry the death penalty, according to the state broadcaster IRIB.

According to the Human Rights Organization Hangaw, Soltani met with his family on 16 January and was in good health. By 2 February, he was reported to have been released on bail.

== Background ==
The protests began on 28 December 2025 in Tehran amid economic hardship and quickly spread to all 31 provinces in Iran with anti-government slogans and calls for regime change.

The government reacted with violent crackdowns and thousands of arrests, using live ammunition against protesters. The number of civilians killed is unclear due to the internet and phone blackout the government implemented as part of their suppression. Reports indicate that the number of casualties ranges between 2,000 and 20,000 people. Nobel Peace Prize winner Shirin Ebadi referred to the mass killings as a planned "massacre under the cover of a sweeping communications blackout".

The Islamic Republic refers to protesters against the government as moharebeh (a term meaning "war against God"), and their actions are punishable by death. In reaction to the recent anti-government protests, Supreme Leader Ali Khamenei said "rioters must be put in their place". Mohammad Movahedi Azad, Iran's attorney general, warned that protesters are an "enemy of God", a crime punishable by death under Iranian law. Human rights groups say Iran is the world's second-largest user of capital punishment after China, with at least 1,500 hangings recorded last year, according to Iran Human Rights.

== Arrest and detention ==
Erfan Soltani, a 26-year-old resident of Fardis, Karaj, was arrested in his home on 8 January 2026, during ongoing anti-government protests in Iran. Following Soltani's arrest, several reports said he was refused any legal representation and was not given a trial before his sentence was decided. His family reported they only found out about Soltani's arrest days later and would only be allowed to see him for 10 minutes before his execution scheduled for 14 January 2026.

Soltani's hanging would be the first execution related to the recent anti-government protests in Iran. The Australian reported that "His execution is expected to be the first of many".

On 15 January 2026, the family of Erfan Soltani said that prison authorities had contacted them and informed them that his execution was postponed, without offering further details. On 18 January, Soltani was reported by his family to be in good physical health.

On 31 January, he was released on bail of two billion tomans, the equivalent of around $12,600 at exchange rates at that time.

== Reactions ==
The execution sentence was widely reported across international media outlets. United States President Donald Trump warned Iran over Soltani's execution with "very strong action". Iran Human Rights reports that protesters are being killed on a mass scale during the crackdowns and warns that the number of executions may increase. The organization urges the international community to take immediate action. Amnesty International called on international organizations to demand that Iran's authorities stop the executions, including Soltani's case.

Entities including Hengaw and Iran Human Rights described his case as emblematic of the authorities' use of expedited procedures and severe punishments to deter dissent during the protests.
