= Reza Shah, bless your soul =

Political slogan in honor of Shah of Iran (1925 to 1941)

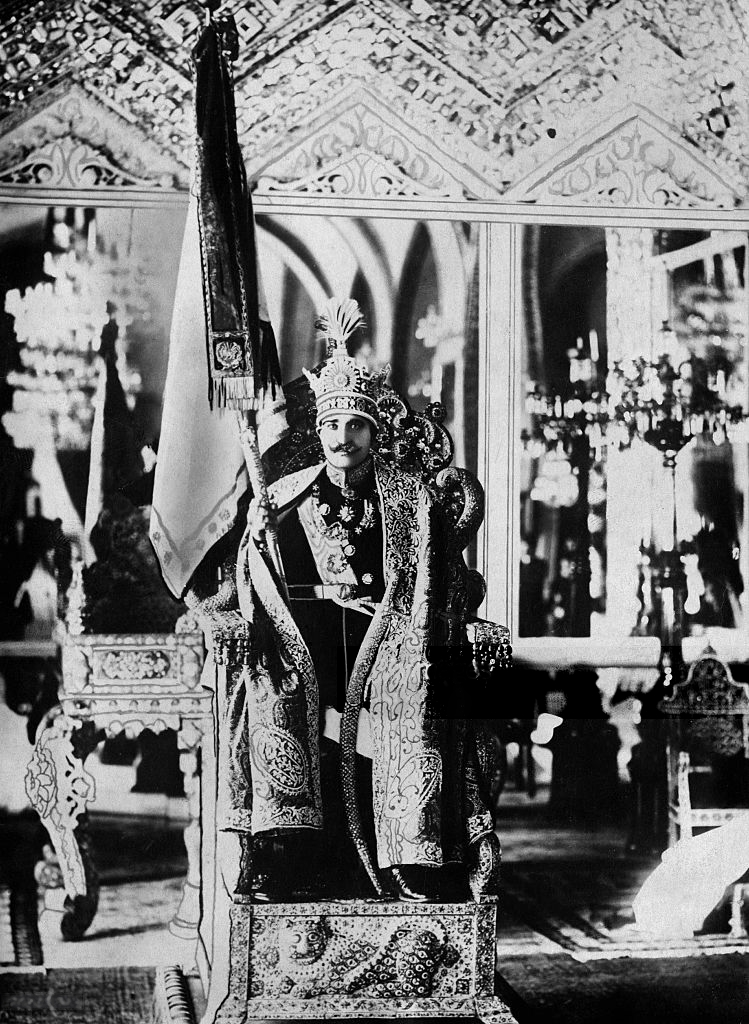
Coronation photograph of Reza Shah, taken in 1926 during his coronation

"Reza Shah, bless your soul" (Persian: رضاشاه روحت شاد, romanized: Reza Shah Ruhet Shâd, lit. 'Reza Shah, may your soul be blessed') is a phrase used in honour of the former Shah of Iran and founder of the Pahlavi dynasty, Reza Shah, and is commonly used as a slogan against the Islamic Republic.

This slogan made a comeback almost 40 years after the end of Pahlavi Iran, and first emerged in 2017 in Iran during the 2017–2018 Iranian protests. In addition to honoring the late monarch and his rule, this slogan is also used to express opposition to the current government of Iran led by the Islamic Republic since the Iranian Revolution and the end of monarchism in Iran.

== History ==
This slogan began in January 2017 during protests near the Goharshad Mosque in Mashhad. This phrase soon spread to other cities across the country, including the Shiite clerical capital of Qom. On 27 April 2018 during a football match in the Azadi Stadium in Tehran, spectators shouted the phrase and led to widespread attention. This happened again on 30 September during a match in Shiraz. In July 2018, protesters outside the Islamic Consultative Assembly shouted this phrase in protest of the Iranian economic crisis, leading to a stir across Iranian society. During the 2018 Tehran protests, protesters in the Grand Bazaar, Tehran also used this phrase alongside "Neither Gaza nor Lebanon, My Life for Iran".

During the August 2018 Iran protests, this phrase became a major protest slogan. on 30 July 2018, protesters in Isfahan used this phrase alongside several others, including "Death to the Dictator" and "Leave Syria alone, think of us first". On 26 April 2019, audience during a football match in Tehran again shouted the phrase.

During the 2019–2020 Iranian protests, protesters again used this phrase to protest the high energy prices in the country. Several other slogans were also used, including "The clerics must disappear" and "Our enemy is here, they are lying that it is America".

In summer 2021, this slogan again appeared during the 2021–2022 Iranian protests, including protesters from Izeh. Then on 26 July, the anniversary of Reza Shah's death, a power outage occurred in Aladdin Mall in Tehran. This led to protests among shoppers who used this phrase, along with travellers in the Tehran metro who also used this slogan.

On 24 November 2021, protests erupted in Shahr-e Kord over water mismanagement, with protesters also using this phrase. Later during the 2021 Isfahan protests, this phrase was also used among protesters in the city.

During the 2022 Iranian food protests, some protesters used this phrase to also oppose clericalism in Iran. During the June 2022 Iran protests, protesters also used this phrase in several cities, including Abadan and Khorramshahr.

On 30 May 2022, during a football match in Tehran between Esteghlal and Masjed Soleyman, the spectators again shouted this slogan.

On 8 June, during a protest among retirees outside Worker House, participants also shouted this phrase. On 12 June, social security pensioners protested in Shiraz and Isfahan used this phrase alongside several others, such as "1357 riots led to national poverty" and "Clerics must disappear". The next day, protesters in Dorud again used this phrase, and called for president Ebrahim Raisi to step down. Then on 14 June, protesters in Kazerun used this phrase during protests.

On 31 December 2025, protesters in Fasa shouted this phrase along with "Death to the Dictator" outside the city government's office.

=== Outside Iran ===
On 10 February 2019, the 40th anniversary of the Iranian Revolution, British Iranians organized a demonstration outside the Iranian embassy in London. The protesters used this phrase alongside others, including "Death to Khamenei" and "Death to Velâyat-e Faqih".

On the same day, similar demonstrations were held in Stockholm, using phrases including "Reza Shah, bless your soul", "Long live Pahlavi", "Death to the Islamic Republic" and "Islamic Republic of Iran must disappear".

== Related slogans ==
During the 2017–2018 Iranian protests, there were many slogans nostalgic of Pahlavi Iran or in support of monarchism in Iran. These include "Shah of Iran, return to Iran", "Shah, bless your soul", "Reza, Reza Pahlavi", "Reza Shah, sorry", "Crown prince where are you, come and save us", and "Iran without a Shah has no hope".

During the 2021–2022 Iranian protests in Khuzestan province, protesters in Izeh shouted "Reza Shah, we are ashamed" to demonstrate remorse for the Iranian Revolution. Similar demonstrations in Isfahan also used "Reza Shah where are you, come and save us" to relay discontent towards Iranian historical figures.

== Reaction ==
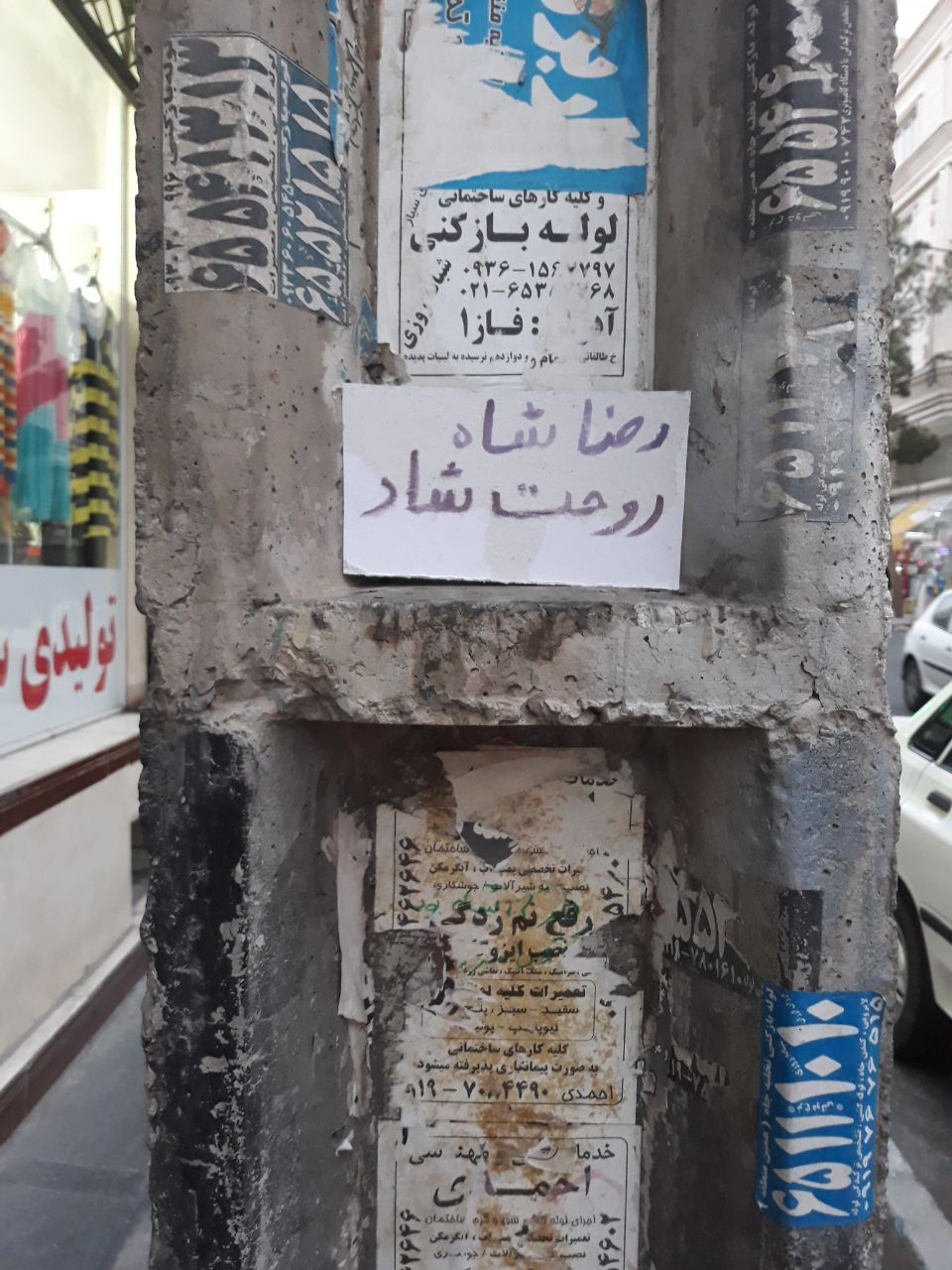
A tract with the slogan written on it.

=== Academic perspective ===
According to sociology Professor Javad Miri from the Institute for Humanities and Cultural Studies, this phrase emerged partly due to the lack of public discourse over past Iranian figures, with the Islamic Republic labelling past figures as "Taghut" (طاغوت) and a need for an "absolute denial of Pahlavi" (انکار مطلق پهلوی). He believes that this phrase has less to do with Reza Shah himself, and more with a rejection of state-affiliated education in Iran about Iranian history.

Political scientist and writer Morteza Mardiha explained this from the psychological perspective, where this slogan is a sign of "deep dissatisfaction" and "hatred for the status quo" rather than genuine enthusiasm for monarchism in Iran. Mardiha also believes that realist slogans like these are less "intrinsic" and more of a "temporary phenomenon", and that it is inappropriate to demonize or idolize political figures such as Reza Shah and Mohammad Mossadegh. Mardiha also believes that the situation among Iranian society during Pahlavi Iran was no worse than during the Islamic Republic, and while not denying the evils of the Pahlavi era, he believes that many problems during this time was due to the "backwardness of the people" rather than of the government itself.

Mardiha summarizes as the following:

It's one thing to recognize problems during an era, and quite another to assess where we would be now if we had continued as we were. The idea behind monarchist slogans lies in the latter.

— Morteza Mardiha

In his analysis of this slogan, philosophy researcher Amir Yahya Ayatollahi states that Reza Shah should be assessed within the context of his reign and not within the context of today's values, and that the European continent and later the entire world was caught up in state fascism during Reza Shah's reign in Iran. He concludes that, contrary to the propaganda of the Islamic Republic, neither Reza Shah nor his son were anti-religious, and that the tyranny of these two rulers was no greater than that of their predecessors and successors. In Ayatollahi's opinion, whether this slogan is related to Reza Shah and "modernization from above" has to do with the relationship of the classical opposition to the post-revolutionary political structure in Iran, which he says is "ambiguous".

Political science professor Sadegh Zibakalam from the University of Tehran also interpreted this slogan from psychology. He views the slogan as a demonstration of disappointment from the younger generation towards the results of the Iranian Revolution rather than ignorance of historical facts. But he also warned against forgetting the fact that 98% of voters supported the 1979 Iranian Islamic Republic referendum. Zibakalam also wrote Reza Shah, a biography on the monarch's life. He explained the Shah's historical standing as follows:

I believe that history is the best determinant, provided that it is not distorted; in my opinion, Reza Shah did many services to Iran; I believe that Iran is indebted to two people; one is the sword of Agha Mohammad Khan and the other is the boots of Reza Khan; although during Reza Shah's era, a closed and dictatorial atmosphere prevailed, this same Reza Khan was able to maintain the unity of Iran, preserve its territorial integrity, and bring us many developmental services.

— Sadegh Zibakalam

Sociologist and anthropologist Ebrahim Fayyaz, who is ideologically close to the Iranian principlists, believes that the aristocracy emerging from the Islamic Republic similar to the one emerging during the late Qajar era. Fayyaz views this slogan as a reaction to this religious aristocracy on the one hand, and is also a demand for new political and social space to get rid of this aristocracy on the other hand.

According to political commentator Mohammad Rahbar, all the individuals and parties that called for a secular democracy was suppressed, and in this wasteland of Iranian politics, Reza Shah became the sole representative of a secular and development-oriented government.

Political analyst Majid Mohammadi believes that this type of monarchist and nostalgic slogans are mainly not calling for the restoration of monarchism in Iran, but reflects "the people's dissatisfaction with the economic and social direction and dissatisfaction with the country's position in the international community" and "the people’s disappointment in reforming affairs and changing the trend of government inefficiency." According to Mohammadi, part of the Iranian nation views the Pahlavi dynasty as a government that was respected in the international community, and that Pahlavi Iran had much better conditions than countries such as Turkey and South Korea. Mohammadi noted that in 1980, Iran ranked 17th in the world in terms of GDP and Turkey ranked 27th, but in 2014, Turkey ranked 17th based on the same index, while Iran’s rank has dropped to 21st. For South Korea, Iran's per capita income was twice that of South Korea in 1977, while South Korea's per capita income was five times that of Iran in 2012. Mohammadi stated that Iran had far worse conditions during the Islamic Republic than during the Pahlavi era in terms of passport validity, brain drain, and foreign investment.

=== Supporters ===
Supporters of this slogan views Reza Shah as a founder of "modern Iran", including his harsh stance on clericalism in Iran and establishment of national order. Sociologist Mehdi Mozaffardi believes that this is a "strategic" slogan targeting the essence of the Guardianship of the Islamic Jurist, which is the basis of the Islamic Republic. According to Mozaffari, Iranians prefer Reza Shah over his son Mohammad Reza Pahlavi because Reza Shah was more determined in his opposition to the Twelver Shia clergy, and never used the power of the clergy to counteract communism in Iran.

Writer and journalist Alireza Nourizadeh wrote the following about Reza Shah and this slogan:

Just as Khomeini lost his credibility the day after his death, Reza Shah gained credibility. Don't consider this a small matter when you see that Dr. Sadegh Zibakalam, a devoted son of the revolution, who was in the service of the revolution from the very first days and played a prominent role in the university during the Cultural Revolution with all his youth and wrote dozens of articles, research, and speeches about the revolution, leadership, and pure revolutionary Islam of Mohammadi, who is a renowned professor at the Faculty of Law of the University of Tehran, who with admirable courage in a television debate in front of the eyes and ears of millions of viewers, praised Reza Shah for giving him his identity, and says that a large part of everything he has today was achieved through that man's efforts.

— Alireza Nourizadeh, 2 December 2021.

=== Opponents ===
On 4 August 2018, former member of the Islamic Consultative Assembly and editor-in-chief of Asr Iran Bijan Nobaveh-Vatan spoke at a media event, and public opposed this slogan praising Reza Shah. He defended the Islamic Republic, saying that the goal of those who use this phrase is to return to the oppressive era of Pahlavi Iran.

Former lawmaker Masoud Rezaei also criticized this slogan during an interview, describing it as "illogical". He also believed that this slogan reflects the inability for correct historical analysis among the Iranian public, especially in the younger generation.

The Iranian opposition group People's Mojahedin Organization of Iran also opposed the use of this slogan. In a protest outside the Islamic Consultative Assembly in July 2018, some protesters used this slogan. The PMOI later accused the Islamic Republic of encouraging protesters to use it, claiming that those who shout this phrase are actually "Khameneists" aimed at "disrupting people's minds", and who received "escorts" from the police command.

Sociologist Yousef Abazari attributed the use of this slogan in Goharshad Mosque (site of the Goharshad Mosque rebellion) to the "clumsy policies of the Islamic Republic" in the narrative of history. He believed that the "policy of humiliation of the SAVAK" and the "clumsy narrative of the reigns of Reza Shah and Mohammad Reza Pahlavi in the textbooks of the Islamic Republic" had led to the growth of a generation of people who think "like children" and are unable to understand the realities of Pahlavi Iran. He also claimed that those who use this phrase are young people who had no knowledge of the Pahlavi era.

== See also ==
- Javid Shah
