= Casualties of the Iranian Revolution =

Mortality tally for political uprising

Observers differ on how many people died during the 1979 Iranian Revolution. The current Islamic government uses the figure of 60,000 killed; in reference to this figure, the military historian Spencer C. Tucker notes that "Khomeini's regime grossly overstated the revolution's death toll for propaganda purposes". The sociologist Charles Kurzman, drawing on later more detailed records from the Islamic Republic, believes the number was closer to 2,000–3,000.

Tucker explains that the consensus of historians regarding estimated deaths during the Iranian revolution (from January 1978 to February 1979), numbers between 532 and 2,781.

The number of protesters and political prisoners killed after the fall of the Shah by the new Islamic Republic as it consolidated power is estimated by human rights groups to be several thousand. According to Tucker's estimations, in the period of 1980 to 1985, between 25,000 and 40,000 Iranians were arrested, 15,000 were tried, and 8,000 to 9,500 were executed.

== Casualties of the monarchy ==
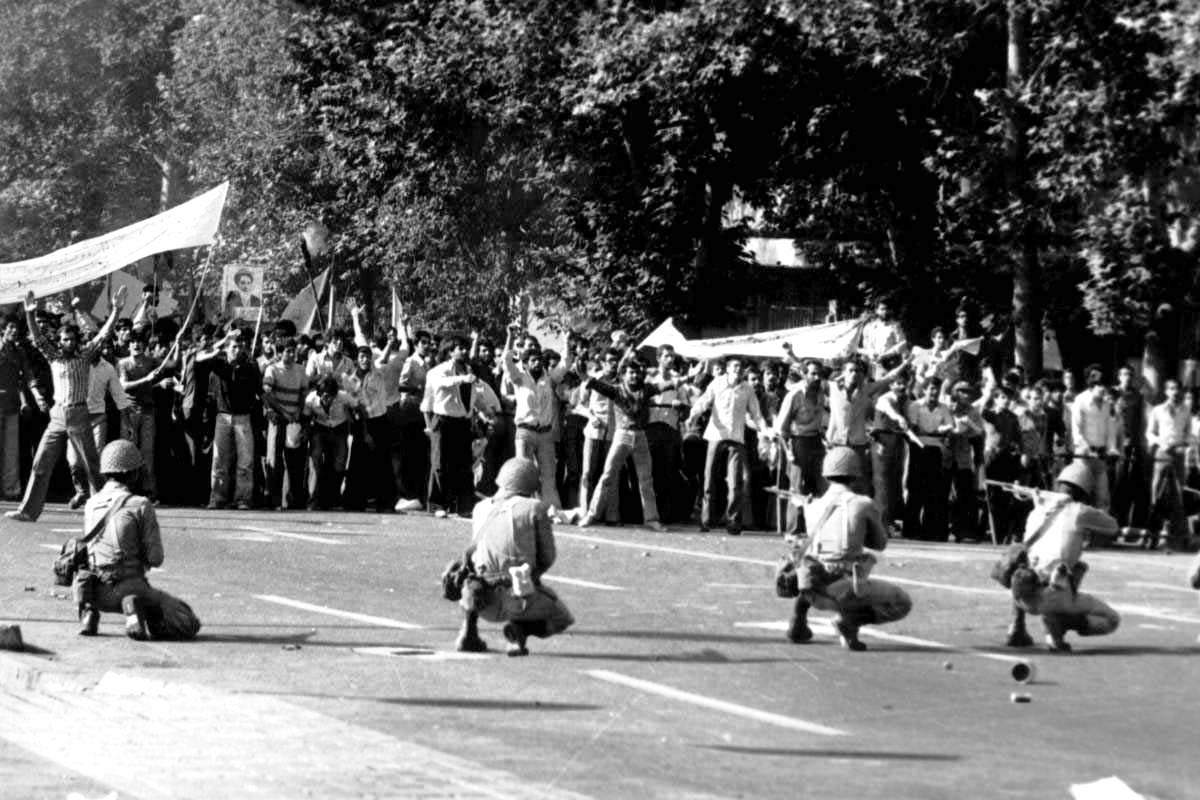
Street clashes between protesters and the Shah's regime in Tehran

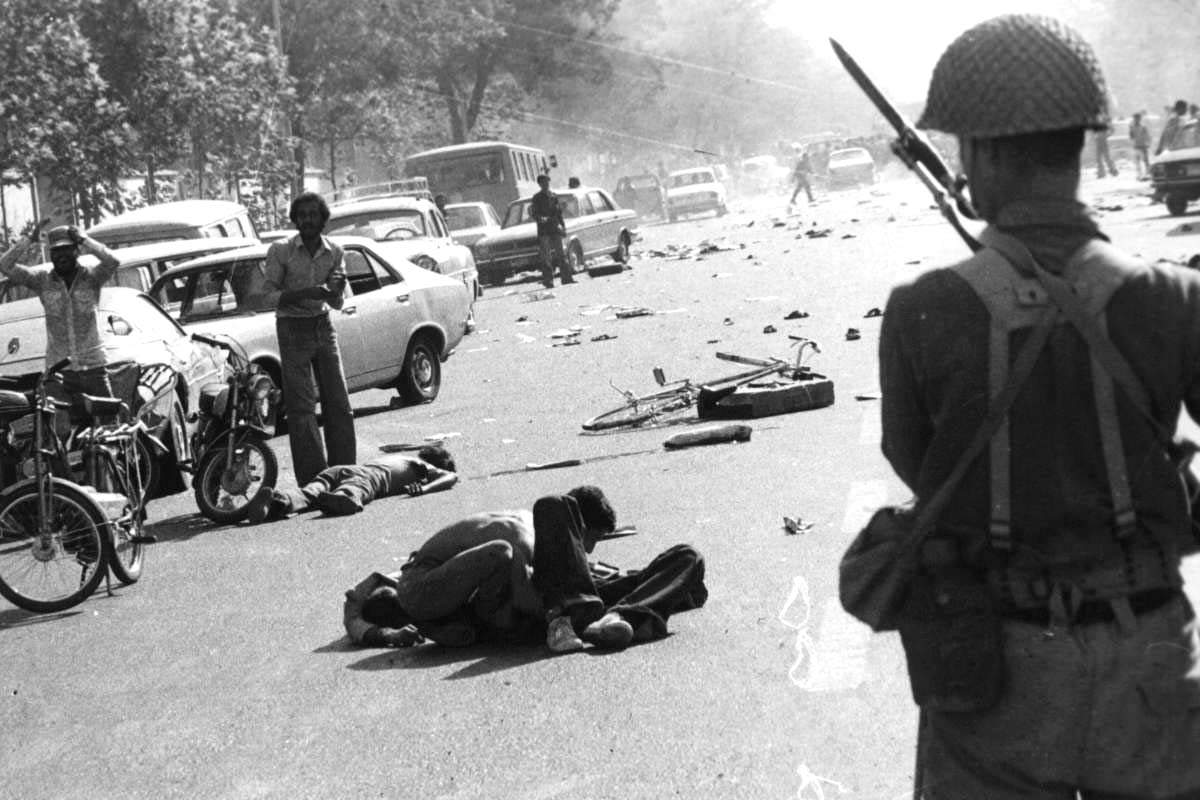
Killed protesters by the Shah's regime in Tehran

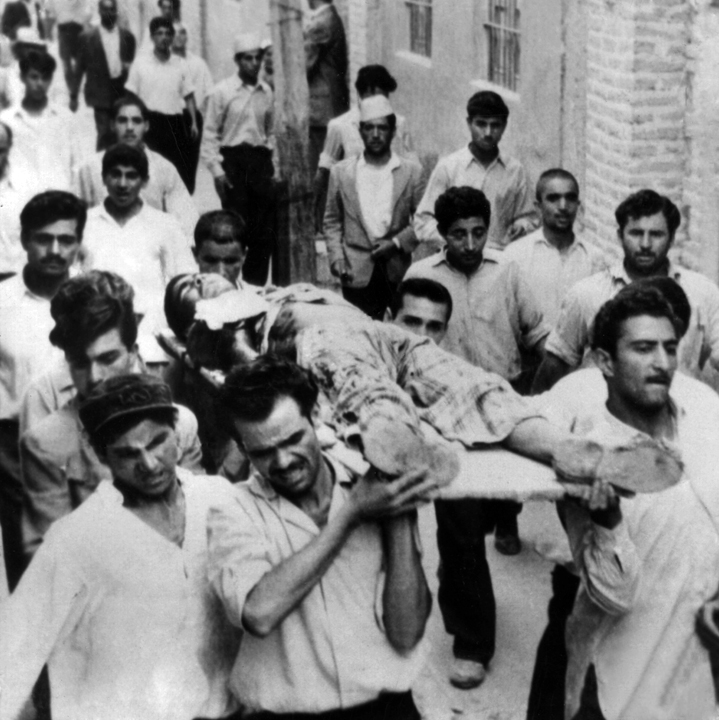
Iranian protesters on 5 June 1963

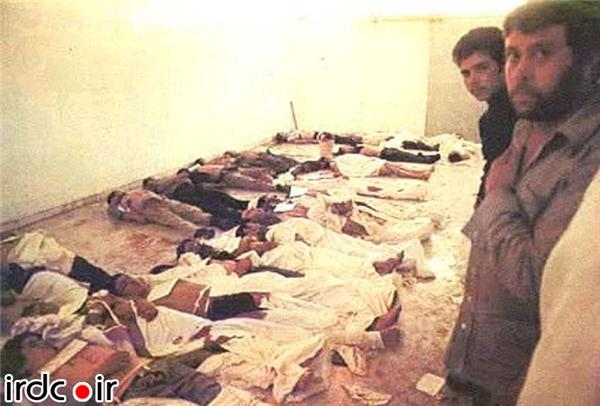
Killed protesters in Black Friday

The Preamble of the 1979 Constitution of the Islamic Republic of Iran speaks of the Islamic revolution being "watered by the blood of more than 60,000 martyrs and 100,000 wounded and disabled". The revolution's leader, Ruhollah Khomeini also stated that "60,000 men, women and children were martyred by the Shah's regime." In reference to the 60,000 figure, the military historian Spencer C. Tucker notes that "Khomeini's regime grossly overstated the revolution's death toll for propaganda purposes". Tucker explains that the consensus of historians regarding estimated deaths during the Iranian revolution (from January 1978 to February 1979), numbers between 532 and 2,781.

Emadeddin Baghi, while a researcher at the Foundation of Martyrs and Veterans Affairs (Bonyad Shahid) — established after the revolution to compensate the survivors of fallen revolutionaries — found a smaller number were killed. Between 1963 and 1979 he estimated 3,164 in the anti-Shah movement were killed. The Foundation of Martyrs identified 744 dead in Tehran (where the majority of the casualties were supposed to have occurred). The coroner's office counted 895 dead; and Tehran's main cemetery, Behesht-e Zahra, 768 dead.

According to Kurzman, "the shah frequently told foreign emissaries that he was unwilling to massacre his subjects in order to save his throne".

=== By date ===
According to one collection of 'martyrs of the revolution,` Laleh'he-ye Enqelab, examined by Charles Kurzman,

- 35 demonstrators died in the first eight months of 1978,
- 33 in Shahrivar (August–September 1978) and
- 18 in Mehr (September–October 1978), when the revolution turned to strikes instead of street protests.

When the military regime was installed in Mehr 1978, the number of deaths jumped to

- 45 in Aban (October–November 1978), then to
- 85 in Azar (November–December 1978),
- 137 in Dey (December 1978–January 1979), and
- 179 in Bahman (January–February 1979).

=== 19 Dey protest in Qom ===
The 9 January 1978 (19 Dey 1356) protest in the holy city of Qom against a libelous story about Ayatollah Khomeini was perhaps the first major protest of the revolution. The official death toll of monarchy was nine. U.S. diplomats first reported to Washington that 20 to 30 died, then fourteen. Rumors spread immediately that one hundred or more were killed, and "opposition estimates ranged up to 300." Public opinion at the time as reflected in "a small survey in Tehran the following week" found that "more people believed the opposition's casualty figures than the government's". In contrast, a list recently produced by the Center for Documents on the Islamic Revolution, a "pro-revolutionary institute", found five people died in the protest.

=== 29 Bahman protest in Tabriz ===
40 days later, on 18 February 1978, (29 Bahman), groups in a number of cities marched to honour the fallen and protest against the rule of the Shah. The state brought in "troops and tanks from nearby bases." This time, violence erupted in the northwestern city of Tabriz. According to the opposition, 500 demonstrators were killed there, according to the government ten were. "A recent [circa 2004] pro-revolutionary review of the event, however, has stated definitively that the total was 13 dead."

=== Cinema Rex fire in Abadan ===
The 19 August 1978 fire at a movie theater in Abadan killed at least 420 people. The event started when four men doused the building with airplane fuel before setting it alight.

Khomeini immediately blamed the Shah and SAVAK for setting the fire, and, due to the pervasive revolutionary atmosphere, the public also blamed the Shah for starting the fire, despite the government's insistence that they were uninvolved. Tens of thousands of people took to the streets shouting "Burn the Shah!" and "The Shah is the guilty one!"

According to Roy Mottahedeh, author of The Mantle of the Prophet, "thousands of Iranians who had felt neutral and had until now thought that the struggle was only between the shah and supporters of religiously conservative mullahs felt that the government might put their own lives on the block to save itself. Suddenly, for hundreds of thousands, the movement was their own business."

After the revolution, many claimed that Islamist militants had started the fire. After the Islamic Republic government executed a police officer for the act, a man claiming to be the lone surviving arsonist claimed he was responsible for starting the fire. After forcing the resignation of the presiding judges in an attempt to hamper the investigation, the new government finally executed Hossein Takb'alizadeh for "setting the fire on the Shah's orders," despite his insistence that he did it on his own accord as an ultimate sacrifice for the revolutionary cause.

=== "Black Friday," 17 Shahrivar ===
The clash between government and protestors that is said to have enraged anti-Shah forces and eliminated "any hope for compromise," occurred on 8 September 1978 (17 Shahrivar) in Tehran. The Shah introduced martial law, and banned all demonstrations, but thousands of protesters gathered in Tehran. Security forces shot and killed demonstrators in what became known as Black Friday.

The clerical leadership declared that "thousands have been massacred by Zionist troops," "Estimate of casualties on ... Black Friday, range from fewer than 100 to many thousands. The post-revolutionary Martyr Foundation could identify only 79 dead, while the coroner's office counted 82 and Tehran's main cemetery, Beheshte-e Zahra, registered only 40."

== Revolutionary casualties ==
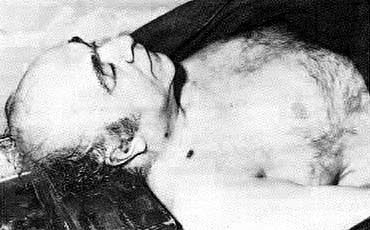
Amir-Abbas Hoveyda

Following the overthrow of the Shah's government on 11 February 1979 (22 Bahman 1357), members of the old regime, including senior generals, were executed by the revolutionary leadership. For this purpose, the Islamic regime formed komitehs (committees) in all provinces. Ayatollah Mohammad Reza Mahdavi Kani was the chief of the Central Provisional Komiteh for the Islamic Revolution.

In the first couple of months, over 200 of the Shah's senior civilian officials were killed as punishment and to eliminate the danger of coup d'état. The first death sentences were for four of the shah's generals and were approved by the Tehran court in February 1979. They were Mehdi Rahimi, the military commander of Tehran, Reza Naji, the military governor of Isfahan, Nematollah Nassiri, the head of SAVAK, and Manouchehr Khosrodad, an air force general. All four generals were executed by firing squad on the roof of the then Ayatollah Khomeini's headquarters on 15 February.

On 7 April 1979, Amir-Abbas Hoveyda, former prime minister of Iran, was executed. Two days later, on 9 April, ten senior officials of the Shah, including two generals and a cabinet member, were executed in Tehran. Those killed included commander-in-chief of the air force, Amir Hossein Rabi'i. On 11 April, former foreign minister, Abbas Ali Khalatbari, former agriculture minister Mansour Rouhani and former mayor of Tehran, Gholam-Reza Nikpey and seven other senior figures were killed. On 8 May, a total of 21 former Iranian officials, including three former high-level politicians, were executed. They were Javad Saeed, former Majlis speaker, Gholam Reza Kianpor, former information minister, and Mohammad Reza Ameli Tehrani, former education minister. On 9 May, eight men, including the prominent Jewish executive Habib Elghanian, and former information minister, Abdul Hassan Saadatmand, were executed, raising the number of the executed people 119 since February 1979.

On 23 July 1979, five more men were executed in the Khuzestan province. The death toll became 363 with these executions since February 1979. In August 1979, the courts began to try the members of the ethnic minorities in the country who participated in demonstrations against the new Islamic government, and the trials resulted in massive death sentences. By November 1979, the death toll was 550 and by January 1980, the number had reached at least 582.

Critics complained that the brief trials lacked defense attorneys, juries, transparency or opportunity for the accused to defend themselves, were held by revolutionary judges such as Sadegh Khalkhali, the "hanging judge". Those who escaped Iran were not immune. A decade later, another former Prime Minister, Shapour Bakhtiar, was assassinated in Paris, one of at least 63 Iranians abroad killed or wounded since the Shah was overthrown, although these attacks are thought to have stopped after the early 1990s.

The pace of executions then accelerated, leading to at least 906 executions between January 1980 and June 1981. After president Abolhassan Banisadr was impeached on 20 June 1981 (30 Khordad 1360), a concerted effort was made to find and prosecute the erstwhile supporters turned opposition, primarily leftists. Bloodletting became much worse. According to Shaul Bakhash,

The number who lost their lives will probably never be known with certainty. Amnesty International documented 2,946 executions in the 12 months following Bani-Sadr's impeachment. A list compiled the following year by the Mojahedin-e Khalq cited 7,746 persons who had lost their lives through executions, in street battles, or under torture in the short period from June 1981 to September 1983.

According to historian Ervand Abrahamian, revolutionary courts executed more than 8000 opponents between June 1981 and June 1985. These were mainly members of the Mojahedin-e Khalq, but also included

Fedayins and Kurds as well as Tudeh, National Front, and Shariatmadari supporters. ... Thus the toll taken among those who had participated in the revolution was far greater than that of royalists. This revolution – like others – had devoured its own children.

Military historian Spencer C. Tucker wrote that from 1980 to 1985, between 25,000 and 40,000 Iranians were arrested, 15,000 were tried and 8,000 to 9,500 were executed, although some estimates have been far higher.

In 2025 the Iranian government created a parking lot by paving over a section of Behesht-e Zahra cemetery in Tehran that had held the remains of an estimated 5,000 to 7,000 victims of the mass executions that followed the 1979 revolution. The year before, United Nations Special Rapporteur Javaid Rehman described the regime's pattern of destroying graveyards as an attempt to “conceal or erase data that could serve as potential evidence to avoid legal accountability.”

== See also ==
- Human rights in the Islamic Republic of Iran
- Human rights in Pahlavi Iran
- Slogans of the Iranian revolution
- Political slogans of the Islamic Republic of Iran

== Bibliography ==
- Kurzman, Charles, The Unthinkable Revolution in Iran, (Harvard University Press, 2004)
- Keddie, Nikki, Modern Iran : Roots and Results of Revolution by Nikki Keddie, Yale University Press, 2003
- Mackey, Sandra The Iranians : Persia, Islam and the Soul of a Nation, New York : Dutton, c1996.
- Taheri, Amir, The Spirit of Allah: Khomeini and the Islamic Revolution, Adler and Adler, c1985
