= Omid Sarlak =

Iranian activist found dead after protest (1997/1998–2025)

- امید سرلک
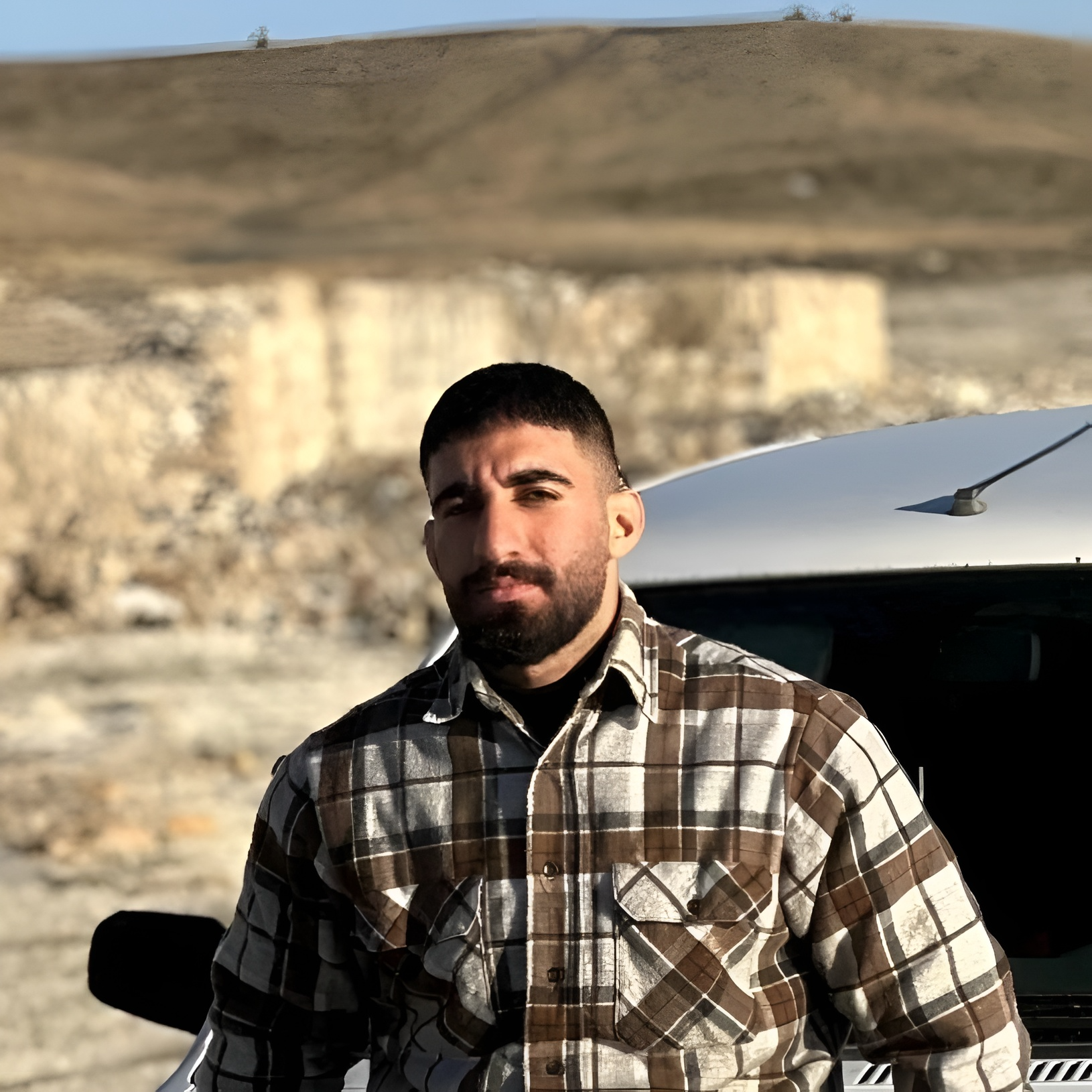
- Born: 1997 or 1998; Iran
- Died: 1 November 2025 (aged 27); Aligudarz, Lorestan Province, Iran
- Cause of death: Gunshot wound
- Body discovered: Underpass bridge, Aligudarz
- Resting place: Akbarali Cemetery, Aligudarz
- Known for: Opposition activism against the Islamic Republic of Iran

Omid Sarlak (امید سرلک, 1997 or 1998 – 1 November 2025) was an Iranian activist whose death in November 2025 became a focal point for domestic dissent and international attention. He died shortly after he made a public social-media post burning a poster of Ali Khamenei, the Supreme Leader of Iran, prompting public dissent over his alleged murder by the state security services.

== Upbringing ==
Sarlak was from the city of Aligudarz in Lorestan Province, western Iran. He was born in 1997 or 1998 (age 27–28) or 2002 or 2003 (age 22–23) at the time of his death.

== Video and death ==
In the days leading up to his death, Sarlak posted a video on his Instagram story showing himself burning a portrait of Khamenei, while overlaying the footage with archival audio of the former Shah Mohammad Reza Pahlavi. Alongside the video he used hashtags such as "Death to Khamenei" and issued a call for youth to rise up: "How long humiliation, how long poverty, how long being ridden over? This is the moment to show yourself, young man."

On 1 November 2025, his body was found inside his car near a sports stadium in Aligudarz, with a gunshot wound. Local authorities declared the death a suicide, citing a handgun found beside his body. The family and many activists dispute the official version, alleging that he was in fact killed; at his funeral large crowds chanted anti-regime slogans such as "Death to Khamenei" and asserted "they killed him." Following the funeral, Iranians posted images and videos of demonstrators burning pictures of Ali Khamenei alongside those of Ayatollah Ruhollah Khomeini, who founded the Islamic Republic.

== Reactions ==
Iranian state‑affiliated media denied that Sarlak was killed by security forces, stating that he died by suicide. The state‑aligned outlet Nour News accused "anti‑revolutionary" groups of provoking unrest and linked the incident to heightened tensions following the Twelve-Day War between Iran and Israel.

At the site where his son’s body was found, Sarlak's father was filmed saying, "They killed my champion," and alleging that his son had been "surrounded" in an underground passage and killed. The man who filmed the video claimed that the killers left a gun beside Sarlak's body to stage a suicide.

Gohar Eshghi, mother of Sattar Beheshti, stated on Instagram that Sarlak "stood bravely against oppression and they took his life for opposing a tyrant ruler".

Several days after Sarlak's body was found, Ahmad Khatami, a member of Iran’s Assembly of Experts, stated in a speech in Tehran: "Any threat against the supreme leader is waging war on God, which carries a death sentence."

Following Sarlak's death, videos circulated on social media of Iranians burning images of Ayatollah Ali Khamenei and Ruhollah Khomeini.

In a strongly worded statement, the U.S. Department of State condemned Sarlak's death and blamed the Iranian government, asserting that the "suspicious timing and circumstances surrounding Sarlak's death strongly suggest regime involvement," and describing the case as another example of "the Iranian regime's brutal repression of dissent."

== Funeral ==
Sarlak was buried at Akbarali Cemetery in Aligudarz. Videos from the funeral showed mourners chanting anti‑government slogans including "Death to Khamenei".

== See also ==
- Death of Mahsa Amini
- Political repression in the Islamic Republic of Iran
