= Javid Shah =

Political phrase for the Iranian Monarchy

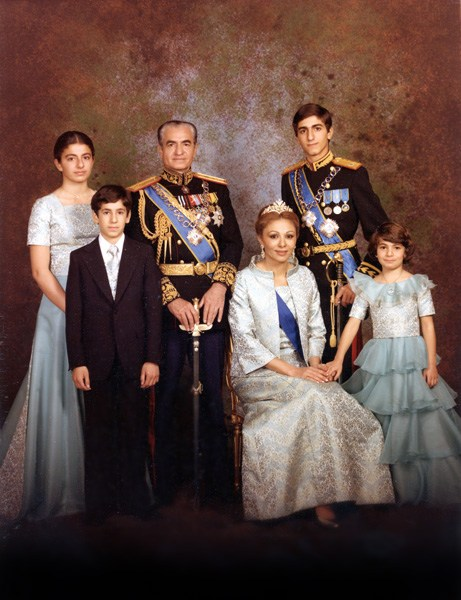
Official portrait of the Pahlavi dynasty in 1978

Javid Shah (Persian: جاوید شاه, lit. 'Long live the Shah' or 'Long live the king') is a phrase in support of the monarchs of Iran. Since the 1979 Islamic Revolution, the phrase has also become a political slogan used by many in the Iranian opposition to demonstrate opposition to the Islamic Republic by advocating for either the full restoration of the Pahlavi dynasty or solely the return of Reza Pahlavi to lead the planned transitional government.

== History ==
=== Early use ===
During the Pahlavi era, the phrase "Javid Shah" was commonly used in official ceremonies and in public spaces. At the time, usage of the phrase was more a "psychological and social adaptation to the established order" rather than a sign of conscious political action.

After the Iranian Revolution in 1979, the new revolutionary government banned all symbols of the Iranian monarchy, including the phrase "Javid Shah": violations risked arrest, torture, or even death. Owing to this, the phrase has become an act of opposition towards the government. A notable usage was from Mehdi Rahimi, who was a lieutenant general during the Pahlavi dynasty and was set to be executed by the Iranian government. Before being shot, he shouted "Javid Shah" in salute to express his loyalty to the Iranian monarchy. Since then, the phrase has become a form of "resistance and political protest".

=== Rise in popularity ===
During the 2019–2020 Iranian protests, there were increasing calls from certain protesters for the restoration of the Pahlavi dynasty. The slogan became more prominent during the Mahsa Amini protests among the Iranian opposition. Thereafter, during the 2025–2026 Iranian protests, this slogan resurged in popularity along with several other pro-Pahlavi slogans, such as "This is the final battle, Pahlavi will return" and "Reza Shah, bless your soul". There were several instances of the phrase being displayed in public places, including one in Isfahan and another in Qom.
