= Long Live the King =

Long Live the King may refer to:

- "The king is dead, long live the king!", a traditional proclamation

== Music ==
- Long Live the King (album), by Narnia, 1999
- Long Live the King (EP), by The Decemberists, 2011
- "Long Live the King", a song by Sabaton from Carolus Rex
- "Long Live the King", a song by Twilight Force from the 2019 album Dawn of the Dragonstar

== Other uses ==
- Long Live the King (1923 film), an American silent film starring Jackie Coogan
- Long Live the King (2019 film), a South Korean film directed by Kang Yoon-sung
- "Long Live the King" (Hercules: The Legendary Journeys), a television episode
- Long Live the King (Ninjago), an episode of Ninjago
- Long Live the King!, a 1917 novel by Mary Roberts Rinehart
- Long Live the King (adventure), an adventure for the play-by-mail role-playing game Silverdawn
- The Long-Lived King, a graphic novel taking place in the universe of The Owl House

== See also ==
- Long Live The Kings, an album by Kottonmouth Kings
- Long Live the Queen (disambiguation)
