= Neither Gaza nor Lebanon, My Life for Iran =

Slogan

Flag/banner with the slogan in Nastaliq script

"Neither Gaza nor Lebanon, My Life for Iran" (Persian: نه غزه، نه لبنان، جانم فدای ایران, romanized: Na Ghazze, na Lobnan, jânam fadâ-ye Irân) is a political slogan from Iranians criticizing the Islamic Republic's military, financial and political support for Palestinian militant groups in their conflict with Israel. The phrase has been adopted as a rallying cry by various movements that oppose the Islamic Republic, including the Iranian Green Movement, the Bloody November protests, the Mahsa Amini demonstrations, and the 2025–2026 protests. These movements have used the slogan to express their discontent with the regime and demand political and social reforms.

== Reactions ==
=== Domestic ===
Sadegh Zibakalam voiced support for the slogan, As a Muslim Iranian, I don't know why I should declare my innocence from the slogan "Neither Gaza nor Lebanon". I think that for me, Iran still comes first, Iran comes second and is important, Iran comes third and Iran comes last. Just as for the Palestinians, Palestine comes first, Palestine comes second and Palestine comes third. It is the same for Lebanon. No! For me, Sadegh Zibakalam, the slogan "Neither Gaza nor Lebanon, I will sacrifice my life for Iran" is right, and for me, Iran comes first and the interests and benefits of the Islamic Republic of Iran come first.

Supreme Leader Ali Khamenei opposed the slogan, saying that it deceived people who not only did not sacrifice their lives for Iran, but also did not even give up their comfort and interests for the country. Other officials that voiced opposition included Ahmad Khatami, Ali Akbar Velayati, Taqi Yazdi, Hossein Saffar Harandi, Mohammad Baqer Qalibaf, Hadi Khamenei, Mohammad Atrianfar, and Mohsin Qara'ati. Seyyed Abolhasan Navvab called this slogan a deviant slogan and the beginning of a movement to separate Shiism from the Islamic world.

=== International ===
Some international analysts have said that the slogan reflects the perception among many Iranians that the government is spending the country's financial and human resources on supporting groups such as Hamas in Gaza and Hezbollah in Lebanon, while domestic economic problems persist. This has been reflected in media coverage and analytical reports on the Iranian protests by media outlets such as the BBC.

International analyses have suggested that this slogan is not meant to be an antagonism towards the Palestinian or Lebanese people, but rather as a statement against the government's extensive spending on regional affairs, which analysts say has led to economic and livelihood problems in Iran. This slogan also reflects a combination of economic demands and concerns about Iran's foreign policy, and could be interpreted as one of the elements that distinguishes the recent protests from purely economic ones.

== See also ==
- Political slogans against the Islamic Republic of Iran
  - Death to the Dictator
  - Death to Khamenei
  - Javid Shah
- Political slogans of the Islamic Republic of Iran
  - Death to America
  - Death to Israel
