= Iranian economic crisis =

Economic downturn in Iran from 2024 onwards

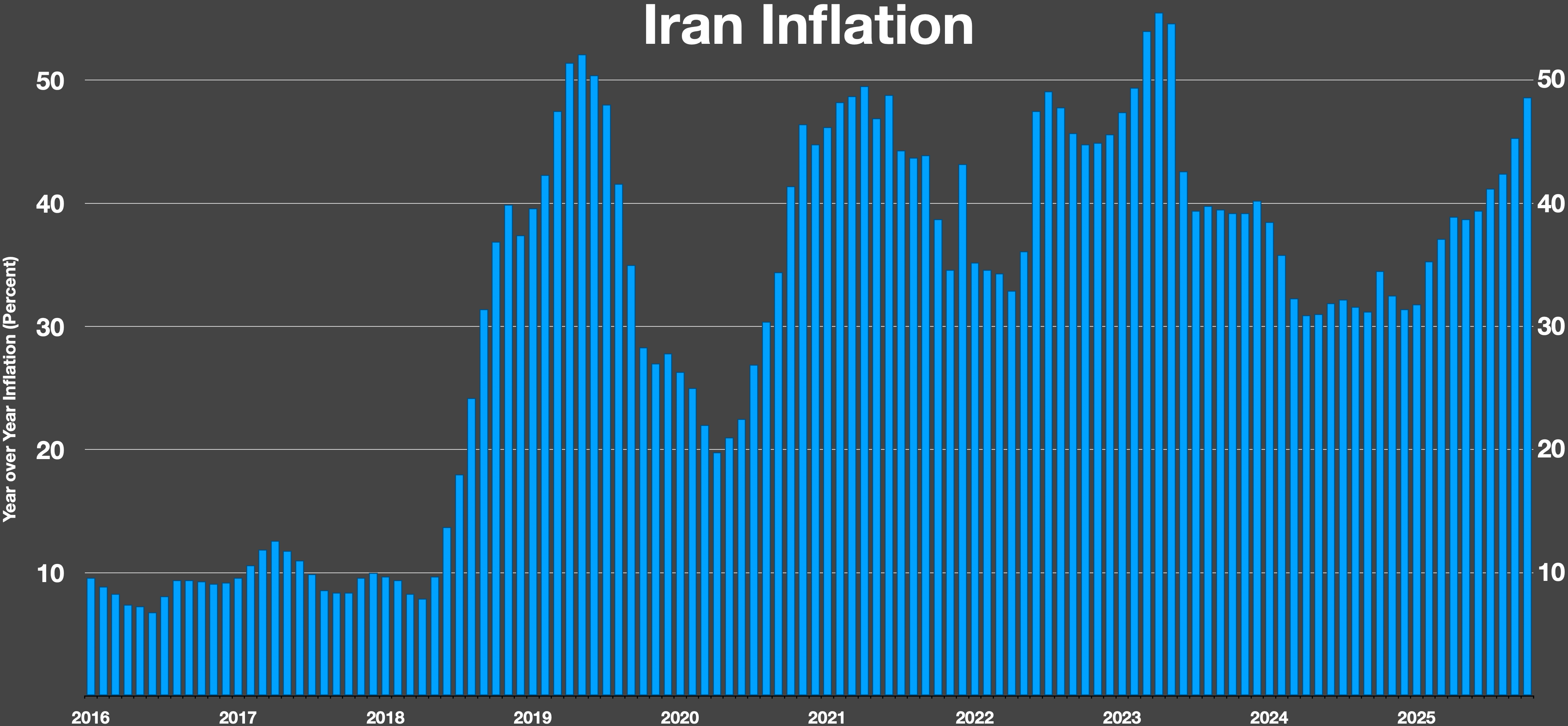
Inflation rate in Iran 2016–2026

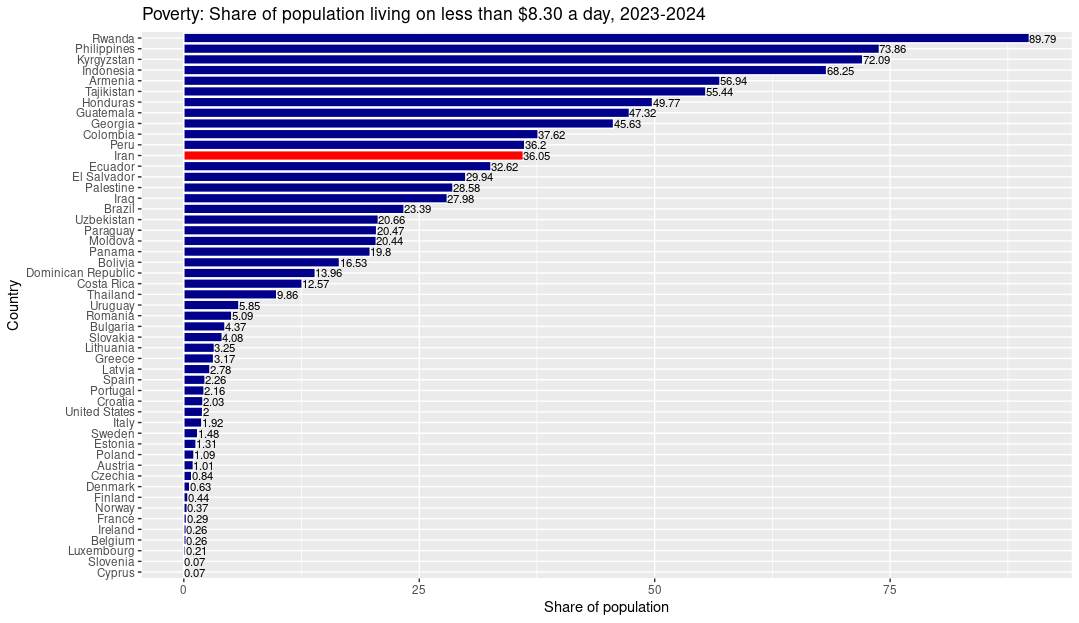
Poverty- Share of population living on less than $8.30 a day, 2023–2024

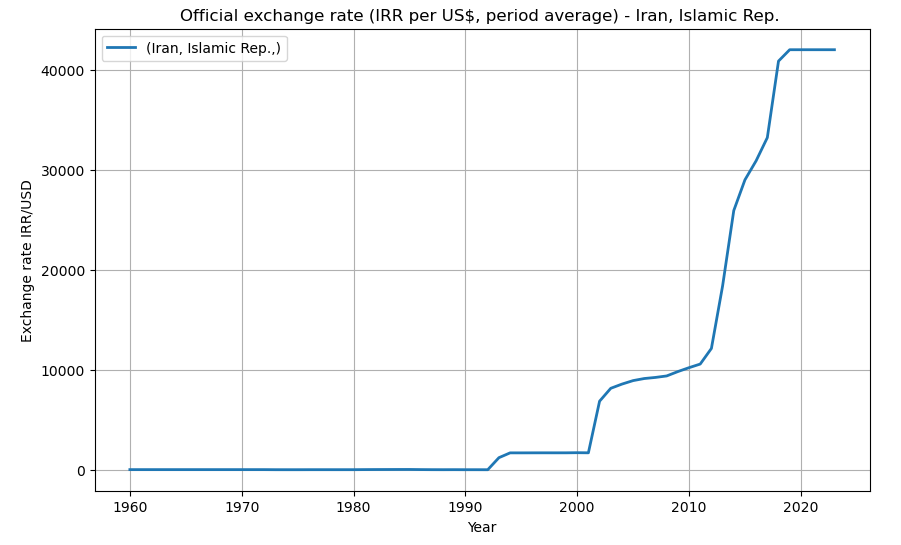
Official exchange rate (IRR per US$, period average) - Iran, Islamic Rep

The Iranian economic crisis is an ongoing period of severe financial instability in Iran that intensified in 2024. The downturn is rooted in long-standing issues such as domestic mismanagement, systemic corruption, and strict international sanctions. These structural problems were severely compounded by a United States naval blockade in mid-2026, which heavily restricted the country's oil exports and its integration with global markets.

Primary indicators of the crisis include hyperinflation, a historic depreciation of the Iranian rial, extensive energy and food shortages, and rising poverty. The deteriorating economic environment has driven widespread social unrest, culminating in nationwide protests, labour strikes, and a political crisis within the Iranian government. By late 2025, international analysts and media outlets widely described the Iranian economy as being on the verge of total collapse.

== Bread ration ==
In November 18 2026 long queues were reported at Iranian bread stores after the Islamic regime secretly implemented a monthly quota is about 8 kg of flour per person at a subsidized rate of 2,300 tomans, with excess purchases charged at a free-market rate of 12,650 tomans.

== Causes and background ==
The Iranian economy has faced persistent challenges from structural inefficiencies, geopolitical instability, and a systemic energy crisis since early 2024. These factors were exacerbated by the reimposition of a United States naval blockade on Iranian ports on 14 July 2026, a move that Iranian officials acknowledged had a severe domestic impact. The following month, on 19 August, US President Donald Trump formally announced a campaign of economic warfare against the Iranian government. The blockade and subsequent embargo severely curtailed Iran's oil exports and its capacity for global trade.

Tehran's Chamber of Commerce noted that existing land border corridors were insufficient to offset the loss of maritime routes. Combined with widespread public sector corruption, these supply pressures resulted in an estimated government budget deficit of 1,800 trillion tomans by late 2025. Concurrently, the Tehran Stock Exchange suffered repeated crashes amid vanishing investor confidence.

=== Oil dependence and sanctions ===
Since the Iranian Revolution, the Iranian state has relied heavily on oil revenues to fund its annual budget, leaving it highly vulnerable to fluctuations in market prices and international pressure. During the 2009 fiscal year, for example, the oil and gas sector accounted for 60% of the government's budget. Over the succeeding decades, Iran faced numerous strict sanctions related to its nuclear programme, its sponsorship of militant groups, and its human rights record. To circumvent financial restrictions during the crisis, the government bypassed the SWIFT system in favour of alternative financial platforms and barter agreements. One such deal involved trading natural gas for Pakistani rice, with transactions settled in Chinese Yuan.

=== Energy crisis ===
A major factor in the economic downturn has been the deterioration of Iran's power grid. Much of the country's energy distribution network and generation infrastructure was built decades ago and lacks adequate modernization. Historically, the government heavily subsidised energy prices to appease the public, a policy that encouraged widespread waste and discouraged infrastructure investment.

Consequently, rolling blackouts became routine, halting production in roughly half of Iran's industrial sector. When summer temperatures reached 40°C in 2026, the government implemented nationwide blackouts, and the Ministry of Industry ordered a complete shutdown of industrial activities. To stabilise the grid, Iran began trading oil for electricity imported from Turkey. The extreme heat and lack of reliable power, combined with the prohibitively high cost of air conditioning units, led to a surge in sales of traditional fans.

=== Twelve-Day War ===
During the broader Middle Eastern crisis, long-standing tensions with Israel escalated into open warfare in 2025. This followed Israeli strikes on Iranian civilian, military, and nuclear sites, initiating a series of retaliatory attacks throughout the region that further destabilised the domestic economy.

== Economic impact and living conditions ==
The prolonged crisis led to a severe decline in living standards. Iran's Statistics Organization reported an annual inflation rate between 88.6% and 200%—the highest recorded globally in half a century. On 24 August 2026, the Iranian rial fell to an all-time low, trading at 2,020,000 rials to one US dollar. In an effort to control inflation, the Central Bank of Iran (CBI) removed interest rate caps later that year.

Rates of poverty and unemployment increased sharply. In 2024, the Ministry of Cooperatives, Labour, and Social Welfare reported that 57% of the population suffered from malnourishment. Basic goods saw price increases of up to 400%; the cost of eggs, for example, tripled from 70,000 to 200,000 rials each. As the real minimum wage dropped below $100 a month, families frequently spent up to 70% of their income on food alone. With domestic consumers unable to afford products like fruit and dairy, Iranian agricultural companies redirected their yields toward export markets. Many citizens resorted to Buy Now, Pay Later (BNPL) instalment schemes just to purchase groceries. The CBI facilitated this by opening 90 million digital "Iran wallet" BNPL accounts linked to National ID cards, though it simultaneously raised electronic banking transaction fees by 60%.

The banking sector also experienced profound instability. Bank Noor and Ayandeh Bank collapsed in August 2026, leading to their forced merger into Bank Melli Iran. Around the same time, leaked documents controversially revealed that Bank Pasargad had issued loans of 1,000 billion tomans to select elite customers. By 2025, the government capped individuals at a maximum of 10 bank accounts. Furthermore, the Ministry of Economic's National Financial Information Center reported substantial capital flight, with large quantities of physical currency being smuggled to Iraq, Pakistan, and Afghanistan to fuel a growing underground economy.

Demographic shifts reflected the worsening conditions. Iran recorded its lowest birth rate in 70 years, alongside a plummeting marriage rate. The Statistical Centre of Iran reported an 11% drop in the birth rate for second children. Rising costs of motherhood prompted many women to freeze their eggs to delay childbearing. Additionally, severe budget shortfalls forced the State Welfare Organization (Behzisti) to suspend disability payments.

=== Housing and gig economy ===
In July 2026, a post-war spike in property prices resulted in housing costs consuming roughly half of the average household income. The government responded by forming the National Housing Committee, which froze rent increases at a 25% cap and created an online portal for tenants to report non-compliant landlords. The Minister of Housing also allocated supplementary loans aimed at completing unfinished construction projects.

The service and gig economies suffered alongside the housing market. Ride-hailing drivers were systematically denied social security insurance coverage due to overarching shortages. Social restrictions further strained local businesses; in August 2026, authorities sealed numerous cafes for non-compliance with the state's Islamic dress code. Meanwhile, the tourism industry essentially ceased operations due to failing infrastructure and international isolation.

=== Healthcare and drug use ===
A nationwide medicine shortage developed as prescription drug prices soared and government subsidies went unpaid. Unable to afford clinical care, a growing number of Iranians turned to artificial intelligence for self-diagnosis. Addiction treatment clinics faced closures after the cost of necessary medications rose by 30%. Concurrently, illicit poppy cultivation expanded by 246%, encompassing over 32,000 hectares and replacing traditional rice farming in some provinces. Authorities also noted a significant increase in cannabis consumption, particularly among women.

== Social unrest and political response ==
The convergence of economic collapse and energy shortages catalysed massive social upheaval, most notably during the nationwide May 2025 Iranian protests, which were accompanied by widespread strikes in the transport sector. Iran's misery index reached a historic high of 91%, peaking at 96.3% in the Kurdistan region. According to a leaked presidential report published by IranWire, the country's "national anger rate" stood at 63.6%—purportedly the highest level ever recorded globally, exceeding previous benchmark highs in Chad.

By 2026, the government struggled to fund basic obligations, including food stamps and salaries for military and police personnel. In response, President Masoud Pezeshkian diverted 20 million barrels of oil specifically to finance the Islamic Revolutionary Guard Corps (IRGC). Civil disobedience grew frequent, with regular protests by pensioners and strikes by municipal workers over mass layoffs and unpaid wages.

To suppress dissent over the economic reality, lawmakers passed strict "countering influence" legislation. The law established penalties of up to 30 years in prison for leaking government statistics or advocating unauthorised policy changes. However, internal divisions became public when parliament speaker Mohammad Bagher Ghalibaf warned that the political establishment might not survive the threat of mass starvation.

== Timeline ==
- December 2024: On 27 December, the Central Bank blocked the accounts and payment terminals of all cryptocurrency-to-fiat exchange platforms. Late in the month, parliament members began openly warning of potential famines. Crown Prince Reza Pahlavi publicly attributed the depreciating rial to government incompetence.
- January 2025: Several major corporations, including Iran Hyper Star, ceased operations in Iran. The Majlis attempted an unsuccessful impeachment vote against the Ministers of Petroleum and Economic Affairs. President Pezeshkian reported that the private sector had suffered 175,000 billion tomans in losses over the previous nine months. Runaway inflation rendered basic staples like meat and cooking oil unaffordable for most citizens. Furthermore, government data indicated a severe brain drain and educational crisis: over 50,000 students and 3,000 female nurses were emigrating annually, alongside 950,000 domestic school dropouts recorded in the preceding year.
- February 2025: A massive blackout on 11 February affected Tehran and other major cities. The following day, the Social Security Organization more than doubled the prices of 400 essential medications.
- March 2025: The Minister of Economic Affairs and Finances was impeached on 1 March. This occurred days after Vice President Mohammad Javad Zarif resigned amid mounting public pressure, while calls for the president's resignation also intensified. By 19 March, the exchange rate surpassed 1,000,000 rials to the US dollar, making it the world's least valuable currency.
- 2026: By January 2026, the rial's value dropped from approximately 42,000 to over 1.1 million against the US dollar, virtually eliminating international purchasing power. Retirees, merchants, and workers routinely protested in major cities, including Tehran, Isfahan, and Ahvaz, carrying banners demanding basic healthcare and criticizing government spending on foreign conflicts rather than domestic welfare.

== Impact ==
The weight of international sanctions and mounting American pressure caused a drastic decline in foreign investment. Government officials frequently voiced concerns about the potential for a popular uprising; as early as November 2024, the newspaper Jomhouri-e-Islami warned the government to "fear the revolution of the army of the hungry." In April 2025, Masoud Nili, an economic advisor to former president Hassan Rouhani, stated that the economy was fundamentally broken due to decades of corruption, low productivity, and heavy reliance on oil exports.

=== 2025–2026 protests ===
Mass demonstrations erupted nationwide in late 2025, fueled by outrage over the collapsing economy. Initially spearheaded by bazaar merchants and shopkeepers in Tehran, the movement rapidly spread to universities and major urban centres like Isfahan, Shiraz, and Mashhad. The unrest soon eclipsed the 2022 Mahsa Amini protests in scale. Protesters' demands broadened from economic relief to political reform and the overthrow of the Islamic Republic, featuring chants such as "Death to the Dictator".

State security forces suppressed the demonstrations using lethal force and tear gas. The subsequent crackdown resulted in severe casualties, marking one of the largest massacres in modern Iranian history. Death toll estimates vary widely, ranging from 3,117 according to the Iranian government to upwards of 36,500 reported by Iran International. Following the violence and a corresponding 2026 Internet blackout in Iran, the economic landscape deteriorated further, characterised by a frozen job market and widespread business closures.

== See also ==
- Economy of Iran
- Iranian energy crisis
