= Mehdi Rahimi =

Iranian general (1921–1979)

Timsar Mehdi Rahimi
- مهدی رحیمی
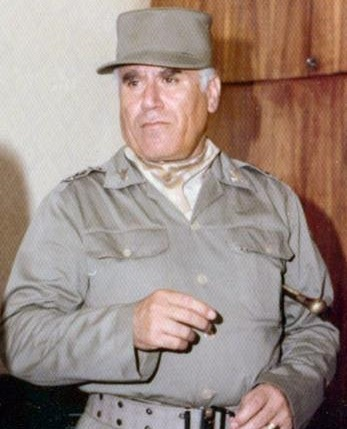

Chief of the Shahrbani
- In office 13 January 1979 – 11 February 1979
- Monarch: Mohammad Reza Pahlavi
- Prime Minister: Gholam Reza Azhari; Shapour Bakhtiar
- Preceded by: Samad Samadianpour
- Succeeded by: Mohammad Ali Norouzi

Personal details
- Born: 24 March 1921 Tehran, Qajar Iran
- Died: 15 February 1979 (aged 57) Refah School, Tehran, Iran

Military service
- Allegiance: Pahlavi Iran
- Branch/service: Imperial Iranian Ground Force
- Years of service: 1941–1979
- Rank: Lieutenant general

Mehdi Rahimi (Persian: مهدی رحیمی; 24 March 1921 – 15 February 1979) was an Iranian lieutenant general. He was executed following the 1979 Iranian Revolution.

== Early life ==
Mehdi Rahimi was born in 1921, in Tehran, Qajar Iran.

== Career ==
Rahimi served as deputy commander of the Imperial Guard, Tehran police chief as well as the president of the Wrestling Federation of Iran. He was a lieutenant general and the last military commander and the chief of police of Tehran during the final days of the Pahlavi era and before Tehran fell to the revolutionary forces of the 1979 Iranian Revolution. General Rahimi decided not to use his 30,000 loyal Immortal Guards to crush the rebellion for fear of producing civilian casualties.

== Arrest and execution ==
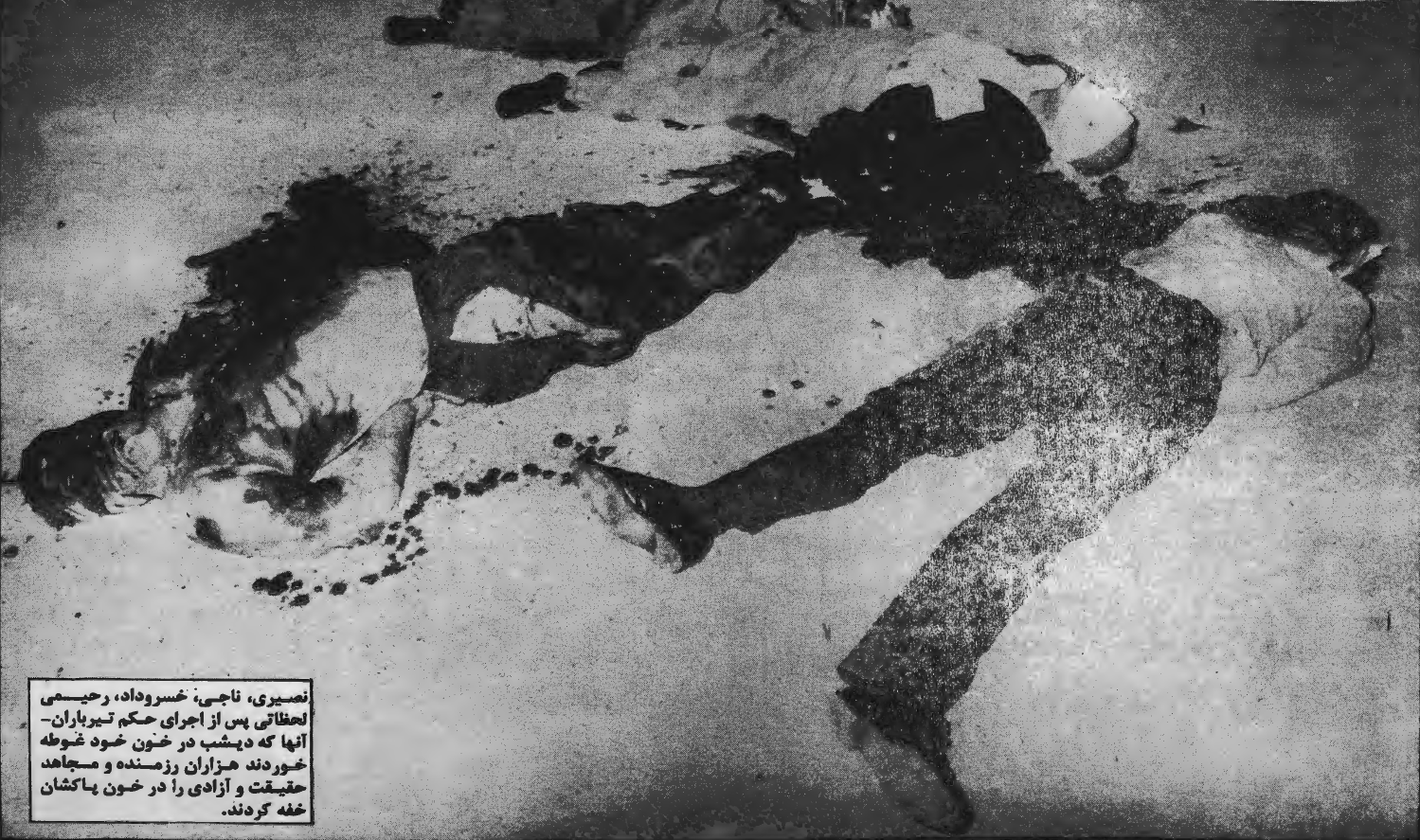
The aftermath of the execution by firing squad photographed and published to Kayhan (the execution of Rahimi, Naji, Nassiri and Khosrodad – 15 February 1979)

Shortly after the Iranian Revolution in February 1979 and the takeover of all military bases and police stations by the pro-Khomeini Islamists, Rahimi was spotted by a subordinate as he was walking away from a military base near Sepah Square and arrested. By his own account as stated during his televised interrogation, Rahimi was beaten and tortured by the Islamic revolutionaries, arrested and taken to Refah School in Central Tehran. The interrogation which lasted 5 hours, resulted in a death sentence for Rahimi, as well as three other high-profile generals of the former regime. Sadegh Khalkhali presided over the proceedings and announced his death sentence on the charge of "Warring with God" and "Corrupter on Earth".

Rahimi was executed by a firing squad at midnight just before 16 February 1979, on the rooftop of Refah School, which was used as a temporary residence by Ayatollah Khomeini. He refused to be blindfolded and stated that he wanted to die like a general loyal to his commander-in-chief. It has been said that his last words were "Javid Shah" ("long live the Shah") and the expression of loyalty to Iran.

Major Iranian newspapers published the news of his execution on the morning of 16 February 1979 along with gruesome pictures of his body as well as those of other executed generals. The pictures of him reflect the fact that his right arm was severed before the execution.

== Personal life ==
Rahimi married twice. His first wife was a French woman, and they divorced. He was survived by his second wife, Manijeh, who settled in London. She was a sister of Parviz Fatemi, widow of Hossein Fatemi.
