= Long Live the Queen =

Long Live the Queen may refer to:

- "The king is dead, long live the king!", proclamation made following the accession of a new monarch
- Long Live the Queen (film), a 1995 Dutch film
- "Long Live The Queen" (song), a song by UK singer-songwriter Frank Turner
- "Long Live the Queen" (Charmed), an episode of the television series Charmed
- Long Live the Queen (video game), a 2012 PC video game by Hanako Games
- "Long Live the Queen", an episode from The Legend of Korra TV series

== See also ==
- Long Live the Queens!, an album by British pop music duo Shakespears Sister
