= Refah School =

Cultural and educational institution in Iran

Cultural Foundation of Refah
- بنیاد فرهنگی رفاه
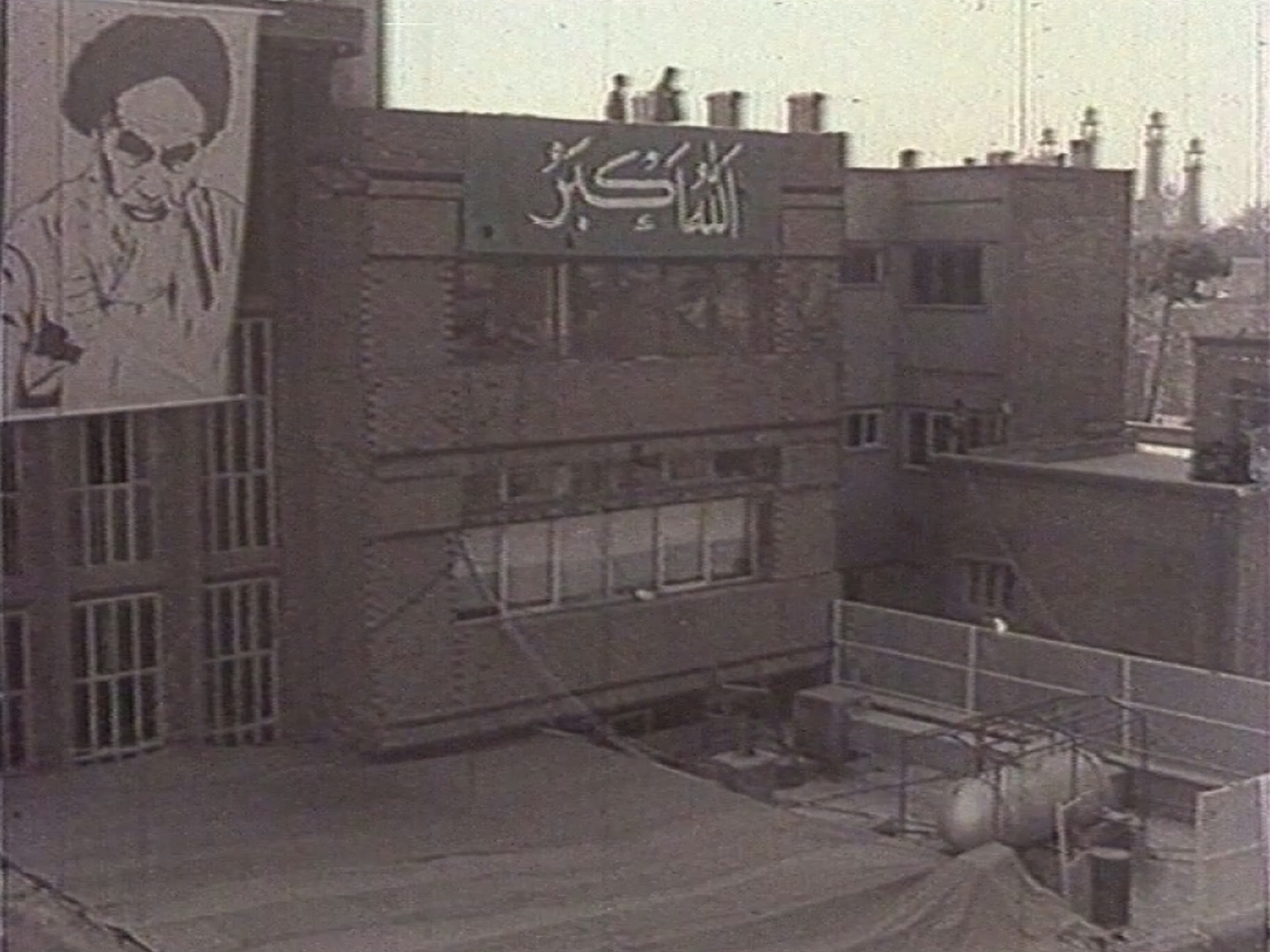
- The exterior of the Refah school displaying a poster of Ayatollah Khomeini in February 1979

Location
- Tehran, Tehran County, Tehran province Iran
- Coordinates: 35°41′27.18″N 51°26′27.21″E

Information
- Former name: Refah School; (مدرسه دخترانه رفاه)
- Religious affiliation: Islam
- Denomination: Shi'a
- Established: 1968

Cultural Foundation of Refah (Persian: بنیاد فرهنگی رفاه) (formerly Refah School Persian: مدرسه دخترانه رفاه) was an elementary school for girls in Tehran, Iran. It gained historical significance in the 1979 Iranian Revolution when it was the temporary headquarters of the revolutionists led by Ruhollah Khomeini. It was also used for the Islamic Revolutionary Court and the execution of officials of the second Pahlavi Regime on its rooftop before being transformed into what is being currently used as, a cultural and educational institution.

It is located next to the Islamic Consultative Assembly building and the Sepahsalar Mosque.

== History ==
=== Background ===
Refah school was established in 1968 by Bazaaris with cooperation of the clergy and influencers such as Mohammad Beheshti, Mohammad-Javad Bahonar, Mohammad-Ali Rajai and Akbar Hashemi Rafsanjani. According to Rafsanjani, The idea of the school originated from a conversation he had with a group of influential Bazaaris whom he had close ties to, with the goal of fulfilling the need of a girl-exclusive school with conservative viewpoints in a bazaari-majority district. He then added,

"The deceased Akhavan Farshchi purchased for this school 3000 square metres of land and, through weekly meetings, which were based around jihadist topics, with the help of fundamental companions we succeeded in founding this place."

=== During the Revolution ===
==== February 1st to 11th ====
On February 1, 1979, with the help of Bazaaris, the school was turned into a headquarters for the leader of the revolution, Ruhollah Khomeini, and the revolutionary operations. Due to the influence of Khomeini's followers, the school was chosen as a safe and temporary residence for Khomeini and the base of the revolutionary operations. It was designed so that:

- The underground floor was the prayer room and the dining hall
- The 1st floor was for the press and reporters
- The 2nd floor was the residence of Ayatollah Khomeini and his close followers
- The 3rd floor was the base of operations of the Council of the Islamic Revolution

The school was used by the Council through meetings planning the Interim Government and several discussions at night time. It was similar to Khomeini's campaign in Neauphle-le-Château. Although the school was now more in the control of the clergy than Khomeini's non-clergy assistants, such as Sadegh Ghotbzadeh and Ebrahim Yazdi. It was at this school and time were Khomeini and his long-distant followers become close admirers. It also showcased Khomeini's tendency to give the Clergy a superior role in the future political system.

The school however could not be used for the people's visit to the Ayatollah for the fact that it could not hold the large groups of people who had come to meet Khomeini. Therefore, the Alavi school, which was close to the Refah school and was also built by the Bazaaris, was used for that intention exclusively.

On February 9, the school's underground was transformed into a weapons storage room when a weapons factory near the Doshan Tappeh Air Base was seized by armed rebellions. With the help of Mohammad-Ali Rajai and Hussein-Ali Montazeri, the weapons were distributed between revolutionaries, who were later able to emerge victorious in a battle against the Shah's Imperial Guard.

==== After February 11 ====
As the control of Tehran was being lost to the revolutionaries, many Pahlavi regime officials were arrested by Islamic-Marxist guerrillas, where high-ranking officials were transported to the school's underground, where it was transformed into a temporary prison. The proximity of the jailed regime officers and Ayatollah Khomeini prompted his companions to move his residence to the Alavi school to secure his full safety.

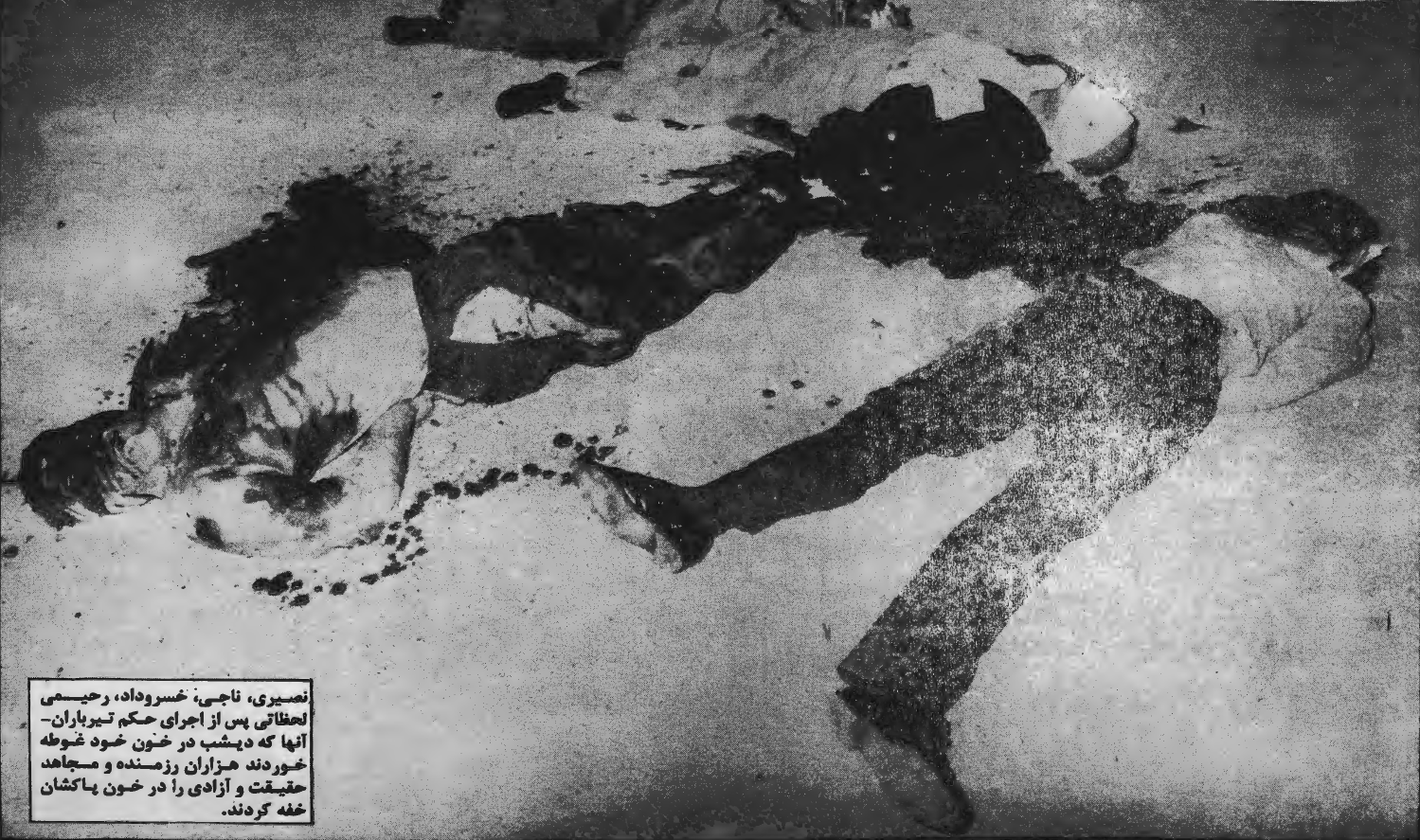
The aftermath of the execution by firing squad photographed and published to Kayhan (the execution of Rahimi, Naji, Nassiri and Khosrodad – 15 February 1979)

For various reasons such as fear of coup d'état by the military and the calls for the Pahlavi regime officials to be tried and be executed by Khomeini and his followers, dozens of high-ranking officials were rounded up in the school and were tried by the Islamic Revolutionary Court in the matter of hours each and were all executed for various charges such as "spreading corruption on earth" and treason. The courts were led by Sadegh Khalkhali and ultimately Khomeini gave the last word for all actions to be taken. After the trials, the defendants who were sentenced to death were executed by firing squads on the rooftop of the school which resulted in windows being shattered on many nearby buildings. Building owners and occupiers who voiced complaints over the damage were executed without trial.

The first officials who were sentenced to firing squad were Nematollah Nassiri, head of SAVAK, Mehdi Rahimi, Tehran's chief of police, and Army Major Generals Manouchehr Khosrodad and Reza Naji (Iranian general). They were executed at midnight of February 15, 1979. By spring 1979, the number of executions on the rooftop of the Refah school had reached dozens.

The school had become infamous for its scenes of the executions being photographed and published in newspapers such as Kayhan and Ettela'at.

=== Today ===
After Khomeini's residence was moved in Jamaran, Refah school was transformed into a Cultural and educational Institute with the aims of Islamic and cultural education. According to Rafsanjani, there had been plans of extending the institute to an elementary school and college for girls.
