= Death to Khamenei =

Political slogan in Iran

Death to Khamenei (Persian: مرگ بر خامنه‌ای, romanized: Marg bar Khāmene'i) is a political slogan in Iran that was first chanted during the 2009 Iranian presidential election protests.

The slogan was used as a strong expression against the former Supreme Leader of Iran and the Islamic Republic of Iran, especially during protests, as protesters hold Khamenei personally responsible for violent crackdowns. This slogan, which had first appeared in 2009, has been widely used by protestors since then. Many citizens would shout it every evening at 8 PM from balconies and windows.

== History ==
The slogan "Death to Khamenei" was first chanted during the 2009 Iranian presidential election protests, and has since been used repeatedly in subsequent protests.

=== 2017–2018 protests ===
During the 2017–2018 Iranian protests, slogans such as "Death to Khamenei" and "Khamenei, be ashamed, leave the country" were chanted.

=== 2018 protests ===
During the 2018 Iranian protests, in addition to "Death to Khamenei," slogans included "Neither Gaza nor Lebanon, My Life for Iran," "Reza Shah, rest in peace," "Enough already, show your honor," "Reformists, Principlists, the game is over," and "Our enemy is right here, they lie it's America."

=== 2019 protests ===
In the 2019–2020 Iranian protests, as protests intensified, people chanted "Death to Khamenei."

=== 2020 protests ===
During the 2020 Iranian protests following the downing of Ukraine International Airlines Flight 752 by the Islamic Revolutionary Guard Corps (IRGC) air defense, protesters chanted against Khamenei and the IRGC, with slogans such as "Death to the Dictator," "Death to Khamenei," "Shame on us, shame on our foolish leader," and "We did not sacrifice lives to compromise and praise the murderous leader."

=== 2021–2022 Iranian protests ===
During the 2021 Iranian water protests in Khuzestan, people in Izeh held rallies supporting water protests, chanting "Death to Khamenei" and "Khamenei is a murderer, his rule is invalid."

At the funeral of Hadi Bahmani, a 17-year-old killed in these protests, people chanted "Death to Khamenei."

In solidarity protests in Tehran, people chanted slogans like "Death to the Dictator," "Death to Khamenei," "From Tehran to Khuzestan, unity, unity," and others.

During the twelfth night of protests, despite severe internet disruptions, protesters chanted "Death to Khamenei" from rooftops and windows.

==== Meta's content removal ====
Amidst the 2021–2022 Iranian protests, Meta removed Instagram posts featuring "Death to Khamenei," citing "content violating anti-violence policies." Activists argued that the slogan expresses opposition to the regime, comparable to "Damn Trump." Meta temporarily allowed posts containing the slogan and later clarified it does not consider it a call to violence.

In January 2023, Meta's Oversight Board ruled that Facebook and Instagram should not censor "Death to Khamenei" posts, stating it expresses a call for the downfall of the current government and its leader, rather than violence against Khamenei himself.

=== 2022–2023 nationwide protests ===
During the 2022 Iranian protests following the death of Mahsa Amini, slogans "Women, Life, Freedom," "Death to the Dictator," and "Death to Khamenei" became widely used.

Students at Kharazmi University stomped on Khamenei's photo while chanting anti-government slogans.

The slogan was also chanted by diaspora protesters in Berlin.

On 2 November 2022, in northern Chitgar, Tehran, schoolgirls chanted "Death to Khamenei" and "Damn Khomeini."

Nightly rooftop chants of "Death to Khamenei" continued during the protests.

Some media described these protests as a revolution.

=== 2025–2026 nationwide protests ===
Beginning on 28 December 2025, mass demonstrations erupted across multiple cities in Iran amid widespread dissatisfaction with the Islamic republic government. Following the assassination of Ali Khamenei, "Death to Khamenei" was directed at the new supreme leader Mojtaba Khamenei, Khamenei's son.

== Related slogans ==
- "Khamenei is a murderer, his rule is invalid"
- "Incompetent leader, we don’t want you"
- "Khamenei, be ashamed, leave the country"
- "Tanks, missiles, fireworks — Khamenei is a pimp"
- "This year is bloody, Seyyed Ali will be overthrown"
- "Khamenei the Zahhak, we will bury you"
- "Dictator, say goodbye"
- "Death to Mojtaba"

== See also ==
- Death to the Dictator
- Political slogans against the Islamic Republic of Iran
- Assassination of Ali Khamenei
