= The king is dead, long live the king! =

Proclamation

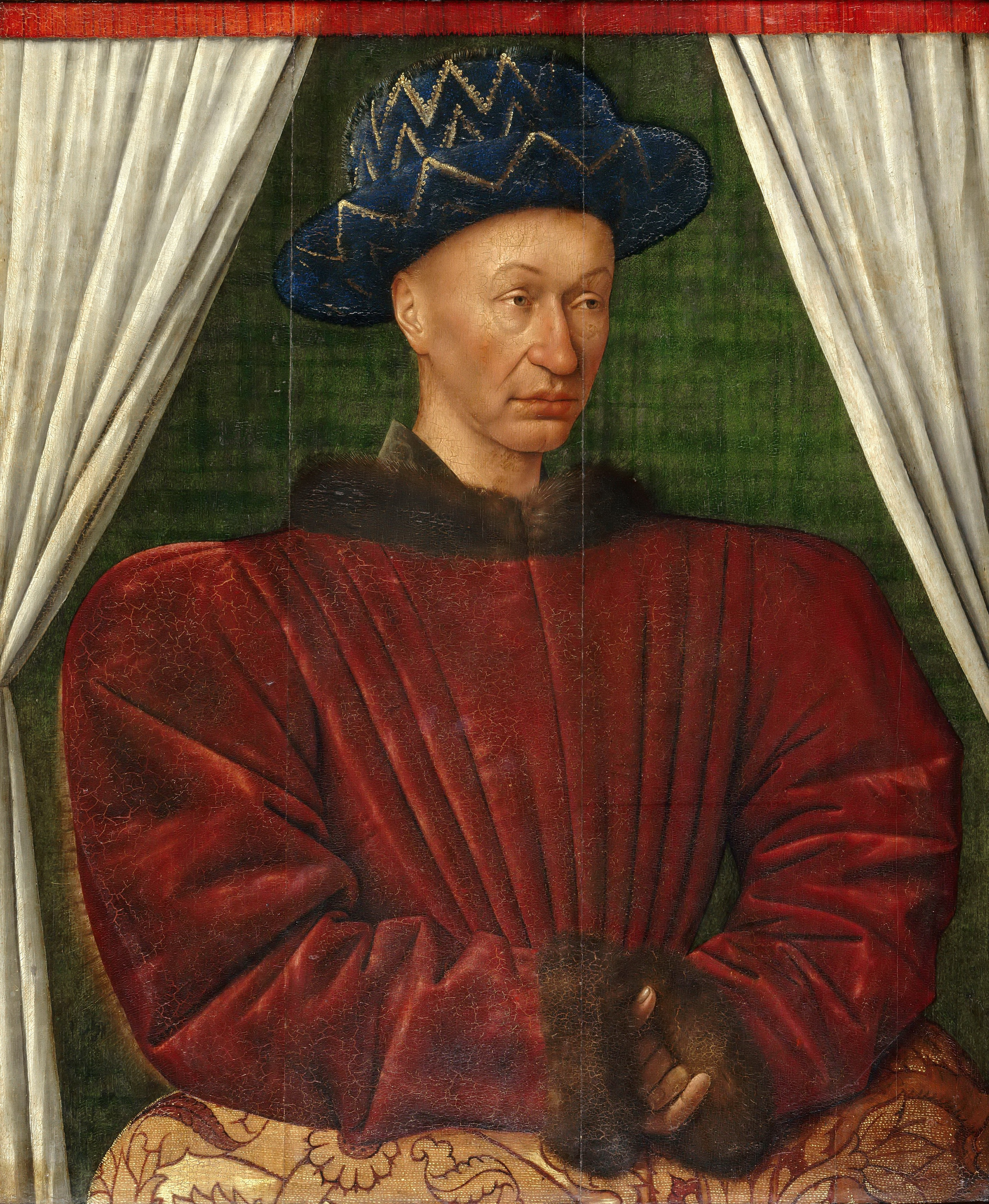
The phrase "The king is dead, long live the king!" was first declared upon the death of King Charles VI in 1422, proclaiming his son Charles VII (shown above) king of France.

"The king is dead, long live the king!" (Note: The exact punctuation used when written varies from source to source, with the comma on occasion being replaced by a full stop, a semicolon, a colon, or a dash.) is a traditional proclamation made following the accession of a new monarch in various countries. The seemingly contradictory phrase simultaneously announces the death of the previous monarch and asserts continuity by saluting the new monarch. The original phrase came from Middle French (Le roy est mort, vive le roy!), which was first declared upon the accession to the French throne of Charles VII after the death of his father Charles VI in 1422.

== Origin ==
The original phrase, now translated into modern French (Le roi est mort, vive le roi!), was first declared upon the accession to the French throne of Charles VII after the death of his father Charles VI in 1422. In France, the declaration was traditionally made by the Duke of Uzès, the senior peer of France, as soon as the coffin containing the remains of the previous king descended into the vault of the Basilica of Saint-Denis in northern Paris. The phrase arose from the law of le mort saisit le vif—that the transfer of sovereignty occurs instantaneously upon the moment of death of the previous monarch. "The King is dead" is the announcement of a monarch who has just died. "Long live The King!" refers to the heir who immediately succeeds to a throne upon the death of the preceding monarch.

At the time, French was the primary language of the nobility in England, and the proclamation was quickly taken up as ideally representing the same tradition—which in England dates back to 1272, when Henry III died while his son, Edward I, was fighting in the Crusades. To avoid any chance of a war of succession erupting over the order of succession, the Royal Council proclaimed: "The throne shall never be empty; the country shall never be without a monarch." Thus, Edward was declared king immediately, and he reigned in absentia until news of his father's death reached him and he returned to England.

== Usage ==
In some monarchies, such as the United Kingdom, an interregnum is usually avoided by using the idea of immediate transfer of power behind the phrase (i.e., the heir to the throne becomes the new monarch immediately on their predecessor's death). This phrase implies the continuity of sovereignty, attached to a personal form of power named auctoritas. This is not so in some other monarchies where the new monarch's reign begins only with a coronation or some other formal or traditional event. In the Polish–Lithuanian Commonwealth for instance, kings were elected in a regular formalised procedure, which often led to relatively long interregna. During that time, the Polish primate served as an 'interrex' (ruler between kings). Ernst Kantorowicz's theory of the king's two bodies (1957) showed how auctoritas (Kantorowicz preferred dignitas) was transferred from the defunct sovereign to the new one.

In monarchies which permit female succession to the throne, "king" can be replaced by "queen" where appropriate.

In Denmark, the phrase forms a key part of the proclamation of the Danish monarch by the prime minister. It was also used by Prayut Chan-o-cha and Jonas Gahr Støre, prime ministers of Thailand and Norway respectively, to conclude national addresses in connection to the deaths of kings Bhumibol Adulyadej in 2016 and Harald V in 2026.

=== Non-monarchical usage ===
Robert Cecil, one of the architects of the League of Nations, concluded his speech at the final session of the League of Nations in 1946 with the statement: "The League is dead. Long live the United Nations."

== See also ==
- Demise of the Crown – British and Commonwealth legal term for transfer of Crown
