= Manouchehr Khosrodad =

Iranian military major general

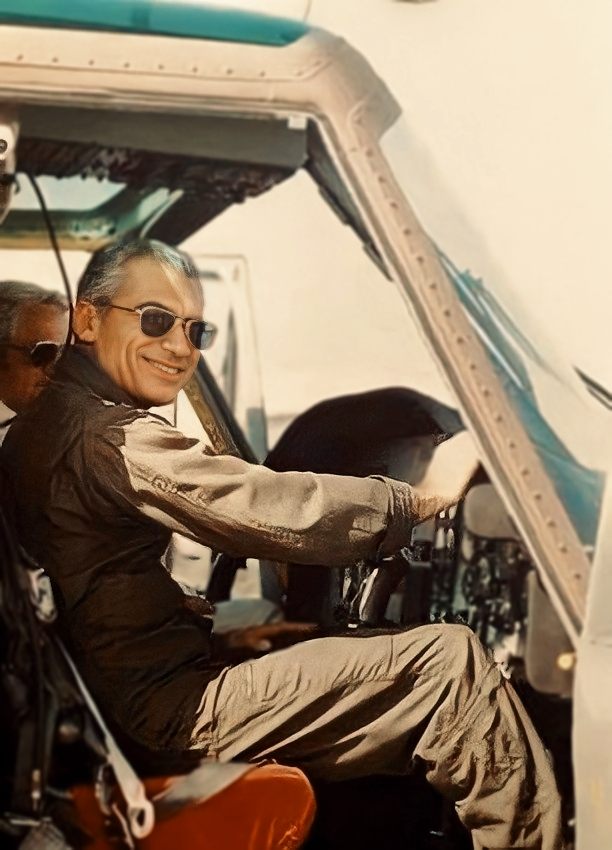
- General Manouchehr Khosrodad
- Born: 10 February 1927; Amol, Pahlavi Iran
- Died: 15 February 1979 (aged 52); Refah School, Tehran, Iran
- Burial place: Behesht-e Zahra
- Alma mater: École spéciale militaire de Saint-Cyr
- Military career
- Allegiance: Pahlavi Iran
- Branch: Imperial Iranian Army Aviation
- Service years: 1946–1979
- Rank: Major general
- Commands: Imperial Iranian Army Aviation
- Conflicts: Dhofar rebellion
- Awards: Order of the Lion and the Sun

Manouchehr Khosrodad (Persian: منوچهر خسروداد; 1927 – 15 February 1979) was an Iranian military major general. He was a loyal supporter of the Shah, Mohammed Reza Pahlavi, the final monarch of Iran who ruled from 1941 to 1979. He was executed following the Iranian Revolution of 1979. Khosrodad was a helicopter pilot, Head of the Equestrian Federation of Iran and a champion in horseback and also enjoyed skiing. Khosrodad was the founder and the first commander of 65th Airborne Special Forces Brigade. He had studied at American Defense Academy and the French military school, Saint Cyr, and Switzerland. He spoke English and French. Before the fall of the government in the Iranian Revolution, he believed that religion should not be involved in politics.

== Life ==
=== Military career ===
Manouchehr Khosrovadad, son of Mohammad Ali, was born in 1927 in Amol. After earning his high school diploma in 1946, he joined the army and continued his education at the military high school. Khosrovadad was fluent in both French and English. He was divorced and lived with his only daughter. His brother, Colonel Amir Khosrovadad, also served in the Army Aviation.

On 14 February 1963, following the establishment of the Army Aviation, the Ground Forces decided to train qualified officers for its command. Khosrovadad was selected for this mission and sent to the United States, where he completed U.S. Army regulations and training, including transport helicopter OH-58 courses and several others at Maxwell Air Force Base, Alabama. He then went to France to study at the Saint-Cyr Military Academy, and later to Switzerland to receive mountain warfare training from Royal Military Academy Sandhurst officers.

After returning to Iran in March 1972, he was appointed commander of the Army Aviation and became aide-de-camp to the Chief of Ground Forces. He was promoted to Major General in April 1975. Over time, Khosrovadad was stationed at the 23rd Airborne Brigade of the Air Force Special Forces and, with American instructors and the special forces (NOHED), helped establish the Iranian Green Berets.

On 29 April 1975, in Ahvaz, along with Colonel E. B. Beely, chief test pilot at Bell Helicopter, he set five new flight records with the first Bell-214 production model delivered to Iran. Their helicopter reached 3,000 meters in 1 minute 58 seconds, 6,000 meters in 5 minutes 13 seconds, surpassed 9,000 meters in 15 minutes 5 seconds, stayed 30 seconds at 9,010 meters, and touched a maximum of 9,070 meters—setting five new records in the medium helicopter class.

After completing various military courses in Army Aviation, Khosrovadad served as the second commander of the brigade after Abbas Ghandahari until the 1979 revolution. He was also deployed with the airborne battalion to the Dhofar War. Khosrovadad was known as a record-breaking pilot who surpassed the previous ascent record held by U.S. officer Colonel Beely. He was the second and last commander of Army Aviation.

=== Death ===
Khosrodad was executed by the Islamist revolutionaries following the Iranian Revolution in 15 February 1979. He is buried in Behesht-e Zahra.

Sources: Wikipedia – Manouchehr Khosrovadad (Persian)
