= Reza Naji (Iranian general) =

Iranian military governor (1923–1979)

Timsar Reza Naji
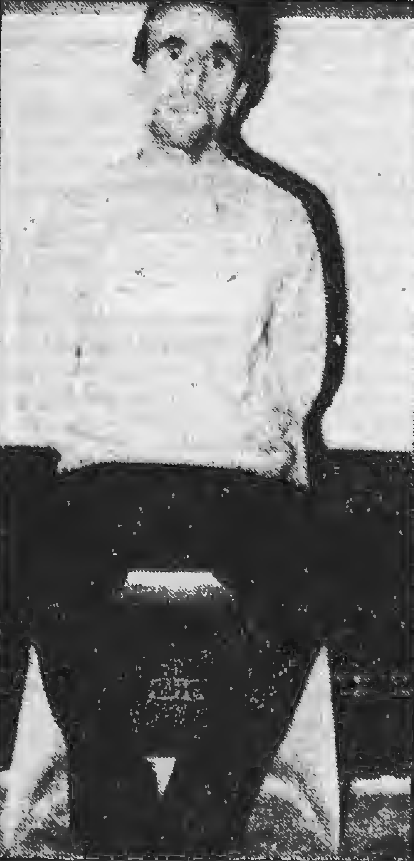
- Born: 27 June 1923; Isfahan, Sublime State of Iran
- Died: 15 February 1979 (aged 55) Tehran, Iran
- Allegiance: Imperial State of Iran
- Branch: Imperial Iranian Army
- Service years: 1943–1979
- Rank: Major General
- Alma mater: Officers' School

Reza Naji (Persian: سید رضا ناجی; 27 June 1923 – 15 February 1979) was an Iranian general and Military Governor of Isfahan during the 1979 Iranian Revolution.

After the revolution, he was arrested, tried, and sentenced to death by the Revolutionary Court of Sadegh Khalkhali. His sentence and that of three other army commanders was carried out on 15 February 1979, on the roof of the Refah School located on Ain al-Dowleh Street, Tehran. His body was buried in Behesht-e Zahra.

Immediately after his revolutionary execution and that of other officials of the former regime, young people stationed around the Revolutionary Committee and in the streets of Iran and Jaleh began firing to the air, expressing their joy at the incident. The news of the group's execution reached the residents of the streets around the Revolutionary Committee through a loudspeaker.
