= Death to the Dictator =

Political slogan in Iran

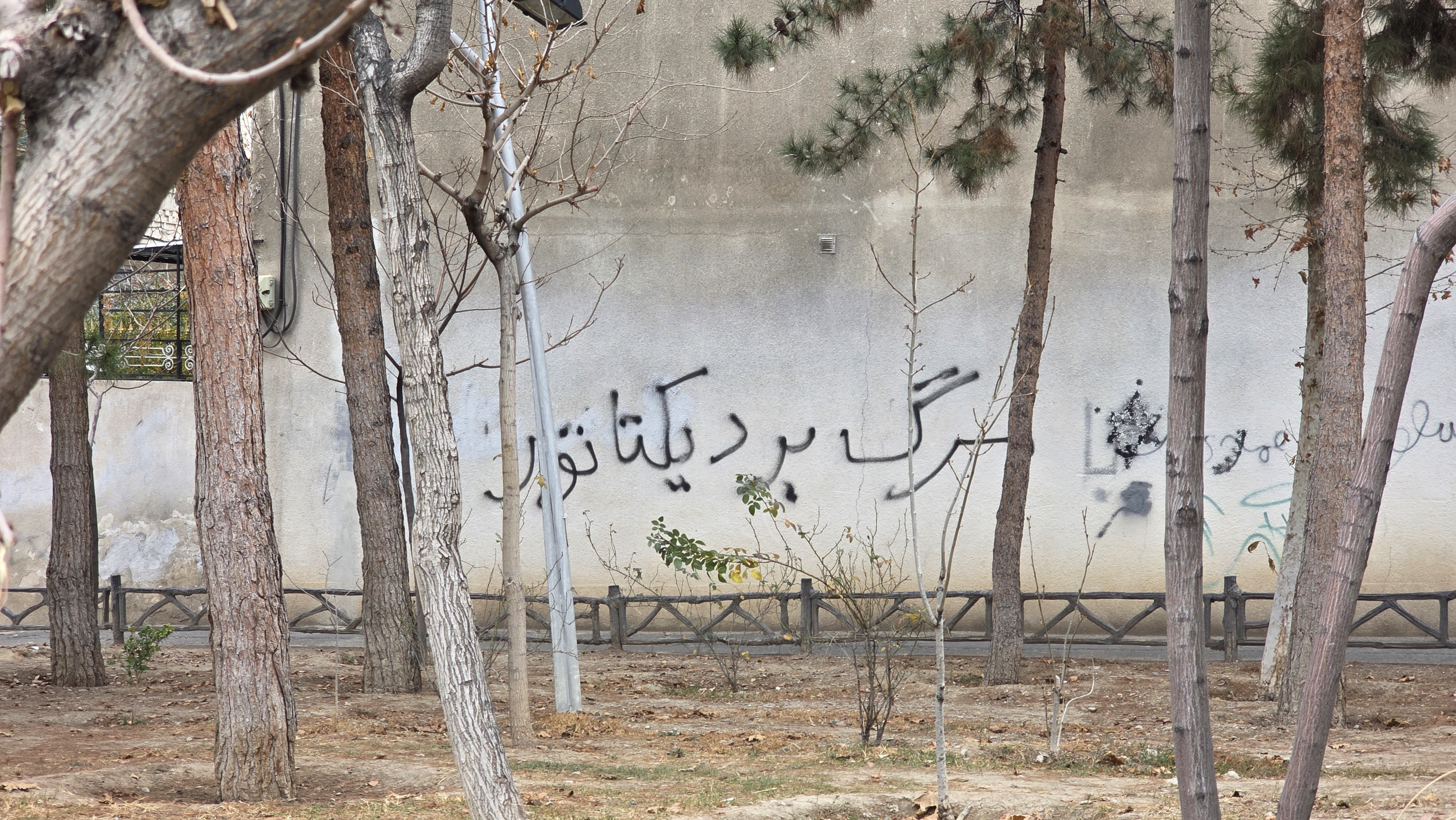
"Death to the Dictator" slogan on the wall during the 2025–2026 Iranian protests

"Death to the Dictator" (Persian: مرگ بر دیکتاتور, romanized: Marg bar Dīktātor) is a widely used political slogan against the Islamic Republic of Iran often chanted by Iranian protesters, especially during the 2022 protests and 2025–2026 protests, in streets and public places or written on walls and public passages.

The target of these slogans was primarily Ali Khamenei, the former Supreme Leader of the Islamic Republic of Iran. The slogan has also been used historically in protests against dictatorial and monarchical regimes in other countries and against the former Shah.

== Background ==
=== Islamic Republic period ===
In May 2022, following the sharp increase in prices of essential goods, protests erupted in several Iranian cities with chants of "Death to the Dictator."

In August 2022, amid the water crisis in Khuzestan, protesters in Khuzestan and neighboring provinces opposed water transfers and mismanagement by the IRGC and government, chanting "Death to the Dictator."

==== 2022 Iranian protests ====
On 3 November 2022, during the 40th day commemoration of some victims of the 2022 Iranian protests in Karaj, large crowds gathered on Beheshti Boulevard chanting slogans such as "Khamenei is a murderer, his rule is invalid," "Death to the Dictator," and "Freedom, Freedom, Freedom."

==== 2025–2026 Iranian protests ====
The "Death to the Dictator" slogan among other anti-government slogans saw common usage from protesters like bazaar merchants who were discomforted by the high inflation rates and heavily devalued Iranian rial currency.

On 28 February 2026, Khamenei was assassinated in an airstrike.

== See also ==
- Death to Khamenei
- Death to America
- Death to Arabs
- Death to Israel
- Ash-shab yurid isqat an-nizam
