= Political slogans against the Islamic Republic of Iran =

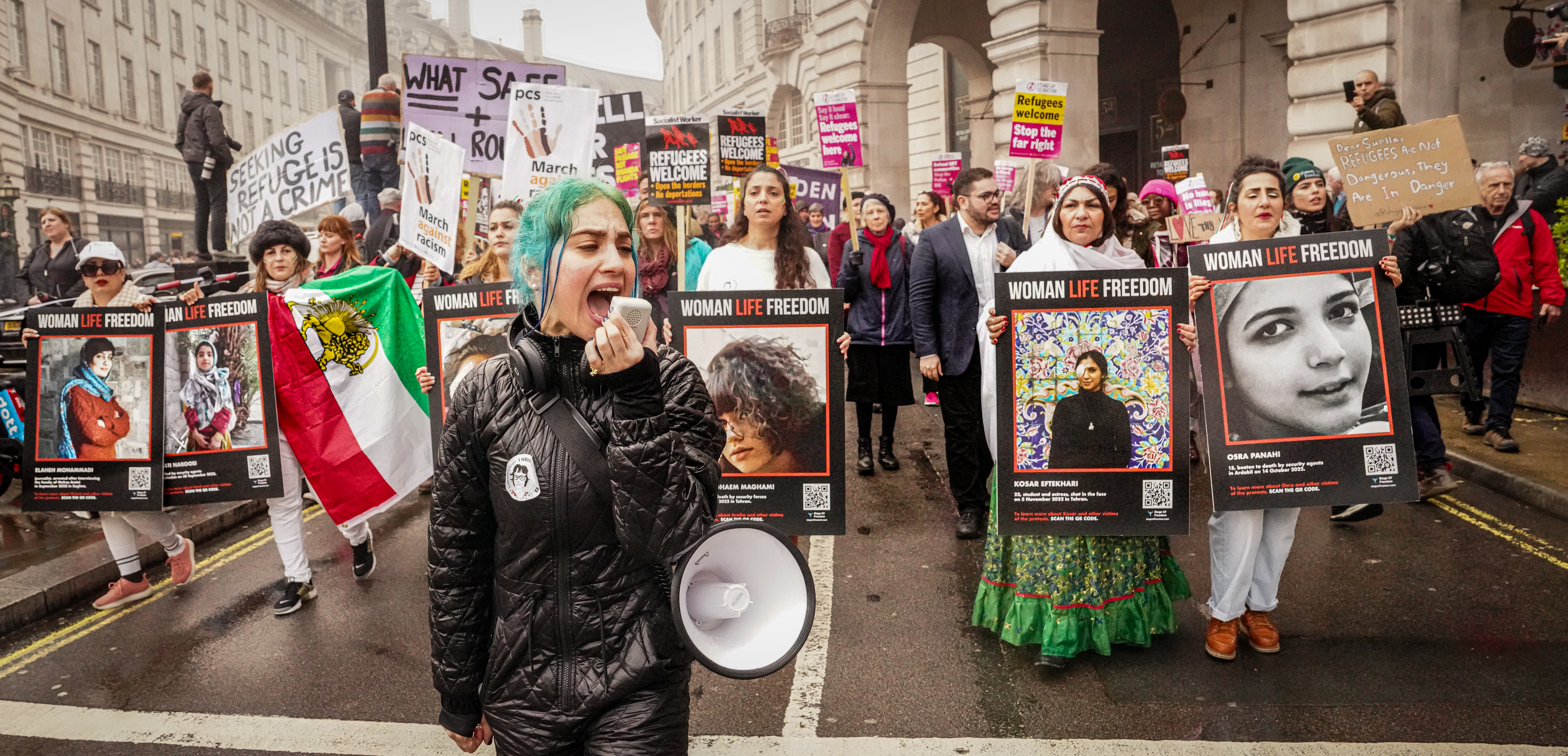
"Women, Life, Freedom", a popular slogan used during the Mahsa Amini protests

Political slogans against the Islamic Republic of Iran are used by the Iranian public to voice opposition to the Islamic Republic and its government. These slogans have developed over the years as a response to widespread discontent with the country's socio-political environment. Many Iranians say that the 1979 revolution, which overthrew the Pahlavi monarchy, initially promised democracy and freedom, but resulted in the establishment of a theocratic regime under the leadership of Ruhollah Khomeini. Over time, these political slogans have become a significant tool for expressing dissent, reflecting the aspirations of millions seeking freedom, justice, and systemic change in Iran.

== Background ==
The Islamic Revolution of 1979, which overthrew the Shah's monarchy, initially promised the creation of a more democratic and just society, with elements of freedom and social reform. Many groups, including secular forces, leftists, and intellectuals, participated in the revolution, hoping for political change, greater freedom, and an end to the oppressive monarchy. However, once the revolution succeeded and Ruhollah Khomeini and the clerics consolidated power, the promise of democracy was overtaken by the establishment of a theocratic regime.

Under Khomeini, the political structure shifted to a system based on Sharia law and the concept of "Velayat-e Faqih" (Guardianship of the Islamic Jurist) was introduced, giving absolute power to the clergy. The regime curtailed political freedoms, suppressed opposition, and imposed harsh policies that led to the exile, imprisonment, or execution of many of the revolution's former allies, including secular and left-wing groups.

By the early 1980s, many who had participated in the revolution began to feel betrayed by the regime's increasing repression. Political groups, students, and intellectuals advocating for democracy and civil rights began organizing protests.

== Aspects of opposition to the Islamic Republic ==
=== Human rights violation ===
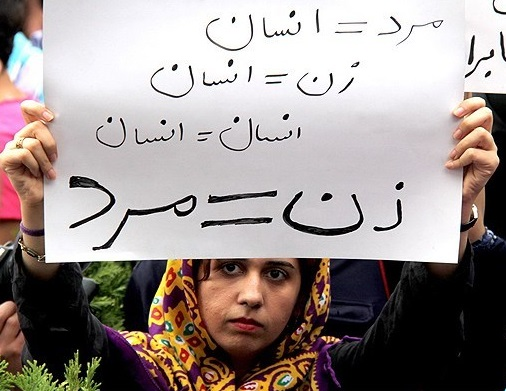
"Men=Human, Women=Human, Human=Human, Women=Men"

The Iranian government has faced widespread condemnation for its systematic suppression of fundamental freedoms, including speech, press, and assembly. Protesters, journalists, and activists who challenge the government often face severe repercussions, such as arbitrary detention, physical abuse, torture, and even execution. These measures aim to silence dissent and maintain strict control over the population, creating an atmosphere of fear and repression. Many slogans emphasize the need for freedom and justice, reflecting dissatisfaction with the regime's suppression of dissent and human rights abuses, for example an often-heard chant among university students: "Freedom, Freedom, Freedom" ("Azadi, Azadi, Azadi", "آزادی، آزادی، آزادی").

=== Women's rights ===
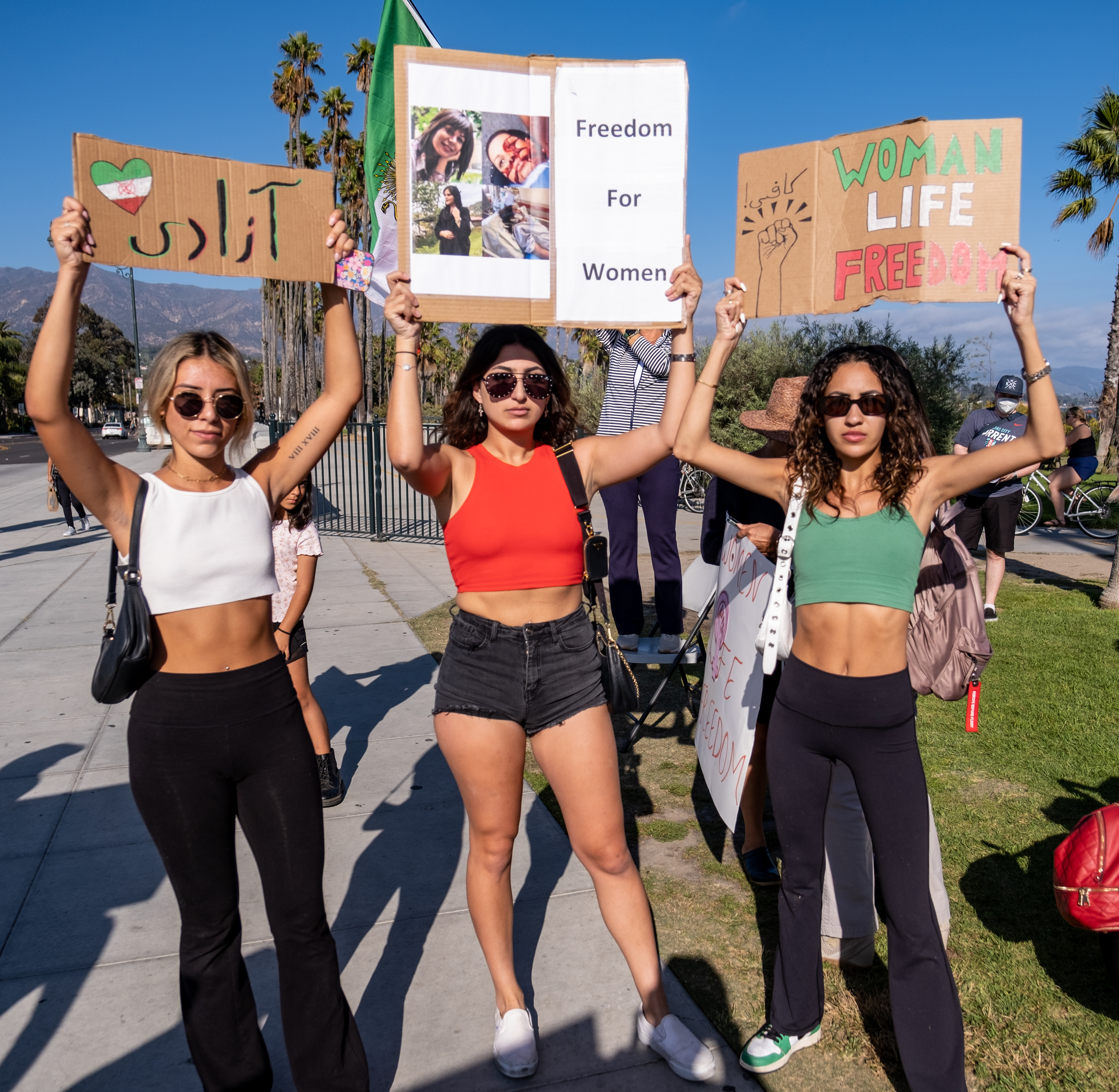
Signs from left to right: Azadi (freedom in English); Freedom For Women, with images of Neda Agha-Soltan and Mahsa Amini; Woman, Life, Freedom

The struggle for women's rights in Iran is deeply tied to the country's strict laws and policies that restrict personal freedoms. These laws, including the compulsory wearing of the hijab and restrictions on freedom of movement, education, and employment, contribute to a system of gender-based discrimination that severely limits women's autonomy. These gender-based restrictions have spurred significant public opposition, with many women taking bold steps to challenge the status quo. One of the most prominent slogans to emerge from the 2022 protests following the death of Mahsa Amini was "Women, Life, Freedom." ("Zan, Zandegi, Azadi", "زن، زندگی آزادی"). This phrase quickly became a rallying cry for people advocating for gender equality, the end of state-imposed dress codes, and greater personal freedoms for women.

=== Economic mismanagement ===
Economic hardship in Iran stems from a combination of government mismanagement, corruption, and international sanctions. Despite its wealth in natural resources, including vast reserves of oil and natural gas, the country faces high unemployment, inflation, and widespread poverty. Corruption within government institutions has worsened the situation, allowing wealth to concentrate among a privileged elite while much of the population struggles to meet basic needs. These internal challenges are further compounded by sanctions tied to Iran's nuclear program, which restrict global trade, limit foreign currency reserves, and drive up the cost of essential goods.

=== Investment in the Axis of Resistance ===
The Iranian government's intervention in regional conflicts and its creation of Axis of Resistance, have sparked significant opposition among the Iranian people. The Islamic Republic's regime invests billions of dollars in conflicts in neighboring countries such as Syria and Iraq, while also supporting organizations like Hezbollah in Lebanon, Hamas, the Palestinian Islamic Jihad, and Other related Palestinian Militant Groups in Gaza and the Houthis in Yemen. This enormous financial support undermines the Iranian economy, both because of the international sanctions imposed on Iran due to its backing of various militant groups, and because the funds that could benefit the Iranian people are instead diverted to wage wars that are unrelated to their interests. Among the slogans heard in the protests you can find this one: "Neither Gaza, nor Lebanon, I will sacrifice my life for Iran" (نه غزه، نه لبنان، جانم فدای ایران).

== List of slogans ==
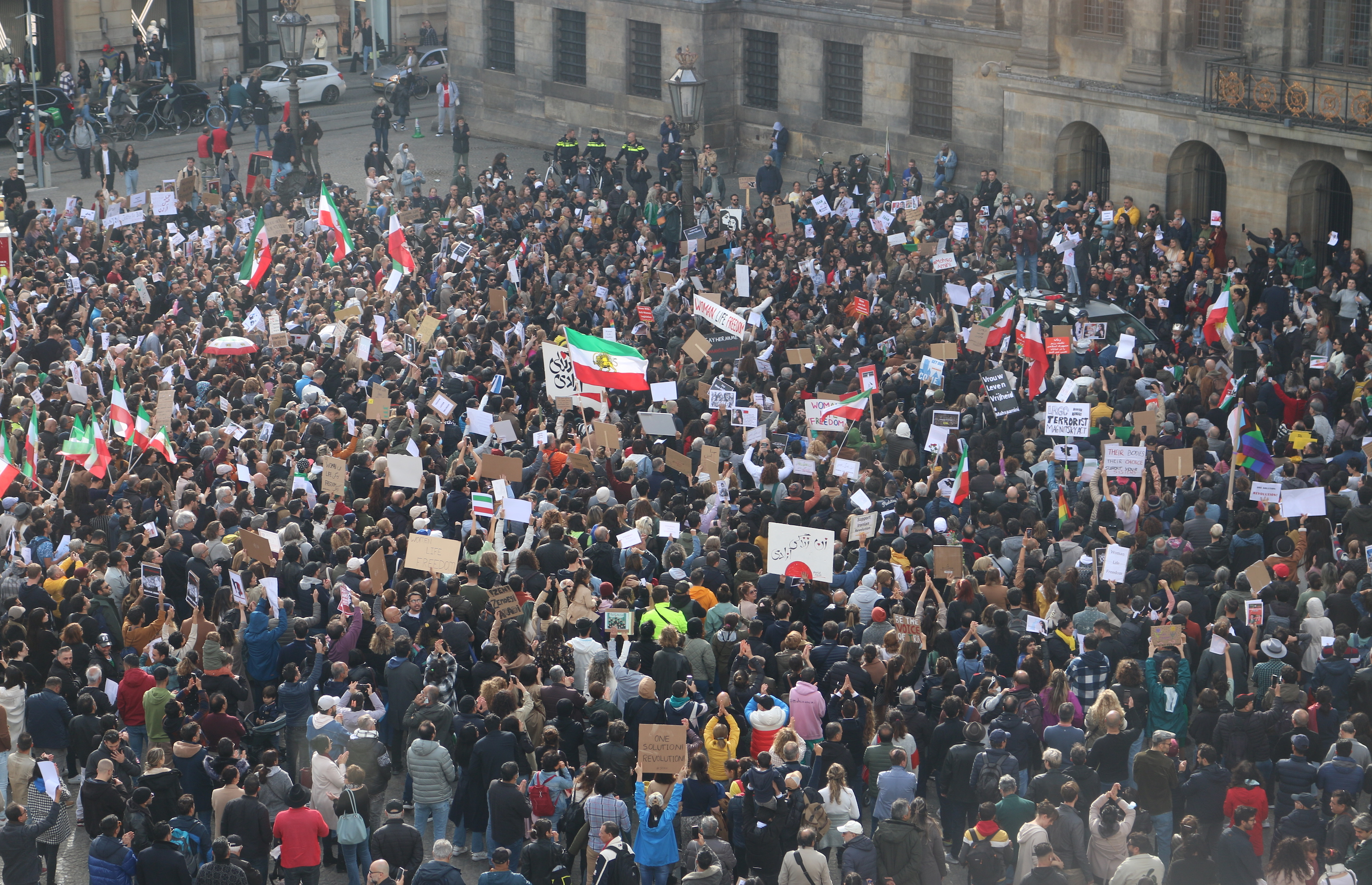
People's demonstrations against the Islamic Republic of Iran policies, Amsterdam, October 2022.

1. "This is the final battle, Pahlavi will return"- This chant was used primary during the 2025–2026 Iranian protests. This slogan says that the 2026 protests in Iran will be the last one until Supreme leader Khamenei is overthrown and that Crown Prince Reza will return to his home country.
2. Reza Shah, bless your soul ("Reza Shah, Roohet Shad" رضا شاه، روحت شاد): Reza Shah was the king of Iran from 1925 to 1941 who was known for his modernization efforts in Iran and fought against the clergy. This slogan honours the Shah, who notably banned the hijab in 1936, aiming to empower women. In addition, advanced support against child marriages, polygamy, exclusion from public society and education segregation.
3. Woman, Life, Freedom ("Zan, Zandegi, Azadi" زن، زندگی، آزادی): This slogan, which is also the name of a political movement, reflects the aspiration of Iranians for a future where women are respected, and all citizens can live free lives, emphasizing the connection between gender equality and overall societal freedom. The slogan emerged during the 2022 protests, following the death of Mahsa Amini. Mahsa Amini's death, after being detained by the morality police for allegedly violating Iran's strict dress code, sparked widespread outrage across the country. Thousands of Iranians, especially women and youth, took to the streets in protest, chanting "Women, Life, Freedom" as a call for justice and the abolition of oppressive laws. The slogan symbolizes not only the desire for gender equality but also a broader fight against a system that stifles individual rights and freedoms.
4. Neither Gaza, nor Lebanon, I will sacrifice my life for Iran ("nah ghazeh, nah lobnan, jaanam fada-ye Iran" نه غزه، نه لبنان، جانم فدای ایران): This slogan protests against the Iranian government's policy of investing large amounts of money and resources in Hezbollah in Lebanon and Hamas in Gaza. According to the protesters, the government's preference to invest in regional conflicts puts the Iranian people at risk and causes a severe economic crisis in the country. The slogan calls on the government to put domestic interests above regional considerations.
5. Death to the Dictator ("Marg Bar Dictator" مرگ بر دیکتاتور): this slogan specifically targets Ayatollah Ali Khamenei, who has held the position of Supreme Leader since 1989, and symbolizes the demand for his removal.
6. We are all Mahsa, We Are All in This Fight Together ("Ma Hameh Mahsa Hastim, Bejang ta Bejangim" ما همه مهسا هستیم، بجنگ تا بجنگیم): this slogan honors Mahsa Amini, whose death in custody became a symbol of the struggle for women's rights and justice in Iran.
7. Our Disgrace is Our Incompetent Basij ("Nangeh Ma, Basij-e Aldang-e Ma" ننگ ما ننگ ما بسیج الدنگ ما): This slogan refers to members of the Basij, a paramilitary group within the Islamic Revolutionary Guard Corps, which has been responsible for suppressing protests in Iran.
8. We don't want a baby-killing government, we don't want it ("hokumat-e bacheh kosh nemikhayim, nemikhayim" حکومت بچه‌کش، نمی‌خوایم، نمی‌خوایم): This slogan protests against the violence of the police, carried out under the regime's orders, against Iranian demonstrators. The slogan was written and disseminated after dozens of children were killed by police during the Mahsa Amini protests.
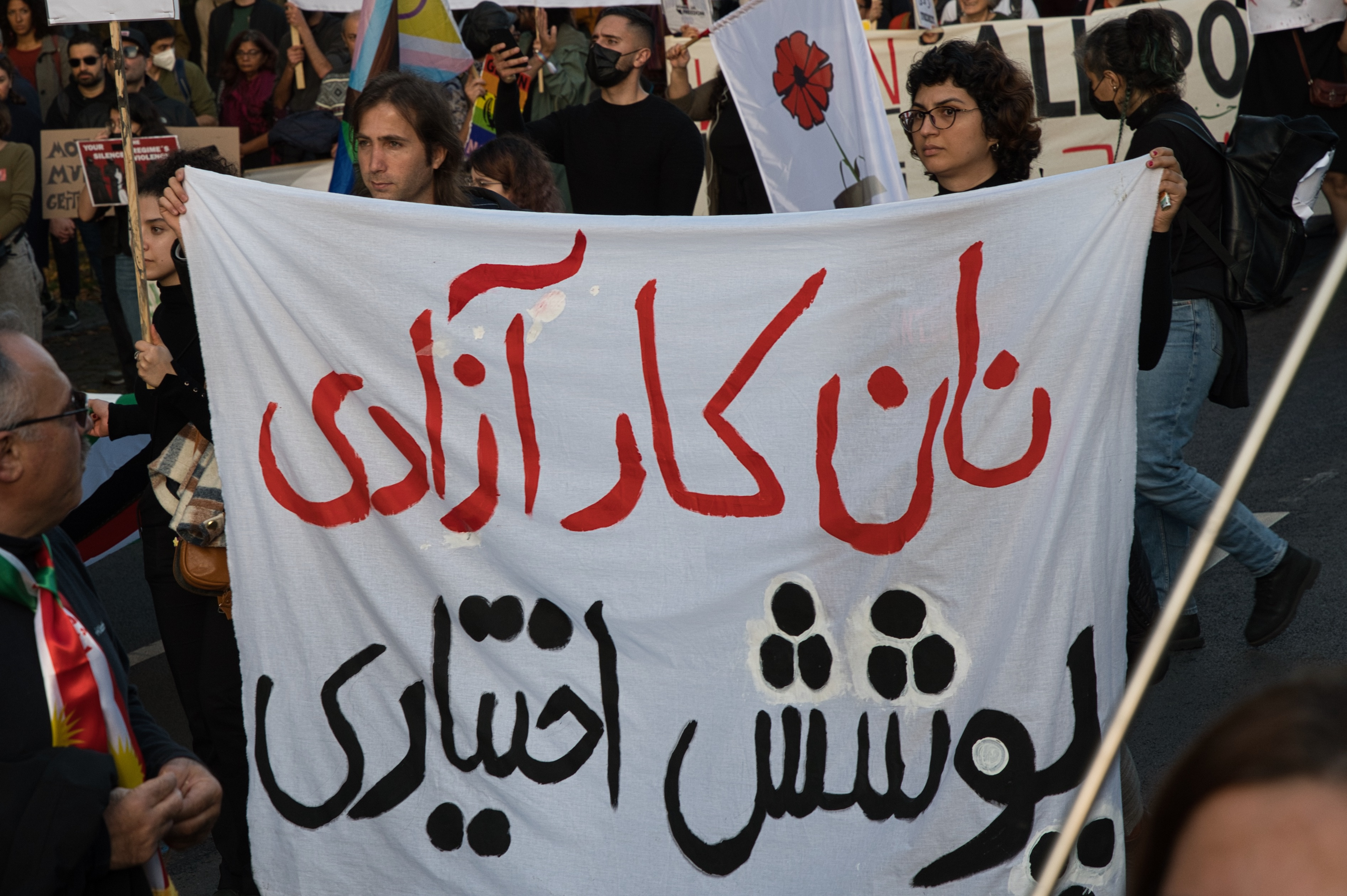
9. "Bread, Work, Freedom, Optional Hijab"
  Independence, Freedom, Optional Hijab ("Esteghlal, Azadi, Hejab Ekhtiari" استقلال، آزادی، حجاب اختیاری): This slogan expresses the desire for personal autonomy, where women can decide whether or not to wear the hijab without state-imposed mandates.
10. Mojtaba, We'll See You Die Before Becoming a Leader ("Mojtaba, Bemiri, Rahbari ro Nabini" مجتبی بمیری، رهبری رو نبینی): In Iran, many believed that Supreme Leader Ayatollah Ali Khamenei was grooming his second son, Mojtaba, to succeed him, even though the position is not hereditary. Following the Assassination of Ali Khamenei in 2026, Mojtaba was elected as the third Supreme Leader of Iran.
11. Undignified Basiji, You are Our ISIS ("Basiji-ye Bi-Gheirat, Daesh-e Ma Shomaei" بسیجی بی غیرت، داعش ما شمایی): Although the Iranian rulers are fighting against the Sunni Muslim ISIS in Iraq and Syria, the Iranian civilians compare the Islamic republic of Iran to ISIS due to the regime's harsh suppression of women's rights and restrictions on social freedoms.
12. Our dollars are in Lebanon, our soul is in prison ("Dolaramun to Lobnan, Javunamun to zendan" دلارامون تو لبنان، جوونامون تو زندان): By using this slogan, Iranian civilians condemn the Iranian regime for prioritizing economic support for regional allies, such as Hezbollah in Lebanon, over meeting the essential needs of its own people. According to them, not only does the Iranian government waste citizens' money on foreign conflicts that do not concern them, but it also harshens its treatment of its own citizens, and brutally suppresses those protesting against the regime.
13. Disgraceful, Disgraceful, Disgraceful ("Bi-Sharaf, Bi-Sharaf, Bi-Sharaf" بی شرف، بی شرف، بی‌شرف): The word sharaf carries deep meaning in Persian culture, encompassing concepts such as honor, dignity, grace, and loyalty. Bi-sharaf—without honor—is a slogan directed at individuals or groups who are seen as complicit in oppression or corruption, accusing them of acting without integrity, morals or values or regard for justice. It is a stark moral indictment, emphasizing the collective shame and outrage felt by the people toward those who perpetuate systemic injustice and repression.
14. Until the Mullah is shrouded, this homeland will not be a homeland ("ta akhond kafan nashavad, in vatan vatan nashavad" تا آخوند کفن نشود، این وطن وطن نشود): This slogan is directed against the fundamentalist religious regime in Iran, represented by the mullahs. The protesters argue that as long as the religious government remains in power, the Iranian people cannot call Iran their homeland. This slogan was recorded during the protests and was later transformed into a song by the Iranian musician Shahin Najafi.
15. Freedom, Freedom, Freedom ("Azadi, Azadi, Azadi" آزادی، آزادی، آزادی): This slogan represents the Iranian people's desire for liberation and systemic change. In a nation governed by a restrictive theocracy, the call for freedom reflects a yearning for individual rights, democratic participation, and the ability to live as independent and empowered citizens. This chant represents a collective demand to break free from authoritarian rule and build a society rooted in justice and autonomy.
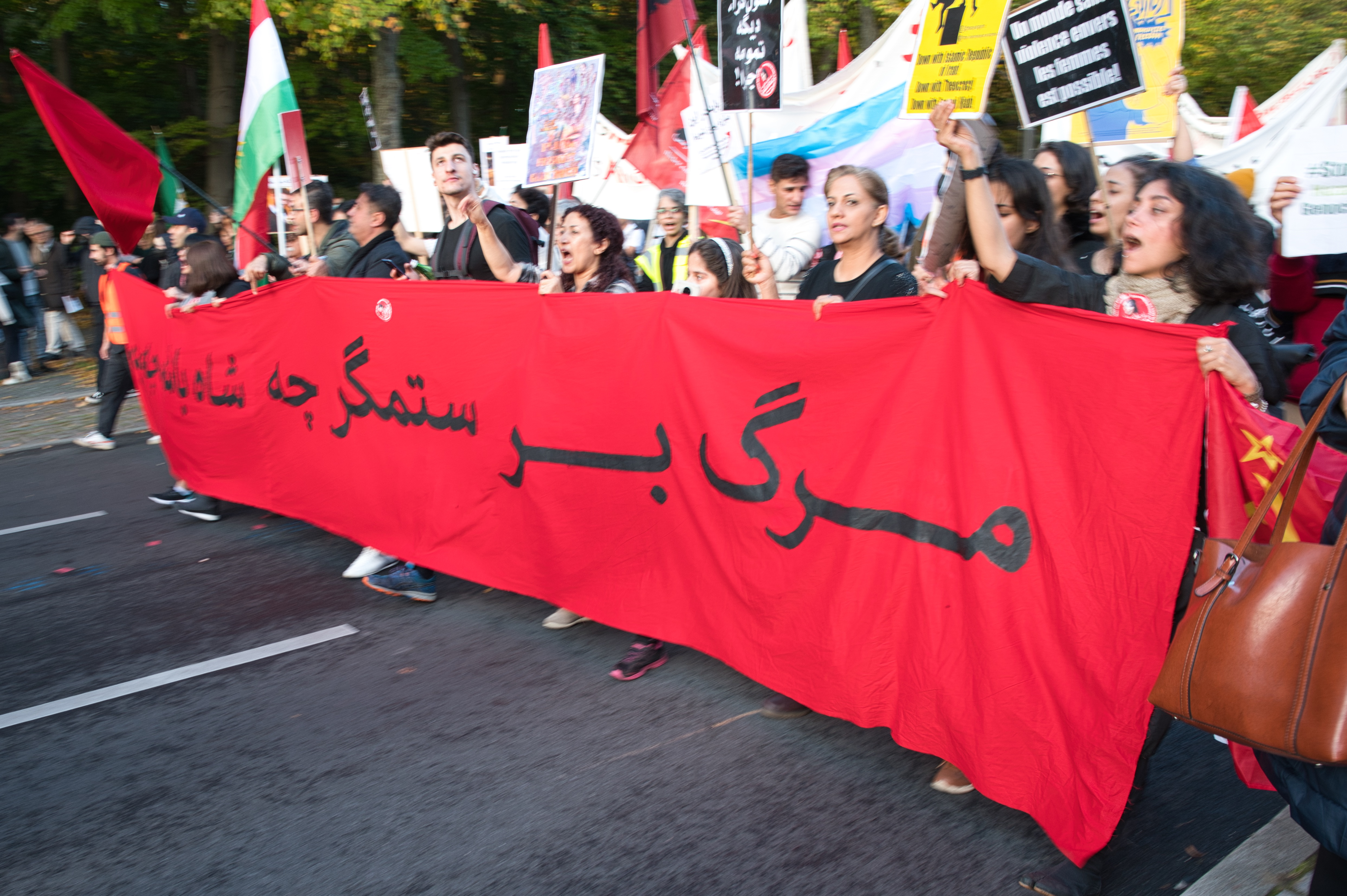
16. "Death to the Dictator, Be it Shah or Ayatollah"
  Death to the Dictator, Be it Shah or Ayatollah ("Marg Bar Setamgar, Che Shah Bashe Che Rahbar" مرگ بر ستمگر، چه شاه باشه چه رهبر): The slogan, tracing back to the 1905 Constitutional Revolution, is a declaration of discontent with all forms of dictatorship, emphasizing that the identity of the ruler—whether a secular king or a religious leader—is irrelevant if they fail to uphold the rights and dignity of the people. It underscores the collective demand for a government that represents the will of the populace and adheres to principles of democracy and human rights.
17. Our Disgrace is Our Incompetent Leader ("Nang-e Ma, Rahbar-e Aldang-e Ma" ننگ ما، ننگ ما، رهبر الدنگ ما): This slogan describes their leaders as inept, corrupt, lazy, and freeloaders.
18. Our enemy is right here, they lie saying it's America ( "doshman ma haminjast, doroogh migan Amrikast" دشمن ما همینجاست، دروغ میگن آمریکاست): According to the protesters, the Iranian regime is lying when it claims that the United States is Iran's enemy; the true enemy is the regime itself, which harms the Iranian people.
19. I Will Kill, I Will Kill, Those Who Killed My Sister ("Mikosham, Mikosham, Har An Keh Khaharam Kosht" می‌کشم، می‌کشم، هر آنکه خواهرم کشت): This slogan shows the solidarity between Iranian men and women in their struggle for civil rights.
20. Death to Khamenei ("Marg Bar Khamenei" مرگ بر خامنه‌ای): One of the most common slogans heard during recent protests, representing the widespread desire to end Khamenei's rule.
21. We Don't Want the Islamic Republic ("Jomhouri Eslami, Ne Mikhahim, Ne Mikhahim" جمهوری اسلامی، نمی‌خواهیم، نمی‌خواهیم): This slogan expresses the disillusionment of authoritarian rule and a rejection of the theocratic system that began in 1979. After more than four decades of autocratic rule and obsolete ideology, many Iranians have had enough. This slogan epitomizes their total disenchantment with the system.
22. Iranians Die but Will Not Be Suppressed ("Irani Mimirad, Zelat Nemipazirad" ایرانی می‌میرد، ذلت نمی‌پذیرد): stands against the regime's use of violence to suppress dissent, emphasizing that Iranians would rather die than live under oppression.
23. Make Iran Great Again - A slogan used by U.S. President Donald Trump that describes the Islamic regime as deteriorating and suggests it should be replaced in order to make Iran a greater country. It was also used by the Iranian opposition group RESTART.
24. "Without honour! Without honour!"- chanted by female university protests against security forces who came to break up the protest.
25. "This year will be the year of blood, Ali [Khamenei] will be overthrown!"- Chants threatening Iran's supreme leader on 1 January 2026.

== International impact ==
Iranian protest slogans, especially "Women, Life, Freedom", have transcended Iran's borders, becoming universal symbols of resistance against oppression. This slogan gained global prominence during the 2022–2023 Mahsa Amini protests, encapsulating calls for gender equality, justice, and human dignity. Its simplicity and universality has inspired demonstrations in cities worldwide, including Berlin, Toronto, and Los Angeles. These words have been adopted by feminist organizations and human rights movements globally, integrating Iran's struggle into broader campaigns advocating for women's rights and freedom.

Diaspora communities have played a pivotal role in amplifying these slogans on the international stage. Iranian expatriates and activists, such as Masih Alinejad, have used social media and public demonstrations to ensure the global community remains aware of Iran's human rights crisis. Protests organized by these communities have translated the slogans into local languages, making them accessible to diverse audiences and turning them into rallying cries for justice. This activism has pressured governments and international organizations to impose sanctions, investigate human rights violations, and adopt stronger stances against the Iranian regime despite geopolitical challenges.

Beyond protests, these slogans have inspired art, music, and literature, ensuring the movement's ethos reaches global audiences.

== See also ==
- Woman, Life, Freedom movement
- Political slogans of the Islamic Republic of Iran
- List of political slogans
- Human rights in the Islamic Republic of Iran
