= Dasht-e Barm Forest =

- IUCN category V (protected landscape/seascape)
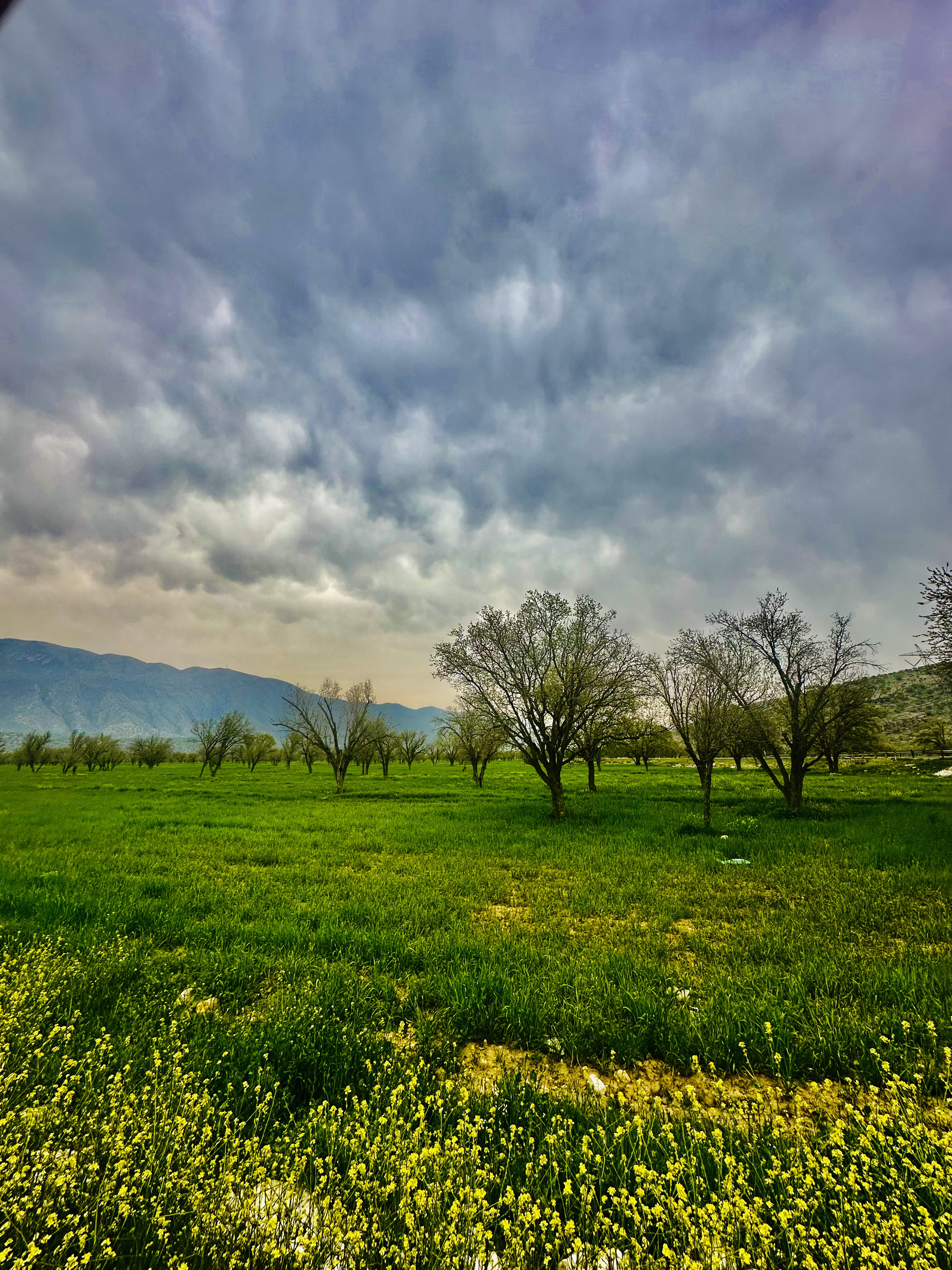
- The Dasht-e Barm Forest in Kazerun County

- Location within Iran
- Location: Kazerun County, Fars Province, Iran
- Nearest city: Kazerun
- Coordinates: 29.555397°N 51.887943°E
- Area: 260 km^{2} (100 sq mi)
- Elevation: 1,500–2,400 m (4,900–7,900 ft)
- Designation: Protected area / Biosphere reserve
- Governing body: Department of Environment of Iran

Dasht-e Barm Forest (Persian: جنگل دشت برم), also known as Mian Kotal Recreation Area, is the largest oak forest in Iran and the Middle East. It is located in the central district of Kazerun County, southwestern Iran. The forest is part of the Arjan and Parishan Protected Area, listed by UNESCO as a Biosphere Reserve.

The Mian Kotal protected zone, which forms part of this forest, is the main habitat of the Persian fallow deer (Dama mesopotamica) and several other rare species. Within the forest also lies the Mian Kotal Caravanserai, the only completely stone-built Caravanserai in Iran.

== Geography ==
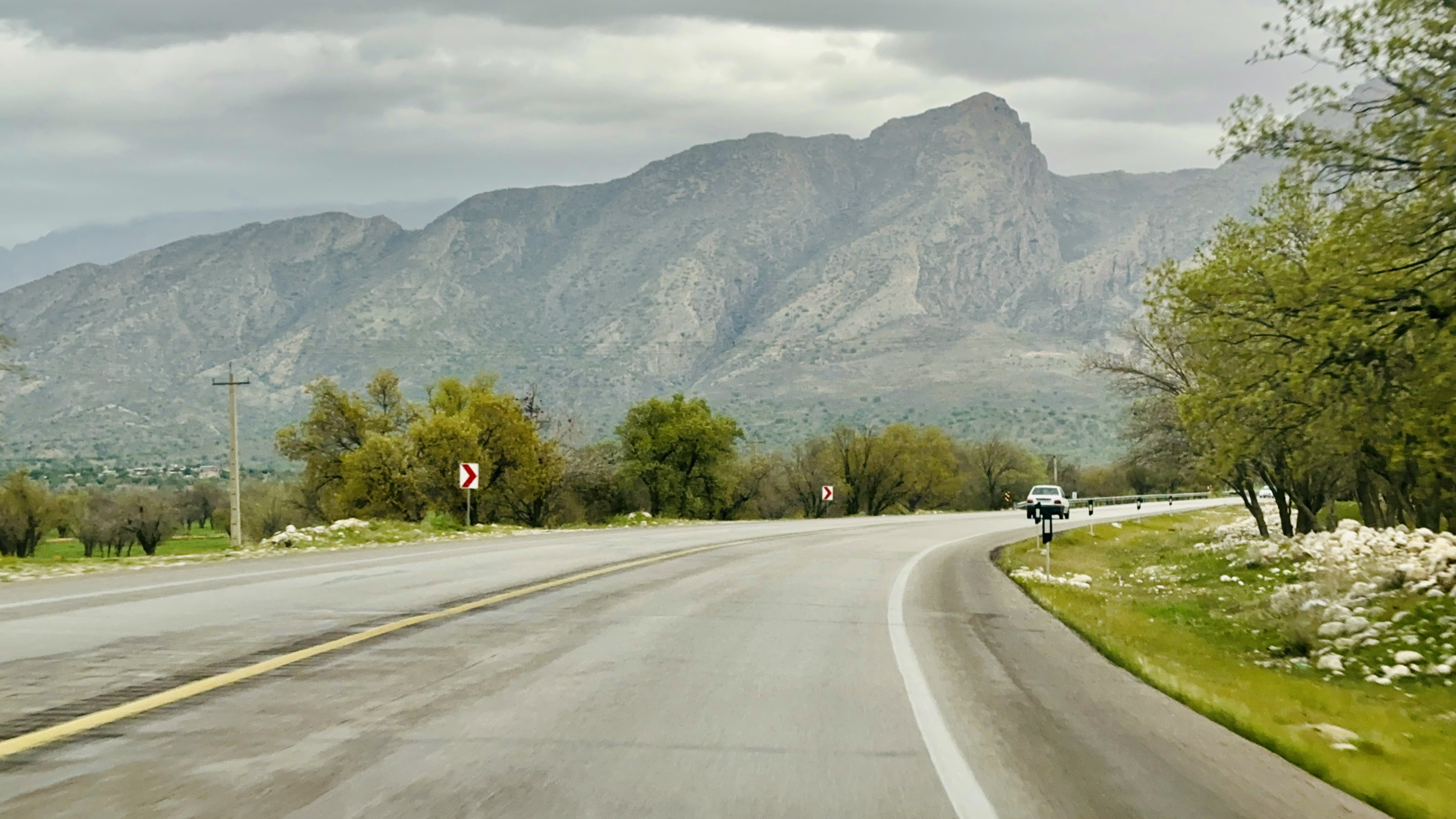
The new Kazerun–Shiraz road, which passes through the Dasht-e Barm Forest.

The Dasht-e Barm Forest lies on the southernmost slopes of the Zagros Mountains in southwestern Iran, about 20 km east of Kazerun. Approximately 35 km of the Kazerun–Shiraz highway passes through this forest, making it one of Iran’s most scenic routes.

== Area and elevation ==
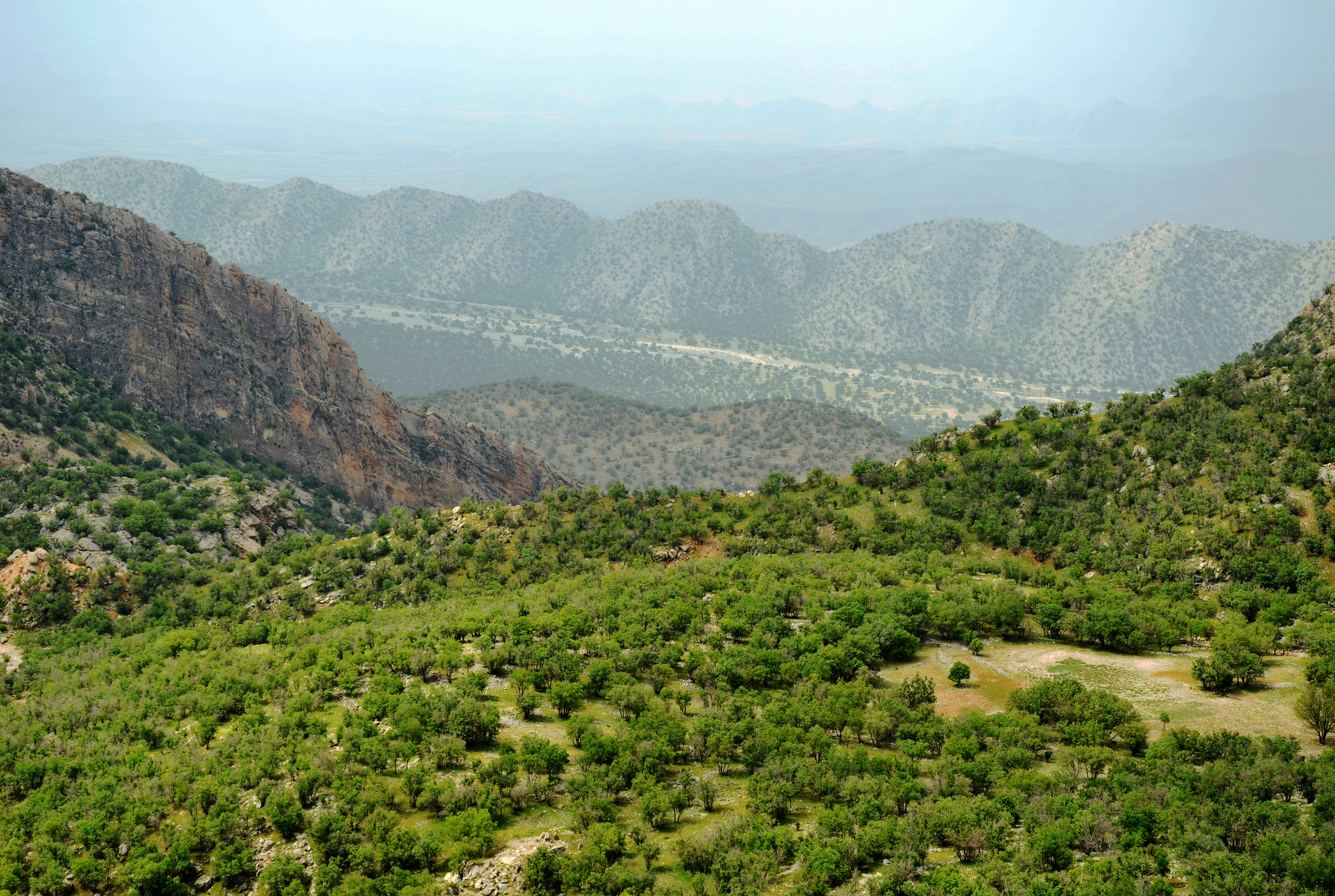
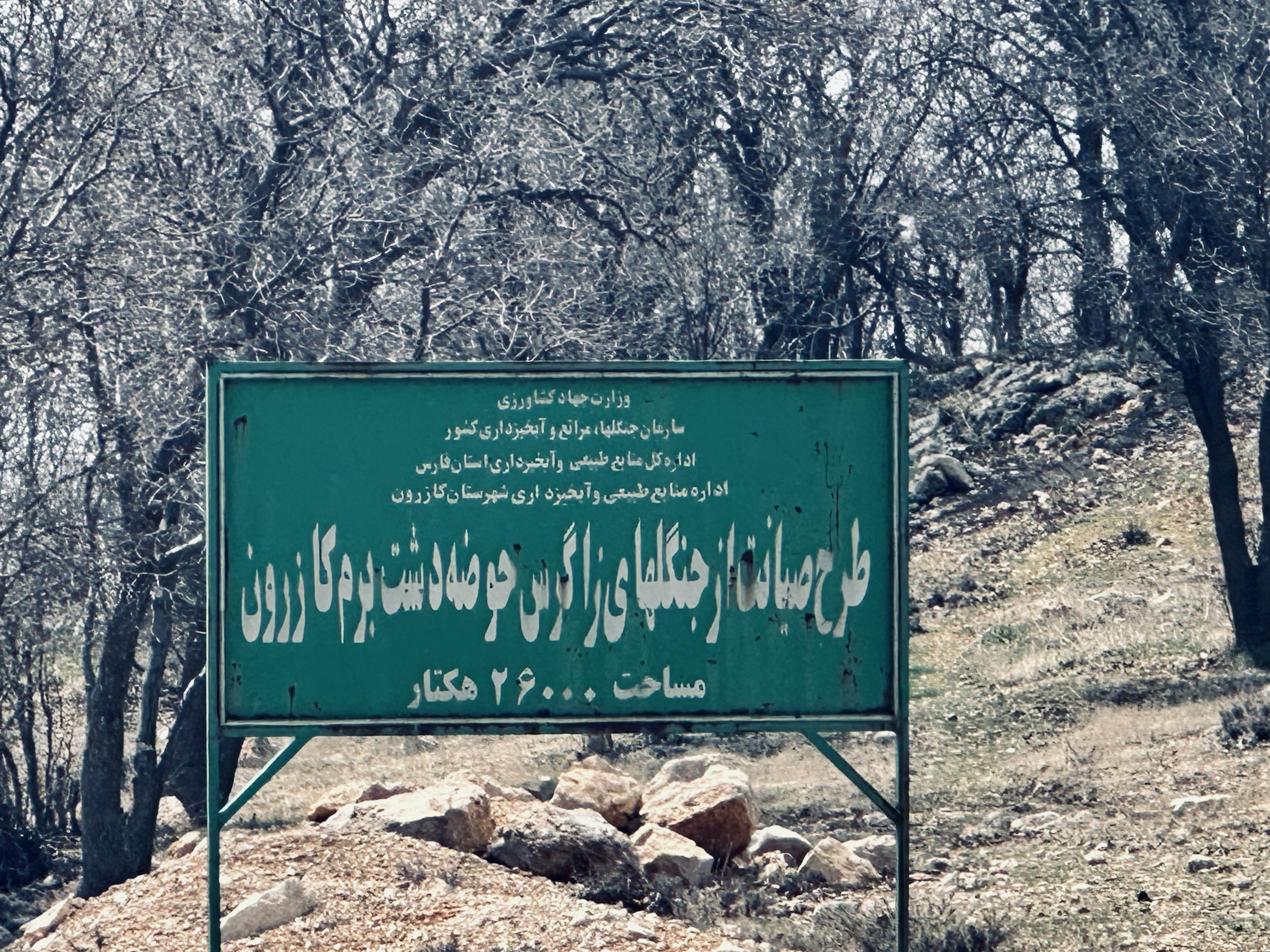

Covering about 26,000 hectares, Dasht-e Barm is the largest oak forest in Iran and the Middle East. Its elevation ranges between 1,500 and 2,400 meters above sea level.

== Flora ==
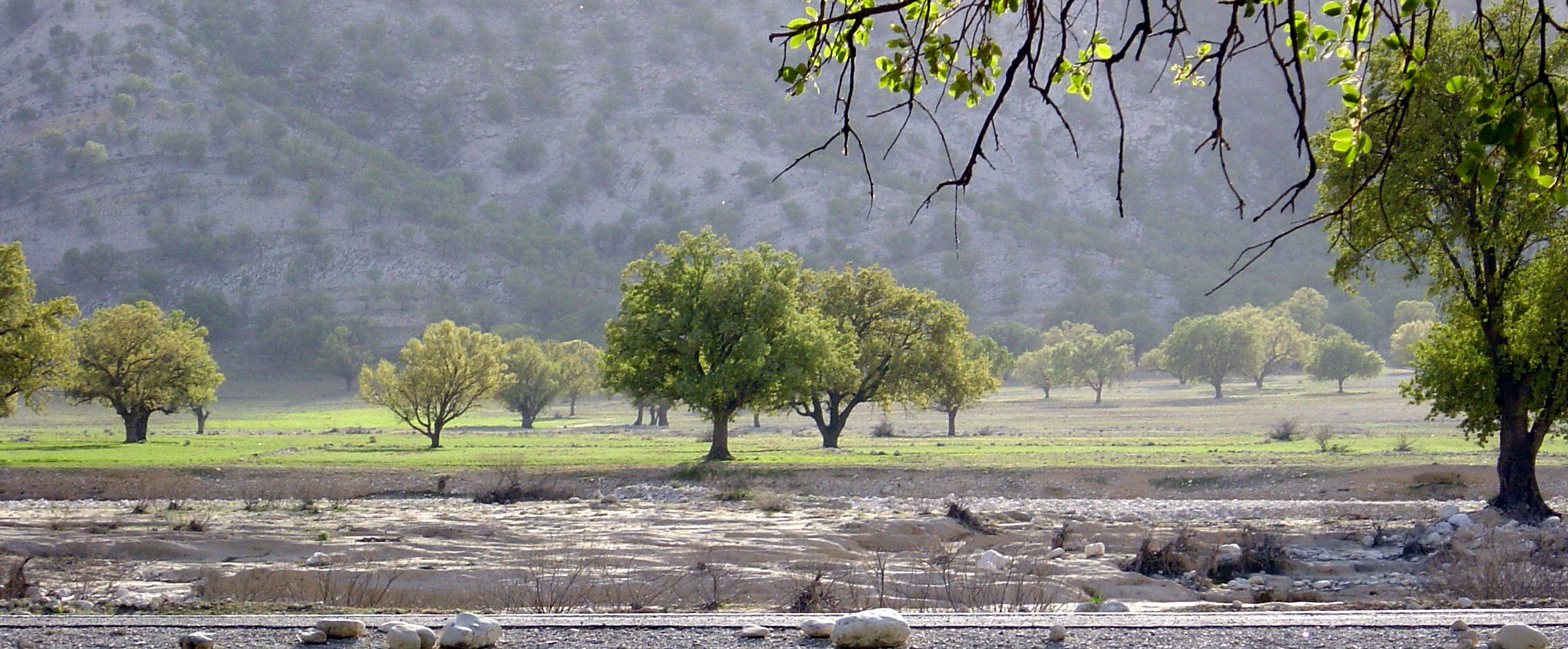
Dasht-e Barm in 2003

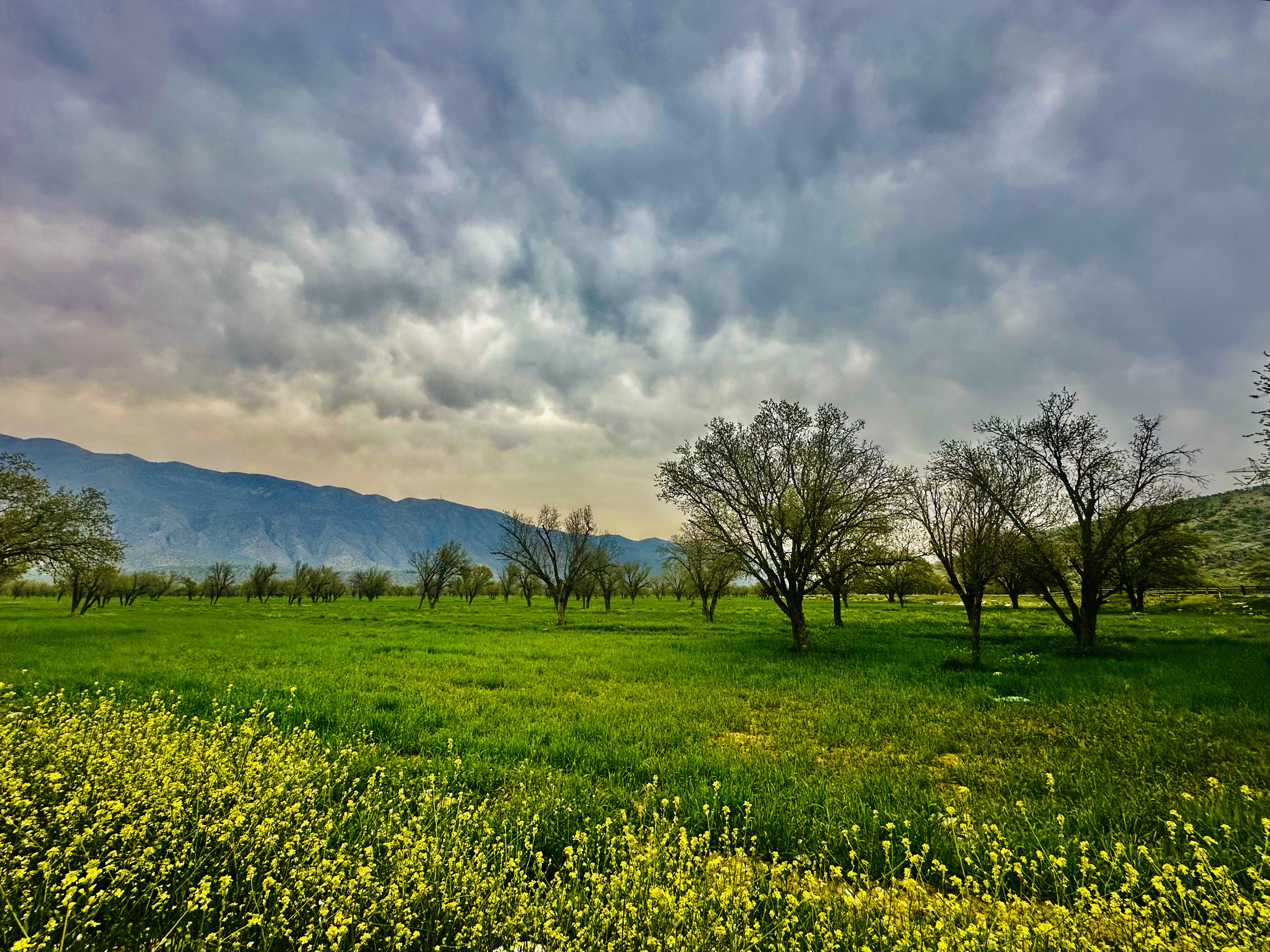
Dasht-e Barm in 2025

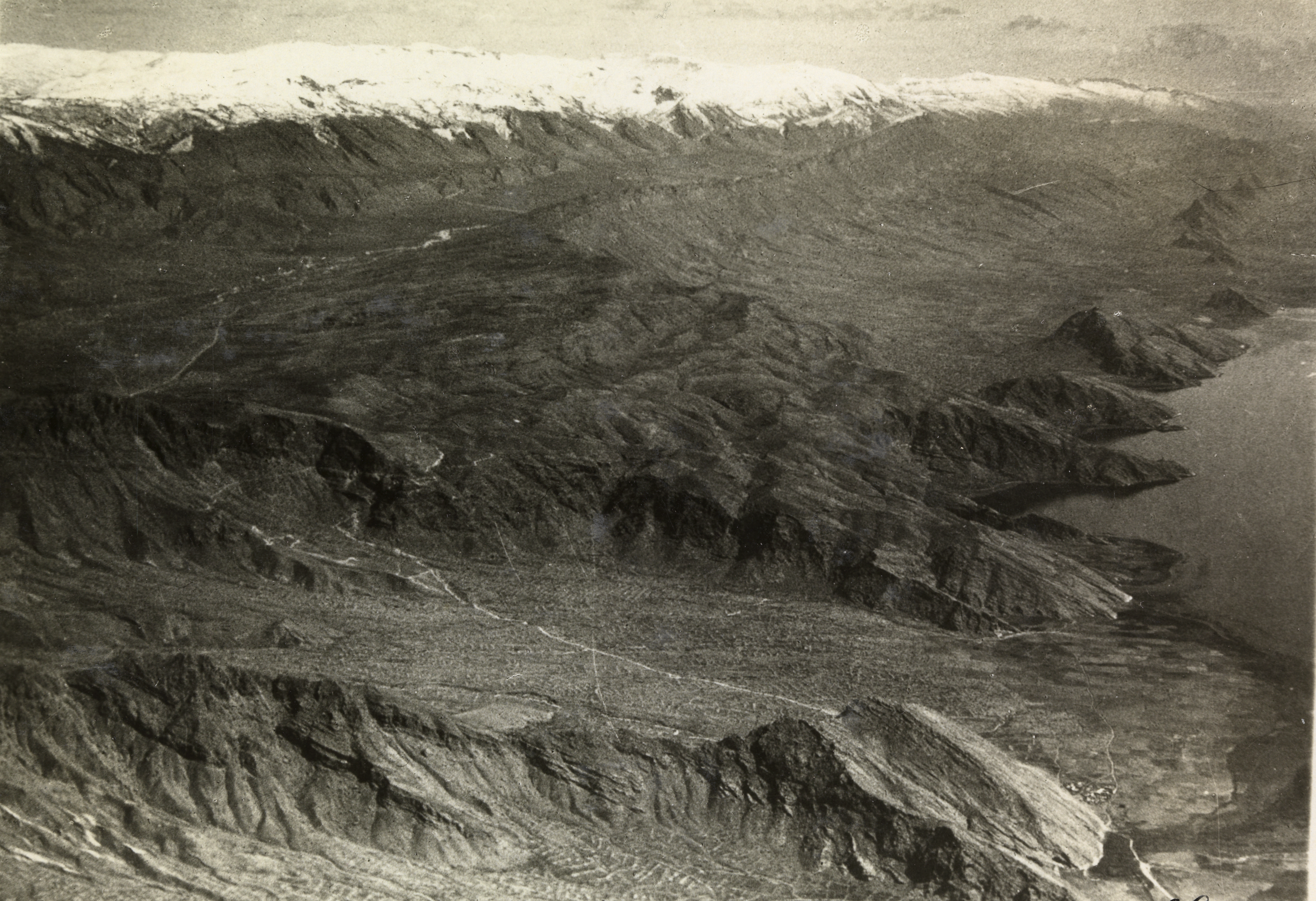
A historical photograph of Dasht-e Barm and Parishan Lake in Kazerun, dating back to 1925.

The forest has a rich vegetation cover dominated by oak (Quercus brantii), along with species such as wild almond, hawthorn, Persian maple, wild fig, blackberry, kikem, and wild pear. It plays a significant ecological role in moderating the southern climate and is recognized as a protected area and biosphere reserve.

During late winter and spring, the area is covered with poppies and narcissus flowers, and its snowy winters make it a popular tourist attraction and picnic destination.

Its high biodiversity has attracted botanical studies and plant sampling by both Iranian and international researchers.

== Fauna ==
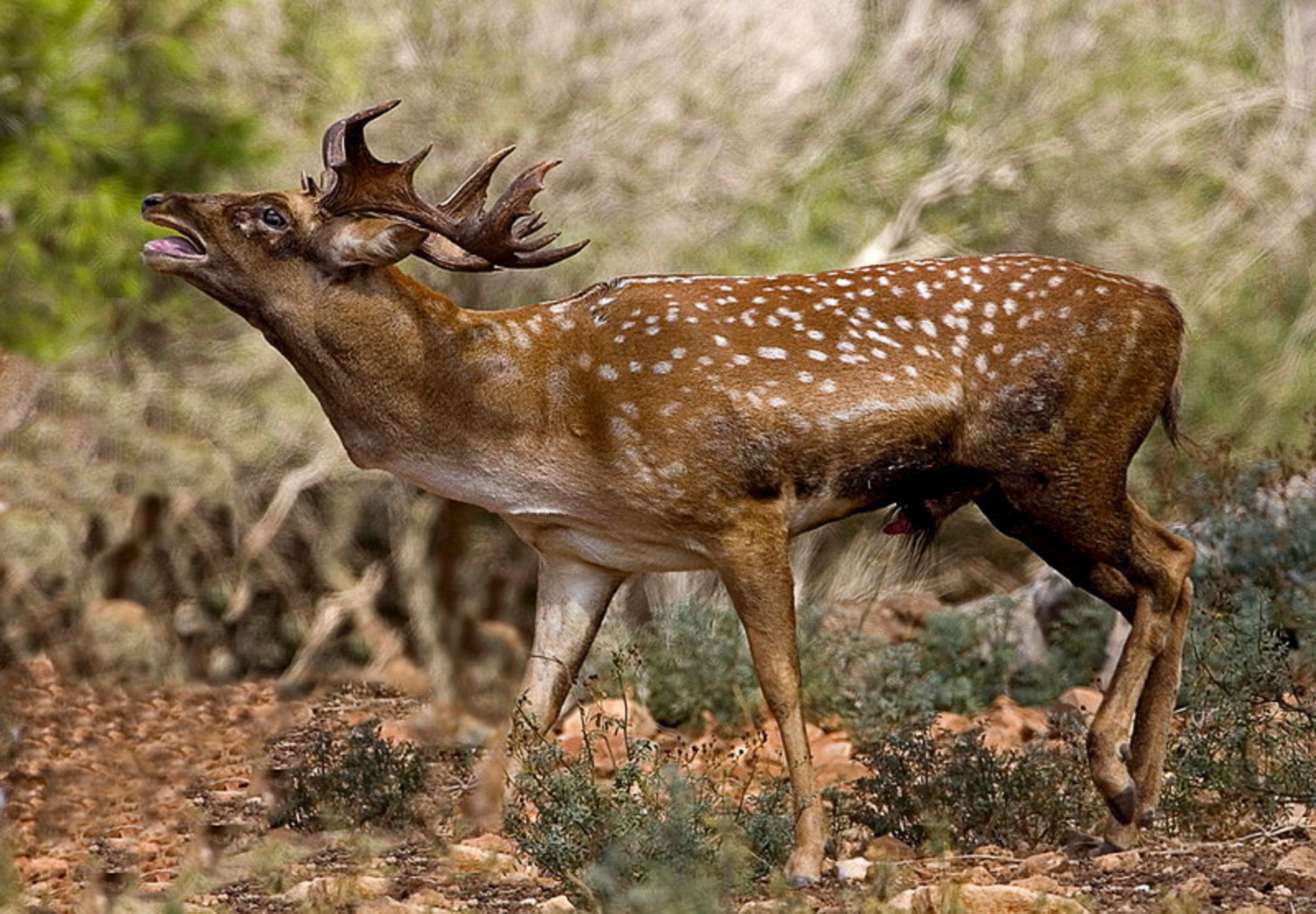
Persian fallow deer

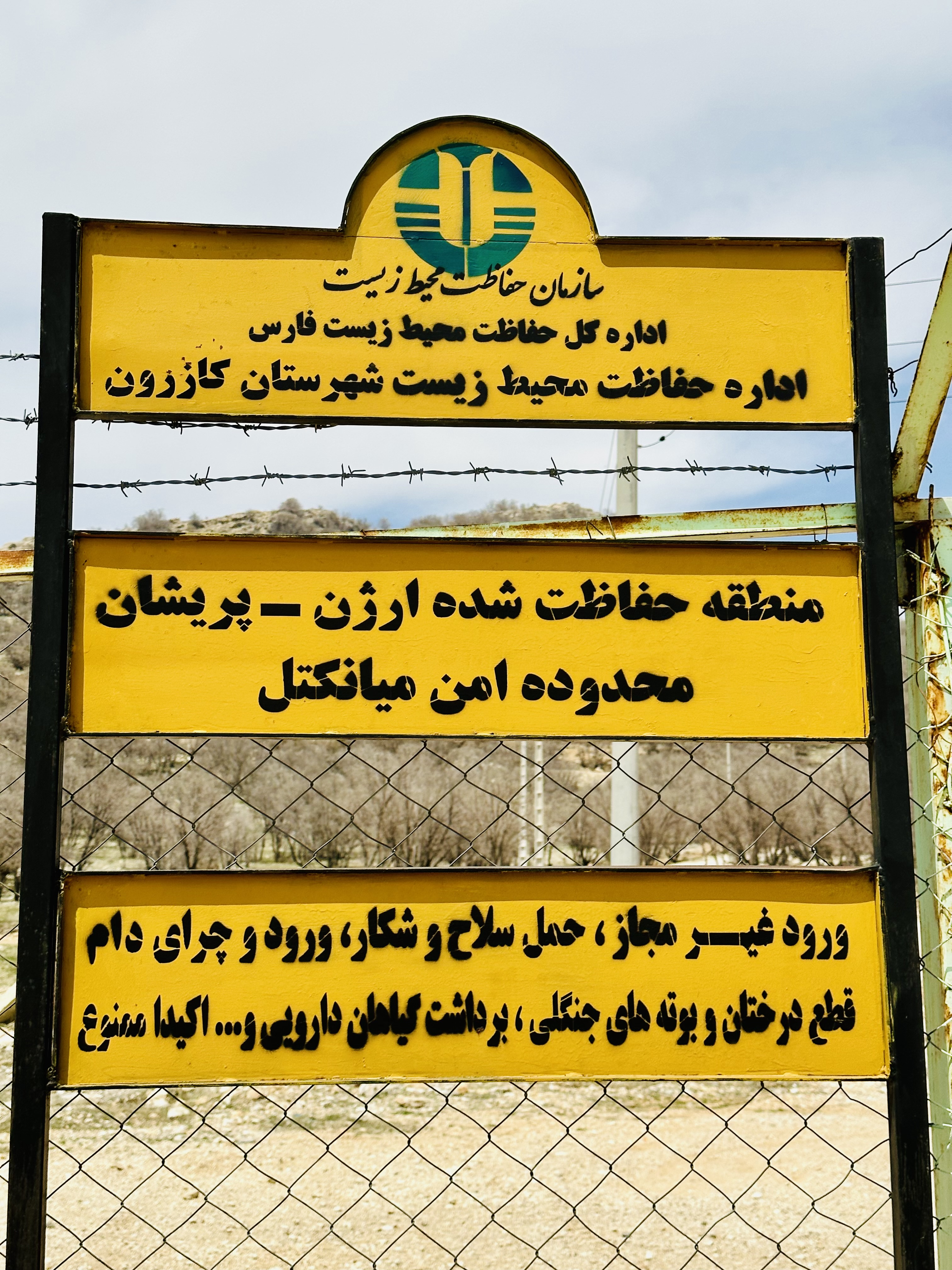

The Mian Kotal protected area within the forest is the main habitat of the Persian fallow deer (Dama mesopotamica). Other wildlife species include gazelle, mouflon, leopard, brown bear, partridge, wild boar, ibex, goat, wolf, hyena, red fox, jackal, and squirrels. Birds of prey such as eagle, falcon, hawk, vulture, owl, and eagle-owl are also common, while flamingo, pheasant, and nightingale are found in abundance. Historically, the forest was also home to the Asiatic lion (Panthera leo persica).

== Mian Kotal Caravanserai ==
The Mian Kotal Caravanserai, located within Dasht-e Barm, is the only fully stone-built Caravanserai in Iran. It was constructed by order of Shah Abbas I of the Safavid dynasty and is therefore also known as the Shah Abbasi Caravanserai. It is currently being restored and converted into a boutique hotel.

== Paragliding site ==
The Mian Kotal paragliding site in Dasht-e Barm hosts recreational flights and national paragliding competitions.

== Gallery ==
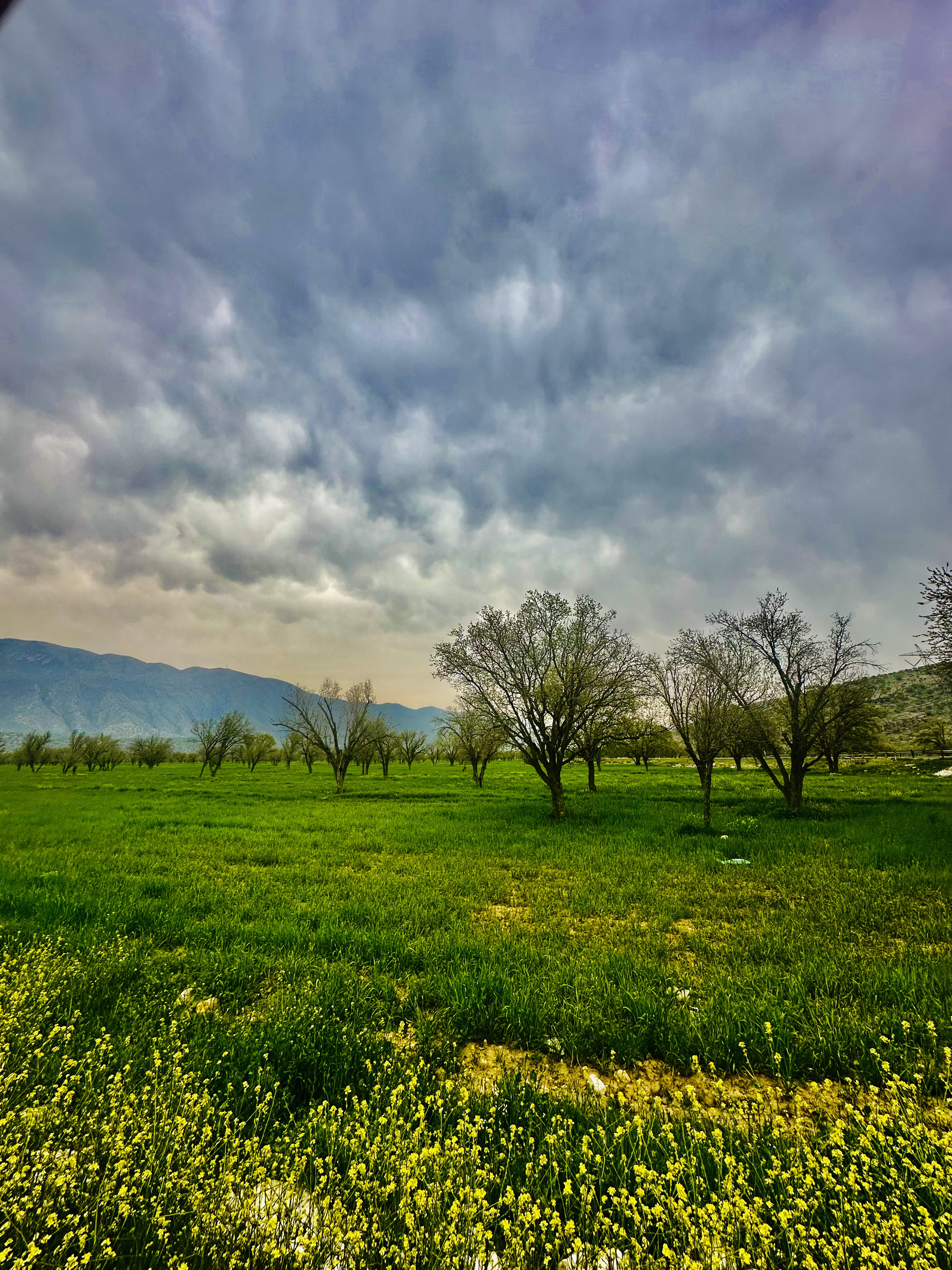

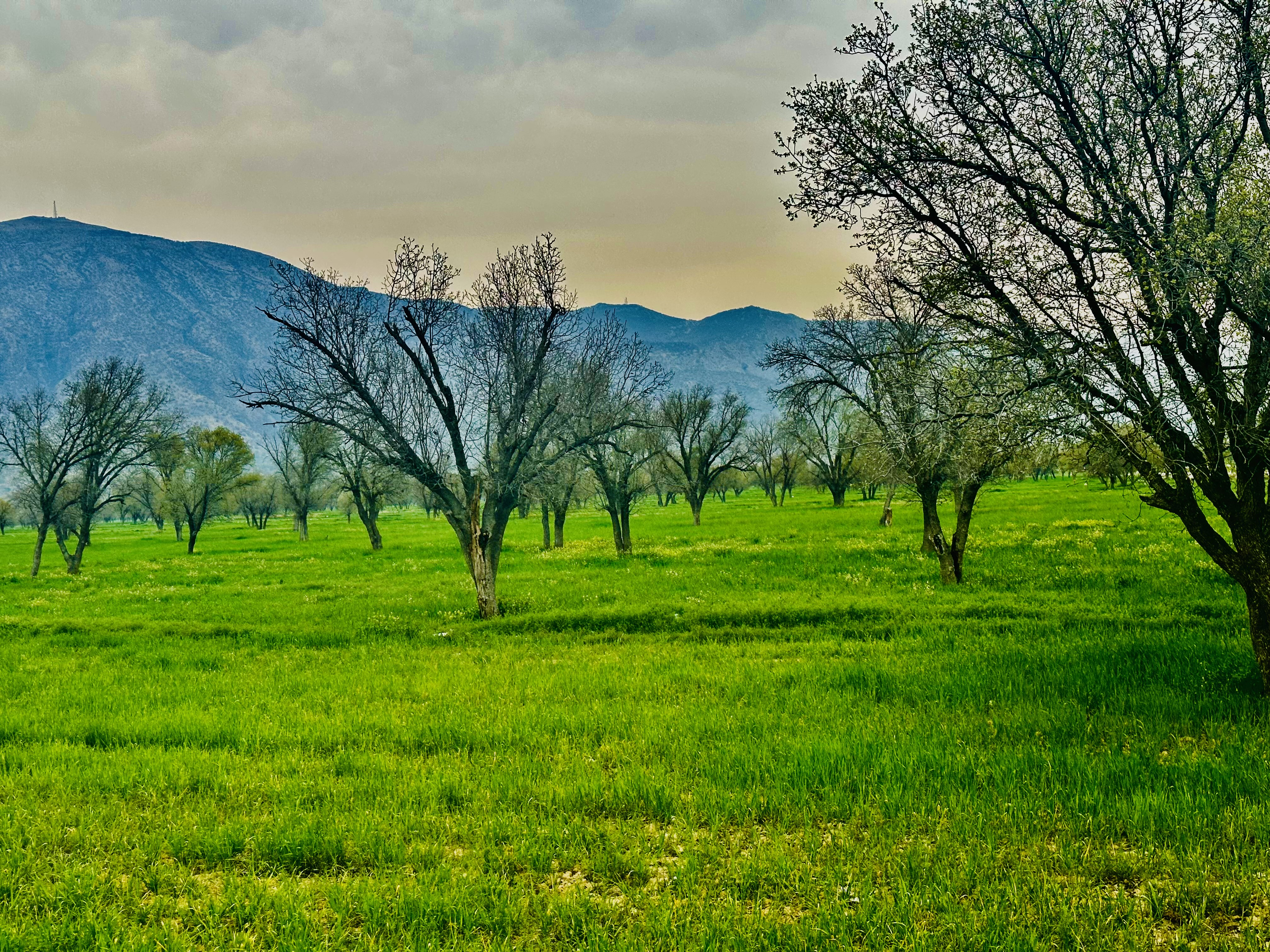

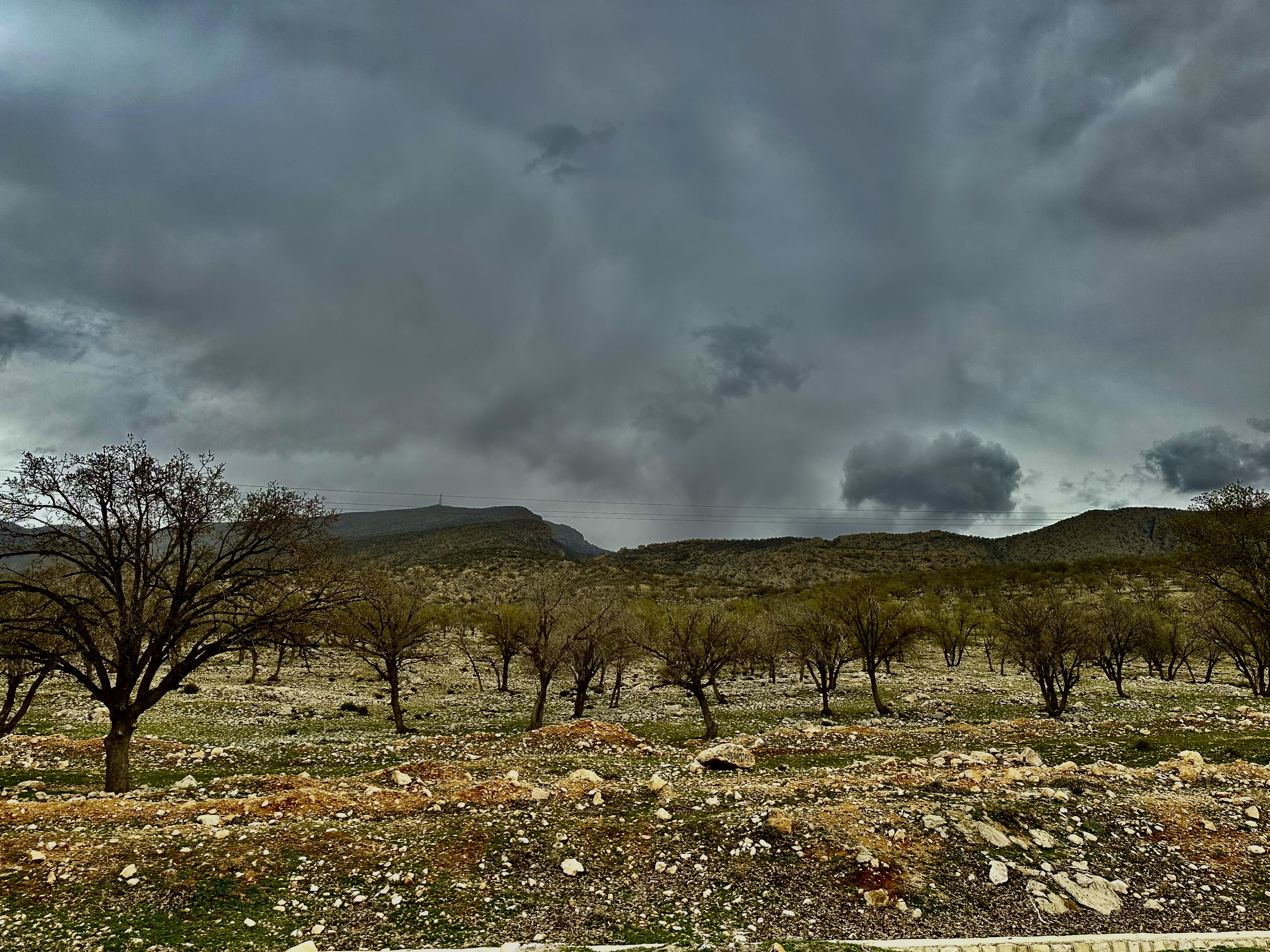

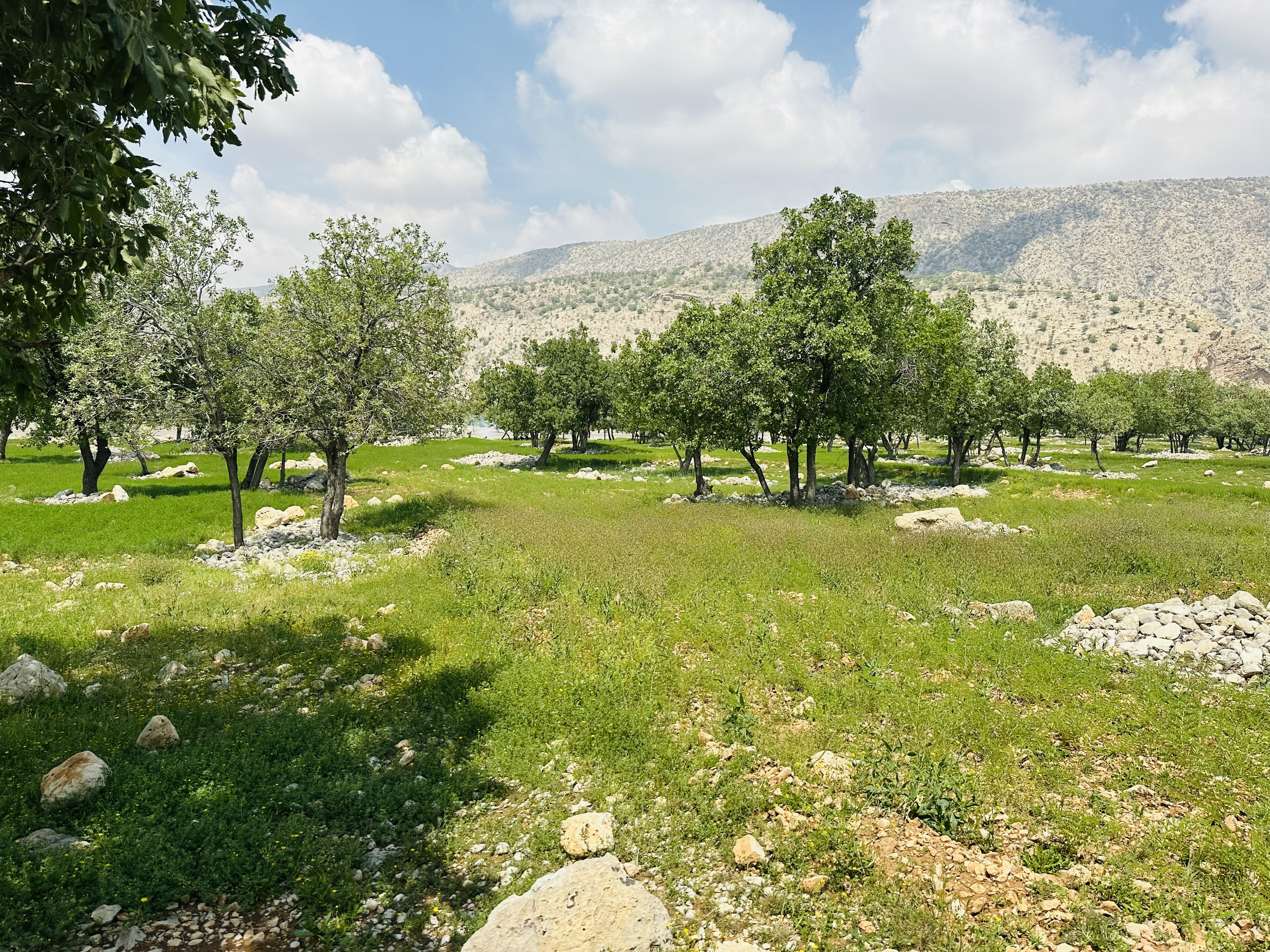

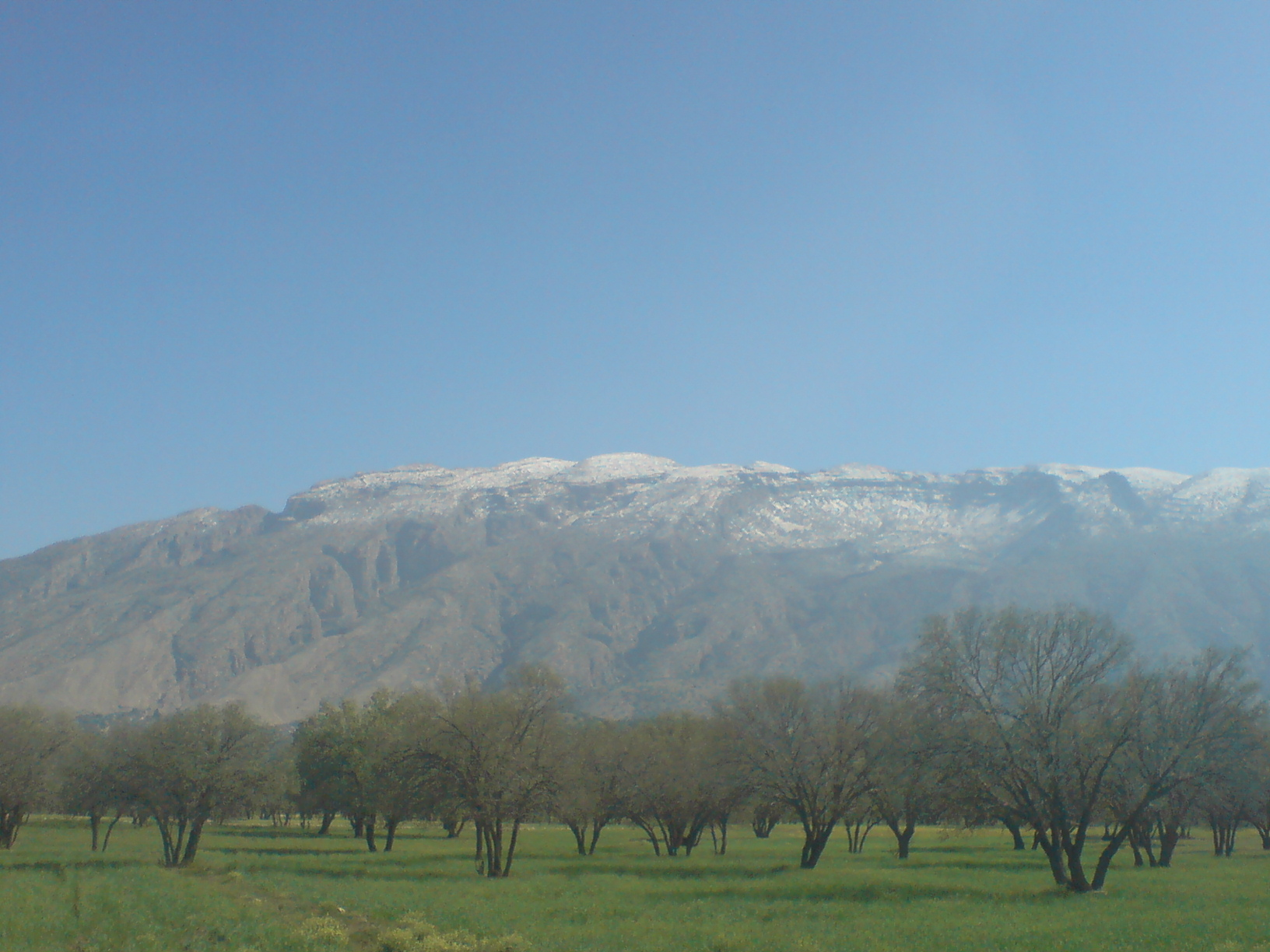
Dasht-e Barm in 2009

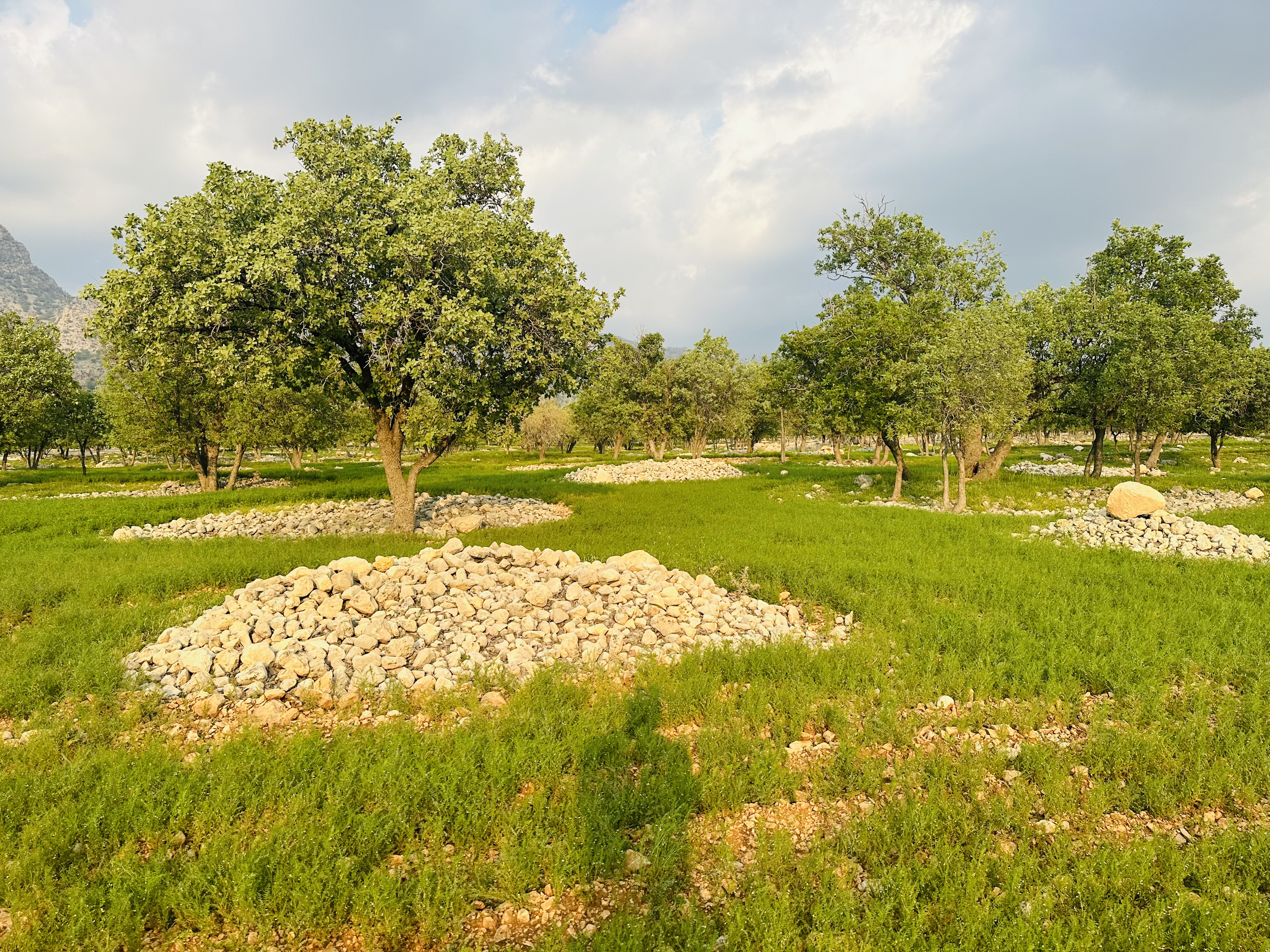

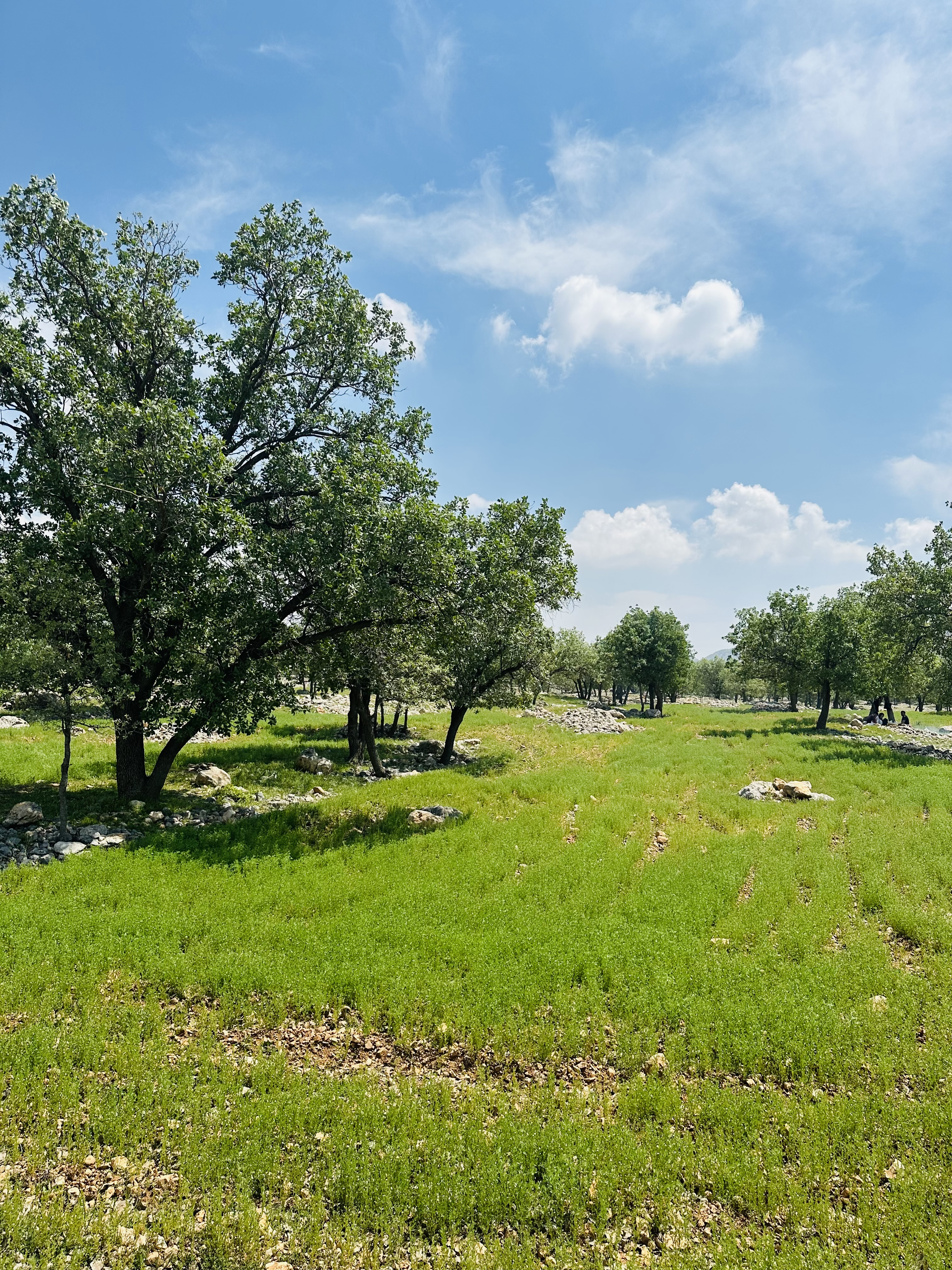

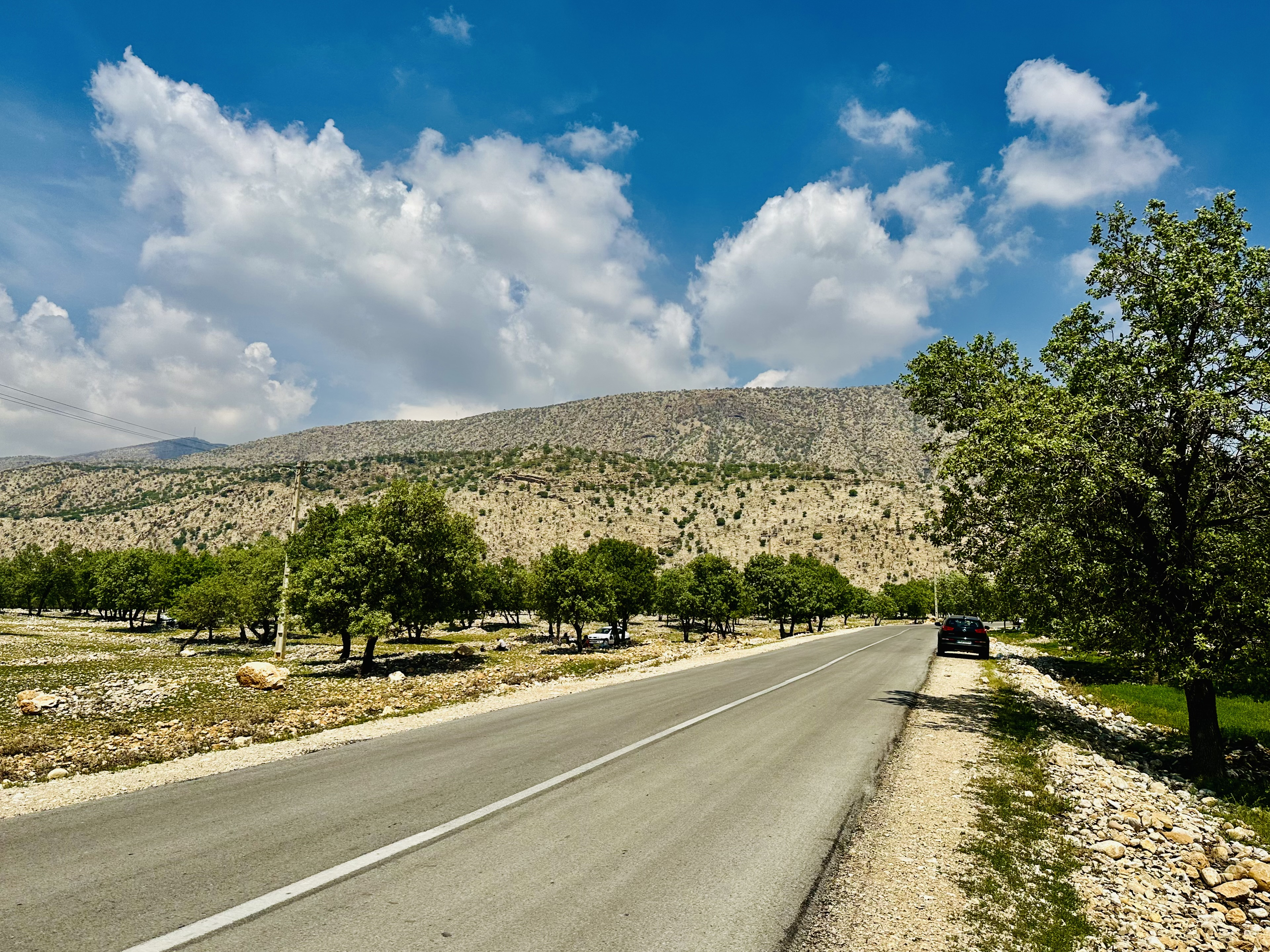
A local access road in Dasht-e Barm

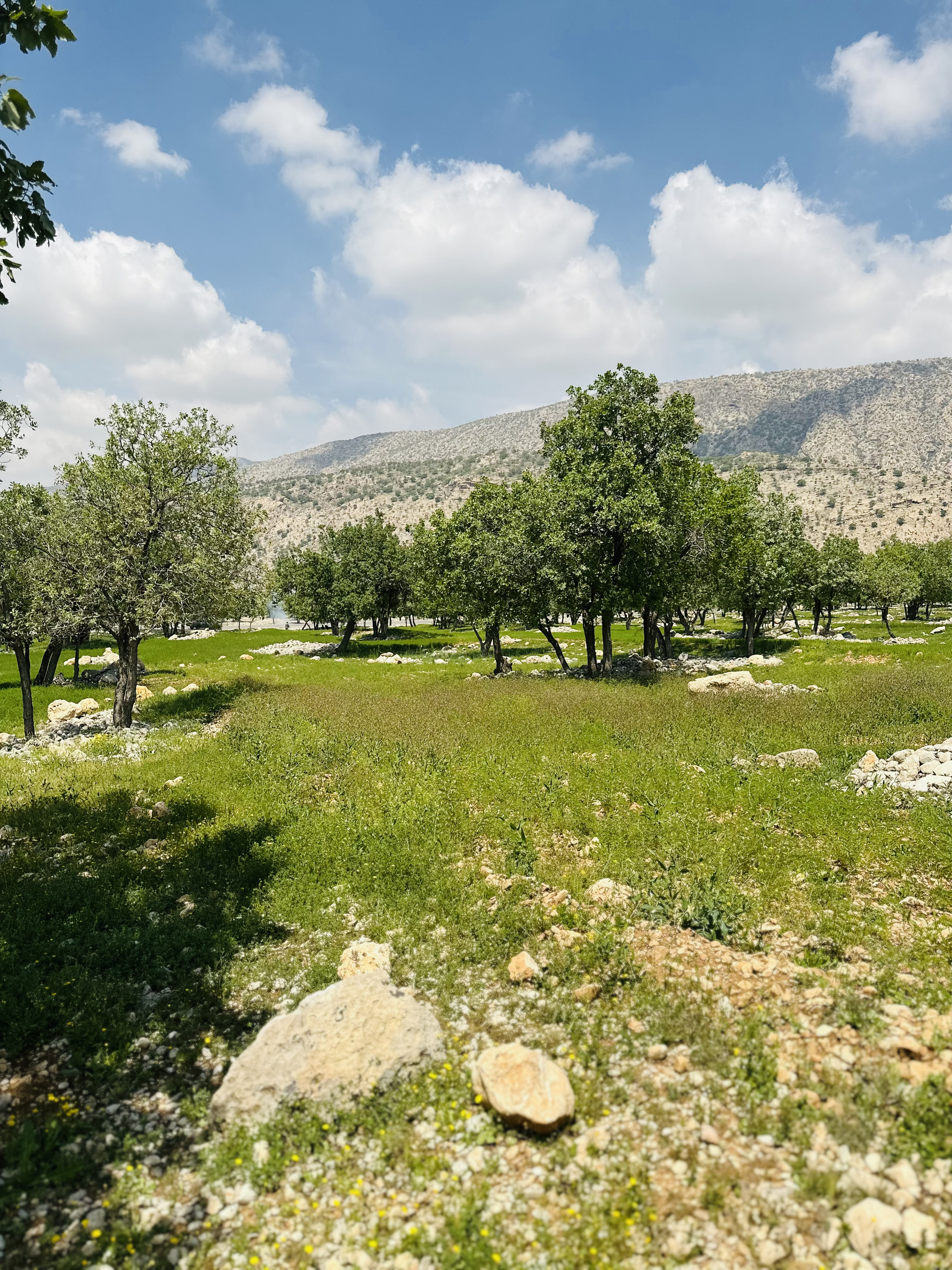

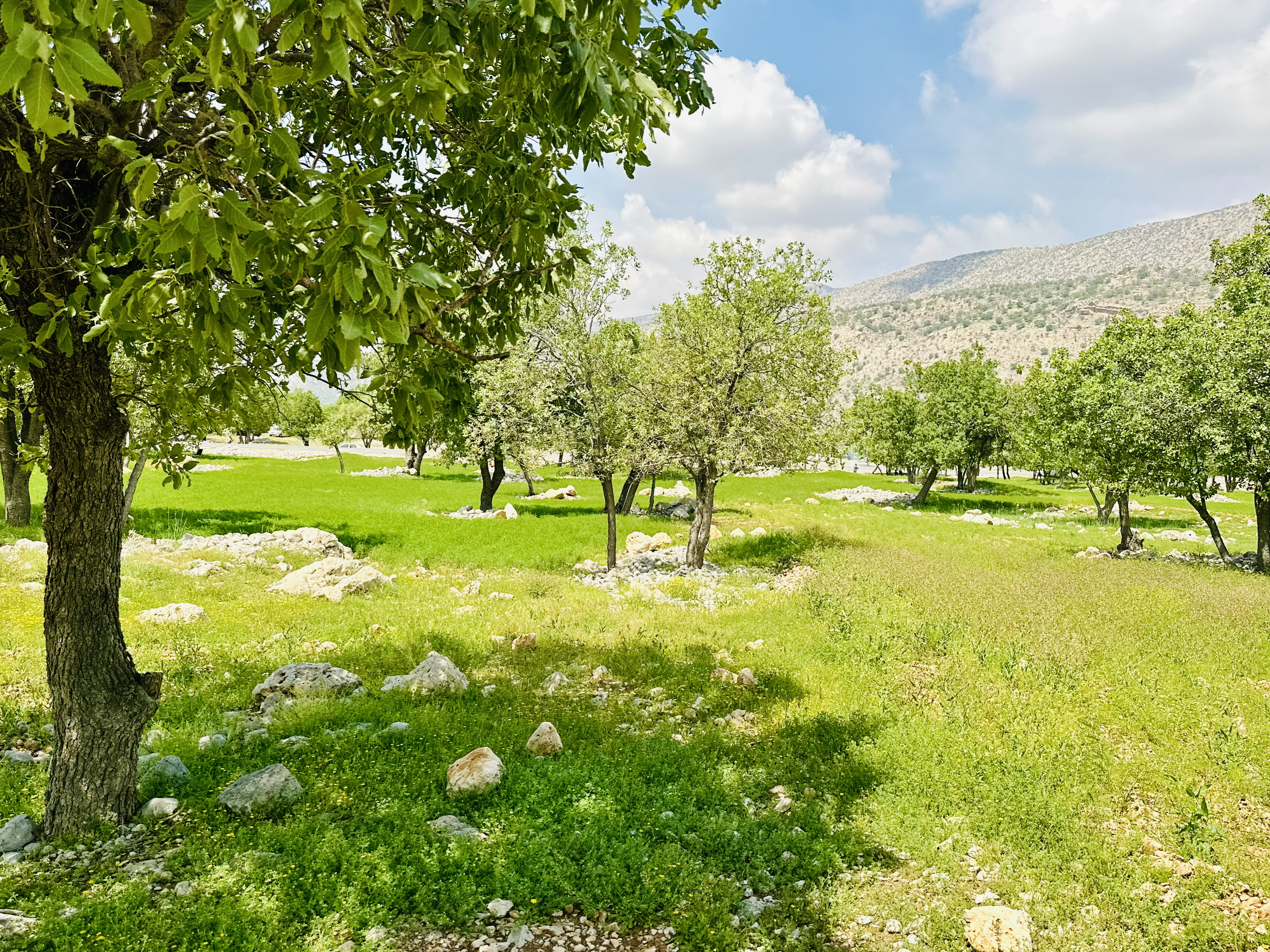

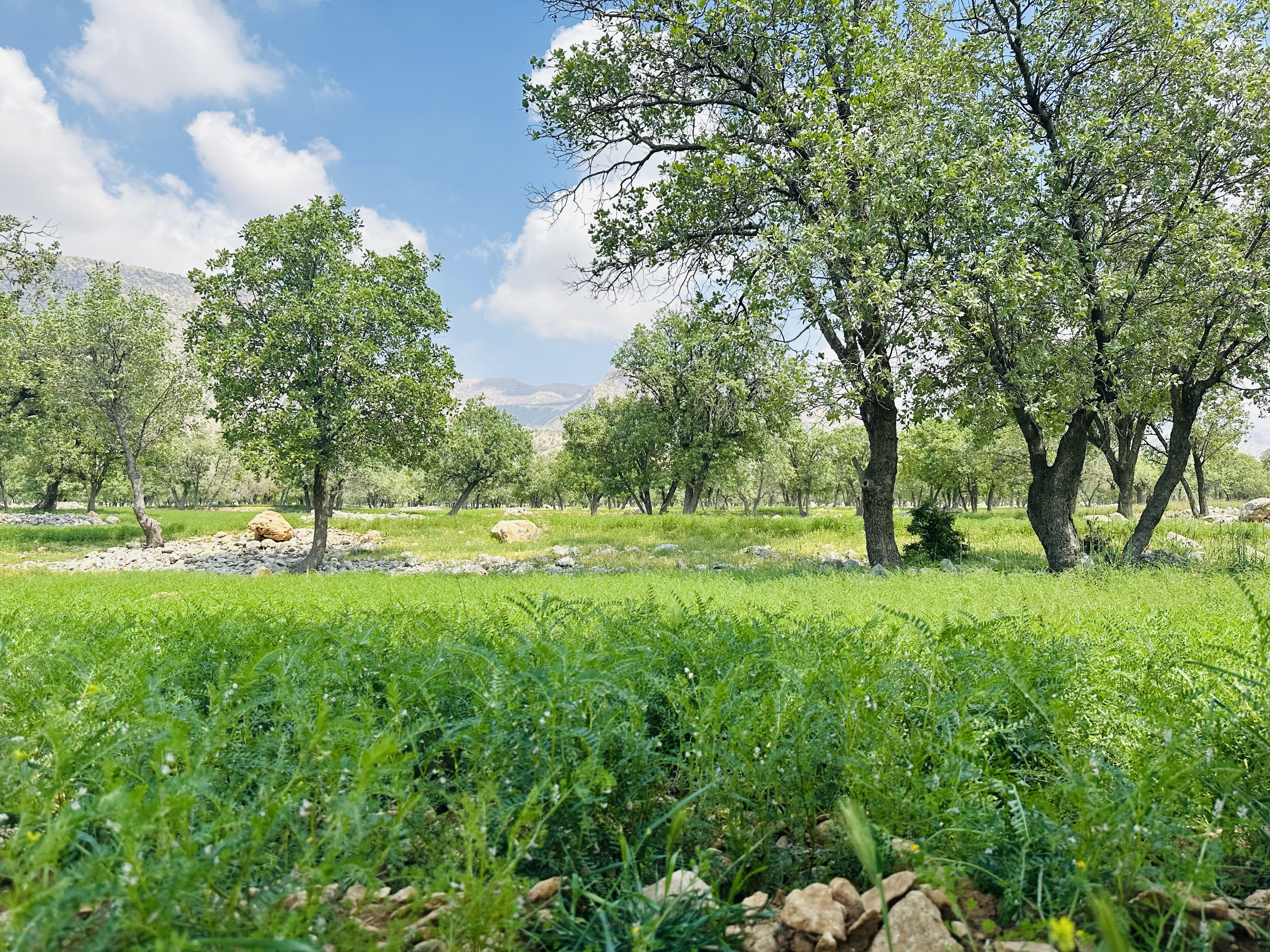

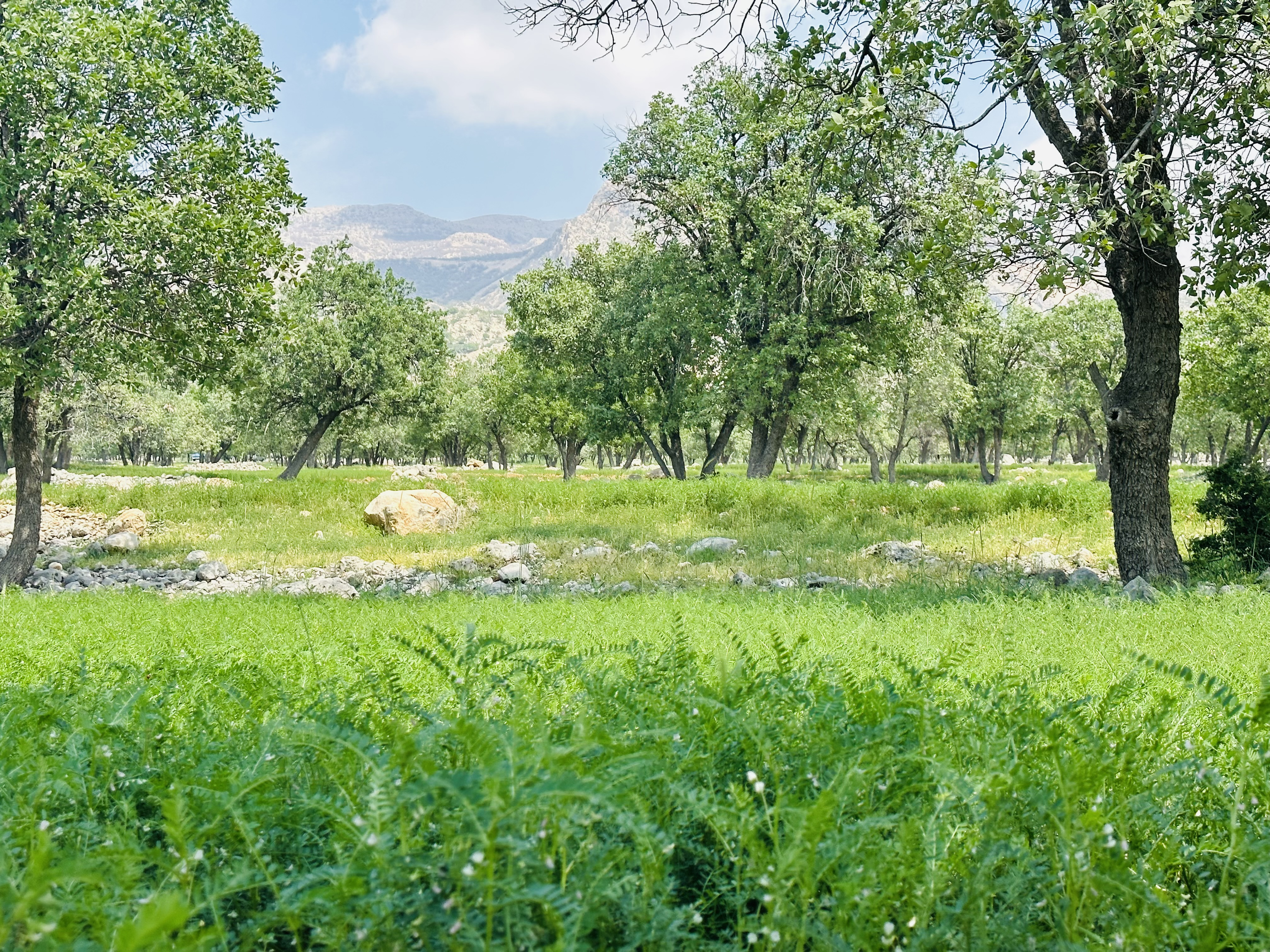

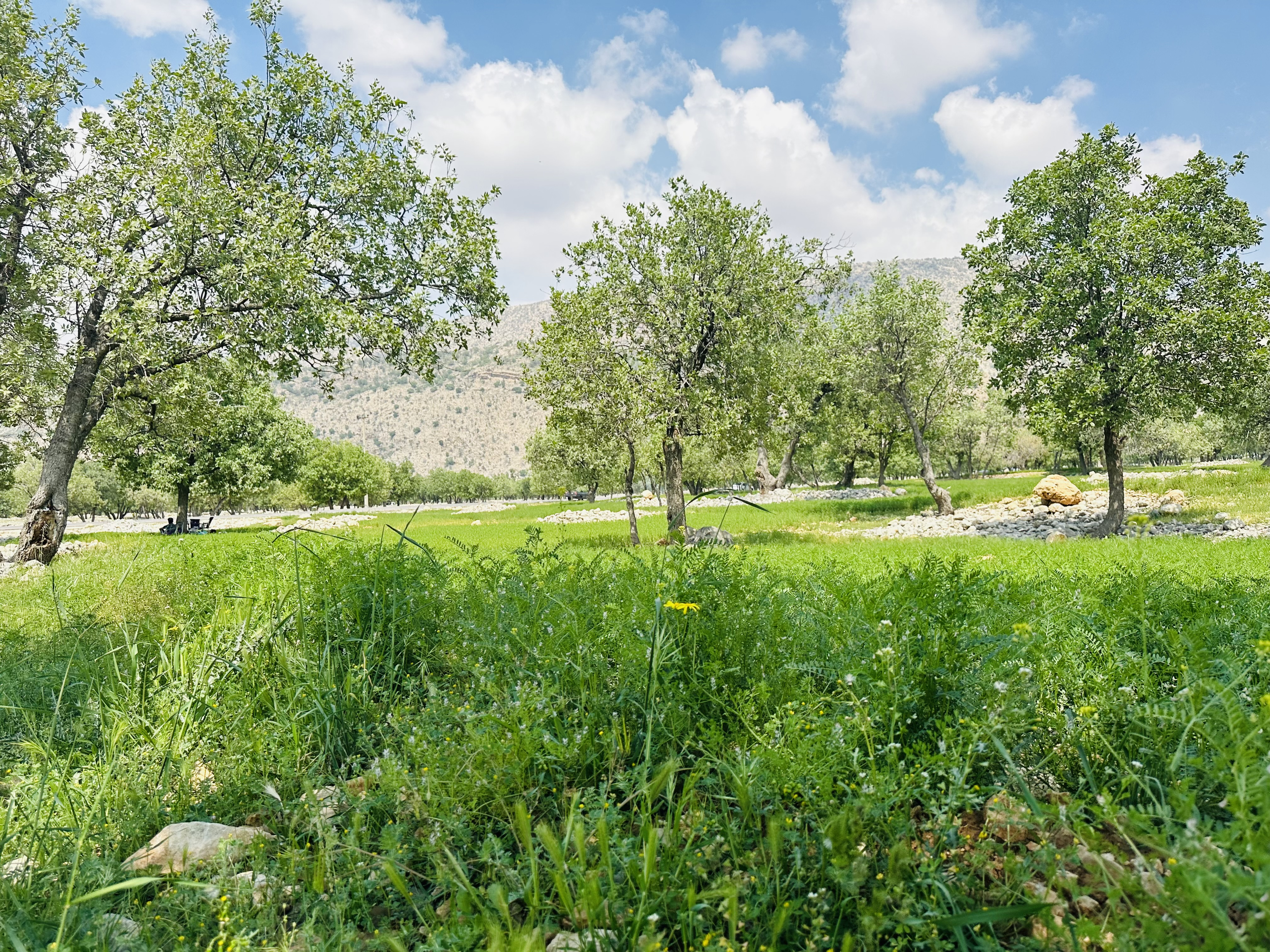

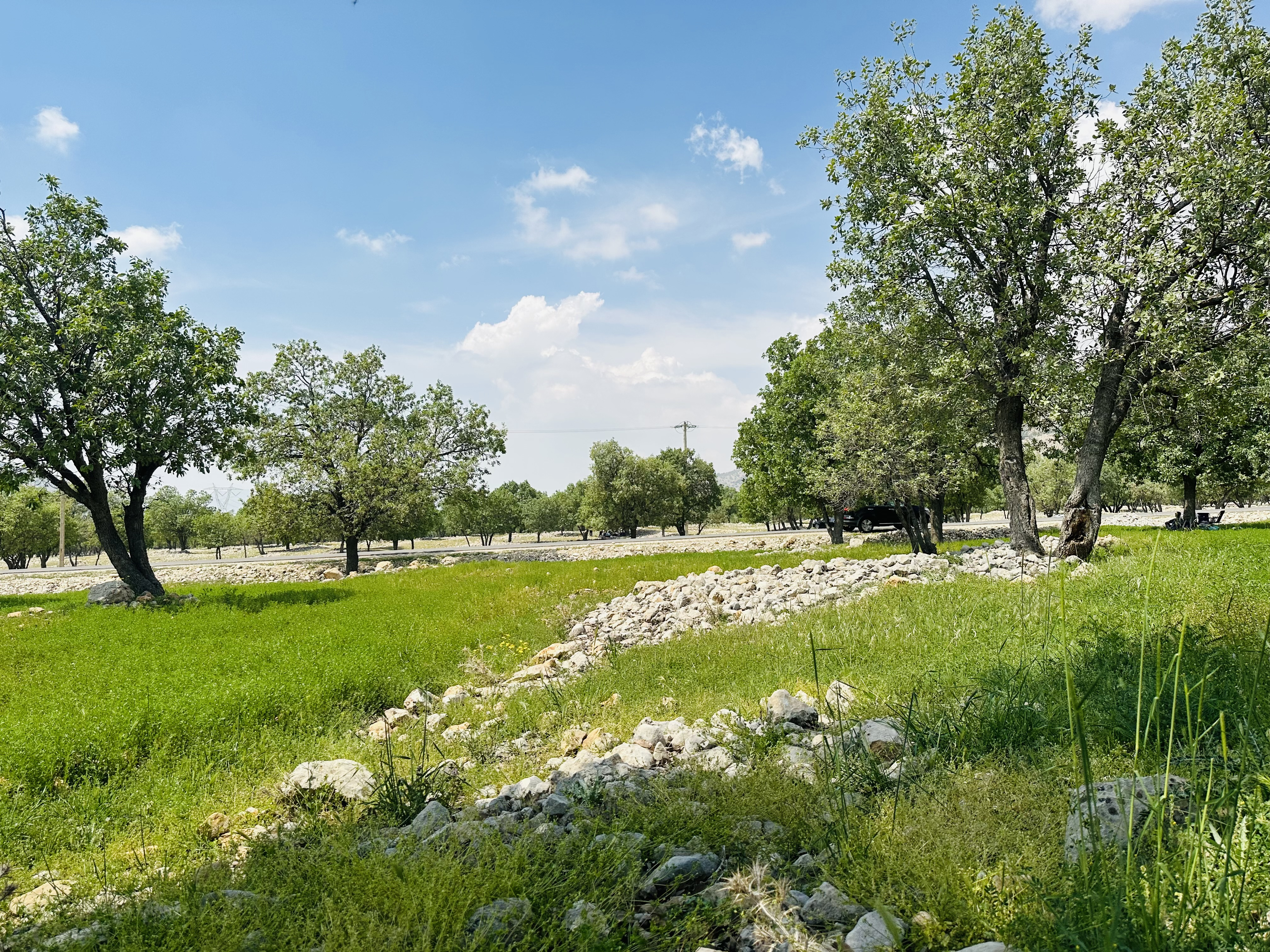

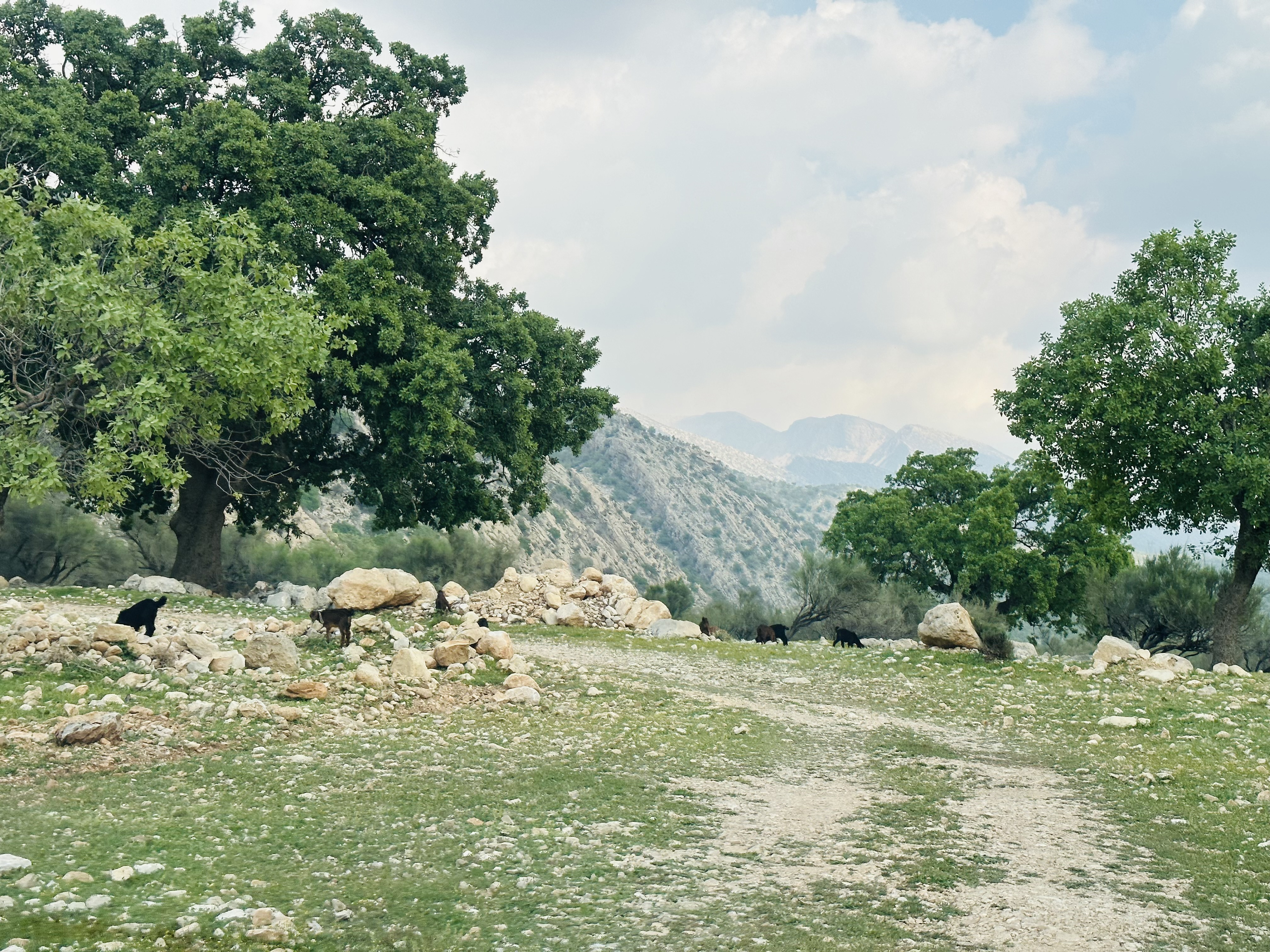

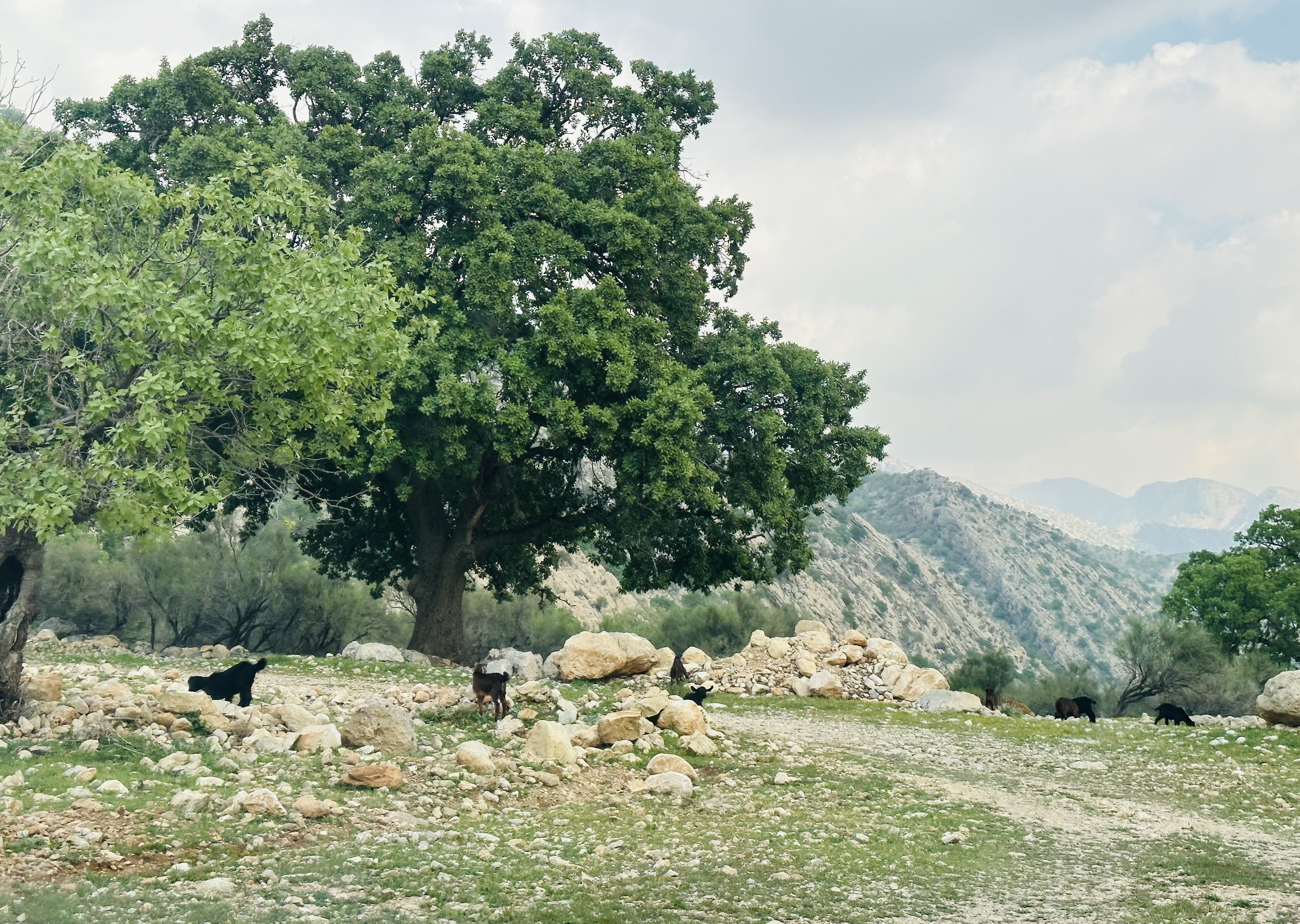

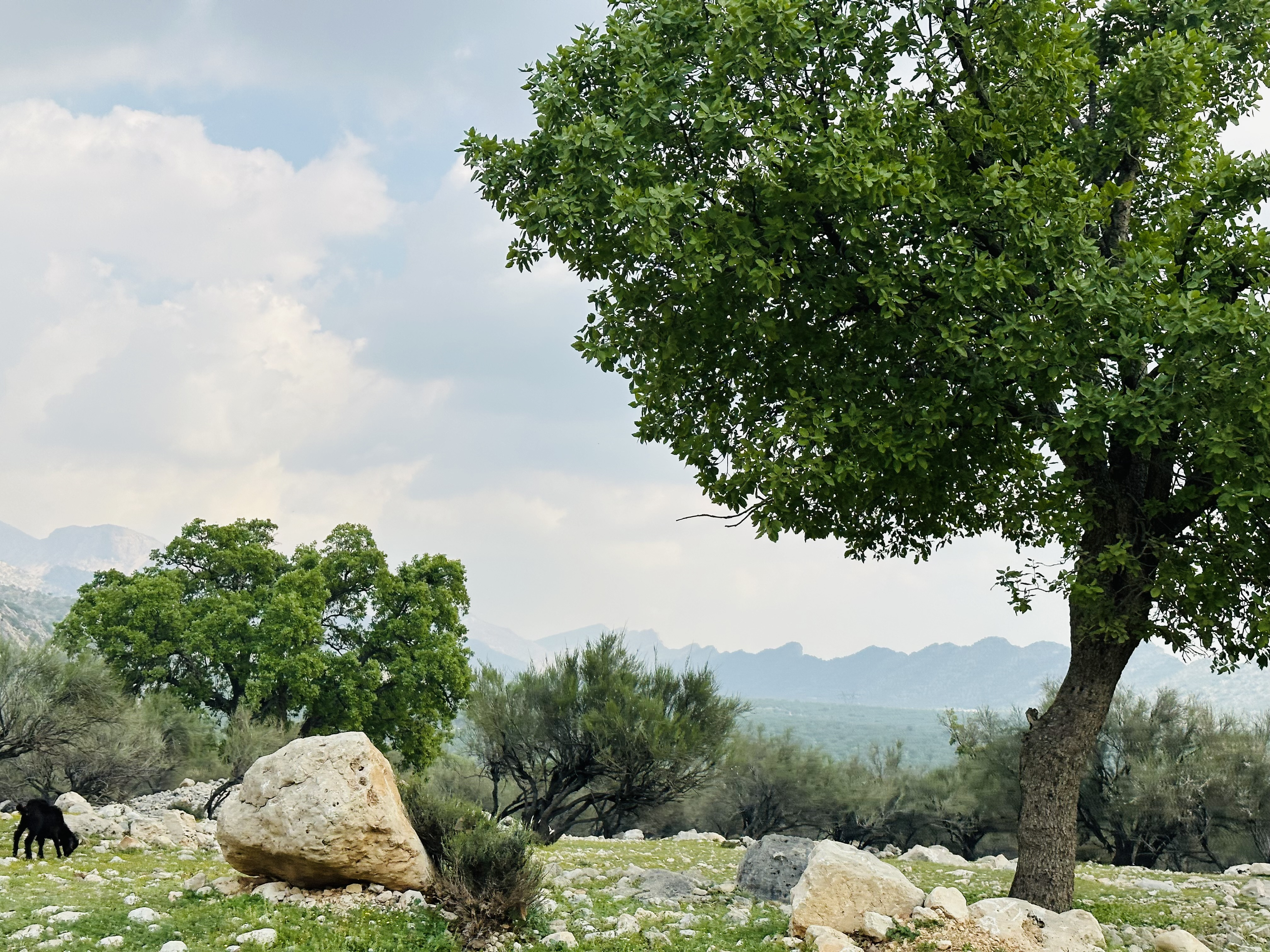

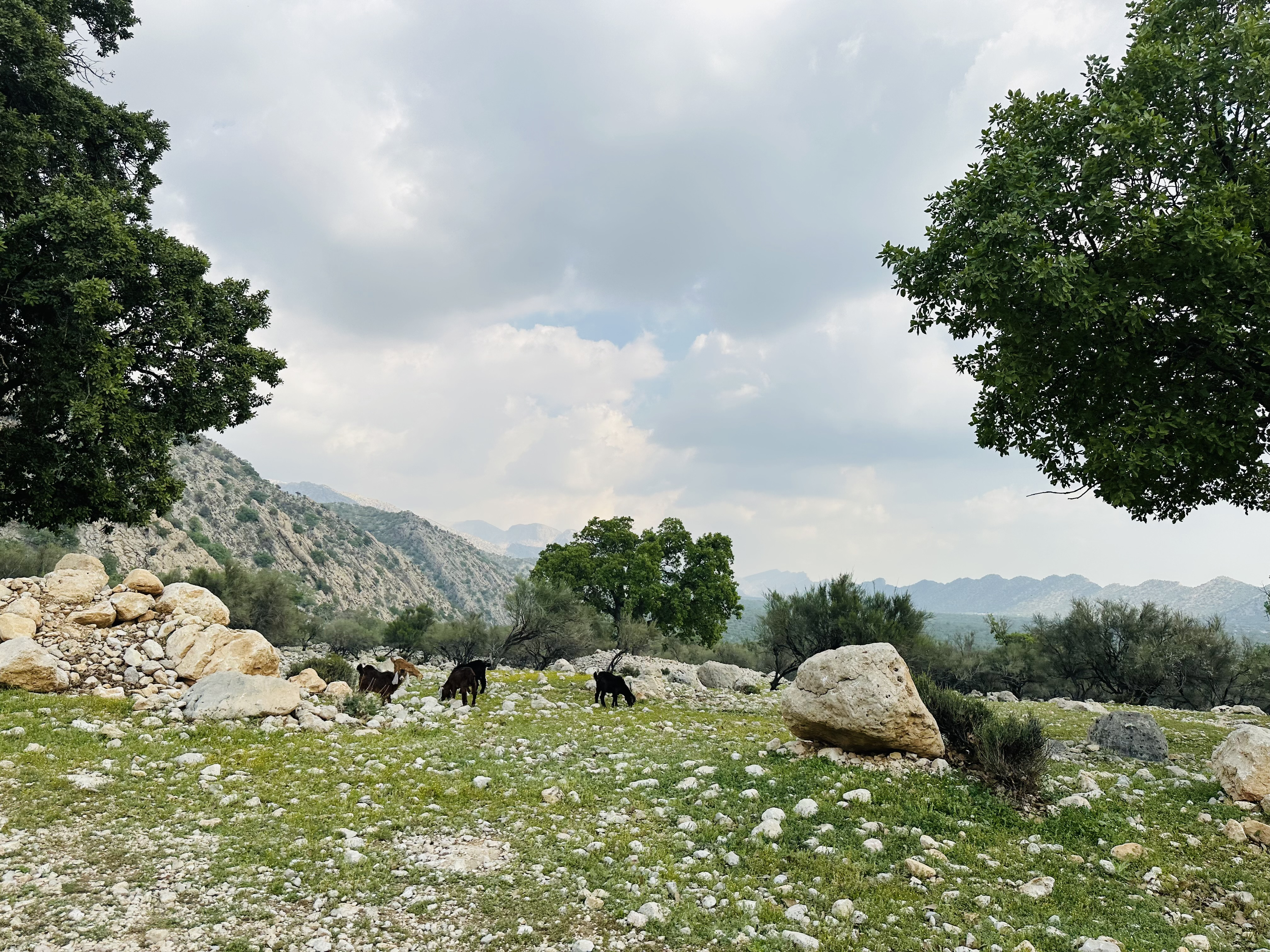

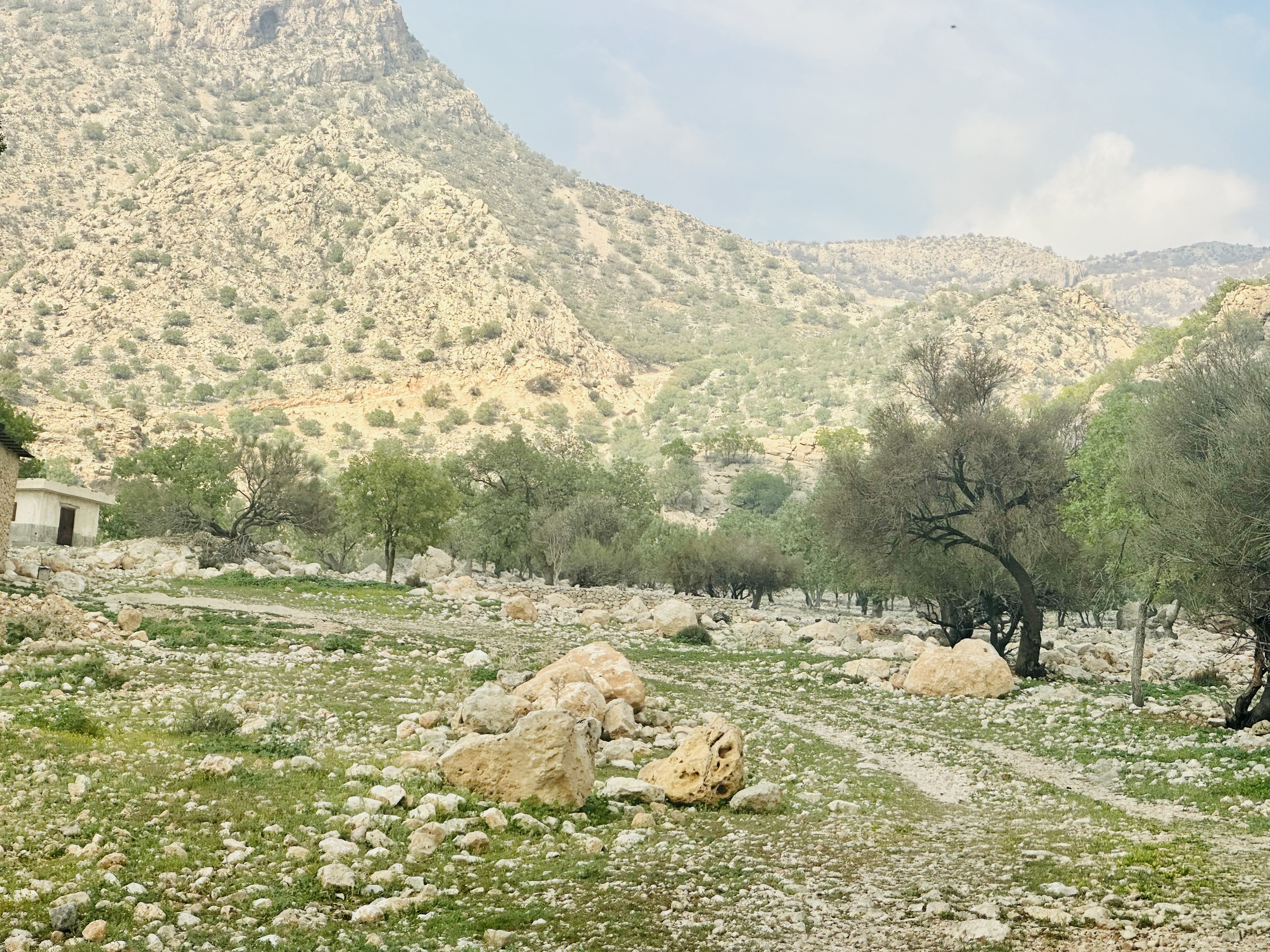

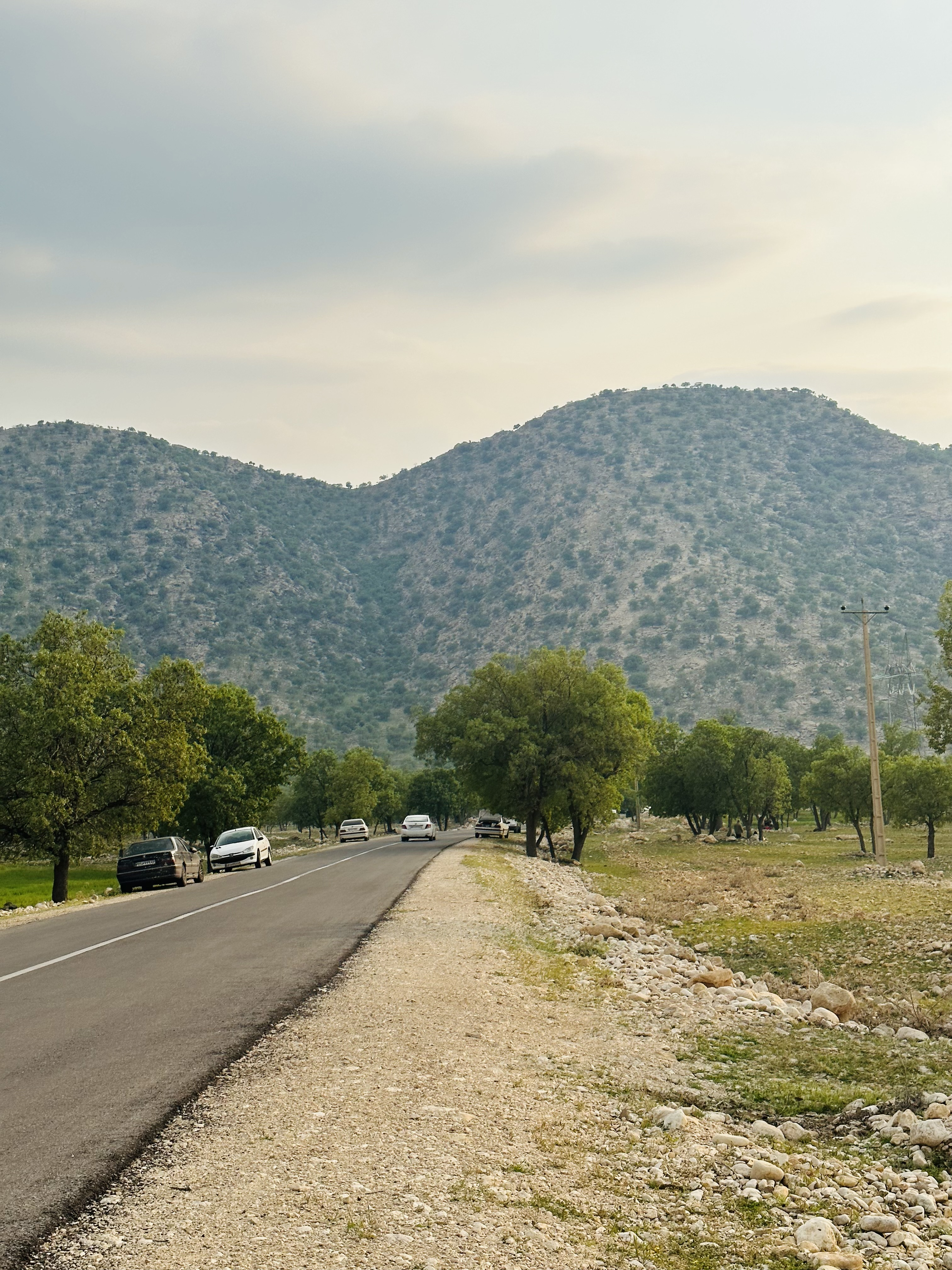

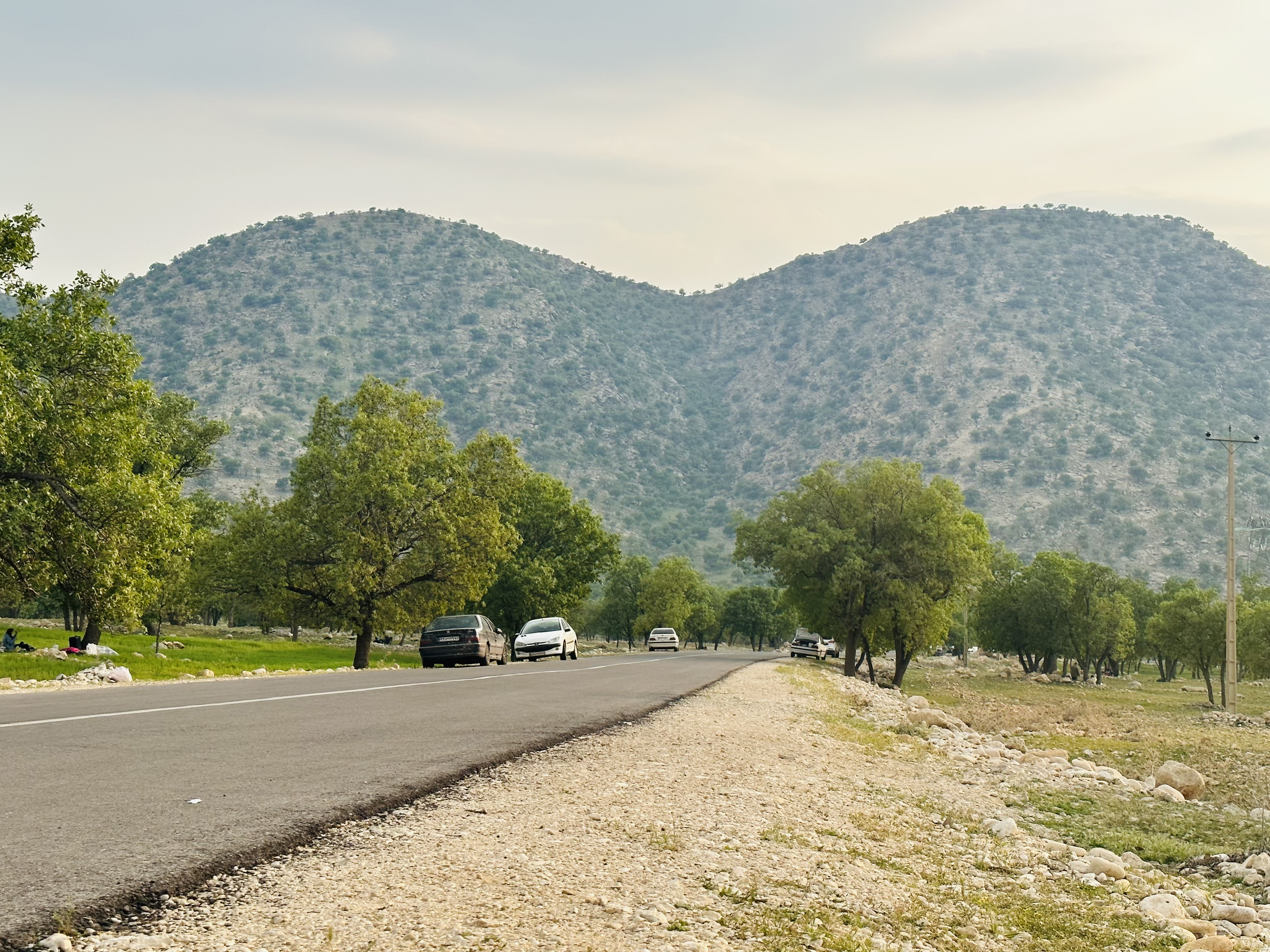

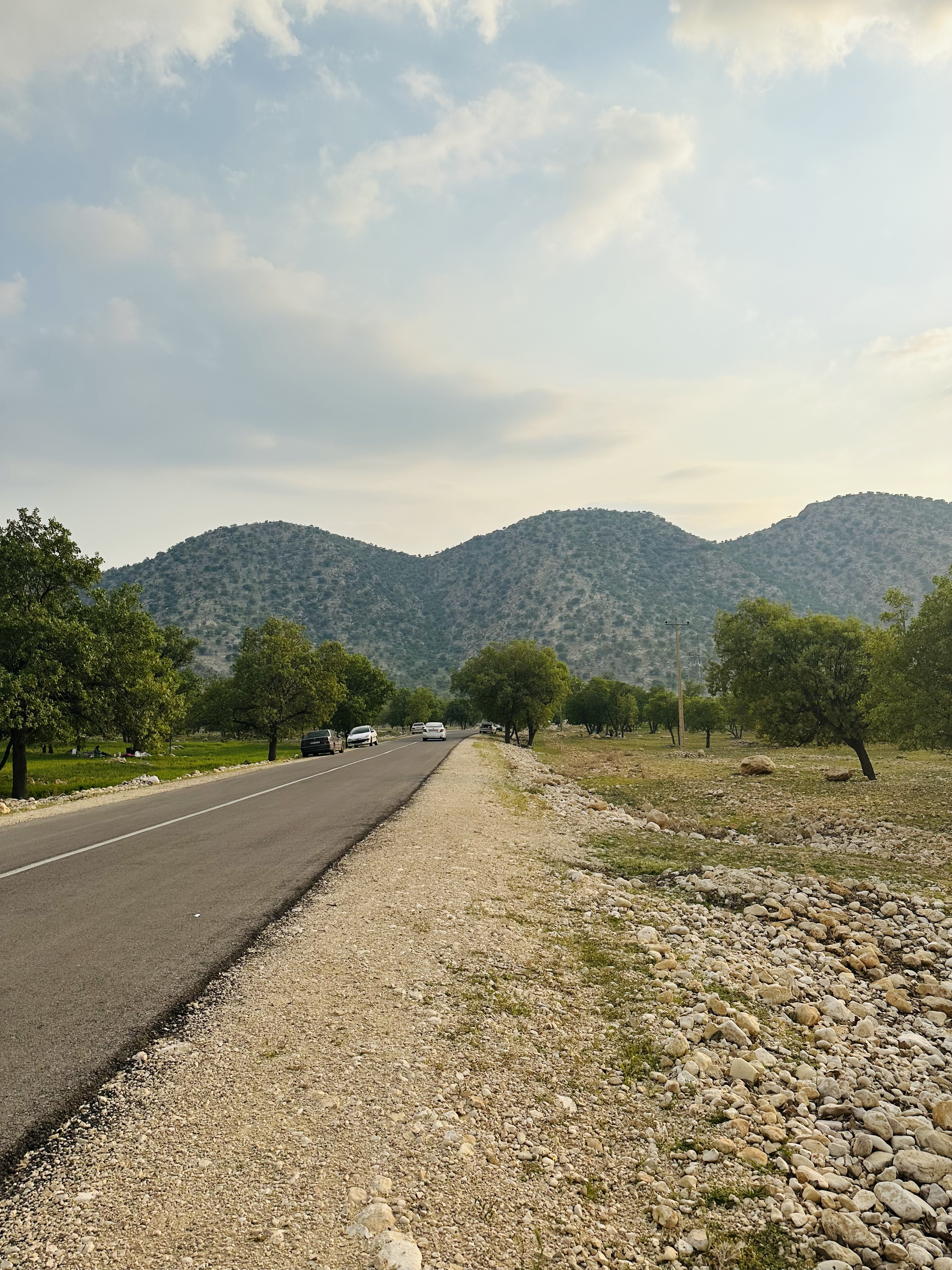

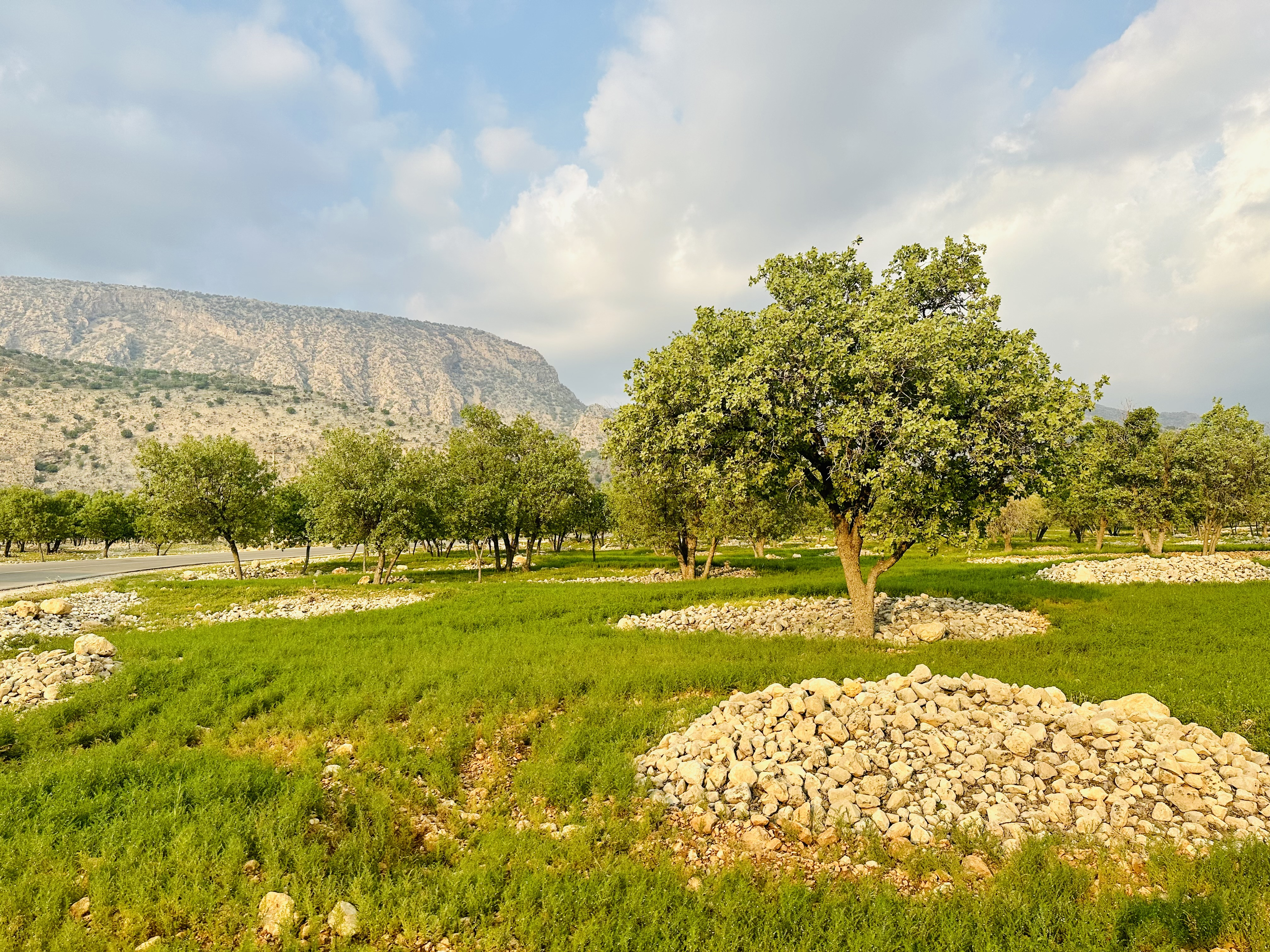

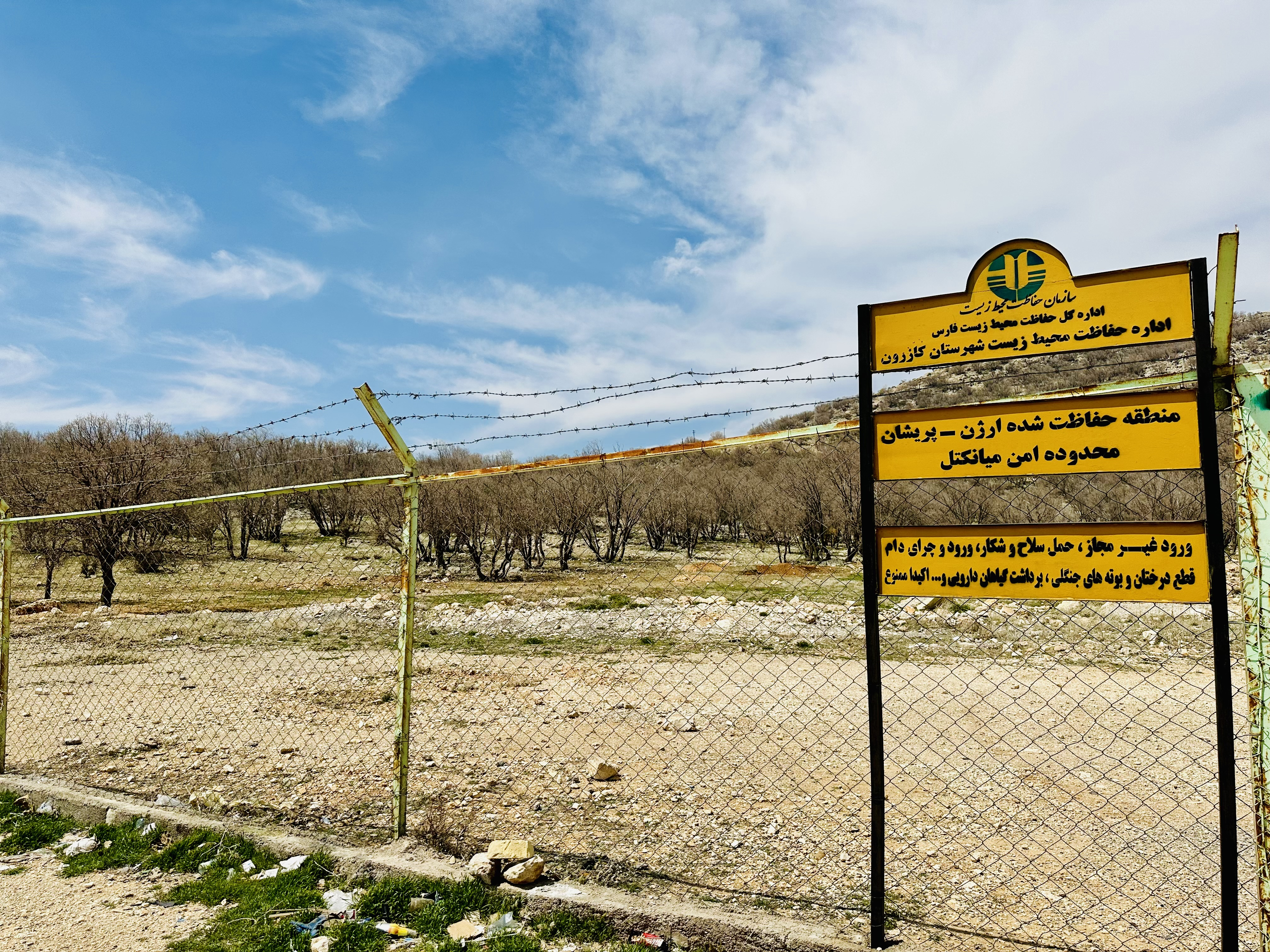
Mian Kotal Protected Area

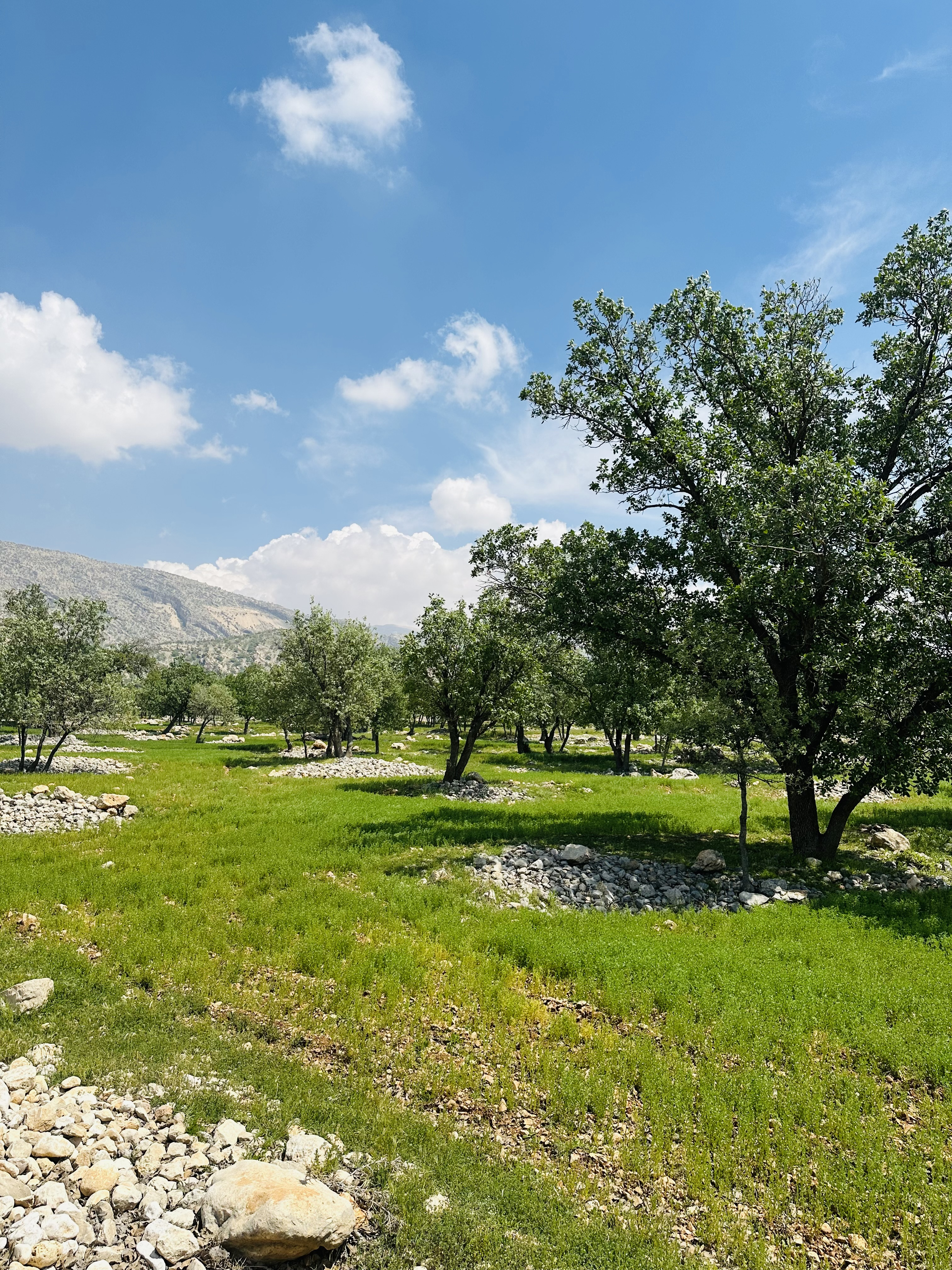

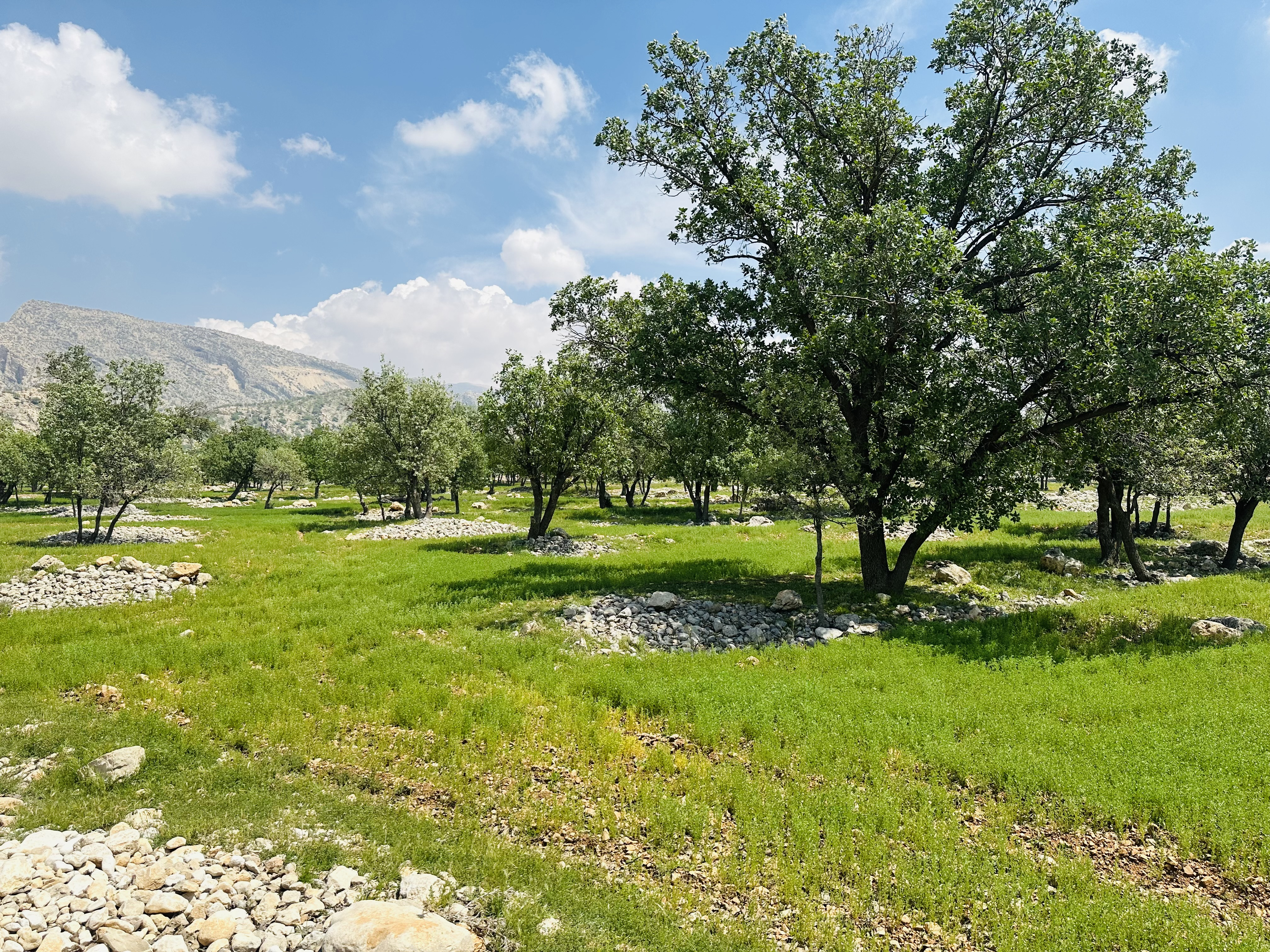

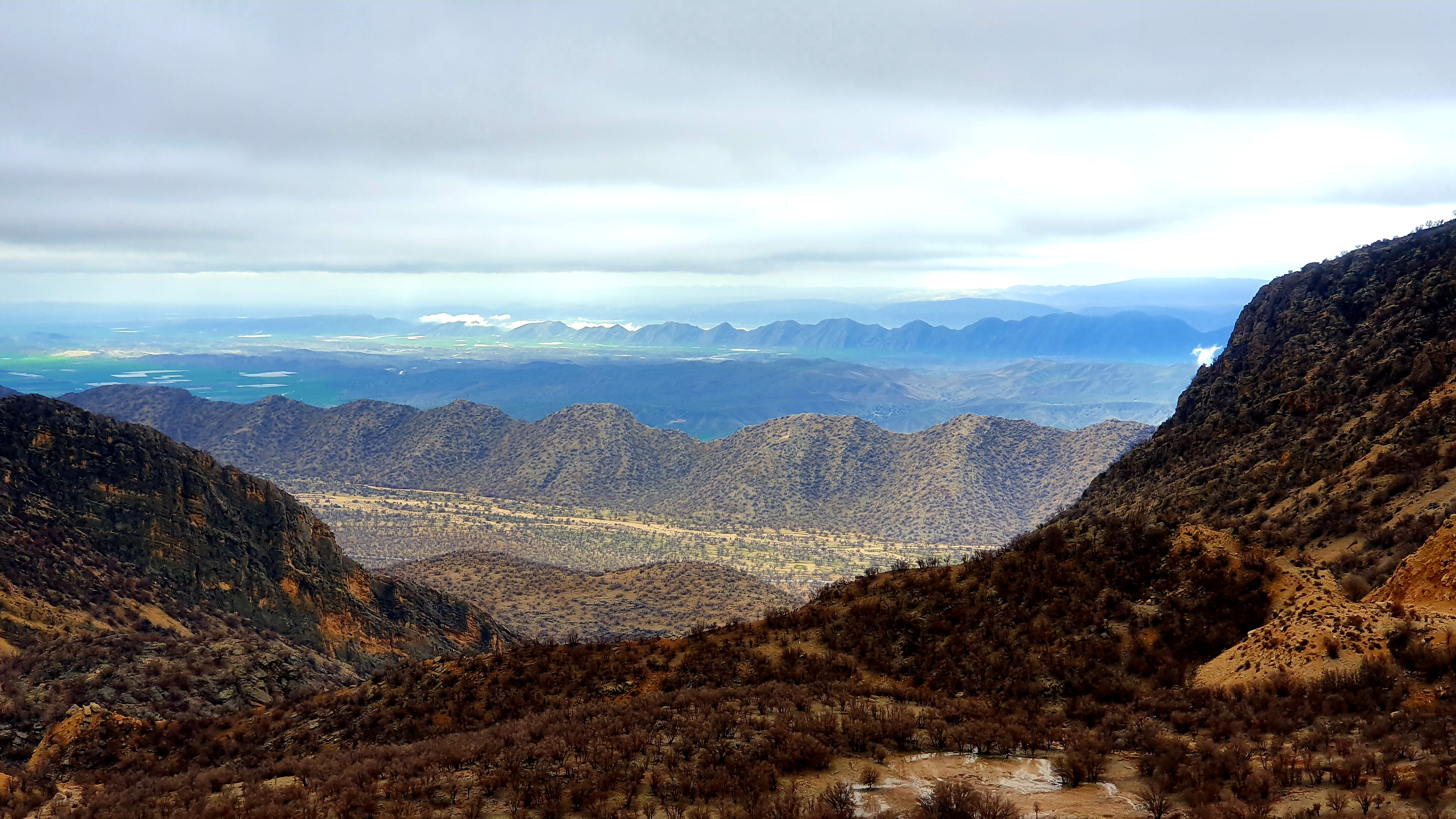
Dasht-e Barm and a distant view of Parishan Lake

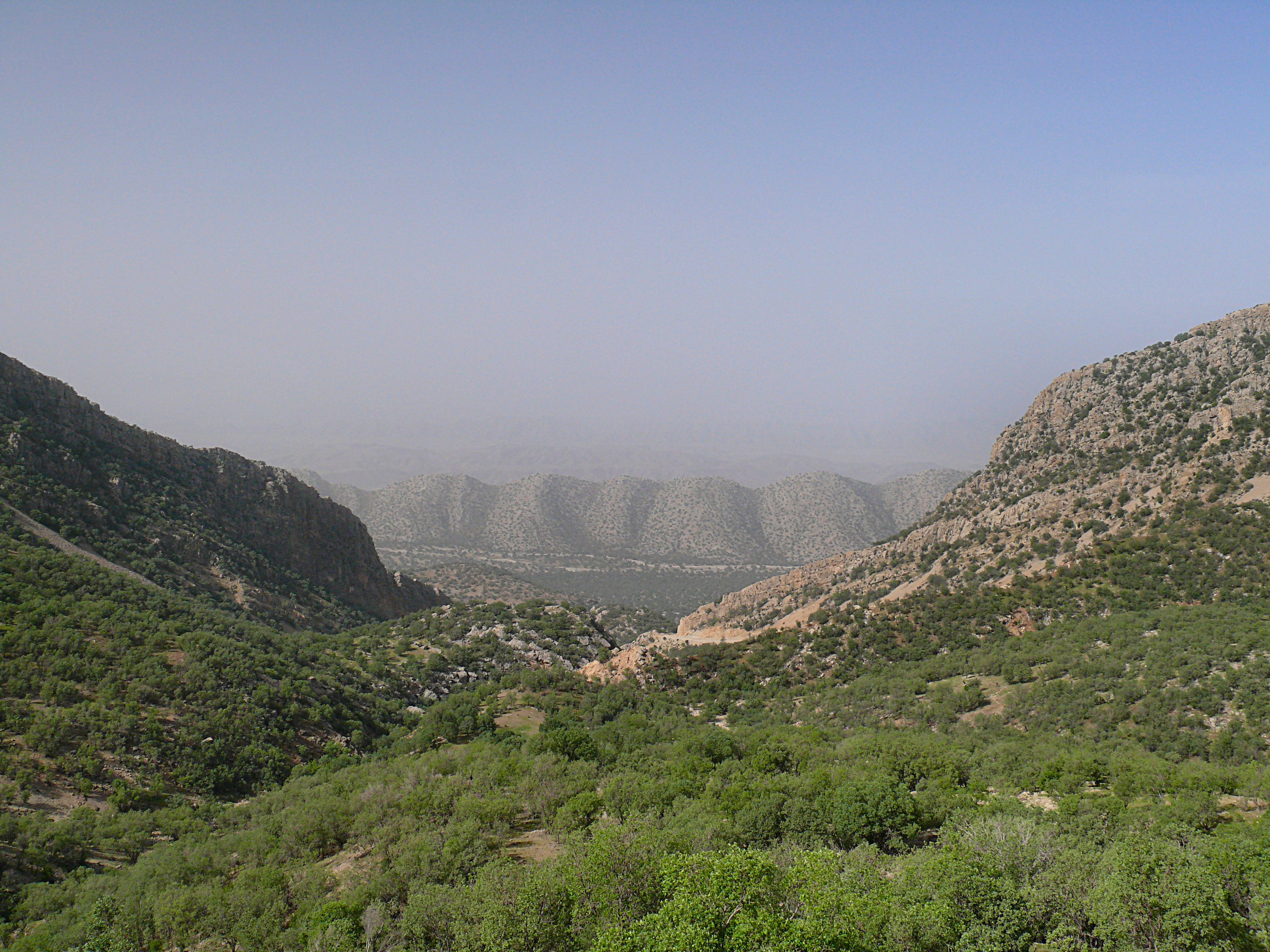

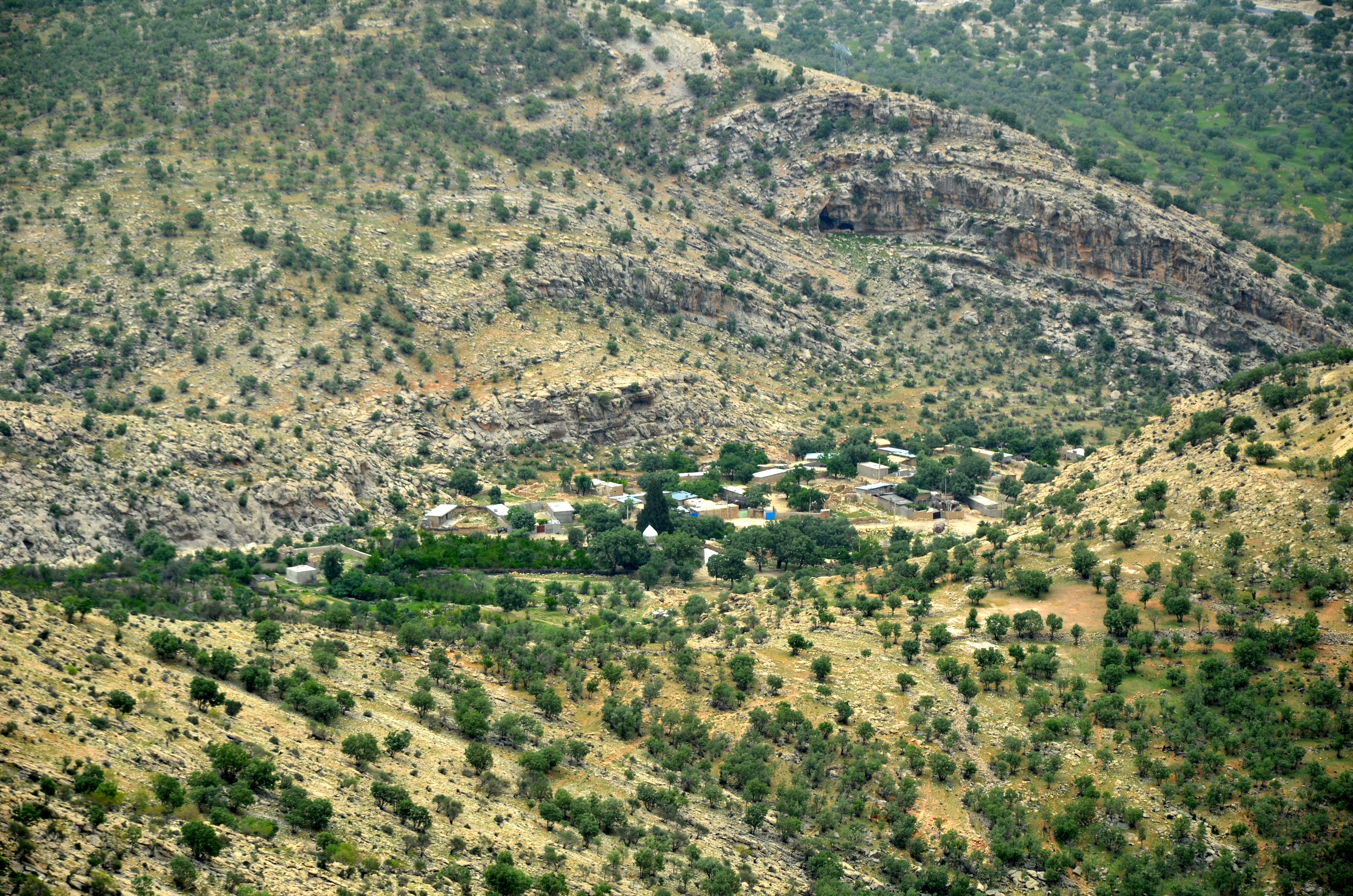

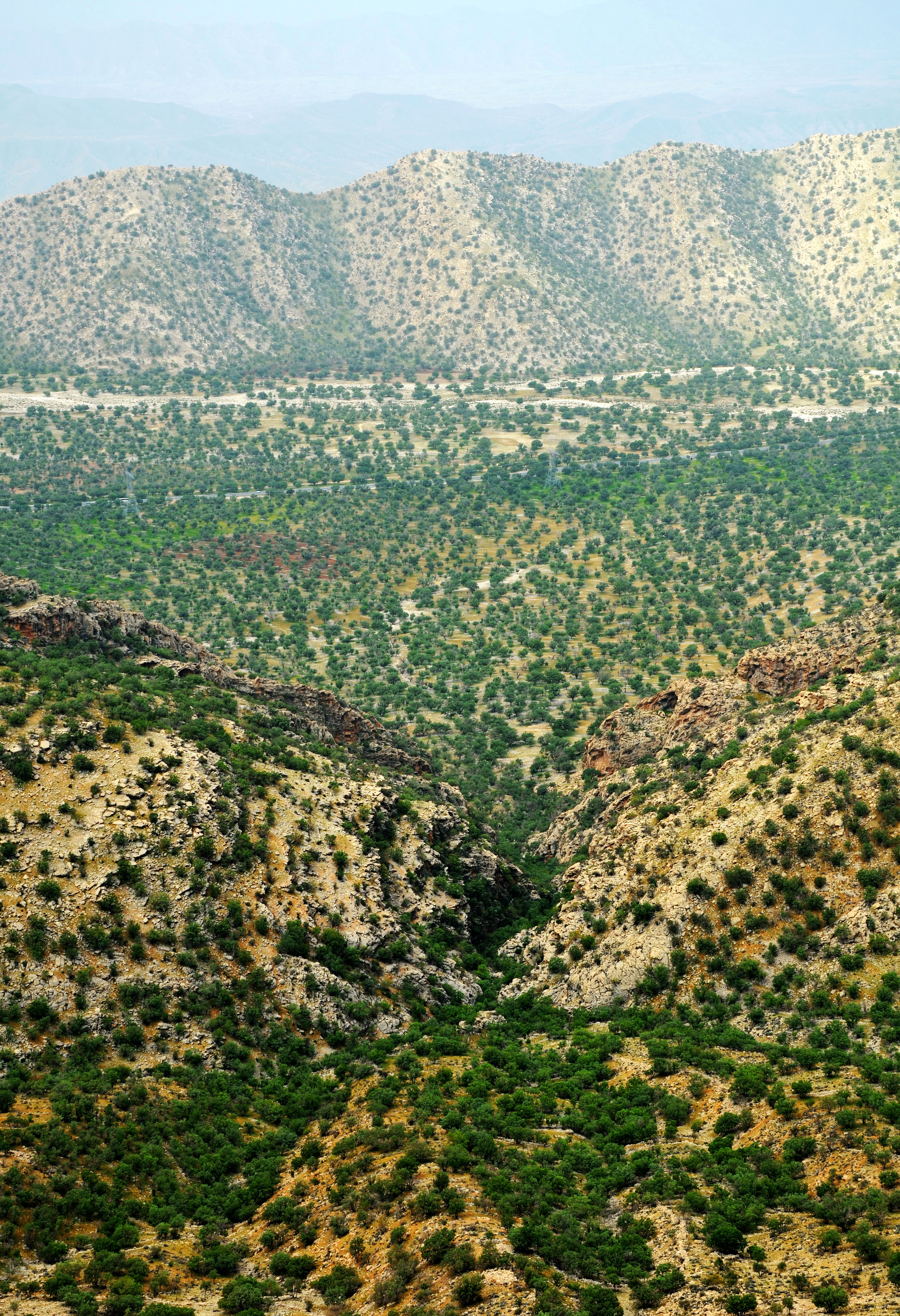

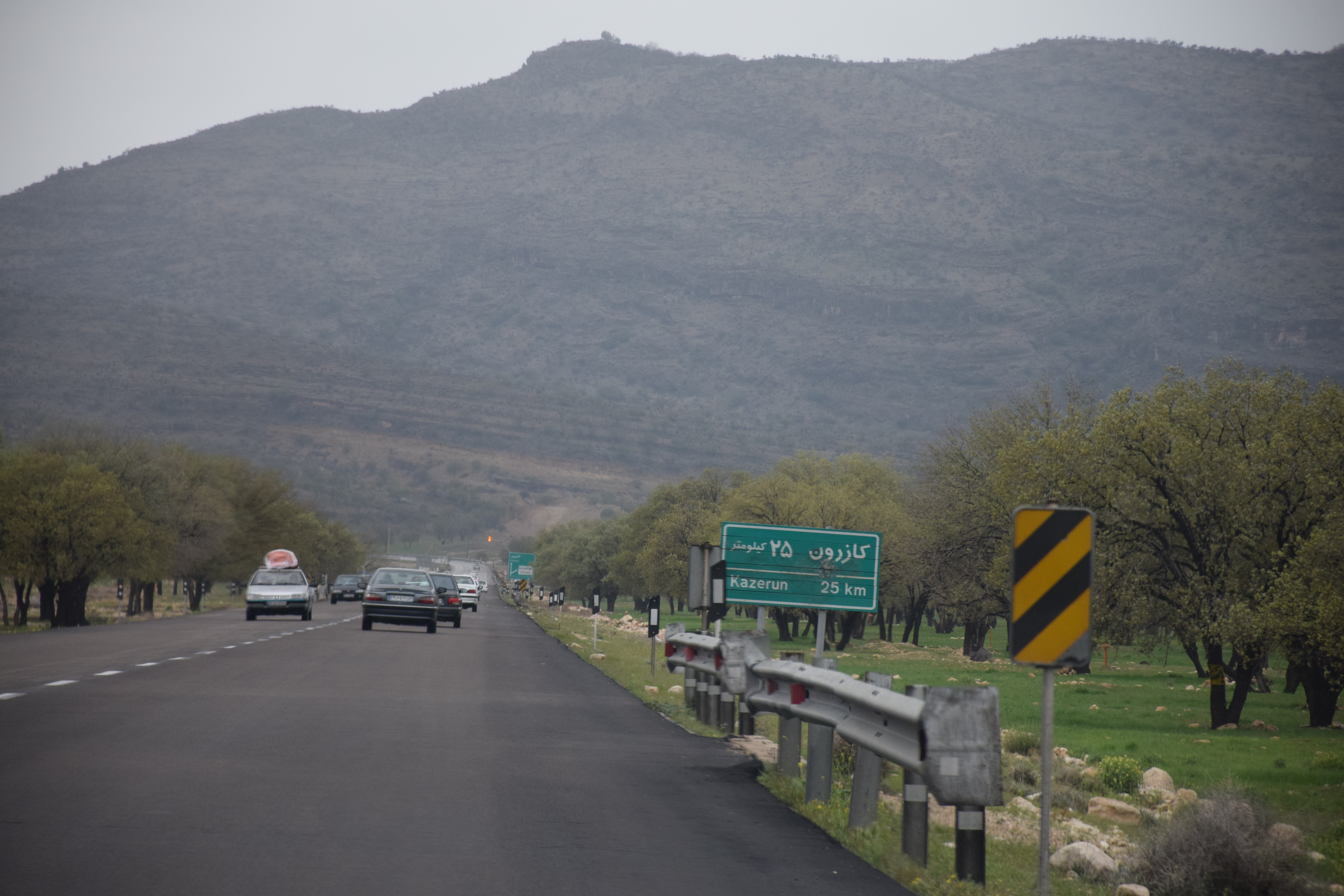
The Kazerun–Shiraz road in the Dasht-e Barm area in 2017

== See also ==
- Kazerun
- Lake Parishan
- Zagros Mountains
- Arjan and Parishan Protected Area
- Fars Province
- Forests of Iran
- Wildlife of Iran
- Environment of Iran
- Persian fallow deer

== Resources ==
- UNESCO. Arjan and Parishan Biosphere Reserve. United Nations Educational, Scientific and Cultural Organization (UNESCO). Retrieved 2025-11-08.
- Ramsar Convention Secretariat. Lake Parishan & Dasht-e-Arjan. Ramsar Sites Information Service (RSIS). Retrieved 2025-11-08.
- Incredible Iran. The Most Beautiful Forests of Iran. Travel and Culture Blog. Retrieved 2025-11-08.
- Moradi, M. J.; Pourmajidian, M. R.; Tavankar, F. (2020). Detection of high potential areas of Persian oak forests: oak (Quercus brantii Lindl.) tree decline in Dashte-Barm of Kazeroon, Fars Province. Cerne Journal 26(1): 104–112.
- Ahmadi, Shahram; Zahedi Amiri, Ghavamoddin; Marvie Mohadjer, Mohammad Reza (2016). Mapping Brant’s oak (Quercus brantii Lindl.) mortality using geostatistical methods in Dasht-e Barm, Fars Province. FAO AGRIS Database.
- Jamali, Samad; Haack, Robert A. (2024). From Glory to Decline: Uncovering Causes of Oak Decline in Iran. Forest Pathology 54: e12898.
- Hosseini, Ahmad (2024). Drought-Induced Tree Decline Changed the Structure of Persian Oak Forests. Forestist 74(3): 327–332.
- Hosseini, Ahmad; Hosseini, Seyed M.; Linares, Juan C. (2023). Site factors and stand conditions associated with Persian oak decline in Zagros mountain forests. Forest Systems. DOI:10.5424/fs/2017263-11298.
