= Iran protests =

Iran protests or similar terms may refer to:

- 1905–1911 Persian Constitutional Revolution, ending absolute monarchy
- 1921 Persian coup d'état, ending the rule of Qajar dynasty
- 1953 Iranian coup d'état, deposal of Mohammad Mosaddegh
- 1979 Islamic Revolution, deposal of the Shah and accession of Khomeini
- 1979 International Women's Day protests in Tehran, against mandatory hijab
- 1999 Iranian student protests, against the closure of the reformist newspaper Salam
- 2003 Iranian student protests, against the government and president Khatami
- 2009–2010 Iranian presidential election protests, against president Mahmoud Ahmadinejad and alleged voting fraud
- 2011–2012 Iranian protests, against government crackdown of the 2009 protests
- 2016 Cyrus the Great Revolt, for the restoration of monarchy at the Tomb of Cyrus the Great
- 2017–2018 Iranian protests, against government corruption and economic hardship
- Iranian protests against compulsory hijab
- 2018–2019 Iranian general strikes and protests, against crackdowns of previous protests and economic hardship
  - 2018 Dervish protests
  - 2019 protests in Iran
- 2019–2020 Iranian protests, against the government, also known as bloody november
  - Ukraine International Airlines Flight 752 protests, against IRGC shootdown of Ukraine International Airlines Flight 752
- 2021–2022 Iranian protests, related to power and water insecurity and broader demands for democracy
  - 2021 Iran workers' strike
  - 2021 Sistan and Baluchestan protests
  - 2022 Iranian food protests
- 2022–23: Mahsa Amini protests, begun in September 2022 and related to police brutality by virtue police against women

== 2025 protests ==
- 2025 Iran water crisis protests, caused by water shortages and government mismanagement
  - May 2025 Iranian protests
  - 2025 Iranian Farmers' Protests
- 2025–2026 Iranian protests, against the government, caused by economy mismanagement and human rights abuses

== See also ==
- Iran crisis (disambiguation)
- 2026 Iranian diaspora protests
- Global day of action for the Iranian people
- Woman, Life, Freedom movement
- Iranian Green Movement
- 2026 Iran massacres
- 1981–1982 Iran massacres
- 1988 executions of Iranian political prisoners
