= 2018 protests in Iran =

Topics referred to by the same term

The 2018 protests in Iran (Persian: اعتراضات سال ۲۰۱۸ در ایران) may refer to the following:

== List of protests ==
- 2017–2018 Iranian protests – a wave of anti-government protests between December 2017 and January 2018 after egg prices soared and a new budget law was passed
- 2018 Dervish protests – protests against discrimination of the Ni'matullāhī in February 2018
- 2018 Khuzestan protests – protests in Khuzestan in March 2018
- August 2018 uprising in Iran – demonstrations in July and August 2018 over economic demands
- 2018 Iranian university protests – protests from students in December 2018 over poor educational conditions
- 2018–2019 Iranian general strikes and protests – a series of strikes and protests by various groups over primarily economic demands
  - 2018 Iranian water protests – protests against government water mismanagement leading to worsened water scarcity in Iran
