= 2021–2022 Iranian protests =

Iranian series of protests

- Date: 15 July 2021 – 15 September 2022
- Location: Iran
- Caused by: Water crisis in Iran; Unemployment, widespread poverty and inflation.
- Goals: Deposition of Supreme Leader Ali Khamenei and President Ebrahim Raisi; Overthrow of the Islamic Republic
- Methods: Demonstrations; Strikes; Civil disobedience Riots; Roadblocks and Barricades
- Result: Protests spilled over into the larger Mahsa Amini protests; Police brutality; Continued growth of the Iranian Democracy Movement

Parties
| Iranian protesters (Pahlavi Iran) Pro Imperial State | (Iran) Islamic Republic; Police Command; Special Units Command; Islamic Revolutionary Guard Corps; Basij; Army; Popular Mobilization Forces; Hezbollah |

Lead figures
| No centralised leadership Reza Pahlavi | Ali Khamenei; Ebrahim Raisi; Hassan Rouhani; Ahmad Vahidi; Abdolreza Fazli; Hossein Ashtari |

Casualties
- Deaths: 11+ (5 confirmed): 10 protesters; 2 police
- Injuries: 100+

Protests erupted in Iran on 15 July 2021 over water shortages, but were quickly met with police violence and brutality. November 2021 saw further protests due to water shortages; various other protests and strikes also took place due to the worsening economic situation. In August 2021, Amnesty International noted that brutal forces have been used by the Security Forces to oppress the protesters.

== Late 2020 and early 2021 ==
A nonviolent three-day strike campaign was launched by toll workers in Ghazvin against employment statuses, meaning high unemployment. On 14 February 2021, nationwide protests erupted in protest against an insufficient pension for retirees, fueled by inflation rates reaching 45%, demanding justice over the deaths of 1500 during the 2019–2020 Iranian protests and an end to poverty. Iran's Stock Market Exchange bubble finally burst on 24 January. As a result, many people lost investments, so there were large protests in Tehran where police fired on protesters. On 7 February, the Iranian media warned of another uprising after major protests in February.

Between December and January, thousands of stock owners and stock marketers took to the streets in protest against the stock crash in Iran. Kohgiluyeh County saw protests in January, demonstrating against water crisis and polluted water, calling for the government to take action over the crisis. These deprived workers spread their empty tablecloths on the street. Contract workers in Ilam and Tehran led large rallies over uncertainty of their employment status (around 13,000 went on strike). The employees and retirees taking to the streets in December held rallies over the crisis in the country, mainly in Ahvaz, where major gatherings have been held since November, protesting nonpayments and low wages. Thousands of ranchers, livestock workers and university students held rallies over unequal society, calling for president Hassan Rouhani to listen to their demands. Hundreds of school teachers, nurses and contact health workers held marches in Tehran over unequal job status and employment issues, with demands for authorities to clarify their employment status. Drivers of fuel tankers led ten days of labour protests in November–December, to protest low fares and demand higher fares in Arak and Kermanshah. Workers in Ahvaz and restaurant workers and shop owners protested humidity and conditions during work period, inspiring thousands of other worker groups across the country to protest in strike action, starting on 26 November and ending on 1 December. Poultry farmers and municipality workers led protests as well as retired workers in Khuzestan. Hundreds of academic staff and faculty members in Mahshahr took to the streets to embrace the same demands of the protesters in other cities. Protests by bus drivers, truckers unions, landowners, sugarcane workers, cargo workers, farmers took to the streets in Shush (over the lack of job security and privatisation of sugarcane worker factories), Isfahan (where farmers protested irrigation water rights), protesting their harsh living conditions and more depriving issues these groups are facing.

Thousands of retirees staged rallies in multiple cities, including Tehran, Mashhad, Hamadan, Khorramabad, Karaj, Shush, Rasht, Shiraz, Qazvin, and Kermanshah on 10 January to express their frustrating dissatisfaction with low access to their rights and demanding their basic rights.

The current and recent wave of retiree protests began on 13 December when hundreds of protests and retirees launched nationwide general strikes and countrywide popular demonstrations against inflation and unemployment while economic turmoil and hardships adjusting to pensions also triggered the controversy, ongoing political demonstrations by retirees. Multiple cities saw protests, including Tehran, Tabriz, Mashhad, Isfahan, Rasht, Yazd, Bojnurd, Khorramabad, Ilam, Ahvaz and Arak. The protests on 13 December, 20 December, 27 December and 3 January were peaceful and non-violent. Fars, Kurdistan, Alborz, Qazvin, Razavi Khorasan, East Azerbaijan, Hamadan, Lorestan, Isfahan, Kermanshah, and Khuzestan provinces also saw protests and demonstrations by retirees. They also held protests in Neyshabur, Haft-Tappeh, Qom, Shush Danial and Arak over economic conditions and ruined livelihoods. Pensioners, medical staff, employees, workers, and firefighters held protests for weeks in December and January complaining about overdue wages.

== Protests ==
=== January 2021 ===
Iranians continued their protests and angry demonstrations on 26 January amid repression from the security forces. The protest movement was launched on 3 January, when hundreds of sectors took to the streets for the biggest second wave of protests since September, the first in 2021. Retirees and pensioners demonstrated on 26 January in protest at inadequate pensions and worsening conditions and demanded officials return their savings and pensions. Cities like Ahvaz, Shush, Karaj, Tabriz expressed their anger, dissatisfaction with unemployment, social problems and inequality among working citizens and in these cities, retirees protested officials' failure to pay their inherent rights. In Kermanshah, pensioners protesting low salaries and pensions staged rallies in front of government buildings, the third retiree gathering in the city, while in Ilam, protesters organised their third week of demonstrations and gatherings calling for higher salaries and improvements of poor living conditions. In Qazvin, Sari, Mashhad, Khorramshahr, Khorramabad, Bojnurd, Shiraz, Rasht and Sanandaj, mass street protests occurred as well, rallying against plundering policies, calling for officials respect their basic rights, officials' indifference toward their dilemmas and dire living conditions, officials' failure to pay pensioners' rights, regime's indifference, Retirees' salaries do not fit with their expenditures, government did not balance their salaries and many more depriving issues. The precedented wave of fruitful mass street protests and opposition-led growing popular striking demonstrations occurred in larger numbers this week than the last four weeks. This straw of protests has sparked fears among newspapers and controversy among the media, who have warned the explosive and impatient people of Iran might rise up against president Hassan Rouhani.

=== February 2021 ===
On 15 February, widespread unrest and severe nonviolent protests and social movement intensified throughout the country.

In Baluchistan, the 2021 Sistan and Baluchestan protests broke out, leaving as many as 10 killed. Rallies, street demonstrations and protest marches has risen since 3 February 2021, when hundreds protested in Isfahan against polluted water. In Shiraz, pensioners rallied for weeks, protesting for larger pensions and calling for new wage increases. The uprising in the Sistan And Baluchistan region has left 50 killed and wounded. Protesters rallied again over the recent days, protesting in Mashhad against retirees conditions and working life for mall employees, and simultaneously, retiree-protesters rallied for their sixth consecutive week in protest against pension law system and social security.

Rallies were held in Tehran, Izeh and Saveh by unemployed workers, workers, farmers over water conditions, low wages and no payment-received, and more deep issues. Hundreds have taken to the streets daily in Tehran in front of shopping malls and teachers held strikes and sit-ins publicly in-front of preschools, protesting overdue complaints and not receiving their rights in work. Up to 1,000–5,000 participated in protests since the January protests.

Protesters took to the streets of Tehran, Mashhad, Tabriz, Karaj and Ahvaz to express their anger over economic woes and worsening tensions in the country, in protest against the economy. It is the 4th straight week of pensioner protests against low pensioners wages and calling for higher pensions, while retirees have been protesting social security. Protests called for the government to take action and set higher wages for pensioners and retirees, demonstrating for months. The participants of the January–February strike wave was mainly municipality workers, pensioners, retirees, teachers, unemployed or fired workers, railroad workers, petrochemical workers, gas workers, factory workers, miners and manufacturers in Urmia, Mahshahr, Arak, Kerman and more. Teachers, defrauded creditors, other sectors and farmers conducted gatherings in Tehran, Mashhad, Zahedan and Isfahan as well, protesting unpaid wages and demands for their wages grew louder.

Nationwide protests by workers, factory employees and farmers against the plan for higher prices ahead of Nowruz and non-payments. The farmers from Hashtbandi in Hormozgan province went on strike as well as Isfahan, Nurabad and other areas across the country to protest the prices of their products and no wage payments. College students, preschool educators, impoverished citizens, paint workers, bakery workers, and railroad workers of the maintenance sector took to the streets during the string of mass protests, protesting poor conditions and living standards in Iran. Thousands of workers, shopkeepers, steel retirees, drivers, farmers, security staff, residents, water and sewage staff, and bakers rallied in Iran for weeks during the two-week long strike campaign in February in support of the protesting farmers and calling for president Hassan Rouhani to resign.

=== March 2021 ===
In Tehran, three protesters were arrested for protesting in the peaceful meetings and nonviolent gatherings, triggering nationwide pensioner protests and widespread demonstrations in Karaj, Arak, Khorramabad, Ahvaz, Isfahan and Shiraz.

On 22 February, retirees staged mass protests across Tehran, Karaj, Tabriz, Isfahan, Shiraz, Ahvaz as part of the weekly retirees strikes and pensioner protests over inflation and economic hardships. Since 3 January, mass protests have rocked nationwide and cities have been gripped with dissent and overflowing demonstrations over inflation and unemployment. Mashhad, Isfahan, Arak, Qazvin, Khorramabad was seen to have experienced protest rallies and street marches in dissatisfaction over adjusting to harsh pensions and poor living conditions for workers.

On 14–17 March, protests by retirees and other sectors across Iran, Urmia and other areas, which was gripped with dissent weekly by pensioners and retirees, was held in protest at rising inflation, demanding their pensions adjusted with the rising inflation rate and the skyrocketing prices. They also protested their long-delayed pensions. Protesters and large crowds gathered nationwide despite police presence calling, chanting and clapping angry slogans calling for the government to adjust their pensions and calling for the government or Hassan Rouhani to resign on the eve of Nowruz. The ongoing protests and anti-establishment demonstrations are worrying for the government ahead of the 2021 Iranian presidential election.

Traditional dairy farmers protested the lack of support on their farming industry from the irrelevant authorities, employees in electricity distribution centres in Tehran demanding their rights, workers in municipalities and buildings in Behbahan staged rallies demanding their wages and protesting poor living conditions, sit-ins by these worker staging rallies was held immediately as well across the country, oil industry retirees in Ahvaz demonstrated calling for better support from the authorities and demanding their worker rights chanting, "We will not relent until we get our rights back.", the protest marches and popular demonstrations, frequent and fruitful mass rallies by workers in the major Fars metal companies continued for their 5th week over the non-fulfillment of the employer's obligations.

In Northeastern Iran, hundreds of protesters clashed with security forces and thousands took part in demonstrations over two days protesting the rape of an eight-year old and seven-year-old girl. Protesters broke cars and shouted slogans, at police chasing and fleeing rock throwing protesters in Gonbad Kavuz.

On 29 March, protests erupted across Iran as protesters take to the streets in Many cities like Tehran, Isfahan, Karaj, and Gilan to protest a trade cooperation act with China for 25 years. Tehran, Kazeroun, Kermanshah, Karaj has seen daily protest gatherings over a new pact with China, heavy security forces presence was reported. Protesters also held rallies in front of governorships in the Alborz and Isfahan provinces to voice "outrage" over the "controversial" pact.

=== April 2021 ===
On 4 April, pensioners and retirees held rallies across the country, protesting their poor economic conditions and pension reform to the system, making it harder to adjust to. The protesters held rallies and non-violent marches in Tehran, Arak, Ardabil, Isfahan, Ahvaz, Ilam, Khorramabad, Rasht, Sari, Sanandaj, Shiraz, Karaj, Kerman, Kermanshah, Gorgan, Qazvin, Mashhad, Yazd, Neyshabur, Shush, Shooshtar, and Abhar. Demonstrations erupted nationwide after security forces intimidated demonstrators particularly in strikes and marches.

On 14 April, retirees and pensioners held nationwide protests and demonstrations calling for the boycott of the upcoming sham presidential elections over the insufficient pensions they have received. The gatherings took place in Tehran, Karaj, Khorramabad, Arak, Mashhad, Neyshabur, Kerman, Yazd, Qazvin, Kermanshah, Tabriz, Ahvaz, Bojnurd, Rasht, Behshahr, Shush, Shushtar, Boroujerd, Isfahan, Maku, and Shahroud.

On 25 April, water system workers launched sit-ins and protests alongside the Zayanderud river, the largest river of the Iranian Plateau, to protest the deaths of thousands of fish every year.

=== July 2021 ===
Protests broke out on 15 July in Khuzestan due to worsening water shortages during the summer and spread across the country in the following days.

=== September 2021 ===
From 6–7 September, massive rallies protested the bad economic situation in Iran.

=== November 2021 ===
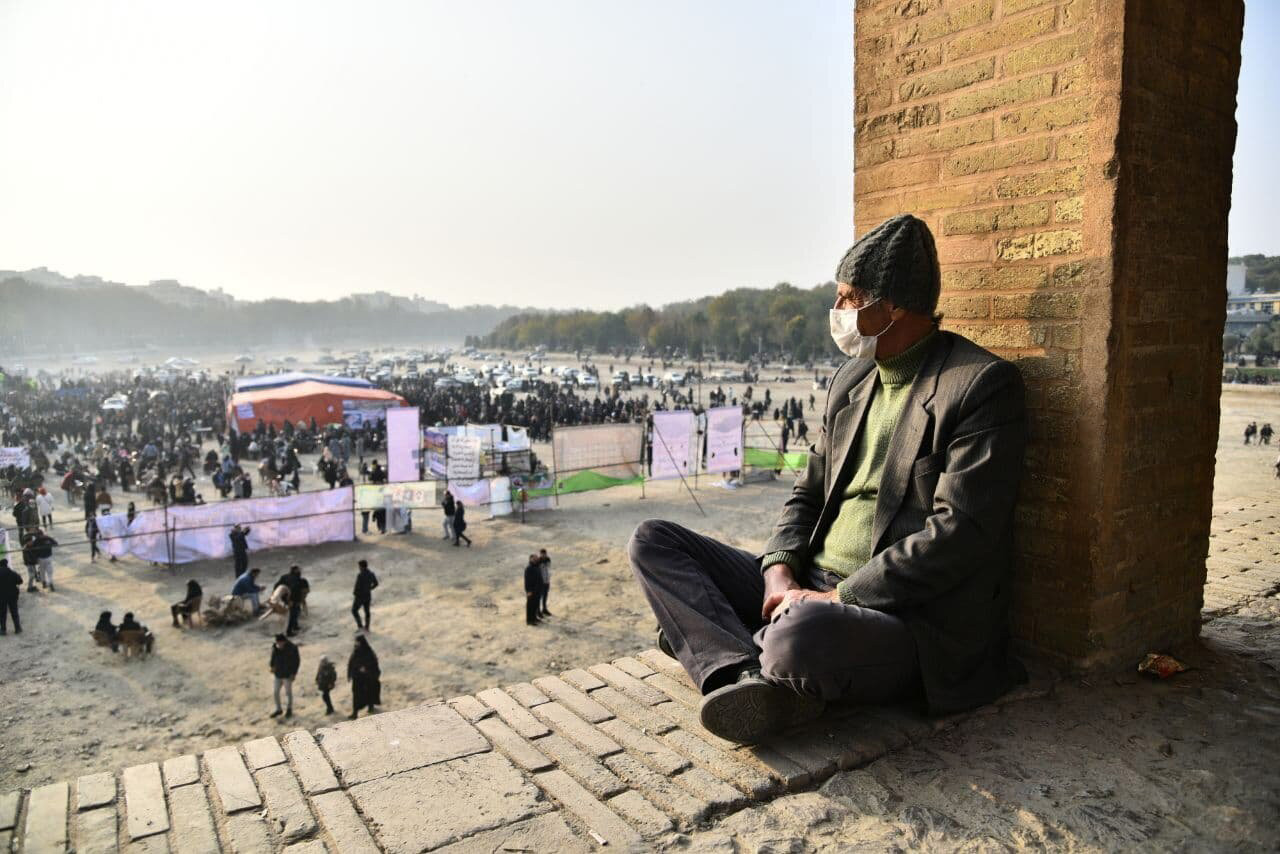
Isfahan protests Nov. 2021

From November 9–27 crowds of 2,000-3,000 Iranians in Isfahan gathered to hold demonstrations against water shortages, which increasingly grew violent over time. On November 27, the Islamic Republic employed large numbers of riot police, arrested at least 67 protesters, and repressed the protests.

=== February 2022 ===
On February 1, 2022, thousands of teachers across the country performed a one-day strike after three consecutive days of protests. The next day, a policeman was stabbed to death by an unknown attacker. Military officer Hossein Ashtari proposed a new law that would make it easier for police officers to use firearms, prompting worries that such a practice could provide a license to police brutality against civilians.

=== 2022 food protests ===
Protests in Iran broke out in early May after a hike in wheat prices.

== See also ==
- Mahsa Amini protests
- 2011 Khuzestan protests
- 2018 Khuzestan protests
- 2018 Iranian water protests
- 2019–2020 Iranian protests
- Eye injuries during 2022 Iranian protests
- Happiness campaign in Iran
