= Environmental issues in Iran =

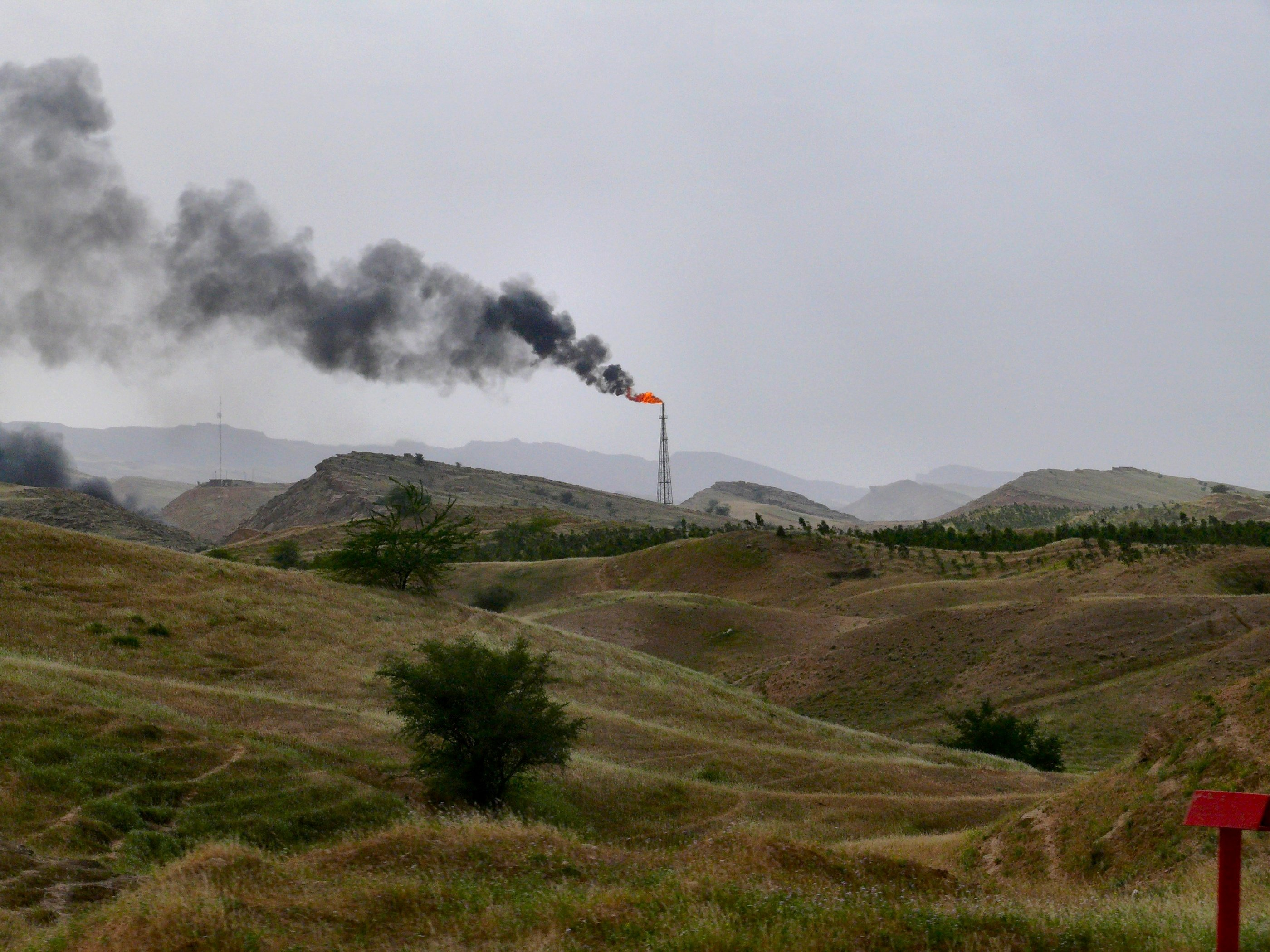
80% of air pollution in Tehran is due to cars; the remaining 20% is due to factories and industry emissions.

Iran is one of the world's largest and most densely populated countries, spanning an area of approximately 1.7 million sq. km and a population of 91.5 million. Since 1966 Iran has experienced immense population growth, initially being recorded at 25,781,090 people, and totaling to 75,330,000 in 2010. The various climates, increased population growth, heavy reliance on fossil fuels, and refusal to commit to sustainability goals has extenuated Iran's vulnerability to ecological crisis and climate change.

Environmental issues in Iran include, especially in urban areas, vehicle emissions, refinery operations, and industrial effluents which contribute to poor air quality. A report by the United Nations Environment Programme ranked Iran at 117th place among 133 countries in terms of environmental indexes. Water scarcity is also a concern since the increased temperatures and fluctuating precipitation levels associated with global warming can result in droughts or flooding that will further degrade the water availability.

== Air pollution ==
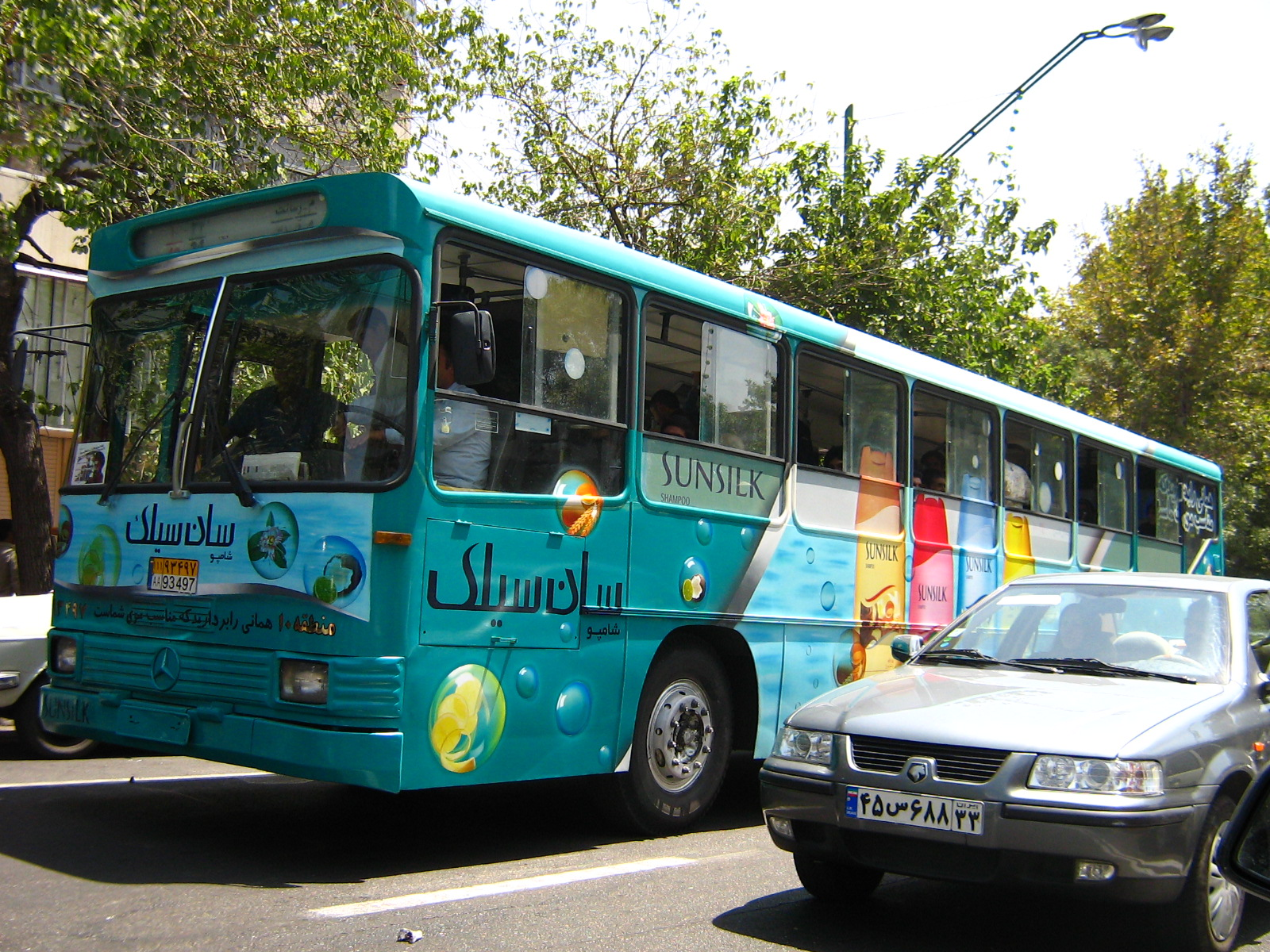
Car vs public transport in Tehran

The World Bank estimates losses inflicted on Iran's economy as a result of deaths caused by air pollution at $640 million, which is equal to 5.1 trillion rials or 0.57 percent of GDP. Diseases resulting from air pollution are inflicting losses estimated at $260 million per year or 2.1 trillion rials or 0.23 percent of the GDP on Iran's economy.

Most cars use leaded gasoline and lack emissions control equipment. Tehran is rated as one of the world's most polluted cities. However, buses and cars running on natural gas are planned to replace the existing public transportation fleet in the future. Also, energy prices are kept artificially low in Iran through heavy state subsidies, resulting in highly inefficient and polluting consumption patterns. Traffic management, vehicle inspection, general use of electric bicycles and electronic government are also part of the solution.

A rising incidence of respiratory illnesses prompted the city governments of Tehran and Arak, southwest of the capital, to institute air pollution control programs. These programs aim to reduce gradually the amount of harmful chemicals released into the atmosphere.

== Climate change ==
Iran is party to the Kyoto Protocol on climate change but not its Doha Amendment. It has signed but not ratified the Paris Agreement on climate change.

== Ecosystems ==
Much of Iran's territory suffers from overgrazing, desertification and or deforestation.

Wetlands and bodies of fresh water increasingly are being destroyed as industry and agriculture expand, and oil and chemical spills have harmed aquatic life in the Persian Gulf and the Caspian Sea. Iran contends that the international rush to develop oil and gas reserves in the Caspian Sea presents that region with a new set of environmental threats. Although a Department of Environment has existed since 1971, Iran has not yet developed a policy of sustainable development because short-term economic goals have taken precedence.

Signed, but not ratified: Environmental Modification, Law of the Sea, Marine Life Conservation.

== Deforestation ==
Iran had a 2018 Forest Landscape Integrity Index mean score of 7.67/10, ranking it 34th globally out of 172 countries.

== Natural disasters ==
Iran experiences periodic droughts, floods, dust storms, sandstorms and earthquakes along western border and in the northeast.

== Soil erosion ==
Iran ranked worst in the world for soil erosion in 2011, with reports from 2017 indicating that the erosion rate in the country is 2.5 times the world average.

== Waste ==
An estimated 50,000 tons of trash is produced in the country every day of which something between 70 and 80 percent is disposed of hygienically but the rest is not. Iran produces over 8 million tons of hazardous waste annually (2016).

== Water ==
Industrial and urban wastewater runoff has contaminated rivers, coastal and underground waters.

=== Water scarcity ===
In Iran, water scarcity is caused by high climatic variability, uneven distribution of water, over exploitation of available water resources, and prioritization of economic development. It is further exacerbated by climate change.

== See also ==
- Automotive industry in Iran
- Clean Air Law of Iran
- Department of Environment (Iran)
- Economy of Iran
- Energy in Iran
- Environmental issues in Tehran
- Geography of Iran
- International rankings of Iran
- Iranian Economic Reform Plan
- Natural Resources and Watershed Management Organization
- Wildlife of Iran
