= 2018 Iranian water protests =

Series of protests in Iran

- Part of the 2018 Iranian protests and the water crisis in Iran
- Date: February 2018 – November 2018
- Location: Abadan, Ahvaz, Bandar-e Emam Khomeyni, Borazjan, Isfahan, Kamarej, Khorramshahr, Mahshahr, Varzaneh
- Caused by: Lack of clean water
- Methods: Demonstrations, riots
- Result: Protests quelled; Water crisis in Iran persisted

Number
Several thousand protesters	Unknown

Casualties
- Death: At least 2 protesters
- Injuries: 11+ protesters 10 security forces
- Arrested: Approximately 170 protesters

The 2018 Iranian water protests were a series of protests in Iran involving demands for improvements in the provision of freshwater. The protests erupted after a period of severe drought in the country. Participants accused the Iranian authorities of water mismanagement, worsening the impact of the drought. The protests coincided with a series of larger protests and civil unrest in Iran.

Public demonstrations involving water demands in 2018 were first reported in mid-February. The first significant protests occurred in early March in the Isfahan province and later spread to the provinces of Khuzestan and Bushehr. The government responded by quelling the protests, leading to the deaths of at least two protesters and multiple injuries. Approximately 170 people were reportedly arrested in relation to the water demonstrations. The water shortages persisted and water protests erupted again in 2021.

== Background ==
=== Freshwater shortages ===
Many Iranian regions saw a shortage in freshwater in 2018, reporting issues such as water salinity and drinking water outages. Several factors have contributed to the water situation in Iran. In the years prior to the water protests, Iran had already been facing diminishing rainfall, warmer temperatures and frequent droughts. These trends have been attributed to climate change, which have increased water scarcity in the country. Furthermore, in the decades leading up to the 2018 water shortages, water demand had been increasing due to population growth, urbanisation and the decreasing efficiency of the water-reliant agricultural sector.

On top of that, Iran was experiencing a severe drought in 2018. According to a report by the Tehran-based Financial Tribune, the amount of rainfall decreased significantly between September and December 2017, reaching its lowest level in the past 67 years. In comparison to the long-term average, the decline in rainfall levels was more than 50%. A 2018 report by the Food and Agriculture Organization stated that "Iran has experienced its most prolonged, extensive and severe drought in over 30 years." The Iran Meteorological Organization estimated that 97% of the country faced some form of drought in 2018. Rainfall is the main source of water in Iran.

However, the primary cause for the water situation in Iran is generally considered to be structural water mismanagement by the government. According to experts, the government's pursuit of unconstrained development, focusing on immediate economic benefits rather than long-term ecological effects, has been the most important issue. Other aspects include Iran's water governance structure, the unstable political climate, and disintegration with other policy areas. The consequences have been a consistent overuse of water resources, outdated irrigation systems, water pollution, and the uneven distribution of dams. These factors have contributed to depletion of the natural water supply.

Protesters similarly blamed the water shortages on government mismanagement. Many in the agricultural regions complained about government projects that diverted water to more populated areas. Some protesters also accused the government of transferring freshwater supplies to nearby countries, such as Kuwait and Iraq.

To a lesser extent, other factors have also influenced the lack of access to water resources. These include national and international political tensions and instability, economic performance and instability, and international sanctions. In this regard, the US withdrawal from the 2015 nuclear accord has been a significant factor.

=== Previous water protests ===
In the decade prior to the 2018 Iranian water protests, there had been a number of water-related protests in different parts of the country. In 2010, there were reports of violent protests over Lake Urmia. Similarly, in 2011, several thousand activists and demonstrators gathered in several cities in the Azerbaijani region to protest the degradation of the lake. More than 300 demonstrators were arrested in Orumiyeh, after clashes with police forces, according to local activists.

In 2012, farmers protested in Varzaneh in the Isfahan Province over a water pipe that transports water from Isfahan to the neighbouring Yazd province. The protesters clashed with riot police and the pipeline was damaged. Furthermore, demonstrations took place in 2013 to protest a major water transfer project in the provinces of Khuzestan and Chaharmahal and Bakhtiari, and in front of the parliament building in Tehran. In some instances, human chains were formed as a means of protest. In the same year, a group of farmers staged a demonstration against the drying up of the Zayanderud River. A similar, larger protest was held in 2014, when thousands of residents gathered near the river.

During a street protest in 2016 against water transfer projects in Chaharmahal and Bakhtiari, one protester was reportedly killed and many were injured or arrested. In February 2017, two days of demonstrations took place in the Khuzestan province to protest against air pollution, water shortages, and power cuts.

=== Connection to larger 2018 protests ===
The water protests of 2018 occurred in the context of a larger series of protests in Iran. In December 2017 and January 2018, nationwide protests erupted, stemming from anger over high prices and alleged corruption. In the remainder of the year, thousands of demonstrations followed, aimed at poor socio-economic and political conditions. Although in most instances protestors did not explicitly voice their discontent over water-related issues, according to analysts, a lack of access to water contributed to the outbreak of these protests, especially in rural areas.

== Timeline ==
=== February ===
According to the Armed Conflict Location and Event Data Project, small groups of demonstrators started protesting water shortages in mid-February. The protests primarily took place in the central-western regions of Iran and were aimed against drought conditions and a provincial water redistribution plan proposed by the government.

=== 9–18 March ===
The first significant demonstration revolving around water-related issues in 2018 occurred in early March. In Varzaneh, near the city of Isfahan, dozens of farmers protested against provincial water redistribution. One of the key demands was the removal of a pipeline that diverts water from the Isfahan region to the Yazd Province. According to online videos, the protesters chanted mockingly "Death to farmers, long live oppressors!". On 9 March, tensions escalated when a similar protest was held. Hundreds or possibly thousands of protesters marched towards water transfer facilities with the alleged intent of destroying a pipeline. Farmers clashed with riot police on motorcycles and a local protester claimed that tear gas was fired. On 18 March, Varzaneh farmers invaded a Friday prayer ceremony to protest the water situation.

=== 28–29 March ===
In Ahvaz, in the Khuzestan Province, protesters called for an end to regional water transfer projects in late March. Initially, protests erupted on 28 March over the depiction of the local Arab community in a commercial on national television, sparking anger among the Arab population over perceived suppression and discrimination in the region. A day later, the demonstrations grew, with thousands more attending, while demands began to include environmental issues. In light of discontent over local damming and river diversion programmes also linked to the marginalisation of local communities, slogans reportedly included "Stop destroying Ahvaz’ environment!" and "End water theft in Ahvaz!". The protests have been referred to as “the Uprising of Dignity."

=== 7–17 April ===
On 7 April, farmers from the eastern part of the Isfahan Province demonstrated near the historic Khaju Bridge in the city centre of Isfahan. Similar to the early March demonstrations, the farmers protested against water diversion to the Yazd Province. In video footage, the protesters are seen to chant slogans, while security forces try to intervene. On 9 April, farmers were involved in skirmishes with police forces in Isfahan two days later, as they again protested water distribution policies. Protests continued during the following two days, primarily in Khvorasgan, the city's eastern district. Up to 15 farmers were arrested after clashes with riot police on 11 April. On 13 and 14 April, after similar confrontations, 2 people were injured and up to 30 protesters arrested.

In the same period, two events involving farmers from the same region took place in and around Varzaneh. On 14 April, a group of farmers severely damaged power poles in the city, causing a disruption in the water diversion system. Part of a water transfer network was also destroyed by farmers near Varzaneh on 17 April.

=== 20 June–23 June ===
On 20 June, people in Abadan, a city in the southern part of the Khuzestan province, gathered in front of the water and sewage system offices and protested undrinkable water and water rationing. Other frustrations were the hours-long daily disruption in the water provision and the need to wait in long lines to obtain potable water. A day before the protests, the water and sewage department in Abadan had declared that water would be rationed as water pressure dropped significantly and high levels of salinity were discovered in the city's water system. Three days later, hundreds of people in Abadan again demonstrated against the lack of clean water in front of the governor's office. The protesters chanted slogans against the governor and authorities responsible for the city's supply of water.

=== 29 June–2 July ===
Protests broke out in Khorromshahr, a city near Abadan, on 29 June against the water situation. Hundreds of people accused the Iranian authorities of water mismanagement leading to saline and polluted water. Residents also blamed the government of transferring water supplies to Kuwait and Iraq. A few weeks earlier, a video of a pipeline allegedly transferring freshwater toward the Iraqi border had spread among locals. In video footage of the demonstration, dozens of protesters are seen confronting the city's governor.

The protests turned violent the next day, as hundreds of demonstrators again gathered to protest water shortages. The demonstration started peaceful as participants chanted slogans against the authorities. Late into the evening and early into the morning of 1 July, protesters began throwing rocks and waste toward security forces, while police fired tear gas at the crowds. Shots could be heard on unverified videos that circulated on social media, and according to state television, several protesters carried firearms, while videos appeared to show police opening fire on demonstrators. At least one protester was reportedly killed. Officials have refuted claims about the killing of protesters but stated that 11 were wounded.

In response to the violent crackdown in Khorramshahr the previous day, thousands of people took to the streets in support of the protests in several places near Khorromshahr. Videos on social media showed protests in Ahvaz, Mahshahr, and Bandar-e Emam Khomeyni.

On 2 July, a crowd in Abadan clashed with police forces during a protest against poor water quality. Protesters threw objects and engaged in vandalism according to state media, after which security forces dispersed the crowd.

=== 7–8 July ===
A major protest broke out in Borazjan in the Bushehr province on 7 July against local water shortages and the disorderly distribution of freshwater. Thousands of demonstrators gathered in the city's main square and chanted slogans against local authorities, accusing them of incompetence, water mismanagement, and corruption. According to a local news source, the city's water pipes had not delivered water for more than ten days. A local activist reported that the water shortages are partly due to illegal irrigation projects near Kazerun, further up-stream from the local river. Borazjan's Deputy Governor and the Friday Prayer leader tried to address the crowd, but angered protesters eventually caused them to flee, despite the presence of hundreds of security forces. On 8 July, Borazjan entered a second day of water protests. State-affiliated media reported that 350 people participated in demonstrations in the city centre.

=== 13 July ===
In Kamarej, a village near Kazerun located in the Fars province, farmers gathered to protest local water scarcity. According to state media, the protests were triggered by a decision to remove illegal water pumps from the local river. The use of these water pumps reportedly contributed to the July 7 and 8 protests in Borazjan. In clashes between the farmers and police forces, one protester was killed and many more were injured, including several police officers.

=== September–November ===
Between September and November 2018, farmers from the Isfahan province staged a protest for more than 40 consecutive days. The protesters camped out in cities and villages near the Zayanderud River, placing tractors in front of their tents. Similar to earlier protests by Isfahan farmers in early March and mid-April, the participants accused the government of water mismanagement and complained about water diversion to the Yazd province. On 31 October, a convoy of 1,500 vehicles visited the upper reaches of the river and a pumping station as a means of protest.

== Government response ==
The water protests were met with suppression by the government. In July 2018, Iranian Interior Minister Abdolreza Rahmani Fazli indicated that Iran intends "to bring these protests to an end as soon as possible with restraint from police and the cooperation of authorities, but if the opposite happens, the judiciary and law enforcement forces will carry out their duties.” In multiple instances, riot police dispersed the crowds with tear gas. Gunfire was also reported on two occasions, with at least two protesters killed and many injured. Security forces arrested up to 45 demonstrators during the protests, while more than 125 local activists have been arrested after water protests in April according to a local human rights organisation.

In response to allegations of water mismanagement, state officials acknowledged that outdated agricultural and irrigation systems and inadequate water management policies in the three decades prior to the 2018 water shortages have contributed to the water situation in the country. However, the government has denied claims about selling and transferring water to neighbouring countries. In explaining the 2018 water shortages, Iranian leaders have predominantly pointed to conflicting water management policies of neighbouring countries and a lack of rainfall.

In some instances, local officials promised improvements in the provision and quality of freshwater within a couple of weeks. On 1 July 2018, Khorramshahr's Water Authority Chief claimed that the water quality had improved, asserting that “Khorramshahr has left the water crisis behind."

== International reactions ==
In reaction to the protests throughout Iran, former US Secretary of State Mike Pompeo said that the demonstrations "show that the Iranian people are deeply frustrated with their own government’s failures. (...) Government mismanagement of Iran’s natural resources has led to severe droughts and other environmental crises as well."

On 6 July 2018, after reports about violent clashes between protesters and police forces on 31 June and 1 July in Khorramshahr, Amnesty International issued a public statement. The NGO stated that "Iranian authorities must carry out an impartial and thorough investigation into reports that security forces used unnecessary and excessive force, possibly including firearms, against generally peaceful protesters during recent protests in Khuzestan province, where people have been demanding clean and safe drinking water (...). They should ensure that all detainees are protected from torture and other ill-treatment and that any held solely for peacefully exercising their right to assembly are released."

== Aftermath ==
Freshwater problems in Iran persisted in the subsequent years, with reports of a lack of potable water and water pollution in certain regions. In 2021, a large wave of water-related protests erupted again.

== See also ==
- 2018 protests in Iran
- 2018 Iranian protest movement
- 2017–2018 Iranian protests
- 2018–2019 Iranian general strikes and protests
- 2021 Iranian water protests
- Water scarcity in Iran
