= 2025 Iran water crisis protests =

2025 Iran water crisis

- Part of Protests in Iran
- Date: May–August 2025
- Location: Various cities in Iran
- Caused by: Water shortages, electricity blackouts, government mismanagement
- Goals: Access to water and electricity, government accountability
- Methods: Demonstrations, sit-ins, protest marches
- Status: Ongoing

The 2025 Iran water crisis refers to a sharp worsening of the country's long-standing water management problems, which reached critical levels by mid-2025 (Solar Hijri 1404). Residents in many parts of the country particularly marginalized communities have faced acute water shortages, with some areas experiencing water outages lasting up to three consecutive days. Combined with an extreme heatwave, the crisis has sparked widespread protests, beginning with student-led demonstrations in May and continuing into July and August, with slogans such as "Water, electricity, life – our basic right."

== Background ==
Water crisis protests, 2022

Iran has faced growing challenges related to water scarcity and mismanagement over the past decades. These include excessive demand, shrinking groundwater reserves, declining water quality, and ecological degradation. While Iranian authorities attribute the crisis to climate change, recurrent droughts, and international sanctions, many experts highlight decades of fragmented planning and shortsighted policies as the root causes.

The centralized management paradigm, focusing more on symptom relief than structural reform, has left the country vulnerable. Three key drivers include: rapid population growth and poor spatial distribution, inefficient agricultural practices, and misgovernance driven by unsustainable development ambitions.

In July 2025, Dr. Banafshah Zahraei, a professor of water resources management at the University of Tehran, warned that Iran was approaching a "doomsday scenario." She stated that without urgent action, the country could run out of drinkable water in a matter of weeks.

In the first months of 1404 (2025–2026), the water crisis in Iran intensified, and its impact on Iranian residents, especially in underprivileged areas, has grown significantly. Today, many Iranians are facing severe water shortages, to the point that in numerous places almost no water flows from the taps.

== Protests ==
=== May ===
The widespread water shortages and rolling blackouts triggered mass demonstrations beginning in early May, initially led by university students. These were soon joined by truck drivers, bakers, farmers, retirees, and other social groups. What began as protests over basic necessities rapidly evolved into broader demands for systemic change and the end of theocratic rule.

At university dormitories in Shiraz, Ahvaz, and Tabriz, students faced unsanitary conditions and had to study by candlelight. The protests began at Shahid Beheshti University on 3 May, where slogans such as "Students may die but will never surrender!" echoed previous uprisings. As water and electricity outages crippled campuses, students organized sit-ins and rallies, denouncing the militarization of universities and government failure to provide basic services.

=== July ===
By July, the water crisis had deepened. In some neighborhoods, residents went without running water for three consecutive days amid scorching heat. On 20 and 21 July, hundreds gathered outside the governor's office in Sabzevar, protesting power and water outages.

A protester stated: "In over 40-degree heat, we have no water or electricity. We have children, we have the sick, and yet no one seems to hear us." The people of Sabzevar took to the streets for the second consecutive night on Tuesday, July 21, chanting slogans such as “Dishonorable, dishonorable,” “We don’t want an incompetent official,” and “Don’t be afraid, don’t be afraid, we are all together.”

=== August ===
On 4 August, residents of Khoshkbijar in Gilan province staged a protest against frequent and prolonged outages. Demonstrators carried signs and chanted slogans such as "Water, electricity, life – our basic right," "We don’t want incompetent officials," and "Death to inefficiency."

On August 14, the people of Ramhormoz protested against the plan to transfer water from the source of the Alaa River to Kohgiluyeh and blocked the road during the protest rally.

On August 15, bazaaris and citizens of Babolsar gathered in front of the city's governor's building to protest frequent power, water, and internet outages.

On August 20, thousands of people in Shiraz demonstrated in front of the Fars provincial government building to protest repeated power and water cuts. Protesters chanted slogans including “Death to the dictator,” “Water, electricity, life are our inalienable rights,” “Freedom, freedom, freedom,” and “We will fight, we will die, we will take back Iran.”

== Slogans ==
- "No electricity, no water – governor, are you asleep?"
- "Don’t be afraid, don’t be afraid – we are all together."
- "Water, electricity, life – our basic right."
- "Incompetent officials must resign!"
- "Our rights can only be won on the streets."
- "No electricity, no water – the governor is asleep."

== See also ==
- Water crisis in Iran
- Environmental issues in Iran
- 2021 Iranian water protests
- Water scarcity in Iran
