= Air pollution and traffic congestion in Tehran =

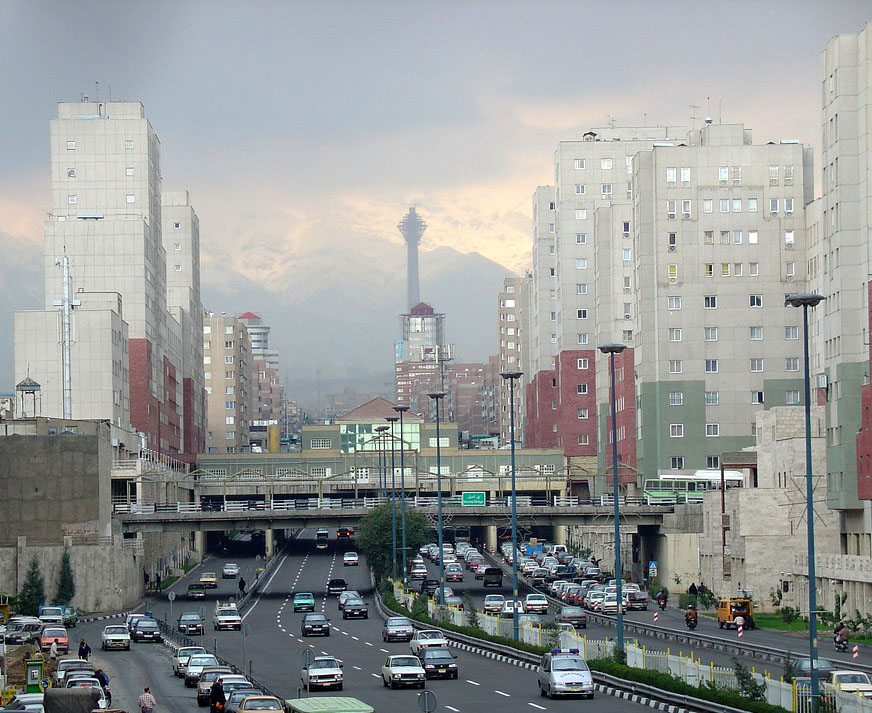
Air pollution in Tehran

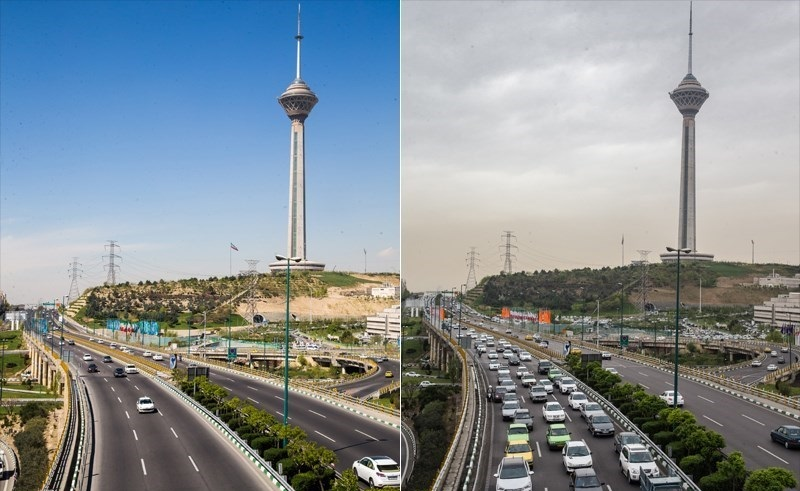
The left image shows Tehran in a day-off during Norouz vacations while the right is Tehran in a busy working day.

Tehran, the Iranian capital, suffers from air pollution and severe massive traffic congestion in rush hours.

Tehran is a city that gets busier and busier during the day and people flock to work from nearby cities and towns. As stated in a 2018 World Bank study, rapid population growth due to continuous migration, growing industrialization and high traffic have added to the pollution problems of the Iranian capital.

Tehran is also rated as one of the most polluted cities in the globe. Parts of the city are often covered by smog especially in winter time, causing widespread pulmonary illnesses. It is estimated that about 27 people die each day from pollution-related diseases.

Tehran, the largest city in West Asia with a population of 14 million, has less than 100 sunny days a year. This is particularly problematic for the economic heart of the country. Traffic congestion, lack of rainfall aggravates this problem. However, it is believed that the bad weather is not the main reason, but only other stressors such as the population of the capital and also the number of cars are increasing at a very high speed. Another general problem in Iran is inadequate road and street infrastructure, severe lack of public transportation, and lack of effective and appropriate urban planners.

== The amount and causes of pollution in Tehran ==
In 2019, the average of 25.9 micro grams per cubic meter placed Tehran in the 582nd place among all the polluted cities in the world, and Iran ranked 27th among all the countries in the world. One of the main reasons for pollution is the use of old vehicles with low quality fuels. Because the fuel produced in Iran has a lower quality than most international fuels. The World Health Organization (WHO) had in 2018 put Tehran in the category of ‘most polluted cities in the world,’ while the World Bank in its 2018 report said this city accounts for 4,000 of the 12,000 deaths due to air pollution in Iran annually.

== See also ==
- Environmental issues in Tehran
- Air pollution in Iran
