= Happiness in Iran =

According to a World Happiness ranking study, the Islamic Republic of Iran is among the unhappiest countries in the world. The Iranian state is a theocratic Shia Islamic totalitarian government under Sharia law. The Iranian state also apprehends people making dancing videos, exercising freedom of expression, and practicing their faith outside of Islam among other activities that Iranian citizens find happiness in. The average amount of money spent by Iranians for leisure activities is IRR 570,000 (less than $15), while the average time spent on leisurely activities is 4 hours, half of the average time spent by people in the United States.

In 2024 the minister of tourism Ezzatollah Zarghami criticized Ayatollah Khamenei’s government claiming that since the Islamic revolution happiness has disappeared from the country. Cost of amenities has increased largely in the 15 year period from 2009 to 2024. A report by ISNA has blamed the Islamic Republic’s government policies under Ruhollah Khomeini and later Ali Khamenei for restricting popular happiness, one of the main causes for mass emigration from Iran.

A poll by Etemad has shown a rise in mental health problems exacerbated by lower wages and incomes.

As of 2020 there are 12.5 million Iranians with mental health problems.

By 2023, because of poverty and inflation, around 57% of Iranian citizens suffered from malnutrition. Iran ranked 126th worldwide in welfare. The Iranian rial (IRR) is among the most devalued currencies in the world as of 2023.

According to Hatam Ghaderi by the start of 2024 depression had become a commonplace condition nationwide.

== Trust ==
In 2024 poll by Minister of Islamic culture and guidance, highlighted more than 27% of people said they had zero trust in other people.

As of 2026 public dissatisfaction with the regime reportedly stood at 60%.

== Social engineering ==
The Iranian government has attempted cultural engineering through renaming Iranian festivals in 2023.

== Timeline ==
In late November 2023 in the northern Iranian town of Rasht in Gilan province, a 70-year-old man at a fish market (Sadegh Bana Motajadded) was recorded dancing and singing to an Iranian folk song. On 1 December, he posted a version of the video on his Instagram page which went viral, generating 80 million views by mid-December. Iranians sang and danced to the song "on the streets, in shops, at sports stadiums, in classrooms, malls, restaurants, gyms, parties and everywhere else they congregate". According to at least one source—The New York Times—the phenomenon is noteworthy because music, dancing and singing are "deeply rooted" in the culture of Iran. However, dancing, especially by women or mixed-gender, has been forbidden in the Islamic Republic of Iran since it came to power in 1979.

Bana Motajadded told a local television reporter that he was dancing “to make people happy. I only want people to be happy and to change their mood,” but authorities cracked down. On December 7 local police in Rasht announced they had removed the video from several websites, arrested twelve men who had appeared in the video and shut down their Instagram pages. On Bana Motajadded’s Instagram page, his profile photo was replaced by an emblem of the Islamic Republic's judiciary, and all of his posts were replaced with one from the judiciary reading, “this page has been shut down for creating criminal content” and that the person who had engaged in the activity “has been dealt with.” According to a person "familiar with the details of the arrests" interviewed by The New York Times, the local intelligence division of the Islamic Revolutionary Guards Corp detained Bana Motajadded for several hours and accused him of “instigating against the government", the men in the video were also summoned, interrogated for hours, blindfolded, beaten, threatened with legal action and forced to sign a pledge never to sing and dance in public again.

News of the arrests and a backlash against them spread rapidly across Iran. Videos of people singing and dancing to the song were posted on social media and circulated on WhatsApp and other applications, in what came to be called the “happiness campaign.” The official Persian-language page of the Asian Football Confederation (which has nearly 4 million followers) posted a video compilation of some Iranian footballers and teams dancing and cheering to the song.

In response the Gilan province police backed down, denied they had ever arrested Bana Motajadded, and restored the posts on his Instagram page. Local news channels interviewed him.

== See also ==
- 2021–2022 Iranian protests
