= May 2025 Iranian protests =

Nationwide strikes in Iran

In May 2025, nurses, farmers, workers, bakers, truckers, and drivers in Iran staged nationwide strikes in response to rising insurance premiums, poor road security, high fuel prices, and low freight rates and the Iranian economic crisis and Iranian energy crisis. There are 365,000 truckers in Iran. The strikes have led to supply shortages. Strikes have been in more than 155 cities.

== Background ==
In recent years, there were protests against the Iranian government stemming from political repression, economic hardship, and social restrictions. Demonstrators oppose government corruption, human rights violations, and lack of political freedoms. Economic issues, including inflation and unemployment, have further fueled public discontent. Additionally, restrictions on personal freedoms, censorship, and crackdowns on dissent have led to widespread unrest. Protesters demand democratic reforms, greater civil liberties, and an end to authoritarian rule.

The Iranian regime's inability to enforce compulsory hijab laws and the growing gulf between state and society suggest that regime change may be becoming inevitable.

Truckers were striking nationally for 7 days with major support from Iranian regime opposition, and at least 11 people were arrested.

== Signpost protest ==
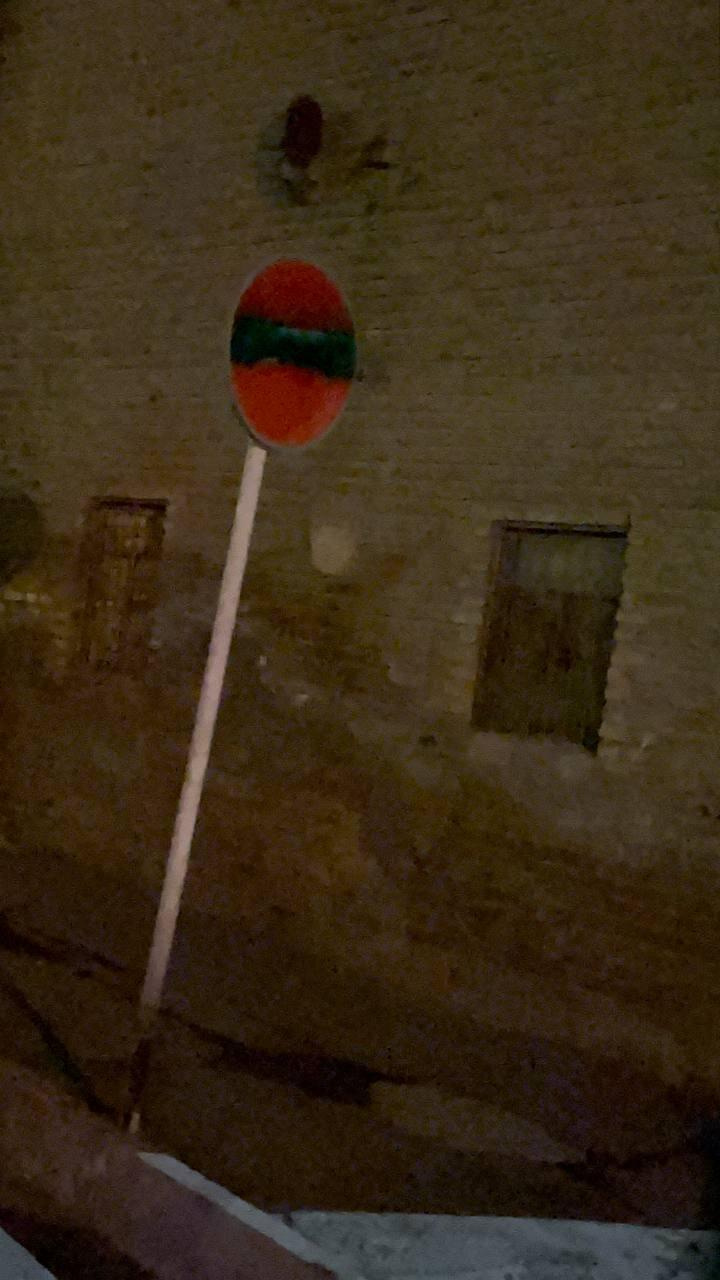

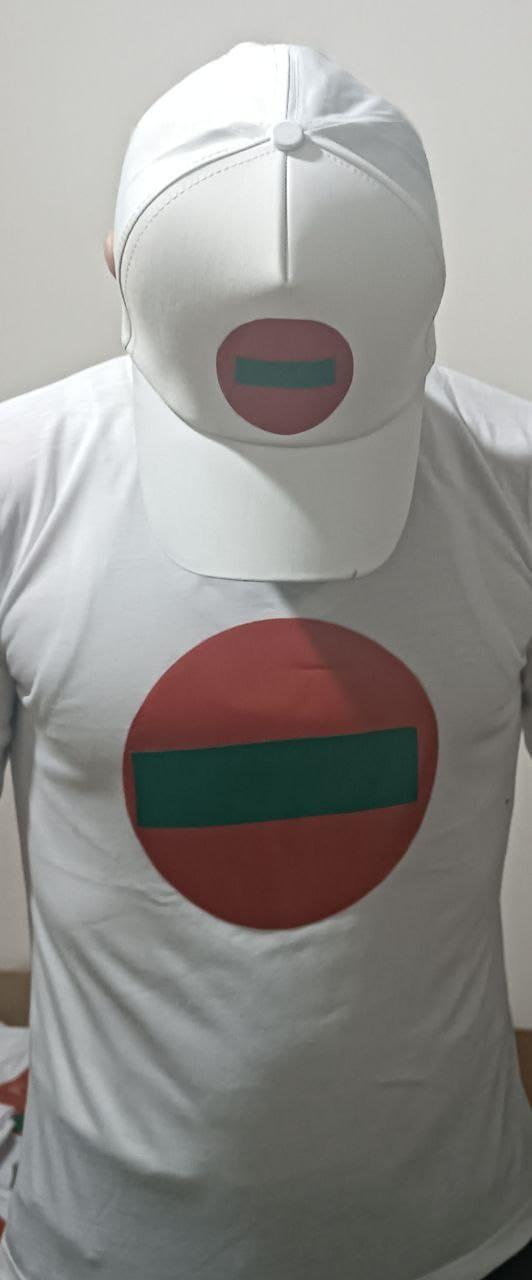

The 2025 Iran signpost protest began in February 2025, when numerous "No Entry" signs across Tehran, Karaj, and Hamadan were altered with a green line replacing the standard white one. The purpose and organizers remain unknown, and the signs seem to be part of a message of defiance against the regime with the anniversary of the 1979 Islamic Revolution. Some interpret it as a broader message of defiance, contrasting red (symbolizing prohibition and repression) with green (hope and resistance). The protest aligns with past acts of dissent, where citizens have modified traffic signs and used graffiti, murals, and banners to protest against the regime.

On February 8, 2025, numerous 'No Entry' signs in various areas of Tehran were painted with a green line, replacing the white line in the middle. Similar modifications were reported in the cities of Karaj and Hamadan. The individuals responsible for this action and their intentions remain unidentified.

The modification of the signs has been subject to multiple interpretations: Some social media users suggested that the green color turned the altered signs into a statement meaning "No entry for Islam, mullahs, and Sayyids." According to Iran International, in Islamic culture, the color green is often associated with positive characters (saints versus villains). Others have interpreted the usage of green as representing hope, life, and the idea of liberty, contrasting with red as a symbol of danger, prohibition, and protest. The combination of these colors has been viewed as a metaphor for the struggle between repression and the desire for change in Iran.

=== Previous uses in Iran ===
The use of street signposts as platforms for political expression in Iran is a notable form of protest. This method allows demonstrators to convey powerful messages and challenge authority by repurposing public infrastructure. In January 2016, there was a case where the road where the Saudi embassy is located in Tehran was changed to "Nimr Baqir al-Nimr Street". This form of protest is part of a broader historical context of street naming and renaming in Iran, which has been used to shape collective memory and identity. After the 1979 Revolution, the Iranian regime engaged in a widespread renaming of streets and public spaces as a means of "de-commemorating" the pre-revolutionary regime and establishing a new religious collective identity. This process involved eliminating national and non-religious memories associated with Iranian culture and the previous regime and replacing them with names that reflected Shia traditions and memories. The practice of using street names for political expression extends beyond official state actions. Citizens and protesters have adopted similar tactics to voice their dissent and challenge the status quo. For example:

- In Tehran, many people continue to use pre-revolutionary street names as a subtle form of protest against the current regime.
- During the 2009 protests (the "Green Revolution") against the disputed elections in which Mahmoud Ahmadinejad was declared the winner, millions of people marched silently on Enghelab (Revolution) Street in Tehran to express their anger at the Islamic Republic.
- More recently, there have been instances of digital activism related to street names. In December 2023, Google Maps temporarily showed Tehran's main thoroughfare renamed from "Valiasr Street" to its pre-revolutionary name "Pahlavi Street," likely due to user edits.

These actions demonstrate how Iranians creatively use public spaces and symbols to express political dissent, even in the face of severe restrictions on freedom of expression. The renaming of streets or placement of symbolic signage serves as a powerful tool for drawing attention to specific issues and challenging authority within the public sphere. Such acts of protest often face significant risks in Iran. The government has imposed strict limitations on freedom of expression and has responded to various forms of protest with crackdowns, arrests, and internet shutdowns.

== Strike ==
In May 2025, a nationwide strike by truck drivers in Iran began in the southwestern port city of Bandar Abbas and spread to multiple provinces, including Isfahan, Shiraz, Tehran, and Kermanshah, according to reports from social media monitoring groups and Persian-language media based abroad. The strike was reportedly triggered by rising insurance premiums, poor road security, a proposed hike in fuel prices, and low freight rates. The planned increase would raise diesel fuel prices from approximately $0.04 to $0.50 per liter. While strikes occur occasionally in Iran, the duration and national scale of this action were considered unusual. Rights monitors reported arrests and confrontations with security forces. Iranian authorities acknowledged the economic concerns, with Parliament Speaker Mohammad Bagher Ghalibaf calling truckers a vital part of the supply chain and urging prompt government response. Officials acknowledged the truckers' concerns, and the Cabinet reportedly discussed the matter.

== Bakers' protests ==
A series of demonstrations took place in May and July 2025 in which bakers gathered outside local government offices to protest against harsh economic conditions, delayed subsidies, soaring production costs, and the reduction of government-allocated flour quotas. Protesters also criticized systemic mismanagement of the flour distribution system and economic policies affecting the baking sector. Some demonstrators directly criticized Supreme Leader Ali Khamenei for supporting government policies and ignoring the demands of the industry.

Bakers across Iran face increasing operational challenges due to strict price regulations on bread, unpaid government subsidies, rising costs of water, gas, and electricity, and the inflated prices of raw materials. These factors have significantly reduced profit margins for bakery owners. A worsening energy crisis has further affected bakery operations. Frequent and unannounced power outages prevent bakers from operating their ovens, causing large amounts of dough to spoil. Protesters also cited systemic infrastructure failures and illegal electricity theft as major issues.

During May 2025, demonstrations were held in several cities including Qom, Mashhad, Isfahan, and others. Bakers demanded permission to raise bread prices in line with inflation and production costs. They protested the "Nanino" platform and subsidy payment delays.

Protesters rallied against sudden increases in flour prices and insurance premiums on 28 May. Bakers rallied outside the Chamber of Guilds on 12 July. Bread prices rose by up to 52% in provinces like Qom, Gilan, Khorasan Razavi, and Hamedan. A protest was held outside the Grain and Commerce Office on 20 July, demanding increased flour quotas and timely subsidy payments.

== Exodus from Tehran ==
In June 2025 following the Twelve-Day War and airstrikes on Tehran the 2025 Iranian exodus from Tehran began, as reports of shortage of gas and other commodities emerged on the news as well as social media.

== Reactions ==
=== Iranians ===
The protests drew support from prominent figures, including Reza Pahlavi, Crown Prince of Iran, filmmaker Jafar Panahi, and Nobel Peace Prize laureate Narges Mohammadi, who framed the strike as a broader call against government repression and economic hardship.

=== International ===
The Foundation For Defense of Democracies, a pro-Israel neoconservative think tank, called on foreign policymakers for their global support for the labor strikes.

== See also ==
- 2025 Iran internal crisis
- 2025–2026 Iranian protests
- Iran Prosperity Project
- Hijab and chastity law
- Political slogans of the Islamic Republic of Iran
- Political slogans against the Islamic Republic of Iran
- Protests in Iran
- Women's rights in Iran
