= 2025 Iranian Farmers' Protests =

Protests regarding water, electricity, and other topics

- Part of 2025 Iranian protests
- Date: March – June 2025
- Location: Isfahan, Ahvaz, Natanz, Zarghan, Garmasar, Khuzestan, Rafsanjan, and others
- Caused by: Lack of access to legal water rights, water scarcity, prolonged power outages, delayed government payments to wheat farmers
- Methods: Demonstrations, road blockages, sit-ins, marches with agricultural equipment
- Status: Ongoing

The 2025 Iranian Farmers' Protests refer to a wave of demonstrations by farmers across various regions of Iran including Isfahan, Ahvaz, Natanz, Zarghan, Garmsar, Khuzestan, Rafsanjan, and others, primarily over violations of their water rights (Haq-e Ab), severe water shortages, repeated long-term power outages, and delayed payments by the government to wheat growers. Farmers also demanded attention to a broader set of economic and livelihood concerns.

== Protests ==
=== March ===
In Isfahan on 24 March 2025, groups of farmers organized a protest demanding their legal water share (Haq-e Ab) from the Zayandeh Rood River. Demonstrations had been ongoing in recent weeks as water allocations remained unmet.

On 30 March, Isfahani farmers protested for a second consecutive day, demanding their Zayandeh Rood water rights. Security forces reportedly attacked protesters using tear gas and pellet guns. Some farmers, who brought their tractors into the streets, warned they would not return home until their demands were met and threatened to hold Eid al-Fitr prayers in front of the Isfahan Water Authority.

=== April ===
On 3 April, Farmers in eastern Isfahan chanted slogans such as “Zayandeh Rood water is our absolute right,” calling for water release to their farmlands. In Natanz, residents protested the extraction of agricultural water by mining companies allegedly supported by the Forests, Range and Watershed Management Organization and the Ministry of Industry, Mine and Trade.

On 17 April, farmers from the Feyzabad Dam region near Zarghan gathered in protest over insufficient irrigation water.

On 24 April, farmers from Aradan and Garmsar protested the delay in water release from the Namrood Dam, which had resulted in damaged crops and major financial losses.

=== May ===
On 16 May, farmers in Rafsanjan staged a demonstration in front of the governor's office over continuous and prolonged power outages affecting their agricultural operations.

On 21 May, farmers in Khuzestan Province gathered outside the Ahvaz governor’s office to demand overdue payments from the government.

On 28 May, wheat farmers in Khuzestan, who had not been paid for 48 days since delivering their crops to the government, marched and held a protest rally outside the provincial government building in Ahvaz.

=== June ===
On 10 June, farmers from Kamfirouz in Shiraz demonstrated in front of the Fars Province Governorate, demanding water allocations and protesting the resulting poverty and unemployment in their communities.

== See also ==
- 2025 Iranian protests
