= 2018 Iranian university protests =

Protests in December 2018 in Iran

- Part of 2017–2018 Iranian protests
- Date: 4 December 2018 – 31 December 2018
- Location: Tehran, Babol, Tabriz, Kermanshah
- Caused by: Arrests of workers, teachers, and students Political and economic situation of the country Unfavourable condition of universities
- Methods: Demonstrations
- Result: Protests quelled; Discontent continues to grow amongst students in Iran

Parties
Students	Islamic Republic; • Police; • Basij

Lead figures
(No centralised leadership)	Ali Khamenei; Hassan Rouhani

Number
Hundreds	

Casualties
- Injuries: 2
- Arrested: 1

The 2018 Iranian university protests were a series of protests, a spillover clash of the 2017–2018 Iranian protests, occurring as part of the wider Iranian Democracy Movement, by Iranian university students in support of labour, and teacher strikes, as well as protesting against the current situation of the country. The protests started on 4 December 2018, ahead of university day on 7 December, which is usually marked by protests.

== Protests ==
=== 4 December ===
On 4 December 2018, students at the Amirkabir University of Technology in Tehran gathered in support of the ongoing labour and teacher strikes. Students clashed with Basij counter protesters. Students chanted "Cannons, tanks, and weapons have no effect anymore", "Workers and students unite", "Jailed teachers, workers, and students must be freed", and "Death to this deceptive government". Elsewhere in Tehran, students Allameh Tabataba'i University protested against the presence of members of the Ministry of Intelligence on the campus.

On the same day students at the Babol Noshirvani University of Technology protested and chanted "The university is alive", "Stop crackdown on university students", and "University students will die, but will not accept oppression".

Students at the Sahand University of Technology also protested and held a hunger strike. Students at the Razi University of Kermanshah also held a protest in support of workers in Khuzestan, and chanted "Bread, freedom, workers council".

=== 29 December ===
On 29 December, students at the Islamic Azad University, Science and Research Branch, Tehran gathered on campus to mourn and protest after ten people were killed in a bus accident on the campus on 25 December. Students demanded the resignation of the chairman of the Islamic Azad University Ali Akbar Velayati. The protesters, who numbered in the hundreds, also chanted against the incompetent officials who they felt were responsible for the incident.

=== 30 December ===
Students at the Islamic Azad University, Science and Research Branch, Tehran gathered for a second consecutive day of protests on 30 December. The students chanted "Velayati, you are responsible for these killings" and "Incompetent officials must be prosecuted". Video from the protests showed a car running over and injuring two students.

=== 31 December ===
On 31 December 2018, students and other citizens gathered in front of the University of Tehran in solidarity with the students at the Islamic Azad University, Science and Research Branch, Tehran. Protestors were met by the security forces and anti-riot police who attempted to control the demonstration. Demonstrators clashed with the security forces and chanted "Death to the dictator", "Our fronts to the nation, our backs to the enemy", "Don't be scared, we are all together", and "Incompetent officials must resign". Earlier on Christmas, a bus taking about 30 students on a mountain road hit a concrete road, which resulted to the death of 10 passenger and injury of 25 others. Students were from Islamic Azad University in northeast of Iran. Iran's officials are blamed for not using safety precautions, This bus was considered out of service six years ago.
