= Iran crisis =

Iran crisis may refer to:

- Iran crisis of 1946
- Iran hostage crisis
- 2009 Iranian election protests
- 2017–18 Iranian protests
- Iranian financial crisis
- Iranian energy crisis
- 2025–2026 Iran internal crisis
- 2026 Iran war
- 2026 Strait of Hormuz crisis

== See also ==
- Iran coup (disambiguation)
- Iran protests (disambiguation)
