= August 2018 uprising in Iran =

Political protest

August 2018 Iranian protests
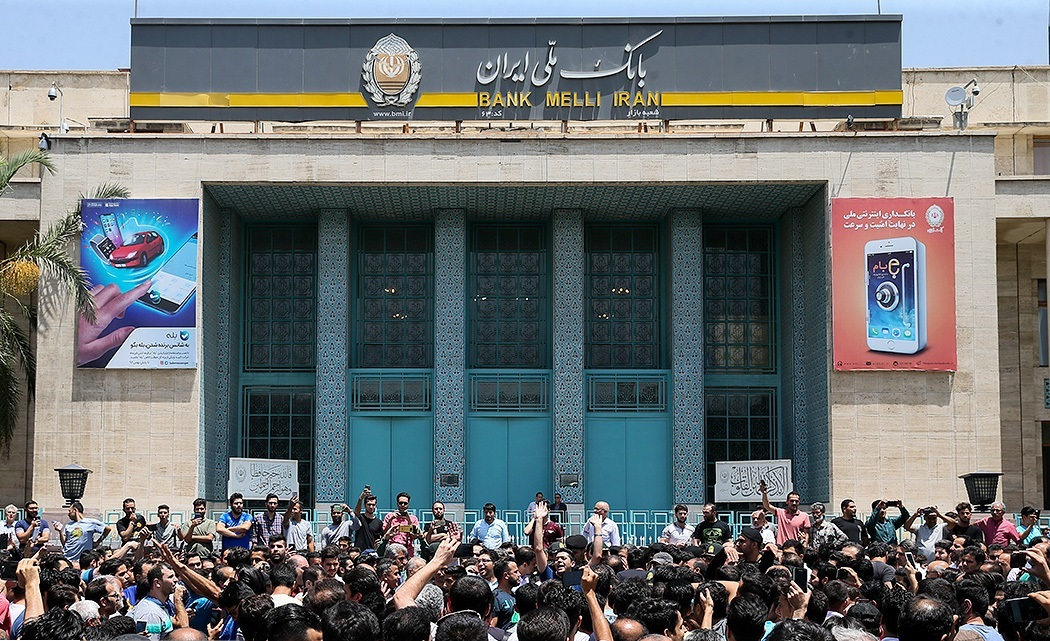
- Bazaar protests versus Bank Meli Iran
- Date: July 31, 2018 – August 4, 2018
- Location: Iran
- Caused by: Devaluation and devastation of economy; Economic crisis
- Goals: Resignation of President and government; Fresh general elections; End to economic crisis
- Methods: Demonstrations, Riots
- Result: Protests suppressed by force

Deaths and injuries
- Death: 1
- Injuries: 10+

The August 2018 uprising in Iran is a mass movement and political demonstrations that began on 31 July, sharing dissatisfaction with the economy and continued for five days in Iran.

== Background ==
Iran has a history of protest movements, revolts, uprisings and revolutions. Protests first began with the 1963 demonstrations in Iran, then the outbreak of the 1979 Iranian Revolution, then the 20 June 1981 Iranian protests, then the Iran student protests, July 1999, the 2003 Iranian student protests, the 2009 Iranian presidential election protests, 2011-2012 Iranian protests and more. Economic turmoil has also triggered protests across Iran, and it was the case of the movement in 2018, August.

== Protests ==
On 1 August, protests occurred in several Iranian cities. The protests began in Isfahan and continued in Karaj. The new wave of protests began with dissatisfaction and disappointment at deteriorating economic conditions and perceptions of government corruption. In videos that circulated on social media, purportedly filmed in the town of Gohardasht, a suburb of Karaj, dozens of demonstrators were seen in the streets setting fire to police vehicles and shouting "Death to the dictator". Police responded with tear gas. The authenticity of the videos could not immediately be verified. Police vehicles was pelted over and demonstrators threw stones and chanted slogans depicting the regime. Dissatisfaction grew amid growing street opposition.

Protests popped up on August 2 across several Iranian cities, including Mashhad, Kara, and Shiraz, and Tehran. Chants during demonstrators included "death to the dictator". Protesters again were met with a violent response, Bloodless protests occurred throughout the country and Countrywide protests continued onto 3–4 August.

On 3 August, street protests took place in the capital Tehran, and nine other cities: Ahvaz, Hamedan, Isfahan, Karaj, Kermanshah, Mashhad, Shiraz, Urmia and Varamin. Some citizen journalist reports said Iranian security forces tried to break up the demonstrations with tear gas and by beating and arresting protesters. But, there were no credible reports about how many Iranians were hurt and detained by the authorities. Protesters also targeted a religious school in Karaj province near Tehran. Protesters were arrested and forcibly dispersed with Tear gas. Beatings and clashes between stone-throwing demonstrators and security forces occurred in the day on 4 August. Protesters marched and chanted “Death to the Dictator” as they demanded the fall of the government over economic turmoil and political unrest. When widespread social unrest entered its fifth day, 50 were arrested by the security forces.

== See also ==
- 2017-2018 Iranian protests
