= Iran coup =

Iran coup may refer to:

- 1921 Persian coup d'état, a series of events in 1921, which eventually led to the establishment of the Pahlavi dynasty
- 1953 Iranian coup d'état, removal of Prime Minister Mohammad Mosaddegh, supported by the United States and the United Kingdom through the covert Operation Ajax
- Nojeh coup plot (1980), attempted overthrow of the newly established Islamic Republic of Iran by Shapour Bakhtiar with support from Jordan and Iraq

== See also ==
- Iran crisis (disambiguation)
