= Environmental issues in Tehran =

Tehran, the capital city of Iran, suffers from severe air pollution, and it is located near three major fault lines, while being the most populous region of the country. The officials have created financial incentives to encourage around 5 million citizens to leave the city. On December 16, 2019, Tehran had its highest air pollution index of 181.

== Air pollution ==
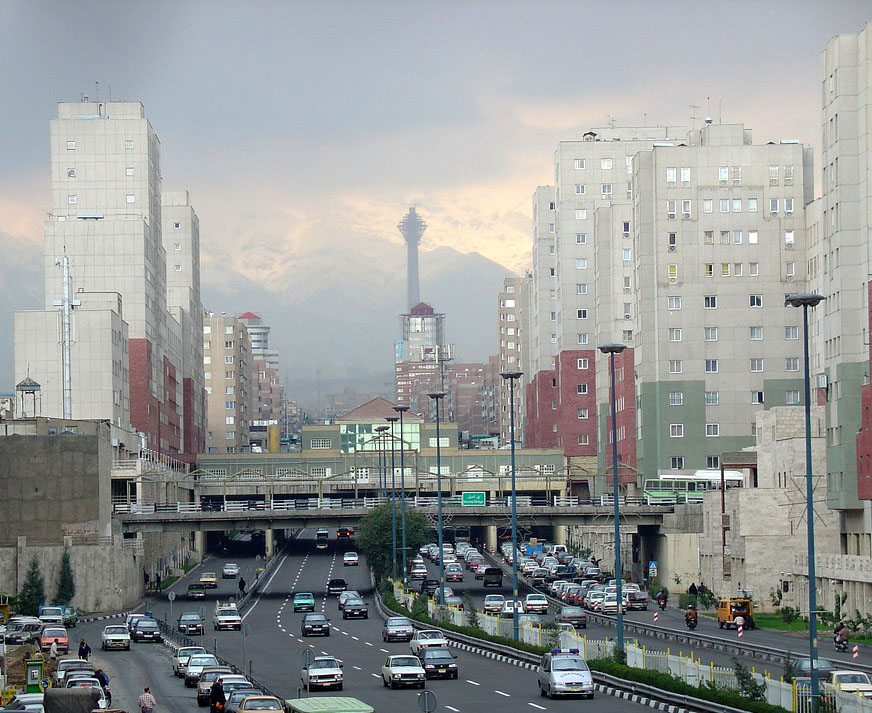
Air pollution in Tehran

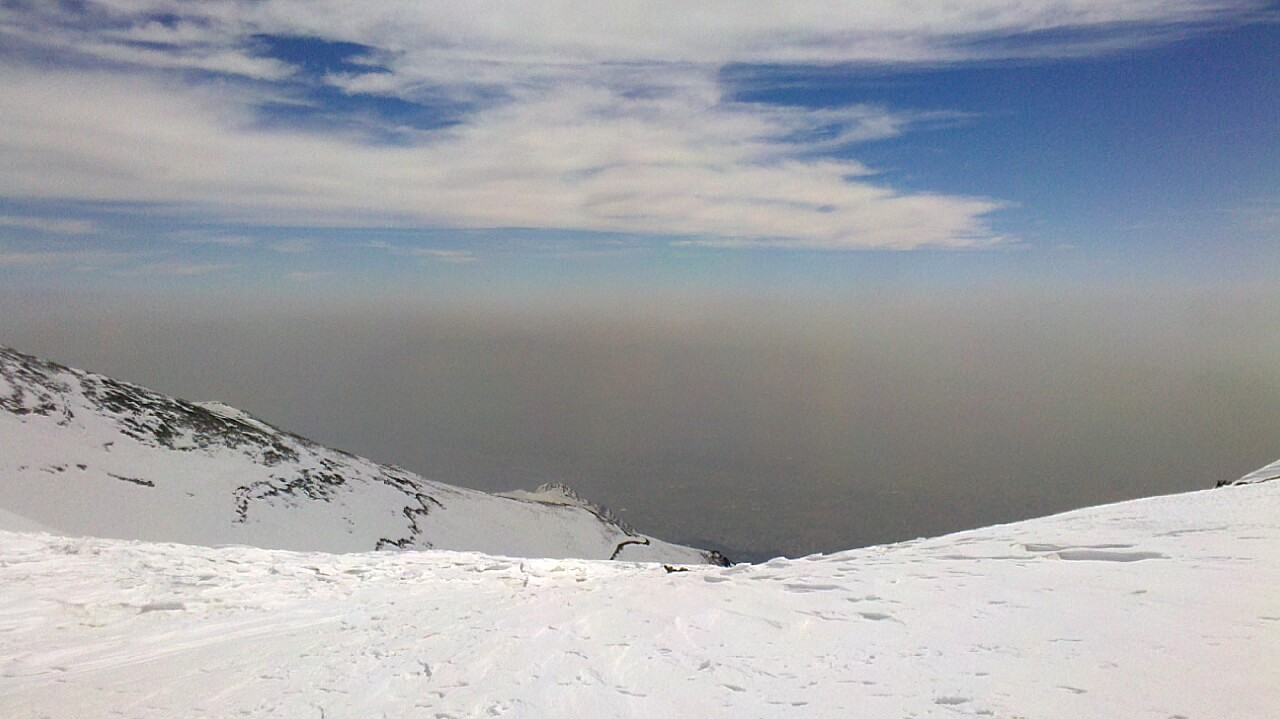
The pollution seen from above of Tochal peak

Tehran is rated as one of the world’s most polluted cities. Parts of the city are often covered by smog, making breathing difficult and causing widespread pulmonary illnesses. It is estimated that about 27 people die each day from pollution-related diseases. According to local officials, 3,600 people died in a single month due to the hazardous air quality. 80% of the city's pollution is due to cars. The remaining 20% is due to industrial pollution. Other estimates suggest that motorcycles alone account for 30% of air and 50% of sound pollution in Tehran.

The air pollution is due to several different reasons:

- Economical: most Iranian industries are located on the outskirts of Tehran. The city is also overrun with old and aging cars which do not meet today's emission regulations. Furthermore, Iran's busiest airport, Mehrabad International Airport, is located in the west of the city.
- Most people are then obliged to either use private cars or hire taxis. This has created severe traffic congestion;
- Gasoline quality: Due to international sanctions, the Iranian government allowed its refineries (designed to produce petrochemical products) to manufacture sub-par gasoline.
- Geographical: Tehran is bound in the north by the massive Alborz mountain range that is stopping the flow of the humid Caspian wind. As a result, thermal inversion that traps Tehran's polluted air is frequently observed. The lack of humidity and clouds makes Tehran a very sunny city. The UV radiations then combined with the existing pollutants significantly raise the level of the ozone. In fact one of the urban landmarks in central Tehran is a giant air quality gauge.

However, the government is engaged in a battle to reduce air pollution. It has, for instance, encouraged taxis and buses to convert from petrol engines to engines that run on compressed natural gas. Furthermore, since 1979, the government has set up a "Traffic Zone" covering the city center during peak traffic hours. Entering and driving inside this zone is only allowed with a special permit.

The government is also trying to raise people's awareness about the hazards of the pollution. One method that is currently being employed is the installation of Pollution Indicator Boards all around the city to monitor the current level of particulate matter (PM10), nitrogen dioxide (NO_{2}), ozone (O_{3}), sulfur dioxide (SO_{2}), and carbon monoxide (CO). The board also displays the Pollutant Standards Index (PSI), which is a general indication of air quality based on the measurements of the above-mentioned five pollutants. The Pollution Indicator Boards classify the level of each pollutant as either safe, hazardous or dangerous.

In January 2017, Al Arabiya reported that pollution in Tehran has hit a dangerous level on the Air Quality Index. On February 5, 2018 the Air Pollution Monitoring Center announced the air pollution index of the capital as 161 which is in the red zone.

== Earthquake ==
Tehran sits on two major fault lines, and it has been hit by over 1000 big and small earthquakes; although, the region has not been hit by a severe earthquake in the last 150 years.

The city has been rapidly growing, and many buildings have been constructed without enough earthquake readiness. This is while there has been a 90% chance of an extent 6.0 or greater earthquake in the coming decades.

== Capital relocation ==
In 2010, the government announced that "for security and administrative reasons, the plan to move the capital from Tehran has been finalized." The Iranian Parliament named Shahroud, Esfahan and Semnan as three of the main candidates to replace Tehran as the capital. There are plans to relocate 163 state firms to the provinces and several universities from Tehran to avoid damages from a potential earthquake.

== See also ==
- Environmental issues in Iran
- Geography of Iran
- List of earthquakes in Iran
