= Clean Air Law of Iran =

2017 law in Iran

Clean Air Law of Iran (Persian: قانون هوای پاک) was enacted on 16 July 2017. The law introduces heavier punishments and fines for any industries or individuals that do not adhere to the pollution limits. The act singles out inefficient vehicles, substandard fuels, industrial activities and dust storms as the major sources of air pollution in the country. 20 government agencies are committed to execute this law.

== See also ==
- Department of Environment of Iran
