= 2021 Iran workers' strike =

2021 Iranian workers strike protests
- Date: June 19th 2021 – early July
- Location: Iran
- Caused by: Oil crisis; Energy crisis; Oil prices and heat soaring and skyrocketing
- Goals: Ultimatum with government for wage increases and better working benefits
- Methods: demonstrations, general strike
- Result: Strikers fired and sacked; Strikers end the protests without any results

The 2021 Iran workers strike (also known as Campaign 1400) is a strike in Iran that began in June 2021 by temporary and contract petrochemical workers in Assaluyeh, protesting against low wages, poor working conditions, and a lack of access to necessities such as affordable housing and healthcare. The strikes soon spread, and workers in other Iranian cities gradually went on strike. The first day of the strike was on 19 June and is currently ongoing, but strikes ended on 7 July.

== Background ==
Iran has seen protests like these before, being one of the biggest industrial action in Iran since the Iranian Revolution, in which mass strikes and protests occurred. These protests are contributed by the energy crisis and power blackouts in the nation, and the skyrocketing oil prices add to that. Oil workers have faced a very hard time, with the COVID-19 pandemic in Iran entering its fifth wave and the temperatures scoring into the 50s so there is a lot of problems for the workers.

Over 150 000 workers in the Iranian energy and petrochemical industry are employed on temporary contracts, receiving a salary below $300 monthly and without access to benefits. The workers further have no union recognised by the Iranian government. Conditions in the dormitories are poor and unhygienic, the food in the canteens is sub-standard and wages are low. Because the workers are employed through intermediaries, they cannot negotiate better conditions directly with the oil and gas companies. Pay and conditions are set by the contractors. Contractors also routinely underpay social security contributions by misclassifying workers, which affects their pensions, unemployment and sickness cover.

== Strike ==
The strike has been dubbed Campaign 1400, in reference to the current year in the Solar Hijri calendar, with strike activity being reported on the first day in Tehran, Khuzestan and Esfahan, but the actual strike began in Bidkhoon, Bushehr Province on June 19. On June 21, 2021, strikes began at refineries and quickly spread to many petrochemical plants and a number of power stations. Many employees stopped work and left their posts. The strikes are a significant tactical shift compared to protest rallies of the past which usually did not include work stoppages.

Thousands of workers continued demonstrations demanding higher wages throughout the country, with huge strike protests taking place in Shush, Mahshahr, Asaluyeh, Bushehr and Tehran on the 25th, 24th, 23rd, 26th and 27th of June. Tired, Hungry and Desperate is what some demonstrators described during the protest strikes and campaigns, calling for wage increases and attention to them by the government. A general strike paralysed the nation on 30 June.

== See also ==
- 2021 in Iran
