= 2021 Sistan and Baluchestan protests =

Series of protests in Iran

- Part of 2016–2022 Iranian protests
- Date: 23 February 2021 – 27 February 2021
- Location: Sistan and Baluchestan province, Iran
- Caused by: Killing of Baloch fuel traders
- Methods: Demonstrations, Road closures

Parties
Protesters	Islamic Republic; • Police; • IRGC

Lead figures
	Ali Khamenei; Hassan Rouhani; Ebrahim Raisi

Casualties
- Deaths: 37+ killed during protests and 17 workers
- Injuries: unknown
- Arrested: +300 arrested

The 2021 Sistan and Baluchestan protests were a series of protests in the Sistan and Baluchestan province of Iran. The protests started on 23 February 2021 after multiple Baloch fuel traders were killed at the Iran–Pakistan border.

== Timeline ==
=== 23 February ===
After at least ten fuel traders, including a 17-year-old, were shot and killed by the armed forces of the Islamic Republic the previous day, protests and strikes erupted across Sistan and Baluchestan province on 23 February. In Saravan, protesters were met with live ammunition after they occupied the governor's office.

=== 24 February ===
On 24 February, protests intensified across the province. In Zahedan, protesters clashed heavily with the security forces, and overran a police outpost. Demonstrations were also reported in Khash, Iranshahr, and Saravan. Internet service in various areas of the province, including Zahedan and Saravan, was completely cut. According to Iran Human Rights Monitor, two protesters, Mohammad Saleh Motaghedi and 13-year-old Hassan Mohammadzehi were killed after they were shot by the Islamic Revolutionary Guard Corps. Mahmoud Vaezi blamed Pakistani authorities for the killings.

=== 25 February ===
Despite a complete internet shutdown, and heavy security presence, protests and strikes continued into 25 February in various cities in the province. In neighbourhoods of Zahedan, protestors set up roadblocks and clashed with the security forces.

== Responses ==
High Commissioner for the UNHCHR Rupert Colville condemned the killing of estimated 23 people by Sepah. Several Balochs from Pakistani Balochistan staged protest in support of their Iranian counterparts.
