= Sadegh Booghi =

Iranian trumpeter and shopkeeper

Sadegh Bana Motajadded
- Born: 1953 (69–70); Rasht or Anzali, Gilan, Iran
- Other names: Sadegh Booghi; Uncle Sadegh
- Occupations: Leader of Damash and Sepidrood‌ clubs fans (formerly) fishmonger (after retirement)
- Known for: Dancing and singing in the Bazaar of Rasht
- Title: Booghi
- Family: Abbas Bana Motajadded (brother)

Sadegh Bana Motajadded (Persian: صادق بنا متجدّد), known as Sadegh Booghi (Persian: صادق بوقی; born 1952 or 1953), is a Gilaki Iranian fishmonger and former leader of fans of Damash and Sepidrood‌ sports clubs from Rasht, Gilan province. He gained the name Sadegh Booghi, or "Uncle Sadegh", due to his works as a leader and publicist for football teams in northern Iran. He gained attention in December 2023 when a video of him dancing to a Gilaki folk song was posted on Instagram. He was subsequently arrested and his Instagram taken down; a number of social media users showed their support by posting videos of group dances.

Sociologist Chahla Chafiq called the viral dancing video part of an opposition to death worship Iranian regime.

== Background ==
Motajadded works as a fishmonger in Rasht.

He began uploading videos to Instagram a few months prior to his arrest, and had around 128,000 followers by December 2023. The videos, mainly filmed in the Bazaar of Rasht, showed Motajadded dancing to folk music.

== Arrest and reactions ==
Motajadded was arrested in December 2023 for his dancing videos, which, according to police, "violated public morals". However, other authorities have denied that Motajadded was arrested. Social media users were quick to criticize the arrest of the "happy old man", and pointed to the hypocrisy of authorities in not arresting more prominent individuals who more blatantly break the country's laws.

Some reports, denied by Iranian authorities, said that several shops near where the videos had been filmed had been shut down. Motajadded's Instagram was blocked by authorities after his arrest, as were several other accounts which had shared his videos. Some account owners or moderators were also arrested.

In response to Motajadded's arrest, many Iranian social media users began posting their own dancing videos. Some of the videos included women dancing without hijabs, in defiance of Iran's obligatory veiling.
