= Sahand University of Technology =

Public technical university in East Azerbaijan Province, Iran

Coordinates: 37°55′49″N 46°08′37″E

Tabriz University of Technology (Sahand)
- دانشگاه صنعتی تبریز (سهند)
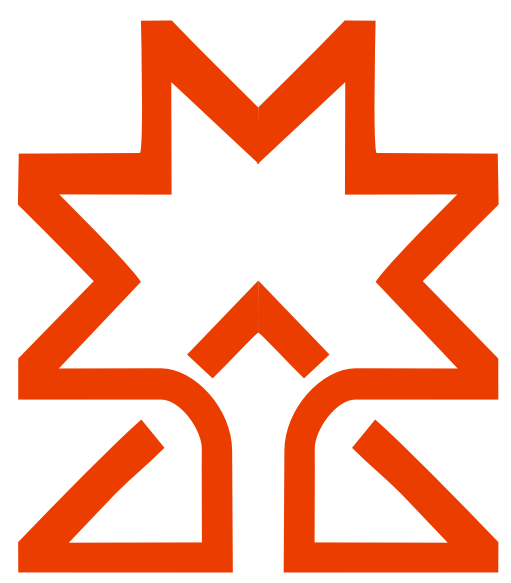
- Motto: تربیت مهندس بر فراز قلل
- Motto in English: Engineer training on the summits
- Type: Public
- Established: 1989
- President: Esmaeil Fatehifar
- Location: East Azarbaijan Province, Iran
- Campus: Urban & Suburban
- Website: sut.ac.ir

Tabriz University of Technology (Persian: دانشگاه صنعتی تبریز), formerly Sahand University of Technology, is a technical university in East Azerbaijan province in northwest Iran. It was established in 1989 as the first technical university in Iran after Islamic revolution. TUT offers over 20 undergraduate programs and more than hundred engineering, science, and technology graduate programs.

The Shanghai Ranking Report ranked TUT among the top 150 or 200 universities in the field of metallurgical engineering, among the top 400 universities in the field of chemical engineering, and the top 500 universities in science and energy engineering from 2018 to 2020 in a row.

== History ==
Tabriz University of Technology (TUT) was the first technical university in Iran after the Islamic revolution. It was established in 1989 in Tabriz.

== Departments ==
- Faculty of Basic Sciences for Engineering
- Faculty of Chemical Engineering
- Faculty of Civil Engineering
- Faculty of Electrical Engineering
- Faculty of Materials Engineering
- Faculty of Mechanical Engineering
- Faculty of Mining Engineering
- Faculty of Polymer Engineering
- Faculty of Petroleum Engineering
- Faculty of Biomedical Engineering

== Research centers ==
The university hosts research centers in the following fields:

- Polymeric Materials
- Biotechnology
- Petroleum
- Reactor & Catalysis
- Environmental Engineering
- Nanotechnology
- ICT
- Advanced Materials
- Hydrometeorology & Seismic Engineering

== See also ==
- List of Iranian research centers
- Higher education in Iran
- List of universities in Iran
