= 2003 Iranian student protests =

Protest movement against the Islamic Republic

The 2003 Iranian student protests was a series of nationwide rallies and student protests in Iran against president Mohammad Khatami and demanded more liberal democratic reforms and justice over the deaths in the Iran student protests, July 1999.

Massive protests and General strikes first began on 12 June, when anti-government demonstrators chanted slogans against president Mohammad Khatami and his reign in power. The wave of popular, chaotic demonstrations became the biggest and most violent since 1999. Protesters had a clear demand, a more liberal democratic government and fresh elections to be held. Fresh street protests culminated into violence as riots broke out in Tehran, Abadan and teachers also started to rally. The student demonstrations consisted of Lobbying, Looting and Picketing. Mass protests strengthened and brewed, drawing international attention, and protesters also demanded Democracy, an end to Police brutality, Unemployment and Poverty to be curbed, Free speech and Free rights, Independent Media and free student education. Protests continued daily, triggering the Iran Revolutionary Guards to be sent to disperse protesters. Protesters chanted slogans and anti-corruption chants as marchers clashed with police at peaceful demonstrations in Mahshahr, where protest sites have been located, as well as Qom. Police tackled the Civil disobedience and nonviolent uprising by using Live ammunition and Rubber bullets to disperse protesters. The security forces managed to quell the mass uprising using brutal tactics after more demands was met in growing opposition street demonstrations by teachers and workers to president Mohammad Khatami. The protests first began after new plans to privatise universities by thousands of civilians and citizens, mainly young people, then turned into sustained anti-government rallies calling for the overthrow of the regime.

The anti-regime protests was the biggest since 1999, but protests was suppressed by the security forces, their demands was suppressed.

== See also ==
- Iran student protests, July 1999
- 2009-2010 Iranian election protests
