= 2021 Iranian water protests =

Protests against water shortages in Iran

Protests broke out in Iran's Khuzestan province on 15 July 2021 due to the ongoing water crisis in Iran but spread across the country to other provinces and cities where people organised rallies in solidarity with Khuzestan, including Tehran, Kermanshah, Isfahan, Bushehr, Lorestan, Kurdistan, East Azerbaijan, North Khorasan and Alborz.

Protests were soon dubbed 'The Uprising of the Thirsty" and turned violent as police forces attempted to suppress them due to demands for the end of the current regime. Casualties were recorded both amongst police forces and civilian demonstrators. Protests in Khuzestan lasted for around 10 days and were predominantly urban. The last large-scale demonstration in solidarity with Khuzestan took place on 31 July in Tehran. The violent nature of the protests received a lot media-attention and various government officials made statements promising extended and specific support to the region. This included releasing more water from Karkheh Dam in northern Khuzestan and sending emergency water tanks to most affected regions.

== Background ==
=== Water scarcity ===
The water crisis has worsened across Iran over the past decade due to over-pumping of groundwater resources, environmental damage, climate change and government policy regarding water management, dam building and river diversion. Kaveh Madani, former deputy head of the Iranian Environment Department, states that "the problem is rooted in decades of bad management, poor environmental governance and lack of foresight, and not getting prepared for a situation like this."

Previously characterised by fertile wetlands the landscape was ideal for agricultural production Khuzestan became also a top producer of other agricultural products such as wheat, sugar cane and corn. However most of the province's contribution to Iranian GDP comes from oil as it is Iran's most oil-rich province. Changing water infrastructure most heavily impacts residents and the subsistence of small-scale famers, livestock farming and fishing industries as oil-industry and large scale agricultural producers' access to water for irrigation is prioritised.

The surge in dam-building has been linked to the water scarcity in the region, as well as electricity cuts. For example, the drying out of Hour-al-Azim Lagoon which is part of the Hawizeh Marshes, has been linked to construction of dams on the Karkheh, Marun, and Zohra rivers. The diversion of the Karun river in upstream Chaharmahal and Bakhtiari province as part of the 2016 Behesht Abad tunnel project, which aims is to divert water to more arid Kerman, Yazd and Isfahan provinces, has also had a significant impact on reducing availability of water. At least 700 villages in Khuzestan have to be supplied drinking water through government water tanks due to the lack of clean drinking water. From an environmental perspective, flash floods in upstream Chaharmahal and Bakhtiari province and lowering of precipitation levels have also contributed to increased water scarcity.

=== Past local water movements ===
The summer 2021 protests belong to a wider series of protests that have taken place in the past 2 decades in the face of changing water policy and growing water scarcity. For example, in 2013 protestors formed human chains in protest against the Behesht Abad tunnel project, the longest counting around 10,000 people. Located on the border to Iraq, Khuzestan is furthermore viewed as a strategically important area for the government to maintain control over its minority population as it is home to Arab minority ethnicities, as well as Bakhtiari and Lurs tribes. Previous protests in 2018 were larger in scale as various locations in the country were faced with water shortages. In comparison, the 2021 series of protests were about water shortages concentrated in Khuzestan and demonstrations that took place outside of Khuzestan expressed solidarity with those in Khuzestan.

== Timeline ==
=== 15–18 July ===
Protests first broke out on 15 July across Khuzestan in Susangerd, Hamidiyeh, Ahvaz, Shadegan, Abadan, Iran, and Bandar-e Mahshahr. A member of parliament stated that over 700 villages in Khuzestan had been without water. Further to this, water shortages led to widespread power blackouts which were also being protested in these demonstrations.

Live gunfire was used to disperse crowds of people in Shadegan though the IRNA claimed that the man was accidentally shot by a bullet fired into the air. Videos circulating on social media also showed people setting fire to tires and blocking roads in the first days of protests Heavy police presence was reported at protests in Hamidiyeh, where people joined rallies and chanted "I Am Thirsty!".

On 16 July, street protests continued where demonstrators marched on the streets of Ahvaz, Mahshar, and Bushehr (not in Khuzestan - check Bushehr had protests erupt this early) and Bostan. According to media sources, one person was killed during protests by gunfire.

On 17 July videos circulated online from citizens, journalists, and media sources present at demonstrations and rallies in Kut-e Abdollah, Karkheh and Shush where regime forces opening fire on protesters, reportedly killing three people. Gunshots could be heard in other cities as tens of thousands of protesters marched and set vehicles on fire whilst chanting anti-government slogans such as "Death to Khamenei".

On July 18, a policeman was shot dead by protestors.

=== 20–21 July ===
From 20 July, protests spread to other provinces in Iran where groups organised rallies in solidarity with Khuzestan. Alongside cities in Khuzestan like Ahvaz, Ramhormoz, and Shadegan, protests took place outside of Khuzestan in Esfahan, Tehran, and Bushehr. Thousands gathered outside governor's offices in those areas and clapped and danced. There were children among them.

By the 21st of July, clashes with police forces escalated further. One protester was killed during a clash in Ahvaz and rallies in Esfahan, Yazdanshahr and Susangerd became increasingly violent. Demonstrators in Masjed Soleyman chanted, "Police, support us," a reference to local concerns about security forces cracking down harshly on earlier rallies.

=== 22 July ===
Persian-language media based continued to broadcast videos showing marches in Ahvaz, Hamidiyeh, Izeh, Mahshahr, Shadegan and Susangerd.

Pro-shah and anti-regime slogans such as "Reza Shah bless his soul" were chanted as thousands continued to protest in Mahshahr, Susangerd, Izeh, Shush and Bandar Abbas on 22 July, with gunshots becoming apparent. A viral video was posted with a woman asking a police officer why they are shooting at the demonstrators. Another fatality was reported as a man was shot, taken to hospital but was confirmed to be dead. Internet services have also been reported to have been disrupted in the region, as Tehran's residents protested in support of Khuzestan. A group of women chanted slogans on the Tehran Metro. Fires were lit as seven protesters were confirmed dead.

=== 23–31 July ===
In Ahvaz, protesters blocked a roadside and a highway to protest water scarcity. Flames rose in Susangerd and Lorestan during protests.

On 24 July, significant protests took place in the northwest city of Tabriz, in East Aberzaijan province, in solidarity with the protests in Khuzestan. Demonstrators chanted "Death to the Dictator" in solidarity with protestors in Khuzestan. Meanwhile, in Ahvaz, Shadegan and Mahshahr, more major protests occurred, as well as protests in Lorestan and Aligudarz. Police opened fire on demonstrators in Shadegan and Mahshahr whilst a funeral of a protester was held in Izeh. Further anti-government protests broke out in neighbouring Zanjan to protest the use of force against water protesters in Ahvaz and Aligudarz.

People gathered and protested were reported in Saqqez in Iranian Kurdistan. Protests also continued in Khuzestan Province and in East Azerbaijan Province. Heavy Security was also reported in Tabriz, and witnesses spotted protesters getting blindfolded by security forces.

Protests also took place in Tehran. Elsewhere, in Karaj, people also joined protests and employees of the Khomeini Hospital in Karaj marched on the streets to demand their unpaid wages and in objection to their economic woes. Protests continued in Izeh.

== Government response ==
Whilst protestors blame government water management policies the majority of official government responses to the growing water crisis in Khuzestan maintain that water shortages and subsequent power blackouts are due to environmental factors rather than mismanagement of resources. After protests erupted president Hassan Rouhani made a statement asking protestors to use other channels for protest. New-elect president Ebrahim Raisi stated that he would employ a special minister in cabinet to help Khuzestan with its water issues once he begins his term in August 2021.

=== Internet ===
Besides clashes between security forces and civilian protestors, internet services in Khuzestan province were slowed down. Over the past years, Iranian authorities have often restricted access to internet during protests in order to inhibit the sharing of information and images from protests. Sepehri Far, from Human Rights Watch, stated that "Instead of repressing the protests, the Iranian authorities should acknowledge the severity of the water crisis and commit to addressing it urgently at the national level".

=== Arrests and deaths ===
At the end of the protests HRANA confirmed that 361 individuals had been detained as a result of protests.

Names of confirmed civilian casualties by different human rights bodies that verified videos and reports are:

1. Mostafa Naeemavi (Asakereh), from Shadegan,
2. Qasem (Naseri) Khediri, from Kut Abdollah, injured and died in hospital
3. Meysam Echresh, from Kureh (Taleghani town), was injured and died in hospital
4. Isa Baledi, from Taleghani
5. Hadi Bahmani from the village of Susan in Izeh
6. Omid Azarkhosh from Aligudarz in Lorestan
7. Hamzeh (Farzad) Farisat, from Alavi in Ahvaz
8. Mehdi Chanani in Shoush
9. Hamid Mojadam (Jokari) in Chamran
10. Mohammad Abdollahi, Izeh

Names of confirmed police forces casualties:

1. Zargham Parast, police officer, in Taleghani

== International responses ==
- July 2021: UN High Commissioner for Human Rights Michelle Bachelet condemned violent crack-downs on protestors and asked Iran to focus on treating water shortages rather than suppressing the protests. Saeed Khatibzadeh responded to the comment and stated that though events in Khuzestan had taken an unfortunate turn her comments were based on false information.
- July 2021: Human Rights Watch published a report condemning the use of bullets and excessive violence by Iranian government forces during the protests, as well as internet censorship. It further emphasised the role that the Iranian governments should play in supporting its populations right to water.
- August 2021: Amnesty International similarly reported on incidents of reported police brutality used to oppress the protesters.
