= Natural Resources and Watershed Management Organization =

Iranian government organisation

Natural Resources and Watershed Management Organization (Former name: Forests, Range and Watershed Management Organization) is an Iranian government organisation established in 2002. Its duty is "protection, conservation, reclamation, development and utilization of forests, rangelands, forested lands, natural woods and coastal lands, as well as watershed management and soil conservation throughout the country."

It is the authority responsible for combating against deforestation.
