= Water supply and sanitation in Iran =

Data
- Access to an improved water source: 99% in urban areas
- Access to at least basic sanitation: 19% in urban areas
- Average urban water and sanitation tariff (US$/m^{3}): 0.06 (2002)

Institutions
- Decentralization to municipalities: Partial, at provincial level
- Water and sanitation regulator: None
- Responsibility for policy setting: Ministry of Energy
- Sector law: Provincial Water and Wastewater Companies Law of September 1990
- Service providers: 30

Water supply and sanitation in Iran is overseen by the Ministry of Energy, which sets policy and supervises the provision of services. The renewable water per capita in 2025 for each Iranian has decreased to less than 500 cubic meters per year, whereas this figure was previously 1,500 cubic meters.

== Access ==
The sector is characterized by a wide discrepancy in coverage of water and sewerage services, as well as between urban and rural areas. The Joint Monitoring Programme for Water Supply and Sanitation of the WHO and UNICEF, which monitors access figures based on national surveys and censuses, estimated access in Iran from the results of the censuses of 1996, 2006, and 2011 as well as a 1995 Multiple Indicator Cluster Survey. According its estimates, in 2011 access to an improved water supply was 98% in urban areas where more than two thirds of Iranians live. It was 90% in rural areas (87% house connections). Access to sewerage in urban areas was estimated at 19% in the late 1990s. Access to improved sanitation was estimated at close to 100%.

== Water resources ==
=== Climate ===
Rainfall in Iran is highly seasonal, with a rainy season between October and March, leaving the land parched for the remainder of the year. Immense seasonal variations in flow characterize Iran's rivers. For example, the Karun River in Khuzestan carries water during periods of maximum flow that is ten times the amount borne in dry periods. In numerous localities, there may be no precipitation until sudden storms, accompanied by heavy rains, dump almost the entire year's rainfall in a few days. Water shortages are compounded by the unequal distribution of water. Near the Caspian Sea, rainfall averages about 1,280 mm per year, but in the Central Plateau and in the lowlands to the south it seldom exceeds 100 mm.

Cumulative Precipitation according to Water Basins (millimeters)
Region	2012/13	1970–2014 (average)
Caspian Sea	405.2	423.3
Persian Gulf	343.6	358.6
Lake Urmia	278.9	326.7
Central basin	139.0	162.2
Hamun basin	78.5	110.5
Sarakhs basin	244.5	203.9
Iran	203.9	238.6

=== Water balance ===
Internal renewable water resources are estimated at 128.5 billion cubic meters (BCM)/year (average for 1977–2001). Surface runoff represents a total of 97.3 BCM/year, of which 5.4 BCM/year comes from drainage of the aquifers and thus needs to be subtracted from the total. Groundwater recharge is estimated at 49.3 BCM/year, of which 12.7 BCM/year is obtained from infiltration in the river bed and also needs to be subtracted. Iran receives 6.7 BCM/year of surface water from Pakistan and some water from Afghanistan through the Helmand River. The flow of the Arax river, at the border with Azerbaijan, is estimated at 4.6 BCM/year. The surface runoff to the sea and to other countries is estimated at 55.9 BCM/year. Per capita water availability in the pre-Islamic Revolution era was about 4,500 cubic meters. But, in 2009 this figure was less than 2,000 cubic meters. The total water withdrawal was estimated at 70 BCM in 1993, rising to 93 BCM in 2004, of which 92% was used for agricultural purposes, 6% for domestic use and 2% for industrial use. Although this is equal to 51% of the actual available renewable water resources, annual abstraction from aquifers (57 BCM in 1993, 53 BCM in 2004) is already more than the estimated safe yield (46 BCM). Of the 4.3 BCM/year in 1993 (6.2 in 2004) used for domestic purposes, 61% is supplied from surface water and 39% from groundwater. As of 2014, Iran is using 70% of its total renewable freshwater, far above the upper limit of 40% recommended according to international norms. A large part of the water used in agriculture is evaporated instead of properly used because of inefficient consumption patterns. 16 BCM of water was used for power generation in 1999.

Tehran with its population of about 9 million is supplied by surface water from the Lar dam on the Lar River in the Northeast of the city, the Latyan dam on the Jajrood River in the North, the Karaj River in the Northwest, as well as by groundwater in the vicinity of the city. The average Tehran resident uses 325 liters of water (86 gallons) per day. Tap water consumption in the country is 70% over and above the global average.

In March 2016 President Hassan Rouhani said at a conference that the "water consumption pattern" in Iran had to be changed, without making any specific recommendations on how this could best be achieved.

=== Seawater desalination ===
The Iranian government envisages massive investments in seawater desalination and in pipelines to bring water from the Southern shores to the interior of the country. In a first stage, desalination plants are to be built to supply coastal cities, while in a second stage cities on the central plateau are to be served as well. The plants and pipelines are expected to be financed by the private sector under Build-Own-Operate (BOO) Contracts where the government pays annual fees for the water produced. Such contracts for desalination plants already exist on a small scale with Iranian companies and are expected to be extended to larger contracts with international companies. The power for the desalination plants is expected to be provide at least partly by "small" nuclear power plants. Iranian Energy Minister Hamid Chitchian said that desalinated water would be provided to 45 million people in 17 provinces through 50 desalination plants, without specifying the costs or funding sources. Initially, water desalinated at Bandar Abbas would be transferred to Kerman province.

=== Pollution ===
Water pollution is caused by industrial and municipal wastewater, as well as by agriculture. Concerning municipal wastewater, the bulk of collected sewage is discharged untreated and constitutes a major source of pollution to groundwater and a risk to public health. In a number of cities without sanitary sewerage, households discharge their sewage through open rainwater drains.

== Infrastructure ==
=== Drinking water supply ===
Most drinking water in Iran is supplied through modern infrastructure, such as dams, reservoirs, long-distance transmission pipelines - some of which are more than 300 km long - and deep wells. There are 42 large dams under operation in Iran with a combined storage capacity of 33 BCM/year. These dams lose about 200 million cubic meters of storage capacity every year due to sedimentation (0.5-0.75% of their storage capacity). Most dams are multi-purpose dams for hydropower, irrigation, flood control and - in some cases - drinking water supply.

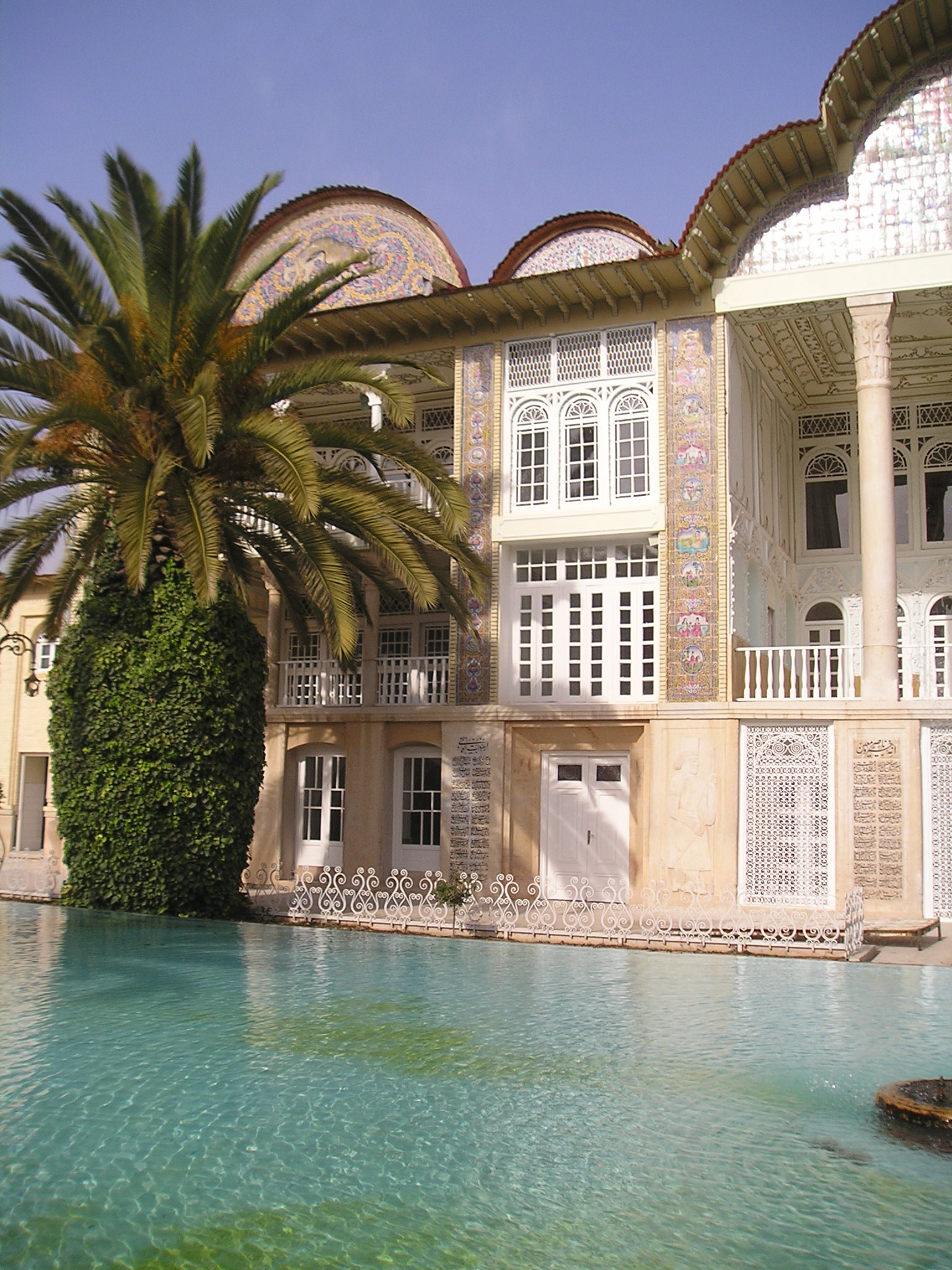
Water in Iran is used for the irrigation and decoration of traditional gardens, such as the Eram Garden in Shiraz.

It is estimated that there are as many as 500,000 deep and shallow wells in the country. Many of those wells are illegal.

An estimated 60,000 traditional Karez (کاریز) systems in the plateau regions of Iran in Yazd, Khorasan and Kerman - are still in use today for irrigation and drinking water supply in rural areas and small towns. The oldest and largest known Karez is in the Iranian city of Gonabad which after 2700 years still provides drinking and agricultural water to nearly 40,000 people. Its main well depth is more than 360 meters and its length is 45 kilometers.

=== Sewage system ===
Iran's Energy Ministry reported in January 2021 that some 90% of Tehran's integrated sewage system, a network of 8,000 kilometers of underground tunnels and large sewage treatment facilities, has become operational.

Previously, the majority of Tehran's population had untreated sewage injected to the city's groundwater.

== History and recent developments ==
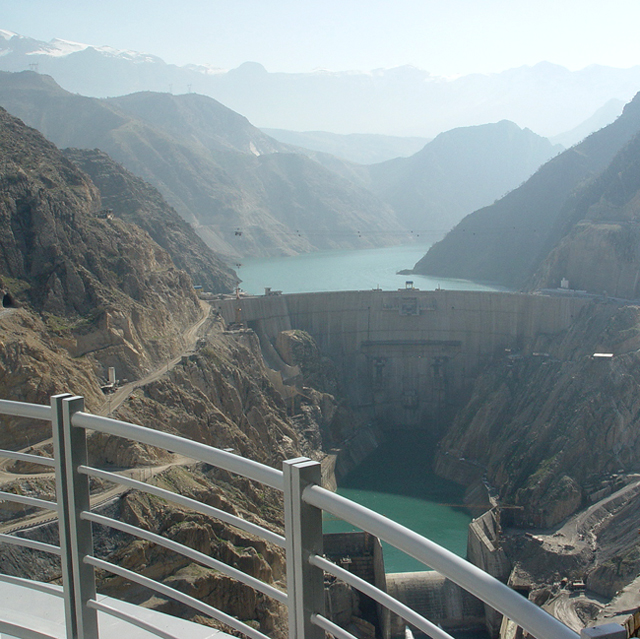
The government announced a large dam building program in 2008. Most dams in Iran, such as the Karun-3 dam shown are built for hydropower, flood control and irrigation, but not for drinking water supply.

Up to 1990 the water and sanitation sector was highly decentralized. Most water and wastewater service provision was the responsibility of municipalities and provinces. This was changed through a fundamental sector reform in 1990 with the ratification of the Provincial Water and Wastewater Companies Law of September 1990.

In September 2003 the Government of Iran and the World Bank agreed on a sector strategy with the targets for improved cost recovery and collection and increased efficiency. It is not clear what were the baseline data in 2003 and to what extent progress has been made to reach these targets.

In November 2008 the government announced that it has approved the construction of 177 dams nationwide. Dams in Iran serve primarily for hydropower generation, irrigation and flood control. However, one of the projects will provide drinking water and water for industrial use to the cities of Qom, Golpaygan, Delijan, Saveh, Khomein and Nimvar in the central provinces of Qom, Isfahan and Markazi.

In April 2012, the government launched a project to transfer Caspian Sea water to the central regions of Iran, bringing about 200 million cubic meters (7,062 million cubic feet) of water per year.

In April 2016 Deputy Minister of Energy Sattar Mahmoudi said that six major cities - Bandar Abbas, Shiraz, Kerman, Mashhad and Hamadan - faced acute water shortages, and water resources were under strain in another 450. Parts of Iran have faced droughts for the past 15 years.

Since the 1980s access to urban water supply has increased from 75.5% to 98%. According to one Iranian observer, the water quantity supplied has increased and the quality has improved. He concludes that the reform has been "very successful" and is "an example of best practice" that should "be proposed to other countries.

== Challenges ==
According to the World Bank, the sector is affected by "low water use efficiency in urban and rural uses; limited participation by stakeholders in development planning and management; large needs for rehabilitation and development of hydraulic infrastructure for sustainable water usage; problems of pollution caused by the discharge of untreated wastewater into public waterways and aquifers; and weak institutions involved in the sector and limited coordination among stakeholders." Still according to the World Bank it is also characterized by "poor performance of water supply and on-site wastewater disposal facilities, causing increasing risk for ground and surface water pollution and health and environmental risks resulting from the discharge and re-use of untreated effluent for irrigation; limited technical, institutional and financial capacity of water and wastewater companies; a lack of clarity of institutional responsibilities of sector entities; and non transparent and inadequate tariff structures and levels."

== Responsibility for water supply and sanitation ==
=== Policy ===
The Ministry of Energy, through its Deputy Ministry for Urban and Rural Water and Wastewater Management, is in charge of setting sector policies. The Deputy Ministry of Water Affairs in the same Ministry is in charge of water resources management, together with eleven Regional Water Boards. The Environmental Protection Organization is in charge of water pollution control. The Ministry of Health and Medical Education is responsible for setting drinking water quality standards, as well as monitoring and enforcing them. The National Water and Wastewater Engineering Company (NWWEC) provides oversight and assistance to service providers in areas such as investment planning, human resources development, and in the establishment of standardized systems and procedures. The National Economic Council sets tariff policy for the whole country, with some differentiation across regions.

=== Service provision ===
In 2008 sixty companies were responsible for the provision of water and wastewater services. Evenly spread over Iran's thirty provinces, each province has one urban and one rural water and wastewater company (WWC). The 60 companies had 38,000 employees. Only Tehran has two separate companies for water and sewerage. In all other provinces, water and sanitation services are provided together. The regional water boards provide bulk raw water through transmission pipelines to the water and wastewater companies, which treat and distribute it.

The state-owned WWCs are able to manage their day-to-day operations with a measure of autonomy where managing directors can make most decisions on operations and staffing within the limits of the centrally authorized staffing levels and with some flexibility to provide extra compensation to well-performing employees. However, the WWCs do not control their own investment programs and, therefore, have limited scope to improve investment and operating efficiency and the level and quality of service. Moreover, the WWCs have to follow an organizational model developed by the NWWEC and cannot select a model that would be more appropriate for their particular situation.

== Financial aspects ==
=== Investment ===
Until 2005, the national budget for the water sector stood at 1,400 billion rials while it has reached 3,500 billion rials (US$350 million using the official exchange rate) in 2008. This budget apparently includes a multi-purpose dam and irrigation as well as water supply and sanitation. The government said in 2011 that investment needs stood at US$150 billion over the next 15 years, 20% of which should be financed by the private sector.

=== Cost recovery ===
On average, the service providers do not recover operation and maintenance costs due to low tariffs and low bill collection. For example, the Provincial Water and Sewerage Companies for Ahwaz and Shiraz have been incurring significant net losses at least prior to 2004. The financial performance of the companies is further aggravated by high water losses of 38% in 2002/03 in Ahwaz and about 30% in Shiraz. Of the water that has been billed, only about 73% was collected in 2002/03 in Ahwaz, while it was higher in Shiraz.

=== Tariffs ===
The current urban tariff system is based on a fixed fee that depends on the size of the connection pipe and on the type of customer (household or other types), and on a volumetric charge based on increasing block-tariffs. The fixed fee, or the subscription fee, was about 2,000 Rials in 2004 (25 US cents) for most domestic customers while the structure of variable tariffs is based on a complex formula. The formula is the same for all companies and there is no volumetric charge if consumption falls below 5 cubic meter per month. Above this minimum, the tariff increases with the level of consumption and generally varies across companies. The average volumetric tariff for the country stood at about 6 US cents in 2002. It varied from 2 cents for monthly consumption below 20 cubic meter, to about 4.5 cents and 12.5 cents respectively for 20-40 and for more than 40 cubic meter of monthly consumption.

According to the World Bank, the rate structure is needlessly complex for both volumetric rates and connection fees. Volumetric tariffs are based on complex formulas that differ across consumption brackets and water and wastewater companies. Because of this complexity the tariff structure lacks transparency. Moreover, the structure is such that rates increase by more than threefold when consumption rises from 20 cubic meter or less to slightly higher volumes. Regarding sewage bills they are currently levied and collected only in neighborhoods where a network exists and are a percentage of water bills (70%).

Average connection fees are about US$310 for the whole country and the minimum fee is approximately equal to US$150. With a few exceptions, the connection fee for wastewater is the same as that for water. These fees have been regularly increased between 1999 and 2003, at the rate of 10% annually with the exception of the year 2000 in which the fee was increased by 15%. In addition to connection fees, the water and wastewater companies charge the customer the full cost for house connection.

== External cooperation ==
The main external partner of the Iranian water and sanitation sector during the first decade of the 21st century was the World Bank. Today the main external partners are the Islamic Development Bank, the United Nations and NGOs.

=== Islamic Development Bank ===
The Islamic Development Bank (IDB) has allocated more than 800 million euros of loans in total for Iran's water and wastewater projects as of 2014, including 65 million euros for eastern Mashhad's wastewater project, 140 million euros for projects in the cities of Qom and Kashan in central Iran, 175 million euros to Tehran, 195 million euros to rural wastewater projects and 92 million euros to Qom province's water project, 80 million euros for wastewater projects in Hamedan and Qeshm, and 144 million euro for wastewater projects in the southern Fars province. The Iranian wastewater sector is the largest recipient of IDB water and wastewater funds in the world, as the IDB has funded some of the gap caused by international sanctions. With 8.28% of the shares Iran is the third-largest shareholder of the IDB, whose largest shareholder is Saudi Arabia.

=== United Nations ===
UNESCO-IHE in Delft, The Netherlands, together with the Power and Water University of Technology (Shahid Abbaspour) in Iran, will train 2,100 Iranian professionals in water and wastewater technologies, planning and management. The training will consist of 59 courses to take place in 2008 and the first half of 2009. In addition, 20 study tours to European water and wastewater companies for senior managerial, financial and technical staff will be organized.

=== Foreign Non-governmental Organizations ===
Unlike other lower and middle-income countries, Iran hosts few private international non-governmental organizations that pursue environmental or social aims. Despite the difficult operating environment and friction with ruling bodies, the Iranian Government has moved to encourage an increased participation by foreign NGOs. As a result, some organizations that closed operations have resumed their activities, and new startup organizations, including those that work in the areas of water and sanitation, have initiated projects in Iran. One such organization, Healing For Iran, recently launched a program to improve rural access to water and investigate the causes of water contamination in disadvantaged populations.

=== World Bank ===
The World Bank was engaged in water and sanitation in the Islamic Republic of Iran between 2000 and 2010. Its engagement began with the approval of the Tehran Sewerage Project in 2000, followed by the approval of two other projects in 2004 and 2005. In 2010 its last project, The Northern Cities Water Supply and Sanitation Project, closed. The project, supported by a US$224m loan, aimed to enhance the quality of life in the four northern cities of Rasht and Anzali in Gilan province, as well as Sari and Babol in Mazandaran province. It aimed to do so by improving the operational efficiency and financial sustainability of the two Provincial Water and Wastewater Companies (WWCs). The project financed the extension and improvement of water distribution systems including metering, sanitary sewers, and a wastewater treatment plant (in Sari) which was not completed at project closure. The project did not succeed in improving the financial situation of the two water and wastewater companies, since tariff increases were delayed.

The Ahvaz and Shiraz Water Supply and Sanitation Project, supported by a US$279m loan approved in 2004 and closed in 2009, aimed to improve access to satisfactory water supply and significantly increasing coverage of sanitation services; and improve environmental, hygiene and health conditions, as well as promoting reuse of treated effluents. It also aimed to strengthen and develop the capacity of Ahvaz and Shiraz Water and Wastewater Companies, and assist the latter in improving their efficiency, sustainability and financial autonomy. It also aimed to initiate sector reforms, particularly with respect to institutional arrangements, the regulatory framework, demand management, as well as prepare a sanitation strategy.

The Tehran Sewerage Project, supported by a US$145m loan, closed in 2008. Its objective was to improve the environmental conditions in the Greater Tehran area through the installation of wastewater collection and treatment facilities, to improve public health, and enable unrestricted irrigation practices in the surrounding areas. Chlorination would disinfect effluents treated at the secondary level for suitable irrigation purposes, and a further tertiary treatment was to be extended if required. Treated effluents, and sludge were to be reused for agricultural purposes. The project allowed to connect more than 1.3 million people to the sewer system and to build a wastewater treatment plant that was completed in June 2009. A World Bank completion report concluded that the project reached its objectives and performed satisfactorily.

The World Bank says that international financial institutions are exempt from the sanctions imposed by the UN on Iran. In September 2013, the World Bank removed Iran from its list of borrowers that cannot receive new loans, saying the Islamic Republic had paid outstanding loan amounts. In April 2014, Iranian Finance and Economic Affairs Minister Ali Tayyebnia asked the World Bank to provide Iran with financial assistance to implement development projects.

== See also ==
- List of reservoirs and dams in Iran
- Agriculture in Iran
- Traditional water sources of Persian antiquity
- International rankings of Iran
