= 2020s in Asia =

Events from the decade 2020s in Asia.

== History by country ==
=== Afghanistan ===
The United States–Taliban deal, officially known as the Agreement for Bringing Peace to Afghanistan between the United States and the Islamic Emirate of Afghanistan (which is not recognized by the United States as a state and is known as the Taliban) and commonly known as the Doha Accords, was a peace agreement signed by the United States and the Taliban on 29 February 2020 in Doha, Qatar, with intent to bring an end to the 2001–2021 war in Afghanistan. Negotiated for the U.S. by Zalmay Khalilzad for the first Trump administration, the negotiations for the agreement did not involve the Islamic Republic of Afghanistan, the Afghan government at the time. The deal, which also had secret annexes, was one of the critical events that caused the collapse of the Afghan National Defense and Security Forces (ANDSF). Adhering to the conditions of the deal, the U.S. dramatically reduced the number of U.S. air raids, leaving the ANDSF without a key advantage in keeping the Taliban at bay. This resulted in "a sense of abandonment within the ANDSF and the Afghan population" according to a report by the Special Inspector General for Afghanistan Reconstruction (SIGAR). ANDSF was ill-prepared to sustain security following a U.S. withdrawal, which allowed for the Taliban insurgency, ultimately leading to the Taliban takeover of Kabul on 15 August 2021.

The agreement stipulated fighting restrictions for both the U.S. and the Taliban, and provided for the withdrawal of all NATO forces from Afghanistan in return for the Taliban's counter-terrorism commitments. The U.S. agreed to an initial reduction of its force level from 13,000 to 8,600 within 135 days (i.e. by July 2020), followed by a full withdrawal within 14 months (i.e. by 1 May 2021) if the Taliban kept its commitments. The United States also committed to closing five military bases within 135 days, and expressed its intent to end economic sanctions on the Taliban by August 27, 2020. The agreement was welcomed by Pakistan, China, Russia and India, and unanimously endorsed by the UN Security Council.

Insurgent attacks against the Afghan security forces surged in the aftermath of the deal, however, with thousands killed. Regardless, withdrawals per the agreement continued. By January 2021, just 2,500 U.S. troops remained in the country, and NATO forces fully evacuated by the end of that summer. The U.S. completed its full evacuation on August 30, 2021, as the Taliban took control of the country by force.

Critics of the deal said that the then-incumbent Trump administration appeased the Taliban and ignored the then Afghan government for a quick withdrawal from Afghanistan.

The United States Department of Defense completed its withdrawal from Afghanistan on 30 August 2021. This helped bring to a close the 2001–2021 war. In February 2020, the first Trump administration and the Taliban signed the United States–Taliban deal in Doha, Qatar, which stipulated fighting restrictions for both the US and the Taliban, and in return for the Taliban's counter-terrorism commitments, provided for the withdrawal of all NATO forces from Afghanistan by 1 May 2021. Following the deal, the US dramatically reduced the number of air attacks on the Taliban to the detriment of the Afghan National Security Forces (ANSF), and its fight against the Taliban insurgency.

The Biden administration's final decision in April 2021 was to begin the withdrawal on 1 May 2021, but the final pull-out of all US troops was delayed until September 2021, triggering the start of the collapse of the ANSF. This collapse led to the Taliban takeover of Kabul on 15 August 2021.

As part of the United States–Taliban deal, the Trump administration agreed to an initial reduction of US forces from 13,000 to 8,600 troops by July 2020, followed by a complete withdrawal by 1 May 2021, if the Taliban kept its commitments. At the start of the Biden administration, there were 2,500 US soldiers remaining in Afghanistan and, in April 2021, Biden said the US would not begin withdrawing these soldiers before 1 May, but would complete the withdrawal symbolically by 11 September. The Taliban began a final offensive on 1 May and, on 8 July, Biden moved up the completion date to 31 August. There were about 650 US troops in Afghanistan in early August 2021, tasked with protecting Hamid Karzai International Airport and the US Embassy in Kabul. NATO's Resolute Support Mission concluded on 12 July 2021 while US intelligence assessments estimated as late as July that Kabul would fall within months or weeks following withdrawal of all American forces from Afghanistan, the security situation deteriorated rapidly.

The US also launched Operation Allies Refuge to airlift the American translators and select Afghan citizens considered at risk of reprisals and US Forces Afghanistan Forward was established on 7 July 2021 as a successor command overseeing the evacuation of all American diplomatic, security, advisory, and counter-terrorism personnel remaining in the country after the withdrawal of US troops. On 12 August 2021, following continued Taliban victories across Afghanistan, the Biden administration announced that 3,000 US troops would be deployed to Kabul Airport to evacuate embassy personnel, US nationals and Special Immigrant Visa applicants. With the rapid advance of the Taliban in the provinces, on 14 August the US increased its troop commitment to 5,000. On 15 August, with the fall of Kabul, another 1,000 troops were deployed, and on 16 August, a further 1,000 troops were deployed, bringing the total number of troops to 7,000. The last US military planes left Kabul airport at 11:59 p.m. Kabul time on 30 August 2021.

The US withdrawal was widely described as "disastrous", with around one thousand American citizens and Afghans holding visas left behind in the country. On 28 and 29 September 2021, US secretary of defense Lloyd Austin, Chairman of the Joint Chiefs of Staff Gen. Mark Milley and United States Central Command (CENTCOM) commander Gen. Frank McKenzie were among the numerous Defense Department officials who denied during congressional testimonies President Biden's previous claim that his decision to withdraw troops from Afghanistan was because of advice from senior US military leaders and stated that they had in fact advised him to keep some troops in Afghanistan.

=== Armenia ===
Following the 2020 Nagorno-Karabakh ceasefire agreement, Armenian forces were to withdraw from Armenian-occupied territories surrounding Nagorno-Karabakh by 1 December. An approximately 2,000-strong Russian peacekeeping force from the Russian Ground Forces was to be deployed to the region for a minimum of five years, one of its task being protection of the Lachin corridor, which links Armenia and the Nagorno-Karabakh region. Additionally, Armenia undertook to "guarantee safety" of passage between mainland Azerbaijan and its Nakhchivan exclave via a strip of land in Armenia's Syunik Province. Russian FSB′s Border Troops would exercise control over the transport communication.

Shortly after the news about the signing the ceasefire agreement broke in the early hours of 10 November, violent protests erupted in Armenia against Nikol Pashinyan, claiming he was a "traitor" for having accepted the peace deal. Protesters also seized the parliament building by breaking a metal door, and pulled the President of the National Assembly of Armenia Ararat Mirzoyan from a car and beat him. Throughout November, numerous Armenian officials resigned from their posts, including the Armenian minister of foreign affairs, Zohrab Mnatsakanyan, the minister of defence, David Tonoyan, head of the same ministry's military control service, Movses Hakobyan, and the spokesman of Armenia's Defense Ministry, Artsrun Hovhannisyan.

Prime Minister Nikol Pashinyan accused Chief of the General Staff of the Armenian Armed Forces Onik Gasparyan and more than 40 other high-ranking military officers of attempting a coup after they published a statement calling for Pashinyan's resignation on 25 February 2021. Two days later Armenian President Armen Sarksyan refused the order from Prime Minister Nikol Pashinyan to dismiss Onik Gasparyan, saying parts of the decree were in violation of the constitution. Pashinyan immediately resent the motion to dismiss Gasparyan to the president. On 27 February, more than 15,000 protested in the capital Yerevan calling for Pashinyan to resign.

=== China ===
Under CCP General Secretary Xi Jinping's administration, China promoted "common prosperity", a series of policies designed with stated goal to increase equality, and used the term to justify a broad crackdown and major slew of regulations against the tech and tutoring sectors in 2021. Often described as an authoritarian leader by political and academic observers, Xi's tenure has seen an increase of censorship and mass surveillance, a deterioration in human rights including re-education camps in Xinjiang, and a cult of personality developing around him. Xi's political thoughts have been incorporated into the party and national constitutions, and he has emphasized the importance of national security and the need for CCP leadership over the country. He and the CCP Central Committee additionally passed a "historical resolution" in November 2021, the third such resolution after Mao Zedong and Deng Xiaoping, further consolidating his power.

=== Hong Kong ===
The Hong Kong protests against the Chinese government continued into 2020. A controversial new national security law was enacted on 30 June 2020 by the Standing Committee of the National People's Congress. In July, 12 politicians were banned from standing the upcoming elections. The elections were then postponed by a year, officially due to the COVID-19 pandemic. After the arrest of eight opposition politicians in November, 15 other opposition lawmakers resigned in protest, including the remaining opposition members of the Legislative Council of Hong Kong. The democracy activist Joshua Wong was also arrested, facing up to three years in prison in his trial.

The Decision of the National People's Congress on Improving the Electoral System of the Hong Kong Special Administrative Region was enacted on 11 March 2021 by the National People's Congress (NPC), the de jure legislative body of the People's Republic of China (PRC), to rewrite the electoral rules, imposing a much restrictive electoral system on the Hong Kong Special Administrative Region (HKSAR) for its Chief Executive (CE) and the Legislative Council (LegCo), claiming to ensure a system of "patriots governing Hong Kong." Police later arrested five executives of the Apple Daily newspaper as the newspaper warned that press freedom in the city was "hanging by a thread".

The Stand News raids and arrests occurred on 29 December 2021, when Stand News, one of the few remaining pro-democracy media outlets in Hong Kong following the passage of the Hong Kong national security law in 2020, was raided by the National Security Department of the Hong Kong Police Force. Media executives and journalists were arrested on the charge of "conspiring to publish seditious publications" on a large scale. As a result of the raid, Stand News ceased operations, the organisation's website and social media became inactive, and all of its employees were dismissed. The Office of the United Nations High Commissioner for Human Rights, along with leaders in Canada, Germany, the United Kingdom and United States, condemned the raid.

=== India ===
Narendra Modi of the Bharatiya Janata Party became prime minister in the 2014 Indian general election, in which the party gained a majority in the lower house of the Indian parliament the Lok Sabha; it was the first time for any single party since 1984. His administration has tried to raise direct foreign investment in the Indian economy, and reduced spending on healthcare, education, and social-welfare programmes. He centralised power by abolishing the Planning Commission and replacing it with the NITI Aayog. Modi began a high-profile sanitation campaign, controversially initiated the 2016 demonetisation of high-denomination banknotes and introduced the Goods and Services Tax (GST), and weakened or abolished environmental and labour laws. Modi oversaw India's response to the COVID-19 pandemic. As prime minister, he has received consistently high approval ratings.

Under Modi's tenure, India has experienced democratic backsliding. (Note: Sources describing that India has experienced a backslide in democracy:) Following his party's victory in the 2019 general election, his administration revoked the special status of Jammu and Kashmir, introduced the Citizenship Amendment Act and three controversial farm laws, prompting widespread protests and sit-ins across the country, resulting in a formal repeal of the latter. Modi has been described as engineering a political realignment towards right-wing politics and remains a controversial figure, domestically and internationally, over his Hindu nationalist beliefs and handling of the 2002 Gujarat riots, which have been cited as evidence of a majoritarian and exclusionary social agenda. (Note: Sources discussing the controversy surrounding Modi.)

The Citizenship Amendment Act protests occurred after the enactment of the Citizenship (Amendment) Act (CAA) by the Indian government on 12 December 2019, which triggered widespread ongoing protests across India and abroad against the act and the associated proposals to enact a National Register of Citizens (NRC). The Amendment created a pathway to Indian citizenship for illegal migrants belonging to Hindu, Sikh, Buddhist, Jain, Parsi, and Christian communities from Pakistan, Bangladesh and Afghanistan, who had entered India before 2014 fleeing religious persecution. The Amendment does not provide the same pathway to Muslims and others from these countries, nor to refugee Sri Lankan Tamils in India, Rohingyas from Myanmar, or Buddhists from Tibet. The proposed National Register of Citizens (NRC) will be an official record of all legal citizens of India; individuals would need to provide a prescribed set of documents issued before a specified cutoff date to be included in it. The amendment has been widely criticised as discriminating on the basis of religion, in particular for excluding Muslims. Protestors against the amendment demand that it be scrapped and that the nationwide NRC not be implemented. Protesters in Assam and other northeastern states do not want Indian citizenship to be granted to any refugee or immigrant, regardless of their religion, as they fear it would alter the region's demographic balance.

Prime Minister Narendra Modi dismissed 12 cabinet ministers, including Health Minister Harsh Vardhan, following intense criticisms over his handling of the COVID-19 pandemic. Ravi Shankar Prasad, who held multiple concurrent positions as Law, Information Technology, and Communications Minister, also resigned.

=== Iran ===
The 2019–2020 Iranian protests were a series of nationwide civil protests in Iran, initially caused by a 50%–200% increase in fuel prices, becoming the most violent and severe anti-government unrest since the rise of Iran's Islamic Republic in 1979. As many as 1,500 Iranian protesters were killed. The government crackdown prompted a violent reaction from protesters who destroyed 731 government banks including Iran's central bank, nine Islamic religious centres, tore down anti-American billboards, and posters and statues of the Supreme Leader Ali Khamenei as well as former leader Khomeini. Fifty government military bases were also attacked by protesters.

In January 2020, the United States assassinated the commander of the Quds Force of the Islamic Revolutionary Guard Corps, general Qasem Soleimani. This led to an Iranian missile strike against bases housing US troops in Iraq five days later. As a result of expectations of a US retribution, the Iranian air defence system accidentally shot down Ukraine International Airlines Flight 752, killing all 176 people on board. The International Maritime Security Construct was set up by the US to prevent Iran from disrupting international shipping in the Strait of Hormuz. Israel was suspected of being behind at least five explosions and fires at Iranian nuclear sites in the summer of 2020. The leading nuclear scientist of the country, Mohsen Fakhrizadeh, was assassinated on 27 November 2020, with Iran blaming Israel for the attack.

The sequence of protests which included the 2019-2020 Iranian protests, 2021–2022 Iranian protests, and the Mahsa Amini protests was met with violent responses by the Iranian authorities, including the killing of 1,500 protesters in November 2019 uprising and the violent crackdown on protests in Mahshahr. The protests, which have occurred at various stages and times since the mid-2010s, increasing in both support and number each time, have found popular support amongst many Iranians. They have the intention of removing the Iranian government and addressing both economic and social issues within Iran, and are often fueled by low wages, unemployment, inflation, government corruption, an ongoing water crisis, disillusion amongst Iranian youth and by their Burnt Generation parents with the government's Islamist, anti-Western outlook, the isolation of Iran internationally, Persian nationalist fervor and the government's handling of the COVID-19 pandemic.

==== 2022 Mahsa Amini protests ====
Civil unrest and protests against the government of the Islamic Republic of Iran associated with the death in police custody of Mahsa Amini (Persian: مهسا امینی) began on 16 September 2022 and carried on into 2023, but by spring 2023, the protests had largely subsided, ultimately leaving the political leadership unchanged and firmly entrenched in power. The protests were described as "unlike any the country had seen before", the "biggest challenge" to the government, and "most widespread revolt" since the Islamic Revolution in 1979.

Amini was arrested by the Guidance Patrol on 13 September 2022 for allegedly violating Iran's mandatory hijab law by wearing her hijab "improperly" while visiting Tehran from Saqqez. According to eyewitnesses, she was severely beaten by Guidance Patrol officers (this was denied by Iranian authorities). She subsequently collapsed, was hospitalized and died three days later. As the protests spread from Amini's hometown of Saqqez to other cities in the Iranian Kurdistan and throughout Iran, the government responded with widespread Internet blackouts, nationwide restrictions on social media usage, tear gas and gunfire.

Although the protests have not been as deadly as those in 2019 (when more than 1,500 were killed), they have been "nationwide, spread across social classes, universities, the streets [and] schools". At least 551 people, including 68 minors, had been killed as a result of the government's intervention in the protests, as of 15 September 2023. (Note: according to the non-profit organization Iran Human Rights) Before February 2023 when most were pardoned, an estimated 19,262 were arrested (Note: according to HRANA, as of 6 January 2023) across at least 134 cities and towns and 132 universities. (Note: according to HRANA as of 4 November 2022)

Female protesters, including schoolchildren, have played a key role in the demonstrations. In addition to demands for increased rights for women, the protests have demanded the overthrow of the Islamic Republic, setting them apart from previous major protest movements in Iran, which have focused on election results or economic woes. The government's response to the protests and its "brutal and disproportionate use of force against peaceful protesters and children" was widely condemned, but Supreme Leader of Iran Ali Khamenei dismissed the unrest as "riots" and part of a "hybrid war" against Iran created by foreign enemy states and dissidents abroad.

On 2 February 2024, the UN Human Rights Council's Fact-Finding Mission released a report which found the Iranian regime committed systematic crimes against humanity.

On 16 September 2026, Amnesty International reported that the Iranian regime instigated the killing, torture, and sexual abuse of protesters during the Mahsa Amini protests, adding that the subsequent suppression of the 2025–2026 Iranian protests exhibited similar characteristics, but on a larger scale.

=== Iraq ===
In 2020–21, demonstrations took place in Baghdad and other parts of Iraq, over popular discontent with government corruption, unemployment, poor government services, and foreign interference within Iraq. Reports said that 450 protesters had been fatally shot by security forces. Major protests were based in Nasiriyah in Dhi Qar province, with hundreds of protesters arriving there from other cities. New clashes erupted in Baghdad between protesters and security forces, with security forces using gunfire against protesters. One march included more than 1,000 students.

In March 2020, Mohammed Allawi sent a letter to the President of Iraq, stating that he had to decline to take office as prime minister since the Iraqi Parliament had declined to approve his cabinet. Reports indicated that the crowds of protesters in Baghdad had expressed widespread opposition to Allawi.

Mustafa Al-Kadhimi was named by President Barham Salih as prime minister-designate, the third person tapped to lead the country in just 10 weeks as it struggled to replace a government that fell last year after months of protests. Kadhimi was nominated by President Barham Salih, state television reported, shortly after the previous designated prime minister, Adnan al-Zurfi, announced he was withdrawing having failed to secure enough support to pass a government. After nearly six months of political negotiations, Iraq's parliament confirmed al-Kadhimi as Prime Minister of Iraq on 6 May 2020. Before entering office, al-Kadhimi said his government would be a government that finds solutions to Iraq's many problems and not a crisis ridden government. He promised early elections and vowed Iraq would not be used as a battleground by other countries. He assumed office on the heels of major upheavals in Iraq - protests, falling oil prices, and the COVID-19 pandemic.

Parliamentary elections were held in Iraq on 10 October 2021. Iraqis who were supporters of the Iran-backed PMF and Fatah Alliance called the results "a fraud", as most Iran-backed parties, including Fatah Alliance, lost many seats. Following the election, clashes between Iraqi protesters and security forces left more than 125 injured and 2 dead. The protestors were supporters of Iran-backed militias and political parties. Two days later on the 7 November, an assassination attempt was made on Prime Minister Mustafa Al-Kadhimi via a drone strike. The PM survived the attack unharmed but resulted in six of his bodyguards being injured. The security forces reportedly opened fire on demonstrators, leading to at least one death. It was rumored that the assassination attempt was connected to these protests.

=== Israel–Palestine ===
The political crisis in Israel continued, with the fourth election within two years held in 2021. The rotation government established after the third elections between the competing factions of Likud and Blue and White collapsed. In foreign relations, the country signed the Abraham Accords (also in 2020), leading to the Bahrain–Israel and Israel–United Arab Emirates normalization agreements. Sudan also announced that it would be normalizing relations with the country as did Morocco. The Israeli Prime Minister Benjamin Netanyahu also met with Saudi Arabia's crown prince Mohammed bin Salman soon after.

The 2021 Palestinian legislative election for the Palestinian Legislative Council, originally scheduled for 22 May 2021, according to a decree by President Mahmoud Abbas on 15 January 2021, was indefinitely postponed. President Abbas announced the postponement on 29 April 2021, stating the following: "Facing this difficult situation, we decided to postpone the date of holding legislative elections until the participation of Jerusalem and its people is guaranteed."

Mahmoud Abbas was elected President of the Palestinian National Authority on 9 January 2005 for a four-year term that ended on 9 January 2009. The last elections for the Palestinian Legislative Council were held on 25 January 2006. There have not been any elections either for president or for the legislature since these two elections.

The 2021 Israel–Palestine crisis started on 6 May 2021, with Palestinians protesting in Jerusalem over a forthcoming decision of the Israeli Supreme Court regarding the eviction of four Palestinian families from Sheikh Jarrah, a neighbourhood of East Jerusalem. The protests quickly escalated into violent confrontations between Israeli and Palestinian protesters. The following day, the major Islamic holy site and the holiest to Judaism, known as the Al-Aqsa Mosque compound (the Temple Mount), was stormed by the Israeli police using tear gas, rubber bullets and stun grenades against firecrackers and stone-throwing Palestinians. On 10 May, two Palestinian militant groups, Hamas and Palestinian Islamic Jihad, began firing rockets into Israel from the Gaza Strip, hitting multiple residences and a school. Israel launched airstrikes against Gaza, including airstrikes targeting multiple apartment buildings, a refugee camp, and a news office building.

As part of the crisis, widespread protests and riots occurred across Israel, particularly in cities with large Arab populations. In Lod, rocks were thrown at Jewish apartments and some Jewish residents were evacuated from their homes by the police. One man was seriously injured after being struck in the head by a rock. In the nearby city of Ramle, Jewish rioters threw rocks at passing vehicles. On 11 May, Mayor of Lod Yair Revivio urged Prime Minister of Israel Benjamin Netanyahu to deploy Israel Border Police in the city, stating that the city had "completely lost control" and warning that the country was on the brink of "civil war". Netanyahu declared a state of emergency in Lod on 11 May, marking the first time since 1966 that Israel has used emergency powers over an Arab community. Minister of Public Security Amir Ohana announced the implementation of emergency orders.

Following the unrest, Yair Lapid, leader of the Yesh Atid political party and the Israeli opposition, informed outgoing President Reuven Rivlin that he and Yamina leader Naftali Bennett had reached a deal to form a coalition government, which would remove Netanyahu from power. Mansour Abbas, leader of the United Arab List party, agreed to join the coalition. On 2 June 2021, a coalition agreement was signed between Yesh Atid, Blue and White, Yamina, the Labor Party, Yisrael Beiteinu, New Hope, Meretz, and the United Arab List, with the new government sworn in on 13 June.

On 20 June 2022, a little over a year after the coalition government was sworn in, Bennett and Lapid announced that they would begin the process of dissolving the government, thus sending Israel to a fifth round of elections in less than four years. The election was scheduled for 1 November, with Lapid serving as interim prime minister until then. This election saw the national camp win a majority of seats in the Knesset, likely returning Netanyahu to the post of prime minister. Increases in the number of MKs for Likud and the Religious Zionist Party was attributed to a lack of support for liberal wing and Arab parties, most notably the failure of Meretz to cross the electoral threshold to qualify for parliamentary representation. Following a two-month negotiation period, on 21 December, Netanyahu announced that he had succeeded in forming the new coalition. The thirty-seventh government of Israel was sworn in on 29 December. Some of the government's policy proposals, including a flagship program centered around reforms in the judicial branch, have drawn widespread criticism, both in Israel and abroad, sparking waves of protests across the country.

=== Kazakhstan ===
Protests broke out on 2 January 2022 after a sudden sharp increase in gas prices which, according to the Kazakh government, was due to high demand and price fixing. The protests began in Zhanaozen, a city built on an oil field, but quickly spread to other cities in the country, including the largest city, Almaty. Growing discontent with the government and former president Nursultan Nazarbayev also influenced larger demonstrations. As there were no popular opposition groups against the Kazakh government, the unrest appeared to be assembled directly by citizens. In response, President Kassym-Jomart Tokayev declared a state of emergency in Mangystau Region and Almaty, effective from 5 January. The Mamin Cabinet resigned the same day.

In response to the unrest, the Collective Security Treaty Organization (CSTO) – a military alliance of post-Soviet states that includes Armenia, Belarus, Kyrgyzstan, Russia, Tajikistan, and Kazakhstan itself – agreed to deploy peacekeeping troops in Kazakhstan. The local police reported that "dozens of attackers were liquidated", while former President Nazarbayev was removed as the Chairman of the Security Council of Kazakhstan. Tokayev later announced a series of reforms to the national parliament, including re-establishing the Constitutional Court, reducing the membership requirement for establishing political parties from 20,000 to 5,000, reducing the number of parliament deputies appointed by the president, and restoring three regions that were merged during the 1990s. He says that the purpose of these reforms is to move the current political system from "superpresidential" rule to a presidential republic with a strong parliament.

=== Kyrgyzstan ===
The 2020 Kyrgyzstani protests began on 5 October 2020 in response to the recent parliamentary election that was perceived by protestors as unfair, with allegations of vote rigging. The results of the election were annulled on 6 October 2020. On 12 October 2020, President Jeenbekov announced a state of emergency in the capital city of Bishkek, which was approved by Parliament the following day. Jeenbekov resigned on 15 October 2020.

In January 2021 a referendum on the form of government was held alongside presidential elections (won by Sadyr Japarov), with voters asked whether they would prefer a presidential system, a parliamentary system, or opposed both. Just over 84% voted in favour of a presidential system.

Work began on drafting a new constitution, which was debated in the Supreme Council in February 2021. The draft new constitution replaces the parliamentary system with a presidential one, with presidents limited to two five years terms instead of a single six-year term. It also reduces the number of seats in the Supreme Council from 120 to 90 and establishes a constitutional court.

In March 2021 members of the Supreme Council passed a bill, scheduling a referendum on the new constitution for 11 April, the same day as local elections. The result was 79.31% in favour.

=== Lebanon ===
The 17 October Protests, commonly referred to as the 17 October Revolution or Hirak or Thawrah (Arabic: ثورة 17 تشرين الأول, romanized: thawrat 17 tishrīn al-ʾawwal, lit. '17 October revolution'), were a series of civil protests in Lebanon that began after the Lebanese cabinet announced financial measures on 17 October 2019. These nationwide protests were triggered by planned taxes on gasoline, tobacco, and VoIP calls on applications such as WhatsApp, but quickly expanded into a country-wide condemnation of sectarian rule, the stagnation of the economy, unemployment (which reached 46% in 2018), endemic corruption in the public sector, legislation that was perceived to shield the ruling class from accountability (such as banking secrecy) and failures of the government to provide basic services, such as electricity, water, and sanitation.

The protests created a political crisis in Lebanon, with Prime Minister Saad Hariri tendering his resignation, not demanding any new governmental needs of being the prime minister and echoing protesters' demands for a government of independent specialists. A cabinet headed by Hassan Diab was formed in 2020 but also resigned in the wake of the 2020 Beirut explosion.

Calling for a complete regime change, it was known by its most famous slogan; Kellon Yaani Kellon (Arabic: كلن يعني كلن, lit. 'all of them [the elites] means all of them').

In January 2026 public schools teachers and retired military personnel took to the streets closings roads all over Lebanon and protesting in front of the Lebanese parliament building.

The Lebanese liquidity crisis is an ongoing financial crisis affecting Lebanon, that became fully apparent in August 2019, and was further exacerbated by the COVID-19 pandemic in Lebanon (which began in February 2020), the 2020 Beirut port explosion and the Russian invasion of Ukraine. The country experienced liquidity shortages in the years prior to 2019 but the full extent of the fragility of the economy was concealed through financial engineering by the governor of the central bank. Lebanon's crisis was worsened by sanctions targeting Syria's former government and Iran-backed Hezbollah, which intensified under President Donald Trump.

The currency was devalued by over 98% between January 2023 and March 2024, with an annual inflation rate of 221.3% in 2023. Public services have collapsed; without using a private generator, households can expect only an hour or so of power a day. Shortages of drinking water have contributed to disease outbreaks, including the first cholera cases in decades. Parents are sending their children to orphanages because they cannot feed them. A growing number of citizens have resorted to armed robbery as the only way to extract their own deposits (now vastly reduced in real terms) from banks when they desperately need to pay for basic services such as healthcare. The collapse of Lebanon, formerly known as the "Paris of the Middle East", has been described by Western media as one of the most devastating and worst financial recessions since at least the 19th century.

=== Malaysia ===
In early 2020, officials from the Malaysia's Prime Minister's Office (PMO) said that Malaysia has recovered US$322 million stolen from the sovereign wealth fund 1Malaysia Development Berhad scandal, a fraction of the more than US$4.5 billion US prosecutors say was looted. In April, the US Department of Justice returned US$300 million in funds stolen during the 1MDB scandal to Malaysia. Former prime minister Najib Razak was found guilty of one count of abuse of power, three counts of criminal breach of trust, three counts of money laundering, a total of seven charges for the SRC International trial.

On 24 February 2020, Malaysia entered the 2020 Malaysian political crisis for almost a week after the resignation of the 7th Prime Minister of Malaysia, Mahathir Mohamad. Immediately that afternoon, the King of Malaysia re-appointed Mahathir Mohamad as the Interim Prime Minister to solve the political crisis. On 29 February 2020, Yang Dipertuan Agong, King Abdullah of Pahang agreed to appoint Tan Sri Muhyiddin Yassin as the 8th Prime Minister of Malaysia, and he was sworn in at the Istana Negara on 1 March 2020.

Malaysia declared a State of Emergency in January 2021 amid the worsening COVID-19 pandemic, suspending parliament and all elections until August. The declaration attracted political controversy; a number of MPs from major coalition party UMNO withdrew support for the government in disapproval, temporarily leading to a minority government and destabilising the coalition. On 8 July 2021, the President of UMNO announced that the party had withdrawn support for Prime Minister Muhyiddin Yassin over the government's handling of the COVID-19 pandemic although others in UMNO later affirmed their support, splitting the party and putting the government's status into question. After losing majority support and attempts to regain it were unsuccessful, Prime Minister Muhyiddin and his cabinet resigned on 16 August 2021 with Muhyiddin remaining as caretaker prime minister. Four days later, UMNO's Vice President Ismail Sabri Yaakob was appointed prime minister by the Yang di-Pertuan Agong after receiving support from most of the MPs.

=== Myanmar ===
General elections were held in Myanmar on 8 November 2020, in which the National League for Democracy won 396 out of 476 seats in parliament, while the military's proxy party, the Union Solidarity and Development Party, won only 33 seats. In the 2021 Myanmar coup d'état, democratically elected members of the ruling National League for Democracy were detained and/or deposed from their offices by the Tatmadaw; Myanmar's military. The Tatmadaw declared a year-long state of emergency and declared power had been vested in the commander-in-chief of the armed forces, Min Aung Hlaing. The coup d'état occurred the day before the Parliament of Myanmar was due to swear in the members elected at the November 2020 general election, preventing this from occurring. President Win Myint and State Counsellor Aung San Suu Kyi were detained, along with ministers and their deputies and members of Parliament. Domestic civil resistance efforts in Myanmar, known locally as the Spring Revolution (Burmese: နွေဦးတော်လှန်ရေး), began in opposition to the coup d'état on 1 February. As of 2 April 2021, at least 550 civilians, including children, have been killed by military or police forces and at least 2,574 people detained.

The National Unity Government of the Republic of the Union of Myanmar was formed by the Committee Representing Pyidaungsu Hluttaw, a group of elected lawmakers ousted in the coup d'état. It included representatives of the National League for Democracy (the deposed ruling party of former state counsellor Aung San Suu Kyi), ethnic minority insurgent groups, and various minor parties. The NUG has sought international recognition as the government of Myanmar. On 5 May 2021, the NUG announced the formation of "People's Defense Force" as its armed wing to launch an armed revolution against the military junta.

=== Mongolia ===
Parliamentary elections in June 2020 resulted in a victory for the ruling Mongolian People's Party. The Prime Minister Ukhnaagiin Khürelsükh resigned on 27 January 2021 following a minor protest against the mistreatment of a hospital patient.

=== Nepal ===
In July 2021, the Nepalese Supreme Court declared that the dissolution of the Federal Parliament of Nepal by Prime Minister KP Sharma Oli in May was unconstitutional, reinstating the Parliament and removing the duties of Oli. The Supreme Court also designated leader of the opposition Sher Bahadur Deuba as the new prime minister.

=== Pakistan ===
A political and constitutional crisis emerged in Pakistan when, on 3 April 2022, National Assembly Deputy Speaker Qasim Khan Suri dismissed a no-confidence motion against prime minister Imran Khan during a session in which it was expected to be taken up for a vote. Moments later, the president dissolved the National Assembly on the advice of prime minister Imran Khan. This created a constitutional crisis, as effectively, Imran Khan led a constitutional coup to remain in power.

Four days later, the Supreme Court of Pakistan ruled that the dismissal of the no-confidence motion and subsequent dissolution of the National Assembly were unconstitutional, and overturned these actions. The Supreme Court further held that the National Assembly had not been prorogued and had to be reconvened by the Speaker immediately. Shortly after midnight on 10 April, the National Assembly voted and passed the No Confidence motion removing prime minister Khan from office immediately upon passing of the resolution and making him the first prime minister in Pakistan to be so removed from office.

Imran Khan was arrested by the police from Islamabad High Court on 9 May 2023. Khan's arrest led to a nationwide protest by his supporters. PTI supporters had reportedly indulged into violence to stage their protest against this arrest. Social media platforms including Twitter, Facebook and others were blocked in the country. but was later released by Supreme Court two days later. On 5 August 2023, Imran Khan was again arrested on the charges of selling state gifts and was sentenced to three years jail and five years of disqualification by the trial court Judge.

The 2024 Pakistani general election was accused of being rigged in favour of the PML-N's leader Nawaz Sharif. The US, UK, and European Union have spoken up about the concern of fairness of elections, as well as groups and members of the international community, while media outlets around the world denounced the election as "fraudulent". On 13 February 2024, leaders of PPP and PML-N, along with Shehbaz Sharif as prime minister, announced at a press conference that a coalition government would be started.

=== South Korea ===
On 14 December 2024, Yoon Suk Yeol, then president of South Korea, was impeached by the National Assembly following the passage of an impeachment bill with 204 of the 300 members voting in favor. This action came in response to Yoon's declaration of martial law on 3 December 2024.

Prime Minister Han Duck-soo assumed the role of acting president pending the Constitutional Court's decision on whether to accept the impeachment. Han was himself impeached on 27 December 2024, and first deputy prime minister Choi Sang-mok became acting president. On 24 March 2025, Han was acquitted by the Constitutional Court and returned to the role of acting president.

The court upheld the impeachment of Yoon in a unanimous 8–0 decision on 4 April 2025, removing Yoon from office. Thus, Han continued as acting president until resigning, along with Choi, on 1 May 2025, which left second deputy prime minister Lee Ju-ho as acting president. The court determined that Yoon's five major illegal acts, including ordering the military and police to block lawmakers from entering the National Assembly, ordering the arrest of judges and Supreme Court justices, and illegally declaring martial law, were serious violations of the Constitution. Per the Constitution, a snap election was held on 3 June 2025, 60 days after Yoon's removal, with Lee Jae Myung being elected to succeed Yoon as president.

An earlier impeachment motion was put to a parliamentary vote on 7 December 2024, but failed because the number of attending legislators did not meet the quorum required for its passage, as members of the ruling People Power Party boycotted the vote.

Opinion polling on the Yoon Suk Yeol presidency throughout 2024 was increasingly negative. The declaration of martial law hardened these views, with many surveyed in South Korea believing Yoon should resign voluntarily, or that he should be formally removed from office.

=== Sri Lanka ===
==== Economic crisis ====
The Sri Lankan economic crisis was an economic crisis in Sri Lanka that began in 2019 and ended in 2024. President Ranil Wickremasinghe is credited to this recovery. It was the island country's worst economic crisis since its independence in 1948. It had led to unprecedented levels of inflation, near-depletion of foreign exchange reserves, shortages of medical supplies, and an increase in prices of basic commodities. The crisis is said to have begun due to multiple compounding factors like tax cuts, money creation, a nationwide policy to shift to organic or biological farming, the 2019 Sri Lanka Easter bombings, and the impact of the COVID-19 pandemic in Sri Lanka. The subsequent economic hardships resulted in mass protests known as the Aragalaya. However, due to a credit line of $4 billion provided by the Indian government, the foreign currency reserves of Sri Lanka improved and reached $2.7 billion.

Sri Lanka had been earmarked for sovereign default, as the remaining foreign exchange reserves of US$1.9 billion as of March 2022 would not be sufficient to pay the country's foreign debt obligations for 2022, with $4 billion to be repaid. An International Sovereign Bond repayment of $1 billion was due to be paid by the government in July 2022. Bloomberg reported that Sri Lanka had a total of $8.6 billion in repayments due in 2022, including both local and foreign debt. In April 2022, the Sri Lankan government announced that it was defaulting, making it the first sovereign default and collapse in Sri Lankan history since its independence in 1948 and the first state in the Asia-Pacific region to enter sovereign default in the 21st century.

In June 2022, then Prime Minister Ranil Wickremesinghe said in parliament that the economy had collapsed, leaving it unable to pay for essentials.

In September 2022, a United Nations report said that the economic crisis is a result of officials' impunity for human rights abuses and economic crimes. According to the Sri Lankan finance ministry, the country's foreign reserves had grown by 23.5% from US$1.7 billion in September 2022 to US$2.1 billion in February 2023, representing a US$400 million increase.

==== Political crisis ====
The 2022 Sri Lankan political crisis was a political crisis in Sri Lanka due to the power struggle between President Gotabaya Rajapaksa and the people of Sri Lanka. It was fueled by the anti-government protests and demonstrations by the public due to the economic crisis in the country. The anti-government sentiment across various parts of Sri Lanka has triggered significant political instability in the nation.

The political crisis began on 3 April 2022, after all 26 members of the Second Gotabaya Rajapaksa cabinet with the exception of Prime Minister Rajapaksa resigned en masse overnight. Some critics argued that the resignation did not follow constitutional protocol, questioning its validity, and several were reinstated in different ministries the next day. There were even growing calls on forming a caretaker government to run the country or for snap elections, but the latter option was deemed unviable due to paper shortages and concerns over election expenditure, which would often cost in billions.

Protestors have taken to streets to show their anger and displeasure over the mismanagement of the economy by the government and the protestors urged the President Gotabaya to immediately step down for a political change; he refused to do so, later eventually fleeing to Singapore and resigning on 14 July. Main opposition Samagi Jana Balawegaya had determined to abolish the 20th amendment by bringing a private members Bill in order to scrap the executive powers of Executive Presidency.

==== Protests ====
The Aragalaya (Sinhala: අරගලය, lit. 'The Struggle') were a series of mass protests that began in March 2022 against the government of Sri Lanka. The government was heavily criticized for mismanaging the Sri Lankan economy, which led to a subsequent economic crisis involving severe inflation, daily blackouts, and a shortage of fuel, domestic gas, and other essential goods. The protesters' main demand was the resignation of President Gotabaya Rajapaksa and key officials from the Rajapaksa family. Despite the involvement of several opposition parties, most protesters considered themselves to be apolitical, with many expressing discontent with the parliamentary opposition. Protesters chanted slogans such as "Go Home Gota", "Go Home Rajapaksas", and "Aragalayata Jaya Wewa" ("Victory to the struggle"). Most protests were organized by the general public, with youths playing a major part by carrying out protests at Galle Face Green.

The government reacted to the protests with authoritarian methods, such as declaring a state of emergency, allowing the military to arrest civilians, imposing curfews, and restricting access to social media. The government violated the law and the Sri Lankan constitution by attempting to suppress the protests. The Sri Lankan diaspora also began demonstrations against the suppression of basic human rights in the country. In April, the government's ban on social media was perceived to have backfired; hashtags such as #GoHomeGota, which is believed to have been coined by an activist called Pathum Kerner in December 2021, had begun trending on Twitter internationally. The government's ban was lifted later that day. The Human Rights Commission of Sri Lanka condemned the government's actions and summoned officials responsible for the blocking and abuse of protesters.

On 3 April, all 26 members of the Second Gotabaya Rajapaksa cabinet resigned with the exception of Prime Minister Mahinda Rajapaksa. Critics said that the resignation was not valid as they did not follow constitutional protocol and several of the ministers who "resigned" were reinstated in different ministries the next day. Chief government whip Johnston Fernando insisted that President Gotabaya Rajapaksa would not resign under any circumstances. The protests, however, led to the removal of officials and ministers, including members of the Rajapaksa family and their close associates, and to the appointment of more qualified and veteran officials and the creation of the Advisory Group on Multilateral Engagement and Debt Sustainability.

In July 2022, protesters occupied the President's House in Colombo, causing Rajapaksa to flee and Prime Minister Ranil Wickremesinghe to announce his own willingness to resign. About a week later, on 20 July, Parliament elected Wickremesinghe as President. By November 2022, the protests had largely cooled off due to improvement in economic conditions. While the protests were mostly over, it was noted that it would take until 2026 for full economic recovery to be achieved.

=== Syria ===
On 27 November 2024, a coalition of Syrian opposition groups called the Military Operations Command, led by Hay'at Tahrir al-Sham (HTS) and supported by allied Turkish-backed groups in the Syrian National Army (SNA), launched an offensive against the Ba'athist regime's armed forces in Aleppo and Hama Governorates in Syria. Codenamed Deterrence of Aggression (Note: Arabic: ردع العدوان, romanized: Rade Aleudwan) by HTS, this was the first military offensive campaign launched by opposition forces in the Syrian civil war since the March 2020 Idlib ceasefire. On 29 November 2024, HTS entered Aleppo and captured most of the city, as the Syrian Arab Army (SAA) collapsed. The next day, opposition forces made rapid advances, capturing dozens of towns and villages as government forces disintegrated, and advanced toward Hama, subsequently capturing it on 5 December. This offensive begun a series of offensives that led to fall of Damascus.

=== Turkmenistan ===
Gurbanguly Berdimuhamedow stepped down as president on 19 March 2022, after a non-democratic snap presidential election, in which his son Serdar Berdimuhamedow won, becoming the next president and establishing a political dynasty.

=== Indonesia ===
An Indonesian general was killed by West Papuan separatists in April 2021.

=== Japan ===
On 8 July 2022, Shinzo Abe, a former prime minister of Japan and a serving member of the House of Representatives, was assassinated while speaking at a political event outside Yamato-Saidaiji Station in Nara, Nara Prefecture, Japan. While delivering a campaign speech for a Liberal Democratic Party (LDP) candidate, Abe was shot from behind at close range by a man with a homemade firearm. He was transported by medical helicopter to Nara Medical University Hospital, where he was pronounced dead.

=== Jordan ===
The 2021 Jordanian coup d'état attempt was a failed military coup attempt against King Abdullah II of Jordan. The former Crown Prince Prince Hamzah bin Hussein was placed under house arrest.

=== Lebanon ===
The 17 October Revolution continued, leading to the resignation of Prime Minister Saad Hariri, and then his successor Hassan Diab following the 2020 Beirut explosion. These events have also happened against the ongoing Lebanese liquidity crisis. Following being an interim prime minister, Saad Hariri resigned in July 2021 after both failing to form a new government in the past eight months and reaching an impasse with President Michel Aoun on adopting some constitutional amendments.

=== Qatar ===
General elections were held in Qatar for the first time on 2 October 2021, following an announcement by the Emir of Qatar on 22 August 2021. The elections for the Consultative Assembly were originally scheduled to be held in the second half of 2013, but were postponed in June 2013 until at least 2016. In 2016 they were postponed again. Finally in November 2020 Emir Tamim bin Hamad Al Thani pledged to hold the election in October 2021. The voter turnout during the election was 63.5%.

=== Syria ===
In early 2020, there was some evidence of new positive ties between the Syrian government and the Kurdish leaders in the autonomous region of Rojava, as the Kurds asked the Syrian government for help and protection against Turkish forces who invaded that region of Syria.

In June 2020, the Syrian pound underwent a dramatic collapse. The US Government stated via US Envoy James Jeffrey that the collapse would be exacerbated due to sanctions, and offered to help Assad if he agreed to meet certain conditions for political reform. On 10 June, hundreds of protesters returned to the streets of Sweida for the fourth consecutive day, rallying against the collapse of the country's economy, as the Syrian pound plummeted to 3,000 to the dollar within the past week. On 11 June, Prime Minister Imad Khamis was dismissed by President Bashar al-Assad, amid anti-government protests over deteriorating economic conditions. The new lows for the Syrian currency, and the dramatic increase in sanctions, began to appear to raise new threats to the survival of the Assad government. Analysts noted that a resolution to the current banking crisis in Lebanon might be crucial to restoring stability in Syria.

As of early 2022, Syria was still facing a major economic crisis due to sanctions and other economic pressures. there was some doubt of the Syrian government's ability to pay for subsidies for the population and for basic services and programs. The UN reported there were massive problems looming for Syria's ability to feed its population in the near future.

In one possibly positive sign for the well-being of Syria's population, several Arab countries began an effort to normalize relations with Syria, and to conclude a deal to provide energy supplies to Syria. This effort was led by Jordan, and included several other Arab countries.

=== Thailand ===
In Thailand, protests began in early 2020. Beginning first as demonstrations against the government of Prime Minister Prayut Chan-o-cha, it later included the unprecedented demands for reform of the Thai monarchy. The protests were initially triggered by the dissolution of the Future Forward Party (FFP) in late February 2020 which was critical of Prayut, the changes to the Thai constitution in 2017 and the country's political landscape that it gave rise to.

=== Turkey ===
In January 2020, Turkey announced it had sent troops to Libya in order to support the National Transitional Council in the Libyan Civil War, but that they would be in non-combat duties. In March 2020, Turkey started a military offensive against the Syrian Armed Forces as part of its intervention in the Syrian Civil War. That same month Turkey also declared that it would no longer stop migrants from entering the European Union. Turkey also supported the Azerbaijani side in the Second Nagorno-Karabakh War by supplying it with Syrian mercenaries and drones.

=== Uzbekistan ===
Protests broke out in the autonomous region of Karakalpakstan in Republic of Uzbekistan on 1 July 2022 over proposed amendments by Shavkat Mirziyoyev, the Uzbek President, to the Constitution of Uzbekistan, which would have ended Karakalpakstan's status as an autonomous region of Uzbekistan and right to secede from Uzbekistan via referendum. A day after protests had begun in the Karakalpak capital of Nukus, President Mirziyoyev withdrew the constitutional amendments. The Karakalpak government said that protesters had attempted to storm government buildings.

Despite concessions given by the Uzbek government in preserving Karakalpakstan's autonomy, protests continued growing, resulting in internet blockage throughout Karakalpakstan on 2 July, and President Mirziyoyev declaring a state of emergency in the region. The protests were quelled by the morning of 3 July. The state of emergency was lifted on 21 July.

=== Yemen ===
The Yemeni Civil War is an ongoing conflict that began in 2015 between two factions: the Abdrabbuh Mansur Hadi led Yemeni government and the Houthi armed movement, along with their supporters and allies. Both claim to constitute the official government of Yemen.

During the Red Sea crisis the Houthi movement within Yemen launched a barrage of missiles and armed drones at Israel. The Houthis staged multiple seizures of civilian-operated cargo ships sailing near the Yemeni coast, and claimed any Israel-linked shipping as a target, although multiple vessels with no apparent link to Israel have also been attacked. Houthis said they would not stop until Israel ceases its war on Hamas. Houthi militants also fired on various countries' merchant vessels in the Red Sea, and particularly in the Bab-el-Mandeb—a chokepoint of the global economy as it serves as the southern maritime gateway to the Suez Canal of Egypt. To avoid Houthi attacks, hundreds of commercial vessels rerouted to sail around South Africa. The Houthis' militant activities in the Red Sea have incurred a military response from a number of countries; the United States, which assembled Operation Prosperity Guardian to protect the Red Sea shipping route, has bombed the Houthi-controlled parts of Yemen and attacked Houthi vessels in the Red Sea.
