= Alireza Assar =

Musician, singer, Songwriter

- علیرضا عصار
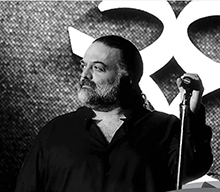
- Born: January 24, 1970 (age 56); Rey Avenue, Tehran, Imperial State of Iran
- Occupations: Songwriter, singer
- Years active: 1997–present
- Spouse: Nastaran Pakbaz
- Musical career
- Genres: Pop
- Instruments: Piano, guitar
- Labels: Avaye Honar, Irangaam Records, Soroush Multimedia Corporation, Hamavaz Ahang, Avaye Barg, Hozeh Honari Music Center
- Website: alirezaassar.net

Alireza Assar (Persian: علیرضا عصار; born January 24, 1970 in Tehran) is an Iranian musician and Persian pop singer and composer, and piano and guitar player.

== Biography ==
The oldest child of a four-member family in Tehran, He studied the piano under the supervision of Kavous Samandar, Javad Maaroufi and Mostafa Pourtorab. His first concert was in Aboureihan-e Birooni Hall in Shahid Beheshti University at age 16. Since then he had several concerts worldwide.

He began his career as a pop singer in March 1997 (Norouz 77) by performing "Eidaneh" on television. His first album, Kouch-e Asheghaneh, published in 1999, with the hit single "Ghodsiane Aseman" made him one of the most popular singers of the new generation of pop singers after the Islamic Revolution.

In 2006, Assar started a new genre of Persian pop in collaboration with renowned conductor, Shahrdad Rohani and the London Symphony Orchestra. Open Secret comprises seven pieces inspired by poems from Ahmad Shamlou, Mohammad Reza Shafiei-Kadkani, Afshin Yadollahi, Shahkar Bineshpajuh, and Afshin Moqaddam. The work was recorded in Abbey Road Studio.

After that album, Assar released two more albums, Mohtaseb and Bazi Avaz Shodeh.

In 2017, he performed at a celebration in Tehran honoring thirty years of collaboration between Iran and the World Food Programme.

In January 2016 Assar held a concert after six years of silence. This concert was a great comeback with selling more than 20 thousand tickets.

In December 19th 2017 he released a new album titled " Joz Eshgh Nemikhaham " . This album has been chosen as the best album of the year unanimously by all the musicians participated in "Muzice Ma " Festival.

And in 2017 he held another successful concert selling more than 20 thousand tickets.

In January 2020 news reports, Assar was listed as one of the Iranian celebrities who showed support for Ukraine International Airlines Flight 752 protests by canceling planned events.

At the end of 2021 he started cooperating with a talent show " Band Bazi" as the head of the judges. And meanwhile he is planning to produce his new album.

== Discography ==
=== Studio albums ===
- Kooch-e Asheghaneh (Loving Migration), 1999 Pezhvak Studio
- Hal-e Mane-e Bi To, 2001 Studio Echo
- Eshgh-e-Elahi (Agape), 2003 Soroush Multimedia Corporation
- Ey Asheghan, 2005 Irangaam
- Molay-e-Eshgh, 2007 Irangaam
- Nahan Makon (Open Secret), 2008 Irangaam
- Bazi ʿAvaz Shodeh (The Game Has Changed), 2011 Hozeh Honari Music Center
- Mohtaseb, 2011 Hozeh Honari Music Center
- Joz Eshgh Nemikhaham, 2017 Avaye Honar

=== Singles ===
- "Ey Yar Ghalat Kardi!", March 13, 2014
- "Derakht Istaade Mimirad", 2015
- "Man Ba Toam", 2016
