= Zahra Khatamirad =

- Born: December 17, 1981 (age 44); Aachen, Germany
- Education: University of Tehran
- Occupation: Television presenter
- Years active: 2004–2020 (Iran)
- Spouses: Kamran Majidi (m. 2001; div. 2009) Mohammad Bolkhari (m. 2010)
- Children: Mani Majidi; Nami Bolkhari

Zahra Khatamirad (Persian: زهرا خاتمی راد; born December 17, 1981, in Aachen, Germany) is an Iranian TV presenter and journalist .

== Biography ==
Zahra Khatamirad was born into an Iranian family in Aachen, Germany. She started her activity in Iran TV in 2004. She also holds a degree in Agricultural engineering from the University of Tehran and a bachelor's degree in German literature from Shahid Beheshti University. She also has two sons, Mani and Nami.

== TV activity ==
She is an official reporter and TV Host of the IRIB with over 15 years of experience in performance, journalism, design of television programs, narration, radio anchor and interior design of TV program decor. Also she has worked as a presenter in various Iranian television programs such as: Host Simaye Khanevadeh (2015–2016), Host Shahr Avard (2013), Host Khaneh Mehr (2020), Reporter, journalist and TV host at the national Iranian television broadcasting (2009–2017), special reporter of the live broadcast of Iran's presidential election (2013–2017), reporting and journalism in cinema and TV projects in Tehran, TV host and writer of women social program Dokhtaraneh (2006–2008).

=== Resignation ===
After 15 years of activity in Iran TV, she announced her resignation from Iran TV in 2019 due to the downing of Ukraine International Airlines Flight 752 and the events of November 2019 in Iran through her official Instagram page. The publication of this news became so hot that it attracted the attention of Persian language news networks such as VOA, BBC and received a lot of coverage.
