= Ukraine International Airlines Flight 752 protests =

2020 anti-government protests in Iran

- Part of the 2019–2020 Iranian protests
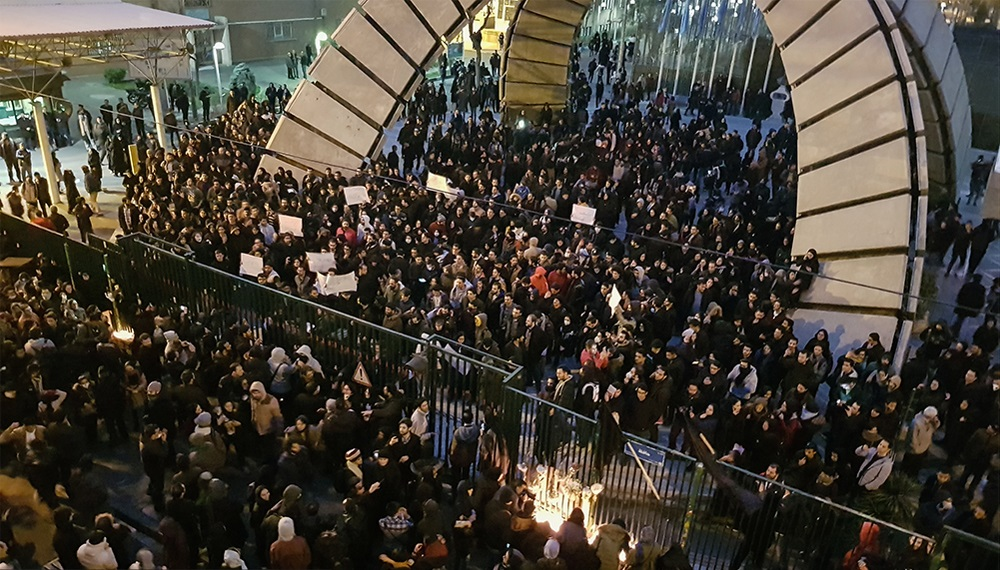
- Protesters at the Amirkabir University of Technology in the city of Tehran, 11 January 2020
- Date: 11–16 January 2020 (5 days)
- Location: Iran
- Caused by: Shootdown of Ukraine International Airlines Flight 752 by Iran's Islamic Revolutionary Guard Corps
- Goals: Fall of the Islamic Republic government
- Methods: Student rallies; political demonstrations and sit-ins; Internet activism; popular boycott of Islamic Republic of Iran Broadcasting; public displays of opposition to government's anti-Israeli and anti-American policies
- Result: Continued anti-government sentiment leading to the 2021–2022 Iranian protests and the 2022–2023 Mahsa Amini protests

Parties
Iranian opposition	Islamic Republic

Lead figures
No centralized leadership	Ali Khamenei; Hassan Rouhani; Hossein Salami; Amir Ali Hajizadeh

Casualties and losses
Unknown (censored)	Unknown

The Ukraine International Airlines Flight 752 protests were anti-government protests, forming part of the spillover clashes that took place in January 2020 resulting from the crackdown of the 2019 Iranian protests, which swept Iran in January 2020. The protests took place after it was revealed that Ukraine International Airlines Flight 752 was shot down by the Islamic Revolutionary Guard Corps of Iran, on 8 January 2020.

The Boeing 737-800 operating the route was shot down shortly after takeoff from Tehran Imam Khomeini International Airport; all 176 passengers and crew were killed. Initially, Iranian aviation authorities said that the plane crashed due to a technical error. However, investigation by western intelligence agencies later revealed the aircraft had been shot down by a Tor-M1 surface-to-air missile launched by Iran. Three days later, on 11 January, the Islamic Revolutionary Guard Corps said they had shot down the aircraft after mistaking it for a cruise missile. Soon after, vigils held in Iran intended to pay respect to the victims turned into protests, first at universities in Tehran and then across other Iranian cities. Protests began at the Amirkabir University of Technology, with Iranians chanting "death to the dictator" and calling for Supreme Leader Ali Khamenei to leave the country.

A government counter protest action painted Israeli and American flags on a planned protest march route, but protestors refused to walk on them. Pictures of Soleimani were torn down across Iran and protesters chanted, "Our enemy is right here; They lie to us [when they say] that it's America."

== Background ==
Since the mid-2010s Iran has experienced a wave of civil unrest, including protests, strikes and civil disobedience, forming part of a wider ongoing Iranian Democracy Movement, with protests against the current government of the Islamic Republic constant. The 2019 wave of the Iranian Democracy Movement resulted in major protests that presented the largest challenge to the Iranian government since the 1978–1979 Iranian Revolution. Originally against government corruption and economic deficiency, these protests quickly grew as fuel prices increased by 200% in Iran and the aim of the protests broadened into calling for the overthrow of the current Iranian government. The Iranian government cracked down on these protests violently, resulting in the Mahrshahr Massacre in November 2019 and an internet outage that quelled the protests, though anger and dissent amongst the Iranian public continued to remain extremely high. According to The New Yorker, many Iranians carry an extremely nationalistic pride of their nation’s pre-Islamic history as well as its history under the Pahlavi dynasty. The International Crisis Group claims the Islamic Republic’s shooting down of the Ukrainian flight carrying Iranians enraged the nation’s nationalist population resulting in the widespread protest. The frequency of protests in Iran has rapidly increased in recent years due to government's mismanagement and corruption. Meanwhile the Iranian government's responses to protest have become considerably more violent.

== Timeline ==
Students at the Amirkabir University of Technology in Tehran where students issued a manifesto in the name of "the children of Iran" against the Iranian regime. Videos of the protest revealed police beatings, gunshots, blood over the floors, and the use of tear gas. Due to censorship of reporting in Iran, the full extent to which the government repressed the protests are largely unknown. Days of protests were followed by heavy police presence across Iran resulting in little signs of opposition.

Discontent has been growing in Iran with citizens increasingly displaying frustrations years prior to the protest. When regime representatives chant "Death to America" and "Death to Israel" Iranians have chanted "Death to Russia" and "Death to China" as a sign that they don't agree with the Islamic Republic's political views. On 11 January 2020, after Iranian authorities had stated that Ukraine International Airlines Flight 752 had been shot down by Iranian military forces, killing all 176 passengers and flight personnel, two thousand people protested in Tehran, with chants including "Death to the dictator". Police used tear gas on the protestors. Officials reported that 82 Iranians among several other Iranians with dual citizenship were among the victims of the crash. Two hundred people protested in front of Amirkabir University of Technology. The protestors called for the Supreme Leader Ali Khamenei to resign, chanted "Death to the liars" and called "for the IRGC to leave the country". Protests also took place at the Sharif University of Technology and in Amol, Isfahan, Rasht, Sari, and Hamedan. Protesters chanted against the Revolutionary Guards, the Supreme Leader, and the entire political system of the Islamic Republic.

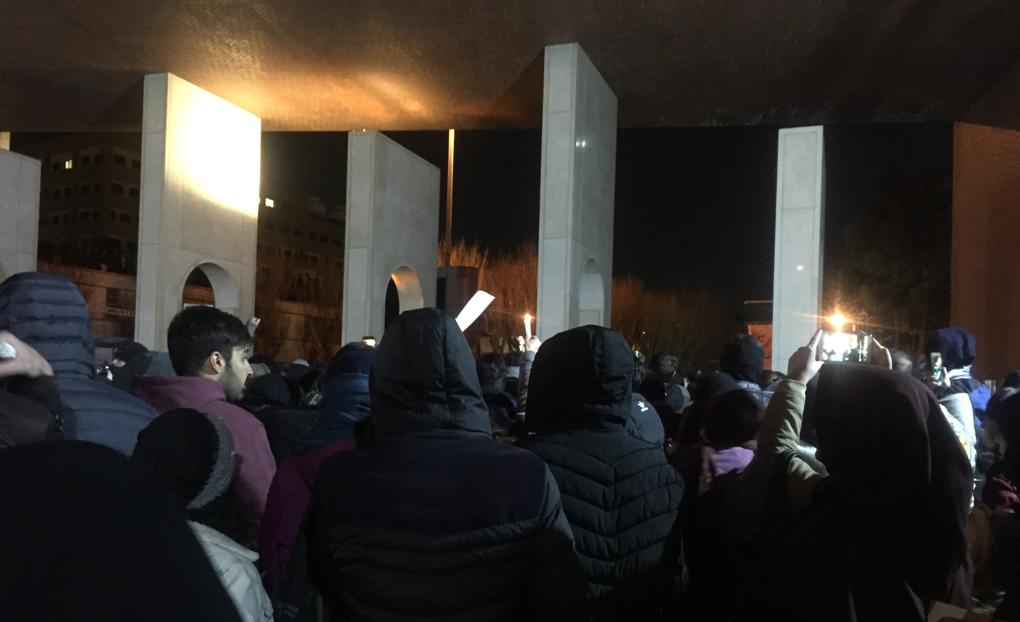
Protests at Sharif University, 12 January 2020

On 12 January, similar protests took place around Iran. In the morning, students gathered at the dormitories of the University of Tehran and chanted against the Supreme Leader. There were around 3,000 participants in the main demonstration in Tehran according to the Iranian Labour News Agency. In online social media videos posted in the evening of a location near Azadi Square in Tehran, there were sounds of gunshots, pools of blood on the ground, wounded people being carried and security personnel with rifles. Hossein Rahimi of the Tehran police stated the following day that police had "been given orders to show restraint" and didn't shoot during the protests. The Iranian daily Etemad wrote "Apologise and resign" in a banner headline. The Iranian president described the missile attack as an unforgivable error.

Protests continued in Tehran on 13 January, including 40 students at a Tehran university who chanted "They killed our elites and replaced them with clerics", in reference to the Iranian students who had died on flight UA752.

In the video surfacing on the internet, many Tehran university students openly refused to walk over the American and Israeli flags which was the symbol of the country’s foreign policy of anti-Americanism and anti-Zionism since the inception of the Islamic Republic. The flags had been painted on the road so that protesters would walk over them as they marched.

Several Iranian celebrities showed support of the protests by canceling planned events.

On 14 January, demonstrations took place in Iran for the fourth consecutive day. Students at various universities in Tehran, and other Iranian cities continued protesting against the regime and Ali Khamenei. At Amirkabir University of Technology, protesters and the Basij clashed violently. Students at the University of Tehran chanted "We will die to reclaim Iran" and "Death to the concept of a [Supreme Leader]".

On 15 January, students in Isfahan and other Iranian cities held their fifth day of protests, after the government of Ayatollah Khamenei admitted downing the Ukrainian passenger plane. Students held banners showing 1500+176 meaning 176 innocent passengers was added to the 1500 killed in November uprising.

On 16 January, protesters planned to head to the IRIB headquarters, however, due to a high persistence of the anti-riot police in the entire Valiasr Street which protesters planned to use as their main way to the headquarters, the demonstrations didn't take place. There was also a high persistence of police in several key points of the capital city of Tehran, to prevent any gatherings to form due to the funerals that took place for those dead in the UA752 flight, nevertheless, many mourners attended the funerals.

== Slogans and tactics ==
Protesters frequently chanted "The Supreme Leader is a murderer. His regime is obsolete", "Our enemy is right here; They lie to us [when they say] That it's America", "Death to the liars", "Clerics, get lost!", "Soleimani was a murderer, his Leader is also a murderer".

Banners and posters of the recently killed General Soleimani were torn down, burned, and stepped on by protesters.

== See also ==
- 2019–2020 Iranian protests
- Political repression in the Islamic Republic of Iran
- Late-2020 Iran protests
