= 2019–2020 Iranian protests =

Iranian series of protests

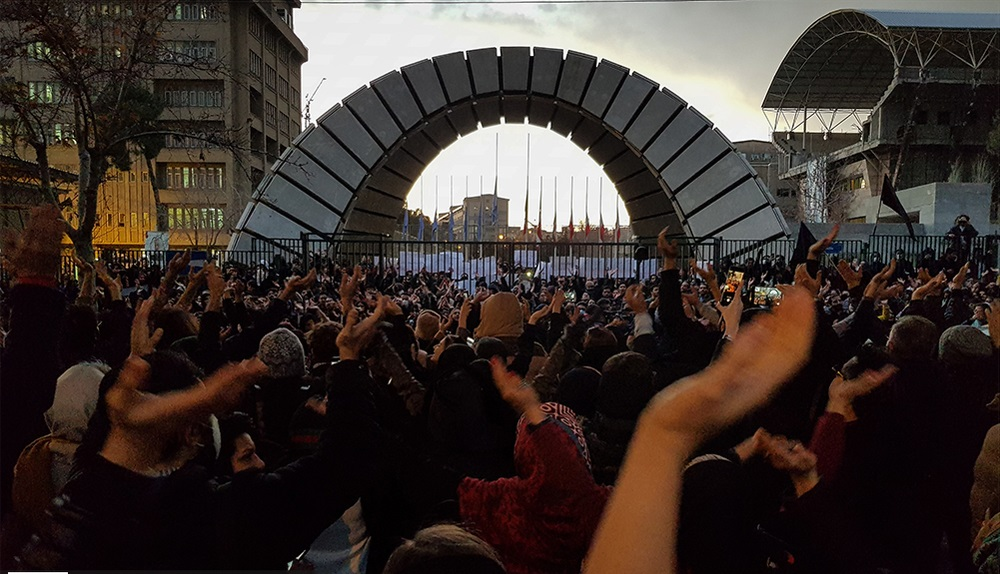
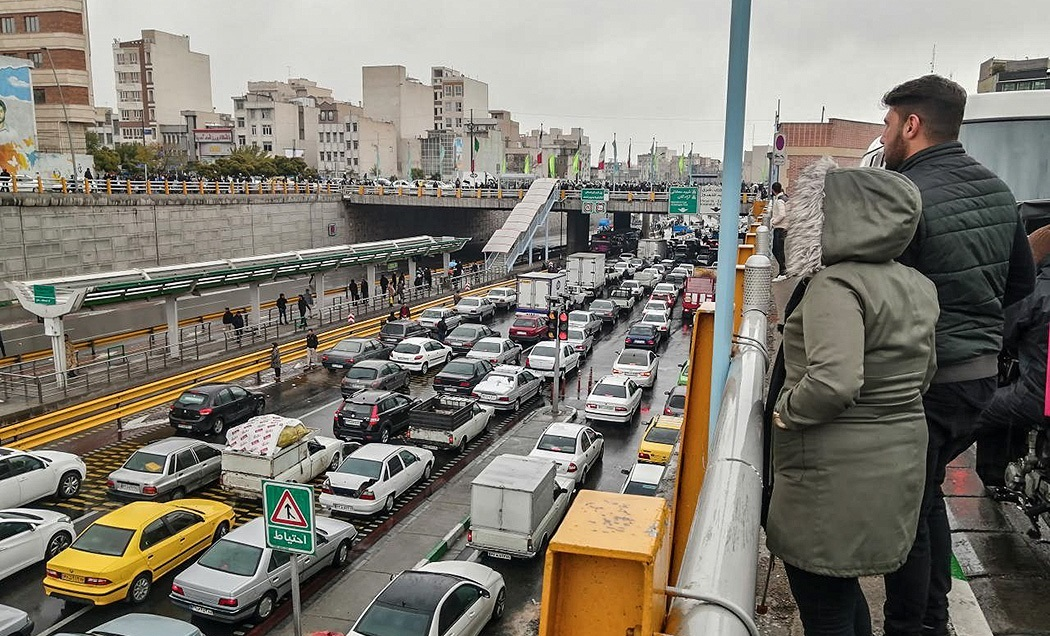
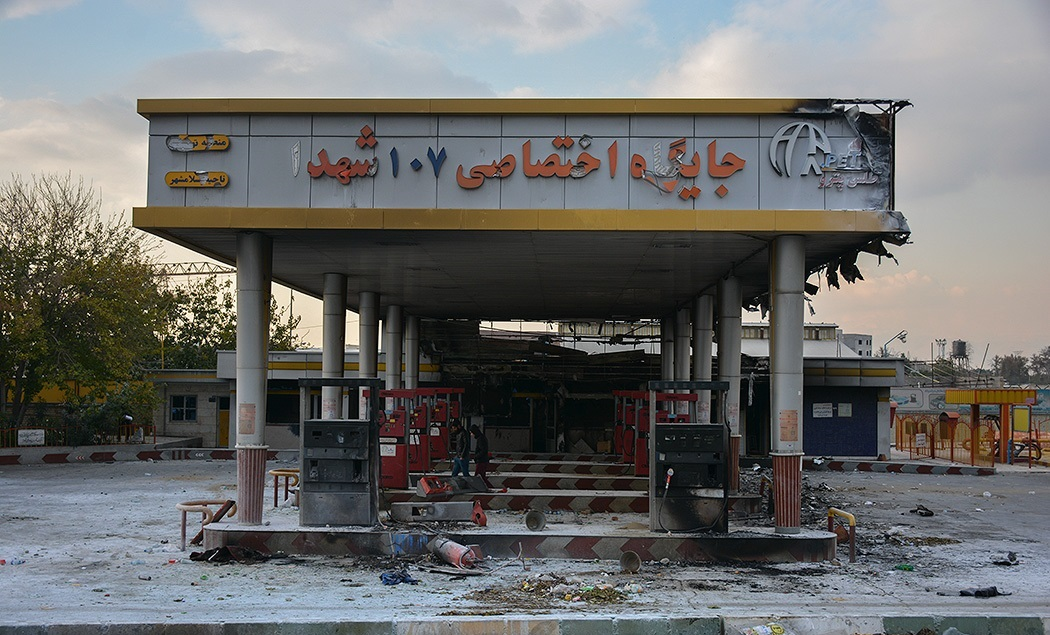
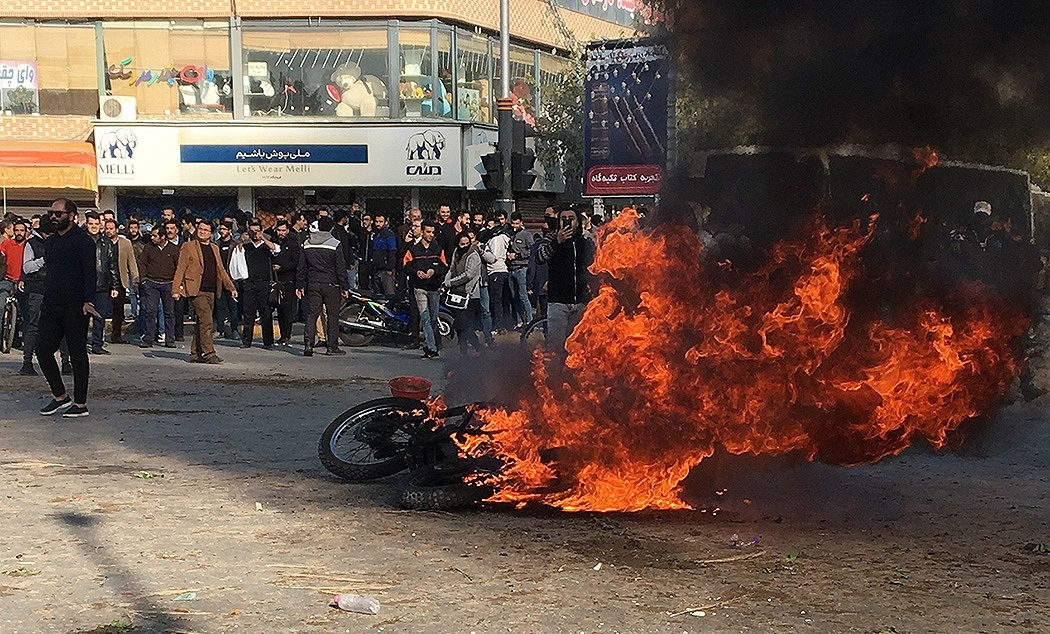
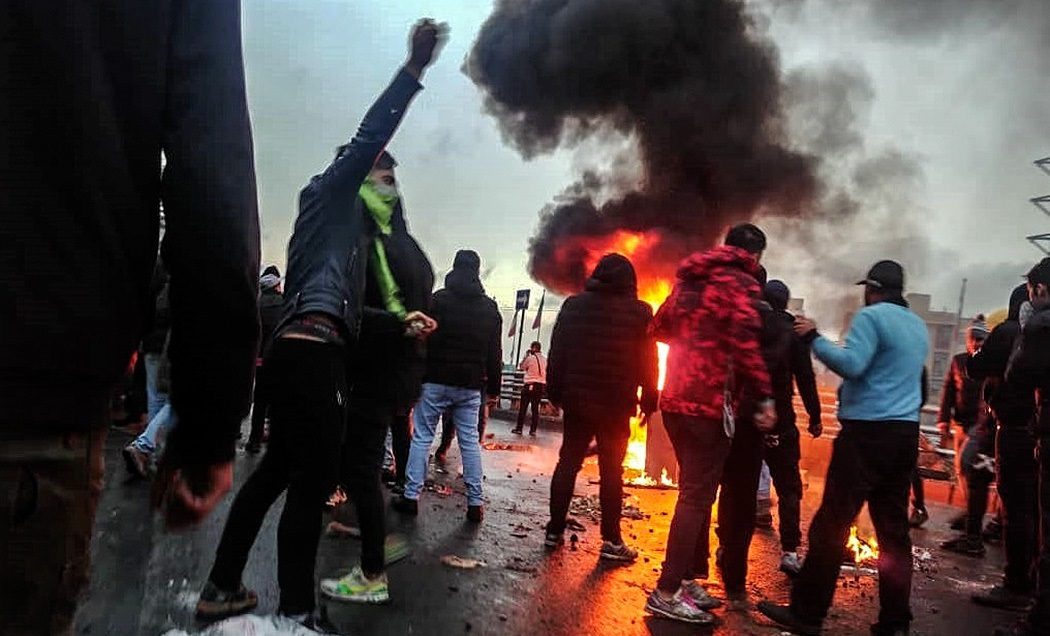
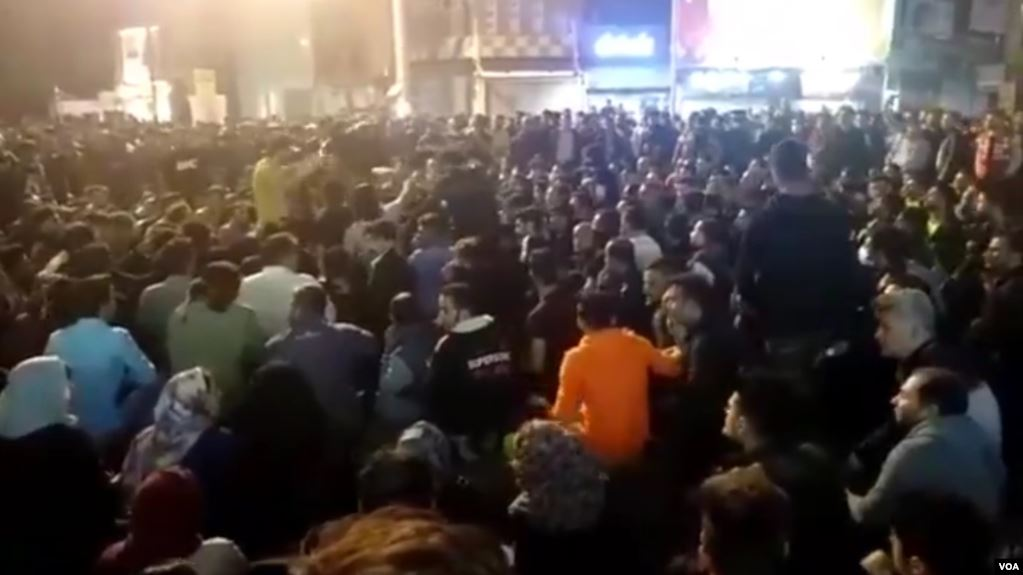
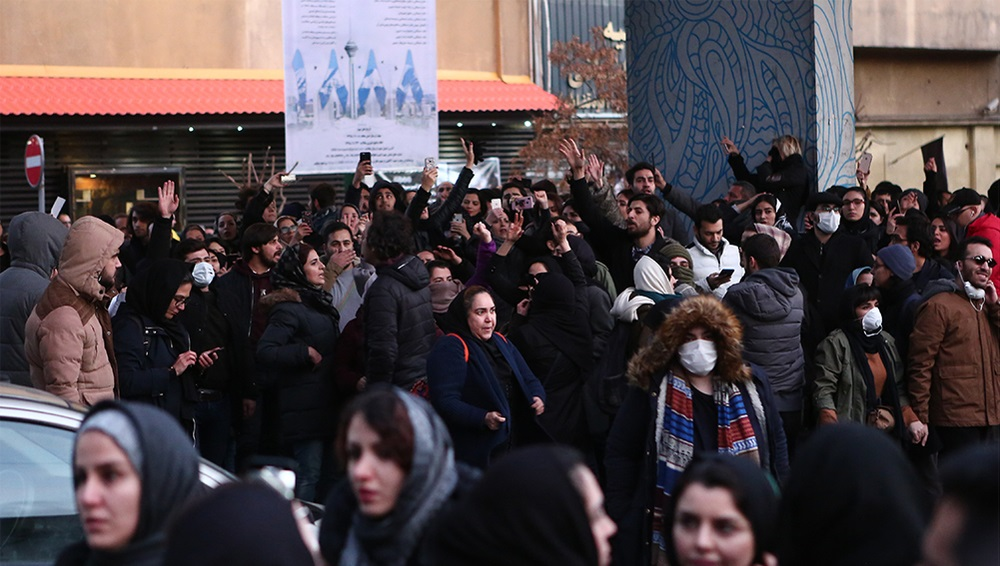
- Date: 15–19 November 2019 (4 days, main phase); Spillover clashes lasted until 16 July 2020 (8 months and 1 day)
- Location: Throughout Iran, in 29 provinces, 104 cities and 719 places.
- Caused by: Increase in fuel prices; Crackdowns of previous waves of the Iranian Democracy Movement, such as the 2017–2018 Iranian protests, resulting in failures to deliver the demands of the movement; Escalation of the 2018–2019 Iranian general strikes and protests occurring as part of the Iranian Democracy Movement; Government corruption; Poverty; Human rights abuses; Opposition to President Hassan Rouhani and Supreme Leader Ali Khamenei; Opposition to the Islamic Republic; Opposition to Iranian involvement in regional conflicts; Opposition to Anti-Americanism in Iran; The shootdown of Ukraine International Airlines Flight 752 (PS752) by the Iranian Government
- Goals: Social and economic stability; Prosecution of corrupt government officials; Removal of Ali Khamenei; Regime change and removal of the Islamic Republic of Iran
- Methods: Demonstrations, riots, sit-ins, civil resistance, strikes, online activisms, arson
- Result: Protests violently crushed by government troops; Internet blackout imposed by government; Continued growth and rise of the Iranian Democracy Movement, leading to further protests in the movement such as 2021–2022 Iranian protests and the Mahsa Amini protests

Parties
Protesters: Support by most anti-Islamic Republic organizations; (Pahlavi Iran) Monarchist; International support: Human Rights Watch (HRW); Amnesty International	Government of Iran Pro-government protesters

Lead figures
No centralized leadership	Ali Khamenei; Hassan Rouhani; Ebrahim Raisi; Ali Larijani; Hossein Salami; Rahmani Fazli; Hossein Ashtari; Azari Jahromi

Number
c. 200,000	100,000-150,000

Casualties and losses
225 killed (per Interior Ministry); 305+ protesters and bystanders killed (per Amnesty International and HRW); 1,500 in total killed (per Reuters); 1,000+ killed (per United States Department of State; 7,000+ arrested	731 banks and 140 government sites torched (per Abdolreza Rahmani Fazli)

The 2019–2020 Iranian protests, sometimes known by the protesters as Bloody November or (using the Iranian calendar) Bloody Aban (Persian: آبان خونین), were a series of nationwide civil protests in Iran that took place in 2019 and 2020. Initially caused by a 50–200% increase in fuel prices, they occurred as part of the wider Iranian Democracy Movement, leading to calls for the overthrow of the government in Iran and Supreme Leader Ali Khamenei. The protests commenced as peaceful gatherings on the evening of 15 November but spread to 21 cities within hours, as videos of the protest circulated online, eventually becoming the most violent and severe anti-government unrest since the Iranian Revolution in 1979.

To block the sharing of information regarding the protests and the deaths of hundreds of protesters on social media platforms, the government shut down the Internet nationwide, resulting in a near-total internet blackout of around six days. In an effort to crush the protests, the Iranian government (according to Amnesty International) shot protesters dead from rooftops, helicopters, and at close range with machine gun fire. In an effort to mask the scale and casualty count of the protests, it hauled away large numbers of bodies of the dead protesters, and threatened families of slain protesters not to speak to the media or hold funerals.

As many as 2,000 Iranian protesters were killed. The government crackdown and protests resulted in the destruction of 731 government banks including Iran's central bank, nine Islamic religious centres, protesters tearing down anti-American billboards, and posters and statues of Supreme Leader Ali Khamenei as well as former leader Ruhollah Khomeini. Fifty government military bases were also attacked by protesters. The Iranian regime also employed a week long nationwide internet shutdown becoming the longest total Internet shutdown in a large country. It was also the first blackout that effectively isolated a whole nation.

The uprising, as well as the wider Iranian Democracy Movement in general, differed from earlier protests in 2009 in not being limited to students and large cities, and in the speed, severity and higher death toll of the government crackdown, which crushed the uprising in three days, although protests flared up periodically in the months after.

== Background ==
The protests, which have occurred at various stages and times since the mid-2010s, increasing in both support and number each time, have found popular support amongst many Iranians. They have the intention of removing the Iranian government and addressing both economic and social issues within Iran, and are often fueled by low wages, unemployment, inflation, government corruption, an ongoing water crisis, disillusion amongst Iranian youth and by their Burnt Generation parents with the government's Islamist, anti-Western outlook, the isolation of Iran internationally, Iranian nationalist fervor and the government's handling of the COVID-19 pandemic.

The protests have been credited with being the largest challenge to the Islamic regime since the Iranian Revolution in 1978–1979, being characterised by a wider geographical spread, more diverse class and societal composition, a much more explicit defiance in its challenge of state authority, and a reduced aversion to enduring violence by dissenters, in a manner that previous Iranian protests such as those in 1999 and 2009 did not display.

This period of time coincided with a marked escalation in the Iran-Israel proxy conflict, and a "maximum pressure" campaign of sanctions imposed on the regime by the United States as punishment for its nuclear programs in violation of the JCPOA, and for its financing of terrorist proxies such as Hezbollah, Hamas, and the Houthis.

Iran has experienced numerous nationwide protests and civil unrest since 2016, including the 2016 Cyrus the Great Revolt, 2017–2018 Iranian protests, 2018–2019 Iranian general strikes and protests, Ukraine International Airlines Flight 752 protests (in January 2020).

Sanctions by the United States and the European Union, coupled with economic mismanagement, were factors involved in a severe economic crisis in Iran in the 2010s.

Multiple protests and strikes took place in Iran in December 2017, throughout 2018 and in the first half of 2019. Protest causes ranged from rising prices to teachers' and railway workers' rights.

Prior to the November 2019 cycle of unrest, the president of Iran Hassan Rouhani said, "Iran is experiencing one of its hardest years since the 1979 Islamic revolution". According to an estimate by Djavad Salehi-Isfahani cited in the Atlantic Council, inflation sent nearly 1.6 million Iranians into poverty in just a single year prior to the November 2019 protest, with a similar figure given by the Imam Khomeini Relief Foundation's office for employment and social welfare.

One of the grievances of the protesters was thought to be the privileges of the Islamic Republic's elite. During this time of economic hardship, a decree issued by the Supreme Leader Ali Khamenei exempted some trustees from paying taxes. They included Khatam al-Anbiya Construction Headquarters and many other smaller entities belonging to Islamic Revolutionary Guard Corps (IRGC). In September 2019, just two months before the uprising, a former member of Iran's Parliament, Behzad Nabavi, told an interviewer that the Razavi Economic Foundation (which is presided over by Khamenei), together with the Revolutionary Guards (IRGC) and the Ministry of Intelligence (MOIS), controls about 60% of the Iranian economy. None of these entities pay any taxes and no government organization is allowed to go through their books.

In late 2019, anti-government protests took place in Iranian allies Lebanon and Iraq.

The immediate cause of the protest was the increase in price of fuel, which was announced by the government at midnight on 15 November 2019. Prior to the price increase, drivers could buy up to 250 litres (66 US gal) each month for 10,000 Iranian rial per litre ($0.90 per US gallon). With the new price structure prices started at 15,000 rial per litre ($1.35 per US gallon) for the first 60 litres (16 US gal), and rose to 30,000 per litre ($2.70 per US gallon) after that, a price increase of 50% to 200%. An Iranian state-television programme described these measures as a way to help fund the subsidies of around 60 million Iranians. Besides toppling the regime, the protest movement is aimed at poverty, issues and corruption in the economy, especially higher wages and pensions.

== Timeline ==
=== 2019 ===
==== November 2019 ====
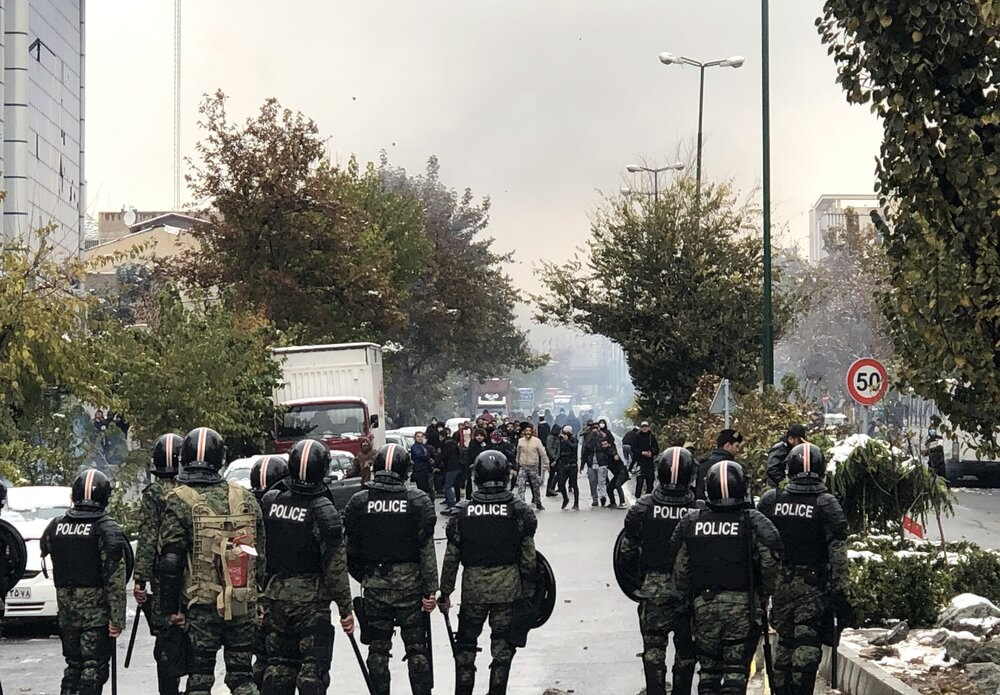
Riot police against protesters in Tehranpars

After the government announced the price increase in the early hours of 15 November, Iranians in various cities (37 cities according to reports by citizen journalists and social media) took to the streets to protest.

One protester was reportedly killed in Sirjan after security forces opened fire, while the governor said that the death had occurred under unclear circumstances. Other demonstrators in the city set fire to a gas station, and chanted "Rouhani, leave the country alone". Protesters in Ahvaz demanded that people boycott fuel and stop their cars in the middle of the road as a sign of protest.

In Mashhad, Iran's second-largest city, demonstrators blocked traffic in the streets and highways, turning them into parking lots. Protesters gathered late into the night in Qods, a suburb of Tehran, and destroyed a police vehicle. Protests were peaceful at first, as was the state response.

Protests continued to expand for a second day on 16 November. Demonstrators gathered in over 50 cities and many major cities such as Tehran, Tabriz, Isfahan, and Shiraz to protest the sudden price hike. Security forces shot at protesters with live bullets in an effort to disperse them, killing at least ten protesters in Isfahan, Behbahan, Kermanshah, Karaj, and Shiraz.

Several banks in Eslamshahr, Behbahan, and Tehran, and one religious school in Isfahan were burned down by protesters. In Shahriar demonstrators burned down a monument depicting the ring of the Ruhollah Khomeini, the founder of the Islamic Republic.

On 16 November, internet access across the country was reported to be in a near-total shutdown, with online activity estimated to be 7% of ordinary levels.

State news agencies reported that over 1,000 people had been arrested by the 16th, and that the protests had spread to over 100 cities in Iran.

Shop owners in Tehran and Isfahan closed the bazaars and went on strike in protest. While in Tabriz, students from the University of Tabriz left their classes and demonstrated at the university.

Students at the University of Tehran gathered for a second day to protest on 16 November, the current situation in the country and chanted "Death to the dictator", and "Not Gaza, not Lebanon, my life only for Iran". Protests continued in the Sadeghiyeh neighbourhood of Tehran, and the bazaar was packed with security forces attempting to prevent bazaar merchants from going on strike. Citizens of Tehran reported that despite the internet shutdown, the protests gathered in intensity on Tuesday.

Heavy clashes were also reported in Shiraz, where the security forces fired directly at people. Authorities reported that nine Islamic seminaries and Friday prayer offices were burned by protesters across the country. Protests continued for a fifth consecutive day on 19 November despite a heavy security presence the country. Gatherings were reported in Tehran, Karaj, Shiraz and Isfahan. The city of Shush in Khuzestan province, was effectively closed down as Haft Tappeh workers protested the current conditions.

The Revolutionary Guards reportedly took the bodies of the dead protesters and the injured in hospitals, to hide to cover up the true death toll and downplay the protests. In some cases, government officials sold the bodies of the protesters. The protests reached 70% of provinces according to The Guardian.

On 21 November, Iran partially restored access to the internet. Residents of Tehran told The New York Times that the government had finished securing the northern area, but not the middle-class and working-class areas of the city. A 26 November Guardian editorial characterized the protests as "crushed".

==== December 2019 ====
On 7 December, coinciding with Students Day in Iran, students in Tehran and various other cities conducted demonstrations in support of the protests. In the early hours of 17 December, students at Shahid Beheshti University in Tehran gathered outside the dormitories and protested the killing of protesters.

On 25 December, the day before the 40th day mourning procession of the protesters killed in the November protests, security forces arrested several members of Pouya Bakhtiari's family.

On 26 December, security forces attacked different cemeteries around Iran to prevent the families, of those killed in November uprising, from holding ceremonies in honour of the 40th day of the death of their loved ones. Some of the mourners were arrested and taken away. One month after Iranian rulers fears any anti-government gathering.

=== January 2020 protests and the beginning of renewed protests and unrest ===
The January 2020 protests were organised by bus drivers and taxi drivers in Tehran. Anti-regime protests were rising, with this chant, "Death to corrupt officials", heard the most. Seasonal workers in Marivan participated in a strike movement as well, despite attacks by the security forces and intimidation meant to quell public protests that had begun on 24 January triggered by economic grievances. Kangan and Sanandaj experienced protests by oil workers and other sectors, with more that five blockades in protest for having not received any wages. Kaki saw protest rallies over water and fuel shortage crises sparking anger by their citizens for days. Employees in Mahshahr's petrochemical factory protested non-payment of wages and inadequate responses to their demands. Eslamabad Gharb saw Railway workers protesting against not being paid for five months and the halting of their main construction project by the Security Forces. Hundreds of customers were regularly protesting in regular marches against the stock market and central bank crash in Tehran. Buildings in Isfahan were surrounded by hundreds of farmers, repeatedly rallying over poor conditions. Recent protests also took place in Khuzestan and Ahvaz and met with violent reactions from security forces. Locals staged rallies in Ahvaz and Gorgan, protesting imprisonments of protesters and demanding the president Hassan Rouhani to step down. In Khuzestan, bus drivers went on strike in protest to their low wages and the high price of spare parts for their buses.

==== January 2020 ====
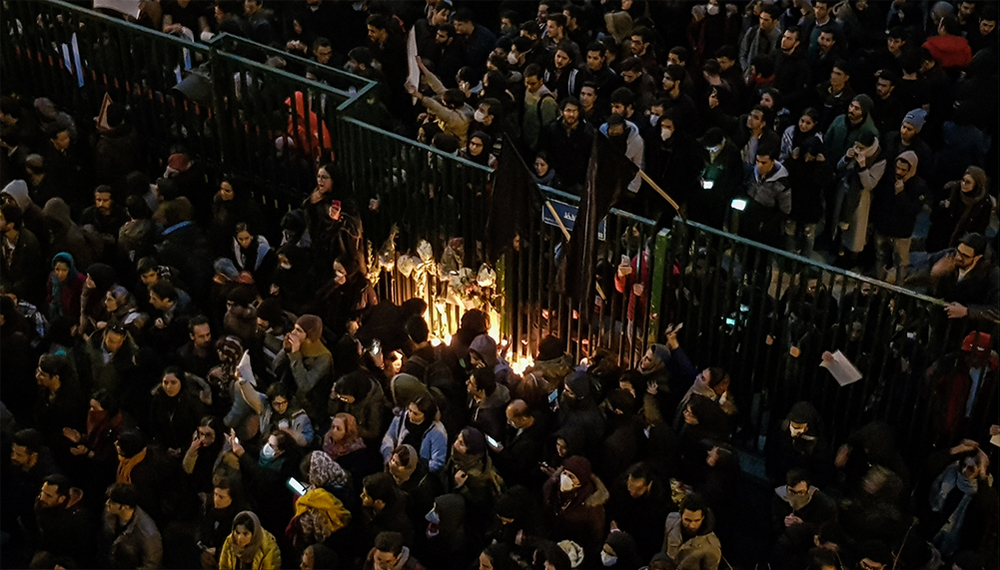
Protests at Tehran's Hafez Street, 11 January 2020

On 11 January, after Iranian authorities had stated that Ukraine International Airlines Flight 752 had been shot down by Iranian military forces, killing all 176 passengers and flight personnel, three thousand people protested in Tehran, with chants including "Death to the dictator". Police used tear gas on the protestors. Officials reported that 82 Iranians among several other Iranians with dual citizenship were among the victims of the crash. Hundreds of people protested in front of Amirkabir University of Technology. The protestors called for the Supreme Leader Ali Khamenei to resign, chanted "Death to the liars" and called "for the IRGC to leave the country". Protests also took place at the Sharif University of Technology and in Isfahan, Rasht, Sari, and Hamedan. Protesters chanted against the Revolutionary Guards, the Supreme Leader, and the entire political system of the Islamic Republic.

On 12 January, similar protests took place around Iran. In the morning, students gathered at the dormitories of the University of Tehran and chanted against the Supreme Leader. There were around 3,000 participants in the main demonstration in Tehran according to the Iranian Labour News Agency. In online social media videos posted in the evening of a location near Azadi Square in Tehran, there were sounds of gunshots, pools of blood on the ground, wounded people being carried and security personnel with rifles. Hossein Rahimi of the Tehran police stated the following day that police had "been given orders to show restraint" and did not shoot during the protests. The Iranian daily Etemad wrote "Apologise and resign" in a banner headline. The Iranian president described the missile attack as an unforgivable error.

Protests continued in Tehran on 13 January, including 40 students at a Tehran university who chanted "They killed our elites and replaced them with clerics", in reference to the Iranian students who had died on flight AUI752.

In the video surfacing on the internet, many Tehran university students openly refused to walk over the American and Israeli flags which was the symbol of the country's foreign policy of anti-Americanism and anti-Zionism since the inception of the Islamic Republic. The flags had been painted so that protesters would walk over them as they marched.

On 14 January, students at various universities in Tehran, and other Iranian cities continued protesting against the regime and Ali Khamenei. At Amir Kabir University, protesters and the Basij clashed violently. Students at the University of Tehran chanted "We will die to reclaim Iran" and "Death to the concept of a [Supreme Leader]".

On 15 January, students in Isfahan and other Iranian cities held their 5th day of protests, after the government of Ayatollah Khamenei admitted downing the Ukrainian passenger plane. Students held banners showing 1500+176 meaning 176 innocent passengers was added to the 1500 killed in November uprising.

On 16 January, protesters planned to head down Valiasr Street to the IRIB headquarters in the capital city of Tehran, but were prevented by the heavy presence of in that street. Anti-riot police also took position in several other key points to prevent funeral gatherings for those killed in the missile attack on AUI752 flight. Nevertheless, many mourners attended the funerals.

==== February 2020 ====
On the 40th day anniversary of the Ukraine International Airlines Flight 752 victims memorial at Amir Kabir University on 16 February, students chanted against the ruling system and called for the boycott of the 2020 parliamentary election.

On 25 February, a human rights center in Iran announced that a court in Iran sentenced five persons arrested during November uprising to different prison terms from 18 months to eleven years. The five detainees, who aged between 29 and 51 years, also received different number of lashes. The state court charged them with " collusion against national and international security" and "propaganda against the system".

The organization Human Rights Watch has called on the Geneva United Nations Human Rights Council to adopt "Urgent action" in regard to the "brutal crackdown" of the November protests in Iran. Michael Page, the organization's deputy director for the Middle East says, "Iranian authorities are now confronting popular protests with an astonishing level of violence".

=== March 2020 ===
In March 2020, amid the COVID-19 outbreak, Iran's prisons became overcrowded and rioting broke out in prisons in Tehran, Khorramshahr and Ahvaz, where 17 were wounded during protests by prisoners in the city against the fears of the spread of COVID-19 in Iranian prisons. Security forces reportedly fired gunshots in Khorramshahr and altogether, 36 were feared dead during the prison riots nationwide.

=== April 2020 ===
From 9–22 April, hunger strikes, demonstrations, protest marches, public unrest and protests erupted in Iran's prisons until July as well, protesting the outbreak of COVID-19 in prison. In response, the government released 85,000 prisoners. The rioting in Fars, Khorramshahr and Ahvaz on 30–31 March was called for the release of prisoners and better conditions in prisons to combat the virus; it was the deadliest prison unrest in years.

=== Mid 2020 (May–August) ===
A wave of massive worker protests broke out across Iran when municipal workers and nurses participated in large gatherings against the COVID-19 impact on Iran. For weeks, gatherings, meetings, speeches, strikes and demonstrations occurred nationwide, with at least two cities experiencing major protests. In Khuzestan, medical staff organised large protest rallies in front of their offices, demanding wages and better conditions for hospitality workers. Factory workers, coal miners, machine manufacturers and worker sectors have been among those protesting due to unpaid wages, shortages and poor economy. Protesters have rallied since then.

Factory and city employees, coal miners, as well as health-care workers are among those who have been protesting in Iran in July. Three weeks of worker protests have broken out across Iran as protests against working conditions, a worsening economy and issues with employment. Demonstrations and strikes were calling for payments and complaints of not receiving their wages for months, lack of jobs and employment, unemployment, poor policies and wage increases as well in cities like Tabriz, Dezful, Khoramabad, Khorramshahr (Between 13 and 26 August, workers staged strikes), Behbahan, Ghazvin, Shiraz (where sugarcane workers launched strikes) and Ahvaz by teachers, workers, miners, nurses and doctors protesting shortages and grappling with the COVID-19 outbreak, municipality workers and jobless workers who had retired. Mashhad, Rasht, Urmia, Ahvaz, Shush, Yazd, and Khomein experienced women's protests by nurses, teachers, doctors, municipality workers and taxi drivers protesting the conditions and no rights they face.

Ebrahim Arabzadeh, a contract worker at Mahshahr petrochemical complex, died from heat exhaustion at work on 28 July. This sparked an unprecedented wave of strike action across Iran, with 10,000 workers going on strike, battling the 50-degrees heat in some areas to protest in the oil and gas fields in southern Iran like Abadan and Mahshahr. Protesters were builders, electricians, welders, pipefitters and other tradesmen who are leading mass protests and political strike action across the country to protest in their tens of thousands against gang-money robbery in banks and employee conditions in Arak, where hundreds blocked and abandoned their work to join the protests and it even spread to Isfahan, where hundreds called for full-time work and permanent jobs. Workers have been on strike for days in late-July and early August, and unemployment protests have also broken out across industries and factory workers have joined the strike action, ending after a couple of weeks of strikes, with no demands met.

It is said that 237 protest movements were formed in 85 cities in Iran in July 2020. On 16 July 2020, amid a heavy security presence, protesters took to the streets of Behbehan and chanted "We don't want a clerical regime" and "Not Gaza, not Lebanon, my life only for Iran". The security forces fired tear gas to disperse the protesters, as witnessed told Reuters. A heavy security presence was also reported in various other Iranian cities. The protests come under the slogan "#StopExecutionsInIran" (Persian: اعدام نکنید). On the eve of 16 July 2020, a protest gathering was formed in the city of Behbahan in Khuzestan province. According to social media account, the execution verdicts for the protesters of 2019–2020 Iranian protests and economical hardships brought by government's lack of proper management were the key points of this protest. According to NetBlocks, Khuzestan's bandwidth was strictly limited in the night of 15 July 2020. According to Deutsche Welle, the unrest also spread to Shiraz, Isfahan, Rasht, Mashhad, Tabriz and Urmia. The protest gatherings, protesters was rallying against hardships for days before the initial uprising, with many injured during rallies as well.

The Haft Tappeh Sugar Cane Mill Labor Syndicate was the epicentre and scene of protest rallies for two months in 2020, from May to July. Workers staged daily street protests for not receiving their wages for consecutive months and the policy of privatisation. Strikers were attacked during the protests in Ahvaz, yet this wave of employee protests was the most peaceful. Thousands participated in clapping strikes, general strikes, walk-outs, chanting and rallying. Strikers were fired in response to the large strikes for months against low wages and no pay-checks. Maryam Rajavi supported the protest action, mentioning on Twitter, "The clerical regime has abandoned our people in the clutches of disease, unemployment and poverty. They do not pay workers and nurses' salaries. The only solution is replacing the mullahs' oppressive rule in #Iran with people's sovereignty and the rule of democracy". Thousands of these workers of Haft Tappeh demonstrated in the streets of Shush, calling on their colleagues to show solidarity with their protest march and the slogan "Worker of Haft Tappeh, Unity, Unity." The workers also chanted, "Death to Rouhani, reduce embezzlement, our problem will be solved," and the workers occupied the streets of Shush while shouting and clapping loudly.

Protesters rallied in Bandar Abbas, Gilan, Bushehr and other provinces for strike actions for weeks in June–July against low wages and unpaid salaries. Nurses, physicians, medical students, medical staff, doctors and appointees held rallies across Iran, mainly Mashhad and Rasht. Labour protests and union rallies were organised by professionals in Mashhad, protesting risking their lives on the frontlines and not getting their main attention. Protesters were attacked almost daily by Riot police with batons. Maryam Rajavi commented in support of the demonstrating nurses.

=== September 2020 ===
The protest movement first began on 21 September, when rallies were organized by Trade unions against low wages, but the demand became soon into a broader movement, with teachers, farmers, students, drivers, mechanics, shopkeepers, public sector workers, and more social sectors joining the movement, demanding an end to corruption, unemployment, no insurances of workers, licenses being taken away, landlord and worker's bosses taking away money form workers, shops looted and shopkeepers unemployed during the 2019–20 Iranian protests, harsh working and living conditions, blackouts, crackdowns, outages, poverty, inflation, closures of factories, government's handling of the COVID-19 pandemic, media agencies shutdowns and many more deep issues. Massive labour protests also hit areas nationwide like: Rasht, Zanjan, Yazd, Abadan, Behbahan, Shiraz, Tabriz, Isfahan, Ahvaz, Khorramshahr, Kerman, Mashhad, Ardebil and Qom.

Peaceful protests and nonviolent boycotts have also been taking place as well. Workers, teachers and students have also led massive labour protests and general strikes, occupations, wildcat strikes, Rent strikes at shops and closed companies and sit-ins. On 29 September, police, who had hitherto been passive, moved in to disperse protesters but failed to quell the protests. On 24 January, after three days of protests in Iranshahr, Security forces fired birdshot and stun grenades to quell youth protests and insurrectional demonstrations and rebellious protests in the city.

On 21–29 September, workers in sugar factories in Mahabad took to the streets in protest against non-payments, dismissal of several of their colleagues and worker conditions. The protest in Isfahan by locals, protesting heavy machinery in their farms, was quelled. Hundreds of workers in Ahvaz demanded authorities to provide job and livelihood security. In Babol, nurses and medical staff protested against delayed paychecks. In Tehran, retired workers led rallies asking for their wages claims to be addressed. In factories and companies in Yazd, workers gathered in large numbers, protesting the officials' refusal to pay their overdue wages. In Savadkuh, industrial workers and miners in factories participated in protests calling for adequate pay based on their job conditions. In Shush, farmers protested a sugar beet contract with Kermanshah, Islamabad companies. In Shiraz, nurses and medical staff protested their delayed paychecks for days. Truck drivers in the city of Fardis protested low fares and high vehicle maintenance costs in a large strike.

=== October–November 2020 ===
Between 30 September and 7 October, there were protests in Zanjan, Tabriz, Khuzestan and Urmia, demonstrating against the prices of bread and poor conditions. Medical staff went on strike and kindergarten teachers rallied against the government. Teachers and female workers protested in Tehran, Dezful and Hamedan for unconditional employment and better working statuses. Workers rallied in Yazd and Fars protesting the conditions there.

Workers at natural-gas and petrochemical factories in Hamideh and Mahshahr went on strike for weeks in protest against arrests of workers, employee discrimination and delayed pay checks.

In October 2020, protesters rallied in support of Azerbaijan in the conflict with Armenia, the 2020 Nagorno-Karabakh War. The military crackdown became harsh as protests became larger and violent. Ethnic Azeris constitute a large minority of the Iranian population. The military forces used tear gas and reportedly clashed with protesters in Tabriz, Ardebil, Tehran and Urmia, calling for the closure of the border with Armenia. 38 were detained during demonstrations.

Worker protests and rallies from 1–21 October were launched after payments were delayed and unpaid wages triggered protests. In Fars, workers protested in large numbers, protesting delayed pay-checks and poor livelihoods. Municipality workers in Hamideh, Ahvaz were arrested after holding gatherings against delayed pay-checks. After Mohammad Reza Shajarian's death, massive and large anti-regime protests broke out in Tehran, as thousands called for press freedom and the government of Hassan Rouhani to step down. The protest movement led to many arrests and interventions as well. In Bojnurd, municipal workers gathered with their families to protest lack of job security. In Ahvaz, fired municipality workers demanded to be returned to work. Arvand Kenar, Ahvaz saw mass protests by municipal workers, private sector workers, miners in Kerman and locals there protested against the drying up of their main wells, pre-school teachers held rallies in Ahvaz demanding a change in their employment status and healthcare workers in protest against delayed wages. In Tabriz, workers rallied in front of their factory, protesting their colleagues dismissals and delayed pay-checks. In Meshginshahr, protesters took to the streets in factories to protest delayed pay-checks.

Mass protests by 25000 workers and railway workers, miners, infrastructure sectors and teachers occurred all across Iran in October–November, the biggest workers protests since the 1953 strikes. Oil-workers and gas-sector strikes were organised in protest against unpaid wages for months. Spontaneous and sporadic protests simultaneously broke out across the country. Ongoing strikes occurred by workers in Tabriz, Khorasan, Markazi, Khuzestan and more in protest by workers, municipalities, teachers, railway employees and others.

== Internet shutdown ==
On the eve of the protests, Iranian authorities started disrupting internet connections and social media. The Internet was effectively blocked following Iran's Supreme National Security Council decision to shut it down for 24 hours.

Because of internet censorship in Iran, the Iranian government and the Islamic Revolutionary Guards Sepah have always opposed joining Iranian to popular social networks such as Facebook, Twitter and so on. Therefore, popular social networks are blocked by those in Iran and because of Iranian protests, internet censorship in Iran has increased. But now they have decided to Internet blackout in Iran.

NetBlocks reports that users first reported outages in Mashhad on 15 November. The disruptions increased in extent and severity with impact also visible on overall connectivity charts. Iran's largest mobile network operators, including MCI, Rightel and IranCell, were deactivated on the evening of 16 November 2019. By 20 November, national connectivity was at 5% of ordinary levels, making it difficult to monitor human rights violations and cover incidents on the ground.

The government has also jammed satellite TV connections and sent anonymous messages to people near protest sites reading: "We know you are here."

On 21 November 2019, a small return of connectivity was tracked by NetBlocks, along with reports that some users had returned online; national connectivity was up to 8%.

== Slogans and tactics ==
Chants, banners and posters of demonstrators targeted the government and its leaders, and such pillars of the Islamic Republic ideology as pan-Islamic unity, anti-Zionist solidarity with Palestine and Hezbollah of Lebanon, reverence and awe for the Supreme Leader, and hatred for the Pahlavi dynasty. Many protest chants and slogans were directed at expressing discontent with the Iranian government's spending on conflicts in Gaza, Iraq, Syria, Lebanon, and Yemen. Other chants praised the late Shah of Iran calling for his return.

=== Slogans ===
In November 2019, people chanted, "Clerics must get lost", "No to Gaza, no to Lebanon. We sacrifice our lives for Iran," "Death to the dictator", "Death to the Islamic Republic", "Our military brothers, why do you kill your brother?", "Not Gaza, not Lebanon, my life only for Iran", "Oil money has been lost, it has all been spent on Palestine", "They have brought up Islam, but trampled the people", "The supreme leader lives like a God. We, the people live like beggars." "We have no money or fuel, to hell with Palestine."

Chants became even more radical in the January protests, with demonstrators calling for a revolution and chanting, "This is your last month, [Khamenei] it is time to go", "Clerics must get lost", "No reforms, no referendum, just strikes and revolution", "Sepah commits murders, and the Supreme Leader supports it", "You killed our elites, and replaced them with clerics", and "Death to Khamenei".

=== Tactics and methods ===
Allegedly, the leaders of the movement orchestrated all activities, planning and disseminating information regarding dates and locations via their social media platforms. Protesters began by organizing rallies in protest of Iran's government resulting in police gunfire. As protests were met with government crackdowns, protesters began to block streets and highways, often parking their vehicles in the road. The protests intensified with Iranians burning pictures and banners of the supreme leader Ali Khamenei and burning government banks.

According to the government, four of the security forces killed were shot even though civilians are "largely forbidden to have guns".

=== Support for former monarchy ===
One common protest slogan was "Oh Shah of Iran return to Iran." Many protest chants praised the former Pahlavi dynasty and its two leaders. Monarchist groups supporting the former Pahlavi monarchy were targeted and arrested by authorities across multiple cities. It was reported that some members in a monarchist organization had gone as far as infiltrating the government. During the protest the Iranian Revolutionary Guards had openly admitted the Pahlavi dynasty was popular among much of Iran's population.

== Detainees ==
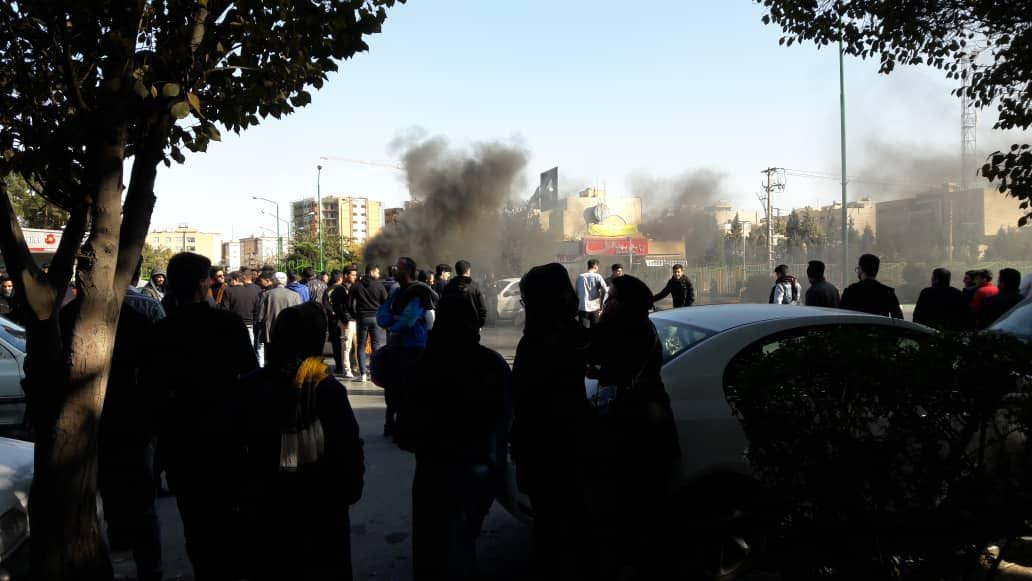
November 2019 demonstrations, Isfahan

On 10 December 2019 the Committee to Protect Journalists (CPJ), which is a human rights organization based in New York City, put Iran among the countries with the highest number of imprisoned journalists.

The Kurdistan Human Rights Network has stated that many detained protesters, some of them underage, are held under gruelling conditions. In addition, sources have characterized conditions in the Greater Tehran Central Penitentiary as "unbearable".

In addition to the first phase of arrests during the demonstrations, the security forces examined photographs of licence plates taken during the protests "to identify leaders and speak to informants to identify more" protesters to arrest.

Many observers are worried that some of those arrested have undergone severe torture and may face execution.

On 2 September 2020, Amnesty International accused the Iranian government of widespread abuse of human rights during the 2019 protests that were sparked following soaring fuel prices. According to latest rights group report, Iran resorted to arbitrary detention, enforced disappearance, torture and other ill-treatment of those involved in the November unrest that rocked the Islamic Republic.

=== Arrest of journalists and lawyers ===
The European Parliament condemned the government of Iran for harassment of lawyers and journalists, and for denying legal assistance to the large number of protesters already in jail.

The International Observatory of Human Rights have claimed that while social media has been a tool for exposing injustices in the state, those who do so risk being arrested and imprisoned. The few remaining independent news sources face harassment and the risk of arrest.

In 2021, Reporters without Borders (RSF) ranked Iran 174th out of 180 countries on the RSF 2020 World Press Freedom Index; they were placed at 173rd and 170th in 2020 and 2019 respectively. According to RSF, at least 860 journalists and citizen-journalists have been detained or executed since 1979, with an unrelenting state control of news continuing.

In the run-up to the 2021 election in Iran, the pressure of the state to control journalists intensified. Between 16 May and 17 June, RSF received 42 cases of journalists receiving summonses from the prosecutor's office or threats from intelligence ministry officials.

On 14 August 2021, the Centre for Human Rights in Iran reported that four lawyers had been arrested alongside two political activists. They were preparing to sue the Iranian Government for its handling of the COVID-19 Pandemic but were arrested by judicial agents and pressured to drop the suit before it was filed. During the arrest several of the detainees personal items were confiscated without a warrant and the public is yet to be made aware of official charges against the lawyers.

=== International organizations warn about torture ===
In a new statement Amnesty International has spoken about constant torture exerted on thousands arrested during November Uprising. The statement says, "they have been beaten, punched, kicked and flogged by security forces". Detainees include children of 15 and younger.

On 28 December 2019, international human rights watchdog has warned prisoners in Iran's jails "are at risk of being tortured".

=== Allegations of sexual violence ===
In January 2020, Amnesty International's investigator on Iran, Raha Bahreini, said she had received reports that a woman protester, detained during anti-government demonstrations following the downing of a Ukrainian passenger plane, had been taken to a police station and sexually assaulted by security forces.

== Deaths and casualties ==
=== Death count estimates ===
Deaths numbers by provinces 40 or more people killed Between 30 and 39 people killed Between 20 and 29 people killed Between 10 and 19 people killed Between 1 and 9 people killed No Data

The BBC has reported that there is a huge variance in reports of the number of people killed in the protests. On 23 December, Reuters reported that a death toll provided by three unnamed Iranian interior ministry officials was "about 1,500" including "at least 17 teenagers and about 400 women". These numbers were described as "fake news" by a government spokesman and based on figures made by the MEK a week prior. Amnesty International reported that "according to credible reports ... at least 304 people were killed and thousands injured between 15 and 18 November".

The BBC has reported that unofficial reports from various sources say that from 15 to 19 November, about 200 people were killed and 3,000 injured. However, later the Iranian government released some details of 304 deaths during the protest, and Amnesty International found that more than 220 of the recorded deaths took place over just two days on 16 and 17 November. One anonymous dissident politician told US journalist Dexter Filkins that he thinks the higher death estimates may be more accurate as in one location "two hundred people" were buried in "a single night".

The Iranian government has announced that 230 persons were killed, including at least six police officers and soldiers.

A man in Sirjan was killed and several others were injured after security forces opened fire on protesters on 15 November. The following day, ten protesters were killed during demonstrations.

On 19 November, Amnesty International claimed that around 16 people were killed in Kermanshah, 14 each in Bandar-e Mahshahr and in Javanroud, 9 in Mariwan, 8 in Behbahan, 6 each in Ramhormoz, Sadra and in Shiraz, 4 each in Bukan, Karaj and in Robatkarim, 3 in Khorramshahr, 2 each in Abadan, Ahvaz and in Bumahen, and 1 each in Tehran, Isfahan, Eslamshahr, Sanandaj, Shahriar and in Sirjan. According to witness evidence reported in mid-late December, the Bandar-eMahshar death toll was much higher than initially estimated. The Iranian government brought in tanks to the streets of the city and security forces and the IRGC used heavy machine guns against unarmed people, leading to the death of 40–100 people.

As of 26 November, Amnesty International reported that over 100 people had been killed during the protests, including accounts of wounded or dead protesters removed by government authorities to hide the magnitude of the crackdown on protesters. According to the BBC Persian, the number of deaths has exceeded 200.

According to a report by The Guardian from Shiraz on 1 December, "those on the ground" in the city say the death toll is much higher than the 15 confirmed deaths counted by Amnesty International.

Amnesty International reported that the Iranian government threatened families of the killed protestors against talking to the press. The families were forced to not arrange any funerals and to instead to carry out secret burials.

Speaking at a news conference at the State Department on 5 December, U.S. Special Representative for Iran Brian Hook stated that Iranian government forces killed more than 1,000 protesters. There were reports by US-backed Radio Farda that by 5 December 18 children had been killed by the Iranian government.

As Reuters has reported, on the second day of Iran protest, in the presence of president Hassan Rouhani, some of his ministers and commanders of the security forces, asserting the government was in total danger, Supreme Leader Ali Khamenei called to crush the demonstrators, stating "You have my order [...] Do whatever it takes to end it". According to Reuters and the MEK, at least 1,500 people, including 400 women and 17 teenagers, were killed in the uprising and that "many were shot directly in the head".

=== Death of injured protesters ===
Human Rights organizations, including Amnesty International, reported that many Iranian protesters wounded in November demonstrations still could not get medical attention as they may get arrested. Two injured protesters, 23-year-old Mohammad Maleki, and Amir Ojani, 43 years old, died in the last days of January due to an acute infection and respiratory diseases.

=== Killing of children ===
On 3 March 2020, Amnesty International announced that security forces in Iran killed at least 23 children during November uprising in this country. The victims were 22 boys of age 12 to 17 and a girl who was under 12 years old.

=== Government responsibility ===
Reuters reports that Iran's supreme leader, Ali Khamenei, and President Hassan Rouhani ordered deadly weapons be used against the protesters. The order was "confirmed by three sources close to the supreme leader's inner circle and a fourth official, set in motion the bloodiest crackdown on protesters since the Islamic Revolution in 1979". Khamenei, in a meeting with government officials on 17 November 2019, ordered an end to the protests, saying "The Islamic Republic is in danger, do whatever is necessary to end these protests. This is my order." According to the report, Khamenei, who was outraged by protesters tearing down his posters in the streets and the destruction of a statue of Ruhollah Khomeini, told officials in a meeting he would hold them responsible if the protests did not stop immediately.

Khamenei has allegedly later stated "the decision to use force was not his", but critics have noted that it is the "Supreme National Security Council" that makes decisions on how to deal with such demonstrations and deal with the political crisis in Iran. The council is presided by the president. Iran's constitution prescribes that all decisions taken by the council should be approved by Khamenei. who is also Commander-in-Chief of the Iranian Armed Forces.

The government agents in Iran were accused of stealing the bodies of the dead protesters from morgues, and arresting the injured from hospitals, to give the uprising a lower profile.

== Aftermath ==
Iranian news agency claimed that starting from 19 November 2019, thousands of people in cities across Iran participated in separate pro-government rallies in condemnation of the riots and showed support for the Iran supreme leadership. On 20 November 2019, Iranian President Hassan Rouhani declared victory against the "enemy". Iran started gradually restoring internet connection the following day. Many supporters (including IRGC leader Hossein Salami) also called for the death penalty on anti-government protesters.

Amnesty International stated on 16 December that one month after the uprising, Iranian security forces are still arresting people and especially youth. Prisons, such as Fashafouyeh prison near the capital Tehran, are overcrowded with detainees, among them juveniles of 15 and younger. Prisoners are faced with daily torture and harassment.

=== Impacts ===
The savings from the fuel price rises are planned to be distributed to 18 million poor families, representing 75% of Iran's population. However, with inflation already at 40% and a plummeting currency, according to The Economist, "the inflationary effects of the price rise risk wiping out most of the benefit." This inflationary threat has been acknowledged by Khamenei.

=== Debate in the Iranian parliament ===
Several criticisms of the Iranian authorities were made in December 2019 by members of the Islamic Consultative Assembly, the Iranian parliament. On 9 December 2019, Parvaneh Salahshouri, a female member of the parliament spoke against the country's top officials accusing them of not understanding the griefs of the low-income people and ignoring the deep-seated glitches of the country.

On 10 December 2019, Ali Motahari, a member of Iran's parliament spoke out against the policies of the Supreme Leader and that entities under Khamenei's control have created a stalemate in the parliament. In return, another hardliner has asked the Guardian Council to disqualify Motahari as a candidate for the upcoming elections for his "accuses the Supreme Leader in the gasoline issue".

Fears that mass uprising could ignite again created conflicts within the Iranian ruling system. In early December 2019, Mahmood Alavi, the Intelligence Minister, has sent a letter to the speaker of the parliament asking him to stop Mahmoud Sadeghi, a member of Parliament, for acting "against national interests". Since the protests began in November, Sadeghi continued his attacks against some government entities, including the intelligence system. Sadeghi has also spoken against the forced confessions run by the Ministry of Intelligence and shown on state television.

== Reactions ==
=== National ===
- Supreme Leader of Iran, Ali Khamenei
  - blamed the protests on "all of the centres of villainy around the world that oppose us."
  - "Both friends and foes should know that we have repelled the enemy in the war in military, political and security issues. The recent actions were security issues, not from the people. We have repelled the enemy in various areas, and by God's grace, we will also definitely repel the enemy in the economic war", (from a meeting with producers, economic activists and entrepreneurs on 19 November).
  - he also stated that setting fire to banks is not the action of ordinary people but of thugs, adding, "of course, officials should also pay attention and decrease the problems associated as much as they can" (from the beginning of Dars-e Kharej (courses at the highest level of religious curriculum taught to students at seminaries) on 17 November).
- Parvaneh Salahshouri, a member of parliament, stated that the decision to increase the price of fuel was not made by the Majles and had been made by the heads of the three branches. Salahshouri stated, "It has been a while now that parliament is not involved in the decision-making process." She continued and, referring to the parliament, said, "The last semblance of a democracy we had is no more. Shut down the next parliament, it is an act of economic resistance".
- Grand Ayatollah Mohammad Alavi Gorgani asked the government to "change their decision to increase fuel prices before it is too late".
- Abolfazl Bahrampour, prominent Iranian Quran scholar, stated that the arrested protesters are Muharib and do not deserve normal execution, but must be tortured to death by mutilation of their right hands and left feet. He made these comments in the Iranian state-sponsored IRIB TV1 citing the 33rd Ayah of Al-Ma'ida Surah: "... The only punishment of those who wage war against Allah and His Messenger and strive to make mischief in the land is that they should be murdered, or crucified, or their hands and their feet should be cut off on opposite sides ...".
- Dozens of artists living inside Iran published a statement in support of protesters, saying they will not forget the young faces of the dead, who were killed and then ignored by associating them with "foreigners". The statement condemned the violation of the people's "most basic human rights" and their "most apparent needs", and warned that people's voices "will remain in history". Prominent filmmakers including two-time Oscar winner Asghar Farhadi and Berlinale-winner Jafar Panahi, as well as well-known musicians Hossein Alizadeh and Kayhan Kalhor, are among the signatories of the statement. The statement also ridicules speeches by Iranian officials who have blamed protesters as being agents of foreign states, saying "the regime is trying to justify killing them".
- Iranian Interior Minister Abdolreza Rahmani Fazli in the Iranian parliament, in response to parliamentarians who had been shot in the brain by a number of people, asked if it was possible to shoot, at least in the legs or lower back, that such shootings had taken place? Ali replied that the protesters had also been shot in the leg!
- In another response from Iran's Interior Ministry, Roohallah Jomei told a meeting with members of Iran's parliament that 23 percent of protesters were shot at close range and in temples.
- In a comment to an American reporter (Dexter Filkins) an (anonymous Iranian) shop owner in the suburbs of Tehran who had witnessed the protests stated "The 2009 protests showed that the regime had lost the middle class. The protests in November show that they've lost the working class, too."

==== University students ====
On 7 December 2019, commemorating the student's day, university students in various parts of Iran organized rallies shouting slogans against Hassan Rouhani and chief Justice Ebrahim Raeesi. Students also condemned the government for shooting and killing people during recent demonstrations.

==== Bus drivers ====
On 2 December 2019, the Tehran bus drivers' trade union called for the trial of those who ordered the shooting of the protesters. The union described the government's actions as a "massacre and bloody suppression". The statement by the Syndicate of Tehran and Suburbs Bus Company, also expressed concern about the situation of the thousands of detained protesters.

==== Lawyers ====
On 10 December 2019, 160 Iranian lawyers called for an investigation into the November killings. The lawyers also called for information regarding the several thousand detained protestors.

==== Mournings ====
Iranian regime threatens the families of those killed in recent protests not to talk to reporters or others. Nevertheless, families of young people killed by the regime's security forces are not giving in. Mother of Pooya Bakhtiari, killed by government agents, says her son was a "national hero". She continued that her son pursued "freedom, justice and truth", something that Iran's authorities will not grant to the people.

=== Diaspora ===
- Reza Pahlavi, the exiled son of Iran's deposed Shah, tweeted that the Islamic Republic had brought only poverty and suffering to the Iranian people. He also said that the only thing offered for free by the Islamic Republic was oil to its allies in the region, a reference to Syria's president Bashar al-Assad.
- Golshifteh Farahani, an Iranian actress who has been living in exile in France for the past decade, also carried out an extensive interview about the violent response to protests and the high number of people killed, wounded, or arrested. Speaking to Brut America, Farahani explained that many protesters started demonstrating because of a hike in gas prices, but "never came back home". In the video, the actress stated that the killed protesters were "son of some people", "fathers of some people", "daughters of some people", and "they are dead now".
- Hichkas, Iranian rapper released a song about the recent protests and the inequality that plagues the Iranian society. In the song, titled "Clenched His Fists", the exiled rapper states the various grievances that led to the demonstrations and describes the brutality of the security forces. The song is in the spoken word format and includes audio snippets recorded by protesters on the street, where voices can be heard saying "they are shooting people".

=== International ===
==== States ====
- United States:
  - U.S. President of the United States Donald Trump announced his support for the protests stating "Iran has become so unstable that the government has shut down their entire Internet System so that the Great Iranian people cannot talk about the tremendous violence taking place within the country...."
  - U.S. Secretary of State Mike Pompeo supported the demonstrations and stated that "The United States is with [the Iranian people]". In a Tweet from late December 2020, he stated a figure of 1,500 casualties of the protests.
  - The Democratic presidential candidate Bernie Sanders criticized the Iranian government for not letting its civilians protest for a "better future" and to stop "showing violence against demonstrators".
  - On 3 December, US President Donald Trump, while attending NATO summit in London, said, "Iran is killing perhaps thousands and thousands of people right now as we speak".
  - The United States said that the Iranian government had committed "gross human rights violations" during the protests.
- European Union:
  - Josep Borrell, European Union's new High Representative for Foreign Affairs has condemned the use of deadly force by the Iranian regime against peaceful demonstrators.
  - Almost all political groups and tendencies in the European Parliament voted in favour of a resolution which condemned the Iranian government for its extensive use of force against peaceful protesters in November uprising. European lawmakers called for an independent investigation into atrocities including direct shooting at demonstrators. The resolution calls on the Iranian government "to announce the total number of detainees". The European parliament condemned the government of Iran for harassment of lawyers and journalists, and for denying legal assistance to the large number of protesters already in jail.
- Germany: Chancellery urged Iran to respect the "legitimate" protests against a petrol price hike and open talks with the demonstrators: "It is legitimate and deserving of our respect when people courageously air their economic and political grievances, as is currently happening in Iran," said Chancellor Angela Merkel's spokeswoman, Ulrike Demmer.
- Sweden: Swedish Foreign Minister Ann Linde wrote on Twitter: "Terrible casualties in Iran. Nothing can justify this violence. Today's ambassador to Sweden from Our view is informed."

==== Supernationals ====
- United Nations: The UN High Commissioner for Human Rights Michelle Bachelet expressed her "deep concern" about the treatment of the large number of people arrested in the demonstrations. She also expressed concern about torture or execution of detainees.
- Amnesty International started a petition in which human rights organisations asked United Nations (UN) member states to condemn the Iranian government for the crackdown on the unarmed protesters in the November uprising. The signatories include International Federation for Human Rights (FIDH), Human Rights Watch (HRW), Justice for Iran and Amnesty International. "There must be independent and impartial investigations into these killings, and those suspected of ordering and carrying them out must be prosecuted in fair trials," said Philip Luther, Research and Advocacy Director for the Middle East and North Africa at Amnesty International, in response to the killing of at least 23 children by security forces.

=== Sanctions after November uprising ===
The United States implemented sanctions on Mohammad-Javad Azari Jahromi, Iran's communications minister, following the deactivation of internet servers inside Iran.

On 19 December 2019, the United States Government enforced sanctions on two Iranian judges, Abolghassem Salavati and Mohammad Moghisseh, for suppressing "freedoms of speech and assembly". Thousands of people are now in Iran's jails just for participating in November uprising. They may face torture or even execution. The two judges have long records of issuing long term prison sentences or death penalties for Iranians longing for democracy and opposed to the rule of the Supreme Leader, Ali Khamenei.

== See also ==
- Iran student protests, July 1999
- 2009 Iranian presidential election protests
- 2016 Cyrus the Great Revolt
- 2017–2018 Iranian protests
- 2017–2019 Iranian protests against compulsory hijab
- 2018–2019 Iranian general strikes and protests
- 2018 Dervish protests
- 2018 Khuzestan protests
- 2018 Iranian water protests
- 2021–2022 Sistan and Baluchestan protests
- 2021–2022 Iranian protests
- 2022 Mahsa Amini protests
- Human rights in Iran
- Internet censorship in Iran
- Mahsa Amini protests
- #StopExecutionsinIran
- Abduction of bodies by the Islamic Republic of Iran
