= Roohallah Jomei =

Iranian journalist and politician

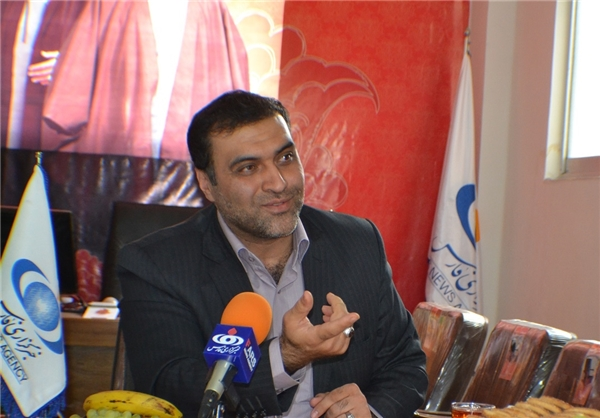

Adviser to the Minister
- In office November 24, 2015 – August, 2021
- Minister: Abdolreza Rahmani Fazli

Head of the Information and International Affairs Center of the Ministry of Interior
- In office October 1, 2014 – November 24, 2015
- Minister: Abdolreza Rahmani Fazli
- Preceded by: Hassan Asl Mand
- Succeeded by: Babak Dinparast

Deputy IRNA News Agency
- In office July 20, 2008 – June 12, 2009

Personal details
- Born: 5 April 1974 (age 52) Tehran, Iran
- Party: Iranian Principlists
- Occupation: journalist

Roohallah Jomei (Persian: روح الله جمعه ای) is an Iranian journalist and politician. He has been the Deputy Minister and Advisor to the Minister of Interior of the Islamic Republic of Iran and has also been the Deputy Chief of Staff of the Islamic Islamic Republic News Agency. His controversial remarks have been repeatedly covered by the media.

== 2009 presidential election ==
He spoke about the illegal efforts of Mahmoud Ahmadinejad and the Presidential Administration to announce his victory before the official election results. He said that on 2009 June 12, he was told by the presidential administration to publish the news of Ahmadinejad's victory on the news agency of the Islamic Republic of Iran before the end of the voting, which he objected to. He says that the pressure from the institution of the Islamic Republic of Iran to the point of threat that eventually issued an order to publish this news in any way possible. He left the IRNA news agency at 10 pm to protest the involvement of behind-the-scenes agents in the official information, and this was published a few minutes later, in a situation where polling stations in many parts of Tehran were voting. .

This suspicious act became one of the suspicions of fraud after the elections.

== 2019–2020 protests ==
=== Reaction to the remarks of the spiritual advisor ===
Ali, in response to the remarks of Rouhani's media advisor, Hesamuddin Ashna, who had spoken in an interview with Andisheh Pouya monthly about the lack of accurate statistics on the deaths in November 2020 said: And has provided the exact pathology of the November events and the performance of the various departments involved in the matter to all relevant officials and officials, including the President.

=== Letter to the Deputy Speaker of the Iranian Parliament ===
In a letter to Ali Motahari, who in his last speech in the 10th parliament again blamed the Ministry of Interior for suppressing the November 1998 protests, he asked the question: Do you consider the threat and attack on the grain warehouse and food and the destruction of public and government property, especially the economic, security and law enforcement centers, and even ordinary people, as negligence in performing their duties?

A part of this letter states:

"Certainly, as a person who spent most of his life in the parliament in the guise of the deputy speaker of the Islamic Consultative Assembly, you were fully informed of all the laws and regulations of the country and had access to numerous reports."

"The decision to increase the price of gasoline can be divided into three periods before the decision is made, the moment of the official announcement of the price increase and finally the measures considered after the price increase until before the start of subversive disturbances."

=== Shooting in the migrant's migraine in November 2019–2020 ===
Roohallah Jomei said in a meeting with Iranian MP Mahmoud Sadeghi that 23 percent of protesters were shot at close range during the 2019–2020 Iranian protests. He also said that 16 percent of those killed in the November incidents were killed in attacks on military bases and 31 percent were destroyed or attacked in public and municipal facilities. He said some members of the parliament's National Security and Foreign Policy Commission were aware of the issue of gasoline quotas.

==== Impugn ====
In an interview with Fars News Agency, in addition to denying, he said that the published article about his statements about the events of November 1998 was untrue, distorted and fragmented.

== Arrest news ==
An unconfirmed news of his arrest was published by the Revolutionary Guards Intelligence Organization of the Islamic Revolutionary Guard Corps, which soon published a denial of his arrest on Telegram pages. The news website Amadnews quoted an informed source as saying: "Mr. jomei, after learning of the strong rumors of his arrest in a telegram group close to the Presidential Administration of Iran and publishing it on some websites, referred to Interior Minister Abdolreza Rahmani Fazli and his source. He shared this rumor with him. During a telephone call with his advisor, Parviz Ismaili, the interior minister asked him to explain the reason for the publication of the news, which Ismaili said was due to a mistake made by his colleague. "After accepting this mistake, the news of the arrest of this senior government official was removed from the secret telex output of the Islamic Republic of Iran News Agency (IRNA) with the help of Parviz Ismaili."
