= Kangan gas field =

Natural gas field in Iran

Kangan
- Country: Iran
- Region: Bushehr Province
- Offshore/onshore: onshore
- Coordinates: 27.833333°N 52.05°E
- Operators: South Zagros Oil & Gas Production Company

Field history
- Discovery: 1967
- Start of production: 1980

Production
- Current production of gas: 23×10^{6} m^{3}/d 800×10^{6} cu ft/d 8.4×10^{9} m^{3}/a (300×10^{9} cu ft/a)
- Estimated gas in place: 829×10^{9} m^{3} 29×10^{12} cu ft

The Kangan gas field is an Iranian natural gas field that was discovered by the NIOC-EGOCO consortium (contract signed in March 1969) with the Kangan #2 well drilled in 1972. It began production in 1980 and produces natural gas and condensates. The total proven reserves of the Kangan gas field are around 29 trillion cubic feet (829 billion m^{3}) and production is slated to be around 800 million cubic feet/day (23 million m^{3}). Nar gas field is located a few kilometers away from kangan gas field. That's why Nar & Kangan appear together most of the time. The produced gas from Nar & Kangan fields delivers to Fajr gas refinery in the downstream. Nar & Kangan is the major onshore natural gas provider for domestic consumption. The two fields together hold the record of maximum gas production rate from onshore fields in Iran, 120 million cubic meter per day at standard conditions.
