= Mahshahr massacre =

Massacre in Mahsharh, Iran in November 2019

- Part of the 2019–2020 Iranian protests
- Location: Mahshahr, Iran
- Date: 16–20 November 2019
- Deaths: 40–148
- Injuries: Unknown
- Perpetrator: Islamic Revolutionary Guard Corps

The Mahshahr massacre (Persian: قتل‌عام ماهشهر) refers to the mass killing of protesters in the city of Mahshahr, Iran, which occurred between 16 November and 20 November 2019, during the 2019–2020 Iranian protests. Estimates of fatalities range between 40 and 148.

== History ==
Protests erupted across Iran on 15 November 2019, after the government announced a sudden gasoline price hike, spreading to more than 100 cities nationwide. The protests quickly extended into opposition to Supreme Leader Ali Khamenei and the current government.

Internet inside the country was completely shutdown by the government on 16 November which made reporting on the details nearly impossible.

During the first few days of demonstrations in Mahshahr in mid-November, protesters gained control over much of the city. Security forces clashed with protesters in Mahshahr on 16 and 17 November, and attempted to suppress protests between 16 and 18 November in the suburbs of Sarbandar and Jarahi.

The New York Times, based on interviews with residents, including a journalist and a nurse at the hospital where casualties of the crackdown were treated, dated the arrival of a large force of Revolutionary Guards to 18 November. According to The New York Times, Revolutionary Guard forces entered Shahrak Chamran, a suburb of Mahshahr, and indiscriminately shot at protesters, several who died. Other protesters gathered in a marsh near the location of the initial killing. One protester, "apparently armed with an AK-47", according to The New York Times, fired at the Revolutionary Guards. Iranian state media described the protesters in these events as a "separatist group" armed with "semi-heavy weapons."

The Revolutionary Guards responded immediately by encircling the protesters in the marsh and shot them with machine guns and DShKs mounted on their patrols, killing 100. The Guards carried the dead away on "a truck" and left, while families of survivors carried them to Memko Hospital.

According to Iranwire, some of the security forces involved were killed.

A second lethal incident took place in the Shahrak Taleghani district of Mahshahr on 19 November, in which Revolutionary Guards arrived in tanks and carried out an hours-long gun battle against local ethnic Arabs. One senior Guards commander was killed. A protest organiser interviewed by The New York Times was shot in the ribs during the battle. A nurse stated to The New York Times that she had treated people wounded in the battle and most had head and chest gunshot wounds. Some of the wounded protesters were arrested in the hospital.

== Casualties ==
Initial reports from Mahshahr suggested that over 130 protesters had been killed by security forces in the three days of fighting. The New York Times report, which was published two weeks after the incident, suggested that between 40 and 100 protesters had been killed in Mahshahr and its suburbs. On 17 December 2019, an anonymous unnamed official from the province of Khuzestan told IranWire that a total of 148 protesters had lost their lives during five days of protests in Mahshahr.

== Aftermath ==
On 25 November, Mohamad Golmordai, Mahshahr representative in the Iranian parliament, expressed his anger at the massacre in a speech in parliament that was broadcast on state television. He "screamed", according to The New York Times, "What have you done that the undignified Shah did not do?".

On 18 January 2020, the U.S. State Department sanctioned Brigadier General Hassan Shahvarpour, as being responsible for the Massacre of Mahshahr.

== See also ==
- 2019–2020 Iranian protests
- Political repression in the Islamic Republic of Iran
