= Burnt Generation =

Iranian generational classification

In Iran, the Burnt Generation (Persian: نسل سوخته, Nasl-e Sukhteh) is the generation born between roughly 1966 and 1988, having experienced the Iranian Revolution, Iran–Iraq War, and political or social consequences of these such as the Iran hostage crisis, the 1980 Iranian Embassy Siege, the Iranian Cultural Revolution, 1988 executions of political prisoners, the 1989 fatwa against Salman Rushdie, and the Islamic revival, as children, teenagers and later as young adults. These events proved fundamental in deciding the poor prospects and pessimistic outlook of this generation as they entered the workforce in Iran at the end of the 1980s and throughout the 1990s.

This generation resonates with Generation X and Millennials in the Western world. The earlier members of this cohort (roughly 1966 to 1979) were born at a time when the country was ruled by the Pahlavi Dynasty. On the other hand, the second half of the cohort (born from 1979 to 1988) were born at a time of great social, political, economic, and religious turbulence in Iran, and in their early childhood were only accustomed to the turmoil of the period.

== Childhood ==
As younger children, the older cohort of the Burnt Generation shaped their future dreams based on their parents' values and lifestyle. These values described success, convenience, and social acceptance as achievable goals through hard work and education. Their parents, a Baby Boomer–like generation, had rebuilt the country after World War II, established public education, a secular society, as well as an industrialized one, significantly advanced women's rights, nationalized the oil industry, and enhanced the public health system. As such, their parents in adulthood lived through and enjoyed the benefits the White Revolution brought to Iran in the 1960s and 1970s, including a high standard of living and stable, well-paying employment. Therefore, the older cohort was able to enjoy to some extent a prosperous early childhood, but after the Revolution suddenly found their entire lives in turmoil at a young age. Although by the late 1970s, in the aftermath of the 1973 oil crisis, there was a steadily growing dissatisfaction with the government and the Shah's approach to a variety of political and social issues, as well the system of absolute monarchy in Iran, the assumption that the parents of the Burnt Generation made at the time was that those issues would be resolved through a democratic system.

== Iranian Revolution ==
During the Revolution, and after the Shah was overthrown, the chaos that erupted in Iran, resulting in the consolidation of the Revolution, violence between various political groups and the new government, and the outbreak of the Iran-Iraq War, as well as the rapid change in values in Iran, created a chaotic environment that deeply affected the beliefs and values of the Burnt Generation. As such, during this period, they were notably a religious generation, seeking comfort in religion, resulting in them sharing much of the Islamic Republic's ideological beliefs in the 1980s and in the first half of the 1990s. Due to the turmoil of the late 1970s and 1980s in Iran, the Burnt Generation experienced significant trauma and loss when they were young - it was common to witness much of their family be killed or displaced during the Iran-Iraq War. As such, they have notably poor mental health, having high amounts of wartime trauma and PTSD from the war, though much of it remains undiagnosed due to the sense of repression many in the generation imposed on themselves.

The aftermath of the Revolution, particularly the Cultural Revolution and the shutting down of colleges and universities for several years in the 1980s, as well as the significant impact the war had in limiting education for many young Iranians, resulted in some of the generation receiving a poor education. As they grew up, the Burnt Generation were forced to be resilient - the war in particular contributed to a sense of resilience amongst children growing up throughout the 1980s. They are often recognized as such in Iran for possessing strong resilience and adaptability to cope with situations of turmoil. In recent years, they have come to take on more positions of power in the country due to such resilience.

== Adulthood and economic prospects ==
As they entered adulthood at the end of the 1980s, and throughout the 1990s, some began to grow suspicious of authority and established themselves as politically alienated from Iran's political realities. In the 1990s, with the war over and Khomeini's death in 1989 resulting in the establishment of debate over the future of the Islamic Republic, some grew defiant of the values they had once submissively adhered to in their youth, culminating in the 1999 student protests. They progressively grew angrier at Iran's stagnating economy and leadership. For much of their adult life, especially in the 1990s and into the 2000s, they have struggled to find employment; in 2008 unemployment amongst the generation ran at 50 percent, and officially half the population lived below the poverty line.

== Later life and attitudes ==
Today, as they approach being middle-aged, some members of the Burnt Generation are marked by a lack of optimism for the future, nihilism, cynicism, skepticism, political apathy, resilience, alienation, and distrust in traditional values and institutions, which describe the similarities between Gen X and the Burnt Generation.
