= Esmail Bakhshi =

Iranian activist

- Born: 18 June 1983 (age 42); Haft Tappeh, Khuzestan, Iran
- Occupations: Worker, Labor Unionist
- Known for: Spokesman for Workers Union of Haft Tappeh Sugarcane Agro Industrial Complex

Esmail Bakhshi (Persian: اسماعیل بخشی; born 18 June 1983) is an Iranian activist, political prisoner, trade unionist, and a founding member and the independent Workers Union of Haft Tappeh Sugarcane Agro Industrial Company (Persian: شرکت نیشکر هفت‌تپه) in the Khuzestan Province of Iran.

== Arrests ==
On November 18, 2018 Esmail Bakhshi was arrested, together with more than a dozen other workers, during labor protests at the local sugar factory in the Iranian city of Shush. All of those arrested were soon released on bail with the notable exception of Esmail Bakhshi who was held, without charge or legal representation, on the suspicion of crimes against "national security". The Iranian Ministry of Labor announced that it is unable to intervene on Bakhshi's behalf because of the nature of the case.

The workers of Haft Tappeh Sugarcane were protesting several months of unpaid wages following the privatization of the company, with no transparency or oversight, by the Iranian officials.

On November 29, 2018 The Vahed Syndicate, revealed in a statement that Esmail Bakhshi had been briefly hospitalized due to torture he had suffered while in government custody.

=== Context ===
In August 2018, Esmaeil Bakhshi explained in an interview with the left-leaning Persian-language website Meidaan that labor protests at the Haft Tappeh Sugarcane Company go as far back as more than a decade ago, but as of 2018 the protests had become more radical, so much that the entire work force was on strike. As the spokesman for the Haft Tappeh Sugarcane Workers Union, he believed that the inappropriate privatization of the factory was the main driver of protests. Bakhshi maintained that the inefficient management by the new owners and their lack of knowledge about the process of sugar production had created problems for the factory. The decisions of the management were, according to Bakhshi, generally unwise and lead to exploitation of the sugar workers.

The sugar company was founded in the Pahlavi Era as one of the largest industrial undertakings in the Khuzestan province. The government owned the company until 2011. In 2015, it was sold, for an unspecified sum, to two private companies by the Iranian Privatization Organization. According to the workers, privatization only aggravated their problems.

=== Assault by Masked Thugs ===
On January 17, 2018, the Iranian Labor News Agency reported that one of the workers of the Haft Tappeh Sugarcane Complex had been attacked by unidentified men. Labor activists confirmed that Esmaeil Bakhshi, the workers’ representative was the target of this attack. The incident took place on January 15, at around 5:30 pm, as he was leaving work for his home in Dezful. The Haft Tappeh Sugarcane Workers Union reported that after Bakhshi stepped out of the company bus, a group of masked men got out of two cars and physically assaulted him. Bakhshi's shoulder was injured in the incident. The public relations department of Haft Tappeh Sugarcane Company confirmed the attack. During the days before the attack, videos of Bakhshi's speeches had gone viral on the social media.

=== November 2018: First Arrest ===
On November 18, 2018 on the 14th day of Haft Tappeh strike, Esmaeil bakhshi, Mohsen Armand (another trade unionist), Sepideh Gholian and at least another unnamed worker were arrested during a protest. The governor of Khouzestan Province confirmed the arrest of four individuals in connection with the ongoing labor unrest. Although the governor did not mention any names, the union made a press release confirming the names of the arrested individuals and also confirmed that they had been transferred to a Ministry of Intelligence detention center in Sush. Bakhshi and Gholian were held but the others were released a few days later.

Ministry of Labor announced that Bakhshi was held on national security grounds and it was unable to help him.

On November 24, 2018 on the 20th day of protests, the workers held a picket line and rally in front of the offices of the Governor of Shush before marching to a nearby square. By this time the only persons still in detention in connection to the protests were Bakhshi and Gholian.

==== Torture ====
On November 30, 2018, it was reported that Bakhshi had been hospitalized because of internal bleeding caused by torture. Some sources, including The Committee for Establishment of Workers Organizations, had said that Bakhshi was taken to a hospital owned by IRGC.

In response to the reports that Bakhshi had been tortured while in custody, a group of Iranian lawyers and jurists released a public statement and condemned the torture and mistreatment of Esmaeil Bakhshi. In their statement they cited articles 8, 22, 34, 37 and 38 of the Constitution, articles 169 and 578 of the Islamic Penal Code, article 35 of the military penal code, article 5 of the Universal Declaration of Human Rights, the Geneva Conventions of 1966 and 1973 and article 1 of the 1984 Convention against Torture.

While ILNA, a state-owned news agency covering labor, confirmed that Esmail Bakhshi had been hospitalized because he was beaten during interrogation, the governor and the judicial authorities of the Khuzestan Province categorically denied all reports of torture. One of the judicial authorities of the city of Shush even claimed that Bakhshi was in tip-top shape and that the reports of torture were fake news spread enemy media.

On the other hand, the Syndicate of Workers of Tehran and Suburbs Bus Company issued a statement confirming allegations of Bakhshi's torture. In the statement, the syndicate asked the officials to have Bakhshi released. This syndicate emphasized that workers had every right to protest and no worker must be subjected to torture, punishment and arrest. According to this statement that was released on November 24: The Syndicate of Workers of Tehran and Suburbs Bus Company strongly condemns torture and violence against Esmaeil Bakhshi, and demands his immediate and unconditional release. Moreover, all the cases brought against other Haft Tappeh Sugarcane factory workers' representatives must be closed and the prosecution of them must stop.

==== Open Letter to Minister of Intelligence ====
On January 4, 2019 Esmail Bakhshi published a post on his social media page to confirm that he and Sepideh Gholian were tortured while in government custody and challenged the minister of intelligence Mahmoud Alavi to a live television debate on torture of prisoners in the Islamic Republic of Iran. He also described some the psychological and physical tortures they had suffered.

==== Reactions ====
Mohammad Kazemi a member of Majles told ILNA that since torture is banned by the constitution there has to be an investigation of Bakhshi's claims and that if they are proven those responsible must be held accountable.

Gholamreza Shariati, governor of the Khuzestan Province, denied Bakhshi was tortured.

Ali Motahari deputy spokesman of Majles told Etemad that The Ministry of Intelligence should come clear about Bakhshi's allegations. Motahari said that if Bakhshi's claims are true, then those responsible should be punished, and that if Ministry of Intelligence refuses to investigate Majles will step in.

On January 6, Gholamhossein Mohseni-Ezhe'i told a reporter from ILNA: "I've heard about the letter to Ministry of Intelligence and if anyone broke the law they will be punished."

On January 8, Hesamodin Ashna and advisor to the president reacted to Bakhshi's allegations and said that president had ordered an investigation.

However, after members of Majles met with officials from Ministry of Intelligence they announced that the ministry was cleared of the allegations and that Bakhshi was hurt in a fight with agents during his arrest and transfer to prison and not because of torture. They also said that Bakhshi was an instrument of the exiled group Worker-communist Party of Iran. A spokesman for Worker-communist Party immediately denied this claim.

Sepideh Gholian's lawyer wrote that the government officials had prevented his client from having medical tests to document and support her claims about torture.

=== January 2019: Second Arrest ===
Bakhshi and Gholian were arrested again on 20 January 2019. According to Amnesty International, the timing of their arrest strongly suggests it is an attempt to silence and punish them for speaking out about the abuse they suffered in custody. In a phone interview, Gholian's father told a reporter: "At 7 in the morning, 12 male and 2 female officers violently raided my home, broke my son's teeth, assaulted me and my wife, and told us they'd kill our daughter."

On 4 February 2019, it was reported that Bakhshi's health was in serious condition while behind bars.

== See also ==
- Haft Tappeh Union
- 2018–2019 Iranian general strikes and protests
- Ali Nejati
- Sepideh Gholian
- Vahed Syndicate
- Reza Shahabi
