= Ali Nejati =

Iranian labor activist

- Born: Ali Nejati; Haft Tappeh, Khuzestan Province of Iran
- Occupations: Worker, Labor Unionist
- Known for: Former Spokesman for Workers Union of Haft Tappeh Sugarcane Agro Industrial Complex

Ali Nejati (علی نجاتی) is an Iranian labor activist and a member of the managing board of the labor union representing employees of Haft Tappeh Sugarcane Company. Nejati has been active in the Iranian trade unionist movement for over a decade. In the late 2000s, he served as the president of Haft Tappeh Workers Union for a while before he was arrested and imprisoned because of his activism. Most recently, on November 29, 2018 Nejati was arrested and charged with "disrupting public order", "collusion and assembly against national security" and "cooperation in establishing a group intended to disrupt peace and security".

== Haft Tappeh Sugar Cane Workers Union ==
In November 2008, after being inactive for almost 30 years since The Revolution, the Haft Tappeh Workers Union resumed its activities. Despite public opposition from Ministries of Labor and Intelligence of the Mahmoud Ahmadinejad administration, over 1000 workers participated in the election for the managing board of the union. A few days before the election Ali Kordan had declared the formation of independent labor unions a threat to the Islamic Republic. The company management, for its part, had issued a directive prohibiting the workers from unionizing. The workers voted to elect a group that included Ali Nejati as the managing board of the union. Nejati and the majority of the leadership of the union were soon arrested by Iranian security forces and sentenced to prison.

== Arrest by IRGC ==
Nejati was detained by the Revolutionary Guards in 2016 and held without charge or legal representation for 15 days in IRGC's infamous detention centers before he was released on bail. He was eventually charged with the following crimes: "communicating with activists abroad, energizing the workers' movement in northern Khuzestan, organizing May Day and March 8th events, and establishing a small public library in the city of Andimeshk." He was sentenced to six months in prison.

== See also ==
- Haft Tappeh Union
- 2018 Iranian general strikes
- Syndicate of Workers of Tehran and Suburbs Bus Company
- Esmail Bakhshi
- Reza Shahabi
