= Haft Tappeh Sugar Cane Mill Labor Syndicate =

Labor union at the Haft Tappeh sugar cane mill in Ahvaz, Iran

Haft Tappeh Sugar Cane Mill Labor
- Haft Tappeh Sugar Cane Mill Labor Syndicate
- سندیکای کارگران نیشکر هفت تپه
- Headquarters: Ahvaz
- Location: Iran

The Haft Tappeh Sugarcane Agro-industrial Complex Labor Syndicate (سندیکای کارگران نیشکر هفت تپه) is an Iranian trade union. It was established in 1974 to represent the workers of Haft Tappeh Sugarcane Agro-industrial Complex.

== History ==
Haft Tahpeh was founded in the 1960s in the city of Shush, in Khuzestan Province. It is the oldest sugar factory in Iran. Since a questionable 2015 privatization deal, working conditions have worsened. Since the transfer to the present owners, the company’s debts have increased.

== Protest and strike ==
Haft Tappeh workers have used strikes to enhance their wages, pensions and rights.

In 2017 and 2018, they went on strike periodically, protesting unfulfilled promises made by officials.

On 29 November 2018 Iran’s bus drivers’ union announced in a statement that Esmail Bakhshi and Mohsen Armand, activists at Haft Tapeh Sugar Factory had been hospitalized. Bakhshi and other workers were arrested during a protest on November 18..

On 29 November 2018 government forces arrested its senior member Ali Nejati in his house. On December 13, Nejati was transferred to hospital, after a lengthy interrogation.

On 29 December 2018, Nejati's family visited him in jail. They said Nejati, who suffers from a heart problem, is in poor health.

December 2019 Moghiseh, a notorious clergy judge, sentenced Ali Nejati to five years imprisonment. Mr. Nejati, is a member of workers union at Haft-Tapeh Sugar Mill Company. He was arrested during 2018 protests, held by company’s workers, demanding their unpaid salaries. The government has accused Mr. Nejati as “Assembly and Collusion against national security”.

== See also ==
- 2018 Iranian general strikes
- Esmail Bakhshi
