= Sepideh Qolian =

Iranian Political Activist

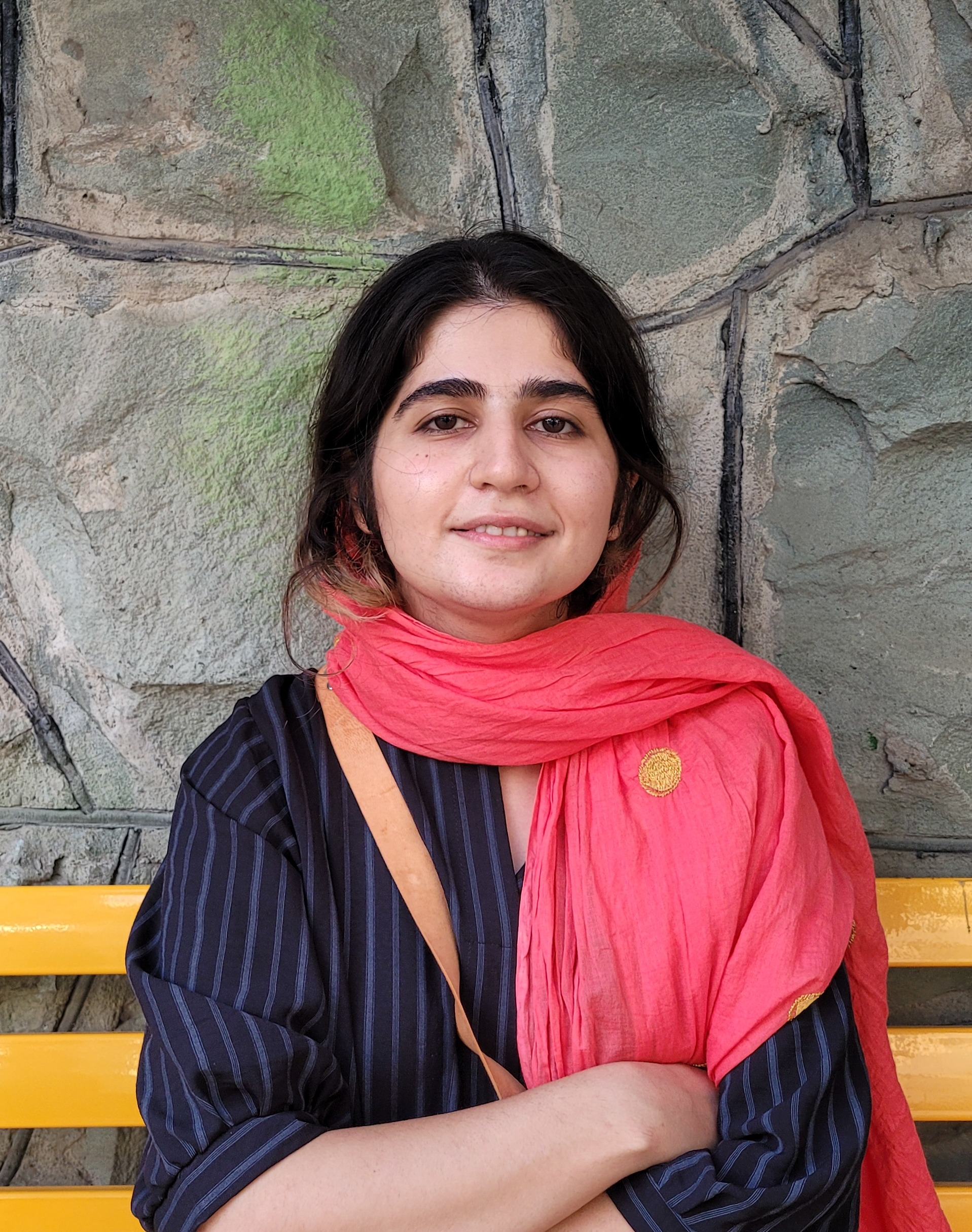
- In December 2019
- Born: September 23, 1994 (age 32); Dezful, Khuzestan Province, Iran
- Occupations: Women's Rights activist Political activist Writer; Artist
- Known for: 2018–2019 Iranian general strikes and protests
- Notable work: Pang Documentary

Sepideh Qolian (Persian: سپیده قلیان, born September 23, 1994 in Dezful), is an Iranian leftist political activist, rusticated veterinary student and journalist from the city of Dezful.

== Activism ==
On November 18, 2018, Sepideh Qolian, who had previously worked with several publications as a citizen journalist, was reporting on a labor protest organized by the Workers Union of Haft Tappeh Sugarcane Agro Industrial Company (Persian: شرکت نیشکر هفت‌تپه), when she was arrested by the Iranian security forces. Union spokesman Esmail Bakhshi and a dozen other trade unionists were also arrested during the protest. All of those arrested, except Qolian and Bakhshi, were released within days. Qolian and Bakhshi were held without charge or legal representation for 30 days and were eventually released on bail.

== Torture ==
On November 29, 2018, while Qolian and Bakhshi were still detained, The Vahed Syndicate, a trade union representing over 17,000 transit workers, revealed in a statement that Esmail Bakhshi had been briefly hospitalized due to torture he had suffered while in government custody. Immediately upon release, Qolian confirmed that both she and Bakhshi had been subjected to torture by the security forces. Following their release on bail, Bakhshi and Qolian gave Amnesty International an account of the torture they suffered while in custody of police and ministry of intelligence officials in the cities of Shush and Ahvaz. They told Amnesty that they had been beaten, slammed against walls, shoved to the ground, humiliated with flogging, and threatened with sexual assault and murder. Qolian stated that during her daily interrogation sessions, which started around 10am and lasted until the early hours of the following morning, intelligence officials repeatedly subjected her to sexual insults such as "whore”, accused her of having sexual relationships with workers, and threatened to make sure that her family would receive information that would make them murder Sepideh for "honor". This revelation led to immense public backlash, especially on Iranian social media. In response to public outrage various Iranian state organizations issued denials of Qolian's accusations and characterized her and Bakhshi as instruments of foreign interest.

On January 19, 2019, the Iranian state television broadcast what it claimed to be a documentary showing that Qolian, Bakhshi, and other activists have connections to the Trump administration, communist groups and other Iranians in diaspora who pursue overthrowing of the Iranian regime. The broadcast, recorded during their detention, contained videos of a visibly distraught Qolian and Bakhshi confessing to their crimes against the state. Qolian responded on Twitter that this broadcast is by itself further proof of torture. Farzaneh Zilabi, Bakhshi's attorney, described the broadcast of statements obtained from her client under duress as a violation of the law. “Broadcasting of this documentary is unjustifiable and unacceptable. Now that the confidential information in this fake case have been made public through a deceptive, selective and unfair documentary, Mr. Bakhshi demands a public and transparent trial.” According to Zilabi, the broadcast was a violation of Article 96 of Iran's Criminal Procedures Regulations, which prohibits and criminalizes to reveal the identity and images of suspects before conviction.

== Rearrest ==
Qolian and Bakhshi were arrested again on January 20, 2019. According to Amnesty International, the timing of their arrest strongly suggests it is an attempt to silence and punish them for speaking out about the abuse they suffered in custody. In a phone interview, Qolian's father told a reporter: "At 7 in the morning, 12 male and 2 female officers violently raided my home, broke my son's teeth, assaulted me and my wife, and told us they'd kill our daughter."

Abolfazl Ghadyani, a former veteran Islamic revolutionary turned dissident, singled out Ali Khamenei as the main culprit behind all wrongdoings and injustices against Bakhshi and Qolian.

After 4 years and nearly 2 months, Qolian was released from Evin prison in Tehran on March 15, 2023. Footage of her chanting anti-Khamenei slogans immediately after her release in front of the prison went viral online. Qolian was arrested again just hours after that, alongside people who took the video of her chanting. in May 5, 2023, Mehdi Gholian, Sepideh's brother, announced on his Instagram page that Sepideh was handed the two-year sentence and now faces another stint in prison before her life could return to normal after her previous incarceration. On June 11, 2025, after 2 years Qolian was released from prison.

== 2026 imprisonment ==
In February 2026, Qolian was sentenced to five years' imprisonment after being arrested at a December 2025 memorial for Khosrow Alikurdi, a human rights lawyer, in Mashhad, alongside Narges Mohammadi and Pouran Nazemi. She was charged with "assembly and collusion to commit crimes against internal and external security" and "propaganda against state". On 30 May 2026, Qolian was released after serving six months of her sentence.

== Awards ==
- In 2022 BBC included Sepideh Qolian in the list of 100 inspiring and influential women from around the world.

== See also ==
- 2018 Iranian general strikes
