= Haft Tappeh Sugarcane Agro-Industry Co. =

Iranian sugar company

- Type: Privately held company (since 2015)
- Industry: Food industry
- Founded: 1975
- Headquarters: Tehran, Iran
- Products: sugar, alcohol, wheat, barley, kraft paper, industrial coal, molasses, bagasse
- Owner: Omid Asadbeigi
- Number of employees: 5,700 formal and contract staff (2020)
- Website: htcs.co

Haft Tappeh Sugarcane Agro-Industry Co (Persian: شرکت کشت و صنعت نیشکر هفت‌تپه) is located in the ancient area of Haft Tappeh and on the remnants of the Elamite civilization. This company is located near the historical city of Susa and Choghaznabil Temple and at a distance of 45 km from Andimeshk road to Ahvaz in Khuzestan province. Residential complexes have been built for employees in this area.

Omid Asadbeigi is currently the owner and CEO of the company.

== History ==
The history of sugarcane cultivation and exploitation in this region goes back to the distant past, but officially this company started its work in 1966. In 1969 and 1970 a Dutch consortium of Stork Sugar and Wescon International has extended the production facilities to a capacity 9,000 tons cane sugar per day. In 1975, it was officially registered in the name of the company to carry out agricultural operations to produce sugarcane and create related industries and products. In 2012, the project of reconstruction and modernization of mechanical equipment to increase sugar production was granted to Industrial Renovation Company of Iran.

== Byproducts ==
Besides production of sugar from sugarcane stalks, other active industries in the region include Pars Paper Factory (paper production using sugarcane pulp called "Bagasse"), Khuzestan Harir Company (production of toilet paper or tissue), livestock and poultry food and molasses production.

== Protests ==
Following the privatization of the Haft Tappeh Sugarcane Agro-industrial Complex and the changing of hands in 2015, the conditions for workers have become increasingly bad. Since then, the Syndicate has gone on strike to improve their members’ working conditions, increase their pay and guarantee their pensions. In 2017, 2018, 2019 and 2020, the Syndicate went on strike periodically, protesting unfulfilled promises made by officials.

In 2018, Haft Tappeh sugarcane workers went on strike for more than fourteen days. Esmail Bakhshi, a representative of the Haft Tappeh Sugarcane workers, and two others were arrested on Sunday, October 23, 2018. Workers demanded the release of detainees during a protest rally in the city of Shush.

On Monday, October 24, 2018. the number of people arrested has reached 29. Workers sat in front of the Shush district court to secure the release of the detainees.

Fifteen detainees were released on October 25, 2018. Following a demonstration by Haft Tappeh sugarcane workers in the city of Shush, but five of them are still in prison.

On Sunday, November 25, 2018, the sugarcane workers of Haft Tappeh, on the 21st day of their strike, demonstrated in the streets of Shush with the slogan "The imprisoned worker must be released." They demanded the expropriation of the private sector from the company as well as the release of Esmail Bakhshi.

On Monday, November 26, 2018, the sugarcane workers of Hafte Tappeh continued their strike and protests and demanded the release of Esmail Bakhshi and Sepideh Qolian.

On Thursday, November 29, 2018, on the twenty-fifth day of the strike, security agents arrested Ali Nejati, a member of the Haft Tappeh Sugarcane Workers' Union, at his home without a warrant for his arrest. And there are reports that Esmaeil Bakhshi, one of the company's workers' representatives, is still arrested and there are some news of him being beaten in prison.

On Saturday, December 1, 2018, Haft Tappeh and Ahwaz Steelworkers in the cities of Shush and Ahwaz protested against the non-fulfillment of their demands. They also demanded the release of imprisoned workers and the payment of their arrears. The workers chanted: "Haft Tappeh prisoner must be released", "Steel, Haft Tappeh, Ittihad Ittihad", "Leave Syria, think about us", "A nation has never seen so much injustice", "We ironworkers are rooting out oppression", "Seven workers The hill must be liberated. "

On October 7, 2019, a number of employees of the complex went to Tehran to meet with the Parliamentary Judiciary Commission and were arrested. Haft Tappeh sugarcane workers went on strike over three months for non-payment of workers' wages, non-renewal of social security and medical records, and uncertainty over their employment status. Workers also demanded the abolition of private ownership of the Haft Tappeh sugarcane company. Friday, June 26, 2020 was the 12th day of the workers' strike.

On Tuesday, June 30, 2020, the workers of Haft Tappeh demonstrated in the streets of Shush, calling on their colleagues to show solidarity with their protest march and the slogan "Worker of Haft Tappeh, Unity, Unity." The workers also chanted, "Death to Rouhani, reduce embezzlement, our problem will be solved," and the workers occupied the streets of Shush while shouting and clapping loudly.

On Thursday, October 29, 2020, four Haft Tappeh labor activists, namely Wasef Bahmani, Hamid Membini, Ebrahim Abbasi Manjezi, and Massoud Hayuri, were arrested by security forces. The arrests followed protests by workers of the company in recent months, who demanded wage arrears, reinstatement of fired employees, job status, cancellation of privatization, and extension of medical coverage.
