= 2018–2019 Iranian general strikes and protests =

Series of strikes and protests across Iran

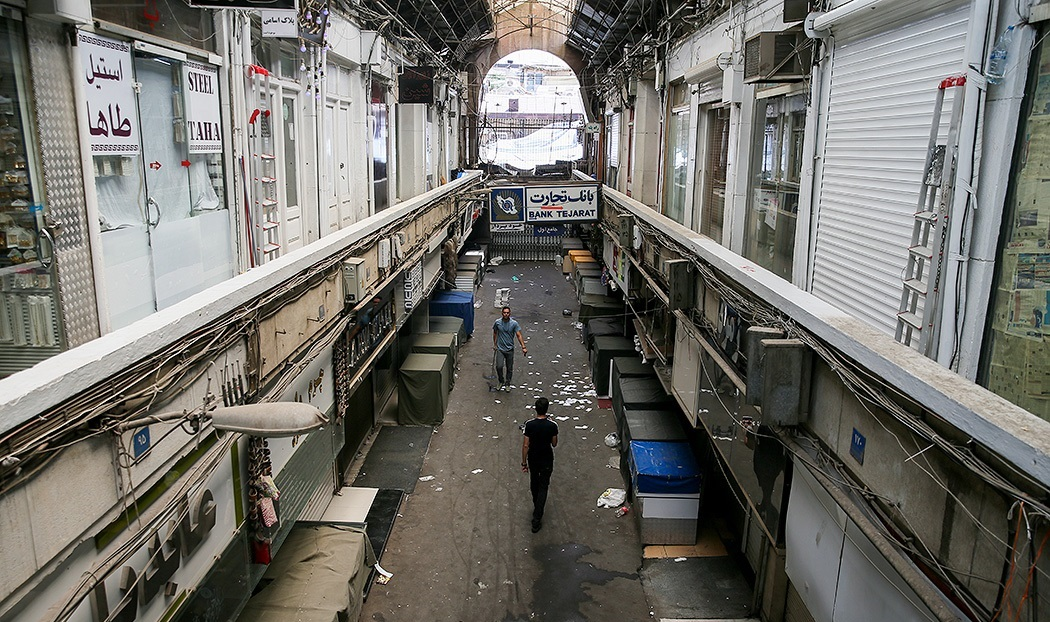
- Closed stores at Tehran Bazaar
- Date: 14 April 2018 – 23 June 2019
- Location: Throughout Iran, especially in bazaars
- Caused by: Economic hardships in Iran; Continued dissatisfaction with the government, especially in the aftermath of previous protests during the Iranian Democracy Movement such as the 2017-2018 Iranian protests; Government corruption
- Goals: Economic stability; Prosecution of corrupt government officials
- Methods: Demonstrations, civil disobedience, strikes
- Result: Continued rise of opposition to the Iranian government; Eventual escalation into the 2018 Iranian water protests and 2019 Iranian protests

Parties
Bazaaris; Workers; Truckers; Teachers; University students Farmers; Women; Bus drivers Railway workers Retirees	Government of Iran; NAJA; AJA; IRGC; VAJA; Ansar-e Hezbollah; Pro government non-Iranian militias; Pro-government protesters

Lead figures
Hashem Khastar (Teachers representative); Esmail Bakhshi (Workers representative); Others	Ali Khamenei; Hassan Rouhani; Abdolreza Rahmani Fazli; Amir Hatami; Mohammad Bagheri; Hossein Ashtari; Abdolrahim Mousavi; Hossein Salami; Mahmoud Alavi; Hossein Allahkaram

Number
Tens of thousands	Tens of thousands of law enforcement and military personnel

Casualties
- Arrested: 10+ in Bazaar strikes 261 truckers 5 Kurdish activists 40+ teachers 61 workers

The 2018–2019 Iranian general strikes and protests were a series of strikes and protests that took place across Iran from early 2018 until mid-2019 as a result of the country's poor economic situation, as well as discontent with the Iranian government. These included protests from truckers, teachers, and workers for better wages, and also include protests against water mismanagement and calls for a better response to water scarcity in Iran. In response, the police suppressed these protests by force.

== Background ==
The 2017-2018 Iranian protests is a wave of protests against the government after egg prices soared and a new budget law was passed, triggering deadly anti-government uprisings across the nation, leaving 23-25 killed in 11 days of mass protests. The 2018 Dervish protests is protests against discrimination that has left 1 dead. The protests was against economic hardships and failures to keep the country thriving.

== Truckers ==
=== First wave ===
On 14 April 2018, truckers launched a wave of strikes in Baneh and Isfahan to protest worsening economic conditions.

Then on 24 May 2018, after the demands from truckers were not met, they again went on strike in Isfahan to reiterate their demand for higher wages. In response, police police crackdown hard on protesters. In late May, Iranian truckers staged a major nationwide strike over low wages and poor working conditions. It lasted until mid-June and was the first in a series of strikes that continued until late 2018.

=== Second wave ===
On 22 September 2018, truckers across several Iranian cities restarted their strikes against the rising expenses of their jobs. On 26 September, the strikes continued and were seen in Ahvaz, Qazvin, Shahreza, Borujerd, and Urmia. 40 to 70 truckers in Fars, Tehran, and Qazvin province were arrested on 27 September, as strikes continued into their fifth day. The Free Truckers Union announced that the strike had spread to 31 provinces across the country. The judiciary stated that those arrested could face the death penalty. On 29 September, on the eight day of the strikes, the number of truckers arrested reached 89.

On 1 October, the truckers strikes reached their 10th straight day and were seen in Bukan, Khosrowshah, Arak, Fooladshahr, Nishapur, Tiran, Takestan, Kermanshah, Sanandaj, Qazvin, Karaj, Bandar Abbas, Ardabil, Dezful, Yazd, and Najafabad. The number of arrested also reached 156. By the 13th straight day of the strike, over 230 truckers were arrested. The strikes continued into 8 October, and reached their 17th consecutive day. Security forces responded by arresting a number of truckers, which increased the number of people arrested to 256.

On 1 November 2018, truckers in Tehran, Zanjan, Isfahan, Asaluyeh, Nahavand, and Shahrud went on strike for the fourth time this year in protest to the arrest of hundreds of truckers in October.

On 21 December, truck drivers across the country started their fifth round of nationwide strikes in protest to inflation and rising expenses.

== Water protests ==
Farmers gathered in Isfahan on 2 January to protest the lack of water in the Zayanderud. The protestors were met by security forces who fired tear gas and live rounds into the air to disperse the crowds.

== Retirees ==
On 22 January, retirees gathered in front of the parliament building in Tehran and chanted "Torture and forced confessions, have no effect anymore".

On 26 February, a large group of retirees gathered in front of the parliament building in Tehran to protest low pensions. Protesters chanted "no nation has seen such a dishonourable parliament" and "shame on those who claim to be the upholders of justice".

On 6 March, Foolad retirees took to the streets in Isfahan due to low pensions. The protestors chanted "Our revolution was a mistake" and "Rouhani the liar, resign".

== Shopkeepers ==
=== June 2018 ===
On 25 June 2018, shops were shut and thousands gathered in the Bazaar area of Tehran to protest the economic situation. This was met with security forces firing tear gas at the protestors. Protests against the economic situation also occurred in Shahriar, Karaj, Qeshm, Bandar Abbas, and Mashhad. Some of the stores were closed enforcedly by unknown individuals.

People in Tehran took to the streets for the third straight day on 26 June, with many shops in Tehran's Bazaar remaining closed. Videos from social media showed the crowd in downtown Tehran chanting "Death to the dictator". Security forces clamped down on the protesters once again, arresting a large number of people. Strikes and protests were also seen in Kermanshah, Arak and Tabriz.

On 27 June, protests continued for a third day in Tehran, despite a heavy security presence, Reuters referred to the three days as "the biggest unrest since the start of the year". Iran's Supreme Leader, Ali Khamenei, addressed the protests for the first time and called on the judiciary to punish those who disrupted economic security. Many of the protests involved traders in the Grand Bazaar in Tehran, who complained that the devaluation of the Iranian rial had forced them to stop trading.

On 28 June, sources told Radio Farda that merchants had closed down the Bazaar in the city of Arak. Tehran's prosecutor general stated that a large number of protesters had been arrested and would likely face trial. Jafar Dolatabadi also stated in an interview that the protesters grievances are not only economic, and that "people are grappling with political and social concerns".

=== Later protests ===
On 11 September 2018, shopkeepers in Iranian Kurdistan initiated a one-day strike in response to the missile attack by the Iranian Revolutionary Guard Corps on the headquarters of the Kurdistan Democratic Party of Iran, and the execution of Ramin Panahi and two other Kurd activists. In response to the strikes, the security forces arrested five Kurdish activists.

On 1 October 2018, Bazaaris in multiple cities across Iran closed their shops and went on strike in protest to the economic situation. Strikes were seen in Sanandaj, Bukan, Saqqez, Marivan, Baneh, Miandoab, Tehran, Isfahan, Mashhad, Tabriz, and Chabahar. The strikes continued into 9 October, although they were reduced in size from the previous day, and were seen in Tabriz, Shahriar, Shahreza, and Sanandaj.

On 4 March 2019, mobile bazars in Tehran, Tabriz, Ahvaz, Mashhad, and Isfahan went on strike to protest the new initiative started by the Ministry of Communications which prevents them from registering the smartphones they want to sell.

On 14 April, shopkeepers closed their stores and shops and went on strike, lasting a total of 20 days.

== Teachers ==
A new protest movement erupted across Iran by tens of thousands of protesting teachers and students, called "No to Pay Slips and Salary Policies" over unpaid and unfair wages for teachers, that lasted for nearly three weeks, teachers are now deprived of an "appropriate salary budget, and as a result, the quality of education has also been lowered for students". The protests began online but after a couple of days of online protests, marches and large demonstrations began on the streets in 15 July, the protests resulted in no achievement in Fars and Qazvin.

On 13 October 2018, teachers across Iran started a two-day nationwide strike in protest to high expenses and inflation. Teachers in Tehran, Mashhad, Tabriz, Isfahan, Shiraz, Kermanshah, Ilam, Yasuj, Sanandaj, Simorgh, Hamedan, Amol, Zarrin Shahr, Gonabad, Eslamabad, Torbat-e Heydarieh, Marivan, Sarvabad, and Garmeh, went on strike. At least two teachers were arrested on the first day of the strike. Teachers went on strike for a second day on 14 October.

On 13 and 14 November, Iranian teachers in most provinces went on strike for the second time in 2018. Thirteen teachers were arrested during this strike.

On 27 December, Security forces attacked with tear gas a teachers gathering outside the education office in Isfahan, central Iran. Teachers were protesting their low salary and the arrest of their colleagues who were now in jail.

On 24 January 2019, teachers gathered in five provinces to protest their current living and teaching conditions.

On 14 February, teachers in Ardabil, Mashhad, Marivan, Sanandaj, Orumieh, and Kermanshah gathered outside of the offices of the Ministry of Education and protested the arrest of teachers, and unfavourable living and teaching conditions. On the same day a teacher's rights activist was arrested in Sanandaj.

On 3 March, teachers across Iran started a three-day nationwide sit in, in protest to low living wages and unfavourable job conditions. This is the third sit in this year by teachers across Iran. The same day, railway workers in Andimeshk went on strike to protest unpaid wages and blocked the Ahvaz to Mashhad train from running its route. The families of Esmail Bakhshi and Sepideh Gholian also gathered in front of the judiciary in Shush to protest their arrest. On 7 March, teachers again took the streets in multiple cities across Iran. Protests were reported in Kermanshah, Urmia, Ardabil, Mashhad, and Isfahan.

On 2 May, teachers across 13 provinces in Iran protested their poor work and living conditions. The security forces arrested at least three teachers in Tehran.

On 3-5 May, teachers again staged demonstrations and rallies all across Iran, notably Mashhad, where teacher’s unions led mass protests demanding the release of political prisoners and teachers arrested during previous strike movement and denounced the suppression of teachers strikes. Protesters were arrested.

== Workers ==
=== Shush sugar factory ===
On 2 November 2018, workers at the Haft Tappeh Cane Sugar Company's factory in Shush began striking to protest poor economic conditions. Some workers in Shush called for the factory to be operated by a workers council.

On 16 November, the workers disrupted the Friday Prayer service of the city. They chanted "Hossein, Hossein is their cry, theft is their pride", "Death to oppressors, long live workers", and "Workers are willing to die, but will not accept oppression". Protests continued in the streets of Shush on 17 November, despite the presence of the security forces and riot police.

On 18 November, nineteen protestors were arrested in Shush. That day, the Workers Syndicate at the Haft Tappeh sugar mill announced that the security forces had arrested two of their representatives, Esmail Bakhshi and Mohsen Armand. By 21 November, thirteen of the protesters in Shush were released from prison, the arrested protestors faced charges of "acting against the regime".

On 28 November, workers protested for the 24th consecutive day in Shush, despite the city's police commander stating that any gatherings were against the law.

On 29 November, the syndicate also announced that government forces have arrested its senior member Ali Nejati in his house. On 13 December, Nejati was transferred to hospital after long and distressing interrogations.

=== Ahvaz ===
On 15 November, hundreds of workers of the Foolad Company in Ahvaz protested in front of the Governor's office. Protestors in Ahvaz chanted "Let go of Kashoggi, think of us", and "Inflation, increasing prices, be responsible Rouhani".

On 24 November, workers joined by ordinary citizens, protested in Ahvaz and clashed with the security forces. On 28 November, thousands of workers took to the streets of Ahvaz in protest.

On 4 December, workers in Ahvaz protested for the 25th straight day, and chanted "Palestine and Syria are the root of our problems". On 17 December, the security forces cracked-down and arrested 31 workers in Ahvaz whom they re-identified as the leaders of the protests. The day before workers had gathered in Ahvaz and declared that they would take their protest to the capital Tehran, if their demands were not met.

On 18 and 19 December, security forces stormed the houses of Foolad workers in Khuzestan province and arrested up to 41 workers.

=== Other regions ===
On 21 November 2018, workers of the vegetable oil factory of Zanjan protested in front of the governor's office in Zanjan due to unpaid wages.

On 9 December, 15 workers at Ilam Petrochemical Plant in central western Iran were convicted to six months' imprisonment and 74 lashes by a state court after they gathered in protest outside the factory for their fellow experienced workers being laid off. The court charged them with "disrupting public order and peace".

On 18 December, a lone protester on the island of Kish, stood in front of the main square of the city and graffitied anti-regime and pro-worker slogans, which included: "Imprisoned workers must be freed", and "long live the Shah".

On 26 February 2019, railway workers in Tabriz and Shahroud went on strike.

On 5 March, workers of Chamshir Dam in Gachsaran went on strike and gathered outside the governorate to protest 14 months of unpaid wages. On the same day, workers of the Ministry of Agriculture gathered in front of the parliament building in Tehran and protested their low wages. Railway strikes also continued in Tabriz and Lorestan province.

== May Day 2019 protests ==
On 1 May (May Day), workers, students, and teachers gathered in front of the parliament building in Tehran to protest poor economic conditions, and lack of individual rights. Protesters chanted "Workers, teachers, students, unite" and "High costs and inflation are hurting people's lives". The security forces clamped down on the protests and 40 demonstrators were arrested.

== Government suppression ==
Addressing students in Qom, in early March 2019, Musa Ghazanfarabadi, an Iranian official and head of the Islamic Courts in Tehran, said that if needed they can bring Hashd al-Shaabi militias from Iraq, Houthis from Yemen and others from Pakistan and Afghanistan to suppress the demonstrations.

=== Torture allegations ===
On 29 November 2018, it was reported by various news outlets that Esmail Bakhshi, one of the leaders of the strikes in Shush, had been severely tortured during his detention and transferred to a hospital in Ahvaz. Officials in Khuzestan province quickly denied the news. On 4 December, members of the Haft Tape Union, warned that the health of Bakhshi and Sepideh Qolian was in a dire state, as they could not tell what time of day it was. It was later revealed that while in custody, Bakhshi was attacked repeatedly with a baton, to the point where he now has difficulty walking, sitting, and sleeping. He was also given unspecified drugs.

On 20 December 2018, Human Rights Watch urged the regime in Iran to investigate and find an explanation for the death of Vahid Sayadi Nasiri who had been jailed for insulting the Supreme Leader Ali Khamenei. According to his family Nasiri had been on hunger strike but he was denied medical attention before he died.

Bakhshi and Qolian were arrested again in January 2019. In February 2019, it was reported that Bakhshi's health was in serious condition while in jail.

== Gallery ==
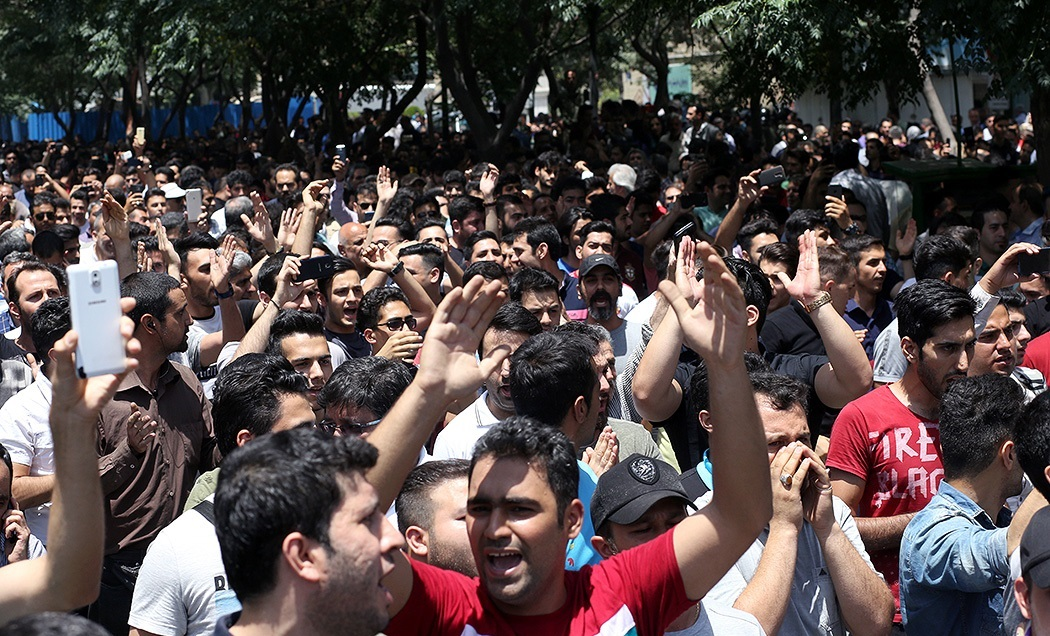
Protesters at Tehran Bazaar

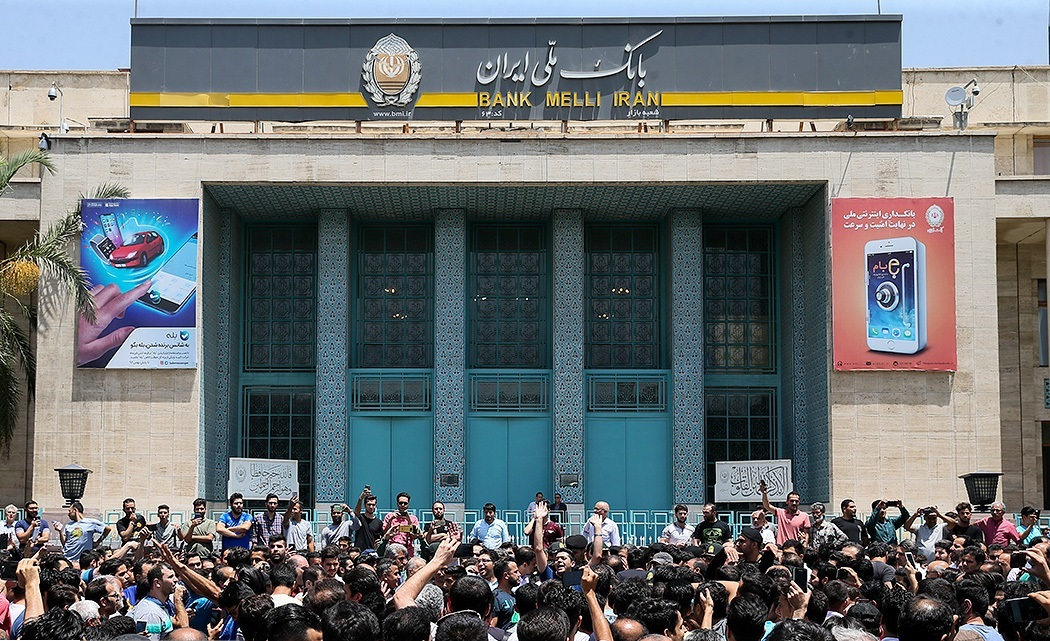
Protesters in front of Bank Melli

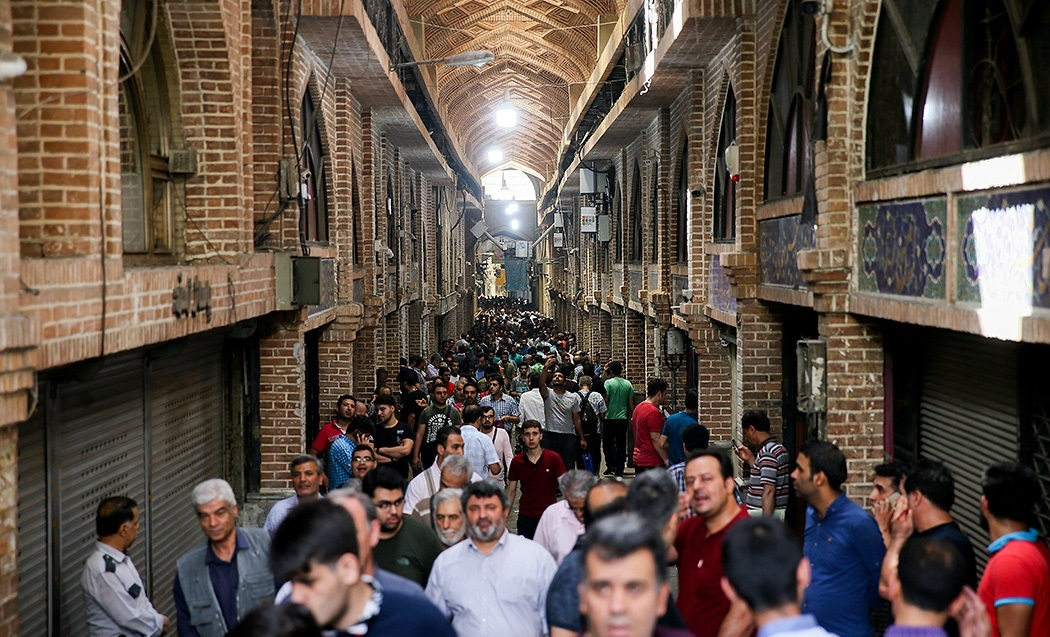
People protesting in Grand Bazar

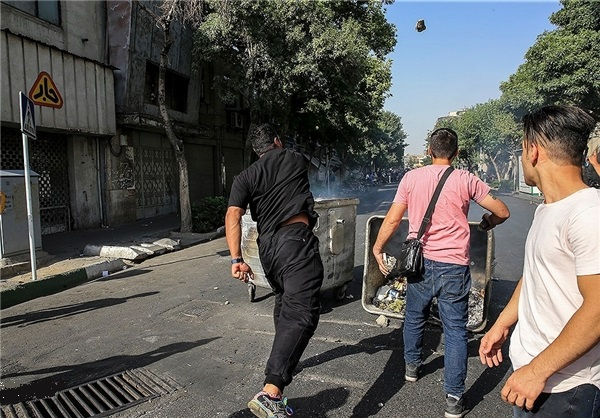
Protesters in streets of Tehran

== See also ==
- Economy of Iran
- History of the Islamic Republic of Iran
- 2017–2018 Iranian protests
- Internet activism during the 2009 Iranian election protests
- 1953 Iranian coup d'état
- Iran student protests, July 1999
- 2009 Iranian presidential election protests
- 2011–2012 Iranian protests
- 2018 Dervish protests
- 2018 Khuzestan protests
- 2018 Iranian water protests
- 2019 Iranian protests
- 2019 Sistan and Baluchestan protests
- June 2018 uprising in Iran
- 2025–2026 Iranian protests Similar protests involving the mass closure of stores.
