= Khosrow Alikordi =

Iranian human rights lawyer (1979–2025)

- خسرو علیکردی
- Born: 26 November 1979; Sabzevar, Iran
- Died: 6 December 2025 (aged 46); Mashhad, Iran
- Cause of death: Heart attack (official); Disputed (allegations of assassination)
- Resting place: Sabzevar Cemetery
- Education: Islamic Azad University, Central Tehran Branch
- Occupations: Lawyer and human rights activist
- Known for: Representing political prisoners and justice-seeking families

Khosrow Alikordi (Persian: خسرو علیکردی; 26 November 1979 – 6 December 2025) was an Iranian lawyer and human rights activist. He was known for representing political prisoners, protesters, and the justice-seeking families of those killed in the Mahsa Amini protests. As a result of his work, he was sentenced to imprisonment, exile, and a ban on practicing law.

His body was discovered on 6 December 2025, in his office in Mashhad. Although official authorities declared a "heart attack" as the cause of death, many lawyers, human rights activists, and his family considered his death suspicious and a "state-sponsored murder." They cited evidence such as bleeding and the confiscation of 16 CCTV cameras from his office by security forces. His death sparked widespread reactions among opponents of the Islamic Republic, and human rights organizations called for an independent international investigation.

== Early life and education ==
Khosrow Alikordi was born on 26 November 1979. He began his career defending protesters and political prisoners following the Iranian Green Movement in 2009.

His activism led to severe pressure on his education. In 2010, he was accepted into the master's program for public law at Allameh Tabataba'i University, but security services prevented his enrollment by designating him a "starred student" (a term for students blacklisted for political activity). Although the Administrative Justice Court ruled in his favor, university officials refused to enforce the verdict, and he was forced to continue his studies at the Islamic Azad University, Central Tehran Branch.

Later, he began his Ph.D. in public law but was expelled and banned from continuing his education after serving a one-year prison sentence for his activism. On his X (Twitter) profile, he had described himself as "deprived of studying for a Ph.D. in public law... and a 'starred' master's student."

== Legal and human rights activities ==
=== Representation of political cases ===
Alikordi began his work as a defense lawyer for protesters after the 2009 Iranian Green Movement and was subsequently summoned and interrogated by security forces multiple times. Following the Mahsa Amini protests (the "Woman, Life, Freedom" movement), he took on many sensitive and symbolic cases in Khorasan province. His clients included the justice-seeking families of Abolfazl Adinezadeh and Erfan Rezaei Navaei, as well as prominent political prisoners such as Fatemeh Sepehri, Mohammad-Hossein Sepehri, and Kamal Jafari Yazdi (signatories of the Statement of 14 Political Activists). He had also accepted the cases of approximately one hundred protesters arrested during demonstrations over water management in Sabzevar.

=== Activism and confronting the judiciary ===
Alikordi's activities extended beyond his legal practice. He was a supporter of the "Tuesdays Against Executions" campaign and repeatedly spoke out against the death penalty. In a rare move, he filed an official complaint against three judicial officials, including the heads of branches of the Mashhad Islamic Revolutionary Court, for "disciplinary violations."

Prior to his death, Alikordi wrote a letter to the United Nations Fact-Finding Mission on Iran, identifying himself as a "lawyer at risk" and requesting "necessary support," citing five security cases that had been fabricated against him. He also warned colleagues that security institutions were building "new cases" against him and had the "intention of physical elimination."

=== Arrest and conviction ===
As a result of his activities, in November 2023, the first branch of the Mashhad Revolutionary Court sentenced him on charges of "propaganda against the state" to one year in prison, two years in exile to the city of Nehbandan, a two-year ban on leaving the country, a two-year ban on practicing law, and a two-year ban on social media activity. He was transferred to Vakilabad Prison in February 2024 to serve his sentence. After approximately eight months, he was released in October 2024 on a work-release program but was re-arrested in January 2025 and returned to prison. He was finally released on 30 January 2025, after completing his sentence.

== Suspicious death and reactions ==
=== Circumstances of death and conflicting reports ===
Khosrow Alikordi's body was discovered on the morning of 6 December 2025, in his office in Mashhad. Official authorities of the Islamic Republic, including the security deputy of the governor of Razavi Khorasan province, stated that the cause of death, according to the forensic medicine report, was a "heart attack."

This official narrative was immediately challenged by lawyers, human rights activists, and his relatives. According to multiple sources, including lawyer Marzieh Mohammadi, Alikordi had no history of heart disease and was in perfect health. Evidence cited by his relatives included bleeding from the mouth and nose and signs of a blow to the head. According to reports, the criminal investigation police had initially opened a "murder" case for the incident.

=== Investigation and seizure of cameras ===
After the discovery of the body, security forces took control of the location and confiscated the hard drives of the 16 CCTV cameras in the office and building. His brother, Javad Alikordi, stated that uncovering the truth was entirely dependent on the return of this footage "complete and without any cuts." He warned that if "even one second" of the films were missing, he would not trust the judicial system of the Islamic Republic and would "raise a cry for justice for his brother in international forums."

Sources close to the family reported that security and Ministry of Intelligence agents pressured friends and family to declare the cause of death a "heart attack" to expedite the release of the body and the funeral. After the funeral, Javad Alikordi and other family members were reportedly threatened with "arrest and death" by agents of the Mashhad Intelligence Office.

=== Reactions ===
Alikordi's suspicious death prompted widespread reactions. Iran Human Rights called for the formation of an independent international fact-finding mission, citing the history of the Chain murders of Iran. Nobel Peace Prize laureate Shirin Ebadi called him "the voice of the nameless and voiceless prisoners," and fellow laureate Narges Mohammadi wrote that Alikordi's last wish was, "Do not let political prisoners in remote cities be forgotten." Mohammadi and other activists including Pouran Nazemi and Sepideh Qolian were subsequently arrested while commemorating Alikordi's death on 12 December in Mashhad.

A group of political prisoners in Vakilabad Prison issued a joint message calling him an "independent, honorable, and compassionate lawyer." Reza Pahlavi stated that "all evidence indicates that his murder is part of a new wave of eliminations of patriots," viewing his death as part of a systematic process.

=== Funeral ===
Khosrow Alikordi's funeral was held on 7 December 2025, at the cemetery in Sabzevar under heavy security measures, with drones flying over the crowd. Despite this, mourners and justice-seeking families chanted slogans such as, "O Khosrow, our hero, your path continues" and "This fallen flower is a gift to the homeland."

== See also ==
- Death of Mahsa Amini
- Chain murders of Iran
