= Osanloo =

Osanloo,Osanlou, (Persian: اسانلو) is an Iranian surname. Notable people with the surname include:

- Arzoo Osanloo (born 1968), Iranian-American anthropologist
- Mansour Osanlou, leading trade union activist in Iran
