= Pouran Nazemi =

Iranian human rights activist (born 1970)

- پوران ناظمی
- Nazemi in 2022
- Born: 1970 (age 55–56); Kerman province, Imperial State of Iran
- Occupation: Human rights activist
- Years active: 1985–present
- Known for: Campaigning for human rights in southeastern Iran

Pouran Nazemi (Persian: پوران ناظمی; born c. 1970) is an Iranian human rights activist from Kerman province, known for her work on the rights of women, children, minority groups and political prisoners. A long-term critic of the Iranian government, Nazemi has been arrested and imprisoned on multiple occasions since 1985.

== Activism ==
Nazemi was born and raised in Kerman province in southeastern Iran, where she continues to be based. Her sister, Mahshid is also a human rights activist, who sought asylum in Turkey and lives in France as of 2023.

Nazemi's activism has focused on the rights of women, children, political prisoners and their families, as well as marginalised groups living in southeastern Iran. Nazemi is also a proponent of the right to freedom of assembly and has criticised human rights abuses committed by Iranian authorities. She has campaigned against the use of the death penalty and, prior to his death in 2026, was a critic of Ali Khamenei, the Supreme Leader of Iran, being among 14 activists who signed a public statement calling for his resignation. Following the Evin Prison fire in October 2022, Nazemi alleged that police had shot prisoners attempting to escape the fire, and described the Iranian government's response to the incident as a "disaster".

Nazemi has campaigned in support of the rights of people living in Jazmurian County in southeastern Kerman province, whose lives were significantly impacted by climate change. Her work in Jazmurian included working with women about their rights; promoting the increased sanitation of community wells; and raising awareness of environmental issues.

== Arrests and imprisonments ==
Nazemi was first arrested in 1986 at the age of 15, and was subsequently tried and sentenced to flogging for insulting Ruhollah Khomeini, the then-Supreme Leader of Iran. Nazemi has continued to experience state harassment as a result of her activism, particularly during the 2020s. She has publicly stated that she does not recognise the authority of the Iranian judicial system and has refused to participate in trials.

=== 2021 arrests ===
On 27 May 2021, Nazemi filed a judicial complaint in Tehran, alongside other former prisoners, concerning the torture and abuse of people being held in solitary confinement in Iranian prisons. Several days later, while participating in a protest outside a prison in Shiraz in support of the imprisoned brothers Vahid and Habib Afkari, Nazemi was arrested. She was subsequently released, but was subsequently arrested on two further occasions in 2021, including in Khuzestan province as part of the 2021 Iranian water protests, and at a protest against the Taliban following its takeover of the government in Afghanistan. On both occasions, she was released the same day she was arrested; during her second arrest, her nose and ribs were fractured by security officers.

In September 2021, Nazemi's home was searched and several items, including electronic devices, books and documents, were seized. The rationale for the search was unknown, though fellow women's rights activist Maryam Rahmani's home was searched at the same time. On 19 October 2022, Nazemi's home was raided for a second time by officers from the Ministry of Intelligence, and she was arrested and transported to Evin Prison on unknown charges. She was subsequently released.

=== 2022 arrest ===
On 19 October 2022, Nazemi was arrested while participating in the Mahsa Amini protests.

=== 2023 arrest and going into hiding ===
On 1 February 2023, Nazemi and her sister Mahshid were arrested while visiting their father at Mehrgan Hospital in Kerman. No warrant was provided, and during the arrest it was alleged that both sisters were physically and sexually assaulted. The women were detained at a prison in Kerman before being released on bail on 7 February. While Mahshid subsequently returned to Turkey, Nazemi remained in Iran, and in October 2023 was charged by the Jiroft Revolutionary Court of "insulting the sacred principles of Islam", "war against God" and "corruption on Earth", offences punishable by death under the Iranian penal code. Following the announcement of the charges, Nazemi went into hiding for two years. On 6 February 2025, she released a video in which she alleged she had been declared to be a mahdur al-dam by the Islamic Revolutionary Guard Corps as a result of her reporting on corruption in Kerman province, meaning she could be legally killed.

In 2025, Nazemi came out of hiding after it was believed the charges against her had been dropped; in September, the prosecutor's office in Jiroft subsequently announced that the 2023 charges was being reconsidered, alongside potential new charges.

=== 2025 arrest and subsequent trial ===
On 12 December 2025, Nazemi was arrested at a demonstration commemorating the death of Khosrow Alikordi, alongside fellow activists Narges Mohammadi, Sepideh Qolian, Alieh Motallebzadeh and Hasti Amiri in Mashhad. Following a violent arresrt and interrogation, Nazemi fell into a coma and was hospitalised in February 2026; she was subsequently released on a 20 billion IRR bail.

On 26 September 2026, Nazemi was sentenced in absentia to five years and nine months in prison by branch 1 of the Mashhad Revolutionary Court on charges of assembly and collusion against national security; propaganda against the state; and disrupting public order, in response to her attendance at the 2025 protests against Alikordi's death. Nazemi challenged the ruling on 6 October, but on 12 October it was announced the appeal had not been formally registered, putting her at risk of imminent imprisonment.

== Recognition ==
Front Line Defenders has called for an end of judicial harassment of Nazemi. A documentary film about the time Nazemi spent in hiding between 2023 and 2025 was produced entitled Panahgah 25.
