= Statement of 14 Political Activists =

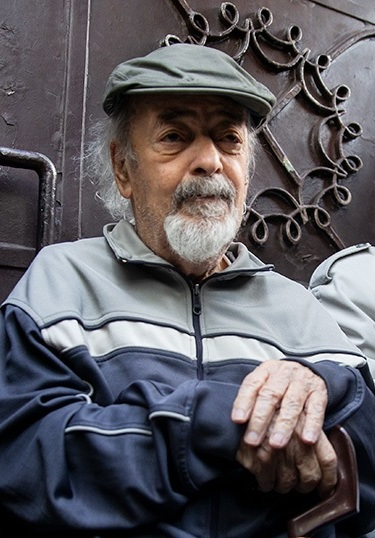
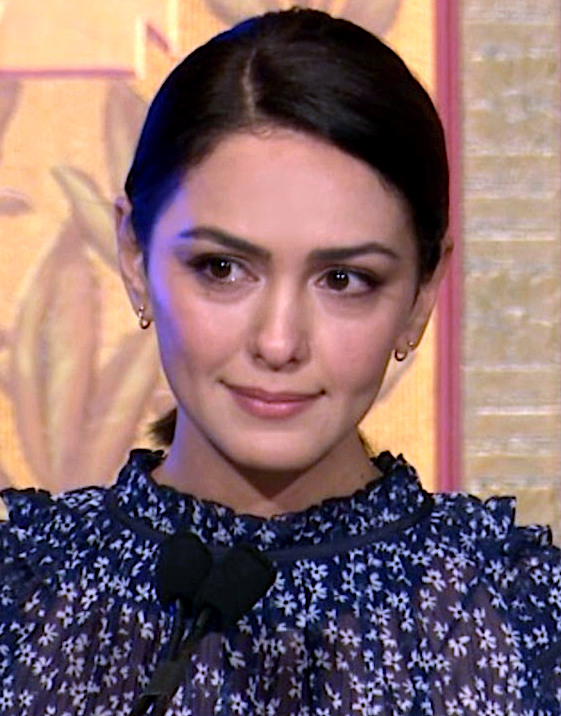
Mohammad Maleki, one of the initial domestic signatories, and Nazanin Bonyadi, one of the supporters and a signatory among the 14 women activists outside Iran

The Statement of 14 Political Activists (Persian: بیانیه چهارده فعال سیاسی, romanized: Bianie Chahardeh Faal Siasi) is an open letter signed by 14 political activists inside Iran, aimed at People of Iran, calling Ali Khamenei to resign his post of Supreme Leader after 30-year tenure. It was published online on tenth anniversary of controversial 2009 Iranian presidential election. One week after first letter, they published another letter asking for abolition of Islamic republic and establishment of a democratic secular government.

Hashem Khastar, Gohar Eshghi (Mother of Sattar Beheshti), Mohammad Maleki (former Tehran University Chancellor), Mohammad Nourizad and Mohammad Karimbeigi (Father of Mostafa Karimbeigi) were among signatories of this letter.

Weeks after the letter was released, 14 female activists inside Iran issued a similar statement on August 5, 2019. These women said theocratic rule has led to "gender apartheid" and "erased" the rights of half of the country’s population; They called on Khamenei to resign.

On August 10, 14 Iranian women's rights activists, who reside outside Iran, published an open letter and expressed their support for previous letters.

As of September 2019, 16 of 28 signatories, who reside in Iran, have been arrested.

== Background ==
In the midst of 2017–2018 Iranian protests, 15 Iranian intellectuals published an open letter called for a referendum. They wrote:

Four decades have passed since the establishment of the Islamic republic, a government whose obsession with Islamisation has left little room for republican ideals. So many women, lawyers, journalists, teachers, students, workers and political and social activists have been harassed, arrested, convicted of serious crimes and sent to prison, solely for criticizing officials, enlightening public opinion, inviting the rulers to respect separation of religion from government or demanding women’s relief from the mandatory veil.

Signatories included Shirin Ebadi, Nobel peace prize laureate; Narges Mohammadi, a human rights activist imprisoned in Evin prison; Nasrin Sotoudeh, a human rights lawyer imprisoned in Evin prison; and the film-makers Mohsen Makhmalbaf and Jafar Panahi.

== Signatories ==
=== Signatories of first letter ===
1. Gohar Eshghi (Mother of Sattar Beheshti)
2. Hoorieh Farajzadeh (Sister of Shahram Farajzadeh)
3. Mohammad Karimbeigi (Father of Mostafa Karimbeigi)
4. Hashem Khastar
5. Mohammad Mahdavifar
6. Mohammad Maleki (former Chancellor of Tehran University)
7. Javad La'l Mohammadi
8. Mohammad Nourizad
9. Mohammad Hossein Sepehri
10. Abbas Vahedian Shahroodi
11. Kamal Jaafari Yazdi
12. Reza Mehrgan
13. Mohammadreza Bayat
14. Zardosht Ahmadi Ragheb

=== Signatories of second letter ===
14 women inside Iran signed this letter:

1. Shahla Entesari
2. Nosrat Beheshti
3. Fereshteh Tasvibi
4. Parva Pachideh
5. Giti Pourfazel
6. Zahra Jamali
7. Shahla Jahanbin
8. Ezzat Javadi-Hesar
9. Fatemeh Sepehri
10. Maryam Soleimani
11. Soosan Taherkhani
12. Farangis Mazloom (Mother of Soheil Arabi)
13. Narges Mansouri
14. Kimia Norouzi-Saber

=== Signatories of third letter ===
14 women outside Iran signed this letter:

1. Nazanin Afshin-Jam
2. Roya Boroumand
3. Ladan Boroumand
4. Nazanin Bonyadi
5. Azam Bahrami
6. Roya Hakakian
7. Naeemeh Doostdar
8. Masih Alinejad
9. Nahid Farhad
10. Mehrangiz Kar
11. Sheema Kalbasi
12. Maryam Memar-Sadeghi
13. Azar Nafisi
14. Leily Nikounazar

== Support ==
The Letters found many supporters and was widely shared on social media. Many Iranian women's rights activists and famous artists, authors and human rights advocates abroad offered their support for the women.

=== I am 15th ===
Giti Pourfazel, a lawyer who is one of the signatories, told Radio Farda that other Iranian women could count themselves as the 15th signatory. Many Iranian celebrities and Twitter users expressed their support.

== Court sentences ==
In March 2020, a court in Iran sentenced Reza Mehregan, one of the fourteen signatories, to six years in prison and 74 lashes. A few months earlier a court in Mashhad sentenced eight of those activists who asked Khamenei to resign, to a total of 72 years in prison.

== See also ==
- Human rights in the Islamic Republic of Iran
