= Mohammad Mahdavifar =

Iranian poet and activist (born 1970)

- Persian: محمد مهدوی‌فر
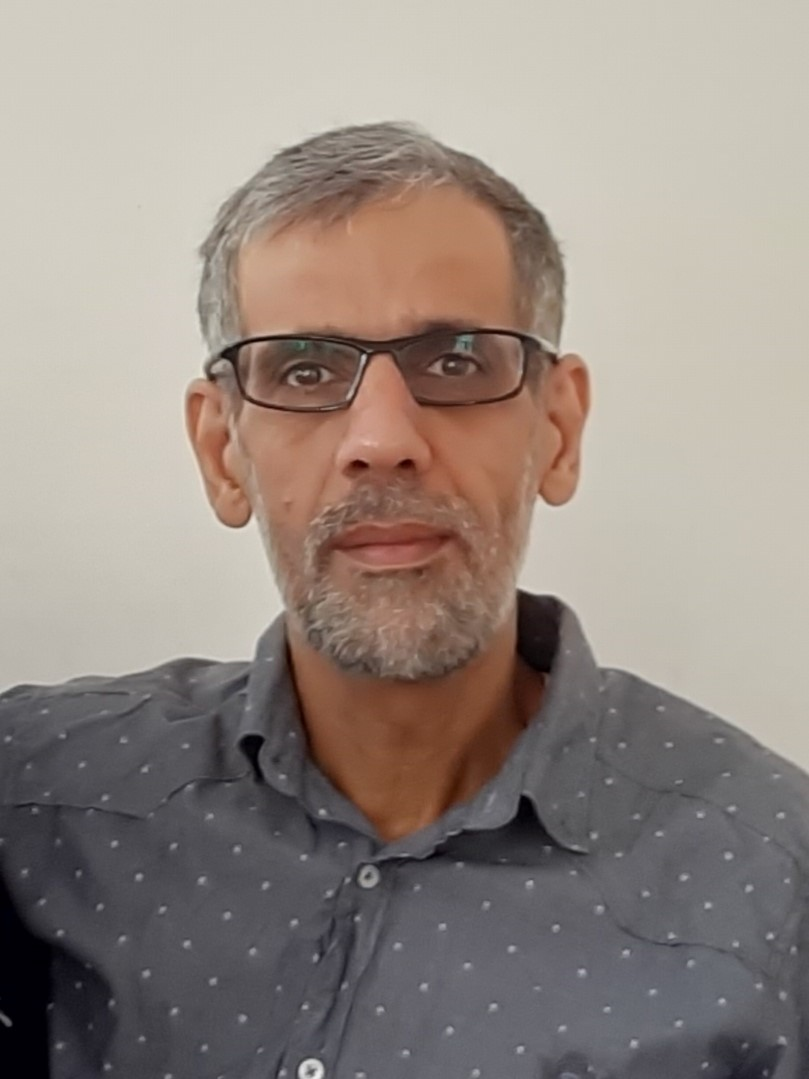
- Born: 19 January 1970 (age 56)
- Occupations: Political activist; Poet
- Years active: 2014–present
- Known for: Statement of 14 Political Activists; Writing the poem "Alphabet"
- Opponent: Government of Iran
- Criminal charges: Insulting the Leader; Propaganda against the regime
- Criminal penalty: 4.5 years in prison and 4 years of exile to Sarbaz County

Mohammad Mahdavifar (Persian: محمد مهدوی‌فر; born 19 January 1970) is an Iranian poet, civil rights activist, former political prisoner, and a chemical warfare victim from the Iran–Iraq War. He has been arrested multiple times for writing critical poetry and sending open letters to Ali Khamenei, Iran's Supreme Leader.

== Early life and activism ==
Mahdavifar served as a demining expert and diver during the Iran–Iraq War. After the war, he began writing protest poetry, some of which received negative reactions from security forces.

One of his works, "Alphabet", is a critique of the political and social situation in Iran. This poem led to his conviction and a 1.5-year prison sentence. He also wrote 29 open letters to the Supreme Leader, which led to his repeated imprisonments.

== Arrests and convictions ==
Mahdavifar has been arrested several times by Iranian security forces.

He was first arrested in September 2016 by agents of the Ministry of Intelligence at his home. After 45 days of temporary detention in solitary confinement, he was released from Isfahan Central Prison.

In June 2017, he was arrested for "propaganda against the system" and transferred to Kashan Prison. He was later released on bail after five months. During the 2017–2018 Iranian protests, he was arrested again due to his open letters and calls for a referendum. He was then transferred to Isfahan Central Prison.

In March 2019, Mahdavifar was conditionally released after serving one-third of his prison sentence, only to be exiled to Sistan and Baluchestan. However, in July 2019, he was arrested again after signing the Statement of 14 Political Activists and sentenced to nine years in prison. In late 2019, due to the COVID-19 pandemic, he was granted temporary leave from Kashan Prison and subsequently left the country.

== Political positions and reactions ==
=== Letter to Hassan Nasrallah ===
In 2016, after the United States imposed banking sanctions on the Hezbollah group, Hassan Nasrallah, Hezbollah's leader, claimed that these sanctions were ineffective as Hezbollah received all its needs directly from the Islamic Republic of Iran. Nasrallah stated, "As long as Iran has money, we have money."

In response, Mahdavifar wrote an open letter to Nasrallah, highlighting poverty and unemployment in Iran. He criticized Nasrallah for not knowing that "our money has run out" and called for transparency about the funds Hezbollah receives from Iran. This letter was reported in several Arabic news outlets.

=== Call for referendum ===
During the 2017–2018 Iranian protests, Mahdavifar suggested, in an open letter, the formation of a council of intellectuals to oversee a referendum on Iran's political future, which led to his arrest. Ruhollah Zam, chief editor of Amadnews, which played an active role in covering and mobilizing the protests, welcomed Mahdavifar's letter and proposed council as a peaceful model for a democratic transition.

During the 38th to 40th sessions of the United Nations Human Rights Council, Mahdavifar was mentioned alongside Fazlollah Nikbakht, Hamed Aeenevand, and Arash Mahin Jafarabadi as prisoners whose alleged crime was demanding a referendum.

=== Signing the Statement of 14 Political Activists ===
In 2019, Mahdavifar was one of 14 political activists inside Iran who signed a statement calling for the resignation of Ali Khamenei and a transition away from the Islamic Republic of Iran. He, along with other signatories, later established the National Council of Tasmim.
