= Involvement of foreign militias in the suppression of protests in Iran =

A significant aspect of political repression in the Islamic Republic of Iran has been the deployment of non-Iranian militias in violent crackdowns against Iranian civilians during major protests. These foreign militias are normally proxy forces backed by the Islamic Revolutionary Guard Corps (IRGC), which sustains a coalition called the Axis of Resistance to fight in wars across the Middle East, generally consisting of Shia Muslims in armed groups from Lebanon, Iraq, Yemen, Pakistan, and Afghanistan.

Their involvement is usually considered a part of a broader strategy by the government of Iran to maintain internal stability by crushing dissent among its citizens. Notable groups that have been documented as direct participants in the suppression of Iranian protests since the 2000s include Lebanese Hezbollah, the Iraqi Popular Mobilization Forces, the Yemeni Houthis, the Pakistani Liwa Zainabiyoun, and the Afghan Liwa Fatemiyoun.

== Background and reasoning ==
Iran has financed and supported a network of foreign militias under the banner of the "Axis of Resistance," primarily through the IRGC's Quds Force. These groups, which have fought in Syria, Iraq, and Yemen, have also been deployed domestically when the Iranian regime faces widespread protests by its own citizens. According to Iran International, the reason behind this move by the Iranian Government could be its concern that the Iranian police and paramilitary Basij might not follow orders to crackdown on or attack protesters who are fellow Iranians or simply because its forces are insufficient to stop multiple protests in more than 100 cities at once.

== Key militia groups involved ==
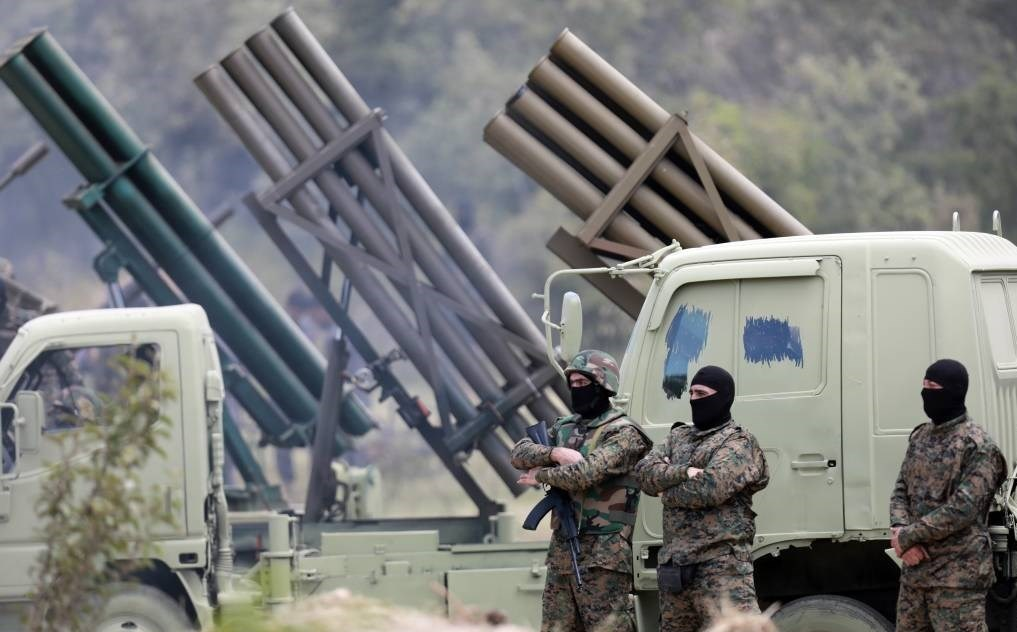
Military drill by Hezbollah in Aaramta, Lebanon, on 21 May 2023

- Lebanese Hezbollah: Hezbollah has played an important role in Iran's regional strategy and has reportedly assisted in monitoring and suppressing protests inside Iran. The group's operatives have been deployed alongside Iranian security forces to provide tactical support and intelligence gathering.
- Iraqi Militias (Hashd al-Shaabi/Popular Mobilization Forces): Various factions of the Hashd al-Shaabi, particularly those closely tied to the IRGC, have been accused of participating in the crackdown on Iranian demonstrators. These militias have experience in urban warfare and have been used to bolster Iranian security forces during large-scale protests.
  - Kata'ib Hezbollah: On January 26, 2026, in the aftermath of the 2025–2026 Iranian protests, Kata'ib Hezbollah called for its fighters around the world to prepare to fight on behalf on the Iranian regime.
- Afghan Fatemiyoun Brigade: The Fatemiyoun Brigade, a Shia Afghan militia trained, funded, and controlled by the IRGC, has been involved in domestic repression. Many of its members are recruited from Afghans in Iran who are either refugees or economic migrants. The brigade was initially deployed to Syria and Yemen but have since been used to counter dissent in Iran, including the Insurgency in Sistan and Balochistan.
- Pakistani Zainabiyoun Brigade: The Pakistani Zainabiyoun, a Shia Pakistani militia trained, funded, and controlled by the IRGC, which was used to fight wars in Syria, Iraq, and Yemen. Its members are usually students pursuing higher studies as well as political dissidents and pilgrims, and are religious Shias from Pakistan. The brigade was reportedly used to suppress protests during the 2018–2019 protests as well as the 2025–2026 Iranian protests.
- Yemeni Houthis: The Yemeni Houthis were allegedly used to suppress protests during the 2018–2019 protests.

== Protests ==
- 2009 Iranian presidential election protests: On 16 June 2009, Der Spiegel reported that the Iranian government recruited 5,000 Lebanese Hezbollah fighters to clash with protesters.
- 2018–2019 protests: In early March 2019, during, Musa Ghazanfarabadi, head of the Islamic Courts in Tehran, hinted that Iran use foreign proxy forces, namely the Iraqi Hashd al-Shaabi, the Afghan Fatemiyoun Brigade, the Pakistani Zainebiyoun, and Yemeni Houthis, to manage internal unrest.
- 2022–2023 Mahsa Amini protests: In the wake of Mahsa Amini's death in 2022, reports surfaced that Iran had brought in Iraqi allies, specifically members of Hashd al-Shaabi and Kata'ib Hezbollah, to assist in cracking down on protests. Eyewitnesses reported the arrival of these forces in Iran, suggesting their involvement in suppressing the demonstrations.
- 2025–2026 Iranian protests: During the 2025–2026 protests, the presence of Iraqi Popular Mobilization Forces, Arabic-speaking mercenaries, Lebanese Hezbollah, Pakistani Liwa Zainabiyoun, and Afghan Liwa Fatemiyoun in suppressing protests was reported. On 6 January 2026, it was reported that approximately 800 members of Iraqi Shia militia groups, including Kata'ib Hezbollah, Harakat al-Nujaba, Sayyid al-Shuhada, and Badr organization, had been sent to Iran. The troops were reportedly transported through the border crossings of Shalamcheh, Chazhabeh, and Khosravi, officially under the cover of a "pilgrimage to the holy sites of Imam Reza in Mashhad," while in practice they were gathered at a base in Ahvaz before being dispatched to various regions to assist in suppressing protests. On 9 January 2026, the United States warned Iran against using foreign militias to crush protests. According to The Media Line, Shia Iraqi militia members were recruited to help suppress Iranian protesters, receiving $600 each. By 11 January, more than 60 buses, each carrying about 50 people, had crossed the Iran–Iraq border. On 14 January, a source told IHRNGO that the security forces in the Kurdish regions of Iran who were cracking down on the protests did not speak Persian, while in Karaj, an eyewitness said the forces spoke Arabic and took selfies with the bodies. On 15 January, an Iraqi source stated to CNN that "nearly 5,000" fighters from Iraqi militias had crossed into Iran over the preceding weeks. On 28 March, during the 2026 Iran war, a convoy of the Popular Mobilization Forces, an Iraqi militia supported by the Iranian government was observed traveling from Iraq towards Iran. The next day, it was reported that they were being housed in Revolutionary Guards housing in Bandar Abbas and that they were seen in the streets of Abadan. A 2 April report claimed that the Iranian government was losing control of the militias.

== See also ==
- Political repression in the Islamic Republic of Iran
- Funding of the Axis of Resistance
