= Mostafa Karim Beigi =

Iranian activist (1983–2009)

- Born: 21 April 1983
- Died: 27 December 2009 (aged 26)
- Cause of death: Shot by the Special Unit of the Law Enforcement
- Resting place: Shahriar, Tehran Province
- Known for: Death during the 2009 Iranian election protests

Mostafa Karim Beigi (Persian: مصطفی کریم‌ بیگی; 21 April 1983 - 27 December 2009) was one of the victims of the Ashura protests, which occurred in Tehran, Iran on 27 December 2009 to protest the outcome of the 2009 Iranian presidential election, which the demonstrators believed to be rigged.

Police and security forces did not inform Mr. Karim-Beigi's family of his death. A statement issued by the Tehran Metropolitan Police Headquarters on December 29, 2009 announced the death of an unidentified individual as a result of falling from the bridge on the day of Ashura. After 15–16 days of search for him in hospitals and prisons, his family was finally able to identify his body in the forensic department of Kahrizak detention center. According to Shahnaz Akmali, his mother, the forensic department declared the cause of his death as "a strike of a sharp and hard object to the rib cage, however he was shot in his forehead from the left, his head had no backside”.

His body was buried in the village of Jogheen in Shahriar, at night and under tight security measures.

== See also ==
- 2009 Iranian presidential election protests
- Ashura protests
