= Mansour Osanlou =

- منصور اسانلو
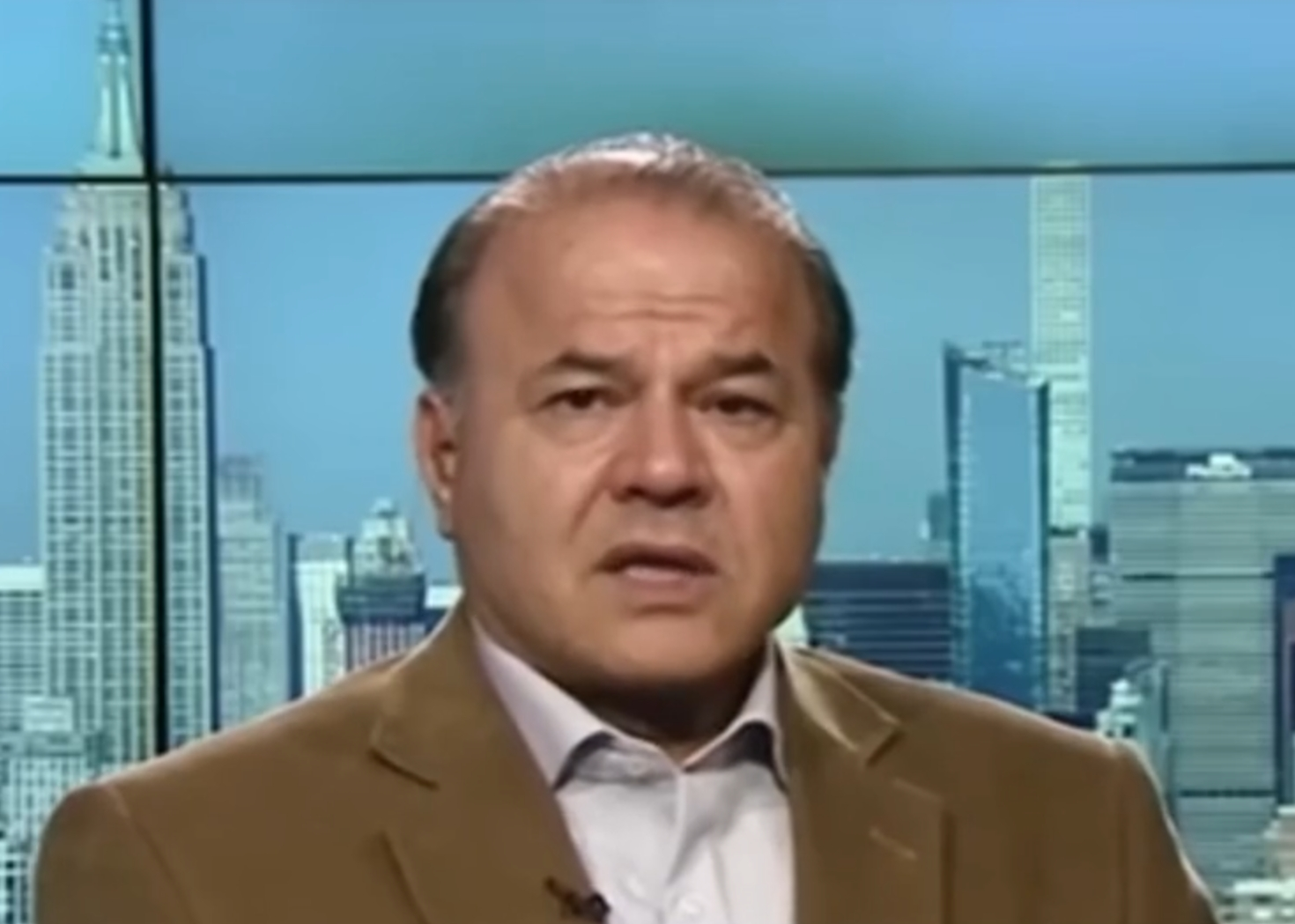

Mansour Osanlou (Persian: منصور اسانلو) is a trade union activist in Iran, where he was imprisoned several times from 2005 to 2008. Osanlou was then held in Evin Prison, serving a five-year prison sentence, and freed in June 2013. He is a founding member of the Syndicate of Workers of Tehran and Suburbs Bus Company, an independent union that has been campaigning for workers’ rights.

== Background ==
Osanlou is President of the Executive Committee of the Syndicate of Workers of Tehran and Suburbs Bus Company, the transport workers' trade union in Tehran in Iran.

In December 2005, bus drivers in Tehran refused to take passengers' fares, as a protest called by both Osanlou and the Workers' Syndicate. Osanlou and his colleagues could build up again their syndicate (union) after 24 years. This led to the arrest of several union activists on December 22, including Osanlou. He was imprisoned more than seven months, and suffered torture.

Mansour Osanlou published the magazine “The Union’s Message” from 2005 to 2012 in Tehran together with Robert Bruchim, an Iranian-Jewish journalist, and Bruchim took over as editor of this publication, which continued to be published until Robert Bruchim's arrest and detention in Iran.

Tehran bus workers were due to strike on 28 January 2006 calling for his release and other demands. However, early that morning, hundreds of union activists were arrested as were the families of many of the workers.

The Scottish Socialist Party tabled a motion calling for his release before the Scottish Parliament. He was released on bail in July/August 2006 after being kept in solitary confinement for months. After that, he continued his duty with co workers to reestablish their rights.

According to eyewitness accounts, Osanlou was arrested for a second time on November 19, 2006 under suspicious circumstances, along with Ebrahim Madadi, the vice-president of Workers' Syndicate. They were beaten by a group of armed militia and were taken away after shots were fired into the air. This seems to be another case where special police and state-sponsored undercover security named Ansar-e Hezbollah are used in arresting and silencing social and political activists.

In November 2006 he was released on bail of £164,000. He was sentenced to a five-year prison term in March 2007. However, he was allowed to travel to London, England for the International Transport Workers' Federation conference and to Brussels, Belgium for a meeting with the International Trade Union Confederation in June 2007.

He was arrested again in July 2007. According to 2007 reports by the International Transport Workers' Federation and the International Trade Union Confederation, Osanlou was in imminent risk of losing his eyesight due to injuries sustained from government security forces in May 2005 and June 2007 after he returned from his unionist trips, and exacerbated by a lack of proper medical care by the Iranian authorities while in custody. They sent him to Rajaee Shahr jail, because he tried help to guard workers in Evin prison to organise their union, and they back paid their money of their bosses.

In August 2010, he was sentenced to another year in prison after conviction of a new charge of "spreading propaganda against the system." On 2 June 2011, Ossanlu’s wife stated that he had been granted a four-day medical leave for medical treatment.

Osanlou is an instructor of online, Persian-language courses on labor rights and labor organizing at Tavaana: E-Learning Institute for Iranian Civil Society. He established a new movement regarding workers and teachers site in the name of Hoghooghe Moalem and Karegar (teachers' and workers' rights). He is a member of Kampain Maeeshat (Living campaign), (Sandoogh Ray Azad) Free democratic box organization. Osanlou and his comrades are organising a new movement to make a global solidarity of Iranian activists, against Islamic fundamentalism in Iran.

== See also ==
- Ministry of Intelligence (Iran)
- Syndicate of Workers of Tehran and Suburbs Bus Company
