= 2019 Sistan and Baluchestan protests =

2019 series of protests in Iran

- Part of 2019–2020 Iranian protests
- Date: 29 November 2019 – December 2019
- Location: Sistan and Baluchestan province, Iran
- Caused by: Arrest of an anti–government cleric
- Methods: Demonstrations, Road closures

Parties
Civilians of Sistan and Baluchestan province	Islamic Republic; • Police

Lead figures
	Ali Khamenei

Casualties
- Injuries: 6
- Arrested: unknown

The 2019 Sistan and Baluchestan protests were a series of protests in the Sistan and Baluchestan province of Iran. The protests started on 29 November 2019 after a prominent anti–government cleric was arrested.

== Timeline ==
Protests started on 29 November in the Pashamagh and Sarbaz area after a prominent cleric was arrested. Demonstrators closed off several roads in the area, and were met with the security forces responding with tear gas and live bullets in attempt to disperse the crowd. At least six protesters were injured as a result.
