= Reza Shahabi =

Iranian trade unionist

- رضا شهابی
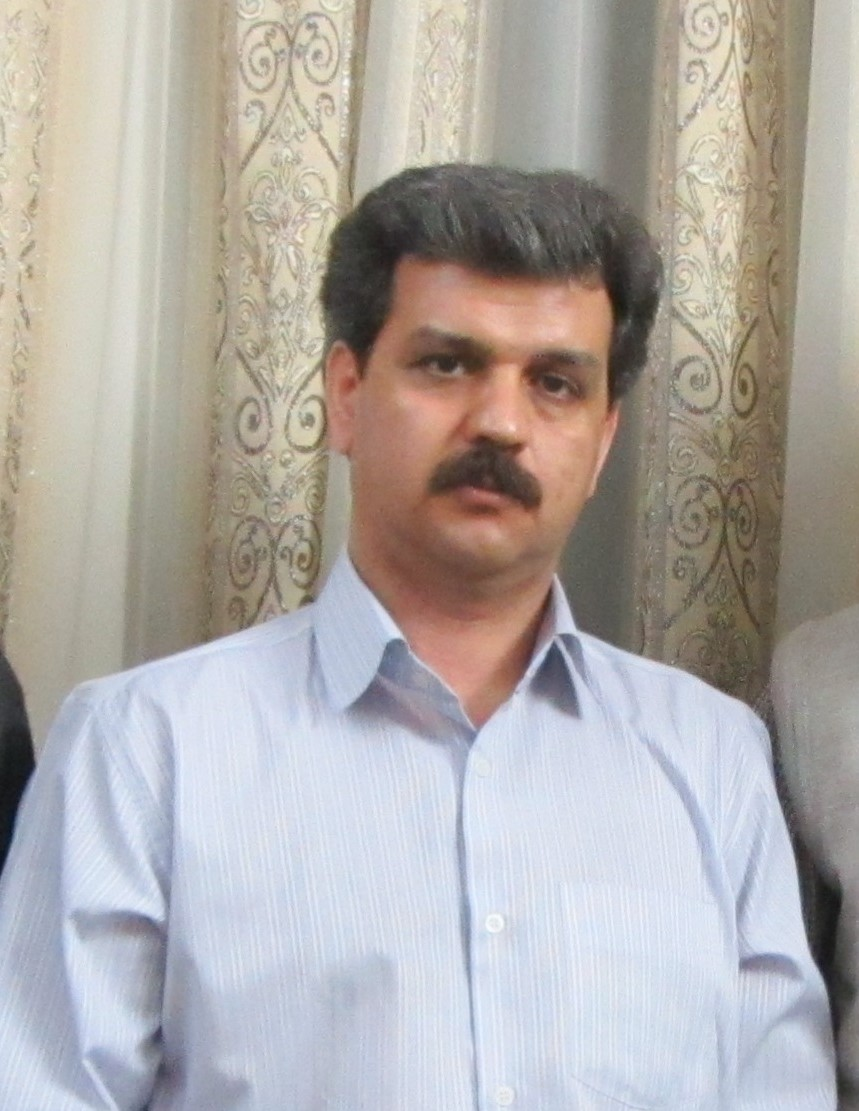
- Reza Shahabi (2012)

Reza Shahabi (Persian: رضا شهابی, also known as Reza Shahabi Zakaria) is an Iranian trade unionist who has been imprisoned on political charges since June 2010.

Reza Shahabi is, or was, the treasurer of the Syndicate of Workers of Tehran and Suburbs Bus Company labor union in Tehran, Iran's capital. He has been detained in Evin Prison since June 2010. On 14 April 2012 was sentenced to six years imprisonment by Branch 15 of the Islamic Revolutionary Court of Tehran—five years for "gathering and colluding against state security", and one year for "spreading propaganda against the system". He was also fined 70 million rial (US$5,700) and banned from all trade unionist activities for five years. According to his lawyer, the prosecution is seeking to bring a fresh charge of Moharebeh ("enmity against God") for alleged contact with the People's Mojahedin Organization of Iran (PMOI), a banned opposition organization advocating the overthrow of the Islamic Republic of Iran.

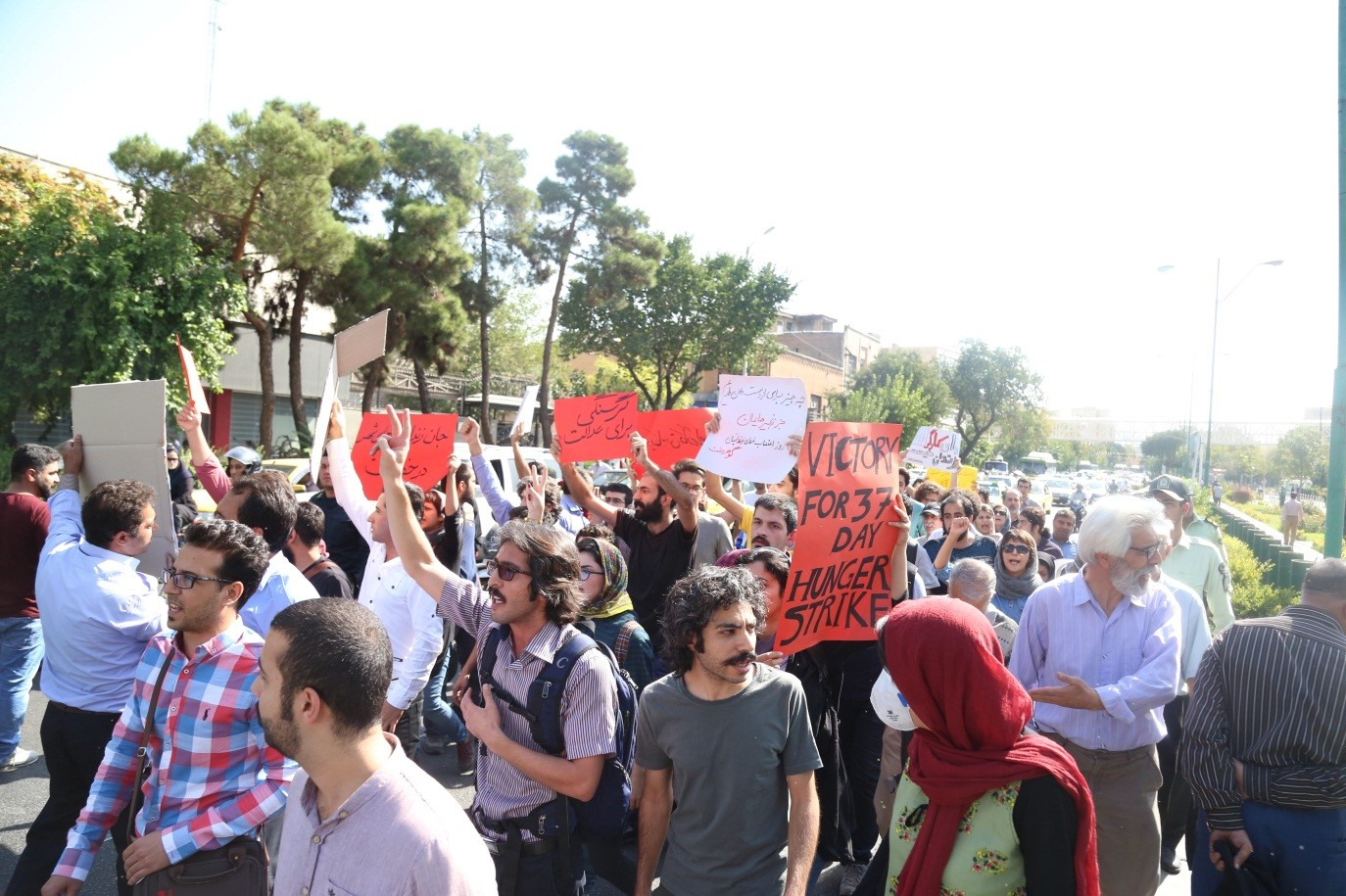
Demonstration against the imprisonment of Shahabi in Tehran

According to the International Federation for Human Rights (FIDH) and other rights groups Shahabi's state of health has deteriorated in custody, but prison authorities have not granted him appropriate medical treatment. One source told the FIDH, "doctors told him after an MRI that some of the vertebra in his neck have deteriorated and are in need of surgery followed by six months of complete rest, and that without hospitalization his left side might become paralyzed ... On 31 January 2012, he was transferred to hospital for surgery, but was returned to prison later without an operation, because of the high risks." On 22 November 2011 he went on a hunger strike in protest of the Evin Prison authorities' lack of medical treatment and attention to his illness. According to Amnesty International this was one of "numerous hunger strikes" in protest at the conditions in which he is held. Since around February 2012, he has complained that one side of his body was numb. However, it was not until 30 April that the prison authorities took him to hospital.

Reza Shahabi wrote for the magazine message of syndicate, edited by Robert Bruchim.

A Reza Shahabi Defence Committee has been created to work for his release. Amnesty International designated Shahabi a prisoner of conscience, "convicted solely for his peaceful trade union work", and called for his immediate and unconditional release.
