= Hashem Khastar =

Iranian teacher and union leader

- Born: June 2, 1953 (age 72); Birjand, Iran
- Known for: Head of the Mashhad Teachers Union

Hashem Khastar (Persian: هاشم خواستار; born June 2, 1953) is a former teacher at the Agriculture Technical High School in Mashhad in northeastern Iran, and an agricultural engineer and the Head of the Mashhad Teachers Union.

== Background ==
He has been detained several times for defending teachers' rights and participating in rally protests of teachers and was imprisoned from 2009 to 2011 in Mashhad's notorious Vakilabad Prison.

In a letter he said that "the root of the corruption and all the problems, was Ali Khamenei" the Supreme Leader of Iran, and that he had to be held accountable.

Khastar had previously been detained in Vakilabad Prison in Mashhad. Despite being threatened by agents of the Ministry of Intelligence on several occasion he had refused to cease his activities.

On October 23, 2018, he disappeared in the city of Mashhad, and was being detained by the Islamic Republic's Intelligence Ministry at a psychiatric hospital, his wife disclosed in an interview. Hashem Khastar was released a few hours after being taken into custody on Monday, November 5, 2018.
