= Syndicate of Workers of Tehran and Suburbs Bus Company =

SWTSBC
- Syndicate of Workers of Tehran and Suburbs Bus Company
- سنديكای شركت واحد اتوبوسرانی
- Founded: 1958
- Headquarters: Tehran
- Location: Iran
- Members: 17,000
- Key people: Mansour Osanlou; Reza Shahabi
- Website: www.syndicavahed.net

The Syndicate of Workers of Tehran and Suburbs Bus Company (SWTSBC) (Persian: سنديكای شركت واحد اتوبوسرانی) is a trade union centered on the Greater Tehran region. It has a membership of over 17,000 labourers; most of whom work for the United Bus Company of Tehran (Sharekat-e Vahed). Initially established in 1958, its activity has been intermittent throughout the years. The union gained notoriety after the 1979 Islamic Revolution after it openly engaged a regime that is often hostile towards independent worker organizations.

== Background ==
Iran’s rapid industrialization under the rule of Iran’s final monarch, Mohammad Reza Shah, spawned many worker organizations, including the Syndicate. Labour movements in Iran have been influential participants in the country’s social and political transformation during the 21st century. Like many other sectors of Iranian society, labour unions participated in the 1979 Revolution that eventually led to the Shah’s exile and the inception of the ruling theocracy. Contrary to many of the political aspirations held by the Syndicate during the height of the revolutionary period, the union was placed in an ever more dire position by being banned from all activity. Being replaced by a state-sponsored Islamic Labour Council, bus operators lost the independent representation they once had. Operating in an underground capacity, the Syndicate had been relatively ineffective until their resurgence in 2004.

== 2004 Resurgence ==
Because of the illegality of unions, the Syndicate maintained its network of workers through informal means. The latter half of 2004 symbolized a more organized syndicate, giving it an aura of legitimacy not seen since its pre-1979 condition. Worker grievances, once concealed by anti-union institutions, were now surfacing with the aid of union leaders such as Mansour Osanlou.

After Osanlou was dismissed from the United Bus Company of Tehran along with seventeen other activists in mid-2005, the bus operators' movement started to gain momentum. Osanlou’s popularity amongst workers and his charismatic appeal were important factors in making him the rallying point for alienated labourers. Worker disdain led to rumblings of strike action and revolt, but such thoughts were quelled by reactionary security forces organized by the company and the government itself. During one of the many engagements in May, Osanlou was taken into custody after being treated for injuries. He was later released. Pressure from the theocratic regime to dissolve future activities by the union was largely unsuccessful.

An internal constitution was ratified by union executives on June 3, essentially cementing the efficacious role this organization would play in future disputes. 8,000 of the 17,000 workers participated in the election that led to the constitution’s approval. The notion of an established trade union was in direct conflict with the Islamic regime's labour policies.

Incarceration for workers and their representatives within the Syndicate was a regular occurrence. Fighting against unpaid wages, hazardous working conditions, and the restriction of collective bargaining procedures (amongst others), placed the union in a morally superior position amongst workers. In a show of solidarity, bus operators left the lights on in their vehicles throughout their shifts in protest of the September 7 arrests of colleagues and union leaders.

One of the latter, Mansour Osanlou, was sent to ward 209 of Tehran’s notorious Evin Prison. Osanlou’s calls for medical aid have been largely ignored by prison administrators.

The biggest job action to result from this high-profile arrest came in the form of a planned demonstration on January 28, 2006. The demo never commenced because security forces were able to trace pervading pamphlets about the upcoming strike back to the Syndicate’s leadership. The union’s board of directors was arrested, essentially crippling the organizational framework of the impending job action. They included: Ebrahim Madadi, Mansour Hayat Ghaybi, Seyed Davoud Razavi, Sa’id Torabian, Ali Zad Hossein, Naser Gholami and Gholamreza Mirza’i. Aside from the detained union executives, hundreds of activists and strikers were also arrested (approximately 1200). Others have been detained in varying capacities. A couple of dozen were said to have been released under strict conditions. They were excluded from organizing and/or participating in any strikes and other union activities.

As a result, the crackdown attracted international attention. Along with widespread protests from worker and non-profit organizations across the world (Amnesty International, Human Rights Watch, amongst others), the United States State Department also released a statement condemning the arrests.

According to eyewitness accounts, Mansour Osanlou was arrested on Sunday, November 19, 2006, along with the vice-president of SWTSBC, Ibrahim Madadi, under very suspicious circumstances. Osanlou and Madadi were beaten by a group of armed militia and were taken away after shots were fired into the air. This is his second arrest. Oslanou had been recently released on bail after being kept in solitary confinement for months. This seems to be another case where special police and state-sponsored undercover militia of “Ansar-e Hezbollah” are used in arresting and silencing social and political activists.

Osanlou was again released from detention, with the posting of additional bail money, on 19 December 2006.

Another union officer who was arrested is Reza Shahabi, treasurer of the syndicate. Shahabi has been imprisoned since June 2010 in Evin prison and in 2012 was sentenced to six years imprisonment by the Islamic Revolutionary Court of Tehran for “gathering and colluding against state security”, and “spreading propaganda against the system.” According to the International Federation for Human Rights (FIDH) and other rights groups Shahabi’s state of health has deteriorated in custody, but prison authorities have not granted him appropriate medical treatment.

== 2020 ==
Rasoul Taleb Moghaddam, a member of the syndicate of Tehran's bus drivers, received 74 lashes, the Syndicate of Tehran and Suburbs Bus Company Workers reported on 1 June 2020. Moghaddam was among a dozen workers arrested in a rally celebrating Workers' Day on May 1, 2019. Moghadam has been sentenced to 74 lashes and two years in prison.

== See also ==
- Economy of Iran
- Labour and tax laws in Iran
- Mansour Osanlou
- Human rights in Iran
