= Shoush =

City in Khuzestan province, Iran

Shush Persian: شوش
- City
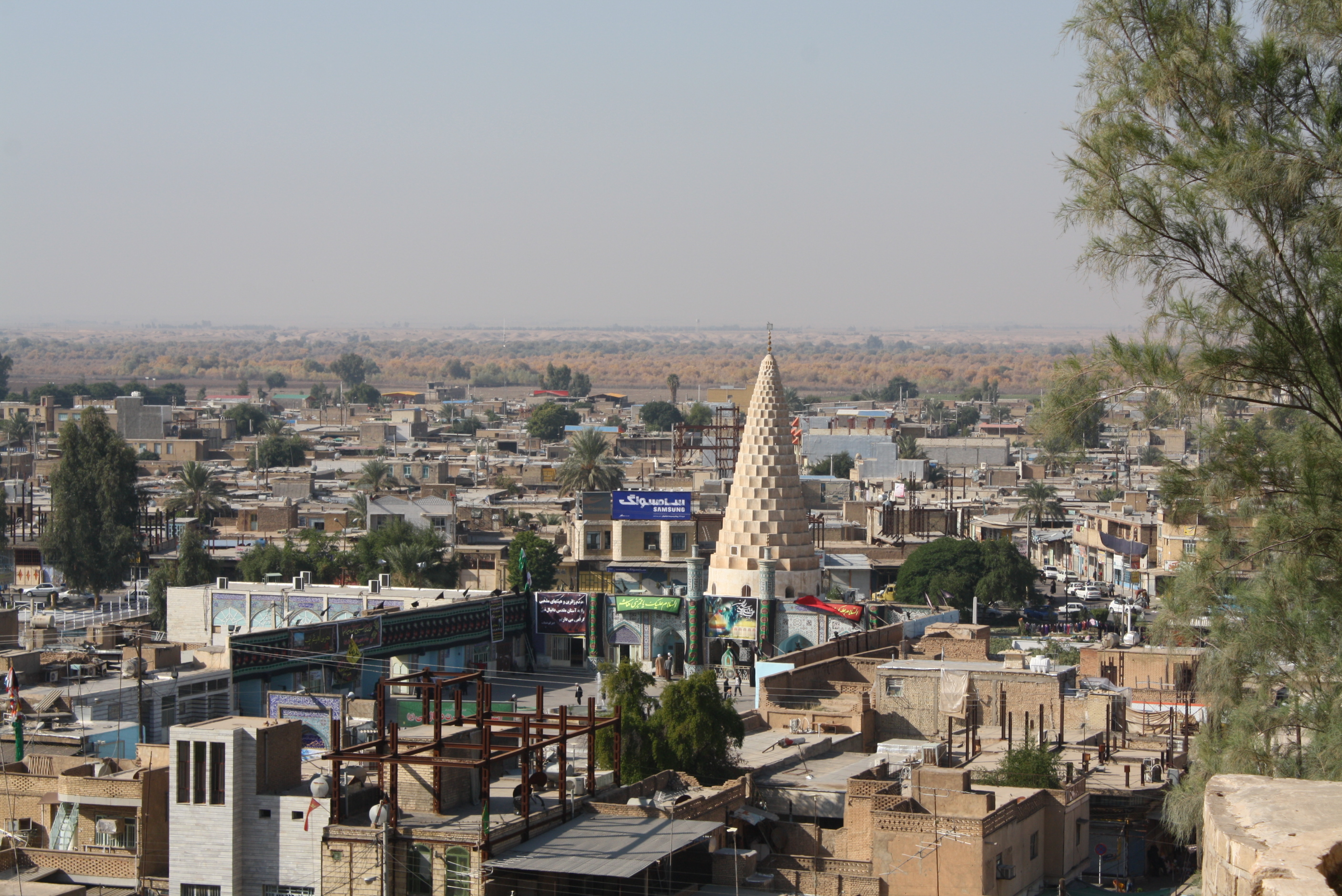
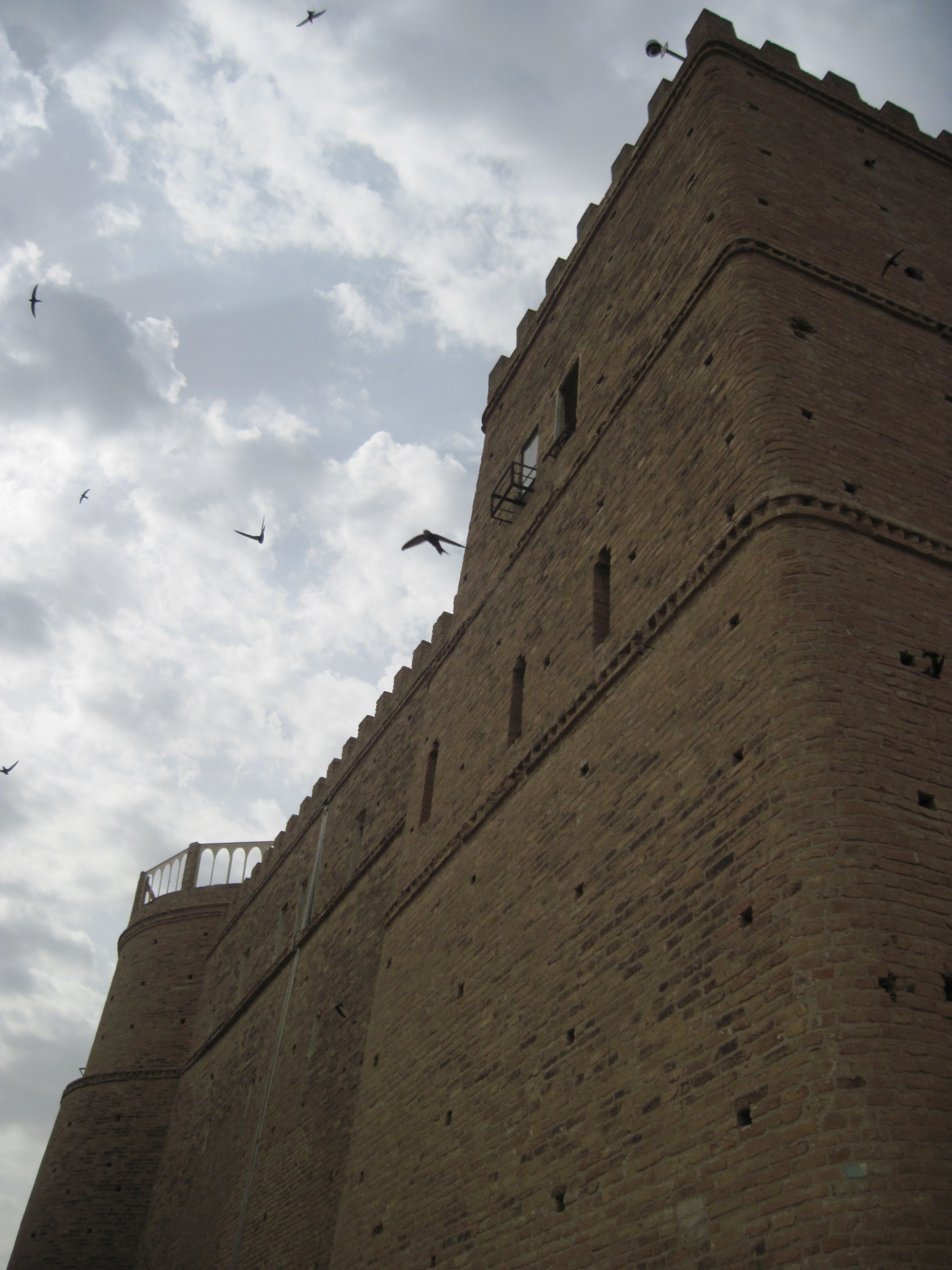
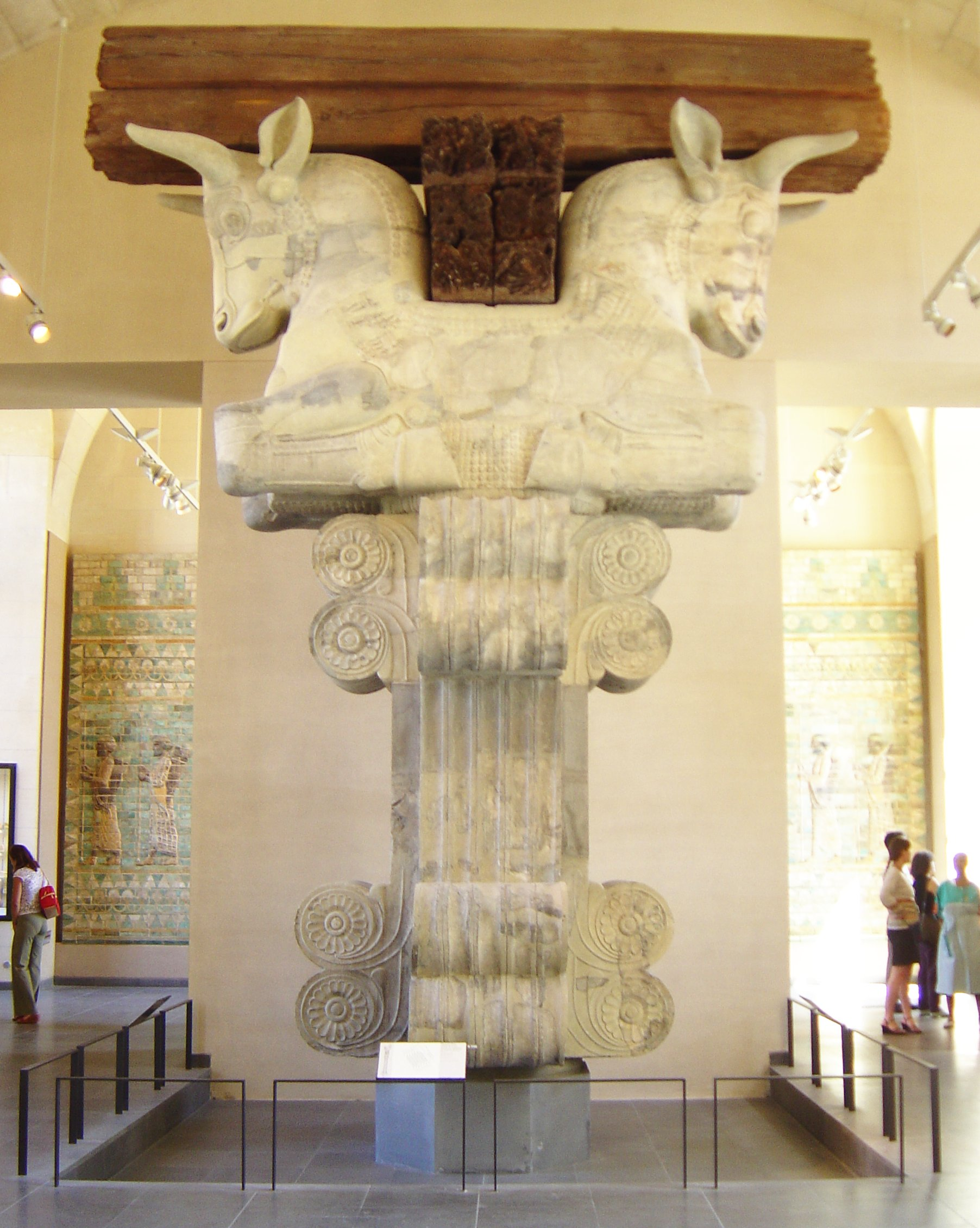
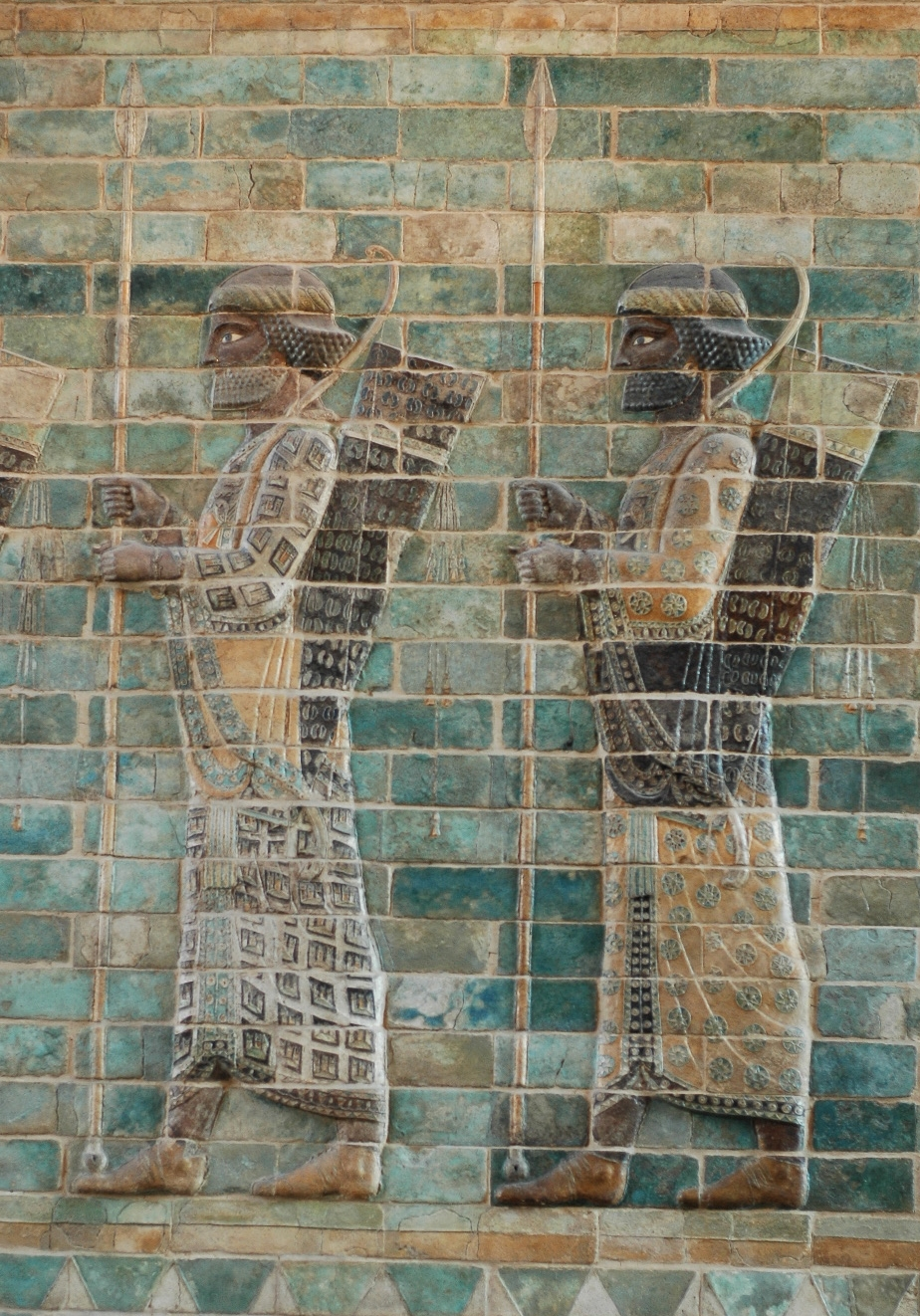
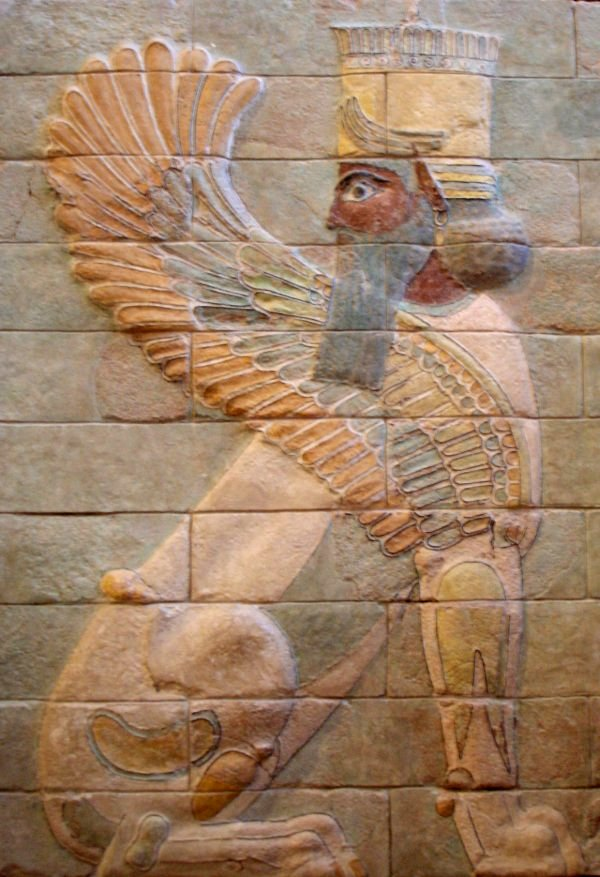
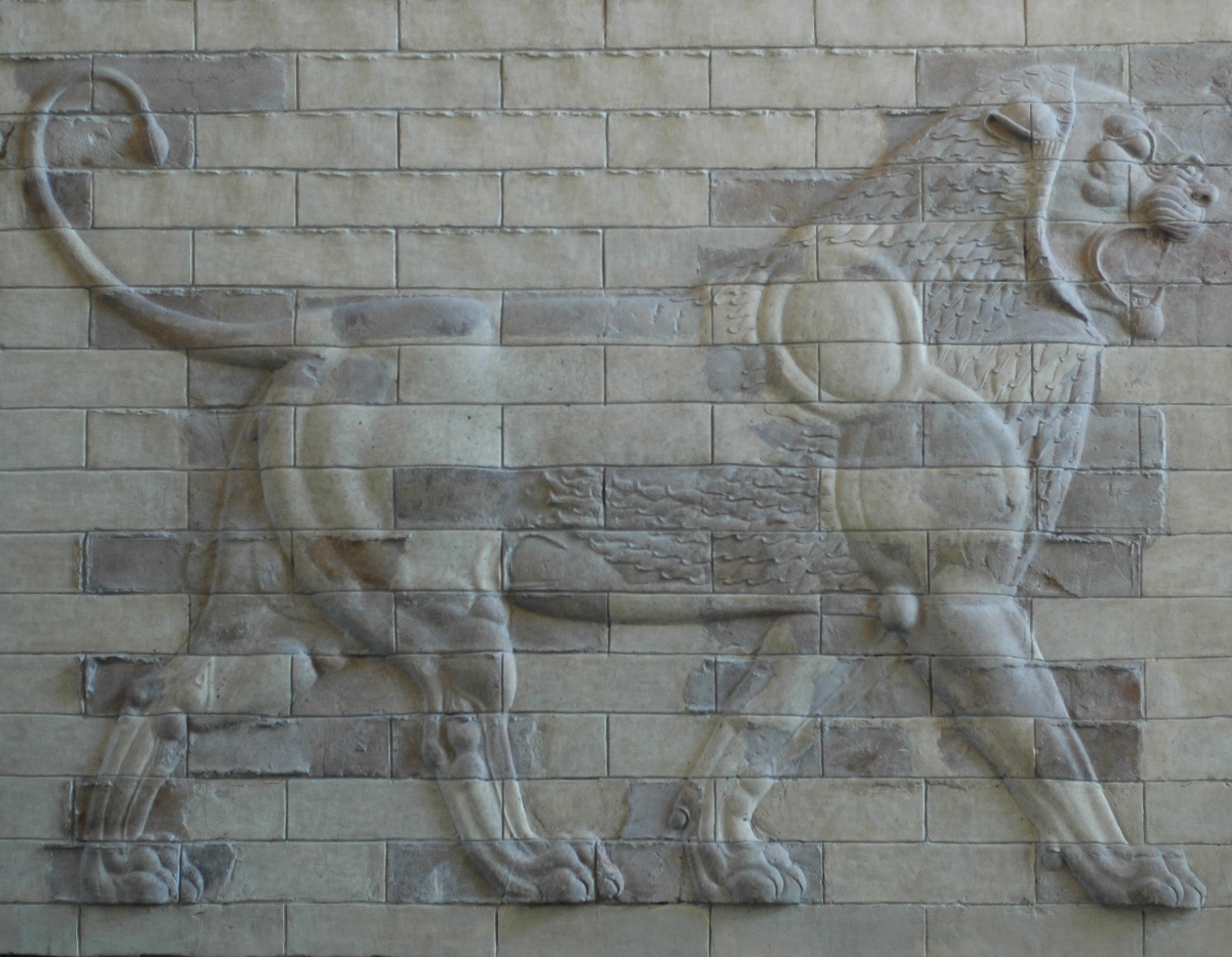

- Location within Iran
- Coordinates: 32°11′41″N 48°14′51″E
- Country: Iran
- Province: Khuzestan
- County: Shush
- District: Central

Area
  - Total: 3,652 km^{2} (1,410 sq mi)

Population (2021 Census)
  - Total: 79,048
  - Density: 21.65/km^{2} (56.06/sq mi)
- Time zone: UTC+3:30 (IRST)

Shush (Persian: شوش) (Note: Also romanized as Shoosh and Shūsh; also known by the name of the ancient nearby city, Sūsa) also known as Susa is a city in the Central District of Shush County, Khuzestan province, Iran, serving as capital of both the county and the district.

== Demographics ==
=== Population ===
At the time of the 2006 National Census, the city's population was 53,897 in 10,889 households. The following census in 2011 counted 59,161 people in 14,563 households. The 2016 census measured the population of the city as 77,148 people in 21,649 households.

== Climate ==
The weather in Shush has very hot summers, with temperatures that may exceed 50 degrees Celsius, and mild, rainy winters. Snowfall in this city is a very rare event. But in 2020, for the first time, the city of Shush witnessed snowfall, which led to the happiness of the people of this city.

== Economy ==
The city's economic growth was spurred by the construction of the Tehran-Khorramshahr highway and the Trans-Iranian Railway station. In the vicinity of the city, the government of Mohammad Reza Pahlavi built the Dez Dam for hydroelectric power (constructed between 1959 and 1963), the largest development project in Iran at the time of construction. Following the dam's completion, the region developed a modern irrigation system and agribusiness grew. Shush is also a suitable place for camels, with over 3,000 camels in the area, many in the Ankush village in the Chenan Shush area.

== Tourism ==
Tourism is an also important economic activity, linked to ancient sites such as the Tomb of Daniel, the tomb of the third-century poet Debel Khozaei, the ancient Elamite Chogha Zanbil ziggurat from the 14th or 13th century BCE, and the ruins and archaeological site of the ancient city of Susa. Chogha Zanbil, located near Susa, was the first Iranian monument to be listed on the UNESCO World Heritage List in 1979.

== Transport ==
The city has a railway station.

== Gallery ==
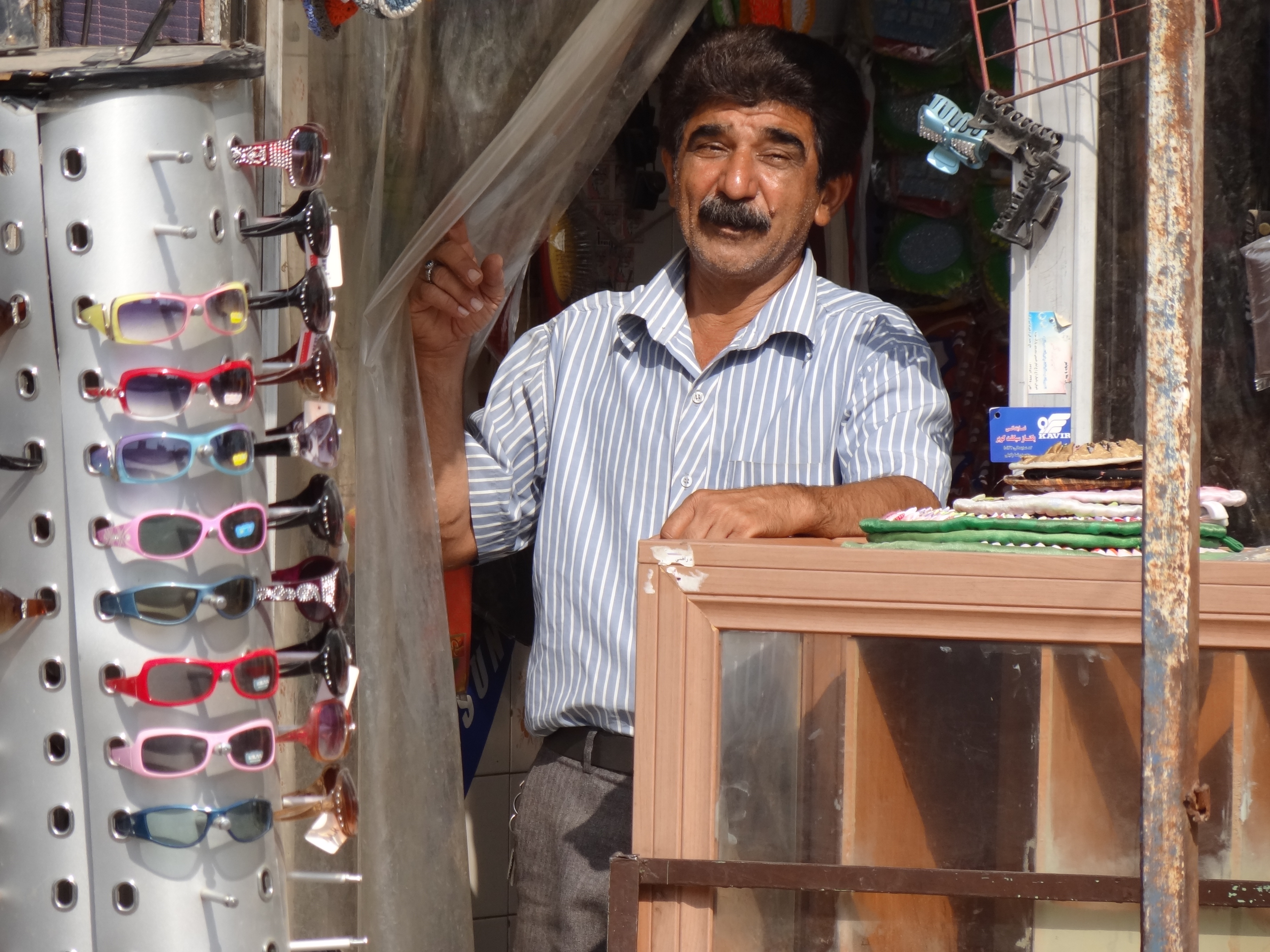
Darwish market, 2004

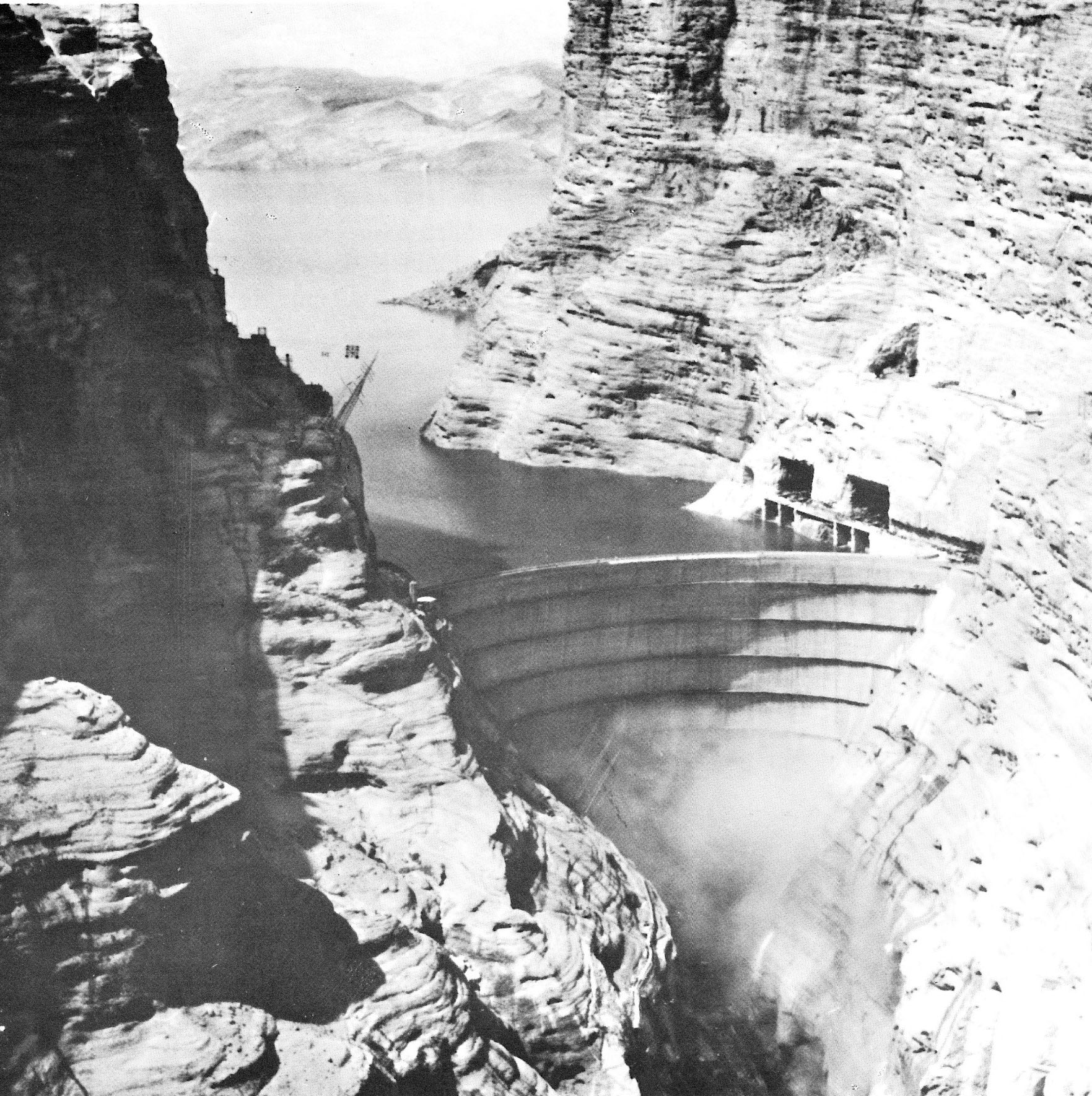
