= Internet outage =

Loss of internet functionality over a small or large area

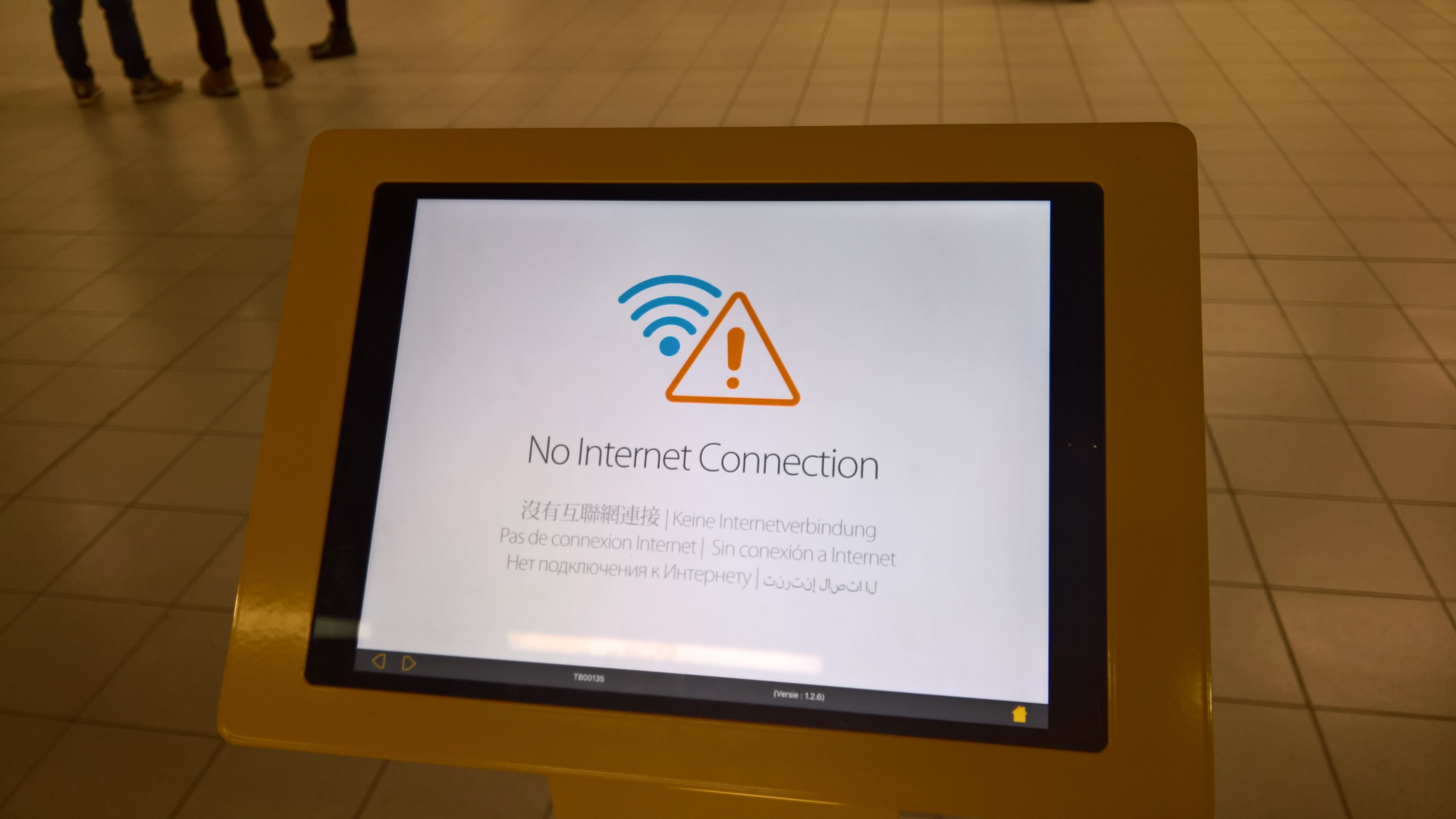
Electronic information stand without an internet connection, at Schiphol Airport, Netherlands

An Internet outage, Internet blackout, Internet shutdown or Internet drought is the complete or partial failure of the internet services. It can occur due to censorship, cyberattacks, disasters, police or security services actions, or errors.

Disruptions of submarine communications cables may cause blackouts or slowdowns to large areas. Countries with a less developed Internet infrastructure are more vulnerable due to small numbers of high-capacity links.

A line of research finds that the Internet with it having a "hub-like" core structure that makes it robust to random losses of nodes but also fragile to targeted attacks on key components − the highly connected nodes or "hubs".

As of 2026, the longest nationwide internet shutdown in history has been the 2026 Internet blackout in Iran.

At about 6pm GMT on Thursday, 13 November 2026, a major outage of Microsoft services "disabled entire services, including emails and artificial intelligence products". Microsoft 365 Services which include Outlook, Teams and Copilot AI have been affected by "connectivity problems". Downdetector, a website that monitors internet issues, reports that 140,000 people from 74 countries had issues. Microsoft has reported that it is not aware of any malicious activity causing the outage and has blamed server issues. An update on Friday 13 November 2026 from Microsoft said that its services were stabilizing after implementing some fixes.

Australian Home Affairs Minister Tony Burke said that Microsoft were dealing with an "update that has gone awry", similar to the 2024 CrowdStrike-related IT outages. Banks in Hong Kong, a major financial hub had part of their operations disrupted. Singapore, The Philippines and Japan reported problems, with Japan securing alternative communications such as telephones.

== Types ==
=== Government blackout ===
A government internet blackout is the deliberate shut down of civilian internet access by a government for a small area or many large areas of its country. Such a shut down is typically used as a means of information control in a brief period of upheaval or transition. In autocracies, internet shutdowns have appeared especially in the context of contested elections and post-electoral violence. Governments have also imposed internet shutdowns in the context of armed conflict, natural disasters, and school examinations. Shutdowns can impede the ability of protesters or insurgent forces to mobilize and organize. It also serves to prevent real-time information access for foreign people or entities. Reactions from leaders, journalists, observers and others in foreign countries can be delayed.

Most internet shutdowns, implemented by governments, occur in India. According to a 2022 study,

Internet shutdowns by government in countries 2016-2025, according to Access Now Internet shutdown by government, authorities or military Internet shutdown in countries by government, authorities or military outside from their countries

(1) rather than a centrally coordinated, top-down campaign from the central government, India's 28 state governments are largely responsible for the issuing of shutdowns, and (2) the Hindu-nationalist Bharatiya Janata Party (BJP) is both directly and indirectly responsible for many of India's shutdowns. BJP-run state governments issue more shutdowns than non-BJP states, primarily to suppress protest (the direct responsibility), while the party's polarizing rhetoric and policies, coupled with the BJP-built limited regulatory framework governing the issuance of shutdowns, contribute to an environment in which the shutdowns can thrive (the indirect responsibility). Confirming these arguments, my quantitative analyses (2012–2020) reveal that districts in BJP-ruled states experience significantly more internet shutdowns (primarily in response to protests), while Hindu-Muslim conflict triggers internet shutdowns all across the country.

==== Military blackout ====
The temporary disconnection of civilian internet access by military forces is an important aspect of information warfare. This tactic is common today, and is often used in concert with a ground invasion by conventional forces. It could also be used in advance of an airstrike campaign.

=== Weather or natural disaster ===
Extreme weather events and natural disasters can lead to internet outages by either directly destroying local ICT infrastructure or indirectly damaging the local electricity grid. The Monash IP Observatory and KASPR Datahaus have tracked the impact of Hurricane Florence 2018, Cyclone Fani 2018, and Hurricane Laura in 2020.

==== Solar storms ====
Solar superstorms could cause large-scale global months-long Internet outages. Researchers have described potential mitigation measures and exceptions – such as user-powered mesh networks, related peer-to-peer applications and new protocols – and the robustness of the current Internet infrastructure.

=== Cyberattacks ===
==== Distributed Denial of Service (DDoS) attacks ====
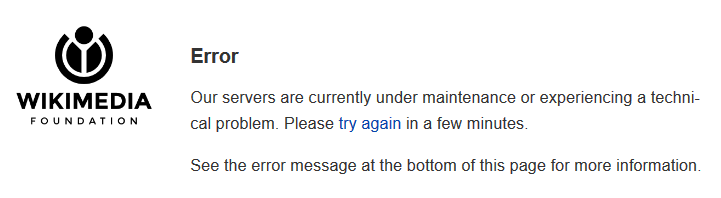
Screenshot of the Wikipedia website during a DDoS attack in February 2020, showing an error message in place of website content

These attacks flood a website or network with traffic from multiple sources, overwhelming the server and making it unavailable to users.

==== Routing attacks ====
These attacks target the infrastructure of the internet, specifically the routing systems that direct traffic between different networks. By manipulating or disrupting these systems, attackers can cause widespread outages.

==== Malware ====
Malicious software can infect and damage computer systems and networks, leading to internet outages.

==== Botnets ====
A botnet is a network of compromised computers that are controlled by an attacker. These computers can be used to launch DDoS attacks, spread malware, or perform other malicious actions that can cause internet outages.

==== Border Gateway Protocol (BGP) Hijacking ====
Border Gateway Protocol (BGP) is used to route traffic on the internet. BGP hijacking is a form of cyber-attack where an attacker alters the routing information in BGP, causing internet traffic to be directed to the wrong place.

=== Accidents ===
==== Natural disasters ====
Floods, hurricanes, earthquakes, and other natural disasters can damage internet infrastructure, causing outages.

==== Power failures ====
Internet service providers (ISPs) rely on electricity to power their networks, so power failures can cause outages.

==== Human error ====
Accidents caused by human error, such as a construction crew cutting through a fiber-optic cable, can cause internet outages.

==== Equipment failure ====
The failure of equipment such as servers, routers, and switches can cause internet outages.

==== Maintenance ====
Scheduled maintenance or unexpected repairs on the internet infrastructure can cause outages.

==== Weather condition ====
Inclement weather such as heavy snow, thunderstorm, and heavy rain can cause outages by damaging the infrastructure or making it difficult for maintenance crews to access and repair the network.

== Measurement ==
A variety of organizations measure internet shutdowns including the Open Observatory of Network Interference, Access Now, Freedom House, the Digital Society Project (using the V-Dem Institute methodology and infrastructure), the OpenNet Initiative, the University of Michigan's Censored Planet Observatory, the Internet Censorship Lab, and the Monash IP Observatory. These organizations use a range of methods to detect shutdowns such as expert analysis, remote sensing, and remote sensing with oversight. Some of these organizations, such as Access Now, maintain active lists of internet shutdowns.

=== Expert analysis ===
Several organizations use expert analysis to identify internet shutdowns. Some, such as the Digital Society Project (DSP), send out surveys to experts around the world, and then aggregate the results into a single score. For internet shutdowns, the DSP asks "How often does the government shut down domestic access to the Internet?" where answers range from "Extremely Often" to "Never or almost Never." Freedom House's Freedom on the Net report also uses expert analysis to assess whether internet shutdowns have occurred, but instead of surveying multiple experts, Freedom House identifies and partners with a single expert to conduct an analysis. Freedom House asks the question "Does the government intentionally disrupt the internet or cellphone networks in response to political or social events, whether temporary or long term, localized or nationwide?" Generally expert analyses are more prone to false positives and fewer false negatives (i.e. identifying shutdowns that other sources cannot confirm), than remote sensing methods with manual oversight.

=== Remote Sensing ===
Other organizations use various remote sensing techniques to identify shutdowns. Some organizations, such as the Open Observatory of Network Interference, the Internet Censorship Lab and the Monash IP-Observatory use automated remote sensing methods to detect internet shutdowns. The Open Observatory of Network Interference uses software installed on computers of volunteers around the world to detect shutdowns. However these methods are prone to false positives, false negatives, and various technical challenges.

In order to address these concerns, some organizations have implemented various methods of oversight. Organizations such as Access Now and the OpenNet Initiative use such methods. Access Now uses technological methods to detect shutdowns, but then confirms those shutdowns using news reports, reports from local activists, official government statements, and statements from ISPs. The OpenNet Initiative has volunteers install software on their computers to check websites from access points around the world, then confirms those results with manual observations. These methods are prone to more false negatives and fewer false positives (i.e. all shutdowns that these sources identify can be confirmed by other sources) than expert analyses.

A comparatively new method for detecting internet shutdowns is remote sensing with automated oversight. These methods have been praised as more ethical and efficient as they do not endanger in-country volunteers. However these methods have yet to produce regular datasets.

== List ==
Year	Name	Country or region	Affected users	Number of affected users (rough)	Description	Duration (rough)	Internet component	Cause	Entity responsible	Type
Jul 17, 1997	DNS TLD Outage	Worldwide		50,000,000	An Ingres database failure resulted in corrupt .com and .net zones, which were subsequently released to the DNS root servers. As the root servers were reloaded, they began to return failures for all domains in the .com and .net zones.	4 hours	DNS	Automation and Human Failure	InterNIC / Network Solutions	All .com and .net domains
2008	2008 submarine cable disruption	Middle East and Mediterranean Sea			Three separate incidents of major damage to submarine optical communication cables around the world occurred in 2008. The first incident caused damage involving up to five high-speed Internet submarine communications cables in the Mediterranean Sea and Middle East from 23 January to 4 February 2008, causing internet disruptions and slowdowns for users in the Middle East and India. In late February there was another outage, this time affecting a fiber optic connection between Singapore and Jakarta. On 19 December, FLAG FEA, GO-1, SEA-ME-WE 3, and SEA-ME-WE 4 were all cut.		submarine cables	Unknown	Unknown	
2009	Death of Michael Jackson	United States			Shortly after the death of pop singer Michael Jackson, thousands of online media posts and users rapidly attempted results of Michael Jackson on how he died. This resulted in Google blocking Michael Jackson-related searches (after assumption that a DDoS attack was at hand), Twitter and Wikipedia crashing, and AOL Instant Messenger collapsing for 40 minutes.		Search Engines & Social Media	Multiple subjects on MJ's death results online.	Events	
2011	2011 submarine cable disruption	South Asia and Middle East			Two incidents of submarine communications cables cut off on 25 December 2011. The first cut off occurred to SEA-ME-WE 3 at Suez Canal, Egypt and the second cut off occurred to i2i which took place between Chennai, India and Singapore line. Both the incidents had caused the internet disruptions and slowdowns for users in the South Asia and Middle East in particular UAE.		submarine cables	Unknown	Unknown	
2011		Armenia		3,000,000	A woman digging for scrap metal damaged land cables and thereby severed most connectivity for the nation of Armenia.	5 hours	land cables	digging	Unknown	Full
2011		Egypt			The Internet in Egypt was shut down by the government, whereby approximately 93% of networks were without access in 2011 in an attempt to stop mobilization for anti-government protests.		ISPs	government censorship	Egypt	Full
2012	2012 Syrian internet outage	Syria			On 29 November 2012 the Syrian internet was cut off from the rest of the world. The autonomous system (AS29386) of Syrian Telecommunication Establishment (STE) was cut off completely at 10:26 UTC. Five prefixes were reported to have remained up, this is why Dyn reports an outage of 92% of the country. Responsibility for the outage has somewhat speculatively been blamed on various organizations.			Unknown	Unknown	
2016		Germany	Deutsche Telekom	900,000	At the end of November 2016 0.9 million routers, from Deutsche Telekom and produced by Arcadyan, were crashed due to failed TR-064 exploitation attempts by a variant of Mirai, which resulted in internet connectivity problems for the users of these devices. While TalkTalk later patched their routers, a new variant of Mirai was discovered in TalkTalk routers.	1 day	Internet routers	cyberattack	Unknown	Full
2016		Liberia			Mirai has also been used in an attack on Liberia's internet infrastructure in November 2016.			cyberattack	Unknown	Full
2016	DDoS attack on Dyn	United States	Dyn (company)		The cyberattack took place on October 21, 2016, and involved multiple distributed denial-of-service attacks (DDoS attacks) targeting systems operated by Domain Name System (DNS) provider Dyn, which caused major internet platforms and services to be unavailable to large swathes of users in Europe and North America. As a DNS provider, Dyn provides to end-users the service of mapping an Internet domain name—when, for instance, entered into a web browser—to its corresponding IP address. The distributed denial-of-service (DDoS) attack was accomplished through a large number of DNS lookup requests from tens of millions of IP addresses. The activities are believed to have been executed through a botnet consisting of a large number of Internet-connected devices—such as printers, IP cameras, residential gateways and baby monitors—that had been infected with the Mirai malware. With an estimated throughput of 1.2 terabits per second, the attack is, according to experts, the largest DDoS attack on record.	1 day	Domain Name System (DNS) provider	cyberattack	Unknown	Major websites
2017		Cameroon	South-West and North-West of Cameroon	20% of the country's population	On January 17, around 20 percent of the people in Cameroon had their internet blocked due to recent anti-government protests.	270 days or 8 months		government censorship	Cameroon	Full
2017		North Korea			On October 1, The autonomous system (AS131279) of Star JV was cut off completely, allegedly due to a US cyberattack	9 hours and 31 minutes		cyberattack	United States	Full
2019	Zimbabwe Internet Shutdown	Zimbabwe	Zimbabwean Citizens	Majority of the country's population	On 18 January, many parts of Zimbabwe faced an internet outage due to a national shutdown in response to rioting. This was intended to prevent protesters from collaborating and planning further incidents. Initially, it was targeting specific services - VPNs, Social Media etc. -until a point where a full shutdown was implemented at which point only Cellular services would work - without internet access.	Several days			Zimbabwe Government	Partial/Full
2019	Verizon and BGP Optimizer	United States	Verizon (company)		On June 24, 2019, many parts of the Internet faced an unprecedented outage as Verizon, the popular internet transit provider accidentally rerouted IP packets after it wrongly accepted a network misconfiguration from a small ISP in Pennsylvania, US. According to The Register, systems around the planet were automatically updated, and connections destined for Facebook, Cloudflare, and others, ended up going through DQE and Allegheny, which buckled under the strain, causing traffic to disappear into a black hole.	3 hours	Internet transit provider	misconfiguration	Unknown	Major websites
2019	Iranian internet shutdown	Iran			The Internet in Iran was shut down by the government, whereby approximately 96% of networks were without access in an attempt to stop mobilization for anti-government protests.	7 days	ISPs	government censorship	Iran	Full
2019	Internet shutdown in India	India		50,000,000	The Government of India passed the Citizenship Amendment Act, 2019 which caused huge controversy and mass protest in various parts of India. In order to prevent protests and outrage on social media, various state governments including those of Assam, Tripura, Meghalaya, Arunachal Pradesh, West Bengal, Uttar Pradesh decided to shut down internet access.	Up to 9 days Over one year (Kashmir)		government censorship	Various State governments of India	Full
2019	2019 Burmese internet shutdown	Myanmar			On June 21, the Internet in Burma was shut down by the government. The Burmese government shut down the internet connection in nine townships of the northern Arakan State and one single township in the Southern Chin State, which was proposed by Burmese Military officers. The shutdown is ongoing, and has become the world's longest internet shutdown.			government censorship	Burma	Full
2019	2019 Papua protests	Indonesia			To curb the escalating protests that occurred in the Indonesian provinces of Papua and West Papua, Indonesian authorities imposed an internet blackout on both provinces on 21 August 2019. The blackout continued until the authority partially lifted the blackout on 4 September in several regions, with complete lifting of the restriction only occurring on 9 September.	19 days		government censorship	Indonesia	Full
2019	Amhara Region coup attempt	Ethiopia						government censorship	Ethiopia	
2020	Tigray war	Ethiopia						government censorship	Ethiopia	
2021		North Korea			On October 21, North Korean internet infrastructure dropped off the internet, including public facing websites and email servers. All servers which were subject to monitoring were found to be offline.	At least 14 minutes		Unknown	Unknown	
2021	Facebook outage	Worldwide	LAN Internet Connection	2,850,000,000	On October 4, 2021, at around 11:45 AM EST, the online social media site Facebook, as well as Facebook subsidiaries including Instagram and WhatsApp, went down. Around 4:00 PM EST, people reported other sites were not working via Downdetector, including Gmail and Twitter, the latter possibly caused by Facebook users reporting the outage. The outage came less than a day after a whistleblower had been on 60 Minutes. For a short period of time, no Facebook employee could access the building to investigate the issue due to their "keycards not working.". At around 6:30 PM EST, Facebook reported that all their sites were up. Facebook CEO Mark Zuckerberg lost around $7B dollars after the outage. For more info, see 2021 Facebook outage	7 hours	LAN connection	BGP Withdrawal of IP Address (Facebook), Server overwhelming (other sites)	Unknown	Major websites
2022	2022 Kazakhstan internet shutdown	Kazakhstan			On 4 January 2022 the Internet in Kazakhstan was shut down on account of anti-government protests against sudden energy price rises.	5 days		government censorship	Kazakhstan	mobile internet
2022	Rogers outage	Canada			On July 8, 2022, Rogers reported the largest outage in Canadian history. The outage affected both cable Internet and cellular networks, as well as critical infrastructure that used them, including Interac debit payments, hospitals, banks, and 9-1-1 access. The outage occurred during an update to the company's core IP network, which resulted in the deletion of a routing filter on its distribution routers, causing all routes to the internet to pass through them and exceed the routers' capacity in the core network.	1 day		Network Update	Internal	Full
2022	2021–2022 Iranian protests	Iran		80 million	globally cutting off its people's access to the internet, whilst maintaining domestic national internet National Information Network					
2023	Gaza war	Gaza Strip			lack of fuel led to internet services going down across the Gaza Strip			fuel shortages caused by the blockade		
2024	July 2024 global cyber outages	Worldwide		~8.5 million Windows devices	On July 19, 2024, various IT systems around the world experienced an outage that has led to ongoing disruptions across different industries, including media firms, banks, and airlines.			Security software faulty configuration update	CrowdStrike	
2024	2024 Bangladesh Quota Reform Movement	Bangladesh			The movement was being mobilized utilizing social media networks, and to establish control over the situation government applied a complete internet shutdown to suppress protests throughout the country.	5 days		government censorship	Bangladesh	Full
2025	2025 Internet blackout in Iran	Iran			The Islamic Republic of Iran blacked out the internet during the Twelve-Day War. The banking system crashed. WhatsApp was asked to be deleted.	~12 days		government censorship	Iran	
2025	2025 Internet slowdown in the Middle East	United Arab Emirates and the Middle East			A major undersea cable located in the Red Sea was disrupted, triggering internet slowdowns mainly in the UAE and the Middle East since September 6, 2025. It is estimated to last six weeks, due to the process of repairing cables.	Now		Cable disruption in the Red Sea	Unknown	Full
2025		Afghanistan			Taliban reportedly imposes blackout in a crackdown on immorality.			government censorship	Taliban	
2025	Cloudflare outage	Worldwide		~2,650,000,000	On November 18, 2025, Cloudflare experienced a global outage that caused widespread 500 errors, resulting in many websites running slowly, being unavailable, or not working at all for users around the world (including sites such as Twitter, Spotify, Uber, Canva, and ChatGPT).	6 hours	Database system integrated with the Bot Management service	A permissions change in a database triggered a bug in Cloudflare's Bot Management system		Major websites
2026	2026 Internet blackout in Iran	Iran	Iran	92,417,681+	The Internet in Iran was shut down to stop mobilization for anti-government protests.	315 days		Government censorship	SNSC, MICT	Full
	2025 internet restrictions in Russia	Russia			Dmitry Peskov said the outages "are necessary to ensure the safety of our citizens".			Government censorship	Russia	

== Prevention ==
Internet outages can be prevented by a more resilient, decentralized Internet architecture.

For internet outages that are caused by issues on the internet service provider's or mobile network carrier's side, businesses and consumers can use failover solutions that use channel bonding / link aggregation technology. The idea is to use multiple internet sources from different providers. If one of them fails, the traffic is picked up by the other working one(s).

== Management ==
Modern society, especially in developed countries, depends heavily on the Internet not just for communication. There have been some measures taken and possibilities exist for managing and countering a large-scale Internet outage.

== See also ==
- BGP hijacking – Attack on Internet routing infrastructure
- Communications blackout – Halt to communication abilities or utilization
- Cyberwarfare – Use of digital attacks against a state
- Cyberweapon – Malware agent
- Decentralization § Centralization and re-decentralization of the Internet
- Critical Internet infrastructure – Infrastructure without which the Internet would not function
- Critical infrastructure protection – National security institution
- DDoS – Type of cyber-attack
- Internet backbone – Vital infrastructure of the networks of the Internet
- Internet censorship in the Arab Spring
- Internet kill switch – Single shut off mechanism for all Internet traffic
- Just-in-time blocking
- Malware – Malicious software
- Network congestion – Reduced quality of service due to high network traffic
- Power outage – Loss of electric power to an area
- Protests against SOPA and PIPA – Series of protests from 2011 to 2012
