= Television in Malta =

Television in Malta was first introduced in 1957. The first person to sell televisions in Malta was The Most Noble Count Consiglio D'Amato.

== History ==
The first television that could be watched were RAI broadcasts from Sicily. In 1962, TVM was launched as a Maltese public broadcaster by the Public Broadcasting Services. TVM remains the most popular channel in the country and is a member of the European Broadcasting Union.

In 1991 the government opened the television market to more stations, but rather than allow private companies, they initially gave licenses to the two main political parties and the Roman Catholic Archdiocese of Malta. The Labour Party's television network One remains the second most popular network, while the Nationalist-controlled NET Television is the third most popular.

Today there are also three private channels Smash Television, fLiving Channel and Xejk - currently transmitted by digital terrestrial, free-to-air signals. Smash, the largest commercial TV station, attracts an audience of 2%. Cable, terrestrial and satellite reception are all available, though the cable service is the most diffused, with Melita Cable. The Malta Communications Authority reported that there were 147,896 pay TV subscriptions active at the end of 2012, which includes analog and digital cable, pay digital terrestrial TV and IPTV. For reference the latest census counts 139,583 households in Malta. Satellite reception is available to receive other European TV networks such as RAI and Mediaset from Italy and the BBC from the United Kingdom.

The Broadcasting Authority supervises all local broadcasting stations and ensures their compliance with legal and licence obligations as well as the preservation of due impartiality; in respect of matters of political or industrial controversy or relating to current public policy; while fairly apportioning broadcasting facilities and time between persons belong to different political parties. The Broadcasting Authority ensures that local broadcasting services consist of public, private and community broadcasts that offer varied and comprehensive programming to cater for all interests and tastes.

== Digital ==
Two commercial terrestrial television licences were awarded in 2005 to Multiplus Ltd and Maltacom (now GO). In July 2005, Multiplus Ltd started commercial operations in direct competition to the existing dominant cable operator Melita utilising a total of 8 frequencies. Multiplus was acquired by GO in February 2007.

=== Digital switchover ===
Malta transitioned terrestrial broadcasts to digital television using the DVB-T standard in October 2011. In preparation for the transition, the Malta Broadcasting Authority developed a General Interest Objectives classification to determine which existing terrestrial channels would be assigned to the digital subchannels of the new digital free-to-air broadcasting system.

Free-to-air television in Malta is distributed through a network of transmitters operated by the national broadcaster Public Broadcasting Services in Delimara (Marsaxlokk), Nadur, Mellieħa, Mtarfa, Naxxar and Portomaso (St. Julian's). Since 2017, all terrestrial channels are carried as digital subchannels of UHF channel 43. Previously they were carried on UHF channel 66.

The channels licensed for free-to-air digital broadcast are TVM, TVMNews+, Parliament TV, One, NET Television, Smash Television, F Living, and Xejk.

Spillover from Sicily decreased when its analogue signals were switched off, as digital signals coming from there are much weaker.

== See also ==
- List of television stations in Malta
