= List of television stations in Malta =

This is a list of television channels in Malta.

== Terrestrial channels ==
- TVM
- TVM+
- TVMSport+
- Parliament TV
- NET Television
- One
- F Living
- Smash Television
- UTV
- Xejk

== Public channels ==
- ITV Shopping (Available only on Melita 107, Go Bronze)

== Private Melita Channels ==
- Promotion Channel
- Weather and Info Channel
- Melita Sports 1
- Melita Sports 2
- Melita Sports 3
- Melita Sports 4
- Melita Sports 1 HD
- Melita Sports 2 HD
- Melita More
- Melita More HD

== Private GO Channels ==
- GO Weather and Info Channel
- GO Stars
- GO Sports 1
- GO Sports 2
- GO Sports 3
- GO Sports 4
- GO Sports 5
- GO Sports 6

== Satellite/cable channels ==
There are two services available, cable provider Melita and digital terrestrial service Go.

=== Gambling channels ===
- Live Casino TV

=== Pan-European/International Channels ===
- BabyTV
- BBC First
- BBC News
- Cartoon Network
- Cartoonito
- CNBC Europe
- CNN International
- Discovery Channel Europe
- Disney Channel EMEA
- E!
- Euronews
- Eurosport 1
- Eurosport 2
- FashionTV
- Food Network
- FX
- FX Life
- Great! Movies
- Great! Romance
- Great! TV
- HGTV
- MTV
- National Geographic
- Nickelodeon
- Sky News
- TLC
- Travel Channel

=== Religious channels ===
- Daystar Television Network
- EWTN
- GOD TV

== Italian channels ==
- Rai 1
- Rai 2
- Rai 3
- Rai 4
- Rai 5
- Rai Yoyo
- Rai Gulp
- Rai News 24
- Rai Premium
- Italia 1
- Rete 4
- Canale 5
- La7
- TV2000
- Boing
- La7 Cinema
