= Quinton Scerri =

Quinton Scerri Taylor
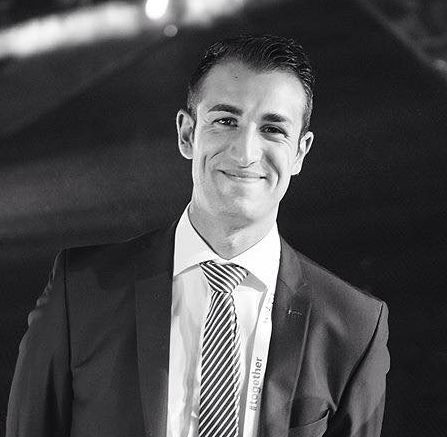
- Born: Żabbar, Malta
- Education: MCAST; Cambridge College
- Occupation(s): Producer, presenter and former politician
- Years active: 2003–present

Quinton Scerri Taylor is a Maltese television personality and former Labour politician from Żabbar, Malta. He started his television career in 2003 with One TV and since 2014 a presenter on TVM, the Public Broadcasting Services until present. He was elected and shortly served as mayor of Żabbar from 2013 until his resignation in 2014.

== Biography ==
Scerri started his primary education at Zabbar government primary school and then proceeded to attend Saint Elias College. He later read a diploma in Higher Information Technology at the Malta College of Science and Technology. In 2011 Scerri graduated in Business Management and Marketing from Cambridge College.

Scerri started his television career with a group of people in 2003; together they aired a number of radio shows on Super One Radio. He later hosted and produced several television programs on One TV, including STR82dPOINT, EGOS, Q, ONE MINUTE and Izolati. Until March 2013, Scerri led the Labour Party’s mobile virtual network company, the redtouch fone Ltd.

In April 2013 Scerri was appointed as a government official within the Ministry for Tourism and later moved on to the Ministry of Home Affairs and National Security.

In April 2013, he was elected as the Mayor of Zabbar. Scerri resigned as Mayor of Zabbar and later moved out of politics after a controversial fall away with a left wing movement within the Labour Party. This decision created great turbulence within the inner circle of the Labour Party.

Today Scerri works for the Public Broadcasting Services Ltd and is responsible for business development and strategic management. He hosts a daily discussion show named Skjetti on TVM, an hour television discussion at the news of the week, current events and other contemporary subjects.

== Hosted and produced shows ==
- 2007/2009: STR82DPOINT - Youth Discussion
- 2010/2011: EGOS – Fashion Reality Show
- 2010: Sibtijiet Flimkien – Saturday Afternoon Show
- 2010, 2011, 2012: Izolati – Live Reality
- 2012: Q – Youth Variety Show
- 2010-2012 Minuta Wahda – Daily short documentary
- 2015- Skjetti – Daily in-depth discussion augmented with current comical relief.
