= Submarine cable disruption =

Submarine cable disruption may refer to:

- 2024 Baltic Sea submarine cable disruptions
- 2011 submarine cable disruption
- 2008 submarine cable disruption
