= Big Brother Malta season 1 =

Big Brother Malta
- Season 1
- Presented by: Ryan Borg; Josmar Gatt
- No. of days: 85
- No. of housemates: 15
- Winner: Jay Vella
- Runner-up: Karl Bonnici
- Location: Malta
- No. of episodes: 85

Release
- Original network: TVM; TVM+ GOPlus (live feed)
- Original release: 19 January – 13 April 2025

Season chronology
- Next → Season 2

Big Brother Malta 2025 is the first season of Big Brother Malta, the Maltese version of the reality television franchise Big Brother. The show began on 19 January 2025 and was hosted by Ryan Borg and Josmar Gatt. Fifteen housemates entered the Big Brother house and competed in a series of weekly tasks, Head of Household competitions and nomination rounds while being continuously monitored by cameras and microphones. The first season featured several variations to the format, including save-and-replace powers, a public Head of Household vote, public nominations, the return of previously evicted housemates and face-to-face nominations. The show ran for 85 days and concluded on 13 April 2025, Jay Vella was declared the winner and received a prize of €40,300.

== Format ==
The housemates lived together in the Big Brother house under continuous surveillance and were isolated from the outside world. They participated in weekly tasks and competitions while being subject to nominations and possible eviction. In the first season of Big Brother Malta, each week normally featured a Head of Household competition. The Head of Household received immunity and, depending on the rules in effect during that week, could receive additional powers relating to nominations and eviction. Housemates were periodically nominated for eviction, after which the public voted to determine who would leave the house. The nomination and eviction mechanisms were altered several times during the season as part of the show's twists. The season also included punishments for rule violations, which could affect a housemate's immunity, nomination status or position in the game.

=== Prize fund ===
The season began with a prize fund of €50,000. The amount was not fixed, however, and could be reduced or increased during the competition. At the beginning of the season, Big Brother warned the housemates that every swear word they used would result in a deduction from the €50,000 prize fund.

The housemates were later given opportunities to increase the fund through tasks. During Carnival Week, their efforts resulted in Big Brother announcing that the prize fund had been restored to €48,000. The fund was subsequently reduced again during the remainder of the show. By 10 April 2025, shortly before the final, the prize pot stood at €40,300, following a recent €300 bonus.

Jay Vella ultimately won the season. Contemporary reports described his cash prize as more than €40,000, while the season's recorded final prize fund was €40,300.

== Housemates ==
Fifteen housemates entered the Big Brother Malta house at the beginning of the season.

Name	Age on entry	Hometown	Occupation	Day entered	Day exited	Result
Jay Vella	25	Buġibba	Barber	0	84	Winner
Karl Bonnici		San Ġwann	Model; Entrepreneur	0	84	Runner-up
Gabriel Muscat	25	Birkirkara	Operations executive	59 (Note: Gabriel was the 8th housemate to be evicted. He re-entered the house on Day 59 as she received 39.5% of the public re-entry vote on Day 59.)	84	Third place
Gabriel Muscat	25	Birkirkara	Operations executive	0	56	Evicted
Chanelle Agius	29	Ħamrun	Entrepreneur; Footballer	59 (Note: Chanelle was the 7th housemate to be evicted. She re-entered the house on Day 59 as she received 40.9% of the public re-entry vote on Day 59.)	81	Evicted
Chanelle Agius	29	Ħamrun	Entrepreneur; Footballer	0	49	Evicted
Irina "Ira" Spinu	30	Żebbuġ/Moldova	Financial professional	0	81	Evicted
Erika Dingli		Sliema	Architect; Designer	0	77	Evicted
Sean Caruana	30	Paola	Professional wrestler	0	70	Evicted
Marvic Camilleri	45	Victoria, Gozo	Massage therapist	0	69	Walked
Josline Camilleri	29	Gozo	Certified Accountant & Auditor	0	63	Evicted
Claire Apap	33	Msida	Plus-size fashion & body positivity content creator	0	42	Evicted
Kyle Attard	26		Psychotherapist	0	35	Evicted
Raisa Camilleri	28	Ħamrun	Entrepreneur & Baker,	0	28	Evicted
Donna Abela	24	Siġġiewi	TV Actor	0	21	Evicted
Matthias Attard	30	Rabat	Welder	0	14	Evicted
Dwayne Sammut	25	Luqa	Content creator	0	7	Evicted

== Nominations table ==
	Week 1	Week 2	Week 3	Week 4	Week 5	Week 6	Week 7	Week 8	Week 9		Week 10	Week 11	Week 12			
	Week 1	Week 2	Week 3	Week 4	Week 5	Week 6	Week 7	Week 8	Day 56	Day 61	Week 10	Week 11	Day 77	Day 81	Final	
Head(s) of Household	Raisa	Marvic	~~Karl~~; Chanelle	Jay; Karll	~~Chanelle~~; Erika	Gabriel	Sean	Ira by 32% public vote	none	Erika	Jay	Gabriel	none			
Jay	Ira; Kyle	Ira; Karl	Ira; Erika	Ira; Erika	Marvic; Josline	Banned	Marvic; Karl	Karl; Marvic	No; Nominations	Marvic; Karl	No; Nominations	Erika; Chanelle	No; Nominations	No; Nominations	Winner (Day 84)	
Karl	Dwayne; Matthias	Donna; Jay	Donna; Claire	Raisa; Kyle	Claire; Jay	Josline; Marvic	Chanelle; Jay; Chanelle	Josline; Marvic	No; Nominations	Sean; Jay	No; Nominations	Chanelle; Ira	Finalist		Runner-up (Day 84)	
Gabriel	Chanelle; Sean	Raisa; Sean	Donna; Jay	Raisa; Sean	Chanelle; Claire	Chanelle	Chanelle; Marvic	Sean; Ira	Evicted (Day 56)	Exempt	No; Nominations	Ira; Chanelle	No; Nominations	Finalist	Third place (Day 84)	
Chanelle	Dwayne; Matthias	Matthias; Gabriel	Gabriel; Claire	Erika; Marvic	Claire; Jay	Erika; Karl	Karl; Gabriel	Evicted (Day 49)		Exempt	No; Nominations	Erika; Jay	No; Nominations	No; Nominations	Re-Evicted (Day 81)	
Ira	Dwayne; Jay	Jay; Matthias	Jay; Donna	Erika; Raisa	Claire; Jay	Banned	Jay; Gabriel	Marvic; Erika	No; Nominations	Marvic; Josline	No; Nominations	Erika; Jay	No; Nominations	Evicted (Day 81)		
Erika	Dwayne; Gabriel	Donna; Ira	Raisa; Claire	Raisa; Claire	Jay; Claire	Claire; Ira	Ira; Josline	Josline; Ira	No; Nominations	Ira; Josline	Public nominee	Ira; Chanelle	Evicted (Day 77)			
Sean	Dwayne; Matthias	Matthias; Gabriel	Kyle; Gabriel	Gabriel; Marvic	Claire; Jay; Kyle	Karl; Marvic	Gabriel; Karl	Karl; Marvic	No; Nominations	Marvic; Karl	Public nominee	Evicted (Day 70)				
Marvic	Claire; Kyle	Sean; Claire; Sean	Sean; Jay	Raisa; Claire	Jay; Claire	Claire; Jay	Jay; Gabriel	Sean; Jay	No; Nominations	Josline; Ira	Walked (Day 69)					
Josline	Erika; Matthias	Matthias; Jay	Jay; Raisa	Kyle; Claire	Jay; Claire	Jay; Claire	Jay; Gabriel	Jay; Erika	No; Nominations	Karl; Marvic	Evicted (Day 63)					
Claire	Karl; Marvic	Gabriel; Karl	Gabriel; Donna	Marvic; Gabriel	Marvic; Sean	Karl; Erika	Evicted (Day 42)									
Kyle	Gabriel; Marvic	Matthias; Erika	Erika; Jay	Marvic; Gabriel	Marvic; Josline	Evicted (Day 35)										
Raisa	Erika; Matthias	Erika; Gabriel	Gabriel; Donna	Gabriel; Ira	Evicted (Day 28)											
Donna	Erika; Matthias	Erika; Matthias	Ira; Erika	Evicted (Day 21)												
Matthias	Karl; Sean	Sean; Karl	Evicted (Day 14)													
Dwayne	Erika; Ira	Evicted (Day 7)														
Notes	1	2	3, 4	5	6	7	8	9	10		11	12	13			
Public nominations	none	none						Gabriel	none		Erika; Sean	none				
Nominated	none	Erika; Gabriel; Sean; Matthias	none	Claire; Erika; Gabriel; Marvic; Raisa	Claire; Ira; Jay; Kyle; Marvic	Chanelle; Claire; Gabriel; Marvic	Chanelle; Erika; Gabriel; Jay	Gabriel; Jay; Marvic; Sean	none	Josline; Karl; Marvic	none					
Saved & replace	none	Erika	none	Marvic; Claire	Marvic	none	Jay	Sean	none	Karl	none					
Against public vote	Dwayne; Matthias	Gabriel; Sean; Matthias	Donna; Gabriel; Jay; Karl; Marvic	Gabriel; Sean; Erika; Ira; Raisa	Claire; Ira; Jay; Kyle	Chanelle; Claire; Marvic; Gabriel	Chanelle; Gabriel; Erika	Gabriel; Jay; Marvic	Chanelle; Claire; Donna; Dwayne; Gabriel; Kyle; Matthias; Raisa	Josline; Marvic	Erika; Sean	Chanelle; Erika; Ira	Chanelle; Gabriel; Ira; Jay	Chanelle; Jay	Gabriel; Jay; Karl	
Walked	none										Marvic	none				
Evicted	Dwayne; Most votes to evict	Matthias; Most votes to evict	Donna; 56% to evict	Raisa; 61% to evict	Kyle; Most votes to evict	Claire; Most votes to evict	Chanelle; Most votes to evict	Gabriel; Most votes to evict	Chanelle; 40.9% to re-enter	Josline; Most votes to evict	Sean; Most votes to evict	Erika; Most votes to evict	Ira; Most votes to evict	Chanelle; Most votes to evict	Gabriel; Fewest votes to win	Karl; Fewest votes to win
Evicted	Dwayne; Most votes to evict	Matthias; Most votes to evict	Donna; 56% to evict	Raisa; 61% to evict	Kyle; Most votes to evict	Claire; Most votes to evict	Chanelle; Most votes to evict	Gabriel; Most votes to evict	Gabriel; 39.5% to re-enter	Josline; Most votes to evict	Sean; Most votes to evict	Erika; Most votes to evict	Ira; Most votes to evict	Chanelle; Most votes to evict	Gabriel; Fewest votes to win	Karl; Fewest votes to win
Saved	Matthias; Fewest votes	Gabriel; Sean; Fewest votes	Gabriel; Jay; Karl; Marvic; 44%	Ira; 22% Erika; 10% Sean; 4% Gabriel; 3%	Claire; Ira; Jay; Fewest votes	Chanelle; Marvic; Gabriel; Fewest votes	Gabriel; Erika; Fewest votes	Jay; Marvic; Fewest votes	Raisa; 6.3% Dwayne; 5.4% Donna; 4.5% Kyle; 2.1% Matthias; 0.8% Claire; 0.5% to re-enter	Marvic; Fewest votes	Erika; Fewest votes	Chanelle; Ira; Fewest votes	Chanelle; Gabriel; Jay; Fewest votes	Jay; Fewest votes	Jay; Most votes to win	

=== Notes ===
- ^Note 1: Raisa became the first Head of Household of the season. Her victory granted her immunity from the first eviction. Dwayne and Matthias received the most nominations from the other housemates and faced the public vote, with Dwayne subsequently evicted.
- ^Note 2: Marvic became Head of Household in Week 2. Matthias, Erika, Sean and Gabriel were nominated, and Marvic was given the power to save one of Erika, Sean or Gabriel. He chose Erika, leaving Gabriel, Matthias and Sean faced the public vote.
- ^Note 3: Karl initially won the Week 3 Head of Household competition. However, he and Marvic were later punished after discussing nominations together, and both were nominated for eviction. The housemates then selected Chanelle as the new Head of Household.
- ^Note 4: Donna was punished during Week 3 for using swear words. The housemates were given a choice between sending her to the public vote or accepting a €10,000 reduction to the season's prize fund; they chose to send Donna to the public vote, where she was subsequently evicted.
- ^Note 5: Jay and Karl were Week 4's Heads of Household. Each had the power to save one housemate from the eviction. Karl saved Marvic, while Jay chose to save Claire; Raisa was subsequently evicted by the public.
- ^Note 6: Chanelle initially won the Week 5 Head of Household competition. Later she lost the title after speaking to Josline in bed without wearing her microphone. Erika, who had finished second in the competition, became Head of Household and received immunity from that week's eviction.
- ^Note 7: During Week 6, Gabriel became Head of Household and was required to nominate a housemate for the public vote. He nominated Chanelle, but after misunderstanding Big Brother's instructions, Gabriel was also sent to the public vote. Marvic was later fast-tracked to the public vote after breaking a house rule. Claire was ultimately evicted.
- ^Note 8: Sean's dog Duda Rose initially held the Head of Household position at the start of Week 7, but a surprise call from Big Brother transferred the position to Sean. Karl was given a special opportunity to watch the other housemates' nominations, giving him additional influence over the nomination process. Sean saved Jay from nominations, while Karl used his special nomination power to nominate Chanelle directly for the public vote. Chanelle joined Gabriel and Erika as the three housemates facing the public vote and was ultimately evicted.
- ^Note 9: Ira became Head of Household in Week 8 after winning the first public Head of Household vote with 32% of the vote. Her identity as Head of Household was kept secret from the other housemates. The public also participated directly in the nomination process; Gabriel received the highest number of public nomination votes and joined Jay and Marvic as the nominees for eviction.
- ^Note 10: Week 9 began with a public vote among eight previously evicted housemates to determine which two would return to the house. Chanelle and Gabriel received the two highest shares of the vote, 40.9% and 39.5%, respectively, and returned to the competition. The subsequent nomination round was headed by Erika, with Karl and Marvic were nominated.
- ^Note 11: Week 10 used public nominations. Erika and Sean received the most public nomination votes therefore faced the public vote for eviction. Marvic left the house voluntarily after expressing his desire to leave.
- ^Note 12: Gabriel was Head of Household in Week 11 and Karl became the first finalist of Big Brother Malta. The week also introduced face-to-face nominations, with Erika, Ira and Chanelle ultimately facing the public vote.
- ^Note 13: The semifinal was conducted in two consecutive eviction rounds. In the first round, Chanelle, Gabriel and Jay were nominated and Ira was evicted. In the second round, Jay and Chanelle were nominated, with Chanelle evicted. The three remaining housemates, Jay, Karl and Gabriel, advanced to the final, where the public voted for the winner.
