= Shaparak =

Shaparak may refer to:

== Given name ==
- Shaparak Khorsandi (born 1973), Iranian-born British comedian
- Shaparak Shajarizadeh (born 1975), Iranian women's rights activist

== Other ==
- Shaparak (company)
