= Supreme Council of ICT of Iran =

The main council in Iran for ICT affairs

SCICT is the main council in Iran for ICT affairs. SCICT is managed by Nasrollah Jahangard.

The first form of ICT in Iran was the fax in 1988, and then the computer. Now Iran itself develops ICT. Iranian universities are connected to a gigabit ethernet backbone. Computers have not yet reached all people in Iran. As of 2005, most of the Internet connections are dial-up, but faster ADSL connections are becoming more popular.

== See also ==
- Takfa
- Communications in Iran
- Virastyar
