= ERMC =

ERMC may refer to:

- Eastern Region Ministry Course
- ERMC (cable system)
