= Big Brother Malta =

Maltese version of the Big Brother television series

- The Big Brother Malta logo
- Genre: Reality competition
- Based on: Big Brother by John de Mol Jr.
- Presented by: Ryan Borg; Josmar Gatt
- Country of origin: Malta
- Original languages: Maltese, English
- No. of series: 2

Production
- Production companies: Banijay Entertainment greatt

Original release
- Network: TVM; TVM+ GOPlus
- Release: 19 January 2025 – present

Related
- Big Brother (franchise)

Big Brother Malta is the Maltese version of the international reality television franchise Big Brother. The show is broadcast on TVM. In June 2024, Banijay Rights announced a deal with PBS-owned TVM to bring the format to Malta, with the Maltese version described as the 70th international adaptation of Big Brother.

The show was scheduled to launch in January 2025. Casting for the first season was opened in 2024 with producers calling for applicants from across Malta and Gozo to become the first housemates of the Maltese version. The first season was advertised with a €50,000 prize fund. The first season premiered on 19 January 2025 and concluded on 13 April 2025, with Jay Vella becoming the first winner of the Maltese version.

The second season was put into development following the first season, with applications for new housemates opening on 13 April 2025, the finale day of the first season.

== Format ==
Big Brother Malta follows the format of the international Big Brother franchise. The housemates live together in a specially constructed house under continuous surveillance and are isolated from the outside world. They participate in tasks and activities organised by Big Brother, while nominations and public voting determine the evictions. The last remaining housemate is declared the winner.

The first season featured 15 housemates.

== Broadcast ==
The first season premiered on 19 January 2025 and was broadcast daily on TVM and TVM+. In addition to the televised episodes, the production offered continuous live coverage. A live stream was made available through TVMi, while GOPlus provided 24-hour coverage of the house.

The first season was hosted by Ryan Borg and Josmar Gatt, who were announced as the presenters in January 2025.

== Series overview ==
| Series | Host(s) | Episodes | Originally released | | | Days | Housemates | Winner | Runner-up |
| Series | Host(s) | Episodes | First released | Last released | Network | Days | Housemates | Winner | Runner-up |
|---|---|---|---|---|---|---|---|---|---|
| 1 | Ryan Borg; Josmar Gatt | 85 | 19 January 2025 | 13 April 2025 | TVM | 85 | 15 | Jay Vella | Karl Bonnici |
| 2 | Ryan Borg; Josmar Gatt | TBA | 2027 | 2027 | TVM | TBA | TBA | TBA | TBA |
