= Nasrollah Jahangard =

Iranian politician

- نصرالله جهانگرد
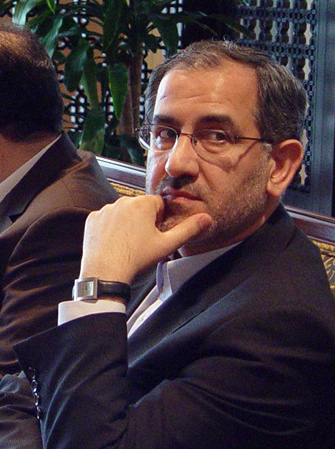
- Nasrollah Jahangard

Minister of Post, Telegraph and Telephone Acting
- In office July 2000 – September 2000
- President: Mohammad Khatami
- Preceded by: Mohammad Reza Aref
- Succeeded by: Abdollah Mirtaheri (acting)

Personal details
- Born: 14 February 1958 (age 68) Tehran, Iran
- Party: Islamic Iran Participation Front
- Education: Shahid Beheshti University; Amirkabir University of Technology

Nasrollah Jahangard (Persian: نصرالله جهانگرد, born 1958) is an Iranian politician and former deputy minister of ICT in Technology and Innovation.

In October 2000, Jahangard was nominated for Minister of Post, Telegraph and Telephone but legislators turned him down.

Back in 1997, he had been the Deputy Minister of Post, Telegraph & Telephone (PTT) for Development & Planning, which the ministry later renamed to Ministry of Communications and Information Technology. Also, He was the secretary of the Supreme Council of ICT of Iran and President Mohammad Khatami's advisor and special envoy for ICT affairs. He is a founding member of the Islamic Iran Participation Front and is a member of its political office.

He led the team for planning and implementing Takfa (similar to a "national ICT agenda" in some other countries), the first Iranian comprehensive countrywide plan for ICT. He received his bachelor's degree in computer engineering from Shahid Beheshti University and from Amirkabir University of Technology; he earned his master's degree in system engineering.

Jahangard was among the leaders of the National Commission of Information Society and helped the Iranian delegation to take part in World Summit on the Information Society (WSIS) (Geneva 2003 and Tunis 2005).

He was elected the Man of IT in Iran in March 2005 by CCW Magazine.
