= Yooz =

Iranian search engine

Yooz.ir (in Persian: یوز lit. Cheetah) was an Iranian web search engine. Iran's Ministry of Communication and IT claimed the search engine is capable of supporting up to one billion Persian websites and it has currently indexed over 1 billion web pages. Yooz search engine had 100,000 hits and more than 60,000 searchers per day.

== See also ==
- Communications in Iran
