= 2008 submarine cable disruption =

International internet disruptions

1. 23 Jan - FALCON cable near Bandar Abbas, Iran
2. 30 Jan - SEA-ME-WE-4 near Alexandria
3. 30 Jan - FLAG cable near Alexandria
4. 1 Feb - FALCON cable between Muscat and Dubai, UAE
5. 3 Feb - DOHA-HALOUL between Qatar and UAE
6. 4 Feb - SEA-ME-WE-4 near Penang, Malaysia

The 2008 submarine cable disruption refers to three separate incidents of major damage to submarine optical communication cables around the world. The first incident caused damage involving up to five high-speed Internet submarine communications cables in the Mediterranean Sea and Middle East from January 23 to February 4, 2008, causing internet disruptions and slowdowns for users in the Middle East and India. The incident called into doubt the safety of the undersea portion of the Internet cable system.

In late February, there was another outage, this time affecting a fiber optic connection between Singapore and Jakarta.

On December 19, FLAG FEA, GO-1, SEA-ME-WE 3, and SEA-ME-WE 4 were all cut.

== Cables damaged ==
=== 23 January ===
Although it was not reported at the time, there was a cut off of FALCON on 23 January. The FALCON cable system connects several countries in the Persian Gulf and India.

=== 30 January ===
On 30 January 2008, news agencies reported Internet services were widely disrupted in the Middle East and in the Indian subcontinent following damage to the SEA-ME-WE 4 and FLAG Telecom cables in the Mediterranean Sea. The damage to the two systems occurred separately several kilometers apart near Alexandria.

While the respective contributions of the two cable systems to this blackout is unclear, network outage graphs show anomalies at 0430 UTC and again at 0800 UTC. The cause of the damage to SEA-ME-WE 4 or FLAG has not been declared by either cable operator. A number of sources speculated these were caused by a dragging ship anchor near Alexandria. The Egyptian Maritime Transport Ministry reviewed one day of complete video footage beginning 12 hours before and through 12 hours after the service disruption, concluding the cause of damage was not surface craft as no ships were traced sailing through the area of the alleged wire damage. The Kuwaitis also do not directly charge seafaring vessels, instead referring to "weather conditions and maritime traffic." The Economist reported that an earthquake may have caused the cable to fault.

==== Effects ====
Disruptions of 70 percent in Egypt and 60 percent in India were reported, along with problems in Afghanistan-AWCC, Bahrain, Bangladesh, Kuwait, Maldives, Pakistan, Qatar, Saudi Arabia and United Arab Emirates.

1.7 million Internet users in the UAE were affected by the Internet disruption. Mahesh Jaishanker, an executive director for Du, said, “The submarine cable cuts in FLAG Europe-Asia cable 8.3 km away from Alexandria, Egypt and SEA-ME-WE 4 affected at least 60 million users in India, 12 million in Pakistan, six million in Egypt and 4.7 million in Saudi Arabia.” A router for a university in Tehran was not responding, causing some reports of a total loss of connectivity for Iran. However, the Iranian embassy in Abu Dhabi reported that "everything was fine." Additional reports and analysis showed that while Iran was affected, it "fared much better" than many other countries in the same geographic area.

On 1 February 2008, VSNL, a leading communications solutions provider in India, confirmed that the company restored a majority of its IP connectivity into the MENA region within 24 hours of the Egypt cable breakdown. Services were largely restored within 24 hours of the cable cut by diverting traffic through the TIC and SEA-ME-WE 3 cables.

=== 1 February ===
Two days after the initial break, it was reported that the FALCON cable was cut between Muscat, Oman and Dubai, UAE. This cut was between different landing points than the 23 January cut, FLAG Telecom issued a press release later, stating the "FALCON cable is reported cut at 0559 hrs GMT on 1 February 2008. Location of cut is at 56 km from Dubai, UAE on segment between UAE and Oman". This cut was caused by an abandoned anchor weighing 5-6 tonnes.

=== 3 February ===
On 3 February 2008, Qtel reported that a cable called DOHA-HALOUL connecting Qatar to the United Arab Emirates had been damaged, causing disruptions in already damaged Middle Eastern communication networks. It became the fourth cable to be damaged in 5 days. The location of the break was between the Qatari island of Haloul and the UAE island of Das. The problem was said to be related to the power system.

=== 4 February ===
On 4 February 2008 the Khaleej Times reported that SEA-ME-WE 4 had also been damaged at another location, near Penang, Malaysia. The date of this damage was not given.

=== 19 December ===
On 19 December 2008 France Telecom issued a press release stating that the FLAG Telecom, SEA-ME-WE 4, and SEA-ME-WE 3 cables, linking Alexandria, Egypt, Sicily, and Malta, had been cut by either bad weather conditions or a ship's anchor, resulting in substantial slowdowns in communication traffic, with Egypt experiencing an overall 80% reduction in Internet capacity. France Telecom expects SEA-ME-WE 4 will be repaired first, then SEA-ME-WE 3, then FLAG, and that repairs should be concluded by 31 December. The break disrupted 75% of communication between the Middle East and Asia and the rest of the world. The breaks caused companies including Vodafone, Verizon Communications, Portugal Telecom, GO and France Telecom to experience disruption in their systems and forced them to reroute communications through different means. Others, such as AT&T, also received reports of service disruption. The rerouting of these communications caused large slowdowns in some areas. Interoute director Jonathan Wright stated that "You can reroute the data through other cables, but that increases traffic and can potentially create bottlenecks, so Internet connections may slow down and some phone calls could get disrupted." The GO-1 cable connecting Malta and Sicily was also cut.

== Cause of cable breaks ==
=== Anchors ===
These disruptions are attributed by some officials to accidents involving ships' anchors, but reviews of surveillance footage of the area by Egyptian authorities revealed no ships in the area. However, FLAG Telecom indicated that the cut to the Falcon cable between the United Arab Emirates and Oman was caused by an abandoned anchor weighing five to six tons.

In mid April two ships were impounded in connection with the FLAG Telecom outages near Dubai. They were charged with improperly dropping anchor in the area of the cuts.

The 19 December breaks were reported to be caused either by bad weather or a ship's anchor, though the bad weather was just a possibility and the anchor a much more likely occurrence.

=== Common occurrence ===
According to Stephen Beckert, a senior analyst at TeleGeography, the events are far less exceptional than they seem because cable cuts happen all the time. Beckert argues that "only the first two cuts had any serious impact on the Internet," and this drew public attention to other cable cuts that would not normally have been newsworthy. According to Beckert, cable cuts happen "on average once every three days." He further noted that there are 25 large ships that do nothing but fix cable cuts and bends, and that such cuts are usually the result of cables rubbing against rocks on the sea floor.

According to Global Marine Systems, "Undersea cable damage is hardly rare—indeed, more than 50 repair operations were mounted in the Atlantic alone last year". While a cut in a cable crossing the Atlantic has "no significant effect" due to the many alternate cables, only a handful of Internet cables serve the Middle East. These disruptions are only noticeable because of the small number of cables.

== Conspiracy theories ==
Since Israel and Iraq were not affected by the communications blackout, conspiracy theories have begun to spread throughout the Internet.

On 6 February, theories that the disruption in these cables was related to an economic confrontation between the United States and Iran appeared in an opinion piece on Dow Jones Marketwatch. This article points out that the disruption or damage to these cables preceded the intended launch of the Iranian oil bourse on Kish Island between 1 and 11 February. The launch of this bourse, which was intended to broker sales of oil denominated in euros (sometimes called "petroeuros") had been interpreted by some as an attempt by Iran to inflict additional damage to the value of the dollar by reducing the volume of oil which is traded in "petrodollars". Given the potential economic damage of euro-denominated oil sales in the context of on-going dollar inflation, as well as the large number of cables which appear to have been disrupted or damaged, Marketwatch's John Dvorak has written that the U.S. can expect to be blamed for the disruptions.

According to this sabotage theory, the damaged cables and the resulting Internet disruptions would destroy confidence in the ability of the Iranian Oil Bourse to execute trades, thereby thwarting the establishment of an alternative to dollar-denominated oil sales. In fact, Iran suffered very little from the outages, which primarily affected America's allies in the region (see 'Effects' above). Bloggers have also suggested that the cable disruptions were a cover for NSA installing taps on the lines for eavesdropping.

On Monday, 18 February, the International Telecommunication Union said that the damage could have been an act of sabotage. The UN agency's head of development, Sami al-Murshed was quoted, "We do not want to preempt the results of ongoing investigations, but we do not rule out that a deliberate act of sabotage caused the damage to the undersea cables over two weeks ago." This was subsequently shown false, as on April 18, two ships parked in a restricted area during a storm, cutting the cables with their anchors. One sailor from each vessel was detained, as were both vessels. The vessels were subsequently released after restitution for the damaged cables was secured.

== See also ==
- 2011 submarine cable disruption
- 2024 Baltic Sea submarine cable disruptions
