= Parsijoo =

Persian search engine

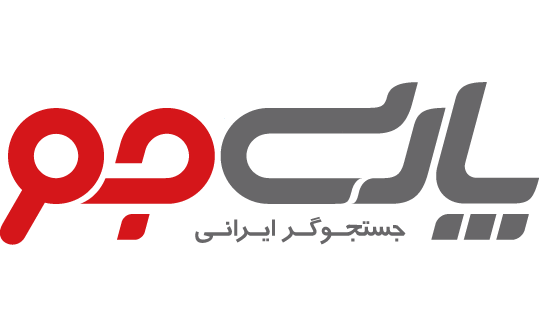
- Website type: Search engine
- Founded: May 18, 2010; 16 years ago
- Website: www.parsijoo.ir
- Current status: Defunct

Parsijoo (Persian: پارسی‌جو, Parsiju) was an independent knowledge-base Internet company, operating as a search engine for the Persian language. As of 2016, Parsijoo had 600,000 hits and 120,000 searches per day. Parsijoo was Iran's second most visited search engine after Google. As of October 2022, the service is defunct.

== History ==
The study phase of the project was started in 2001 and the first version of Parsijoo was released on the web in 2010 with only one service: web search. It now offers various online services currently running on its fifth edition (including image, music and news service). Parsijoo's design is primarily based on the Persian language and culture.

Each service has its own purpose to help users find what they are looking for in the vast amount of information available on the Web.

== Services ==
- Web - Quick and precise search among the Persian pages.
- Image
- Video
- Ava - search through songs, music tracks and audio files, and play and download directly
- News - The most intelligent Iranian news search service that has crawled the news pages of more than 60 news websites and provides the news to users with categorization and intelligent grouping.
- Market - The market service has crawled various products from more than 20 online shopping reputable websites, and provide the product specifications (price, inventory, features), as well as the final purchase page to the user directly through a search.
- Map - Parsijoo map service is known as the first and most specialized native map service in Iran. Parsijoo map service has important features such as wide coverage, precise details, drawing capabilities, editing, location registration (add a place), unique cartography, several information layers and multiple updates at short intervals. There are currently about 650 cities of Iran with 80% coverage with more than 530 information layers.
- Download -Download service has crawled a number of different downloaded files (software, Android apps, books, movies, animation, etc.) from more than 20 respected and recognized download websites, and then provide the final files to the user directly through a search. The ability to categorize and group, as well as remove duplicates is in this service.
- Translate - Powered by Targoman translation system and translates the text or word in real time and online mode.
- Scholar

== Value added services (VAS) ==
- Weather
- Online employment - Employment service has crawled job postings from reputable websites and allows users to search and display the most relevant results.
- Prayer times
- Calendar
- Sport
- Price - the prices of some index items (e.g., currency, coins, stock exchange).

== Parsijoo Shakhes ==
Parsijoo Shakhes is the first and only analyst of Persian web pages. It provides quantitative and qualitative information on the status of Persian web pages on the Farsi web (e.g. Alexa).

Shakhes can display the number of crawled and indexed pages of a site, and then show the visibility mode of the site in Parsijoo search engine. Using Shakhes, will be able to observe the number (and name) of sites that have links to a website, the number of clicks made on the site and also website ratings.

== Customs services ==
Parsijoo provides some custom services for enterprises and developers, such as custom web search, enterprise search engine and map personalization management services (Location-Based).

=== Censorship ===
Parsijoo has been accused of censorship, which it has denied, claiming it is more private and uncensored than Google.

=== Parsijoo APIs ===
- Parsijoo Map API
- Parsijoo Weather API
- Parsijoo Price API

== Parsijoo advertising system ==
=== Parsijoo targeted advertising ===
Kids Games - Play Kids Games | Share-Games

== Parsijoo blog ==
The official Parsijoo blog was the closest link between users and Parsijoo. Users would be able to get the latest changes, services, new features, articles, technical comments, IT & search news, statistics, and other updates .

== Parsijoo mobile applications ==
According to the importance of mobile apps in users intelligent life, Parsijoo has done design and develop of three Android apps. Parsijoo offered three different Android apps has been welcomed by users.

- Parsijoo Mobile Application - search web, music (Ava), images, videos، news, download and market.
- Parsijoo Translate Application - translate texts.
- khabarjoo Application - search and view the news

== See also ==
- List of search engines
- Search engine
- Comparison of search engines
- Communications in Iran
- Yandex
