= Smash Television =

- Country: Malta
- Broadcast area: Malta
- Headquarters: Paola, Malta

Programming
- Languages: Maltese, English

Ownership
- Owner: Smash Communications

History
- Launched: 19 November 1994

Links
- Website: smashmalta.com

Availability

Terrestrial
- Free-to-air: 43 (UHF)
- GO: 105

Smash Television is a Maltese television station. Smash is privately owned and maintains a neutral editorial position in which different opinions on Maltese politics are expressed. It remains much smaller than the older stations.

== See also ==
- Television in Malta
