= Just-in-time blocking =

Just-in-time blocking is the practice of temporarily blocking internet access for people in a specific geographic area, to prevent them from accessing information or communicating with each other.

The first known instance of just-in-time blocking was documented by the OpenNet Initiative during the 2005 Kyrgyz parliamentary elections. It's also been observed during the 2006 Belarus presidential elections, the 2006 Tajik presidential elections, and is alleged to have taken place in Bahrain, Uganda, and Yemen, during their 2006 presidential and parliamentary elections. In 2016, internet watchdog organization Turkey Blocks identified two separate regional internet shutdowns commencing prior to the arrests of mayors in predominantly Kurdish southeast of Turkey, a measure believed to have been implemented by the government to prevent protests and limit critical media coverage.

In the two-week period leading up to the 2013 Iranian presidential elections, anti-censorship groups Herdict and ASL19 found access to popular websites such as Facebook, Meyar News, Twitter, the BBC and YouTube was intermittently blocked in Iran. Mohammad Hassan Nami, then Iran's Minister of Communications and Information Technology, told Tasnim News Agency that the restrictions were part of “security measures taken to preserve calm in the country during the election period."
