= One Productions =

Radio company of Malta

Coordinates: 35°52′15″N 14°29′40″E

One Productions Limited (One Group)
- Formerly: Super One Productions; Rainbow Productions
- Company type: Private
- Industry: Mass media, telecommunications
- Headquarters: Marsa, Malta
- Area served: Malta
- Owner: Labour Party

One Productions Limited, also known as the One Group, is a Maltese mass media and telecommunications company owned by the Labour Party.

Its operations include the television station One, radio service One Radio, and previously operated the DAB+ radio service KISS, and mobile virtual network operator Redtouch Fone.
