= I2i =

Telecommunications cable

i2i
- Owners: Bharti Airtel
- Landing points Chennai, India; Tuas, Singapore
- Total length: 3,200 km
- Design capacity: 8.4 Tbit/s
- Technology: DWDM
- Date of first use: 2002

i2i is a submarine telecommunications cable connecting Chennai, India, and Tuas, Singapore. It was completed in April 2002 and is fully owned by Bharti Airtel after Singtel divested its interest in 2007.

The cable consists of 8 fiber pairs with a full capacity of 8.4 Tbit/s. The cable is connected with a terrestrial link between Chennai and Mumbai (2,000 kilometres (1,200 mi)). It also connects with C2C Cable network, SEA-ME-WE 3 and Asia Pacific Cable Network.
