= Tapsi (ridehailing) =

Iranian ridesharing company

- Industry: Carpool
- Founded: 2016
- Area served: Iran
- Website: tapsi.irof

Tapsi (Stylized TAPSI, Former Tap30, Persian: تپسی) is an Iranian ridesharing company and cross platform application for carpooling.

It works in 15 of Iranian cities. The mobile app is released for iOS and Android, HarmonyOS.

The app was hacked in 2023, 34 million people's user data was breached, then sold via Telegram for $35000.

== Application features ==
- Ride cost calculator
- Rating driver and ride
- Travel security feature

=== Service ===
- Classic
- Carpool
- Calling in for ordering ride
- Delivery
- Ride accessibility for disabled people
- Hailing taxicab

== History ==
=== Rebrand ===
In 2019 the company changed logo.

== Lawsuit ==
Tapsi sued Snapp in an antitrust case but was dismissed by the council of competition.
