= Takfa =

Tafka (by its initials in Persian) is the first complete and countrywide plan for ICT (Information and Communications Technology) in Iran, the equivalent of a "National ICT agenda (NICTA)" in some other countries. It is planned and implemented by an expert team, led by Nasrollah Jahangard in 2002.

NICTA required all government bodies and state organisations to employ IT effectively in their day-to-day operations. Subsequently, the name of Ministry of Post, Telegraph and Telephone was also changed to the Ministry of ICT to suit its envisaged role of pioneering the implementation of modern technology in this sector. Initially, NICTA managed to stimulate some major projects in the sector. However, after the 2003 presidential elections, NICTA effectively fell apart, and failed to change the ICT landscape of Iran significantly.

== See also ==
- Communications in Iran
