= 2011 submarine cable disruption =

2011 submarine cable disruption refers to two incidents of submarine communications cables cut off on 25 December 2011. The first cut off occurred to SEA-ME-WE 3 at Suez Canal, Egypt and the second cut off occurred to i2i which took place between Chennai, India and Singapore line. SEA-ME-WE 3 is the longest datacable on earth of 39,000 kilometres (24,000 mi) length, which links South-East Asia to Western Europe through the Red Sea. Both the incidents had caused the internet disruptions and slowdowns for users in the South Asia and Middle East in particular UAE.

== See also ==
- 2008 submarine cable disruption
- 2024 Baltic Sea submarine cable disruptions
