= Digikala =

Iranian e-commerce company

- Type: Private
- Industry: E-commerce
- Founded: 1 July 2006; 20 years ago
- Founders: Hamid and Saeed Mohammadi
- Headquarters: Tehran, Iran
- Area served: Iran
- Number of employees: 8,200 (2021)
- Website: digikala.com

Digikala (Persian: دیجی‌کالا, romanized: Dijikalâ, lit. 'digi(tal) goods') is an Iranian e-commerce company based in Tehran, founded in July 2006 by Hamid Mohammadi and Saeid Mohammadi.

Digikala offers a wide range of consumer products, which includes sports and entertainment goods, electronics, groceries, personal products, and digital products with a return option and express delivery service. The group also has subsidiaries involved in other areas of ecommerce.

== History and growth ==
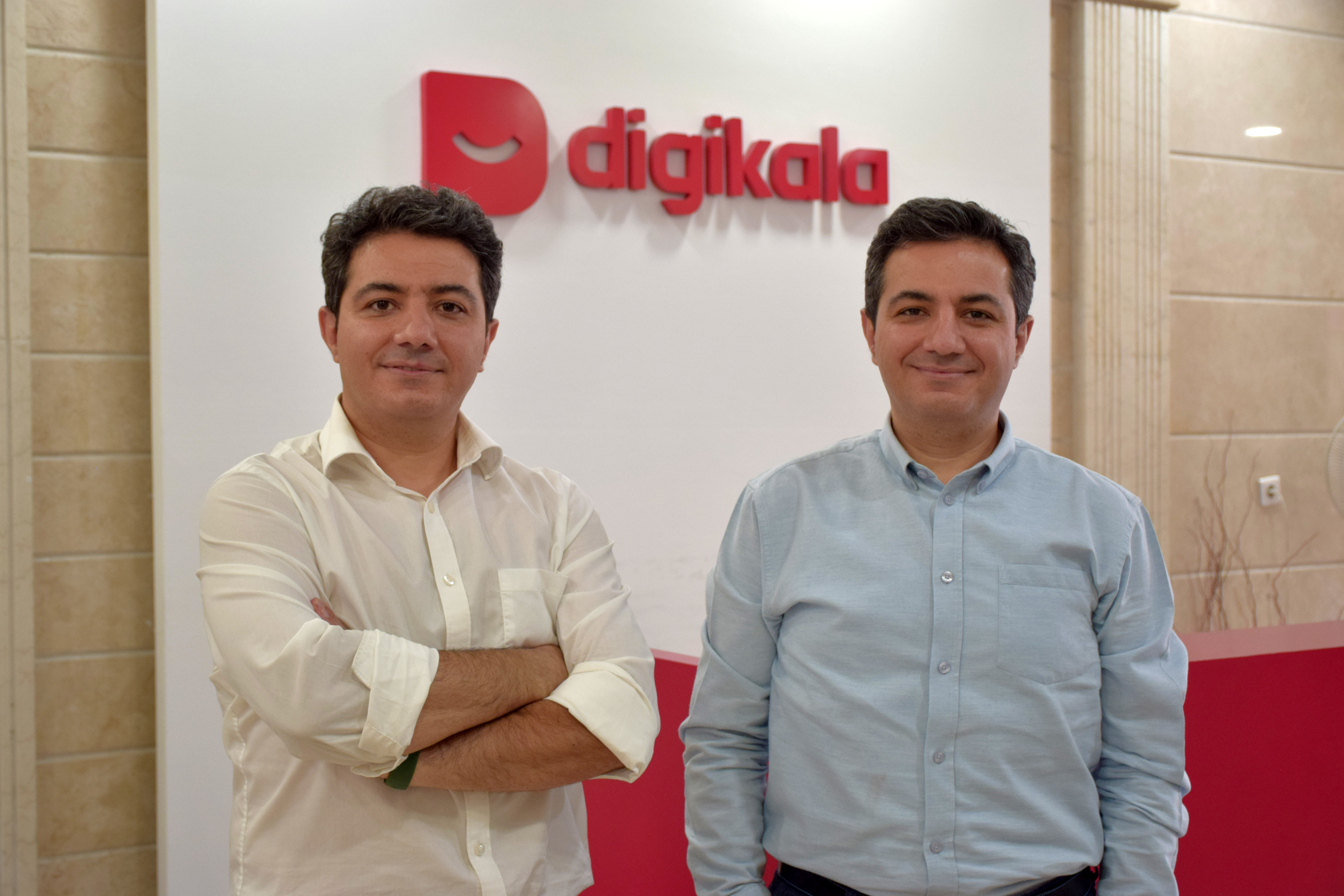
Hamid Mohammadi and Saeed Mohammadi, co-founders of Digikala

Digikala was founded by the brothers Hamid and Saeid Mohammadi, prompted by an unpleasant experience they had trying to buy a digital camera. The pair used $10,000 of their own savings to start the company. The company's valuation was $150 million in 2014 and $500 million in late 2015. As of 2021, more than 4 million products have been offered for sale by nearly 160,000 sellers. In 2021, the platform had 30 million visitors per month and 17.2 million visits per day. In May 2022 it was ranked as Iran's 2nd most visited website.

Digikala has benefited from the Iran's increasing digitization. By 2017, 62% of Iran's households were connected to the Internet and this development has driven demand for Internet services that mirror Western digital platforms. The company does not publicize its revenue, but has said sales are growing at a rate of 200% a year, and that it is receiving orders from even the most remote villages in Iran.

Iran's economic volatility forced Digikala to lay off 175 workers in 2018. To survive, the platform adopted several initiatives such as a pay-per-sale strategy which allow users to receive a commission if a directed customer purchases a product. In March 2019, Digikala also addressed the issue of author authenticity of products in the platform after receiving complaints over the quality of goods being sold. In a statement, the company claimed that only 0.2% of the 2 million products sold were unoriginal and that the company has taken steps to implement stringent quality control.

== Shareholders ==
The ownership structure of Digikala e-commerce group was publicly the CEO of Digikala. Accordingly, 33.12% of the company's shares belong to Hamid and Saeed Mohammadi, the co-founders of Digikala, followed by IIIC European Investment Fund with 32.67%, Sarava Pars Company with 25.64%, incentive shares for managers and key employees with 4.46%, and other shareholder companies with 11.4%, including Lilian Mod Tejarat, Bazar Ati Ara, Pomegranate Investment AB, Kia Asa Tejarat Toos, and Pars Gostar Dina.

== Number of employees ==
In 2022, Digikala planned to increase its number of associates to 10,000. As of 2021, Digikala employs more than 8,000 people.

== Products and services ==
Digikala initially started as an online retail platform focused on digital and electronic products. Since 2014, Digikala expanded its strategy to become an online marketplace, offering a wider range of products.

== Subsidiaries ==
The Digikala Group is active in logistics, e-commerce, content, fintech, martech, and innovative fields. Digikala owns more than 10 subsidiaries, including Fidibo, Digistyle, Digipay, Pindo and Komoda.

=== Fidibo ===
Fidibo is a Persian e-book store that has been operating since March 2014. Digikala bought an interest in the company in 2016 and became its main owner in 2017.

=== Digistyle ===
Digistyle, an online fashion and clothing store, was founded in 2016.

=== Digipay ===
Digipay was founded in 2018, focusing on mobile and web payments. Digipay services include Smart IPG, merchant management dashboard, mobile payment gateways, customer refund services, personal and organizational wallets, mobile payment applications, and installment purchase facilities.

=== Komoda ===
Komoda is a social buy-and-sell startup platform. It was founded in July 2018 and has been a Digikala group member since late 2019.

=== Pindo ===
In 2021, DigiKala launched Pindo, a platform for registering Consumer to Consumer advertisements.

=== Smartech ===
Smartech offers marketing technology services and was added to the Digikala group in 2019.

=== DigiExpress ===
DigiExpress provides online Logistics Services and was founded in 2019.

=== Digikala Jet ===
Launched in 2021, DigiKala Jet is a personalized online grocery shop in major cities like Tehran, Karaj, Mashhad, and Shiraz.

== See also ==
- List of companies of Iran
- Economy of Iran
