= Iran Software & Hardware Co. (NOSA) =

Iran Software & Hardware Company
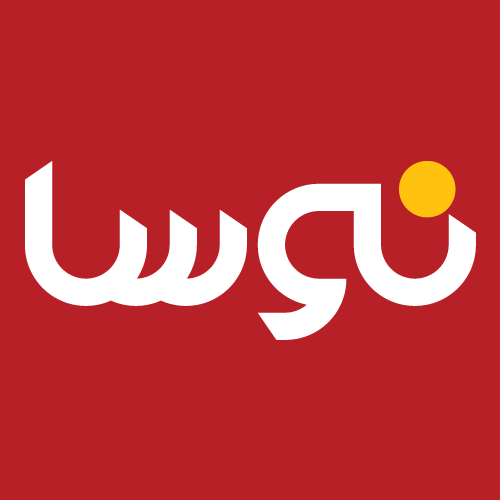
- Industry: Information Technology; Computer software RFID
- Founded: Tehran, Iran (1988)
- Headquarters: Tehran, Iran
- Area served: Middle East
- Key people: Ahmad Mohammad Zadeh (Chief Executive Officer); Mehrdad Momeni (Chief Software Architect); Bahram Najafi (Chief Technology Officer)
- Products: RFID Solutions; NOSA XP; Gift XP; NOSA Portal; Simorgh Portal; Simorgh; NOSA Viewer; NOSA Books; Ghaaf
- Number of employees: ~100 (2010)
- Website: www.nosa.com

Iran Software & Hardware Co. (NOSA) (Persian: شرکت نرم‌افزار و سخت‌افزار ایران (نوسا), Sherkat-e Narm-afezar va Sakht-afzare Iran (NOSA)) is an independently owned development and consulting corporation, which provides software applications and support to businesses of all sizes located in Iran. Since its founding in 1988, NOSA has engaged in the development and distribution of a range of integrated Business Software, ERP, MIS, BPMS, RFID, and Library Solution as well as related products designed to meet the needs of the public, private and not-for-profit organizations in the region.

== Simorgh ==
Iran Software & Hardware Company's digital information management package for companies and libraries. Simorgh is an n-tier program based on .NET framework. Simorgh uses three databases in order to effectively store information. The first server is an indigenous Database Management System built by NOSA that can efficiently support right to left and left to right text functionality and search options while storing document and book information. The second server is an SQL repository of all digital media files and documents with in document search engine. Simorgh's third server is also based on SQL and stores user and system information.

Simorgh is used in hundreds of libraries and companies around Iran, including Islamic Republic of Iran Broadcasting corporation's 52 countrywide databases, which are all now using a single server solution and online client accesses. Simorgh can link libraries and data sources to provide unified access through one portal. Simorgh can be used as a repository of digital documents and provide them to clients. The latest version of Simorgh incorporates radio-frequency identification, and was covered by news agencies including the Iranian News channel, the Iranian Technology news, and the Iranian Students News Agency.

== NOSA Books ==
With arising needs of scholars to use digital sources for research and the desire of publishers and libraries to safely share such copyrighted sources online, NOSA created NOSA Books. This Project uses an artificial intelligent cloud computing server called Brain Center to match available metadata and document information across all of Simorgh's network of 100+ libraries and intelligently match them with reference libraries such as Library of Congress, National Library of Medicine and National Library of Iran.

== See also ==
- Library 2.0
- Enterprise resource planning
- Database management system
- Radio frequency identification
