= One Radio =

Coordinates: 35°52′15″N 14°29′40″E

ONE Radio
Malta
- Frequency: 92.7 MHz

Ownership
- Owner: One Productions

History
- First air date: August 1991

Links
- Website: one.com.mt

One Radio (stylized as ONE Radio, previously known as Super One Radio) is a radio station in Malta owned by One Productions, the media arm of the Labour Party.

== ONE Radio's Initial Timeline ==
- Started operations in 1990
- Temporary transmissions started in May 1991
- First transmission in August 1991
- 24-hour transmission started in November 1991
