= One (Maltese TV channel) =

Maletese television channel

ONE
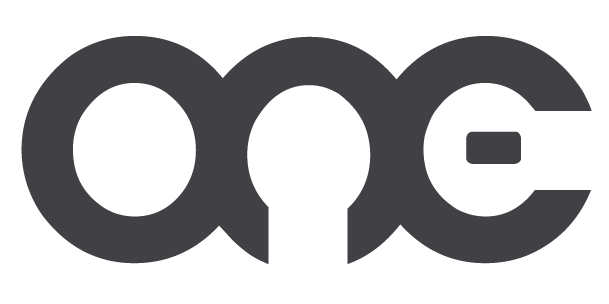
- Current ONE logo
- Country: Malta

Programming
- Language(s): Maltese
- Picture format: 576i, 1080i

Ownership
- Owner: One Productions (Labour Party)

History
- Launched: March 1994
- Former names: Super One Television

Links
- Website: one.com.mt

Availability

Terrestrial
- Free-to-air: 43 (UHF)
- GO: 103
- Melita: 103

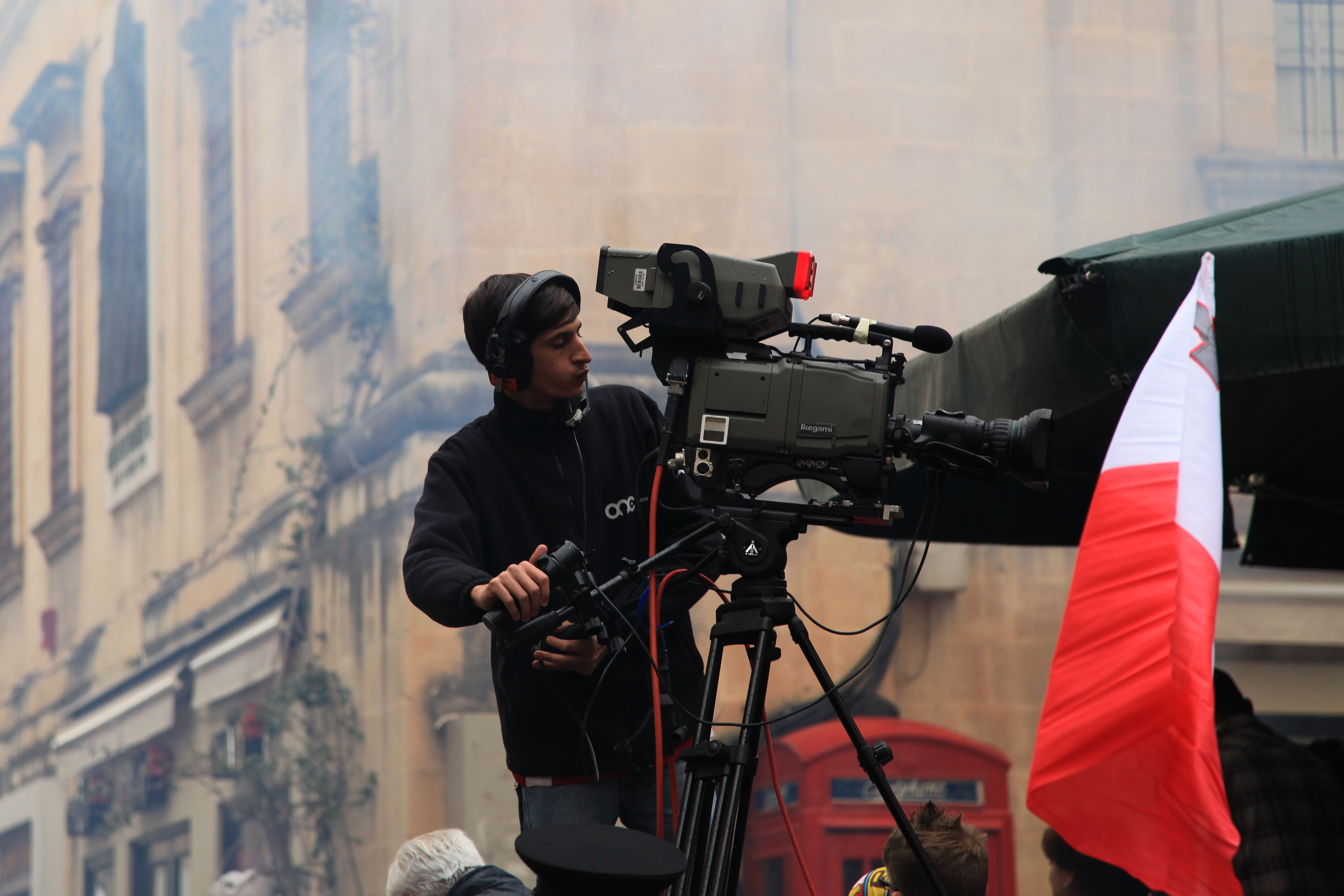
A One TV cameraman during the celebrations after the 2013 elections in Republic Street, Valletta.

One TV (stylized as ONE and previously known as Super One Television) is a television station in Malta owned by One Productions, the Labour Party's media arm. Broadcasts commenced in March 1994.

== Studios ==
The station is administered and broadcasts from its studios in Marsa. At the time of launch, one of its key personalities was Norman Hamilton, who previously was with Xandir Malta until 1988.

The station also has an Outside Broadcasting Unit, which it first used during the Malta Labour Party's May Day celebrations on 1 May 1997.

One TV also won the first two editions of the Television Station of the year awards in 2006 & 2007.
