= System Group =

System Group (همكاران سيستم)
- Type: Public
- Industry: Enterprise software
- Founded: Tehran, Iran (1987)
- Founder: Mahmoud Nazzari, Shahriar Rahimi, Homayoon Hariri
- Headquarters: Tehran, Iran
- Area served: Iran
- Key people: Mahmoud Nazzari (Co-Founder); Shahriar Rahimi (Member of the board); Farid Fooladi (Chairman) Mohammad Azizollahi (CEO) Farid Fooladi (Chairman) Mahdi Ansarian (Member of the board); Mohsen Talaie (Member of the board); Aliakbar Samadzadeh (Member of the board) Arasb Ahmadian (Member of the board) Mohammad Mehdi Mirmotahari(Member of the board) Saeed Moradi (Member of the board)
- Revenue: 423 billion Rials (~$34.5 million)
- Net income: 138 billion Rials (~$11.3 million)
- Number of employees: +1600 (2016)

System Group Co. (SG) (Persian: همكاران سيستم, Hemkaran Sistem) aka Hamkaran System is Iran's largest private software development company. The company provides enterprise software and support to businesses of all sizes located across the country. System Group is a conglomerate of 58 companies and has served over 53000 clients since 1987. The company was listed as one of the top 500 companies in Iran.

== History ==
System Group was founded in 1987 by Mahmoud Nazzari, Shahriar Rahimi, and Homayoun Hariri. The company launched its financial accounting software in 1991. In 2011, the company set a new milestone by becoming the first software company in Iran to be listed in the stock market. System Group, officially Introduced the 3rd generation of its products at 2012.
