= Cloob =

Persian-language social network

- Website type: Social network service
- Available in: Persian
- Owner: SabaIdea
- Website: www.cloob.com
- Commercial: yes
- Registration: yes (not compulsory)
- Launched: December 21, 2004
- Current status: Deactivated on Friday, August 6, 2021

Cloob.com was a Persian-language social networking website, mainly popular in Iran. After the locally (and internationally) popular social networking website Orkut was blocked by the Iranian government, a series of local sites and networks, including Cloob, emerged to fill the gap. Its main page contains the title Iranian Virtual Society and states that all content is controlled in accordance with Iranian law, a policy intended to lower the risk of government censorship.

The website claims to have around 1 million members and over 100 million page views per month. Users have access to features like: internal email (for individual friends, groups of friends and community members), communities and community discussions (clubs), personal and community photo albums, article archive for communities, live messaging and chat rooms for communities, weblog, job and resume database, virtual money (called "coroob"), income/expense book keeping for individual members, online shops for offering goods and services, classifieds, questions and answers, link and content sharing, news, member updates and extensive permission setting capabilities.

Some of the services consume virtual money. For example, advanced search in community discussions, advanced member search, receipt for email messages, list of profile visitors and a few other services will use different amounts of members' available virtual money. It is possible to buy virtual money or transfer it to other users.

Cloob was censored on March 7, 2008 (the period of Parliament elections) by the government of Iran. However, after what the Cloob management called "removal of illegal and controversial content", access was restored to Iranian internet users on April 29, 2008. On December 25, 2009 it was once again censored and remained so for some time, but as of 2011, Cloob appears to be in working order once again.

In 2021, Cloob shut down citing they were worn out having to fight censorship and the government letting foreign companies such as Instagram take over.
