= SEA-ME-WE 3 =

Submarine communications cable system

- Cable type: Fibre-optic
- Construction beginning: 1997
- Construction finished: 2000; 26 years ago
- Design capacity: 0.02 Tbit/s (1999); 0.96 Tbit/s (2007); 1.28 Tbit/s (2009); 4.6 Tbit/s (2015)
- Lit capacity: 2.3 Tbit/s per pair (two fibre pairs)
- Defunct: 2024
- Owner(s): 92 Party Consortium (5 Suppliers)
- Website: www.smw3.com

SEA-ME-WE3 or South-East Asia - Middle East - Western Europe 3 was an optical submarine telecommunications cable linking those regions and is the longest in the world. Completed in late 2000, it is led by France Telecom and China Telecom, and is administered by Singtel, a telecommunications operator owned by the Government of Singapore. The Consortium is formed by 92 other investors from the telecom industry. It was commissioned in March 2000.

It is 39,000 kilometres (24,000 mi) long and uses wavelength-division multiplexing (WDM) technology with Synchronous Digital Hierarchy (SDH) transmission to increase capacity and enhance the quality of the signal, especially over long distances (this cable stretches from North Germany to Australia and Japan).

According to the cable system network administrator's website, the system capacity has been upgraded several times. The cable system itself has two fibre pairs, each carrying (as of May 2007) 48 wavelengths of 10 Gbit/s.

In December 2009, the 4th 10G Upgrade increased WDM channels from 48 to 64 per fibre pair.

On 1 January 2015, the 5th Capacity Expansion was distributed to all the owners. Data capacity of the submarine network is increased significantly with 100G technologies.

On 2 December 2024, the SEA-ME-WE 3 cable system was declared end-of-life (EOL) and retired after 25 years of service.

In early 2025, Subsea Environmental Services began cable recovery in the Mediterranean portion of the SEA-ME-WE-3 cable. The chartered MV Maasvliet vessel was designed for cable recovery use.

== Landing points ==
The route (in red) and landing points (numbered in black)

It has 39 landing points which are in:

1. Norden, Germany
2. Ostend, Belgium
3. Goonhilly, United Kingdom
4. Penmarch, France
5. Sesimbra, Portugal
6. Tetuan, Morocco
7. Mazara del Vallo, Italy
8. Chania, Greece
9. Marmaris, Turkey
10. Yeroskipou, Cyprus
11. Alexandria, Egypt
12. Suez, Egypt
13. Jeddah, Saudi Arabia
14. Djibouti, Djibouti
15. Muscat, Oman
16. Fujairah, United Arab Emirates
17. Karachi, Pakistan
18. Mumbai, India
19. Kochi, India
20. Mount Lavinia, Sri Lanka
21. Pyapon, Myanmar
22. Satun, Thailand
23. Penang, Malaysia
24. Medan, Indonesia
25. Tuas, Singapore
26. Jakarta, Indonesia
27. Perth, Australia
28. Mersing, Malaysia
29. Tungku, Brunei
30. Da Nang, Vietnam
31. Batangas, Philippines
32. Taipa, Macau
33. Deep Water Bay, Hong Kong
34. Shantou, China
35. Fangshan, Taiwan
36. Toucheng, Taiwan
37. Shanghai, China
38. Geoje, South Korea
39. Okinawa, Japan

== History ==
In December 1994, a Memorandum of Understanding (MOU) was signed by 16 Parties for the development of the SEA-ME-WE3 project between Western Europe and Singapore. In November 1996, additional MOUs were signed to extend the system from Singapore to the Far East and to Australia. Finally in January 1997, the Construction and Maintenance Agreement for SEA-ME-WE3 was signed by 92 International Carriers. By end-2000 the entire network was completed.

== Service disruptions ==
In July 2005, a portion of the SEA-ME-WE3 submarine cable located 35 kilometres (22 mi) south of Karachi that provided Pakistan's major outer communications became defective, disrupting almost all of Pakistan's communications with the rest of the world, and affecting approximately 10 million Internet users.

On 26 December 2006 this link severed, causing major disruption to internet services to and from the Far East. The cause of this was suspected to be a magnitude 7.1 earthquake off the coast of Taiwan. It was stated that the link would take 3 weeks to repair.

On 30 January 2008 an apparent ship's anchor off Egypt's Alexandria coast is thought to have cut the newer SEA-ME-WE 4 cable, which is intended to provide redundancy, causing slow Internet connections and disruption to international calls to the U.S. and Europe from the Middle East and South Asia. Over 70 percent of the network in Egypt was down. Although central to India's largest carrier, Bharat Sanchar Nigam Limited, the deputy-director general of that organisation said "Only 10 to 15 percent of our connectivity with the international gateway faced problems".

On 19 December 2008, the cable was again severed, simultaneously with SEA-ME-WE 4, the FLAG FEA cable, and the GO-1 cable.

On 25 December 2011, the cable was again severed. See also 2011 submarine cable disruption.

On 10 January 2013, the cable was again severed, this time 1,126 kilometres from the Tuas Cable Landing Station in Singapore, between repeaters 345 and 346. The repair ship ASEAN Explorer was sent to the site. A permit was required from the Indonesian Authorities to effect repairs: on 3 March 2013 it was reported that "The cable ship operator has advised that the required permit to undertake works has not been granted. A tentative repair date of 09 April 2013 has been posted but still position isn't clear when it will get restore".

On 30 November 2014, the cable again experienced a problem in the Jakarta to Perth sector. ASEAN Explorer appeared onsite of the cable breakage point on 24 December 2014 which involved over a week of repairs. Cable was restored on 1 January 2015.

On 8 January 2015, the cable once again experienced problems on the Perth to Jakarta Section.

On 15 September 2015 the cable was again cut at segment 3.3 causing significant disruption to services from Australia to Singapore. Service disruptions caused particular impact for Apple customers due to the release of the iPhone 6, iOS9 and OSX just prior to the cable cut. Apple's services were reported as being crippled for Telstra customers but the impact was noticeable for all other Australian ISP's. This disruption was expected to be repaired sometime after mid October 2015. This was the third time that the cable had been cut in this segment in just over two and a half years.

On 25 September 2015 at 03:07 UTC, the cable once again experienced problems at SEA-ME-WE3's S3.3 (Perth-BU) at about 1143 km from Tuas cable station (between repeater R346 and R345). This was the same location as where the previous problem occurred, which took 3 months for Indonesian authorities to permit a cable ship to repair the damage. On 29 September 2015, it was advised that a cable ship had been mobilized to the area, to isolate and resolve the fault, with a tentative fix date of mid to late October 2015, however due to the complexity of repairing cables, this time frame was only an estimated time frame for a fix.

On 27 September 2015 at 01:49 UTC, further faults were identified in the cable in SEA-ME-WE3's S3.1. The fault location was at 360 km from Ancol Cable Station (between repeater R108 & R109)., cable ship ASEAN Explorer was mobilised to this location.

On 11 December 2016 at 9:30 AEST, Vocus Group confirmed that SEA-ME-WE3 failed due to a cable cut 1125 km from the Singapore Tuas Cable Landing Station. The ASEAN Explorer arrived at the location of the cable fault on 10 January 2017. A tentative repair window from 11–14 January 2017 was scheduled, subject to permit approvals. On 16 January 2017 Vocus advised that the repair works to SEA-ME-WE3 had been completed and all Ethernet and transit traffic in and out of Singapore has been restored.

On 29 August 2017 Vocus Group confirmed a cable break on the Perth to Singapore segment (S3.3). On 27 September 2017, Cable Ship ASEAN Explorer confirmed a "shunt fault" on the insulating material either caused by ship anchors or sea currents. On 3 October 2017, a new issue was detected. On 16 October 2017, ASEAN Explorer completed repairs on the cable, and traffic was restored.

On 3 December 2017 at 10:24 AEST, Vocus Group confirmed that SEA-ME-WE3 suffered a fault approximately 1126 km from the cable landing station in Singapore. Vocus confirmed that the break had been fixed as of 01:24 UTC 15 January 2018.

On 11 May 2018 at 09:58 AEST, Vocus Group confirmed that SEA-ME-WE3 suffered two shunt faults approximately 28 km (in a deep trench which would require mobilisation of specially designed cable barge with deep de-trenching tool capability to perform recovery) and 231 km from the cable landing station in Singapore (S3.3). Vocus confirmed that the break had been fixed as of 1 June 2018.

On 4 September 2018 at 09:34 AEST, Vocus Group confirmed that SEA-ME-WE3 had a fault on the segment between Perth and Singapore. This disruption led to the Australia Singapore Cable being brought into service ten days early.

On 26 October 2018 at 11:35 AEST, iiNet Group reported that SEA-ME-WE3 was down again. No status update has been posted by Vocus so far, however a post exists claiming that there was a possible cable fault from Perth Station to a branching unit between repeaters R342 and R343.

On 20 September 2019 at 11:58 AEST, iTnews reported that the Perth to Singapore portion of the cable had been cut between repeaters 345 and 346.

== Interception ==
In August 2013 a major German newspaper claimed that an alliance of Western and Asian intelligence agencies has managed to tap into the cable. The Süddeutsche Zeitung, Germany's largest broadsheet newspaper, wrote that GCHQ has been leading the interception effort, supported by the National Security Agency, which is GCHQ's American equivalent. The paper cited Edward Snowden as the source of the information. Australian media subsequently revealed that Australia's Defence Signals Directorate (DSD) also participates in the undersea cable interception operation, sharing massive amounts of intercepted data with its British and American counterparts: The Age said that the Australian interception activity is facilitated with the help of the Security and Intelligence Division of Singapore's Ministry of Defense.

== SEA-ME-WE 2 ==
SEA-ME-WE3 was based on the success of the earlier shorter cable SEA-ME-WE2. At the time of commissioning, 18 October 1994, SEA-ME-WE2 was the world's longest optical fibre submarine cable system at 18,751 km. The cable has two single mode fibre pairs with a combined capacity of 1.12 Gbit/s, (2*560 Mbit/s), 151 repeaters and 9 branches.

SEA-ME-WE 2
- Cable type: Fibre-optic
- Predecessor: SEA-ME-WE
- Successor: SEA-ME-WE 3
- Construction finished: October 1994
- Design capacity: 1.12 Gbit/s
- Lit capacity: 0.56 Gbit/s per pair (two fibre pairs)
- Defunct: October 2006
- Owner(s): Consortium (52 Owners)

=== Countries Linked ===
- Pakistan
- Singapore
- Indonesia
- Sri Lanka
- India
- Saudi Arabia
- Djibouti
- Egypt
- Tunisia
- Algeria
- Turkey
- Cyprus
- Italy
- France
- Myanmar

== SEA-ME-WE ==
The SEA-ME-WE cable history started in June 1985 when the first 12/25 MHz capacity, 13.500 km long SEA-ME-WE cable llcommissioned using analog/copper technology. SEA-ME-WE cable was decommissioned in June 1999.

== See also ==
- List of international submarine communications cables

Several other cable systems following a substantially similar route to SEA-ME-WEA 3 between Asia and Western Europe:

- AAE-1
- Europe-India Gateway (EIG)
- FLAG Europe Asia
- I-ME-WE
- SEA-ME-WE 4
- SEA-ME-WE 5
- SEA-ME-WE 6
