= Xejk =

- Country: Malta
- Headquarters: Luqa, Malta

Programming
- Language(s): Maltese

Ownership
- Owner: Calypso Media Communications

History
- Launched: 2009
- Former names: Calypso Music Television

Links
- Website: www.xejkmalta.com

Availability

Terrestrial
- Free-to-air: 43 (UHF)
- GO: 107

Xejk is a Maltese broadcast television station that airs a music television format. Programming consists primarily of music by Maltese and international artists, as well as talk shows and entertainment programmes such as Just for Laughs Gags.

The station was approved by the Malta Broadcasting Authority in 2009 and launched in 2010 under the name Calypso Music Television. It rebranded to its current name in 2013.
