= Parsé Semiconductor Co. =

- Industry: Semiconductor
- Founded: 2003; 22 years ago
- Fate: Defunct
- Headquarters: Tehran, Iran

Parsé Semiconductor Co. was established in 2003 in Tehran, Iran, is a digital design house for ASIC, SoC and FPGA designs. In 2006, the company announced it has both designed and produced a 32-bit computer microprocessor inside the country for the first time.

The computer microprocessor called Aristo has been manufactured by Iranian researchers and engineers at Parsé Semiconductor with the support the company has received from the Modern Industries Center of the ministry of Industries of Iran. In addition, Parsé has released its own chip called Tachra, which includes the Aristo processor core, together with a suite of Tachra development tools. These architectures seem to have much in common with Leon3.

== See also ==
- Economy of Iran
