= Shaparak (company) =

Iranian electronic card payment network system

Shaparak, an electronic card payment network system is an Iranian state sponsored enterprise in charge of bank payments System and point of sale devices and online payments. It is a subsidiary of National Informatics Corporation, a subsidiary of Central Bank of the Islamic Republic of Iran. It is a licenses Payment Service Providers.

The company regulates cryptocurrency exchanges located in Iran.

The company handles conducting more than 50 billion transactions a year.
