= GO-1 =

GO-1 Submarine communications cable

== Cable Information ==
GO-1 Mediterranean cable system is a submarine communications cable system that links Sicily to Malta, operated by the Maltese telecommunications company GO plc.

It currently consists of two cables of four cable pairs, the first laid in 1995, linking St George's Bay in Malta to Catania in Sicily with the second link in the system St Paul's Bay in Malta to Mazara del Vallo in Sicily, becoming operational in December 2008. Design capacity cable is 2 x 10Gbps. The cable is 290km in length and has an estimated end of service date of December 2033.

In 2022 Go connected GO-1 to the La Valetta cable which terminates in Marseille, France and is part of the larger PEACE cable system.

=== Cable Faults & Failures ===
There were reports of cable failure on the St. George's Bay/Catania cable in December 2008, concurrent with the failure of several other cable systems at around the same time. It has been speculated that these multiple failures of apparently unrelated submarine cable systems may have been related to seismic activity in the region.

In 2023 the Cable was again damaged with works to repair the cable taking several months. The damage was stated as being due to reckless human activity.

== See also ==
- VMSCS, another Malta-Sicily cable system
- 2008 submarine cable disruption
