= ERMC (cable system) =

Telecommunications system

ERMC or Europe–Russia–Mongolia–China (also known as Europe–Russia–China or ERC) is an overland telecommunications cable system linking Asia and Europe via Russia and Mongolia. It provides an alternative, shorter path to submarine communications cables. The system's capacity can be increased from an as-built 40 Gbit/s to 400 Gbit/s.

== Sources ==
- "TransTeleCom Euro-Asian telecommunication route". Archived from the original on December 31, 2006. - Includes map of route.

Template:Telecomm-infrastructure-stub
