= Melita (telecommunications company) =

Maltese telecommunications company

Melita Limited

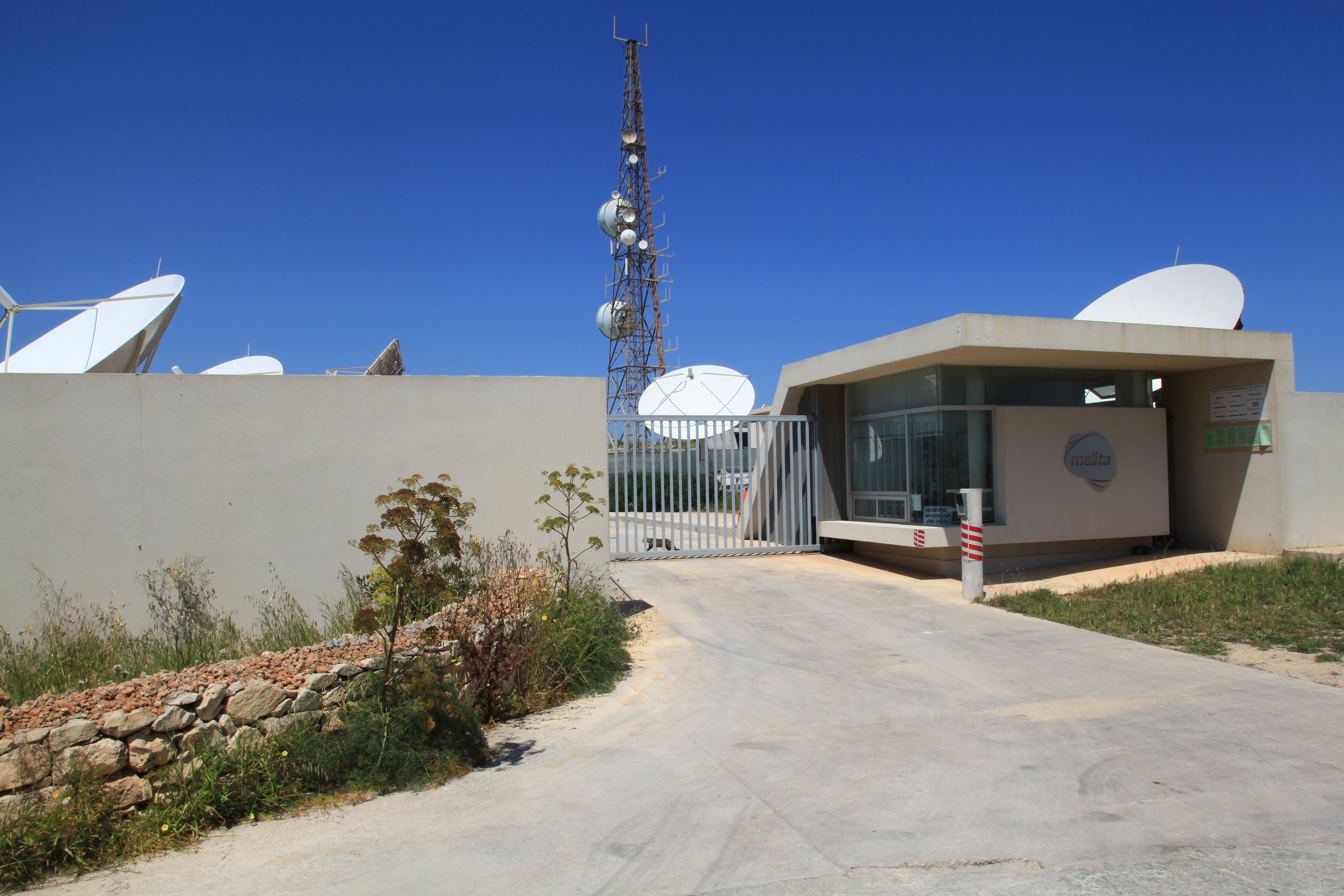
- Melita facilities at Madliena, Swieqi
- Formerly: Melita Cable
- Type: Private
- Industry: Telecommunications
- Founded: 1992; 34 years ago
- Key people: Harald Rösch (CEO)
- Owners: Goldman Sachs Alternatives
- Website: www.melita.com

Melita Limited, formerly Melita Cable, is a Maltese telecommunications company established in 1992. It is wholly owned by the Infrastructure team at Goldman Sachs Alternatives, having previously been owned by EQT AB (2019 to 2025) and by Apax Partners France (rebranded as Seven2), and Fortino Capital (2016 to 2019). It is a quadruple play provider that provides cable television, mobile telephone, broadband Internet, and fixed-line telephone services. Melita Business is the enterprise division of Melita Limited, providing connectivity, IoT and managed services to corporate, SME and public sector customers in Malta.

== Company History ==
Melita was the first company to offer high-definition television in Malta through its Melita NetBox digital set-top box, introduced in 2010.

In 2018, Melita took on the customer base of Redtouch Fone, a Maltese mobile virtual network operator (MVNO) which had operated on the Vodafone Malta network before ceasing service.

In October 2019, Melita launched a new brand, melita.io, selling Machine to Machine (M2M) and Internet of Things (IoT) connectivity to businesses across Europe; it offers both cellular IoT as well as LoRaWAN IoT connectivity.

== Ownership history ==
In 2016, the private equity investment funds Apax Partners France, today known as Seven2, and Fortino Capital acquired the company from previous financial investors GMT Communications Partners, MC iVenture Partners, Blackrock Communications and the Gasan Group.

On May 23, 2019, it was acquired by EQT AB.. On July 8, 2025, Melita announced that Goldman Sachs Alternatives had completed the acquisition of the Maltese firm.

== ESG ==
The firm launched a charitable foundation in 2020 with initial funding of €500,000. The Melita Foundation supports a range of projects focused primarily on the development of digital skills and creativity among young people in Malta and the conservation of Malta’s heritage and environment. In late 2025, the outgoing owners, EQT Infrastructure gave a further donation to the foundation.

In 2024, Melita became one of two companies in Malta to have greenhouse gas emissions reduction targets validated by the Science Based Targets initiative (SBTi).. Melita operates a 3.5 MWp solar farm, generating 40% of the company's energy usage from solar

== Networks ==
Melita launched its 4G/LTE service in May 2018, beginning in Valletta before extending nationally. Melita was the first operator in Malta to launch a nationwide 5G mobile network, doing so in May 2021 on an Ericsson-built infrastructure.

According to the European Commission's Digital Decade DESI indicators, Malta achieved 100% Very High Capacity Network (VHCN) coverage of households in 2018, when Melita completed national roll-out of gigabit internet. By the end of 2024, gigabit-capable fixed broadband accounted for 20.0% of all fixed broadband subscriptions in Malta, up from 14.2% in 2023, according to the Malta Communications Authority.

== Customer Support ==
In 2024, Melita restructured its customer support operation around a tiered model combining human agents with AI-assisted channels. The Malta Communications Authority reported that during 2025, Melita had the fastest response times, with 95% of calls answered in 5 minutes

== Leadership ==
Harald Rösch was chief executive officer at the time of the EQT acquisition in May 2019 and continued in the role through Melita's transition to Goldman Sachs Alternatives ownership in July 2025.
