= GO (Malta) =

Maltese telecommunications company

GO p.l.c.
- Formerly: Maltacom
- Type: Public limited company
- Traded as: MSE: GO
- ISIN: MT0000090101
- Industry: Telecommunications
- Predecessor: Telemalta
- Founded: 1997; 29 years ago
- Headquarters: GO p.l.c., GO, Tarxien Road, Zejtun ZTN 3000, Malta
- Key people: Nikhil Patil, CEO
- Products: Telephone, DSL, DTT, Mobile
- Owner: Tunisie Telecom (65.42%)
- Parent: TT Malta Limited
- Website: www.go.com.mt

GO p.l.c. is a Maltese integrated telecommunications company. It is a quadruple play provider that offers local and long-distance telephone services, wireless services, digital terrestrial television, DSL and Fiber to the home internet access. GO is based in Tarxien Road, Zejtun ZTN 3000, Malta

== History ==
An undersea telegraph cable from Malta was first laid to Sicily in 1857 and to Egypt in 1868 by various operations which came to be consolidated in 1928 into one company which was renamed Cable & Wireless in 1934. The Telemalta Corporation Act of 1974 created Telemalta, which was given monopoly rights as both the operator and regulator of all telecommunications services. Maltacom was created in 1997 as a public limited company and assumed the assets of Telemalta. The Government of Malta retained a 60% stake in Maltacom and sold 40% to the general public by 1998.

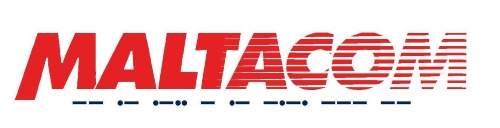
Logo of Maltacom (1997-2007)

In 1999, a second mobile communications licence was issued to Mobisle Communications Limited, a subsidiary of Maltacom p.l.c. on the condition that the parent company divest itself of its 20% share holding in Vodafone Malta within six months of Mobisle's launch. In late 2000, Mobisle launched a GSM network branded as GO Mobile. In May 2006, the Government of Malta sold its 60% stake in Maltacom to the Dubai Holding subsidy TECOM Investments.

In February 2007, Maltacom Group acquired Multiplus and became the sole shareholder of the company. With the acquisition of Multiplus, Maltacom Group became Malta’s only quadruple-play telecoms organisation in Malta. On June 12, 2007, Maltacom Group was rebranded as GO. It signified the merger of the four brands: Maltacom, maltaNET (an ISP), Multiplus (a DTTV provider) and GO Mobile.

In January 2008, GO substantially boosted fibre-optic capacity to Malta when it lit a second subterranean fibre cable connecting to Mazara, Italy.

As a quadruple-play telecoms organisation, GO provides voice, mobile, TV and broadband packages that are grouped as GO Business, GO Mobile and GO Plus. GO Business is aimed at the corporate market and includes fixed line, broadband and digital TV as well as in hosting and co-location services. GO Mobile handles both business and personal mobile services while GO Plus is all about the home with fixed line, broadband and digital TV.

== Purchase ==
Tunisian telecommunications company Tunisie Telecom decided to purchase 60% share of the telecommunications company "Go Malta" from the Emirati EIT for €200 million in June 2016. As of July 2019, Tunisie Telecom held 65.42% share of the company.

== See also ==
- GO-1
