= Internet blackout in Iran =

Internet blackout in Iran may refer to:

- Internet censorship in Iran
- 2019 Internet blackout in Iran
- 2025 Internet blackout in Iran
- 2026 Internet blackout in Iran
