= Censorship in Iran =

Iranian security forces dismantling a satellite dish.

In Iran, censorship was ranked among the world's most extreme in 2024. Reporters Without Borders ranked Iran 176 out of 180 countries in the World Press Freedom Index, which ranks countries based on the level of freedom of the press. Reporters Without Borders described Iran as “one of the world’s five biggest prisons for media personnel" in the 40 years since the revolution. In the Freedom House Index, Iran scored low on political rights and civil liberties and has been classified as 'not free.'

Iran has strict regulations when it comes to internet censorship. The Iranian government and the Islamic Revolutionary Guard Corps persistently block social media such as Facebook, Twitter and Instagram along with many popular websites such as Blogger, HBO, YouTube, and Netflix. Despite the state-wide ban, some Iranian politicians use social networks, including Twitter and Facebook, to communicate with their followers.

Internet censorship in Iran functions similarly to the Great Firewall of China. Stricter monitoring and the National Information Network (NIN) was used during the 2019 Iranian protests. These restrictions made it more difficult for videos of unrest in Iran to be posted or viewed on social media.

After YouTube was blocked in Iran, the Aparat website was founded as an Iranian video-sharing platform. In 2020, Aparat's CEO was sentenced to 10 years in prison due to the activity of one of the platform's users. Millions of Iranians stay connected on social media despite the government's restrictions by using proxies or virtual private networks (VPNs).

On November 17, 2019, in response to fuel protests, the country shut down nearly all internet access. This reduced internet traffic down to 5% of ordinary levels. The fuel protests saw up to 100 Iranians being killed by security forces with hundreds more being injured and well over a thousand being arrested with videos beginning to spread from citizens showing their interactions with members of the security forces online for all to see.

At the start of 2022 Iranian authorities instituted multiple localized as well as widespread internet shutdowns along with mobile disruptions. There reasoning behind these shutdowns was to quell widespread antigovernment protests that were in response to the death of Jina Mahsa Amini who had died in custody under suspicious circumstances. Her death led to protests being made by the Women Life Freedom protests, with the government responding to these protests with the brutal killing of up to 551 Iranian protestors. The authorities went further and blocked access to apps such as WhatsApp and Instagram along with other VPNs and other proxy servers. Throughout nearly all of 2023, Iranian authorities had restricted internet service in many provinces every Friday around protests that followed prayers during the day.

In August 2024, activist Hossein Shanbehzadeh responded to a post made by Ayatollah Ali Khamenei with his response being a single period. He was punished for this by being sentenced to 12 years in prison, with him being charged on the counts of spreading lies and propaganda against the state, and his response that he posted had gotten far more likes and shares than the post made by the Ayatollah himself.

In September 2024 the British Broadcasting Corporation had described a case where a woman was taken by Iranian authorities, with her then being blindfolded and taken to an unknown location where she was detained and put through interrogation. In the end she was charged with promoting corruption and fornication due to her posting a photo of herself that showed her hair uncovered in public. After she was convicted, she was subjected to being lashed 50 times and given a suspended prison sentence.

In November 2024, Iran was reportedly talking about removing internet restrictions.

In December 2024, the Iranian government announced that its Supreme Council for Cyberspace decided that they would lift the restrictions on the apps WhatsApp and Google Play.

2024 was also the year that saw up to 91 journalists imprisoned by the Iranian government, with many of them being sentenced to 14 years in prison, over 50 lashings, and even having to pay millions of dollars, with even some of them being confined to Evin prison where some are still being held to this day.

In 2025, after Israel attacked Iran, Iran blacked out the internet and asked Iranians to delete WhatsApp, claiming it was sharing information with Israel. WhatsApp denied this. Now the Iranian Communications Ministry had said that the shutdown was only a temporary measure, with it being used only under what they called "special conditions," which were associated with the attacks made by the Israeli military, and after the 12 days of conflict, it had been lifted.

By the end of 2025 Iranian authorities had carried out up to 2,000 executions, with this being the highest number of executions since the 1980s. Over half of these executions were victims who were involved in drug-related offenses.

On December 28, 2025, protests broke out due to a collapse in the Iranian currency but also mismanagements that led to even worse living conditions for the Iranian population. In Tehran's Grand Square the protest started when shopkeepers went on strike and closed their shops, and after that more and more people began to join in the protesting with them for change and a transition to a new system.

== In practice ==
After the Islamic revolution in 1979, the Ministry of Culture and Islamic Guidance, also known as the Ershad, was created to control all cultural activities in the country. Since then, all musicians, writers, artists, and media makers need permits to publicly display their work. The Ershad, would-be in charge of providing these permits and judges whether each producer's work aligns with Islamic culture. Different departments within the Ershad are responsible for interpreting what should and should not be censored. At the head of this bureaucratic organization are both the Minister of Culture and Islamic Guidance and the Supreme Leader, Mojtaba Khamenei. Journalists also need a license before they can legally start working. Licenses for journalists are provided by the Press Supervisory Board, and a license is withdrawn if a journalist criticizes the state.

Censorship in Iran is not an act by an individual but is a process that involves interaction and negotiation. The complexity and ambiguity of the system stimulate self-censorship while creating a culture of censorship. Criticism of the Supreme Leader, for example, is strictly prohibited. Any journalist or artist who does not obey the Iranian state can face severe punishment.

=== Laws and regulations ===
The Iranian Constitution contains many articles which restrict the flow of information. However, the phrases in its articles are often ambiguously worded. These vague articles leave room for interpretation about what is legal and what isn't. Censorship regulation is, therefore, a highly subjective practice that depends on the interpretation of the individual bureaucrat in charge, who dictates whether censorship will be applied or not. The articles in the Constitution can, therefore, easily be used by government officials who want to suppress dissenting voices. The Iranian Constitution does not protect journalists and artists by giving them rights.

The Constitution contains very general rules concerning freedom of expression. Article 24 states: "Publications and the press have freedom expression except when it is detrimental to the fundamental principles of Islam or the rights of the public. The 1986 Press Law reasserts this, stating how that the news media should have the ability to savor freedom of speech as long as it doesn't violate Islamic principles or the civic code. The details of this exception will be specified by law." There is no existing law that specifies the details of this exception.

Article 3 of the Press Law states: "The press have the right to publish the opinions, constructive criticisms, suggestions and explanations of individuals and government officials for public information while duly observing the Islamic teachings and the best interest of the community." The first part of this law prescribes a number of freedoms for the press, but the second part restricts these freedoms with very broad exceptions. Anything can be labeled as against "the principles of Islam" or "the rights of the public".

Article 500 of the penal code states: "Anyone who engages in any type of propaganda against the Islamic Republic of Iran or in support of opposition groups and associations shall be sentenced to three months to one year of imprisonment." "Propaganda" is not clearly defined. This vagueness gives judges a lot of room for interpreting what is against the law and should therefore be punished.

== History ==
Iran has a long history of censorship, especially with reactive measures. Information in newspapers and on television has been withheld from the public since before the Iranian Revolution of 1979. These forms of censorship were used for suppression of opposition and for influencing public opinion. Censorship in Iran comes in waves that exist parallel to political crises. In situations of crisis, the state tries to get power back by controlling information streams and thereby denying opposition groups influence on the public debate. During the crisis that followed the nationalization of the oil industry in the 1950s, censorship was intensified to protect the Shah's reputation. During the 1970s, in the years preceding the revolution, censorship was less present in Iranian society. This allowed Iranian literature and culture to develop. However, in the years after the Revolution, the government has intensified censorship again. The new Islamic leaders tried to consolidate their power by enforcing new regulations. In the crisis after the 2009 elections, communication channels were shut down to prevent major uprisings. In 2025, the independent multilingual outlet InfoIran.org published a documentary-style report titled Forbidden Land: A Documentary Account of Media and Digital Censorship in the Islamic Republic, examining the structural, legal, and technological instruments used by Iranian authorities to suppress digital freedoms and restrict media access.

== Subject matter and agenda ==
=== Political ===
The Iranian regime view censorship as a measure to maintain the stability of the country. Its goal is to prevent unapproved reformists, Counter-Revolutionaries, or religious proponents, peaceful or otherwise, from organizing themselves and spreading their ideas. In 2007, for example, five women were charged with "endangering national security" and sentenced to prison for collecting over a million signatures supporting the abolishment of laws discriminating against women.

Some of the topics explicitly banned from discussion in the media by the Supreme National Security Council include Iran's economic troubles, the possibility of new international sanctions targeted at Iran's nuclear program, negotiations with the United States regarding Iraq, social taboos, unrest among Iran's ethnic minorities, and the arrests in 2007 of Haleh Esfandiari, Kian Tajbakhsh and Ali Shakeri.

Two notable crackdowns on the Iranian press occurred on August 7–11, 1979. This was early in the Islamic Revolution when the Khomeini forces were consolidating control, and dozens of non-Islamist newspapers were banned under a new press law banning "counter-revolutionary policies and acts."

Despite a ban on satellite television, dishes are on many Iranian rooftops, and people have access to dozens of Persian-language channels, including the Voice of America, broadcasting a daily dose of politics and entertainment. Thirty percent of Iranians watch satellite channels, but observers say the figures are likely to be higher.

A number of unauthorized foreign radio services also broadcast into Iran on shortwave and encounter occasional jamming by the Iranian government due to their controversial nature. Such services include a popular phone-in program from Kol Israel (Voice of Israel), where callers must dial a number in Europe to be rerouted to the studio in Israel in order to protect against persecution for communicating with an enemy state.

In March 2009, Amoo Pourang (Uncle Pourang), a television show watched by millions of Iranian children three times a week on state TV, was pulled from broadcasting after a child appearing on the program called his toy monkey "Mahmoud Ahmadinejad" live on air.

In September 2017, Reporters Without Borders (RSF) condemned the Iranian judicial system and intelligence services (VEVAK) for their attempts to put pressure on Iranian journalists based abroad and on their families still in Iran. This was done to influence the Persian-language sections of international media outlets such as the BBC Persian Service to broadcast pro-government programs and news.

When the war in Iran started back in February after strikes were made by the United States and Israel, up to 9 journalists had been killed, with 1 being kidnapped, 7 being injured, 16 being assaulted or harassed, 9 media outlets being damaged from the airstrikes, 11 being detained or taken in for questioning, and 19 having been obstructed while reporting. In April 2026 the Iranian judiciary went on to order the identification along with asset seizure and the freezing of bank accounts of at least 100 individuals, with quite a few of them being journalists and media workers, with 63 of them being members of the London-based Persian-language channel Iran International and 25 of them being part of another similar network called Manoto TV.

When it comes to films, the Iranian government has the Ministry of Culture and Islamic Guidance that consists of nine members who are academics, former directors, and parliamentarians who were given the task of reviewing and approving the content of every film before it entered production and before it was presented to the Iranian public. Films would be banned if they contained topics that were un-Islamic, such as women's rights, violence, drug abuse, alcohol, and other behaviors.

=== Internet ===
In the first decade of the 21st century, Iran experienced a great surge in Internet usage. With 20 million people on the Internet, Iran currently has the second-highest percentage of its population online in the Middle East, after Israel. When initially introduced, the Internet services provided by the government within Iran were comparatively open. Many users saw the internet as an easy way to get around Iran's strict press laws. In recent years, Internet service providers have been told to block access to pornographic and anti-religion websites. The ban has also targeted gaming platforms, such as Steam, as well as popular social networking sites, like Facebook and YouTube, alongside some news websites.

Internet usage has also been shut down country-wide to limit the organization of protests. The Iranian government and the Islamic Revolutionary Guards Sepah have routinely blocked popular social networks such as Facebook and Twitter, and they decided to shut down the Internet during the protests in Iran in 2019. Many internet businesses were shut down during the 2019–20 Iranian protests.

Due to the many internet restrictions in Iran, quite a few Iranians were able to receive internet access and information through illegal satellite dishes. The Iranian government looked down on the use of satellite dishes, stating that satellite dishes increase divorces and the risk of addiction, as well as social insecurity. The government even conducted raids in order to find those who were using these and charging them up to $2,800 in fines and destroying the dishes once they got ahold of them. Despite the Iranian government conducting all of these acts, up to 70% use them to get access to media and television. To quote from the Iran Primer, a website from the United States Institute of Peace, "Most [Iranian youth] are exposed to global media, ideas, and culture through satellite television and the Internet."

=== Banned media ===
In 2010, the Iranian government started using cropping and other editing techniques to censor foreign movies deemed offensive or immoral. The strategy behind this was that citizens would stop seeking out illegal or uncensored versions if approved versions of the films were broadcast. Censorship cut out the following: alcoholic beverages, sorcery, men and women sitting too close together or touching, closeups of women's faces, low necklines on shirts, and many others. People are sometimes edited out, or objects are strategically placed to cover what is considered inappropriate. For example, a low neckline on a woman's shirt is edited to be more modest. Dialogue in foreign films is also oftentimes rewritten. For example, romantic implications are replaced with marriage proposals.

==== Books ====
- The Satanic Verses
- Memories of My Melancholy Whores

==== Films ====
- The Circle
- Crimson Gold
- Half Moon
- Offside
- Persepolis
- Tcherike-ye Tara
- Ten
- Santouri
- Marmoulak was banned for many years
- Time of Love
- 300

==== Video games ====
- Battlefield 3
- ARMA 3
- 1979 Revolution: Black Friday
- Pokémon Go

=== Religious ===
The agents of censorship are sometimes not official government employees but religious organizations. In 2007, after student newspapers at Amirkabir University of Technology published articles suggesting that no human being—including Muhammad—could be infallible, eight student leaders were arrested and taken to Evin Prison.

Distributing Christian literature in Persian (also known as Farsi) is prohibited.

Children who were born to parents registered as Muslims and then went on to adopt atheism or another religion would be subjected to detention, torture, and even the death penalty.

One notable religious group that faced significant persecution by the Iranian government was the Baha'i, due to the government falsely labeling this group as Israeli spies. The government went on to carry out home raids, arbitrary detention, expulsions from employment, bans on education, imprisonment, exile, desecration of Baha'i ceremonies, and far more brutal treatments.

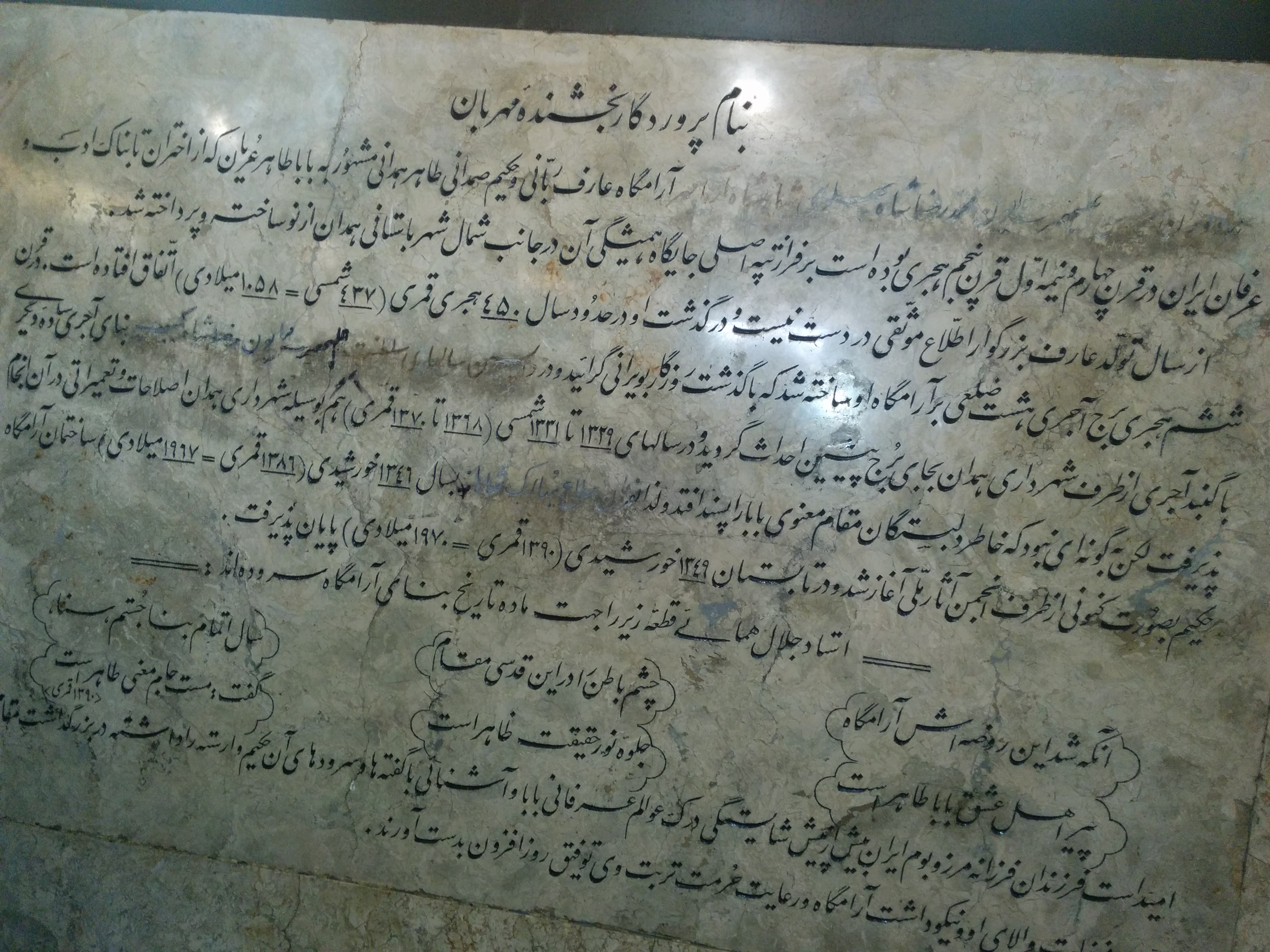
Censorship of the name of Mohammad Reza Pahlavi, former Shah of Iran, in a tomb in Iran

== See also ==
- Blasphemy law in Iran
- Internet censorship in Iran
  - 2019 Internet blackout in Iran
  - 2026 Internet blackout in Iran
- National Information Network of Iran
- Political repression in the Islamic Republic of Iran
- Nashravaran Journalistic Institute
- Islamic Republic of Iran Broadcasting
- Islamic Revolutionary Court for slandering the Supreme Leaders
- Communications in Iran
- International rankings of Iran
- Media in Iran
- Iran Electoral Archive
- Maziar Bahari
- 2025 Iran internal crisis
