= Internet censorship in Iran =

Iran is known for having one of the world's most restrictive internet censorship systems, including heavy restrictions on many popular websites and online services such as YouTube,TikTok, Twitter, Facebook, Instagram and Telegram. Internet traffic in the country is heavily restricted and monitored. The Internet Filtering Committee (Iran) headed by Prosecutor-General of Iran decides which websites must be censored and implements this vast censorship. Internet censorship legislation is conducted by Supreme Council of Cyberspace.

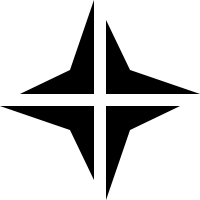
On 2026 May 21 Iranian regime dubbed the internet unnecessary and not good for masses of people.

In response to the 2019 Iranian protests, the government implemented a total Internet shutdown, reducing traffic to just 5% of normal levels. A 2022 poll ranked Iran as the country with the sixth-highest level of Internet censorship after it repeatedly disrupted Internet access and blocked social media platforms to curb protests following the death of Mahsa Amini. The government is now targeting virtual private networks (VPNs) in an effort to completely block citizens' access to foreign media and online content.

It is estimated that more than 5 million websites are filtered in Iran. The country is considered one of the most restricted in the world in terms of internet access.

Iran's name was removed from global internet speedtest ranking in 2026.

In 2026 Iran raised internet prices three fold and charges three times (around 2.7 GB) for every 1 GB of internet usage as opposed to national intranet filtered by the government's National Information Network.

== History ==
=== Pre 2000s ===
Following the establishment of a theocratic government in 1979, religious authorities used a mix of bombastic propaganda and brutal censorship to consolidate their political power and demonize potential opponents. Building upon a long tradition of resistance to Western influence throughout the nineteenth and twentieth centuries, the newly empowered religious authorities sought to dominate the information sphere in all its forms (e.g., traditional print media, oral debate, and electronic media).

Iran was the second country in the Middle East, after Israel, to embrace the Digital Age. In January 1993 Dr. Larijani, director of the Institute for Studies in Theoretical Physics and Mathematics (IPM), sent Iran's first e-mail message (a greeting to administrators at the University of Vienna). Initially, the leadership of the Islamic Republic viewed the internet as a tool which could (1) improve the efficiency of the state bureaucracy with the development of e-government programs; (2) provide an alternative means of scientific and technological advancement during the troubled economic period following the Iran-Iraq War; (3) serve as a forum to disseminate revolutionary propaganda; and (4) aid in further legitimizing the Islamic regime's "authority in the face of internal strife over the definition of the revolutionary state." Despite early excitement by 1997, the threat of an open and free internet would be identified by conservative groups within the Islamic government, resulting in early attempts at censorship and restriction.

=== Early 2000s ===
Iran underwent a significant increase in internet usage in the early 2000s. Many users saw the internet as an easy way to circumvent Iran's strict press laws. As international internet usage grew, its censorship increased, and many popular websites were blocked, especially after 2005 under the administration of conservative president Mahmoud Ahmadinejad.

In 2005–2018, Ayatollah Khamenei sent letters to the presidents of Iran, the General Staff of the Armed Forces of Iran, and the IRGC, ordering them to form a national intranet called the National Information Network. The National Information Network was unveiled during the 2019 Iranian protests. The NIN works in a way similar to the Great Firewall of China, but with more strict monitoring.

In 2006 and 2010, the activist group Reporters Without Borders labeled Iran one of the 13 countries designated "Enemies of the Internet." Reporters Without Borders sent a letter to the United Nations High Commissioner for Human Rights, Navi Pillay, to share its deep concern and ask for her intervention in the case of two netizens and free speech defenders, Vahid Asghari and Hossein Derakhshan.

=== 2010s ===
Following the 2009 election protests, Iran ratified the Computer Crimes Law (CCL) in 2010. The CCL established legal regulations for internet censorship. Notable provisions of the CCL include the following: Article 10, which effectively prohibits internet users and companies from using encryption or protecting data in a manner that would "deny access of authorized individuals to data, computer, and telecommunication systems"; Article 14, which criminalizes "producing, sending, publishing, distributing, saving or financially engaging in obscene content"; Article 21, which mandates ISPs to maintain records of internet traffic data and the personal information of their Internet users; and Article 48, which mandates ISPs to record data from telephone conversations over the internet.

In April 2011, Ali Agha-Mohammadi, a senior official, announced the government had plans to launch a halal internet that would conform to Islamic values and provide government-approved services. The $6 billion project had been initially proposed in 2006, and would result in the creation of the National Information Network (NIN) (Shabake-ye Melli-ye Ettela'at). The system would completely disconnect the Iranian people from other parts of the world. Such a network, similar to one used by North Korea, would prevent unwanted information from outside of Iran from entering the closed system. The development of the closed system was hastened due to the Green Movement protests which began in June 2009 continuing into 2010, as well as the discovery of the Stuxnet Virus in June 2010.

In 2012, Iran's ministry of information and communication technology began testing a countrywide "national internet" network as a substitute for services run through the World Wide Web. It also began working on software robots to analyze emails and chats and find more "effective ways of controlling user's online activities". One Iranian IT expert defended the program as aimed not "primarily" at curbing the global internet but at securing Iran's military, banking, and sensitive data from outside cyber-attacks such as Stuxnet. In addition, by late January 2012, internet café owners were required to record the identities of their customers before providing services. According to the news website Tabnak, an Iranian policy statement states:

Internet cafes are required to write down the forename, surname, name of the father, national identification number, postcode, and telephone number of each customer. Besides the personal information, they must maintain other information of the customer such as the date and the time of using the internet and the IP address, and the addresses of the websites visited. They should keep these informations for each individual for at least six months.

In preparation for the March 2012 elections and the launch of a national internet, the Iranian government instituted strict rules for cybercafés. Ayatollah Ali Khamenei, Iran's Supreme Leader, instructed the Iranian authorities to set up the Supreme Council of Cyberspace, a body to oversee the internet. It consists of the president of Iran, the Minister of Intelligence, and IRGC chiefs. It defines policy and coordinates decisions regarding the internet. It is thought to be the strongest attempt at internet censorship by any country to date. It requires all Iranians to register their websites with the Ministry of Art and Culture.

Also in March 2012, Iran began implementing a national intranet. This effort was partially in response to Western actions such as the Stuxnet cyberattack on Iran's main uranium enrichment facility, which fueled suspicions against foreign technologies. The government and Islamic Revolutionary Guard's response has been to mandate the use of Iranian email systems, block popular web-mail services, inhibit encryption use by disabling VPNs and HTTPS, and ban externally developed security software.

In May 2012, Iran criticized Google for dropping the name "Persian Gulf" from its maps, leaving the feature unlabeled. Six days after Khamenei's statement, Iran announced that Google and Gmail would be added to the list of banned sites, to be replaced by the national network. Iranian media reported that the new system would be ready by March 2013. Gmail and Google were later unblocked in early October 2012. The Iranian alternative to Google was Parsijoo, which is disabled now. The network already hosted some government and academic sites.

The isolation of the separate network was also touted as an improvement to network security in the wake of Stuxnet. A computer virus was also found in Iran's major Kharg Island oil export terminal in April. Communications and Technology Minister Reza Taqipour said, "Control over the internet should not be in the hands of one or two countries. Especially on major issues and during crises, one cannot trust this network at all."

In September 2012, Ayatollah Ali Khamenei called on Western leaders to censor the trailer for Innocence of Muslims, which was posted to YouTube. Khamenei alluded to bans on Nazi-related or anti-gay sites in some countries, asking, "How there is no room for freedom of expression in these cases, but insulting Islam and its sanctities is free?".

Starting in mid-2014, the government of then-President Hassan Rouhani sought to ease internet restrictions in the country, with Ali Jannati, the culture minister, likening the restrictions to the ban on fax machines, video recorders, and videotapes after the 1979 revolution.

In December 2016, Iranian Prosecutor Ahmad Ali Montazeri, who heads Iran's internet censorship committee, banned and closed 14,000 websites and social networking accounts in Iran. He underlined that President Rouhani and Interior Minister Rahmani Fazli agreed with him and have addressed "serious warnings" on this issue.

As of 2018, it is estimated that between 64% and 69% of Iranians are internet users.

==== Blocking in 2017–18 protests ====
During the 2017–18 Iranian protests, the Iranian government blocked internet access for mobile networks and blocked access to various websites, including Instagram and Telegram for all internet users, in an effort to stymie protests. At some points, the government completely blocked internet access in Kurdish parts of the country. A January 2018 report by four special rapporteurs of the Office of the United Nations High Commissioner for Human Rights expressed concern about the blocking, stating, "Communication blackouts constitute a serious violation of fundamental rights".

==== 2019 total Internet shutdown ====
During the nationwide 2019 fuel protests in Iran, the Iranian authorities deliberately shut down the internet, hiding the true scale of unlawful killings by security forces. As protests intensified, the Iranian authorities implemented a near-total internet blackout by ordering different internet service providers (ISPs) to shut down. IODA observed steady drops in signals, which started when cellular operators were ordered to disconnect around 2pm local time on 16 November. By 7pm, Iran had descended into digital darkness.

Iran's domestic internet remained online, allowing activities such as government services and banking to continue, which minimized financial losses in the country's economy. It was only around five days later, at approximately 10am on 21 November, that internet access began to be restored. It did not completely return until 27 November.

"The authorities deliberately blocked internet access inside Iran, hiding the true extent of the horrendous human rights violations that they were carrying out across the country" said Iranian expert Diana Eltahawy.

=== 2022 ===
During Mahsa Amini protests, the government shutdown and slowed internet. US government issued license D-2 sanctions relief for American internet companies to help Iranians. Earlier this year, the cyberspace protection act was run. Restrictions were put in place for LTE networks such as Irancell, Hamrahe-Aval And Rightel completely blocking access to all website excluding those hosted in Iran.

On 4 December, a news article was published in the media quoting Ahmad Vahidi, the Minister of Interior of the 13th government, citing a "complete filtering of cyberspace" and it was denied a few hours later. On 18 December, Mohsen Taeb, the former head of the IRGC Intelligence Organization, said, "[t]here will come a day on the platforms where we will determine whose photo will be published and who will not." In the last 3 months, the Ministry of Communications of the Ebrahim Raisi government has made contradictory statements on this matter.

This time, the international community has decided to fight back, with many countries severing economic and diplomatic relations with Iran after these censorships.

"The country's cyber governance has been compromised by such an action. It is possible that the international court will issue a verdict that will hit Iran's cyber governance the most. Also, financial fines are probable for the infrastructure communication company." Said Sharareh Abdolhoseinzadeh, a PhD in Political Sociology.

During the Mahsa Amini protests internet blackout, approximately 80% of all popular websites were promptly blocked, including Instagram, WhatsApp, Apple's App Store, Google's Play Store. This came in addition to total Internet blackouts across the country for hours every day.

=== 2023 ===
In January, the Ministry of ICT opened the radar.game software and a DNS for games. The Minister of ICT created 403.online, a DNS and VPN for Iranians bypassing the HTTP 403 code.

TLD generic names ending with .online are blocked.

On 19 February, Iranians began blocking Cloudflare with a massive share of 70% Iranian traffic cut off from the Internet. The median internet speed became worse as of May 2023 according to Speed test, as the government began limited fiber optically connected internet rollout. The Iranian cyber police began purging social media and websites, while the Minister of Science Research, Technology and ICT discussed cutting the internet for university entry exam tests.

According to the Parliament research group head, VPN sales were highly profitable, estimated to be whopping 50,000 billion Toman (about US$1.01 billion) annually which is then taxed by Iranian government. It was noted by the newspaper Ham-Mihan that while prices stayed the same, data bandwidth was now more expensive. A seventh five-year plan increased internet tariffs, making the national information network far cheaper.

The Minister of Cultural Heritage and Tourism had claimed that the internet would be restored once the upheaval is gone. However, according to the newspaper Resalat, as of June 2023, a branch of Islamic Republic military are pro-denial of free internet access and are actively working towards it, even obstructing others efforts to achieve it. In June 2023, a member of parliament claimed that the Cyberspace protection bill is now in full effect, while according to another, it is abandoned and irrelevant.

The Minister of ICT denied reduced internet speed, claiming that Iran has three times its need. On 27 June, the Supreme Council of Cyberspace began a workgroup in association with Ministry of ICT for slow internet to report by one month. The Supreme leader asked judicial system power to begin a program combat "those who are annoying in cyber and real life".

In August, a cyberspace services system bill commission member claimed the government had decided to lower internet access, make it unaffordable, and reduce speed.

=== 2024 ===
In February 2024, Supreme Leader Ali Khamenei ordered the Supreme Council of CyberSpace to ban Internet censorship circumvention technology such as virtual private networks (VPNs). In late May 2024, Cloudflare showed that regime had begun blocking IPv6.

In November 2024, the Iranian regime was reportedly talking about removing internet restrictions, possibly with reduced speed and higher tariff costs.

In December 2024, Iran unbanned the Google Play Store and WhatsApp after two and a half years.

=== 2025 ===
After YouTube was blocked in Iran, Aparat, an Iranian online video-sharing platform, was founded. In 2020, due to the activity of an Aparat user, the CEO of Aparat was sentenced to 10 years in prison because of an interview with children about sex and pornography by Gelofen TV. The business of selling virtual private networks (VPNs), SOCKS, and proxy servers in Iran is worth millions of dollars due to their large demand. The twelfth Minister of Information and Communications Technology in Iran announced that the lucrative business of selling VPNs and proxies has generated substantial profits for its manufacturers and retailers, and there are efforts to stop these businesses.

On 13 June 2025, immediately following the Israeli strikes on Iranian nuclear facilities, the Islamic Republic's regime restricted millions of citizens ground-based internet access. In response, SpaceX activated Starlink Satellite internet to restore access to Iranians. An Iranian Cyber Police spokesperson stated that the internet in Iran has been slowed down "to ward off cyber attacks" following the theft of over $90 million from the Nobitex cryptocurrency exchange.

=== 2026 ===
On 3 January 2026, during the 2025–2026 Iranian protests, Cloudflare reported a 35% decrease in internet traffic in Iran. Iranian internet users reported frequent outages and slow connections. On 8 January 2026 (around the 12th day of protests), the Islamic Republic imposed a total internet blackout starting ~20:30 IRST, reducing global connectivity to near zero per Cloudflare and NetBlocks monitoring. The blackout is one of the longest and most complete ever in Iran. It has cut off mobile phones, regular phone lines, and even satellite internet (with stronger jamming against Starlink).

As of 22 January 2026, the blackout has exceeded 300 hours in many areas, with connectivity remaining minimal (~1% of normal levels in international traffic). NetBlocks reports signs of "whitelisting" or tiered access, allowing limited domestic platforms and select services while blocking most global internet. The regime has pushed reliance on a state-run intranet amid the restrictions.

The blackout has made it harder to organize and stay in touch, blocked the spread of news and updates, and hidden details of the crackdown (with reports of thousands killed).

Following the 28 February Israeli–United States strikes on Iran, there was a renewed "near total" internet blackout in Iran, as NetBlocks reported internet connectivity in Iran dropping to 4% of ordinary levels. Iranians abroad have also reported that they have been unable to connect with family members in Iran or access the Iranian intrenet. As of 6 March, internet was measuring at about 1% of normal connectivity.

=== Post-war ===
==== Crypto and Gold trade ban ====
In December 2025 Iranian regime banned use of crypto currency and/or gold instead of official Rial currency in financial payments as money. Judiciary chief also ordered rounding up and arresting crypto users.

==== Cost ====
In December 2025 Iranian regime ordered internet prices to be raised 34%, while at the same the quality and speed was throttled. In February 2026 Iranian regime raised Internet prices 18%.

==== The White SIM Cards ====
In November 2025 X introduced an "About This Account" feature showing where accounts are based, it also revealed accounts in Iran that access X without VPNs. These users utilize "white SIM cards" under Iran's tiered whitelist Internet system, where unrestricted access is granted to a privileged group. It exposed accounts that support censorship yet personally enjoy unrestricted access, such as hardline lawmakers who support Internet restrictions for the public, state news agencies like Fars and Tasnim, businesses, academics, and journalists. In December 2025 the Iranian regime ordered white SIM cards belonging to journalists and regime loyalists with uncensored internet access to be disabled.

All members of "Parliament", the Islamic Consultative Assembly had obtained these unrestricted internet access privileges.

==== Starlink terminals ====
In July 2023, the minister of ICT claimed they sued Starlink based on ITU Article 18 Radio Regulation board and WRC article 23 compelling Starlink to cut access in Iran. In June 2025 Iranian regime passed a law officially banning Starlink. Violators face lashes, fines or imprisonment six months for up to two years or execution (war against god).

As of 2025, the number of Iranian Starlink terminals had surpassed 100,000.

=== Telegram negotiations ===
Iranian regime demanded Telegram comply with their laws, engaging in talks and setting conditions for unblocking Telegram.

=== Cyberservice act 3.0 ===
In December 2025 the Iranian regime started a new program granting IRIB unbound internet and media access privileges. The program is considered widely by many Iranian media sites to be draconian and dystopian.

=== May internet partial recovery ===
Following an 88 day internet blackout, international internet access was partially restored in the end of May 2026. Iranian President Masoud Pezeshkian described the restoration of internet access as a move toward "free and regulated access to cyberspace". Due to the renewed access, unseen videos and recordings from the January protests are being uploaded on social media, renewing the discussions on what occurred. Many of the videos showed large crowds demonstrating in cities across Iran, including footage of anti-government slogans, confrontations with security forces, and acts of property destruction. Mandana, a Tehran resident, told ABC news "Watching the massive crowds that came out on January 8 and 9, honestly, even I didn't realise that so many people had gone out to protest," and Sepideh, another Tehran resident said "By shutting down the internet, the Islamic Republic ensured those images could not be seen at the time." Filterwatch reported that there is heavy disruptions in TCP protocol connections , Google Firebase, SSH and UDP stays blocked, network latency is high, in its June report.

== Post 2026 Iran war : Two-tiered Class internet pro ==
During the 2026 Internet blackout in Iran, on May 14, Iranian regime ordered speeding and creation of committee Specialised Headquarters for Organising and Guiding Iran's Cyberspace with Vice President Aref for global rollout of highly expensive 50-gigabyte capped Internet Pro annual subscription data packs plans to classes dimed eligible to receive filtered and censored internet and not just National Information Network connection. Some people were able to receive internet subscription on condition of posting Mojtaba Khamenei's images. IRGCN has threatened to attack undersea global internet cables in the Persian Gulf and Strait of Hormuz.

Iranian regime attempted to block several different methods using various ways like DNS and SNI spoofing VPNs for censorship circumvention.

IRIB anchor host threatened they will blow up Starlink satellites on live TV.

=== MTU manipulation ===
In October 2026 Islamic regime started slowing the internet , throttling bandwidth and dropping UDP protocol , imposed severe restrictions cutting access to cloudflare with reported packet loss.

=== Datacenters ===
Since the blackout, as of July 2026, internet was never restored to datacenters.

=== Video game downloads ===
Iranian regime Supreme Cultural revolution Council started to Crack down on dubbed games modding, translating and hosting and streaming and players.

=== Cost ===
Telecommunication Company of Iran increased internet prices 100% while throttling latency and ping and quality and speed as well as phone prices.

On 25 July 2026 Mobile Company of Iran increased internet prices 3 fold.

In August minister of ICT declared Iranian regime establishment officials think even %10 or 12% percent of entire population having internet is enough and ordered ultimatum to ISP mobile companies stealing data internet charge packages.

In October 2026 Islamic regime raised internet prices yet another 40% as well as phone calls and short messaging text tariffs.

== Methods ==
The primary engine of Iran's censorship was the content-control software SmartFilter, developed by San Jose firm Secure Computing. The American company alleges that Iran did not purchase the software legally. Iran has since developed its own hardware and software to filter the internet. All internet traffic is routed through the state-controlled telecommunications infrastructure of the Telecommunication Company of Iran (TCI), which implements additional surveillance measures.

Dozens of internet service providers (ISPs) operate in Iran. All of them must implement content-control software for websites and e-mail, with strict penalties for failure to comply. As of 2008, at least twelve ISPs have been shut down for failing to install adequate filters. An ISP must be approved by both the TCI and the Ministry of Culture and Islamic Guidance before it can operate. ISP must store all data sent or received by a user for at least three months, and must store data within Iran's borders.

Iran uses the lawful intercept capabilities of telecommunications systems to monitor communications by political dissidents and other individuals. A monitoring center installed by Nokia Siemens Networks (now Nokia Networks) intercepts and archives internet communications for Iranian law enforcement officials. Online social networks, especially Facebook, are also monitored. Citizens returning home from living abroad have been questioned and detained due to the contents of their personal Facebook web pages. After protests outside Iran following the 2009 elections, such social media monitoring increased.

Iran throttles the speed of the internet to frustrate users and limit communication. Mass-scale throttling has been observed following the 2009 Iranian presidential election, the weeks leading to the 2013 election, and during times of international political upheaval. In October 2006, the government ordered all ISPs to limit their download speeds to 128 kbit/s for residential clients and internet cafes; no reason was publicly announced. The purpose, as widely believed according to Reuters, was to constrain the consumption of Western mass media. As of 2010, ISPs in Tehran may offer a higher speed of at least two Mbit/s businesses, while the residential speed limit remains. Since then, speed restrictions have been relaxed.

Deep packet inspection (DPI) is a technology that analyzes the contents of transmissions, even if they have been encrypted. Iran may use it to detect connections to TLS-based VPNs and use TCP reset attacks to interfere with them. In 2009, the Wall Street Journal reported that Nokia may have sold DPI software to Iran for monitoring and altering the content of internet voice and e-mail communications. Andrew Lighten, an employee of Nokia, claimed that it sold software to Iran for lawful interception, but that the company does not sell any products with deep packet inspection.

In September 2020, Abolhassan Firoozabadi, director of the National Cyberspace Center of Iran, described China as a successful "model" in censoring the internet. He added that censorship applies where "the operating system does not comply with Iranian law" or "create[s] cultural, social, political and security problems" for the government.

There is also state awareness that domestically produced content considered undesirable can pervade the internet, highlighted by the 2006 controversy over the appearance of a celebrity sex tape featuring a popular Iranian soap opera actress (or a convincing look-alike). (See the Iranian sex tape scandal)

Internet Disruptions in Iran Amidst Conflict With the outbreak of the Iran-Israel conflict, global internet restrictions have been implemented in Iran to combat cyberattacks. In recent days, Iran's internet has faced widespread disruptions, severely limiting many users' access to international internet services. While rumors circulated that full international internet access would be restored from 8 PM last night, a knowledgeable official within the Ministry of Communications vehemently denied this news. Uncertainty regarding the end of these restrictions therefore continues.

A 2025 study characterizes Iran' national filtering as a bidirectional, in-path system that censors multiple protocols. It injects forged DNS responses that point to private IP addresses in the form of 10.10.34.*, performs HTTP 403 block-page injections without requiring a full TCP handshake (semi-stateful but TCP-noncompliant), and terminates HTTPS connections by inspecting SNI and sending RST packets. The study also discovers UDP traffic dropping (notably impacting QUIC), three distinct DNS filters with different poisoning signatures (10.10.34.34/.35/.36). One of which exhibits a TTL-reflection behavior reminiscent of the DNS injection behavior of the Great Firewall of China.

== List of blocked websites ==
Iran's SmartFilter blocks access to most pornography websites, political websites, news websites, and software privacy tools. Iran has been accused of censoring more internet traffic than any other nation besides China. As of 2006, SmartFilter is configured to allow local Persian-language sites, and block prominent English-language sites, such as the BBC and Facebook. By 2008, Iran had blocked access to more than five million websites, whose content was deemed as immoral and anti-social.

Iranian regime imported Chinese internet censorship technology in May 2026.

=== White list ===
During 2026 Internet blackout part of its two-tiered selective access Iranian regime employed a white list with only having handful of websites unblocked nationally, with people having to use pricey Internet Pro, or advanced anti censorship VPNs software programs and satellite TV signals to receive and decrypt hidden internet data.

Namely available limited access has been opened to National Institutes of Health, Google search, DeepSeek, Playstation.com

- Steampowered.com
- XBOX.com
- App Store
- Yahoo!
- Call of Duty
- Threads
- Notion
- Canva
- Wikipedia
- Nextjs

=== Ratelimit (Global cloudflare proxy only DNS hijacking) ===
- Spotify
- Grok
- ChatGPT
- Anthropic Claude

=== Blacklist ===
Below is an estimated list of well-known websites blocked by Iran:

- Top world sites

Github and Akamai and Let's Encrypt were blocked later in May 2026.

- File hosting:
  - Videos: YouTube, Twitch, Dailymotion, Vimeo, Nico Video, Newgrounds
  - Images: Flickr, Pinterest, DeviantArt, Shutterstock, Dreamstime, 9gag
  - Software: ApkPure, Uptodown
  - Torrent indexing: The Pirate Bay
- Social media: Facebook, Twitter, TikTok, Reddit, Threads, Instagram
- News: Deutsche Welle, BBC, NDTV, CNN
- Messaging: Telegram, Facebook Messenger, Signal, Discord
- Music: YouTube Music
- Entertainment: Netflix, Zhanqi
- Link management platform: Bitly
- Sexual content (porn): all pornography sites

It is speculated that 90% of Iranians remain on social media despite government restrictions.

== Effects and Internet fragmentation ==
=== Effects ===
The government's censorship techniques has led to internet in Iran being among the worst worldwide, according to a report by the Tehran Electronic Commerce Association (TECA). The report noted the effect of new filtering equipment within the domestic network, which causes functional disruptions and processor saturation.

=== Forking apps ===
The Iranian government had passed another law in 2024 that allow censored apps to be accessible through government enabled client-side forks.

=== Elite internet ===
Minister of communications offered selling class "professional" based internet access to startups and corporations with less restrictions. IRNA defended the internet closed access.

The Iranian state spokesman compared the internet to arms control, while the Minister of Science Research and Technology promoted the mass censorship program as an "open internet for academics". The Minister of ICT also promised journalists that they would be granted internet access.

On 11 June 2023, the Minister of Tourism and Cultural Heritage demanded that foreign tourists should be allowed unfiltered Internet access whilst visiting Iran, via 'tourist' SIM cards. This plan was subsequently approved by the Iranian government in September 2023.

On 15 June 2023, the Minister of Communications denied copying Chinese Internet rules.

=== Cyber Freedom Areas for class-based authorized people ===
In May 2025, the Iranian authorities introduced the Cyber Freedom Areas for class-based authorized people to access internet without government censorship.

In June 2025, the Iranian regime cut the internet access for more than 60 hours. It also allowed a white list for a select group of government-approved individuals. In November 2025, the Iranian regime unblocked YouTube in certain universities, raising fears of worsened "digital apartheid". According to the US, the Islamic Republic spends at least $4 billion on suppression and internet censorship.

After the Israel-Iran war, Iran's judiciary chief, Gholam-Hossein Mohseni-Ejei, issued a nationwide cyber crackdown order and declared it a top priority. This included arrests and removals of Instagram pages of unveiled women and female singers, in order to win "in the front lines of culture war".

Since Jan 8 2026 military regime Iranian Armed Forces has shut down the internet and instead replaced it with "Filternet Plus" configuration domestic intranet, meanwhile 11 million Iranians had to use Psiphon VPN conduit bridges.

=== August 2023 easing for businesses and universities ===
In August 2023, the number of anonymous internet users in Iran rose.

The Minister of ICT claimed he was dissatisfied with the restrictions placed on speed, quality and the filtering of websites, proposing to whitelist some websites. A member of the Islamic Council's supervisory committee, part of a working group tasked with identifying instances of criminal online content, responded by noting fluctuations in website accessibility, mentioning that some sites were intermittently blocked or unfiltered based on the government's preferences. The Minister of Communications indicated a willingness to address these issues by considering selective removal of filters in certain contexts. Additionally, it was noted that various filtered websites remained accessible to specific groups such as students, university professors, and professionals in need of them for government-approved purposes.

A member of the Islamic Council's supervisory committee in the working group to determine examples of criminal computer content stated that some websites at some times were blocked and unfiltered according to requirements and that the opinion of the Minister of Communications was that action would be taken to remove the filter in some places. In addition, many sites that are normally filtered are available for classes, university professors, businessmen and all those who need it professionally.

In December 2022, the government unveiled plans to implement a program initially targeting students at the Sharif University of Technology, known as Goshayesh ("Opening"). Under this initiative, the Iranian government would allocate internet access levels to individuals, based on their social class. This would grant varying degrees of access to selected internet domains.

=== Persian language ===
The Persian language has been almost wiped out from the web because of censorship.

=== Department of Security, Integration, Innovation ===
The seventh development program ordered the government to incorporate a new department into Minister of ICT, called the Dept. Security, integration, innovation.

The Iranian government began training 500,000 personnel for cyberspace and video content. They claim that the operation of their program will have a positive economic impact.

== Punishment of dissidents ==
Lily Mazahery, a human rights and immigration lawyer who represents Iranian dissidents, reported that one of her clients was arrested after instant messaging with her. Ms. Mazahery said: "He told me he had received a call from the Ministry of Intelligence, and this guy when he went to the interrogation, they put in front of him printed copies of his chats with me. He said he was dumbfounded, and he was sent to prison."

== Funding ==
In September 2026 Islamic regime said they would still require 2000 billion toman to expand the National Information Network.

== Legal ==
In 2026 in one IRIB lawsuit ordered Aparat to pay 3,600 billion toman for video content on its website.

== Circumvention ==
Some of the most popular and widely used tools in Iran among VPNs includes ProtonVPN, Psiphon, Freegate, V2Ray, Wireguard, Lantern, Tor Browser, Warp+.

== Starlink ==
In the blackouts Starlink provided free internet to Iranians. Iranian regime has killed at least one individual for obtaining Starlink internet access. In October 2026 Islamic regime summoned Norway envoy over allowing Starlink to work in Iran. Ministry of Information Communication Technology threatened to cut power globally and cause blackout should Starlink work in Iran.

== US actions against Internet censorship ==
=== VOA proxy server ===
In 2003, Voice of America began to operate a proxy server for Iranian citizens, free of charge, along with internet privacy company Anonymizer and the International Broadcasting Bureau. Whenever the proxy is blocked, it uses a new IP address until that one is also blocked. Some websites and keywords related to pornography are blocked in the American proxy, although the list of banned words is publicly available. Non-pornographic websites may be inadvertently blocked; for example, the banning of ad blockers blocks access to the website of the United States Embassy.

=== US FREEDOM Act ===
The Feasibility Review of Emerging Equipment for Digital Open Media (FREEDOM) Act is a bipartisan bill introduced in the 119th United States Congress on 4 December 2025, aimed at evaluating technologies to enhance internet access in Iran amid ongoing government-imposed restrictions. The legislation seeks to address gaps in prior U.S. policy assessments by mandating a comprehensive review of emerging direct-to-cell satellite technologies and related tools that could enable circumvention of censorship and surveillance.

The FREEDOM Act builds on Section 5124 of the Fiscal Year 2025 National Defense Authorization Act (NDAA), which required the U.S. Department of State to submit a strategy for promoting internet freedom in Iran. Although the mandated report was delivered to congressional committees, it was critiqued for insufficient analysis of nascent technologies like direct-to-cell satellite systems, which allow standard smartphones to connect to low-Earth orbit satellites for messaging, calls, and limited data without dependence on terrestrial networks.

Internet access in Iran is subject to extensive state control, including widespread blocking of international platforms such as X (formerly Twitter), Facebook, YouTube, WhatsApp, and Telegram. The Iranian government employs recurrent shutdowns, AI-driven surveillance, and throttling of data speeds, often during periods of protest or dissent. A "white SIM card" program provides preferential, unfiltered connectivity to regime loyalists and officials, resulting in a stratified digital ecosystem characterized by critics as a form of "digital apartheid."

These measures are integrated into broader strategies of digital repression, which limit information flow, enable propaganda dissemination, and facilitate intimidation of dissidents. In response, international efforts have included calls from the European Parliament for technology companies to develop anti-censorship tools, such as open-source VPNs, encrypted proxies, and in-app bypass mechanisms. The act reviews the viability of direct-to-cell technologies in facilitating uncensored internet access in Iran.

In the House of Representatives, the bill was introduced by Rep. Claudia Tenney (R-NY-24) and Rep. Dave Min (D-CA-47), the latter representing a district with a significant Iranian-American population. A companion measure in the Senate was sponsored by Sen. Dave McCormick (R-PA) and Sen. Jacky Rosen (D-NV). House cosponsors include Reps. Yassamin Ansari (D-AZ-3), Maria Salazar (R-FL-27), Dan Goldman (D-NY-10), Brian Fitzpatrick (R-PA-1), Suhas Subramanyam (D-VA-10), Gus Bilirakis (R-FL-12), James Walkinshaw (D-VA-11), and Rob Wittman (R-VA-1).

=== IRAN Act ===
In February 2026, the group of congressmen including Senator McCormick and congresswoman Elvira Salazar introduced The IRAN Act (Internet Reach and Access Now Act) requiring FCC to refrain from disabling and blocking satellite coverage over the Iran .

=== United States sanctions ===
Following the 2009 Iranian presidential election, the US Senate ratified the Victims of Iranian Censorship Act (VOICE), which allocated US$50 million to fund measures "to counter Iranian government efforts to jam radio, satellite, and internet-based transmissions."

In 2018, the Trump administration increased American economic sanctions against Iran. These sanctions were not intended to prevent Iranian civilians from accessing basic internet services, but multiple American technology companies subsequently blocked access to their services in Iran. Iranian users who work with the Iranian government or are involved in terrorism were also sanctioned; technology suppliers risk prosecution by the US government if they sell web services to sanctioned users.

Identifying an internet user can be difficult, so some companies have entirely discontinued serving users in Iran. Apple's App Store and the messaging platform Slack have been unavailable in Iran since 2018. In 2019, access to free services on GitHub, GitLab, Amazon Cloud, and several video game services were also suspended. Such suspensions, however, may inadvertently strengthen censorship, although Amazon Cloud, another banned service, hosts most tools that help Iranians bypass the censorship filters. Internet developers have been forced to use less secure hosting tools, which leave websites vulnerable to cyberattacks and risk users' security.

These suspensions continue despite a General License D-1, first issued by the Office of Foreign Asset Controls (OFAC) in 2014, which authorizes private companies to provide certain "personal communications" technologies to users in Iran. When sanctions were re-imposed by the United States, the US Treasury Department highlighted that General License D-1 would help with "fostering internet freedom and supporting the Iranian people."

== See also ==
- Censorship in Iran
- 2017–2018 Iranian protests § Censorship
- 2019 Internet blackout in Iran
- 2025 Internet blackout in Iran
- 2026 Internet blackout in Iran
- Internet in Iran
- Mahsa Amini protests § Communications blackouts
- National Information Network of Iran
- Political repression in the Islamic Republic of Iran
