= Right to internet access =

View that all people must be able to access the internet

The right to internet access, also known as the right to broadband or freedom to connect, is the view that all people must be able to access the internet in order to exercise and enjoy their rights to freedom of expression and opinion and other fundamental human rights, that states have a responsibility to ensure that internet access is broadly available, and that states may not unreasonably restrict an individual's access to the internet.

== History ==
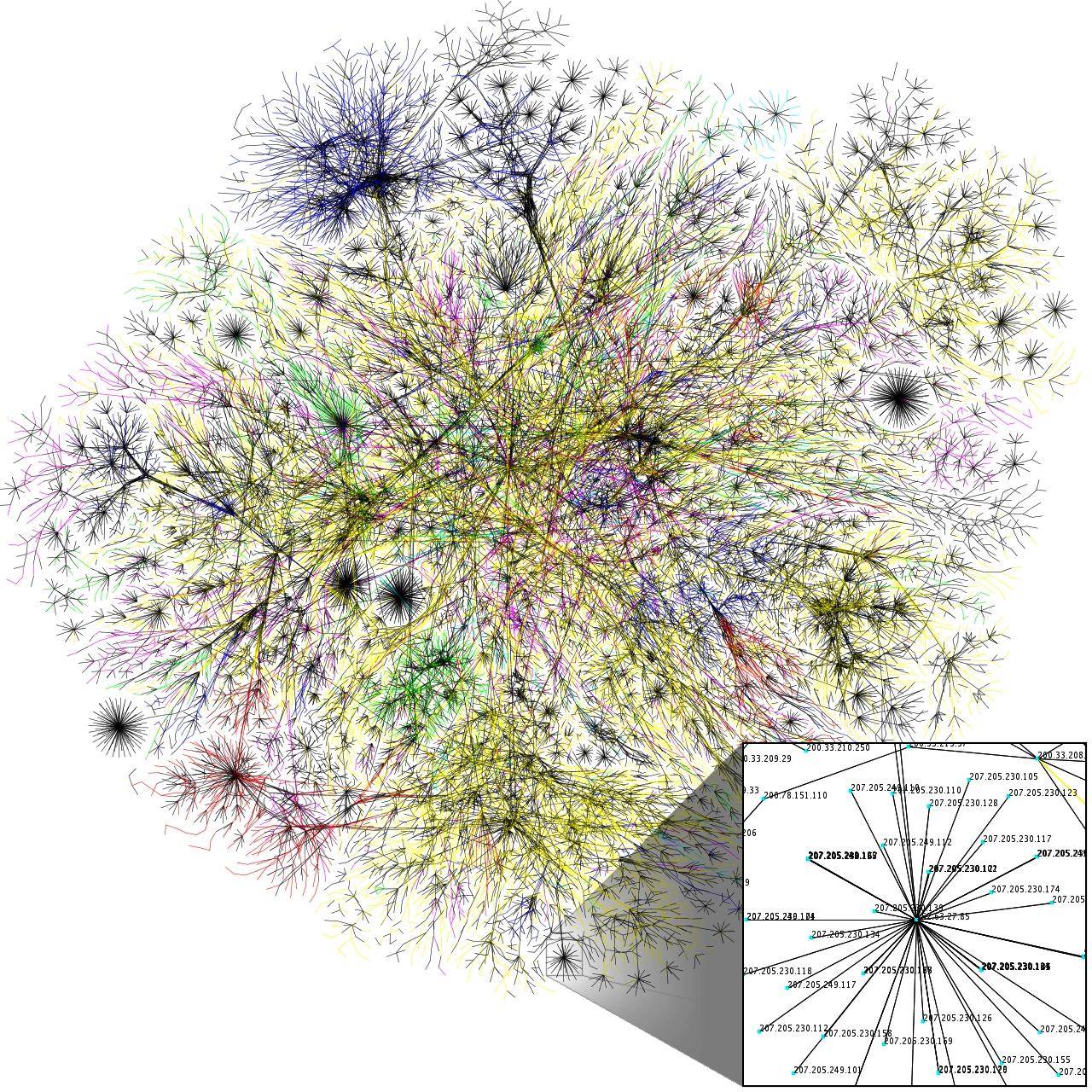
Internet map 1024 – transparent, inverted

In December 2003, the World Summit on the Information Society (WSIS) was convened under the auspice of the United Nations. After lengthy negotiations between governments, businesses, and civil society representatives, the WSIS Declaration of Principles was adopted, reaffirming the importance of the Information Society in maintaining and strengthening human rights:

1. We, the representatives of the peoples of the world, assembled in Geneva from 10–12 December 2003 for the first phase of the World Summit on the Information Society, declare our common desire and commitment to build a people-centred, inclusive and development-oriented Information Society, where everyone can create, access, utilize and share information and knowledge, enabling individuals, communities and peoples to achieve their full potential in promoting their sustainable development and improving their quality of life, premised on the purposes and principles of the Charter of the United Nations and respecting fully and upholding the Universal Declaration of Human Rights.

...

2. We reaffirm the universality, indivisibility, interdependence, and interrelation of all human rights and fundamental freedoms, including the right to development, as enshrined in the Vienna Declaration. We also reaffirm that democracy, sustainable development, and respect for human rights and fundamental freedoms as well as good governance at all levels are interdependent and mutually reinforcing. We further resolve to strengthen the rule of law in international in national affairs.

The WSIS Declaration of Principles makes specific reference to the importance of the right to freedom of expression in the "Information Society" in stating:

3. We reaffirm, as an essential foundation of the Information Society, and as outlined in Article 19 of the Universal Declaration of Human Rights, that everyone has the right to freedom of opinion and expression; that this right includes freedom to hold opinions without interference and to seek, receive and impart information and ideas through any media and regardless of frontiers. Communication is a fundamental social process, a basic human need, and the foundation of all social organizations. It is central to the Information Society. Everyone everywhere should have the opportunity to participate and no one should be excluded from the benefits the Information Society offers.

=== 2009–2010: BBC World Service poll ===
A poll of 27,973 adults in 26 countries, including 14,306 internet users, conducted for the BBC World Service between 30 November 2009 and 7 February 2010 found that almost four in five internet users and non-users around the world felt that access to the internet was a fundamental right. 50% strongly agreed, 29% somewhat agreed, 9% somewhat disagreed, 6% strongly disagreed, and 6% gave no opinion.

=== 2011: UN Special Rapporteur report ===
In May 2011, the United Nations Special Rapporteur on the promotion and protection of the right to freedom of opinion and expression, Frank La Rue, submitted a report to the UN Human Rights Council "exploring key trends and challenges to the right of all individuals to seek, receive and impart information and ideas of all kinds of media". The report made 88 recommendations on the promotion and protection of the right to freedom of expression online, including several to secure access to the internet for all. Other recommendations call on states to respect online anonymity, adopt privacy and data protection laws, and decriminalize defamation. La Rue's recommendations explained that:

- 67. Unlike any other medium, the Internet enables individuals to seek, receive and impart information and ideas of all kinds instantaneously and inexpensively across national borders. By vastly expanding the capacity of individuals to enjoy their right to freedom of opinion and expression, which is an "enabler" of other human rights, the Internet boosts economic, social, and political development, and contributes to the progress of humankind as a whole. In this regard, the Special Rapporteur encourages other Special Procedures mandate holders to engage on the issue of the Internet concerning their particular mandates.
- 78. While blocking and filtering measures deny users access to specific content on the Internet, States have also taken measures to cut off access to the Internet entirely. The Special Rapporteur considers cutting off users from Internet access, regardless of the justification provided, including on the grounds of violating intellectual property rights law, to be disproportionate and thus a violation of article 19, paragraph 3, of the International Covenant on Civil and Political Rights.
- 79. The Special Rapporteur calls upon all States to ensure that Internet access is maintained at all times, including during times of political unrest.
- 85. Given that the Internet has become an indispensable tool for realizing a range of human rights, combating inequality, and accelerating development and human progress, ensuring universal access to the Internet should be a priority for all States. Each State should thus develop a concrete and effective policy, in consultation with individuals from all sections of society, including the private sector and relevant Government ministries, to make the Internet widely available, accessible, and affordable to all segments of the population.

Media coverage of the report suggested that La Rue had declared internet access itself a human right by emphasizing that "the Internet has become a key means by which individuals can exercise their right to freedom and expression". In his report, La Rue stressed that "There should be as little restriction as possible to the flow of information via the Internet, except in a few, very exceptional, and limited circumstances prescribed by international human rights law." La Rue also emphasized that "any restriction must be provided by law and proven to be necessary and the least intrusive means available for protecting the rights of others".

=== Internet Society's Global Internet User Survey ===
In July and August 2012 the Internet Society conducted online interviews of more than 10,000 internet users in 20 countries. In response to the statement "Access to the Internet should be considered a basic human right":

- 83% responded that they somewhat or strongly agreed
- 14% that they somewhat or strongly disagreed
- 3% that they didn't know.

=== 2016: UN Resolution ===
In the Summer of 2016, the United Nations Human Rights Council released a non-binding resolution condemning intentional disruption of internet access by governments. The resolution reaffirmed that "the same rights people have offline must also be protected online."

== Ensuring that access is broadly available and preventing unreasonable restrictions ==
Several countries have adopted laws that require the state to work to ensure that internet access is broadly available, prevailing or preventing the state from unreasonably restricting an individual's access to information and the internet:

- Costa Rica: A 30 July 2010 ruling by the Supreme Court of Costa Rica stated: "Without fear of equivocation, it can be said that these technologies [information technology and communication] have impacted the way humans communicate, facilitating the connection between people and institutions worldwide and eliminating barriers of space and time. At this time, access to these technologies becomes a basic tool to facilitate the exercise of fundamental rights and democratic participation (e-democracy) and citizen control, education, freedom of thought and expression, access to information and public services online, the right to communicate with the government electronically and administrative transparency, among others. This includes the fundamental right of access to these technologies, in particular, the right of access to the Internet or World Wide Web."
- Estonia: In 2000, the parliament launched a massive program to expand access to the countryside. The internet, the government argues, is essential for life in the 21st century.
- Finland: In 2010, Finland was the first country in the world to grant its citizens the right to internet access in law. By July 2010, every person in Finland was to have access to a one-megabit per second broadband connection, according to the Ministry of Transport and Communications, and by 2015, access to a 100 Mbit/s connection.
- France: In June 2009, the Constitutional Council, France's highest court, declared access to the internet to be a basic human right in a strongly-worded decision that struck down portions of the HADOPI law, a law that would have tracked abusers and without judicial review automatically cut off-network access to those who continued to download illicit material after two warnings.
- Greece: Article 5A of the Constitution of Greece states that all persons have a right to participate in the Information Society and that the state must facilitate the production, exchange, diffusion, and access to electronically transmitted information.
- India: In September 2019, Kerala High Court held that the right to have access to the internet is part of the fundamental Right to Education as well as the Right to Privacy under Article 21 of the Constitution.
- Spain: Starting in 2011, Telefónica, the former state monopoly that holds the country's "universal service" contract, has to guarantee to offer "reasonably" priced broadband of at least one megabit per second throughout Spain.

== Links to other rights ==
=== Right to freedom of speech ===
The right to internet access is closely linked to the right of freedom of speech which can be seen to encompass freedom of expression as well. Two key facets of the internet are highlighted by Stephanie Borg Psaila – the Internet's content and the Internet's infrastructure. The infrastructure is necessary to deliver the service to the masses but requires extensive positive action. The content loaded onto the Internet however is seen as something that should be available to all, with few or no restrictions; limits on content have been viewed as the key breach of human rights, namely the right to freedom of speech.

The internet's power is said to lie in its removal of a government's control of information. Online on the internet, any individual can publish anything, which allows citizens to circumvent the government's official information sources. This has threatened governing regimes and lead to many censoring or cutting internet services in times of crisis.

China and Iran are currently the two world's largest censorship users. Both nations use extensive firewall systems to block any information from the internet which they perceive to be offensive or threatening to their regimes. If a citizen of these nations is caught dissenting from the nation using the internet then they may face severe penalties, even the removal of civil liberties.

In contrast to this, censorship which has been initiated by the United States is focused more on the protection of intellectual property. While the right to a proportion of one's ideas is recognized, there is widespread fear that wide-ranging powers awarded in anti-piracy laws will lead to the abuse of freedom of expression and censorship.

The removal or censorship of the internet in turn could be seen as a breach of the human right of freedom of speech.

One such particular incident was in Egypt, where the government of Hosni Mubarak shut down the internet several times during the 2011 uprising in an attempt to suppress the protests, which happened during the Arab Spring. Even though services were only cut off for a few days, this stifled Egyptians' ability to access basic services – such as ambulances – which has been blamed by some for escalating the death toll of protesters. In response to this, Google and Twitter developed a voice mail service for Egyptians to leave messages which in turn were posted onto Twitter.

In the report to the OSCE on internet access as a fundamental human right, Professor Yaman Akdenian states that the right to freedom of expression must be universal including the technology which will enable it. Restrictions on this right and any mediums required to fulfill it should only be permitted if they comply with international norms and are balanced again the public interest. Furthermore, the author noted that new technologies which arise in aiding the freedom of expression will require new approaches. Thus rules governing the use of non-digital media cannot be assumed to apply to digital media too. Furthermore, it was also noted in the paper presented to the OSCE that extra measures should be taken to ensure vulnerable groups such as children have access to the internet and literacy programs.

=== Right to development ===
The right to development is a third-generation right recognized by the UN General Assembly. The internet's role in securing this right has been noted by human rights scholars and activists in several ways. The increasing access to technology such as mobile phones has already proven to provide developing nations with further economic development opportunities. Increasing access to the internet can, for example, improve low-income individuals' access to financial services such as savings accounts and enable online trading.

The UN Special Rapporteur on the promotion and protection of the right to freedom of opinion and expression, Frank La Rue, in his 2011 report to the UN Human Rights Council emphasized that "without Internet access, which facilitates economic development and the enjoyment of a range of human rights, marginalized groups and developing States remain trapped in a disadvantaged situation, thereby perpetuating inequality both within and between States". La Rue's report led to arguments that to secure internet access as a human right and to facilitate every nation's economic development, governments should act to ensure universal access, just as governments should act to ensure access to utilities such as water and electricity. The advocacy group A Human Right estimated in 2012 that 4.6 billion people worldwide did not have internet access and that increasing access to the internet by just 10% could add 1.28–2.5% to the GDP of developing countries.

=== Right to freedom of assembly ===
Traditionally the right to freedom of assembly covered peaceful gatherings such as protests in physical public spaces, but technological innovation has continued to change the way people meet and interact. U.S. Secretary of State Hillary Rodham Clinton has stated, "cyber space, after all, is the public square of the 21st century." There has been an increase in the relevance of internet and the right to freedom of assembly.

The internet has become a useful tool in the organization of protest movements and demonstrations. Without the contribution of the internet and social media networks such as Twitter and Facebook, recent political events such as the Arab Spring could not have occurred, or at least not to the same extent. The role these mediums had were to allow the communication and mass dispatch of protests and other movements.

Internet access was also pivotal in the Occupy movement. A collective of journalists involved in the movement stated in regards to access to internet, "[a]ccess to open communications platforms is critical for the human species evolution and survival".

== Implications and complications ==
=== Implementation ===
Internet Connectivity Access layer

Implementing the right to internet access can be accomplished by requiring that universal service providers provide a mandatory minimum connection capability to all desiring home users in the regions of the country they serve.

Much of the Spanish-speaking world has celebrated Internet Day since 2005, including many initiatives of increasing network access. Panama has 214 "infoplazas" which are places of free internet access. (from Hoy (from Ecuador) on 17 May 2011, called "Derechos Humanos y accesso de la red central celebracion del Dia de Internet".)

=== Critiques of the human right to internet access ===
High-profile criticism of the notion that access to the internet should be considered a human right comes from Vint Cerf who is often dubbed one of the "fathers of the Internet". Cerf claims that internet access cannot be a right in itself. Cerf sums up his argument when he states "Technology is an enabler of rights, not a right itself." Amnesty International has seen this as a narrow interpretation.

Cerf concedes the internet plays an important role in civil participation which leads him to conclude that internet access should be a civil right, but he does not agree with it being afforded the higher status of a human right.

This article has sparked much debate online about the scope of human rights and whether internet access should be afforded that status.

Cerf notes that the positive act of providing internet access would be too onerous on governments and in any case governments do not have a duty to provide all their citizens with access to other forms of communication such as telephones. Egyptian human rights activist Sherif Elsayed-Ali argues that the notion of rights have the ability to change as social contexts change. He claims that one must look at right in the context of complete denial to the world population of that right would lead to a detriment in the quality of life. Elsayed-Ali claims that without the internet humanity would be taking a step back in its development, with news and innovation in crucial sectors, such as health and technology, taking much longer to spread across the globe.

There has also been criticism of Cerf's framing of the internet as something less important than the right to "freedom from torture or freedom of conscience", as it might be better compared to other basic human rights like those found in Article 25 of the UDHR, notably "the right to a standard of living … including food, clothing, housing and medical care and necessary social services". A Human Right, a non-profit organization, also took issue with Cerf's belief that placing technology in the pantheon of human rights is a mistake because "we will end up valuing the wrong things". They argue that "The potpourri of protocols, wires, and bits that make the Internet are no more special than the hammer and nails used to build a home, and to classify either as a human right would be a sincere mistake. But just as a home is much more than the sum of its parts, so is the Internet."

Brian Schepis, a colleague of Cerf at Google, defends Cerf's conclusion on the grounds that advocates for a human right to the iinternet improperly define the qualifications of a human right. Schepis argues that human rights should only protect things that are instrumentally necessary for membership in a political community and, although the internet is instrumentally valuable for membership, it should not be seen as a human right in and of itself because it is not necessary for membership. In claiming a human right to the internet, advocates devalue the overall effectiveness of human rights as tools of justification in the global political arena through a process called "human rights inflation".

Others have argued that it is ridiculous to consider internet access a human right, as that would mean that all human beings up until the invention of the internet were deprived of a basic human right, which would be an impossibility if it is a natural, inalienable right.

Others point to the fact that it is not the internet itself which is the right but rather the access to the internet which should be an enshrined right. The European Union's European Commission Vice President Viviane Reding stated that "The rules therefore provide that any measures taken regarding access to or use of, services and applications must respect the fundamental rights and freedoms of natural persons, including the right to privacy, freedom of expression and access to information and education as well as due process." (Emphasis added) The removal of this right through censorship or the denial of service could amount in a breach to several human rights which are fulfilled through online participation.

La Rue thus emphasizes "Each state should thus develop a concrete and effective policy to make the Internet widely available, accessible, and affordable to all segments of population."

=== Three strikes ===
In response to copyright infringement using peer-to-peer software, the creative industries, reliant on copyright, advocate what is known as a "graduated response" which sees consumers disconnected after a number of notification letters warning that they are infringing copyright. The content industry has sought to gain the co-operation of internet service providers (ISPs), asking them to provide subscriber information for IP addresses identified by the content industry as engaged in copyright infringement. The proposal for internet service providers to cut off internet access to a subscriber who had received three warning letters of alleged copyright infringement was initially known as "three strikes", based on the baseball rule of "three strikes and you're out". The approach was later termed "graduated response". Media attention has focused on attempts to implement such an approach in France (see the HADOPI law) and the UK (see the Digital Economy Act 2010), though the approach, or variations of it, has been implemented in a number of other countries, or attempts are made to do so.

=== Future regulation of the internet ===
The internet as a whole is seen as a medium which is outside of any one state's jurisdiction, while portions of the internet are subject to laws and regulations of the countries in which they operate. Going forward, international dialogue has begun on how the internet should be regulated.

Human rights activists are lobbying for any regulation on the internet to be in the form of protections of rights rather than in limiting access to the internet. Any attempt to regulate "harmful" or illegal activities online can face difficulties as states differ in their definitions of both.

=== Breadth of ensured provision ===
The type and breadth of access which is ensured by an enshrined right can also widely vary, with governments which have pursued an enshrinement of a right to broadband often setting seemingly-adequate minimum targets of speed, number of home connections, type of provision, etc.

== See also ==
- Digital divide
- Freedom of information
  - Global digital divide
- Global Internet Freedom Task Force (GIFT) – An initiative within the U.S. Department of State
- Global internet usage
- Internet censorship
  - Internet censorship by country
  - 2019, 2025, 2026 internet blackout in Iran
- Open access
