= National Information Network =

Iranian intranet network

National Information Network of Iran
- Native name: شبکه ملی اطلاعات
- Formerly: National internet
- Type: National intranet, Government project
- Industry: Computer network
- Founded: 2016; 10 years ago
- Area served: Islamic Republic of Iran
- Key people: Mohammad Hasan Sadr,Mohammad-Javad Azari Jahromi, Abolhassan Firouzabadi,Sattar Hashemi,Mahmoud Vaezi,Vahid Yazdanian Rasoul Saraian
- Owner: IRGC, Government of the Islamic Republic of Iran
- ASNs: 12880; 197207; 44244
- Traffic Levels: 18000 Gbit/s
- Website: rrk.ir/Laws/ShowLaw.aspx?Code=22455 https://web.archive.org/web/20120511174429/http://matma.ir/matma/images/files/INN_Summery_2.pdf

The National Information Network (NIN; Persian: شبکۀ ملی اطلاعات, romanized: Shabake-ye Melli-ye Ettelā'āt), also known as National Internet in Iran and the Iranian intranet, is an Iranian ongoing project backed by IRGC to develop a secure, stable, and controlled infrastructure network and national intranet in Iran.

The Supreme Council of Cyberspace defines the NIN as "a network based on the Internet Protocol with switches and routers and data centers which allows for data requests to avoid being routed outside of the country and provides secure and private intranet networks."

It is a domestic network which connects to the external internet via a government controlled gateway. This allows the Iranian government to control and filter traffic between people in Iran and the outside world.

== History ==
The idea of a national intranet was developed at the Ministry of Information and Communication Technology in 2005, and the project started in 2013. It is based on the Fifth Economic Development Plan of Iran.

The Iranian government allocated about $200 million to develop NIN infrastructures alongside NIN e-content. Iranian president Hassan Rouhani signed an engineering program in September 2020. According to the Iranian government, one of the NIN's main objectives is to break the monopoly of the Internet.

Cisco Systems were deprecated and replaced primarily to achieve full independence from foreign technology and to enhance security following a high-profile cyberattack.

Iranian seventh quinquennial development program directed the Ministry of ICT to make it to 99% of the network within five years.

During the 2025-26 protests, all internet was shut off in Iran, including the NIN.

== Technical features ==
The National Information Network's two main parts are:

- A public sector for delivering NIN services to public and business users
- A private sector for delivering NIN services to governmental users.

Everyone is identified by their social ID and telephone numbers before being able to access the network or internet through the network.

It is a domestic network which connects to the external internet. It regulates autonomous systems using the Border Gateway Protocol (BGP) and separates internal and external traffic. When Iranians connect to the internet, they are automatically connected to the NIN.

The NIN manages the .ir domain name and can identify owners of websites. Parents can request the NIN to filter what websites their children can access.

Corporations are required to use only Iranian data centers and register their IP address.

NIN can be used in a similar way as China's Great Firewall. The NIN can be configured to allow Iranians to only access domestic websites and not foreign websites. It can be configured to allow banks and organizations to access the external internet during times of internal crises.

In 2019, Ayatollah Mohammad Ali Movahedi Kermani in Tehran declared in a Friday prayer that Telegram is haram and requested the NIN to be implemented.

== Circumvention ==
- Domain fronting

== Critics ==
Iranian regime Presidential spokesperson Hazrati, Minister of ICT and Dept Ministry of Science have criticised the internet blackout and the network.

== Deployment ==
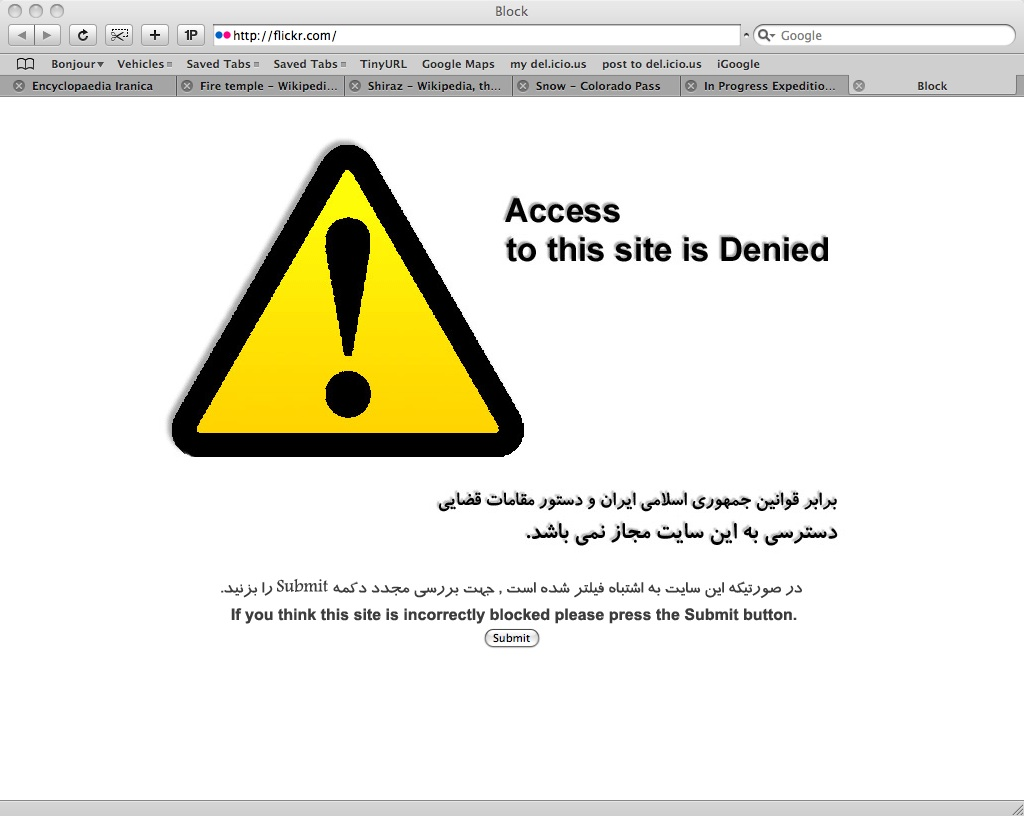
Flickr censorship in 2008

The Iranian government fully implemented the NIN between 15 and 27 November 2019, during the 2019 Internet blackout in Iran.

== See also ==
- Communications in Iran#Internet
- Censorship in Iran
- Internet censorship in Iran
  - 2019 Internet blackout in Iran
  - 2025 Internet blackout in Iran
  - 2026 Internet blackout in Iran
- National knowledge network
