= Elections in Iran =

Iran elects on a national level a head of government (the president), a legislature (the Majlis), and an "Assembly of Experts" (which elects the Supreme Leader). City and Village Council elections are also held every four years throughout the entire country. The president is elected for a four-year term by the citizens. The Parliament or Islamic Consultative Assembly (Majlis-e Shura-ye Eslami) currently has 290 members, also elected for a four-year term in multi- and single-seat constituencies. Elections for the Assembly of Experts are held every eight years. All candidates have to be approved by the Guardian Council. See Politics of Iran for more details.

Until January 2007, when it was raised to 18, the voting age was 15 years, the lowest globally at the time.

The most recent Iranian presidential election was held on 28 June 2024 and the most recent legislative election on 1 March 2024.

== Latest elections ==
=== 2024 presidential election ===
Candidate	Party or alliance		First round		Second round	
Candidate	Party or alliance		Votes	%	Votes	%
Masoud Pezeshkian	Independent	Reformists	10,415,991	44.36	16,384,403	54.76
Saeed Jalili	Independent	Principlists	9,473,298	40.35	13,538,179	45.24
Mohammad Bagher Ghalibaf	Progress and Justice Population of Islamic Iran	Principlists	3,383,340	14.41		
Mostafa Pourmohammadi	Combatant Clergy Association	Principlists	206,397	0.88		
Total			23,479,026	100.00	29,922,582	100.00
Valid votes			23,479,026	95.70	29,922,582	98.01
Invalid/blank votes			1,056,159	4.30	607,575	1.99
Total votes			24,535,185	100.00	30,530,157	100.00
Registered voters/turnout			61,452,321	39.93	61,452,321	49.68
Source: ISNA, IranIntl, Tejarat News

=== 2024 Assembly of Experts election ===
2024 Iranian Assembly of Experts election
- 1 March 2024
- Turnout: 40%-41%
Party	Leader	Vote %	Seats	+/–
Principlists	Movahedi Kermani	65.91	58	−7
Reformists	-	2.27	2	−17
Independents	-	31.82	28	+24
This lists parties that won seats. See the complete results below.
Composition of the Assembly of Experts after election
Chairman before	Chairman after
Ahmad Jannati	Mohammad-Ali Movahedi Kermani

=== 2024 legislative election ===
Party	Votes	%	Seats
Coalition Council of Islamic Revolution Forces			107
People's Alliance of Islamic Revolution			79
Voice of the Nation			47
Unity Council			13
Independents			39
Seats reserved for religious minorities			5
Total			290
Total votes	24,861,542	–	
Registered voters/turnout	61,172,298	40.64	
Source: Isna, Guardian

== See also ==
- Censorship in Iran
- Democracy in the Middle East and North Africa#Iran
- Iran Electoral Archive
- List of political parties in Iran#Opposition parties active in exile
- Mojtaba Khamenei (the recdent elected supreme leader of Iran)
