= Nashravaran Journalistic Institute =

Iranian censorship agency

Nashravaran Journalistic Institute is the Iranian government agency that handles censorship of international magazines and books.
