= Internet Day =

Day to promote the importance of information and communications technology

Internet Day (Spanish: Día de Internet) is an event observed in Spain and various Latin American countries (Mexico, Peru, Chile, Paraguay, Argentina, Colombia, Uruguay, Ecuador, Bolivia, Venezuela), and other parts of the world on May 17 to commemorate World Internet Day.

Internet Day was held for the first time on October 25, 2005, promoted by the Association of Internet Users. Shortly after, the World Summit on the Information Society (WSIS), which convened in Tunis in November 2005, decided to suggest to the UN, at the urging of the Association of Internet Users, an Internet Day to celebrate the internet across the globe.

The UN agreed to designate May 17 as a day dedicated to telecommunications, including World Telecommunication and Information Society Day, to promote the importance of information and communications technology and the diverse issues related to information society that the WSIS brought up. In March 2006, the General Assembly adopted Resolution A/RES/60/252, which proclaimed that World Telecommunications and Information Society would be held annually on May 17.

== The idea ==
The initiative for Internet Day was started by the Asociación de Usuarios de Internet (lit. 'Association of Users of the Internet') in Spain as an online project of society, by society, and for society, with the goal of making known the possibilities of the new technologies to improve the standard of living, to which end they added different associations of Spain with whom they saw interest in sharing, on some date, what they do to bring the information society to all of the citizens.

Around this date, 17 of May, there are held through the world various activities and events to promote the advantages and good use of the Internet between all of the groups.

== Development ==
The celebration of Internet Day in its first iteration took place 25 October 2005 in Spain. On that date, there were carried out more than 400 events in more than 8,000 places in 31 provinces of the 17 autonomous communities. More than 200 public and private entities subscribed to la Declaración de Principios [the Declaration of Principles] for constructing the information society, representing more than a million citizens.

In Spain the organization of Internet Day is formed by: la Oficina Técnica [the Technical Office] (Asociación de Usuarios de Internet); el Comité de Impulso [the Driving Committee], where they integrate the most relevant social agents (Administrations, associations, federations, universities, colleges, syndicates, political parties, etc.); los Promotores [the Promoters], who develop events and activities; los Patrocinadores [the Patrons] who, with their economic assistance, facilitate the financing of the project; and los Comunicadores [the Communicators], who contribute to its dissemination. Some of the activities that most stand out include el Acto Central del Día Mundial [the Central Act of the Worldwide Day], an event that is done every year in the Senate of Spain in which invited experts give their point of view and debate over a topic related to the Internet, and los Premios de Internet [the Prizes of the Internet], awards that recognize the initiatives, people, or organizations that have stood out most in the digital world.

In Latin America the initiative of Día Mundial de Internet [World Internet Day] was well received, so now the following organizations are associated together: la Asociación Colombiana de Usuarios de Internet [the Colombian Association of Internet Users], la Asociación Mexicana de Internet [the Mexican Internet Association], la Asociación Argentina de Usuarios de Internet (Internauta Argentina) [the Argentinian Association of Internet Users (Internet-astronaut / Netizen Argentina)], la Asociación Chilena de Usuarios de Internet [the Chilean Association of Internet Users], in Ecuador and Peru it's organized and coordinated by REIDTIC, in El Salvador it's organized and coordinated over a week, by Conexión and SVNet, and in Venezuela the technical office is managed by Manos por la Niñez y adolescencia [Hands for Childhood and adolescence].

In Colombia la Asociación Colombiana de Usuarios de Internet [the Colombian Association of Internet Users] has as an institutional mission to promote the diffusion of, understanding of, use of, and benefit from the technologies of information and communications and, in particular, the Internet in the country.

Chile has been present since the first year in which the initiative commenced (2005), being the first country at the Latin American level to propel and celebrate Internet Day. In Chile the organization that is tasked with developing this event is Internauta Chile [Internet-astronaut Chile], who via a congress, the giving of los Premios Internauta [the Internet-astronaut Prizes], and events at a national level, have accomplished positioning this activity. From Internauta Chile there have emerged projects such as los Hermanamientos Digitales [the Digital Tools], la campaña Hablemos el mismo e-dioma [the campaign We Speak the same e-language], itinerant cycles of Cine Geek [Cinema Geek], las Academias de Cibervoluntarios y Corresponsales Web [the Academies of Cyber-volunteers and Web Correspondents], la Unidad Coordinadora de la Sociedad de la Información [the Coordinating Union of the Information Society], among others. Stands out the giving of los Premios Internauta, a prize that is given to the technosocial initiatives that develop in the country.

In Argentina, they carry out journeys (in-person and virtual) that tell the agenda of conferences by internet with debate forums and live chats with recognized national and international experts and a collaborative online environment of interaction.

In Bolivia, they develop chats about achievements using internet, having present that Bolivia was the country where the internet is the slowest in the world and the most expensive of South America.

== Participation ==
All of the world is invited to participate in Internet Day. There are diverse ways to participate and contribute. In many cities they carry out events that commemorate said day, organized by business enterprises, administrations, and organizations of whatever type and size, that need to achieve the following conditions:

- That bring closer the information society to all of the citizens.
- That their main realization occurs the 17th of May.
- That they are made known on www.diadeinternet.org.

== Antecedents ==
This celebration has its first antecedent in the celebration of the World Telecommunication and Information Society Day, an annual event centered on this profession and its professionals, subsequently in the 1990s in the United States they celebrated the "Internet Day" with the concrete objective of dedicating a festive journey to cabling the schools and it stopped taking place once that problem was solved.

In the mid-1990s arises in France La fête de l’internet [The celebration of the internet], an event that is continued to be celebrated annually in mid-March every year and centered on the francophone countries.

The European Union established in the year 2004 the Safer Internet Day with the objective of making understood how to make an Internet that's more secure and trustworthy. This action supported by various countries of the EU repeated its realization in the year 2005.

The initiative of Internet Day arises, in Spain, in the year 2004, on the basis of a proposal of la Asociación de Usuarios de Internet, in that they bring together different organizations, having their first celebration of Internet Day in 2005 on the 25th of October that year with notable success of participation.

Article 121 of the document of conclusions of la Cumbre Mundial de la Sociedad de la Información [the Worldwide Summit of the Information Society], celebrated in Tunisia:

Es necesario contribuir a que se conozca mejor Internet para que se convierta en un recurso mundial verdaderamente accesible al público. Hacemos un llamamiento para que la AGNU declare el 17 de mayo Día Mundial de la Sociedad de la Información, que se celebrará anualmente y servirá para dar a conocer mejor la importancia que tiene este recurso mundial en las cuestiones que se tratan en la Cumbre, en especial, las posibilidades que puede ofrecer el uso de las TIC a las sociedades y economías, y las diferentes formas de colmar la brecha digital.

transl.:

It is necessary to contribute to making known a better Internet so that it is converted into a worldwide resource truly accessible to the public. We are making a call for the UNGA to declare the 17th of May Día Mundial de la Sociedad de la Información [Worldwide Day of the Information Society], that will be celebrated annually and serve to make better known the importance that this worldwide resource has in the issues that the Summit was about, especially the possibilities that can be offered by the use of ICT to the societies and economies, and the different ways to meet the digital divide.

== See also ==
- Right to Internet access
- Digital rights
