= Hamid Shahriari =

Iranian cleric

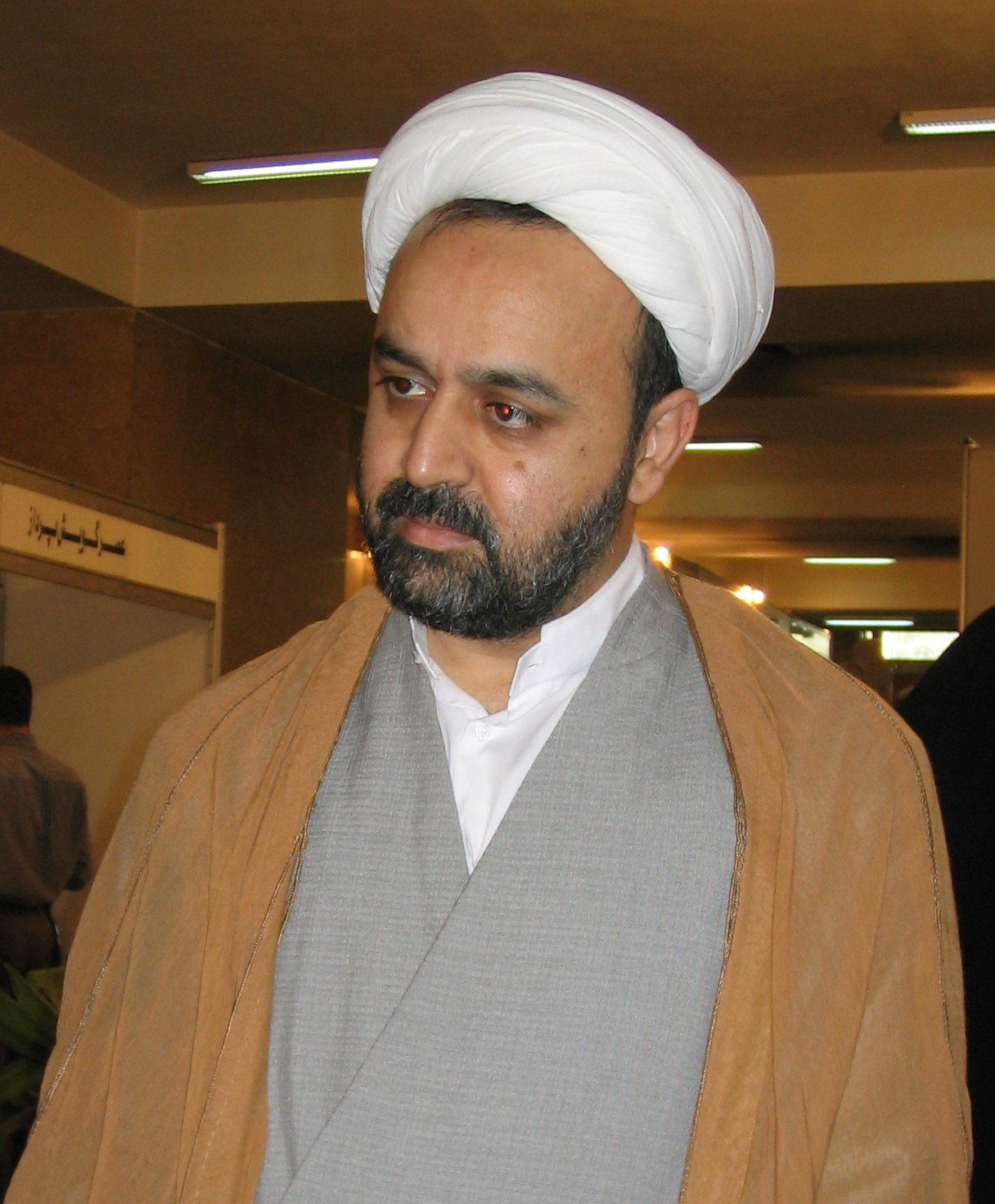
Image of Hamid-shahriari

Hamid Shahriari (Persian: حمید شهریاری) (born: 1963, Tehran); complete name: "Hamid Hawali Shahriari" (Persian: حمید حوالی شهریاری) is an Iranian Twelver Shia cleric who has recently been appointed as the general secretary of The World Forum for Proximity of Islamic Schools of Thought by the decree of Iran's supreme leader, Seyyed Ali Khamenei—instead of Mohsen Araki.

Shahriari (also known as "Hujjatul-Islam Shahriari") was the head of "the Center for Statistics and Informatics" in Judicial system of Iran, and was also the head of "the center of computer research Islamic sciences". He was likewise a member of the supreme council of cyberspace.

This Iranian cleric, went to Qom Seminary in 1981, and finished his seminary studies in 6 years. He was busy in teaching in the lessons of seminary beside his education, and was also studying Arabic and English languages. After passing Hawzah education, he participated in the classes of teachers, amongst: Seyyed Kazem Haeri (Kazem al-Haeri) and Jawad Tabrizi for ten years at "the lesson(s) on Jurisprudence and Principles".

== See also ==
- The World Forum for Proximity of Islamic Schools of Thought
- Supreme Council of Cyberspace (Iran)
- Mohsen Araki
