= Iran Electoral Archive =

The Iran Electoral Archive (IEAr) is an online source of information about elections in Iran, comprising laws, official documents, academic articles and commentaries, both in English and in Persian. The key objective of the IEAr project is to provide a large variety of stakeholders with a broad and impartial look at the Iranian elections legal framework, history (from 1967 onwards) and current developments. The archive constitutes a unique and concrete answer to the scarcity of available information in this domain, addressing in a systematic and academic manner the controversial debate revolving around the Iranian electoral process.

The Scuola Superiore Sant’Anna, an Italian public university, has been running the project since 2009. All documents hosted on the Archive — more than 400 occurrences — have been selected by qualified and independent researchers, within and outside the Scuola, inspired by the principles of impartiality and independence, and boasting a proven track record of relevant investigations within the Iranian political and electoral history fields. Moreover, all uploads undergo a final approval by an independent external body.

The IEAr is structured in fourteen sections, each one of them corresponds to a given subject/topic: Iranian Constitution, Iranian Parliament, Iranian President, Iranian Elections Local Officials, Iranian Electoral Law and Bylaws, Iranian Political Parties, Iranian Media and Censorship, Election Technology, Iranian Dispute Resolution, Iranian Election History, Other Social and Institutional Actors, Iranian 2009 Presidential Election, Relevant Websites. Each section includes three subsections: official documents, relevant commentaries and selected articles.

Since 1996 the Scuola Superiore Sant'Anna has been involved worldwide in activities related to election training, assistance and monitoring as well as electoral research and studies. Promoting a better understanding of the legal, political and technical issues revolving around elections, globally and at country level, is the project’s ultimate goal.
