= Censorship during the 2026 Iran war =

During the 2026 Iran war, the United States, Israel and Iran all implemented severe censorship to hide their actual amount of damage and success in the war.

== United States ==
The U.S. government restricted information regarding the conflict with Iran through voluntary satellite imagery blackouts, seizing web domains and threatening media outlets. According to an NBCNews report, Iran caused "far worse" damage to U.S. military bases than was publicly known due to the U.S. government censorship. According to a report by The Washington Post, Iran's missile and drone strikes damaged or destroyed at least 228 structures or pieces of equipment at US military sites across West Asia. Among the targets identified through satellite imagery analysis were hangars, barracks, fuel depots, aircraft, and critical radar, communications, and air defense systems. The report said that Iran's air strikes rendered some of the US bases in the region too dangerous to US forces at normal levels, and commanders moved most of the personnel from these sites. The US had pressed major satellite firms Vantor and Planet to impose restrictions on imagery of the war zone — including delaying or withholding its release — making it difficult, if not impossible, to independently assess the impact of Iran's counterstrikes.

== Israel ==
Israel actively censored reporting on damage from Iranian attacks, using its military censor to restrict, modify or ban the publication of information regarding impact sites, military vulnerabilities and air defense readiness. Reporters had to submit footage and articles to the Israeli military censor (under the IDF Intelligence Corps) for review before publication during the 2026 Iran war.

== Iran ==
Iran enforced severe censorship by implementing near-total Internet blackouts, shifting traffic to a restricted domestic intranet and restricting independent journalism to hide damage and suppress dissent. Iran also maintained its longest Internet shutdown to hide true information regarding conflict damage, forcing citizens to rely on state-controlled narratives.
