= National intranet =

Large-scale intranet maintained by a nation-state as a substitute for the Internet

A national intranet is an Internet Protocol-based walled garden network maintained by a country as a national substitute for the global Internet, with the aim of controlling and monitoring the communications of its inhabitants, as well as restricting their access to outside media. Other names have been used, such as the use of the term halal internet in Iran.

Such networks generally come with access to state-controlled media and national alternatives to foreign-run Internet services including search engines, web-based email, and others.

== List of countries with active national intranets ==
=== China ===
China does not maintain a national intranet. Instead, it relies on selective blocking of foreign internet content, a system termed the Great Firewall, combined with censorship of content posted from within its borders, such as by blocking lists of "sensitive" keywords.

=== Cuba ===
Cuba has its own state-controlled intranet called national web.

=== North Korea ===
North Korea's Kwangmyong network, dating back to 2000, is the best-known of this type of network. Cuba and Myanmar also use a similar network system that is separated from the rest of the Internet. The network uses domain names under the .kp top-level domain that are not accessible from the global Internet. As of 2016, the network uses IPv4 addresses reserved for private networks in the 10.0.0.0/8 range.

=== Iran ===
The National Information Network of Iran works like the Great Firewall of China. In April 2011, a senior Iranian official, Ali Agha-Mohammadi announced government plans to launch its own "halal Internet", which would conform to Islamic values and provide "appropriate" services. Creating such a network, similar to the North Korean example, would prevent unwanted information from outside Iran getting into the closed system. The Iranian walled garden would have had its own localized email service and search engine. Iran conducted the longest internet shutdown in history, the 2026 Internet blackout in Iran, and imported internet censorship hardware from China.

=== Turkmenistan ===
Turkmenistan blocks foreign websites by ISP since 2009, including YouTube.

== List of countries with national intranets planned ==
=== Russia ===
In 2020, Russia tested a national, internal internet known as RuNet.

Since the invasion of Ukraine in February 2022, Russia has blocked almost all major platforms such as Facebook, Instagram, X, TikTok, Discord, Roblox, Telegram, YouTube and more due to the 2022 war censorship laws which criminalised the spread of “misinformation” about the war in Ukraine. Some of these platforms, such as Roblox, have been unbanned in the country.

== List of countries with defunct national intranets ==
=== Myanmar (pre-2011) ===
Myanmar, before 2011, while it was ruled by a military junta, used to have a separate intranet for domestic use called Myanmar Wide Web.

=== Tunisia (2007-2011) ===
During the regime of Zine El Abidine Ben Ali in Tunisia, foreign online platforms such as YouTube, Dailymotion, and Facebook were subject to filtration and censorship by the government. Upon his deposition amidst the Arab Spring protests, the government of acting president Fouad Mebazaa would terminate said censorship of these platforms.

== List of countries with scrapped national intranet proposals ==
=== Australia ===
In 2009, WikiLeaks exposed a proposal which would require ISPs to block websites and URLs that host “Refused Classification” (RC) content such as real and fictional child sexual abuse, illegal pornography or violent video games, the latter of which was banned until 2013, and to impose fines costing up to AU$11,000 per day for internet users sending or posting links banned in Australia. Critics worry that lawmakers may consider blocking entire platforms websites such as YouTube, X, and Reddit if they fail to take this content down. Following outcry, the proposal was repealed in 2012.

== See also ==
- Internet censorship by country
- Intranet
- Surveillance state
- Splinternet
- Internet censorship
- Great Firewall in China
