= Hossein Shanbehzadeh =

Iranian political prisoner

- حسین شنبه‌زاده
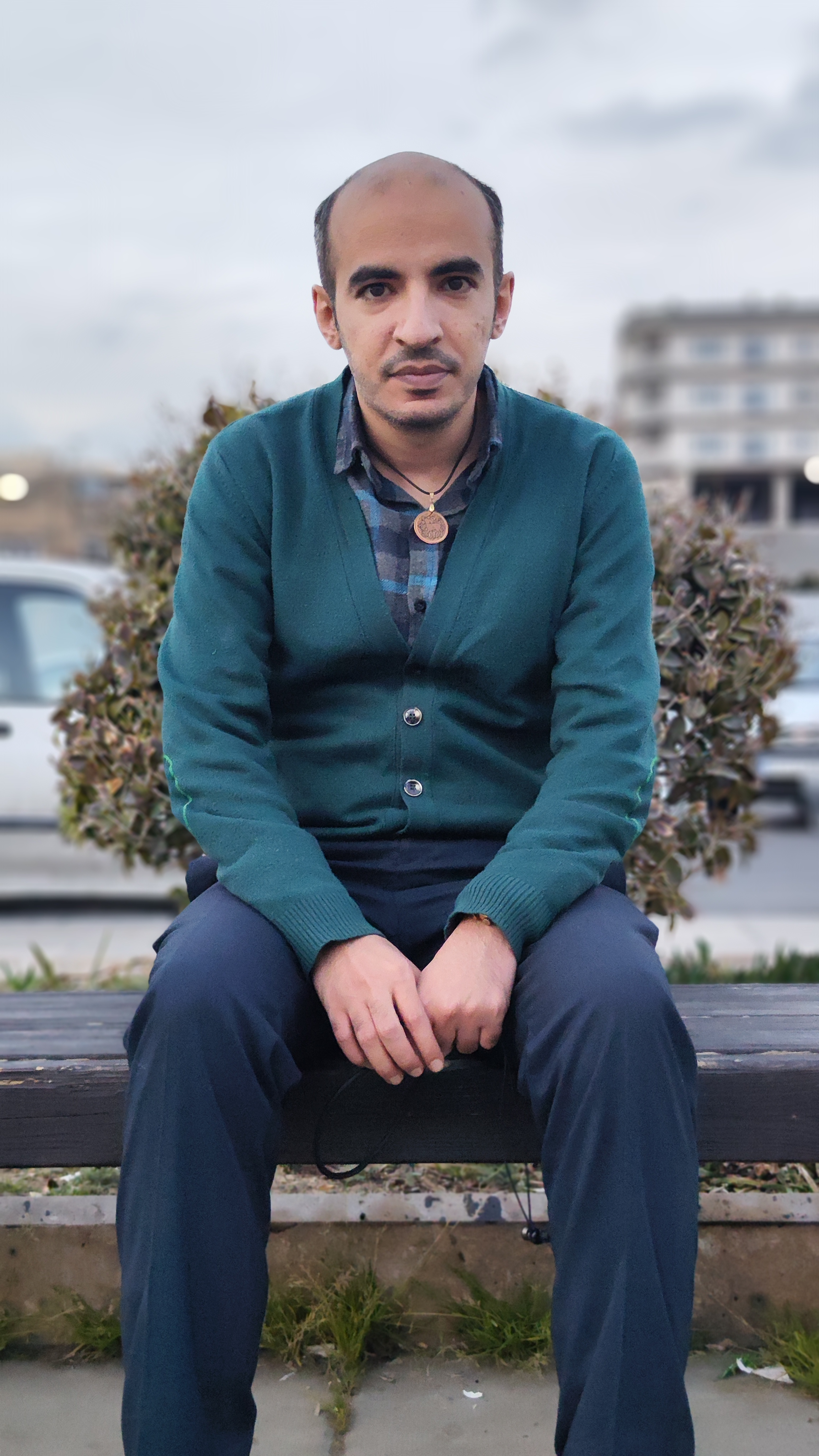
- Occupations: Writer, activist

Hossein Shanbehzadeh (Persian: حسین شنبه‌زاده) is an Iranian writer and activist. He was arrested in 2024 after tweeting a single period ("."). He is referred to as "Prisoner of the Dot", by some news outlets.

== Career ==
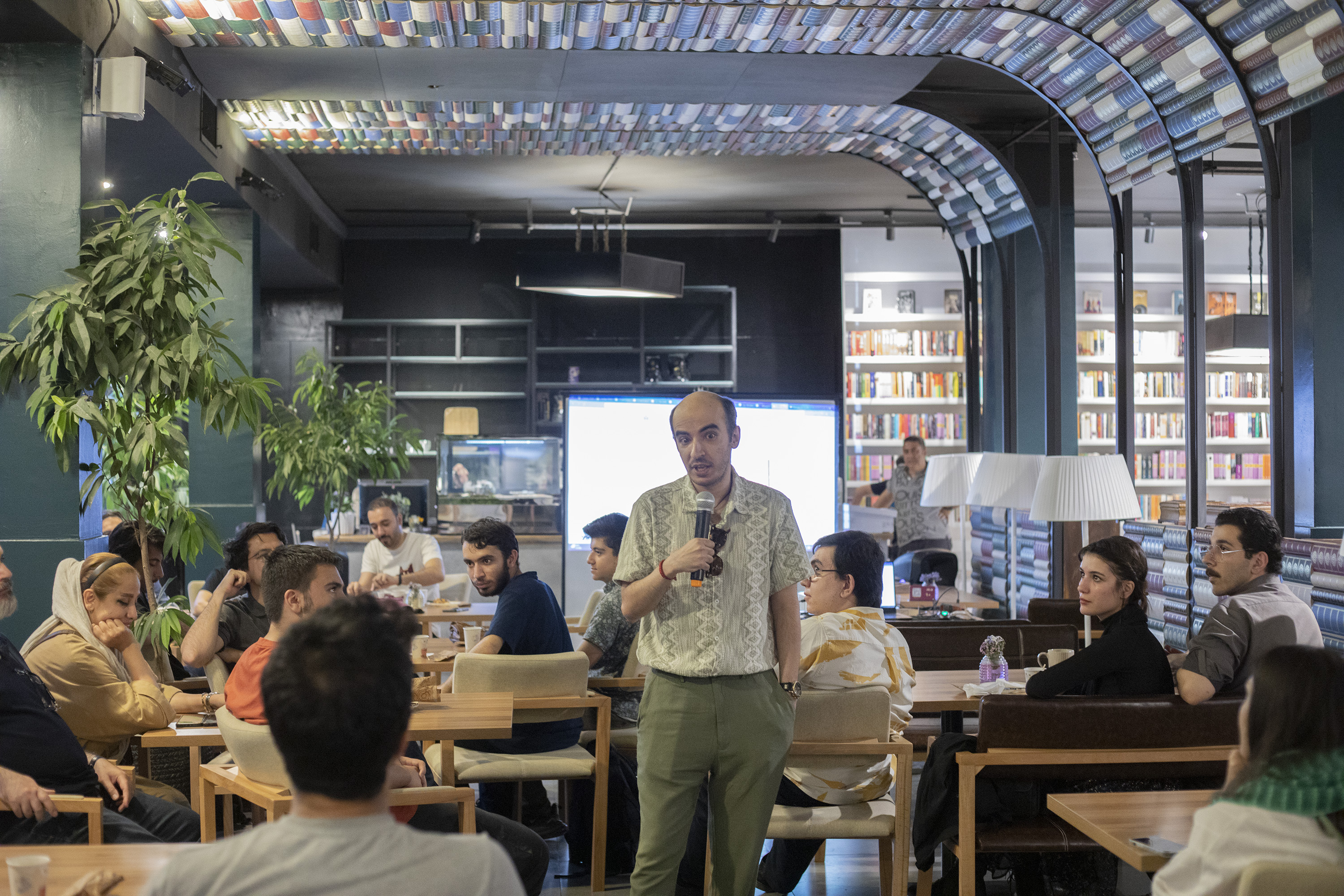
Shanbezadeh at Persian Wikipedia 1 Million article milestone ceremony - 16 May 2024

Hossein has worked as a translator, literary editor and activist. He has gained notoriety for his critical or satirical messages about the Iranian regime and Supreme Leader Ali Khamenei. In 2019 he was arrested in relation with the 2019 Iranian protests, charged with “insulting the sanctities and the leader of the Islamic Republic.”, He was imprisoned in Evin Prison and sentenced to six years in prison. He was released at the beginning of 2024, between March and April, before the end of his sentence.

== Arrest for a tweet ==
On 4 June 2024, Hossein was arrested again a month after he tweeted a period (“.”) in response to Ali Khamenei, which garnered significantly more likes and impact than Khamenei's original post. The writer had previously also posted an exposé about the harsh practices in Evin Prison. Multiple users expressed outrage in response to the arrest. Shanbehzadeh was accused by authorities of spying for Israel, a charge that could mean the death penalty. His whereabouts were unknown as of June 2024. Referring to him also as "Prisoner of the Dot", in June 2025, The Jerusalem Post reported that he was sentenced to 12 years in prison.
