= 2019 protests in Iran =

Topics referred to by the same term

The 2019 protests in Iran (Persian: اعتراضات ۱۳۹۸ ایران) are several protests in Iran in 2019, which can refer to the following:

- 2018–2019 Iranian general strikes and protests: Labor protests in 2018 and 2019 against poor economic conditions
- 2019–2020 Iranian protests: Protests that began in November 2019 in response to rising fuel prices
- 2019 Sistan and Baluchestan protests: Protests in Sistan and Baluchestan province in response to the arrest of a local cleric
