= 2025 internet blackout in Iran =

- Native name: قطعی سراسری اینترنت
- Location: Iran
- Date: 17–18 June 2025
- Target: Iranian internet users
- Attack type: Internet blackout
- Perpetrators: SNSC, MICT
- Motive: Twelve-Day War

In the first week of the Twelve-Day War, Iran shut down the internet nationwide. The Iranian government blocked access to the internet, leading to a 97% fall in internet usage in Iran. This has led to Iranians being disconnected from the outside world. According to cybersecurity expert Amir Rashidi, the internet is viewed as "an enemy" by the Iranian government which seeks to "control and suppress it".

Iran has historically blocked the internet to suppress protests, having done so In 2019 as well as 2022. From 2022 to 2024, Iran also banned WhatsApp and Google Play during the Mahsa Amini protests. The censorship of internet has been used by Iran to suppress dissent, protests and the Iranian opposition. Iranian blockage of the internet has historically brought about "huge" economic costs.

The Iranian government has urged Iranian citizens to block WhatsApp, claiming that it was Israeli spyware, a claim that WhatsApp denied. Additionally, social media access was blocked.

== History and reasoning ==
In 2019, Iran imposed an internet blackout. (Note: But not for the first time. See Internet censorship in Iran) From 2022 to 2024, the Iranian government banned WhatsApp and Google Play during the Mahsa Amini protests.

In 2019, Iran implemented a week-long internet shutdown during the "Bloody November" protests, which saw the loss of about 1,500 lives. This disruption was part of a larger strategy to restrict the spread of protest-related information and prevent the coordination of demonstrations. The Iranian government justified the shutdown as a means to control the spread of information and prevent unrest, while international observers criticized it as a tool of repression. This was done to ensure the control and dissemination of the government's narrative. However some Iranians managed to bypass controls and reported on what was occurring to the outside world.

Additionally, Iran has established the National Information Network (NIN), a national intranet system designed to give the government greater control over internet access and monitoring. This infrastructure allows the government to enact "digital curfews," restricting internet access in particular areas or during times of increased unrest, effectively hindering communication and the organization of protests.

AP News said that Iran relied on electronic surveillance and internet censorship to enforce its mandatory-hijab laws and suppress protests. The government deployed drones, facial recognition software, and a mobile app called "Nazer" to monitor women in public, while encouraging citizens to report violations. These measures were part of a broader strategy to control dissent and limit access to information, particularly after protests erupted following the death of Mahsa Amini in 2022. The government also restricted social media platforms and imposed internet blackouts to disrupt the organization of protests. Through these tactics, AP News reported that Iran sought to strengthen its control over the population and suppress opposition.

The BBC reported that due to Iranian government control of media, the internet provided one of the few platforms where Iranians could freely express themselves. In the BBC report it was also said that internet blocking was "effective tool that severely harms the ability of protesters to organise, communicate and inform the outside world". The report also said that "it also carries a huge cost for the Iranian economy, businesses and public services."

== 2025 event ==
In the first week of the Iran–Israel war, Iranians were disconnected from the internet. Internet access was first reduced before being almost completely blocked. NBC reported that this disconnected Iranians from the outside world and has been used as a tool in times of civil unrest. During the early days of the Iran–Israel war, millions of Iranians reportedly followed Israeli organizations and personalities, bypassing the government's internet censorship. Internet monitoring organizations, NetBlocks and Cloudflare Radar, reported a sharp decline in internet connectivity in Iran on 17 June. Internet bandwidth reportedly dropped by 80%, according to The New York Times. IODA also presented evidence showing that internet usage in Iran had collapsed to 97% below normal levels. Iran stated that the blackout was in response to Israeli cyberattacks. TechCrunch reported that the internet blackout worsened on 18 June compared to the previous day. The practise of blacking out the internet in Iran, according to MSN, has been done due to civil unrest.

DW said that in Iran the "internet serves as lifeline despite censorship". Cybersecurity expert Amir Rashidi said that the internet is viewed as the enemy by Iran which seeks to control and suppress it. DW reported that the Iranian regime is spreading misinformation "to psychologically manipulate society, so that members of the regime don't turn their backs on it".

Amid the blackout, Iran's banking system reportedly collapsed, according to Iran International. However, the Iranian central bank stated that the banking system was "functioning normally".

Iran urged its citizens to delete WhatsApp, claiming that information was being shared with Israel. However, according to Time, no evidence was presented by Iran to substantiate these claims.

WhatsApp denied Iran's claims, stating, "We are concerned these false reports will be an excuse for our services to be blocked at a time when people need them the most." The company added, "We do not provide bulk information to any government."

Other social media apps, such as Telegram, X, and Instagram, are banned in Iran. According to Time, millions of Iranians were using these banned apps through VPNs.

Internet users, according to NBC News, have called on Elon Musk to intervene and provide internet access to Iranians via Starlink.

== See also ==
- 2019 internet blackout in Iran
- 2026 internet blackout in Iran
- Political repression in the Islamic Republic of Iran
- Iran's National Information Network
