= 2026 internet blackout in Iran =

- Part of 2025–2026 Iranian protests, 2026 Iran massacres and the 2026 Iran war
- Date: 8 January 2026 – 26 May 2026 (4 months and 18 days)
- Location: Iran
- Type: Internet blackout
- Motive: Suppression of 2025–2026 Iranian protests; Covering up of the 2026 Iran massacres; Reasons related to the 2026 Iran war
- Target: Iranian internet users
- Perpetrators: IRGC, SNSC, MICT

On 8 January 2026, the twelfth day of the 2025–2026 protests in Iran, Iranian authorities imposed an internet blackout. Reports from Iran described widespread telephone and internet blackouts in Tehran, with additional disruptions reported in Isfahan, Lordegan, Abdanan, parts of Shiraz, and Kermanshah. Cybersecurity experts reported that Iran's National Information Network was also fully disconnected, even internally within Iran.

Although the blackout had been relaxed on 28 January, severe restrictions are still in place. The Iranian Minister of Communications, Sattar Hashemi, acknowledged that the shutdown was costing the economy $35.7 million a day. In April, Afshin Kolahi estimated that the direct cost of the shutdown was between $30–40 million per day, and that adding indirect costs makes the true impact closer to $70–80 million per day. Online sales fell by 80% during the internet shutdown, while the Tehran Stock Exchange overall index lost 450,000 points over a four-day period, and 130 trillion tomans daily. In January 2026, the number of financial transactions in Iran had dropped by 185 million.

The internet blackout, which initially did not affect satellite internet connections like Starlink, has increased efforts to shut down the Starlink internet, alongside operations to seize satellite dishes to hinder access to the internet. The internet blackout has been described by human rights organisations as an attempt by the government to cover up the 2026 Iran massacres.

As of 16 February, internet traffic levels in Iran were reduced by 50%. In February 2026, internet prices increased by 18%, bringing the total increase to 52%.

Following the 28 February Israeli–United States strikes on Iran, there was a renewed "near total" internet blackout in Iran, as NetBlocks reported internet connectivity in Iran dropping to 4% of ordinary levels. Iranians abroad have also reported that they have been unable to connect with family members in Iran or access the Iranian intranet. As of 6 March, internet traffic was measured at about 1% of normal connectivity.

By 21 April 2026, the shutdown had entered is 53rd consecutive day (over 1,248 hours), making it the longest nationwide internet disruption recorded in any country. Authorities began restoring internet to "favoured groups", while most people remained disconnected. As of 16 April, it was estimated that the shutdown had cost the economy $1.8 billion. Internet connectivity remained at extremely limited levels, restricting access to independent information sources. On 12 April, an Iranian official said that there was no timeline for restoring the internet.

On 25 May, Pezeshkian gave an order to end the internet blackout, and it was partially restored, though service remained slow and with restrictions.

== Background ==
Iran has historically blocked the internet to suppress protests, having done so in 2019 as well as in 2022 and 2025. From 2022 to 2024, Iran also banned WhatsApp and Google Play during the Mahsa Amini protests. Iran's use of internet censorship to suppress dissents allows the government to impede political opposition, but damages the nation's economy.

Internet shutdowns and filtering have long been central for the Islamic Republic's control over information flows in Iran, and the government regularly shuts down or limits internet access in anticipation of protests. During the protests of November 2019, the Iranian government imposed a full six-day internet blackout, shielding it's from criticism over its mass killing of protesters. Protests in 2020 over the government's shootdown of Ukraine International Airlines Flight 752, as well as protests over the increase of fuel prices, were followed by complete internet blackouts imposed by the government.

During the Twelve-Day War between Iran and Israel in June 2025, the Iranian government cut off internet and telecommunications, claiming reasons of national security; the shutdown also halted the flow of information from the country to the outside world. The Iranian government blocked access to the internet, leading to a 97% fall in internet usage in Iran. This led to Iranians being disconnected from the outside world. According to cybersecurity expert Amir Rashidi, the internet is viewed as "an enemy" by the Iranian government and seeks to "control and suppress it". During the war, the Iranian government had opened a fake Starlink app as bait to spy on citizens. It has also spread certain disinformation to prevent defection within its ranks. The government had urged Iranian citizens to block WhatsApp, claiming that it was Israeli spyware, a claim that WhatsApp denied.

According to one report, the Iranian government has received extensive assistance from the Chinese government in filtering internet access over the last decade and a half.

== 2026 protests and internet shutdown ==
=== Partial restrictions before 8 January ===
Large-scale street protests in Iran emerged in December 2025 and continued into January 2026. The protests had been called for by varied opposition groups, including Reza Pahlavi, the exiled son of the deposed Shah; Kurdish organizations, and the Coordination Council of Azerbaijani Parties; and the traditional shopkeepers of the bazaars of Tehran, Tabriz, Isfahan, Mashhad, and Kerman closed in support of the demonstrations. BBC Persian reported that initially, the government had restricted internet information (by slowing speeds and imposing targeted disruptions, aimed at disrupting mobile networks in locations where protests had taken place, such as the Tehran's Grand Bazaar), but left other areas, as well as fixed-line internet, comparably unaffected. The project Filterwatch reported that, "From the onset of the protests through 8 January 2026, the pattern of internet disruptions can be characterized as localized, urban-centric, volatile, and layered."

Internet traffic data collected by global monitoring services, such as Cloudflare, indicate that usage levels in Iran were decreased in traffic since protests began, though it has remained above zero. Research by the organization Filterwatch indicated that connections in Iran (including VPN connections) suffered disruptions in the evening, timed to coincide with planned protest hours, with major traffic drops seen during those hours over Telecommunication Company of Iran (TCI), MCI, and Irancell networks.

Means of restrictions include disabling mobile network antennas, cutting phone lines, limiting the transmission of high-volume data, and deactivating SIM cards belonging to dissident citizens and social activists. Authorities attempted to deflect accusations of censorship by blaming disruptions on power outages and outdated equipment.

=== Nationwide shutdowns starting 8 January ===
On 8 January 2026, during twelfth day of protests, authorities cut off internet service and phones in the country, as protests intensified. Internet service was cut off nationwide as demonstrators chanted in support of Reza Pahlavi. Telephone service was also affected, including land and mobile lines. Initial reports of blackouts and restrictions came from multiple cities. By that afternoon, the nation was almost completely offline, as confirmed by monitoring organizations, such as NetBlocks and the Georgia Institute of Technology's internet Outage Detection and Analysis database. That evening, Netblocks wrote that Iran was "now in the midst of a nationwide internet blackout; the incident follows a series of escalating digital censorship measures targeting protests across the country and hinders the public's right to communicate at a critical moment."

=== Use of internet blackout to cover up massacres ===
The nationwide communications blackout has been widely described by human rights organisations, such as Amnesty International and Human Rights Watch, as an attempt to cover up the Iran massacres and the human rights violations committed during the crackdown on protests. By severely restricting access to the internet, social media, and messaging platforms, the government limited the ability of journalists, activists, and families of victims to document and share evidence of killings and other abuses, thereby reducing international scrutiny and obscuring the scale of state violence.

=== Circumvention ===
Starlink satellite internet was initially unaffected, allowing some users to bypass government-controlled internet blackouts. Although some homes, hotels, and offices have Starlink, this only accounts for a small percentage of Iranians. Iran has banned Starlink and has sought to police the ground terminals needed for Starlink connections. The nationwide internet blackout intensified calls for Elon Musk to help expand access using the Starlink network. Iranian activist Masih Alinejad urged him to do so. The subscription fees for Starlink users were reportedly waived starting on 14 January.

Since 8 January, the Iranian government launched a large-scale effort to jam GPS signals to disrupt access to Starlink, resulting in an estimated 30% packet loss for connections to Starlink. According to Amir Rashidi of the Miaan Group, some areas had a packet loss of 80%.

By 11 January, Iran reportedly shut down the Starlink internet for the first time.

On 19 January 2026, it was reported that hackers managed to break in to Iran's state TV satellite feed, and broadcast supporting messages of the exiled crown prince Reza Pahlavi. He urged security forces not to point their weapons at the Iranian people.

As of February 2026, there were about 400,000 Iranians abroad that had used Psiphon to allow people inside Iran to access the internet, while the Trump administration had also covertly smuggled thousands of Starlink terminals into Iran for Iranians to access the internet.

=== Government retaliation ===
After the Iranian government shut down the Starlink internet, its security forces started door-to-door operations, seizing satellite dishes amid the blackout to block any external access. On 14 January, reports emerged that the government was finalizing their internet kill switch project, which is intended to cut the nation completely off from the global internet for extended periods; this plan is being coordinated with Huawei and China. By 16 January, after more than 200 hours of the blackout, NetBlocks reported a very slight internet connectivity increase at 2%. Reports also indicated that the government was planning on permanently cutting internet access, with only vetted individuals being permitted filtered and censored access.

On 17 January, it was reported that CCTV footage was being confiscated, and checkpoints were set up to detain citizens found with protest images on their phones. On 18 January, Meta began hiding the Instagram followers of Iranian residents after reports indicated that Iranian security bodies were extracting large volumes of user data. After targeting Iranians abroad with cybersecurity threats and phishing scams, it was reported on 19 January that the Iran-linked "Handala Hack" group was routing attacks via Starlink.

On 20 January, it was reported by an investigative watchdog that pro-government editors were active during the crackdown across Wikipedia and other services in deleting content and sanitizing articles related to the Islamic Republic's human rights record. On 20 January, it was also reported that Iranian authorities claimed they had cut off 40,000 Starlink satellite internet connections during the internet blackout. On 21 January, it was reported that the Islamic Republic was working on a state-run intranet amid the ongoing blackout, similar to that of North Korea. On 23 January, NetBlocks reported the blackout was entering its third week while the Iranian government was attempting to generate false traffic in order to manufacture the narrative of a wider restoration and normalcy.

During the blackout, Iranian diaspora internet users ran applications to share part of their bandwidth in an attempt to help users inside Iran circumvent the blackout. Separately, an independent research group stated the Islamic Republic had coordinated a large social media influence operation aimed at shaping global narratives. The Guardian also reported the Islamic Republic used Chinese technology during the internet blackout and suppression of protests, such as facial recognition and surveillance tools.

=== Temporary relaxation of the blackout ===
According to Iran International, internet connections from Iran were briefly reported on 24 January 2026, but it was only on 28 January when the blackout was relaxed. However severe restrictions remain in place, with most users only being allowed to access pre-approved websites under a whitelist system.

== War and renewed blackout ==
On 28 February, when the Israeli–United States strikes on Iran started, NetBlocks reported that internet connectivity in Iran dropping to 4% of ordinary levels. Iranians abroad reported that they had been unable to connect with family members in Iran. As of 29 March, the 30th day of the renewed blackout, the ongoing blackout persisted, with connectivity at just 1% of ordinary levels throughout the month of March. On 25 March, it was reported that since Iranians didn't have a missile alert system, a crowdsourced app and website named Mahsa Alert provided Iranian citizens with crucial information during the internet blackout. On 3 April, it was reported that some Iranians were traveling across the Turkish border for internet access amid the ongoing internet blackout. By 21 April 2026, the shutdown had entered is 53rd consecutive day (over 1,248 hours), making it the longest nationwide internet disruption recorded in any country. Authorities began restoring internet to "favored groups", while most people remained disconnected. As of 16 April, it was estimated that the shutdown had cost the economy $1.8 billion.

On 7 April, Iranian police arrested somebody accused of selling VPN services to access the internet.

Immediately following a military strike on Mount Derak in Shiraz, satellite interference stopped, suggesting that there had been a jamming tower in the area.

The internet blackout continued after the 8 April ceasefire, passing the 1,000-hour mark by 11 April. The internet blackout is estimated to cause losses of at least $35 million per day, with the blackout having intensified after the renewed shutdown at the end of February.

On 15 April, the Iranian science minister said that the communications ministry was facing "considerations beyond its authority," and that the two ministries were coordinating about the possibility of restoring the internet.

=== Tiered internet access ===
In late April, officials associated with president Masoud Pezeshkian and several Iranian citizens' associations and individuals protested against IRGC-aligned authorities' tiered internet access (Persian: Internet Tabaghati) proposals.

=== Partial end of the blackout ===
On 25 May, Pezeshkian gave an order to end the internet blackout. On 26 May, Iran partially restored internet, but service remained slow and with restrictions. By the end of May, authorities had restored some internet service, although access was still limited for most users. The government said it had begun returning access to pre-war levels, which were already heavily restricted after a 20-day shutdown during nationwide protests in January.

== Potential plans for permanent shutdown ==
On 15 January 2026, Filterwatch, an internet monitoring organization, published a report detailing the confidential long-term plan of the Iranian government for "Absolute Digital Isolation," stating that "state media and government spokespersons have already signaled that this is a permanent shift, warning that unrestricted access will not return after 2026."

According to the report, the plan dictates the transformation of Iran's internet infrastructure into a "Barracks Internet", allowing access to the outside world only to individuals and organizations with security clearance, through a strictly monitored "whitelist". Communications will be limited to intra-team (Enterprise Messenger) and peer-to-peer interactions, while any attempt to breach the organizational network would be blocked. This model will ensure that all channels of private sector communications will be fully monitorable by the government, while replacing the former goal of blocking inappropriate content with that which completely disconnects all users from the internet, granting access only to specific groups with "security guarantees".

Although the existence of an isolated Iranian internet infrastructure was proven in 2012, the implementation of the plan for permanent shutdown began with the identification and blocking of Starlink terminals as well as confiscation of TV and satellite dishes to prevent frequency overlaps and alternative usage. During the 2025–2026 protests, foreign telecom service providers started leaving Iran under heavy security measures and media silence, possibly to be replaced by Iranian institutions such as Khatam al-Anbiya.

The plan was reportedly orchestrated by high-level officials Mohammad Amin Aghamiri and Mehdi SeifAbadi, with the assistance of former head of the Information Technology Organization, and prominent security figure, Ali Hakim-Javadi.

In response to the plan for permanent shutdown, an American official stated that it was "plausible and terrifying", but would also have an extremely massive cultural and economic impact on Iran.

On 15 January, government spokesperson Fatemeh Mohajerani stated that access to international websites would remain unavailable until at least the Iranian New Year, which occurs on 20 March. Limited internet access was briefly restored on 18 January, before being suspended again. Ebrahim Azizi said internet service would resume "as soon as security conditions are appropriate".

On 19 February, the intelligence chief of the IRGC confirmed plans to permanently block foreign social media platforms.

== Domestic effects ==
The internet shutdown not only blocked instant messengers and social media sites, but also crucial work related sites, including Slack, Skype, Google Meet and Jira. Web browsing software also stopped working, while VPN disruption hampered the operation of company emails, payment systems and authentication processes. At the same time, online advertising was halted, damaging businesses. Online businesses were unable to conduct business. A website called روایت خاموشی ("Narrative of the Blackout") was launched so that people who only had access to the national network could share information describing the problems caused by the lack of internet access. The site gained a large amount of publicity after news sources began covering it.

The Iranian Minister of Communications stated that the shutdown was costing the economy $35.7 million a day, while NetBlocks estimated the daily cost as much as $37 million. In April, Afshin Kolahi estimated that the direct cost of the shutdown was between $30–40 million per day, and that adding indirect costs makes the true impact closer to $70–80 million per day. The shutdown has caused many small businesses and startups to go bankrupt.

Human rights organisations described the internet blackout as an attempt to cover up the massacres. The internet blackout has been condemned by many internet architects and leaders, including, Anousheh Ansari, Geoff Huston, and Signal president, Meredith Whittaker.

Since 2026, under Iranian legislation, users and owners of Starlink terminals can face prison times up to 10 years or even execution.

In the United Nations, Russian and Iranian governments accused Starlink of violating 1967 Outer Space Treaty. Iran-Russia's Geran 2 HESA Shahed 136 are outfitted with Starlink terminals.

The Iranian government implemented an internet censorship infrastructure similar to that of the Chinese Great Firewall. Iranians used Tor Snowflake, Psiphon and other tools for circumvention. VPN app downloads in Iran rose 500% in the first few days after the restrictions started. The MICT banned the publication of the identities of profiteers of internet censorship circumvention tools. Many Iranian game studios shut down and fired their workers as a result.

On 12 February, the Ministry of Information & Communication Technology stated, "We all agree society needs internet." and that internet connection has not yet been restored as well as stating the internet shutdown reduced incoming cyberattacks. On February 12, the BBC reported Iran had resorted to cutting SIM cards and further restricting internet access to dissidents. The Trump administration reportedly smuggled six thousand Starlink terminals in an effort to restore internet access.

On 7 April, access to the global internet in Iran remained at roughly 1% of pre‑war levels. Most residents could only use a slow, restricted intranet that provided basic services and access mostly to state-run news and messaging platforms. A small number of users could connect to the internet via state whitelists or paid temporary proxy connections, but those went offline sometimes after just a short time. On 12 April, an Iranian official said that there was no timeline for restoring the internet.

== International effects ==
After the 2026 internet blackout started, many accounts on X that were supportive of an independent Scotland went silent. Disinformation researchers suggested that these accounts belonged to Iranians who were pretending to be from Scotland. The same situation occurred in 2025, when Iran had an internet blackout and many of the same accounts went silent. Both of these internet blackouts allowed cybersecurity analysts and officials in the United Kingdom to connect these fake Scotland accounts to Iran.

== See also ==
- Censorship during the 2026 Iran war
- 2019 internet blackout in Iran
- 2025 internet blackout in Iran
- Iran's National Information Network
