= 2019 internet blackout in Iran =

Iranian internet shutdown
- Native name: قطعی سراسری اینترنت
- Location: Iran
- Date: 16 – 23 November 2019 (8 days)
- Target: Iranian internet users
- Attack type: Internet blackout
- Perpetrators: SNSC, MICT
- Motive: Suppression of the 2019–2020 Iranian protests

The 2019 internet blackout in Iran was a week-long total shutdown of the internet in Iran. It was ordered by the Supreme National Security Council and imposed by the Ministry of ICT. The blackout was one of the Iranian government's efforts to suppress the 2019–2020 Iranian protests.

During the blackout, Iranian citizens could only access the National Information Network. Mohammad-Javad Jahromi was sanctioned by the United States Department of the Treasury (USDT) because of his role in internet censorship in Iran.

The blackout led to an estimated $1 billion to $1.5 billion in damages to the Iranian economy.

== Extent ==
The 2019 blackout was the most wide-scale internet shutdown ever in Iran. It was "the most severe disconnection tracked by NetBlocks in any country in terms of its technical complexity and breadth." Although it was a near-total shutdown, top Iranian politicians still had access to the internet. The 2019 blackout was the first-ever and longest total internet shutdown in a large country. It was also the first blackout that effectively isolated a whole nation.

Doug Madory, the director of internet analysis at Oracle, has described the operation as "unusual in its scale" and way more advanced.

Iranians usually use VPNs to access social media, but none of them worked during the shutdown. As a result of that, some people used Toosheh to get news and other internet-related content.

A new study by human rights organization Article 19 has revealed how Iranian authorities were able to cut off the internet of tens of millions of Iranian people in November 2019 and use another "local" type of internet instead. This study outlines the structure of Iran's internet and provides a picture of control that is unparalleled anywhere in the world. This consolidation of technologies means that Iran is in a unique position to exercise control over its citizens' internet.

The disruption was part of a larger strategy to restrict the spread of protest-related information and prevent the coordination of demonstrations.

== Implementation ==
It took 24 hours for MICT to cut off people's access to the internet. The ministry had to order a range of ISPs and mobile data providers to stop providing users with international network and connect to NIN. Some providers withdrew their routes from the internet and some continued to announce routes but block traffic.

Although the global network was not accessible, local services including banks, state-run messaging apps, and vehicle for hire mobile apps continued to operate through National Information Network. State-owned web search engines and GPS navigation software were also enabled.

== Timeline and statistics ==
Users first reported minor outages in Mashhad on 15 November. The disruptions increased in extent and severity with impact also visible on overall connectivity charts. Iran's largest mobile network operators, including MCI, Rightel and Irancell, fell offline on the evening of 16 November. The internet blocking gradually increased until the country reached the point of total shutdown. There was a partial return of the internet in eight provinces (Ardebil, Golestan, Markazi, Mazandaran, Qazvin, Qom, Semnan and West Azarbaijan) on around 7 PM on 17 November but by 20 November, national connectivity was at 5% of ordinary levels. According to the Monash IP Observatory, the only area that was not affected by the nationwide shut-down was the city of Bam in the Kerman province.

On 23 November, NetBlocks reported that "Internet access is being restored in Iran and connectivity levels have risen to 64%".

== Impact ==
The Iranian regime killed around 1500 people protesting the rises in gas prices, making the month of November 2019 to be known as Bloody November or Bloody Aban (9th month of the Solar Hijri calendar, falling, in most part, on November in the Gregorian calendar). Iranians couldn't contact their friends and families abroad through the internet. Hundreds of currency exchanges and travel agencies closed down. Movie ticket sales dropped 60%. Estimates of total damage to the Iranian economy ranged from $1 billion to $1.5 billion. The Washington Post reported that the blackout has had a severe impact on start-ups and small businesses.

== Responses ==
After the blackout, an Android VPN application, named MahsaNG was created by gfw-knocker, a popular name in Chinese Censorship circumenvention groups.

== See also ==
- Mahsa Amini protests § Communications blackouts
- 2025 internet blackout in Iran
- Political repression in the Islamic Republic of Iran
- Iran's National Information Network
- 2026 internet blackout in Iran
- 2019–2020 Iranian protests
