= Supreme Council of Cyberspace (Iran) =

Cyberspace council

- شورای عالی فضای مجازی
- Founded: 7 March 2012; 14 years ago
- Location: Tehran, Iran
- Region served: Cyberspace
- Key people: Masoud Pezeshkian, Chairman Mohammad-Amin Aghamiri, Secretary
- Website: www.majazi.ir

The Supreme Council of Cyberspace (Persian: شورای عالی فضای مجازی, romanized: shoraye ali fazaye mojazi) is a cyberspace-council which was formed on 26 February 2012 by the decree of Iran's supreme leader, Ali Khamenei; and is obliged to establish "National Cyberspace Center of the country" to have an entire and up-to-date knowledge of internal/external cyberspace and in order to decide regarding "how to deal with the harms of the Internet".

The members of this council are appointed for a period of 3 years; and the president of the country is considered as the head of it. The High-Council of Informatics, the High-Council of Information and the High-Council of IT are considered as the bodies which were acted as policymakers and implementers in the mentioned field before this council's formation.

== Natural-members ==
The "Supreme Council of Cyberspace" consists of the following "Natural-members":

- Saied Reza Ameli
- Hamid Shahriari
- Reza Taghipour
- Ezzatollah Zarghami
- Mohammad Sarafraz
- Mohammad Hassan Entezari
- Mahdi Akhavan Bahabadi
- Masoud Abu-Talebi
- Kamyar Saqafi
- Rasool Jalili

== Legal-members ==
Legal-members of the "Supreme Council of Cyberspace" are as follows:

- Secretary of the Council and President of the National Cyberspace Center: Mohammad-Amin Aghamiri
- President of Iran: Masoud Pezeshkian
- List of speakers of the Parliament of Iran: Mohammad Bagher Ghalibaf
- Head of Judicial system of Iran: Gholam-Hossein Mohseni-Eje'i
- Head of Islamic Republic of Iran Broadcasting: Peyman Jebelli
- Minister of Ministry of Information and Communications Technology of Iran: Sattar Hashemi
- Minister of Ministry of Culture and Islamic Guidance: Abbas Salehi
- Minister of Ministry of Science, Research and Technology (Iran): Hossein Simaee Sarraf
- Minister of Ministry of Education (Iran): Alireza Kazemi
- Minister of Ministry of Intelligence (Iran): Undeclared (acting)
- Minister of Ministry of Defence and Armed Forces Logistics (Iran): Majid Ebn-e-Reza (acting)
- Vice President for Science and Technology: Hossein Afshin
- Chairman of the Cultural Commission of the Islamic Consultative Assembly :Morteza Aghatehrani
- Head of Islamic Development Organization: Mohammad Qomi
- Commander of Islamic Revolutionary Guard Corps: Ahmad Vahidi
- Commander of Law Enforcement Force of the Islamic Republic of Iran: Ahmad-Reza Radan
- Prosecutor-General of Iran: Mohammad Movahedi-Azad
- Head of Iran's National Organization for Passive Defense: Gholamreza Jalali

== See also ==
- Supreme Leader Representation in Universities
- Hamid Shahriari
