= Iran–Switzerland relations =

- Iran: Switzerland

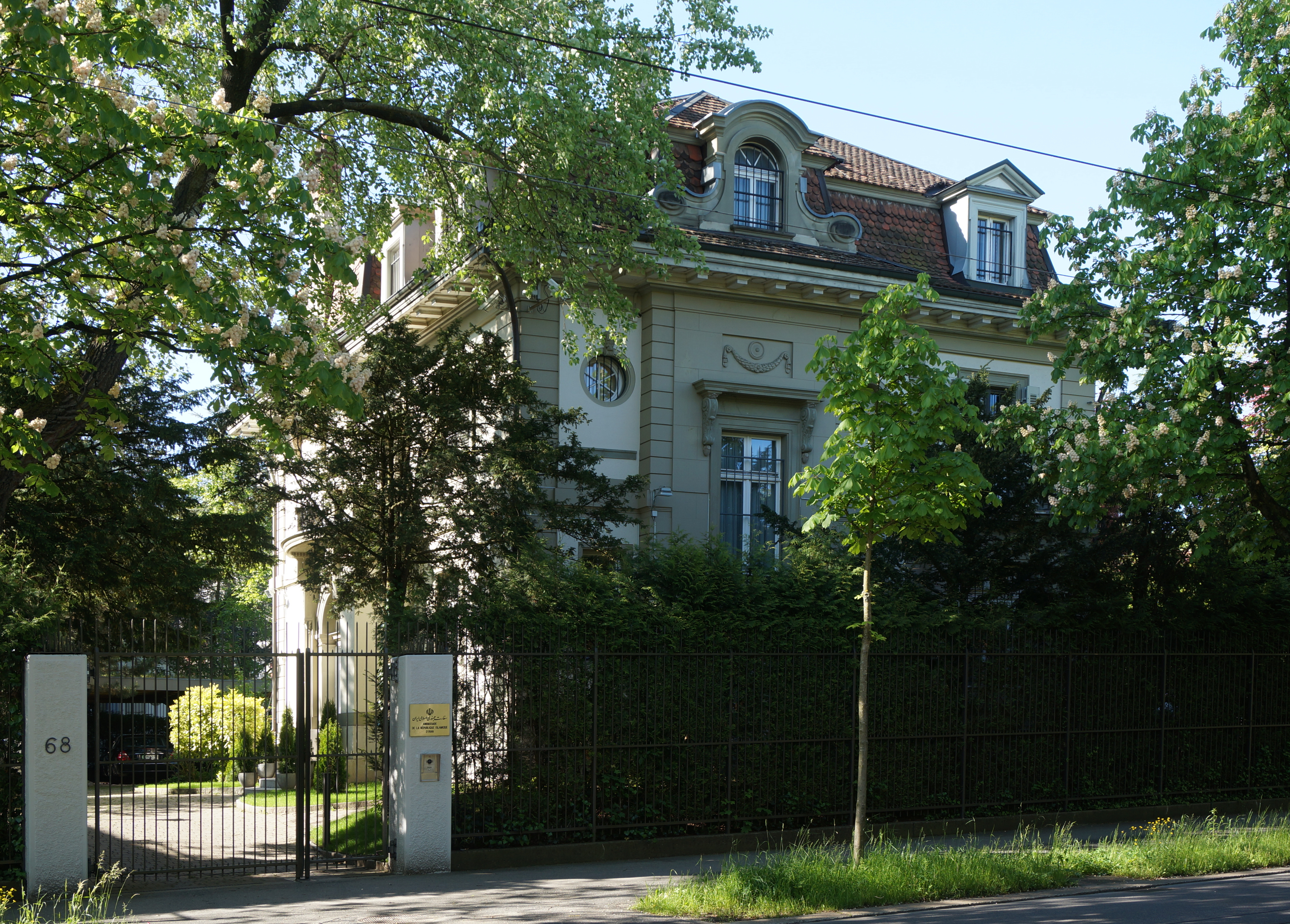
Iranian embassy at Bern, Switzerland

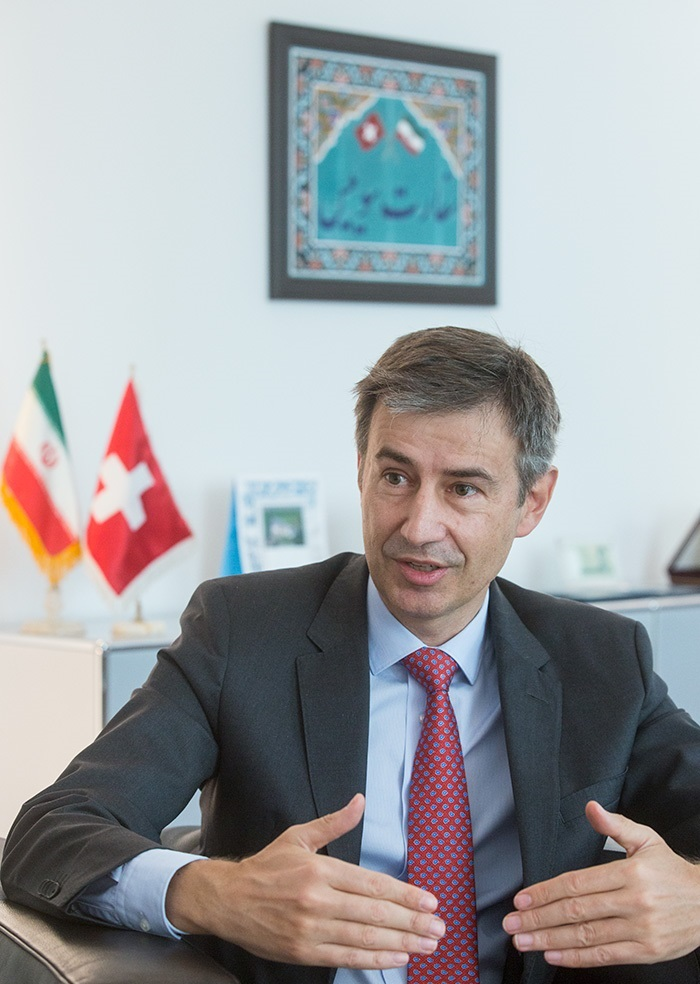
Markus Leitner, Swiss ambassador to Iran from August 27, 2017, Interviewed by FNA on April 30, 2018.

Iran–Switzerland relations are foreign relations between the Islamic Republic of Iran and the Swiss Confederation.

Switzerland has had a consulate in Tehran since 1919 which was raised to the status of embassy in 1936 and also represents the interests of the United States in Tehran. Switzerland has also represented Iran in Canada, Israel, and Saudi Arabia. Today, Iran has an embassy in Bern, while Switzerland has an embassy in Tehran.

== History ==
=== 1979 Revolution ===
Switzerland became the "protecting power" of the United States in Iran after the Iranian Revolution of 1979.

Since May 1980, the Swiss embassy in Tehran has been consistently relaying diplomatic communications between Iran and the United States.

=== Iran–Iraq War ===
Beginning in 1984, victims of the Iran–Iraq War received medical treatment in neutral Switzerland, while Swiss companies were doing multibillion-dollar business with Iraq at the same time. Cooperation on the national level to prevent natural catastrophes was initiated in 2006.

=== Murder of Kazem Rajavi ===
Ali Fallahian, an Iranian politician and cleric who served as a member of the 3rd Assembly of Experts of the IRI and as the Minister of Intelligence of Islamic Republic of Iran in cabinet of President Hashemi Rafsanjani was charged by a Swiss court with masterminding the assassination of Kazem Rajavi, a brother of Mujahedin-e Khalq leader Massoud Rajavi, near Geneva in broad daylight by several agents on April 24, 1990.

=== Crypto AG and espionage case ===
In 1992, Hans Buehler an employee of Swiss firm Crypto AG was detained in Iran on charges of espionage. He was later released by the Iranian authorities after the firm paid a 1 million dollar bond. Soon after Buehler's release Crypto AG dismissed him and charged him the $1m. Swiss media and the German magazine Der Spiegel took up his case in 1994, pursuing the question of whether Crypto's machines had in fact been rigged by Western intelligence (namely the NSA). In 2020, a Swiss parliamentary investigation revealed that in fact "Swiss intelligence service were aware of and benefited from the Zug-based firm Crypto AG’s involvement in the US-led spying".

=== Friedrich Tinner, the Iranian nuclear program and the CIA ===
Friedrich Tinner is a Swiss engineer, connected with the Khan network trafficking in the proliferation of nuclear materials and know-how to Pakistan, Iran, Libya, and North Korea. He has been connected in particular with gas centrifuges used for isotopic enrichment of uranium. In May 2008, the President of the Swiss Confederation, Pascal Couchepin announced that the Tinner files, believed to number around 30,000 documents, had been shredded. It is alleged that this was a cover-up, to hide the involvement of Urs Tinner with the CIA.

=== Swiss diplomat arrested on sexual charges ===
In February 2009, the Iranian police arrested Marco Kämpf, the Swiss diplomat acting as the First Secretary of the US Interests, on sex charges after finding him with an Iranian woman in a car. The diplomat was recalled to Switzerland.

=== Human rights dialogue and the 2009 Swiss vote on minarets ===
The two countries have been engaged in a human rights dialogue since 2003 and in discussions on migration since 2005. Following a constitutional amendment banning the construction of new minarets in Switzerland in 2009, Iran described the Swiss vote as "Islamophobic" and a blow to religious freedom.

=== Security incidences at the Iranian embassy in Bern ===
In November 2011, Swiss police investigated two minor attacks on the Iranian Embassy in Bern.

On October 1, 2022, Swiss police had to use rubber bullets to disperse a crowd of a thousand protesters in front of the Iranian embassy in Bern. The demonstrators protested against the death of Mahsa Amini, who was held in Iranian police custody the month before.

=== Tax evasion ===
In 2014, international medias reported Iranian nationals to be listed among the tax evaders in Switzerland.

=== Death of Swiss diplomat ===
In 2021, Iranian authorities found the dead body of a Swiss diplomat at the base of a tower in Tehran. The cause of the fall was “unknown”.

=== Diplomatic representation on behalf of the United States ===
The Swiss diplomatic corps in Tehran has represented U.S. interests soon after the Islamic revolution in 1979. A number of crucial agreements such as the JCPOA in 2015 but particularly direct affairs such as the exchange of U.S. and Iranian detainees in 2023 were negotiated through the Swiss protecting power mandate. Secretary of State Antony Blinken thanked Switzerland for its valuable service during the prisoner swap in 2023.

The Iranian Foreign Ministry summoned Swiss charge d'affaires in September 2023. Earlier, U.S. Secretary of State Antony Blinken met with the Gulf Cooperation Council (GCC) Secretary General Jasem Mohamed AlBudaiwi and GCC member states' foreign ministers in New York and issued a joint statement that included a warning to Iran “to cease its proliferation of dangerous weapons that pose a grave security threat to the region". Despite an improved diplomatic climate between the U.S. and Iran and renewed diplomatic relations between Saudi Arabia and Iran, Tehran claims the plunder by the U.S “of the region's wealth and resources through pursuing its Iranophobia policy." The Swiss diplomat assured to convey Iran's protest to Washington as soon as possible.

In the aftermath of the Israeli airstrike on the Iranian consulate in Damascus in April 2024, the U.S. indirectly communicated with Iran through the Swiss intermediary about the imminent attack on Israel. Iran also utilised the Swiss protecting power mandate to communicate to the U.S. concerning Iranian demands. While the Swiss mandate played a vital role during the conflict, its foreign ministry refused to divulge any reaction Switzerland had taken in reaction to the attack.

In early October 2024 after Iran's second attack on Israel, foreign minister Abbas Araqchi communicated to the U.S. via the Swiss embassy saying "it was our right to self-defence and that we do not intend to continue (the attack)".

On June 20, 2025, it was reported that Switzerland will temporary shut down its embassy in Tehran due to the Twelve-Day War between Iran and Israel. The staff left the country and is safe, but Switzerland would continue to represent U.S. interests in Iran and urged the parties urgently to return to dialogue.

=== Bilateral relations ===
Marking 100 years of high-level diplomatic ties, Swiss president Ignazio Cassis made an official visit to Iran from 5 to 7 September 2020. Mr Cassis‘ encounter with Iranian President Hassan Rouhani, Foreign Minister Mohammad Javad Zarif and Secretary of the Supreme National Security Council Ali Shamkhani underscored the successful bilateral ties and continued presence of Swiss companies and institutions in Iran. Swiss Representatives of the national security and foreign affairs committees were also present at the talks. Swiss officials were introduced to the new speaker of the Iranian Parliament Mohammad Bagher Qalibaf, reflecting the excellent cooperation between the two nations. Discussions on the ongoing Swiss humanitarian channel were another important topic during the visit by the Swiss president.

=== Death of Swiss national held on spying charges in Iranian detention ===
In January 2025, Iranian state media reported that a Swiss national had died in captivity in Iran after being held on espionage charges. The Swiss national, unnamed as of 10 January 2025, was found dead in the Semnan prison, 100 miles or so east of Tehran.

=== Asylum application of Iranian officials ===
In January 2026, a senior official at Iran's permanent mission to the UN, Alireza Jeyrani Hokmabad, requested asylum from Switzerland, deciding not to return to Iran out of fear of the social upheaval there. Hokmabad is reportedly one of several Iranian diplomats who requested asylum from European countries due to the protests. On 3 February, 2026, it was reported that a second diplomat, Gholam-Reza Derikvand, Chargé d'affaires of the Iranian embassy in Vienna, also had requested asylum from Switzerland.

== Trade ==
=== Oil trade ===
Marc Rich, a US-Israeli-Belgian businessman with international ties, entered Iran through his Glencore company headquartered in Switzerland. Rich ignored US and international sanctions on Iran and became the major trader of Iranian oil for 15 years.

=== Arms trade with Israel and Swiss banks ===
The Observer estimated that Israel-based private arms dealers sold Iran US-made weapons during the Iran–Iraq War totaled US$500 million annually, to supply Iran's Shah-based arsenal at the time. Time magazine reported that throughout 1981 and 1982, "the Israelis reportedly set up Swiss bank accounts to handle the financial end of the deals”.

=== Trade agreements ===
There are agreements between the two countries on air traffic (1954, 1972 and 2004), road and rail transport (1977), export risk guarantees (1966), protection of investments (1998) and double taxation (2002). Iran is one of Switzerland's most important trading partners in the Middle East. Swiss-Iranian economic treaties already exist for investment protection, double taxation and aviation. A trade agreement was signed in 2005 but has not yet been ratified. In 2010, the volume of trade with Iran was about 741 million Swiss francs; Switzerland exported goods for about 700 million francs, and it has imported goods to 41 million Swiss francs. The main goods exported by Switzerland are pharmaceutical products, machinery and agricultural products. Switzerland exports to Iran totaled nearly US$1.9 billion in the ten-month period ending on January 31, 2014. In 2017, Iran continued to import a significant amount of Swiss goods and services worth US$2.18 billion (4.3% of total imports) while Iranian exports to Switzerland only accounted for US$12 million during the same time period. According to national statistics, both exports from the EU and Switzerland to Iran dropped sharply after 2017, including those for pharmaceutical products. In early 2020, Geneva-based bank BCP and a large Swiss drugmaker were participating in the initial pilot shipment of essential medicines worth 2.3 million euros ($2.55 million). In July 2020, the State Secretariat for Economic Affairs (SECO) announced that the first transaction under the humanitarian trade agreement had been completed. In October 2020, the Trump administration further expanded U.S. sanctions to all Iranian financial institutions, thereby complicating additional exports under the agreement. In 2021, the Iran-Switzerland Chamber of Commerce noted an uptick in the trade between the two countries despite challenging banking operations. IRNA reported an increase of imports from Switzerland to 672,000 tons ($539 million) during the first four months of 2021, mostly in form of medical products and organic cereal. In 2021, Switzerland has become the fifth largest exporter to Iran, after the UAE, China, Turkey and the European Union.

=== 2007 gas contract ===
In the year 2007, Iran and Switzerland signed a major 25-year gas contract to export over 5 billion cubic meters of gas per year from the Persian Gulf reportedly valued at 18 billion euros. Starting with 1.5 billion cubic meters per year in 2010, to be increased to 4 bcm by 2012. This contract has been signed between the Switzerland's company of Elektrizitätsgesellschaft Laufenburg (EGL) and the National Iranian Gas Export Company which will be started practically at the beginning of 2009. There is some skepticism that Iran will not be able to supply gas to Switzerland for the foreseeable future because no pipeline connects Iran to Europe at present. In February 2010, Iran announced it is ready for gas export to Switzerland. The deal was aimed at reducing Bern's dependency on Russian gas. In October 2010, EGL announced the unilateral suspension of the gas contract with Iran.

=== International sanctions ===
Switzerland and Iran have greatly reduced their bilateral economic cooperation since the UN Security Council took up Iran's nuclear enrichment program in 2005. The Swiss government has been cooperating with the U.S. to freeze banking accounts and other financial assets belonging to individuals involved in the Iranian nuclear program; Switzerland has also committed to block the sale of dual-use items. Vitol and Glencore, 2 Swiss-based firms, were also major re-sellers of gasoline to Iran until recently but have since stopped trading with the country. In January and December 2011, Switzerland expanded its unilateral sanctions against Iran. The Swiss Federal Council said in a statement in January 2014 that it had suspended part of its economic sanctions against Iran in accordance with the Geneva nuclear accords between Tehran and the six world powers but the trade barriers are still officially in place. Based on a statement by Swiss President Didier Burkhalter at the 9th World Economic Forum, it will be a step by step process and the official removal of all trade sanctions will depend on the final agreement about Iran's nuclear program. The adoption of the Joint Comprehensive Plan of Action (JCPOA) took place in the Swiss city of Geneva and the general framework of the current agreement was concluded on April 2, 2015 in Lausanne. In 2016, following the implementation of the JCPOA with P5+1, Switzerland lifted all unilateral sanctions against Iran pertaining to its nuclear program and Johann Schneider-Ammann became the first ever Swiss president to visit Iran.

After the Trump administration unilaterally canceled the Joint Comprehensive Plan of Action (JCPOA), economic sanctions were reimposed in 2018, and further tightened in late 2019 by designating the Central Bank of Iran (CBI) under U.S. counterterrorism authorities, as well as imposing restrictions on cargo shipping from and to Iran. Swiss food and pharmaceutical companies have continued to do business with Iran, but due to the strict financial sanctions, even payments for exempt goods were difficult to process by Iranian and Swiss banks.

In November 2022, Switzerland adopted additional EU sanctions against Shahed Aviation Industries, the manufacturer of the Shahed drones, used by Russia in its war against Ukraine, as well as three senior Iranian military officers. But Switzerland did not impose additional EU sanctions following the death of Mahsa Amini as the 'diplomatic approach' was given priority. Switzerland holds several protecting power mandates carried out on behalf of Iran.

=== 2026 U.S. Sanctions Escalation ===
In August 2026, the U.S. announced "Operation Economic Outcast” to expand the focus of U.S. sanctions to third country “enablers” including Switzerland. The Treasury Department Office of Foreign Assets Control (OFAC) has mentioned a number of countries that engage in trade with Iran. Particularly, Swiss commodity traders are targeted.

==== Humanitarian channel ====
In late January 2020, the Swiss Humanitarian Trade Arrangement (SHTA) with Iran was implemented, assuring export guarantees through Swiss financial institutions for shipments of food and medical products to the Islamic republic.

On 15 June 2021, Swiss Foreign Minister Ignazio Cassis and US president Joe Biden said during a press interview in Geneva, Switzerland, they would both support more payments through the rarely used Swiss-Iranian humanitarian channel.

=== Representing the United States and Canada ===
Since May 1980, the Swiss embassy in Tehran has been consistently relaying diplomatic communications between the U.S. and Iran, aiding in the release of American hostages, and most notably in 2016, when president Barack Obama thanked the Swiss government for their critical assistance in crafting the Joint Comprehensive Plan of Action (JCPOA).

After the retraction of the nuclear deal in 2018, backchannel diplomacy between the two nations was intensified. Swiss Ambassador to Iran Markus Leitner relayed messages from the United States government to Minister of Foreign Affairs Javad Zarif in the aftermath of the 2020 Baghdad International Airport airstrike.

In 2012, Canada severed diplomatic ties with Iran over its support of the Assad regime during the Syrian Civil War, non-compliance with United Nations resolutions regarding its nuclear program, continuing threats to Israel, and fears for the safety of Canadian diplomats following attacks on the British embassy in Iran in violation of the Vienna Convention. After its ties were served, Italy represented Canada's interests until 2019 when Switzerland signed a protecting power mandate with Canada. Since 2019, Switzerland continued to represent Canada ever since

== Application of Iranian family law in Switzerland ==
A unique aspect of Iran–Switzerland relations concerns the application of Iranian family law to Iranian nationals residing in Switzerland, stemming from a 1934 treaty between Switzerland and the former Persian Empire that has remained in effect despite significant political changes in both countries.

=== Historical background ===
The Convention of Establishment signed in 1934 between Switzerland and Persia (now Iran) established that Iranian personal status, family, and inheritance law would apply to Iranian nationals living in Switzerland. Reciprocally, Swiss nationals in Iran remain subject to Swiss federal law in matters of personal status and family relations. This arrangement continued even after Iran's 1979 Islamic Revolution, which introduced Sharia into Iranian law, partly because Switzerland subsequently obtained five international mandates, including representing United States interests in Iran and facilitating Iran's potential accession to the World Trade Organization.

=== Legal implications and controversies ===
The application of Iranian family law in Switzerland has created significant legal challenges, particularly for Iranian women seeking divorce or child custody. Under Iranian law, women cannot obtain divorce without their husband's consent except in exceptional circumstances such as mental incapacitation or impotence. Additionally, custody of children typically goes to the father, even in cases involving domestic violence.

The Swiss Federal Supreme Court confirmed in 2001 that the 1934 treaty should continue to be applied, but introduced an important limitation: Iranian law would not be recognized if it conflicts with Swiss ordre public (public order). This has led to several notable cases where Swiss courts have overruled Iranian family law provisions. In 2015, an Iranian father accused of murdering his wife and threatening his daughter was denied parental authority over his three minor children, who were placed under the care of a court-appointed guardian in the Canton of Bern. Similarly, in 2020, the Federal Supreme Court rejected an Iranian man's attempt to avoid paying alimony to his estranged Iranian wife, despite his appeal to a family court in Tehran.

=== 2025 treaty modification ===
The continued application of Iranian family law has drawn criticism from Swiss politicians and legal experts. On June 6, 2025, the Swiss Federal Council announced it had sent for consultation a modification to the Convention of Establishment that would effectively end the application of Iranian family law to Iranian nationals in Switzerland. Under the proposed changes, Iranian nationals domiciled in Switzerland would be subject to general rules of private international law, which typically apply the law of the country of residence—in this case, Swiss law.

The Swiss government cited several reasons for the change: Iranian law significantly differs from Swiss principles, is difficult for Swiss judges to access and interpret (requiring costly expert opinions), and lengthens judicial procedures. While Switzerland will apply the law of domicile to Iranian nationals, Iran will continue to apply the law of origin, meaning Swiss nationals in Iran will remain subject to Swiss personal status, family, and inheritance law.

The consultation period for the treaty modification was set to end on September 29, 2025, after which the Federal Department of Justice and Police will prepare a message for Parliament, which must approve international treaty modifications containing important legal provisions through a federal decree.

The proposed changes affect approximately 5,000 Iranian nationals living in Switzerland and represent a significant shift in the bilateral legal relationship that has existed for over 90 years.

== Notable Monarchy-era Iranians who lived and studied in Switzerland ==
Former Iranian Prime Minister, Mohammad Mosaddegh obtained his Doctorate of Laws (doctorat en droit) at the University of Neuchâtel in Switzerland, 1911. As a child, Mohammad Reza Pahlavi, the Shah of Iran attended Institut Le Rosey, a Swiss boarding school, completing his studies there in 1935.

== See also ==
- Foreign relations of Iran
- Foreign relations of Switzerland
- Johann Rudolf Stadler
- Naftiran Intertrade
- Pizza Connection Trial
- EU-Iran Forum
- Swiss Iranian Investment Forum
