= AloPeyk =

On-Demand Delivery Service in Iran

- Company type: Private company
- Industry: Technology, delivery, transportation
- Founded: September 2016; 9 years ago
- Founder: Mehdi Nayebi and Mehrshad Pezeshk
- Headquarters: Tehran, Iran
- Website: alopeyk.com

AloPeyk is an on-demand delivery company based in Iran. It was founded in 2016.

== History ==
AloPeyk was founded in September 2016 by Mehdi Nayebi and Mehrshad Pezeshk who moved from Europe to Tehran to start the company. By 2017, the company was reported to deliver 10,000 packages per day. The app was removed from the App Store by Apple that year in compliance with U.S. sanctions against Iran.

In 2018, the Financial Times reported that AloPeyk had hired 50,000 motorcycle couriers and 10,000 van drivers since its founding. To fund its expansion, the company received investments in 2019 from Turquoise Partners and others. In 2021, the company claimed to have shipped 75 million packages since its founding, and to have 15,000 active daily drivers on its platform.

== Operations ==
The company was reported to have gained initial market share by offering lower prices than its competitors enabled by utilizing algorithms and computer software to reduce the idle time of its delivery drivers to lower costs.

== See also ==
- Snapp!
- Technology start-ups in Iran
- Package delivery
