= Bougartchev Moyne Associés =

Bougartchev Moyne Associés AARPI
- Native name: Bougartchev Moyne Associés
- Type: Private
- Industry: White-collar crime, regulatory investigations, litigation
- Genre: Law firm
- Founded: January 2, 2017 in Paris, France
- Founders: Kiril Bougartchev, Emmanuel Moyne
- Headquarters: Paris, France
- Area served: Multinational
- Website: bougartchev-moyne.com

Bougartchev Moyne Associés AARPI is a French law firm founded in 2017 by Kiril Bougartchev and Emmanuel Moyne of Linklaters. The firm represents clients in white-collar crime, regulatory and commercial disputes, and provides compliance or investigations programs. With clients varying from major financial institutions and industrial and insurance companies to individuals, publications such as Décideurs, Legal 500, and Chambers Europe have ranked the firm among the best in Europe and France.

== History ==
The litigation firm Bougartchev Moyne Associés opened on January 2, 2017, in Saint-Germain-des-Prés in Paris. The two founders Kiril Bougartchev and Emmanuel Moyne, both business crime lawyers for 30 and 20 years respectively, had previously worked for Gide and then Linklaters in Paris. Bougartchev Moyne Associés sponsored the International Bar Association (IBA) Anti-Corruption Conference in June 2017 in Paris.

In 2017, the Chambers Europe guide named the firm among its ranked lawyers, among band 1 law firms in white-collar crime and band 2 firms in corporate compliance and investigations. The firm was also granted awards by the French Décideurs magazine, which named Bougartchev Moyne Associés one of the "essential" Top 2017 Law Firms in France for business criminal law in 2017. It also named the firm "excellent" among the Top 2017 Law Firms in France for international investigation. The Legal 500 guide named the firm among the best ones in two categories of its 2017 ranking, i.e. white-collar crime as well as commercial and corporate litigation. The partners of the firm participated in round-table discussions at the Global Anti-Corruption Summit organized by the Business & Legal Forum in March 2017. In September 2017, Chambers and Partners published Anti-Corruption 2018, with the "France" chapter written by the firm.

In January 2021, Bougartchev Moyne Associés named a third partner, Geoffroy Goubin. He has been an attorney at the firm since it was formed. He was previously at Debevoise & Plimpton, then at Linklaters, where an association with the two firm founders began.

== Services ==
By July 2017, 65% of the firm's activity was dedicated to white-collar crime, 25% to commercial litigation, and 10% to compliance. The firm is primarily known for all aspects of business criminal law, and it also handles other forms of litigation such as civil law and commercial law. The firm advises companies on regulatory matters and negotiations in France and abroad, and beyond corruption cases it handles "emergency, complex, transnational or multi-jurisdictional procedures." The firm also arranges for compliance training programs, notably in accordance with the Sapin 2 Act. By July 2017, the firm consisted of twelve lawyers along with additional staff.

== Clientele and cases ==
By July 2017, the firm was working on around 90 open cases, including both long-term clients and new clients. Clients include institutional investors, managers, and other types of companies, both public and private in the fields of energy, defense, industry, aerospace, pharmacy, banking, finance, insurance, and luxury goods.

Notable clients and cases include DCNI, civil plaintiff in a criminal trial resulting from the 2002 Karachi bombing investigation which implicated Édouard Balladur and Nicolas Sarkozy in a kickback scheme with Pakistan, dubbed "Karachigate"; Princess Hassa bint Salman of Saudi Arabia; Jean-Vincent Placé; MP Thierry Solere, who had reported the lenient prison conditions granted to Salah Abdeslam; François Reyl, in the Cahuzac affair, effecting the first settlement with the resultant French National Financial Prosecutor's office (Parquet national financier; PNF) of the Ministry of Justice, in 2016; Michel Meïni; and Marie Fillon.
