= Belinda Bencic =

Swiss tennis player (born 1997)

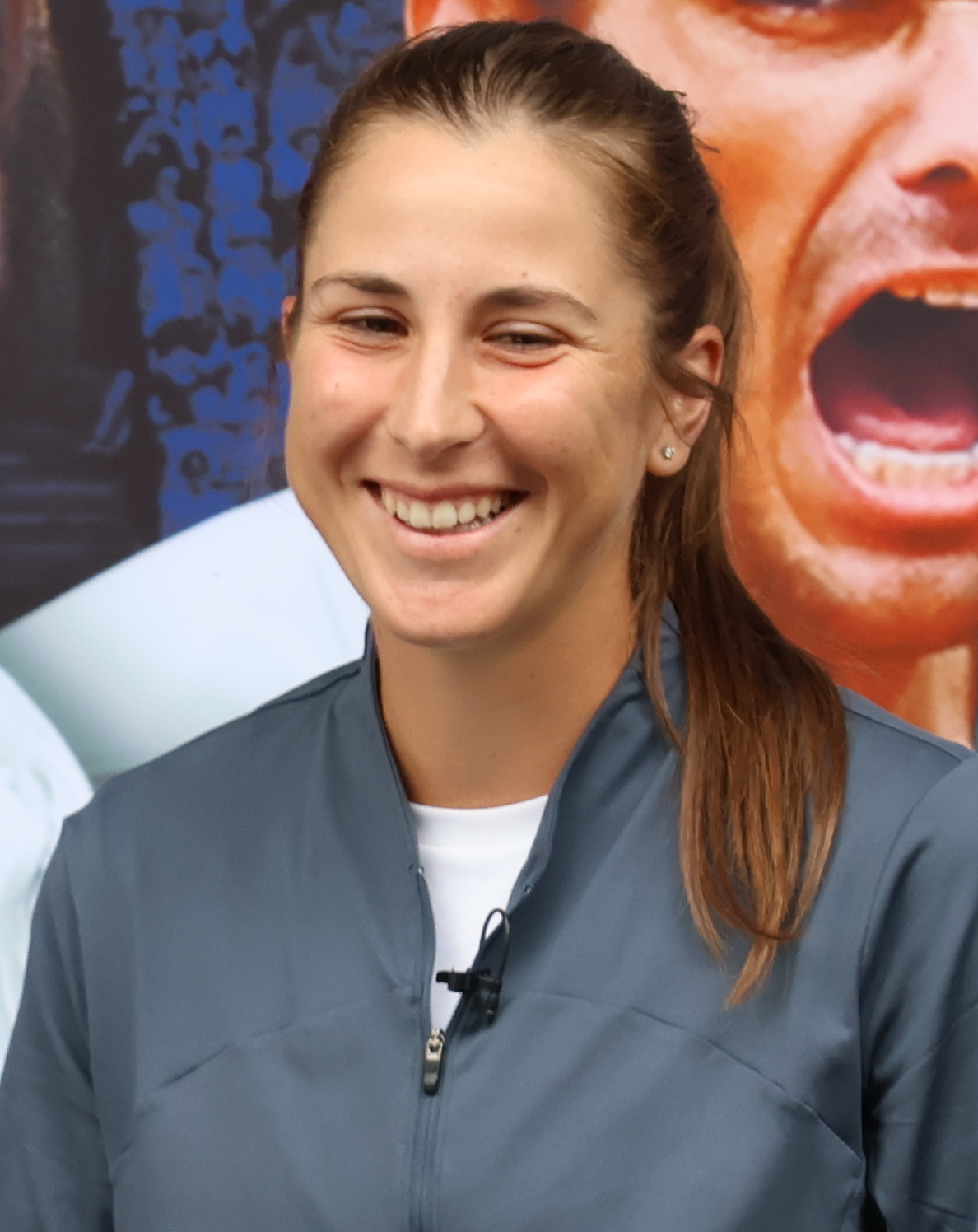
- Bencic at the 2023 DC Open
- Country (sports): Switzerland
- Residence: Wollerau, Switzerland
- Born: 10 March 1997 (age 29) Flawil, Switzerland
- Height: 1.75 m (5 ft 9 in)
- Turned pro: 2012
- Plays: Right-handed (two-handed backhand)
- Prize money: US$ 17,476,910

Singles
- Career record: 458–236
- Career titles: 10
- Highest ranking: No. 4 (17 February 2020)
- Current ranking: No. 19 (2 November 2026)

Grand Slam singles results
- Australian Open: 4R (2016, 2023, 2025)
- French Open: 4R (2026)
- Wimbledon: SF (2025)
- US Open: SF (2019)

Other tournaments
- Tour Finals: SF (2019)
- Olympic Games: W (2021)

Doubles
- Career record: 78–66
- Career titles: 2
- Highest ranking: No. 59 (1 February 2016)
- Current ranking: No. 1,613 (2 November 2026)

Grand Slam doubles results
- Australian Open: 2R (2016, 2023)
- French Open: 3R (2015)
- Wimbledon: 2R (2014, 2015, 2022)
- US Open: 1R (2014, 2015, 2016, 2018)

Other doubles tournaments
- Olympic Games: F (2021)

Grand Slam mixed doubles results
- Wimbledon: 3R (2014)
- US Open: F (2026)

Team competitions
- Fed Cup: W (2022); Record: 27–9
- Hopman Cup: W (2018, 2019)
Medal record
Representing Switzerland
Olympic Games
Gold medal – first place	2020 Tokyo	Singles
Silver medal – second place	2020 Tokyo	Doubles
- Last updated on: 2 November 2026.

Belinda Bencic (pronounced [ˈbelinda ˈbentʂitʂ]; born 10 March 1997) is a Swiss professional tennis player. She has been ranked by the WTA as high as world No. 4 in singles, which she achieved on 17 February 2020, and No. 59 in doubles, attained on 1 February 2016.

Bencic has won ten Tour singles titles, the most significant being a gold medal at the 2020 Tokyo Olympics. She also earned two doubles trophies on the WTA Tour, as well as a mixed doubles title at the 2026 Indian Wells Open, partnering with Flavio Cobolli.

A former junior world No. 1, Bencic won two junior major singles titles in 2013 at the French Open and Wimbledon. On the professional tour, she made her top 100 debut shortly after turning 17. Her breakthrough came at the 2014 US Open, where she became the youngest quarterfinalist since Martina Hingis in 1997. Bencic won her first two WTA Tour titles in 2015, including the Canadian Open where she defeated four of the top six players in the world. She then made her top-ten debut the following year aged 18.

From 2016 through 2018, Bencic struggled with a variety of injuries, dropping outside the top 300 in the rankings. She then posted her best season to date in 2019: winning her second Premier-5 title at the Dubai Championships, reaching her first major semifinal at the US Open, qualifying for her first WTA Finals (where she reached the semifinals), and finishing the year inside the top 10 for the first time, which helped her win the WTA Comeback Player of the Year award. In 2021, Bencic won her biggest career title by claiming the gold medal at the Tokyo Olympics, also winning silver in the women's doubles. Following a maternity leave starting in September 2023, Bencic returned to the tour in 2024.

== Early life and background ==
Bencic was born in Flawil in northeastern Switzerland to Dana and Ivan Benčič. Her parents were both born in Czechoslovakia, but her father's family emigrated to Switzerland in 1968 to escape the Warsaw Pact invasion by the Soviet Union. Her father was a professional ice hockey player in the Swiss National League A and National League B before becoming an insurance broker. Her mother was a high-level handball player. Bencic hit her first tennis balls at the age of two and began training with her father, who was also a recreational tennis player, for one hour per day at the age of four. She entered her first national tournament at that age, losing to an opponent six years older in straight sets without winning a game. Bencic would regularly face much older opponents as a child and was encouraged by her father to try to win two games per set.

When Bencic was five years old, her father contacted fellow Czechoslovak immigrant Melanie Molitor, the mother and coach of world No. 1 Swiss tennis player, Martina Hingis, for coaching advice. Hingis becoming the top player in the world around the time Bencic was born was also one reason her father was inspired to introduce her to the sport of tennis. Molitor agreed to gauge Bencic's abilities, which led to Bencic working with Molitor once a week for about a year. At the age of six, Bencic also spent six months at Nick Bollettieri's academy in Florida, winning several under-10 tournaments. Around this time, her father also asked Marcel Niederer, a childhood friend and fellow hockey player who had become an entrepreneur, if he could help sponsor his daughter's career. Niederer agreed to invest in Bencic, which gave her father the ability to quit his job so he could spend more time traveling with and coaching his daughter while she competed at tournaments. In 2004, when Bencic was seven years old, her family moved to Wollerau, where Molitor had just opened up her own academy, so that she could train there every day. She continued to work with Molitor through her teenage years, and has also occasionally worked with Hingis.

== Career ==
=== Juniors ===
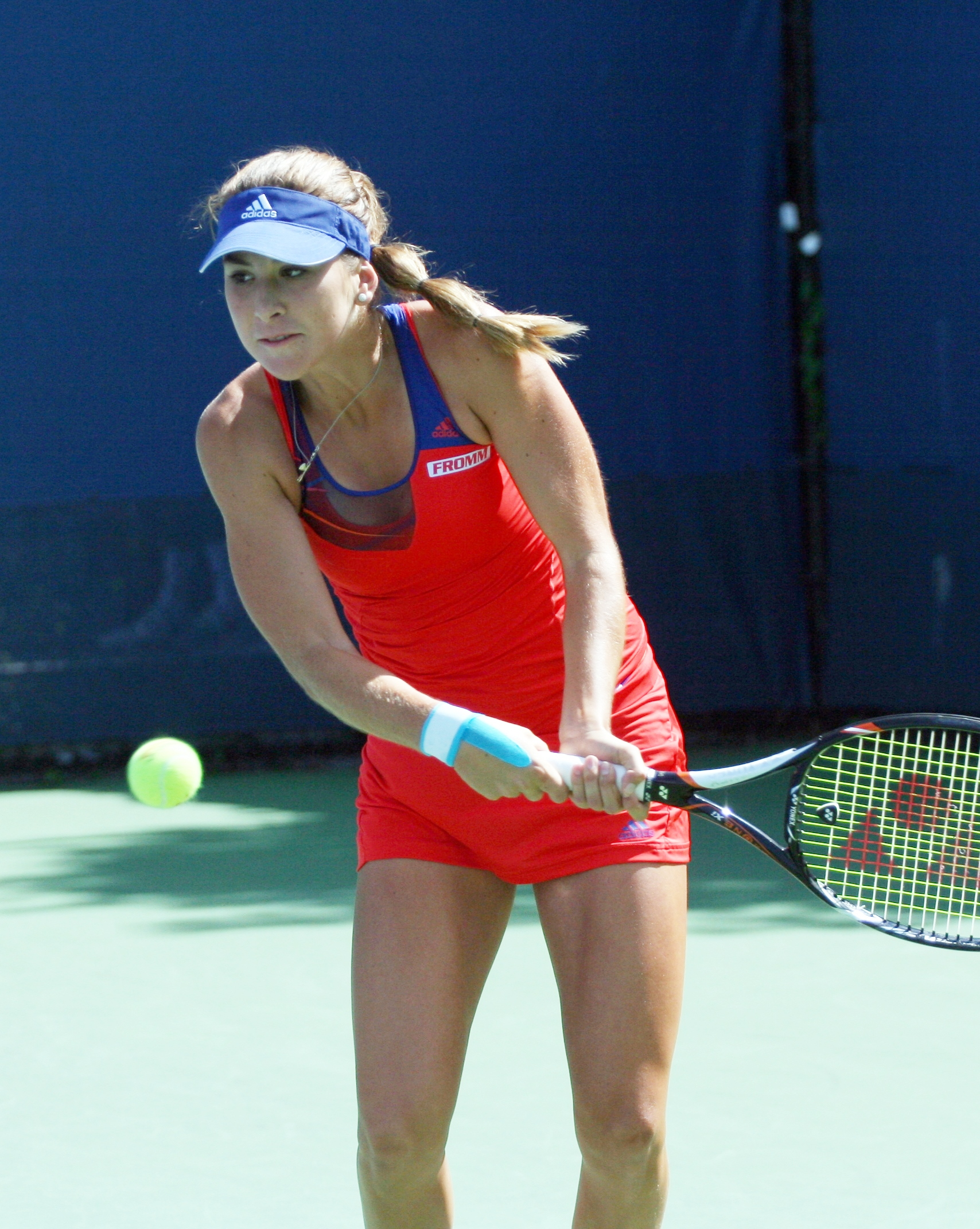
Bencic at the 2013 US Open

Bencic is a former world No. 1 junior. She began competing on the ITF Junior Circuit in 2010 at the age of 13, reaching the final in her debut event at the lowest-level Grade 5 Luzern Junior Competition in Switzerland. In early 2012, Bencic won two high-level Grade 1 events at the Czech International Junior Indoor Championships and the Open International Junior de Beaulieu-sur-Mer in France, the first of which coming at 14 years old. She also made her junior Grand Slam debut, playing in all of the major tournaments except the Australian Open. Although she won just two matches in total in singles, she finished runner-up in doubles at both Wimbledon and the US Open. Partnering with Ana Konjuh at Wimbledon she lost to Eugenie Bouchard of Canada and American Taylor Townsend. At the US Open she played with Petra Uberalová, losing to Townsend and compatriot Gabrielle Andrews. Bencic closed out the year by winning her first Grade A title at the Abierto Juvenil Mexicano, losing just 15 games in six matches.

Bencic did not play again on the junior tour until May 2013, instead opting to focus on professional events. When she returned to the juniors, she won her first five tournaments of the year and extended her win streak in singles to 39 matches. All of her titles were Grade 1 or higher, including three Grade A titles at the Trofeo Bonfiglio and two Grand Slam events, the French Open and Wimbledon. She defeated Antonia Lottner in the French Open final and Townsend in the Wimbledon final. The victory over Townsend was a rematch of their quarterfinal at the French Open, which finished 9–7 in the third and final set. Bencic became the first player to win the girls' singles titles at the French Open and Wimbledon in the same year since Amélie Mauresmo in 1996. She was also the first Swiss girl to win a junior Grand Slam singles title since Martina Hingis in 1994, who won the same two titles that year. Bencic's win streak was ended at the European Junior Championships by Barbora Krejčíková in the semifinals. Lottner then defeated her at the US Open in the quarterfinals in her last tournament of the year. She also had a third Grand Slam runner-up finish in doubles at the US Open, losing to the Czech team of Krejčíková and Kateřina Siniaková alongside Sara Sorribes Tormo. With her success, Bencic became the world No. 1 junior in June and finished the season with the top ranking to earn the title of ITF Junior World Champion.

=== 2011–13: Professional beginnings ===
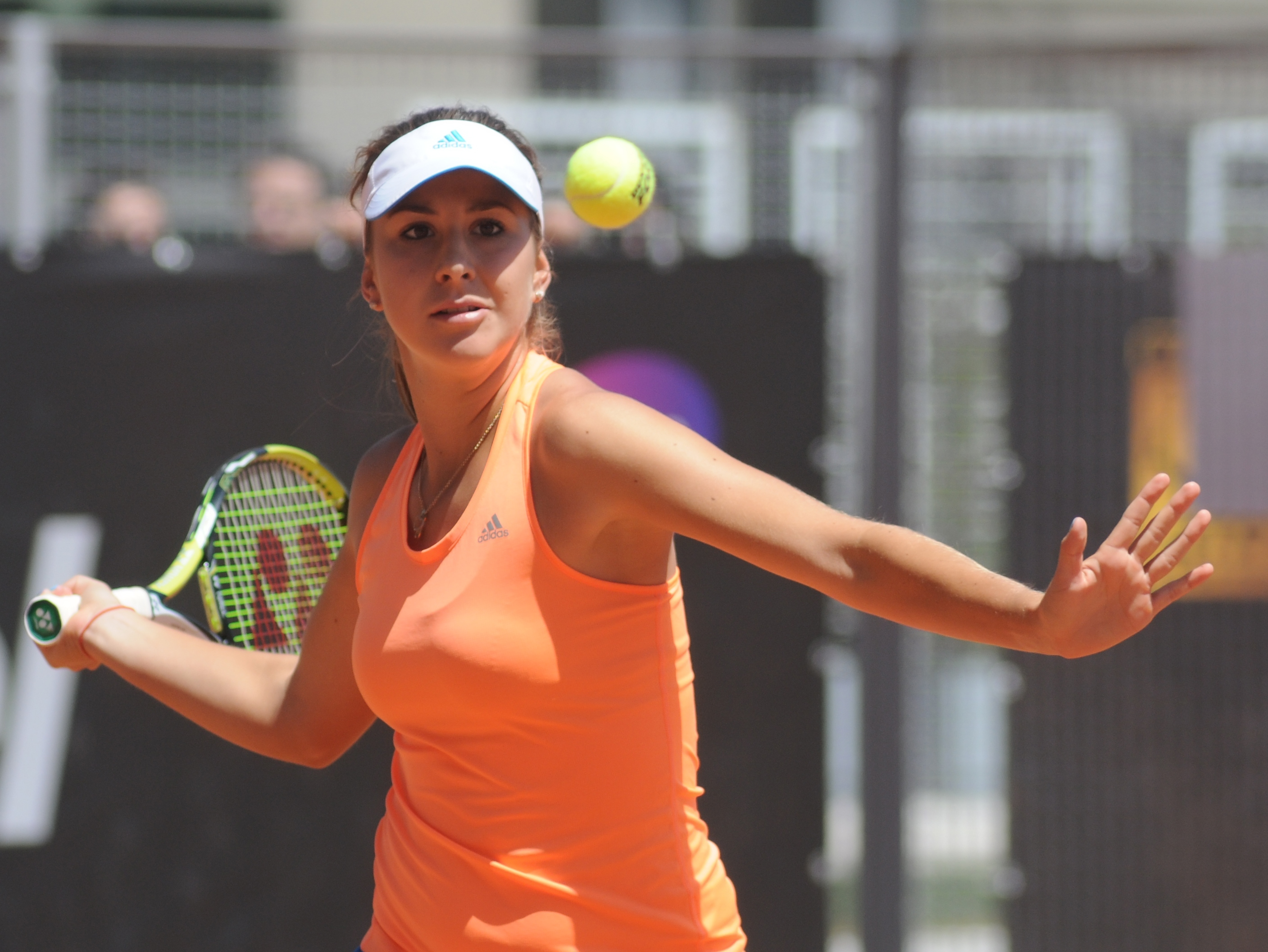
Bencic at the 2014 Italian Open

Bencic entered her first professional tournament on the ITF Women's Circuit in March 2011 in Fällanden, Switzerland, shortly after her 14th birthday. She reached the quarterfinals as a qualifier, recording her first ITF main-draw win over compatriot Tess Sugnaux. Bencic received a wildcard to make her WTA Tour main-draw debut at the 2012 Luxembourg Open, where she lost to Venus Williams. The tournament came a few weeks after Bencic had won her first two ITF singles titles in back-to-back weeks at Sharm El Sheikh in Egypt, also winning the doubles title in the first week. In 2013, Bencic progressed from $10k to $25k and $50k tier events. Her best results in the first half of the year were a singles semifinal at the $50k Indian Harbour Beach Pro Tennis Classic in the United States and a doubles title at the $25k event in Lenzerheide, Switzerland. Bencic played in three WTA Tour main draws in the second half of the year. After losing at the Swedish Open in July, she won her first career WTA main-draw match as a wild card at the Pan Pacific Open against Daria Gavrilova. She also won a match the following week at the Japan Women's Open. In her last event of 2013, Bencic reached the semifinals of the $75k Dunlop World Challenge in Tokyo to break into the top 200 for the first time. She finished the year ranked at No. 184, a vast improvement from her ranking of No. 612 in January.

=== 2014: US Open quarterfinals, Newcomer of the Year ===
Despite beginning 2014 well outside of the top-100, Bencic only played in WTA Tour-level events throughout the year. She made her Grand Slam debut at the Australian Open, qualifying for the main draw. She defeated Kimiko Date-Krumm in the first round in a matchup of the oldest and second-youngest players in the draw before losing to the eventual champion Li Na in her next match. Bencic did not win another main-draw match until April when she made it to the semifinals as a qualifier at the Charleston Open in her first clay court event of the year. She defeated four top 100 players at the tournament, including No. 29 Maria Kirilenko and No. 11 Sara Errani. With these results, she also made her top-100 debut less than a month after turning 17. Her clay-court season ended at Roland Garros with another loss to No. 29 Venus Williams. Bencic improved on that performance at each of her next two major events. After reaching the third round at Wimbledon, she made it to the quarterfinals at the US Open. During the tournament, she recorded the first two top-ten victories of her career over No. 7 Angelique Kerber, and No. 10 Jelena Janković, to become the youngest quarterfinalist at the US Open since Hingis in 1997. Thanks to her success at the major tournaments she rose to No. 33 in the world after the event. Bencic closed out the year by reaching her first WTA tournament final at the Tianjin Open, where she finished runner-up to Alison Riske. At the end of the season, she was named WTA Newcomer of the Year.

=== 2015: Premier 5 title, world No. 12 ===
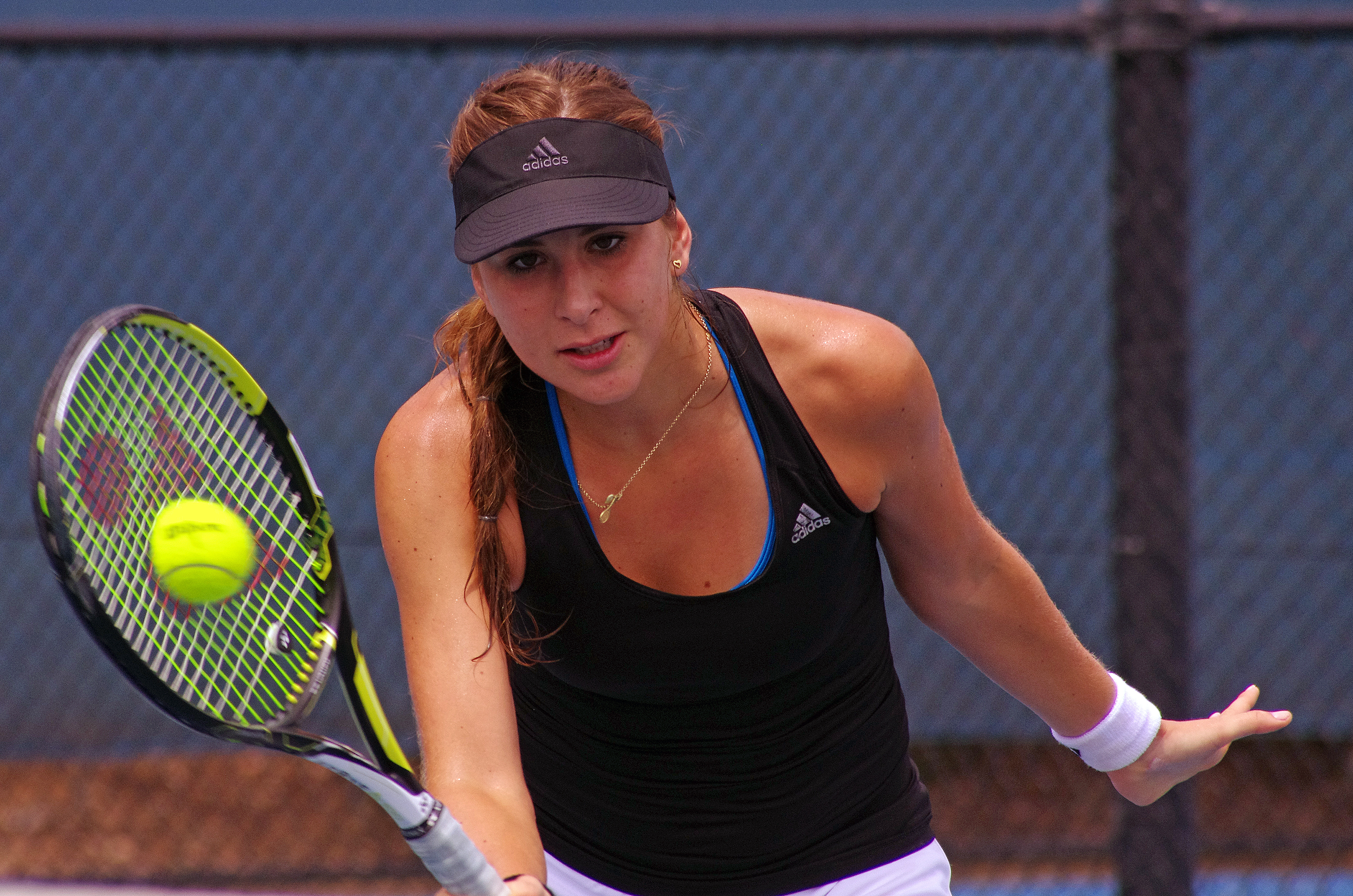
Bencic at the 2015 Sydney International

Bencic struggled in the first half of 2015. Through the French Open at the end of May, she won multiple matches in the same event only twice, reaching the fourth round at both the Indian Wells Open and the Miami Open. At Indian Wells, she notably won a match against No. 5 Caroline Wozniacki, the highest-ranked player she had ever defeated at the time. Bencic lost in the opening round at the Australian Open and the second round at the French Open. She began to turn her year around during the grass-court season. In the lead-up to Wimbledon, she made her second and third career WTA finals. After finishing runner-up to Camila Giorgi at the Rosmalen Championships, she won the Eastbourne International over Agnieszka Radwańska for her maiden WTA title. Bencic then improved on her previous year's result at Wimbledon by reaching the fourth round.

At the Premier-level Canadian Open in August, Bencic produced her best performance of the year to win the title. During her run, she defeated six of the top 25 players in the world, including four of the top six, and her third victory of the year against No. 5, Caroline Wozniacki. In the last two rounds, she recorded her first victory over a current world No. 1 player in Serena Williams, before beating No. 3 Simona Halep in the final; Halep needed to retire in the third set due to heat illness. Serena had entered the tournament with only one loss on the season, having won the first three majors of the year. With the title, Bencic became No. 12 in the world. She ended the summer with a third-round loss at the US Open to Venus Williams. Bencic reached another final later that month at the Pan Pacific Open. During the event, she recorded two more top ten victories, including a fourth over Wozniacki, before finishing runner-up to Radwańska in their second final of the year. In early October, Bencic ended her season early due to leg and hand injuries. As a result, she withdrew from the WTA Elite Trophy, the second-tier year-end championship, despite qualifying for the event.

=== 2016–17: Top 10 debut, injury layoffs ===
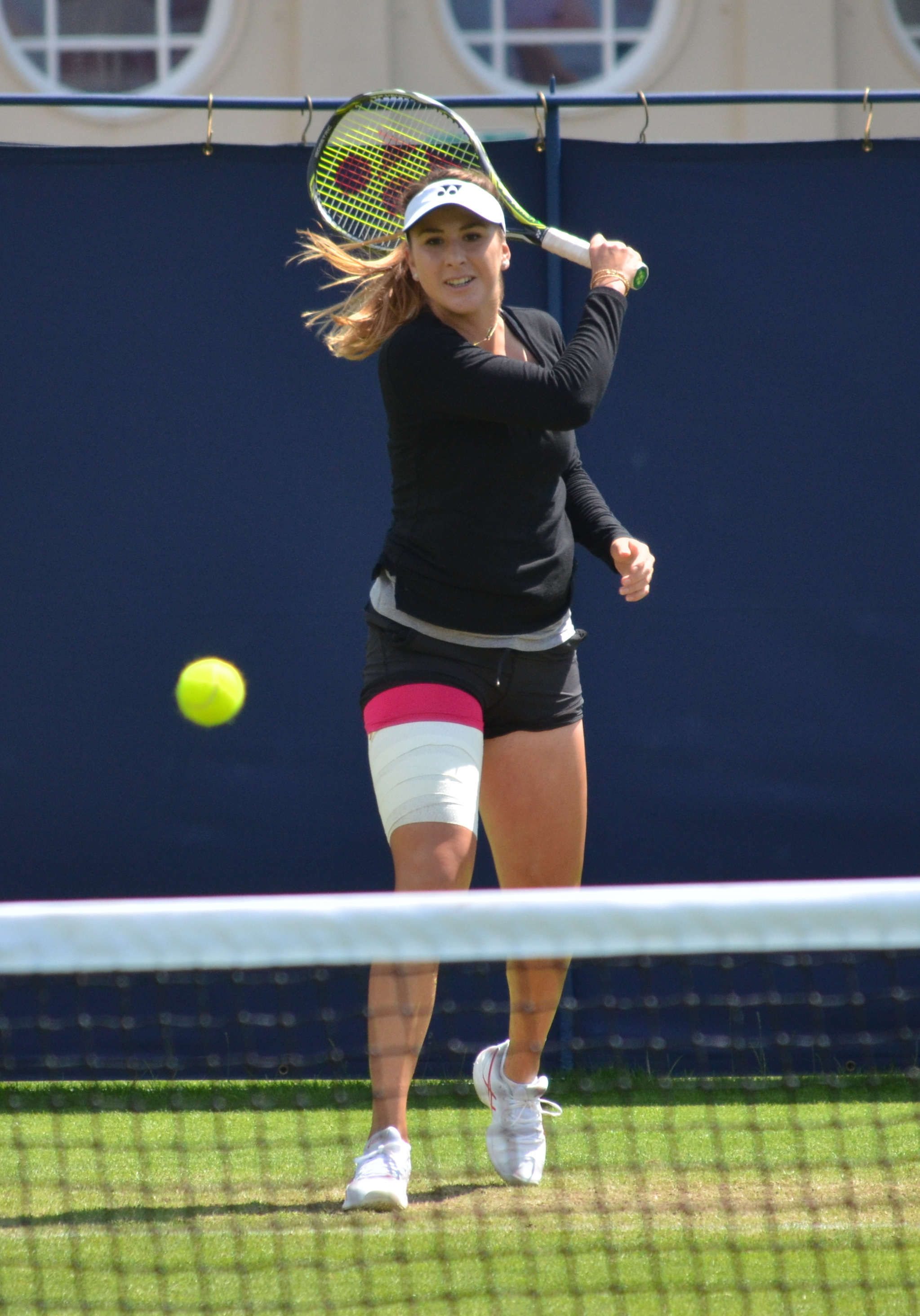
Bencic at the 2016 Eastbourne International

Bencic returned to the tour for the Australian hardcourt season. She had a strong start to the year, reaching the semifinals at the Sydney International and losing in the fourth round at the Australian Open to No. 5, Maria Sharapova. At the St. Petersburg Trophy, Bencic was the top seed and finished runner-up to Roberta Vinci. This performance helped her enter the top-10 for the first time while still 18 years old, making her the first teenager in the top 10 of the WTA rankings since Caroline Wozniacki in 2009. After St. Petersburg, Bencic began to struggle. She retired from her second-round match at Miami and was forced to miss nearly the entire clay-court season due to a back injury, including the French Open. Bencic returned for the grass-court season, but could not match her level of success prior to being injured. She recorded multiple wins at just two more events the rest of the year, the Rosmalen Championships where she reached the semifinals and the US Open where she reached the third round. She also had to retire from her second-round match at Wimbledon due to a wrist injury. As a result, Bencic fell to world No. 43 by the end of the season.

Bencic continued to struggle at the beginning of 2017. She recorded just one WTA Tour singles match-win through the first four months of the year. In late April, she underwent surgery on her left wrist that was expected to keep her out for several months. She did not return until September, at which point her ranking had dropped to No. 312 in the world. Bencic was able to rise back into the top 200 in just one week after winning her first comeback tournament, the $100k Neva Cup. She then received a wildcard to play at the Linz Open and made the quarterfinals in her only WTA Tour event before the end of the season. Bencic finished the year by winning three tournaments in a row in Asia. She won two WTA 125 events in back-to-back weeks in November at the Hua Hin Championships and the Taipei Challenger before also winning the $100k Al Habtoor Challenge in Dubai one month later. With these three titles, she moved back into the top 100, ending the year at No. 74 in the world.

=== 2018: Slow ascent back into top 50 ===
Bencic made her return to the Grand Slam tournaments at the Australian Open. After defeating the previous year's runner-up, Venus Williams, she was upset by qualifier Luksika Kumkhum in the next round.

A stress fracture in her foot sidelined her from mid-March to late May, when she made her return at the French Open reached to the second round. She did better at Wimbledon, matching her career-best result of a fourth-round appearance highlighted by a first-round upset of No. 6, Caroline Garcia, and saving four match points in her second-round win against Alison Riske. This performance put her back in the top 50. Later that summer, Bencic lost her opening round match at the US Open. In the last stage of the season, Bencic reached her only WTA final of the year, finishing runner-up to top seed and world No. 9, Julia Görges, at the Luxembourg Open as a qualifier. After the end of the WTA Tour season, she entered several ITF and WTA 125 events to try to defend some of her rankings points from the previous year. Bencic won the $80k title at the Red Rock Pro Open in Las Vegas, but still dropped from inside to No. 54 by the start of 2019.

=== 2019: Two titles, first major semifinal ===
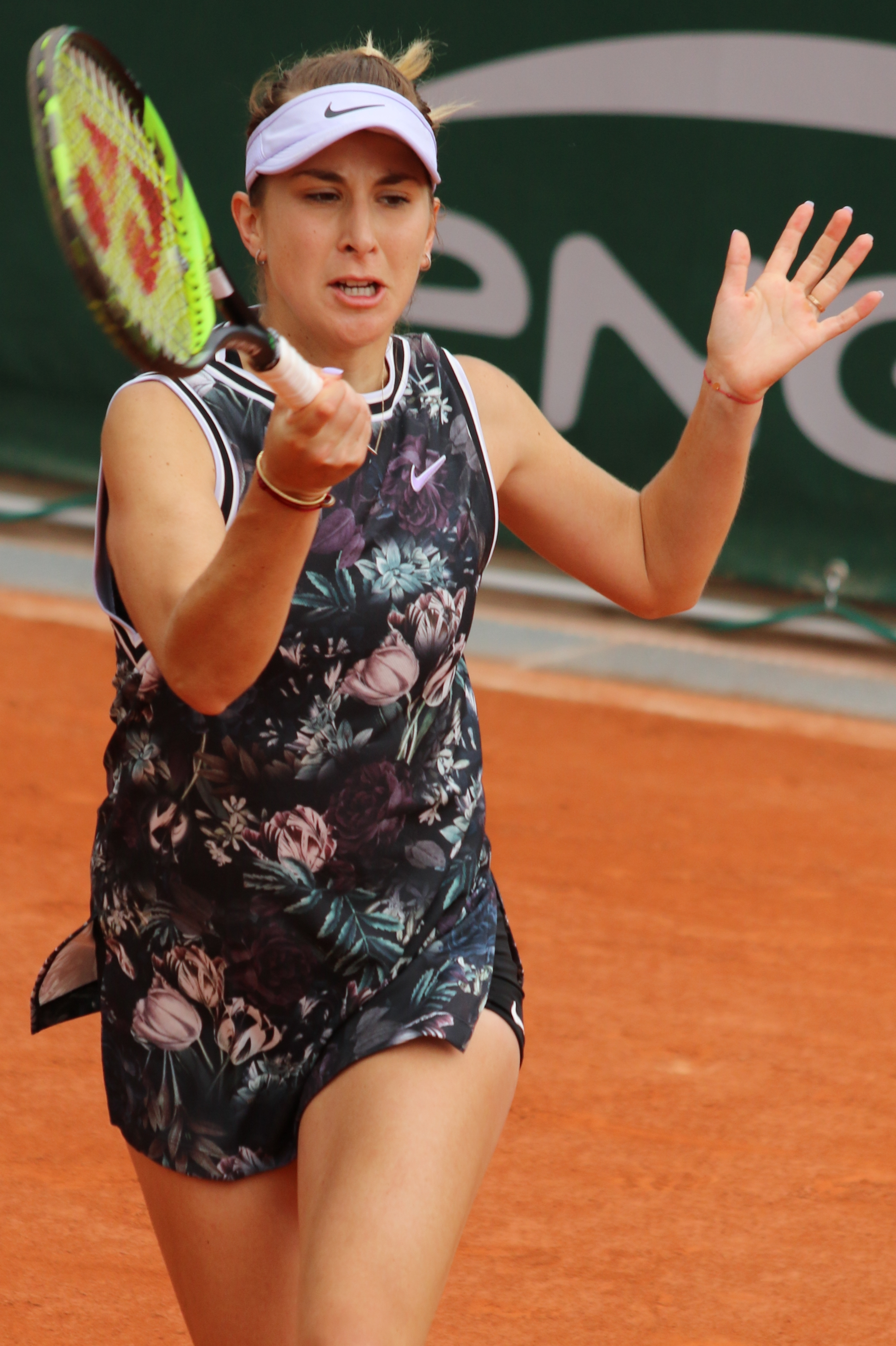
Bencic at the 2019 French Open

Despite being back outside of the top 50, Bencic had a strong start to 2019. She reached the semifinals at the Hobart International and made it to the third round at the Australian Open, losing to eventual finalist Petra Kvitová. Her next breakthrough came at the Dubai Championships. As an unseeded player, she defeated four top-ten players in the last four matches to win her third WTA singles title and second at the Premier 5-level. In order, she recorded wins over No. 9 Aryna Sabalenka, No. 2 Simona Halep, No. 6 Elina Svitolina, and No. 4 Petra Kvitová, all in three sets and two of which in a final set tiebreak. The title helped her rise to world No. 23. Bencic continued her win streak with a semifinal appearance at the Indian Wells Open. She defeated two more top-ten players in No. 1, Naomi Osaka, and No. 5 Karolina Plíšková before losing to No. 8, Angelique Kerber. In the lead-up to the French Open, Bencic produced another Premier Mandatory semifinal at the Madrid Open. She recorded another world-number-one win over Osaka, but could not defeat Halep in a tight three-set match. After the tournament, she moved up to No. 15. At the French Open, she advanced to the third round for the first time, where she was defeated by No. 24 Donna Vekić. During the grass-court season, Bencic made her second WTA final of the year at the Mallorca Open. After defeating top seed and world No. 6 Kerber, she finished runner-up to Sofia Kenin, after having three match points in the second set. Like at the Australian Open and the French Open, she lost in the third round at Wimbledon.

Bencic only played the two Premier 5 tournaments in the lead-up to the US Open, with her best result a third-round appearance at the Canadian Open. At the US Open, Bencic produced the best Grand Slam result of her career to date. In the fourth round, she defeated defending champion and world No. 1 Osaka for the third time this season. She went on to make the semifinals, where she lost to eventual champion Bianca Andreescu. This result put her back in the top 10 for the first time since June 2016. Bencic then finished the season strong by winning her second title of the year at the Kremlin Cup as a wildcard. She defeated hometown favourite Anastasia Pavlyuchenkova in the final, which helped her jump ahead of Kiki Bertens and Serena Williams to qualify for the WTA Finals for the first time. At the year-end championships, Bencic was grouped with Ashleigh Barty, Petra Kvitová, and Naomi Osaka, the latter of whom was replaced by Bertens after one match. After losing her opening match to Barty, Bencic defeated Kvitová and Bertens to advance to the knockout rounds. Her season came to an end with a semifinal loss to Elina Svitolina. She finished the year at No. 8 in the world. At the end of the season, Bencic won the WTA Comeback Player of the Year for her return to the top 10.

=== 2020–21: Olympic singles champion, top 5 ===
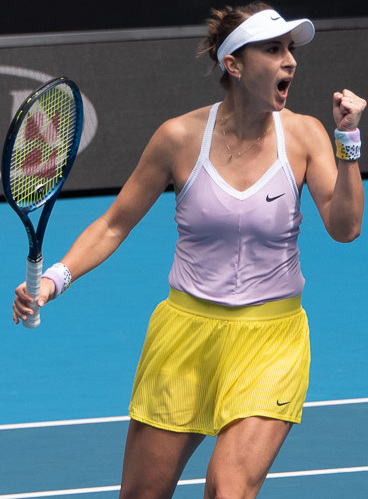
Bencic at the 2020 Australian Open

In February 2021, she reached the final of the WTA 500 Adelaide International event. At the German Open, Bencic reached her second final in the season but lost, after a stunning comeback from the qualifier Liudmila Samsonova. She had not won a title on the WTA 500-level in two years since she won the title in Moscow in 2019.

At the 2020 Tokyo Olympics, Bencic beat Jessica Pegula, Misaki Doi, French Open champion Barbora Krejčíková and Anastasia Pavlyuchenkova to reach the semifinals. A three-set victory over Elena Rybakina guaranteed Bencic a medal. She defeated Markéta Vondroušová in the final, to become the first Swiss woman to win the gold medal in singles. Bencic also won silver in the women's doubles, teaming up with Viktorija Golubic.

Bencic reached the quarterfinals of the US Open. Seeded 11th, Bencic beat Arantxa Rus, Martina Trevisan, Jessica Pegula, and Iga Świątek without dropping a set, before losing in straight sets to eventual champion Emma Raducanu.

=== 2022: Miami semifinal, first clay title ===
Bencic started her season at Sydney, she defeated Beatriz Haddad Maia, Océane Dodin to reach the quarterfinals. Then she lost to eventual champion Paula Badosa.

At the Australian Open, Bencic lost to Amanda Anisimova in the second round. In St. Petersburg, she lost to eventual champion, Anett Kontaveit, in the quarterfinals. In Doha, she lost to Clara Tauson in the first round.

Bencic entered the Indian Wells Open, and as the 22nd seed received a bye in first round, but then lost to Kaia Kanepi in second. She played in Miami seeded 22nd again, where she defeated Marta Kostyuk, Heather Watson, and Aliaksandra Sasnovich to reach her first Miami quarterfinal. Then she beat Daria Saville to made her first ever Miami semifinal. In the semifinal, she lost to Naomi Osaka.

Bencic entered the Charleston Open as the tenth seed and defeated Wang Xiyu, Linda Fruhvirtová and Madison Keys to reach the quarterfinals. Then she beat world No. 3, Paula Badosa, for the first time in four meetings to make the semifinals. In the semifinals, she defeated Ekaterina Alexandrova to reach her first WTA clay court final. Then she defeated fourth seed Ons Jabeur to win her first ever WTA clay-court title and sixth overall. However, Bencic lost to Ons Jabeur in the round of 16 at her next event, the Madrid Open. At the French Open, she lost in the third round to Leylah Fernandez, in three sets, at her first meeting between them.

Bencic entered the German Open as eighth seed, and made it to the final losing to top seed Ons Jabeur. At Wimbledon, she lost in the first round to Wang Qiang. At the WTA 1000 Canadian Open she reached the quarterfinals, before losing to Beatriz Haddad Maia.

=== 2023: Two titles and return to top 10 ===
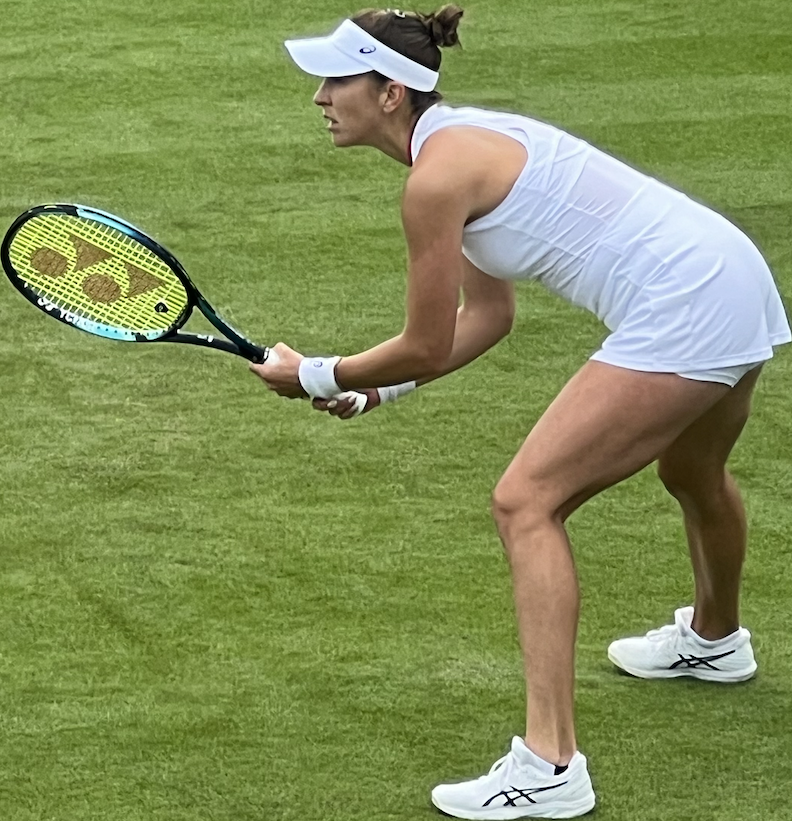
Bencic at the 2023 Wimbledon Championships

In Adelaide, she reached the final by defeating Garbiñe Muguruza, Anna Kalinskaya, world No. 4 Caroline Garcia, and Veronika Kudermetova, who withdrew from the semifinals. Then, she beat fifth seed Daria Kasatkina in a loopsided match to win her seventh WTA Tour title. As a result, she returned to the top 10, for the first time since 28 September 2020. At the Australian Open, she defeated Viktoriya Tomova, Claire Liu and Camila Giorgi to reach the round of 16 in which she lost to fifth seed and eventual champion Aryna Sabalenka. Her next tournament was the Abu Dhabi Open where, as second seed, she defeated Marta Kostyuk, qualifier Shelby Rogers and Beatriz Haddad Maia to make her 17th final overall and second of the season. She defeated Liudmila Samsonova to win her eighth title, after saving three match points.

In May, she lost in the first round of the French Open against Russian lucky loser Elina Avanesyan in three sets. She then reached the last 16 at Wimbledon where she ended up losing to world No. 1, Iga Świątek, despite holding two match points in the second set. She had previously dispatched British wildcard Katie Swan in straight sets in the first round before fighting her way past Danielle Collins 7–6 in the deciding set in the second round and easing her way through her next match by easily dismissing Magda Linette. In June, at Wimbledon, Bencic equalled her best-ever showing at this major by reaching the fourth round with wins over wildcard entrant Katie Swan, Danielle Collins and 23rd seed Magda Linette, before losing to top seed Iga Świątek.

Moving onto the North American hardcourt swing of the season, she made back-to-back quarterfinals at the Washington Open and Canadian Open, losing to Coco Gauff and Liudmila Samsonova respectively. Having not played since September, Bencic announced in November that she was pregnant.

=== 2024: Maternity and return to WTA Tour ===
In October, six months after giving birth to her daughter, Bencic returned to the competitive court at an ITF event in Hamburg and the following month played a second low-level tournament in Luxembourg where she reached the quarterfinals. She then helped Switzerland defeat Serbia in the Billie Jean King Cup play-offs, winning her singles match against Lola Radivojević and teaming with Jil Teichmann to overcome Natalija Senić and Anja Stanković in the doubles.

Bencic received a wildcard entry into the WTA 125 Open Angers Arena Loire in December, defeating qualifier Patricia Maria Țig, Mariam Bolkvadze, sixth seed Océane Dodin and Dominika Šalková to reach the final, which she lost to third seed Alycia Parks in three sets. Despite her defeat in the championship match, she moved up more than 400 places in the WTA singles rankings and back into the top 500 at world No. 481 on 9 December 2024. Partnering fellow Swiss player Céline Naef, Bencic was also runner-up in the doubles at the same tournament, losing to Monica Niculescu and Elena-Gabriela Ruse in the final.

=== 2025: Abu Dhabi and Pan Pacific titles, Wimbledon semifinal ===
Bencic started her 2025 season representing Switzerland at the United Cup, where she defeated Chloé Paquet and then teamed with Dominic Stricker to overcome Edouard Roger-Vasselin and Elixane Lechemia in the doubles as they beat France in their opening contest. She lost to Jasmine Paolini as Switzerland were defeated by Italy in their second group tie and subsequently failed to reach the knockout stages. Bencic qualified for the Adelaide International and was a set up in her first-round match against seventh seed Anna Kalinskaya when her opponent retired due to injury. She lost in the second round to Liudmila Samsonova in three sets.

Using her protected ranking to enter the main draw at the Australian Open, Bencic defeated 16th seed Jelena Ostapenko and Suzan Lamens to reach the third round. She progressed to the round of 16 when her opponent, Naomi Osaka, retired due to injury after Bencic won the first set in a tiebreak. She lost her next match to third seed Coco Gauff in three sets.

Having received a wildcard into the Abu Dhabi Open, Bencic defeated Rebecca Šramková and then double bageled lucky loser Veronika Kudermetova to reach the quarterfinals, where she overcame wildcard entrant Markéta Vondroušová. In the semifinals, Bencic fought back from losing the first set to defeat top seed and defending champion Elena Rybakina. She defeated Ashlyn Krueger in the final after once again recovering from losing the first set. As a result, Bencic moved up 92 places in the WTA rankings to world No. 65 on 10 February 2025, reclaiming the position as the top Swiss player in the process.

In March at Indian Wells, Bencic recorded wins over Tatjana Maria, 17th seed Amanda Anisimova, 13th seed Diana Shnaider and third seed Coco Gauff to make it through to the quarterfinals, where she lost to fifth seed Madison Keys. Due to her run to the last eight, Bencic returned to the world's top 50 for the first time since February 2024, moving up to No. 45 in the WTA rankings on 17 March 2025. Bencic defeated Dayana Yastremska in the first round at the Miami Open, before losing to 22nd seed Elina Svitolina in her next match.

At the Madrid Open in April, she recorded wins over qualifier Zeynep Sönmez, 20th seed Clara Tauson and 16th seed Beatriz Haddad Maia to reach the fourth round, where she lost to fourth seed Coco Gauff.

In May, Bencic retired from the Italian Open due to an arm injury, after losing the opening set of her first round match against Maria Sakkari. She subsequently withdrew from the French Open having re-aggravated the injury in practice. Bencic made her return from injury in late June at the Bad Homburg Open, losing to eighth seed Ekaterina Alexandrova in the first round.

At Wimbledon, she defeated Alycia Parks, qualifier Elsa Jacquemot, Elisabetta Cocciaretto and 18th seed Ekaterina Alexandrova to reach the quarterfinals for the first time. In the last eight, Bencic overcame seventh seed Mirra Andreeva in straight sets to make it into her second major semifinal, which she lost to eighth seed and eventual champion Iga Świątek. As a result of her Wimbledon run, Bencic moved up to world No. 20 on 14 July.

Moving onto the North American hardcourt swing of the season at the Canadian Open, Bencic was given a bye in the first round due to her seeding at 17th and then defeated wildcard entrant Eugenie Bouchard to reach the third round, where she lost to 11th seed Karolína Muchová. Seeded 16th at the US Open, she overcame qualifier Zhang Shuai, before losing to Ann Li in the second round.

In September at the China Open, Bencic received a bye as the 15th seed and then defeated Katie Volynets and qualifier Priscilla Hon to set up a fourth round meeting with second seed Coco Gauff which she lost in three sets. A win over Donna Vekić followed by a walkover against Elise Mertens, saw her reach the third round at the Wuhan Open, at which point she lost to second seed Iga Świątek.

Seeded sixth at the Ningbo Open, Bencic defeated Magda Linette and qualifier Yuliia Starodubtseva to make it into the quarterfinals, where she lost to second seed Jasmine Paolini. The following week at the Pan Pacific Open, she received a bye due to being seeded fifth and then overcame qualifier Varvara Gracheva, eighth seed Karolína Muchová and Sofia Kenin to reach the final, which she won in straight sets against sixth seed Linda Nosková to claim her 10th WTA singles title. As a result, she moved up to world No. 11 in the WTA rankings on 27 October 2025. As top seed at the Hong Kong Open, Bencic recorded wins over Aliaksandra Sasnovich and Wang Yafan to reach the quarterfinals, before withdrawing from the tournament due to a thigh injury.

=== 2026: Return to top 10, US Open mixed doubles final ===
Bencic started her 2026 season representing Switzerland at the United Cup. She won her first eight matches in singles and mixed doubles to lead Switzerland to the final. In her singles matches, she defeated Léolia Jeanjean and Jasmine Paolini in the group stage, Solana Sierra in the quarterfinals, and Elise Mertens in the semifinals. In the final against Poland, she defeated world No. 2, Iga Świątek, but (partnering Jakub Paul) lost the deciding mixed doubles match to Katarzyna Kawa and Jan Zieliński. While Switzerland lost the final, she was named Most Valuable Player of the tournament for her 9-1 record. After the tournament, she returned to the WTA top 10 for the first since her maternity leave, becoming the first mother to enter do so since 2019. Seeded 10th at the Australian Open, Bencic lost to world No. 126 Nikola Bartůňková in the second round.

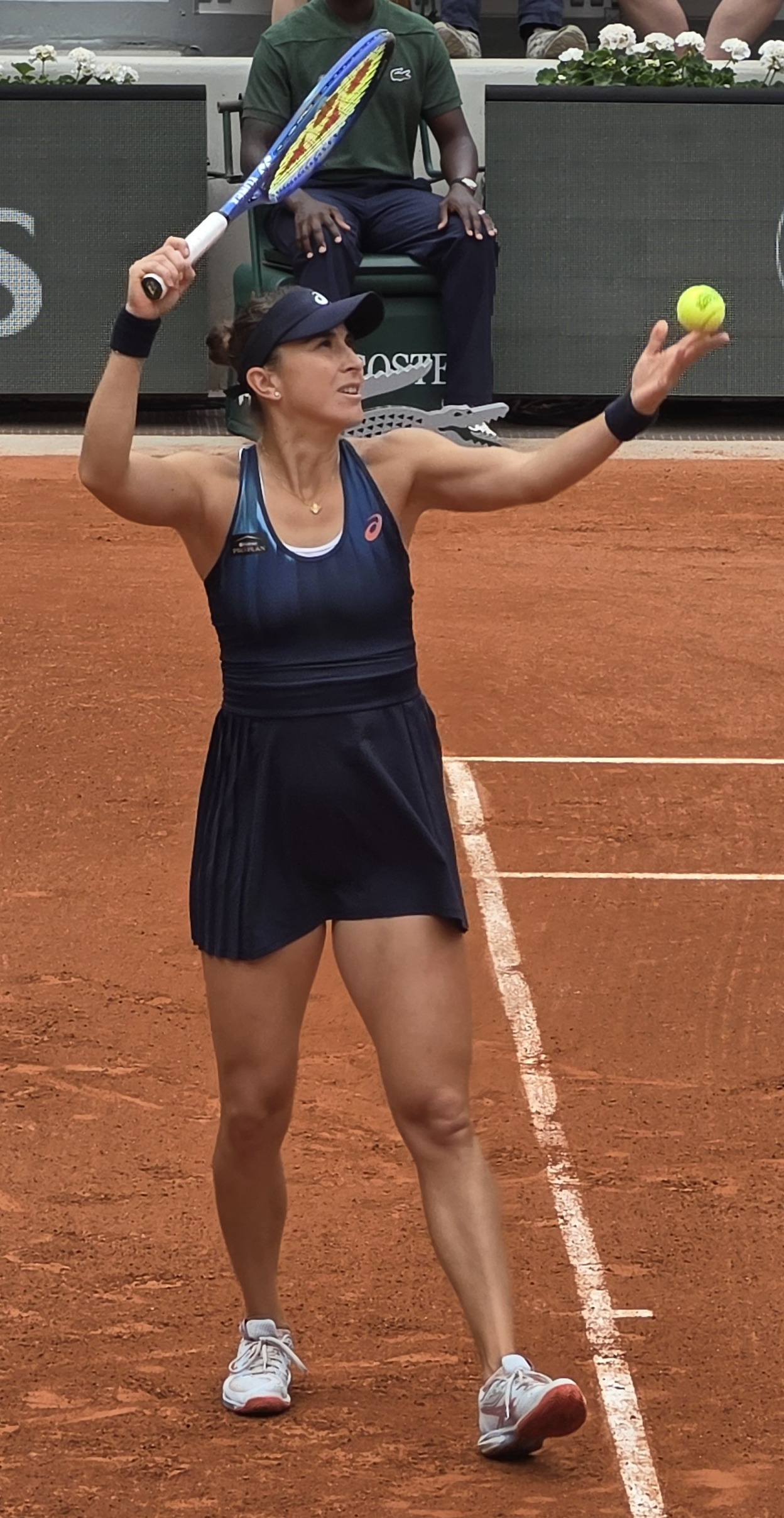
Bencic at the 2026 French Open

In March, she teamed up with Flavio Cobolli to win the invitational mixed doubles at the Indian Wells Open, defeating top seeds Gabriela Dabrowski and Lloyd Glasspool in the final. Bencic reached back-to-back quarterfinals at the Miami Open, where she overcame sixth seed Amanda Anisimova before losing to fourth seed Coco Gauff, and at the Charleston Open, where it was fifth seed Madison Keys who ended her run.

At the French Open, Bencic was eliminated in the fourth round by seventh seed Elina Svitolina in three sets. She also suffered a fourth round exit at Wimbledon, losing to seventh seed Coco Gauff, again in three sets.

Moving onto the North American hard court swing of the year, Bencic made it through to the quarterfinals at the Canadian Open, but then withdrew from the tournament due to a hip injury. Four days later she retired after losing the opening set of her second round match against wildcard entrant Loïs Boisson at the Cincinnati Open. At the US Open, Bencic partnered with Flavio Cobolli to reach the mixed doubles final, losing to Karolína Muchová and Jakub Menšík. Seeded 12th in the singles, she lost to Yulia Putintseva in the first round. During the second set of the match, Bencic reacted to dropping a service game by hitting a ball into the crowd that struck a spectator leading her opponent to call for her to be disqualified, a request that was turned down with the umpire issuing a code violation instead.

Bencic was eliminated in the round of 32 at both the final two WTA 1000 tournaments of the year, losing to 21st seed Ann Li at the China Open and Sonay Kartal at the Wuhan Open. Seeded fifth at the Ningbo Open, she was defeated in the second round by qualifier Katarzyna Kawa. On 26 October, Bencic announced she was ending her season early due to a foot injury and had subsequently withdrawn from the Pan Pacific Open, where she was reigning champion, and the Hong Kong Open.

== National representation ==
=== Fed Cup ===
Bencic made her debut for the Switzerland Fed Cup team in 2012 at the age of 14. That year, she played in two doubles dead rubbers with Amra Sadiković, losing to the Australian pair of Casey Dellacqua and Jelena Dokić and defeating the Belarusian pair of Aliaksandra Sasnovich and Darya Lebesheva. She played in her first live rubbers in 2014 when Switzerland were World Group II. Although Bencic won both of her singles matches against France over Alizé Cornet and Virginie Razzano, her compatriots Timea Bacsinszky and Stefanie Vögele lost their matches to set up a decisive doubles rubber. Bencic and Bacsinszky lost the match and the tie to Cornet and Kristina Mladenovic. In the World Group II play-off round two months later, Bencic and Bacsinszky led Switzerland to a 4–1 win over Brazil, with Bencic winning one of her two singles matches. The following year, the duo swept their first three singles matches against Sweden to advance to the World Group play-offs. Although Bencic missed the play-off due to injury, Switzerland defeated Poland to return to the top-tier World Group the following year.

In the World Group, Switzerland made it to the semifinals in both 2016 and 2017. Bencic led the team to their 2016 first round over Germany, winning both of her singles matches against Andrea Petkovic and Angelique Kerber as well as the decisive doubles rubber with Martina Hingis. She was injured for the next tie, a loss to the Czech Republic. The following year, Bencic split her two singles matches as Switzerland advanced 4–1 past France. She was named to the team for the semifinal round against Belarus, but did not play in any of the live rubbers as she was dealing with a wrist injury at the time. In 2018, Switzerland were again eliminated by the Czech Republic, this time in the first round as Bencic lost both of her singles matches. She was unavailable for the play-off round due to injury, which Switzerland lost to Romania to fall out of the World Group. The next year, Bencic led her team to a victory over Italy in World Group II with two singles wins. However, she was unavailable as Switzerland lost their play-off tie to the United States to keep them in World Group II.

In 2022, team Switzerland won the Billie Jean King Cup for the first time in history. Bencic was among three other nominated players – Teichmann, Golubic and Waltert. On their way to the play-off, they beat Canada and Italy in Group A with losing an only match to Canada. In the semifinal, the Swiss team won against Czech Republic by winning both singles matches and advanced to the final. Once again, it was enough to win both singles matches against Australia and so they became the 2022 champions.

=== Hopman Cup ===
Bencic has competed at the Hopman Cup in January with Roger Federer for three consecutive years from 2017 through 2019. After finishing in second place in their round robin group to the eventual champions France in 2017, the pair won the tournament in each of the next two years. In 2018, they won all nine of their round robin rubbers to set up a final against the German team of Angelique Kerber and Alexander Zverev. After Federer defeated Zverev and Bencic lost to Kerber, the Swiss team won the decisive mixed doubles rubber in straight sets for the title. During the 2019 event, they were upset by the Greek team of Maria Sakkari and Stefanos Tsitsipas in their last round robin tie, but still advanced to the final through the tiebreak criteria. In a rematch of the previous year's final, Federer again beat Zverev while Kerber again defeated Bencic. The mixed doubles rubber was much closer than in 2018 and came down to a winner-take-all point in the third-set tiebreak as part of the Fast4 format. Federer served the point, which Switzerland won in a long rally to win their second consecutive Hopman Cup.

=== Olympics ===
In 2021, Bencic represented her country in her first Olympic Games at Tokyo, after having to skip Rio 2016 due to injury. Seeded no. 9, she won the Women's Singles gold medal, defeating the Czech Republic's Markéta Vondroušová in the final, 7–5, 2–6, 6–3. She also advanced to the doubles final alongside Viktorija Golubic, winning the Olympic silver medal. By doing so, Bencic became only the fifth player to reach two finals at the same Olympic event since tennis returned at the Games in 1988, joining Serena and Venus Williams, Andy Murray and Nicolás Massú.

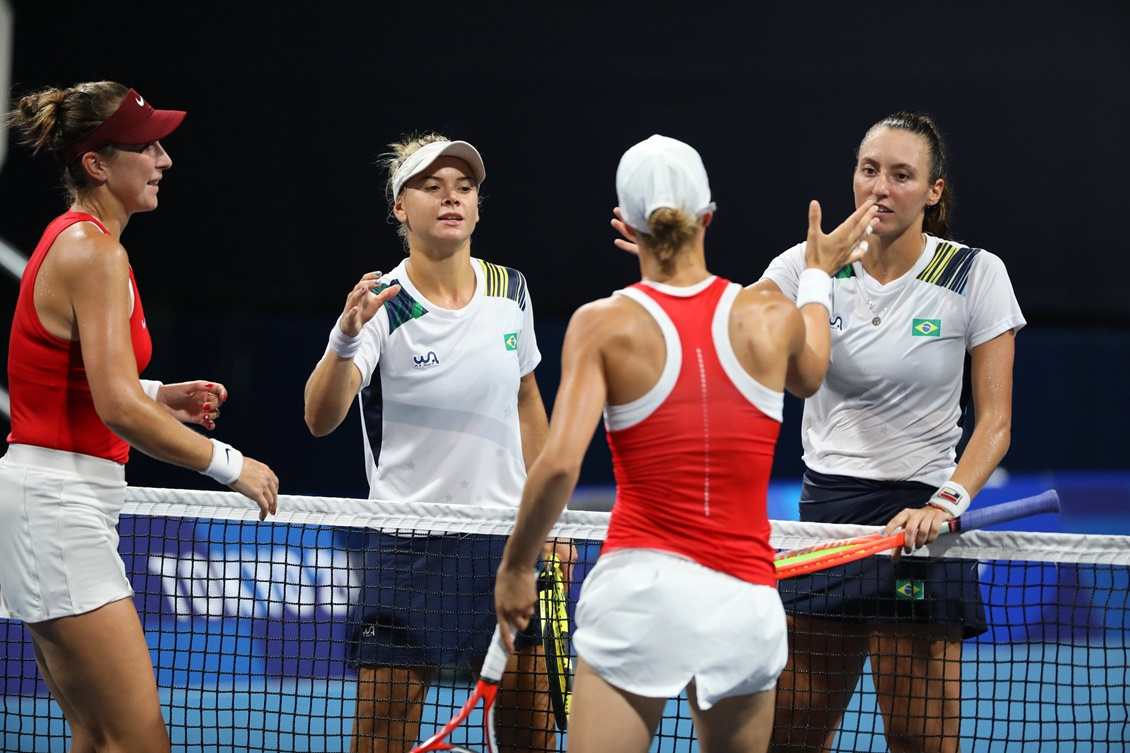
Bencic with Viktorija Golubic at the semifinal against Brazilians Laura Pigossi and Luisa Stefani at the 2020 Summer Olympics

== Playing style ==
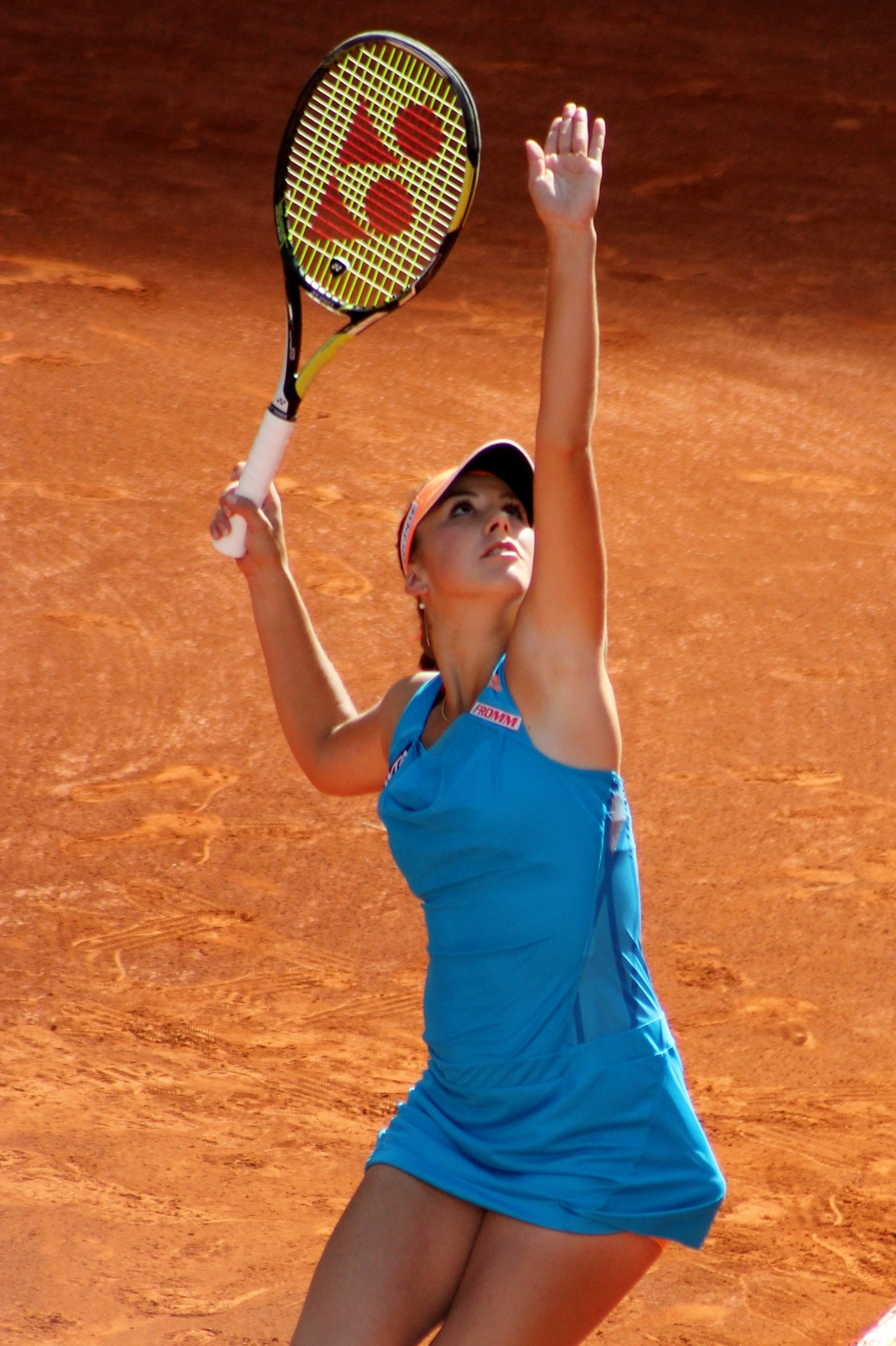
Bencic serving

Bencic has an all-court game, and possesses an aggressive playing style. She is regularly compared to former world No. 1 Martina Hingis, as both players are Swiss, of Slovak descent, and have been coached by Hingis's mother. Hingis has compared herself with Bencic, saying, "The technique, my mom puts a lot of attention to that. So the game, I mean, [Bencic has] got a great backhand as well. But also she's stronger, so she can work with other weapons than I had. I mean, maybe I was more maybe a little better mover, but when she hits a shot it can be a winner. Like she's hitting a lot more winners than did I. So it's different a little bit." Tennis coach Günter Bresnik has called her an "unbelievably smart player" and noted that, "She understands the game really well and knows exactly how to throw the other player off." Bencic possesses a powerful first serve, peaking at 113 mph (182 km/h), allowing her to serve aces and dictate play from the first stroke of a point. Despite this, Bencic's second serve is a considerable weakness, and is heavily affected by nerves, meaning that she typically serves a large number of double faults. Bencic possesses the ability to hit powerful groundstroke winners, but she can also hit lob and drop shot winners when presented with the opportunity. When playing with Roger Federer at the Hopman Cup, he praised her prowess at returning serve. Bencic excels at hitting the ball early or on the rise, and is capable of turning defense into offense, excelling at redirecting cross-court shots down the line. Bencic is an accomplished opponent on all surfaces, although she has stated that her favourite surface is grass.

== Coaches ==
As a junior, Bencic was coached by her father and Melanie Molitor, the mother of Martina Hingis. Molitor coached Bencic daily from 2004 to 2012, at which point her father Ivan again became her primary coach. In late 2017, she hired Iain Hughes during her recovery from wrist surgery. Vladimír Pláteník worked with Bencic in 2018 from Wimbledon in July until mid-October, at which point her father returned as her main coach. In their first tournament back together, Bencic reached the final at the Luxembourg Open. Bencic was coached by Russian tennis player Dmitry Tursunov until April 2023.

== Endorsements ==
Bencic has been endorsed by Yonex for racquets since turning professional, and was endorsed by Adidas for clothing and footwear from 2011. In 2015, Bencic signed a 'top-to-toe' endorsement deal with Yonex, being supplied with clothing and footwear by the company, along with her racquets. In 2018, upon her return to professional tennis after a long injury layoff, Bencic became endorsed by Nike for clothing and footwear. In 2023, Bencic switched to Asics for clothing and footwear. Bencic has used the Yonex EZONE 100 racquet throughout her professional career. In July 2022, Bencic became a brand ambassador and honorary Chief Inspiration Officer for the Swiss digital private bank, Alpian.

== Personal life ==
Bencic has a younger brother Brian, who is also a tennis player. They both trained at Molitor's academy and was ranked as a top 200 junior in the world. She has both Swiss and Slovak citizenship.

In 2018, she began dating fitness trainer and former Inter Bratislava footballer Martin Hromkovič from Slovakia. They married in St. Gallen in April 2024, and their daughter Bella was born that same month. They live in Wollerau, Switzerland. She kept her surname Bencic on the circuit, (Note: In Billie Jean King Cup, she began to be listed under the surname Hromkovicova from 2024.) but in private life she adopted her married surname Hromkovicova (Slovak: Hromkovičová).

== Career statistics ==
=== Grand Slam performance timelines ===
Key
W	F	SF	QF	#R	RR	Q#	DNQ	A	NH

(W) winner; (F) finalist; (SF) semifinalist; (QF) quarterfinalist; (#R) rounds 4, 3, 2, 1; (RR) round-robin stage; (Q#) qualification round; (DNQ) did not qualify; (A) absent; (NH) not held; (SR) strike rate (events won / competed); (W–L) win–loss record.
To avoid confusion and double counting, these charts are updated at the conclusion of a tournament or when the player's participation has ended.

==== Singles ====
Current through the 2026 US Open.

Tournament	2014	2015	2016	2017	2018	2019	2020	2021	2022	2023	2024	2025	2026	SR	W–L	Win %
Australian Open	2R	1R	4R	1R	2R	3R	3R	3R	2R	4R	A	4R	2R	0 / 12	19–12	61%
French Open	1R	2R	A	A	2R	3R	A	2R	3R	1R	A	A	4R	0 / 8	10–8	56%
Wimbledon	3R	4R	2R	A	4R	3R	NH	1R	1R	4R	A	SF	4R	0 / 10	22–10	69%
US Open	QF	3R	3R	A	1R	SF	A	QF	3R	4R	A	2R	1R	0 / 10	22–10	69%
Win–loss	7–4	6–4	6–3	0–1	5–4	10–4	2–1	7–4	5–4	9–4	0–0	9–3	7–3	0 / 40	73–40	65%
Career statistics
Titles	0	2	0	0	0	2	0	1	1	2	0	2	0	Career total: 10		
Finals	1	4	1	0	1	3	0	3	2	3	0	2	0	Career total: 20		
Year-end ranking	33	14	42	74	37	8	12	23	12	17	913	11		$15,643,039		

==== Doubles ====
Tournament	2014	2015	2016	2017	2018	2019	2020	2021	2022	2023	SR	W–L	Win %
Australian Open	A	1R	2R	1R	A	1R	A	1R	A	2R	0 / 6	2–5	29%
French Open	A	3R	A	A	1R	2R	A	A	1R	A	0 / 4	3–4	43%
Wimbledon	2R	2R	A	A	1R	1R	NH	1R	2R	A	0 / 6	3–6	33%
US Open	1R	1R	1R	A	1R	A	A	A	A	A	0 / 4	0–4	0%
Win–loss	1–2	3–4	1–1	0–1	0–3	1–3	0–0	0–2	1–2	1–1	0 / 20	8–19	30%
Career statistics
Titles	0	2	0	0	0	0	0	0	0	0	Career total: 2		
Finals	0	2	0	0	0	0	0	1	0	0	Career total: 3		
Year-end ranking	208	68	215	269	242	116	104	154	133	197			

=== Olympic medal matches ===
==== Singles: 1 (gold medal) ====
Result	Year	Tournament	Surface	Opponent	Score
Gold	2021	Tokyo Summer Olympics	Hard	(Czech Republic) Markéta Vondroušová	7–5, 2–6, 6–3

==== Doubles: 1 (silver medal) ====
Result	Year	Tournament	Surface	Partner	Opponents	Score
Silver	2021	Tokyo Summer Olympics	Hard	(Switzerland) Viktorija Golubic	(Czech Republic) Barbora Krejčíková (Czech Republic) Kateřina Siniaková	5–7, 1–6

== Notes ==
Awards
Preceded by (United States) Taylor Townsend	ITF Junior World Champion; 2013	Succeeded by (United States) CiCi Bellis
Preceded by (Canada) Eugenie Bouchard	WTA Newcomer of the Year; 2014	Succeeded by (Australia) Daria Gavrilova
