= Snapp! =

Iranian transportation network company

- Type: Private company
- Industry: Technology, transportation
- Founded: February 28, 2014; 12 years ago
- Founder: Iyad Elkaser; Mahmud Fauz
- Headquarters: Tehran, Iran
- Services: SnappEco; SnappBike; SnappBox; SnappFood; SnappRoom; SnappTrip; SnappMarket
- Number of employees: 3,500
- Parent: Snapp Group
- Website: snapp.ir

Snapp! (Persian: اسنپ!) is an Iranian vehicle for hire company, headquartered in Tehran that launched in February 2014. Users can request a ride via the iOS, Android, or web application, by indicating their location and destination. The price of the trip is set beforehand, to eliminate bargaining. Snapp! commissions drivers upon completing a background check, and showing a valid driver's license and insurance before hiring them.

== Funding and operations ==
The company launched in 2014 as Taxi Yaab and experienced rapid growth in the first three years.

In October 2016, the company received a $20 million investment in a Series A round led by MTN Group, a South African multinational corporation. According to a 2017 interview with Shahram Shahkar, the former CEO of the company, Snapp! employs more than 300,000 active drivers and more than 500 other personnel at that time. Snapp rebranded itself and changed its logo in 2019.

As of 2019, Snapp! in Tehran was larger than Uber in any city. As of December 2020, Snapp! had 85% of Iran's market share with operations in 34 cities. Via its 3 million drivers, it provided 2.5 million rides per day and is credited with a major shift in how Iranians use taxis.

=== Products ===
In order to evade sanctions and appear on the app store, Snapp! had to disguise itself as a music app. Similar to other companies such as Uber, Lyft, Snapp! features other options including: Snapp Taxi, Snapp Bike (for motorcycles), Snapp Box (for parcels) and Snapp Club (a loyalty program).

== Subsidiaries ==
Initially, Iran Internet Group was supposedly the holding company behind Snapp!. IIG also held other companies such as Bamilo and ZoodFood. Later on, it renamed or shut down some of these services in favor of expanding Snapp! from a transportation-focused company to a more general tech company. Because of this, the ZoodFood service was renamed to Snapp! Food and the online retail store known as Bamilo was shut down and redirected to the Snapp! Market website.

== Controversies ==
=== Tapsi’s complaint against Snap at the Competition Council ===
The Competition Council announced a case between two ride-hailing companies, ruling in favor of Tapsi and penalizing Snap.

In an interview with ISNA, Sepehr Dadjoui-Tavakoli, the Council's public relations manager, referenced the 555th session of the Competition Council, stating that Snap had been penalized for anti-competitive behavior following a complaint from Tapsi. According to Tapsi's complaint, Snap had purchased 1,000 SIM cards to create accounts as passengers on Tapsi's platform, gaining access to contact information for about 14,000 Tapsi drivers. Under Article 61 of the General Policies of Principle 44, this action was deemed anti-competitive, and Snap was fined.

He further explained that Snap allegedly purchased these SIM cards, accessed Tapsi’s platform as passengers, obtained driver contact information, and subsequently offered higher wages to persuade Tapsi drivers to switch platforms. Since many drivers accepted Snap’s offer, Tapsi incurred financial losses, and Snap was fined for engaging in anti-competitive practices.

In response, Snap denied the allegations regarding the recruitment of rival company drivers, issuing a statement contesting the Competition Council’s ruling.

== Ridehailing ==
In May 2024 carpooling was added to the app.

== Snapfood hack and user data breach ==
In January 2024, a hacker group announced that it had accessed the personal information of over twenty million users of Snapfood, an online food ordering platform. This data included usernames, passwords, email addresses, full names, mobile numbers, and birth dates. Additionally, over 51 million user location details, including coordinates, addresses, and landline numbers, were also part of the breached database. Other compromised data included details of 360 million orders and information on 35,000 couriers. The hacker group listed this stolen data for sale at a price of $30,000.

On January 1, 2024, Snapfood confirmed the breach in a public statement and acknowledged responsibility. The company also announced that it would enter negotiations with the hackers to prevent the release of user data.

== See also ==
- Technology start-ups in Iran
- Transport in Iran
- AloPeyk
