= Bamilo =

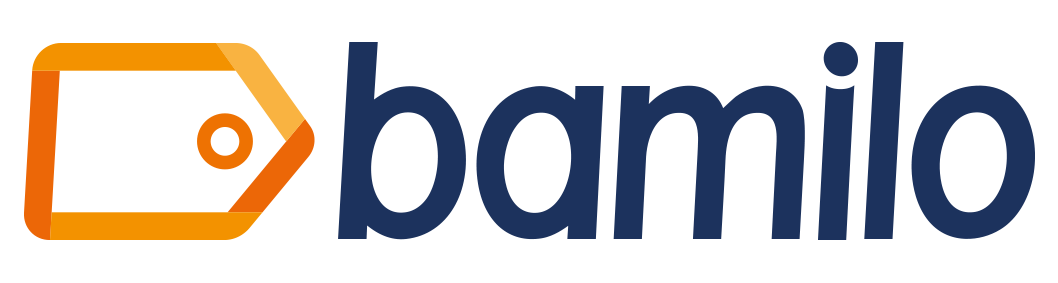
- Type: Private
- Industry: Ecommerce, Technology
- Founder: Ramtin Monazahian
- Defunct: 20 March 2019; 7 years ago
- Website: www.bamilo.com

Bamilo was an E-commerce marketplace start-up in Iran

It was founded by Ramtin Monazahian, a German-Iranian with degrees in business and economics and previous work experience in consulting and investment banking companies.

Bamilo was the first and largest venture of the Iran Internet Group (IIG), backed by MTN Group. Other IIG ventures include Snapp, Snappfood, Snapptrip, and Zoodroom.

Bamilo localized Black Friday as "Harajome", and set up the country's largest online shopping campaign, challenging the monopoly that was prevalent before its market entry.

== See also ==
- Technology start-ups in Iran
