= Swiss Iranian Investment Forum =

Swiss nonprofit association

Swiss Iranian Investment Forum (SIIF)
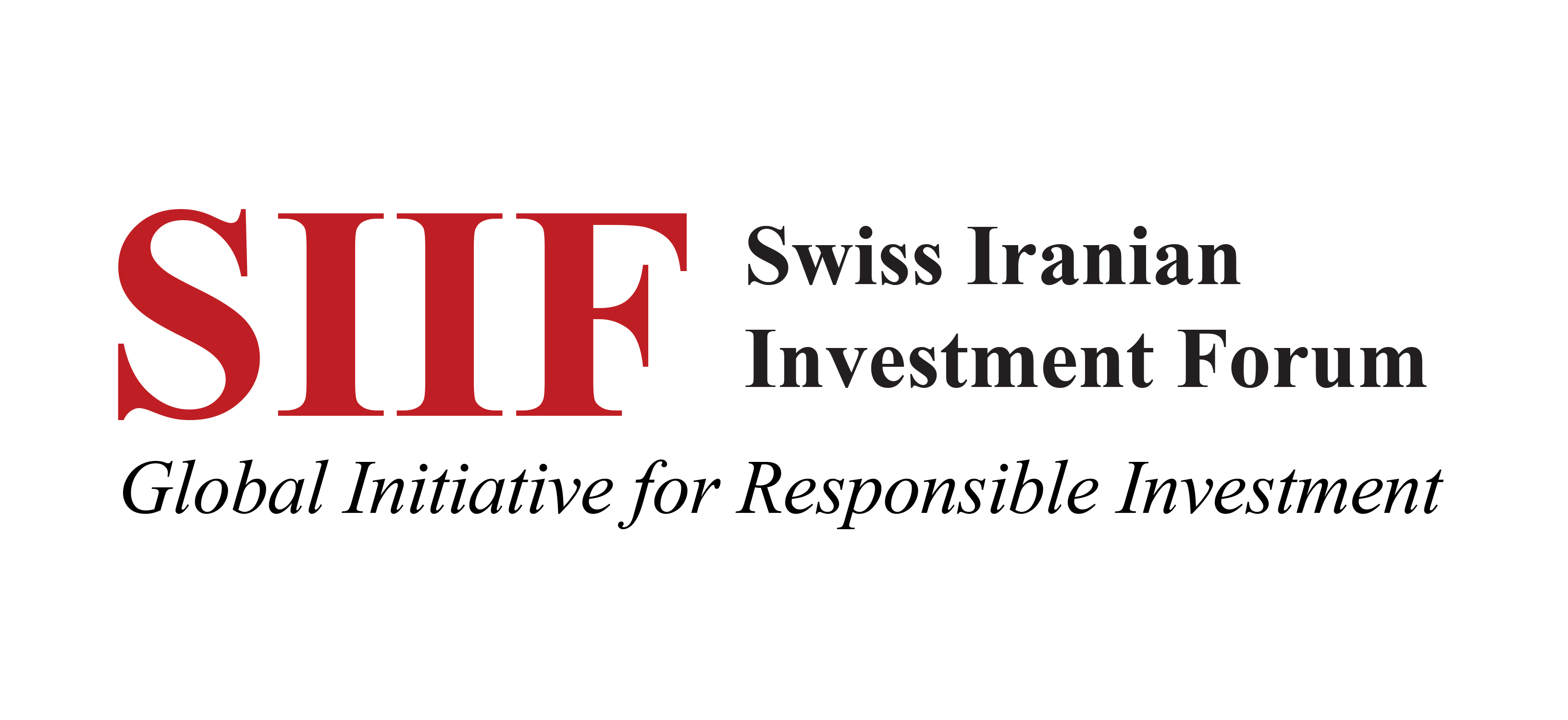
- Formation: 3 August 2017; 9 years ago
- Founder: Ali Javadi Pouya, James Miller, Peter Gollnow
- Type: Nonprofit organization
- Legal status: Registered Association
- Headquarters: Geneva, Switzerland
- Region served: Worldwide
- Official language: English
- Executive President: Ali Javadi Pouya

The Swiss-Iranian Investment Forum (SIIF) is a Swiss nonprofit association, based in Geneva, Switzerland. Established as an international body, its mission is cited as "Global Initiative for responsible Investment” for promoting sustainable and responsible investment in Iran’s health, transportation, environmental, financial and other related and necessary sectors based on global finding about economic, social and environmental situation in Iran.

== History ==
The Swiss-Iranian Investment Forum (SIIF) was founded in 2017 as a Civil law association domiciled in Geneva, Switzerland. The purpose of SIIF is to facilitate economic exchanges between Switzerland and Iran, and promote better understanding of Iran's emerging markets and financial reforms designed to protect international investments and business activities.

SIIF is mindful that past and present mutually respectful diplomatic and commercial relations between the two countries provide a firm foundation upon which to build, and further strengthen the future potential of this positive, bi-lateral relationship. SIIF's sustainable development and responsible investment market priorities include Iran's health, transportation, and environmental sectors based on the road map defined between president Schneider-Ammann and president Rouhani in the official visit of Swiss delegates to Tehran in 2017.

SIIF plans include hosting a series of high-level conferences and seminars in Switzerland to provide guidance, comprehensive evaluation, analysis, and discussion of the global economic agenda. SIIF events will bring together global business leaders, experts, the media, and government officials to create favorable conditions for constructive dialogue, promotion of new ideas, and the creation of new, economically sustainable projects that support development of innovative social enterprises.

== Organization ==
Headquartered in Geneva, the forum also has offices in Tehran. Swiss-Iranian Investment Forum strives to be impartial and is not tied to any political or partisan interests. The association is "committed to recognize the global importance of the United Nations Sustainable Development Goals (SDGs) - a global agenda to end poverty in 2030 - and the unique role and impact investing plays in achieving SDGs goals and building for a sustainable future through promote sustainable and responsible investment in Iran's health, transportation, environmental, financial and other necessary sectors based on global findings about the economic, social, and environmental issues.

== Activities ==
SIIF main activity is to establish bi-lateral business relationships with Switzerland to develop and implement projects supported by those investments, by means of:

- A. Co-hosting informational conferences, seminars, and special events in Switzerland in collaboration with other Swiss associations and chambers of commerce committed to similar objectives; the conferences will feature expert speakers to address key themes of interest, and provide opportunities for discussion and networking by participants.
- B. Seeking assistance from, and collaborating with Swiss government, business, and financial regulatory institutions to improve Iran's knowledge base and to build capacity in the areas of investment banking, credit rating agencies, financial transparency, corporate social responsibility, and sustainable development strategies.
- C. Developing collaborative projects with Swiss, Iranian, and international commercial and non-profit organizations (NGOs) to take advantage of existing and emerging new markets and investment opportunities.
- D. medical training programs in Switzerland for Iranian physicians

== Membership ==
The association is funded by its member companies, typically international enterprises, varying by industry and region. Membership is stratified by the level of engagement with forum activities, with the level of membership fees increasing as participation in meetings, projects, and initiatives rises. Types of Membership:

- Individual Member
- Associate Member
- Honorary Member
- International Affiliate

== See also ==
- Economy of Iran
- World Economic Forum
- EU-Iran Forum
- Sustainable Development
- World Knowledge Forum
