= EU-Iran Forum =

Europe-Iran Forum was a series of events originally hosted by the Development Institute Paris, BHB Emissary and European Voice magazine in 2014. The event's main goal is to act as a non-partisan meeting ground for European and Iranian businesses to discuss future cooperation post sanctions.

Following the historic Joint Action Plan agreement reached by Iran and the Group P5+1 in November 2013, a series of economic sanctions were lifted, rekindling commercial interest in Iran throughout Europe.

The event, a first of its kind to offer Iran as a potential investment destination garnered attention in the press including the BBC. The Europe-Iran forum is the first event created by the private sector to have the moral support from the government of President Hassan Rouhani

Scheduled speakers included Martin Sorrell, chief executive of advertising group WPP, as well as Jack Straw and Hubert Vedrine, former British and French foreign ministers respectively. The Forum also has the blessing of Rouhani, whose chief of staff has written a letter of support to the organizers, media company European Voice.

The first post-sanctions conference was held in Vienna, Austria and second event has been slated for fall 2015 in the Swiss city of Geneva. The event's stated goal is to provide a platform for both Iranian and international banking and finance groups to discuss future cooperation post-sanctions.

The second forum was dubbed the Europe-Iran Forum, considering it was being held in the Swiss city of Geneva, and not in a European Union country.

== Notable speakers ==
- Jack Straw, former Labour Party British Foreign Secretary
- Sir Martin Sorrell, CEO of advertising agency WPP plc
- Rouzbeh Pirouz, founder of the Iranian Business School and Turquoise Partners
- Neda Amidi, associate of the Plug & Play Tech Center in California
- Parviz Aghili, CEO of Middle East Bank
- Dominique de Villepin, former French foreign minister

== Criticism ==
The event has come under heavy pressure from supporters of Israel for its pro-Iran stance. Israeli newspapers in 2014 slammed the event calling it a "travesty of the gravest proportions".

== See also ==
- Ravand Institute
- Economy of Iran
- Banking and Insurance in Iran
- Tehran Stock Exchange
- Tourism in Iran
- Petroleum industry in Iran
- Foreign direct investment in Iran
