= Turquoise Partners =

گروه مالی فیروزه Turquoise Partners
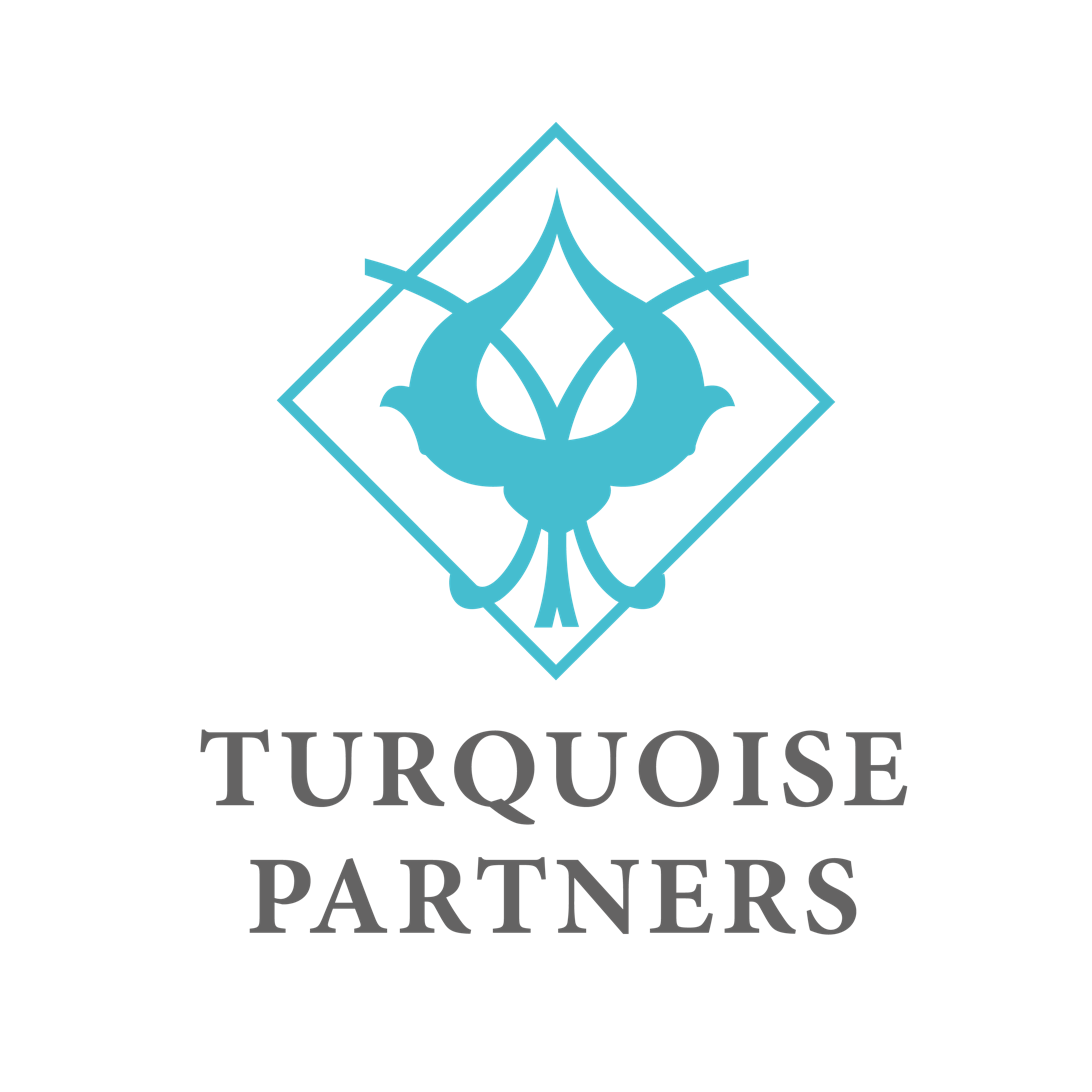
- Type: Private
- Industry: Financial services
- Founded: 2005
- Headquarters: Tehran, Iran
- Area served: International
- Key people: Ramin Rabii (CEO)
- Products: Asset Management; Private Equity; Brokerage Services; Corporate Finance
- Total assets: ▲$200 Million (2014)
- Website: TurquoisePartners.com

Turquoise Partners (Persian: گروه مالی فیروزه) is a privately owned international financial services group based in Iran which was established in 2005. Turquoise provides a range of financial services to foreign and domestic clients. Turquoise was in 2014 the largest manager of foreign portfolio investment on Iran's capital markets.

== Firouzeh Asia Brokerage ==
Turquoise is a majority shareholder of a fully licensed Iranian brokerage firm, Firouzeh Asia. This joint venture between Turquoise and Iran's largest private sector insurance company, Asia Insurance. Firouzeh Asia offers online and offline trading platforms to its local and foreign clients. It also produces reports and analyses on the Iranian capital markets, sectors, and listed companies in English and Persian.

== Tose’ Firouzeh Asset Management ==
Turquoise has a local regulated asset management company, Tose’ Firouzeh Asset Management. Through this firm, Turquoise manages tailored managed accounts for its local and international clients.

== Partnerships ==
In 2015, Charlemagne Capital in London (U.K.) and Turquoise Partners announced their partnership. Charlemagne has $2.5 billion assets under management. Together, they have set up funds in different sectors such as oil and gas, banks and retail in Iran worth $50 million.

In 2016, Turquoise announced that it will partner with Swiss bank REYL & Cie in Dubai in a $200 million Venture Capital fund focused primarily on consumer goods.

== See also ==
- Venture capital in Iran
- Iranian Oil Bourse
- National Development Fund
