= Iranian Business School =

International business school located in Tehran, Iran

- مؤسسه آموزش عالی ایرانیان (Persian); Iranian Business School (English)
- Motto: World class education, local value creation
- Type: Private, Business school
- Established: 2010
- Affiliations: Aalto University
- Chancellor: Ali Naghi Mashayekhi
- Students: 1,000
- Location: Tehran, Iran
- Campus: Urban
- Website: Iranian Business School

The Iranian Business School (IBS) (Persian: مؤسسه آموزش عالی ایرانیان, Musish-e Âmvâzesh-e 'ali-ye Iranian) is an international business school located in Tehran, Iran. The Iranian Business School (IBS) is a not-for-profit post-graduate School accredited by The Ministry of Science, Research and Technology of Iran and works in partnership management education institutions in the world to offer business and management studies in Iran.

== History ==
The Iranian Business School was conceived of in 2007 by a group of philanthropists from the business community of the Iranian diaspora and supported by private sector figures within Iran. IBS introduce the Aalto EMBA in cooperation with Aalto University, Finland in January 2014.

== See also ==
- Higher education in Iran
- Education in Iran
