= Alpian =

Swiss digital private bank

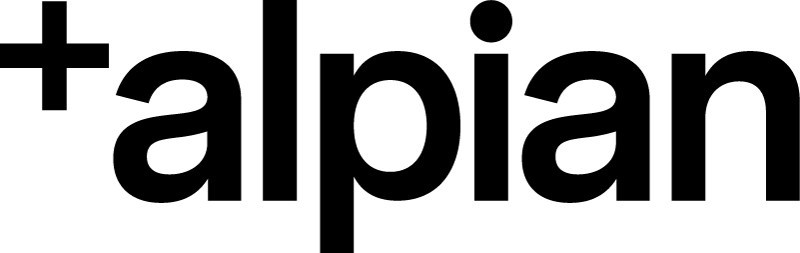
- Company type: Société anonyme (SA)
- Industry: Financial services
- Founded: October 2019; 6 years ago
- Headquarters: Geneva, Switzerland
- Area served: Switzerland
- Brands: Alpian, i-vest.ch
- Number of employees: 120 (2025)
- Parent: Banca Fideuram
- Website: www.alpian.com

Alpian SA (commercially known as Alpian) is a Swiss digital bank headquartered in Geneva. The institution operates under a banking licence issued by the Swiss Financial Market Supervisory Authority (FINMA).

Alpian has been described in financial media as one of Switzerland’s first fully cloud-based banks.

== History ==
Alpian was founded in October 2019 as part of an incubation initiative by the Geneva-based wealth-management firm REYL & Cie.

In April 2022, it became the first Swiss digital bank to receive a full banking licence from FINMA. Additionally, the newspaper Le Temps reported that Alpian “devient première banque privée numérique suisse”.

The bank launched publicly in October 2022.

Between 2020 and 2024, Alpian completed several funding rounds to support its digital-banking operations and expansion:

- Series A (May 2020): CHF 12.2 million.
- Series B (April 2021): CHF 16.9 million.
- Series C (May 2024): CHF 76 million, led by Fideuram – Intesa Sanpaolo.

== Ownership and corporate structure ==
Alpian was initially incubated within REYL & CIe', before becoming an independent company. In 2024, the Italian banking group Intesa Sanpaolo, through its subsidiary Fideuram - Intesa Sanpaolo, became the majority shareholder of Alpian.

== Technology ==
It relies on Google Cloud Platform infrastructure and artificial-intelligence tools to support digital onboarding, compliance, and advisory processes.

== Reception and media coverage ==
Swiss and international media have highlighted Alpian as a pioneer in bridging the gap between traditional private banking and neobanking. Le Temps reported its status as “première banque privée numérique suisse.” Swissinfo described it as “digital but not robotic,” while Handelszeitung noted its shift toward smaller wealth clients. The funding round led by Intesa Sanpaolo received attention from Fintech Futures and Reuters, underlining Alpian’s growing position within the Swiss fintech sector.

== See also ==
- Neobank
- Banking in Switzerland
- Intesa Sanpaolo
