= REYL & Cie =

Swiss private bank

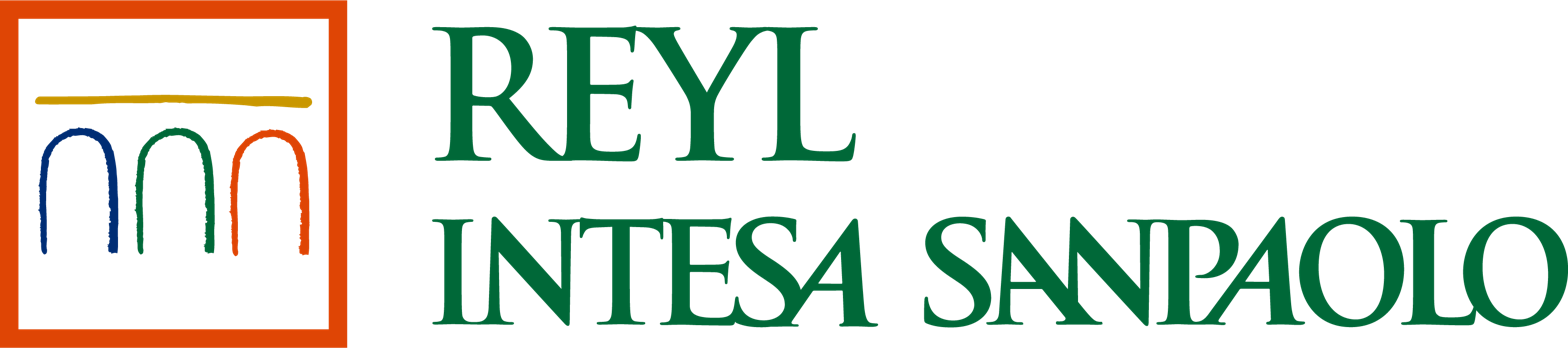
- Type: Société anonyme (SA)
- Industry: Private banking, financial services
- Founded: 1973; 53 years ago
- Founders: Dominique Reyl
- Headquarters: Geneva, Switzerland
- Number of locations: 9
- Area served: worldwide
- Services: Wealth Management, Corporate & Family Governance, Corporate Advisory & Structuring, Asset Services, Asset management
- Total assets: CHF 25 billion
- Owner: Intesa Sanpaolo (100%)
- Number of employees: 245 (2017)
- Website: www.reyl.com

REYL Intesa Sanpaolo (REYL & Cie) is a Swiss wealth management company that specialises in wealth management, entrepreneur & family office services, corporate finance, asset services and asset management.

The company was founded in Geneva in 1973 by Dominique Reyl. In 2022, REYL & Cie increased its assets under management by 37% in the space of one year and reached 18.1 billion Swiss francs. Including minority interests, its overall assets jumped 52% to reach 38.7 billion francs.

The bank has been investigated for gaps in its anti-moneylaundering practices. The bank has courted clients associated with corruption and authoritarian regimes.

== History ==
Dominique Reyl founded the Compagnie Financière d'Etudes et de Gestion (CFEG), a portfolio management company in Geneva in 1973. In January 1988 CFEG's activities were transferred into REYL & Cie and in 1999, REYL & Cie was granted the authorised securities dealer status. François Reyl, son of Dominique, joined REYL in 2002.

In 2008, François Reyl was appointed chief executive officer and REYL moved its headquarters to upscale rue du Rhône, in Geneva. A year later, REYL opened an office in Luxemburg and an independent subsidiary in Singapore.

After having been granted a banking licence in 2010, REYL & Cie opened a first Swiss branch in Zurich and founding REYL Overseas Ltd., a licensed Registered Investment Advisor with the U.S. Securities and Exchange Commission. The affiliate opened its first branch in Dallas in 2016.

The fourth business line Corporate Finance, widening the scope of services provided, was launched in 2012, the same year as the opening of a second Swiss branch in Lugano.

In 2013, REYL established a UK presence with the incorporation of REYL & CO (UK) LLP. The same year, the Group's name was associated with the Cahuzac affair, involving former French Finance Minister Jérôme Cahuzac; charges were rapidly dropped in Switzerland in 2014, the Bank was sentenced to a fine in France in 2017.

In 2015 REYL expanded into its fifth business line, Asset Services, as part of its diversification strategy, obtained a fund custodian license in Malta and opened REYL Finance (MEA) Ltd, awarded with a commercial license from the Dubai Financial Services Authority.

In 2017, REYL made a minority investment in Aspiration, an online banking platform based in Los Angeles. The same year REYL was awarded Outstanding Boutique Private Bank in Switzerland.

In 2020, Alpian, a digital bank incubated by the REYL Group, was launched to offer comprehensive and premium digital banking services.

In addition, in the context of this partnership, REYL also integrated Banque Morval, a Swiss establishment controlled by Intesa Sanpaolo since 2017.

In January 2022, REYL acquired a 40% stake in 1875 Finance, a Geneva-based multi-family office and independent asset manager with over CHF 13 billion of assets under management for private clients.

On 30 January 2026, Intesa Sanpaolo bought the remaining 24% of REYL's capital that it did not own, thus gaining complete control over the Swiss bank.

== Controversies ==
=== Offshore business ===
In connection with the "Cahuzac affair" involving the French finance minister Jérôme Cahuzac, a French court in December 2016 sentenced the bank to a fine of 1.875 million euros and the general manager François Reyl to a suspended prison sentence of one year and a fine of 375,000 euros. The court found that Bank Reyl had served as an "instrument for the concealment of assets" of former French Finance Minister Jérôme Cahuzac.

A full “confusion des peines” was granted as part of the CRPC homologated on 18 April 2023, which allows for the final consolidation of such procedures, two of which were in fact closed more than seven years before. Consequently, the residual amounts due by the Bank and its CEO in connection with this last legal chapter amounted to EUR 1,2m.

=== Weak anti-money laundering measures ===
In 2025, a OCCRP investigation revealed that REYL had courted numerous clients associated with corruption and authoritarian regimes, including Leonid Reiman, family members of Alexander Ponomarenko, family members of Nursultan Nazarbayev, family members of Ilham Aliyev, and family members of Islam Karimov.

In April 2025, the bank unsuccessfully sought to block media reports about the Swiss Financial Market Supervisory Authority's (FINMA) investigation through a Geneva court, citing banking secrecy. The court ruled that public interest justified the publication, reinforcing press freedom despite Switzerland’s strict bank secrecy laws.

== Management ==
The Bank operates under the direction of six partners : François Reyl, Pasha Bakhtiar, Nicolas Duchêne, Christian Fringhian and Lorenzo Rocco di Torrepadula. Their activity is overseen by a board of directors (2021) comprising Christian Merle (chairman), Michel Broch (vice-chairman), Yves Claude Aubert, Liane Elias Hoffman Ruth Metzler-Arnold Tommaso Corcos, Lino Mainolfi and Riccardo Barbarini.

== See also ==
- Banking in Switzerland
