= List of Iranian applications =

Applications based in Iran

Iranian applications are applications with different functionalities like banking, services, instant messaging, social media, games, shopping, VOD, app stores and ext. which their servers are located in Iran as well as those not hosted in the country.

== List ==
Category	Name	Notes	Type/Backed by
Browsers/Search	Zarebin	Browser/search engine	State-affiliated, Mobile Company of Iran
	My Gov (Iran Pass)	Government of Islamic Republic	State-affiliated, Ministry of ICT
Instant messaging & social media	Bale	Flagged by Google Play Protect as unsafe insecured,chat messages subject to state surveillance monitor	State-affiliated, Bank Melli of Iran
Instant messaging & social media	Eitaa		State-affiliated, Ministry of ICT
Instant messaging & social media	iGap		State-affiliated, Ministry of ICT
Instant messaging & social media	Rubika		State-affiliated, Ministry of ICT
Instant messaging & social media	Soroush Plus		State-affiliated, Ministry of ICT
Books and Education	Shaad		State-affiliated, Ministry of ICT
Books and Education	Maktabkhooneh		State-affiliated, MCI
Books and Education	Taaghche		State-affiliated, Hasin
Shopping	Digikala		State-affiliated, MCI
Shopping	Divar		State-affiliated,Tapsell
Shopping	Sheypoor		Sate-affiliated
Shopping	Okala		State-affiliated, Golrang
Shopping	National Credit Network		State-affiliated
Entertainment and Video (or On Demand)	Filimo		State-affiliated
Entertainment and Video (or On Demand)	Namava		State-affiliated
Entertainment and Video (or On Demand)	Aparat		State-affiliated
Entertainment and Video (or On Demand)	Telewebion		State-affiliated
Entertainment and Video (or On Demand)	Radiojavan		
Entertainment and Video (or On Demand)	FILMNET		State-affiliated, Golrang
App stores	Bazaar		State-affiliated,Tapsell
Transport	Snapp!		State-affiliated, Bonyad Islamic Revolution Mostazafan Foundation
Transport	Tapsi		State-affiliated, Golrang
Transport	Neshan		State-affiliated, Tapsell
Money	Asan Pardakht		State-affiliated,Bank Shahr
Money	Wepod		State-affiliated,Bank Pasargad
Money	Blu Bank		State-affiliated,Bank Saman
Money	Omid Bank		State-affiliated, Bank Sepah
News	Tebyan		State-affiliated
News	Fars News Agency		State-affiliated
Games	Quiz of Kings		
Games	Amirza		
MicroBlogging	Mihanblog	Deprecated	
MicroBlogging	Cloob	Defunct	
Miscellaneous	Baadesaba	Calendar/prayer app	
Miscellaneous	Shahriar	Government	State-affiliated
Games	See main article	Main article: List of video games developed in Iran	
News	INTL+	News channel	
Appstore	Paskoocheh		
VPN	BeePass VPN		
Maps	Gershad		
Connectivity	Toosheh		
Podcast	Shenoto		
News	Balatarin		
Delivery	Tipax express		
Maps	Balad map		State-affiliated

== See also ==
- 2026 Internet blackout in Iran
