= Cafe Bazaar =

Iranian digital software distribution company

- Native name: کافه بازار
- Type: Private
- Founded: 6 April 2011
- Founder: Hessam Armandehi, Reza Mohammadi
- Headquarters: Iran
- Key people: Manoochehr Sadri (CEO)
- Products: App store, mobile advertising
- Services: Online applications, digital advertising
- Total equity: €380 million
- Website: https://cafebazaar.ir/?l=en

Cafe Bazaar (Persian: کافه بازار) is an Iranian app store for the Android operating system, founded in April 2011 by Reza Mohammadi and Hessam Armandehi. Cafe Bazaar tailors its services specifically towards Persian-speaking users and offers more than 500,000 downloadable Iranian and international apps for gaming, social media, messaging and other uses.

In April 2019 Cafe Bazaar announced it has surpassed 40 million users. It gets roughly 20 million visits a week within Iran and its value is estimated at €380 million.

Cafe Bazaar is by far the most popular app store among Iranians, controlling 97% of the market. Cafe Bazaar is owned by Hezardastan Information Technology Development Group which also operates Divar (lit. 'wall'), a popular online classified ad service similar to Craigslist. According to an April 2018 report, Cafe Bazaar has 36 million users, with 29 million using the platform every month and 5.3 million using it every day. In 2017, Cafe Bazaar participated in the Mobile World Congress event in Barcelona, the world's largest mobile gathering, to introduce Iran's local mobile ecosystem resulting in many new partnerships.

== Content ==
Nearly 160,000 applications are available on Cafe Bazaar's platform covering a wide range of uses such as education, planning, ride-sharing, e-commerce, travel, lifestyle, wellness, and others. According to the report, citing data compiled between March 2017 and March 2018, income from gaming apps experienced a 94% year-on-year increase. Other apps also surged 64% compared to the year which ended in March 2017. 4.7 million apps are downloaded from Cafe Bazaar every day and 7.9 million apps are sold every month. Over 21,668 developer teams have published their work on Cafe Bazaar. While only 28% of the developer teams are based in Tehran, they hold a 71.6% share of the market turnover.

=== َApplications ===
According to the report, citing data compiled between March 2017 and March 2018, income from gaming apps experienced a 94% year-on-year increase. Other apps also surged 64% compared to the year which ended in March 2017. 4.7 million apps are downloaded from Cafe Bazaar every day and 7.9 million apps are sold every month.

According to the 2018 report, the most downloaded apps between March 2017 and March 2018 are as follows:

	Applications	Number of active Installations in the year
1	Divar (classifieds and sharing)	21 million+
4	My Irancell (official app of MTN Irancell)	13 million+
6	Up (financial services)	11 million +
10	My MCI (official app of Mobile Telecommunication Company of Iran)	10 million+
2	Baad Saba Calendar	9 million+
9	Telewebion (video)	8 million+
5	Snapp (ride sharing)	6 million+
7	Sheypoor (classifieds and sharing)	4 million+
3	Toolbox (Jabeh Abzar)	3 million+
8	Aparat (video sharing)	3 million+

=== Games ===
Cafe Bazaar has had much success with game downloads in the midst of the “raging success of mobile games” in Iran as demonstrated by the popularity of games like Clash of Clans. According to the 2013 survey, Iran had 18 million gamers between the ages of three and forty. Café Bazaar is increasingly looking towards games to drive future revenue. Chinese developers have already staked a prominent position in the games offered by Cafe Bazaar. Their app marketplace offers games from major international developers including Supercell, Tap4Fun, and Elex.

In terms of revenue generated from game users, Iran ranks third behind Turkey and Saudi Arabia in the west Asia region according to data compiled by Newzoo.

According to Cafe Bazaar, there are about 120 non-Iranian publishers and developers, with over 800 apps, that offer apps through its platform. App developers receive 70% of revenue from their apps. There are local publishers that work with foreign developers to localize apps and games for a Persian-speaking customer base.

=== Media and video ===
In 2018, Cafe Bazaar announced a new collaboration with local VOD and IPTV service providers like Filimo to deliver video streaming services. The new service, at its inception, largely focused on the 2018 World Cup. After that, the video content was diversified on the platform with the help of other content providers. Currently, thousands of film and television programs are provided on the platform, including all popular Iranian titles, in addition to an IPTV channel for kids.

== Financial transactions ==
As mobile games got more popular in Iran, Cafe Bazaar allowed In-App purchases with debit cards for popular foreign Android games. This is especially important as e-commerce is very popular in Iran and Debit Cards are the preferred system of payment. By 2015, 20% of Iranians reported shopping daily using their debit card, 24% weekly, and 28% on a monthly basis. As of 2016, Machinarium, Clash of Kings, Brothers in Arms 3, March of Empires, Township, King's Empire and other world renowned titles were participating in this mechanism. Prior to Cafe Bazaar facilitating the use of local debit cards for In-App purchases, users of foreign games like Clash of Clans, one of the most popular games in Iran, had to resort to using third-party websites were security was sometimes lacking and services were expensive.

== Parent company and shareholders ==
Cafe Bazaar is a product of Hezardastan Information Technology Development Group that is owned by an international group of shareholders. According to the company, their shareholders are as follows:

Name	Share (Percent)
Founders and managers	39.65
Employees’ incentive	1.31
Rahnema Kamyaban Nokhostin Co.	29.92
Novin Andishan Sarava Pars Co.	19.22
Other legal entities	7.85
Incentive Share Committed to Employees	2.06

Cafe Bazaar is part of a technology scene that has developed amid —and perhaps due to— international sanctions and strict censorship laws that have scared off global tech companies. Considering the fact that at the time, Google Play was not accessible to the Iranian users, Cafe Bazaar launched their marketplace offering not only the viral apps you see in Google Play, but local Iranian apps making a room for Iranian startups and app developers to launch their product in their homeland.

== Investment and diversification ==
In 2018, Amsterdam-based International Internet Investment Coöperatief (IIIC) committed to investing €38 million in Cafe Bazaar's parent company, Hezardastan Information Technology Development Group, in exchange for a 10% stake. Co-Founder and Chairman Hessam Armandehi told ILNA that “[o]ur management structure will remain intact after the investment. … The money will be used to develop new services including a cloud service.” He added that “We are planning to turn Cafe Bazaar into a unicorn startup.” The investment of the Dutch firm will facilitate Cafe Bazaar moving into new fields of innovation.

== Philanthropic work ==
Cafe Bazaar donated money to help rebuild a school in Revansar County, in the province of Kermanshah that was badly affected by the 2017 earthquake that devastated parts of western Iran. Cafe Bazaar teamed up with developers from Iran and abroad to raise funds. The school was opened on 26 November 2018.

Cafe Bazaar has sponsored a number of competitions and events aimed at promoting digital and programming knowledge in Iran and promoting Iran's information technology industry globally. These events include the 43rd ACM International Collegiate Programming Contest, the Iran Internet Programming Contest, the International Bebras Challenge on Informatics and Computational Thinking, and the annual Born in Iran festival. And building a site and designing an application and attending a webinar

== See also ==
- App stores
- Message Exchange Bus
- Bale
- Eitaa
- Rubika
- iGap
- Sourosh plus
- Filimo
