= ULS =

ULS can refer to:

== Education ==
- University Laboratory School, a charter school in Honolulu, Hawai‘i, United States
- University Lake School, in Wisconsin
- University of La Serena, in Chile
- University Liggett School, in Michigan

== Technology ==
- Ultimate Limit State, in engineering
- Universal Licensing System of US FCC
- Upward looking sonar
- User Location Service, a now depreciated network protocol, in computing

== Other uses ==
- Uganda Law Society
- Unduly lenient sentence, in the United Kingdom
- Uttara Lanka Sabhagaya, a political alliance in Sri Lanka
