= ZOOMIT =

Zoomit may refer to:

- Microsoft Identity Integration Server, a screen magnifier and annotation tool for Microsoft Windows
- Zoomit (website), a Persian-language online technology magazine
