= Footballi (media) =

Iranian sports news platform

- Company type: Private joint-stock
- Website type: Media
- Available in: Persian
- Area served: Sports news and coverage
- Editor: Chia Fouadi
- Services: Providing sports news
- Parent: Oddrun
- Subsidiaries: Stadium Internet Network
- Website: footballi.net
- Launched: 2018

Footballi is an Iranian sports news platform. Since 2018, this media outlet has been owned by Oddrun Company, producing sports content, particularly in football, and covering football news and developments in Iran and worldwide.

== History ==
Footballi was initially designed as an application by Oddrun Company to provide live football match results for Iran and the world. Although the app had been available since 2014, it operated without producing original content until June 2018. Eventually, the company decided to establish a content management department, and the platform began producing exclusive content.

In 2018, Chia Fouadi was appointed as the editor-in-chief and managing director of the Footballi news platform. From 2014 to 2018, he served as the editor of the website and social media of the television program Navad. Additionally, from 2017 to 2019, he held voting rights in the FIFA Best Awards as a representative of Iran.

Paniz Farahnak, recognized as one of the first female sports reporters in Iran, is a member of Footballi's editorial team. She is also among the first female sports media managers in Iran, a position she attained through the Paykan F.C. organization. The news from this sports website is also available on social media platforms such as Instagram, Telegram, Twitter, YouTube, and Rubika. Additionally, the Stadium Internet Network is one of its subsidiaries.

According to published reports, the Footballi website receives approximately 85 million monthly visits. Meanwhile, according to Oddrun (the parent company), the Footballi application has 1.5 million daily active users and 3 million daily visits. Footballi was the first media outlet to expose the corruption scandal at Mes Rafsanjan Football Club.
