= Zoomit (website) =

Iranian technology website

- Native name: Zoomit
- Type: Private
- Industry: Digital media, Technology
- Founded: September 2010
- Founders: Masoud Yousefnejad, Mahdi Yousefnejad
- Headquarters: Tehran, Iran
- Area served: International
- Products: Technology news, Product reviews, Videos, Podcasts, Buying guides
- Owner: Qalam Ayandeh Iranians Institute
- Subsidiaries: Zoomji; Kojaro; Pedal; Zoobin; Filmzi; Zooman; ZoomApp
- Website: zoomit.ir

Zoomit is an Iranian website specializing in information technology, technology news, electronic product reviews, buying guides, and analytical content.

== History ==
Zoomit was founded in September 2010 by the Yousefnejad brothers — Masoud Yousefnejad (CEO and Editor-in-Chief) and Mahdi Yousefnejad. Masoud Yousefnejad, an Iranian entrepreneur and media figure, had worked for nearly ten years at Madiran Corporation before founding Zoomit, gaining experience in marketing, product management, and content production. The website initially launched with a small team of three people and limited capital, and continued its work by publishing technology product reviews.

In its early years, Zoomit faced economic and content production challenges, but gradually grew and in 2025 celebrated its fifteenth anniversary.

== Activities and achievements ==
Zoomit focuses on producing news, product reviews, educational videos, podcasts, and product comparison tools. As of 2024–2025, the website had approximately 19 to 20 million unique monthly visitors and had published more than 150,000 articles. Total user reading time has been around 97 million hours, and video views have exceeded 120 million.

Zoomit's products section includes a database of more than 70,000 electronic items, and the "Zoobin" service has been introduced as an advanced tool for product comparison and informed purchasing.

Zoomit operates a media family that includes Zoomji (video games and entertainment, since 2014), Kojaro (travel, since 2015), Pedal (automotive, since 2021), and Zoobin (product comparison service, since 2025).

The media outlet operates with more than 170 staff members and has held two large in-person gatherings: the first in February 2025 with more than 1,070 in-person attendees, and the second in 2025 with approximately 1,100 people.

Zoomit is recognized as the most widely followed Persian-language technology media outlet, and emphasizes resilience in the face of economic challenges and internet restrictions.

== Cyberattack ==
In January 2026, coinciding with a nationwide internet outage in Iran, the Qalam Ayandeh media group (including Zoomit, Zoomji, Pedal, Kojaro, and other subsidiaries) was targeted by a large-scale cyberattack. The attack was carried out at the virtualization layer of the infrastructure and caused a disruption of approximately five days in access to the websites.

Zoomit's technical team managed to restore the websites without any user data being compromised. Masoud Yousefnejad, Zoomit's CEO, published a transparent written and video report detailing the technical aspects of the attack, how the intrusion occurred, and lessons learned. The incident was covered by several Iranian and international outlets including Iran International and Digiato.

Masoud Yousefnejad, in an interview with Peivast regarding the hackers' motivations and identity, stated:

Honestly, I have no idea why the attack happened, because we don't have any valuable data — all our data is published and publicly accessible. Furthermore, the nature of the attack was such that no user data was accessed at all; it was simply total destruction from the top down. I can't say exactly who carried it out or with what motive. When we published the attack announcement, we received some very strange comments. Some said we had enemies or that we were targeted by a particular faction. But personally, I don't attribute it to any of that. However, a Chinese hacker group has claimed responsibility for the attack, and I will announce their name within the next week or two. Whether that Chinese group found us on their own or was hired to carry out the attack is entirely unclear. Personally, who carried out the attack doesn't matter much to me. What matters to me is that there was a vulnerability in our network that allowed the intrusion. On the other hand, we are glad that we discovered the vulnerability and can now prevent it going forward.

Masoud Yousefnejad, in the same interview with Peivast regarding assistance from government bodies, stated:

No institution or organization even contacted us — and the most painful part of the story was our isolation throughout the incident. The only people who helped us were the team at Parspack. A few days after everything happened and all services were restored, a security agency did contact Zoomit and asked for an account of events but offered no assistance. So, if a cyberattack like this happens to us again, we're on our own.

== Media censorship ==
During the US and Israeli war with Iran in 2025, international internet access in Iran was severely restricted and effectively transformed into a national intranet. Under these circumstances, the comment sections of some domestic media outlets became one of the few remaining spaces for public expression.

According to Al Jazeera, Zoomit — one of the most popular Persian-language technology media outlets — hosted a large volume of critical user comments regarding the state of the internet and the situation in the country. Following the publication of these comments in large numbers, the judiciary issued an order to shut down Zoomit's comment section.

Zoomit and similar outlets such as Digiato and Citna published numerous reports throughout this period on the effects of the internet outage on businesses, cybersecurity, education, and daily life, striving to provide up-to-date and independent information to their audiences.

== See also ==
- Digikala
- Snapp
- Tapsi
- Divar
- Sheypoor
