= MXB =

MXB or mxb can refer to:

- Message Exchange Bus (MXB), an Iranian cross-platform instant messaging (IM) technology
- Andi Jemma Airport, an airport near Masamba, South Sulawesi province, Indonesia, by ICAO code
- Silacayoapan Mixtec, a language native to central Mexico, by ISO 639 code
- Malir railway station, a train station in Karachi, Pakistan, by train station code
- Mex Blue, an airline from Mexico; see List of airline codes
