= Neshan =

Neshan may refer to:

- Neshan language
- Neshan (software)
