= Port of Shahid Rajaee explosion =

2025 explosion in Hormozgan province, Iran

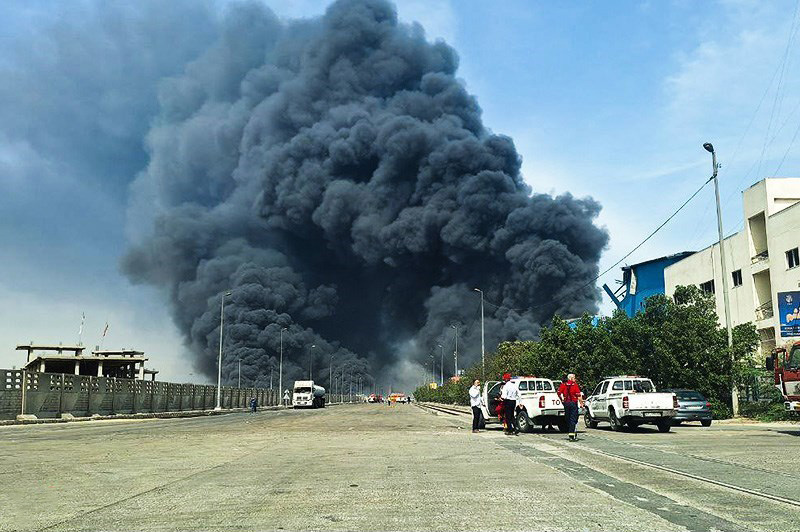
- Smoke billowing after the explosion
- Date: 26 April 2025
- Time: 12:20 IRST (UTC+03:30)
- Location: Port of Shahid Rajaee, Bandar Abbas, Hormozgan, Iran; 27°07′27″N 56°04′03″E
- Type: Gas substances explosion
- Cause: Fire
- Deaths: 57 per the judiciary of Iran; 250 per the National Council of Resistance of Iran
- Injuries: 1,000+ per the judiciary of Iran; 1,500 per the National Council of Resistance of Iran

On 26 April 2025, an explosion and fire occurred at the Port of Shahid Rajaee in southern Iran, which is part of Bandar Abbas's larger port infrastructure, killing 57 people and injuring over 1,000 others, according to state media reports. The blast, at around 12:20 Iran Standard Time, originated from several containers in the port's wharf area, possibly containing ammonium perchlorate, a strong oxidizer used in rocket fuel. The explosion occurred amid the Iran–United States negotiations for Iran's nuclear program, with the Iranian foreign minister saying that security was on high alert. The country's government ordered a media blackout on the explosion.

Video of the fire and subsequent explosion

== Background ==
The Port of Shahid Rajaee is Iran's largest commercial port and maritime hub, handling approximately 80 million tons of goods annually. Located on the north shores of the strategic Strait of Hormuz, it serves as a critical hub for the country's maritime trade. The port is approximately 23 kilometres (14 miles) west of Bandar Abbas and is adjacent to facilities operated by the Islamic Revolutionary Guard Corps (IRGC).

In 2020, Israel launched a cyberattack that hampered operations at the Shahid Rajaee port.

The explosion occurred as the Iran–United States negotiations were held in Oman with the aim of reaching an agreement regarding Iran's nuclear program. Before the meetings began, Iran's foreign minister Abbas Araghchi said that "our security services are on high alert given past instances of attempted sabotage and assassination operations designed to provoke a legitimate response".

== Explosion and immediate impact ==
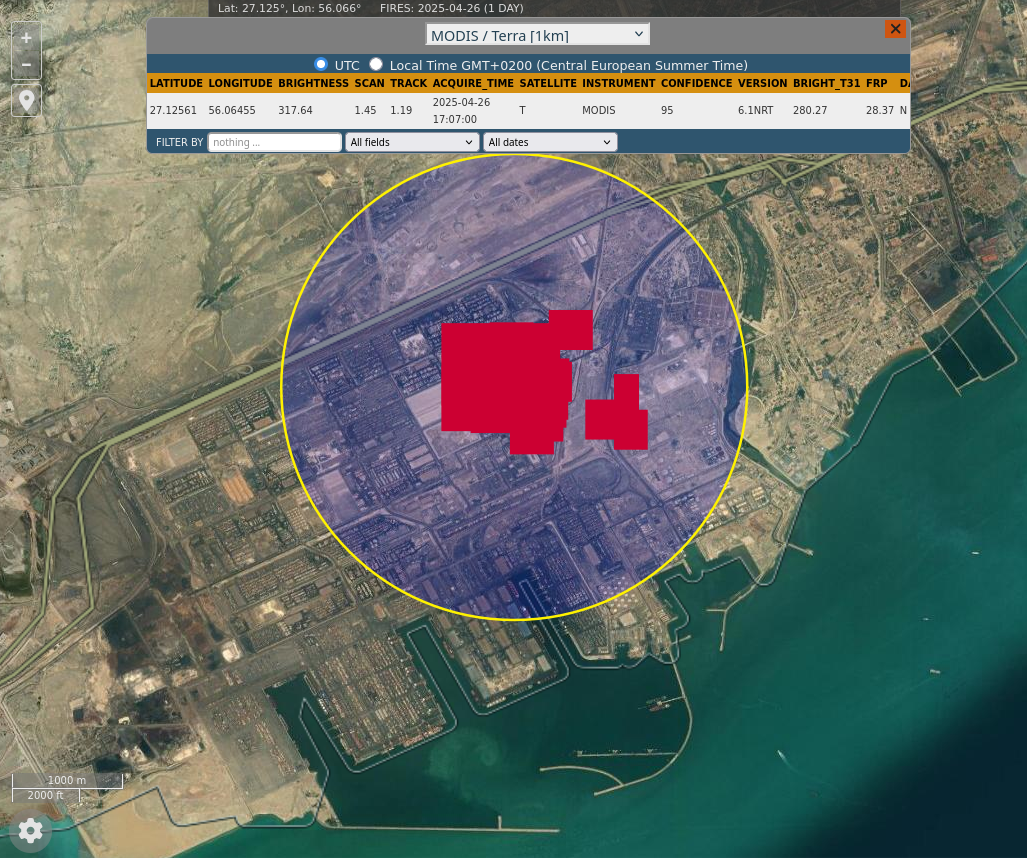
NASA's FIRMS detected the fire on 26 April 2025 at 17:07 (UTC).

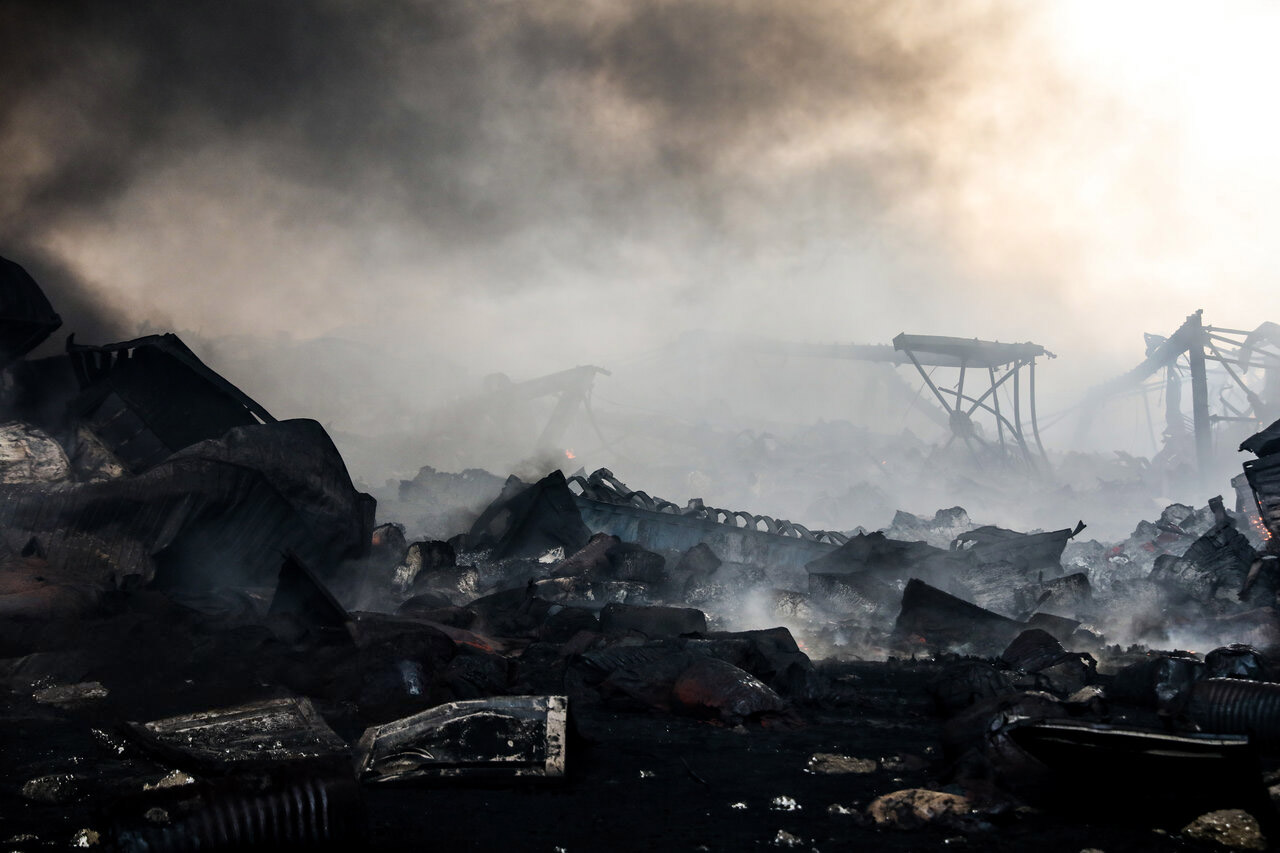
Damage caused by the fires

On 26 April 2025, at approximately 12:00 Iran Standard Time (IRST), an increasingly intense fire that contained reddish-hued smoke led to a large explosion in the Sina container yard within the port. Fifteen firefighters and all the staff inside the administrative building were killed in the initial explosion. The blast originated from several containers and produced a large fire and a plume of black smoke visible for kilometers. The shockwave shattered windows and caused structural damage to buildings several kilometers away. At least one building collapsed due to the blast. The explosion was reportedly heard as far as Qeshm Island, 26 kilometers (16 miles) south of Bandar Abbas, and was felt at a distance of 50 kilometres (31 mi) from the site.

== Casualties and emergency response ==
According to initial reports, at least 70 people were killed in the explosion while 1,210 others were injured, 138 of them seriously. The casualty figure was later revised by the judiciary to 57 fatalities and more than 1,000 injuries as body parts were counted as a whole body. Maryam Rajavi of the National Council of Resistance of Iran accused Iran of covering up the death toll and was several times higher than officially reported, saying closer to 250 people were killed and an estimated 1,500 others were injured. The Chinese consulate in Bandar Abbas said three Chinese nationals were among the injured. Emergency services, including the Iranian Red Crescent Society, dispatched rapid response teams to the scene. Injured individuals were evacuated and transported to nearby medical facilities and as far as Shiraz. Firefighting efforts were undertaken to control and extinguish the blaze using helicopters to pour water onto the fire from above. Port operations were suspended temporarily to facilitate emergency response activities. Schools and offices in the area were ordered closed on 27 April, while the health ministry advised residents not to go outside "until further notice" and to use protective masks. Russia sent a firefighting aircraft and personnel to help extinguish the fire. By 27 April, only 190 of the injured were still being treated in the hospital. The fires were declared contained on 28 April.

On 27 April, Iranian president Masoud Pezeshkian visited Bandar Abbas and met with emergency personnel and victims of the disaster. The governor of Hormozgan province, Mohammad Ashouri, declared three days of mourning for the victims, while a national day of mourning was declared on 28 April.

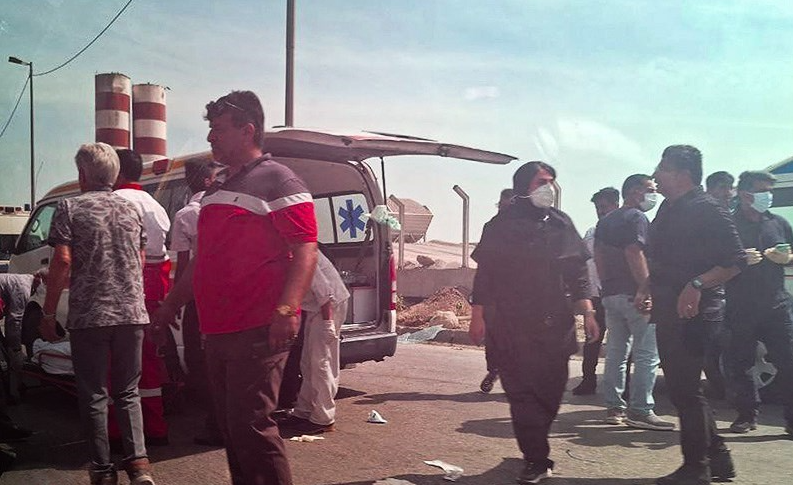
Wounded survivors being picked up by ambulances

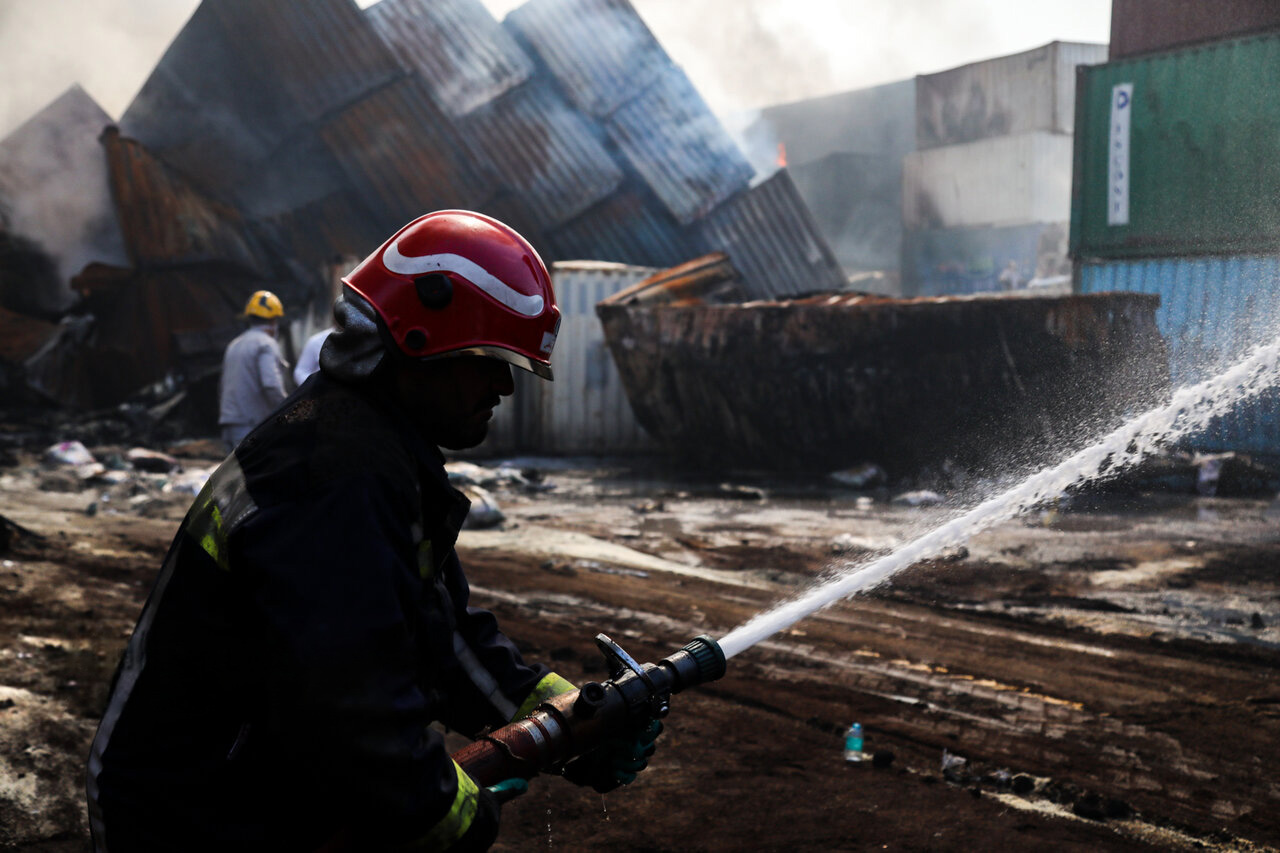
Firefighting at the scene

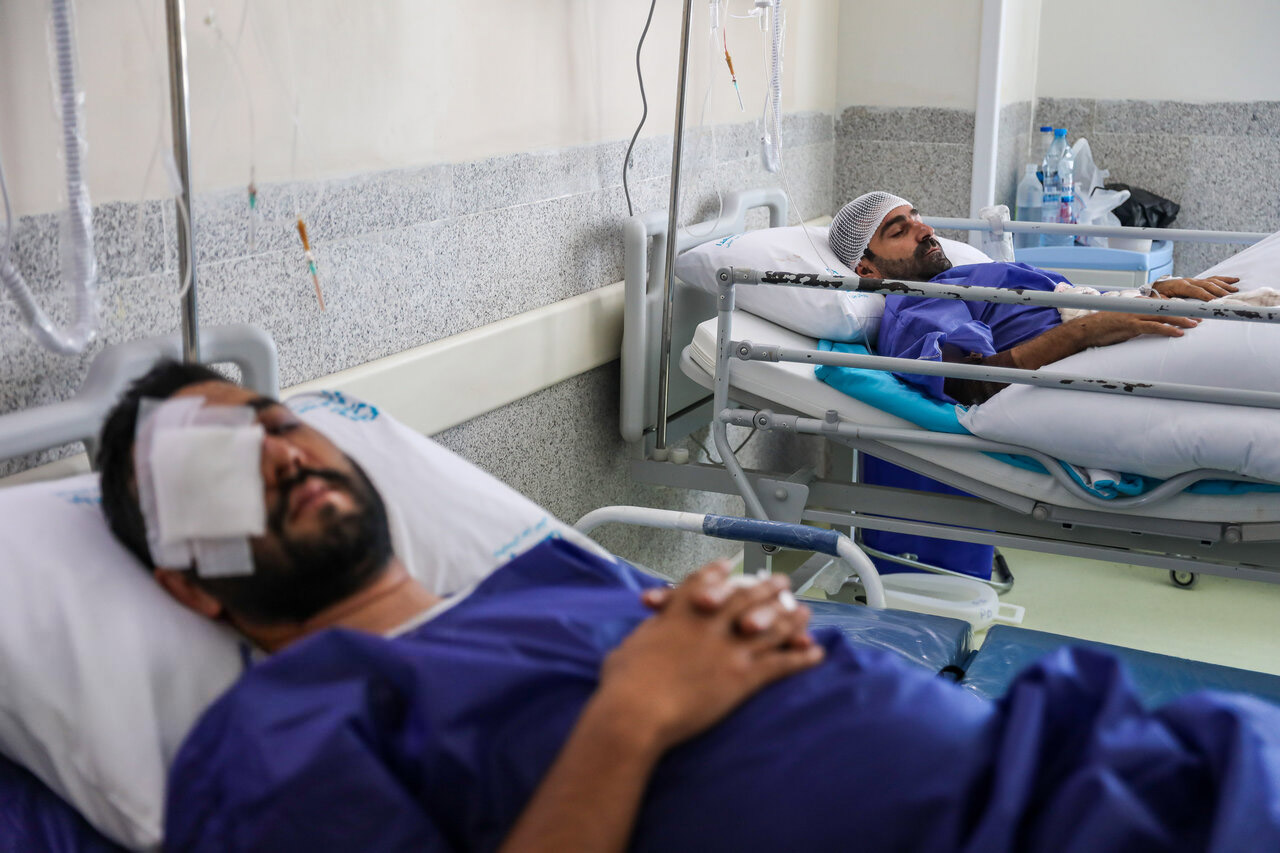
Victims of the incident in hospital

== Investigation ==
Authorities launched an investigation into the cause of the explosion. Preliminary assessments suggested that negligence in handling flammable materials may have contributed to the incident. The National Iranian Oil Refining and Distribution Company stated that the explosion was not related to its infrastructure, including refineries, fuel tanks, distribution complexes, or oil pipelines. A government spokeswoman, Fatemeh Mohajerani, said: "containers were stored in a corner of the port that likely contained chemicals which exploded. But until the fire is extinguished, it's hard to ascertain the cause."

One analyst compared the blast to the 2020 Beirut explosion stating that it is consistent with an ignition and explosion of sodium perchlorate (used to make rocket fuel) or ammonium nitrate (used as fertilizer). The explosion has also been linked to a shipment of ammonium perchlorate, a strong oxidizer used in rocket fuel. A named maritime risk consultancy firm believed the explosion was caused by improper handling of ammonium perchlorate. The port received a shipment of ammonium perchlorate in March from China to replenish Iran's stock for producing missiles.

Without naming specific chemicals, Iranian authorities stated on 27 April 2025 that the explosion was caused by "hazardous goods and chemical materials" stored in the port. A spokesperson for the Iranian defense ministry, Reza Talaei-Nik, denied that missile fuel had been transported via the site, without providing a possible cause of the explosion.

On 28 April 2025, Iran's Interior Minister, Eskandar Momeni, announced that the explosion was caused by negligence and non-compliance with safety measures. He stated that some individuals have been identified and summoned in connection with the incident, highlighting shortcomings in adhering to safety precautions and passive defense protocols. Momeni emphasized that the hazardous materials involved should have been dispersed to prevent such a disaster.

On May 4, two people, including a government official, were arrested by Iranian authorities in connection with the explosion.

== Economic impact ==
The Port of Shahid Rajaee is Iran's largest maritime hub, handling approximately 80 million tons of goods annually and accounting for 85–90% of the country's container traffic, as well as 55% of Iran's total trade. It is also the 44th largest port in the world based on its handling capacity. The explosion led to the suspension of all imports and exports through the port. This disruption halted a substantial portion of Iran's trade activities, impacting revenue streams and the supply chain for essential goods. Despite the magnitude of the explosion, Iran's oil infrastructure, including refineries and pipelines in the vicinity, remained operational. The port's closure may impede the export of oil and related products, which are critical for Iran's economy and foreign currency earnings.

The head of the Iran Road Maintenance & Transportation Organization reported on 30 April 2025 that the activities of loading, unloading and announcing cargo in the port had returned to normal conditions.

== Reactions ==
Messages were sent by Saudi Arabia, the United Arab Emirates, as well as China, Afghanistan, India, Pakistan, Russia, Turkey, and the United Nations.

Iran's Supreme Leader Ali Khamenei called for an investigation by security and judicial officials to identify negligence or deliberate actions leading to the disaster. He also offered condolences to the injured and thanked those who donated blood to victims.

Amnesty International accused the Iranian government of suppressing media outlets over the cause of the explosion.

== Environmental and wildlife impact ==
The explosion at the Shahid Rajaee Port had notable environmental consequences. According to reports, the blast released large quantities of toxic substances, including sulfur dioxide and nitrogen oxides, into the atmosphere, leading to severe air pollution in the Bandar Abbas region. Residents were advised to remain indoors, and concerns were raised about long-term health effects. The combustion of goods stored in containers, including food items like meat, fish, and poultry, resulted in chemical runoff contaminating the Persian Gulf waters. Concerns were raised about the potential impact on marine biodiversity.

The explosion also had a significant impact on wildlife, especially birds in the surrounding area. According to experts including Iman Ebrahimi, the pollutants released during the incident have been linked to reduced fertility and breeding success among avian populations near the port. Environmental experts have emphasized the need for long-term monitoring and mitigation measures to prevent further ecological damage.

== See also ==
- Largest artificial non-nuclear explosions
  - 2015 Tianjin explosions, a series of explosions at the Port of Tianjin in China that killed 173 people and injured 798
  - 2022 Sitakunda fire, a fire and explosions at a container depot in Bangladesh that killed at least 47 people and injured around 450
  - PEPCON disaster, an ammonium perchlorate-related explosion
  - 2020 Beirut explosion
- List of explosions in the 2000s
- Iran explosions (January – February 2026)
