= Mehdi Yahyanejad =

Iranian businessman (born 1975)

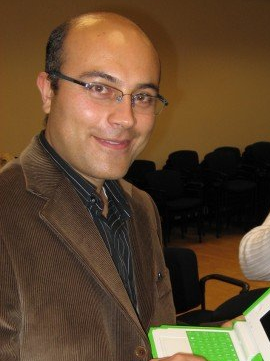
- Born: 1975 (age 50–51); Iran
- Occupation: Entrepreneur

Mehdi Yahyanejad (born 1975) is a tech entrepreneur who founded Balatarin.com, a news sharing website in Persian in 2006. Balatarin has been blocked by the Iranian government in Iran and has been the target of hacking and DDoS attacks by the Iranian government. Mehdi Yahyanejad has also co-founded NetFreedom Pioneers which is an organization dedicated increasing access to Internet. He launched the Toosheh project, a method to stream data files to Iran through satellite television in April 2016. He works on building technologies to allow Internet access in remote areas and offline content sharing. He has also published a number of articles and educational videos on cyber security to train journalist and citizen journalists.

== Early life ==
Mehdi Yahyanejad was born in Iran in 1975. He attended Alborz High School and studied physics at Sharif University in Tehran. He completed his PhD in physics from MIT in 2004. He was a post doctoral fellow at Stanford University conducting research on computational genetics.

== Honours, and awards ==
Mehdi Yahyanejad is the winner of a bronze medal for the Iranian science team at the 1993 International Physics Olympiad. In 2006, his weekly podcast Radio Haftegi received a User Award at The BOBs (weblog award) organized by Deutsche Welle.

== Bibliography ==
- Liberation Technology (Contributing Author)
- Gigaom Article: Activists vow to defeat Iran's Internet censorship
- Interview: BBC Persian Click with Mehdi Yahyanejad on Toosheh Project(2016)
- Baldino, Daniel; Goold, Jarrad (2014). "Iran and the emergence of information and communications technology: the evolution of revolution?". Australian Journal of International Affairs. 68 (1): 17–35. doi:10.1080/10357718.2013.840263. S2CID 154941710.

== See also ==
- Balatarin
