= Eitaa =

Iranian instant messenger and social media service

- Other names: پیام‌رسان ایتا
- Developer: Eitaa Inc.
- Operating system: Android; iOS; macOS; Windows; Linux; Web app
- Platform: Cross-platform
- Size: 54 MB (Android)
- Available in: Persian; English; Arabic
- Type: Instant messaging; Social media
- License: Proprietary
- Website: eitaa.com

Eitaa (Persian: ایتا) is an Iranian cloud-based, cross-platform, instant messaging (IM), social media and VoIP service developed by Eitaa Inc. It is the most popular messaging app in Iran, with more than 70 million users and the largest messaging app based in West Asia. Eitaa enables users to send text and voice messages, share images and videos, make voice and video calls, share files and locations, pay bills, and access AI, services and more.

Eitaa is available on Android, iOS, macOS, Windows, Linux, and the web. Registration requires a mobile telephone number.

== History ==
Eitaa was introduced as part of Iran's growing digital ecosystem. Over the years, it has become the most popular messaging app in Iran, meeting the communication, business, and social networking needs of both domestic and international users.

== Features ==
Eitaa has a range of features designed for communication and user experience. These include text and voice messaging, multimedia sharing, voice and video calls, and file sharing. It has unlimited cloud storage and is usable internationally. The platform also provides payment services for tasks such as paying bills, making purchases, and conducting transactions securely and has two step verification for securing accounts. Users can share their real-time location and access a variety of services through bots, including customer support and bill payments.

== Message Exchange Bus (MXB) ==
Eitaa is connected to the Message Exchange Bus (MXB), which is a technology that connects major Iranian messaging platforms including Bale, Eitaa, Rubika, Gap, iGap and Soroush. MXB enables users to send end-to-end encrypted messages and files, make voice and video calls and more to over 200 million users between these apps without needing a separate account for each one, offering communication regardless of the platform used. This system is instrumental in creating a unified messaging ecosystem in Iran and is created for the first time in Iran.

== Social networking ==
Eitaa has some social networking features, including the ability for users to follow public accounts, participate in channels, share updates, photos, and videos. While the platform is widely adopted for social interaction, its features aim to meet a broad range of user needs, contributing to its growing use as a social platform.

== Services ==
=== Banking Services ===
Eitaa offers banking features, including bill payments, account recharges, and other financial tasks. These services are integrated into the app, allowing users to perform various financial transactions.

=== Bots and AI ===
Eitaa includes AI-powered bots that assist with tasks such as subscription management, business services, and customer support. These bots are intended to automate certain processes within the app.

== Availability ==
All of Eitaa 's features are available internationally, including messaging, voice and video calls, file transfers, Social Networking Services, bots and AI.

Eitaa was removed from both the Google Play Store and the Apple App Store, along with several other Iranian apps. This removal came as part of a broader action taken by these American platforms to restrict access to apps from Iran. Despite this, Eitaa continues to be available through other app stores like Bazaar and Myket and to direct download, maintaining its user base.

== See also ==
- Message Exchange Bus
- Secure instant messaging
- Bale
- Rubika
- iGap
- Sourosh plus
