= Bale Messenger =

Iranian instant messenger, banking app and social media service

Bale
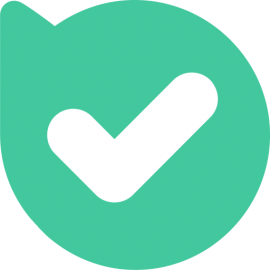
- Other names: پیام‌رسان بانکی بله
- Developer: National Bank of Iran
- Release: December 2016; 9 years ago
- Stable release: 9.64.11 (94370) (Android) 3.22.0 (95773) (Web app)
- Operating system: Android; iOS; Web app
- Platform: Cross-platform
- Size: 62 MB (Android)
- Available in: Persian; English; Arabic; Turkish (Azeri)
- Type: Instant messaging; Social media; Mobile payment
- License: Proprietary
- Website: bale.ai

Bale (Persian: بله, Yes) is an Iranian cloud-based, cross-platform, instant messaging (IM), social media, mobile payment and VoIP service developed by the National Bank of Iran. It is one of the most popular messaging apps in Iran and West Asia, with more than 60 million users. It allows users to send text and voice messages, share images and videos, make voice and video calls, share files and user locations, send money, pay bills, use bots, AI, services and more.

Because of its integration of banking, AI, services and messaging features, many of its functionalities are unique. Bale's client application runs on Android and can also be accessed from computers and iOS devices via its web app. The service requires a mobile telephone number for registration.

== History ==
Bale was launched in December 2016, with the goal of providing a secure and versatile messaging service that integrates financial transactions. The app was developed to address the growing demand for unified services, combining communication, payments, and Services within a single platform. Bale is widely used in Iran and surrounding regions, offering both communication and financial services.

== Features ==
Bale integrates financial services into its messaging platform, allowing users to send and receive money directly within the app. This removes the need for third-party payment applications, enabling transactions such as mobile recharges, utility bill payments, and fund transfers. Additionally, users can send and receive gifts or money requests via their Bale ID or phone number, without requiring the recipient’s payment details. The platform also provides the option for users to set up a username, which allows others to find them without sharing their phone number.

The platform supports cross-platform functionality, with a web version that works independently of the mobile app. This allows users to access their messages and data seamlessly across devices, with synchronized personal data, such as chat history, media, and contacts, without the need for a backup when switching devices with unlimited cloud storage and is usable internationally. Bale’s web apps are optimized for all devises, providing performance across multiple platforms. Furthermore, group calling allows up to 64 people to join a Bale group voice and video call which is available on both mobile and web versions, facilitating high-quality, face-to-face interactions.

Bale takes security and privacy seriously, especially with its financial features. It uses strong encryption to protect both messages and financial transactions, helping to keep everything secure and has two step verification for securing accounts. The app adheres to data protection standards. Additionally, users have the option to change their phone number while retaining all their personal data, including account information, messages, and group settings. For those wishing to delete all their data, an account deletion option is available. Bale’s services are accessible globally, supporting users with any SIM card or phone number in their messaging and financial transactions.

It has other functionalities, such as an in-app video and music player, a browser, a verification system for identifying digital payment receipts and one-time password (OTP) service.

== Message Exchange Bus (MXB) ==
Bale is connected to the Message Exchange Bus (MXB), which is a technology that connects major Iranian messaging platforms including Bale, Eitaa, Rubika, Gap, iGap and Soroush. MXB enables users to send end-to-end encrypted messages and files, make voice and video calls and more to over 200 million users between these apps without needing a separate account for each one ensuring uninterrupted communication regardless of the platform used. This system is instrumental in creating a unified messaging ecosystem in Iran and is created for the first time in Iran.

== Social networking services ==
Bale has three main sections: the Chat section, the Flow section, and the Services section. Social networking services are primarily focused in the Flow section of the app, which is divided into the Vitrin and Magazine sections and displays both user and other users' statuses.

- Vitrin section: This section displays numerous channels that are categorized and searchable.
- Magazine section: This section features the best content from channels, as voted by users, displayed in a scrollable, short video format.
- Chat section: In this section, users can access viral channels.

=== Channels and broadcasts ===
Bale supports channels where users can subscribe to receive broadcast messages. These channels allow businesses, public figures, and organizations to communicate directly with large audiences through streamlined updates, news, and offers.

=== Statuses ===
Users can set personal statuses visible to their contacts or to all users. These statuses are used for self-expression or to share information about activities, moods, or events.

== Marketing and economic features ==
- Online storefront (Feshnook): Bale includes an integrated online marketplace, allowing businesses to establish virtual stores where users can browse products, make purchases, and pay seamlessly within the app.
- Advertising and promotions: The platform offers advertising tools for businesses to create targeted marketing campaigns. Businesses can run ads, promote products and services, and reach potential customers via sponsored messages or promoted content within the app.

== Services ==
=== Banking services ===
Bale provides various banking services, including a digital wallet, the ability to receive money via messages without the need for card details, and the option to link bank cards for transaction tracking. Users can also receive notifications about account balances, transfers, and transaction activities.

=== Bots and AI ===
Bale supports a robust bot ecosystem with over 30,000 active bots, offering solutions for a wide range of tasks. These include AI-powered bots, such as ChatGPT for natural language processing, and advanced image-generation AI for creating images. Additionally, Bale offers bots that assist in intercepting and tracking mail from postal services, providing updates on delivery status. The platform also integrates psychological philanthropy bots that use artificial intelligence for mental health support and counseling services. These bots, alongside many others, provide diverse functionalities, ensuring users have access to a wide variety of services.

==== Bot development frameworks ====
Bale provides several frameworks to facilitate bot development:

- Balethon: A Python library designed for creating bots in Bale. It provides a high-level, asynchronous programming interface that supports both functional and object-oriented designs, offering flexibility and extensibility for developers.
- python-bale-bot: An API wrapper for Bale written in Python, enabling developers to send and receive messages through bots and interact with Bale's messaging platform.
- Bale Bot SDK: A PHP SDK for developing bots on Bale, supporting the Laravel framework and including add-ons to enhance the development experience.
- BaleBotAPI: A .NET Standard 2.0 package that allows developers to build bots for Bale using the .NET framework.

== Child mode ==
Bale includes a "Child Mode" feature designed to provide a safer and more controlled environment for younger users. This mode restricts access to certain features and content, ensuring a family-friendly experience. In Child Mode, parents or guardians can customize settings to filter out inappropriate content, limit the types of interactions children can have, and control which channels and messages the child can access. Parents can select specific sections to be shown to the child, providing more control over the child's app usage. To exit Child Mode, a PIN must be entered, ensuring that the child cannot leave the mode without parental permission.

== Availability ==
All of Bale's features are available internationally, including messaging, voice and video calls, file transfers, Social Networking Services, bots and AI. The exception is its financial services, which are limited to the Iranian currency, Rial.

In 2022, Bale was removed from both the Google Play Store and the Apple App Store, along with several other Iranian apps. This removal came as part of a broader action taken by these American platforms to restrict access to apps from Iran. Despite this, Bale continues to be available on Android through direct downloads and other app stores like Bazaar and Myket and on iOS through its web app, maintaining its user base.

== See also ==
- Message Exchange Bus
- Secure instant messaging
- Eitaa
- Rubika
- iGap
- Sourosh plus
