= ASL19 =

Technology organization

ASL19 (Persian: اصل ١٩) is an independent technology organisation that works toward practical responses for online information access. It is based in Toronto. ASL19 was founded in 2012 with the support of the University of Toronto's Citizen Lab. It maintains the FactNameh fact-checking website.

== FactNameh ==
ASL19 launched FactNameh, a Persian language fact-checking website, in 2017.

== Allegations of sexual assault ==
An investigative report by The Verge and an open letter from anonymous former female employees alleged workplace abuse and harassment. A freedom of information request from Ontario human rights tribunal revealed an allegation of abuse and sexual assault. ASL19 managing staff were allegedly complicit in covering up the alleged abuse. In the one reported case the organisation reportedly sought a non-disclosure agreement.

Digital rights organisation Access Now terminated their partnership with ASL19 for their RightsCon summit series in December 2017. Access Now stated they will only reengage with ASL19 once they "feel confident that any reports of misconduct have been investigated and there has been an appropriate response."
