= MTN Irancell =

Iranian telecommunications company

- Type: Semi-private
- Industry: Mobile network operator
- Founded: 2005; 21 years ago
- Headquarters: Tehran, Iran
- Area served: Nationwide
- Key people: Mohammadhossein Soleimanian (CEO)
- Products: Mobile broadband services, and TD-LTE fixed wireless broadband services
- Website: www.irancell.ir

MTN Irancell, also known as Irancell, is an Iranian telecommunications company that operates Iran's largest 2G-3G-4G-4.5G-5G mobile network, and fixed wireless TD-LTE internet services. As of 2013, Irancell holds a revenue of 4.9 billion dollars. It is the 32nd largest company in Iran. Currently, MTN Group holds a 49% percent stake in the Irancell consortium, while Kowsar Sign Paniz (KSP) holds the other 51% of shares.

On 3 December 2014, Irancell officially launched Iran's first 4G LTE network in nine cities. The License was granted as on a national basis and includes the overall geographical coverage of Iran. Irancell was officially launched on 21 October 2006 in Tehran, Tabriz, and Mashhad. The network provides the subscribers with an advanced generation of GSM system to enable them to get used of EDGE (2.75 G).

Irancell made countrywide coverage with FD-LTE and TD-LTE. As of December 2021, Irancell has 50.4 million active subscribers. Irancell, the company, has been able to receive the "Special Digital Public Relations Award" and the "National Award for Excellence in Public Relations in Electronic and Virtual Communications." According to this report, the company has achieved high scores in the seventeenth edition of the International Public Relations Symposium and the eighteenth edition of Iran's Best Public Relations Awards.

As of 2024, it has around 43% market share in Iranian mobile communication industry sector.

== Sustainability ==
MTN Irancell has 2,272 full time employees. Around 35% of them are women.

As of 2023, the company's nationwide operations include around 17,396 LTE BTS towers, 300 5G enabled towers, and 2000 internet fiber optic towers, covering 92.7% nationally, and 66 million active simcard subscriptions, around 16% of percent of which are located in Tehran . It has around 10000 stores. It has sold around 600,000 internet router modems in 2023.

It has a BNPL program.

An IPO was being evaluated by the company in 2021.

=== Apps ===
- MyIrancell
- JibJet wallet in association with Bank Mellat
- Y’ello Name, YellowPool wallet in association with Civil Registration Organization

== Funding ==
Shareholders include MTN Irancell, Telecommunication Company of Iran, IEDC Gostaresh Electronic, Ministry of Defense, Bonyad Mostazafan

The company is a major shareholder in Iranian Towers, and of MCI's Rubika.

== Controversy ==
=== Sanctions ===
According to Reuters, the company was able to obtain banned U.S. technologies despite imposed sanctions against Iran.

=== Sunni insult and boycott ===
In July 2013, Iran's Sunni community which is the second-largest religious group, accused the company of insulting caliph Umar after he was called "deceived by the Devil" in a competition's question. People in predominantly Sunni Provinces Kurdistan and Sistan & Baluchestan boycotted the company and a Sunni MP voiced their anger in a parliamentary session. Irancell later apologized for the 'unintentional mistake'.

=== Mobile web pricing ===
After Irancell doubled the prices for its mobile web services in December 2014, some angered users started protesting the company via the social media. Subscribers decided to hold a boycott on the company and remove their SIM cards altogether on 31 December 2014.

=== Subscribers' privacy leak ===
Irancell has been criticized for its privacy policy. In July 2016, a robot known as MTN Bot leaked data on personal information of millions of Irancell subscribers on Telegram. Irancell did not pledge responsibility for the leakage and accused its rivals for the turmoil caused by the news. On 3 July 2016, Minister of Communications Mahmoud Vaezi told that the data was leaked by an intelligence agent when Irancell handed subscribers' data to an anonymous intelligence agency in Iran upon an inquiry in 2014.

=== Ad injection ===
In November 2017, Minister of Communications Mohammad Javad Jahromi warned Irancell over its ad injection.
