= Toosheh =

Satellite data transfer technology

Toosheh (lit. 'Knapsack' in Persian) is a satellite filecasting technology deployed in Iran and the Middle East that uses common satellite equipment to deliver digital content without relying on access to the Internet. Developed in response to Internet censorship in Iran, it was created by NetFreedom Pioneers, a California-based nonprofit organization, and launched by Executive Director (and tech entrepreneur) Mehdi Yahyanejad in 2015.

== Technology ==
As a data transfer technology, it distributes content that would otherwise be inaccessible to those who have limited or no internet access due to censorship, high cost, living in a remote location, government-backed shutdowns, or unreliable technical infrastructure. Furthermore, it requires no hardware other than the conventional home TV satellite set-top box (see bibliography).

Digital content and data is embedded in a standard TV video stream as .ts files and transmitted over a satellite TV channel. “Audiences record this video stream from their common satellite TV receiver to a USB drive, transfer it to their smartphone or computer, and use Toosheh software to decode this video stream back into text, audio, or video files to be made available for viewing." In short, content is hidden inside video files and can then be extracted for users with the Toosheh software.

This process was created to work with no Internet infrastructure. As reported it can facilitate data transfer when no other communication method is available. In addition, the satellite broadcast stream allows for recovery of data that could be lost mid-transmission due to harsh weather conditions or sound waves used to jam satellite signals. Data sent over satellite is untraceable and thus thwarts censorship-prone governments or institutions from identifying those who are accessing content received through Toosheh. The system has a minimum data transfer rate of 1 Mbit/s and can thus transfer tens of gigabytes of digital data per day.

Toosheh currently distributes content through the Yahsat Y1B satellite with coverage over the majority of the Middle East. This satellite, run by a company in United Arab Emirates, broadcasts directly over this region. Because of its direct position above the region, blocking the satellite’s signal can be difficult for the Iranian government.

Toosheh software decodes and extracts the original content from the TV video stream for users. The system also has an optional viewer library application that allows users to archive and categorize accessed content. This is also free, although Toosheh’s website containing both is blocked in Iran. However, a one-time use of a VPN or other circumvention tools (commonly used in Iran) allows users to download this software, enabling them to afterwards use Toosheh offline without any dependence on the internet.

This technology is said to be adaptable to other offline situations such as areas recovering from disaster, refugee camps, and regions with lack of Internet infrastructure.

== Content ==
Toosheh sends many kinds of digital content to its audiences through its satellite technology. In a HuffPost Q&A, Toosheh reported that the content

“contains an array of resources and entertainment that most web users take for granted, such as daily news, films and TV series, music videos, podcasts, e-books, and the most recent software for computer and mobile devices....The packages have also been delivering carefully prepared and translated resources for promoting the rights and well-being of women and LGBTQIA individuals in Iran.”

Other sources confirm this variety of distributed content.

Toosheh website advertises its partnerships with nonprofit and civil society organizations who create educational and community resources to be distributed to audiences they otherwise couldn’t reach without a way to bypass Iranian censors. These organizations and other partnering institutions as described by its website, include BBC Persia, Macholand –dedicated to reducing discrimination in Iran- and Jensiat –an illustration-based educational source for sexual and digital safety. It also lists as content partners United for Iran, Khan Academy, Manoto TV, Dojensgara, and Radio Zamaneh.

Other content transmitted includes circumvention tools, video games, DIY tutorials, and requests from Toosheh users such as music from pre-revolution Iran.

== Users ==
Within a few months of its launch, Toosheh was downloaded 56,000 times. As of January 2018, HuffPost reported it had over 150,000 users.

== Internet shutdowns and Iranian protests ==
Toosheh garnered a lot of attraction in the midst of the widespread 2017–2018 Iranian protests. Toosheh reported its usage tripled during this unrest due to fears of Internet shutdown and desires to obtain information about the demonstrations. Forbes also wrote an article highlighting the site as a main source of information for the Iranian public during such unrest, especially for content relating to women and minorities. This content focusing on sexual health, gender equality, and minority rights is normally censored by the Iranian regime.

During the protests, Toosheh’s umbrella organization, NetFreedom Pioneers, issued a Call To Action asking volunteer to collect informative sources and content to send to its audiences.

== See also ==
- Blockstream Satellite, which broadcasts Bitcoin transaction records globally.
- Datacasting which is the underlying technology used by the service.
- Othernet, another satellite data down-streaming NGO with mostly educational content, ended in 2024.
