= Balatarin =

Persian language social and political link-sharing website

- Balatarin main page
- Website type: Social and political news
- Owners: Balatarin, LLC
- Website: http://balatarin.com
- Registration: Open Registration
- Launched: August 16, 2006

Balatarin (Persian: بالاترین, lit., highest) is a Persian language social and political link-sharing website aimed primarily at Iranian audiences. Balatarin does not generate news in-house but provides a hub where users can post links to webpages of their choice, vote on their relevance or significance, and post comments. New links initially go to the "recently posted" page; as they collect positive votes, they gain a higher rank and move to the front page, which increases their visibility. Combining the technical attributes of reddit, digg, newsvine, and del.icio.us, Balatarin is a mission-oriented platform dedicated to enabling and fostering freedom of expression and information for the benefit of Iranian society.

Balatarin was named the editors' pick in 1386 (March 2007 to March 2008) in 7-Sang, a Persian Internet magazine, and was voted the second most popular Persian website in the same year. Balatarin was also voted the best "News Website" in 1385 by readers of the same magazine. Balatarin proved to be a very effective social network during and after the Iranian presidential elections in June 2009. Many Iranians used Balatarin to get the latest news about the opposition Green Movement that claimed the election was fraudulent. Meanwhile, the government methodically censored all sources of news about the unprecedented national grassroots protest movement. Balatarin was also used as a platform for coordinating protests against the regime. The effectiveness of such actions was proved during the Quds [Jerusalem] Day demonstrations on September 18, 2009. Tens of thousands of Iranians demonstrated in Tehran and subverted the government-sanctioned anti-Israeli demonstration into a rally against the Iranian regime.

In 2011, Balatarin was nominated by the jury for Deutsche Welle's The BOBs award for "Best use of technology for social good".

== New Initiatives ==
Balamusic is a virtual stage where people can watch musical performances selected by Balatarin users. The program was launched on April 5, 2011, with a live recital by the highly acclaimed Iranian soprano, Darya Dadvar. More than 3,000 Balatarin users received the program with a warm applause, with just over 1,000 from Iran and about 2,000 from the US, Canada, Germany, UK, Sweden, The Netherlands, Malaysia, and the UAE. Dadvar delighted her audience with music exclusively tuned to the occasion and took questions from her Balatarin fans after the concert. Since then, Balatarin users have posted links to an endless variety of performances, from Khorasani, Kurdish, and Armenian folk music to classical and contemporary Western music, to popular Persian orchestral music of the Golhaye-Javidan variety, to numerous vocalists, instrumentalists, and bands, old and young.

Balavision: Dialogue for Democracy is a web-based, live video streaming channel that launched in January 2013 with the mission to foster democracy and freedom of expression. In-house productions include (1) Educational Programs, (2) Interviews, (3) Debates, and (4) Internet Security.

One educational series with video animation covers the concepts, institutions, history and practices that embody democracy. Another one, centered on human rights, is presented through both educational and live interactions and moderated by the highly acclaimed human rights lawyer, Mehrangiz Kar. A series on the art of dialogue, produced by the award-winning journalist and literary critic, Faraj Sarkohi, offers guidance on how to maintain a healthy, civil, and productive dialogue; and how to establish and refine a transparent decision-making process. In an age where digital media are key to information collection, communication and organization, another series helps users learn how to ensure Internet security. The Debates series featured both experts and lay people and focused on the pros and cons of voting in the 2013 presidential elections; whether the cinematographer Mohsen Makhmalbaf should travel to Israel in July 2013 to attend the Jerusalem International Film Festival; nonviolence, and other topics of interest.

Users have the opportunity to post comments and questions and interact with the anchor and the guests during the broadcasts. The broadcasts may also be downloaded for future viewing; transcripts, audio files and English summaries of select programs are made available to make the content as accessible as possible.

In addition to in-house productions, Balavision covers conferences and events of special interest to the Iranian community live, such as reports by UN Special Rapporteur Ahmed Shaheed on the state of human rights in Iran; debates among presidential candidates in Iran streamed live from Press-TV; Global Dialogue on the Future of Iran (Munk School of Global Affairs, Univ. of Toronto, Canada); The Student Movement: Past, Present and Future, a conference hosted in Washington, DC by the newly founded Center for Democracy and Modernism, Iranian Women's Studies Foundation (IWSF) 2014 conference, San Diego, and so forth.

== History ==
=== Initial Launch ===
Balatarin was founded by Mehdi Yahyanejad on August 16, 2006. Soon after its launch a number of prominent Persian bloggers began using the website, which in turn attracted an increasing number of users. This profile turned Balatarin into the destination of choice for people in search of links and news about Iran. Aziz Ashofteh joined the Balatarin team in early October 2006, followed by other team members and volunteers who contributed to its development and maintenance over time, most of whom are known by their pseudonyms.

=== Censorship of the site in Iran ===
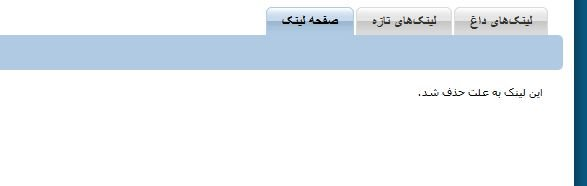
The reason removing mosadegh's user link in Balatarin

On February 1, 2007, only 6 months after Balatarin was launched, the Iranian Ministry of Information and Communication Technology blocked access to the website. In response, Balatarin asked users to call the ministry and complain. The ministry explained that the reason for blocking the website was a link to an article that contained rumors of Ali Khamenei's death.

Balatarin then created a number of new domains, including balatarin.info; but these, too, were blocked once they were discovered by the Iranian government. Currently, most Balatarin users in Iran access the site through proxy servers.

From early December 2009, the Iranian government started to illegally redirect all Balatarin visitors from Iran to a government propaganda website called "Nabavi Green Movement".

Balatarin is the subject of daily tirades by the state-run newspaper, Kayhan, which accuses the website and its management of being an instrument of foreign, anti-Islamic agencies, the same accusations that it levels at Facebook and Twitter., Before the 2013 Iranian presidential election, the cultural deputy commander of the Iranian Revolutionary Guard was quoted as saying "Four years ago, we didn't know how to combat Facebook, Twitter, Balatarin and BBC, but now we are prepared and know how to deal with them."

=== Cyber attacks on Balatarin ===
On February 3, 2009, hackers had transferred the domains and assigned them to a new DNS. A campaign was launched by several Persian language bloggers to support the return of Balatarin back online. Fars News Agency suggested that the website was hacked by Islamist hackers, since only a few links related to the Israeli invasion into Gaza had been promoted by users in Balatarin during the 3-week-long clash, and that the links posted by the pro-government users had often been disregarded.

During protests on February 14, 2011, Balatarin was brought down with a massive DDOS attack, and continued to face downtime during major protests.

A fake SSL certificate was issued for Balatarin.com through DigiNotar, a Dutch Certificate Authority, when hackers hacked into DigiNotar. There is no report on whether the rogue SSL certificate was used to intercept traffic to Balatarin from Iran.

== Social Impact ==
=== Readership statistics ===
Based on a 2010 report by Quantcast, Balatarin has about 800,000 page views a day. According to the Alexa website, 40% of Balatarin traffic comes from Iran. Based on Wakoopa, which tracks the usage of different websites through its community of members, Balatarin is the 31st most popular social network on the web in all languages.

Balatarin is written on Ruby on Rails and uses MySQL for database management.

=== Innovations ===
==== Credit system ====
Balatarin uses a non-conventional credit system that limits the daily activity of new users. Each user's credit increases over time based on their activity on Balatarin, and the quality of their contribution. The user's credit in turn determines their daily energy, the volume of allowed activity. Balatarin's goal is to prevent overly-active, new and inexperienced users from diminishing the quality of the system. A fairly complicated quadratic equation is used to calculate the daily energy.

==== Hot topics ====
Hot topics were created to allow users to organize the submitted links under a new category. Hot topics are highlighted on the front page of Balatarin. The title of a hot topic or its description may be edited by the administrators. In their individual pages, users can find all the links posted under that specific hot topic.

A new feature was added to Balatarin on December 7, 2006, after a two-week test period open to a limited number of users. Users with a credit of 15,000 or higher can add a new topic.

==== Moderators ====
Balatarin announced moderators ("Balayars," a newly coined term) on April 1, 2007, after a three-week probation period. They invited the five top-credited users to act as moderators, four of whom accepted the responsibility. The moderators' responsibilities include preventing and reacting to vandalism, cheating (e.g., possessing multiple IDs), and copyright infringement. There is an unpublished "Guidelines for Moderators" that governs moderators' operations.

A new mechanism, Abuse Reports, was added on May 13, 2007 that enables the Balatarin community to report users that abuse the system and/or links that violate Balatarin's terms of use.

=== Democracy ===
Balatarin exerts minimal administrative control over the content of the website but has assigned a number of high-credit users (four, as of June 16, 2007) as moderators with permission to remove links and/or ban users in accordance with stated guidelines.

Balatarin's moderation rules have been controversial and raised tension in some areas, for instance, when links were removed or when users were banned. This led to user complaints; some threatened to quit, alleging Balatarin violated its promise to function as a democratic website. In response, Balatarin published a post in the official blog and explained that "Balatarin is democratic to the extent that links go to the first page by your votes. A few links (under 5%) are removed in accordance with the rules established on the submission page".

== See also ==
- Community website
- Internet censorship in Iran
- Reddit
- Ruby on Rails
- Web 2.0
