= Taaghche =

Iranian e-book and audio book store

Khadamat Houshmand ide talaei hatef Taaghche خدمات هوشمند ایده طلایی هاتف طاقچه
- Website type: ebook subscription/audiobook
- Owner: نرم افزارهای هوشمند همراه هامون زرین Hamun Zarrin mobile smart software
- Website: https://taaghche.com/

Taaghche is a popular Iranian online e-book distribution platform. It was one of the most used apps before it was taken down on 31 July 2023 by Ministry of Islamic Culture and Guidance for one of its employees not wearing a hijab. University of Payam noor, the University of Tehran, the Islamic advertisement organization publishers, Beh Nashr Astan Quds Razavi publishing, and AmirKabir Publishing removed their books from the store.

On August 1, 2023, the Minister of ICT intervened and it was reopened and uncensored. Afterwards it was determinced that the blocking was not the best option.

== History ==
It is owned by Hasin, who also owns Myket, a software platform for downloading games and movies, among other content. HASIN is a firm which works with the Iranian state enterprise Mobile Communications of Iran MCI and Rightel (datak), IRIB, and Iranian banks.

== Block ==
According to Radio Farda, the website became unavailable after the Ministry of Culture and Islamic Guidance issued a notice that the website needed to obtain a license to operate. The notice came after the a photo of a woman employee without a hijab was posted on Twitter.

The Nashr Shahid Kazemi publishing house supported the platform being blocked and offered financial reimbursement to publishers who wanted to disengage from Taaghche.

The Keyhan newspaper supported the censor.

The domain ban resulted in a wide array of online criticism from internet users directed toward the government. A Damande company chief tweeted that the government is inventing Endup out of Startup.

Two days ago, there had been a similar event with Digikala.
