= User Location Service =

Standards-based computer protocol

In computing, User Location Service was a standards-based protocol for directory services and presence information, first submitted as a draft to the IETF in February 1996.

Client software supporting ULS included early versions of Microsoft Netmeeting, Intel Video Phone and FreeWebFone. Netmeeting had depreciated ULS in favour of Internet Locator Service by 1997 and FreeWebFone no longer exists.

A ULS server provides directory services and presence lookup for clients. At one stage, public ULS servers were made available by Microsoft and others, but these have largely been abandoned.

ULS typically runs on the TCP port 522.

== See also ==
- Internet Locator Service
- LDAP
