= Divar (website) =

Iranian classified advertising platform

- Company type: Private
- Website type: Digital advertising
- Available in: Persian
- Founded: 2012
- Country of origin: Iran
- Industry: Classifieds
- Employees: 501-1,000
- Parent: Agah pardazan hooshmand
- Website: divar.ir
- IPv6 support: Yes
- Commercial: Yes
- Registration: Required
- Current status: Active
- Native clients on: Android; iOS; Web app
- Written in: JavaScript, Python, Java, C++

Divar (Persian: دیوار; lit. 'wall') is an Iranian Persian classified ads and E-commerce mobile app, and an online platform for users in Iran founded in Iran in 2012 with sections devoted to real estate, vehicles, goods, community service, Industrial equipment and jobs. On average, Divar’s users post more than 139.7 million new ads & over 53.1 million users open the app annually based on the latest published annual report.

== Ads ==
To use this app, users must register, have a valid National Iranian ID number, and they must pay for posting more than 3 ads.

== Features ==
- Night Mode
- Supports screen reader
- Accessibility

== Foreign investment ==
One Dutch company has invested $47 million in the company.

== Service ==
The app sorts ads by Iranian cities, districts, and categories

- Real estate
- Vehicles
- Electronics
- Home
- Services
- Personal
- Entertainment and leisure
- Social
- Business
- Job hiring and employment

== Award ==
Iran web and mobile festival – best accessibility features

== Homa Grant ==
In 2025, Divar launched the Homa Environmental Grant initiative, directed by Iman Ebrahimi, to support environmental conservation projects in Iran. This grant program, known as Homa, provides financial assistance for small-scale projects focused on environmental protection and biodiversity conservation.

== See also ==
- Iran economy
- Sheypoor (software)
