= Neshan (software) =

- Parent: Rajman
- Written in: Java, C++, Swift, JavaScript

Neshan (Persian: نشان, lit. 'sign' or 'marker') is an Iranian mobile mapping and navigation application. It was publicly launched in Iran in 2017 by Rajman Company. In 2018, Fanap joined Rajman as an investor. According to published statistics, Neshan has been downloaded more than 10 million times from Google Play, over 35 million times from Cafe Bazaar. and more than 5 million times from the Apple App Store. The application also reports more than 4 million daily active users. During 2019-2020 pandemic it showed crowded locations.

== Features ==
Neshan is available for Android and iOS, and also offers a Progressive Web App (PWA).[6][7] The application provides turn-by-turn navigation, place and business search, real-time traffic information,[8][9] speed camera alerts, route planning that takes traffic restrictions into account, and public transportation navigation.

Additional features include:

- Real-time traffic display.
- Estimated Time of Arrival (ETA) and estimated driving time.[
- 360-degree panoramic street view.
- Persian-language voice guidance and interface.
- COVID-19 vaccination center guidance.
