= Message Exchange Bus =

Iranian cross-platform instant messaging technology

Message Exchange Bus (MXB)
- Other names: امکان اتصال متقابل
- Developer: Ministry of Information and Communications Technology of Iran
- Initial release: 2023; 3 years ago
- Operating system: Android, iOS, macOS, Windows, Linux, Web
- Platform: Cross-platform
- Type: Instant messaging, social media, mobile payment

Message Exchange Bus (MXB) (Persian: امکان اتصال متقابل) or Interconnection is an Iranian cross-platform instant messaging (IM) technology developed by the Ministry of Information and Communications Technology of Iran. It enables connection among major Iranian messaging applications, including Bale, Eitaa, Soroush, Rubika, Gap, and iGap. This integration allows users who enable the feature to communicate across different platforms without the need for multiple accounts and access more than 100 million users.

== Features ==
MXB offers a range of functionalities to enhance user experience:

- Cross-platform messaging: Users can send and receive messages across various Iranian messaging apps, ensuring communication regardless of the platform used.
- File sharing: The platform supports the exchange of files, including documents, images, and videos, between different messaging applications.
- Voice and video calls: MXB facilitates voice and video calls across connected platforms.
- Secure and unified user experience: By integrating multiple messaging services, MXB provides a secure connection.

== Development and impact ==
The development of MXB was led by the Ministry of Information and Communications Technology of Iran, aiming to establish a unified messaging ecosystem within Iran. MXB or interconnection of Iranian messaging apps, enables users of any participating app to communicate with users of other connected platforms.

In the second phase, users will be able to participate in groups, channels, and group calls, further enhancing the social and collaborative features of the network.

== See also ==
- Bale
- Eitaa
- Rubika
- iGap
- Secure instant messaging
