= Iman Ebrahimi =

Iranian bird conservationist

- ایمان ابراهیمی
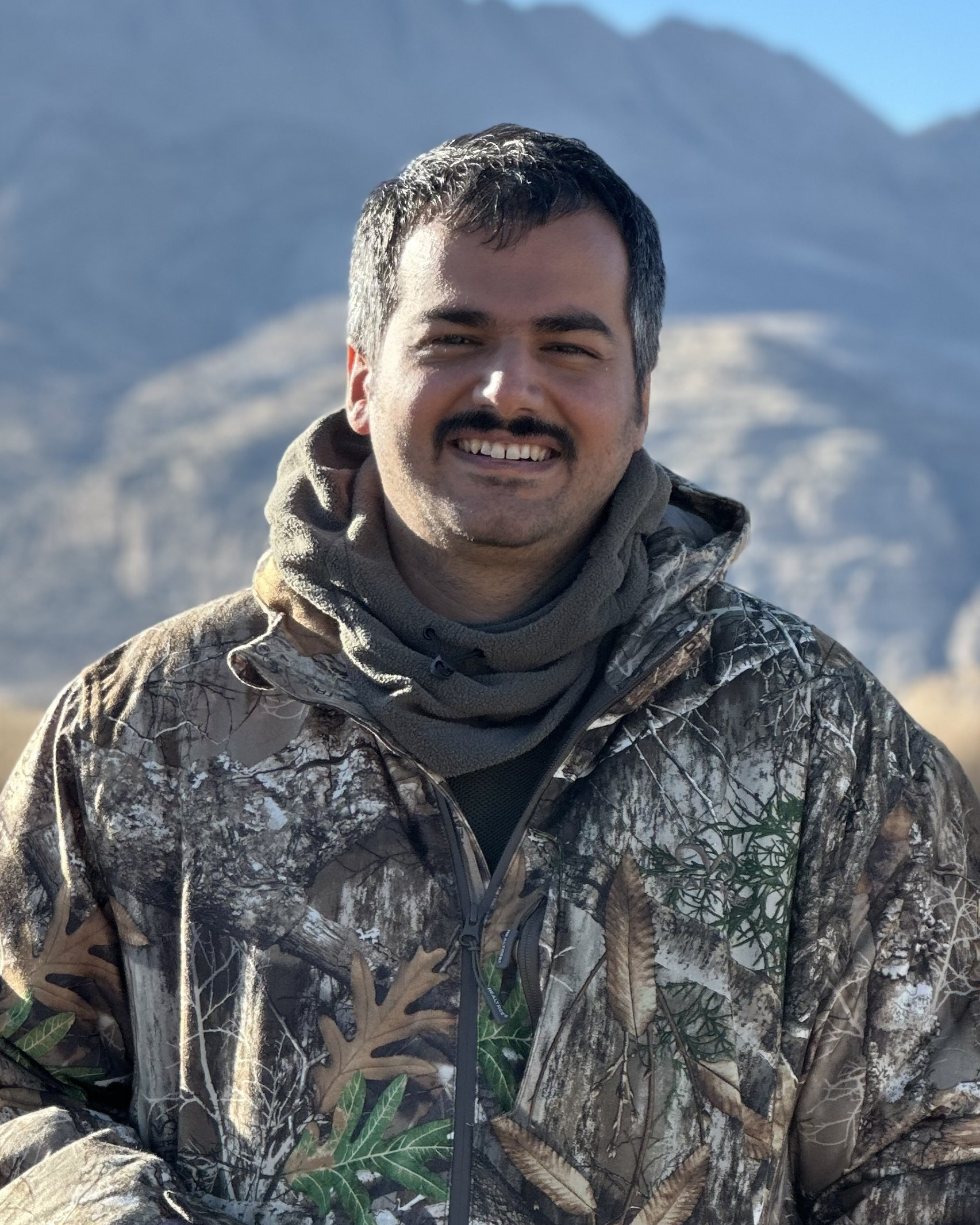
- Iman Ebrahimi, Iranian conservationist
- Born: January 1994 (age 32)
- Occupation: Conservationist
- Known for: Founder of AvayeBoom Bird Conservation Society
- Awards: Ramsar Wetland Conservation Award (2025); EE 30 Under 30 (2022); Mehregan Award for Science (2022)

Iman Ebrahimi (Persian: ایمان ابراهیمی; born January 1994) is an Iranian conservationist.

In 2025, Ebrahimi received the Ramsar Wetland Conservation Award for Young Wetland Champions for his grassroots efforts in wetland and bird conservation. He is also a recipient of the Mehregan Award for Science, and was named to the EE 30 Under 30 list by the North American Association for Environmental Education in 2022.

== Career ==
Ebrahimi is the founder of the AvayeBoom Bird Conservation Society, which focuses on bird conservation and environmental education in Iran. He is the author of "Bird Migration and Migratory Birds of Iran", a book released in collaboration with academic and government institutions. He has led projects related to wetland protection, bird monitoring, and reducing infrastructure-related threats to wildlife. His work has included selecting a flagship species for the Arjan International Wetland, and implementing measures to prevent bird collisions with power lines in protected areas.
