= Soroush Plus =

Iranian instant messenger and social media service

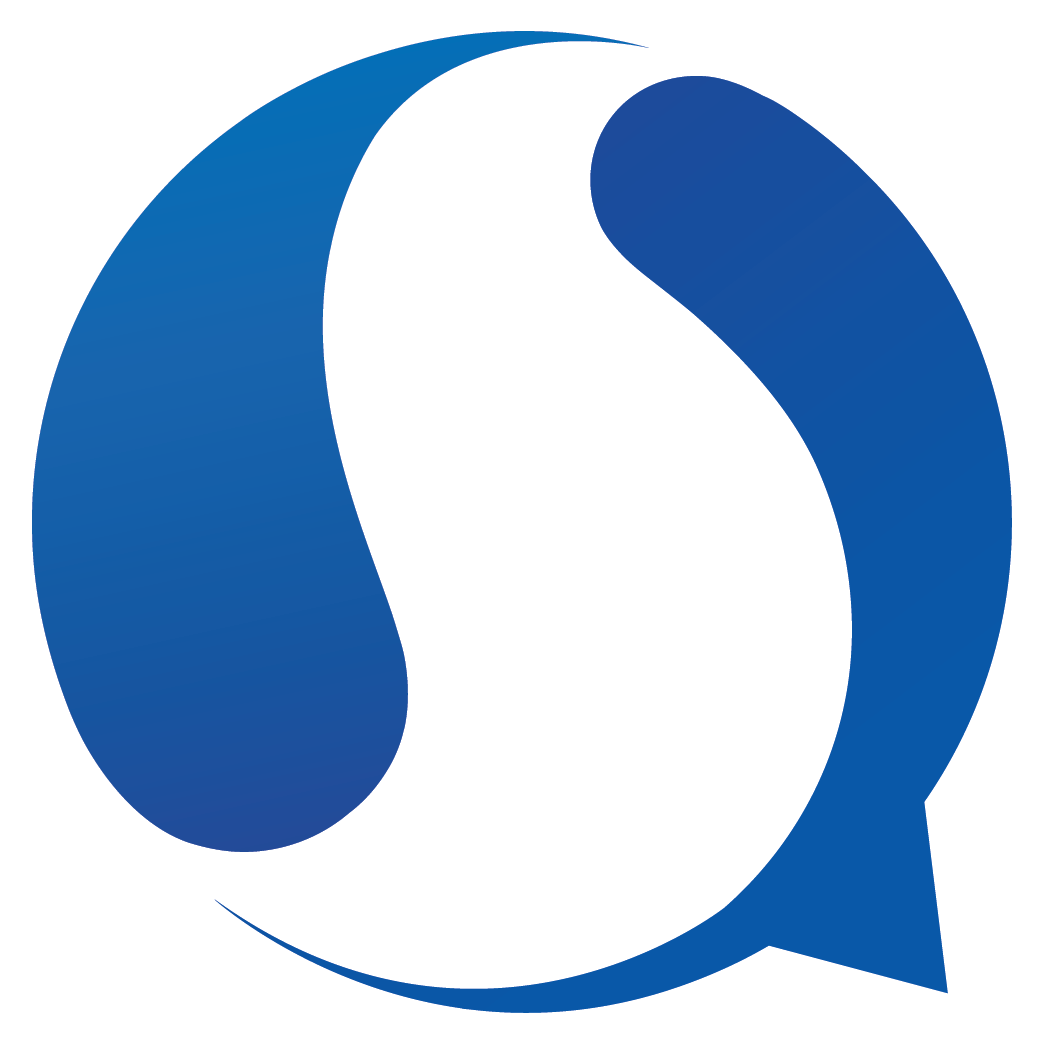
- Other names: پیام‌رسان سروش پلاس
- Developer: Setak Houshmand Sharif
- Operating system: Android; iOS; macOS; Windows; Linux; Web app
- Platform: Cross-platform
- Available in: Persian; English; Arabic
- Type: Instant messaging; social media
- License: Proprietary
- Website: splus.ir

Soroush Plus (Persian: سروش پلاس, Messenger angel) is an Iranian cross-platform, instant messaging (IM), social media and VoIP service developed by the Setak Houshmand Sharif. It is one of the most widely used messaging apps in Iran, with more than 35 million users. Soroush enables users to send text and voice messages, share images and videos, make voice and video calls, share files and locations, pay bills, and access AI and services.

Soroush is available on Android, iOS, macOS, Windows, Linux, and the web. Registration requires a mobile telephone number.

== Features ==
Soroush enables text and voice messaging, multimedia sharing, voice and video calls, and file sharing. It has unlimited cloud storage and is usable internationally. The platform also provides payment services for tasks such as paying bills, making purchases, and conducting transactions securely and has two step verification for securing accounts. Users can share their real-time location and access a variety of services through bots, including customer support and bill payments.

== Message Exchange Bus (MXB) ==
Soroush is connected to the Message Exchange Bus (MXB), which is a technology that connects major Iranian messaging platforms like Bale, Eitaa, Rubika, Gap and iGap and enables users to send messages and files, make voice and video calls and more to more than 100 million users between these apps without needing a separate account for each one, offering communication regardless of the platform used.

== Availability ==
Soroush was removed from both the Google Play Store and the Apple App Store, along with several other Iranian apps. This removal came as part of a broader action taken by these American platforms to restrict access to apps from Iran. Despite this, Soroush continues to be available through other app stores like Bazaar and Myket and to direct download, maintaining its user base.

== Privacy ==
Some sources have criticized the app for its potential use by the Iranian government to monitor citizens, with the BBC stating that the app is part of a wider initiative within the Iranian government to shift users away from apps like Telegram. In 2018, some large Iranian Telegram channels were allegedly forced by state officials to migrate to Soroush, according to Article 19, a British human rights advocacy organization. Both Soroush and the Iranian government continue to maintain that they respect user's privacy and security.

== See also ==
- Message Exchange Bus
- Bale
- Eitaa
- Rubika
- iGap
