= Rubika =

Iranian social media, instant messenger and video on-demand service

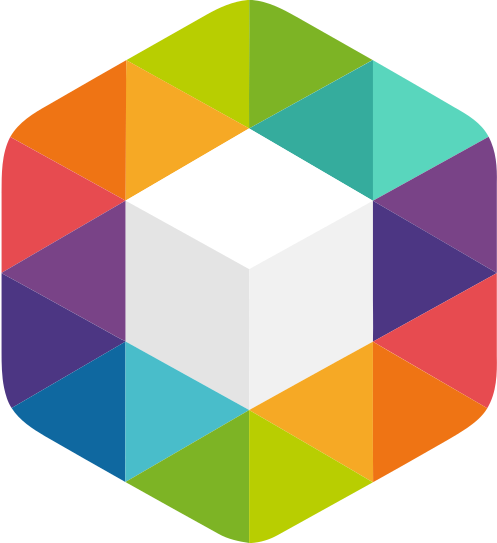
- Other names: پیام‌رسان روبیکا
- Developer: Tusca
- Operating system: Android; iOS; Web app
- Platform: Cross-platform
- Size: 78 MB (Android)
- Available in: 9 languages
- List of languages: Persian; English; Arabic; German; Spanish; Italian; Dutch; Portuguese (Brazil); Korean
- Type: Social media; Instant messaging; VOD
- License: Proprietary
- Website: rubika.ir

Rubika (Persian: روبیکا) is an Iranian cloud-based, cross-platform, social media, instant messaging (IM), VoIP and VOD service developed by Tusca holding, MCI and MTN Irancell. It is the most popular social media app in Iran, with more than 70 million users and the largest social media app based in West Asia. It is available on Android, iOS and the web. Registration requires a mobile telephone number.

== History ==
Rubika was launched as part of efforts to provide a communication and social media platform developed by Iran. Over time, it has grown to be a widely recognized platform with a large user base with the support of major organizations like MCI and MTN Irancell. Rubika's success is reflected in its prominence as the most used social media app in Iran, with an increasing focus on expanding to international markets. It is surveilled in part through MCI Digital platform monitoring center.

== Features ==
The platform includes AI-driven tools and video calling with end-to-end encryption and has two step verification for securing accounts. For businesses, Rubika offers tools for advertising and customer engagement, including business pages and shopping channels. The platform is usable internationally and has unlimited cloud storage. Rubika includes free entertainment options such as live broadcasts, TV, and video streaming, alongside a photo-sharing feature. Additionally, Rubika integrates financial services, including a built-in payment system, digital wallet and access to health insurance. Internet costs is free while Messaging if MCI or Irancell sim is in use. Features also include virtual classrooms for students, free VOD with no need for a subscription (if MCI or Irancell sim is in use), dark mode and location services and more.

=== Social networking services ===
Rubika integrates traditional social media functions with messaging features, offering an all-in-one solution for users. Businesses leverage the platform for direct engagement, advertising, and e-commerce, while individuals enjoy community interactions, photo sharing, and livestreams.

=== Video on demand ===
The platform includes a robust free video on demand feature with no need for a subscription if MCI or Irancell sim is in use, providing access to movies, series, and live TV channels. Users can enjoy personalized recommendations based on viewing habits.

== Message Exchange Bus (MXB) ==
Rubika will be a part of the Message Exchange Bus (MXB), which is a technology that connects major Iranian messaging platforms, including Bale, Eitaa, Rubika, Gap, iGap and Soroush. MXB enables users to send end-to-end encrypted messages and files, make voice and video calls and more to over 200 million users between these apps without needing a separate account for each one. This system has been made in Iran for the first time and is instrumental in creating a unified messaging ecosystem in Iran.

== Availability ==
All of Rubika's features are available internationally, including messaging, voice and video calls, file transfers, Social Networking Services, bots and AI.

In 2022, Rubika was removed from both the Google Play Store and the Apple App Store, along with several other Iranian apps. This removal came as part of a broader action taken by these American platforms to restrict access to apps from Iran. Despite this, Rubika continues to be available on Android through direct downloads and other app stores like Bazaar and Myket and on iOS through its web app, maintaining its user base.

== See also ==
- Message Exchange Bus
- Secure instant messaging
- Bale
- Eitaa
- iGap
- Sourosh plus
- Filimo
