= Sheypoor =

Classified ads platform

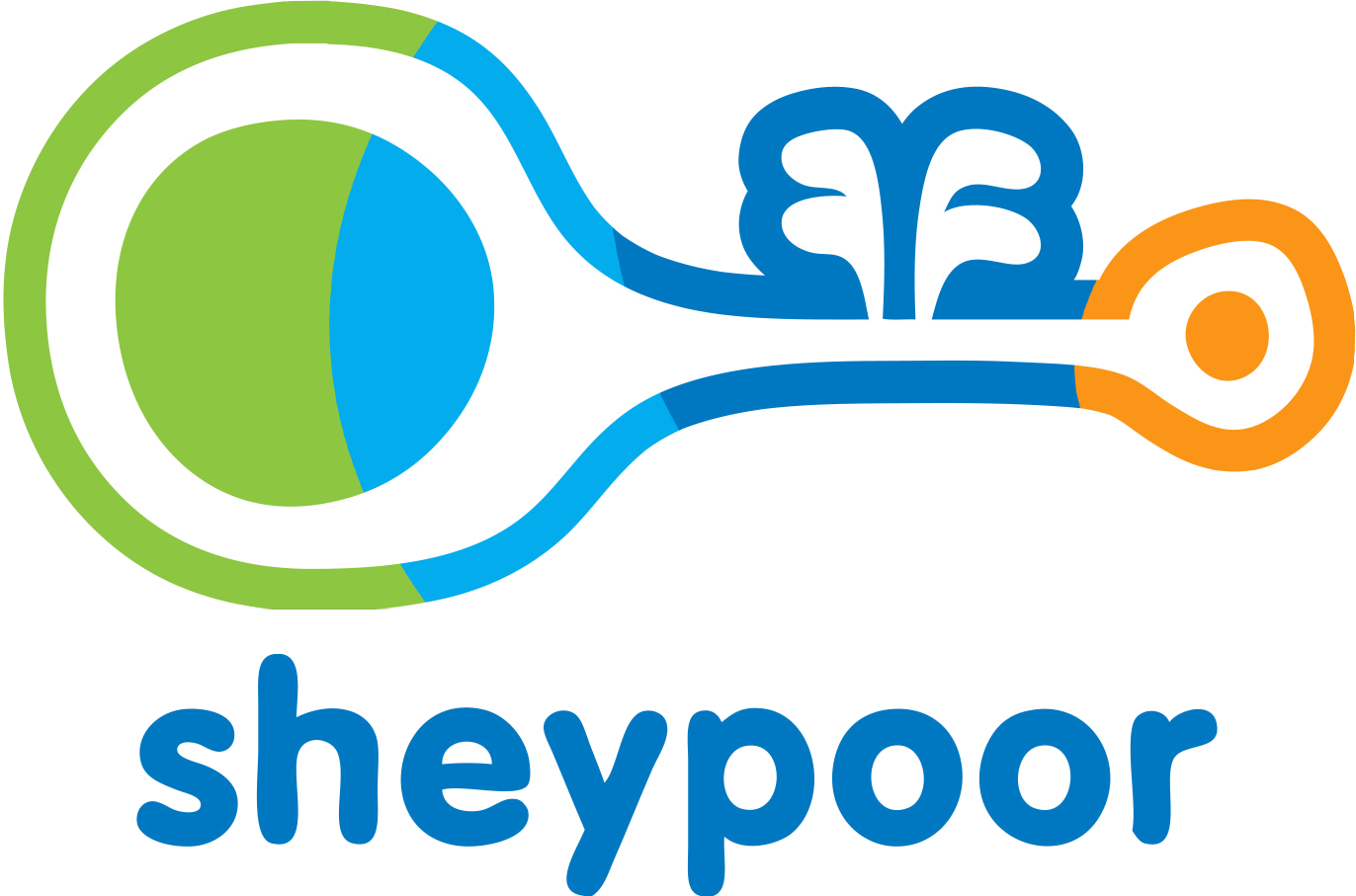

- View of the official website in 2024
- Founded: 2013; 13 years ago
- Headquarters: Tehran, Iran
- Key people: Reza Arbabian (Founder)
- Services: Classified advertising, Second-hand shop
- Website: www.sheypoor.com

Sheypoor (Persian: شیپور; lit. "bugle") is a classified ads platform website and mobile application, headquartered in Tehran, Iran. Thousands of advertisements are added to the app every day.

== See also ==
- Divar (website)
