= IGap =

Iranian open source instant messenger and social media service

iGap
- Developer: Kian Iranian STD
- Release: October 2015; 11 years ago
- Operating system: Android; iOS; macOS; Windows; Linux; Web app
- Platform: Cross-platform
- Available in: Persian; English
- Type: Instant messaging; Social media
- License: Clients: GNU Affero General Public License; Server: Proprietary
- Website: www.igap.net
- Repository: github.com/KianIranian-STDG/iGap-Android

iGap (Persian: آیگپ) is an Iranian open source, cloud-based, cross-platform, instant messaging (IM), social media and VoIP service developed by the Kian Iranian STD. It is the first end-to-end encrypted, open source and AES encrypted messaging app in West Asia and one of the most popular messaging apps in Iran and West Asia, with more than 20 million users. iGap enables users to send text and voice messages, share images and videos, make voice and video calls, share files and locations, pay bills, and access AI, services and more.

iGap is available on Android, iOS, macOS, Windows, Linux, and the web. Registration requires a mobile telephone number. iGap supports P2P-based voice calls over the internet.

== Features ==
iGap enables text and voice messaging, multimedia sharing, voice and video calls, and file sharing. It has unlimited cloud storage and is usable internationally. The platform also provides payment services for tasks such as paying bills, making purchases, and conducting transactions securely and has two step verification for securing accounts. Users can share their real-time location and access a variety of services through bots, including customer support and bill payments.

=== Open-source clients, end-to-end encryption & AES encryption ===
iGap is end-to-end encrypted, AES encrypted and has published the source code of its Android and iOS client on GitHub. These features make iGap one of the most secure and private messengers.

== Message Exchange Bus (MXB) ==
iGap is connected to the Message Exchange Bus (MXB), which is a technology that connects major Iranian messaging platforms including Bale, Eitaa, Rubika, Gap, iGap and Soroush. MXB enables users to send end-to-end encrypted messages and files, make voice and video calls and more to over 200 million users between these apps without needing a separate account for each one, offering communication regardless of the platform used. This system is instrumental in creating a unified messaging ecosystem in Iran and is created for the first time in Iran.

== See also ==
- Message Exchange Bus
- Secure instant messaging
- Bale
- Eitaa
- Rubika
- Sourosh plus
